= Ken Vandermark discography =

Discography for jazz reedist Ken Vandermark. The year indicates when the album was first released.

== Ken Vandermark ==
- Caffeine (Jim Baker/Steve Hunt/Ken Vandermark):Caffeine (Okka Disk, 1994)
- Standards (Quinnah, 1995)
- Steelwool Trio (Ken Vandermark/Kent Kessler/Curt Newton): International Front (Okka Disk, 1995)
- Barrage Double Trio: Utility Hitter (Quinnah, 1996)
- Cinghiale: Hoofbeats of the Snorting Swine (Eighth Day Music, 1996)
- FJF (Mats Gustafsson/Ken Vandermark/Steve Hunt/Kent Kessler): Blow Horn (Okka Disk, 1997)
- Steam: Real Time (Eighth Day Music, 1997)
- Joe Harriott Project: Straight Lines (Atavistic, 1999)
- Two Days in December (Wobbly Rail, 2002)
- Furniture Music (Okka Disk, 2003)
- Paul Lytton/Ken Vandermark/Philipp Wachsmann: CINC (Okka Disk, 2006)
- Bridge 61: Journal (Atavistic, 2006)
- Ken Vandermark, Kent Kessler, Nate McBride, Ingebrigt Håker Flaten & Wilbert De Joode: Collected Fiction (Okka Disk, 2009)
- The Frame Quartet (Tim Daisy/Fred Lonberg-Holm/Nate McBride/Ken Vandermark): 35 mm (Okka Disk, 2009)
- iTi (Johannes Bauer/Ken Vandermark/Paal Nilssen-Love/Thomas Lehn): Artifact: Live In St. Johann (Okka Disk, 2010)
- Predella Group: Strade D'Acqua (Multikulti, 2010)
- Mark in the Water (Not Two, 2011)
- Platform 1: Takes Off (Clean Feed, 2012)
- Ken Vandermark's Topology Nonet featuring Joe McPhee: Impressions of Po Music (Okka Disk, 2013)
- Nine Ways to Read a Bridge (Not Two, 2014)
- Site Specific (Audiographic Records, 2015)
- Momentum 1: Stone (Audiographic Records, 2016)
- Escalator (Not Two, 2017)
- Momentum 4: Consequent Duos 2015>2019 (Audiographic Records/Catalytic Sounds, 2019)

== The Vandermark Quartet ==
- Big Head Eddie (Platypus, 1993)
- Solid Action (Platypus, 1994)

== The Vandermark 5 ==
- Single Piece Flow (Atavistic, 1997)
- Target or Flag (Atavistic, 1998)
- Simpatico (Atavistic, 1999)
- Burn the Incline (Atavistic, 2000)
- Acoustic Machine (Atavistic, 2001)
- Free Jazz Classics Vol. 1 & 2 (Atavistic, 2002)
- Airports for Light (Atavistic, 2003)
- Elements of Style/Exercises in Surprise (Atavistic, 2004)
- Alchemia (Not Two, 2005)
- The Color of Memory (Atavistic, 2005)
- Free Jazz Classics Vol. 3 & 4 (Atavistic, 2005)
- A Discontinuous Line (Atavistic, 2006)
- Four Sides to the Story (Not Two, 2006)
- Beat Reader (Atavistic, 2008)
- Annular Gift (Not Two, 2009)
- The Horse Jumps and the Ship Is Gone (Not Two, 2010)

== The Crown Royals ==
- All Night Burner (Estrus, 1997)
- Funky-Do! (Estrus, 1999)

== DKV Trio ==
(Hamid Drake/Kent Kessler/Ken Vandermark)

- Fred Anderson / DKV Trio (Okka Disk, 1997)
- Baraka (Okka Disk, 1997)
- DKV Live (limited edition - Okka Disk, 1997)
- Deep Telling (Okka Disk, 1999) - with Joe Morris
- Live in Wels & Chicago, 1998 (Okka Disk, 1999)
- Trigonometry (Okka Disk, 2002)
- AALY Trio/DKV Trio: Double or Nothing (Okka Disk, 2002)
- Past Present (Not Two, 2012)
- Schl8hof (Trost, 2013) - with Mats Gustafsson, Massimo Pupillo, Paal Nilssen-Love
- Sound in Motion in Sound (Not Two, 2014)
- Collider (Not Two, 2016)

== AALY Trio + Ken Vandermark ==
(Mats Gustafsson/Peter Janson/Kjell Nordeson + Ken Vandermark)

- Hidden in the Stomach (Silkheart, 1998)
- Stumble (Wobbly Rail, 1998)
- Live at the Glenn Miller Café (Wobbly Rail, 1999)
- I Wonder If I Was Screaming (Crazy Wisdom, 2000)

== Sound in Action Trio ==
- Design in Time (Delmark, 1999)
- Gate (Atavistic, 2006)

== Tripleplay ==
- Expansion Slang (Boxholder, 2000)
- Gambit (Clean Feed, 2004)

== Spaceways Inc. ==
(Hamid Drake, Ken Vandermark)

- Thirteen Cosmic Standards (Atavistic, 2000)
- Version Soul (Atavistic, 2002)
- Radiale (Atavistic, 2004) - with Zu

== School Days ==
(Vandermark/Bishop/Nordeson/Håker-Flaten/Nilssen-Love)

- Crossing Division (Okka Disk, 2000)
- In Our Times (Okka Disk, 2002)
- Nuclear Assembly Hall (Okka Disk, 2004) - with Atomic
- Distil (Okka Disk, 2008) - with Atomic

== Territory Band ==
- Transatlantic Bridge (Okka Disk, 2001)
- Atlas (Okka Disk, 2002)
- Map Theory (Okka Disk, 2004)
- Company Switch (Okka Disk, 2005)
- A New Horse for the White House (Okka Disk, 2006)
- Collide (Okka Disk, 2007) - with Fred Anderson

== FME ==
(Paal Nilssen-Love/Nate McBride/Ken Vandermark)

- Live at the Glenn Miller Cafe (Okka Disk, 2002)
- Underground (Okka Disk, 2004)
- Cuts (Okka Disk, 2005)
- Montage (Okka Disk, 2006)

== Paal Nilssen-Love & Ken Vandermark ==
- Dual Pleasure (Smalltown Supersound, 2002)
- Dual Pleasure 2 (Smalltown Supersound, 2004)
- Seven (Smalltown Supersound, 2006)
- Chicago Volume (Smalltown Supersound, 2010)
- Milwaukee Volume (Smalltown Supersound, 2010)
- Letter to a Stranger (Smalltown Supersound, 2011)
- Lightning Over Water (Laurence Family, 2014)
- Extended Duos (Audiographic/PNL, 2014)

== Free Fall ==
- Furnace (Wobbly Rail, 2003)
- Amsterdam Funk (Smalltown Supersonic, 2005)
- The Point in a Line (Smalltown Supersonic, 2007)
- Gray Scale (Smalltown Supersonic, 2010)

== Sonore ==
(Peter Brötzmann/Mats Gustafsson/Ken Vandermark)

- No One Ever Works Alone (Okka Disk, 2004)
- Only the Devil Has No Dreams (Jazzwerkstatt, 2007)
- Call Before You Dig (Okka Disk, 2009)
- Cafe OTO / London (Trost, 2011)

== Powerhouse Sound ==
- Oslo/Chicago: Breaks (Atavistic, 2007)
- Overlap (Laurence Family, 2010)

== Daisy / Vandermark Duo ==
(Tim Daisy/Ken Vandermark)

- August Music (Self-released, 2007)
- Light on the Wall (Laurence Family, 2009)
- The Conversation (Multikulti, 2011)

== Fire Room ==
- Broken Music (Atavistic, 2008)
- Second Breath (Bocian, 2013)

== The Resonance Ensemble ==
- Resonance (Not Two, 2008)
- Resonance (Box set) (Not Two, 2009)
- Kafka in Flight (Not Two, 2011)
- What Country Is This? (Not Two, 2012)
- Head Above Water, Feet Out the Fire (Not Two, 2013)
- Double Arc (Not Two, 2015)

== Lean Left ==
(Paal Nilssen-Love/Terrie Ex/Andy Moor/Ken Vandermark)

- Volume 1 (Smalltown Supersound, 2009/Catalytic Sound, 2010)
- Volume 2 (Smalltown Supersound, 2010)
- Live at Cafe Oto (Unsounds, 2012)
- Live at Cafe Oto Day One with Ab Baars (Catalytic Sound, 2012)
- Live at Cafe Oto Day Two with Steve Noble (Catalytic Sound, 2012)
- Live at Area Sismica (Unsounds, 2014)

== Side A ==
- A New Margin (Clean Feed, 2011)
- In the Abstract (Not Two, 2014)

== Double Tandem ==
- Cement (PNL, 2012)
- Ox (dEN, 2012)

== Made To Break ==
- Provoke (Clean Feed, 2013)
- Lacerba (Clean Feed, 2013)
- Cherchez La Femme (Trost, 2014)
- Before the Code (Trost, 2015)
- Before the Code: Live (Audiographic, 2016)
- N N N (Audiographic, 2016)
- Dispatch to the Sea (Audiographic, 2016)
- Trebuchet (Trost, 2017)

== The Margots ==
- Pescado (Okka Disk, 2013)
- Sople (Okka Disk, 2014)

== Audio One ==
(Jason Adasciewicz/Josh Berman/Jeb Bishop/Tim Daisy/Nick Macri/Nick Mazzarella/Jen Paulson/Dave Rempis/Ken Vandermark/Mars Williams)

- An International Report (Audiographic, 2014)
- The Midwest School (Audiographic, 2014)
- What Thomas Bernhard Saw (Audiographic, 2015)

== DEK Trio ==
(Elisabeth Harnik/Didi Kern/Ken Vandermark)

- Burning Below Zero (Trost Records, 2016)
- Construct 1 - Stone (Audiographic, 2017)
- Construct 2 - Artfacts (Audiographic, 2017)
- Divadlo 29 (Audiographic, 2017)

== Marker ==
(Ken Vandermark/Macie Stewart/Steve Marquette/Andrew Clinkman/Phil Sudderberg)

- Wired for Sound (Audiographic, 2018)
- Roadwork 1 / Roadwork 2 / Homework 1 3-CD set (Audiographic, 2018)

== Edition Redux ==
(Erez Dessel/Lily Finnegan/Beth McDonald/Ken Vandermark)

- Better a Rook Than a Pawn (Audiographic, 2023)
- Broadcast Transformer (Audiographic, 2025)

== Other collaborations ==
- Joe McPhee/Ken Vandermark/Kent Kessler: A Meeting in Chicago (Eighth Day Music, 1997; Okka Disk reissue)
- Joe Morris/Ken Vandermark/Hans Poppel: Like Rays (Knitting Factory, 1998)
- Paul Lytton/Ken Vandermark: English Suites (Wobbly Rail, 2000)
- Pipeline (Corbett vs. Dempsey, 2000, issued 2013)
- Pandelis Karayorgis/Nate McBride/Ken Vandermark: No Such Thing (Boxholder, 2001)
- Ken Vandermark & Brian Dibblee: Duets (Future Reference, 2003)
- Gold Sparkle Trio + Ken Vandermark: Brooklyn Cantos (Squealer, 2004)
- Rutherford/Vandermark/Müller/van der Schyff: Hoxha (Spool, 2005)
- Marcin Oleś/Bartłomiej Brat Oleś/Ken Vandermark: 'Ideas (Not Two, 2005)
- Morris/Vandermark/Gray: Rebus (Clean Feed, 2007)
- Vandermark/Karayorgis: Foreground Music (Okka Disk, 2007)
- Broo/Lane/Nilssen-Love/Vandermark: 4 Corners (Clean Feed, 2007)
- The Thing + Ken Vandermark: Immediate Sound (Smalltown Supersound, 2007)
- Ab Baars Trio + Ken Vandermark: Goofy June Bug (Wig, 2008)
- C.O.D.E.: Play the Music of Ornette Coleman & Eric Dolphy (Cracked An Egg, 2008)
- Vandermark/Guy/Sanders: Fox Fire (Maya, 2009)
- Reed Trio: Last Train to the First Station (Kilogram, 2011)
- Full Blast and Friends: Sketches and Ballads (Trost, 2011)
- Paul Lytton/Nate Wooley + Ikue Mori/Ken Vandermark: The Nows (Clean Feed, 2012)
- Vandermark/Gustafsson: Verses (Corbett vs. Dempsey, 2013)
- Rara Avis: Mutations / Multicellular Mutations (dEN, 2013)
- The Ex & Brass Unbound: Enormous Door (Ex Records, 2013)
- Vandermark/Grubbs: Parallax Sounds (Just Temptation, 2014)
- Ken Vandermak & Nate Wooley Duo: East by Northwest (Audiographic/Pleasure of the Text, 2014)
- Ken Vandermak & Nate Wooley Duo: All Directions Home (Audiographic/Pleasure of the Text, 2015)
- Rara Avis: Rara Avis (Not Two, 2015)
- Barry Guy/Ken Vandermark: Occasional Poems (Not Two, 2015)
- Mars Williams/Dave Rempis/Ken Vandermark/[Nick Mazzarella: Western Automatic (Aerophonic Records, 2015)
- Lasse Marhaug/Ken Vandermark: Close Up (Audiographic Records, 2016)
- Terrie Hessels/Ken Vandermark: Splinters (Audiographic Records, 2016)
- Shelter (Steve Heather/Jasper Stadhouders/Ken Vandermark/Nate Wooley): Shelter (Audiographic Records, 2017)
- Tim Daisy/Michael Thieke/Ken Vandermark: Triptych (Catalytic Sound, 2017)
- Rutherford/Vandermark/Müller/van der Schyff: Are We in Diego? (WhirrbooM!, 2018)
- VWCR: Ken Vandermark/Nate Wooley/Sylvie Courvoisier/Tom Rainey: Noise Of Our Time (Intakt Records, 2018)
- Ken Vandermark/Michael Snow :Vandermark & Snow: DUOL (Corbett vs. Dempsey, 2019)

== As sideman ==
With Jeb Bishop

- 98 Duets (Wobbly Rail, 1998)

With Boxhead Ensemble

- Dutch Harbor – Where the Sea Breaks Its Back (Atavistic, 1997)
- The Last Place to Go (Atavistic, 1998)

With Peter Brötzmann - The Chicago Octet/Tentet/Tentet Plus Two

- The Chicago Octet/Tentet (Okka Disk, 1998)
- Stone/Water (Okka Disk, 2000)
- Two Lightboxes (2000)
- Broken English (Okka Disk, 2002)
- Short Visit to Nowhere (Okka Disk, 2002)
- Images (Okka Disk, 2004)
- Signs (Okka Disk, 2004)
- Be Music, Night (Okka Disk, 2005)
- American Landscapes 1 (Okka Disk, 2007)
- American Landscapes 2 (Okka Disk, 2007)
- At Molde 2007 (Okka Disk, 2008)
- 3 Nights in Oslo (Smalltown Supersound, 2010)
- Walk, Love, Sleep (Smalltown Supersound, 2012)

With The Denison/Kimball Trio

- Neutrons (Quarterstick, 1997)

With The Flying Luttenbachers

- Constructive Destruction (ugEXPLODE, 1994)
- Destroy All Music (ugEXPLODE, 1994)

With Alan Licht & Loren Mazzacane Connors

- Hoffman Estates (Drag City, 1998)

With Misha Mengelberg

- Two Days in Chicago (hatOLOGY, 1999)

With the NRG Ensemble

- Calling All Mothers (Quinnah, 1994)
- This Is My House (Delmark, 1996)
- Bejazzo Gets a Facelift (Atavistic, 1998)

With Eric Revis

- Parallax (Clean Feed, 2013)

With Luke Stewart Exposure Quintet

- Luke Stewart Exposure Quintet (Astral Spirits, 2020)

With Witches & Devils

- At the Empty Bottle (Knitting Factory, 2000)

== Guest appearances ==
- Syl Johnson: Back in the Game (Delmark, 1994)
- Gastr del Sol: Camoufleur (1998)
- Pinetop Seven: Rigging the Toplights (1998)
- Superchunk: Come Pick Me Up (1999)
- Portastatic feat. Ken Vandermark/Tim Mulvenna: The Perfect Little Door (Merge, 2001)
- Zu: Igneo (2002)

== See also ==
- List of experimental big bands
