= Jeb Bishop discography =

Artist discography

Jeb Bishop is primarily known as an improvisational jazz trombonist. However he occasionally plays other instruments on both jazz and rock recordings as noted.

== As leader/co-leader ==
- 98 Duets (Wobbly Rail, 1998)
- Jeb Bishop Trio (Okka Disk, 1999)
- Afternoons (Okka Disk, 2001) Trio/Quartet
- Chicago Defenders (Wobbly Rail, 2002) Duo with Sebi Tramontana
- Farragut (Lakefront Digital, 2006), Lucky 7s
- Pluto Junkyard (Clean Feed Records, 2009)
- 2009 (Better Animal Recs, 2009), Jeb Bishop Trio
- Wire And Brass (Okka Disk, 2010) The Engines
- 1000 Words (Driff Records, 2012) & Jorrit Dijkstra
- Old Shoulders (Relay Recordings, 2012) duo with Tim Daisy
- Other Violets (Not Two Records, 2013) The Engines with John Tchicai:
- Green Knights (Aerophonic Records, 2015) The Engines
- Staffa (Breakfast for Dinner Records, 2015) with Long Sidewalks
- Scratch Slice Jag (Out & Gone Music, 2017) duo with Dan Ruccia
- Konzert für Hannes (Not Two Records, 2017) with Matthias Muche & Matthias Müller, trombones
- From A to B (Jazzwerkstatt, 2022) with Matthias Muche & Matthias Müller, trombones
- Three Valentines and Goodbye (1980 Records, 2018) solo
- Re-Collect (Not Two Records, 2019) with Flex Quartet
- Duo (Creative Sources, 2019) with Matthias Muche
- Flayed (ugEXPLODE, 2019) trio with Weasel Walter and Alex Ward
- Pioneer Works vol. 1 (Balance Point Acoustics, 2019) (with Weasel Walter / Damon Smith / Jaap Blonk)
- Pioneer Works vol. 2 [cassette] (Balance Point Acoustics, 2019) & JeJaWeDa (with Weasel Walter / Damon Smith / Jaap Blonk)
- Universal or Directional (Balance Point Acoustics, 2020) with Dan Clucas, Damon Smith, Matt Crane)
- Centrifugal Trio (Astral Spirits, 2020) with Centrifugal Trio
- Duals (Driff/Balance Point Acoustics, 2022) Duos with Damon Smith and with Pandelis Karayorgis
- Tells or Terrier (Not Two Records, 2023) Trio with Joe Morris and Nathan McBride

== Collaborations ==
- Joe McPhee / Jeb Bishop: The Brass City (Okka Disk, 1999)
- Tony Bevan, Jeb Bishop, Michael Zerang, John Edwards: Nham (Foghorn Records, 2002)
- The Engines: The Engines (Okka Disk, 2007)
- Jeb Bishop / Harris Eisenstadt / Jason Roebke: Tiebreaker (Not Two Records, 2008)
- Joe McPhee, Jeb Bishop, Ingebrigt Håker Flaten, Michael Zerang: Ibsen’s Ghosts (Not Two Records, 2011)
- Jeb Bishop, Jaap Blonk, Lou Mallozzi & Frank Rosaly: At The Hideout (Kontrans, 2012)
- Rodrigo Amado Motion Trio & Jeb Bishop: Burning Live At Jazz Ao Centro (JACC Records, 2012)
- Cactus Truck With Jeb Bishop and Roy Campbell: Live In USA (Tractata Records, 2013) (trombone, electronics/fx)
- Rodrigo Amado Motion Trio + Jeb Bishop: The Flame Alphabet (Not Two Records, 2013)
- Polyorchard: Color Theory in Black and White (Polyorchard, 2015)
- Polyorchard: Red October (Out & Gone Music, 2017)
- Polyorchard: Sextet / Quintet (Out & Gone Music, 2018)
- Polyorchard (Jeb Bishop and David Menestres): Ink (Out & Gone Music, 2020)
- The Diagonal: Filter (Not Two Records, 2018)
- Cutout: Cutout (Driff Records, 2020)
- Vinny Golia, Jeb Bishop, Sany Ewen, Damon Smith, Ron Coulter. STL23 (Kreating SounD, 2025)

== As sideman ==
With Atomic / School Days
- Nuclear Assembly Hall (Okka Disk, 2004)
- Distil (Okka Disk, 2008)

With Bathysphere

- Bathysphere (Driff Records, 2015)

With Bonaventure Pencroff

- De Fortune (Mz Records, 2014)

With Peter Brötzmann

- Peter Brötzmann, The Chicago Octet/Tentet (Okka Disk, 1998)
- Peter Brötzmann Chicago Tentet, Stone/Water (Okka Disk, 2000)
- Peter Brötzmann Chicago Tentet Plus Two, Short Visit To Nowhere (Okka Disk, 2002)
- Peter Brötzmann Chicago Tentet Plus Two, Broken English (Okka Disk, 2002)
- Peter Brötzmann Chicago Tentet, Images (Okka Disk, 2004)
- Peter Brötzmann Chicago Tentet, Signs (Okka Disk, 2004)
- Peter Brötzmann Chicago Tentet Featuring Mike Pearson, Be Music, Night (Okka Disk, 2005)
- Peter Brötzmann Chicago Tentet + 1, 3 Nights in Oslo (Smalltown Superjazzz, 2010)
- Peter Brötzmann Chicago Tentet, Walk, Love, Sleep (Smalltown Superjazzz, 2012)
- Peter Brötzmann, Long Story Short (Trost Records, 2013)
- Peter Brötzmann Chicago Tentet, Concert For Fukushima Wels 2011 (PanRec/Trost Records, 2013)

With Kyle Bruckmann

- And (Musica Genera, 2001)
- Wrack (Red Toucan Records, 2003)
- Kyle Bruckmann's Wrack, ...Awaits Silent Tristero's Empire (Singlespeed Music, 2014)

With John Butcher

- Anomalies In The Customs Of The Day: Music On Seven Occasions (Meniscus, 2000)

With Chicago Edge Ensemble

- Decaying Orbit (Lizard Breath, 2017)
- Insidious Anthem (Trost, 2018)
- The Individualists (Lizard Breath, 2023)

With Daniele D'Agaro, Jeb Bishop, Kent Kessler, Robert Barry

- Chicago Overtones (hatOLOGY, 2005)

With Darren Johnston's Gone To Chicago

- The Big Lift (Porto Franco Records, 2011)

With Bill Dixon

- Bill Dixon with Exploding Star Orchestra (Thrill Jockey, 2008)

With Harris Eisenstadt

- The Soul And Gone (482 Music, 2005)
- Old Growth Forest (Clean Feed Records, 2016)
- Recent Developments (Songlines, 2017)
- Old Growth Forest II (Astral Sprits, 2019)

With Exploding Star Orchestra

- We Are All From Somewhere Else (Thrill Jockey, 2007)
- Stars Have Shapes (Delmark Records, 2010)
- Matter Anti-Matter (RogueArt, 2014)

With The Flatlands Collective

- Gnomade (Skycap Records, 2007)
- Maatjes (Clean Feed Records, 2009)

With The Flying Luttenbachers

- Constructive Destruction (ugEXPLODE Records, 1994) (bass guitar, trombone)
- Destroy All Music (ugEXPLODE Records, 1995) (bass guitar, Casio keyboard)
- Destroy All Music Revisited (Skin Graft Records, 2007) (bass guitar, Casio keyboard)

With Frank Rosaly

- ¡Todos de Pie! (Kontrans, 2019)

With Globe Unity Orchestra

- Globe Unity - 40 Years (Intakt Records, 2008)

With Hamid Drake & Bindu

- Reggaeology (RogueArt, 2010)

With Eric Hofbauer's Five Agents

- Book of Water (Creative Nation Music, 2019)

With Jason Roebke Octet

- High/Red/Center (Delmark Records, 2014)

With Joe Harriott Project

- Straight Lines (Atavistic Records, 1999)

With John Corbett & Heavy Friends

- I'm Sick About My Hat (Atavistic Records, 1999)

With Jorrit Dijkstra's Pillow Circles

- Pillow Circles (Clean Feed Records, 2010)
- Pillow Circles Live Bimhuis Amsterdam (Driff Records, 2014)

With Josh Berman & His Gang

- There Now (Delmark Records, 2012)

With Keefe Jackson Quartet

- Seeing You See (Clean Feed, 2010)

With Ken Vandermark's TOPOLOGY Nonet featuring Joe McPhee

- Impressions Of Po Music (Okka Disk, 2013)

With KLANG

- Other Doors (Allos Documents, 2011)

With The Lightbox Orchestra

- Two Lightboxes (Locust Music, 2004)

With Fred Lonberg-Holm

- Site-Specific: Duets For Cello And Guitar (Explain:, 2000)

With Mike Reed's People, Places & Things

- About Us (482 Music, 2009)
- Stories And Negotiations (482 Music, 2010)

With Paul Giallorenzo's GitGo

- Emergent (Leo Records, 2012)
- Force Majeure (Delmark Records, 2014)

With Dan Phillips Quartet

- Converging Tributaries (Lizard Breath, 2017)

With Predella Group

- Strade D'Acqua / Roads Of Water (Multikulti Project, 2011)

With Paul Rutherford

- Chicago 2002 (Emanem Records, 2002)

With School Days

- Crossing Division (Okka Disk, 2001)
- In Our Times (Okka Disk, 2002)

With School Days And The Thing, Presented By Mats Gustafsson

- The Music Of Norman Howard (Anagram Records, 2002)

With Ted Sirota's Rebel Souls

- Breeding Resistance (Delmark Records, 2004)

With Terminal 4

- Terminal 4 (Atavistic Records / Truckstop, 2001) (trombone, guitar)
- When I'm Falling (Atavistic Records / Truckstop, 2001) (trombone, guitar)

With The TERRITORY BAND

- Territory Band-1: Transatlantic Bridge (Okka Disk, 2001)
- Territory Band-2: Atlas (Okka Disk, 2002)
- Territory Band-3: Map Theory (Okka Disk, 2004)
- Territory Band-4: Company Switch (Okka Disk, 2005)

With The Vandermark 5

- Single Piece Flow (Atavistic, 1997) (trombone, guitar)
- Every Tuesday At The Empty Bottle The Vandermark 5 Will Pour An Ocean Of Sound Into Your Bucket. Drink, Don't Drown. (Savage Sound Syndicate, 1997) (trombone, guitar)
- Target or Flag (Atavistic Records, 1998) (trombone, guitar)
- Simpatico (Atavistic Records, 1999) (trombone, guitar)
- Every Tuesday At The Empty Bottle The Battle For Supremacy Continues: The Vandermark 5 Vs. Santo, El Enmascarado De Plata - Thinking On One's Feet. (Savage Sound Syndicate, 1999) (trombone, guitar)
- Burn The Incline (Atavistic Records, 2000) (trombone, guitar)
- Acoustic Machine (Atavistic Records, 2001)
- Free Jazz Classics Vol. 1 & 2 (Atavistic Records, 2002)
- Airports For Light (Atavistic Records, 2003)
- Elements Of Style, Exercises In Surprise (Atavistic Records, 2004)
- The Color Of Memory (Atavistic Records, 2005)
- Alchemia (Not Two Records, 2005)
- Free Jazz Classics Vol. 3 & 4 (Atavistic Records, 2006)

With The Whammies

- Play The Music Of Steve Lacy (Driff Records, 2012)
- Play The Music Of Steve Lacy Vol. 2 (Driff Records, 2013)
- Play The Music Of Steve Lacy Vol. 3, Live (Driff Records, 2014)

With Zu

- Igneo (Wide Records, 2002)

== Rock collaborations ==
- Metal Pitcher: A Careful Workman Is The Best Safety Device (7") (Merge Records, 1989) (drums)
- The Angels of Epistemology: The Angels of Epistemology (EP) (Merge Records, 1991) (guitar, bass, vocals, keyboard)
- The Angels of Epistemology: Fruit (Merge Records, 1995) (guitar, bass, other strings, vocals, keyboard, trombone)

== As rock/pop/electronic sideman ==
With Olivia Block
- Pure Gaze (Sedimental Records, 1999)
- Change Ringing (Cut Records, 2005)

With Cheer-Accident

- Enduring The American Dream (Pravda, 1997)
- Salad Days (Skin Graft, 2000)

With Gastr Del Sol

- The Harp Factory on Lake Street (Table of the Elements, 1995)
- Camoufleur (Drag City, 1998)

With In Zenith

- Building A Better Future (Miguel Recordings, 1998) (trombone, guitar, bass)

With Markéta Irglová

- Anar (Markéta Irglová, 2011)

With Simon Joyner

- The Lousy Dance (Truckstop, 1999)

With Mount Moriah

- How to Dance (Mount Moriah, 2016)

With Chris Mills

- The Silver Line (Powerless Pop Recorders, 2002)

With Rian Murphy & Will Oldham

- All Most Heaven (Drag City, 2000)

With Jim O'Rourke (musician)

- Bad Timing (Drag City, 1997)
- Eureka (Jim O'Rourke album) (Drag City, 1999)

With Portastatic

- De Mel, De Melão (Merge Records, 2000)

With Stereolab

- Dots and Loops (Duophonic Ultra High Frequency Disks, 1997)
- Sound-Dust (Duophonic Ultra High Frequency Disks, 2001)

With Superchunk

- Come Pick Me Up (Merge Records, 1999)
