= Solid Action (Ken Vandermark album) =

Studio album by Ken Vandermark
- Released: 1994
- Recorded: May 29 & 30, 1994
- Studio: Acme Recording Studio, Chicago
- Genre: Jazz
- Length: 61:12
- Label: Platypus

Ken Vandermark chronology
Caffeine (1994)	Solid Action (1994)	Standards (1995)

Solid Action is an album by the American jazz reedist Ken Vandermark, recorded in 1994 and released on Platypus. It was the second record by the Vandermark Quartet, which includes bassist Kent Kessler, drummer Michael Zerang and multi-instrumentalist Daniel Scanlan replacing former guitarist Todd Colburn.

== Reception ==
Professional ratings
Review scores
Source	Rating
AllMusic	4/5 stars
DownBeat	4/5 stars
The Penguin Guide to Jazz	3.5/4 stars

In his review for AllMusic, Thom Jurek states: "Listening to this music now is breathtaking; it feels shamanic and brave and it engages the listener immediately with the force of both conviction and humor."

The Penguin Guide to Jazz claims that "Solid Action is Vandermark's first shot at greatness, with Scanlan a tremendously exciting figure on all of three of his instruments."

The DownBeat review by Bill Shoemaker states: "This band's second outing is a persuasive statement of Vandermark's ability to harness rock's gut-rending intensity to post-Coleman jazz's quest for liberating new structures."

== Track listing ==
All compositions by Ken Vandermark except as indicated

1. "Tasteless" – 4:14
2. "Catch 22" – 15:32
3. "Le Saucisse de Fer" (Michael Zerang) – 6:40
4. "Bucket" – 14:36
5. "Leadfoot" – 5:30
6. "For What It Is" (Todd Colburn) – 5:24
7. "Let's Talk About Death" (Kent Kessler) – 9:16

== Personnel ==
- Ken Vandermark – tenor saxophone, clarinet, bass clarinet
- Daniel Scanlan – violin, guitar, cornet
- Kent Kessler – bass
- Michael Zerang – drums
