= American Landscapes =

Live album by Peter Brötzmann Chicago Tentet
- Released: 2007
- Recorded: May 28, 2006
- Venues: Le Weekend in the Tolbooth, Stirling, Scotland
- Genre: Free jazz
- Length: 43:38; 52:48
- Labels: Okka Disk; OD12067 / OD12068
- Producers: Bruno Johnson, Peter Brötzmann

Peter Brötzmann chronology
One Night in Burmantofts (2007)	American Landscapes (2007)	The Fat is Gone (2007)

Volume Two cover

American Landscapes, volumes 1 and 2, is a pair of live albums by the Peter Brötzmann Chicago Tentet, led by saxophonist Brötzmann, and featuring a ten-piece ensemble. Documenting performances of two large-scale works, they were recorded on May 28, 2006, at Le Weekend in the Tolbooth at Stirling, Scotland, and were released on CD in 2007 by Okka Disk. On the albums, Brötzmann is joined by saxophonists Mats Gustafsson and Ken Vandermark, trumpeter and saxophonist Joe McPhee, trombonist Johannes Bauer, tubist Per-Ake Holmlander, cellist Fred Lonberg-Holm, double bassists Kent Kessler and William Parker, and drummers Paal Nilssen-Love and Michael Zerang.

== Reception ==
Professional ratings
Review scores
Source	Rating
The Penguin Guide to Jazz	4/4 stars
Tom Hull – on the Web	B+

The authors of The Penguin Guide to Jazz Recordings awarded the albums a full 4 stars, and wrote: "There was a mass of good music from the Tentet, easily worthy of two volumes, and the addition of trombone... and tuba restores something of an earlier sound to Brötzmann's ensemble-work."

Critic Tom Hull assigned both volumes grades of "B+" and awarded them "honorable mentions" in his October 16, 2007, Village Voice column, commenting "Big birds have deep, rumbling hearts... which swell over time, pumping longer and louder."

Mark Corroto of All About Jazz commented: "Brötzmann's recent compositions allow for quiet resolutions and improvised interludes that pair players up... But always there is the power of the bigger group lurking. It bubbles up repeatedly, offering the crowd what they've come for. But tucked inside the thunder are composed lines that sway and sizzle."

== Track listings ==
Volume 1

1. "American Landscapes 1" – 43:39

Volume 2

1. "American Landscapes 2" – 52:48

== Personnel ==
- Peter Brötzmann – tenor saxophone, alto saxophone, clarinet, tárogató
- Mats Gustafsson – baritone saxophone, slide saxophone
- Ken Vandermark – baritone saxophone, tenor saxophone, clarinet
- Joe McPhee – trumpet, alto saxophone
- Johannes Bauer – trombone
- Per-Ake Holmlander – tuba
- Fred Lonberg-Holm – cello
- Kent Kessler – double bass
- William Parker – double bass
- Paal Nilssen-Love – drums
- Michael Zerang – drums
