= Fred Lonberg-Holm =

American cellist based in Chicago (born 1962)

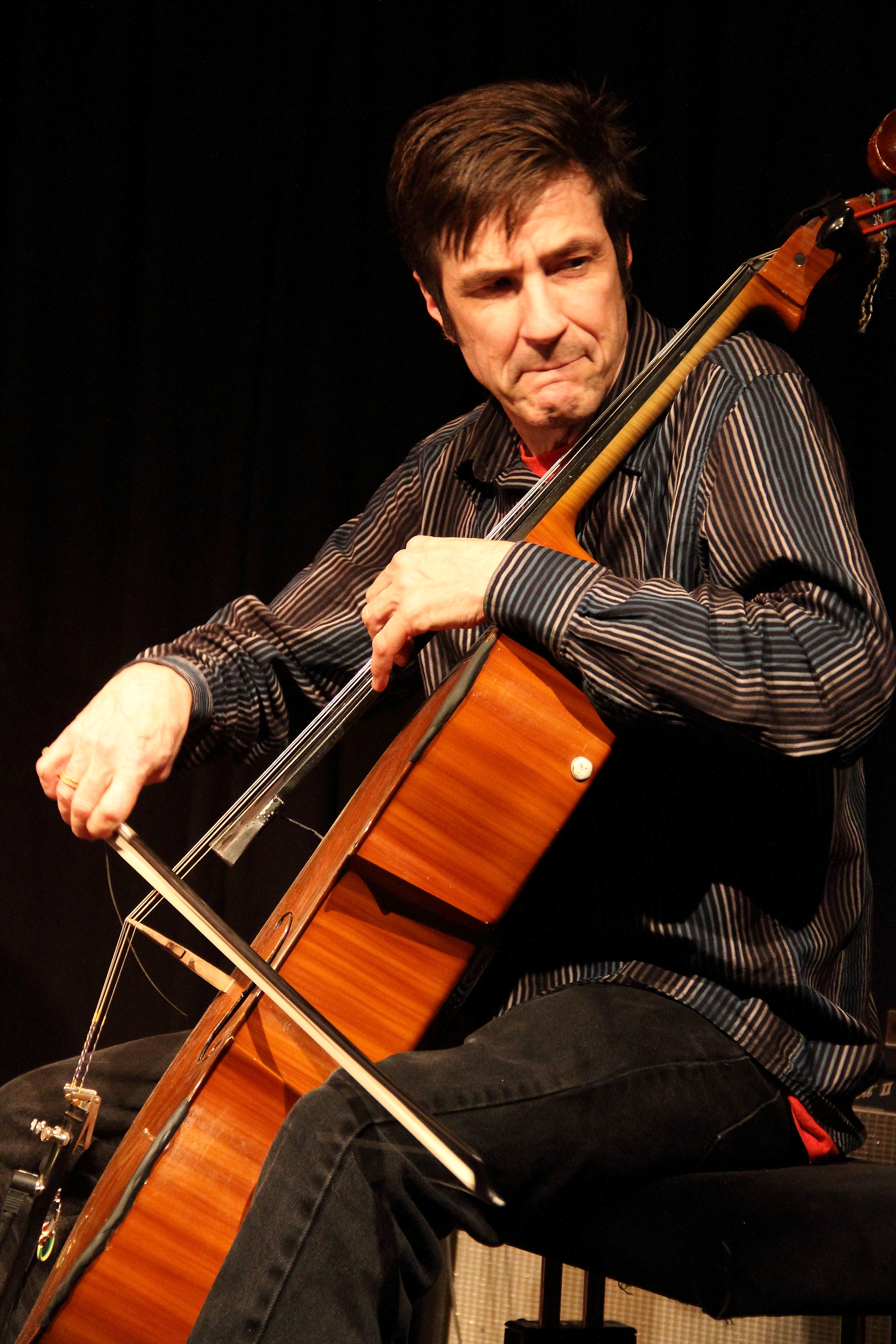
- Fred Lonberg-Holm in 2018

Background information
- Born: 1 October 1962 (age 63); Delaware
- Genres: Free jazz
- Occupation: Musician
- Instrument: Cello
- Website: onberg-holm.info

Fred Lonberg-Holm (born 1 October 1962) is an American cellist based in Chicago. He moved from New York City to Chicago in 1995. He refers to himself as the anti-cellist.

Lonberg-Holm is most identified with playing free improvisation and free jazz. He is also a composer of concert works. As a session musician and arranger, he is credited on rock, pop, and country records.

== As leader ==
Lonberg-Holm has led Valentine Trio, with Jason Roebke (bass) and Frank Rosaly (drums). This jazz trio performs original compositions as well as tunes by both jazz composers (e.g. Sun Ra) and pop songwriters (e.g. Jeff Tweedy, Syd Barrett). The group released its first album, Terminal Valentine, in 2007, which was reviewed by AllAboutJazz critic Nils Jacobson.

He has directed performances of his Lightbox Orchestra, an improvising ensemble with a flexible, ever-changing membership. Lonberg-Holm does not play an instrument in this group but rather conducts its non-idiomatic improvisations via the "lightbox" and by holding up handwritten signs. The lightbox contains a light bulb for each musician which Lonberg-Holm switches on or off to suggest when they should play.

== Other groups ==
Lonberg-Holm was a member of Terminal 4, which released an album in 2003 called When I'm Falling that received four and a half stars by Allmusic, The Boxhead' Ensemble, Pillow, the Lonberg-Holm/Kessler/Zerang trio (with Kent Kessler and Michael Zerang), and the Dörner/Lonberg-Holm duo (with Axel Dörner). He has been a member of the Vandermark 5 and Vandermark's Territory Band, the Joe McPhee Trio, the Peter Brötzmann Chicago Tentet, and Keefe Jackson's Fast Citizens.

When he lived in New York, Lonberg-Holm collaborated with the rock group God Is My Co-Pilot pianist and composer Anthony Coleman as well as multi-instrumentalist Paul Duncan of Warm Ghost. In Chicago, he worked with Jim O'Rourke, Bobby Conn, The Flying Luttenbachers, Lake of Dracula, Wilco, Rivulets, Mats Gustafsson, Sten Sandell, Jaap Blonk, and John Butcher.

== As composer ==
Lonberg-Holm's concert works have been premiered by William Winant, Carrie Biolo, the Austin New Music Co-Op, Subtropics Ensemble, Duo Atypica, the Schanzer/Speach Duo, New Winds, Paul Hoskin, Kevin Norton, the E.S.P. Ensemble, and others.

His scores for dance have been performed at the Brooklyn Academy of Music and Dance Theater Workshop as well as many other venues.

He is a former composition student of Anthony Braxton and Morton Feldman.

He performed improvised music in the role of a troubled composer who finds inspiration in the love of a couple he spots on the street in a short film for the Playboy channel.

== Discography ==
=== As leader or co-leader ===
- Theory of Motion (Curious/Pogus, 1990)
- Solos and Trios (Curious/Collision, 1991)
- Personal Scratch (EDM, 1996)
- Joy of Being (Knitting Factory, 1997)
- Building a Better Future (Miguel, 1998)
- Terminal 4 (Atavistic, 2001)
- A Valentine for Fred Katz (Atavistic, 2002)
- When I'm Falling (Truck Stop, 2003)
- Dialogs (Emanem, 2004) Reviewed by AllAboutJazz
- Other Valentines (Atavistic, 2005)
- Terminal Valentine (Atavistic, 2007)
- The Brain of the Dog in Section (Atavistic, 2008) with Peter Brötzmann
- VCDC (Hispid, 2011)
- Gather (Delmark, 2012)
- Memories of a Tunicate (Relative Pitch, 2020) with Peter Brötzmann

=== As sideman ===
With the Peter Brötzmann Chicago Octet/Tentet

- The Chicago Octet/Tentet (Okka Disc, 1998)
- Stone/Water (Okka Disc, 2000)
- American Landscapes 1 (Okka Disc, 2007)
- American Landscapes 2 (Okka Disc, 2007)
- 3 Nights in Oslo (Smalltown Superjazzz, 2010)

With Anthony Coleman

- Selfhaters (Tzadik, 1996)
- The Abysmal Richness of the Infinite Proximity of the Same (Tzadik, 1998)

With Paul Rutherford

- Chicago 2002 (Emanem, 2002)

With Stirrup

- Sewn (482 Music, 2013)
- A Man Can't Ride on One (Whistler, 2015)

With Tomeka Reid

- Eight Pieces for Two Cellos (Corbett vs. Dempsey 2022)
