= Memories of a Tunicate =

Studio album by Peter Brötzmann and Fred Lonberg-Holm
- Released: 2020
- Recorded: June 12, 2019
- Studio: GSI Studios, New York City
- Genre: Free improvisation
- Label: Relative Pitch; RPR1104

Peter Brötzmann chronology
At Mu (2020)	Memories of a Tunicate (2020)	Bambule! (2021)

Memories of a Tunicate is an album by saxophonist Peter Brötzmann and cellist and electronic musician Fred Lonberg-Holm. Featuring seven free improvisations named after various types of tunicate, it was recorded on June 12, 2019, at GSI Studios in New York City, and was released in 2020 by Relative Pitch Records.

== Reception ==
Professional ratings
Review scores
Source	Rating
All About Jazz	4.5/5 stars
The Free Jazz Collective	4/5 stars
Tom Hull – on the Web	B+

In a review for All About Jazz, Mark Corroto wrote: "This music is... not a face-off but a flow. Blasts of sound are tagged and escorted rather than opposed. Like the individual track titles... the music is designed (actually, improvised) to be shrouded and a bit surprising... This is one entertaining and exhausting recording."

Dusted Magazine's Derek Taylor commented: "Lonberg-Holm's long injected elements of overt humor into his music. Brötzmann, by contrast, still gets erroneously associated with stoicism and seriousness... Comedy of extremes is part of the conversation from the jump. The biological transitions of the tunicate serve as an equally humorous and apposite metaphor for the trajectory of modern life."

Eyal Hareuveni of The Free Jazz Collective described the music as "raw, muscular, and brutal," and stated: "Brötzmann and Lonberg-Holm sound energetic, charged with a ton of fresh, urgent ideas and eager to comment on each other's gestures... both feed each other's moves and ignite many intense, explosive moments."

Writing for the Chicago Reader, Bill Meyer noted that the seven tracks as "musically varied but consistent in their dark emotional tone," and remarked: "If you're looking for a soundtrack to your opening-up party, you should look elsewhere, but if you need to hear something that takes the full measure of what it feels like when things end, this album is your companion."

In an article for JazzWord, Ken Waxman wrote: "Until the more inevitable dampened finale, Memories of a Tunicate's seven tracks are dedicated to augmented and jagged sonority. Brötzmann... has been expressing himself with nephritic and emphasized tones since his first gig. Still with his craggy swipes and stops augmented by electronics, Lonberg-Holm never shrinks from the challenge with most tracks dedicated to the two advancing the narratives in skewed double counterpoint."

Anthony Osborne of A Jazz Noise included the album in his "2020 Picks," commenting: "This duo have played together many times over the years, in many different line-ups – this is one of their best outings yet."

== Track listing ==
1. "Doliolid" – 12:01
2. "Octacnemidae" – 10:33
3. "Pyrosomes" – 9:28
4. "Salp" – 4:32
5. "Thalicia" – 5:51
6. "Aplousobranchia" – 12:19
7. "Stolidobranchia" – 8:10

== Personnel ==
- Peter Brötzmann – tenor saxophone, B♭ clarinet, tárogató
- Fred Lonberg-Holm – cello, electronics
