= Air: Above and Beyond =

Live album by Trio X
- Released: 2007
- Recorded: June 15, 2006 at the Suoni per il Popolo Festival in Montreal, Canada.
- Genre: Jazz
- Label: CIMP CIMPol 5001

Joe McPhee chronology
The Open Door (2006)	Air: Above and Beyond (2007)	Voices: 10 Improvisations (2006)

Air: Above and Beyond is a live album performed by multi-instrumentalist Joe McPhee's Trio X recorded in Canada in 2006 and first released on the CIMP label.

== Reception ==
All About Jazz said "it's memorable set" and "For those who are used to the tenor-bass-drums setup as something frequently given to full-bore blowing, Trio X eloquently captures the tension before the release".

== Track listing ==
All compositions by Joe McPhee, Dominic Duval and Jay Rosen except as indicated

1. "Fried Grapefruit" - 16:30
2. "Jump Spring" - 10:57
3. "2128½ Indiana" - 8:15
4. "Close Up" - 7:31
5. "Give Us This Day" - 10:22
6. "Here's That Rainy Day" (Jimmy Van Heusen, Johnny Burke) - 5:41
7. "A Valentine in the Fog of War" - 8:27

== Personnel ==
- Joe McPhee - tenor saxophone
- Dominic Duval - bass
- Jay Rosen - drums
