= 3 Nights in Oslo =

Live album by Peter Brötzmann Chicago Tentet + 1
- Released: 2010
- Recorded: February 19–21, 2009
- Venues: Victoria, Nasjonal Jazzscene, Oslo, Norway
- Genre: Free jazz
- Labels: Smalltown Superjazzz; STSJ197CD
- Producers: Paal Nilssen-Love, Peter Brötzmann

Peter Brötzmann chronology
Brøtzmann / Drake (2010)	3 Nights in Oslo (2010)	Goosetalks (2010)

3 Nights in Oslo is a five-disc live box set album by the Peter Brötzmann Chicago Tentet + 1, led by saxophonist Brötzmann, and featuring an eleven-piece ensemble. It was recorded during February 19–21, 2009, at Victoria, Nasjonal Jazzscene in Oslo, Norway, and was released on CD in 2010 by the Norwegian Smalltown Superjazzz label. On the album, Brötzmann is joined by saxophonists Mats Gustafsson and Ken Vandermark, trumpeter and saxophonist Joe McPhee, trombonists Jeb Bishop and Johannes Bauer, tubist Per Åke Holmlander, cellist Fred Lonberg-Holm, double bassist Kent Kessler, and drummers Paal Nilssen-Love and Michael Zerang. The entire ensemble is heard on discs 1 and 5, while the remaining discs feature duo, trio, and quartet combinations.

== Reception ==
Professional ratings
Review scores
Source	Rating
The Free Jazz Collective	4/5 stars
The Guardian	5/5 stars
Tom Hull – on the Web	B+

The Guardian's John Fordham awarded the album a rare full five stars, describing it as "flat-out, no-prisoners, no-tunes free-jazz improvisation." He commented: "Sometimes the group's anthemic sax-choir sound suggests the roots of this approach in John Coltrane's Ascension, but there are fascinating subgroups... It's a virtuosic field day for free-jazz admirers with strong nerves."

Lloyd N. Peterson Jr. of All About Jazz wrote: "there may not be a more creative group of artists anywhere within the boundaries of any art form than those within the Peter Brotzmann Tentet... these are individuals that comprehensively understand their responsibility to art and it is only through this level of integrity and creativity that art can, and will continue to move forward... It is a transcendent music for future generations but perhaps even more important, its brilliance personifies the humility and discovery of our artistic and spiritual realm of existence."

The Free Jazz Collective's Stef Gijssels called the band "the absolute crème-de-la-crème of today's free jazz," and described the music as "magnificent: wild, predictably unpredictable, raw, overwhelming, gargantuan, energetic, forceful... it is absolute fabulous fun for the lovers. You can laugh because of the sheer power and chaos, but the musicians are clever enough to vary with slower, often moving and sensitive moments, giving both artists and listeners a break before all hell breaks loose again."

Writing for JazzWord, Ken Waxman remarked: "The two CDs featuring the ensemble are filled with the palpable excitement from 11 players collectively honking, fluttering and snorting... the band has such control that the climax isn't blood vessel bursting flashiness, but contrapuntal divisions exposing every texture."

== Track listing ==
Disc I - Chicago Tentet + 1

1. "Untitled" – 53:15

Disc II - Sonore, Zerang/Nilssen-Love, Bauer/Holmlander

1. "Untitled" (Sonore: Ken Vandermark, Mats Gustafsson, Peter Brötzmann) – 12:48
2. "Untitled" (Sonore: Ken Vandermark, Mats Gustafsson, Peter Brötzmann) – 11:25
3. "Untitled" (Michael Zerang / Paal Nilssen-Love) – 22:27
4. "Untitled" (Johannes Bauer / Per Åke Holmlander) – 10:54
5. "Untitled" (Johannes Bauer / Per Åke Holmlander) – 7:21

Disc III - McPhee/Vandermark, Bishop/Nilssen-Love

1. "Untitled" (Joe McPhee / Ken Vandermark) – 9:38
2. "Untitled" (Joe McPhee / Ken Vandermark) – 10:14
3. "Untitled" (Jeb Bishop / Paal Nilssen-Love) – 15:00
4. "Untitled" (Jeb Bishop / Paal Nilssen-Love) – 14:36

Disc IV - Survival Unit III, Trombone Choir

1. "Untitled" (Survival Unit III: Fred Lonberg-Holm, Joe McPhee, Michael Zerang) – 15:10
2. "Untitled" (Survival Unit III: Fred Lonberg-Holm, Joe McPhee, Michael Zerang) – 10:50
3. "Untitled" (Trombone Choir: Jeb Bishop, Joe McPhee, Johannes Bauer, Per Åke Holmlander) – 13:01
4. "Untitled" (Trombone Choir: Jeb Bishop, Joe McPhee, Johannes Bauer, Per Åke Holmlander) – 8:09
5. "Untitled" (Trombone Choir: Jeb Bishop, Joe McPhee, Johannes Bauer, Per Åke Holmlander) – 4:08

Disc V - Chicago Tentet + 1

1. "Untitled" – 36:32
2. "Untitled" – 16:28

== Personnel ==
- Peter Brötzmann – reeds
- Mats Gustafsson – reeds
- Ken Vandermark – reeds
- Joe McPhee – trumpet, saxophone
- Jeb Bishop – trombone
- Johannes Bauer – trombone
- Per Åke Holmlander – tuba
- Fred Lonberg-Holm – cello
- Kent Kessler – double bass
- Paal Nilssen-Love – drums
- Michael Zerang – drums
