= Bull Fiddle =

Studio album by Kent Kessler
- Released: 2002
- Recorded: June 6, 2001
- Studios: Airwave Studios, Chicago
- Genre: Free jazz
- Length: 46:38
- Labels: Okka Disk; OD12038
- Producer: Kent Kessler

Bull Fiddle is a solo bass album by Kent Kessler, his first release under his own name. It was recorded on June 6, 2001, at Airwave Studios in Chicago, and was released in 2002 by Okka Disk. Kessler is joined by percussionist Michael Zerang on three tracks.

In an interview, Kessler stated: "Bull fiddle is what my grandpa called the bass... He was a Kentucky Hoosier who moved to Indiana and called square dances and stuff. I have a real connection with roots music, so I wanted to convey that at some level this music is no different than hillbilly music."

== Reception ==
In a review for All About Jazz, Derek Taylor called the album "a program of highly intimate improvisations," and wrote: "Kessler rides his bull fiddle with a steady finesse and practiced prowess that immediately lassoes the ear... Through it all Kessler comes across as an improvisor genuinely and profoundly infatuated with his instrument and the breadth of music its manipulated surfaces can unlock. He couples an academician's awe with a guiding desire for more visceral pleasures."

Jason Bivins of Dusted Magazine stated: "The names of the tracks... testify to Kessler's Midwestern upbringing and also to his time logged in tour vehicles of various sorts. But his playing gives the impression of a sound and a concept that is sturdy and steadfast amid all the motion... Kessler's voice emerges very distinctly... the highly personal nature of these pieces will win over most every listener."

Writing for JazzWord, Ken Waxman commented: "Kessler ranges all over the strings, often interrupting his firm, virile tone for extended techniques involving buzzing strings, wood scratching, rumbles, bangs and shakes." He described "Central Wisconsin Double Wide" as "the most cinematic" track, and remarked: "Beginning with arco tones that sound like a locomotive going down the tracks, he then begins to double and triple stop, with the theme unrolling at faster and faster tempo as he plays. Exhibiting a relaxed briskness, he bows more than one string at a time, produces some screechy overtones then reverberations, as he explores the sound. Reaching the destination the sonics fade away."

== Track listing ==
"Batum Schrag," "Waddy Peytona," and "Gillman Chatsworth" composed by Kent Kessler and Michael Zerang. Remaining tracks composed by Kent Kessler.

1. "Monon Line" – 2:44
2. "Spillway" – 1:00
3. "Batum Schrag" – 3:34
4. "Word Edgewise" – 1:09
5. "Sugar Creek" – 5:13
6. "Furthermore" – 1:42
7. "Waddy Peytona" – 3:44
8. "That Is" – 2:49
9. "Central Wisconsin Double Wide" – 10:35
10. "Out of Iowa" – 5:26
11. "Gilman Chatsworth" – 3:19
12. "Pikeville Girl" – 4:43

== Personnel ==
- Kent Kessler – bass
- Michael Zerang – goblet drum (dumbek) (tracks 3, 7, 11)
