= Michael Zerang =

American jazz percussionist and drummer (born 1958)

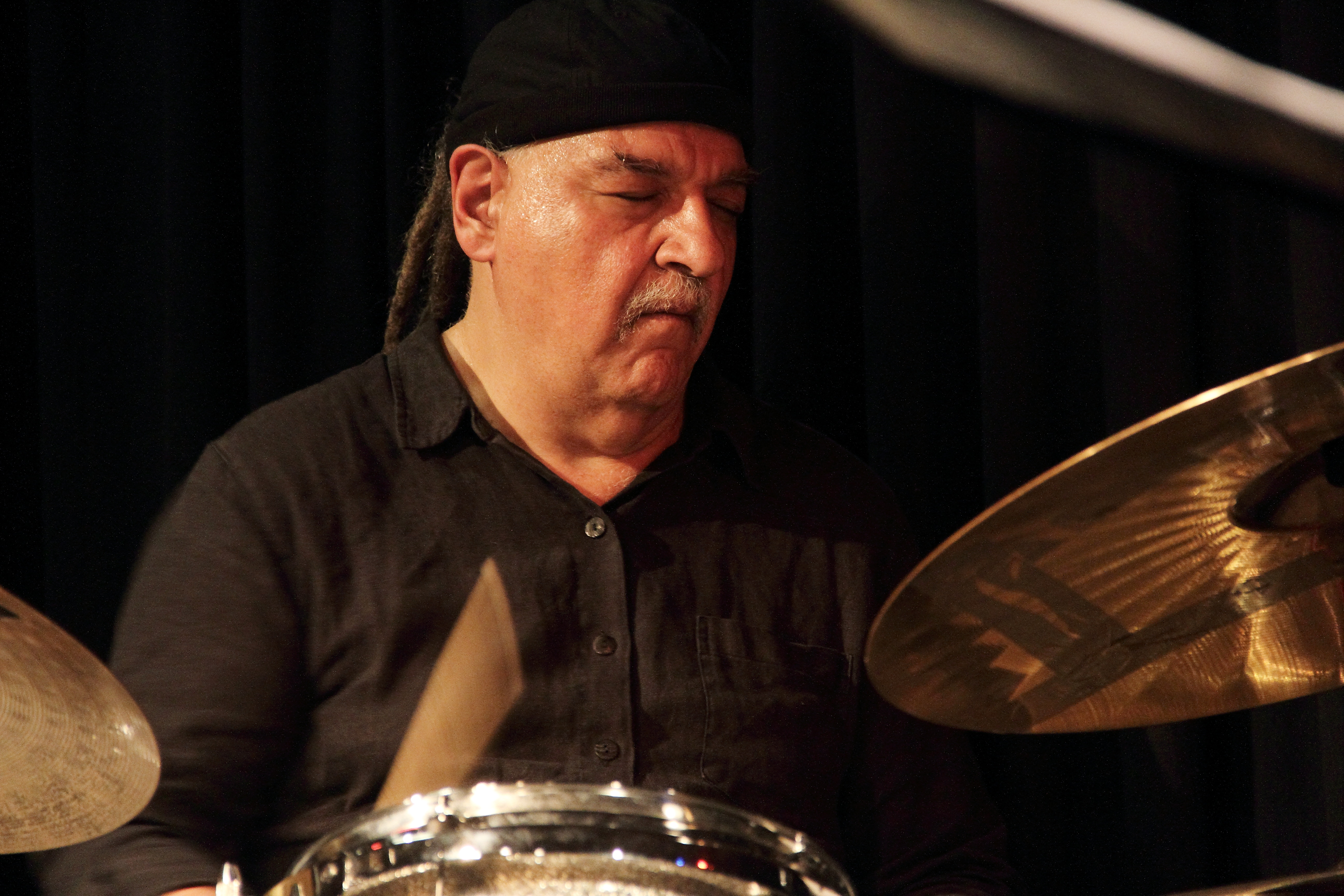
- Zerang performing in 2018

Background information
- Born: November 16, 1958 (age 66); Chicago, Illinois, U.S.
- Genres: Jazz
- Occupation: Musician
- Instrument: Drums

Michael Zerang (born November 16, 1958) is an American jazz percussionist and drummer.

== Career ==
Zerang's parents both emigrated to the United States from the Middle East; his father is Iranian and his mother Iraqi. He began playing professionally in 1976 with Kent Kessler and studied at Wilbur Wright College from 1977 to 1978 and Roosevelt College from 1978 to 1982.

Zerang has played with Dave Rempis, Edward Wilkerson, Fred Anderson, Fred Lonberg-Holm, Jeff Parker, Joe McPhee, Josh Berman, Kent Kessler, Luc Houtkamp, Elisabeth Harnik, Kevin Drumm, Scott Fields, Mars Williams, Tatsu Aoki, and Hamid Drake. He has also played with international musicians such as Axel Dörner, Fredy Studer, Hannes Bauer, Jaap Blonk, Mats Gustafsson, Mazen Kerbaj, Peter Brötzmann, and Tobias Delius. He has been a jazz educator at the Art Institute of Chicago and Northwestern University in addition to founding and directing the Link's Hall Performance Series from 1985 to 1989.

See also Winter solstice concerts by Drake & Zerang Duo.

== Discography ==
=== As leader ===
- Improvisors (Kontrans, 1996)
- Redmoon Theater's the Ballad of Frankie and Johnny (Eighth Day Music, 1997)
- 35 Grapes (19 Sown) (BoxMedia, 1998)
- Scratch Match (Penumbra, 2000)
- Guts (OkkaDisk, 2007)
- Cardinal Point (Fundacja Słuchaj, 2020)

=== As guest ===
- The Chicago Octet/Tentet with the Peter Brötzmann Chicago Octet/Tentet (Okka Disk, 1998)
- Stone/Water with the Peter Brötzmann Chicago Tentet (Okka Disk, 2000)
- Bull Fiddle with Kent Kessler (Okka Disk, 2002)
- Tales Out of Time with Peter Brötzmann, Joe McPhee, and Kent Kessler (Hathut, 2004)
- Transmutations with Yakuza (Prosthetic, 2007)
- American Landscapes 1 with the Peter Brötzmann Chicago Tentet (Okka Disc, 2007)
- American Landscapes 2 with the Peter Brötzmann Chicago Tentet (Okka Disc, 2007)
- 3 Nights in Oslo with the Peter Brötzmann Chicago Tentet + 1 (Smalltown Superjazzz, 2010)
- Represencing with Joshua Abrams (Eremite, 2012)
- What Else is There? with Karl Evangelista, Alexander Hawkins, and Tatsu Aoki ((Fundacja Słuchaj, 2023)
