= Old Eyes (album) =

Studio album by Joe McPhee
- Released: 1980
- Recorded: May 30, 1979 in Paris, France and January 9, 1990 at Studio 2 Radio DRS, in Zurich, Switzerland (Bonus tracks)
- Genre: Jazz
- Length: 74:42
- Label: HatHut hat HUT 1RO~1
- Producer: Pia & Werner X. Uehlinger

Joe McPhee chronology
MFG in Minnesota (1978)	Old Eyes (1980)	Tales and Prophecies (1981)

Old Eyes & Mysteries Cover

Old Eyes is an album by multi-instrumentalist and composer Joe McPhee, recorded in 1979 and first released on the Swiss HatHut label in 1980. It was rereleased on CD in 1992 as Old Eyes & Mysteries with bonus tracks recorded in 1990.

== Reception ==
Professional ratings
Review scores
Source	Rating
Allmusic	4/5 stars

Allmusic awarded the album 4 stars.

== Track listing ==
All compositions by Joe McPhee

1. "Eroc Tinu" - 4:00
2. "Land Dance" - 12:45
  1. "P / G / G"
  2. "BCL / Cello""
  3. "B / DM"
  4. "TS / TS"
3. "Old Eyes" - 8:50
4. "Django" (John Lewis) - 14:25
5. "No Line" - 3:05
6. "Strings" - 7:10
7. "Women's Mysteries: Woman of Darkness" - 8:56 Bonus track on CD reissue
8. "Women's Mysteries: Woman of Passion" - 4:41 Bonus track on CD reissue
9. "Women's Mysteries: Woman of Lotus" - 5:02 Bonus track on CD reissue
10. "Women's Mysteries: Woman of Skies" - 5:28 Bonus track on CD reissue

== Personnel ==
- Joe McPhee - tenor saxophone, alto saxophone, flugelhorn, trumpet
- Urs Leimgruber - tenor saxophone, soprano saxophone (tracks 7–10)
- André Jaume - tenor saxophone, bass clarinet (tracks 1–6)
- Raymond Boni, Steve Gnitka - guitar (tracks 1–6)
- Jean-Charles Capon - cello (tracks 1–6)
- Pierre-Yves Sorin - bass (tracks 1–6)
- Milo Fine - piano, drums (tracks 1–6)
- Fritz Hauser - drums, percussion (tracks 7–10)
