= The Chicago Octet/Tentet =

Live album by Peter Brötzmann
- Released: 1998
- Recorded: January 29, 1997; September 16, 1997; September 17, 1997
- Venue: The Empty Bottle, Chicago
- Studio: AirWave Studio, Chicago
- Genre: Free jazz
- Length: 3:34:28
- Label: Okka Disk; OD 12022
- Producer: Bruno Johnson, John Corbett, Peter Brötzmann

Peter Brötzmann chronology
Songlines (1994)	The Chicago Octet/Tentet (1998)	Stone/Water (2000)

The Chicago Octet/Tentet is a live album by saxophonist Peter Brötzmann on which he is joined by two large ensembles known as the Chicago Octet and Tentet. Six tracks were recorded live at The Empty Bottle in Chicago on January 29, 1997, and September 17, 1997, while the remaining six tracks were recorded at AirWave Studio in Chicago on September 16, 1997. The album was released in 1998 as a limited-edition three-CD set by the Okka Disk label, and, in addition to Brötzmann, features saxophonists Mats Gustafsson, Joe McPhee, Ken Vandermark, and Mars Williams, trombonist Jeb Bishop, cellist Fred Lonberg-Holm, double bassist Kent Kessler, and drummers Hamid Drake and Michael Zerang.

== Reception ==
Professional ratings
Review scores
Source	Rating
AllMusic	4.5/5 stars
The Penguin Guide to Jazz	4/4 stars
The Virgin Encyclopedia of Jazz	3/5 stars

In a review for AllMusic, Joslyn Layne stated that the album "brings together some of the greatest innovators in free jazz... who gel beautifully and energetically," and wrote: "There is structure; there is fire; there is passion; and there is supreme musicianship. There's also such a thing as 'unique voice,' and it's heard all over this box set. With excellent interplay and soloing from all of the musicians... Brotzmann's Tentet shoots sparks when they're low-key, and explodes into grande finale fireworks once they warm up."

The authors of The Penguin Guide to Jazz Recordings awarded the album a full four stars, calling it "a landmark: a major documentation of Brötzmann on an American label, a rare instance of his large-group music, and a definitive meeting with some of the many American masters... who've been influenced by him."

The A.V. Club's Joshua Klein commented: "For anyone interested in the state of free jazz and out composition, The Chicago Octet/Tentet works well as one-stop shopping... Brötzmann and his companions make an impressive racket that is often as beautiful as it is boisterous... With a creative rhythm section anchoring and coloring the compositions, these brass- and woodwind-heavy outfits are simply amazing and, in some cases, nearly essential for fans of modern jazz."

Lee Rice Epstein of The Free Jazz Collective described the album as "a crucial release that broke ground for a major phase of Brötzmann's music," and remarked: "The lineup is mind-blowing, and the music completely knocked me sideways the first time I heard it... the range of Brötzmann's vision has, arguably, rarely reached the highs of this set."

Author Todd S. Jenkins noted that the group "delves into the open-composed neighborhood of Cecil Taylor's large-band work," and praised Brötzmann's "Burning Spirit," which features "a marvelous section wherein various players snatch portions of Brötzmann's tenor solo and make their own variations on them while he continues to unravel his skein of ideas."

Writing for The Wire, Daniel Spicer stated: "this work contains an important kernel of Brötzmann's philosophical message: a proposed answer to the refusenik protestation of Machine Gun in the form of a multinational experiment in practical democracy."

== Track listing ==
Disc 1

1. "Burning Spirit (For Kazuka Shiraishi)" (Peter Brötzmann) – 29:43
2. "Other Brothers" (Ken Vandermark) – 24:38
3. "Old Bottles, No Wine" (Mats Gustafsson) – 9:45
4. "Aziz" (Michael Zerang) – 9:46
- Track 1: Chicago Octet recorded live on January 29, 1997. Tracks 2–4: Chicago Tentet recorded live on September 17, 1997.

Disc 2

1. "Divide by Zero" (Jeb Bishop) – 12:53
2. "Foolish Infinity" (Peter Brötzmann) – 26:44
3. "Immediate Music" (Fred Lonberg-Holm) – 13:51
4. "Makapoor" (Hamid Drake, Michael Zerang) – 12:57
- Tracks 1–2: Chicago Tentet recorded live on September 17, 1997. Tracks 3–4: Chicago Tentet recorded in studio on September 16, 1997.

Disc 3

1. "Foolish Infinity" (Peter Brötzmann) – 26:17
2. "Old Bottles, No Wine" (Mats Gustafsson) – 9:24
3. "Other Brothers" (Ken Vandermark) – 24:47
4. "Divide by Zero" (Jeb Bishop) – 10:39
- All tracks: Chicago Tentet recorded in studio on September 16, 1997.

== Personnel ==
- Peter Brötzmann – tenor saxophone, clarinet, tárogató
- Mats Gustafsson – baritone saxophone, fluteophone
- Joe McPhee – soprano saxophone, pocket cornet, valve trombone
- Ken Vandermark – tenor saxophone, clarinet, bass clarinet
- Mars Williams – tenor saxophone, alto saxophone, soprano saxophone, clarinet
- Jeb Bishop – trombone
- Fred Lonberg-Holm – cello
- Kent Kessler – double bass
- Hamid Drake – drums, percussion
- Michael Zerang – drums, percussion
