= Stone/Water =

Live album by Peter Brötzmann Chicago Tentet
- Released: 2000
- Recorded: May 23, 1999
- Venue: Festival de Musique de Actuelle Victoriaville, Victoriaville, Quebec, Canada
- Genre: Free jazz
- Length: 38:44
- Label: Okka Disk; OD 12032
- Producer: Bruno Johnson, John Corbett, Peter Brötzmann

Peter Brötzmann chronology
The Chicago Octet/Tentet (1998)	Stone/Water (2000)	The Atlanta Concert (2001)

Stone/Water is a live album by the Peter Brötzmann Chicago Tentet, led by saxophonist Brötzmann, and featuring a ten-piece ensemble. Documenting a performance of a single 39-minute work, it was recorded on May 23, 1999, at the Festival de Musique de Actuelle Victoriaville in Victoriaville, Quebec, Canada, and was released on CD in 2000 by Okka Disk. On the album, Brötzmann is joined by saxophonists Mats Gustafsson and Ken Vandermark, trumpeter and electronic musician Toshinori Kondo, trombonist Jeb Bishop, violinist and cellist Fred Lonberg-Holm, double bassists Kent Kessler and William Parker, and percussionists Hamid Drake and Michael Zerang.

== Reception ==
Professional ratings
Review scores
Source	Rating
AllMusic	4/5 stars
The Penguin Guide to Jazz	4/4 stars
Tom Hull – on the Web	B+
The Virgin Encyclopedia of Jazz	3/5 stars

In a review for AllMusic, Brian Olewnick wrote: "Brotzmann's hand-picked cadre of some of the finest young players from the Chicago improvising scene was one of the finest mid-size jazz bands of the late '90s... this release... [is] an excellent entry point into their music. The shortness of the recording is the only possible complaint. Highly recommended."

The authors of The Penguin Guide to Jazz Recordings awarded the album a full 4 stars, and stated: "For all the extraordinary volume on show, this is a remarkable feat of engineering and one that tends to suggest that Brötz has all too rarely had his music documented with this level of accuracy... This leaves the listener breathless."

Writing for The New York Times, Ben Ratliff included the album in his "Critics' Choices" column, and commented: "The greatest hope for free jazz is form. Not to worry: it won't make cultural conservatives out of musicians like Mr. Brotzmann, the brilliant electronics-mad trumpeter Toshinori Kondo and the bassist William Parker. The structuring of this woolly music into contrasting sections and its double rhythmic kick from the drummers Michael Zerang and Hamid Drake provide the album's power."

Michael A. Parker of All About Jazz remarked: "this music reaches points of terrifying intensity at times, although it also balanced by a great deal of more subdued exploration. It seems to alternate between these extremes every few minutes or so, making for a very satisfying experience."

JazzWord's Ken Waxman called the album a "fine session," and wrote: "with a veteran's maturity, the saxophonist now knows exactly when to let 'er rip and when to keep things on a quieter level." However, he noted that "with nearly everyone allowed solo space, focus is sometimes lost."

In an article for The Free Jazz Collective, Nick Metzger stated: "If pressed to recommend a single Chicago Tentet album this is the one I would choose... it's bursting at the seams with inventiveness, contrast, and power... Incredible music."

== Track listing ==
1. "Stone/Water" – 38:44

== Personnel ==
- Peter Brötzmann – tenor saxophone, clarinet
- Mats Gustafsson – tenor saxophone, flutophone
- Ken Vandermark – tenor saxophone, clarinet, bass clarinet
- Toshinori Kondo – trumpet, electronics
- Jeb Bishop – trombone
- Fred Lonberg-Holm – cello, violin
- Kent Kessler – double bass
- William Parker – double bass
- Hamid Drake – drums, percussion
- Michael Zerang – drums
