= Okka Disk =

- Founded: 1994
- Founder: Bruno Johnson
- Genre: Jazz
- Country of origin: U.S.
- Location: Chicago, Illinois; Milwaukee, Wisconsin
- Official website: www.okkadisk.com

Okka Disk is an independent American jazz record company and label founded in Chicago by Bruno Johnson in 1994.

Okka began as a rock music label, but Johnson soon changed direction to record free jazz. Vintage Duets are the unreleased tapes recorded in 1980 by saxophonist Fred Anderson with drummer Steve McCall, and Caffeine, a trio featuring Chicago scene instigator Ken Vandermark. These were the albums that started the label. Okka Disk released many key early works by Ken Vandermark and was partly responsible for Fred Anderson's late-career renaissance.

The label also recorded European free jazz musicians such as Peter Brötzmann, documenting his transatlantic Chicago Octet and Tentet over ten albums. Since 2009, it organizes the Okka Fest, held in Milwaukee, where Johnson moved in 2002.

== Releases ==
- OD12001 Fred Anderson/Steve McCall – Vintage Duets
- OD12002 Caffeine – Caffeine
- OD12003 Marilyn Crispell/Fred Anderson/Hamid Drake – Destiny
- OD12004 Peter Brötzmann/Hamid Drake– The Dried Rat–Dog
- OD12005 Steelwool Trio – International Front
- OD12006 Mats Gustafsson – Parrot Fish Eye
- OD12007 Fred Anderson – Birdhouse
- OD12008 Hamid Drake/Michael Zerang – Ask the Sun
- OD120010 Mats Gustafsson/Barry Guy/Paul Lovens – Mouth Eating Trees and Related Activities
- OD120012 DKV Trio – Baraka
- OD120013 Peter Brötzmann/Mahmoud Gania/Hamid Drake – The Wels Concert
- OD120014 Fred Anderson/ DKV Trio – Fred Anderson / DKV Trio
- OD120016 Joe McPhee/Ken Vandermark/Kent Kessler – A Meeting in Chicago
- OD120017 Evan Parker – Chicago Solo
- OD120018 Anthony Braxton/Georg Gräwe – Duo (Amsterdam) 1991
- OD120019 FJF – Blow Horn
- OD120022 Peter Brötzmann – The Chicago Octet/Tentet
- OD120023 Fred Anderson – Live at the Velvet Lounge
- OD120024 Georg Gräwe – Melodie und Rhythmus
- OD120025 Joe McPhee/Jeb Bishop – The Brass City
- OD120027 Joe Morris/DKV Trio – Deep Telling
- OD120028 Evan Parker/Georg Gräwe – Unity Variations
- OD120029 Jeb Bishop – Jeb Bishop Trio
- OD120030 DKV Trio – Live in Wels & Chicago, 1998
- OD120032 Peter Brötzmann Chicago Tentet – Stone/Water
- OD120033 Evan Parker/Joe McPhee – Chicago Tenor Duets
- OD120034 Loos – Armstrong
- OD120035 AALY Trio/DKV Trio – Double or Nothing
- OD120036 Joe McPhee/Hamid Drake – Emancipation Proclamation: A Real Statement of Freedom
- OD120037 School Days – Crossing Divisions
- OD120038 Kent Kessler – Bull Fiddle
- OD120039 Jeb Bishop – Afternoons
- OD120040 Territory Band 1 – Transatlantic Bridge
- OD120041 School Days – In Our Times
- OD120042 DKV Trio – Trigonometry
- OD120043 Peter Brötzmann Chicago Tentet + 2 – Broken English
- OD120044 Peter Brötzmann Chicago Tentet + 2 – Short Visit to Nowhere
- OD120045 Triage – Twenty Minute Cliff
- OD120046 Ken Vandermark – Furniture Music
- OD120047 Peter Brötzmann Chicago Tentet – Images
- OD120048 Peter Brötzmann Chicago Tentet – Signs
- OD120049 Atomic/School Days– Nuclear Assembly Hall
- OD120050 Territory Band 2 – Atlas
- OD120051 FME – Underground
- OD120052 Triage – American Mithology
- OD120053 Sonore – No One Ever Works Alone
- OD120056 Jim Baker/Steve Hunt/Brian Sandstrom/Mars Williams – Extraordinary Popular Delusions
- OD120057 Jeb Bishop/Dave Rempis/Nate McBride/Tim Daisy – The Engines
- OD120059 Peter Brötzmann Chicago Tentet – Be Music, Night
- OD120060 Territory Band 3 – Map Theory
- OD120061 FME – Cuts
- OD120062 Peter Brötzmann/Joe McPhee/Kent Kessler/Michael Zerang – GUTS
- OD120065 Ken Vandermark/Pandelis Karayorgis – Foreground Music
- OD120067 Peter Brötzmann Chicago Tentet – American Landscapes 1
- OD120068 Peter Brötzmann Chicago Tentet – American Landscapes 2
- OD120070 Territory Band 4 – Company Switch
- OD120071 FME – Montage
- OD120072 Peter Brötzmann Chicago Tentet – At Molde 2007
- OD120073 Atomic/School Days – DISTIL
- OD120075 Ken Vandermark – Collecting Fiction
- OD120076 Peter Brötzmann – Hairy Bones
- OD120077 Artifact iTi – Live in St. Johann
- OD120078 The Frame Quartet – 35 mm
- OD120079 The Engines – Wire and Brass
- OD120080 Territory Band 5 – New Horse for the White House
- OD120083 Sonore – Call Before You Dig
- OD120090 Territory Band 6 – Collide
- OD99721 Ken Vandermark Topology Nonet – Impressions of PO Music
- ODMAR001 The Margots – Pescado

== Limited edition releases ==
- ODL10001 DKV Trio - DKV Live
- ODL10002 Günter Christmann / Mats Gustafsson - One to (Two)...
- ODL10003 Hamid Drake / Mats Gustafsson - For Don Cherry
- ODL10005 Peter Brötzmann / Hamid Drake / Kent Kessler - Live at the Empty Bottle
- ODL10006 Peter Brötzmann / Hamid Drake / Fred Hopkins - The Atlanta Concert
- ODL10007 FME - Live at the Glenn Miller Cafe
- ODL10008 Dave Rempis / Tim Daisy - Back to the Circle
- ODL10009 Paul Lytton / Ken Vandermark / Phil Wachsmann - CINC
- ODL10010 Peter Brötzmann/ Sonny Sharrock - Fragments
- ODL10011 Full Blast + Friends - Crumbling Brain
