= Kent Kessler =

American jazz double-bassist (born 1957)

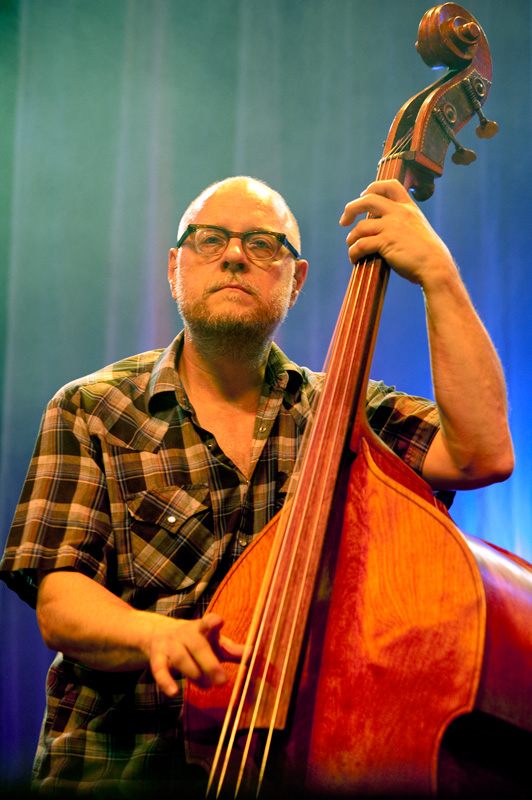
- Kessler performing at the 2010 Moers Festival

Background information
- Born: January 28, 1957; Crawfordsville, Indiana, U.S.
- Genres: Jazz, avant-garde jazz
- Occupation: Musician
- Instrument: Double bass
- Label: Okka Disk

Kent Kessler (born January 28, 1957) is an American jazz double-bassist.

== Career ==
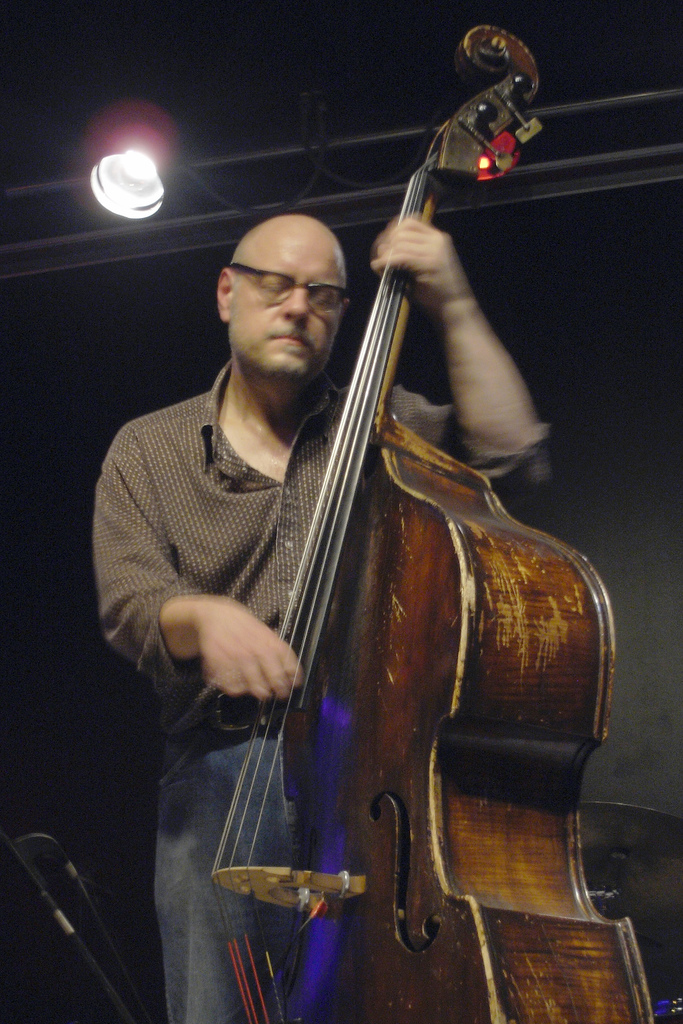
Kessler performing in 2007

Although born in Crawfordsville, Indiana, Kessler grew up on Cape Cod, Massachusetts. He began playing trombone at age ten. When he was thirteen, he moved with his family to Chicago and a few years later became interested in jazz. While attending St. Mary Center for Learning High School, he took lessons in bass guitar and jazz theory from Kestutis Stanciauskas.

In 1977 he formed Neutrino Orchestra with percussionist Michael Zerang and guitarists Dan Scanlan and Norbert Funk. He spent three months in Brazil during 1980–81 and intermittently attended Roosevelt University in Chicago. He and Michael Zerang also formed a group called Musica Menta, which played routinely at Link's Hall.

Kessler began playing double bass in the 1980s. It became his primary instrument in 1985 when he was asked to join the NRG Ensemble, which toured Europe and recorded for ECM under the leadership of Hal Russell until his death in 1992. In 1991 he worked with Zerang and guitarist Chris DeChiara; in need of a hornist, they called Ken Vandermark, who had been considering leaving Chicago. Kessler and Vandermark worked together in the Vandermark 5, the DKV Trio, and the Steelwool Trio.

In the 1990s and afterwards he worked with Hamid Drake, Fred Anderson, and Joe McPhee and with Peter Brötzmann, Mats Gustafsson, Misha Mengelberg, and Luc Houtkamp. In 2003 Okka Disk released his solo album Bull Fiddle.

As of 2021, Kessler has occasionally accompanied Chicago country-music singer-songwriter Jane Baxter Miller, in performance and on record. In the 1990s, Baxter Miller, who is also Kent Kessler's wife, had performed and recorded with his sister Kelly Kessler, as the Texas Rubies country-music duo.

== Discography ==
=== As leader ===
- Bull Fiddle (Okka Disk, 2002)

=== As co-leader or sideman ===
With Boneshaker (Mars Williams, Paal Nilssen-Love, Kent Kessler)

- Boneshaker (Trost, 2012)
- Unusual Words (Soul What, 2014)
- Thinking Out Loud (Trost, 2017)
- Fake Music (Soul What, 2019)

With Peter Brötzmann

- The Chicago Octet/Tentet (Okka Disk, 1998)
- Live at the Empty Bottle (Okka Disk, 1999)
- Stone/Water (Okka Disk, 2000)
- Broken English (Okka Disk, 2002)
- Short Visit to Nowhere (Okka Disk, 2002)
- Tales Out of Time (hatOLOGY, 2004)
- Signs (Okka Disk, 2004)
- Images (Okka Disk, 2004)
- Be Music Night (Okka Disk, 2005)
- Guts (Okka Disk, 2005)
- American Landscapes 1 (Okka Disk, 2007)
- American Landscapes 2 (Okka Disk, 2007)
- At Molde 2007 (Okka Disk, 2008)
- 3 Nights in Oslo (Smalltown Superjazzz, 2010)
- Walk, Love, Sleep (Smalltown Superjazzz, 2012)

With DKV Trio

- Baraka (Okka Disk, 1997)
- DKV Live (Okka Disk, 1997)
- Live in Wels & Chicago 1998 (Okka Disk, 1999)
- Trigonometry (Okka Disk, 2002)
- Double or Nothing (Okka Disk, 2002)
- Collider (Not Two, 2016)
- Latitude 41.88 (Not Two, 2017)

With NRG Ensemble

- Calling All Mothers (Quinnah, 1994)
- This Is My House (Delmark, 1996)
- Bejazzo Gets a Facelift (Atavistic, 1997)

With Hal Russell

- The Finnish/Swiss Tour (ECM, 1991)
- The Hal Russell Story (ECM, 1993)
- Hal on Earth (Abduction, 1995)

With Territory Band

- Transatlantic Bridge (Okka Disk, 2001)
- Atlas (Okka Disk, 2002)
- Map Theory (Okka Disk, 2004)
- Company Switch (Okka Disk, 2005)
- New Horse for the White House (Okka Disk, 2006)
- Collide (Okka Disk, 2007)

With Ken Vandermark

- Big Head Eddie (Platypus, 1993)
- Solid Action (Platypus, 1994)
- Standards (Quinnah, 1995)
- Steelwool Trio (Ken Vandermark/Kent Kessler/Curt Newton): International Front(Okka Disk, 1995)
- Utility Hitter (Quinnah, 1996)
- Steam: Realtime (Jim Baker/Kent Kessler/Tim Mulvenna/Ken Vandermark) (Eighth Day Music, 1997/Atavistic, 2000)
- Single Piece Flow (Atavistic, 1997)
- Target Or Flag (Atavistic, 1998)
- Simpatico (Atavistic, 1999)
- Straight Lines (Atavistic, 1999)
- Burn the Incline (Atavistic, 2000)
- Acoustic Machine (Atavistic, 2001)
- Airports for Light (Atavistic, 2003)
- Elements of Style, Exercises in Surprise (Atavistic, 2004)
- The Color of Memory (Atavistic, 2005)
- A Discontinuous Line (Atavistic, 2006)
- Beat Reader (Atavistic, 2008)
- Collected Fiction (Okka Disk, 2009)
- Annular Gift (Not Two, 2009)
- The Horse Jumps and the Ship Is Gone (Not Two, 2010)
- Impressions of PO Music (Okka Disk, 2013)

With others

- Fred Anderson, Fred Anderson / DKV Trio (Okka Disk, 1997)
- Jane Baxter Miller, Harm Among the Willows (Bloodshot Records, 2010)
- Jeb Bishop, Jeb Bishop Trio, Kent Kessler, Tim Mulvenna (Okka Disk, 1999)
- Jeb Bishop, Afternoons (Okka Disk, 2001)
- Guillermo Gregorio, Degrees of Iconicity (hatART, 2000)
- Peter Kowald, Flats Fixed (Corbett vs. Dempsey, 2014)
- Wayne Kramer, Adult World (Diesel Motor/MuscleTone 2002)
- Fred Lonberg-Holm, At the Hideout Kuro (Neko Music, 2009)
- Fred Lonberg-Holm, Two Lightboxes (Locust Music, 2004)
- Joe McPhee, A Meeting in Chicago (Eighth Day Music, 1997)
- Joe McPhee, The Damage Is Done (Not Two, 2009)
- Misha Mengelberg, Two Days in Chicago (hatOLOGY, 1999)
- Joe Morris, Deep Telling (Okka Disk, 1999)
- Paul Rutherford, Chicago 2002 (Emanem, 2002)
- Mars Williams, Mars Williams Presents: An Ayler Xmas (Soul What, 2017)
- Mars Williams, Mars Williams Presents: An Ayler Xmas Vol. 2 (Soul What, 2018)
- Michael Zerang, Songs from the Big Book of Love (Pink Palace, 2015)
