= Johannes Bauer (musician) =

German jazz trombonist

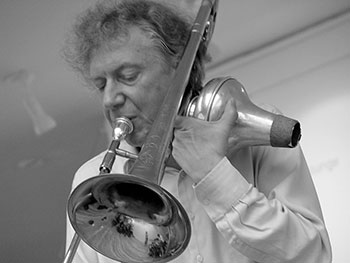
- Bauer in 2015

Background information
- Born: 22 July 1954; Halle, Germany
- Died: 6 May 2016 (aged 61)
- Genres: Free jazz/free improvisation
- Occupation: Trombonist
- Instrument: Trombone

Johannes "Hannes" Bauer (22 July 1954 – 6 May 2016) was a German trombonist of improvised music and free jazz. He was the brother of the trombonist Conny Bauer.

He was born in Halle. From 1979 onwards, he worked as a freelance musician in Berlin.

Among others, he worked with the following groups: the Manfred Schulze Wind Quintet, Doppelmoppel (with Conny Bauer, Uwe Kropinski, and Helmut "Joe" Sachse), Slawterhaus (with Jon Rose, Peter Hollinger, and Dietmar Diesner), Futch (with Thomas Lehn and Jon Rose), Ken Vandermark Territory Band, and the Peter Brötzmann Tentet.

Bauer died on 6 May 2016 at the age of 61.
