= Joe McPhee =

American jazz musician

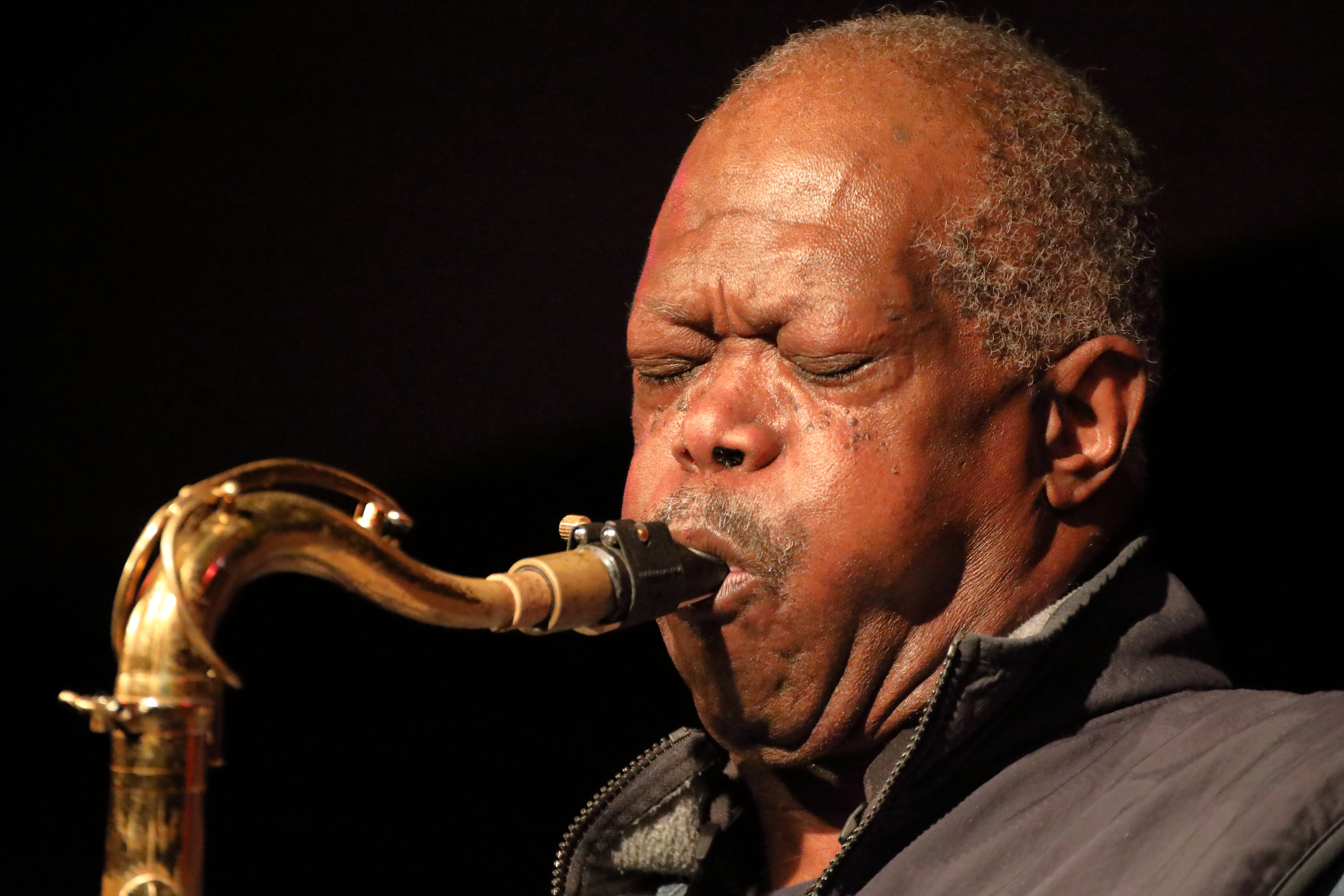
- Joe McPhee in 2019

Background information
- Born: November 3, 1939 (age 87); Miami, Florida, U.S.
- Genre: Jazz
- Occupations: Musician, critic, educator
- Instruments: Saxophone, trumpet, flugelhorn, valve trombone
- Labels: hat Hut, CIMP
- Website: www.joemcphee.com

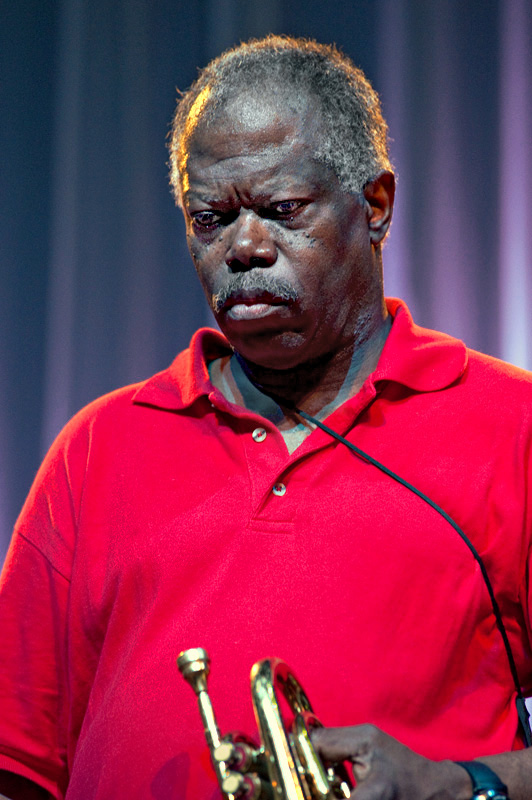
Joe McPhee, Mœrs Festival 2010

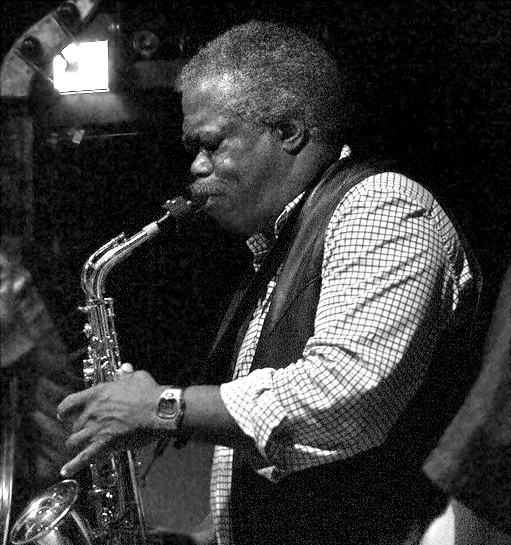
At the Empty Bottle, Chicago, November 4, 2004

Joe McPhee (born November 3, 1939) is an American jazz multi-instrumentalist who plays the tenor, alto, and soprano saxophone, the trumpet, the flugelhorn and the valve trombone. Although born in Miami, Florida, McPhee grew up in Poughkeepsie, New York. He is most notable for his free jazz work done from the late 1960s to the present day.

== Life and career ==
McPhee was born in Miami, Florida, on November 3, 1939. He began playing trumpet when he was eight, before learning other instruments. He played in various high school and then military bands before starting his recording career. His first recording came in 1967, when he appeared on the Clifford Thornton album entitled Freedom and Unity. McPhee taught himself saxophone at the age of 29 after experiencing the music of John Coltrane, Albert Ayler, and Ornette Coleman. During the late 1960s and early 1970s, McPhee lectured on jazz music at Vassar College.

In 1975, Werner Uehlinger started the Swiss label Hathut Records with the specific intent of showcasing McPhee's music. In the 1980s, McPhee met Pauline Oliveros, began studying her musical theories, and worked with her Deep Listening Band. He has not yet signed with any major label in his native United States, and was possibly better known throughout Europe than his native country until the 1990s. His 1996 album As Serious As Your Life, which takes its title from the jazz book by Val Wilmer, is "arguably the finest of his solo recordings", according to the AllMusic review.

Jazz musicians with whom McPhee has recorded or performed include Ken Vandermark, Peter Brötzmann, Evan Parker, Mats Gustafsson, Jeb Bishop, The Thing, Clifton Hyde, Jérôme Bourdellon, Raymond Boni, and Joe Giardullo. Since 1998, McPhee, Dominic Duval, and Jay Rosen have performed and recorded as Trio X. In the 1990s Dominique Eade and McPhee had a jazz ensemble called Naima.

McPhee has written reviews and commentary for Cadence.

In 2005, McPhee was awarded the Resounding Vision Award by Nameless Sound.

In 2015, McPhee played a series of 50th anniversary concerts with Canadian noise pioneers Nihilist Spasm Band in three Canadian cities.

== Discography ==
- Underground Railroad (CjR, 1969)
- Nation Time (CjR, 1971)
- Black Magic Man (HatHut, 1971 [1975])
- At WBAI's Free Music Store, 1971 (HatHut, 1971 [1996])
- Trinity (CjR, 1972) with Harold E. Smith and Mike Kull
- Pieces of Light (CjR, 1974) with John Snyder
- The Willisau Concert (HatHut, 1976) featuring John Snyder and Makaya Ntshoko
- Tenor (HatHut, 1977) – rereleased as Tenor & Fallen Angels in 2000
- Rotation (HatHut, 1976 [1977])
- Graphics (HatHut, 1977 [1978])
- Variations on a Blue Line (HatHut, 1977 [1979])
- Glasses (HatHut, 1977 [1979])
- MFG in Minnesota (HatHut, 1978) with Milo Fine and Steve Gnitka
- Old Eyes (HatHut, 1980) – rereleased as Old Eyes and Mysteries in 1992
- Tales and Prophecies (HatHut, 1981) with André Jaume
- Topology (HatHut, 1981)
- Oleo (Hat Hut, 1982) – rereleased as Oleo & A Future Retrospective in 1993
- Visitation (Sackville, 1985) with the Bill Smith Ensemble
- Songs and Dances (CELP, 1987) with André Jaume and Raymond Boni
- Linear B (Hat Hut, 1990)
- Élan • Impulse (In Situ, 1991) with Daunik Lazro
- Impressions of Jimmy Giuffre (CELP, 1992)
- The October Revolution (Evidence, 1994 [1996]) with Rashied Ali, Borah Bergman, and Wilber Morris
- Sweet Freedom - Now What? (HatArt, 1995) with Lisle Ellis and Paul Plimley
- McPhee/Parker/Lazro (Vand'Oeuvre, 1995 [1996]) with Evan Parker and Daunik Lazro
- Common Threads (Deep Listening, 1995)
- A Meeting in Chicago (Eighth Day Music, 1996 [1997]) with Ken Vandermark and Kent Kessler
- As Serious As Your Life (Hat Hut, 1996)
- Legend Street One (CIMP, 1996)
- Legend Street Two (CIMP, 1996)
- Inside Out (CIMP, 1996) with David Prentice
- Finger Wrigglers (CIMP, 1996) with Michael Bisio
- Specific Gravity (Boxholder, 1997 [2001]) with Joe Giardullo
- The Brass City (Okka Disk, 1997 [1999]) with Jeb Bishop
- Chicago Tenor Duets (Okka Disk, 1998 [2002]) with Evan Parker
- Zebulon (CIMP, 1998 [1999]) with Michael Bisio
- The Dream Book (Cadence Jazz, 1998 [1999]) with Dominic Duval
- Soprano (Roaratorio, 1998 [2007)
- In the Spirit (CIMP, 1999)
- No Greater Love (CIMP, 1999 [2000])
- Emancipation Proclamation: A Real Statement of Freedom (Okka Disk, 1999 [2000]) with Hamid Drake
- Grand Marquis (Boxholder, 1999) with Johnny McLellan
- Manhattan Tango (Label Usine, 2000 [2004]) with Jérôme Bourdellon
- Port of Saints (CjR, 2000 [2005]) with Michael Bisio, Raymond Boni and Dominic Duval
- Voices & Dreams (Emouvance, 2000 [2001]) with Raymond Boni
- Angels, Devils & Haints (CjR, 2000 [2009]) with Michael Bisio, Dominic Duval, Claude Tchamitian and Paul Rogers
- Mister Peabody Goes to Baltimore (Recorded, 2000 [2001])
- Remembrance (CjR, 2001 [2005]) with Michael Bisio, Raymond Boni and Paul Harding
- Tales Out of Time (Hat Hut, 2002 [2004]) with Peter Brötzmann
- A Parallax View (Slam, 2003 [2006]) with Paul Hession
- Between (Ohrai, 2003) with Sato Makoto
- Everything Happens for a Reason (Roaratorio, 2003 [2005])
- In Finland (Cadence Jazz, 2004 [2005]) with Matthew Shipp and Dominic Duval
- Next To You (Emouvance, 2004 [2005]) with Raymond Boni, Daunik Lazro and Claude Tchamitchian
- Guts (Okkadisk, 2005) with Peter Brötzmann, Kent Kessler and Michael Zerang
- The Open Door (CIMPoL, 2006) with Dominic Duval
- Voices: 10 Improvisations (Mode, 2006 [2008]) with John Heward
- Red Morocco (2006)
- Tomorrow Came Today (Smalltown Superjazz, 2007) with Paal Nilssen-Love
- Two Bands and a Legend (Smalltown Superjazz, 2007), with Cato Salsa Experience and The Thing
- Alto (Roaratorio, 2009)
- Magic (Not Two, 2009) with Mikołaj Trzaska, Dominic Duval and Jay Rosen
- The Damage Is Done (Not Two, 2009) with Peter Brötzmann, Kent Kessler and Michael Zerang
- Blue Chicago Blues (Not Two, 2010) with Ingebrigt Håker Flaten
- Creole Gardens (A New Orleans Suite) (NoBusiness, 2011) with Michael Zerang
- Brooklyn DNA (Clean Feed, 2012) with Ingebrigt Håker Flaten
- What/If/They Both Could Fly (Rune Grammofon, 2012) with Evan Parker
- Ithaca (8mm Records, 2012) with Eli Keszler
- Red Sky (PNL, 2013) with Paal Nilssen-Love
- Sonic Elements (Clean Feed, 2013)
- Tree Dancing (Otoroku, 2019) with Chris Corsano, Lol Coxhill and Evan Parker
- Echoes (Rune Grammofon, 2023) with Fire! Orchestra
- I'm Just Say'n (Smalltown Supersound / Le Jazz Non, 2025)

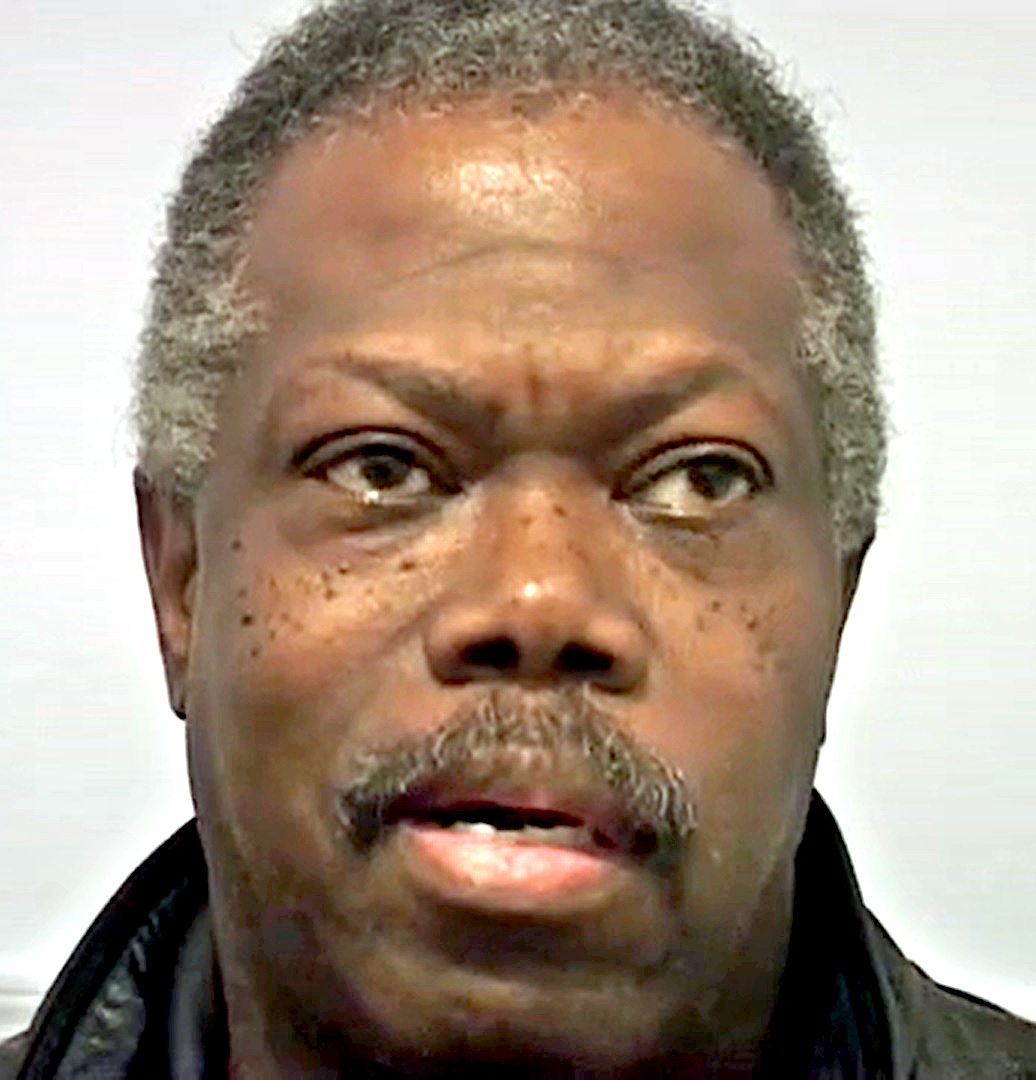
Joe McPhee circa 2004

=== With Trio X ===
- Rapture (Cadence Jazz, 1999)
- The Watermelon Suite (CIMP, 1999)
- On Tour (Cadence Jazz, 2001)
- In Black and White (Cadence Jazz, 2002)
- Journey (CIMP, 2003)
- The Sugar Hill Suite (CIMP, 2004)
- Moods: Playing with the Elements (CIMP, 2005)
- Roulette at Location One (Cadence Jazz, 2005)
- Air: Above and Beyond (CIMPol, 2006)
- 2006 U.S. Tour (CIMPol, 2007)
- Live in Vilnius (NoBusiness, 2008)
- Live On Tour 2008 (CIMPol, 2010)
- Live On Tour 2010 (CIMPol, 2012)

== With Survival Unit III ==
- Don’t Postpone Joy! (Rai Trade, 2006)
- Syncronicity] (Harmonic Convergence, 2011)
- Game Theory (Not Two Records, 2013)
- Barrow Street Blues (Holidays Records, 2015)
- Straylight (Pink Palace, 2015)
- Straylight (Live at Jazzhouse Copenhagen) (Astral Spirits, Monofonus Records, 2015)

=== Compilations ===
- A Future Retospective (Hat Hut, 1983) – compiles Old Eyes and Oleo
- Nation Time: The Complete Recordings (1969-70) (Corbett vs Dempsy, 2013) – Compiles Nation Times and Black Magic Man with 2 CDs of unreleased live recordings
- The CjR Years (Bo'Weevil, 2014) – 4LP Box Set compiles Underground Railroad, Nation Time, Trinity and Pieces of Light

=== As sideman ===
With Peter Brötzmann

- The Chicago Octet/Tentet (Okka Disc, 1998)
- American Landscapes 1 (Okka Disc, 2007)
- American Landscapes 2 (Okka Disc, 2007)
- 3 Nights in Oslo (Smalltown Superjazzz, 2010)

With Roy Campbell, William Parker & Warren Smith

- Tribute to Albert Ayler Live at the Dynamo (Marge Records, 2009)

With the C. T. String Quartet

- Reqiphoenix Nexus (Cadence Jazz, 1999 [2006])

With Dominic Duval

- Live in Concert (Cadence Jazz, 1999)
- Cries and Whispers (Cadence Jazz, 1999 [2001])
- Undersound (Leo, 2000)
- Undersound II (Leo, 2003)
- Rules Of Engagement, Vol. 2 (Drimala, 2004)

With Joe Fonda

- Heat Suite (Konnex, 2003)

With Joe Giardullo

- Shadow & Light (Drimala, 2002)

With Jimmy Giuffre and André Jaume

- River Station (CELP, 1993)

With Raphe Malik

- Sympathy (Boxholder, 2002) with Donald Robinson

With Mat Maneri

- Sustain (Thirsty Ear, 2002)

With the Nihilist Spasm Band

- No Borders (Non Musica Rex, 2001)

With Evan Parker

- The Redwood Session (CIMP, 1995)

With Jamie Saft

- Ticonderoga (Clean Feed, 2015)

With Clifford Thornton

- Freedom & Unity (Third World Records, 1967)

With The Thing

- She Knows... (Crazy Wisdom, 2001)
