= Mats Gustafsson =

Swedish free jazz saxophone player (born 1964)

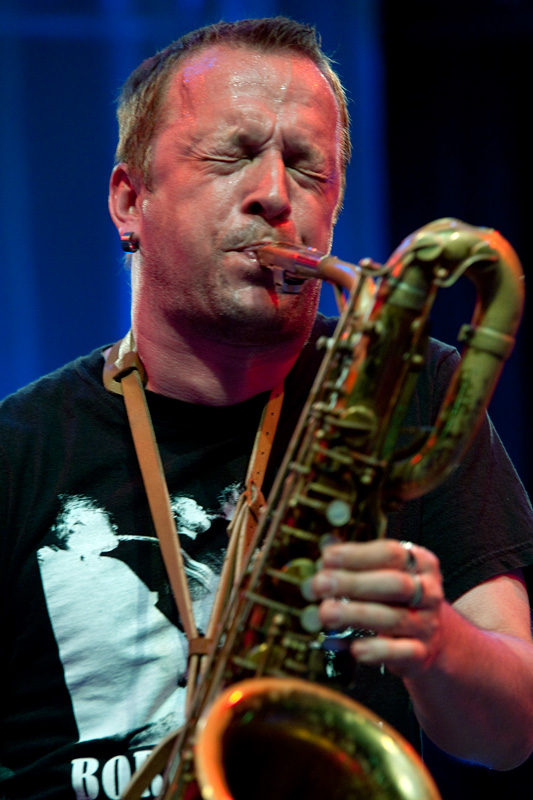
- Mats Gustafsson in concert, 2010

Background information
- Born: Mats Olof Gustafsson; 29 October 1964 (age 61); Umeå, Sweden
- Genres: Jazz, free jazz
- Occupation: Musician
- Instruments: Saxophone, fluteophone, flute, clarinet
- Years active: 1986–present
- Labels: Rune Grammofon, Smalltown Supersound
- Website: matsgus.com

Mats Olof Gustafsson (born 29 October 1964) is a Swedish free jazz saxophone player.

== Early life and career ==
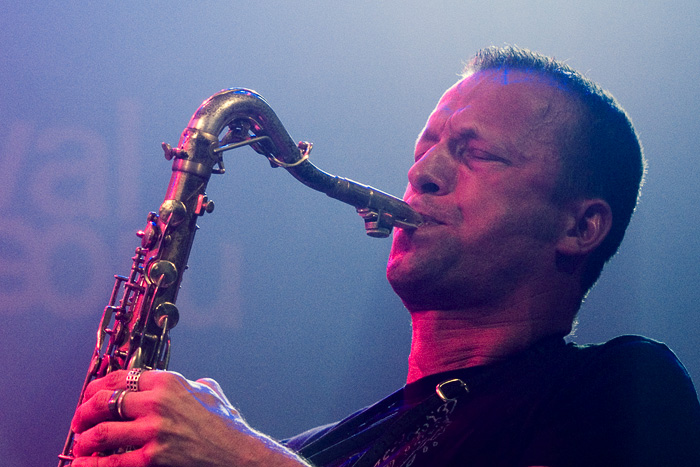
Mats Gustafsson at Moers Festivalin Germany in June 2006

Mats Gustafsson at "Sonore" concert, Lviv, 14 Dec 2008

Born in 1964 in Umeå, Gustafsson's first instrument was the flute. By his early teens, he had begun playing the saxophone.

Gustafsson first came to the attention of lovers of improvised music in 1986 with the formation of the AALY Trio. Alongside drummer Kjell Nordeson, early versions of the group included bassist Niklas Billström; Peter Janson joined on bass in 1995 and, in 1996, the group expanded with saxophonist Ken Vandermark as a regular guest member. The group released its first full-length album, Hidden in the Stomach, on the Silkheart label in 1998.

Around this time, Gustafsson also played as part of a duo with Christian Munthe (started in 1986), a member of Gunter Christmann's Vario project, and in the band Gush (started in 1988). He later played widely with Peter Brötzmann, Joe McPhee, Paul Lovens, Barry Guy, Yoshimi P-We, Derek Bailey, Magnus Broo, Otomo Yoshihide, Pat Thomas, Jim O'Rourke, Thomas Lehn, Evan Parker, Misha Mengelberg, Oren Ambarchi, Zu, The Ex and Sonic Youth.

In 2000 Gustafsson formed the Swedish-Norwegian free-jazz trio The Thing with bassist Ingebrigt Håker Flaten and drummer Paal Nilssen-Love. The group became one of his most prominent projects, combining original compositions with repertoire drawn from free jazz artists such as Don Cherry and Ornette Coleman and rock artists including The White Stripes and Richard Berry.

In 2009, he formed the trio Fire! with bassist Johan Berthling and drummer Andreas Werliin. The group later expanded into the large-ensemble Fire! Orchestra, which brings together numerous Scandinavian improvisers and has performed at major international jazz festivals.

Since the early 1990s Gustafsson has been a regular visitor to the United States, forming a particular affinity with Chicago musicians Hamid Drake, Michael Zerang, and Ken Vandermark and recording for Okka Disk. He has lived in Nickelsdorf, Austria since 2011. The same year, he was awarded the 2011 Nordic Council Music Prize.

== Festival curator ==
Gustafsson curated the Perspectives festivals in Västerås, Sweden in 2004, 2007 and 2009. This festival of musical improvisation is noted for its cross-genre character and creative atmosphere among musicians. The festival slogan for 2004 was "Fight Global Stupidity", 2007 "Fight Local Stupidity" and for 2009 it became "Fight (y)our stupidity".

Gustafsson was also joint curator of the 2010 Konfrontationen festival in Nickelsdorf, Austria.

== Gallery ==
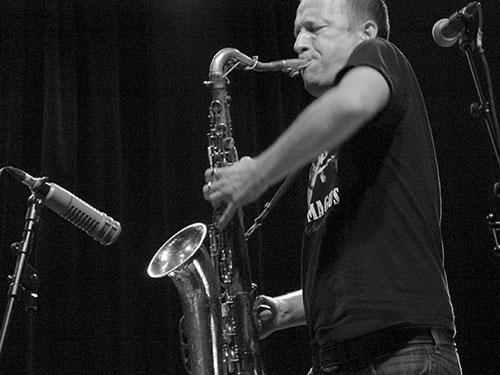

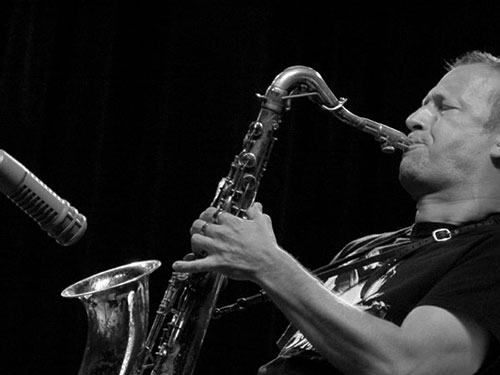

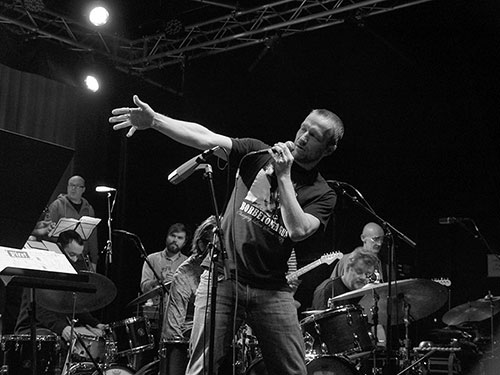

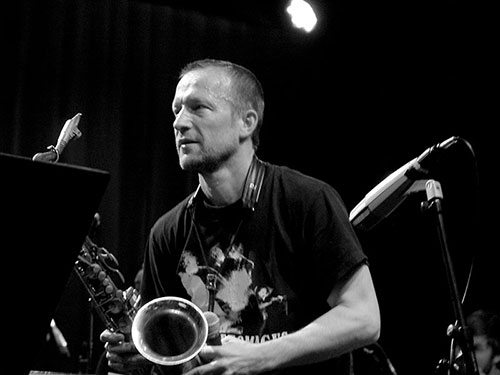

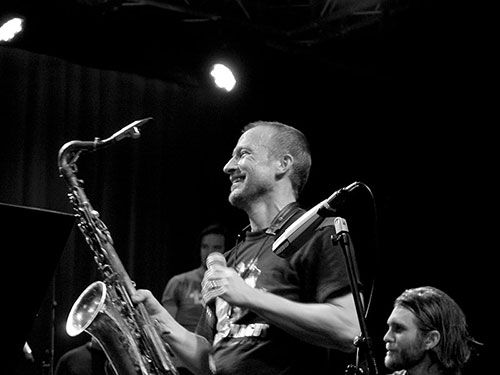

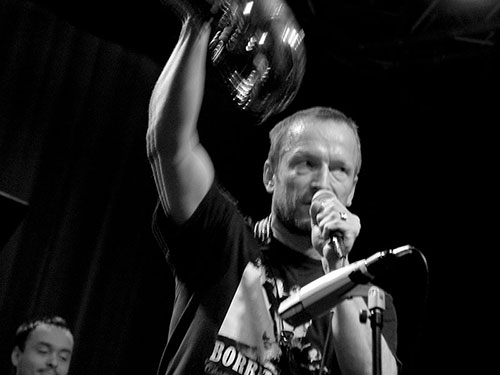

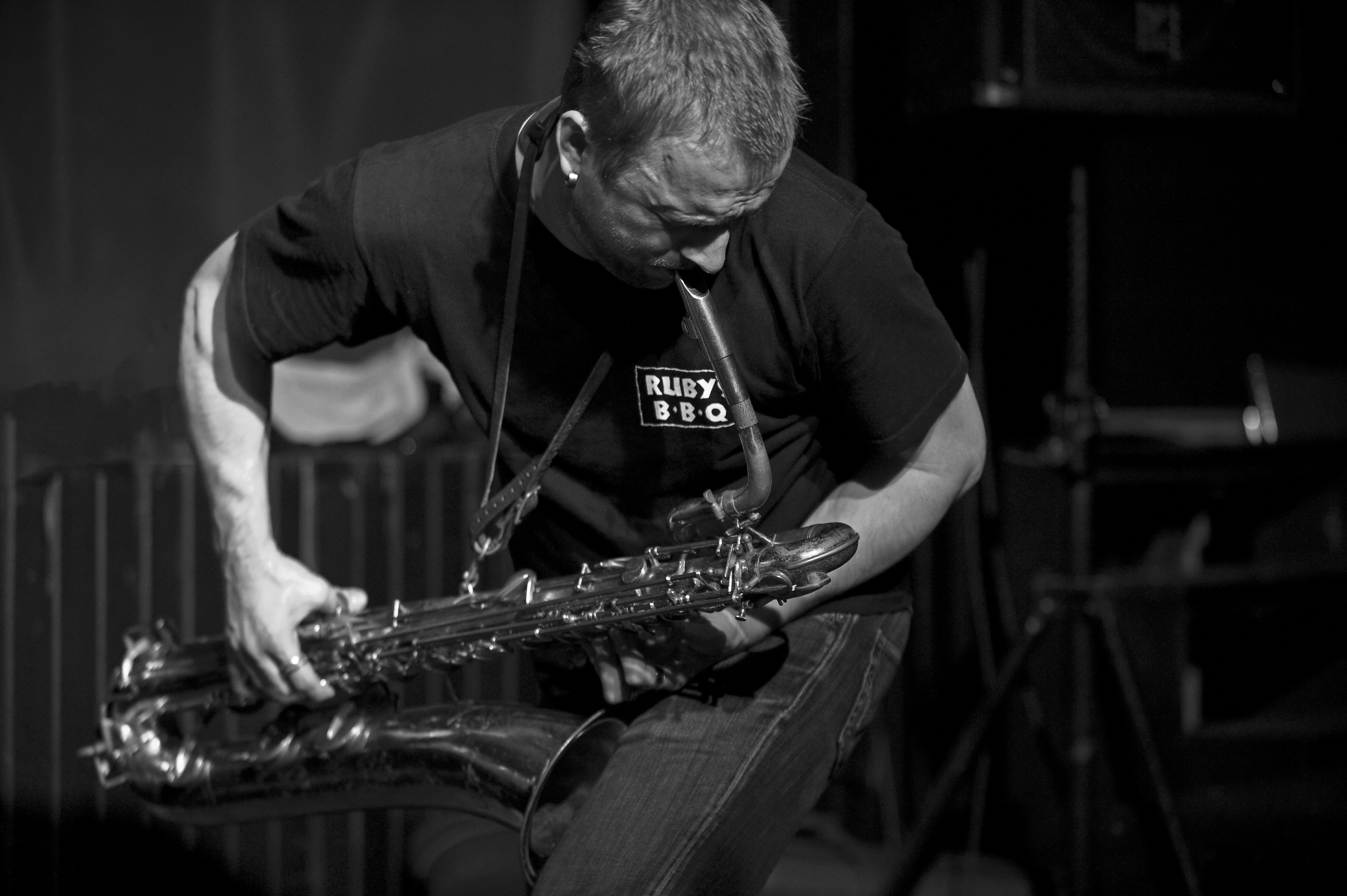
Mats Olof Gustafsson Toronto, Canada

== Discography ==
=== As leader ===
- 1991: Nothing to Read (Blue Tower), with Paul Lovens
- 1995: Parrot Fish Eye (Okka Disk)
- 1995: For Don Cherry (Blue Tower), with Hamid Drake
- 1996: Mouth Eating Trees and Related Activities (Okka Disk), with Barry Guy & Paul Lovens
- 1997: Frogging (Maya), with Barry Guy
- 1997: Impropositions (Phono Suecia)
- 1999: The Education of Lars Jerry (Xeric)
- 1999: Windows _The Music of Steve Lacy (Blue Chopsticks)
- 1999: Hidros One (Caprice), with Nu-Ensemblen
- 2000: Port Huron Picnic (Spool), with Kurt Newman & Mike Gennaro
- 2002: The School Days and Thing (Anagram), the music of Norman Howard presented by Mats Gustafsson
- 2003: Blues (Atavistic), with David Stackenäs
- 2004: Hidros 3 (Smalltown Supersound), Sonic Youth With Friends
- 2005: Slide (Firework Edition)
- 2005: Catapult (Doubtmusic)
- 2007: It Is All About... (Tyfus)
- 2007: Words on the Floor (Smalltown Superjazzz), with Yoshimi P-We
- 2008: Mats G Plays Duke E (Qbico)
- 2008: Cosmic Debris Volume IV (Opax), with My Cat Is An Alien
- 2008: The Vilnius Implosion (NoBusiness)
- 2008: Mats G Plays Duke E (Qbico)
- 2009: Mats G. Plays Albert A. (Qbico)
- 2009 You Liked Me Five Minutes Ago (Rune Grammofon) with Fire!
- 2011 Released (Rune Grammofon) with Fire! & Jim O'Rourke
- 2011 Uneleased (Rune Grammofon) with Fire! & Jim O'Rourke
- 2012 In the Mouth a Hand (Rune Grammofon) w with Fire! & Oren Ambarchi
- 2012: Baro 101 (Terp ), with Paal Nilssen-Love & Mesele Asmamaw
- 2012: Mats G. Plays Gullin (Sagittarius A-Star)
- 2012: Birds (dEN ), with John Russell & Raymond Strid
- 2012: Bengt (Utech)
- 2013 Without Noticing (Rune Grammofon) with Fire!
- 2013: Eissalon (Live) (Rock Is Hell ), with Didi Kern
- 2013: Vi Är Alla Guds Slavar (Otoroku), with Thurston Moore
- 2014: Hidros6 Knockin' (Not Two), with NU Ensemble
- 2014 Enter (Rune Grammofon) with Fire! Orchestra
- 2015 Exit (Rune Grammofon) with Fire! Orchestra
- 2015 Second Exit (Rune Grammofon) with Fire! Orchestra
- 2015: Hit The Wall! (Smalltown Superjazzz), with Thurston Moore
- 2016 MG 50_Peace & Fire (Rune Grammofon) & Friends
- 2016 She Sleeps She Sleeps (Rune Grammofon) with Fire!
- 2016: Piano Mating (Blue Tapes and X-Ray)
- 2016 Ritual (Rune Grammofon) with Fire! Orchestra
- 2018 The Hands (Rune Grammofon) with Fire!
- 2019 Arrival (Rune Grammofon) with Fire! Orchestra
- 2020 Actions (Rune Grammofon) with Fire! Orchestra
- 2021 Defeat (Rune Grammofon) with Fire!

With AALY Trio + Ken Vandermark

- 1998: Hidden in the Stomach (Silkheart)
- 1998: Stumble (Wobbly Rail)
- 1999: Live at the Glenn Miller Café (Wobbly Rail)
- 2000: I Wonder If I Was Screaming (Crazy Wisdom)
- 2002: Double or Nothing (Okka Disc) AALY Trio / DKV Trio
- 2024: Sustain (Silkheart)

=== As sideman ===
With Per Henrik Wallin & Kjell Nordeson

- 1995: Dolphins, Dolphins, Dolphins (Dragon)

With Jaap Blonk & Michael Zerang

- 1996: Improvisors (Kontrans)

With Ken Vandermark

- 1997: FJF: Blow Horn (Okka Disk)
- 2013: Verses (Corbett vs. Dempsey)

With Jim O'Rourke

- 1999: Xylophonen Virtuosen (Incus)

With David Grubbs

- 1999: Apertura (Blue Chopsticks)
- 2002: Off-Road (Blue Chopsticks)

With Thurston Moore, Lee Ranaldo & Steve Shelley

- 2000: New York – Ystad (Olof Bright)

With Greg Goodman & George Cremaschi

- 2002: They Were Gentle and Pretty Pigs (The Beak Doctor)

With Agustí Fernández

- 2005: Critical Mass (psi)

With Paal Nilssen-Love

- 2005: Splatter (Smalltown Superjazzz)

With Sonic Youth & Merzbow

- 2008: Andre Sider Af Sonic Youth (Sonic Youth)

With Pat Thomas and Roger Turner (The Articles)

- 2008: Goodbye Silence

With Barry Guy Solo/Duo

- 2009: Sinners, Rather than Saints (NoBusiness)

With Barry Guy and the London Jazz Composers' Orchestra with Irène Schweizer

- 2009: Radio Rondo/Schaffhausen Concert (Intakt)

With the Barry Guy New Orchestra

- 2001: Inscape–Tableaux (Intakt)
- 2005: Oort–Entropy (Intakt)

With Barry Guy and Raymond Strid

- 1996: You Forget to Answer (Maya)
- 1997: Gryffgryffgryffs: The 1996 Radio Sweden Concert (Music & Arts)

With Gord Grdina Trio

- 2010: Barrel Fire (Drip Audio)

With Kieran Hebden & Steve Reid

- 2011: Live at the South Bank (Smalltown Superjazzz)

With The Sons of God

- 2011: Reception (Firework Edition)

With Masami Akita & Jim O'Rourke

- 2011: One Bird Two Bird (Editions Mego)

With Colin Stetson

- 2012: Stones (Rune Grammofon)

With Ich Bin N!ntendo including Christian Skår Winther, Joakim Heibø Johansen & Magnus Skavhaug Nergaard

- 2012: Ich Bin N!ntendo & Mats Gustafsson (Va Fongool)

With The Ex

- 2013 Enormous Door (Ex Records)

With Agustí Fernández & Ramon Prats

- 2013: Breakin the Lab! (Discordian)

With Correction

- 2013: Shift (Otoroku)

With Merzbow & Balázs Pándi

- 2013: Cuts (RareNoise)
- 2015: Live in Tabačka 13/04/12 (Tabačka)
- 2020: Cuts Open (RareNoise)

With Merzbow, Balázs Pándi & Thurston Moore

- 2015: Cuts of Guilt, Cuts Deeper (RareNoise)

With Craig Taborn

- 2015: Ljubljana (Clean Feed)

With Paul Rutherford

- 2002: Chicago 2002 (Emanem)

With the Peter Brötzmann Chicago Octet/Tentet

- 1998: The Chicago Octet/Tentet (Okka Disc)
- 2000: Stone/Water (Okka Disc)
- 2007: American Landscapes 1 (Okka Disc)
- 2007: American Landscapes 2 (Okka Disc)
- 2010: 3 Nights in Oslo (Smalltown Superjazz)

== Bibliography ==
- T. Millroth: "Aaly Trio", Orkester journalen, lvi/4 (1988), 11 .
- M. Chaloin: "Mats Gustafsson", Improjazz, no.19 (1995), 6.
- W. Montgomery: "Mats Gustafsson: Flow Motion", Wire, no.164 (1997), 18.
- J. Hale: "Mats Gustafsson", Coda, no.288 (1999), 17.
