= Ken Vandermark =

American composer and musician

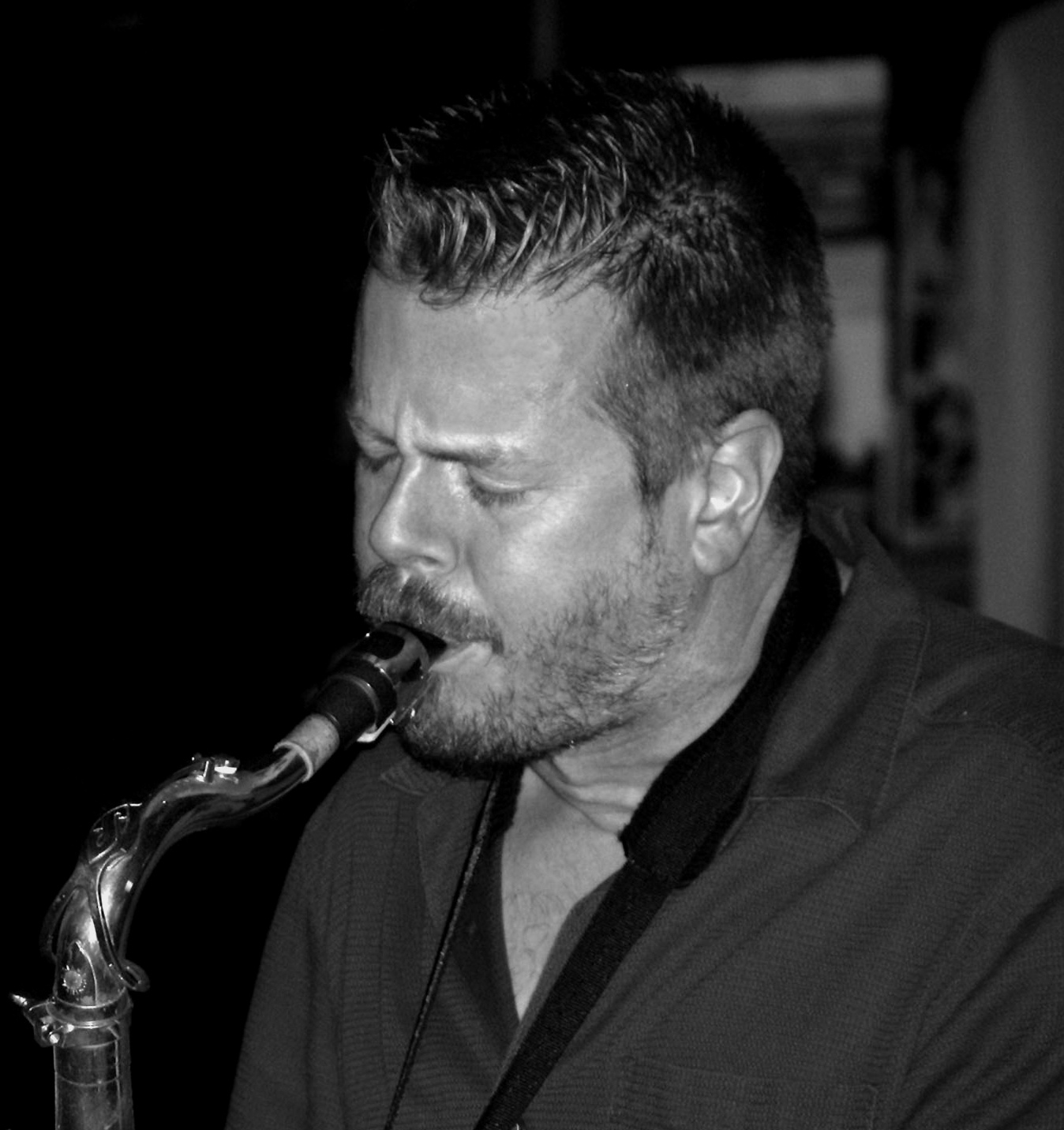
- Empty Bottle, Chicago, September 22–26, 2004; photo courtesy Seth Tisue

Background information
- Born: September 22, 1964 (age 61); Warwick, Rhode Island, U.S.
- Genres: Avant-garde jazz, free jazz, free improvisation
- Occupation: Musician
- Instruments: Saxophone, clarinet
- Labels: Spool, Atavistic
- Formerly of: NRG Ensemble; The Flying Luttenbachers; DKV Trio; Vandermark 5
- Website: www.kenvandermark.com

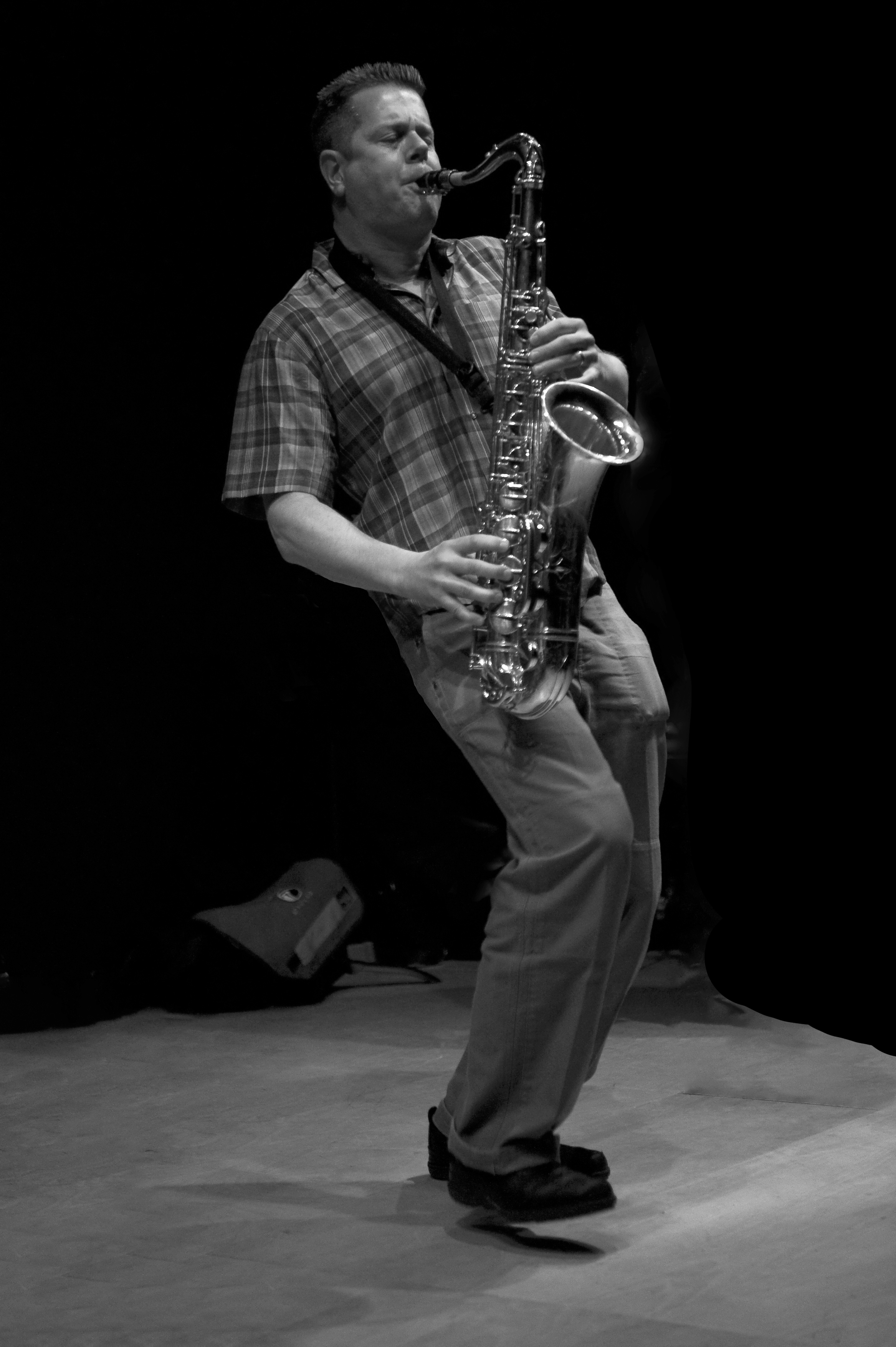
Ken Vandermark, Buffalo New York

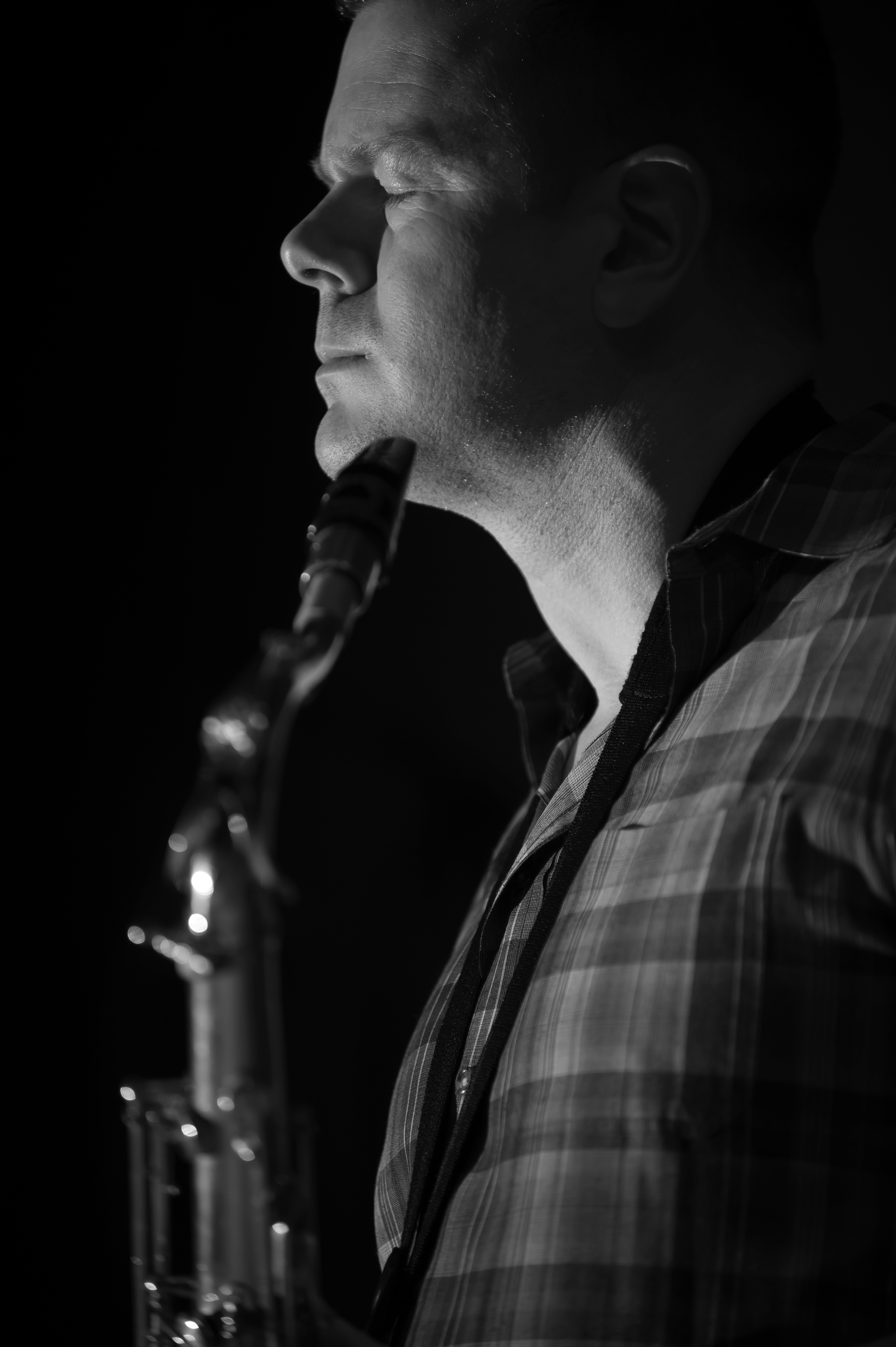
Ken Vandermark

Ken Vandermark (born September 22, 1964) is an American composer and reedist.

A fixture on the Chicago-area music scene since the 1990s, Vandermark has earned wide critical praise for his playing and his multilayered compositions, which typically balance intricate orchestration with passionate improvisation. He has led or been a member of many groups, has collaborated with many other musicians, and was awarded a 1999 MacArthur Fellowship. He plays tenor saxophone, clarinet, bass clarinet, and baritone saxophone.

He was also a member of NRG Ensemble.

== Biography ==
=== Boston and Montreal ===
At "Sonore" concert, Lviv, Dec 14, 2008

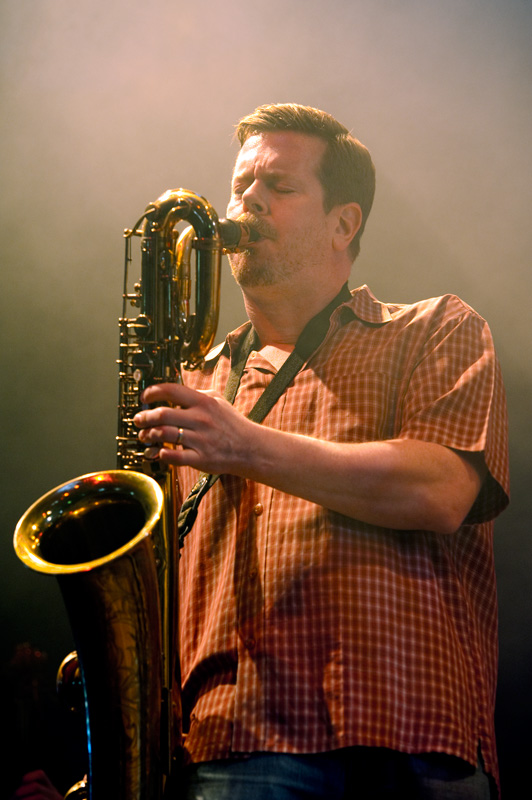
Ken Vandermark, mœrs festival, 2010

Vandermark grew up in Massachusetts, graduating from Natick High School. His father, Stu Vandermark, was the Boston correspondent for Cadence Magazine and currently is a noted essayist on jazz, primarily concerned with improvisation.

Vandermark led a jazz trio, the Fourth Stream, in Montreal while he was an undergraduate at McGill University. After meeting Michael Snow at a gig, not recognizing the filmmaker as a trumpter, Vandermark would record a duo record with Snow (Duol!) in 2012. He graduated in 1986 with a degree in English but focusing on cinema. After graduation, he led or co-led groups (including Lombard Street and Mr. Furious) in Boston.

Compositions/arrangements for the Boston-based groups set the groundwork for and predicted approaches to recordings and live performances developed in Chicago. Although a trio, Lombard Street incorporated "suite forms" characteristic of later arrangements for groups of both substantial and limited instrumentation. Vandermark's "dedication pieces" are found first in Lombard Street performances, as in the case of "The Politics of Sound," which was dedicated to the musicians in Boston-based ensembles Shock Exchange, The Fringe, and the Joe Morris Trio. Works performed by Mr. Furious, such as "Cold Coffee", include some of the most convincing early examples of Vandermark's signature free-ranging charts. Developed further in Barrage Double Trio (e.g., "Agamemnon Sleeps") this simultaneously linear and episodic perspective on arrangement broadly has been the overarching architecture in most of his works for large-ensembles since that time.

=== Chicago ===
Vandermark has lived in Chicago since autumn 1989. Since then, he has performed or recorded with many musicians (including Hal Russell, Paal Nilssen-Love, Hamid Drake, Fred Anderson, David Stackenäs, Paul Lytton, Joe Morris, Ab Baars, The Ex, Mikolaj Trzaska, Marcin Oles, Waclaw Zimpel, Axel Doerner, Mats Gustafsson, Bartlomiej Oles, Wolter Wierbos, Joe McPhee, Zu, Peter Brötzmann, Fredrik Ljungkvist, Paul Lovens, Lasse Marhaug, Yakuza, Kevin Drumm, and members of Superchunk). He first gained widespread attention while with the NRG Ensemble from 1992 to 1996. He was once a member of Witches and Devils and the Flying Luttenbachers and has led or co-led several groups, including DKV Trio, Free Fall, Territory Band, CINC, Sonore, the Vandermark 5, the Free Music Ensemble, School Days, the Sound in Action Trio, Steam and Powerhouse Sound.

The Joe Harriott Project, a brief celebration of Harriott in 1998 in the Chicago area, consisted of Ken Vandermark (reeds), Jeb Bishop (trombone), Kent Kessler (bass), and Tim Mulvenna (drums). The band played the music of Joe Harriott, transcribed and arranged by Vandermark.

In 2002 Vandermark recorded Furniture Music, his first released performances as an unaccompanied soloist.

After several years of Vandermark 5 performances of his arrangements of works by Sonny Rollins, Joe McPhee, Cecil Taylor, and others, Vandermark in 2005 announced, "Though I have learned a great deal by rearranging some of my favorite composers' work for the Vandermark 5, it's time to leave that process behind and focus more completely on my own ideas."

Vandermark is the subject of Musician (2007), one of a series of Daniel Kraus video documentaries on contemporary occupations.

== Awards ==
Vandermark won the Cadence magazine poll in 1998 for best artist and best recording. He was a finalist for the 1998 Herb Alpert Fellowship.

In 1999 Vandermark was awarded a $265,000 MacArthur Fellowship, a prize then awarded on an age-based scale to creative leaders and meant to enable them to pursue their creative, intellectual, and professional inclinations. The fellowship was controversial, due to Vandermark's relative youth and obscurity: he was 35 and known mostly in Chicago, while other jazz performers awarded the fellowship were older and better-known (e.g., Cecil Taylor, George Russell).

== Groups and collaborations ==
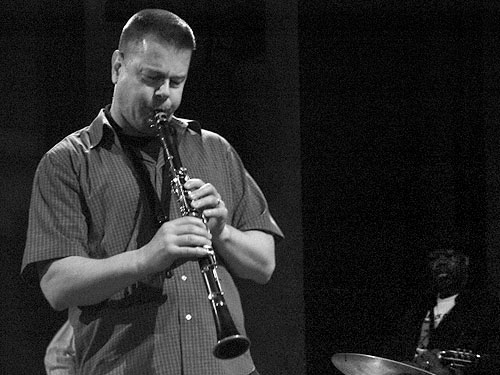
Ken Vandermark

In the mid-1990s, Vandermark was known, in part, for his many collaborations with other musicians. Some groups were ad hoc settings, while others were more stable. He worked not only in jazz, but free improvisation, noise, rock and roll of various stripes, and other settings. Due in part to wanting to focus more on his own compositions, Vandermark decided in about 2000 to limit his collaborations.

Vandermark is one of the founders and members of Catalytic Sound, an organization dedicated to the economic sustainability of creative musicians that developed its own publishing outlet in 2023.

=== DKV Trio ===
Composed of drummer Hamid Drake, bassist Kent Kessler, and Vandermark. The group plays intermittently, except for two end-of-the-year concerts at Elastic Arts every December. In 2017, DKV played two tours, one with Joe McPhee, and in 2020 there was no end-of-year concert, due to the COVID-19 pandemic.

=== Spaceways Inc. ===
Vandermark, Drake, and bassist Nate McBride are in this band. Originally devoted to interpretations of the music of Sun Ra and the P-Funk/George Clinton family, Spaceways Inc. later branched into versions of classic reggae songs as well as Vandermark originals.

=== The Vandermark 5 ===
Perhaps Vandermark's main compositional vehicle, The Vandermark 5 released their first album in 1997. Initial personnel were Vandermark, Mars Williams (saxophone), Jeb Bishop (trombone and electric guitar, though the latter was gradually phased out), Kessler (bass) and Tim Mulvenna (drums). Williams left and was replaced by saxophonist Dave Rempis; while Tim Daisy took over Mulvenna's seat at the drums. Bishop left the group in 2005, and was replaced with cellist Fred Lonberg-Holm.

Their music could be broadly classified as post bop, though their earlier era had strong leanings towards punk rock and noise due to Bishop's ragged guitar contributions. In 2010 Vandermark announced the disbanding of the ensemble, although he continues to work with band members in other contexts (e.g., with Kessler in DKV).

=== Free Fall Trio ===
Active c. 2004–2007, the Free Fall Trio included Vandermark and two Norwegian musicians: pianist Håvard Wiik and bassist Ingebrigt Håker-Flaten. This group was loosely inspired by Jimmy Giuffre's groundbreaking early 1960s trio, which featured the same instrumentation. Like Giuffre, Vandermark played clarinet and emphasized a rather hushed and subdued chamber jazz that still managed to swing and take creative leaps.

=== Territory Band ===
After being awarded the MacArthur Fellowship in 1999, Vandermark used some of the financial windfall to assemble the Territory Band, a big band composed of musicians from North America and Europe. Vandermark describes Territory Band as "an intersection of my two primary musical interests, American Jazz and European Improvised Music." Personnel has varied but has always included Vandermark, Rempis and Fredrik Ljungkvist on reeds; Axel Dörner on trumpet and Per-Åke Holmlander on tuba; Jim Baker on piano; Kessler on bass and Lonberg-Holm on cello; and Paal Nilssen-Love and Paul Lytton on drums. Territory Band also incorporates elements of noise and electroacoustic improvisation via the contributions of Kevin Drumm, who departed in about 2005 and was replaced by Lasse Marhaug.

=== RARA AVIS ===
In June 2012, Vandermark recorded Mutations/Multicellulars Mutations, the first album by a newly created ensemble called RARA AVIS, featuring Stefano Ferrian (soprano/tenor saxophone), Stefano Quatrana (piano), Luca Pissavini (double bass) and SEC_ (tape recorder, instant sound treatment). The ensemble premiered on April 26, 2013 at Novara Jazz Winter.

=== Marker ===
Vandermark named his group Marker for filmmaker Chris Marker. In addition to Vandermark, the group features the younger musicians Macie Stewart (violin, keyboard), Steve Marquette (guitar), Andrew Clinkman (guitar), and Phil Sudderberg (drums). Marker's album Wired for Sound was recorded in 2017 and released in 2018, and a second live album was recorded and released in 2018. Marker toured in 2018. (From 2017-2020, Vandermark and Stewart, often along with Anton Hatwich, Isaiah Spencer, Sima Cunningham, and Liam Kazar (Cunningham), usually participated in the annual winter performances in Chicago of the Yes We Can Band led by Jeff Albert and Steve Marquette, which covers New Orleans rhythm & blues/funk tunes, especially those of Allen Toussaint and the Meters.)

=== Edition Redux ===
Edition Redux formed in Chicago in early 2023, featuring, in addition to Vandermark, the much younger musicians (Erez Dessel (keyboards), Lily Finnegan (drums), and Beth McDonald (tuba, electronics). Edition Redux's album Better a Rook Than a Pawn, based on compositions by Vandermark, was released in late 2023. Their second album, Broadcast Transformer, a collaboration with poet John Yao came out in 2025.

=== Edition XL ===
An expanded version of Edition Redux, adding in Josh Berman on cornet and Nick Macri on bass, launched in July 2025 at the Jazz Estate in Milwaukee followed by two nights of performances at Green Mill a week later.
