= Consequences (New York Contemporary Five album) =

Studio album by New York Contemporary Five
- Released: 1966
- Recorded: August 23 & October 12, 1963
- Genre: Jazz
- Length: 45:55
- Label: Fontana

Archie Shepp chronology
Rufus (1963)	Consequences (1966)	New York Contemporary Five (1963)

Don Cherry chronology
Evidence (1961)	Consequences (1963)	New York Contemporary Five (1963)

Consequences is the debut album by the New York Contemporary Five featuring saxophonists Archie Shepp and John Tchicai, trumpeter Don Cherry, bassist Don Moore and drummer J. C. Moses. The album was released on the Fontana label in 1966. In 2020, the Ezz-thetics label re-released the material from Consequences, along with the three NYCF tracks from the B side of Bill Dixon 7-tette/Archie Shepp and the New York Contemporary 5, on a remastered compilation CD titled Consequences Revisited.

== Reception ==
In a review of the 2020 re-release, Mark Corroto wrote: "The music is the quintessential time capsule of the era, pulling together the revolutions of Dixon, Coleman, Mingus, Rollins, and Monk and anticipating the coming of Albert Ayler and Pharoah Sanders... The music is a stepping-off point from bebop into free music." A reviewer for Rough Trade wrote: "Their scorching music — aided by the supple and hard-hitting rhythm section of Don Moore and J. C. Moses — is a thrilling mix of adventurous soloing and post-bop structures, memorable heads and go-for-broke improv... What's still remarkable about these tunes is their sense of internal tension. They're wound tighter than a magnet coil, without sacrificing any spontaneity. There's little that's strictly free about this jazz, but it's full of reckless and unexpected drama all the same."

== Track listing ==
1. "Sound Barrier" (Don Cherry) - 8:25
2. "Wo Wo" (John Tchicai) - 8:48
3. "Consequences" (Don Cherry) - 7:40
4. "Rufus" (Archie Shepp) - 9:25
5. "Crepuscule with Nellie" (Thelonious Monk) - 2:20
6. "Trio" (Bill Dixon) - 8:55

Recorded in New York City on August 23, 1963 except "Trio" recorded in Copenhagen, Denmark on October 12, 1963.

== Personnel ==
- Archie Shepp: tenor saxophone
- John Tchicai: alto saxophone
- Don Cherry: trumpet
- Don Moore: bass
- J. C. Moses: drums
