= Rufus (jazz album) =

Studio album by John Tchicai & Archie Shepp
- Released: 1963
- Recorded: August 23, 1963
- Genre: Jazz
- Label: Fontana

Archie Shepp chronology
Archie Shepp - Bill Dixon Quartet (1963)	Rufus (1963)	Consequences (1963)

John Tchicai chronology
Rufus (1963)	Consequences (1963)

Rufus is an album featuring saxophonists Archie Shepp and John Tchicai, bassist Don Moore and drummer J. C. Moses. The album was released on the Fontana label in 1963. This group with the addition of trumpeter Don Cherry became known as the New York Contemporary Five and released Consequences for which this album appears to have been a "pilot".

== Track listing ==
1. "Rufus" (Archie Shepp) - 11:18
2. "Nettus" (John Tchicai) - 12:36
3. "Hoppin'" (Tchicai) - 7:10
4. "For Helved" (Tchicai) - 12:16
5. "Funeral" (Shepp) - 5:05

Recorded in New York City on August 23, 1963.

== Personnel ==
- Archie Shepp: tenor saxophone
- John Tchicai: alto saxophone
- Don Moore: bass
- J. C. Moses: drums
