= Who's Crazy? (film) =

1965 film directed by Thomas White

- Directed by: Thomas White
- Produced by: Thomas White & Allan Lion
- Cinematography: Bernard Daillencourt
- Edited by: Denise de Casabianca
- Music by: Ornette Coleman; David Izenzon, bassist; Charles Moffett, drummer
- Release dates: August 1965 (Switzerland); 1966 (France)

Who's Crazy? is a 1965 film directed by Thomas White starring actors from the Living Theatre troupe while they were living in Paris. The film focuses on a group of inmates in a mental institution who escape when their bus breaks down and begin to live in a rural farmhouse. The film was an American independent production shot in Belgium.

The movie premiered at the Locarno Film Festival in 1965. It was then re-edited with a score from free-jazz pioneer, Ornette Coleman and his trio. This version was screened at Cannes Film Festival in 1966.

== Plot ==
The film centers around a group inmates in a mental institution who escape when their bus breaks down and begin to live in a farmhouse in rural Belgium.

== Production ==
The movie came about as director Thomas White became aquatinted with the Living Theatre troupe actors in Europe who sought to fill their time while waiting for founders Judith Malina and Julian Beck to return from America. The film was shot over the course of 10 or 12 days in Belgium, and 10 hours of raw footage was captured. The scenarios were all improvised by the Living Theatre actors with director Thomas White saying, "Nobody told them what to do."

The movie premiered at the Locarno Film Festival in 1965 with a poor reception leading White to re-edit it and add a soundtrack. White, who lived in Paris, had many artistic friends and acquaintances and he recruited singer-songwriter Nino Ferrer, guitarist Ramon Ybarra, and British folk singer Marianne Faithfull. Most importantly, White convinced influential jazz musician Ornette Coleman, who was touring Europe, to record the soundtrack.

== Soundtrack ==
The soundtrack became a well regarded and sought out piece of jazz independently of the film after Thomas White sold the rights to the soundtrack separately from the film. The album Who's Crazy? was then bootlegged frequently and released in a Japanese collectors edition. The soundtrack was recorded in two sessions, one of which was documented by British documentarian Dick Fontaine in secret.

== Release ==
The movie premiered at the Locarno Film Festival in 1965. For its Locarno premiere some of the Living Theatre actors in Europe hitchhiked to attend the Swiss festival. It was then re-edited with the Coleman soundtrack and screened at the Cannes Film Festival in 1966.

Director Thomas White intended the film to play in London in 1966 following Cannes, but it failed to happen and the film was unable to get a distribution deal.

== Rediscovery ==
The film was thought to be lost until Vanessa McDonnell, a Brooklyn-based documentary filmmaker and jazz enthusiast tracked the film down following the death of musician Ornette Coleman. She went through the phone book calling 'Thomas White's until she found the film's director and he unearthed a print in his garage. This print was repaired and converted into a digital archive print by John Klacsmann, of Anthology Film Archives.

== Reception ==
Salvador Dalí gave the film his endorsement after viewing the version with the Coleman soundtrack in Paris.
