= New York Contemporary Five =

American avant-garde jazz ensemble

- Origin: United States
- Genres: Jazz, avant-garde jazz
- Years active: 1963–64
- Labels: Fontana; Sonet; Savoy Records
- Past members: Don Cherry; Archie Shepp; John Tchicai; Don Moore; J.C. Moses; Ted Curson; Ronnie Boykins; Sunny Murray

The New York Contemporary Five was an avant-garde jazz ensemble active from the summer of 1963 to the spring of 1964. It has been described as "a particularly noteworthy group during its year of existence -- a pioneering avant-garde combo" and "a group which, despite its... short lease on life, has considerable historical significance." Author Bill Shoemaker wrote that the NYCF was "one of the more consequential ensembles of the early 1960s." John Garratt described them as "a meteor that streaked by too fast."

== Background ==
In November 1962, alto saxophonist John Tchicai moved from his home country of Denmark to New York City at the suggestion of tenor saxophonist Archie Shepp and trumpeter/composer Bill Dixon, whom he had met at the Helsinki Jazz Festival earlier that year. Upon arriving in New York, Tchicai began playing with Shepp's and Dixon's group, which had recently recorded the album Archie Shepp – Bill Dixon Quartet, and also sat in with trumpeter Don Cherry and various other musicians. According to Tchicai, the NYCF came into existence in the summer of 1963 "due to me being in contact with the guy who did the booking for the Montmartre Club. He said that if I had a group, we could come over and play the club in the fall for a couple of weeks. So I told this to Shepp and we decided to ask Cherry and [bassist] Don Moore if they were interested in forming a new group. We also needed to find a drummer, so we tried out Denis Charles, but that didn't work. Then we tried out Ed Blackwell, but he got sick due to his diabetes and we ended up with J.C. Moses." Cherry had recently left Sonny Rollins' quartet, with which he had recorded Our Man in Jazz, while Moore had been playing with Shepp's and Dixon's group, and Moses had been working with Eric Dolphy. Although Dixon did not play with the group, he contributed arrangements of various pieces.

The group rehearsed for a few weeks, then performed their first concert at Harout's Restaurant in Greenwich Village on August 17, 1963. On August 23, the group visited a New York recording studio. Cherry, however, was several hours late to the session, so Shepp, Tchicai, Moore, and Moses ended up recording a number of tracks as a quartet. Five of these tracks were released later that year by Fontana as the album Rufus. Once Cherry arrived, they proceeded, as a quintet, to record most of the tracks that were to appear on Consequences (also released by Fontana).

Several weeks after the recording session, the group left for Europe, where they toured for roughly three months thanks to Tchicai's advance bookings. While in Copenhagen, they recorded the albums Live At Koncertsal, Copenhagen (recorded on October 17, 1963 and released in 2019 on the Alternative Fox label) and Archie Shepp & the New York Contemporary Five (recorded on November 15, 1963 and originally released by Sonet as New York Contemporary 5 volumes 1 and 2 on two separate LPs). They also recorded a track ("Trio") which was added to Consequences. According to Tchicai, the European tour was a success: "we got good press in Copenhagen and Stockholm. This was probably because we were doing something a little different than most other guys at the time... I think our more traditional sound made it easier for people to get into us, as opposed to the difficulty some had with listening to Cecil Taylor's trio during that same period."

Following the European engagements, the NYCF fell apart, with Shepp staying in Europe to play with local musicians (with whom he recorded The House I Live In) and Cherry and Tchicai returning to New York, where they played with Pharoah Sanders. However, Shepp and Tchicai reconvened on February 5, 1964 for one last recording under the NYCF name thanks to Dixon's and Shepp's contractual obligations to provide Savoy Records with a final album, resulting in the B side of a split LP with Dixon's group (Bill Dixon 7-tette/Archie Shepp and the New York Contemporary 5). The album featured Ted Curson in place of Cherry on two tracks, and Ronnie Boykins and Sunny Murray in place of Moore and Moses respectively; as Tchicai put it, "this line-up of the NYCF was basically a totally different group." Following the group's breakup, Cherry joined Albert Ayler's group, Tchicai formed the New York Art Quartet with Roswell Rudd, and Shepp began recording under his own name for Impulse!. (Shepp's first album on Impulse!, Four for Trane, featured Tchicai.)

== Music and legacy ==
In an interview, Tchicai recalled some of the unique aspects of the NYCF, stating "we didn't have a piano in the group; we just had the three horns, bass and drums — that was kind of unusual for the time. We might have sounded a little bit like Ornette Coleman's quartet, but not quite as far out as that. We didn't have that many original compositions, as opposed to Coleman, who played his own material almost exclusively. We played Monk and some standards, and as our theme song, we had this piece by George Russell. We also played Shepp's pieces, one or two of Ornette's, and some of mine." In a similar vein, Ekkehard Jost wrote: "the NYCF takes the Ornette Coleman group of the late Fifties as the starting point for its own general musical conception. This means the negation of harmonic-metrical patterns. But it also means the retention of a steady, swinging basic rhythm and a quite conventional 'theme-solo improvisation-theme' form."

Jost also noted that "there was a social-psychological aspect that set the NYCF apart from the star-plus-sidemen ensembles of the time: its triumvirate of co-leaders. Far from being a purely theoretical structure, the democratic co-existence of three different temperaments... had a favorable effect on the group's musical variety." Jost wrote that Cherry's "playing is more relaxed and has more self-assurance than it does under Coleman.". Regarding the two saxophonists, a review in Rough Trade states: "Shepp and Tchicai offered two different ways forward for sax players: Shepp privileged texture, density, and fragmentation — a pointillist take on Ben Webster or Coleman Hawkins, perhaps. Tchicai was a master of melodic invention, teasing out hard and bright phrases that seem unpredictably off-kilter." Similarly, Jost wrote: "Tchicai's role in the NYCF is obviously that of a stylistic counter-force to Archie Shepp. In contrast to Shepp's extrovert and rhetorical style of improvising, a cooler (not colder), spun-out linearity prevails in Tchicai. His tone is less round, his phrasing more fluid."

Concerning the original material written by Cherry, Shepp, and Tchicai, Jost wrote that it is "carefully planned, and it is not treated merely as a peg on which to hang solo improvisations. The repertoire as a whole is, one might say, Janus-faced: one face looks back, the other forward toward a continuing development of knowledge gained from the jazz tradition." Jost noted that "Cherry's own contributions to the group's repertoire... show a side of him that could never have become prominent under the composer Ornette Coleman," but that "they are still very much in the vein of... Coleman's hectic angular lines." Jost described one of Tchicai's compositions as having "a balanced, calmly flowing linear quality, which makes it sound like a cool-jazz theme projected into free jazz." Shepp's pieces, on the other hand, consist of "discontinuous melodic fragments" exhibiting "conscious atomization of the phrase."

Jost summarized the legacy of the group as follows: "The real importance of the NYCF lay without question in the fact that as early as 1963 it assimilated various trends of new jazz and at the same time did not hesitate to reach back to older models. With a combination of these elements - and without sacrificing its own stylistic identity - it thereby laid the corner-stone of what might be called the mainstream of free jazz. The music of the NYCF may be eclectic in many respects, but it is eclectic in just as productive a way as the music of Charles Mingus was a few years earlier."

== Discography ==
- Consequences (Fontana, 1963; re-released in 2017 by Modern Silence; re-released again in 2020 by Ezz-thetics as part of Consequences Revisited)
- The New York Contemporary Five (Sonet, 1963; re-released in 2010 by Delmark Records)
- Bill Dixon 7-tette/Archie Shepp and the New York Contemporary Five (Savoy, 1964 (One side of LP); NYCF tracks re-released in 2020 by Ezz-thetics as part of Consequences Revisited)
- Live At Koncertsal, Copenhagen, 17.10.1963 (Alternative Fox, 2019)
