= Who's Crazy? =

Studio album by Ornette Coleman
- Released: 1979
- Recorded: 1966
- Venue: Paris
- Genre: Free jazz
- Label: Atmosphere Records; IRI 5006/5007

Volume Two cover

Who's Crazy?, Volumes 1 and 2, is a pair of albums by Ornette Coleman containing music that was intended as the soundtrack for the film of the same name, directed by Thomas White and featuring members of The Living Theatre. The albums feature Coleman on alto saxophone, trumpet, and violin, accompanied by double bassist David Izenzon and percussionist Charles Moffett. They were recorded in Paris during 1966, and were initially released on vinyl by Atmosphere Records, an imprint of the French I.R.I. label, with the title Who's Crazy? La Clef Des Champs. In 1982, both LPs were reissued by Affinity Records, a subsidiary of Charly Records, as part of a box set compilation.

== Background ==
While in Europe during 1966, Coleman was commissioned by Thomas White, an American living in Paris, to provide music for an experimental, black-and-white, largely-improvisational film titled Who's Crazy?. In the film, a group of patients from a mental institution, played by members of the Living Theatre, escape from a bus in a rural part of Belgium and retreat to an isolated farmhouse, where they form their own unique version of society. Coleman and the other members of his trio, bassist Izenzon and percussionist Moffett, recorded the music in a Paris studio in one take while watching the film projected on a wall. Additional music composed by Coleman for the occasion was performed by Marianne Faithfull. While the musicians were playing, English filmmaker Dick Fontaine filmed them, resulting in a short documentary titled David, Moffett and Ornette: The Ornette Coleman Trio. Although Who's Crazy? disappeared from sight before being resurrected by Kino Lorber in 2016, Coleman's soundtrack was released by several record labels over the years.

== Reception ==
Professional ratings
Review scores
Source	Rating
AllMusic	4/5 stars

In a review of the reissue for AllMusic, Scott Yanow noted that the musicians "did not merely provide filler music but full-blown improvisations that stand very much on their own," and wrote: "Fans of Coleman's very explorative music are advised to search for this valuable two-fer."

In an article for The New York Times, J. Hoberman stated that the activities of the actors are imbued "with tremendous energy" by "the polyrhythmic cascade of honks and squawks produced by Mr. Coleman, abetted by his sidemen." Fellow NYT writer Glenn Kenny called the film "a quirky but purposeful grafting of Mack Sennett to the French New Wave," but noted that "it's the soundtrack that has the staying power." He commented: "[it] isn't always conventionally effective 'movie music.' But it's always something special."

A reviewer for Dangerous Minds called the music "remarkable" and "nervous and beautifully chaotic," and described Fontaine's documentary as "an amazing treat, by far the most intimate portrait we have of this giant of jazz at the height of his powers."

Phil Freeman of Burning Ambulance stated that, although the film is "laughably bad," Coleman's soundtrack is "evocative and occasionally thrilling." Referring to a scene in which soldiers are sent to capture the inmates, he remarked: "The melody they work up as the 'crazies' are cavorting in the woods at the end is fantastic, as is the music heard during the soldiers' antics."

Critic Richard Brody noted that the trio's performances are "distinguished from Coleman's concert work by their terseness," and wrote: "If these abbreviated performances offer only a partial view of the trio's full powers, the recording... is still worthy to stand alongside the group's heralded mid-sixties albums, At the Golden Circle Stockholm Volumes 1 and 2; and Town Hall, 1962."

Author John Litweiler stated that the albums "are valuable on their own merits, apart from the music's film function," and suggested that Coleman can be heard "transforming himself" with his increased use of trumpet and violin improvisations.

== Track listing ==
Composed by Ornette Coleman.

Volume 1

1. "January" – 4:23
2. "Sortie Le Coquard" – 1:10
3. "Dans La Neige" – 7:50
4. "The Changes" – 10:03
5. "Better Get Yourself Another Self" – 9:22
6. "The Duel, Two Psychic Lovers and Eating Time" – 8:54

Volume 2

1. "The Mis-Used Blues (The Lovers and the Alchemist)" – 10:05
2. "The Poet" – 10:06
3. "Wedding Day and Fuzz" – 8:42
4. "Fuzz, Feast, Breakout, European Echoes, Alone and the Arrest" – 10:17

== Personnel ==
- Ornette Coleman – alto saxophone, violin, trumpet
- David Izenzon – double bass
- Charles Moffett – percussion
