= Archie Shepp & the New York Contemporary Five =

Live album by New York Contemporary Five
- Released: 1964
- Recorded: November 15, 1963
- Genre: Avant-garde jazz
- Length: 71:49
- Label: Sonet
- Producer: Robert G. Koester

Archie Shepp chronology
Consequences (1963)	Archie Shepp & the New York Contemporary Five (1964)	The House I Live In (1963)

Don Cherry chronology
Consequences (1963)	Archie Shepp & the New York Contemporary Five (1963)	Bill Dixon 7-tette/Archie Shepp and the New York Contemporary Five (1964)

Original Vol. 1 LP Cover

Archie Shepp & the New York Contemporary Five is a live album by the New York Contemporary Five recorded at the Jazzhus Montmartre in Copenhagen, Denmark, on November 15, 1963, and featuring saxophonists Archie Shepp and John Tchicai, trumpeter Don Cherry, bassist Don Moore and drummer J. C. Moses. The album was originally released on the Sonet label in 1964 as New York Contemporary 5 in two separate volumes on LP and later as an edited concert on a single CD, removing the track "Cisum."

== Reception ==
Professional ratings
Review scores
Source	Rating
Allmusic	4.5/5 stars
The Penguin Guide to Jazz	4/4 stars

The Allmusic review by Scott Yanow calls the album "historically significant". John Barron wrote that the album declared "the arrival of a bold musical endeavor, intent on championing new sounds, heavily influenced by Ornette Coleman, Thelonius Monk, John Coltrane and Cecil Taylor," and "Having stood the test of time, this historically important — but shamefully underappreciated — live recording of The New York Contemporary Five sounds fresh and far-reaching almost fifty years later." Jerry D'Souza wrote: "Given that the players went on to marked careers in the fiefdom of free jazz, this is certainly an historic document that stands as a take-off point." Zachary Young wrote: "There's little that hasn't been written already about these musicians. Suffice it to say that the present set finds them in excellent form. An egalitarian ethos permeates the performance; the musicians are equal partners, and no one horn predominates."

== Track listing ==
1. "Consequences" (Don Cherry) - 8:38
2. "Monk's Mood" (Thelonious Monk) - 2:30
3. "Emotions" (Ornette Coleman) - 8:44
4. "Wo Wo" (John Tchicai) - 5:51
5. "Trio" (Bill Dixon) - 15:28
6. "Crepuscule With Nellie" (Monk) - 2:15
7. "O.C." (Coleman) - 6:41
8. "When Will the Blues Leave?" (Coleman) - 8:58
9. "The Funeral" (Archie Shepp) - 5:05
10. "Mick" (Tchicai) - 7:39

Recorded in Copenhagen, Denmark on November 15, 1963.

== Personnel ==
- Archie Shepp: tenor saxophone
- John Tchicai: alto saxophone
- Don Cherry: trumpet
- Don Moore: bass
- J. C. Moses: drums
