= The House I Live In =

The House I Live In may refer to:

- The House I Live In (album), a 1993 live album by Archie Shepp and Lars Gullin
- The House I Live In (1945 film), a short film directed by Mervyn LeRoy
- The House I Live In (1957 film), a Soviet war film directed by Lev Kulidzhanov and Yakov Segel
- The House I Live In (2012 film), a documentary film directed by Eugene Jarecki
- "The House I Live In" (song), a song by Abel Meeropol and Earl Robinson, the title song of the 1945 film
