= The Gift (Charles Moffett album) =

Studio album by Charles Moffett
- Released: 1969
- Recorded: 1969
- Venue: New York City
- Genre: Free jazz
- Length: 36:23
- Label: Savoy; MG-12194
- Producer: Paul Jeffrey

Günter Sommer chronology
The Gift (1969)	The Charles Moffett Family-Vol. 1 (1975)

The Gift is an album by multi-instrumentalist Charles Moffett. It was recorded during 1969 in New York City, and was released the same year by Savoy Records. On the album, Moffett appears on drums, trumpet, and vibraphone, and is joined by saxophonist Paul Jeffrey, bassist Wilbur Ware, and drummer Dennis O'Tootle.

Moffett's son Codaryl, seven years old at the time of the recording, and now a recording artist, also appears on drums, and is credited for composing and titling the track "Avant Garde Got Soul Too." Concerning the tune's title, writer and radio host David Mittleman stated that it is "an attitude that says the traditional barriers between seemingly incompatible genres are a myth; everything is possible."

== Reception ==
Professional ratings
Review scores
Source	Rating
AllMusic	4/5 stars
The Encyclopedia of Popular Music	4/5 stars
MusicHound Jazz	3/5 stars
The Penguin Guide to Jazz	3/4 stars
The Virgin Encyclopedia of Jazz	4/5 stars

In a review for AllMusic, Scott Yanow wrote: "The songtitle 'Avant Garde Got Soul Too' pretty well sums up this adventurous but often surprisingly melodic set."

The authors of MusicHound Jazz stated: "Although he does shine on vibes and the occasional Ornette-like trumpet, most of the groove here is archaically funky, with the disruptions from Codaryl's elementary playing balanced by sympathetic bassman Wilbur Ware's simple bass style."

The authors of The Penguin Guide to Jazz Recordings called Moffett's trumpet playing "disconcertingly similar to Coleman's: raw, sharp and unevenly pitched, but with boundless energy and an exclamatory directness," while his vibes work is "much more recognizable as the man who skittered and thrashed his way through those legendary Scandinavian sessions," referring to At the "Golden Circle" Stockholm. They commented: "Something of a curiosity, this record; but anyone interested in the development and ramifications of Ornette's art should certainly try to find it."

== Track listing ==
Track timings not provided.

1. "Avant Garde Got Soul Too"
2. "Adverb"
3. "The Gift"
4. "Blues Strikes Again"
5. "Yelricks"

== Personnel ==
- Charles Moffett – drums, trumpet, vibraphone, vocals
- Paul Jeffrey – tenor saxophone, alto clarinet
- Wilbur Ware – bass
- Dennis O'Tootle – drums
- Codaryl Moffett – drums
