= Archie Shepp – Bill Dixon Quartet =

Studio album by Archie Shepp
- Released: October 1963
- Recorded: October 1962
- Genre: Avant-garde jazz
- Label: Savoy
- Producers: Archie Shepp, Bill Dixon

Archie Shepp chronology
Archie Shepp – Bill Dixon Quartet (1963)	Four for Trane (1964)

Bill Dixon chronology
Archie Shepp – Bill Dixon Quartet (1963)	Bill Dixon 7-tette/Archie Shepp and the New York Contemporary 5 (1964)

Peace Cover

Professional ratings
Review scores
Source	Rating
Allmusic	4/5 stars

Archie Shepp – Bill Dixon Quartet is the debut album by the jazz saxophonist Archie Shepp and trumpeter Bill Dixon. It was released through Savoy Records in 1963. The album features three performances by Shepp & Dixon with Don Moore and Paul Cohen and a version of Ornette Coleman's composition "Peace" with Reggie Workman and Howard McRae. The album was also rereleased in 1970 as Peace on the French BYG label, flipping the running order on side two ("Somewhere" followed by "Peace"), and on CD in 2010 as an "unauthorized European" edition on the Free Factory label, using the Savoy title but the BYG running order.

In his book Free Jazz, author Ekkehard Jost observed that among the things Shepp and Dixon had in common was "the ambition to play a kind of music unburdened by traditional constraints and yet retaining to a great extent the essence of older jazz styles." He wrote: "In several ways the quartet recalls the early Ornette Coleman groups. First, there is no piano. Second, in the general compositional and formal frame of reference and even in certain details of Shepp's improvisations, there is not much difficulty recognizing Coleman as the model... Third, as with Coleman, the tunes act principally as emotional triggers and not as determinants of harmony and form. The players improvise on a tonal centre..., or on a relatively flexible modal groundwork... In both cases a steady swinging beat is present at all times, with no recognizable symptoms of rhythmic dissociation."

== Reception ==
Richard Brody praised the album: "Dixon plays with a bright, fanfare-like tone and a stirring sense of drama — his solos seem constructed with discursive foresight, like a speaker putting together paragraphs that build to grand conclusions. His expansive, eloquent, distinctively mature and wise style contrasts with Shepp’s impulsive inventions and jaggedly guitar-like tones on tenor saxophone. The quartet's blend of rhapsodic melody and harmonic freedom makes for one of the most boldly yet intimately romantic recordings that modern jazz has to offer."

Joseph Neff wrote that the album "serves as an enlightening prologue to Dixon’s later masterworks, while being totally worthy on its own." He continued: "As on much of his early work, Shepp blows hard and raw... with the second half of 'Trio' becoming attractively harried. Just as illuminating is Dixon's writing, which if plainly avant-garde was never more peggable to the tradition than here; if he's not yet at the compositional level of Coleman, whose tune provides the trumpeter a fine platform for soloing, his talent is obvious... The best valve-blurt comes in the first half of 'Quartet'’s hearty slab of burning free-bop, with Shepp skronking up the later portion as Moore and Cohen rumble and clang throughout. The choice of 'Somewhere' mildly predicts Shepp's reading of 'The Girl from Ipanema' from Fire Music; the way he and Dixon tangle with the melody is a true gas and a valuable snapshot of a fleeting moment in the jazz avant-garde's development."

== Track listing ==
1. "Trio" (Bill Dixon) - 8:53
2. "Quartet" (Bill Dixon) - 9:16
3. "Peace" (Ornette Coleman) - 9:28
4. "Somewhere" (Leonard Bernstein) - 6:00

Recorded in NYC in October 1962

== Personnel ==
- Archie Shepp: tenor saxophone
- Bill Dixon: trumpet
- Don Moore: bass (tracks 1, 2 & 4)
- Reggie Workman: bass (track 3)
- Paul Cohen: drums (tracks 1, 2 & 4)
- Howard McRae: drums (track 3)
