= The Music of Ornette Coleman =

1967 studio album by Ornette Coleman

Studio album by Ornette Coleman with the Philadelphia Woodwind Quintet and the Chamber Symphony of Philadelphia String Quartet
- Released: 1967
- Recorded: March 17 and 31, 1967
- Studio: New York City
- Genre: Free jazz
- Labels: RCA Victor; RD-7944
- Producer: Howard Scott

The Music of Ornette Coleman is an album featuring music composed by Ornette Coleman. It was recorded during March 1967 in New York City, and was released later that year by RCA Victor. The album opens with a live recording of a wind quintet titled "Forms and Sounds," performed by the Philadelphia Woodwind Quintet, with Coleman providing trumpet interludes. This is followed by two string quartets, titled "Saints and Soldiers" and "Space Flight," performed by the Chamber Symphony of Philadelphia String Quartet.

An earlier version of "Forms and Sounds," without the trumpet interludes, was performed in London on August 29, 1965, and appears on An Evening with Ornette Coleman (Polydor, 1967). Regarding the work, Coleman stated that one of his goals was to allow the musicians "to create a new piece every time the composition was performed." He commented: "My term for this is 'improvise reading,' where an instrument has the possibility of changing the piece by a change in register." "Saints and Soldiers" was inspired by a December 1965 visit to Rome, where Coleman saw the remains of saints and soldiers in funerary urns. Concerning this visit, he reflected: "How incredible that persons of such opposite beliefs... could end up in exactly the same place - a jar." The remaining work, "Space Flight," is brief, fast, and features "structured, growing turbulence."

== Reception ==
Professional ratings
Review scores
Source	Rating
AllMusic	3/5 stars
The Virgin Encyclopedia of Jazz	3/5 stars

In a review for AllMusic, "Blue" Gene Tyranny wrote: "The LP includes 'Forms and Sounds'... with densities of melodies alternately free floating or played to an automaton pulse with bluesy, celebratory trumpet interludes... 'Saints and Soldiers' embodies the repression by the religious and political contrasted with saintly discernment, and 'Space Flight' has flashes of unidentified fluttering things which suddenly disappear."

Rock Salted's Syd Fablo called the album "a crucial recording in [Coleman's] catalog," and stated: "It presents a unique and important facet of his career. Even if less widely available than many other Coleman recordings, this one is worth seeking out."

Regarding "Forms and Sounds," Phil Freeman of Burning Ambulance remarked: "the call and response between the quintet and the trumpet is fascinating, because their playing is relatively gentle, while his is fierce and almost shrill." Concerning the string quartets, he noted that Coleman's "writing had grown more complex" since the 1962 Town Hall concert that featured a quartet titled "Dedication to Poets and Writers." He commented: "he sets the two violins up in a way that blurs the line between harmony and conflict, while the viola and cello are doing their own thing in the background.... there are occasional outbursts, but the bulk of 'Saints and Soldiers' is calm verging on mournful. 'Space Flight,' by contrast, is fast and twitchy, harsh and stabby."

== Track listing ==
All compositions by Ornette Coleman. Track timings not provided.

1. "Forms and Sounds"
2. "Saints and Soldiers"
3. "Space Flight"
- Recorded in New York City. Track 1 recorded on March 17, 1967. Tracks 2 and 3 recorded on March 31, 1967.

== Personnel ==
- Ornette Coleman – trumpet interludes (track 1)

The Philadelphia Woodwind Quintet (track 1)

- Murray Panitz – flute
- Anthony Gigliotti – clarinet
- John De Lancie – oboe
- Bernard Garfield – bassoon
- Mason Jones – French Horn

The Chamber Symphony of Philadelphia String Quartet (tracks 2 and 3)

- Stuart Canin – violin
- William Steck – violin
- Carlton Cooley – viola
- William Stokking – cello
