= J. C. Moses =

American jazz musician

J.C. Moses (October 18, 1936 – 1977) was an American jazz drummer.

He was born John Curtis Moses in Pittsburgh, Pennsylvania, United States, and first began playing around Pittsburgh in the 1950s with Stanley Turrentine and brother Tommy Turrentine. In the 1960s, he worked with Clifford Jordan, Kenny Dorham and Eric Dolphy. In 1963, he performed and recorded with the New York Contemporary Five, a group that included Archie Shepp, John Tchicai and Don Cherry among its members. In 1964, he played with Tchicai and Roswell Rudd in the New York Art Quartet, and following this with Bud Powell, Charles Lloyd, Roland Kirk, Andrew Hill and Sam Rivers. He moved to Copenhagen around 1969, where he was house drummer at the Montmartre Club, playing with Ben Webster and Dexter Gordon among others. He played less in the 1970s due to failing health, and returned to Pittsburgh, where he played with Nathan Davis and Eric Kloss. He never recorded as a leader.

Moses died in 1977, aged 41. According to jazz writer Francis Paudras, he was an adherent of the Black Muslim movement.

== Discography ==
With Eric Dolphy

- Iron Man (Douglas, 1963)
- Conversations (Fuel, 1963)
- The Illinois Concert (Blue Note, 1963 [1999])
- Eric Dolphy, Musical Prophet (Resonance, 2019)

With Kenny Dorham

- Matador (United Artists, 1962)

With Andrew Hill

- Change (Blue Note, 1966)

With Clifford Jordan

- Bearcat (Jazzland, 1962)

With Rahsaan Roland Kirk

- Kirk in Copenhagen (Mercury, 1963)

With Charles Lloyd

- Discovery! (Columbia, 1964)

With The New York Art Quartet

- Call It Art (Triple Point, 2013)

With Bud Powell

- The Return of Bud Powell (Roulette, 1964)

With Joe Sample

- Try Us (Sonet, 1969)

With Archie Shepp

- Rufus (Fontana, 1963)
- Consequences (Fontana, 1963)
- New York Contemporary Five Vol. 1 (Sonet, 1963)
- New York Contemporary Five Vol. 2 (Sonet, 1963)
- Fire Music (Impulse!, 1965)
- On This Night (Impulse!, 1965)

With Marzette Watts

- Marzette Watts and Company (ESP-Disk, 1968)
- The Marzette Watts Ensemble (Savoy, 1969)
