= Marzette Watts =

American jazz musician

Marzette Watts (March 9, 1938, Montgomery, Alabama – March 2, 1998, Nashville) was an American jazz tenor and soprano saxophonist. He performed and recorded on bass clarinet as well. He had a brief career in music and is revered for his 1966 self-titled free jazz release. He was known also as a sound engineer.

Watts played piano early in his life; he did not play music regularly in his teens. He studied at Alabama State College, where he was a founding member of SNCC; this association led to his being forced to leave the state at the behest of the governor of Alabama.

He moved to New York, where he lived in a loft building on Cooper Square which also had as a tenant Leroi Jones (later Amiri Baraka), with whom he participated in the Organization of Young Men. Watts returned to college in New York, completing his studies in 1962; he then moved to Paris to study painting at the Sorbonne and began playing saxophone for extra money.

Returning to New York in 1963, Watts studied under Don Cherry and played in his loft and around the city with Jiunie Booth, Henry Grimes, J.C. Moses, and others. He also continued painting, producing work strongly influenced by Willem de Kooning.

Watts's loft attracted many established and up-and-coming musicians who would hang out there and play at parties, including Ornette Coleman, Cecil Taylor, Don Cherry, Archie Shepp, and Pharoah Sanders.

In 1965 he decided to devote himself to music more fully, and moved to Denmark for further study. When he returned to New York in 1966, he recorded an album for ESP-Disk with the assistance of composer Clifford Thornton, and recorded a second album for Savoy Records in 1968. He wrote film scores and did production work for his own films, eventually abandoning music to work in film and record production.

Watts moved back and forth between Europe and New York; he taught briefly at Wesleyan University, assisting Sam Rivers and Clifford Thornton. Late in his life he moved to Santa Cruz, California. He died of heart failure in 1998.

== Discography ==
- Marzette Watts and Company (ESP-Disk, 1966)
- The Marzette Watts Ensemble (Savoy Records, 1968)
