= Finger Wigglers =

Studio album by Michael Bisio and Joe McPhee
- Released: 1997
- Recorded: September 18 & 19, 1996 at The Spirit Room in Rossie, New York.
- Genre: Jazz
- Length: 62:55
- Label: CIMP CIMP 132
- Producer: Robert D. Rusch

Joe McPhee chronology
Inside Out (1996)	Finger Wigglers (1997)	Specific Gravity (1997)

Finger Wigglers is an album by bassist Michael Bisio and multi-instrumentalist and composer Joe McPhee recorded in 1996 and first released on the CIMP label.

== Reception ==
Professional ratings
Review scores
Source	Rating
Allmusic	3/5 stars

Allmusic reviewer Scott Yanow states "This set will not convert listeners strictly into straight-ahead jazz, but it is a fine all-round outing for McPhee and the supportive bassist Bisio".

== Track listing ==
All compositions by Joe McPhee except as indicated

1. "Lonely Woman" (Ornette Coleman) - 11:00
2. "Blue Monk" (Thelonious Monk) - 6:53
3. "Here's That Rainy Day" (Jimmy Van Heusen, Johnny Burke) - 8:38
4. "Running Out of Time" - 4:17
5. "Malachi" - 5:46
6. "Going Home" (Traditional) - 6:20
7. "Walking Out" (Michael Bisio) - 8:44
8. "Lonely Woman" [Take 2] (Coleman) - 8:34

== Personnel ==
- Joe McPhee - tenor saxophone
- Michael Bisio - bass
