= Single Piece Flow =

Studio album by The Vandermark 5
- Released: 1997
- Recorded: August 10 & 11, 1996
- Studio: Überstudio, Chicago
- Genre: Jazz
- Length: 58:07
- Label: Atavistic

Ken Vandermark chronology
Real Time (1997)	Single Piece Flow (1997)	Fred Anderson / DKV Trio (1997)

Single Piece Flow is an album by American jazz reedist Ken Vandermark, which was recorded in 1996 and released on Atavistic. It was the debut of the Vandermark 5, which features Mars Williams on reeds, Jeb Bishop on trombone and guitar, Kent Kessler on bass and Tim Mulvenna on drums.

== Reception ==
Professional ratings
Review scores
Source	Rating
AllMusic	4/5 stars
The Penguin Guide to Jazz	3.5/4 stars
Down Beat	4/5 stars

In his review for AllMusic, Brian Olewnick states "The musicians are all up to the task... But the 'stars' of the album are the compositions themselves, probing and muscular, offering a fresh way through the stasis that was building in some circles of avant jazz by the mid-'90s."

The Penguin Guide to Jazz says "Almost temperate in parts, there's some exemplary use of the group as a unit, with a piece like 'The Mark Inside' offering a sort of jaundiced twist on jazz tradition."

The Down Beat review by Aaron Cohen notes that "Vandermark's themes are often based around endearing riffs that are never merely cute and provide a lively framework for each performer's agility."

== Track listing ==
All compositions by Ken Vandermark

1. "Careen" – 7:00
2. "Momentum" – 7:16
3. "Fence" – 7:01
4. "Data Janitor" – 9:42
5. "The Mark Inside" – 6:45
6. "Wood-Skin Metal" – 6:10
7. "Billboard" (Jim Baker) – 4:57
8. "Limited Edition" – 9:16

== Personnel ==
- Jeb Bishop – trombone, guitar
- Kent Kessler – bass
- Tim Mulvenna – drums
- Ken Vandermark – reeds
- Mars Williams – reeds
