= Legend Street Two =

Studio album by Joe McPhee Quintet
- Released: 1996
- Recorded: June 1 & 2, 1996 at The Spirit Room in Rossie, New York.
- Genre: Jazz
- Length: 62:55
- Label: CIMP CIMP 132
- Producer: Robert D. Rusch

Joe McPhee chronology
Legend Street One (1996)	Legend Street Two (1996)	Inside Out (1996)

Legend Street Two is an album by multi-instrumentalist and composer Joe McPhee recorded in 1996 and first released on the CIMP label.

== Reception ==
Professional ratings
Review scores
Source	Rating
Allmusic	4/5 stars
The Penguin Guide to Jazz Recordings	3/4 stars

Allmusic reviewer Thom Jurek states " it's a breathless and beautiful tapestry of multiphonic jazz art. Legend Street Two is further evidence why Joe McPhee is the real guy to watch in the 21st century; it feels like he's just getting warmed up". Writing for JazzTimes, John Murph said "With more emphasis on sound than song, Legend Street Two illustrates McPhee's penchant for creating terse, sonically bewildering soundscapes. ...Uncompromising in both structure and sound, Legend Street Two is a "for members only" listening experience".

== Track listing ==
All compositions by Joe McPhee except as indicated

1. "Something Sweet, Something Tender" (Eric Dolphy) - 14:57
2. "Consider the Alternative" - 8:59
3. "Double Ten" - 11:04
4. "E.P." - 1:54
5. "Dark Doings" - 14:57
6. "There Was a Flower Near Napoli" (Charles Tyler) - 5:07
7. "Not Absolute" - 5:57

== Personnel ==
- Joe McPhee - pocket trumpet, tenor saxophone, alto saxophone, flugelhorn
- Frank Lowe - tenor saxophone
- David Prentice - violin
- Charles Moffett - drums
