= As Serious As Your Life =

1998 solo album by Joe McPhee

As Serious as Your Life

Studio album by Joe McPhee
- Released: 1998
- Recorded: May 27, 1996
- Studio: Mixtery in Trumbull, Connecticut
- Genre: Jazz
- Length: 56:48
- Label: HatHut hatOLOGY 514
- Producer: Pia & Werner X. Uehlinger

Joe McPhee chronology
A Meeting in Chicago (1996)	As Serious as Your Life (1998)	Legend Street One (1996)

As Serious as Your Life is a solo album by the multi-instrumentalist and composer Joe McPhee, recorded in 1996 and released on the Swiss HatHut label in 1998. The title track is named for the 1977 book by Val Wilmer.

== Reception ==
Professional ratings
Review scores
Source	Rating
AllMusic	4/5 stars
The Penguin Guide to Jazz Recordings	4/4 stars

AllMusic reviewer Brian Olewnick stated: "As Serious as Your Life offers a fairly wide picture of the range of his talents and creative genius, and is arguably the finest of his solo recordings. Highly recommended."

== Track listing ==
All compositions by Joe McPhee except as indicated

1. "The Death of Miles Davis" - 6:28
2. "A Wish in One Hand" - 6:42
3. "Ain't Nothin' But the Blues" - 5:30
4. "As Serious as Your Life 1" - 9:11
5. "Haiku Study 1" - 4:43
6. "Conlon in the Land of Ra" - 5:10
7. "The Man I Love" (George Gershwin, Ira Gershwin) - 6:47
8. "Tok" - 2:27
9. "As Serious as Your Life 2" - 3:21
10. "After the Rain" (John Coltrane) - 5:26
11. "Party Lights" - 1:03

== Personnel ==
- Joe McPhee - reeds, pocket cornet, piano, electronics
