= The Marzette Watts Ensemble =

Studio album by Marzette Watts
- Released: 1969
- Recorded: 1968
- Studio: New York City
- Genre: Free jazz
- Length: 34:48
- Label: Savoy Records; MG-12193
- Producer: Bill Dixon

Marzette Watts chronology
Marzette Watts and Company (1968)	The Marzette Watts Ensemble (1969)

The Marzette Watts Ensemble is the second and final album by saxophonist and composer Marzette Watts. It was recorded in 1968 in New York City, and was released on LP by Savoy Records in 1969. On the album, Watts is joined by cornetist George Turner, trombonist Marty Cook, violinist Frank Kipers, vocalists Amy Schaeffer and Patty Waters, pianist Bobby Few, bassists Cevera Jeffries (listed as "Cevera Jehers"), Juny Booth, and Steve Tintweiss, and drummers J. C. Moses and Tom Berge. The album was produced by Bill Dixon, whose composition "octobersong" is featured, and who also provided liner notes and played piano on one track.

The Marzette Watts Ensemble is the followup to Marzette Watts and Company, which was recorded in 1966 and released by ESP-Disk in 1968. "Play It Straight" and "Lonely Woman" were included in the 1979 Savoy compilation New Music: Second Wave.

== Reception ==
Professional ratings
Review scores
Source	Rating
AllMusic	4.5/5 stars

The editors of AllMusic awarded the album 4 1/2 stars.

In an article for Paris Transatlantic, Clifford Allen wrote: "Less of a blowing session than Marzette & Company, it's a record equally deserving of reissue. It's a shame he didn't record more – three years after the debut, his chops seemed to be coming together and his tone on tenor was quite velvety – but these mysterious snapshots are enough to get at the essence of this Renaissance man well respected by his peers."

Guitarist Thurston Moore included the album in his "Top Ten From The Free Jazz Underground" list, first published in 1995 in the second issue of the defunct Grand Royal Magazine.

== Track listing ==
=== Side A ===
1. "octobersong" (Bill Dixon) – 7:04
2. "Play It Straight" (Ornette Coleman) – 3:47
3. "F.L.O.A.R.S.S." (Marzette Watts) – 4:58

=== Side B ===
1. "Medley" (Marzette Watts) – 9:03
2. "Lonely Woman" (Ornette Coleman, lyrics by Patty Waters) – 5:52
3. "Joudpoo" (Marzette Watts) – 4:04

== Personnel ==
- Marzette Watts – tenor saxophone
- George Turner – cornet
- Marty Cook – trombone
- Frank Kipers – violin
- Amy Schaeffer – vocals
- Patty Waters – vocals
- Bobby Few – piano
- Bill Dixon – piano (track 2)
- Cevera Jeffries (listed as "Cevera Jehers") – bass
- Juney Booth – bass
- Steve Tintweiss – bass
- J. C. Moses – drums
- Tom Berge – drums
