= Fritz Hauser =

Swiss musical artist (born 1953)

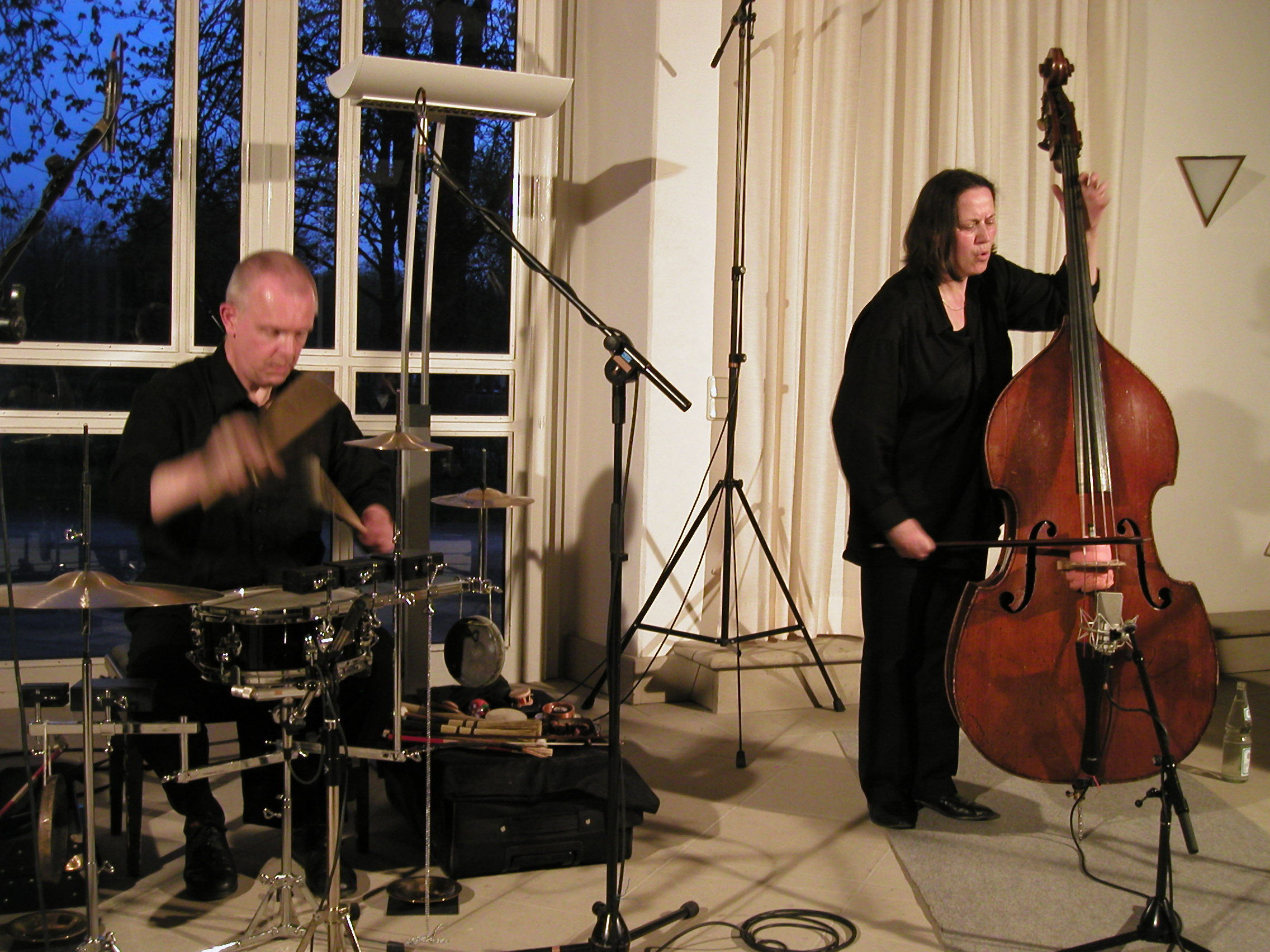
- Joëlle Léandre (standing) and Fritz Hauser with Quartet Noir in Weikersheim Castle

Background information
- Origin: Basel, Switzerland
- Genres: Contemporary classical music
- Occupations: Musician, Composer
- Instruments: Drums, marimba
- Website: Fritz Hauser.ch/

Fritz Hauser (born March 29, 1953, Basel) is a Swiss drummer, percussionist, and composer from Basel, Switzerland. He began playing drums as a teenager, and later studied classical percussion at the City of Basel Music Academy.

In 1972 he joined the Swiss symphonic rock band Circus, with whom he toured and recorded albums over the next eight years. In 1980 he began performing medieval music as part of a duo and also worked in pit orchestras, theater productions, and as a drummer in circus bands.

In 1982 he joined the resident band of a Swiss radio station, and in 1983 he began performing and touring internationally as well as recording as a solo artist. In 1986, he organized the percussion group Schlagzeugspektakel, which consisted of a total of 41 drummers, all from Basel. The group toured Switzerland and was featured on Swiss radio. Since then, Hauser has performed and recorded in a various of trios and quartets.

== Principal Compositions ==
- On Time and Space (for 50 cymbals)
- Die Klippe (for marimba and 3 cymbals)
- Der Pendler (for drum kit)
- Le souvenir (for 4 snare drums, 2 triangles, bass drum and sports bag)
- Musique pour les bains thermaux de Vals (Grisons) (musical stones)

== Discography ==
With Joe McPhee

- Linear B (Hat Hut, 1990)
