= Real Time (Steam album) =

Studio album by Steam
- Released: 1997
- Recorded: April 5 & 6, 1996
- Studio: Airwave, Chicago
- Genre: Jazz
- Length: 62:51
- Label: Eighth Day Music, Atavistic
- Producer: Steam

Ken Vandermark chronology
A Meeting in Chicago (1997)	Real Time (1997)	Single Piece Flow (1997)

reissue cover

Real Time is an album by American jazz reedist Ken Vandermark, which was released in 1997 on Eighth Day Music and reissued in 2000 with new artwork by Atavistic. He leads the quartet Steam with pianist Jim Baker, bassist Kent Kessler and drummer Tim Mulvenna. The band was formed in part to dip into the repertoire of the post-changes jazz tradition, playing live covers of tunes by Anthony Braxton, Sun Ra, Ornette Coleman and Eric Dolphy. On their debut, the group chose exclusively to deal with its own pieces: six by Vandermark and three by Baker.

== Reception ==
Professional ratings
Review scores
Source	Rating
AllMusic	4.5/5 stars
The Penguin Guide to Jazz	3/4 stars
Down Beat	4/5 stars

In his review for AllMusic, Tom Schulte states "Vandermark brings from his Vandermark 5 his trademark hard-edged horn gusto while working in the jazz group ideal of each member stepping forward supported by the rest."

The Penguin Guide to Jazz says "The usual quota of interest, but it would have been more exciting to see how they dealt with a set of covers."

The Down Beat review by Aaron Cohen says "Try to imagine Eric Dolphy with a more audible sense of the humor combined with a more beat-heavy Herbie Nichols, and the resulting blend would approximate Steam."

== Track listing ==
All compositions by Ken Vandermark except as indicated

1. "No Go" – 5:53
2. "Non-Confirmation" (Jim Baker) – 6:24
3. "Situation Travesty" (Jim Baker) – 9:26
4. "Explosive Motor" – 7:00
5. "A Memory of No Thoughts" – 5:59
6. "Chump Change" – 6:40
7. "Correlative Amnesia" (Jim Baker) – 7:19
8. "Tellefero" – 7:02
9. "Tableau Shot" – 7:08

== Personnel ==
- Jim Baker – piano
- Ken Vandermark – reeds
- Kent Kessler – bass
- Tim Mulvenna – drums
