= Kirk in Copenhagen =

Live album by Roland Kirk
- Released: 1964
- Recorded: October 1963
- Venue: Club Monmartre, Copenhagen, Denmark
- Genre: Jazz
- Label: Mercury

Roland Kirk chronology
| The Roland Kirk Quartet Meets the Benny Golson Orchestra (1964) | Kirk in Copenhagen (1964) | Gifts & Messages (1964) |

Professional ratings
Review scores
| Source | Rating |
|---|---|
| AllMusic | 4/5 stars |
| The Penguin Guide to Jazz Recordings | 2.5/4 stars |

Kirk in Copenhagen is a live album by jazz multi-instrumentalist Roland Kirk recorded in October 1963 at the Club Monmartre in Copenhagen, Denmark. It was originally released on the Mercury label in 1964 and features performances by Kirk with Tete Montoliu, Niels-Henning Ørsted Pedersen, Don Moore and J.C. Moses and a guest appearance by Sonny Boy Williamson, credited as "Big Skol".

== Critical reception ==
The AllMusic review by Lindsay Planer and Thom Jurek states: "Although somewhat ragtag in derivation, the combo quickly finds its sonic niche... providing Kirk plenty of space to improvise wildly, utilizing his clever wit and immensely expressive musicality".

== Track listing ==
All compositions by Roland Kirk except where noted.

1. "Narrow Bolero" - 5:23
2. "Mingus-Griff Song" - 8:07
3. "The Monkey Thing" - 5:43
4. "Mood Indigo" (Barney Bigard, Duke Ellington, Irving Mills) - 7:17
5. "Cabin in the Sky" (Vernon Duke, John Latouche) - 7:46
6. "On the Corner of King and Scott Streets" - 4:12

== Personnel ==
- Roland Kirk – tenor saxophone, manzello, stritch, flute, siren
- Tete Montoliu – piano
- Niels-Henning Ørsted Pedersen – bass
- J.C. Moses – drums
- Don Moore – bass
- Big Skol – harmonica (track 3)
