= Decision in Paradise =

Studio album by Frank Lowe
- Released: 1985
- Recorded: September 24 & 28, 1984; Vanguard Studios, New York
- Genre: Jazz
- Length: 38:57
- Label: Soul Note; SN 1082
- Producer: Giovanni Bonandrini

Kenny Wheeler chronology
Isle in the Ocean (1984)	Decision in Paradise (1985)	Inappropriate Choices (1991)

Professional ratings
Review scores
Source	Rating
Allmusic	4/5 stars

Decision in Paradise is an album by Frank Lowe recorded in 1984 and released on the Soul Note label.

== Reception ==
The Allmusic review states, "Although a touch more conservative than one might expect (more of an open-minded straightahead set than music emphasizing sound explorations), all six group originals are of interest".

== Track listing ==
All compositions by Frank Lowe except as indicated

1. "Decision in Paradise - 5:05
2. "I'll Whistle Your Name" (Butch Morris) - 3:27
3. "Cherryco" (Don Cherry) - 6:03
4. "Lowe-Ologie" - 5:28
5. "You Dig!" (Grachan Moncur III) - 8:23
6. "Dues and Don'ts" - 10:57

== Personnel ==
- Frank Lowe - tenor saxophone
- Don Cherry - trumpet
- Grachan Moncur III - trombone
- Geri Allen - piano
- Charnett Moffett - bass
- Charles Moffett - drums
