= McPhee/Parker/Lazro =

Live album by Joe McPhee, Evan Parker and Daunik Lazro
- Released: 1996
- Recorded: 13 May 1995 at La Manufacture - Atelier du Rhin in Colmar and 23 May 1995 at Festival Musique Action '95, in Vandoeuvre-les-Nancy.
- Genre: Jazz
- Length: 62:55
- Label: Vand'Oeuvre CIMP 132
- Producer: Robert D. Rusch

Joe McPhee chronology
Sweet Freedom - Now What? (1994)	McPhee/Parker/Lazro (1996)	Common Threads (1995)

Evan Parker chronology
Breaths and Heartbeats (1995)	McPhee/Parker/Lazro (1996)	Tempranillo (1996)

McPhee/Parker/Lazro is a live album by saxophonists Joe McPhee, Evan Parker and Daunik Lazro recorded in France in 1995 and first released on the Vand'Oeuvre label.

== Reception ==
Professional ratings
Review scores
Source	Rating
AllMusic	3/5 stars
Encyclopedia of Popular Music	3/5 stars

AllMusic reviewer Thom Jurek states "This isn't a noodle fest, but it is very subdued with little change in dynamic throughout. This is a disc for people who like to think about the saxophone or hear Joe McPhee practice with a couple of other guys".

== Track listing ==
All compositions by Joe McPhee, Evan Parker and Daunik Lazro

1. "The Emmet's Inch" - 36:59
2. "The Snake and the Scorpion" (McPhee, Parker) - 4:36
3. "Fire on the Water" (Lazro, McPhee) - 7:06
4. "And Eagle's Mile" - 14:53

== Personnel ==
- Joe McPhee - pocket trumpet, soprano saxophone, alto saxophone, alto clarinet
- Evan Parker - soprano saxophone, tenor saxophone
- Daunik Lazro - alto saxophone, baritone saxophone
