= Sweet Freedom - Now What? =

Studio album by Joe McPhee
- Released: 1995
- Recorded: July 27 & 28, 1994
- Venue: Radio DRS Zürich, Switzerland
- Genre: Jazz
- Length: 72:31
- Label: HatHut hat ART CD 6162
- Producer: Pia & Werner X. Uehlinger

Joe McPhee chronology
Impressions of Jimmy Giuffre (1991)	Sweet Freedom - Now What? (1995)	McPhee/Parker/Lazro (1995)

Sweet Freedom - Now What? is an album by multi-instrumentalist and composer Joe McPhee, recorded in 1994 and first released on the Swiss HatHut label.

== Reception ==
Professional ratings
Review scores
Source	Rating
Allmusic	2.5/5 stars

Allmusic reviewer Alex Henderson states "In 1994, Joe McPhee entered a studio in Zurich, Switzerland and recorded this thoughtful yet chance-taking response to Max Roach's ambitious Freedom Now Suite of 1960 ... McPhee doesn't treat Roach's compositions like museum pieces; instead, he embraces them on his own terms and brings many of his own ideas to the table ... the element of surprise is exactly what McPhee is going for on this rewarding, AACM-influenced inside/outside date".

== Track listing ==
All compositions by Max Roach except as indicated

1. "Mendacity (slow)" (Roach, C. Bayen) - 4:34
2. "Driva Man" (Roach, Oscar Brown, Jr.) - 4:21
3. "Roost 2" (Lisle Ellis) - 4:27
4. "Self Portrait/Lift Every Voice and Sing" (Roach/James Weldon Johnson, J. Rosamond Johnson) - 9:50
5. "Singing With a Sword in My Hand" (Traditional) - 1:23
6. "Roost 1" (Ellis) - 2:25
7. "Garvey's Ghost" - 12:45
8. "Approaching the Smoke That Thunders" (Ellis) - 4:53
9. "Triptych: (Prayer, Protest)/Prolepsis" (Max Roach/Paul Plimley) - 7:54
10. "Mendacity (fast)" (Roach, Bayen) - 6:02
11. "A Head of the Heartbeat" (Paul Plimley) - 3:38
12. "The Persistence of Rosewood" (Joe McPhee) - 9:39
13. "Roost (Coda)" (Ellis) - 0:40

== Personnel ==
- Joe McPhee - tenor saxophone, soprano clarinet, alto clarinet
- Lisle Ellis - bass
- Paul Plimley - piano
