= Impressions of Jimmy Giuffre =

Studio album by Joe McPhee Trio
- Released: 1991
- Recorded: April 14 & 15, 1991 at Studio Cactus in Marseille, France.
- Genre: Jazz
- Length: 45:02
- Label: CELP C21
- Producer: André Jaume and Robert Bonaccorsi

Joe McPhee chronology
Élan Impulse (1991)	Impressions of Jimmy Giuffre (1991)	Sweet Freedom - Now What? (1995)

Impressions of Jimmy Giuffre is an album by multi-instrumentalist and composer Joe McPhee dedicated to Jimmy Giuffre, recorded in 1991 and first released on the French CELP label.

== Reception ==
Professional ratings
Review scores
Source	Rating
Allmusic	4.5/5 stars
The Penguin Guide to Jazz Recordings	3.5/4 stars

Allmusic reviewer Alain Drouot states "This beautiful set is full of a unique tenderness, and comes out as a very personal statement that should not be missed".

== Track listing ==
All compositions by Jimmy Giuffre except as indicated

1. "The Train and the River" - 3:02
2. "Zigliara I" (Raymond Boni, André Jaume, Joe McPhee) - 3:30
3. "Zigliara II" (Boni, Jaume, McPhee) - 1:57
4. "Lazy Tones" - 2:38
5. "Nenette" (Joe McPhee) - 6:22
6. "Chirpin' Time" - 4:06
7. "La Vie Continue (For Alton Pickens)" (McPhee) - 3:22
8. "Give Them Their Flowers While They're Here" (McPhee) - 3:30
9. "Finger Snapper" - 1:58
10. "A Portrait of Juanita" (Boni, Jaume) - 3:10
11. "Slow Glow" (Boni, McPhee) - 4:30
12. "Little Big Foot" (McPhee) - 3:00
13. "The Train and the River" - 3:57

== Personnel ==
- Joe McPhee - soprano saxophone, valve trombone
- André Jaume - bass clarinet, tenor saxophone
- Raymond Boni - guitar
