= David Izenzon =

American jazz double bassist (1932–1979)

Background information
- Born: May 17, 1932; Pittsburgh, Pennsylvania, U.S.
- Died: October 8, 1979 (aged 47) New York City, New York, U.S.
- Genres: Jazz
- Occupation: Musician
- Instrument: Double bass

David Izenzon (May 17, 1932 – October 8, 1979) was an American jazz double bassist.

== Biography ==
Izenzon was born in Pittsburgh, Pennsylvania, United States. He graduated from the Carnegie Institute of Technology, now Carnegie Mellon University, and later received a master's degree from the Manhattan School of Music.

Izenzon began playing double bass at the age of twenty-four. He played in his hometown before moving to New York City in 1961 where he played with Paul Bley, Archie Shepp, Sonny Rollins, and Bill Dixon. He is best known for his association with Ornette Coleman, which began in October 1961. He played in Coleman's Town Hall, 1962 concert and played with him frequently from 1965 to 1968, often in a trio format with drummer Charles Moffett. During this time, Izenzon also recorded with Harold McNair and Yoko Ono. From 1968 to 1971, he taught music history at Bronx Community College and played with Perry Robinson and Paul Motian, but reduced his time in music in 1972 when his son became ill. In 1973 Izenzon received a Ph.D. in psychotherapy from Northwestern University. The following year, he co-founded Potsmokers Anonymous with his wife, Pearl. In 1975 he composed a jazz opera entitled How Music Can Save the World, dedicated to those who helped his son recover. From 1977, Izenzon worked again with Coleman and Motian, up until his death in 1979.

Izenzon had a heart attack and was dead on arrival at Bellevue Hospital in New York City. He was survived by his wife and two sons.

== Legacy ==
Bassist John Lindberg dedicated his 1997 album Offers for Luminosity to Izenzon.

In his book The Freedom Principle, John Litweiler praised Izenzon's playing:

David Izenzon brought a major advance in jazz bass playing and in the structure of the jazz ensemble... Traditionally the bass's role in jazz had been to ground the ensemble pulse... But Izenzon was as likely to provide melodic line as pulse, avoiding direct rhythmic reference, contradicting his partners' tempos, and playing arco at least as often as he played pizzicato. The genius of Izenzon's music is that he did not become an independent voice in [Coleman's] trio; his fine sensitivity created ensemble tension so that in a discursive performance... Izenzon becomes a source of unity... After the self-dramatizing of Mingus and LaFaro, it's a paradox that Izenzon, the most active of bass virtuosos, sounds so completely effortless. You're not overwhelmed at his speed; his music flows so naturally and lyrically, without excess, that even his blurring of pitch does not seem extreme. Izenzon was especially devoted to bass sound. At a time when electronic amplification was becoming standard for jazz bassists, he didn't use an amplifier even though he played softly; also, his experience in both jazz and contemporary classical techniques gave him a broad expressive range.

== Discography ==
With Barry Altschul and Perry Robinson

- Stop Time: Live at Prince Street, 1978 (NoBusiness, 2023)

With Jaki Byard

- Sunshine of My Soul (Prestige, 1967)

With Ornette Coleman

- Town Hall, 1962 (ESP, 1962)
- Chappaqua Suite (Columbia, 1965)
- An Evening with Ornette Coleman (Polydor, 1965)
- At the Golden Circle Stockholm (Blue Note, 1965)
- Who's Crazy? Vol. 1 & 2 (Jazz Atmosphere, 1979)
- The Love Revolution (Gambit, 2005) – recorded in 1968; music previously issued on Live In Milano 1968 and The Unprecedented Music of Ornette Coleman

With Steve Kuhn and Toshiko Akiyoshi

- The Country and Western Sound of Jazz Pianos (Dauntless, 1963)

With Harold McNair

- Affectionate Fink (Island, 1965)

With Paul Motian

- Dance (ECM, 1977)

With Yoko Ono

- Yoko Ono/Plastic Ono Band (Apple, 1968)

With Joseph Scianni

- Man Running (Savoy, 1965)

With Archie Shepp

- Bill Dixon 7-tette/Archie Shepp and the New York Contemporary 5 (Savoy, 1964)
- Fire Music (Impulse!, 1965)
- On This Night (Impulse!, 1965)
- Further Fire Music (Impulse!, 1965)

With Sonny Rollins

- The Standard Sonny Rollins (RCA, 1964)
- The Alternative Rollins (RCA, 1964)

With Bob Thiele

- Head Start (Flying Dutchman, 1967)
