= A Meeting in Chicago =

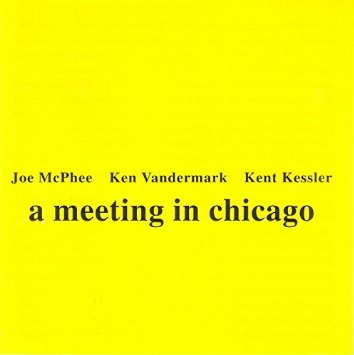

Studio album by Joe McPhee, Ken Vandermark, Kent Kessler
- Released: 1997
- Recorded: February 14, 1996
- Studio: Überstudio, Chicago
- Genre: Jazz
- Length: 55:12
- Label: Eighth Day Music, Okka Disk
- Producer: McPhee/Vandermark/Kessler

Ken Vandermark chronology
Blow Horn (1997)	A Meeting in Chicago (1997)	Real Time (1997)

Joe McPhee chronology
Common Threads (1996)	A Meeting in Chicago (1996)	As Serious As Your Life (1996)

reissue cover

A Meeting in Chicago is an album by trumpeter/saxophonist Joe McPhee, reedist Ken Vandermark and bassist Kent Kessler, which was released in 1997 on Eighth Day Music and reissued the following year with new artwork by Okka Disk. The album documents trio, duo and solo improvisations recorded all in a single take with no rehearsal, before playing their first concert later that night at The Empty Bottle. Vandermark cites McPhee’s solo recording Tenor as a major influence.

== Reception ==
Professional ratings
Review scores
Source	Rating
AllMusic	4/5 stars
The Penguin Guide to Jazz	4/4 stars

In her review for AllMusic, Joslyn Layne states "Ranging from fast and active to mellow and sparse, this recording session of truly excellent players holds many interesting moments for fans."

The Penguin Guide to Jazz says "This extraordinary set could almost be the work of some as yet unknown, conservatory-trained but sceptical modernist who has written his thesis on the wind groups of early modernism, those experimenters who took perverse delight in trying combinations that had not been heard since the classical era."

== Track listing ==
All compositions by McPhee/Vandermark/Kessler except as indicated

1. "A Meeting in Chicago" – 5:12
2. "Heart of the Matter" – 2:25
3. "Matter of the Heart" – 4:55
4. "Soft Circles" (McPhee) – 2:28
5. "Breakneck Ridge" (Vandermark, Kessler) – 2:12
6. "Central Wisconsin Double Wide" (Kessler) – 4:43
7. "Hard Circles" (McPhee, Vandermark) – 6:06
8. "Zahava" (McPhee, Vandermark) – 3:26
9. "Menga Kala Koota" – 3:04
10. "Empty Bottle Blues" – 5:06
11. "Lalibela" – 8:53
12. "Fourteen Years Later" (Vandermark) – 2:28
13. "I Leave You Love" (McPhee, Kessler) – 4:10

== Personnel ==
- Joe McPhee – brass, reeds
- Ken Vandermark – reeds
- Kent Kessler – bass
