= Linear B (album) =

Studio album by Joe McPhee Po Music
- Released: 1991
- Recorded: January 9–12, 1990 at Radio DRS Zurich, Switzerland.
- Genre: Jazz
- Length: 67:04
- Label: HatHut hat ART CD 6057
- Producer: Pia & Werner X. Uehlinger

Joe McPhee chronology
Songs and Dances (1987)	Linear B (1991)	Élan Impulse (1991)

Linear B is an album by multi-instrumentalist and composer Joe McPhee, recorded in 1990 and first released on the Swiss HatHut label.

== Reception ==
Professional ratings
Review scores
Source	Rating
Allmusic	4/5 stars

Allmusic reviewer Brian Olewnick states "Linear B covers enough of McPhee's stylistic oeuvre, and is fine enough in and of itself, to make it an excellent introduction to his work. Recommended".

== Track listing ==
All compositions by Joe McPhee except as indicated

1. "Love Life" - 9:59
2. "Make a Circle" - 7:35
3. "Linear B" - 4:39
4. "Say That to Say This" - 5:14
5. "Footprints" (Wayne Shorter) - 10:25
6. "Little Piece 1" - 2:05
7. "Little Piece 2" - 2:20
8. "Little Piece 3" - 2:16
9. "Little Piece 4" - 2:01
10. "Little Piece 5" - 2:16
11. "Here's That Rainy Day" (Johnny Burke, Jimmy Van Heusen) - 5:44
12. "Imagine a World Without Art" - 5:52
13. "Voices" - 6:38

== Personnel ==
- Joe McPhee - flugelhorn, pocket trumpet, soprano saxophone, electronics
- André Jaume - clarinet, bass clarinet, tenor saxophone (tracks 1, 5, 8 & 12
- Urs Leimgruber - soprano saxophone, tenor saxophone (tracks 2 & 4)
- Christy Doran (tracks 7 & 13), Raymond Boni (tracks 1, 5, 9, 12 & 13) - guitar
- Léon Francioli - bass (tracks 1, 3, 5, 6 & 11–13)
- Fritz Hauser - drums (tracks 1–3, 5–10 & 12)
