= Élan Impulse =

Live album by Joe McPhee, Danuik Lazro
- Released: 1991
- Recorded: April 1991 at the 3ème Nuit Culturelle in Nancy, France
- Genre: Jazz
- Length: 61:52
- Label: Insitu IS 075
- Producer: Pia & Werner X. Uehlinger

Joe McPhee chronology
Linear B (1990)	Élan Impulse (1991)	Impressions of Jimmy Giuffre (1980)

Élan Impulse is a live duet album by multi-instrumentalist and composer Joe McPhee and Danuik Lazro, recorded in 1991 and released on the French In Situ label.

== Reception ==
Professional ratings
Review scores
Source	Rating
Allmusic	4/5 stars

Reviewer Thom Jurek on Allmusic said "This duo digs deep into the spirit of a particular night in France and calls out of it the entire improvisational tradition from Duke Ellington (whose "Come Sunday" is featured here) to Steve Lacy (whose "Pearl Street" is played movingly) and the host of time periods in between... This is an astonishing record. Period".

== Track listing ==
All compositions by Joe McPhee and Danuik Lazro except as indicated

1. "Reason I" - 7:47
2. "Logic Circles" - 7:44
3. "Pearl Street" (Steve Lacy) - 8:53
4. "Sand Dancer" - 2:19
5. "Come Sunday" (Duke Ellington) - 7:49
6. "Reason II" - 5:03
7. "Joker" - 7:23
8. "Cordered" - 3:44
9. "Reason III" - 6:20
10. "Arcs" - 4:50

== Personnel ==
- Joe McPhee - tenor saxophone, soprano saxophone, valve trombone, voice
- Daunik Lazro - alto saxophone, baritone saxophone
