= Change (Andrew Hill album) =

Studio album by Andrew Hill
- Released: June 5, 2007
- Recorded: March 7, 1966
- Studio: Van Gelder Studio, Englewood Cliffs, NJ
- Genre: Jazz
- Length: 55:30
- Label: Blue Note; Blue Note 85190
- Producer: Alfred Lion

Andrew Hill chronology
Compulsion!!!!! (1966)	Change (2007)	Grass Roots (1968)

Change is a studio album by American jazz pianist Andrew Hill featuring performances recorded in 1966 for the Blue Note label. The album had a complicated release history- it was originally scheduled for issuance in 1967 as BST 84233, but was held back from release until 1975, when the tracks appeared under saxophonist Sam Rivers' name, as part of a double LP set called Involution, which combined them with tracks recorded under Rivers' leadership (which would eventually see release as Dimensions & Extensions). The first release of this material under Hill's name did not occur until 1995 as part of the Mosaic box set The Complete Blue Note Andrew Hill Sessions (1963-66). The album features Hill with Rivers, bassist Walter Booker and drummer J.C. Moses performing six of his originals. In 2007, two alternate takes (previously included in the Mosaic set) were added to the CD release. The shorter take of "Violence" was initially chosen as the master track for that piece.

== Reception ==
The Allmusic review by Thom Jurek awarded the album 4 stars stating "This band plays outside, but this is not "free jazz" in the original sense of the term. In fact, it is music that is composed, with lots of room for improvisation... It's a shame this ensemble didn't get to record together more, because by album's end it feels like they're just getting started".

Professional ratings
Review scores
Source	Rating
Allmusic	4/5 stars
The Penguin Guide to Jazz Recordings	3.5/4 stars

== Track listing ==
All compositions by Andrew Hill

1. "Violence" - 11:06
2. "Pain" - 3:53
3. "Illusion" - 5:54
4. "Hope" - 7:17
5. "Lust" - 5:16
6. "Desire" - 6:33
7. "Violence" [alternate take] - 7:01 Bonus track on CD reissue
8. "Desire" [alternate take] - 8:30 Bonus track on CD reissue

== Personnel ==
- Andrew Hill - piano, harpsichord
- Sam Rivers - tenor saxophone
- Walter Booker - bass
- J. C. Moses - drums
