= An Evening with Ornette Coleman =

Live album by Ornette Coleman
- Released: 1967
- Recorded: August 29, 1965
- Venues: Fairfield Halls, Croydon, London
- Genre: Free jazz
- Labels: Polydor International; 623 246/247
- Producer: Alan Bates

An Evening with Ornette Coleman is a live album by Ornette Coleman. It was recorded in August 1965 at Fairfield Halls in Croydon, London, and was initially released by Polydor International in 1967. The album opens with a recording of a wind quintet by Coleman performed by London's Virtuoso Ensemble, followed by trio performances featuring Coleman on alto saxophone, violin, and trumpet, accompanied by bassist David Izenzon and drummer Charles Moffett.

The album was reissued by Freedom Records, a subsidiary of Black Lion Records, in 1972 with the title Ornette Coleman In Europe Volumes I & II, and was reissued again by Arista Records in 1975 as The Great London Concert. In 2008, the FreeFactory label reissued the album on CD under the name Croydon Concert. The wind quintet, titled "Sounds and Forms" on the Polydor and Freedom releases, and "Forms and Sounds" on the Arista and FreeFactory releases, would be heard in modified form on the album The Music of Ornette Coleman, recorded in March 1967 and released by RCA that same year.

== Background ==
The concert that appears on the recording was presented as part of the Live New Departures series and was organized by Victor Schonfield, Pete Brown, and Michael Horovitz. Prior to the event, the London Musicians' Union, which placed reciprocal quotas on foreign musicians, informed Coleman that the quota for jazz musicians was full, while the one for classical musicians was not. In response, Coleman quickly composed "Sounds and Forms for Wind Quintet," becoming the UK's first African American "concert artist." Izenzon and Moffett arrived from New York in order to participate in the remaining pieces.

The concert, which began with a poetry reading by Horovitz, accompanied by local musicians, was marked by a number of unusual occurrences. During the performance of Coleman's ten-movement wind quintet, the audience applauded after each movement rather than waiting until the end of the last movement, to the amusement of the musicians. In addition, during a silent moment in the trio's set, an audience member shouted "Now play Cherokee!", referring to the jazz standard. According to Horovitz, Coleman, in response, "instantly whizzed into an immaculately faithful version, whose lightning variations prompted the first of the evening's extensive series of standing ovations. He said later: 'I just wanted them to know I knew.'"

== Reception ==
Professional ratings
Review scores
Source	Rating
AllMusic	4/5 stars
The Rolling Stone Jazz Record Guide	5/5 stars

In a review for AllMusic, Brian Olewnick wrote: "this live concert captures Coleman in a transitional period that found him experimenting with contemporary classical forms as well as making more frequent use of the violin and trumpet. In many ways, it can be heard as an extension of the ideas first encountered on the ESP Town Hall Concert recording... there's an extremely refreshing freedom in his approach, one that strongly underlines his contention that innate musical ability trumps technique. An Evening with Ornette Coleman is a wonderful recording and should command a place in the collection of any serious fan of this great musician."

== Track listing ==
All compositions by Ornette Coleman.

1. "Sounds and Forms for Wind Quintet - Movements 1-10" – 24:48 (also listed as "Forms and Sounds" on some releases)
2. "Sadness" – 3:33
3. "Clergyman's Dream" – 12:15
4. "Falling Stars" – 8:54
5. "Silence" – 9:13
6. "Happy Fool" – 7:11
7. "Ballad" – 5:19
8. "Doughnuts" – 6:10

== Personnel ==
- Ornette Coleman – saxophone, trumpet, violin (tracks 2–8)
- David Izenzon – bass (tracks 2–8)
- Charles Moffett – drums (tracks 2–8)
- Edward Walker – flute (track 1)
- Sidney Fell – clarinet (track 1)
- Derek Wickers – oboe (track 1)
- John Burden – English horn (track 1)
- Cecil James – bassoon (track 1)
