= Chappaqua Suite =

1965 studio album by Ornette Coleman

Studio album by Ornette Coleman
- Released: 1966
- Recorded: June 15–17, 1965
- Genre: Free jazz
- Length: 80:11
- Label: Columbia
- Producer: Henri Renaud

Ornette Coleman chronology
Town Hall, 1962 (1965)	Chappaqua Suite (1966)	At the Golden Circle Stockholm (1966)

Chappaqua Suite is a free jazz album by alto saxophonist Ornette Coleman which was recorded in 1965 for Columbia Records.

It was originally commissioned by director Conrad Rooks as the soundtrack to his film Chappaqua; however, the music was not used in the released version of the film because Rooks decided upon hearing Coleman's music that its inherent beauty might detract from the force of the film.

== Reception ==
Professional ratings
Review scores
Source	Rating
AllMusic	3.5/5 stars
The Penguin Guide to Jazz Recordings	3/4 stars

The AllMusic review by Thom Jurek stated: "While not considered a masterwork of Coleman's, perhaps because of its unavailability in the United States in its entirety, Chappaqua Suite is a testament to Coleman's vision as a composer and the power of his orchestral direction. Very worthwhile indeed". A writer for Eartrip magazine described the nature of Coleman's playing on the album: "the unfolding of ideas on a similar plane is not about building up to emotional climaxes, [...] but about the constant stream of ideas within particular parameters which are open to change but which are not under the force of having to change."

== Track listing ==
1. "Chappaqua Suite, Part 1" – 21:06
2. "Chappaqua Suite, Part 2" – 18:41
3. "Chappaqua Suite, Part 3" – 17:36
4. "Chappaqua Suite, Part 4" – 21:48

All compositions by Ornette Coleman

== Personnel ==
- Ornette Coleman – alto saxophone
- Pharoah Sanders – tenor saxophone
- David Izenzon – double bass
- Charles Moffett – drums
- Orchestra arranged by Joseph Tekula
