= Tempranillo (album) =

Studio album by Evan Parker, Agustí Fernández
- Released: 1996
- Recorded: November 27, 1995
- Studio: Estudi 84, Barcelona
- Genre: Jazz
- Length: 45:38
- Label: Nova Era
- Producer: Agustí Fernández

Evan Parker chronology
McPhee/Parker/Lazro (1996)	Tempranillo (1996)	Chicago Solo (1997)

Tempranillo is an album by British jazz saxophonist Evan Parker and Spanish pianist Agustí Fernández, which was recorded in 1995 and released on the Spanish Nova Era label. They had never played together before.

== Reception ==
Professional ratings
Review scores
Source	Rating
AllMusic	4.5/5 stars
The Penguin Guide to Jazz	3/4 stars

In his review for AllMusic, Thom Jurek says that the record "is one of those magical dates where everything that happens does so for a reason, and the result clarifies the process without much effort."

The Penguin Guide to Jazz says about the pianist that "At moments, he sounds as if be might be playing scores pieces by Xenakis or Stockhausen; at others, some passionate folk theme seems about to announce itself. Parker goes about his music with the same intensity as ever, listening, responding, interpolating new ideas."

== Track listing ==
All compositions by Parker/Fernández

1. "Part I (Mercerioso)" – 6:00
2. "Part II" – 7:58
3. "Part III" – 7:05
4. "Part IV (31 Davids)" – 5:35
5. "Part V" – 5:19
6. "Part VI" – 6:38
7. "Part VII" – 5:47
8. "Part VIII (Nana for Núria)" – 3:16

== Personnel ==
- Evan Parker – soprano sax, tenor sax
- Agustí Fernández – piano
