= Common Threads (album) =

Live album by Joe McPhee Quintet
- Released: 1996
- Recorded: October 19, 1995
- Venue: Tractor Tavern (Seattle)
- Genre: Jazz
- Length: 59:18
- Label: Deep Listening DL4
- Producer: Joe McPhee

Joe McPhee chronology
McPhee/Parker/Lazro (1995)	Common Threads (1996)	A Meeting in Chicago (1996)

Common Threads: Live at the Tractor Tavern, Seattle is a live album by multi-instrumentalist and composer Joe McPhee recorded in 1995 and first released on the Deep Listening label.

== Reception ==
Professional ratings
Review scores
Source	Rating
Allmusic	4.5/5 stars
The Penguin Guide to Jazz Recordings	4/4 stars

Allmusic reviewer Thom Jurek states "the quintet creates a spacious yet wonderfully murky chamber music, utilizing timbre as its force for forward momentum. The three-string instruments are given free rein to cover or open spaces inside this mode and create intervals of their own for McPhee and S. Dempster. They create textures in space by employing timbral chromatics of timbre and tonal extension and contraction to achieve their aims".

== Track listing ==
All compositions by Joe McPhee

1. "Spirit Traveler (For Don Cherry)" – 47:30
2. "Michael's Cipher" – 4:04
3. "Red Enchantment (For Joe McPhee, Sr.)" – 7:39

== Personnel ==
- Joe McPhee – pocket trumpet, tenor saxophone, soprano saxophone
- Stuart Dempster – trombone, didjeridu, little instruments
- Eyvind Kang – violin, erhu
- Loren Dempster – cello
- Michael Bisio – bass
