= Inside Out (Joe McPhee album) =

Studio album by Joe McPhee and David Prentice
- Released: 1996
- Recorded: June 1 & 2, 1996 at The Spirit Room in Rossie, New York.
- Genre: Jazz
- Length: 53:05
- Label: CIMP CIMP 120
- Producer: Robert D. Rusch

Joe McPhee chronology
Legend Street Two (1996)	Inside Out (1996)	Finger Wigglers (1996)

Inside Out is an album by multi-instrumentalist and composer Joe McPhee with violinist David Prentice, recorded in 1996 and released on the CIMP label.

== Reception ==
Professional ratings
Review scores
Source	Rating
AllMusic	2.5/5 stars
The Penguin Guide to Jazz Recordings	3.5/4 stars

AllMusic reviewer Thom Jurek states: "Of all the Joe McPhee duet recordings, this one is by far the most visionary, moving, and inspired musically and spiritually. ...there is sense about these pieces that the nature of freely improvised music is a process of unfolding oneself -- making oneself available not only to the spirit of the music, but also completely open to the other".

== Track listing ==
All compositions by Joe McPhee

1. "Haiku Part 1: Dawn" - 3:07
2. "Haiku Part 2: The Centipede" - 3:36
3. "Haiku Part 3: The Edge of Wetness" - 4:21
4. "It Sings" - 5:29
5. "The Garden: Part 1" - 3:02
6. "The Garden: Part 2" - 2:28
7. "The Garden: Part 3" - 4:40
8. "Conference With the Birds: Part 1" - 5:15
9. "Conference With the Birds: Part 2" - 6:07
10. "Dusk" - 8:20
11. "Drops" - 9:53

== Personnel ==
- Joe McPhee - trumpet, tenor saxophone, alto saxophone, soprano saxophone, gong
- David Prentice - violin, Jew's harp
