= Legend Street One =

Studio album by Joe McPhee Quintet
- Released: 1996
- Recorded: June 1 & 2, 1996 at The Spirit Room in Rossie, New York.
- Genre: Jazz
- Length: 53:05
- Label: CIMP CIMP 115
- Producer: Robert D. Rusch

Joe McPhee chronology
As Serious As Your Life (1996)	Legend Street One (1996)	Legend Street Two (1996)

Legend Street One is an album by multi-instrumentalist and composer Joe McPhee recorded in 1996 and first released on the CIMP label.

== Reception ==
Professional ratings
Review scores
Source	Rating
Allmusic	4/5 stars
The Penguin Guide to Jazz Recordings	4/4 stars

Allmusic reviewer Thom Jurek states "the current forms are transmuted, offering glimpses of the newer tonal frontiers he has encountered, but the sonorities aside, the feeling of the music remains, with a similar emphasis placed on timbres that highlight rather than consume either a melodic line or an improvisation".

== Track listing ==
All compositions by Joe McPhee except as indicated

1. "Loweville" (Frank Lowe, Joe McPhee) - 2:12
2. "What We Do" - 7:11
3. "Memorium" - 5:33
4. "For Panama, Parts 1-2" (Charles Moffett) - 7:42
5. "Up, Over, and Out" - 9:15
6. "July the 13th" - 5:21
7. "Not Yet" - 6:04
8. "Trading Space" - 9:40

== Personnel ==
- Joe McPhee - pocket trumpet, tenor saxophone, alto saxophone, flugelhorn
- Frank Lowe - tenor saxophone
- David Prentice - violin
- Charles Moffett - drums
