= Marzette Watts and Company =

Studio album by Marzette Watts
- Released: 1968
- Recorded: December 8, 1966
- Studio: New York City
- Genre: Free jazz
- Length: 33:39
- Label: ESP-Disk; 1044

Marzette Watts chronology
Marzette Watts and Company (1968)	The Marzette Watts Ensemble (1969)

Marzette Watts and Company, also known as Marzette and Company, is the debut album by saxophonist and composer Marzette Watts. It was recorded in December 1966 in New York City, and was released by ESP-Disk in 1968. On the album, Watts is joined by saxophonist, flutist, and bass clarinetist Byard Lancaster, cornetist and trombonist Clifford Thornton, guitarist Sonny Sharrock, vibraphonist Karl Berger, bassists Henry Grimes and Juney Booth, and drummer J. C. Moses. The album, which was reissued by ESP-Disk in 2012, was recorded under the supervision of Clifford Thornton.

ESP-Disk owner Bernard Stollman stated that he initially knew Watts as an independent engineer who had his own recording studio. He recalled: "When I visited his apartment on Cooper Square, he had a few small paintings on the wall. I didn't know at the time that he had studied at the Sorbonne. He said, 'Bernard, I'm going to do an album.' 'Yourself? Are you a musician?' 'Yes,' he said, 'I taught myself.' He had such aplomb, that when he said something it wasn't halfway. I said, 'All right, Marzette, you will do an album.'"

Watts would go on to record only one additional album, The Marzette Watts Ensemble, recorded in 1968 and released by Savoy Records in 1969.

== Reception ==
Professional ratings
Review scores
Source	Rating
AllMusic	4/5 stars
PopMatters	7/10 stars
Tom Hull – on the Web	B+

In a review for AllMusic, Rob Ferrier wrote: "Like many an album on the ESP label, this one takes work to enjoy... Those into the time and place (i.e., New York in the mid-'60s) can't get enough of this stuff and are sure to enjoy this too. For others with open ears, this is a peek into a chapter of American music that is still criminally underappreciated."

John Garratt, writing for PopMatters, stated: "Marzette Watts was caught in the very middle of the civil unrest of 1960s America.... Watts struggled to belong somewhere. The music of Marzette Watts & Company reflects this turmoil and the list of soon-to-be-famous names accompanying him on the album suggests that misery loved company... Half these musicians have passed on, but their 'Backdrop for Urban Revolution' continues to stay in motion, thanks to gut-punching artifacts like this one."

Writing for Elsewhere, Graham Reid commented: "Astute observers will note the paralleling to some extent of Ornette Coleman's double-quintet line-up from Free Jazz, but also the inclusion of Sharrock, an incendiary player whose staccato firepower would go on to become a cornerstone of many free jazz albums. That black politics was in the forefront of Watts' thinking is evidenced by the 20 minute 'Backdrop for Urban Revolution', an occasionally explosive piece -- especially when Sharrock starts tossing out shards of sounds which sound like storefront windows breaking."

Writer Raul Da Gama remarked: "It takes but one listening of his path-breaking album Marzette Watts & Company and it becomes patently clear that here is a musician gifted in both the aural and spectrally visual nature of music. In other words, Mr. Watts could paint pictures as he set aspects of his experiences to music... This is a marvelous record and ought to be enshrined in a place where historic recording are not only stored but listened to and taught for others to have a sense of history that the men and women of the 60's created."

In a review for Offbeat, David Kunian commented: "Here, some of the lesser-known players of the avant-garde perform some great music together. Instead of all-out improvs, there are compositions with great dialogues and harmonies between certain instruments, while others add accents or textures."

Guitarist Thurston Moore referred to the album as "one of the heaviest ESP-disk recordings."

== Track listing ==
All compositions by Marzette Watts.

1. "Backdrop For Urban Revolution" – 19:18
2. "Ia" – 10:10
3. "Geno" – 7:34

== Personnel ==
- Marzette Watts – tenor saxophone, soprano saxophone, bass clarinet
- Byard Lancaster – alto saxophone, flute, bass clarinet
- Clifford Thornton – cornet, trombone
- Karl Berger – vibraphone
- Sonny Sharrock – guitar
- Henry Grimes – bass
- Juney Booth – bass
- J. C. Moses – drums
