= Paul Jeffrey =

American jazz saxophonist, arranger, and educator (1933–2015)

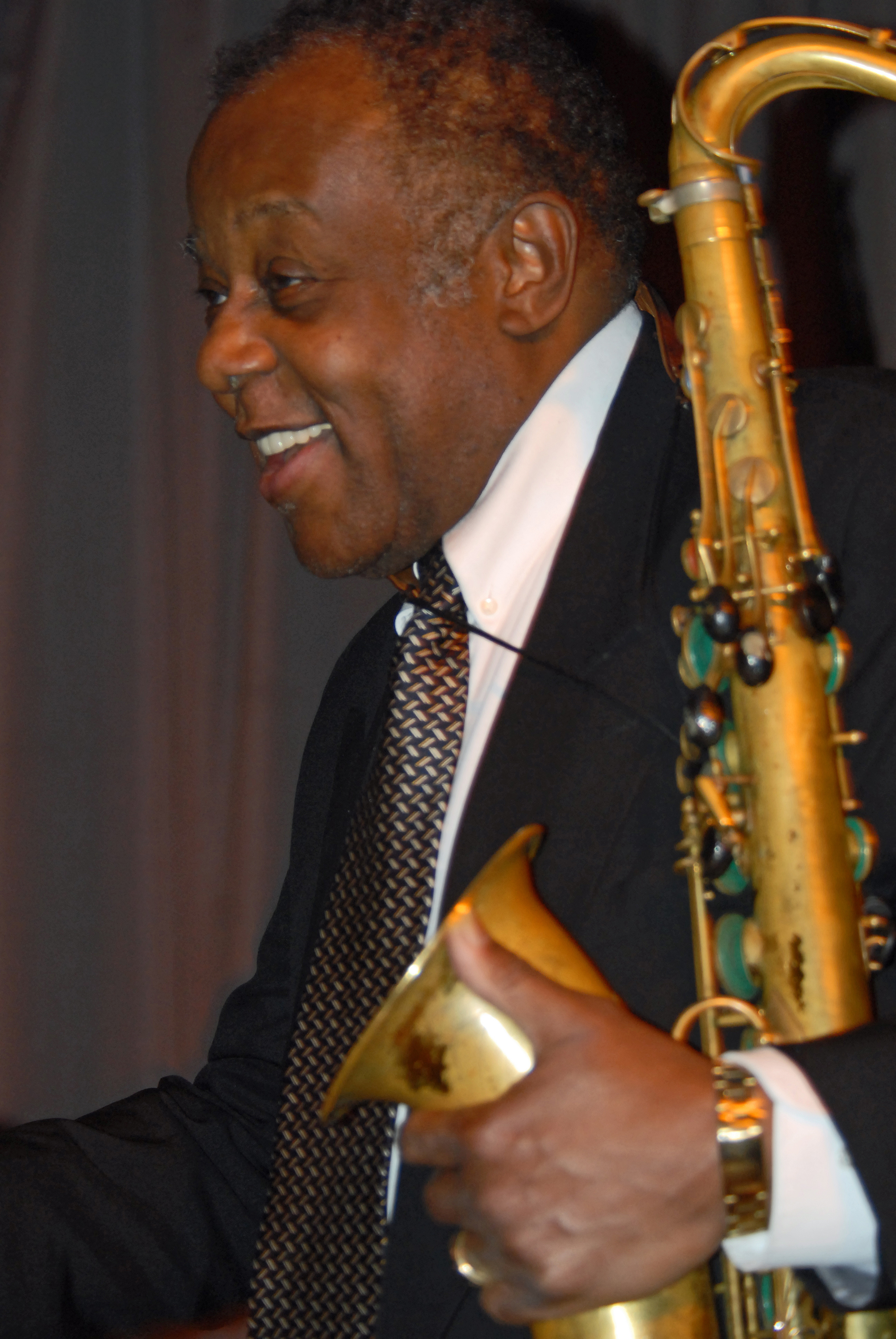

Background information
- Born: April 8, 1933
- Origin: New York City, New York, U.S.
- Died: March 20, 2015 (aged 81)
- Genres: Jazz
- Occupations: Musician, arranger, and educator
- Instrument: Tenor saxophone

Paul Jeffrey (April 8, 1933 – March 20, 2015) was an American jazz tenor saxophonist, arranger, and educator. He was a member of Thelonious Monk's regular group from 1970–1975, and also worked extensively with other musicians such as Charles Mingus, Dizzy Gillespie, Clark Terry, Lionel Hampton and B.B. King.

== Biography ==
Born in New York City, Jeffrey attended Kingston High School. After graduating in 1951, he completed a Bachelor of Science degree in music education at Ithaca College in 1955. He spent the late 1950s touring with bands led by Illinois Jacquet, Elmo Hope, Big Maybelle, and Wynonie Harris. From 1960 to 1961, Jeffrey toured the US with B.B. King, after which he worked as a freelance musician in the New York City area and toured with bands led by Howard McGhee, Clark Terry, and Dizzy Gillespie.

Jeffrey's first studio work as a leader was in 1968, when he recorded the album Electrifying Sounds for Savoy Records. He toured with the Count Basie Orchestra before beginning his associations with Thelonious Monk and Charles Mingus. He first joined Monk's quartet for a multi-day run at the Frog & Nightgown club in Raleigh, North Carolina, in May 1970.

Jeffrey performed as a regular member of Monk's band throughout the remainder of Monk's public career, appearing with Monk throughout the US and Japan at the Village Vanguard, Lincoln Center’s Philharmonic Hall, the Jazz Workshop, Shelly's Manne-Hole, and The Cellar Door, among other venues. He was hired by George Wein to organize a 15-piece band for a tribute concert to Monk at Carnegie Hall in 1974; a concert at which Monk made a surprise appearance, replacing Barry Harris on the piano just as the concert was starting.

In the 1970s, Jeffrey served on the music faculties at the University of Hartford, Rutgers University (where future composer Kenneth Lampl was one of his students), Jersey City State College along with leading his own Octet consisting of Paul (Tenor Saxophone), Alex Foster (Alto Saxophone), Sam Burtis (Trombone), Artie Simmons (Trombone), Oliver Beaner (Trumpet), Jim Roberts (Piano), Mattifias Pierson (Bass) and Chuck Zeuren (Drums).

In 1972, Jeffrey recorded “Watershed” on Mainstream Records. The band members were Paul Jeffrey on tenor sax, Thelonious Monk Jr. on drums, Richard Davis on acoustic bass, and Jack Wilkins on electric guitar. It was released in 1973.

In 1983, Jeffrey joined Duke University as Artist in Residence and Director of Jazz Studies, positions he held until he retired and became Professor Emeritus in 2003.

In 2009, Jeffrey recorded a tribute to Thelonious Monk with the French label Imago records distributed by Orkhestra International, with Alessandro Collina on piano, Sebastien Adnot on bass and Laurent Sarrien on drums.

He died in North Carolina after a lengthy illness, aged 81.

== Discography ==
=== As leader ===
- 1968: Electrifying Sounds of the Paul Jeffrey Quintet | Savoy Records with Jimmy Owens (tpt), George Cables (p), Larry Ridley (b), and Billy Hart (d)
- 1972: Family | Mainstream records with George Cables (p), Stuart Butterfield (fr h), Joe Gardner (tpt), Hamiet Bluiett (bar), J.C. Williams (b cl), Bob Stewart (tuba), Wilbur Ware (b), Stanley Clarke (b), and T.S. Monk. (d)
- 1973: Watershed | Mainstream records with Jack Wilkins (eg), Richard Davis (b), and T.S. Monk. (d)
- 1974: Paul Jeffrey | Mainstream records with Jay Migliori (bar), Bill Green (bar), Blue Mitchell (t), David Walker (g), George Walker (g), George Wright (g), Darrell Clayborn (g), Joe Sample (p), Charles Kynard (org), Chuck Rainey (eb), and Raymond Pounds (d) Jay Migliori (bar), George Walker (g), King Errisson, Chino Valdes (cga), Emil Radocchia, Bob Zimmitti (per)
- 1981: Music Of The Masters Past And Present (Paul Jeffrey) | R.J.E./P.J. Records with Thomas Chapin (f, ss, as), Joshua Harris (f, ts), Andrew Beals (ss, as), Peter Belasco, Adam Brenner (as), Peter Furlan, Clay Jackson, Clifford Jordan, Joseph Little, Jerry Weldon (ts), Philip Nostrand, David Schumacher, Ben Thomason (bar), Robert Panell (tb), Lance Smith (g), Harry Pickens (p, ep), Alan Watson (p), Jerry D'Anna, Paul D'Loia (b), Hank Skalkin (eb), Carl Adkins, Philip Cuneff (d), Paul Jeffrey (con)
- 1994: Tribute To Trane (Paul Jeffrey) | Duke University Jazz CD with Todd Bashore (as), Jeb Patton (p), John Simonetti (b), Michael Scott (d)
- 1997: Together In Monaco (Paul Jeffrey & Curtis Fuller) | Amosaya with Charles Vaudano (t), Curtis Fuller (tb), Jeb Patton (p), Marc Abrams (b), Washington Duke (d), Marcelo Tonolo (p), Calvin Jones (b), Michael Scott (d)
- 2009: We See (Paul Jeffrey Quartet) | Imago records with Alessandro Collina (p), Seb Adnot (b), Laurent Sarrien (d)

=== As sideman ===
With Sam Rivers

- 1994: Crystals

With Charles Moffett

- The Gift (Savoy, 1969)

With Thelonious Monk

- 1970: Monk in Tokyo (Thelonious Monk Quartet) | Fuji-TV recording, Sankei Hall, Tokyo with Thelonious Monk (p); Larry Ridley (b); Lenny McBrowne (d)
- 1970: Monk in Tokyo (Thelonious Monk Quartet) | Far East, Concert, Koseinenkin Hall, Tokyo with Thelonious Monk (p); Larry Ridley (b); Lenny McBrowne (d)
- 1971: Thelonious Monk Quartet | NET-TV recording, NYC with Thelonious Monk (p); Larry Ridley (b); TS Monk Jr (d)
- 1972 & 1975: The Last Concerts: Lincoln Center 1975 Village Vanguard 1972 (Thelonious Monk Quartet) | Rare Live Recordings, Village Vanguard, NYC with Thelonious Monk (p); Ron McClure (b); TS Monk Jr (d)
- 1972: Thelonious Monk Quartet | Unidentified recording, Village Vanguard, NYC with Thelonious Monk (p); Dave Holland (b); TS Monk Jr (d)
- 1975: Thelonious Monk Quartet | Newport in New York, Concert, Philharmonic Hall, NYC (Thursday July 3, 1975)
