= Chicago Solo =

Studio album by Evan Parker
- Released: 1997
- Recorded: November 18, 1995
- Studio: Airwave Studios, Chicago
- Genre: Jazz
- Length: 59:20
- Label: Okka Disk
- Producer: Evan Parker, John Corbett

Evan Parker chronology
Tempranillo (1996)	Chicago Solo (1997)	London Air Lift (1997)

Chicago Solo is an album by the British jazz saxophonist Evan Parker, recorded in 1995 and released on Okka Disk. After eight records of solo soprano saxophone, it was his first unaccompanied tenor sax record.

== Reception ==
Professional ratings
Review scores
Source	Rating
AllMusic	4.5/5 stars
The Penguin Guide to Jazz	4/4 stars

In his review for AllMusic, Thom Jurek states: "This is a fascinating and very listening disc of solo improvisations, one that is likely never to find a wide enough audience for its brilliant accomplishment on tenor saxophone."

The Penguin Guide to Jazz describes the results of his first full programme of tenor playing as "extraordinary, music of intense focus and a fearsome weight and intensity of tone."

== Track listing ==
All compositions by Evan Parker

1. "Chicago Solo [12]" – 1:44
2. "Chicago Solo [3]" – 4:40
3. "Chicago Solo [4] for Chris McGregor" – 3:18
4. "Chicago Solo [5]" – 6:56
5. "Chicago Solo [6]" – 3:20
6. "Chicago Solo [7]" – 5:13
7. "Chicago Solo [8] for Lee Konitz" – 2:57
8. "Chicago Solo [9]" – 2:15
9. "Chicago Solo [10]" – 4:46
10. "Chicago Solo [11] for Mr. Braxton" – 1:44
11. "Chicago Solo [13]" – 4:04
12. "Chicago Solo [14]" – 5:26
13. "Chicago Solo [15]" – 4:23
14. "Chicago Solo [16] for George Lewis" – 8:34

== Personnel ==
- Evan Parker – tenor sax
