= The House I Live In (album) =

Live album by Archie Shepp and Lars Gullin
- Released: 1980
- Recorded: November 21, 1963
- Venue: Jazzhus Montmartre, Copenhagen, Denmark
- Genre: Jazz
- Length: 48:37
- Label: Steeplechase
- Producer: Nils Winther

Archie Shepp chronology
Archie Shepp & the New York Contemporary Five (1963)	The House I Live In (1980)	Bill Dixon 7-tette/Archie Shepp and the New York Contemporary 5 (1964)

Lars Gullin chronology
Lars Gullin Vol. 4 (1963)	The House I Live In (1963)	Lars Gullin with Strings (1964)

Professional ratings
Review scores
Source	Rating
Allmusic	4/5 stars
The Penguin Guide to Jazz Recordings	3/4 stars

The House I Live In is a live album featuring saxophonists Archie Shepp and Lars Gullin recorded at the Jazzhus Montmartre in Copenhagen, Denmark on November 21, 1963 and released on the Steeplechase label in 1980.

== Reception ==
The Allmusic review by Scott Yanow calls the album "a fascinating [and] important historical release".

== Track listing ==
1. "You Stepped Out of a Dream" (Nacio Herb Brown, Gus Kahn) - 19:06
2. "I Should Care" (Sammy Cahn, Axel Stordahl, Paul Weston) - 9:00
3. "The House I Live In" (Earl Robinson) - 9:09
4. "Sweet Georgia Brown" (Ben Bernie, Kenneth Casey, Maceo Pinkard) - 11:22

Recorded in Copenhagen, Denmark on November 21, 1963.

== Personnel ==
- Archie Shepp - tenor saxophone
- Lars Gullin - baritone saxophone
- Tete Montoliu - piano
- Niels-Henning Ørsted Pedersen - bass
- Alex Riel - drums
