= Bill Dixon 7-tette/Archie Shepp and the New York Contemporary 5 =

Studio album by Bill Dixon/New York Contemporary Five
- Released: 1964
- Recorded: February 5 & March 4, 1964
- Genre: Jazz
- Label: Savoy
- Producer: Archie Shepp, Bill Dixon

Archie Shepp chronology
The House I Live In (1963)	Bill Dixon 7-tette/Archie Shepp and the New York Contemporary 5 (1964)	Four for Trane (1964)

Bill Dixon chronology
Archie Shepp - Bill Dixon Quartet (1963)	Bill Dixon 7-tette/Archie Shepp and the New York Contemporary 5 (1964)	Intents and Purposes (1966)

Bill Dixon 7-tette/Archie Shepp and the New York Contemporary 5 is an album released on the Savoy label originally featuring one LP side by Bill Dixon's septet and one LP side by the New York Contemporary Five featuring saxophonist Archie Shepp. The album resulted from Dixon and Shepp's contractual obligations to provide Savoy Records with a second album after the Archie Shepp - Bill Dixon Quartet (1963) but following a professional separation.

== Reception ==
Professional ratings
Review scores
Source	Rating
AllMusic	3/5 stars
The Penguin Guide to Jazz Recordings	3/4 stars

The authors of The Penguin Guide to Jazz described Dixon's five-part "Winter Song 1964" as "a gently flowing, semi-abstract suite of ideas that are reminiscent in places of some of Mingus's late '50s pieces, but marked throughout by Dixon's melancholy lyricism and fine sense of structure."

LeRoi Jones wrote that the B side of the album "really contains some serious business... Archie [Shepp] sounds lovely throughout the entire date... He combines a big wide elegant bluesiness with a rhythmic force that often has people trying to connect him with Ben Webster... which is no bad connection... But Archie has something to say which is new and powerfully moving. John Tchicai makes music of a very different nature than Shepp's, but it is also a very moving music. Tchicai's playing, his approach to the horn, really fascinates me. His tone is dry, acrid, incisive; his line spare and lean, like himself; and his phrasing at times reminds one of Mondrian's geometrical decisions, or lyrical syllogisms. Where Shepp's intentions are usually immediately apparent, sweety or nasty blues, though of a very wild contemporary persuasion, Tchicai's ear leads him into subtleties of expression where the 'pure' blues feeling is replaced by a constantly complicating musical/emotional tension which is 'soulful' because the player has a great deal of soul."

Ekkehard Jost wrote that the two Shepp compositions performed by the NYCF on the B side ("Where Poppies Bloom (Where Poppies Blow)" and "Like a Blessed Baby Lamb") "show that [Shepp's] compositional conception is by no means static... [the pieces] are marked by polyphonic voicings in the ensemble passages, by changes of tempo and rhythm, and by dynamic differentiation. Without being in any way imitative, they contain echoes of Ellington and Mingus, overlaid on one side by the tonally disoriented sound of the Cecil Taylor groups... and on the other, by a coarse folksiness, a quality also occasionally present in later Shepp compositions."

== Track listing ==
1. "Winter Song 1964: Section I, Letters A, B, C, D" (Bill Dixon) - 1:30
2. "Winter Song 1964: Section II, Letter E" (Dixon) - 0:47
3. "Winter Song 1964: Section III, Letter F" (Dixon) - 9:17
4. "Winter Song 1964: Section IV, Letter G" (Dixon) - 0:46
5. "Winter Song 1964: Section V, Letter H Played Three Times" (Dixon) - 1:49
6. "Coda" (Dixon) - 0:31
7. "The 12th December" (Dixon) - 3:20
8. "Winter Song 1964: Section III, Letter F" [alternate take] (Dixon) - 7:25 Bonus track on CD reissue
9. "Winter Song 1964: Section III, Letter F" [alternate study] (Dixon) - 9:46 Bonus track on CD reissue
10. "Where Poppies Bloom (Where Poppies Blow)" (Archie Shepp) - 7:47
11. "Like a Blessed Baby Lamb" (Shepp) - 9:27
12. "Consequences" (Don Cherry) - 4:55

Recorded at Savoy Studios, Newark on March 4, 1964 (tracks 1–9) and New York City on February 5, 1964 (tracks 10–12).

== Personnel ==
Side A

- Bill Dixon: trumpet (tracks 1–9)
- Ken McIntyre: alto saxophone, oboe (tracks 1–9)
- George Barrow: tenor saxophone (tracks 1–9)
- Howard Johnson: tuba, baritone saxophone (tracks 1–9)
- David Izenzon: bass (tracks 1–9)
- Hal Dodson: bass (tracks 1–9)
- Howard McRae: drums (tracks 1–9)

Side B

- Archie Shepp: tenor saxophone (tracks 10–12)
- John Tchicai: alto saxophone (tracks 10–12)
- Ted Curson: trumpet (tracks 10 & 11)
- Don Cherry: trumpet (track 12)
- Ronnie Boykins: bass (tracks 10–12)
- Sunny Murray: drums (tracks 10–12)
