= Fire Music (Archie Shepp album) =

Studio album by Archie Shepp
- Released: September 1965
- Recorded: February 16 and March 9, 1965
- Studio: Van Gelder Studio, Englewood Cliffs, NJ
- Genre: Jazz
- Length: 40:30
- Label: Impulse! A-86
- Producer: Bob Thiele

Archie Shepp chronology
Four for Trane (1964)	Fire Music (1965)	On This Night (1965)

Alternative cover

Fire Music is a studio album by jazz saxophonist Archie Shepp released on Impulse! Records in 1965. "Malcolm, Malcolm Semper Malcolm" is dedicated to Malcolm X, whilst "Los Olvidados" is a homage to the 1950 film of the same name. Featured musicians include trumpeter Ted Curson, trombonist Joe Orange, alto saxophonist Marion Brown, bassist Reggie Johnson and drummer Joe Chambers.

== Reception ==
Professional ratings
Review scores
Source	Rating
AllMusic	5/5 stars
Down Beat	4/5 stars
The Rolling Stone Jazz Record Guide	4/5 stars
The Penguin Guide to Jazz Recordings	3.5/4 stars

The AllMusic review by Scott Yanow states: "This particular early Archie Shepp recording has its strong moments, although it is a bit erratic... Overall, this set, even with its faults, is recommended".

Writing for All About Jazz, Robert Gilbert called Fire Music "an often-fascinating album, rich in compositional and improvisational prowess", and commented: "Shepp puts together a record that is both challenging and accessible to most listeners... Fire Music is an album that belongs in any serious jazz fan’s collection."

== Track listing ==
1. "Hambone" (Archie Shepp) – 12:29
2. "Los Olvidados" (Shepp) – 8:54
3. "Malcolm, Malcolm - Semper Malcolm" (Shepp) – 4:48
4. "Prelude to a Kiss" (Ellington, Gordon, Mills) – 4:50
5. "The Girl from Ipanema" (DeMoraes, Gimbel, Jobim) – 8:36
6. "Hambone" [Live] – 11:53 Bonus track on CD, recorded live at the Village Gate on March 28, 1965

== Personnel ==
- Archie Shepp – tenor saxophone, recitation on track 3
- Ted Curson – trumpet
- Joseph Orange – trombone
- Marion Brown – alto saxophone
- Reggie Johnson – double bass except track 3
- Joe Chambers – drums except track 3
- David Izenzon – double bass on track 3
- J.C. Moses – drums on track 3
