= Four for Trane =

Studio album by Archie Shepp
- Released: January 1965
- Recorded: August 10, 1964
- Studio: Van Gelder Studio, Englewood Cliffs, New Jersey
- Genre: Avant-garde jazz
- Length: 36:38
- Label: Impulse!
- Producer: John Coltrane; Bob Thiele

Archie Shepp chronology
Bill Dixon 7-tette/Archie Shepp and the New York Contemporary 5 (1964)	Four for Trane (1965)	Fire Music (1965)

Four for Trane is a studio album by tenor saxophonist Archie Shepp released on Impulse! Records in 1965. Four of the five tracks were composed and originally recorded by John Coltrane (released on his albums Giant Steps and Coltrane Plays the Blues) and rearranged by Shepp and trombonist Roswell Rudd. The other featured players are trumpeter Alan Shorter (brother of Wayne, here playing flugelhorn), alto saxophonist John Tchicai (Shepp’s fellow member of the New York Contemporary Five), bassist Reggie Workman and drummer Charles Moffett (who had worked extensively with Ornette Coleman). Coltrane himself co-produced the album alongside Bob Thiele. The album was Shepp's first release for Impulse!

== Background ==
According to Coltrane biographer Ashley Kahn, Four for Trane "was a direct result of Coltrane’s intervention, and his faith in the young tenor saxophonist from Philadelphia." Shepp recalled his efforts to get a recording date with Impulse!: "I had spent months trying to get Bob [Thiele] on the phone and he never answered the phone. Every time I'd call, his secretary, Lillian, whom I got to know very well, but at that point I hated her because she said, 'Well he's gone out to lunch,' or 'He's gone home and he's not coming back.' I was living in a fifth-floor walk-up and I'd save a dollar a day just to make ten calls. I'd run down and put a dime in the phone in the drugstore. This went on for months... So this one night I sat in with Trane at the Half Note. I got up enough courage to ask if he would intercede. So John gave me a look — the first time he really sort of looked at me in a very critical way, very questioning. He said, 'You know, a lot of people think I'm easy.' Then he took a very hard look at me. I said, 'Well, John, you can be sure I'm not trying to take advantage. I need this.' He knew I loved him. It wasn't about just trying to get off easy. So he looked at me and he says, 'Well, I'll see what I can do...' The next day I called Thiele's office and lo and behold the secretary says, 'Well, he's not in now but he will be back at three o'clock and he's waiting for your call.' So when I did talk to him, the first thing he said is, 'You guys are avant-garde. I know you're into your own thing. If you do this recording you're going to have to record all of John's music.' I had just been waiting for the chance to do that. I loved Trane's music and I had my own ideas about how to work with it. That became the Four for Trane date..."

Regarding the recording session, Shepp said: "When we did the Four for Trane date, it went down almost take by take, because we had rehearsed nightly for months. After the third song, Bob, who had been really terribly rude at the beginning, smoking his pipe like a chimney, he brightened up a bit, sat down and said, 'I've got to call John and tell him this stuff is great.' He said, 'John, you got to come out and hear this!' Well, Coltrane already knew. He had been listening to this stuff for the last couple of years because the avant-garde was all around New York... John was very gracious. He drove out from his home in Long Island to Englewood, at about eleven o'clock at night. I assumed he got out of his bed, because when we took that photo they put on the album cover [he was] with no socks, you know."

== Reception ==
Professional ratings
Review scores
Source	Rating
AllMusic	5/5 stars
Down Beat	4.5/5 stars
The Penguin Guide to Jazz Recordings	4/4 stars
The Rolling Stone Jazz Record Guide	5/5 stars

The Penguin Guide to Jazz selected this album as part of its suggested "Core Collection" calling it "one of the classic jazz albums of the '60s and a fascinating glimpse into how thoroughly different what was already thought of as the Coltrane revolution might sound." The AllMusic review by Thom Jurek states that "When it came to sheer exuberance and expression, [Shepp] was a force to be reckoned with in his youth, and it shows in each of the tunes recorded here. Four for Trane is a truly fine, original, and lasting album from an under-celebrated musician". Tom Terrell wrote: "Shepp and his crew of iconoclasts... took four of the master's best known tunes and made 'em new again." Robert Spencer wrote that Shepp's arrangements "succeed beautifully, not in restating Coltrane's work on these pieces, but making them something new... While Coltrane’s songs were widely thought of as empty platforms for blowing, Shepp shows here that they have the depth to stand a different treatment." Leroi Jones stated that "[t]his group that Shepp has gotten together for this date cannot fail to delight and inspire anyone really interested in moving human expression." He wrote: "the fact that this album is called Four for Trane demonstrates how much of an emotional allegiance Shepp feels he owes John Coltrane. But even with such acknowledged 'allegiance,' don't think for a moment that you're going to hear J.C. played back at you intact. Archie is so much his own self that it is finally impossible to name one influence as having been the guiding one... his range of expression is so broad that he seems to take in or to have digested most of the ways of playing tenor saxophone."

== Track listing ==
All compositions by John Coltrane, except where noted.

1. "Syeeda's Song Flute" – 8:30
2. "Mr. Syms" – 7:41
3. "Cousin Mary" – 7:14
4. "Naima" – 7:09
5. "Rufus (Swung His Face At Last To The Wind, Then His Neck Snapped)" (Shepp) – 6:24

== Personnel ==
- Archie Shepp – tenor saxophone
- Alan Shorter – flugelhorn
- John Tchicai – alto saxophone
- Roswell Rudd – trombone, arranger
- Reggie Workman – double bass
- Charles Moffett – drums
