= Charles Moffett =

American drummer (1929–1997)

- Born: September 6, 1929; Fort Worth, Texas, U.S.
- Died: February 14, 1997 (aged 67)
- Genre: Jazz
- Occupations: Musician, educator
- Instrument: Drum kit

Charles Moffett (September 6, 1929 – February 14, 1997) was an American free jazz drummer.

== Biography ==
Moffett was born in Fort Worth, Texas, where he attended I.M. Terrell High School with Ornette Coleman. Before switching to drums, Moffett began his musical career as a trumpeter. At the age of 13, he played trumpet with Jimmy Witherspoon, and later formed a band, the Jam Jivers, with fellow students Coleman and Prince Lasha. After switching to drums, Moffett briefly performed with Little Richard.

Moffett served in the United States Navy, after which he pursued boxing before studying music at Huston-Tillotson College in Austin. Moffett married in 1953 (Coleman was best man, and performed at the wedding), then began teaching music at a public school in Rosenberg, Texas

In 1961, Moffett moved to New York City to work with Ornette Coleman, but the saxophonist soon went into a brief retirement period. Moffett worked with Sonny Rollins, appeared on Archie Shepp's album Four for Trane, and led a group that included Pharoah Sanders and Carla Bley. When Coleman returned to performing in 1964, he formed a trio with Moffett and bassist David Izenzon. Moffett also performed on vibraphone.

Moffett began teaching music at New York Public Schools as a way to make ends meet when Coleman made only sporadic performances. Moffett taught at P.S. 58 (Carrol School) in Brooklyn and at P.S. 177 M (under the Manhattan Bridge and now defunct). He also taught at a Brooklyn High School. Moffett moved to Oakland, California, where he served as the city's music director, and was later the principal of the alternative Odyssey public school in Berkeley in the mid-1970s. The title of his first solo album The Gift is a reference to his love of teaching music. His then seven-year-old son Codaryl played drums on that album. Moffett later returned to Brooklyn, New York, and taught at P.S. 142 Stranahan Junior High School (Closed in 2006) and at P.S. 58 Carroll School.

His children are double bassist Charnett Moffett, drummer Codaryl "Cody" Moffett, vocalist Charisse Moffett, trumpeter Mondre Moffett, and saxophonist Charles Moffett, Jr.

== Discography ==
=== As leader ===
- 1969: The Gift (Savoy) with Paul Jeffrey, Wilbur Ware, Dennis O'Toole
- 1975: The Charles Moffett Family-Vol. 1 (LRS)
- Moffett & Sons (Sweet Basil/Apollon)

=== As sideman ===
With Ahmed Abdullah

- Ahmed Abdullah and the Solomonic Quintet (Silkheart, 1988)

with Ornette Coleman

- Town Hall 1962 (ESP Disk)
- Chappaqua Suite (CBS)
- An Evening with Ornette Coleman (Polydor International)
- The Paris Concert '65 (Magnetic)
- Live at the Tivoli '65 (Magnetic)
- At The Golden Circle, Stockholm Volumes One and Two (Blue Note)
- Who's Crazy? Vol. 1 & 2 (Jazz Atmosphere)
- Lonely Woman (BAT)

with Eric Dolphy

- Memorial Album (FM)

with Archie Shepp

- Four for Trane (Impulse!)

with Prince Lasha

- It Is Revealed (Zounds)
- Firebirds w/ Sonny Simmons (Contemporary)
- Firebirds Vol. 3 (Birdseye)

with Harold McNair

- Affectionate Fink (Island)

With Joe McPhee

- Legend Street One (CIMP, 1996)
- Legend Street Two (CIMP, 1996)

with the Charles Tyler Ensemble

- Charles Tyler Ensemble (ESP Disk)

with the Bob Thiele Emergency

- Head Start (Flying Dutchman)

with Frank Lowe

- Decision in Paradise (Soul Note)
- Bodies & Soul (CIMP)

with Sonny Simmons

- Ancient Ritual (Qwest/Reprise)
- Transcendence (CIMP)
- Judgement Day (CIMP)

with Keshavan Maslak

- Blaster Master (BlackSaint)
- Big Time (Daybreak)

with Kenny Millions

- Brother Charles (Hum Ha)
- Masking Tape Music (Hum Ha)
