= Town Hall, 1962 =

Live album by Ornette Coleman
- Released: 1965
- Recorded: December 21, 1962
- Venue: Town Hall, NYC
- Genre: Free jazz; avant-garde jazz
- Length: 45:14
- Label: ESP-Disk

Ornette Coleman chronology
Ornette on Tenor (1962)	Town Hall, 1962 (1965)	Chappaqua Suite (1966)

Town Hall, 1962 is a live album by Ornette Coleman, recorded on December 21, 1962 at New York City's Town Hall and released in 1965 by the ESP-Disk label. It was the first recording of Coleman's new trio, featuring rhythm section David Izenzon and Charles Moffett.

== Background ==
1962 was a difficult year for finding work for Coleman and his trio; that year, after an engagement at the Jazz Gallery, Coleman was dismayed to see Dave Brubeck follow him and earn a significantly higher fee. As a result, Coleman decided to charge more for appearances, leading to repeated rejections by club owners and concert presenters. In response, classically-trained bassist David Izenzon relied on freelance jobs with orchestras and chamber groups, and drummer Charles Moffett, whom Coleman had known since high school, took up a job as a teacher.

At the same time, Coleman—tired of being perceived as a "cornpone musician" (an "illiterate guy who just plays")—began composing classically-oriented works, and, with financial assistance from Irving Stone, rented Town Hall in order to present a full-length concert of his works. In addition to booking the hall and writing all the music, Stone also put up posters advertising the concert, rehearsed the musicians, and hired a recording engineer.

=== Recording ===
The concert featured ten pieces for Coleman and his trio, a work for string quartet ("Dedication to Poets and Writers"), and a piece for rhythm-and-blues group titled "Blues Misused", on which Coleman played. The album Town Hall, 1962 includes three of the trio pieces plus the string quartet; the rest were recorded but have never been released. (Regarding the unreleased "Blues Misused", Stanley Crouch wrote that "it predicts the fusion era in no uncertain terms," while A. B. Spellman stated that the piece "must stand, with... Coleman's Free Jazz, as one of the two most important works that he has ever performed".)

The concert was a success in that several hundred people attended and responded enthusiastically, and the proceeds allowed Coleman to break even. However, it did not receive much attention, leading Coleman to recall: "I'll never forget... that night there was a subway strike, a newspaper strike, a taxi strike, I mean everything was strike, even a match strike, know what I mean? Not only that, I hired a guy to record it for me, and [later] he committed suicide." Following the concert, Coleman did not record or appear publicly for two years. The trio would not record again until 1965, when they produced Chappaqua Suite and At the Golden Circle Stockholm.

=== Release ===
Originally announced for release on Fugue, it was considered for release by Impulse! before landing with Blue Note, who intended to release the full concert over two volumes as BLP 4210 and 4211, omitting only a trio selection and a rhythm-and-blues number. After test pressings had been made, legal complications caused the release to be renegotiated; BLP 4211 was turned over to Bernard Stollman, and was released—minus "Taurus", a solo bass performance by Izenson—as Town Hall, 1962 on ESP-Disk.

According to Bernard Stollman, founder of ESP-Disk, Coleman gave him a tape of the Town Hall concert when the two first met. However, Stollman soon discovered that the bass track was distorted, rendering the recording unusable. Stollman took the tape to engineer Dave Sarser, who was able to compress the bass track, removing the distortion and laying the groundwork for the ESP-Disk release. Stollman also recalled that Blue Note Records offered to release the portion of the concert not included on the ESP disk, but failed to do so.

== Reception ==
Professional ratings
Review scores
Source	Rating
AllMusic	2.5/5 stars
The Penguin Guide to Jazz Recordings	3/4 stars
All About Jazz #1	5/5 stars
All About Jazz #2	5/5 stars
DownBeat	4/5 stars

The AllMusic review by Scott Yanow states, "Ornette Coleman's decision to temporarily retire from music... was unfortunate. His alto playing was getting stronger, and on evidence of this CD, he had plenty of original ideas that should have been documented.... Although Ornette's string writing (which leaves no room for improvising) is pretty well outside of jazz, his playing on the other tracks holds one's interest throughout."

The Penguin Guide to Jazz Recordings called "Sadness" one of Coleman's "most plangent and affecting themes... deeply marked by the blues," while "Doughnut" "catches Ornette in his most demonstrative form, punching out notes like a bar-walking R&B man." "The Ark" is described as "a seething troublous piece that refuses to cohere," and "Dedication" "points the way forward to what would be even more troubled projects in the future."

Lyn Horton, writing for All About Jazz, awarded the album 5 stars, commenting, "In the stream of its apparent freedom, this trio acts with constraints, imposed not by restriction, but by genius. To know what later transpired could only underscore the appreciation of what already exists." In a separate review for the same publication, Stuart Broomer also awarded it 5 stars, writing: "This concert is one of the essential Coleman documents, an extension of the raw, angular music he had developed in the early years of his public career... and an increasing sense of fluid group dialogue."

== Track listing ==
All tracks are written by Ornette Coleman.

Side A
No.	Title	Length
1.	"Doughnut"	9:00
2.	"Sadness"	4:00
3.	"Dedication to Poets and Writers"	8:50

Side B
No.	Title	Length
1.	"The Ark"	23:24

== Personnel ==
- Ornette Coleman – alto saxophone
- David Izenzon – bass
- Charles Moffett – drums
- Selwart Clarke, Nathan Goldstein – violin (track 3)
- Julian Barber – viola (track 3)
- Kermit Moore – cello (track 3)
