= Don Moore (musician) =

American jazz musician (1938–2025)

Donald Graham Moore (August 14, 1938 – June 10, 2025) was an American jazz double-bassist.

== Life and career ==
Moore was born in Philadelphia, Pennsylvania on August 14, 1938. He became interested in the bass around the age of 18. He played and recorded with Archie Shepp, Don Cherry and others in the New York Contemporary Five in Europe in 1963. Later in the 1960s Moore worked with Jackie McLean. He recorded with Elvin Jones in 1966 and Clifford Thornton in 1967.

Moore died on June 10, 2025, at the age of 86.

== Discography ==
With Elvin Jones

- Midnight Walk (Atlantic, 1966)

With Jackie McLean

- Jacknife (Blue Note, 1966)

With The New York Art Quartet

- Call It Art (Triple Point, 2013)

With Archie Shepp

- Archie Shepp & the New York Contemporary Five (Storyville, 1963)

With Clifford Thornton

- Freedom & Unity (Third World Records, 1967)

With Rahsaan Roland Kirk

- Kirk in Copenhagen (Mercury, 1964)
