= At the "Golden Circle" Stockholm =

Live album by the Ornette Coleman Trio
- Released: 1966
- Recorded: December 3–4, 1965
- Venues: Gyllene Cirkeln, Stockholm
- Genres: Free jazz; avant-garde jazz; post-bop
- Length: 39:25 (Vol. One); 43:50 (Vol. Two)
- Label: Blue Note

Ornette Coleman chronology
Chappaqua Suite (1965)	At the "Golden Circle" Stockholm (1966)	The Empty Foxhole (1966)

At the "Golden Circle" Stockholm is a pair of 1966 live albums by the Ornette Coleman Trio, documenting concerts on the nights of December 3 and 4, 1965, at the Gyllene Cirkeln club in Stockholm.

== Background ==
At the "Golden Circle" Stockholm marks Coleman's first release on Blue Note Records after leaving Atlantic. It is also Coleman's recorded debut on trumpet and violin, instruments which he took three years teaching himself to play after leaving Atlantic.

=== Release history ===
The 2002 CD reissue includes previously unreleased bonus tracks in both volumes.

== Reception ==
Professional ratings
Review scores
Source	Rating
AllMusic	Vol. 1
AllMusic	Vol. 2
DownBeat	Vol. 1
DownBeat	Vol. 2
Penguin Guide to Jazz	4/4 stars
The Rolling Stone Jazz Record Guide	Vol. 1
The Rolling Stone Jazz Record Guide	Vol. 2

The music has been described as "brilliant, optimistic closely unified thematic improvisations". "Snowflakes and Sunshine" marked the introduction of his unconventional violin and trumpet playing. "In Coleman's hands, both instruments are refunctioned into 'sound tools' (...) producers of sounds, rhythms and emotions."

The Penguin Guide to Jazz listed both volumes as part of its "Core Collection" and gave each a four-star rating (of a possible four stars).

Pitchfork ranked the album 156th on their "The 200 Best Albums of the 1960s" list.

== Track listing ==
=== At the "Golden Circle" Stockholm, Volume One ===
==== Original release ====
All tracks are written by Ornette Coleman.

Side 1
No.	Title	Length
1.	"Faces and Places"
2.	"European Echoes"

Side 2
No.	Title	Length
1.	"Dee Dee"
2.	"Dawn"

==== 2002 RVG edition ====
All tracks are written by Ornette Coleman.

No.	Title	Length
1.	"Announcement"	1:09
2.	"Faces and Places"	11:37
3.	"European Echoes"	7:53
4.	"Dee Dee"	10:38
5.	"Dawn"	8:05
6.	"Faces and Places" (alternate take)	8:31
7.	"European Echoes" (alternate take)	14:13
8.	"Doughnuts"	13:30

=== At the "Golden Circle" Stockholm, Volume Two ===
==== Original release ====
All tracks are written by Ornette Coleman.

Side 1
No.	Title	Length
1.	"Snowflakes and Sunshine"
2.	"Morning Song"

Side 2
No.	Title	Length
1.	"The Riddle"
2.	"Antiques"

==== 2002 RVG edition ====
All tracks are written by Ornette Coleman.

No.	Title	Length
1.	"Snowflakes and Sunshine"	10:42
2.	"Morning Song"	10:41
3.	"The Riddle"	9:54
4.	"Antiques"	12:35
5.	"Morning Song" (alternate take)	8:16
6.	"The Riddle" (alternate take)	12:39
7.	"Antiques" (alternate take)	13:00

== Personnel ==
- Ornette Coleman – alto saxophone, trumpet, violin
- David Izenzon – double bass
- Charles Moffett – drums
