= Archie Shepp =

American jazz musician (born 1937)

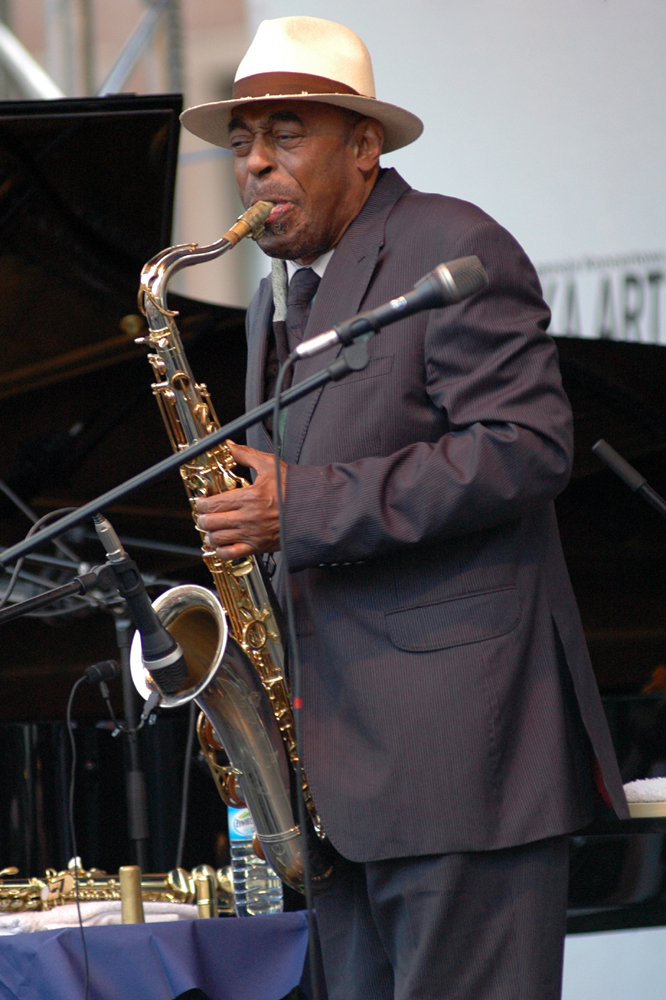
- Shepp in Warsaw, 2008

Background information
- Born: Archie Vernon Shepp; May 24, 1937 (age 89); Fort Lauderdale, Florida, United States
- Genres: Jazz, free jazz, avant-garde jazz
- Occupations: Musician, composer, educator
- Instruments: Tenor saxophone, soprano saxophone, alto saxophone, piano, vocals
- Years active: 1960–present
- Labels: Impulse!, SteepleChase, Denon, BYG Actuel, Marge
- Website: archieshepp.org

Archie Vernon Shepp (born May 24, 1937) is an American jazz saxophonist, educator and playwright who since the 1960s has played a central part in the development of avant-garde jazz.

== Biography ==
=== Early life ===
Shepp was born in Fort Lauderdale, Florida, but was raised in Philadelphia, Pennsylvania. He began playing banjo with his father, then studied piano and saxophone while attending high school in Germantown. He studied drama at Goddard College from 1955 to 1959.

He played in a Latin jazz band for a short time before joining avant-garde pianist Cecil Taylor's band. In 1962, Shepp performed with trumpeter Bill Dixon at the 8th World Festival of Youth and Students in Helsinki, Finland. Shepp's first recording under his own name, Archie Shepp - Bill Dixon Quartet, was released on Savoy Records in 1963 and features a composition by Ornette Coleman. Along with alto saxophonist John Tchicai and trumpeter Don Cherry, Shepp formed the New York Contemporary Five. John Coltrane's admiration for Shepp led to recordings for Impulse! Records, the first of which was Four for Trane in 1964, an album of mainly Coltrane compositions on which he was joined by Tchicai, trombonist Roswell Rudd, trumpeter Alan Shorter, bassist Reggie Workman and drummer Charles Moffett.

=== Early career ===
Shepp participated in the sessions for Coltrane's A Love Supreme in late 1964, but none of the takes he participated in were included on the final LP release (they were made available for the first time on a 2002 reissue). However, Shepp, along with Tchicai and others from the Four for Trane sessions, then recorded Ascension with Coltrane in 1965. His place at the forefront of the avant-garde jazz scene alongside Coltrane was epitomized when the pair split New Thing at Newport, in late 1965: the first side was a Coltrane set, the second a Shepp set.

(video) Interview from 1978: Shepp discusses jazz trends, poverty, politics, civil rights, culture and society.

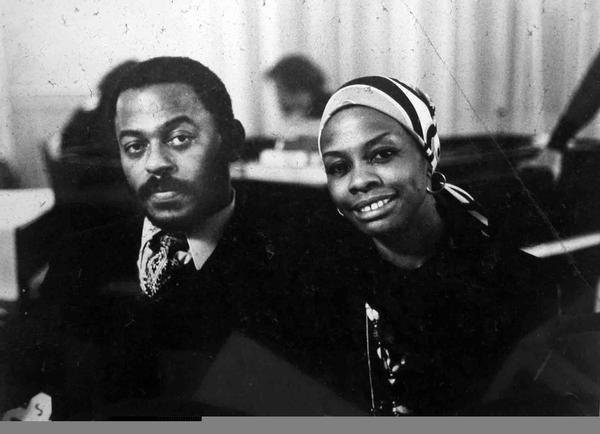
Shepp with the singer Shirley Bunnie Foy, with whom he recorded the 1975 album A Sea of Faces

In 1965, Shepp released Fire Music, which included the first signs of his developing political consciousness and an increasing Afrocentric orientation. The album took its title from a ceremonial African music tradition and included a reading of an elegy for Malcolm X. Shepp's 1967 The Magic of Ju-Ju also took its name from African musical traditions, and the music was strongly rooted in African music, featuring an African percussion ensemble. At this time, many African-American jazzmen were increasingly influenced by various continental African cultural and musical traditions; along with Pharoah Sanders, Shepp was at the forefront of this movement. The Magic of Ju-Ju defined Shepp's sound for the next few years: freeform avant-garde saxophone lines coupled with rhythms and cultural concepts from Africa.

Shepp was invited to perform in Algiers for the 1969 Pan-African Cultural Festival of the Organization of African Unity, along with Dave Burrell, Sunny Murray, and Clifford Thornton. This ensemble then recorded several sessions in Paris at the BYG Actuel studios.

Shepp continued to experiment into the new decade, at various times including harmonica players and spoken word poets in his ensembles. With 1972's Attica Blues and The Cry of My People, he spoke out for civil rights; the former album was a response to the Attica Prison riots. Shepp also writes for theater; his works include The Communist (1965) and Lady Day: A Musical Tragedy (1972). Both were produced by Robert Kalfin at the Chelsea Theater Center.

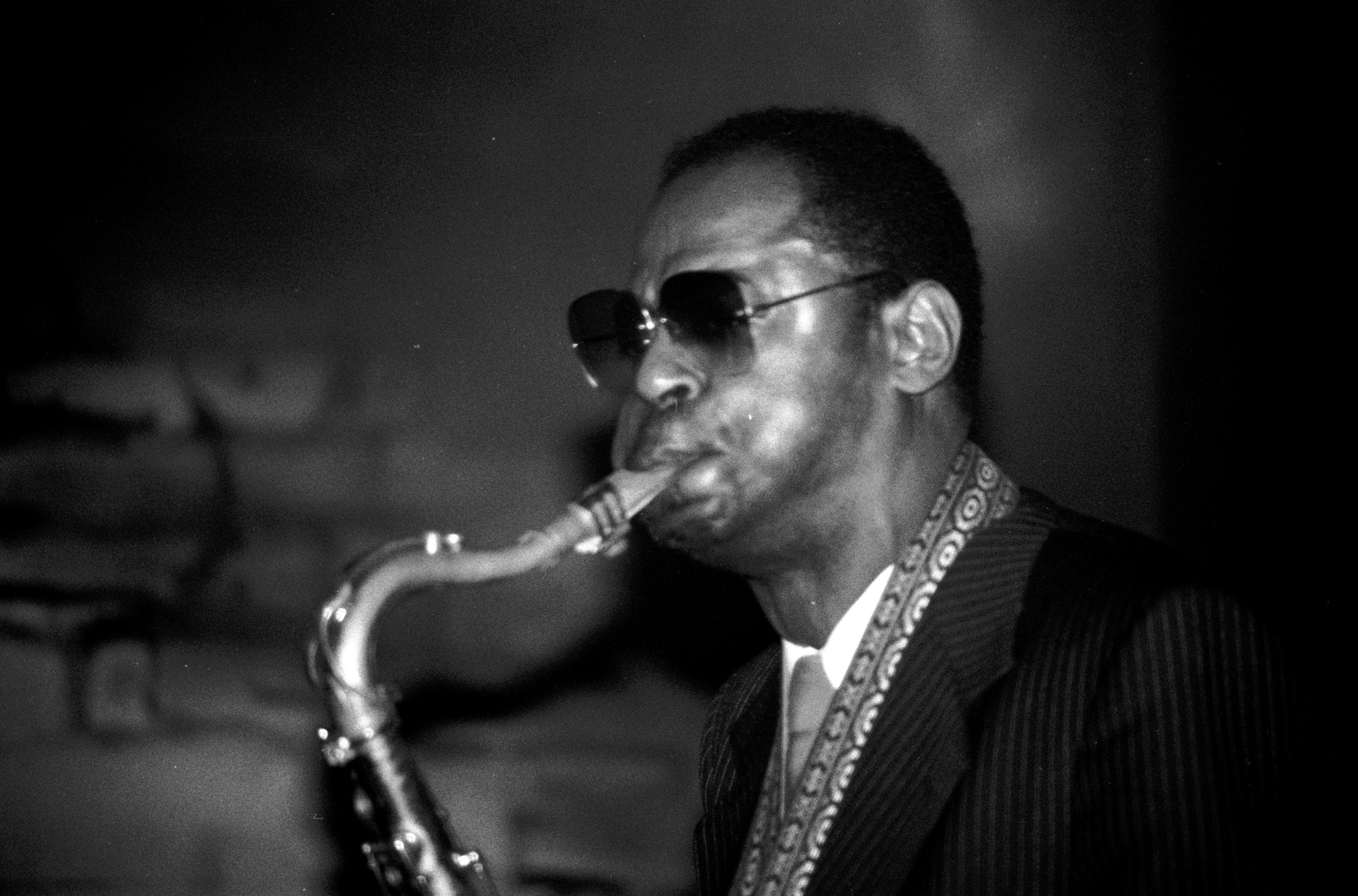
Shepp in France, 1982

In the late 1960s, Shepp began his teaching career as a professor of African-American Studies at SUNY in Buffalo, New York. In 1971, Shepp was recruited to the University of Massachusetts Amherst by Randolph Bromery, beginning a 30-year career as a professor of music. Shepp's first two courses were entitled "Revolutionary Concepts in African-American Music" and "Black Musician in the Theater".

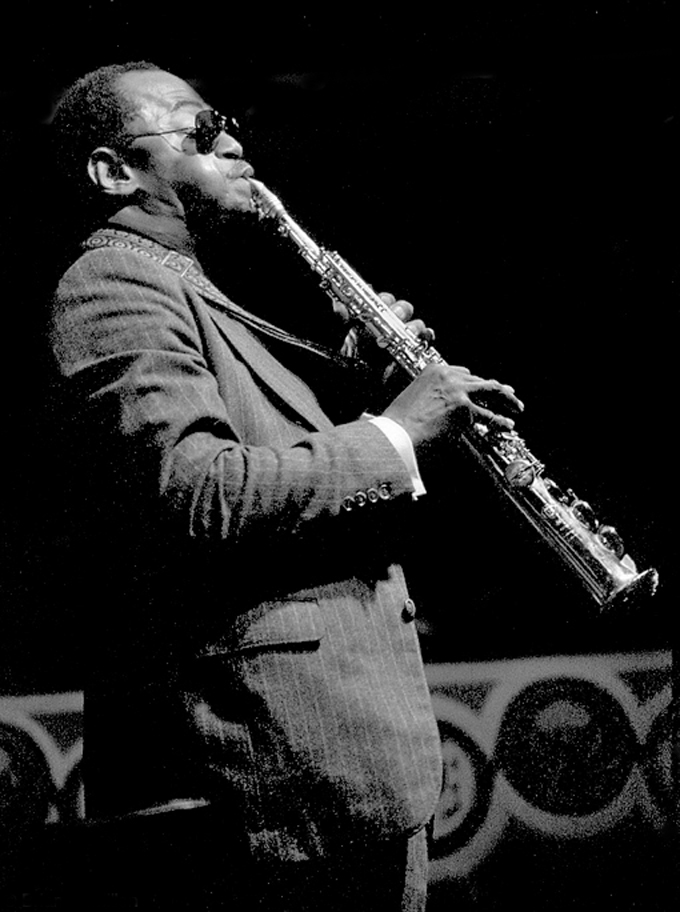
Shepp at Keystone Korner, San Francisco, August 19, 1982

In the late 1970s and beyond, Shepp's career went between various old territories and various new ones. He continued to explore African music, while also recording blues, ballads, spirituals (on the 1977 album Goin' Home with Horace Parlan) and tributes to more traditional jazz figures such as Charlie Parker and Sidney Bechet, while at other times dabbling in R&B, and recording with various European artists including Jasper van't Hof, Tchangodei and Dresch Mihály.

=== Later career ===
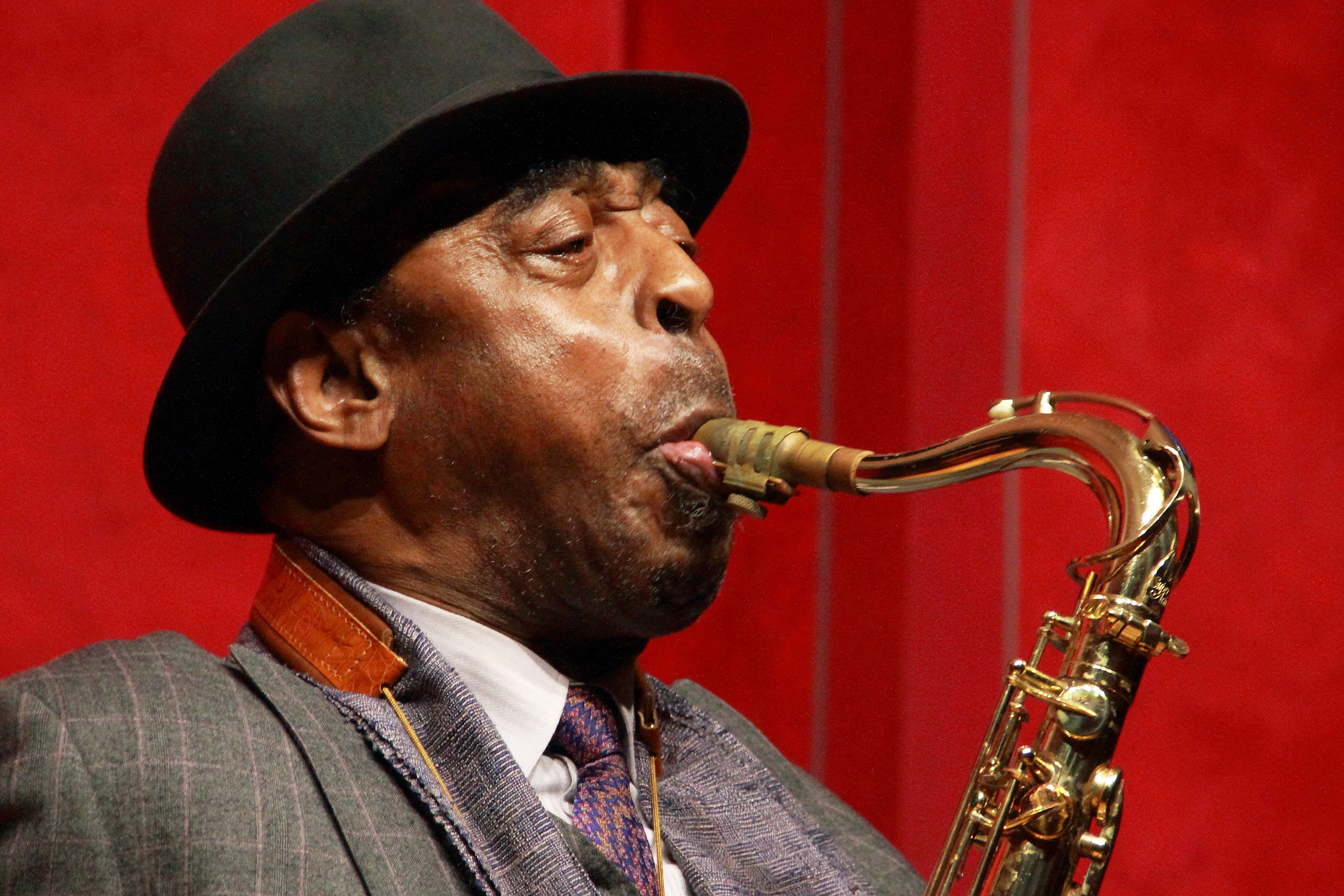
Shepp in 2016

Shepp is featured in the 1981 documentary film Imagine the Sound, in which he discusses and performs his music and poetry. Shepp also appears in Mystery, Mr. Ra, a 1984 French documentary about Sun Ra. The film also includes footage of Shepp playing with Sun Ra's Arkestra.

Since the early 1990s, he has often played with the French trumpeter Eric Le Lann. In 1993, Shepp worked with Michel Herr to create the original score for the film Just Friends.

In 2002, Shepp appeared on the Red Hot Organization's tribute album to Fela Kuti, Red Hot and Riot. Shepp appeared on a track entitled "No Agreement" alongside Res, Tony Allen, Ray Lema, Baaba Maal, and Positive Black Soul. In 2004, Archie Shepp founded his own record label, Archieball, together with Monette Berthomier. The label is located in Paris, France, and includes collaborations with Jacques Coursil, Monica Passos, Bernard Lubat, and Frank Cassenti.
