= Dave Rempis =

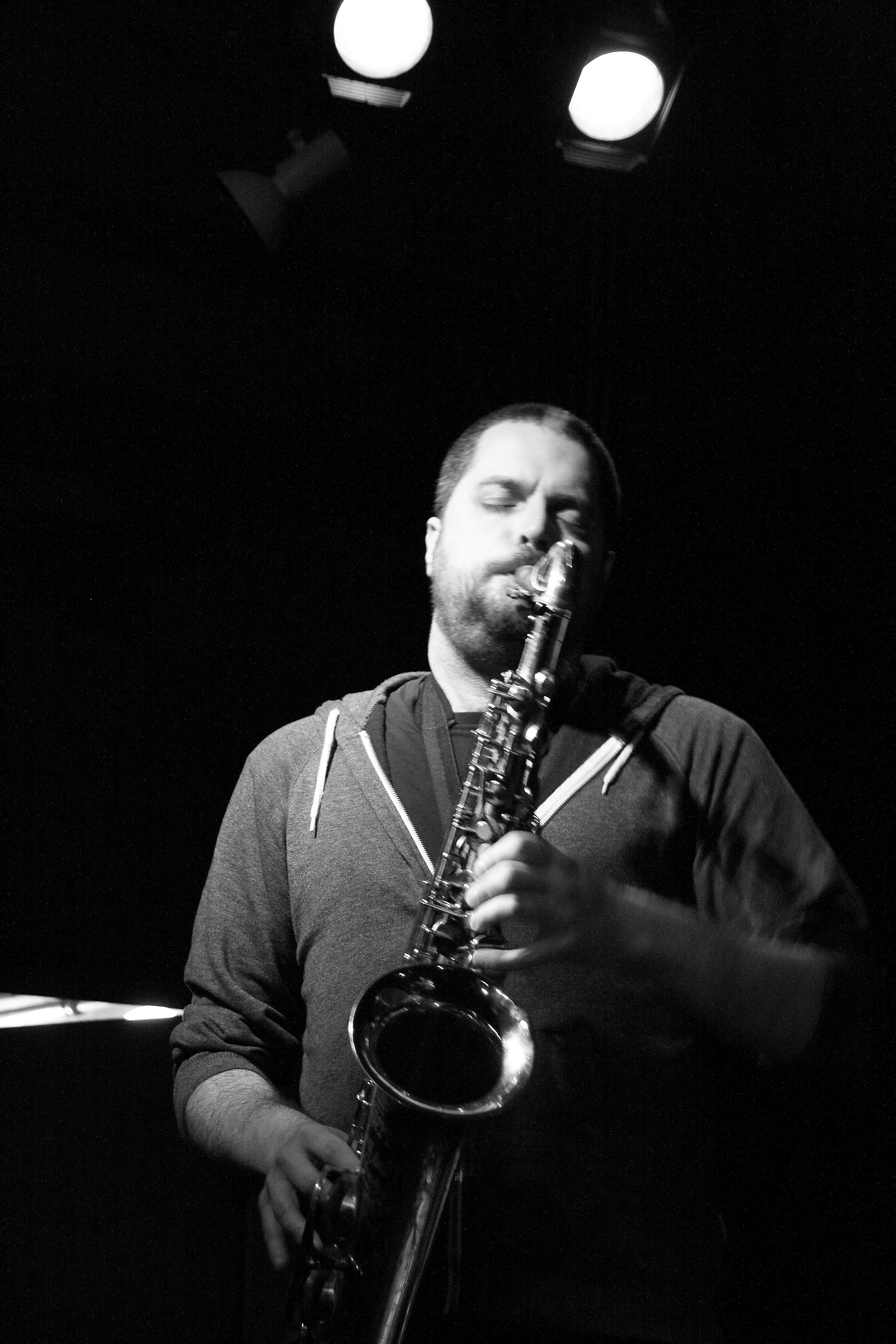

Background information
- Born: March 24, 1975 (age 51)
- Origin: Wellesley, Massachusetts
- Genres: Jazz free jazz avant-garde jazz free improvisation
- Occupation: Musician
- Instruments: Soprano sax, alto sax, tenor sax, baritone sax
- Years active: 1998–present
- Labels: OkkaDisk, 482 Music, Clean Feed, Not Two, Aerophonic
- Website: Official Website

Dave Rempis (born March 24, 1975) is an American free jazz saxophonist. He plays the soprano, alto, tenor, and baritone saxophones.

== Life and career ==
Dave was born in Wellesley, Massachusetts in 1975. He began his musical studies at the age of 8. While caddying in the Boston area, Rempis was given a deep collection of jazz LPs, in exchange for transferring them to cassette tape. In 1993, Rempis began a degree in classical saxophone at Northwestern University with Frederick Hemke. As part of his studies in anthropology, he spent a year at the International Centre for African Music and Dance at the University of Ghana in Legon, studying African music and ethnomusicology. After graduating from Northwestern in 1997, Rempis decided to focus on performing, and in March 1998 was asked to replace saxophonist Mars Williams in the Chicago jazz band The Vandermark 5, led by saxophonist Ken Vandermark.

During his tenure with The Vandermark Five, Rempis also began to develop many Chicago-based groups and cooperative units as Triage, The Rempis Percussion Quartet, The Engines, Ballister, and The Rempis/Daisy Duo. He recorded for labels such as Okka Disk, 482 Music, Clean Feed, Not Two, and Aerophonic, an artist-run label that Rempis founded in the winter of 2013. His collaborations include a wide variety of creative improvised music legends, ranging from Peter Brötzmann and John Tchicai to Joe McPhee, Marshall Allen, and Roscoe Mitchell.

Rempis also works as a music programmer in the Chicago area. He curated the weekly "Improvised Music" concert series at Elastic Arts (2002-2023), helped establish the Umbrella Music collective and its annual music festival, worked as lead organizer of the Downtown Sound Gallery concert series at Gallery 37, and organized the yearly Pitchfork Music Festival.

Rempis added the soprano saxophone to his arsenal of instruments after his friend and mentor Mars Williams (d. November 2023) left his soprano saxophone to Rempis after years of battling cancer.

== Discography ==
=== As leader/co-leader ===
Release year	Title	Label	Personnel/Notes
2001	Premiun Plastics	Solitaire Records	As Triage; with Jason Ajemian (bass), Tim Daisy (drums)
2003	Twenty Minute Cliff	Okka Disk	As Triage; with Jason Ajemian (bass), Tim Daisy (drums)
2004	Out of Season	482 Music	Quartet with Jim Baker (piano), Jason Roebke (bass), Tim Daisy (drums)
2004	American Mythology	Okka Disk	As Triage; with Jason Ajemian (bass), Tim Daisy (drums)
2005	Back to the Circle	Okka Disk	Duo with Tim Daisy (drums)
2005	Circular Logic	Utech Records	As The Rempis Percussion Quartet; with Anton Hatwich (bass), Tim Daisy, Frank Rosaly (drums)
2006	Rip Tear Crunch	482 Music	As The Rempis Percussion Quartet; with Anton Hatwich (bass), Tim Daisy, Frank Rosaly (drums)
2006	Stagger	Utech Records	As Triage; with Jason Ajemian (bass), Tim Daisy (drums)
2007	Hunter-Gatherers	482 Music	As The Rempis Percussion Quartet; with Anton Hatwich (bass), Tim Daisy, Frank Rosaly (drums)
2007	The Engines	Okka Disk	As The Engines; with Jeb Bishop (trombone), Nate McBride (bass), Tim Daisy (drums)
2009	The Disappointment of Parsley	Not Two	As The Rempis Percussion Quartet; with Anton Hatwich (bass), Tim Daisy, Frank Rosaly (drums)
2010	Cyrillic	482 Music	Duo with Frank Rosaly (drums)
2010	Wire and Brass	Okka Disk	As The Engines; with Jeb Bishop (trombone), Nate McBride (bass), Tim Daisy (drums)
2010	Bastard String	Self-released	As the band Ballister; trio with Fred Lonberg-Holm (cello), Paal Nilssen-Love (drums)
2011	Montreal Parade	482 Music	As The Rempis Percussion Quartet; with Ingebrigt Håker Flaten (bass), Tim Daisy, Frank Rosaly (drums)
2012	Instruments of Change	Not Two	As the band Construction Party; quartet with Forbes Graham (trumpet), Pandelis Karayorgis (piano), Luther Gray (drums)
2012	Mechanisms	Clean Feed	As the band Ballister; trio with Fred Lonberg-Holm (cello), Paal Nilssen-Love (drums)
2013	Other Violets	Not Two	As The Engines; with John Tchicai (tenor sax and flute), Jeb Bishop (trombone), Nate McBride (bass), Tim Daisy (drums)
2013	Mi Casa es en Fuego	Self-released	As the band Ballister; trio with Fred Lonberg-Holm (cello), Paal Nilssen-Love (drums)
2013	Phalanx	Aerophonic	As The Rempis Percussion Quartet; with Ingebrigt Håker Flaten (bass), Tim Daisy, Frank Rosaly (drums)
2013	Boss of the Plains	Aerophonic	As the band Wheelhouse; with Jason Adasiewicz (vibes), Nate McBride (bass)
2014	Both Ends	Bocian	As the band Ballister; trio with Fred Lonberg-Holm (cello), Paal Nilssen-Love (drums)
2014	Second Spring	Aerophonic	Duo with Tim Daisy (drums)
2014	Aphelion	Aerophonic	Trio with Joshua Abrams (bass), Avreeayl Ra (percussion)
2014	Spectral	Aerophonic	Trio with Darren Johnston (trumpet), Larry Osch (tenor/sopranino saxophone)
2015	From Wolves to Whales	Aerophonic	Quartet with Nate Wooley (trumpet), Pascal Niggenkemper (bass), Chris Corsano (drums)
2015	Worse for the Wear	Aerophonic	As the band Ballister; trio with Fred Lonberg-Holm (cello), Paal Nilssen-Love (drums)
2015	Western Automatic	Aerophonic	As The Chicago Reed Quartet; with Nick Mazzarella (alto sax), Mars Williams (sopranino/soprano/alto/tenor saxophone), Ken Vandermark (clarinet, bass clarinet, alto/tenor saxophone)
2015	Cash and Carry	Aerophonic	As The Rempis Percussion Quartet; with Ingebrigt Håker Flaten (bass), Tim Daisy, Frank Rosaly (drums)
2018	Hiljaisuus	Astral Spirits, Monofonus Press	As the band Kuzu; with Tashi Dorji (guitar), Tyler Damon (drums)
2018	Ithra	Aerophonic	Trio with Tomeka Reid (cello) and Joshua Abrams (bass)
2019	Lift to Drag	Medium Sound	As the band Kuzu; with Tashi Dorji (guitar), Tyler Damon (drums)
2020	Purple Dark Opal	Aerophonic	As the band Kuzu; with Tashi Dorji (guitar), Tyler Damon (drums)
2020	Of Things Beyond Thule Vol. 1	Aerophonic	
2020	The COVID Tapes: Solos, Duos & Trios	Aerophonic	
2021	The Glass Delusion	Astral Spirits, Aerophonic	As the band Kuzu; with Tashi Dorji (guitar), Tyler Damon (drums)
2021	All Your Ghosts In One Corner	Aerophonic	As the band Kuzu; with Tashi Dorji (guitar), Tyler Damon (drums)
2023	Bennu	Aerophonic	Duo with Avreeayl Ra
2023	Sirocco	Aerophonic	Trio with Tim Daisy (d) and Mark Feldman (violin)
2023	Earscratcher	Aerophonic	Quartet with Fred Lonberg-Holm (cello), Tim Daisy (d), and Elizabeth Harnik (p) (recorded at Alte Gerberei, mixed by Markus Massinger)
2024	Lip	Aerophonic	Duo with gabby fluke-mogul (strings)
2024	Propulsion	Aerophonic	Jason Adasiewicz (v), Joshua Abrams (b), and Tyler Damon (d)
2024	Gnash	Aerophonic	Duo with Tashi Dorji (g) (recorded at Sugar Maple, mixed by David Zuchowski)
2024	Truss	Aerophonic	Quartet with Jakob Heinemann (b), Bill Harris (d), and Pandelis Karayorgis (recorded at Elastic Arts, mixed by David Zuchowski)
2024	Near Mint Minus	Aerophonic	The Brunt, with Gerrit Hatcher (ts), Kent Kessler (b), and Bill Harris (d) (recorded and mixed live in Chicago)
2025	Sudden Dusk	Aerophonic	Archer, with Terrie Ex (g), Jon Rune Strøm (b), and Tollef Østvang (d). (Recorded at Constellation & the Sugar Maple)
2025	House and Home	Aerophonic	Wheelhouse, with Nate McBride (b) and Jason Adasiewicz (vb) (recorded at Constellation)
2025	Embers and Ash	Aerophonic	Quartet with Russ Johnson (tr), Jakob Heinemann (b), and Jeremy Cunningham (d) (recorded at The Hungry Brain by Dave Zuchowski)
2025	Dial Up	Aerophonic	Trio with Jason Adasiewicz (vb) and Chris Corsano (d) (recorded at Constellation & the Sugar Maple)
2026	Three From The Vault	Aerophonic	Trio with Katinka Kleijn (c) and Lia Kohl (c) (recorded at May Chapel).
2026	Orbital	Aerophonic	The Outskirts, with Ingebrigt Håker Flaten (b) and Frank Rosaly (d) (recorded at Teatro Torresino). Marta Warelis (p) joins the trio on disc two (recorded at Rataplan).
2026	Clocking the Wheel	Aerophonic	Ballister + Luke Stewart (b)

=== As sideman ===
==== with Audio One ====
Release year	Leader	Title	Label
2014	Audio One	An International Report	Audiographic
2014	Audio One	The Midwest School	Audiographic
2015	Audio One	What Thomas Bernhard Saw	Audiographic

==== with The Resonance Ensemble ====
Release year	Leader	Title	Label
2011	The Resonance Ensemble	Kafka In Flight	Not Two
2012	The Resonance Ensemble	What Country Is This	Not Two
2013	The Resonance Ensemble	Head Above Water, Feet out of the Fire	Not Two
2015	The Resonance Ensemble	Double Arc	Not Two

==== with The Territory Band ====
Release year	Leader	Title	Label
2000	The Territory Band-1	Transatlantic Bridge	Okka Disk
2002	The Territory Band-2	Atlas	Okka Disk
2004	The Territory Band-3	Map Theory	Okka Disk
2005	The Territory Band-4	Company Switch	Okka Disk
2006	The Territory Band-5	New Horse for the White House	Okka sisk
2007	The Territory Band-6	Collide	Okka Disk

==== with The Vandermark 5 ====
Release year	Leader	Title	Label
1999	The Vandermark 5	Simpatico	Atavistic
2000	The Vandermark 5	Burn the Incline	Atavistic
2001	The Vandermark 5	Acoustic Machine	Atavistic
2003	The Vandermark 5	Free Jazz Classics 1 & 2	Atavistic
2003	The Vandermark 5	Airports for Light	Atavistic
2004	The Vandermark 5	Elements of Style	Atavistic
2005	The Vandermark 5	The Color of Memory	Atavistic
2006	The Vandermark 5	Free Jazz Classics 3 & 4	Atavistic
2006	The Vandermark 5	A Discontinuous Line	Atavistic
2008	The Vandermark 5	Beat Reader	Atavistic
2009	The Vandermark 5	Annular Gift	Not Two
2010	The Vandermark 5	The Horse Jumps and the Ship Is Gone	Not Two
2013	The Vandermark 5	Impressions of Po Music	Okka Disk

==== others ====
Release year	Leader	Title	Label
2008	Ingebrigt Håker Flaten	Year of the Board	Jazzland
2008	Keefe Jackson	Just Like This	Delmark
2009	Paul Giallorenzo	Get In to Go Out	482 Music
2009	Waclaw Zimpel	Four Walls	Multikulti
2013	Pandelis Karayorgis	Circuitous	Driff
2014	Pandelis Karayorgis	Afterimage	Driff
2015	Tim Daisy	Seven Compositions for Duet	Relay
