= Empathetic Parts =

Live album by Mike Reed's Loose Assembly Featuring Roscoe Mitchell
- Released: 2010
- Recorded: November 7, 2009
- Venues: Umbrella Music Festival, The Hideout, Chicago
- Genre: Free improvisation
- Labels: 482 Music; 482-1074

Mike Reed chronology
Stories and Negotiations (2010)	Empathetic Parts (2010)	It Only Happened at Night (2011)

Empathetic Parts is a live album by Mike Reed's Loose Assembly. The group's third release, it was recorded on November 7, 2009, at the Umbrella Music Festival held at The Hideout in Chicago, and was issued on CD in 2010 by 482 Music. Led by drummer Reed, the group features saxophonist Greg Ward, cellist Tomeka Reid, vibraphonist Jason Adasiewicz, and double bassist Joshua Abrams, plus guest saxophonist Roscoe Mitchell.

The album consists of two tracks. The 33-minute title track is based on the notion of what Reed calls "collective arranging," "an approach in which the structural development, harmony, and shape of a piece of particular music was created spontaneously by the entire band." "I'll Be Right Here Waiting" is a composition by Steve McCall that initially appeared on the 1978 album Air Time by the collective free jazz trio Air.

== Reception ==
Professional ratings
Review scores
Source	Rating
All About Jazz	4/5 stars
All About Jazz	4.5/5 stars
DownBeat	4/5 stars

In a review for DownBeat, Michael Jackson wrote: "Reed devised a system of colored paddles to signal changes of texture and note value. Despite this artifice, the music comes across with a strong narrative arc rather than as an aleatoric collage."

Troy Collins of All About Jazz stated: "Mitchell's congenial rapport with Reed's young quintet establishes a historical continuum hearkening back to his early days as founder of the Art Ensemble Of Chicago... A cross-generational summit meeting between one of the organization's key founders and its newest heir, Empathetic Parts truly embodies the AACM's credo, Great Black Music, Ancient to the Future."

The Chicago Reader's Bill Meyer commented: "It should be obvious how the album got its name—without empathy, this would be a recipe for ego-tripping and frustration. But the members of Loose Assembly support rather than dominate one another, so that the music slips fluidly from full-steam-ahead ensemble swinging to spiky staccato exchanges."

Writing for The New York City Jazz Record, Ken Waxman remarked: "the percussionist's stylistic timekeeping - alarm clock-like ringing paradiddles to cumulative back beats and rim shots - solders together the disparate techniques into a throbbing narrative... Creatively busy, Reed's Loose Assembly proves to be loose only in its ability to accommodate an additional voice, but not in creative performance."

== Track listing ==
1. "Empathetic Parts" (Mike Reed) – 33:49
2. "I'll Be Right Here Waiting" (Steve McCall)– 8:09

== Personnel ==
- Mike Reed – drums
- Roscoe Mitchell – alto saxophone, soprano saxophone, flute
- Greg Ward – alto saxophone
- Tomeka Reid – cello
- Jason Adasiewicz – vibraphone
- Joshua Abrams – double bass
