= Cyrillic (disambiguation) =

Cyrillic refers to the Cyrillic script. It may also refer to:

- Early Cyrillic alphabet, used for Old Church Slavonic
- Any of the Cyrillic alphabets, language specific alphabets based on the Cyrillic script
- Cyrillic (Unicode block), one of the Unicode blocks with Cyrillic characters

== Music ==
- Cyrillic (album), 2010 jazz album
