= Varmint (album) =

Studio album by Jason Adasiewicz
- Released: 2009
- Recorded: August 2008
- Studio: Electrical Audio, Chicago
- Genre: Jazz
- Length: 50:53
- Label: Cuneiform

Jason Adasiewicz chronology
Rolldown (2008)	Varmint (2009)	Sun Rooms (2010)

Varmint is an album by American jazz vibraphonist Jason Adasiewicz, which was recorded in 2008 and released on Cuneiform. It was the second recording with his quintet Rolldown, featuring cornetist Josh Berman, saxophonist Aram Shelton, bassist Jason Roebke and drummer Frank Rosaly.

== Reception ==
Professional ratings
Review scores
Source	Rating
All About Jazz	3.5/5 stars
AllMusic	4/5 stars
Down Beat	4/5 stars
Tom Hull – on the Web	B+

In his review for AllMusic, Michael G. Nastos states "The second recording for Jason Adasiewicz with his quintet Rolldown takes the band into a distinct modern jazz arena, sporting equal parts of straight-ahead mainstream pacings alongside the bold, inventive, improvisational music of latter and current day Chicago."

The Down Beat review by Bill Meyer says "Their second effort, Varmint, shows growth exactly where it was most needed. The compositions are better developed, the playing more relaxed and fluid, and the record better represents the quintet’s onstage spirit."

The All About Jazz review by Troy Collins states "An impressive follow-up to a solid debut, Varmint finds Adasiewicz growing as a composer and improviser, shedding his influences while discovering his voice."

In a review for JazzTimes Bill Milkowski notes "There are bracing solo contributions from cornetist Josh Berman and pungent-toned alto saxophonist Aram Shelton, while bassist Jason Roebke and drummer Frank Rosaly provide lightly swinging momentum throughout."

In Point of Departure, Bill Shoemaker reviews the album combined with Josh Berman' Old Idea and concludes "They potentially have decades to refine this already remarkable partnership; at mid-century, these complementary albums may well be considered early milestones."

== Track listing ==
All compositions by Jason Adasiewicz except as indicated

1. "Green Grass" – 6:02
2. "Varmint" – 8:36
3. "Dagger" – 7:16
4. "Hide" – 7:54
5. "I Hope She Is Awake" – 6:36
6. "Punchbug" – 8:21
7. "The Griots" (Andrew Hill) – 6:08

== Personnel ==
- Jason Adasiewicz - vibraphone
- Josh Berman – cornet
- Aram Shelton – alto sax, clarinet
- Jason Roebke – bass
- Frank Rosaly – drums
