= Out of Season =

Out of Season may refer to:

- Out of Season (Beth Gibbons and Rustin Man album), 2002
- Out of Season (Dave Rempis album), 2004
- Out of Season (1975 film), a British film by Alan Bridges
- Out of Season (1998 film), a film directed by Jeanette L. Buck
- Out of Season (2004 film), a film directed by Jevon O'Neill, featuring Dennis Hopper
- Out of Season (2023 film), a French film directed by Stéphane Brizé
- "Out of Season" (short story), a 1933 story by Ernest Hemingway
- "Out of Season", a song by Itzy from their 2025 album Collector
- "Out of Season", a song by REO Speedwagon from their 1980 album Hi Infidelity

== See also ==
- Hunting season
