= Straight Lines (album) =

Studio album by Ken Vandermark
- Released: 1999
- Recorded: September 3, 1998
- Studio: Airwave, Chicago
- Genre: Jazz
- Length: 55:36
- Label: Atavistic
- Producer: John Corbett

Ken Vandermark chronology
| Funky-Do! (1999) | Straight Lines (1999) | Live in Wels & Chicago, 1998 (1999) |

Straight Lines is an album by the American jazz reedist Ken Vandermark, recorded in 1998 and released on Atavistic. The Joe Harriott Project, a pianoless quartet with four members of the Vandermark 5, plays the music of the Jamaican saxophonist Joe Harriott, transcribed and arranged by Vandermark. Three tunes are from the album Free Form and four from Abstract.

== Reception ==
Professional ratings
Review scores
| Source | Rating |
|---|---|
| AllMusic | 4/5 stars |
| The Penguin Guide to Jazz | 3/4 stars |

In his review for AllMusic, Tim Sheridan states: "The tunes are filled with odd time signiatures, quirky stops and meaty lines that make for excellent improvisation on the part of Vandermark, Jeb Bishop on trombone, Kent Kessler on bass and Tim Mulvenna on drums. A strong tribute."

The Penguin Guide to Jazz says that "the record is under-rehearsed and unfinished in feel ... It could be that the group are a shade too respectful of Harriott's themes, since their playing feels a bit stiff and uncertain, something that a Vandermark record has never been in the past."

== Track listing ==
All compositions by Joe Harriott

1. "Tonal" – 6:59
2. "Shadows" – 6:17
3. "Straight Lines" – 11:39
4. "Abstract" – 6:27
5. "Idioms" – 8:13
6. "Pictures" – 9:01
7. "Formation" – 7:00

== Personnel ==
- Ken Vandermark – tenor sax, clarinet, bass clarinet
- Jeb Bishop – trombone
- Kent Kessler – bass
- Tim Mulvenna – drums
