= Rolldown =

Rolldown may refer to:

- A game formerly offered by the Multi-State Lottery Association; replaced by [doodle LottO]
- Roll-down curtain
- Profiting from the passage of time in a positively sloped ("normal") yield curve
- Rolldown (album)
