= Parking chair =

Chair used to reserve a parking space

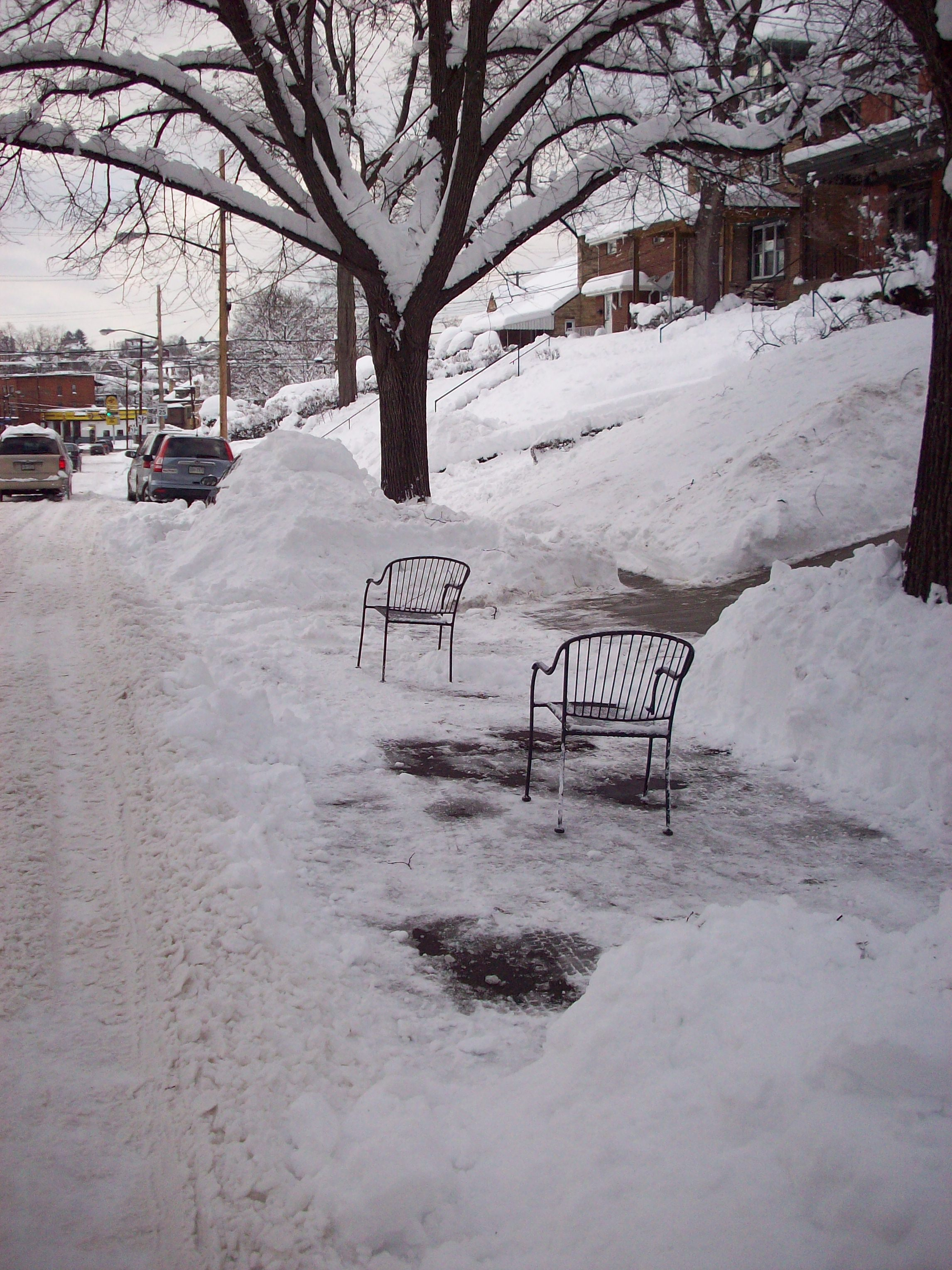
Two patio chairs reserving a shoveled-out street parking space in Pittsburgh's Squirrel Hill neighborhood

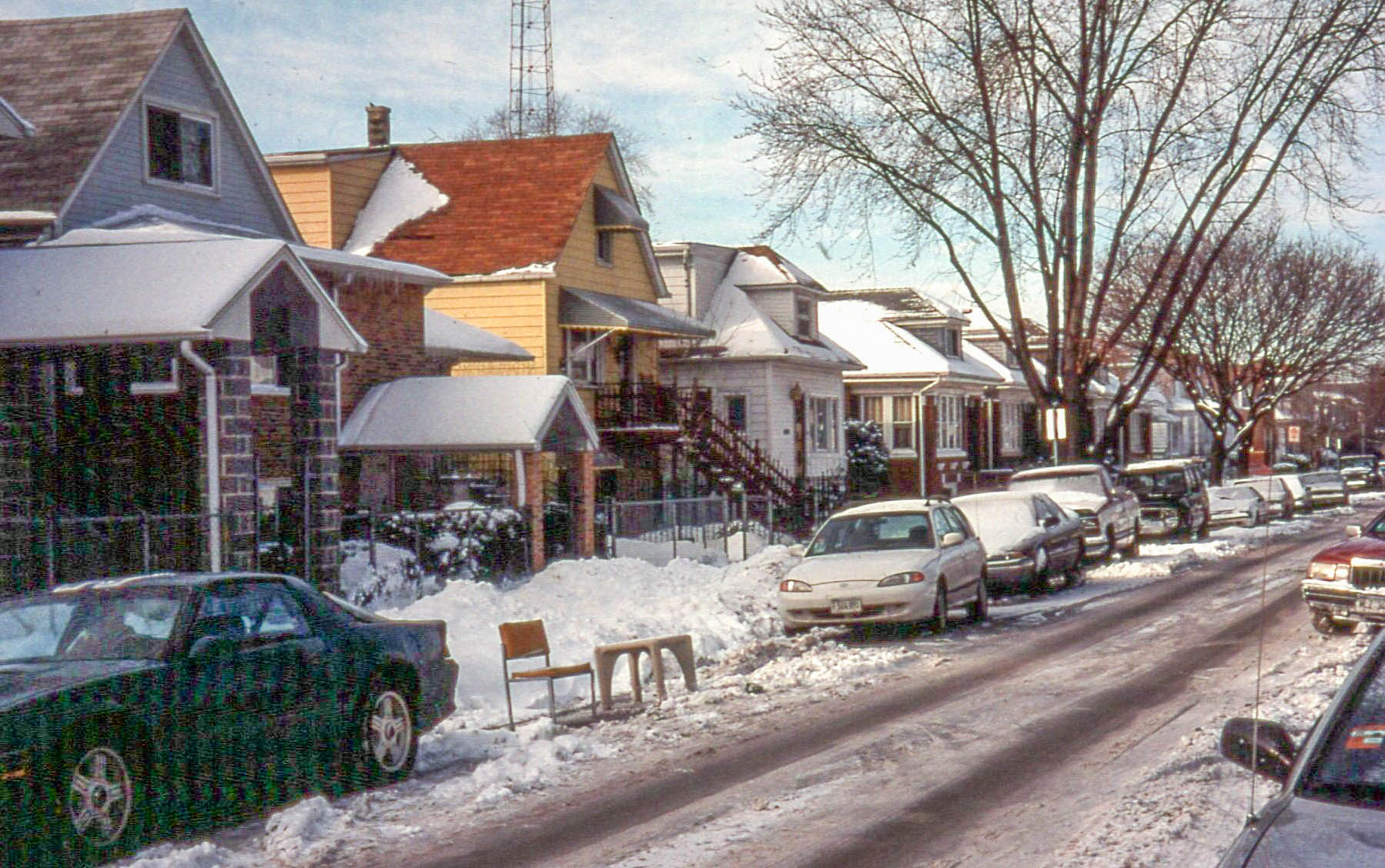
A chair and a small table marking a parking space as informally reserved in Chicago

A parking chair is a chair that is used by a motorist to informally mark a public parking space as reserved. Other objects are also used for this purpose, including trash cans, ladders, ironing boards, traffic cones, and similar-sized objects. In Boston, these are known as parking space savers or just space savers. For curbside parking spaces, two or more items are normally used; for angle spaces, only one is needed.

The practice of using parking chairs is common in snowy weather within urban residential areas of the United States, where vehicle owners do not wish to risk losing their vehicle's previously occupied space in its absence. Other spaces may be hard to find due to accumulation of uncleared and plowed snow, and the owner of a vehicle may have invested considerable work in clearing a parking space to free the car. This is common in areas where side streets are fully lined with parallel parked cars allowing only the center of the street to be cleared of snow, which then has the effect of pushing the snow onto the parked cars. The practice is widely criticized because it reduces the amount of parking, and is considered unneighborly and selfish.

This practice is especially common in the Northeastern United States (for example, in Boston and Pittsburgh), as well as Philadelphia, and the Upper Midwest and Great Lakes regions (for example, in Chicago, where it is referred to as "dibs"). In Pittsburgh and Chicago, the use of parking chairs is considered to be an "iconic" regional practice.

== Use in inclement weather ==
In snowstorms, vehicle owners with such a need mark the space as their own that their vehicle previously occupied after digging out the heavy snow that covered the vehicle and blocked them in. A such way to indicate that the parking spot is reserved is to place a lawn chair often referred as a "Parking Chair" to indicate others of the reserved spot for the owner that will soon return. The legality and level of enforcement of existing laws pertaining to this practice varies by location. Generally, curbside parking spaces are public property and are available to vehicles on a first-come, first-served basis. Still, respecting these makeshift markers has been accepted by citizens as a common courtesy during snowstorms.

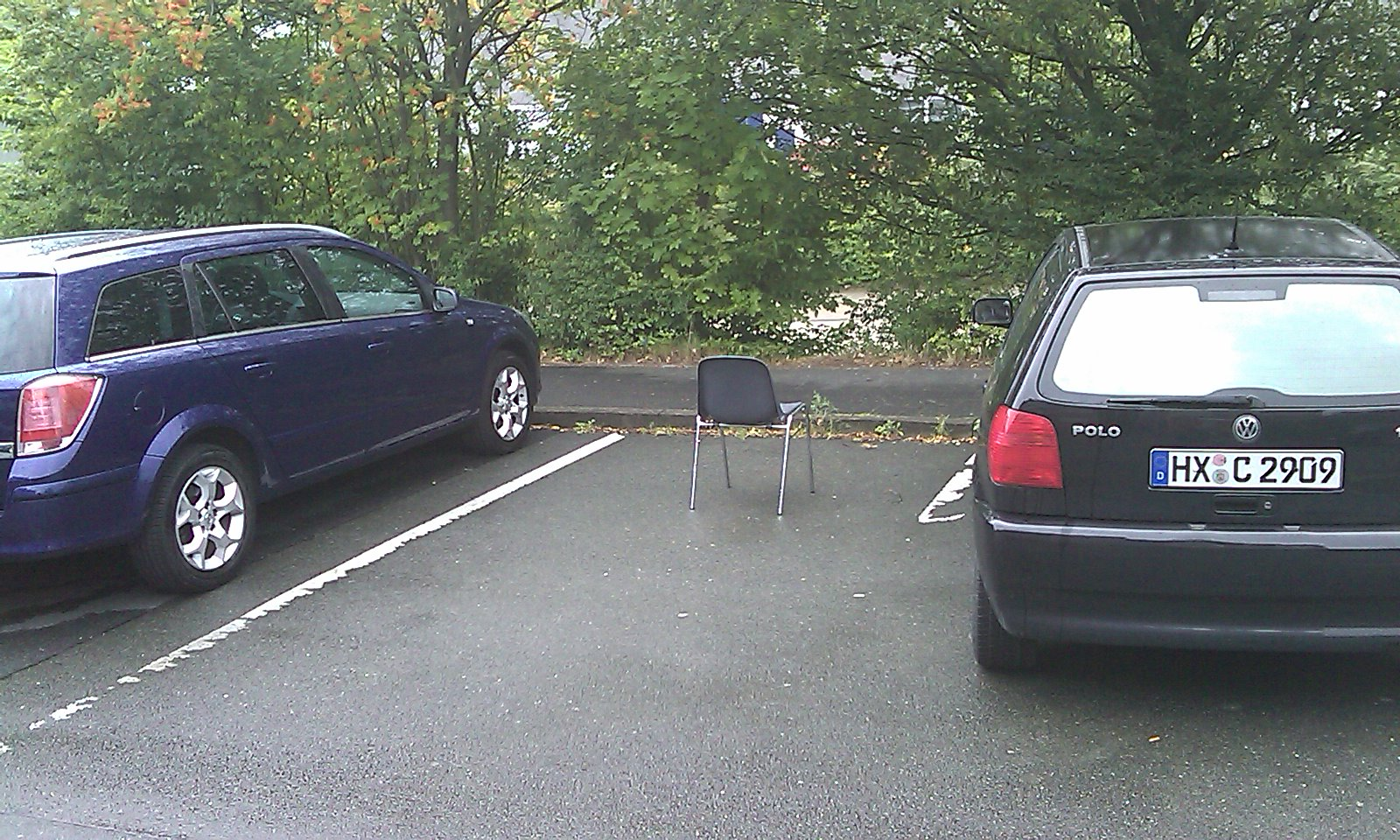
Parking chair placed prior to a snowstorm

While use is year-round, it is a particularly time-honored tradition in heavy snowfall accumulation, when a resident who digs out their spot on the street essentially declares ownership, which often goes unchallenged by neighbors for fear of retribution.

The idea of the practice is that the person reserves the space from which they have freed their vehicle for future parking during the remainder of the storm and as long as snow remains on the ground. It is generally a Lockean recognition that the effort of the physical exertion of digging provides an entitlement to the space where the vehicle was previously located. But in some instances, spaces get reserved in this fashion even before a snowstorm starts.

== Origin ==
The practice is common throughout areas of the United States susceptible to large amounts of snow and where curbside parking on residential streets is the norm, especially in the Northeast.

The items used have sometimes been referred to as the Pittsburgh Parking Chair, due to their common use in Pittsburgh and its nearby suburbs. Pittsburgh is a very hilly area, with houses very close together, and many older neighborhoods predate cars, having narrow streets with no driveways to park in and parking on only one side of the street. While such ad hoc parking restrictions have no legal standing in the city of Pittsburgh, common and long standing community tradition supports their use. As the parking chair is part of the culture of the city, local police generally turn a blind eye to these impromptu markers, which under legal jurisdiction, technically qualify as "abandoned furniture".

Photographic evidence of the tradition has been found dating back at least to the 1950s. It is believed that the practice existed earlier, as the number of vehicles on residential streets has exceeded the number of available spaces. The origin of this practice may be outside the United States, as it is also a common practice in southern Italy, and with other objects in the United Kingdom.

== Legality ==
The practice has been outlawed in some places, including the city of Washington, D.C., where enforcement is strict and violators are ticketed. Some places specifically prohibit the practice, with levels of enforcement that vary. Sanctions against violators may include fines and confiscation of the markers. Other places either do not enforce or make legal allowances for this activity.

In Baltimore, after the 2010 blizzards on February 5–6 and February 9–10, Mayor Stephanie Rawlings-Blake announced that the city would not enforce an existing ban on the practice. She said that it could not be stopped, saying that it was a local tradition and that it would be "like telling people they can't say 'Hon'".

Some places, including Pittsburgh, do not place legal sanctions against those engaging in the practice, but make clear that anyone has the right to claim an informal space that was reserved by someone else for their own vehicle, regardless of courtesy. However, it is a general practice around the city to respect the markers of others. In 1994, Police in Dormont, a suburb of Pittsburgh, confiscated the markers from 200 spaces due to excessive complaints. Pittsburgh retailers sell novelty "Official Parking Chairs".

In Boston, the law prohibits residents from saving the spaces they clear for longer than 48 hours from the moment a snow emergency is declared to be over. However, they are outright banned in certain neighborhoods of the city, such as the South End.

In Aldan, Pennsylvania, the police chief confiscated all markers that were placed following the blizzards of 2010. He stated that he was enforcing a local ordinance in doing so.

In Chicago, the "dibs" practice is illegal under §10-28-070. Though dibs incidents are traditionally unenforced in Chicago, there are notable police report rates for vandalism incidents involving saved parking spaces. On March 2, 2021, the Chicago Department of Streets and Sanitation (DSS) began removing "Dibs" objects along with household trash. WBEZ, Chicago's local NPR station, created a sign for residents to post that cites the Chicago statute prohibiting dibs.

== Criticism ==
Most dense residential urban streets do not have enough parking spaces to accommodate the number of drivers who desire them. When residents use parking chairs to claim spaces, they reduce the parking available to other drivers, by removing the efficiency that first-come, first-served public parking normally provides. Furthermore, guest and work vehicles are discouraged from using available spaces when needed out of fear of retribution. This means that public property is being illegally claimed by an individual for their own private use.

== Disorderly behavior, vandalism, and violence ==
In Chicago, people who call "dibs" on a parking spot have been reported for vandalizing vehicles parked where they called "dibs". The most common form of retaliation is slashed tires, followed by broken car windows, cars keyed or dented, and broken mirrors. Other forms of documented retaliation include broken windshields, spray painting the car, and severing the car's brake line. An NPR investigation found that among 64 police reports for dibs-related vandalism after three big snowstorms, just one resulted in an arrest.

Victims often say a parking chair was not in the spot at the time they parked, or that they were unaware of Chicago's "dibs" practices. Sometimes the vandalism takes place when the victim parked for just a few minutes. For example, one police report states, "Victim related that he parked his vehicle down the street from Acero Elementary to get his child into school. He moved some boxes that someone had put there after shoveling out a parking space. Victim stated that he had every intention of putting them back after dropping off his child. Unknown offender had spray painted the door handles and rear license plate."

Even in cities where parking chairs are generally tolerated, such as Pittsburgh, local police make it clear that public street parking cannot legally be reserved. Citizens are explicitly discouraged from using objects to block parking spaces. Because parking chairs are considered abandoned furniture, they may be removed at any time. It is common for municipalities to forcibly remove the offending objects from time to time.

Some disputes over parking savers have resulted in physical altercations, and at least one has resulted in a stabbing.

== See also ==
- Snow emergency
- Snow removal
