= Simpatico (The Vandermark 5 album) =

Studio album by The Vandermark 5
- Released: 1999
- Recorded: December 12 & 13, 1998
- Studio: Airwave, Chicago
- Genre: Jazz
- Length: 65:06
- Label: Atavistic
- Producer: The Vandermark 5

Ken Vandermark chronology
Live in Wels & Chicago, 1998 (1999)	Simpatico (1999)	Live at the Glenn Miller Café (1999)

Simpatico is an album by American jazz reedist Ken Vandermark, which was recorded in 1998 and released on Atavistic. It was the third recording of the Vandermark 5, the first with Dave Rempis replacing former saxophonist Mars Williams.

== Reception ==
Professional ratings
Review scores
Source	Rating
AllMusic	4/5 stars
The Penguin Guide to Jazz	4/4 stars

In his review for AllMusic, Thom Jurek states "Using American jazzmen for their spiritual inspiration and the European model of free jazz improv, Vandermark and company have come up with something entirely their own: a solid, gritty, soulful funk and squall band who holds within their collective grasp the souls of Sun Ra, Steve Lacy, Albert Ayler, and James Brown's JBs."

The Penguin Guide to Jazz notes that "Rempis is a surprise substitute for Williams, and since he plays only alto it slightly narrows the tonal palette - though this supercharges and superbly focuset set is surely the group's best to date."

== Track listing ==
All compositions by Ken Vandermark

1. "Vent" – 6:57
2. "Fact and Fiction" – 8:48
3. "Full Deck" – 5:17
4. "Anywhere Else" – 9:54
5. "STHLM" – 9:06
6. "Cover to Cover" – 8:26
7. "Point Blank" – 8:37
8. "Encino" – 8:01

== Personnel ==
- Jeb Bishop – trombone, guitar
- Kent Kessler – bass
- Tim Mulvenna – drums
- Dave Rempis – alto sax
- Ken Vandermark – tenor sax, bass clarinet, B♭ clarinet
