= Mike Reed (musician) =

- Born: May 26, 1974 (age 52)
- Origin: Bielefeld, Germany
- Genres: Jazz
- Occupation: Musician
- Instrument: Drums
- Years active: 1997–present
- Labels: 482 Music, Astral Spirits, Cuneiform
- Website: Official Website

Mike Reed (born May 26, 1974) is an American jazz drummer, bandleader, composer and music presenter.

== Career ==
Reed was born in Bielefeld, Germany, in 1974, but raised in Evanston, Illinois north of Chicago. He returned to Chicago in the 1990s after majoring in English and psychology at the University of Dayton in Ohio. He played with David Boykin Expanse, Rob Mazurek's Exploding Star Orchestra, and the Josh Berman Quartet. He leads the quintet Loose Assembly and the quartet People, Places & Things, with whom he recorded several albums on the 482 Music label.

In 2000 he and cornetist Josh Berman started the Sunday Transmission music series at the Hungry Brain bar in Chicago in 2000. He helped start Downtown Sound music series, a free weekly concert program in Chicago's Millennium Park that has included indie rock, world music, and contemporary soul. He is a founding director of the Pitchfork Music Festival in Chicago and until 2025 joined the committee that programs the annual Chicago Jazz Festival. Since 2013 he has been the founder and director of the Constellation performing arts venue in Chicago, originally as its for-profit (nominally) owner and then, from 2018, as its nonprofit organization president. Then in 2016 he bought and reopened the nearby Hungry Brain bar, which had closed in 2014, continuing to present live music there, as of 2024. He is a member of the Association for the Advancement of Creative Musicians (AACM) in Chicago and served as vice-chair between 2009 and 2011.

In 2009 while on their European tour, the four members of Reed's band People, Places, and Things - two of them African-American - were caught in a Neo-Nazi rally in the Czech Republic, putting their lives in danger. The police found the band members and provided them with a safe house and passage to Kraków, Poland.

Reed is the founder of the annual Sound & Gravity music festival, taking place in Chicago's Roscoe Village, which features an international retinue of experimental musicians each September. In 2026, Sounds & Gravity will compete with the Chicago Jazz Festival, where Reed used to serve as co-programmer.

== Personal life ==
Reed is a non-practicing Catholic.

== Discography ==
=== As leader/co-leader ===
Release year	Title	Label	Personnel/Notes
2006	In the Context of	482 Music	Duets with Jeff Parker (guitar), Nicole Mitchell (flute), Jim Baker (piano)
2007	Last Year's Ghost	482 Music	Loose Assembly with Josh Abrams (bass), Jason Adasiewicz (vibes), Tomeka Reid (cello), Greg Ward (alto saxophone)
2008	Proliferation	482 Music	People, Places & Things with Greg Ward (alto saxophone), Tim Haldeman (tenor saxophone), Jason Roebke (bass)
2008	The Speed of Change	482 Music	Loose Assembly with Nicole Mitchell (flute), Josh Abrams (bass), Jason Adasiewicz (vibes), Tomeka Reid (cello), Greg Ward (alto saxophone)
2009	About Us	482 Music	People, Places & Things with Greg Ward (alto saxophone), Tim Haldeman (tenor saxophone), Jason Roebke (bass), David Boykin (tenor saxophone), Jeb Bishop (trombone), Jeff Parker (guitar)
2010	Stories and Negotiations	482 Music	People, Places & Things with Greg Ward (alto saxophone), Tim Haldeman (tenor saxophone), Jason Roebke (bass), Art Hoyle (trumpet, flugelhorn), Ira Sullivan (tenor saxophone), Julian Priester, Jeb Bishop (trombone)
2010	Empathetic Parts	482 Music	Loose Assembly with Josh Abrams (bass), Jason Adasiewicz (vibes), Tomeka Reid (cello), Greg Ward (alto saxophone), Roscoe Mitchell (alto saxophone, soprano saxophone, flute)
2011	It Only Happened at Night	482 Music	My Silence with Jason Stein (bass clarinet), Nick Butcher (electronics, turntable, guitar, keyboards)
2012	Clean on the Corner	482 Music	People, Places & Things with Greg Ward (alto saxophone), Tim Haldeman (tenor saxophone), Jason Roebke (bass), Craig Taborn (piano), Josh Berman (cornet)
2012	New Myth/Old Science	Cuneiform	Living by Lanterns co-led with Reed and Jason Adasiewicz
2013	Second Cities Volume 1	482 Music	People, Places & Things with Greg Ward (alto saxophone), Tim Haldeman (tenor saxophone), Jason Roebke (bass), Ab Baars (tenor saxophone and clarinet), Eric Boeren (cornet), Joost Buis (trombone), Guus Janssen, Oscar Jan Hoogland (piano), Michael Moore (alto and clarinet), Felicity Provan (trumpet)
2014	In Pursuit of Magic	482 Music	Duo with Roscoe Mitchell (reeds)
2015	A New Kind of Dance	482 Music	People, Places & Things with Greg Ward (alto saxophone), Tim Haldeman (tenor saxophone), Jason Roebke (bass), Marquis Hill (trumpet), Matthew Shipp (piano)
2015	Artifacts	482 Music	Artifacts with Nicole Mitchell (flute, electronics), Tomeka Reid (cello)
2017	Flesh & Bone	482 Music	People, Places & Things Greg Ward (alto saxophoneophone), Tim Haldeman (tenor saxophone), Jason Roebke (bass), Mike Reed (drums) with Ben Lamar Gay (cornet), Jason Stein (clarinet), Marvin Tate (words)
2021	Sun Beams of Shimmering Light	Astral Spirits	Douglas R. Ewart (reeds) and Wadada Leo Smith (trumpet)
2021	...and then there's this	Astral Spirits Records	Artifacts with Nicole Mitchell (flute, electronics), Tomeka Reid (cello)
2024	The Separatist Party	Astral Spirits, WeJazz	Ben Lamar Gay (cornet), Cooper Crain (guitar), Dan Quinlivan (synthesizer), Rob Frye (reeds), Marvin Tate (voice)

=== As sideperson ===
Release year	Leader	Title	Label
2010	Jason Adasiewicz	Sun Rooms	Delmark
2011	Jason Adasiewicz	Spacer	Delmark
2014	Jason Adasiewicz	From the Region	Delmark
2008	Bill Dixon	Bill Dixon with Exploding Star Orchestra	Thrill Jockey
2007	Rob Mazurek (Exploding Star Orchestra)	We Are All from Somewhere Else	Thrill Jockey
2010	Rob Mazurek (Exploding Star Orchestra)	Stars Have Shapes	Delmark
2010	Rob Mazurek (Exploding Star Orchestra)	Matter Anti-Matter	RogueArt
2014	Jason Roebke	High Red Center	Delmark
