= Rows and Rows =

Studio album by Keefe Jackson and Jason Adasiewicz
- Released: 2016
- Recorded: June 12 and 13, 2015
- Studios: Huron, Chicago, Illinois
- Genre: Free jazz
- Length: 41:59
- Labels: Delmark Records; DE 5024
- Producer: Robert G. Koester

Jason Adasiewicz chronology
From the Region (2014)	Rows and Rows (2016)	Roy's World (2023)

Rows and Rows is an album by saxophonist and bass clarinetist Keefe Jackson and vibraphonist Jason Adasiewicz. It was recorded during June 2015 at Huron in Chicago, Illinois, and was released in 2016 by Delmark Records. The album features nine original compositions, six of which were written specifically for the session, while the remaining three are older pieces re-imagined for two players.

== Reception ==
Professional ratings
Review scores
Source	Rating
DownBeat	3.5/5 stars
The Free Jazz Collective	4.5/5 stars
Tom Hull – on the Web	B+

In a review for DownBeat, Peter Margasak wrote: "Patience, empathy and a deep affinity radiate from every track, like two good friends getting together to shoot the breeze. Most pals don’t speak with such Shakespearean elegance."

Clifford Allen, writing for The New York City Jazz Record, stated: "Jackson, despite a fair allegiance to free play, is an improviser whose historical grasp is abundantly clear... Adasiewicz volleys between cascading vaults and the snappy, glassine shifts of a drummer's telepathy, making Rows and Rows a duo delivering plenty of harmonic and rhythmic rewards."

The Free Jazz Collective's Tom Burris commented: "the big surprise here is the meshing of composition and improvisation into such completeness that it's impossible to tell when composition ends and improvisation begins... You won't get tired of the tunes... They sneak up on you. You don't realize their strength until you've heard them multiple times. And you will definitely listen to them multiple times."

Derek Taylor of Dusted Magazine described the album as "two players challenging and reinforcing each other in equal measure, their instruments braiding and eliding in an alluring exchange of ideas that occupies the span of an LP and is all the better for the focused brevity."

In an article for Point of Departure, Troy Collins noted that the album "uncannily evokes the vanguard spirit of post-war Blue Note sides waxed by innovators like Eric Dolphy, Andrew Hill and Jackie Mclean," and remarked: "Jackson and Adasiewicz demonstrate the sort of congenial interplay that is rarely – if ever easily – heard among the density of larger configurations. Rows and Rows is a sterling example of their finely-tuned camaraderie and its applicability to the duet tradition."

Writing for Jazz Right Now, John Morrison commented: "Despite its minimal instrumentation used throughout the album, the duo is never found lacking, proposing and elaborating on a wealth of fertile ideas throughout the course of nine relatively short compositions. Jackson & Adasiewicz create a miraculous space in which clever, melodic composition is enriched by bold and tasteful playing."

== Track listing ==
1. "Caballo Ballo" (Keefe Jackson) – 5:23
2. "Questioned, Understood, Possessed" (Keefe Jackson) – 3:43
3. "Where's Mine" (Jason Adesiewicz) – 4:39
4. "A Rose Heading" (Keefe Jackson) – 4:24
5. "Swap" (Keefe Jackson) – 4:05
6. "Rows and Rows" (Keefe Jackson) – 4:01
7. "Putting It On, Taking It Off" (Jason Adesiewicz) – 3:34
8. "Cannon from the Nothing Suite" (Keefe Jackson) – 6:03
9. "Thunder Cooker" (Jason Adesiewicz) – 6:07

== Personnel ==
- Keefe Jackson – tenor saxophone, bass clarinet
- Jason Adasiewicz – vibraphone
