= New Myth/Old Science =

Studio album by Living by Lanterns
- Released: 2012
- Recorded: September 3 & 5, 2011
- Studio: Electrical Audio, Chicago
- Genre: Jazz
- Length: 44:30
- Label: Cuneiform

Mike Reed chronology
Clean on the Corner (2012)	New Myth/Old Science (2012)	Second Cities Volume 1 (2013)

Jason Adasiewicz chronology
Spacer (2011)	New Myth/Old Science (2012)	From the Region (2014)

New Myth/Old Science is an album by Living by Lanterns, a Chicago-based project with invited guest musicians from New York co-led by drummer Mike Reed and vibraphonist Jason Adasiewicz, which was formed specifically to play arrangements of rare Sun Ra tunes. The album was recorded in 2011 and released on Cuneiform.

== Background ==
Reed was commissioned by Experimental Sound Studio to create a performance that in some way used or was inspired by material contained in the 700 hours of the Sun Ra/El Saturn Audio Collection, a vast assortment of rehearsal tapes, masters, live recordings, speeches and poetry left behind by Sun Ra and manager Alton Abraham. Rather than a Sun Ra tribute, the idea was of creating new music using someone’s un-finished, un-wanted and abandoned material. The band is basically composed of Reed's group Loose Assembly, and a collection of New York-based musicians that have a similar artistic trajectories.

== Music ==
The material is derived from one rehearsal tape marked “NY 1961” featuring Ra on electric piano, John Gilmore on tenor sax and Ronnie Boykins on bass. Stretching just over one hour in length the tape seems more of a stream of consciousness songwriting session with few details worked out but many ideas played through. Some of these ideas were teased out, hugely expanded upon and turned into the pieces heard on New Myth/Old Science.

== Reception ==
Professional ratings
Review scores
Source	Rating
Down Beat	4/5 stars
All About Jazz	4/5 stars

The Down Beat review by Peter Margasak states "The music swings with ever-changing harmonies and instrumental hues, creating mobile, detail-rich settings for inspired improvisations that emerge from the din naturally rather than dutifully."

The All About Jazz review by Troy Collins notes "This impressive summit meeting between Chicago and New York's finest young improvisers transcends mere repertory however; Reed and Adasiewicz's decision to avoid slavish homage provided them the rare opportunity to create brand new music from another artist's unfinished material."

In a review for JazzTimes, Lloyd Sachs says "An understated and unexpected streak of klezmer animates the finale, 'Old Science,' which, like most of the songs, is in the end less a reflection of Sun Ra than a tonally rich distillation of his visionary sound."

== Track listing ==
Composed and arranged by Jason Adasiewicz and Mike Reed based on unpublished compositions and improvisations by Sun Ra

1. "New Myth" – 1:14
2. "Think Tank" – 11:40
3. "2000 West Erie" – 5:38
4. "Shadow Boxer's Delight" – 6:58
5. "Forget B" – 6:47
6. "Grow Lights" – 6:20
7. "Old Science" – 5:53

== Personnel ==
- Greg Ward – alto sax
- Taylor Ho Bynum – cornet
- Ingrid Laubrock – tenor sax
- Tomeka Reid – cello
- Mary Halvorson – guitar
- Jason Adasiewicz - vibraphone
- Joshua Abrams – bass
- Tomas Fujiwara – drums
- Mike Reed – drums, electronics
- Nick Butcher– electronics on 1 & 4
