= Deep Telling =

Studio album by Joe Morris + DKV Trio
- Released: 1999
- Recorded: April 30, 1998
- Studio: Überstudio, Chicago
- Genre: Jazz
- Length: 60:13
- Label: Okka Disk
- Producer: Ken Vandermark, Joe Morris

Joe Morris chronology
A Cloud of Black Birds (1998)	Deep Telling (1999)	Many Rings (1999)

Ken Vandermark chronology
Stumble (1998)	Deep Telling (1999)	Funky-Do! (1999)

Deep Telling is an album by American jazz guitarist Joe Morris with the DKV Trio recorded in 1998 and released on Okka Disk. The DKV Trio is a band composed of drummer Hamid Drake, bassist Kent Kessler, and saxophonist Ken Vandermark. The whole quartet plays together only on three collective improvisations, on the other five tracks the musicians split off into a variety of duo and trio lineups.

== Reception ==
Professional ratings
Review scores
Source	Rating
Allmusic	4/5 stars

In her review for AllMusic, Joslyn Layne claims "There is a natural intuition and understanding between Morris, percussionist Hamid Drake, bassist Kent Kessler, and tenor saxophonist Ken Vandermark that belies the fact that the Chicago group and Morris played together only twice before stepping into the studio in spring 1998."

The JazzTimes review by Peter Margasak states "I don't think Morris and DKV make the best match, but the interest level never falters. At certain times they sound natural, yet even when they don't, they make the struggle utterly compelling."

== Track listing ==
All compositions by Drake/Kessler/Vandermark/Morris except as indicated

1. "Standing Here" – 12:15
2. "Bit Tenet" (Kessler/Morris) – 4:20
3. "Hollow Curve" (Drake/Kessler/Morris) – 5:59
4. "Narrative" – 7:33
5. "Infix" (Kessler/Morris) – 3:27
6. "Breathe Easily" (Drake/Vandermark/Morris) – 4:47
7. "To and From the Core" (Kessler/Vandermark/Morris) – 3:17
8. "Telling Suite" – 18:35

== Personnel ==
- Hamid Drake – drums
- Kent Kessler – bass
- Ken Vandermark – tenor sax
- Joe Morris – guitar
