= Other Violets =

Live album by The Engines
- Released: 2013
- Recorded: May 15, 2011
- Venue: Hungry Brain, Chicago
- Genre: Jazz
- Length: 67:29
- Label: Not Two

Dave Rempis chronology
Mechanisms (2012)	Other Violets (2013)	Mi Casa es en Fuego (2013)

Other Violets is the third album by the free jazz quartet The Engines, consisting of saxophonist Dave Rempis, trombonist Jeb Bishop, bassist Nate McBride and drummer Tim Daisy. The album documents a collaboration with Danish reedist John Tchicai, which was recorded live at Chicago's Hungry Brain in 2011 and released on the Polish Not Two label.

== Reception ==
The All About Jazz review by Glenn Astarita states "With a focused game-plan, the musicians execute a vastly expressionistic series of improvisational dialogues, but all pieces contain structure, albeit tinged with loose grooves and micro-motifs, elevating the excitement level throughout."

In his review for JazzTimes, Steve Greenlee says "Other Violets is probably not among the greatest moments for any of these five guys, but it’s a decent set and a worthy document of what was surely a memorable night."

The Point of Departure review by Bill Shoemaker notes "A thoroughly collaborative effort, Other Violets is more than a fitting tribute to an artist who deserves many – it’s a damn good record."

== Track listing ==
1. "High and Low" (Rempis) / "Strate" (McBride) – 15:14
2. "Gloxinia" (Daisy) – 13:37
3. "Cool Copy" (Tchicai) / "Looking" (Bishop) – 19:32
4. "Super Orgasmic Life" (Tchicai) – 8:32
5. "Planet" (Bishop) – 10:34

== Personnel ==
- John Tchicai - tenor sax, flute
- Dave Rempis - alto sax, tenor sax
- Jeb Bishop - trombone
- Nate McBride - bass
- Tim Daisy - drums
