= Spectral (Dave Rempis album) =

Studio album by Dave Rempis, Darren Johnston, Larry Ochs
- Released: 2014
- Recorded: May 23 & 25, 2012
- Studio: Berkeley Arts, Berkeley, California & Catacombs, San Francisco
- Genre: Jazz
- Length: 55:32
- Label: Aerophonic
- Producer: Dave Rempis

Dave Rempis chronology
Aphelion (2014)	Spectral (2014)	From Wolves to Whales (2015)

Spectral is the debut release by the free improvising trio consisting of saxophonist Dave Rempis alongside Bay Area improvisers Darren Johnston and Larry Ochs, which was recorded in 2012 and released on Rempis' Aerophonic label.

== Background ==
The trio came together in the fall of 2011, when Rempis journeyed to the West Coast to discover the Bay Area scene. Trumpeter Johnston, a frequent visitor to Chicago and collaborator of Rempis, suggested this lineup for a performance at Oakland’s Uptown Nightclub. Rempis returned to the Bay Area in the spring of 2012 for two more concerts and a studio session. Spectral was the result of that visit.

== Reception ==
Professional ratings
Review scores
Source	Rating
Down Beat	4/5 stars

The Down Beat review by Bill Meyer says "They wield the full range—from lush long tones to abrasive cries to percussive pops—to create music that imparts both the thrill of instant creation and the satisfaction of elegant construction."

The All About Jazz review by Eyal Hareuveni notes "The trio anticipates each others' moves to combine sonic sensibilities and patiently accumulate into a coherent, loosely structured piece."

== Track listing ==
All compositions by Rempis/Johnston/Ochs

1. "Traction" – 8:49
2. "Iterated Integrals" – 7:29
3. "Wrinkle Wrankle" – 10:15
4. "How It Started" – 6:07
5. "Snaggletooth Tussle" – 4:50
6. "Cheek and Bones" – 6:45
7. "The Drop" – 11:17

== Personnel ==
- Dave Rempis - alto sax
- Darren Johnston - trumpet
- Larry Ochs - tenor sax, sopranino sax
