= Mental Shake =

Live album by Peter Brötzmann, Jason Adasiewicz, John Edwards, and Steve Noble
- Released: 2014
- Recorded: August 12, 2013
- Venue: Cafe Oto, London
- Genre: Free jazz
- Length: 39:16
- Label: Otoroku; ROKU010

Peter Brötzmann chronology
I Am Here Where Are You (2013)	Mental Shake (2014)	Whatthefuckdoyouwant (2014)

Mental Shake is a live album by saxophonist Peter Brötzmann (whose last name is spelled "Broetzmann" on the cover), vibraphonist Jason Adasiewicz, double bassist John Edwards, and drummer Steve Noble. Consisting of a single 39-minute track, it was recorded on August 12, 2013, at Cafe Oto in London, and was released in 2014 by the Otoroku label.

== Reception ==
Professional ratings
Review scores
Source	Rating
All About Jazz	5/5 stars
The Free Jazz Collective - Grigg	4/5 stars
The Free Jazz Collective - Schray	4.5/5 stars
Jazzwise	4/5 stars

In a 5-star review for All About Jazz, John Sharpe wrote: "Brötzmann launches the single set long piece with his customary banshee wail, cutting through an unusually dense wall of sound in which the vibes evoke the demented tolling of church bells to signal mayhem afoot. However the intensity subsides at regular intervals to allow the intricate interplay between Edwards and Noble to shine through."

The Free Jazz Collective's Matthew Grigg noted that "much of the feel of this record is of the trio playing behind Broetzmann, lending an almost classically 'leader and side-men' sensation to the date." FJC reviewer Martin Schray stated that the album is "absolutely entertaining and can give you pure joy," and commented: "there are parts to which you could even dance... Brötzmann, the old snake charmer on acid, sometimes sounds as if he was 30 again."

Daniel Spicer of Jazzwise remarked: "On the face of it, you'd be forgiven for expecting this collaboration not to work, but it does – admirably... When bass, drums and sax tumble into boiling turmoil, Adasiewicz floats over the top with an echoing, cosmic shimmer, as though glancing up from the furious engine to navigate by the stars... It's not often you get to eavesdrop on a new language being born."

Writing for Dusted Magazine, Derek Taylor wrote: "The music sprawls forth in a single, uninterrupted bricolage of sound... Brötzmann... yields little in unvarnished intensity or vibrato-saturated squalls largely leaving Adasiewicz to fill the sound stage out with luminous accents and ringing, angular ornamentations while Edwards and Noble keep a robust and textured array of rhythms churning and surging at their flanks."

In an article for Something Else!, Sammy Stein called the album "sheer delight," and commented: "It is one of those rare recordings where a sense of delight and joy pervades right the way through. There are no 'numbers,' no pre-determined breaks or arrangements — just four musicians at the height of their game, playing together and providing beautiful, delicious entertainment. This is what free jazz is all about. Period."

Magnet's Bill Meyer included the album in his list of the ten best jazz/improv releases of 2014.

== Track listing ==
1. "Mental Shake" – 39:16

== Personnel ==
- Peter Brötzmann – alto saxophone, tenor saxophone, B♭ clarinet, tárogató
- Jason Adasiewicz – vibraphone
- John Edwards – double bass
- Steve Noble – drums
