= Live in Wels & Chicago, 1998 =

Live album by DKV Trio
- Released: 1999
- Recorded: CD 1: November 8, 1998; CD 2: November 20 & 21, 1998
- Venue: CD 1: Alter Schl8hof, Wels; CD 2:Velvet Lounge, Chicago
- Genre: Jazz
- Length: CD 1: 43:55; CD 2: 73:09
- Label: Okka Disk
- Producer: Ken Vandermark

Ken Vandermark chronology
Straight Lines (1999)	Live in Wels & Chicago, 1998 (1999)	Simpatico (1999)

alternative cover

Live in Wels & Chicago, 1998 is a double album by the DKV Trio, composed of drummer Hamid Drake, bassist Kent Kessler and reedist Ken Vandermark. The first CD was recorded live at the "Music Unlimited 98" Festival in Wels, while the second was recorded a few days later at the Velvet Lounge, the Chicago club owned by saxophonist Fred Anderson. The album was released on Okka Disk. All the music is improvised but the first disc is a six pieces suite based on Don Cherry's "Complete Communion'".

== Reception ==
Professional ratings
Review scores
Source	Rating
AllMusic	4.5/5 stars
The Penguin Guide to Jazz	3.5/4 stars

In her review for AllMusic, Joslyn Layne states "These live recordings document some of the exciting - and engaging - live improvisations that make the DKV Trio one of the top groups in free jazz of the late 1990s and beyond."

The Penguin Guide to Jazz notes that "the Wels set, basically framed around Don Cherry's 'Complete Communion Suite', is a stunning example of free repertory, the original materials ingeniously transplanted to this situation."

The JazzTimes review by Peter Margasak says "Since Vandermark is perpetually searching for ideas to precipitate inspired improvisation, Cherry's masterpiece makes plenty of sense; it was essentially the first extended work of multi-thematic free jazz."

== Track listing ==
All compositions by Drake/Kessler/Vandermark except the theme "Complete Comunnion" by Don Cherry

Wels CD:
Complete Communion Suite

1. "Part 1" – 7:12
2. "Part 2" – 4:58
3. "Part 3" – 13:53
4. "Part 4" – 4:17
5. "Part 5" – 9:22
6. "Memory Sketch" – 4:10

Chicago CD:

1. "Open Door" – 30:52
2. "Blues for Tomorrow" – 19:12
3. "Burning Sky" – 23:05

== Personnel ==
- Hamid Drake - drums
- Kent Kessler - bass
- Ken Vandermark - tenor sax
