= Hunter-Gatherers (album) =

Live album by Dave Rempis
- Released: 2007
- Recorded: April 11, 2006
- Venue: Hunter-Gatherer, Columbia, South Carolina
- Genre: Jazz
- Length: 96:54
- Label: 482 Music

Dave Rempis chronology
Stagger (2006)	Hunter-Gatherers (2007)	The Engines (2007)

Hunter-Gatherers is a double album by American jazz saxophonist Dave Rempis, named after the Columbia, South Carolina venue where it was recorded live in 2006, and released on 482 Music. It was the third release from The Rempis Percussion Quartet, which features bassist Anton Hatwich and two drummers: Tim Daisy and Frank Rosaly.

== Reception ==
Professional ratings
Review scores
Source	Rating
The Penguin Guide to Jazz Recordings	4/4 stars

The All About Jazz review by Jeff Stockton states "Hunter-Gatherers spreads ninety-six minutes of music over two discs, and is a testament to the boundless creativity and seemingly inexhaustible energy of this youthful band."

The JazzTimes review by Chris Kelsey says "Rempis demonstrates that he is indeed interested in a measure of refinement, which he accomplishes without compromising energy, expression or intensity" but notes "As a creative artifact, this is a minor document that does not necessarily merit release."

In his review for Point of Departure, Brian Morton states "This would have made a very decent single CD, one of those occasions where value for money isn’t matched with consistent quality throughout. That said, Rempis has my vote for the immediate future, or rather his group does."

The Penguin Guide to Jazz Recordings says that the album shows Rempis at his most exciting, and that the group investigates a new relationship between lead and rhythm instruments.

== Track listing ==
All compositions by Rempis/Hatwich/Daisy/Rosaly

Disc One:

1. "A Night at the Ranch Part One" – 18:29
2. "The Bus and the Canyon" – 27:28

Disc Two:

1. "More Green Than Giraffe" – 23:25
2. "Black Book" – 11:47
3. "A Night at the Ranch Part Two" – 8:47
4. "Larks and Loons" – 6:58

== Personnel ==
- Dave Rempis - alto sax, tenor sax, baritone sax
- Anton Hatwich - bass
- Tim Daisy - percussion
- Frank Rosaly - percussion
