= The Speed of Change =

Studio album by Mike Reed
- Released: 2008
- Recorded: October 28–30, 2007
- Studio: Strobe Recording, Chicago
- Genre: Jazz
- Length: 42:37
- Label: 482 Music
- Producer: Mike Reed & Griffin Rodriguez

Mike Reed chronology
Proliferation (2008)	The Speed of Change (2008)	About Us (2009)

The Speed of Change is the second album by Loose Assembly, a quintet led by American jazz drummer Mike Reed featuring alto saxophonist Greg Ward, vibraphonist Jason Adasiewicz, cellist Tomeka Reid and bassist Josh Abrams. It was recorded in 2007 and released on 482 Music.

== Reception ==
Professional ratings
Review scores
Source	Rating
Down Beat	4/5 stars

The Down Beat review by Bill Meyer states "You can find elements from throughout the AACM’s history on the quintet’s second album, from Roscoe Mitchell’s distillations of pure sound to Nicole Mitchell’s widescreen, pan-generic orchestrations; but that’s simply foundation."

In a review for All About Jazz, Troy Collins says "A compelling album filled with myriad moods, The Speed of Change is a welcome reminder of the rich variety a capable composer can draw from an unorthodox instrumental line-up."

== Track listing ==
All compositions by Mike Reed except as indicated

1. "The Speed of Change" – 7:26
2. "Garvey's Ghost" (Max Roach) – 4:41
3. "Ground Swell" (Loose Assembly) – 3:22
4. "Tezetaye Antchi Lidj" (Mulatu Astatke) – 7:17
5. "X" (Adasiewicz, Ward) – 4:04
6. "Soul Stirrer" – 6:40
7. "Exit Strategy" – 6:41
8. "Picking Up Greta" – 2:26

== Personnel ==
- Greg Ward – alto sax
- Tomeka Reid – cello
- Jason Adasiewicz - vibraphone
- Josh Abrams – bass
- Mike Reed – drums, percussion
- Nicole Mitchell – voice on 2, flute and voice on 8
