= Rip Tear Crunch =

Studio album by Dave Rempis
- Released: 2006
- Recorded: February 27 & 28, 2005
- Studio: 3030, Chicago
- Genre: Jazz
- Length: 53:26
- Label: 482 Music

Dave Rempis chronology
| Circular Logic (2005) | Rip Tear Crunch (2006) | Stagger (2006) |

Rip Tear Crunch is an album by American jazz saxophonist Dave Rempis, which was recorded in 2005 and released on 482 Music. It was the studio debut by The Rempis Percussion Quartet, following the limited edition live recording Circular Logic.

== Reception ==
Professional ratings
Review scores
| Source | Rating |
|---|---|
| The Penguin Guide to Jazz Recordings | 3.5/4 stars |

The All About Jazz review by Troy Collins states "A mature and solid release, Rempis demonstrates a keen sensibility for leaving space in music that could easily be overburdened by endless vamping and excessive sonic clutter."

The JazzTimes review by Brian Gilmore notes "Like many albums in this genre that use unfamiliar lineups and utilize little if any melody, Rip Tear Crunch is alternately stark and dense."

== Track listing ==
All compositions by Rempis/Hatwich/Daisy/Rosaly

1. "Shreds" – 8:22
2. "Flank" – 4:38
3. "Rip Tear Crunch" – 26:05
4. "Dirty Work Can Be Clean Fun" – 2:05
5. "The Rub" – 12:16

== Personnel ==
- Dave Rempis - alto sax, tenor sax, baritone sax
- Anton Hatwich - bass
- Tim Daisy - percussion
- Frank Rosaly - percussion
