= Jason Adasiewicz =

American jazz vibraphonist and composer

- Born: October 14, 1977 (age 48); Wichita, Kansas, U.S.
- Genres: Jazz
- Occupation: Musician
- Instrument: Vibraphone
- Years active: 2000–present
- Labels: 482 Music, Cuneiform, Delmark
- Website: Official Website

Jason Adasiewicz (born October 14, 1977) is an American jazz vibraphonist and composer.

== Early life and education ==
Jason was born in Wichita, Kansas in 1977, but raised in Crystal Lake, Illinois. He studied jazz drums at DePaul University for three years.

== Career ==
Adasiewicz began playing the vibraphone after leaving school, first in the indie-rock scene around Chicago with bands like Pinetop Seven and the singer-songwriter Edith Frost.

In the early-2000s, Adasiewicz began his collaboration with cornetist Josh Berman and drummer Mike Reed. Since then he was worked in the Chicago jazz and improvisation scene with multiple bands, including Rob Mazurek’s Starlicker and Exploding Star Orchestra, Mike Reed’s Loose Assembly, Josh Berman and His Gang, Nicole Mitchell’s Ice Crystal, James Falzone’s Klang and Ken Vandermark’s Topology and Audio One.

Adasiewicz formed his Chicago-based jazz quintet, Rolldown, in 2004, while living in Madison. In 2008 he founded the trio Sun Rooms, with Nate McBride and Mike Reed.

In 2017, Adasiewicz composed his first original film score, for Roy's World: Barry Gifford's Chicago. It was released as an album in 2023 by Corbett vs. Dempsey. All About Jazz commented: "It is wildly, deliriously entertaining and so dynamic, beautiful and fun that you'll want to play it over and over again."

== Discography ==
=== As leader/co-leader ===
Release year	Title	Label	Personnel/Notes
2008	Rolldown	482 Music	Quintet with Josh Berman (cornet), Aram Shelton (alto sax, clarinet), Jason Roebke (bass), Frank Rosaly (drums)
2009	Varmint	Cuneiform	As the band Rolldown; with Josh Berman (cornet), Aram Shelton (alto sax, clarinet), Jason Roebke (bass), Frank Rosaly (drums)
2010	Sun Rooms	Delmark	Trio with Nate McBride (bass), Mike Reed (drums)
2011	Spacer	Delmark	As the band Sun Rooms; with Nate McBride (bass), Mike Reed (drums)
2012	New Myth/Old Science	Cuneiform	As the band Living by Lanterns; co-led by Adasiewicz and Mike Reed
2014	From the Region	Delmark	As the band Sun Rooms; with Ingebrigt Håker Flaten (bass), Mike Reed (drums)
2016	Rows and Rows	Delmark	Duo with Keefe Jackson (tenor sax)
2023	Roy's World	Corbett vs. Dempsey	Quintet with Joshua Abrams (bass), Josh Berman (cornet), Jonathan Doyle (saxes), and Hamid Drake (drums)

=== As sideman ===
Release year	Leader	Title	Label
2013	Joshua Abrams	Unknown Known	Delmark
2008	Jason Ajemian	The Art of Dying	Delmark
2014	Audio One	An International Report	Audiographic
2014	Audio One	The Midwest School	Audiographic
2015	Audio One	What Thomas Bernhard Saw	Audiographic
2009	Josh Berman	Old Idea	Delmark
2012	Josh Berman	There Now	Delmark
2014	Peter Brötzmann	Mental Shake	Otoroku
2008	Bill Dixon	Bill Dixon with Exploding Star Orchestra	Thrill Jockey
2006	Harris Eisenstadt	The Soul and Gone	482 Music
2007	Exploding Star Orchestra	We Are All From Somewhere Else	Thrill Jockey
2010	Exploding Star Orchestra	Stars Have Shapes	Delmark
2011	Darren Johnston	The Big Lift	Porto Franco
2009	Klang	Tea Music	Allos
2011	Klang	Other Doors	Allos
2012	Klang	Brooklyn Lines... Chicago Spaces	Allos
2006	Lucky 7	Farragut	Lakefront Digital
2009	Lucky 7	Pluto Junkyard	Clean Feed
2009	Rob Mazurek	Sound Is	Delmark
2009	Rob Mazurek	Skull Sessions	Cuneiform
2014	Dave McDonnell	The Dragon and the Griffin	New Atlantis
2015	Dave McDonnell	The Time Inside a Year	Delmark
2013	Nicole Mitchell	Aquarius	Delmark
2007	Mike Reed	Last Year's Ghost	482 Music
2008	Mike Reed	The Speed of Change	482 Music
2010	Mike Reed	Empathetic Parts	482 Music
2014	Jason Roebke	High Red Center	Delmark
2013	Frank Rosaly	Cicada Music	Delmark
2005	Aram Shelton	Arrive	482 Music
2011	Aram Shelton	There Was...	Clean Feed
2011	Starlicker	Double Demon	Delmark
2011	Ken Vandermark	Impressions of Po Music	Okka Disk
2013	Wheelhouse	Boss of the Plains	Aerophonic
