= From the Region =

Studio album by Jason Adasiewicz
- Released: 2014
- Recorded: December 12 & 13, 2013
- Studios: Electric Monkey, Amsterdam
- Genre: Jazz
- Length: 56:47
- Label: Delmark
- Producer: Robert G. Koester

Jason Adasiewicz chronology
New Myth/Old Science (2012)	From the Region (2014)	Rows and Rows (2016)

From the Region is an album by American jazz vibraphonist Jason Adasiewicz, which was recorded in 2013 and released on Delmark. It was the third album by his trio Sun Rooms, the first with Ingebrigt Håker Flaten replacing former bassist Nate McBride.

== Reception ==
Professional ratings
Review scores
Source	Rating
All About Jazz	4/5 stars
Down Beat	3.5/5 stars
Tom Hull – on the Web	B+

The Down Beat review by Carlo Wolff states "Adasiewicz, a man of Monkish wit, composes tunes that often start with an orthodox structure, but then devolve into free playing. This is inclusive music, its melodies as memorable as its rhythms are unpredictable."

The All About Jazz review by Marc Corroto says "Adasiewicz's From The Region is a power trio recording masquerading as a jazz band."

In a review for JazzTimes David Whiteis states "Adasiewicz’s lush harmonies, roomy echo, unforced attack and expansive, non-linear melodic/chordal structures evoke dreamlike soundscapes both warm and captivating."

The Point of Departure review by Troy Collins notes "A modernist at heart, Adasiewicz’s harmonically sophisticated approach builds upon the legacy of stylists like Walt Dickerson and Bobby Hutcherson."

== Track listing ==
All compositions by Jason Adasiewicz except as indicated

1. "Leeza" – 4:46
2. "Classic Route" – 5:43
3. "The Song I Wrote for Tonight" – 7:24
4. "Mae Flowers" – 3:58
5. "Mr. PB" – 4:53
6. "Two Comes One" – 6:09
7. "Old Sparky" – 5:32
8. "I Forgot the Words" (Mike Reed) – 3:22
9. "Cubane" – 5:02
10. "Just Talkin' To Myself" – 6:26
11. "Is a Bell a Rose" – 3:32

== Personnel ==
- Jason Adasiewicz - vibraphone
- Ingebrigt Håker Flaten – bass
- Mike Reed – drums
