= From Wolves to Whales =

Studio album by Nate Wooley, Dave Rempis, Pascal Niggenkemper, Chris Corsano
- Released: 2015
- Recorded: February 10, 2014
- Studios: Coral Sound, Long Island City
- Genre: Jazz
- Length: 51:59
- Label: Aerophonic
- Producer: Dave Rempis

Dave Rempis chronology
Aphelion (2014)	From Wolves to Whales (2015)	Worse for the Wear (2015)

From Wolves to Whales is the debut release by the free improvising quartet consisting of trumpeter Nate Wooley, saxophonist Dave Rempis, bassist Pascal Niggenkemper and drummer Chris Corsano, which was recorded in 2014 and released on Rempis' Aerophonic label. This first document of their work was made in the studio following three concerts in Manhattan and Brooklyn.

== Reception ==
Professional ratings
Review scores
Source	Rating
Down Beat	4/5 stars

The Down Beat review by Peter Margasak says "Each member of the quartet has all of the autonomy in the world, but they work marvelously together, shaping a truly collective endeavor."

The All About Jazz review by Glenn Astarita notes "With hustling cadences, energized soloing and all the customary trimmings, the band acutely morphs the improv platform with semi-structured song-forms."

In his review for Point of Departure, John Litweiler says "This quartet’s versatility enveloped in its senses of form shows that the freest kind of Chicago jazz – early Art Ensemble, Braxton, Jenkins – lives on."

== Track listing ==
All compositions by Wooley/Rempis/Niggenkemper/Corsano

1. "Slake" – 14:57
2. "Serpents Tooth" – 10:48
3. "Stand Up for Bastard" – 8:00
4. "Swingin' Apoplexy" – 7:59
5. "Count Me Out" – 10:15

== Personnel ==
- Nate Wooley - trumpet
- Dave Rempis - alto sax
- Pascal Niggenkemper - bass
- Chris Corsano - drums
