= Last Year's Ghost =

Studio album by Mike Reed
- Released: 2007
- Genre: Jazz
- Length: 45:29
- Label: 482 Music
- Producer: Mike Reed & Griffin Rodriguez

Mike Reed chronology
In the Context of (2006)	Last Year's Ghost (2007)	Proliferation (2008)

Last Year's Ghost is the debut album by Loose Assembly, a quintet led by American jazz drummer Mike Reed featuring alto saxophonist Greg Ward, vibraphonist Jason Adasiewicz, cellist Tomeka Reid and bassist Josh Abrams. It was released in 2007 on 482 Music. The recording started in 2005 and completed in 2006, but the original sessions were lost and the album is a re-creation of the lost recordings.

== Reception ==
Professional ratings
Review scores
Source	Rating
AllMusic	3.5/5 stars
The Penguin Guide to Jazz	3.5/4 stars

In his review for AllMusic, Michael G. Nastos says "It's a very interesting and accessible disc worth owning and listening closely to."

The Penguin Guide to Jazz notes that the album "has a highly distinctive sound, with the leader's accurate time-sense a key component on 'Day of the Head' and the later 'Ghost Writer', in double-waltz time." In the later The Penguin Jazz Guide they reflected "if ever a contemporary record grows with familiarity, this is it"

All About Jazz published several reviews: Troy Collins states "A brilliant debut, Last Year's Ghost merges the austere reverence of chamber music with the scalding intensity of Chicago's historically ebullient free jazz." Jerry D'Souza says "The album impresses with its blend of the improvised and the composed." Nic Jones notes "Each listen seems to bring new rewards, which makes this one something of a rarity in itself."

In a review for JazzTimes, Forrest Dylan Bryant states "A unique quintet lineup with alto sax, vibes, cello and bass wraps a dark, velvety texture around vaguely nostalgic ballads, and adds density to surging, uptempo grooves."

The Point of Departure review by Bill Shoemaker describes the album as "a well-designed collection of hook-filled tunes and atmospheric interludes" and concludes "Just a few more recordings like Last Year’s Ghost and Mike Reed will be in the first rank of living American bandleaders."

== Track listing ==
All compositions by Mike Reed except as indicated

1. "Flowers" (Loose Assembly) – 2:14
2. "Day of the Dead" – 7:13
3. "Old Souls" – 2:20
4. "Afterthoughts" – 6:32
5. "1974" (Loose Assembly) – 1:51
6. "The Entire State of Florida" – 7:34
7. "Exorcism" (Loose Assembly) – 1:58
8. "Simone's Crumbs" – 4:24
9. "Temporary States" – 0:23
10. "Ghost Writer" – 5:50
11. "Dreaming with Jill" – 5:10

== Personnel ==
- Mike Reed – drums
- Josh Abrams – bass
- Jason Adasiewicz - vibraphone
- Tomeka Reid – cello
- Greg Ward – alto sax
