= Proliferation (album) =

Studio album by Mike Reed
- Released: 2008
- Recorded: June 13 & 14, August 8, 2007
- Studio: Experimental Sound & Shape Shoppe, Chicago
- Genre: Jazz
- Length: 59:08
- Label: 482 Music
- Producer: Mike Reed

Mike Reed chronology
Last Year's Ghost (2007)	Proliferation (2008)	The Speed of Change (2008)

Proliferation is the debut album by People, Places & Things, a quartet led by American jazz drummer Mike Reed featuring saxophonists Greg Ward and Tim Haldeman, and bassist Jason Roebke. It was recorded in 2007 and released on 482 Music. Reed formed the band to explore the Chicago hard-bop scene from 1954-1960.

== Music ==
"Is-It", attributed to the entire Chicago hard-bop band MJT + 3, was most likely a Frank Strozier composition. "Wilbur's Tune Number 2" was composed by drummer Willbur Campbell and featured on the Ira Sullivan record Nicky's Tune. "Be-Ware", written by alto saxophonist John Jenkins, was a dedication to bassist Wilbur Ware included on The Chicago Sound, the sole album led by Ware. "Status Quo" was penned by the under-recorded tenor saxophonist John Neely and featured on the Clifford Jordan/John Gilmore album Blowing in from Chicago. The band perform two Sun Ra tunes, "Planet Earth" and "Saturn", which many consider The Arkestra's theme song. "Sleepy" is a piece by singer, poet and activist Oscar Brown Jr. "FA" is a tune by tenor saxophonist Tommy "Madman" Jones. "Pondering", another John Jenkins composition, was featured on the album Alto Madness, co-led with Jackie McLean.

== Reception ==
Professional ratings
Review scores
Source	Rating
Down Beat	4/5 stars

The Down Beat review by Bill Meyer states "By applying their outside talents with discipline and verve, the quartet’s members give some old seeds plenty of rich nourishment."

In a review for All About Jazz, Troy Collins says "With each tune dedicated to the people, places and things that have inspired him, Proliferation is Reed's love letter to his home town—a rich and invigorating ode to the grand tradition of post-war Chicago jazz."

== Track listing ==
All compositions by Mike Reed except as indicated

1. "Is-It" (MJT+3) – 4:02
2. "Wilbur's Tune" (Wilbur Campbell) – 5:02
3. "Be-Ware" (John Jenkins) – 6:47
4. "People" – 1:38
5. "Status Quo" (John Neely) – 5:25
6. "Planet Earth" (Sun Ra) – 7:24
7. "Sleepy" (Bobby Bryant/Oscar Brown Jr.) – 5:37
8. "Places" – 5:51
9. "FA" (Tommy "Madman" Jones) – 5:14
10. "Pondering" (John Jenkins) – 4:29
11. "Saturn" (Sun Ra) – 3:18
12. "Things" – 4:21

== Personnel ==
- Greg Ward – alto sax, clarinet, percussion, piano
- Tim Haldeman – tenor sax, percussion, piano
- Jason Roebke – bass, percussion, piano
- Mike Reed – drums, piano
