= Spacer (album) =

Studio album by Jason Adasiewicz
- Released: 2011
- Recorded: May 1 & 2, 2011
- Studio: Strobe Recording, Chicago
- Genre: Jazz
- Length: 42:06
- Label: Delmark
- Producer: Robert G. Koester

Jason Adasiewicz chronology
Sun Rooms (2010)	Spacer (2011)	New Myth/Old Science (2012)

Spacer is an album by American jazz vibraphonist Jason Adasiewicz, which was recorded in 2011 and released on Delmark. It was the second album by his trio Sun Rooms, featuring bassist Nate McBride and drummer Mike Reed.

== Reception ==
Professional ratings
Review scores
Source	Rating
Down Beat	4/5 stars
Tom Hull – on the Web	B+

The Down Beat review by Bill Meyer says about Adasiewicz's role in the trio "His playing with Sun Rooms proposes a broader role; the vibes generate melody and harmony the way a piano might in another trio, but they’re also like a drum kit, the source of the ensemble’s energy."

In a review for JazzTimes Mike Shanley notes "A casual listen to Spacer could give the impression that all the tracks have a similar approach and that one blends into the next. But this music shouldn’t be listened to casually."

The Tiny Mix Tapes review by Clifford Allen says "While there may be a number of opportunities to hear Adasiewicz in top form, Sun Rooms is a particularly fascinating trio that gives the vibraphonist ample room to stretch. It’s no wonder that he and his mates on Spacer are among Chicago’s first-call jazzmen."

== Track listing ==
All compositions by Jason Adasiewicz except as indicated

1. "Solo One" – 1:36
2. "Hi Touch" – 5:59
3. "Run Fly" – 4:51
4. "Pillow" – 3:48
5. "The Volunteer" (Nate McBride) – 4:44
6. "Bees" – 5:30
7. "Bobbie" (Eric Boeren) – 4:21
8. "Diesel" – 4:49
9. "Waiting in the Attic" – 3:52
10. "Solo Two" – 2:36

== Personnel ==
- Jason Adasiewicz - vibraphone
- Nate McBride – bass
- Mike Reed – drums
