= Montreal Parade =

Studio album by Dave Rempis
- Released: 2011
- Recorded: January 28 & 29, 2010
- Studio: Strobe Studios, Chicago
- Genre: Jazz
- Length: 62:35
- Label: 482 Music

Dave Rempis chronology
Bastard String (2010)	Montreal Parade (2011)	Instruments of Change (2012)

Montreal Parade is an album by American jazz saxophonist Dave Rempis, which was recorded in 2010 and released on 482 Music. It was the fifth recording by The Rempis Percussion Quartet, the first with Ingebrigt Håker Flaten replacing former bassist Anton Hatwich.

== Reception ==
Professional ratings
Review scores
Source	Rating
Down Beat	4/5 stars

The Down Beat review by Bill Meyer notes "Håker Flaten often favors probing melodies over walking lines, and the absence of a clearly defined central pulse opens up the music in thrilling ways."

The All About Jazz review by Troy Collins states "Straddling the line between unfettered freedom and the traditional conventions of implied structure, The Rempis Percussion Quartet covers a wide range on Montreal Parade, demonstrating the continuing validity of their freewheeling approach with compelling fervor."

In her review for JazzTimes, Lyn Horton says "This music demonstrates how to balance rhythm, tunefulness and sound-making in the art of improvisation."

== Track listing ==
All compositions by Rempis/Håker Flaten/Daisy/Rosaly

1. "This Is Not a Tango" – 20:07
2. "If You Were a Waffle and I Were a Bee" – 42:28

== Personnel ==
- Dave Rempis - alto sax, tenor sax, baritone sax
- Ingebrigt Håker Flaten - bass
- Tim Daisy - drums
- Frank Rosaly - drums
