= Whatthefuckdoyouwant =

Live album by Peter Brötzmann and Sonny Sharrock
- Released: 2014
- Recorded: March 9, 1987
- Venue: Alzette Kulturfabrik in Esch-sur-Alzette, Luxembourg
- Genre: Free jazz, punk jazz, noise
- Length: 1:12:19
- Label: Trost; TR 124

Peter Brötzmann chronology
Mental Shake (2014)	Whatthefuckdoyouwant (2014)	Soulfood Available (2014)

Whatthefuckdoyouwant is a live album by saxophonist Peter Brötzmann and guitarist Sonny Sharrock. It was recorded on March 9, 1987, at Alzette Kulturfabrik in Esch-sur-Alzette, Luxembourg, and was released in 2014 by Trost Records.

According to Brötzmann, the album title refers to an incident in Wuppertal, Germany, during which Sharrock, normally "a reliable, gentle man," became enraged at a manager, leading to a verbal altercation in which Sharrock shouted the words of the title. The manager then reportedly "turned around and started to run up the hill... and never was seen again."

== Reception ==
Professional ratings
Review scores
Source	Rating
All About Jazz	4.5/5 stars
The Free Jazz Collective	4/5 stars
Tom Hull – on the Web	B+

In a review for All About Jazz, Sammy Stein wrote: "Sharrock's guitar is a perfect antidote to Brotzmann's style—heavy, metallic and dextrous. The album is an almost perfect dialogue between two musicians. At times it sounds like a stage full of sax and guitar players but there are always only two. They listen to each other and intuitively pick up where one leaves off."

The Free Jazz Collective's Martin Schray called the album "a lesson in listening, a recording about communication, a real duo performance," and stated: "A surprising trademark of this album is the contrast between quiet, meditative, almost mellow passages which are confronted with brutal, distorted and wild parts... it's an emotional back and forth that structures the music but also affords the listener's permanent concentration."

Derek Taylor of Dusted Magazine commented: "the entire performance is recorded hot and gives the aural illusion of mics placed both in the innards of Sharrock's amplifier and the bells of Brötzmann's various horns. The effect... only adds to the visceral immediacy of duo's extended onslaught... By concert's end it's easy to envision the lucky audience in the aftermath with blown back domes and blissed-out grins, picking up their thoroughly-fried faculties from the floor."

Writing for Boston Hassle, Nick Neuburg described the album as "a very cohesive record of improvised music" and "a must grip for Brötzmann/Sharrock or Last Exit fans, free jazz fans, and all around heads alike." He remarked: "Even though one might expect this record to sound like Last Exit without the drummer and bassist, the music... creates no expectations for the functional or sonic roles that any kind of 'rhythm section' could and would possibly provide."

In an article for Louisville Music News, Martin Z. Kasdan Jr. wrote: "The album is strictly duet playing, but the high energy level of Brötzmann... and Sharrock is such that the lack of other instruments is not a drawback... the musicians reach sometimes cacophonous heights, swirling like banshees, seemingly invoking gods and demons... This is adventurous and challenging music, not for the faint of heart."

== Track listing ==
All music by Peter Brötzmann and Sonny Sharrock.

1. "01" – 3:29
2. "02" – 8:34
3. "03" – 8:12
4. "04" – 8:11
5. "05" – 5:47
6. "06" – 6:28
7. "07" – 4:41
8. "08" – 6:12
9. "09" – 9:44
10. "10" – 6:04
11. "11" – 4:40

== Personnel ==
- Peter Brötzmann – alto saxophone, tenor saxophone, bass saxophone, tárogató
- Sonny Sharrock – electric guitar
