= Sun Rooms =

Studio album by Jason Adasiewicz
- Released: 2010
- Recorded: November 2008
- Studios: Strobe Recording, Chicago
- Genre: Jazz
- Length: 45:38
- Label: Delmark
- Producer: Robert G. Koester

Jason Adasiewicz chronology
| Varmint (2009) | Sun Rooms (2010) | Spacer (2011) |

Sun Rooms is the first album by Sun Rooms, a trio led by the American jazz vibraphonist Jason Adasiewicz with the double bass player Nate McBride and drummer Mike Reed. It was recorded in 2008 and released by Delmark Records. The band played five Adasiewicz compositions and three cover versions: "Off My Back Jack" by Hasaan Ibn Ali, from his only album, The Max Roach Trio Featuring the Legendary Hasaan, "Overtones of China" by Sun Ra and "Warm Valley" by Duke Ellington.

== Reception ==
Professional ratings
Review scores
| Source | Rating |
|---|---|
| Down Beat | 3.5/5 stars |
| All About Jazz | 4.5/5 stars |
| All About Jazz | 4.5/5 stars |
| Tom Hull – on the Web | B+ |
| PopMatters | 7/10 stars |

The Down Beat review by Alain Drouot says, "Adasiewicz is a physical player equally at ease with material that requires a more gentle touch. His bell-like and resonant sound does not warrant any potent comparisons in the jazz world."

The All About Jazz review by Nic Jones says, "Sure, it's possible to name check both '60s-era Bobby Hutcherson and Walt Dickerson as points of reference, but they serve simply to highlight the fact that Adasiewicz is — for want of a better way of putting it — of a modern persuasion in both his composing and playing." AAJ's Mark Corroto commented: "The vibraphone, like the bass clarinet, can be pushed to extremes, yet never sounds bellicose or threatening. This trio can swing hard, yet the music remains a warming wash of tones and resonances."

In a review for JazzTimes, Lloyd Sachs wrote, "Bridging stark minimalism and animated freebop, the music on Sun Rooms is in a state of constant motion — and constant reinvention."

The Point of Departure review by John Litweiler says, "Adasiewicz almost always works in larger groups as a sideman. Maybe because of this trio's intimacy, this CD is the best, most revealing improvising I've heard from him."

Howard Reich of The Seattle Times included the album in his "Top 10 jazz albums of 2010" list, writing: "The translucency of the ensemble sound, the delicacy of the instrumental interplay and the sweet tintinnabulation of Adasiewicz's vibes-playing seduce the ear. Yet there's nothing sweet or lightweight about the music."

Writing for Exclaim!, Nilan Perera stated that the music is "performed with warmth and sensitivity," and commented: "The compositions themselves are quite beautiful, displaying an economy of line and exploring the distinct sounds of the vibes in a way that goes beyond the pianistic analogy."

In an article for PopMatters, John Garratt remarked: "add up the resumes for all three of these guys, and you get quite the modern jazz nexus brewing. Lyrical yet a little tame, Sun Rooms angles toward brighter things in the future."

== Track listing ==
All compositions by Jason Adasiewicz except as indicated

1. "Get In There" – 3:44
2. "Life" – 6:12
3. "Stake" – 4:43
4. "Rose Garden" – 6:28
5. "You Can't" – 5:55
6. "Off My Back Jack" (Hasaan Ibn Ali) – 7:45
7. "Overtones of China" (Sun Ra) – 4:59
8. "Warm Walley" (Duke Ellington) – 5:52

== Personnel ==
- Jason Adasiewicz - vibraphone
- Nate McBride – double bass
- Mike Reed – drums
