= Sarah Hennies =

American composer and percussionist

- Born: 1979 (age 46–47); Louisville, Kentucky
- Origin: Ithaca, New York
- Genres: Acoustic
- Instruments: Percussion
- Years active: 1993–present
- Labels: Astral Spirits; New World
- Website: https://www.sarah-hennies.com/

Sarah Hennies (born 1979) is an American composer and percussionist. She is known for her work as an acoustic group composer. She also contributes to improvisation, film, and performance art. She is currently a visiting assistant professor of music at Bard College.

== Life and career ==
Hennies was born in 1979, in Louisville, Kentucky. She began playing drums when she was nine years old, and as a teenager she started playing drums with local college punk rock bands. She attended the University of Illinois, Urbana-Champaign, where she studied under Stuart Saunders Smith, Herbert Brün, and William Moersch. She then received a master's degree from the University of California, San Diego, where she studied under Steven Schick. Later, she moved to Ithaca, New York.

After her graduation from UC San Diego, Hennies relocated to Austin, Texas, in 2003, and started collaborating with the guitarist Aaron Russell in the group Weird Weeds. In 2013, she founded her own record label, Weighter Recordings. Some of the musicians and ensembles with whom she has collaborated as a composer include Bearthoven, Bent Duo, Claire Chase, R. Andrew Lee, Talea Ensemble, Thin Edge New Music Collective, Two-Way Street, Nate Wooley, and Yarn/Wire. She is also a member of the music trio Meridian.

Hennies went through a gender transition in 2015 and much of her artwork reflects some aspects of her experience as a transgender woman. Her audio-visual work Contralto was premiered in 2017, featuring transfeminine identity issues and was nominated for the Queer|Art Prize in 2019.

== Awards ==
Hennies is the recipient of an Artist Fellowship from New York Foundation for the Arts (2016), the Grants to Artists Award (2019) from the Foundation for Contemporary Arts., and a 2024 United States Artists Fellowship. In 2022, she was one of 14 American composers to receive a commission from the Fromm Music Foundation at Harvard University.

== Works ==
=== Singles, extended plays and albums ===
Title	Details
Flourish	Released: 2013; Label: Consumer Waste; Format: CD
Clots	Released: 2014; Label: Weighter Recordings; Format: DVD
Work	Released: 2014; Label: Quakebasket; Format: CD
Everything Else	Released: 2016; Label: No Rent Records; Format: Cassette
Gather & Release	Released: 2016; Label: Category of manifestation; Format: CD
Reservoir 1: Preservation (with Philip Bush & Meridian)	Released: 2018; Label: Black Truffle; Formats: CD
The Reinvention of Romance	Released: 2020; Label: Astral Spirits Records; Format: 2 LPs
Extra Time	Released: 2020; Label: Hasana Editions; Formats: CD
Spectral Malsconcities (with Bearthoven & Bent Duo)	Released: 2020; Label: New World Records; Formats: CD
Bodies of Water	Released: 2024; Label: Sawyer Editions; Formats: CD
Motor Tapes	Released: 2024; Label: New World Records; Formats: CD

=== Films ===
- Contralto (2017) — a multimedia documentary exploring transfeminism
