= The Engines =

Studio album by The Engines
- Released: 2007
- Recorded: July 8 & 9, 2006
- Studio: Vivian's Palace, Chicago
- Genre: Jazz
- Length: 72:30
- Label: Okka Disk

Dave Rempis chronology
Hunter-Gatherers (2007)	The Engines (2007)	The Disappointment of Parsley (2009)

The Engines is the eponymous debut album by the collaborative free jazz quartet consisting of saxophonist Dave Rempis, trombonist Jeb Bishop, bassist Nate McBride and drummer Tim Daisy. It was recorded in 2006 and released on Okka Disk.

== Reception ==
Professional ratings
Review scores
Source	Rating
All About Jazz	4/5 stars
Tom Hull – on the Web	B+

The All About Jazz review by Andrey Henkin states "Is there is a Chicago aesthetic? .. If there is something in common, it is an ability to maintain momentum through a liberal mixture of long and short tones, the blues and squeaky European avant-gardisms, through-composition and lots of tightly executed starts and stops, zigs and zags."

In another review for All About Jazz, Mark Corroto says "Influences from rock to free jazz and small big bands make up this four-way collaboration of very talented musicians. Well worth your listen and admiration."

A writer for The Post and Courier noted the group's "blustery, blistering unison horn lines and steadfast-yet-inventive percussion," and commented: "when The Engines cut loose and let fly with reckless abandon... the quartet shines, settling into ruthless, sometimes Zeppelin-esque grooves... Sure, these engines can go from zero to 60 in a heartbeat and stop on a dime, but its when set on cruise control — guiding the listener with subtlety and finesse rather than steamroller force — that the ride is most enjoyable."

== Track listing ==
1. "Riser" (McBride) – 8:29
2. "Jet Lag" (Bishop) – 9:19
3. "Careful" (Daisy) – 6:42
4. "Mish Mumkin" (Rempis) – 9:56
5. "Rewind" (Bishop) – 9:08
6. "Backend Cover" (Rempis) – 12:20
7. "Four Broken Plates" (Daisy) – 8:37
8. "Mash Tun" (McBride) – 8:59

== Personnel ==
- Jeb Bishop - trombone
- Dave Rempis - alto sax, tenor sax, baritone sax
- Nate McBride - bass, electric bass
- Tim Daisy - drums
