= Funky-Do! =

Studio album by The Crown Royals
- Released: 1999
- Recorded: May 4 & 5, 1998
- Studio: Airwave, Chicago
- Genre: R&B, Funk
- Length: 39:19
- Label: Estrus

Ken Vandermark chronology
Deep Telling (1998)	Funky-Do! (1999)	Straight Lines (1999)

Funky-Do! is the second album by The Crown Royals, an instrumental R&B/funk quartet which includes jazz saxophonist Ken Vandermark. It was recorded in 1998 and released on Estrus.

== Reception ==
The CMJ New Music Report review by Tad Hendrickson states "Like Booker T. & the M.G.'s, these cats pump out endless grooves, paying unflagging attention to the nuances and rhythmic intricacies of the genre."

== Track listing ==
All compositions by The Crown Royals except as indicated

1. "Big Bag" – 5:08
2. "Old Skin" – 2:59
3. "Sassin' Back" – 4:08
4. "Ding Dong" (H. Alexander) – 3:06
5. "Liquid Wrench" – 5:22
6. "Rip 'N' Run" – 3:06
7. "Thug" – 5:00
8. "The Cyclone" – 2:15
9. "S.J. Especial" – 4:24
10. "My Baby Likes To Boogaloo" (D. Gardner) – 3:51

== Personnel ==
- Jeff BBQ – drums
- Mark Blade – bass
- Pete Nathan – guitar
- Ken Vandermark – tenor sax
