= Aphelion (Dave Rempis album) =

Live album by Dave Rempis
- Released: 2014
- Recorded: April 25, May 24 & September 5, 2013
- Venue: Elastic & Constellation, Chicago
- Genre: Jazz
- Length: 51:30
- Label: Aerophonic
- Producer: Dave Rempis

Dave Rempis chronology
| Second Spring (2014) | Aphelion (2014) | Spectral (2014) |

Aphelion is the debut release by the regular working trio of saxophonist Dave Rempis, bassist Joshua Abrams and percussionist Avreeayl Ra, which was recorded live at Chicago's Elastic and Constellation venues during 2013 and released on Rempis' Aerophonic label.

== Reception ==
Professional ratings
Review scores
| Source | Rating |
|---|---|
| Down Beat | 4/5 stars |

The Down Beat review by Aaron Cohen says "The group’s collective sensibility sounds unshakable throughout the disc."

The All About Jazz review by Mark Corroto notes "The potential for this new trio is infinite. Hopefully, there will be more where this came from."

In a review for PopMatters, John Garratt states "One moment it’s Eno fog, the next it’s blistering, stratospheric bop. Aphelion doesn’t inspire admiration, it inspires wonder."

In an article for Burning Ambulance, Phil Freeman says about the album "This is a fascinating, multifaceted record that’ll hit you with one unexpected moment after another, all of them enjoyable."

== Track listing ==
All compositions by Rempis/Abrams/Ra

1. "Ruah" – 3:58
2. "Noria" – 26:17
3. "Saqiya" – 21:15

== Personnel ==
- Dave Rempis - alto sax, baritone sax
- Joshua Abrams - bass, guimbri, small harp
- Avreeayl Ra - percussion
