= Rolldown (album) =

Studio album by Jason Adasiewicz
- Released: 2008
- Recorded: July 2005; Electrical Audio, Chicago
- Studio: Electrical Audio, Chicago
- Genre: Jazz
- Length: 53:47
- Label: 482 Music

Jason Adasiewicz chronology
Rolldown (2008)	Varmint (2009)

Rolldown is the debut album by the band led by American jazz vibraphonist Jason Adasiewicz featuring cornetist Josh Berman, saxophonist Aram Shelton, bassist Jason Roebke and drummer Frank Rosaly. It was recorded in 2005 and released on 482 Music.

== Reception ==
Professional ratings
Review scores
Source	Rating
AllMusic	4/5 stars
All About Jazz	4/5 stars
All About Jazz	4/5 stars
All About Jazz	4/5 stars

In his review for AllMusic, Michael G. Nastos states "Adasiewicz is a fine player, in the backdrop overall, and more pronounced as an emerging writer. He's scratching the surface, and offering great potential on this fine effort that comes recommended to those who choose to listen closely."

All About Jazz published several reviews: Mark Corroto says that the group sound makes "Rolldown a special band and album, and Adasiewicz a revelation as a new jazz composer." Troy Collins notes "Unconventional arrangements, expansive dynamics and unpredictable shifts in rhythm prevent these tunes from settling into simulacrums of the past." Mark F. Turner states "This is music that is heady and refined.. a select for progressive listeners."

== Track listing ==
All compositions by Jason Adasiewicz

1. "Good Looking Android" – 7:41
2. "Small Potatoes" – 5:30
3. "Valerie" – 5:40
4. "Creep" – 6:40
5. "Nearby" – 8:52
6. "Little Screw" – 10:43
7. "Gather" – 8:41

== Personnel ==
- Jason Adasiewicz - vibraphone
- Josh Berman – cornet
- Aram Shelton – alto sax, clarinet
- Jason Roebke – bass
- Frank Rosaly – drums
