= Umbrella Music =

Umbrella Music is a collective of jazz and improvisational musicians in Chicago, Illinois. Stating that their "goal is to pool resources in order to reach a larger audience for the music, and to provide better performance situations for artists," the group puts on three weekly concert series and an annual improvisational festival.

The 2009 Umbrella Music festival was called Chicago's second-most "impressive and adventurous jazz festival of the year" and featured European musicians together with Chicagoans such as John Herndon and Ken Vandermark.

In 2009 the website allaboutjazz.com wrote that "If jazz is to survive in a modern world without the support of major labels or corporate funding, it will be through the efforts of organizations like Umbrella Music."

Umbrella Music itself has been inactive since the end of 2014, after having held the weekly Wednesday "Immediate Sound Series" at the Hideout through September 14, 2014, and annual "Umbrella Music Festivals" through November 2013 at several Chicago locations, including Constellation and the Chicago Cultural Center. The Umbrella Music website is also inactive. As of 2017, some participants in Umbrella Music are still active in Chicago venues and organizations such as Elastic, Constellation, and Hungry Brain.
