= Cyrillic (album) =

Studio album by Dave Rempis
- Released: 2010
- Recorded: January 30, 2009
- Studio: Strobe Recording, Chicago
- Genre: Jazz
- Length: 57:52
- Label: 482 Music

Dave Rempis chronology
The Disappointment of Parsley (2009)	Cyrillic (2010)	Wire and Brass (2010)

Cyrillic is an album by American jazz saxophonist Dave Rempis with drummer Frank Rosaly, which was recorded in 2009 and released on 482 Music.

== Reception ==
The JazzTimes review by Lyn Horton states "Rempis and Rosaly have an inherently intense rhythmic sense. With a highly integrated sound despite the difference in timbre, the two musicians latch onto musical ideas and go forward as if there were no tomorrow."

The All About Jazz review by Troy Collins notes "Rempis and Rosaly's studied interplay lends even the most threadbare of skeletal themes a sense of foresight, making this fully improvised session one of the more concise and cohesive dates of its kind."

== Track listing ==
All compositions by Rempis/Rosaly

1. "Antiphony" – 8:15
2. "Tainos" – 7:54
3. "Thief of Sleep" – 4:16
4. "How to Cross When Bridges Are Out" – 15:57
5. "Still Will" – 8:27
6. "Don't Trade Here" – 4:16
7. "In Plain Sight" – 8:47

== Personnel ==
- Dave Rempis - alto sax, tenor sax, baritone sax
- Frank Rosaly - drums
