= The Hideout Inn =

Hideout Chicago
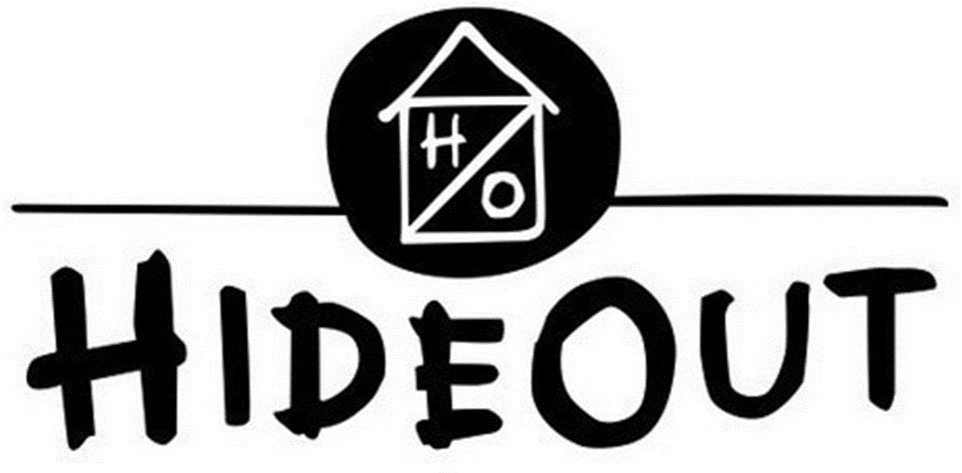

- Location within Chicago metropolitan area Location within Illinois Location within the United States
- Alternative names: Hideout Inn

General information
- Type: Balloon-frame house
- Location: 1354 W. Wabansia Ave, Chicago, Illinois, United States
- Coordinates: 41.9138°N 87.6625°W
- Groundbreaking: 1881
- Opened: 1933
- Renovated: October 1996
- Owner: Tim and Katie Tuten; Mike and Jim Hinchsliff

Design and construction
- Known for: Neighborhood bar Music venue Speakeasy

Other information
- Seating type: General admission
- Seating capacity: 100
- Parking: Street

Website
- HideoutChicago.com

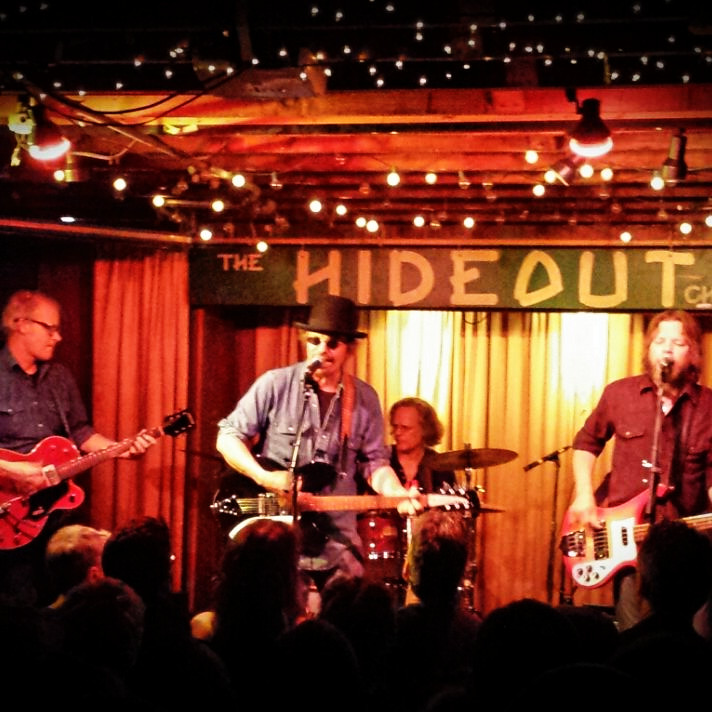
The Bottle Rockets performing at the Hideout in Chicago on November 21, 2015

Hideout Chicago, also known as Hideout Inn, is a music venue and former factory bar located in an industrial area between the Lincoln Park and Bucktown neighborhoods of Chicago in the Elston Avenue Industrial Corridor. It has been a key Chicago live music venue since it was purchased by friends Tim and Katie Tuten and Mike and Jim Hinchsliff in 1996. When not hosting live music or other events, for some years the Hideout continued to operate as a local neighborhood bar, but as of 2018 is only open in the evenings.

== History ==
The Hideout is a balloon-frame house built in 1881 as a boarding house for nearby factory workers. In 1916, the building became a public house, which began serving alcohol around 1919 as a prohibition-era neighborhood tavern and speakeasy. In 1934, after Prohibition ended, it became a legal bar with the name the "Hideout". Anecdotally, it came to be called the "Hideout" because of its remote location in an industrial, non-residential zone filled with factories and warehouses next to where the Chicago Department of Fleet Management stored snow plows until about 2016.

In 1947, Angelo "Sax" Favia took over the Hideout. His nephew Phil Favia and Phil's wife Eleanor “Chuckie” Favia helped Sax build the back room with their honeymoon money in 1954. The Favia family ran the Hideout as an unmarked bar until 1996, during which time it was frequented by locals employed in area warehouses and factories such as U.S. Steel and Procter & Gamble.

Phil Favia died in 1994; in 1996, Eleanor Favia sold the bar to Tim Tuten, a Chicago Public Schools teacher, his wife Katie Tuten, who worked for Catholic Charities, and identical twin brothers Mike Hinchsliff, a paper salesman, and Jim Hinchsliff, a financial analyst. Katie Tuten's father had been a regular at The Hideout when it was an unmarked bar whose location was not widely shared. Once she found the bar around 1986, she and Tim Tuten became regulars there. In 2019, the Chicago Tribune named the Tutens and Hinchsliffs "Chicagoans of the year in music". In 2020, Katie Tuten used her experience as co-chair of the Chicago Independent Venue League (CIVL) to help found the National Independent Venue Association (NIVA), which campaigns for public funding to help keep performance venues, such as the Hideout, solvent during the COVID-19 pandemic.

As of 2018, the Hideout has a patio-like front porch with picnic table seating, a front bar located in the original building, and a back performance area inside the 1954 addition.

=== North Branch Industrial Corridor ===
Hideout Chicago is located in Chicago's North Branch Industrial Corridor, an area that had been zoned and used for manufacturing and other industrial purposes. In July 2017, the city of Chicago passed an ordinance allowing much of the North Branch Industrial Corridor to be zoned for mixed-use development. There are concerns that the Hideout could be impacted by proposed "Lincoln Yards" development of the area but, as of July 2018, the Hideout plans to stay in business. As of 2025, the Hideout is still operating, but the Lincoln Yards development has been stalled for several years, with only one building, no tenants, and desperate finances.

== Programming and events ==
Hideout Chicago is best known for its music performances. Regular performers include house band Devil in a Woodpile and Robbie Fulks, who was an artist-in-residence from 2011 until 2017.

The Hideout Block Party was a weekend-long music festival held almost every year between 1996 and 2017. The Hideout Block Party started as a small party with a few hundred attendees and later drew upwards of 7000 attendees.

Hideout Chicago also hosts a number of non-music events. Regular community events include Soup & Bread, started by Martha Bayne, which has since spread to other cities; First Tuesdays, hosted by Chicago Reader reporter Ben Joravsky and ProPublica reporter Mick Dumke; and The Interview Show hosted by Mark Bazer.

== Awards and honors ==
In 2017, the Chicago Tribune compared spending time at the Hideout to being in a tavern that resembles the family living room, albeit with legendary music in the back lounge. Listing Hideout Chicago as one of the top 10 must-visit places in Chicago, The Guardian called it a beloved local bar that is both friendly and a musical institution. The Hideout has also been recognized nationally in several lists:

- 2006: Esquire, Best Bars in America
- 2011: Esquire, The Best Bars in America
- 2015: USA Today, Top 10 Best Small Music Venues in America
- 2016: Consequence of Sound, #20 in "The Greatest American Music Venues"
