= Out of Season (Dave Rempis album) =

Live album by Dave Rempis
- Released: 2004
- Recorded: October 6, 2003
- Venue: 3030, Chicago
- Genre: Jazz
- Length: 57:16
- Label: 482 Music

Dave Rempis chronology
Twenty Minute Cliff (2003)	Out of Season (2004)	American Mythology (2004)

Out of Season is an album by American jazz saxophonist Dave Rempis, which was recorded live in 2003 and released on 482 Music. It was the debut recording of his quartet with pianist Jim Baker, bassist Jason Roebke and drummer Tim Daisy.

== Reception ==
Professional ratings
Review scores
Source	Rating
The Penguin Guide to Jazz Recordings	3/4 stars

The JazzTimes review by Chris Kelsey states "The band isn't saying anything radically new, but they're not stealing licks from some dead guy, either, and that makes 'em okay in my book."

The All About Jazz review by Peter Aaron notes "A pristine, studio-quality set, the disc was recorded live at Chicago venue 3030 in October 2003. And it's one of the best recent examples of the powerful, incendiary sounds that mark the town as a prime center of forward-looking jazz."

== Track listing ==
All compositions by Rempis/Baker/Roebke/Daisy

1. "Out of Season Part I" – 16:44
2. "Out of Season Interlude" – 1:23
3. "Out of Season Part II" – 9:06
4. "Out of Season Part III" – 8:39
5. "Scuffle Part I" – 4:08
6. "Scuffle Part II" – 12:36
7. "Never at Loss" – 8:07

== Personnel ==
- Dave Rempis - alto sax, tenor sax
- Jim Baker - piano, analog synthesizer, violin
- Jason Roebke - bass
- Tim Daisy - drums
