= Aram Shelton =

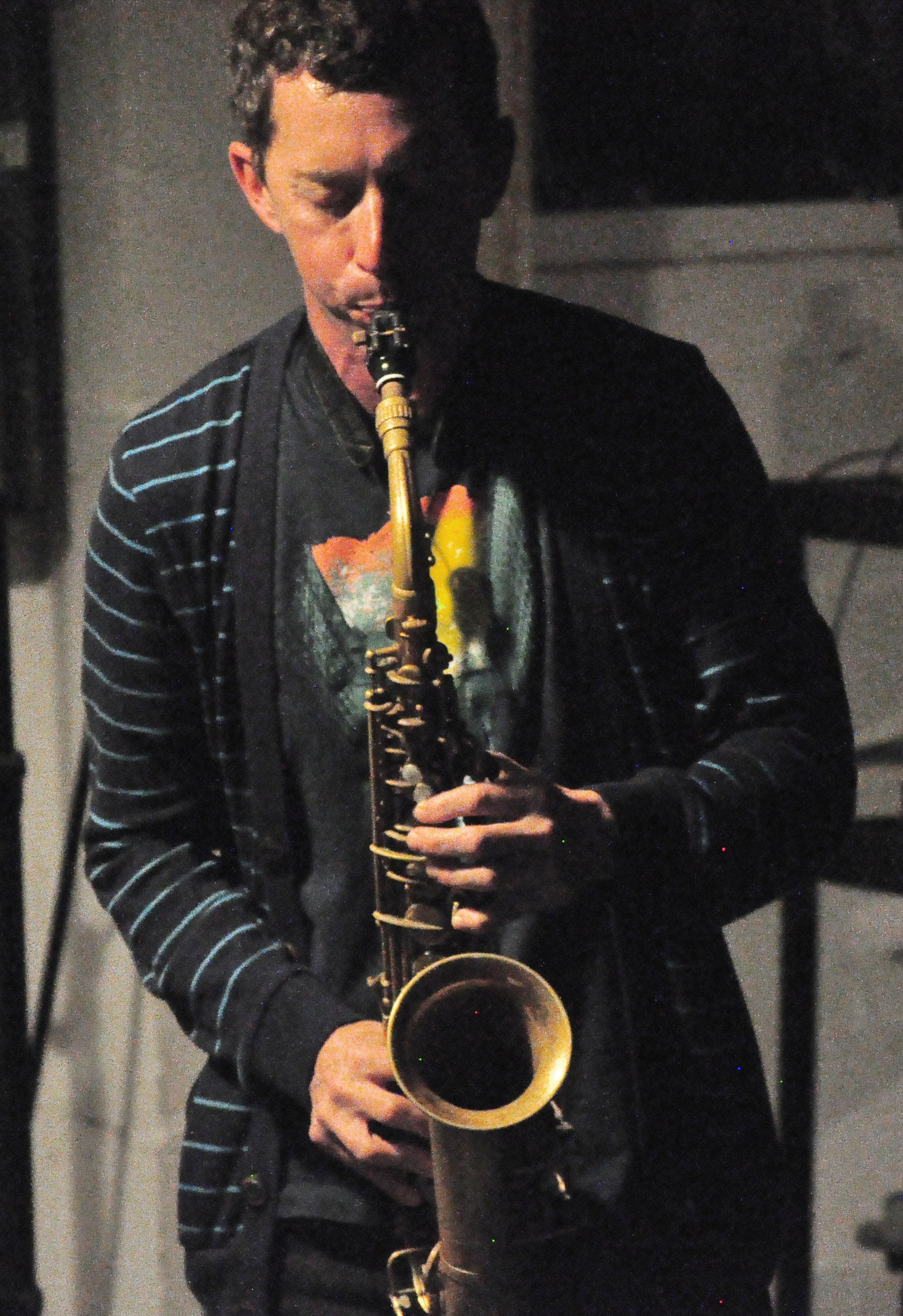
Shelton performing with the Ton Trio at the 20th Olympia Experimental Music Festival, 2014

Aram Shelton is an American composer, improviser and musician (primarily an alto saxophonist, but also playing other single-reed woodwinds), based in Oakland, California. His music has been compared to that of Eric Dolphy, Sun Ra, Archie Shepp, and Albert Ayler.

Originally from southeast Florida, Shelton first studied Western classical music, and received a degree in music from the University of Florida. By his own account he experienced "an epiphany" at a performance by Sam Rivers that moved him in the direction of contemporary jazz. After a brief stint in Washington, D.C., he moved to Chicago in 1999, where he gigged extensively in the local jazz and improvisational music scene. In 2005 he moved to the San Francisco Bay Area to study at Mills College. He continues to have connections to the Chicago scene while also launching several Bay Area-based bands and participating heavily in the area's improvisational music scene.

He currently performs regularly in the Bay Area with the groups the Sound Quartet, the Broken Trap Ensemble, and his solo electroacoustic project Tonal Masher, where he uses feedback harnessed by the saxophone along with a custom made Max patcher. Past projects include Dragons 1976, Arrive, Rapid Croche, and Grey Ghost during his Chicago years, and Ton Trio, Cylinder, Flockterkit, and Son of Gunnar Ton of Shel in the Bay Area. Since moving to California, he has continued to perform or record at times with groups based in Chicago including his eponymous Quartet, Arrive, Jason Adasiewicz's Rolldown and the Fast Citizens.

He has performed in many locations throughout North America and Europe with musicians including Larry Ochs, Mark Dresser, Tim Daisy, Ken Vandermark, Jason Ajemian, Josh Berman, Audrey Chen, Fred Lonberg-Holm, Dave Rempis, Damon Smith, Steve Bernstein, Weasel Walter, Jason Roebke, Liz Albee, Rob Mazurek, Matt Bauder, Jessica Pavone, Fred Frith, Josh Abrams, Harris Eisenstadt, Jeb Bishop, Tim Perkis, Kevin Drumm, Jon Raskin, Frank Rosaly, Guillermo Gregorio, and Chris Brown. His work has been released on recordings from labels including 482 Music, Locust Music, MultiKulti, Edgetone, Delmark, and his own Singlespeed Music.
