= Chicago Department of Fleet and Facility Management =

Agency overview
- Formed: 1991
- Preceding agency: Department of Fleet Management
- Jurisdiction: Government of Chicago
- Headquarters: 30 N. LaSalle Street, Suite 300 Chicago, Illinois 60602
- Employees: 1,063
- Annual budget: $330 million
- Agency executive: David Reynolds, Commissioner
- Website: www.cityofchicago.org

The City of Chicago Department of Fleet and Facility Management (DFM) was established by Mayor Richard M. Daley in 1991 as the Department of Fleet Management. It is codified at Section 2-38 of the Municipal Code of Chicago. According to the City of Chicago, "assets managed by the Department include more than 11,000 pieces of equipment and vehicles and more than 425 leased and owned facilities." Among the types of vehicles and equipment handled by the departments are police cars, pickup trucks, refuse trucks, fire ladders, and airport all-purpose runway brooms.

The City of Chicago lists the following as functions of the department: architecture, engineering, construction, and security; asset management; environmental management; facility operations; finance and administration; fleet operations; human resources; and systems and performance improvement.

The department's main office is at 30 North LaSalle. As of 2011, the department had 673 employees (with 12 trade unions representing some department employees) and 14 maintenance facilities and 11 fuel facilities located throughout the city. Many of the fueling stations include not only conventional gasoline but also ultra-low-sulfur diesel/biodiesel blend, E-85 ethanol fuel blend, compressed natural gas (CNG) and plug-in electric.

== History ==
Prior to 1991, fleet management functions were carried out by individual departments. The Department of Streets and Sanitation (S&S), Bureau of Equipment Services, was the largest of these fleet management subgroups prior to the establishment of DFM, and was managed by John O'Donnell. Consolidation efforts began in 1987, when Equipment Services functions were moved to the Department of General Services. The intent of this restructuring was to provide fleet management services to other departments. This operation was first headed by Thomas O'Connor, followed by Peter Carroll. In 1991, the need for a dedicated fleet management organization was realized with the creation of DFM.

Initially, DFM was given fleet management responsibility for Streets & Sanitation, Chicago Department of Transportation (CDOT), and several smaller departments, with a total fleet of approximately 3,500 units, and managed by Philip Corbett. In 1993, the Chicago Department of Aviation (CDA) fleet, deployed at the city's O'Hare and Midway Airports and numbering over 1,200 units, was brought under the DFM umbrella. Richard Santella served as Commissioner of Fleet Management from 1994 to 1998, followed by Robert Degnan.

The year 2000 brought the addition of the Chicago Fire Department fleet of 140 fire engines, 105 ambulances, and 87 aerial units under Fleet Management's supervision.

In 2004, the city's fleet centralization process was accelerated when the Chicago Department of Water Management and Chicago Police Department were added as DFM customer departments. All told, the department now manages a fleet in excess of 13,000 units, servicing nearly 50 entities. The department's annual budget is in excess of $100 million.

DFM also services City "sister agencies", which maintain separate operating budgets but have relinquished fleet management responsibility in order to reduce operating costs. These agencies include the Chicago Park District, Chicago Housing Authority and the Chicago Transit Authority's non-revenue fleet.

The driving force behind the centralizing fleet services is the philosophy of "core mission", the concept that the resources of each department should be focused on their area of expertise. Simply put, an auto mechanic is not assigned to put out fires, catch criminals, or tend to injured animals, so why should fire fighters, police officers or animal control experts focus on fixing trucks? With Chicago's fleet centralization process complete, all vehicle and equipment specifying, ordering, building, maintaining and fueling operations are now overseen by Fleet Management's 600+ employees.

Commissioner Michael J. Picardi was appointed by Mayor Daley to head the Department of Fleet Management in March 2002. For over three years prior to his appointment, he served as the Department's First Deputy Commissioner under Robert Degnan.

In May 2005, Commissioner Picardi was selected by Mayor Daley to head the city's largest civilian agency, the Department of Streets and Sanitation. During Picardi's 4-year tenure at Streets and Sanitation, Fleet Management was headed by Howard J. Henneman, who served as Commissioner until his retirement from City employment in June 2009. At that time, Michael Picardi returned to head the Department of Fleet Management for a second time.

In January 2010, Mayor Daley suspended Commissioner Picardi for 3 months following a report that a vendor with a criminal history was being used for body repair work on police cars. Following Picardi's return from serving his suspension, he was transferred to the Chicago Police Department. Al John Fattore then assumed the role of Acting Commissioner of Fleet Management until January 28, 2011, at which time Mayor Daley named Patrick Harney to run the department. Harney was confirmed as Fleet Management Commissioner by the Chicago City Council on February 9, 2011.

On April 22, 2011, Mayor-elect Rahm Emanuel announced that Fleet Management and General Services functions would once again be merged into a single department. David Reynolds was appointed as Commissioner of the combined departments in May 2011.

== Facilities and Infrastructure ==
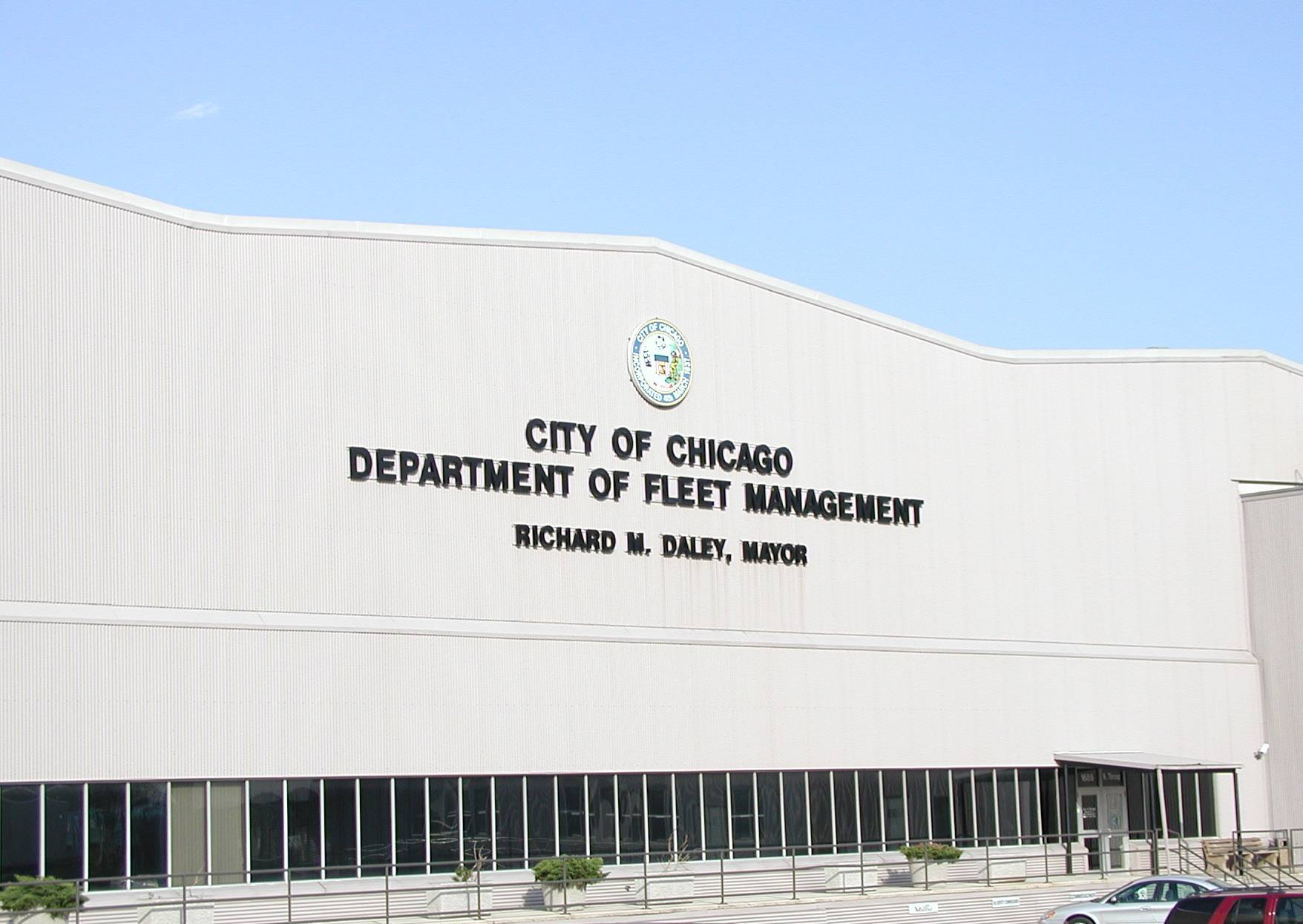
Fleet Management facility at 1685 N. Throop Street

A new, purpose-built maintenance facility was brought on line in the Fall of 2009. The Western Boulevard Maintenance Facility has been certified as one of only 4 "LEED Certified" municipal maintenance facilities in the State of Illinois.

The dozens of small gas pumps that were once scattered throughout Chicago's police stations, fire houses and maintenance facilities have been replaced by 11 consolidated fueling sites, which dispense diesel fuel (blended with biodiesel), unleaded gasoline, compressed natural gas (CNG), and ethanol. In addition to eliminating environmental issues associated with aging storage tanks, the sites incorporate streamlined fuel delivery and tracking. All fueling transactions are now captured real time, and stored in a database. The data is then analyzed to identify vehicle performance issues or fraudulent fueling activity.

The flagship station, located at 65th and State Streets, features solar panels for electricity, stations that supply alternative fuels, and a two-acre natural area that helps manage stormwater runoff.

== Technological Innovations ==
Upon delivery, all City-owned vehicles are entered into a Vehicle Maintenance and Reporting Tool (VMART) program, a customized version of the "M4" system developed by Maximus. Pertinent characteristics of each vehicle are captured by the system. This information is available to the office staff, maintenance personnel, and anyone who may need to review it.

Data mining software developed by Business Objects is utilized to run detailed reports regarding any aspect of the fleet's vehicle information, fueling logs and maintenance history. Using this software, all information entered into the database can be accessed in myriad combinations. Maintenance operations can also be analyzed to show which trucks are experiencing the most downtime, or which mechanics and shops are the most productive.

In addition to the many other services provided to City departments, DFM staffs a 24/7 Fleet Service Center, utilizing an "E-Trakker" system to manage the repair of downed vehicles.
