= Jeb Bishop =

American jazz musician

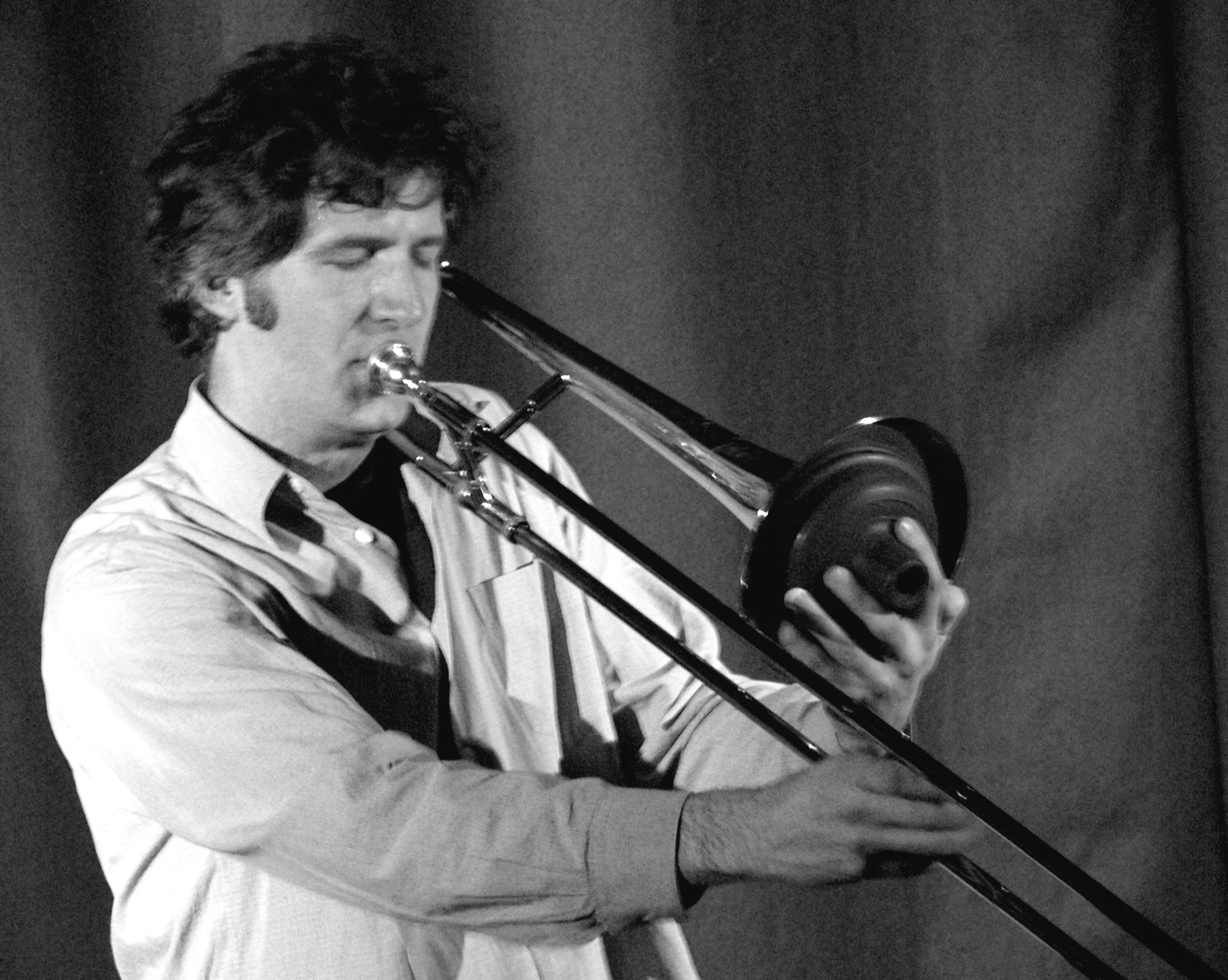
Jeb Bishop

Jeb Bishop (born 1962) is an American jazz trombone player.

== Biography ==
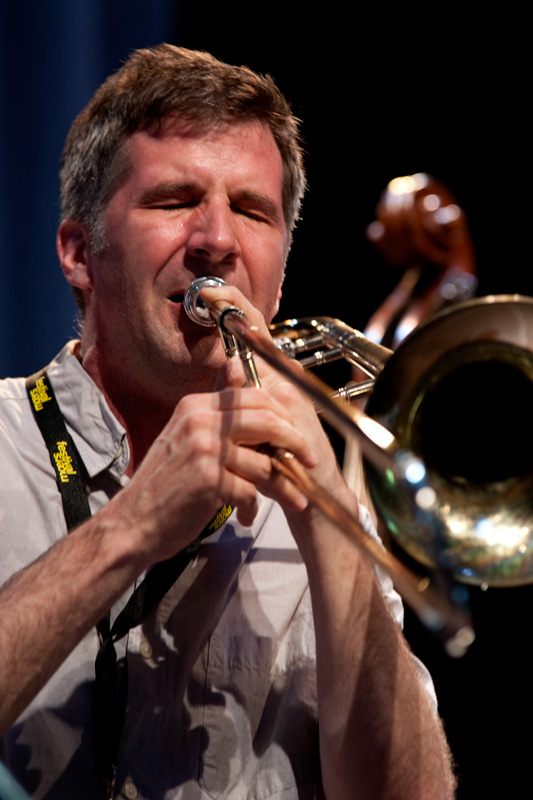
Bishop at mœrs festival 2010

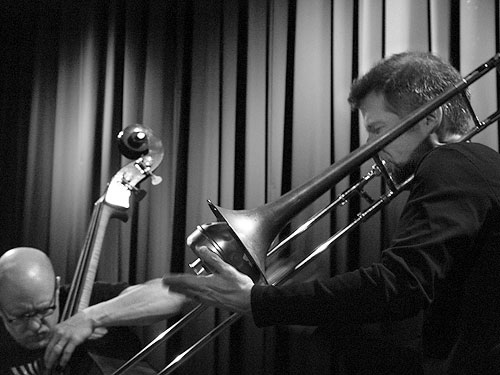
Bishop and Kent Kessler playing with Peter Brötzmanns Chicago Tentet in Aarhus, Denmark 2009

Bishop grew up in Raleigh, North Carolina, and attended Jesse O. Sanderson High School. He has studied music (classical trombone performance) at Northwestern University, engineering and philosophy at North Carolina State University, and philosophy at the University of North Carolina at Chapel Hill, the University of Arizona, Loyola University, and the Catholic University of Louvain, Belgium.

In the 1980s, he played electric bass and electric guitar in rock bands including Stillborn Christians, Egg, and/or, and the Angels of Epistemology (a band based in Raleigh and Chapel Hill that released a CD on Merge Records).

In the 1990s, he moved to Chicago and began transitioning from rock to jazz music. He played bass guitar in The Flying Luttenbachers (a jazz/rock band) and a jazz group led by Ken Vandermark called the Unheard Music Quartet. By the mid 1990s, he was performing in public on the trombone while also playing electric guitar (and trombone) in the Vandermark Five. He has also been a member of several of Vandermark's other groups including School Days.

By 2000 or so, he was focusing exclusively on trombone and formed his own trio, the Jeb Bishop Trio, with Vandermark Five cohorts bassist Kent Kessler and drummer Tim Mulvenna. The trio has two CDs on OkkaDisk, the second with guest guitarist Jeff Parker.

Bishop has also performed and recorded with a great many other local, national, and international musicians. He is a member of the Peter Brötzmann Chicago Tentet and has recorded duo albums with Joe McPhee and Sebi Tramontana. He has recorded and toured with English improvisers Tony Bevan and John Edwards. Regular Chicago collaborators include Fred Lonberg-Holm, Michael Zerang, Josh Abrams, and Hamid Drake.

In 2005, Bishop left the Vandermark Five and his live performances became infrequent. He cited problems with tinnitus; it was feared he had retired from music altogether. However, he became more musically active again the following year.

== Discography ==
As leader/co-leader

- Jeb Bishop: 98 Duets (Wobbly Rail, 1998)
- Jeb Bishop Trio: Jeb Bishop Trio (Okka Disk, 1999)
- Jeb Bishop Trio/Quartet: Afternoons (Okka Disk, 2001)
- Jeb Bishop & Sebi Tramontana: Chicago Defenders (Wobbly Rail, 2002)
- Lucky 7s: Farragut (Lakefront Digital, 2006)
- Lucky 7s: Pluto Junkyard (Clean Feed Records, 2009)
- Jeb Bishop Trio: 2009 (Better Animal Recordings, 2009)
- Jeb Bishop & Jorrit Dijkstra: 1000 Words (Driff Records, 2012)
- Jeb Bishop & Tim Daisy: Old Shoulders (Relay Recordings, 2012)

With Joe McPhee

- The Brass City (Okka Disk, 1997)

With Samo Salamon

- Dream Suites Vol. 1 (Samo Records, 2025)

With The Engines

- The Engines (Okka Disk, 2007)
- Other Violets (Not Two, 2013)
