= Paal Nilssen-Love discography =

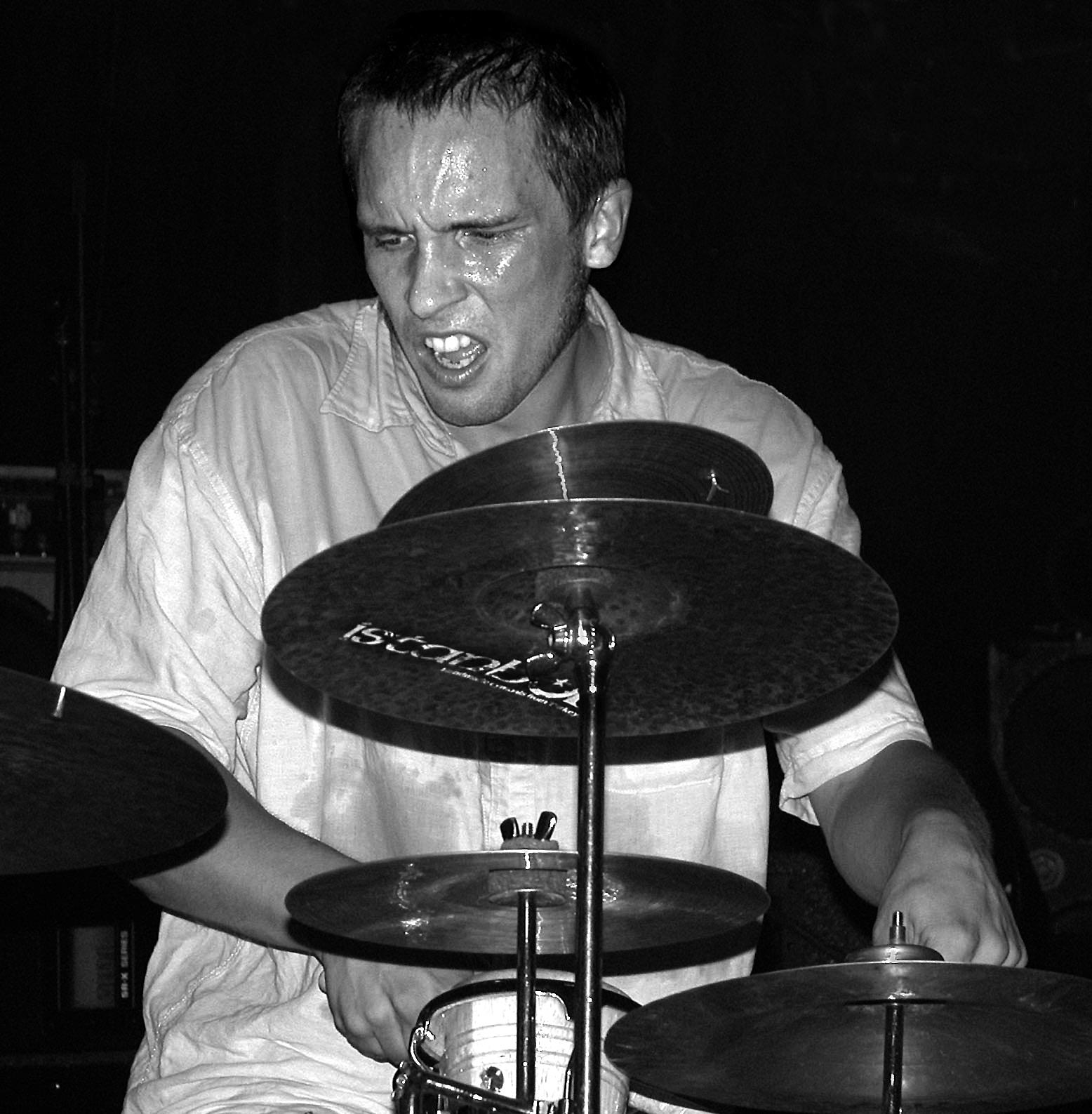
- Studio albums: 92
- Extended plays: 2
- Live albums: 16
- Compilation albums: 4

Paal Nilssen-Love (born December 24, 1974) is a Norwegian drummer active in the jazz and free jazz genres.

He has released two solo albums, and his portfolio includes Atomic, School Days, The Thing, Scorch Trio, Territory Band, FME, and various duo projects such as with reedmen Peter Brötzmann, Ken Vandermark, John Butcher, organist Nils Henrik Asheim and noise experimentalist Lasse Marhaug.

== Solo ==
Year	Title	Notes
2001	Sticks & Stones: Released: May 1, 2001; Label: Sofa (SOFA 505); Format: CD	Recorded in Sofienberg Church
2005	27 Years Later: Released: 2005; Label: Utech (024); Format: CD	Live at Moldejazz
2008	Miró: Released: 2010; Label: PNL (PNL007); Format: CD	Live at "Nits De Musica" July 24, 2008 in Barcelona
2012	Chiapaneca: Released: 2012; Label: Bocian (BC-PNL); Format: LP	Live in Mexico City
2015	News From The Junk Yard: Released: 2015; Label: PNL (PNL031); Format: LP	Studio album

== As band leader ==
=== Townhouse Orchestra ===
Year	Title	Notes
2005	Townorchestrahouse: Released: August, 2005; Label: Clean Feed Records (CF041 CD); Format: CD	Live
2008	Belle Ville: Released: 2008; Label: Clean Feed Records (CF125 CD); Format: 2CD	Live

=== Large Unit ===
Year	Title	Notes
2014	Erta Ale: Released: August, 2014; Label: PNL (PNL025); Format: LP/CD	Live
2015	2015: Released: 2015; Label: PNL (PNL030); Format: 2CD	Live
2016	Ana: Released: April 1, 2016; Label: PNL (PNL033); Format: CD	Studio album

== As co-leader or sideperson ==
=== ADA (Peter Brötzmann, Fred Lonberg-Holm, Paal Nilssen-Love) ===
Year	Title	Notes
2011	ADA: Released: 2011; Label: Self-released (ADA 001); Format: CD	Live
2012	OTO: Released: 2013; Label: Self-released (ADA 002); Format: CD	Live with Steve Noble
2011	OTO: Released: 2011; Label: Self-released (ADA 003); Format: CD	Live with Pat Thomas

=== Adam Lane, Ken Vandermark, Magnus Boo, Paal Nilssen-Love ===
Year	Title	Notes
2007	4 Corners: Released: 2007; Label: Clean Feed Records (CF076CD); Format: CD	Live

=== Anker ===
Year	Title
2005	Six Row Barley: Released: 2005; Label: Utech Records (013); Format: CD

=== Arto Lindsay, Paal Nilssen-Love ===
Year	Title	Notes
2013	Scarcity: Released: 2013; Label: PNL (PNL020); Format: CD	Live in Concert at Audio Rebel's Quintavant, Rio de Janeiro, Brazil July 2, 2013.

=== Atomic ===
Year	Title	comment
2001	Feet Music: Released: 2001; Label: Jazzland Rec/Universal (016 558-2); Format: CD	
2004	Boom Boom: Released: 2004; Label: Jazzland Rec/Universal (038 264-2); Format: CD	
2005	The Bikini Tapes: Released: 2005; Label: Jazzland Rec/Next Stop Distribusjon (987 154-0); Format: 3CD	Live
2006	Happy New Ears: Released: 2006; Label: Jazzland Rec/Universal (987 655-4); Format: CD	
2008	Retrograde: Released: 2008; Label: Jazzland Rec/Universal (176 884-3); Format: 3CD	2CD + Live CD
2010	Theater Tilters Vol. 1: Released: 2010; Label: Jazzland Rec/Universal; Format: CD	Live
2010	Theater Tilters Vol. 2: Released: 2010; Label: Jazzland Rec/Universal (273 341-0); Format: CD	Live
2011	Here Comes Everybody: Released: 2011; Label: Jazzland Rec (278 727-9); Format: CD	
2012	There's a Hole in the Mountain: Released: 2013; Label: Jazzland Rec (373 698-8); Format: CD	
2015	Lucidity: Released: 2015; Label: Jazzland Rec (471 991-8); Format: CD	

=== Atomic/School Days ===
Year	Title
2004	Nuclear Assembly Hall: Released: 2004; Label: Okka Disk (OD12049); Format: 2CD
2008	Distil: Released: 2008; Label: Okka Disk (OD12073); Format: CD

=== Bjørnar Andresen, Svein Finnerud, Paal Nilssen-Love ===
Year	Title
2000	Egne Hoder: Released: 2000; Label: Bp Records (bp 00008cd); Format: CD

=== Boneshaker (Mars Williams, Paal Nilssen-Love, Kent Kessler) ===
Year	Title
2012	Boneshaker: Released: 2012; Label: Trost Records
2014	Unusual Words: Released: 2014; Label: Soul What
2017	Thinking Out Loud: Released: 2017; Label: Trost Records; Format: CD
2019	Fake Music: Released: 2019; Label: Soul What

=== Bradford, Gjerstad, Håker Flaten, Nilssen-Love ===
Year	Title	Notes
2008	Reknes: Released: 2009; Label: Circulasione Totale (CTCD11); Format: CD	Live at Moldejazz
2012	Kampen: Released: 2012; Label: NoBusiness Records (NBLP51); Format: LP	Live at Kampenjazz; Limited edition of 300 records

=== Bradford, Gjerstad, Nilssen-Love ===
Year	Title	Notes
2010	Dragon: Released: 2012; Label: PNL (PNL014); Format: CD	Live at Klub Dragon

=== Brötzmann, Michiyo Yagi, Nilssen-Love ===
Year	Title
2008	Head On: Released: 2008; Label: Idiolect (ID-02); Format: CD

=== Brötzmann, Swell, Nilssen-Love ===
Year	Title
2015	Krakow Nights: Released: October 2015; Label: Not Two Records (MW937-2); Format: CD

=== Bugge Wesseltoft's New Conceptions Of Jazz ===
Year	Title
1998	Sharing: Released: 1998; Label: Jazzland Rec/Universal (538 259-2); Format: CD

=== Calling Signals ===
Year	Title
2006	Dreams in Dreams: Released: 2006; Label: FMR (CD177-0805); Format: CD

=== Christer Bothen Acoustic Ensemble ===
Year	Title
2002	7 Pieces: Released: 2002; Label: LJ Records (LJCD 5230); Format: CD

=== Circulasione Totale Orchestra ===
Year	Title
1992	Enten Eller: Released: 1992; Label: Circulasione Totale (CT CD 199208); Format: CD
1998	Borealis: Released: 1998; Label: (RCD1091); Format: CD
2008	Open Port: Released: 2008; Label: Circulasione Totale; Format: CD
2009	Bandwidth: Released: November 2, 2009; Label: Rune Grammofon (RCD 2089); Format: 3CD

=== Crimetime Orchestra ===
Year	Title
2005	Life is a beautiful monster: Released: April 13, 2005; Label: Jazzaway Records (jarcd009); Format: CD

=== Didrik Ingvaldsen ===
Year	Title
2000	History & Movement: Released: 2000; Label: Da-Da (4CD); Format: CD

=== Double Tandem (Ab Baars, Ken Vandermark, Paal Nilssen-Love) ===
Year	Title
2011	Cement: Released: 2012; Label: PNL (PNL013); Format: CD
2012	OX: Released: October 15, 2012; Label: dEN Records (010); Format: CD

=== Element ===
Year	Title
1996	Element: Released: 1996; Label: Turn Left Prod (001); Format: CD
1999	Shaman: Released: 1999; Label: Bp Records (bp 99001cd); Format: CD

=== Fireroom ===
Year	Title
2008	Broken Music: Released: April 8, 2008; Label: Atavistic (61183); Format: CD

=== FME (Free Music Ensemble) ===
Year	Title	Comment
2002	Live at Glenn Miller café: Released: 2002; Label: Okka Disk (ODL 10007); Format: CD	Live
2004	Underground: Released: 2004; Label: Okka Disk (OD 12051); Format: CD	
2005	Cuts: Released: 2005; Label: Okka Disk (OD 12061); Format: CD	
2006	Montage: Released: 2006; Label: Okka Disk (OD 12071); Format: CD	

=== Fred Lonberg-Holm, Paal Nilssen-Love ===
Year	Title	Comment
2012	You Can Be Mine: Released: April 2015; Label: Bocian Records (bc fp); Format: LP, Limited Edition	Recorded 31 August 2012 at Rattlesnake Studio, Chicago.

=== Frode Gjerstad, Fred Lonberg-Holm, Amit Sen, Paal Nilssen-Love ===
Year	Title	Comment
2007	The Cello Quartet: Released: 2007; Label: FMR Records (FMRCD 212-0906); Format: CD	Live

=== Frode Gjerstad and Paal Nilssen-Love ===
Year	Title
2007	Day Before One: Released: 2007; Label: Tyyfus (4); Format: LP
2008	Gromka: Released: 2010; Label: Not Two Records (MW 839-2); Format: CD
2008	Side By Side: Released: March 2012; Label: CIMP (CIMP 388); Format: CD

=== Frode Gjerstad Trio ===
Year	Title	Comment
2001	The Blessing Light: For John Stevens: Released: 2001; Label: Cadence Jazz (CJR 1126); Format: CD	
2002	Last First: Released: 2002; Label: Falcata-Galia (FALC-0007/0079); Format: CD	
2003	Sharp Knives cut Deeper: Released: 2003; Label: Splasc(h) (CDH850.2); Format: CD	Frode Gjerstad trio + Peter Brötzmann
2004	St. Louis: Released: January 12, 2004; Label: FMR (122); Format: CD	
2006	Mothers And Fathers: Released: 2006; Label: Circulasione Totale (CTCD 8); Format: CD	
2007	Nothing is Forever: Released: 2007; Label: Circulasione Totale (CTCD 10); Format: CD	

=== Ingoma ===
Year	Title
2000	Ingoma: Released: 2000; Label: Sheer Sound (SSCD 053); Format: CD

=== Joe McPhee / Paal Nilssen-Love ===
Year	Title
2008	Tomorrow Came Today: Released: 2008; Label: Smalltown Superjazzz (STSJ 148CD); Format: CD

=== John Butcher / Paal Nilssen-Love ===
Year	Title
2006	Concentric: Released: 2006; Label: Clean Feed (CF 067CD); Format: CD

=== Jon Eberson, Bjørnar Andresen, Paal Nilssen-Love ===
Year	Title
2001	Mind the gap: Released: 2001; Label: Curling Legs (CD 66); Format: CD

=== Ken Vandermark / Paal Nilssen-Love ===
Year	Title
2003	Dual Pleasure: Released: May 20, 2003; Label: Smalltown Supersound (STS 068); Format: CD
2004	Dual Pleasure 2: Released: October 11, 2004; Label: Smalltown Supersound (STS 085); Format: 2CD
2006	Seven: Released: 2006; Label: Smalltown Superjazzz (STSJ 119CD); Format: CD
2006	Chicago Volume: Released: 2009; Label: Smalltown Superjazzz (STSJ 179CD); Format: CD

=== Kornstad trio ===
Year	Title	Comment
2001	Space Available: Released: 2001; Label: Jazzland Acoustic (016 558-2); Format: CD	
2004	Live from Kongsberg: Released: 2004; Label: Jazzland Acoustic (060 249 812 803-9); Format: 2x 12"	Kornstad trio + Axel Dörner; Live

=== Lars Göran Ullander trio ===
Year	Title	Notes
2005	Live at Glenn Miller Café: Released: 2005; Label: Ayler Records (aylCD-013); Format: CD	Live

=== Lasse Marhaug / Paal Nilssen-Love ===
Year	Title	Notes
2005	Personal Hygiene: Released: 2005; Label: Utech Records (UR-005); Format: CD	Live
2007	Stalk: Released: May, 2007; Label: PNL (PNL001); Format: CD	
2011	No Combo: Released: June 20, 2011; Label: Pica Disk (PICA028), PNL (PNL009); Format: LP, Single Sided, Limited Edition	Live

=== Magnus Broo / Paal Nilssen-Love ===
Year	Title
2008	Game: Released: 2008; Label: PNL (PNL003); Format: CD

=== Marilyn Crispell ===
Year	Title
2004/2007	Collaborations: Released: 2009; Label: Leo Records (LR 528); Format: CD

=== Masahiko Satoh, Paal Nilssen-Love ===
Year	Title
2014	Spring Snow: Released: May, 2014; Label: PNL Records (PNL 023); Format: CD

=== Mats Gustafsson, Paal Nilssen-Love, Mesele Asmamaw ===
Year	Title
2010	Baro 101: Released: 2012; Label: Terp Records (AIS-19); Format: CD

=== Michiyo Yagi, Ingebrigt Håker Flaten, Paal Nilssen-Love ===
Year	Title	comment
2006	Live! at the SuperDeluxe: Released: August, 2006; Label: Idiolect/Bomba Records (BOM26002); Format: CD	Live

=== Michiyo Yagi, Joe McPhee, Lasse Marhaug, Paal Nilssen-Love ===
Year	Title	comment
2013	Soul Stream: Released: December, 2015; Label: PNL (PNL032); Format: CD	Recorded at GOK Sound, Tokyo on January 21, 2013.

=== Michiyo Yagi, Lasse Marhaug, Paal Nilssen-Love ===
Year	Title	comment
2011	Angular Mass: Released: December, 2015; Label: PNL (PNL028); Format: CD	Recorded at GOK Sound, Tokyo on February 8, 2011.

=== Nils Henrik Asheim / Paal Nilssen-Love ===
Year	Title
2005	Pipes & Bones: Released: March, 2005; Label: Utech Records (UR-006); Format: CD
2007	Late Play: Released: 2007; Label: PNL (PNL002); Format: CD

=== No spagetti edition ===
Year	Title
2001	Listen... And Tell Me What It Was: Released: July 7, 2001; Label: Sofa (SOFA506); Format: CD

=== OFFONOFF ===
Year	Title
2007	Clash: Released: 2008; Label: Smalltown Superjazzz (STSJ 147); Format: CD
Year	Title
2007	Slap and Tickle: Released: 2009; Label: Smalltown Superjazzz (STSJ 164); Format: CD

=== Original Silence ===
Year	Title
2007	The First Original Silence: Released: 2007; Label: Smalltown Superjazzz (STSJ 124CD); Format: CD
2008	The Second Original Silence: Released: July 28, 2008; Label: Smalltown Superjazzz (STSJ 144CD); Format: CD

=== Paal Nilssen-Love, Anders Hana ===
Year	Title
2005	AM/FM: Released: 2005; Label: Utech Records (UR-023); Format: CD

=== Paal Nilssen-Love, Håkon Kornstad ===
Year	Title
2004	Schlinger: Released: February 24, 2004; Label: Smalltown Supersound (STS 077); Format: CD

=== Paal Nilssen-Love, Massimo Pupillo, Lasse Marhaug ===
Year	Title
2011	You're Next: Released: October 1, 2012; Label: Bocian Records (BC-PML); Format: LP

=== Paal Nilssen-Love, Mats Gustafsson ===
Year	Title
2002	I Love It When You Snore: Released: December 10, 2002; Label: Smalltown Supersound (STS 063); Format: CD
2007	Splatter: Released: 2007; Label: Smalltown Superjazzz (STSJ 115CD); Format: CD

=== Paal Nilssen-Love, Michiyo Yagi, Peter Brötzmann ===
Year	Title
2008	Volda: Released: January, 2010; Label: Idiolect (ID-03); Format: CD

=== The Peter Brötzmann Chicago tentet ===
Year	Title	Comment
2005	Be Music, Night: Released: 2005; Label: Okka Disk (OD 12059); Format: CD	
2007	American Landscapes 1: Released: 2007; Label: Okka Disk (OD12067); Format: CD	Live
2007	American Landscapes 2: Released: 2007; Label: Okka Disk (OD12068); Format: CD	Live
2007	At Molde 2007: Released: 2007; Label: Okka Disk (OD12072); Format: CD	Live
2009	3 Nights in Oslo: Released: 2010; Label: Smalltown Superjazzz (STSJ197CD); Format: CD	Live

=== Peter Brötzmann / Paal Nilssen-Love ===
Year	Title
2008	Sweet Sweat: Released: 2008; Label: Smalltown Superjazzz (STSJ 143CD); Format: CD
2008	Woodcuts: Released: 2010; Label: Smalltown Superjazzz (STSJ 170CD); Format: CD

=== Peter Brötzmann, Paal Nilssen-Love and Mats Gustafsson ===
Year	Title
2007	The Fat Is Gone: Released: 2007; Label: Smalltown Superjazzz (STSJ 138CD); Format: CD

=== Peter Janson, Jonas Kullhammar, Paal Nilssen-Love ===
Year	Title
2002	Live at Glenn Miller café: Released: 2002; Label: Ayler Records (AylCD-012); Format: CD

=== Pocket Corner ===
Year	Title
1999	Cosmic Ballet: Released: 1999; Label: Bp Records (bp 99000lp); Format: 12"
1997	By-Music: Released: 1997; Label: Da-Da (3CD); Format: CD
1996	Rede for Hugg: Released: 1996; Label: Da-Da (2CD); Format: CD
1995	Slutt: Released: 1995; Label: Da-Da (1CD); Format: CD

=== (((Powerhouse Sound))) ===
Year	Title
2007	Oslo/Chicago: (((Breaks))): Released: March, 2007; Label: Atavistic (ALP1772CD); Format: 2CD

=== Quintet ===
Year	Title
1999	March 28, 1999: Released: 1999; Label: Bp Records (bp 99002cd); Format: CD

=== Rodrigo Amado, Kent Kessler, Paal Nilssen-Love ===
Year	Title
2006	Teatro: Released: 2006; Label: European Echoes (001); Format: CD
2008	The Abstract Truth: Released: 2009; Label: European Echoes (003); Format: CD

=== Samsa'Ra ===
Year	Title
2005	Samsa'Ra: Released: April 11, 2005; Label: Jazzland Rec. (038 265-2); Format: CD

=== San ===
Year	Title
1997	Song: Released: 1997; Label: Nor CD (NOR-CD 9720); Format: CD

=== School Days ===
Year	Title	comment
2000	Crossing Division: Released: 2000; Label: Okka Disk (OD12037); Format: CD	
2002	The music of Norman Howard: Released: 2002; Label: Anagram Records (ANA LP 001); Format: LP	Side A: The Thing with guests; Side B: School Days with Mats Gustafsson
2002	In Our Times: Released: 2002; Label: Okka Disk (OD12041); Format: CD	

=== Scorch Trio ===
Year	Title
2002	Scorch Trio: Released: February 18, 2002; Label: Rune Grammofon (RCD 2025); Format: CD, 2LP
2004	Luggumt: Released: October 11, 2004; Label: Rune Grammofon (RCD 2040); Format: CD, 2LP
2008	Brolt: Released: April 21, 2008; Label: Rune Grammofon (RCD 2074); Format: CD

=== Sten Sandell Trio ===
Year	Title	Comment
2001	Standing Wave: Released: 2001; Label: Sofa (SOFA 504); Format: CD	
2004	Flat Iron: Released: 2004; Label: Sofa (SOFA 514); Format: CD	
2007	Oval: Released: January, 2007; Label: Intakt Records (Intakt CD 122); Format: CD	
2007	Strokes: Released: June, 2007; Label: Clean Feed (CF082CD); Format: CD	Sten Sandell Trio + John Butcher

=== Steve Hubback / Paal Nilssen-Love ===
Year	Title
2004	Off the Map: Released: 2004; Label: FMR (FMRCD 138-1203); Format: CD

=== Terrie Ex & Paal Nilson-Love ===
2011	Hurgu!: Released: 2011; Label: PNL (PNL012); Format: CD	Terrie Ex & Paal Nilson-Love

=== Territory Band ===
Year	Title	Notes
2004	Map Theory: Released: 2004; Label: Okka Disk (OD12060); Format: 2CD	Territory Band-3
2005	Company Switch: Released: 2005; Label: Okka Disk (OD12070); Format: 2CD	Territory Band-4
2006	New Horse For The White House: Released: 2006; Label: Okka Disk (OD12080); Format: 3CD	Territory Band-5
2007	Collide: Released: 2007; Label: Okka Disk (OD12090); Format: CD	Territory Band-6 with Fred Anderson

=== The Thing ===
Year	Title	Notes
2000	The Thing: Released: 2000; Label: Crazy Wisdom (CW001); Format: CD	
2001	She Knows...: Released: 2001; Label: Crazy Wisdom (CW006); Format: CD	as The Thing with Joe McPhee
2004	Garage: Released: 2004; Label: Smalltown Superjazzz (STS078CD); Format: CD	
2005	Live at Blå: Released: June, 2005; Label: Smalltown Superjazzz (STSJ099CD); Format: CD	Live
2006	Action Jazz: Released: 2006; Label: Smalltown Superjazzz (STSJ123CD); Format: CD	
2007	Immediate Sound: Released: 2007; Label: Smalltown Superjazzz (STSJ105CD); Format: CD	as The Thing with Ken Vandermark
2008	Now And Forever: Released: 2008; Label: Smalltown Superjazzz (STSJ106CD); Format: 3CD+DVD	Box set containing The Thing, She Knows..., a new improv session Gluttony and a live DVD Live at Øya
2009	Bag It!: Released: June 15, 2009; Label: Smalltown Superjazzz (STSJ155CD); Format: CD	
2009	Shinjuku Crawl: Released: October, 2009; Label: Smalltown Superjazzz (STSJ169CD); Format: CD	as The Thing With Otomo Yoshihide
2013	Boot!: Released: November 12, 2013; Label: The Thing (TTRCD001); Format: CD	
2015	Shake: Released October 30, 2015; Label The Thing (TTRCD005); Format: CD	

See also The Music of Norman Howard, an album by School Days and The Thing.

=== Two Bands and a Legend ===
Year	Title	Notes
2005	Sounds Like A Sandwich: Released: March, 2005; Label: Smalltown Superjazzz (STSJ103CD); Format: CD	as The Thing with Cato Salsa Experience and Joe McPhee; EP
2007	Two Bands And A Legend: Released: March, 2007; Label: Smalltown Superjazzz (STSJ104CD); Format: CD	as Two Bands and a Legend
2007	I See You Baby: Released: 2007; Label: Smalltown Superjazzz (STSJ130CD); Format: CD	as Two Bands and a Legend; EP

=== Trygve Seim ===
Year	Title
2000	Different Rivers: Released: 2000; Label: ECM (1744 159 521-2); Format: CD

=== Wunderkammer ===
Year	Title
2002	Today I Cannot Hear Music: Released: August 26, 2002; Label: HoneyMilk Records (HONEY06); Format: CD

=== Zim Ngqawana ===
Year	Title
1999	Zimology: Released: 1999; Label: Sheer Sound (SSCD 038); Format: CD

== Compilations ==
Year	Title	Ensemble
1995	Jazz I Timeglass Vol.1: Released: 1995; Label: Stavanger Konserthus (1995); Format: CD	
2002	Money Will Ruin Everything: Released: November 10, 2003; Label: Rune Grammofon (RCD 2032); Format: 2CD	Scorch Trio
2006	Until Human Voices Wake Us And We Drown: Released: April 24, 2006; Label: Rune Grammofon (RLP 2050); Format: 5x 10" vinyl	Scorch Trio
2007	Runeology 3: Released: July 1, 2007; Label: Rune Grammofon (RCDS3); Format: CD	Scorch Trio

== See also ==
- Ingebrigt Håker Flaten discography
- Rune Grammofon discography
- List of experimental big bands
