= Ingebrigt Håker Flaten discography =

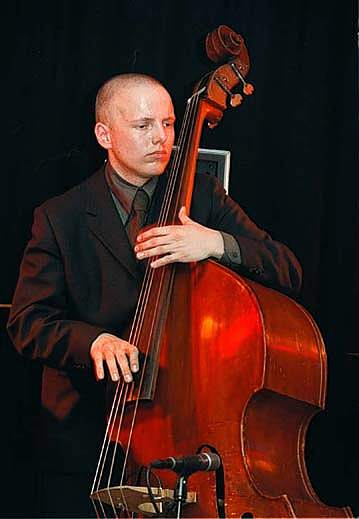
- Studio albums: 66
- Extended plays: 2
- Live albums: 11
- Compilation albums: 3

Ingebrigt Håker Flaten (born 1971 in Oppdal Municipality, Norway) is a Norwegian bass player active in the jazz and free jazz genres.

He has released one solo album, and two albums with his quintet, Ingebrigt Håker Flaten Quintet. Flaten is also active in a long list of other ensembles, such as Atomic, The Thing, Scorch Trio and Free Fall.

== Solo ==
Year	Title
2003	Double Bass: Released: July 1, 2003; Label: Sofa (SOFA511); Format: CD
2012	Birds - Solo Electric: Released: January 27, 2012; Label: Tektite Records Co.Operative (TR1201 CD); Format: CDr
2012	Steel - Live In Bucharest: Released: January 27, 2012; Label: Tektite Records Co.Operative (TR1202 CD); Format: CDr

== Ingebrigt Håker Flaten Quintet ==
Year	Title
2006	Quintet: Released: May, 2006; Label: Jazzland Rec/Universal (985 953-1); Format: CD
2008	The Year Of The Boar: Released: March 10, 2008; Label: Jazzland Rec/Universal (176 176-4); Format: CD

== Ingebrigt Håker Flaten, Håkon Kornstad, Jon Christensen ==
Year	Title
2011	Mitt Hjerte Altid Vanker – I: Live At Oslo Jazzfestival; Released: February 14, 2011; Label: Compunctio (COMPCD005); Format: CD
2011	Mitt Hjerte Altid Vanker – II: Live At Uppsala Sacred Music Festival; Released: September 9, 2011; Label: Compunctio (COMPCD006); Format: CD

== Other ensembles ==
=== Aaly Trio/DKV trio ===
Year	Title
2002	Double or Nothing: Released: 2002; Label: Okka Disk (OD12035); Format: CD

=== Atle Nymo / Ingebrigt Håker Flaten / Håkon Mjåset Johansen ===
Year	Title
2008	Play Complete Communion: Released: September 22, 2008; Label: Bolage (BLGCD005); Format: CD

=== Atomic ===
Year	Title	comment
2001	Feet Music: Released: 2001; Label: Jazzland Rec/Universal (016 558-2); Format: CD	
2004	Boom Boom: Released: 2004; Label: Jazzland Rec/Universal (038 264-2); Format: CD	
2005	The Bikini Tapes: Released: 2005; Label: Jazzland Rec/Next Stop Distribusjon (987 154-0); Format: 3CD	Live
2006	Happy New Ears: Released: 2006; Label: Jazzland Rec/Universal (987 655-4); Format: CD	
2008	Retrograde: Released: 2008; Label: Jazzland Rec/Universal (176 884-3); Format: 3CD	2CD + Live CD
2010	Theater Tilters Vol. 1: Released: 2010; Label: Jazzland Rec/Universal; Format: CD	Live
2010	Theater Tilters Vol. 2: Released: 2010; Label: Jazzland Rec/Universal (273 341-0); Format: CD	Live
2010	Here Comes Everybody: Released: 2011; Label: Jazzland Rec/Universal (278 727-9); Format: CD	
2013	There's a Hole in the Mountain: Released: 2013; Label: Jazzland Rec/Universal (373 698-8); Format: CD/LP (2014)	Live
2013	Lucidity: Released: 2015; Label: Jazzland Rec/Universal (471 991-8); Format: CD	

=== Atomic/School Days ===
Year	Title
2004	Nuclear Assembly Hall: Released: 2004; Label: Okka Disk (OD12049); Format: 2CD
2008	Distil: Released: 2008; Label: Okka Disk (OD12073); Format: CD

=== Bugge Wesseltoft's New Conceptions Of Jazz ===
Year	Title	comment
1997	New Conception of Jazz: Released: 1997; Label: Jazzland Rec/Universal (537 251-2); Format: CD	
1998	Sharing: Released: 1998; Label: Jazzland Rec/Universal (538 259-2); Format: CD	
2001	Moving: Released: 2001; Label: Jazzland Rec/Universal (013 534-2); Format: CD	
2003	New Conception of Jazz Live: Released: 2003; Label: Jazzland Rec/Universal (038 500-2); Format: CD	Live
2004	Film Ing: Released: 2004; Label: Jazzland Rec/Universal (986 612-3); Format: CD	

=== Circulasione Totale Orchestra ===
2008	Open Port: Released: 2008; Label: Circulasione Totale; Format: CD
2009	Bandwidth: Released: November 2, 2009; Label: Rune Grammofon (RCD 2089); Format: 3CD

=== Close Erase ===
Year	Title
1996	Close Erase: Released: 1996; Label: Nor CD (NOR-CD 9619); Format: CD
1999	No 2: Released: 1999; Label: Nor CD (NOR-CD 9933); Format: CD
2001	Dance This: Released: 2001; Label: Bp Records (bp 01010); Format: CD
2006	Sport Rocks: Released: 2006; Label: Jazzaway Records (jarcd027); Format: CD

=== Crimetime Orchestra ===
Year	Title
2005	Life is a Beautiful Monster: Released: April 13, 2005; Label: Jazzaway Records (jarcd009); Format: CD

=== Daniel Levin Trio ===
Year	Title
2008	Fuhuffah: Released: 2008; Label: Clean Feed Records (CF129); Format: CD

=== Eivind Aarseth ===
Year	Title
1997	Électronique Noire: Released: 1997; Label: Jazzland Rec/Universal (558 128-2); Format: CD

=== The Electrics ===
Year	Title	comment
2002	Chain of Accidents: Released: 2002; Label: Ayler (aylCD-035); Format: CD	
2006	Live at Glenn Miller Café: Released: 2006; Label: Ayler (aylCD-034); Format: CD	Live

=== Element ===
Year	Title
1996	Element: Released: 1996; Label: Turn Left Prod (001); Format: CD
1999	Shaman: Released: 1999; Label: Bp Records (bp 99001cd); Format: CD

=== Evan Parker / Ingebrigt Håker Flaten ===
Year	Title
2009	The Brewery Tap: Released: 24 February 2009; Label: Smalltown Superjazzz (STSJ 160CD); Format: CD

=== Fredrik Nordström Quintet ===
Year	Title
2005	No Sooner Said Than Done: Released: February, 2005; Label: Moserobie Records (CD029); Format: CD

=== Free Fall ===
Year	Title
2003	Furnace: Released: 2003; Label: Wobbly Rail (wob013); Format: CD
2005	Amsterdam Funk: Released: 2005; Label: Smalltown Superjazz (STS095CD); Format: CD
2007	The Point in a Line: Released: 2007; Label: Smalltown Superjazz (STSJ142CD); Format: CD

=== Ingebrigt Håker Flaten / Håkon Kornstad ===
Year	Title
2008	Elise: Released: 2008; Label: Compunctio (COMP CD002); Format: CD

=== Ingoma ===
Year	Title
2000	Ingoma: Released: 2000; Label: Sheer Sound (SSCD 053); Format: CD

=== IPA ===
Year	Title
2009	Lorena: Released: May 25, 2009; Label: Bolage (BLGCD008); Format: CD

=== Jazzmob ===
Year	Title	Comment
1999	The Truth: Released: 1999; Label: BeBopOrBeDead (1999); Format: 2CD	Live

=== Mazzarella / Häker Flaten / Ra ===
Year	Title	comment
2015	Azimuth (Live At Constellation): Released: 2015; Label: Astral Spirits (AS023), Monofonus Press (MF103); Format: CD	Live

=== Michiyo Yagi, Ingebrigt Håker Flaten & Paal Nilssen-Love ===
Year	Title	comment
2006	Live! at the SuperDeluxe: Released: August, 2006; Label: Idiolect/Bomba Records (BOM26002); Format: CD	Live

=== No spagetti edition ===
Year	Title
2001	Listen... And Tell Me What It Was: Released: July 7, 2001; Label: Sofa (SOFA506); Format: CD

=== Ole Henrik Giørts / Lars Saabye Christensen ===
Year	Title
1999	Skrapjern & Silke: Released: 1999; Label: Grappa (GRCD 4159); Format: CD

=== Petter Wettre Trio / The Trio ===
Year	Title
1998	meet the locals: Released: 1998; Label: Resonant Music (RM3-2); Format: CD
1999	In Color: Released: 1999; Label: Resonant Music (RM5-2); Format: CD
2001	The Mystery Unfolds: Released: 2001; Label: Bp Records (bp 01009); Format: CD

=== (((Powerhouse Sound))) ===
Year	Title
2007	Oslo/Chicago: (((Breaks))): Released: March, 2007; Label: Atavistic (ALP1772CD); Format: 2CD

=== San ===
Year	Title
1997	Song: Released: 1997; Label: Nor CD (NOR-CD 9720); Format: CD

=== School Days ===
Year	Title	comment
2000	Crossing Division: Released: 2000; Label: Okka Disk (OD12037); Format: CD	
2002	The music of Norman Howard: Released: 2002; Label: Anagram Records (ANA LP 001); Format: LP	Side A: The Thing with guests; Side B: School Days with Mats Gustafsson
2002	In Our Times: Released: 2002; Label: Okka Disk (OD12041); Format: CD	

=== Scorch Trio ===
Year	Title
2002	Scorch Trio: Released: February 18, 2002; Label: Rune Grammofon (RCD 2025); Format: CD, 2LP
2004	Luggumt: Released: October 11, 2004; Label: Rune Grammofon (RCD 2040); Format: CD, 2LP
2008	Brolt: Released: April 21, 2008; Label: Rune Grammofon (RCD 2074); Format: CD, 2LP, 2CD
2010	Melaza: Released: October 25, 2010; Label: Rune Grammofon (RCD 2104); Format: CD, LP
2011	Made In Norway: Released: November 9, 2011; Label: Rune Grammofon (RCD 2119); Format: 2LP, Limited Edition, White
2016	XXX: Released: October 14, 2016; Label: Rune Grammofon (RCD 2187); Format: 4LP

=== Sigurd Køhn Quartet ===
Year	Title
1996	More Pepper, Please: Released: March 26, 1996; Label: Norway Music (106); Format: CD

=== The Source ===
Year	Title	comment
1994	Olemanns kornett: Released: 1994; Label: Curling Legs (CLCD 10); Format: CD	
1996	The Source: Of Christmas: Released: 1996; Label: Curling Legs (CLCD 21); Format: CD	
2000	Roadwork, Vol. 2: The MotorSourceMassacre: Released: 2000; Label: 3rd Ear (0200); Format: CD	Motorpsycho, The Source and Deathprod live

=== Stephen Gauci's Basso Continuo ===
Year	Title
2007	Nididhyasana: Released: 2007; Label: Clean Feed Records (CF101); Format: CD

=== The Thing ===
Year	Title	Comment
2000	The Thing: Released: 2000; Label: Crazy Wisdom (CW001); Format: CD	
2001	She Knows...: Released: 2001; Label: Crazy Wisdom (CW006); Format: CD	as The Thing with Joe McPhee
2004	Garage: Released: 2004; Label: Smalltown Superjazzz (STS078CD); Format: CD	
2005	Live at Blå: Released: June, 2005; Label: Smalltown Superjazzz (STSJ099CD); Format: CD	Live
2006	Action Jazz: Released: 2006; Label: Smalltown Superjazzz (STSJ123CD); Format: CD	
2007	Immediate Sound: Released: 2007; Label: Smalltown Superjazzz (STSJ105CD); Format: CD	as The Thing with Ken Vandermark
2008	Now And Forever: Released: 2008; Label: Smalltown Superjazzz (STSJ106CD); Format: 3CD+DVD	Box set containing The Thing, She Knows..., new improv session Gluttony and live DVD Live at Øya
2009	Bag It!: Released: June 15, 2009; Label: Smalltown Superjazzz (STSJ155CD); Format: CD	
2009	Shinjuku Crawl: Released: October, 2009; Label: Smalltown Superjazzz (STSJ169CD); Format: CD	as The Thing With Otomo Yoshihide
2013	Boot!: Released: November 12, 2013; Label: The Thing (TTRCD001); Format: CD	
2015	Shake: Released October 30, 2015; Label The Thing (TTRCD005); Format: CD	

See also The Music of Norman Howard, an album by School Days and The Thing.

==== Two Bands and a Legend ====
Year	Title	Comment
2005	Sounds Like A Sandwich: Released: March, 2005; Label: Smalltown Superjazzz (STSJ103CD); Format: CD	as The Thing with Cato Salsa Experience and Joe McPhee; EP
2007	Two Bands And A Legend: Released: March, 2007; Label: Smalltown Superjazzz (STSJ104CD); Format: CD	as Two Bands and a Legend
2007	I See You Baby: Released: 2007; Label: Smalltown Superjazzz (STSJ130CD); Format: CD	as Two Bands and a Legend; EP

=== Townhouse Orchestra ===
Year	Title	Comment
2005	Townorchestrahouse: Released: August, 2005; Label: Clean Feed Records (CF041 CD); Format: CD	Live
2008	Belle Ville: Released: 2008; Label: Clean Feed Records (CF125 CD); Format: 2CD	

=== Trinity ===
Year	Title
2004	Sparkling: Released: April 13, 2005; Label: Jazzaway Records (jarcd005); Format: CD
2009	Breaking The Mold: Released: 2009; Label: Clean Feed Records (CF139); Format: CD

=== Williams / Håker Flaten / Daisy ===
Year	Title
2013	Moments Form: Released: September 2013; Label: Idyllic Noise (IDNO 0010); Format: CD

=== Zim Ngqawana ===
Year	Title
1999	Zimology: Released: 1999; Label: Sheer Sound (SSCD 038); Format: CD

== Compilations ==
Year	Title	Ensemble
2002	Money Will Ruin Everything: Released: November 10, 2003; Label: Rune Grammofon (RCD 2032); Format: 2CD	Scorch Trio
2006	Until Human Voices Wake Us And We Drown: Released: April 24, 2006; Label: Rune Grammofon (RLP 2050); Format: 5x 10" vinyl	Scorch Trio
2007	Runeology 3: Released: July 1, 2007; Label: Rune Grammofon (RCDS3); Format: CD	Scorch Trio

== Other appearances ==
=== Friko ===
Year	Title
2006	The Journey To Mandoola: Released: 2006; Label: C+C Records (CCD032); Format: CD

=== Mungolian Jet Set ===
Year	Title
2006	Beauty Came To Us In Stone: Released: 2006; Label: Jazzland Rec/Universal (987 320-2); Format: CD

=== The Samuel Jackson Five ===
Year	Title
2005	Easily Misunderstood: Released: 2005; Label: Honest Abe Records (HACD02); Format: CD

=== Susanna ===
Year	Title
2007	Sonata Mix Dwarf Cosmos: Released: August 20, 2007; Label: Rune Grammofon (RCD 2066); Format: CD

== See also ==
- Paal Nilssen-Love discography
- Rune Grammofon discography
