= Pit Inn (jazz club) =

Jazz club in Shinjuku, Tokyo, Japan

Pit Inn (ピットイン)
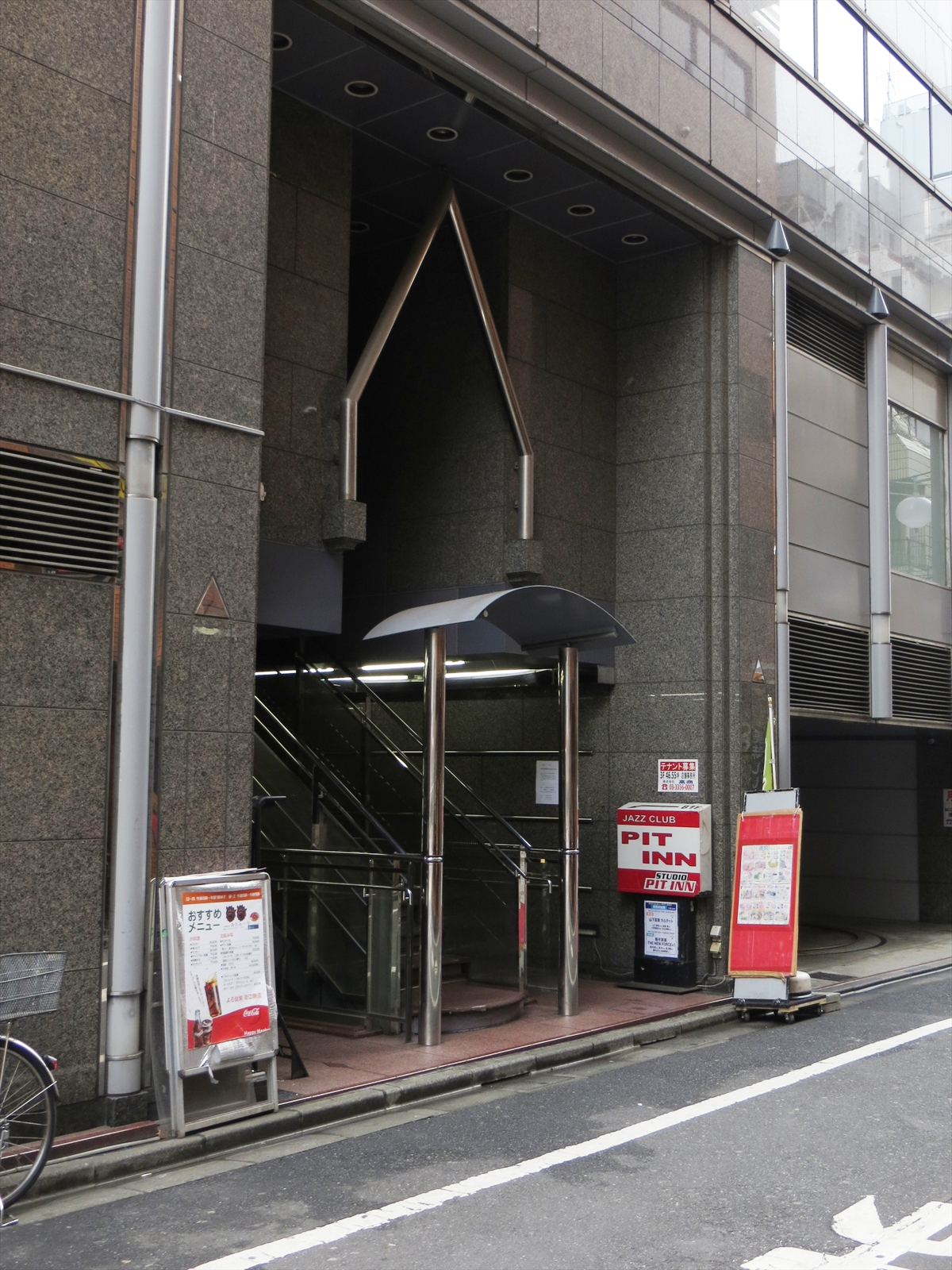
- Second Pit Inn street entrance
- Location: Accord Building B1, Shinjuku 2-12-4, Shinjuku-ku, Tokyo, Japan
- Type: Nightclub
- Event: Jazz

Construction
- Opened: 24 December 1965

Website
- http://www.pit-inn.com/index_e.html

The Pit Inn (ピットイン) is a jazz club in Shinjuku, Tokyo. The original opened in 1965 and was forced by demolition to close in 1992. It re-opened at a different site in Shinjuku later that year. DownBeat wrote in 2019 that the Pit Inn "is almost universally regarded as Japan's most important jazz club".

== First Shinjuku Pit Inn ==
The first Pit Inn was located in Shinjuku 3-chōme. It was named by its owner, Yoshitake Sato, who was a car enthusiast. The first manager was Goro Sakai, who had experience of running jazz clubs. The Pit Inn opened on 24 December 1965, as a jazz coffee shop. By March of the following year, it was hosting live jazz every Friday, Saturday and Sunday, and on other days was being let out to theatre groups and for happenings. Two years later, it became even more focused on jazz and was in the style of a Greenwich Village hangout.

From its early days, both domestic and international musicians played at the Pit Inn. In 1968, for instance, The Thad Jones/Mel Lewis Orchestra played there. Other activities also took place: a photography exhibition in 1968 was an early example. Some of the most prominent Japanese jazz musicians played at the club early in their careers. Many continue to play there regularly, including Terumasa Hino, Sadao Watanabe and Yōsuke Yamashita. Trumpeter Hino played there in 1969. In 1970, the standard entrance charges were 450 Yen for the 2pm show and 500 Yen for the 7pm one, with one drink included. It was described as "A comfortably dingy, often smoke-filled niche for the serious jazz fan [...] over the years it had been home to performances and recordings by some of the world's greatest jazz musicians". In January 1992, it was forced to close, as the building it was part of was being demolished.

== Second Shinjuku Pit Inn ==
The Pit Inn reopened on 5 July 1992, at a new location at the edge of Shinjuku 2-chōme. It continued to offer an afternoon and an evening performance, with the former being for less-well-established musicians. The fortieth anniversary celebrations featured performances by Hino, Watanabe, Yamashita, Keiko Lee, Otomo Yoshihide, John Zorn and others, playing in a nearby rented hall, as the club was too small to accommodate all the fans.

== Other Pit Inns ==
There have been other jazz clubs with the same name in other parts of Tokyo and Japan. The Roppongi Pit Inn was open from at least 1978, (Note: Facebook's page gives 25 August 1977 as the opening date.) and was at Shimei Building B1, Roppongi 3-17-7. In 2003, it contained wooden pews and chairs, and "ceiling-high speakers angle[d] in to cover the entire audience space with crisp sound resolution and exceptional clarity". It closed on 26 July 2004.

== Concert recordings ==
An asterisk (*) indicates that the album was recorded at the Roppongi Pit Inn.

Year recorded	Leader/Band	Title	Label
1974	Sadao Watanabe	At "Pit Inn"	CBS/Sony
1974	Cedar Walton	Pit Inn	East Wind
1978*	Tatsuro Yamashita	It's A Poppin' Time	RCA Records
1979*	Steps Ahead	Smokin' in the Pit	Nippon Columbia
1979*	Kazumi Watanabe	KYLYN Live	Better Days
1979*	Phillip Walker	Blues Show Live at Pit Inn	Yupiteru
1980*	Lowell Fulson	The Blues Show! Live at Pit Inn 1980	
1984	Elvin Jones	Elvin Jones Jazz Machine Live at Pit Inn	Polydor
1985	Mal Waldron and Yōsuke Yamashita	Piano Duo Live at Pit Inn	Village
1986	Manhattan Jazz Quintet	Live at Pit Inn	King
1986	Kenso	Music For Unknown Five Musicians	King
1988	Sun Ra	Cosmo Omnibus Imagiable Illusion	DIW
1989* (Note: "Dancer" & "Love Space" recorded on March 11, 1981.)	Tatsuro Yamashita	Joy	Moon Records
1990 (released)*	Fusanosuke Kondo	Heart of Stone	BMG Victor
1990 (released)*	Fusanosuke Kondo	Go Back to de Basic Thing	BMG Victor
1991 (released)*	Fusanosuke Kondo	Unchained Rhythm	BMG Victor
1992 (released)*	Fusanosuke Kondo	My Innocent Time	BMG Victor
1992	Material	Live in Japan	Jimco
1992	Elvin Jones	Tribute to John Coltrane "A Love Supreme"	Columbia
1994	Masahiko Togashi	So What	Venus
1994	Choi Sun Bae	The Sound of Nature	Universal
1996	DIMENSION	Six Dimension "LIVE"	B-Gram Records
2001	Akira Sakata and TOY	Live at Pit Inn	Q-Train
2005	Akira Sakata	Explosion	P-Jazz
2005	Satoko Fujii	Live!!	Libra
2005	Kei Akagi	Live – Shapes in Sound	Video Arts
2007	The Thing	Shinjuku Crawl	Smalltown Superjazzz
2007	The Thing	Shinjuku Growl	Smalltown Superjazzz
2009	Ted Brown	Live at Pit Inn	Marshmallow
2009	First Meeting	Cut the Rope	Libra
2010	Guerino Mazzola, Heinz Geisser, Shiro Onuma	Dancing the Body of Time	Cadence Jazz
2010	Peter Brötzmann, Keiji Haino, Jim O'Rourke	Two City Blues 1	Trost
2010	Peter Brötzmann, Keiji Haino, Jim O'Rourke	Two City Blues 2	Trost
2011	Mari Yamashita	Live at Pit Inn	Erato
2012	Ken Vandermark and Paal Nilssen-Love	Extended Duos	Audiographic
2012	Jazz Hijokaidan (Akira Sakata)	Made in Japan	Doubtmusic
2013	Masahiko Satoh and Paal Nilssen-Love	Spring Snow	PNL
2014	Takeo Moriyama	Straight Edge	Pit Inn
2014	Otomo Yoshihide	Live at Shinjuku Pit Inn	Pit Inn
2014	Shingo Okudaira	This Is New	Pit Inn
