= The Cherry Thing =

Studio album by Neneh Cherry and The Thing
- Released: 19 June 2012
- Recorded: 2011
- Studio: Harder Sound, London, UK; Atlantis, Stockholm, Sweden
- Genre: Jazz
- Length: 50:59
- Label: Smalltown Supersound
- Producer: Cameron McVey; Robert Harder

Professional ratings
Aggregate scores
Source	Rating
Metacritic	77/100
Review scores
Source	Rating
AllMusic	4/5 stars
Chicago Tribune	3.5/4 stars
Down Beat	4/5 stars
The Financial Times	4/5 stars
The Guardian	4/5 stars

The Cherry Thing is an album by vocalist Neneh Cherry and jazz trio The Thing, consisting of saxophonist Mats Gustafsson, bassist Ingebrigt Håker Flaten and drummer Paal Nilssen-Love. It was recorded in 2011 and released the following year by Smalltown Supersound.

== Background ==
Neneh Cherry's stepfather was free jazz trumpeter Don Cherry. The trio The Thing took their name from a track on Don Cherry's 1966 album Where Is Brooklyn? Cherry "began her career in the 1980s as a teen vocalist in post-punk outfits Rip Rig & Panic and Float Up CP; both melded free jazz and angular funk." Conny Lindstrom, who had produced albums by The Thing, also knew Cherry and suggested that she perform with them.

== Recording and music ==
The Cherry Thing was recorded at Harder Sound Studios in London and Atlantis Studios in Stockholm.

The album contains eight tracks. The two originals are "Sudden Moment" by Gustafsson and "Cashback" by Cherry. The nine-minute version of Suicide's "Dream Baby Dream" "is no less ethereal than the original, but far more sinister; Cherry [...] keeps the beautiful melodic core intact, even as she becomes ever more insistent, showing her dominant authority. Her accompanists build a gorgeous wall of atmospheric tension behind her". Martina Topley-Bird's "Too Tough to Die" "begins sparsely and slowly before Cherry and Gustafsson enter and begin pushing, [...] Cherry's vocal is emboldened with risk, turning the melody in on itself and ululating against the baritone horn. The rhythm sections answers with syncopated breaks and funk." MF Doom's "Accordion" and the Stooges' "Dirt" "are sparse, threatening, and poignant, the former tinged with implied violence, and the latter [...] smolders with raw, dark sensuality." Don Cherry's "Golden Heart" is "an otherworldly meld of Middle Eastern modes and textures and a skeletal lyric frame that displays this group's command of diverse musical languages." On Ornette Coleman's "What Reason", the "nearly mournful presentation, with gorgeous jazz singing by Cherry and restrained yet adventurous soloing by Gustafsson and Håker Flaten, make the tune drip with longing."

== Release ==
The album was released on 19 June 2012. It peaked at number 16 on the Billboard Jazz Albums chart.

== Reception ==
BBC reviewer John Doran stated that the recording was "one of the most enjoyable and original albums of the year". John Fordham of The Guardian commented that the music "dramatically bridges the singer's avant-pop world and the flat-out sax-howling, percussion-thundering soundscape the group have been poleaxing audiences with since 2000." Ben Ratliff of The New York Times wrote that the intentional contrast between Cherry's tenderness and the band's loud aggression sometimes became unbalanced in favour of the latter.

== Track listing ==
1. "Cashback" (Neneh Cherry) – 5:58
2. "Dream Baby Dream" (Martin Rev, Alan Vega) – 8:24
3. "Too Tough to Die" (Martina Topley-Bird) – 5:13
4. "Sudden Moment" (Mats Gustafsson) – 8:26
5. "Accordion" (Daniel Dumile, Otis Jackson, Jr.) – 6:10
6. "Golden Heart" (Don Cherry) – 4:43
7. "Dirt" (David Alexander, James Osterberg, Ron Asheton, Scott Asheton) – 6:47
8. "What Reason" (Ornette Coleman) – 5:18

== Personnel ==
- Neneh Cherry – vocals
- Mats Gustafsson – baritone sax, tenor sax, electronics
- Ingebrigt Håker Flaten – double bass, electric bass, electronics
- Paal Nilssen-Love – drums, percussion

== Charts ==
Chart performance for The Cherry Thing
Chart (2012)	Peak position
Swedish Albums (Sverigetopplistan)	50
