= Action Jazz =

Studio album by The Thing
- Released: 1 June 2006
- Recorded: 19, 20 December 2005
- Studio: Atlantis, Stockholm, Sweden
- Genre: Free jazz
- Label: Smalltown Superjazz
- Producer: The Thing

Action Jazz is an album by The Thing, the trio of saxophonist Mats Gustafsson, bassist Ingebrigt Håker Flaten and drummer Paal Nilssen-Love. It was recorded in December 2005 and released the following year by Smalltown Superjazz.

== Recording and music ==
The album was recorded on 19 and 20 December 2005 at Atlantis Studios in Stockholm. "Ride the Sky" by Lightning Bolt "begins as an act of riff worship, the trio united in devotion to that primordial stomp, before Gustafsson breaks loose, howling pterodactyls fleeing the arcs of hot lava sputtering from his horn." "The Nut/The Light", by Gustafsson's daughter, Alva Melin, are "free-blues" and were recorded earlier by Gustafsson on his solo album Catapult.

== Releases ==
Action Jazz was released on 1 June 2006 by Smalltown Superjazz.

== Reception ==
Professional ratings
Review scores
Source	Rating
All About Jazz	4/5 stars

Stewart Smith of The Quietus described Action Jazz as "More accessible than subsequent releases, [...it] finds a balance between the stoopid-fun [sic] of their garage material, the swing of their [Don] Cherry inspired free-bop, and the open-form weirdness to come."

Writing for All About Jazz, Eyal Hareuveni stated that on Action Jazz, The Thing "deliver one of their heaviest performances," and called the album "another testimony to the success of this group's risk-taking and barrier-shattering attitude."

In a review for Rockfeedback Magazine, Thomas Hannan commented: "It might be because they're so adept at it, it might be because they're playing skewed rock songs, it's probably got something to do with the unrelenting pace and wide eyed wonder at sound itself that The Thing seem to possess and display within every track, but Action Jazz is one heck of a lot of fun."

== Track listing ==
1. "Sounds like a Sandwich" (Cato Salsa) – 02:04
2. "Chiasma" (Yosuke Yamashita) – 04:58
3. "Broken Shadows" (Ornette Coleman) – 02:28
4. "Ride the Sky" (Lightning Bolt) – 02:13
5. "Better Living..." (Mats Gustafsson, Ingebrigt Håker Flaten, Paal Nilssen-Love) – 07:25
6. "Danny's Dream" (Lars Gullin) – 07:33
7. "The Nut/The Light" (Alva Melin) – 06:38
8. "...Through BBQ" (Gustafsson, Flaten, Nilssen-Love) – 09:10
9. "Strayhorn" (Gustafsson) – 07:03

== Personnel ==
- Mats Gustafsson – baritone sax, alto sax, slide sax
- Ingebrigt Håker Flaten – double bass
- Paal Nilssen-Love – drums
