= Pit Inn =

Pit Inn may refer to:

- Pit Inn (jazz club), in Tokyo
- Pit Inn (album), a 1974 Cedar Walton recording made at the above club
