= Woodcuts (album) =

Live album by Peter Brötzmann and Paal Nilssen-Love
- Released: 2010
- Recorded: October 21, 2008
- Venue: Kampenjazz, Oslo
- Genre: Free jazz
- Length: 57:58
- Label: Smalltown Superjazzz; STSJ170CD

Peter Brötzmann chronology
Goosetalks (2010)	Woodcuts (2010)	Live in Wiesbaden (2011)

Woodcuts is a live album by saxophonist Peter Brötzmann and drummer Paal Nilssen-Love. It was recorded on October 21, 2008, at Kampenjazz in Oslo, and was released in 2010 by the Norwegian Smalltown Superjazzz label.

== Reception ==
Professional ratings
Review scores
Source	Rating
AllMusic	4/5 stars
The Free Jazz Collective	4/5 stars
The Guardian	4/5 stars
Tom Hull – on the Web	B+

In a review for AllMusic, Phil Freeman called Nilssen-Love "a genuinely sympathetic partner" for Brötzmann, and wrote: "This disc fascinates from beginning to end, and rewards both close listening and basking in its gale force winds."

The Guardian's John Fordham stated: "For anyone who witnessed the unrelenting earthquake of this pair's dialogues at the Vortex earlier in the year, Woodcuts will be an absorbing reminder, and there's a good deal of rough-hewn lyricism... It's still uncompromising free-jazz, but more varied than you might expect."

Stef Gijssels of The Free Jazz Collective described the album as a "fierce and relentless power play between two masters," and commented: "It works best because Brötzmann does not have to care about other sounds intermingling with his own, he just needs the percussive power to drive him forward, and whatever he does, can move and shout and scream without hitting the borders of other melodic musicians. The result is fireworks from beginning to end."

A reviewer for Burning Ambulance remarked: "these guys have power and stamina, and are going at it—and each other—as hard as they near the finish line as they were when they started. Brötzmann's... blowing as hard, and as creatively, as he ever has in his life... It's just one component of a vast discography, and consequently hard to recommend above all others, but if you’re a Brötzmann fan, this is a damn good one."

Writing for Dusted Magazine, Jason Bivins called the album "fantastic," and wrote: "The dry acoustic of this recording suits the texture of Nilssen-Love's drumming, which is crackling and woody like Roy Haynes crossed with Paul Lovens. It's sometimes been said of Brötzmann... that he simply hurtles himself atop whatever rhythmic base is being provided for him, taking little care to interact... But this opinion isn't fair to the reeds master, and you can certainly hear the intricacy of his interactions in his subtle... inflections and alterations of line in response to the crackle and roll of the drummer."

A writer for All About Jazz praised the track titled "Ye Gods and Little Fishes," stating: "Brotzmann engages his partner's thumping brush patterns in a start-stop succession of rhythmic bursts before a switch to hummingbird sticks. Soon after he tosses a scrap of vintage Ornette into the air and skeet shoots it into shattering shards before coarsening into a grainy vibrato sans Nilssen-Love."

== Track listing ==
1. "Wood Cuts" – 12:47
2. "Glasgow Kiss" – 7:58
3. "Strong and Thin" – 5:50
4. "Rode Hard and Put Up Wet" – 18:36
5. "Ye Gods and Little Fishes" – 8:52
6. "Knuckling" – 4:34

== Personnel ==
- Peter Brötzmann – alto saxophone, tenor saxophone, bass clarinet, B♭ clarinet
- Paal Nilssen-Love – drums, percussion
