= Schlingerland =

Schlingerland / Dynamische Schwingungen

Studio album by Sven-Åke Johansson
- Released: 1972
- Recorded: October 1972
- Studio: Stockholm, Sweden
- Genre: Free jazz
- Length: 46:18
- Label: FMP; SÅJ01
- Producer: Sven-Åke Johansson

Schlingerland / Dynamische Schwingungen (Schlingerland / Dynamic Oscillations) is a solo drum set album by Sven-Åke Johansson. It was recorded during October 1972 in Stockholm, Sweden, and was issued on vinyl later that year by the FMP label as the inaugural release in their SÅJ series. In 2000, it was reissued on CD with an additional track by Atavistic Records as part of their Unheard Music Series. FMP reissued the album on vinyl in 2019, and in 2020, it was again reissued on vinyl by Cien Fuegos, an imprint of Trost Records.

Schlingerland, Johansson's debut album, is recognized as one of the first solo free jazz albums by a drummer. When asked whether the music was composed or improvised, Johansson stated that "it's an idea, more of a concept, no written music." He named Shelley Manne and Sunny Murray as influences, but noted that "this was my own style."

== Reception ==
Professional ratings
Review scores
Source	Rating
AllMusic	2/5 stars
The Penguin Guide to Jazz	3/4 stars

In a review for AllMusic, William York wrote: "Johansson's studied, deliberate performances give listeners a real in-depth chance to hear the fundamental elements -- how he layers different time signatures and tempos on the various parts of his kit to summon up a circular sort of flow that is free of any regular pulse." However, he noted that "while Schlingerland makes it easy to gain a respect for Johansson's craft and command of his instrument, listeners will have to show an unusual amount of patience and attentiveness to really get much out of this album."

Derek Taylor of All About Jazz stated: "For a disc dominated by drums this set is surprisingly subdued and quiet. Johansson doesn't seem to be concerned with testing the levels of bedlam and din achievable through his kit. He's far more occupied with plumbing the possibilities of texture, timbre and space." Another AAJ reviewer commented: "A unique document, Schlingerland fills a gap in the documentation of '70s European improvisation. At the same time, it retains a surprisingly contemporary sound which reverberates in the ear, mind, and heart of the 21st century listener."

Exclaim!'s David Dacks noted that Johansson is "not playing like a soloist; he's creating a soundscape of rhythm," and remarked: "The effect is much like the trance inducement of the Gnawa Musicians of Marrakech, or even a good rainstorm. The most remarkable thing about Schlingerland is Johansson's amazing control over each tone of his drum kit, which sounds like it took hours to tune up."

The authors of The Penguin Guide to Jazz Recordings called the album "an entertaining glance back" where "the drummer simply rambles around the kit."

Writing for The Quietus, Jennifer Lucy Allan wrote: "Johansson uses the kit so the sound accumulates like clouds, gaining enough of a fullness to make you wonder why we would ever need to hear other instruments again."

== Track listing ==
Composed by Sven-Åke Johansson.

1. "Nahbild" – 18:17
2. "Kurze Studie" – 6:47 (bonus track on CD reissue)
3. "Etwas Entfernt Vom Mikrofon" – 21:16

== Personnel ==
- Sven-Åke Johansson – drum set
