= Opened, But Hardly Touched =

Live album by Peter Brötzmann, Harry Miller, and Louis Moholo
- Released: 1981
- Recorded: November 5 and 6, 1980
- Venue: The Flöz, Berlin
- Genre: Free jazz
- Length: 1:28:09
- Label: FMP; 0840/0850
- Producer: Jost Gebers, Peter Brötzmann

Opened, But Hardly Touched is a live album by saxophonist Peter Brötzmann, double bassist Harry Miller, and drummer Louis Moholo. It was recorded on November 5 and 6, 1980, at the Flöz in Berlin, and was released on vinyl as a two-album set in 1981 by FMP/Free Music Production. In 2014, the album was reissued on CD by the Cien Fuegos imprint of Trost Records.

The album is the trio's second release, following The Nearer the Bone, the Sweeter the Meat (FMP, 1979).

== Reception ==
Professional ratings
Review scores
Source	Rating
AllMusic	3/5 stars
The Free Jazz Collective	5/5 stars
The Penguin Guide to Jazz	3.5/4 stars
The Virgin Encyclopedia of Jazz	3/5 stars

In an article for DownBeat, Peter Kostakis wrote: "The boundaries between composition and improvisation are intentionally blurred. Yet the trio's explorations manage an in-built tension and variety that scarcely lapses into boredom."

The authors of The Penguin Guide to Jazz Recordings stated that the trio setting "bring[s] out some of Brötzmann's best playing," and called the music "big and brawling encounters which realign the saxophonist's playing with a 'mainstream' free-jazz approach."

The Free Jazz Collective's Martin Schray described the album as "a must-have," and "the missing link between [Brötzmann's] old trios, his rock excursions in the 1980s, his sax drum duos and Die Like A Dog." He commented: "Moholo and Miller are his anchor, never denying their South African background but they combine it with a lot of western influences. Moholo sometimes even mumbles, groans and shouts in the background – as if it was an anticipation to what Brötzmann was going to do soon with Ronald Shannon Jackson and Last Exit."

Milo Fine of Cadence noted: "Sometimes spontaneous heads are created and developed, at other times, the sheer energy of intent keeps things moving and interesting. There is plenty of space for each player to make solo statements, and, at times, each musician drops out allowing for duo and a cappella sections."

== Track listing ==
All music by Peter Brötzmann, Harry Miller, and Louis Moholo.

1. "Eine Kleine Nachtmarie" – 9:28
2. "Trotzdem Und Dennoch" – 9:28
3. "Special Request for Malibu" – 22:20
4. "Opened, But Hardly Touched" – 21:08
5. "Double Meaning" – 22:32

== Personnel ==
- Peter Brötzmann – alto saxophone, tenor saxophone, baritone saxophone, E♭ clarinet, tárogató
- Harry Miller – double bass
- Louis Moholo – drums
