= Firm Roots =

Firm Roots may refer to:

- Firm Roots (Cedar Walton album), (Muse, 1974)
- Firm Roots (Clifford Jordan album), (SteepleChase, 1975)
- Firm Roots, Silent Poets album, (Toy's Factory, 1996)
