= The Nearer the Bone, the Sweeter the Meat =

Studio album by Peter Brötzmann, Harry Miller, and Louis Moholo
- Released: 1979
- Recorded: August 27, 1979
- Studio: FMP Studio, Berlin
- Genre: Free jazz
- Length: 43:59
- Label: FMP; 0690
- Producer: Jost Gebers, Peter Brötzmann

The Nearer the Bone, the Sweeter the Meat is an album by saxophonist Peter Brötzmann, double bassist Harry Miller, and drummer Louis Moholo. It was recorded on August 27, 1979, at FMP Studio in Berlin, and was released on vinyl later that year by FMP/Free Music Production. In 2012, the album was reissued on CD by the Cien Fuegos imprint of Trost Records.

In 1980, the trio recorded a second album titled Opened, But Hardly Touched (FMP, 1981).

== Reception ==
Professional ratings
Review scores
Source	Rating
AllMusic	3/5 stars
The Encyclopedia of Popular Music	4/5 stars
The Penguin Guide to Jazz	3.5/4 stars

In a review for AllMusic, Eugene Chadbourne noted that the sound of the trio "hearkened back to the solid feel of black free jazz rather than splintering the brain with the seeming anarchy of the European free jazz scene of the time," and wrote: "While much of the European scene at the time veered toward inexplicable intensity, this performance is reminiscent of players such as Pharoah Sanders, with a slow, steady build toward a musical inferno guided by a similar feeling of intense spirituality."

The authors of The Penguin Guide to Jazz Recordings stated that the trio setting "bring[s] out some of Brötzmann's best playing," and called the music "big and brawling encounters which realign the saxophonist's playing with a 'mainstream' free-jazz approach."

Milo Fine of Cadence described the album as "a very satisfying effort giving Brötzmann yet another context in which to explore his art," and commented: "Due to the relatively steady drive of Miller... and Moholo... the overall effect of these medium length improvisations is effective static energy that nonetheless pushes forward."

== Track listing ==
All music by Peter Brötzmann, Harry Miller, and Louis Moholo.

1. "Long Time Service" – 9:55
2. "Kucken und drücken" – 13:09
3. "The Nearer the Bone, the Sweeter the Meat" – 15:38
4. "Schnell im Biss" – 5:17

== Personnel ==
- Peter Brötzmann – E♭ clarinet, A clarinet, bass clarinet, soprano saxophone, alto saxophone, tenor saxophone
- Harry Miller – double bass
- Louis Moholo – drums
