= Fumio Itabashi =

Japanese pianist and composer (born 1949)

Fumio Itabashi (板橋 文夫, Itabashi Fumio; born March 8, 1949 in Tochigi) is a Japanese pianist and composer.

Itabashi began playing piano when he was eight years old, and studied music formally at Kunitachi College of Music, where he first started playing jazz. In the 1970s he worked with Terumasa Hino, Takeo Moriyama, and Sadao Watanabe, in addition to leading his own small ensembles. In the 1980s he did several international tours as a sideman with Ray Anderson and Elvin Jones, and in the 1990s worked with Leo Etoh in a traditional Japanese percussion ensemble called Wa Daiko.

In addition to his work in jazz, Itabashi also works as a film score composer, and has done soundtracks for Chinese and Japanese motion pictures.
