= Shake (The Thing album) =

Studio album by The Thing
- Released: 30 October 2015
- Recorded: 1, 2 June 2015
- Genre: Free jazz
- Label: The Thing

Professional ratings
Review scores
Source	Rating
AllMusic	4/5 stars

Shake is an album by The Thing, the trio of saxophonist Mats Gustafsson, bassist Ingebrigt Håker Flaten and drummer Paal Nilssen-Love. The album was recorded in June 2015 and released that year by the band's eponymous label.

== Recording and music ==
The album was recorded on 1 and 2 June 2015. For "Aim", Anna Högberg (alto sax) and Goran Kajfes (cornet) were added to the trio: "Based on a simple six-note vamp, the hypnotic intro gives way to a complete communion of collective improvisation before stripping itself back to a skeletal whisper of its theme." "Til Jord Skal Du Bli", "Sigill" and "Fra Jord Er Du Kommet" "are unusually reflective for The Thing".

== Releases ==
Shake was released on 30 October 2015 by The Thing's eponymous label. It was released on CD, vinyl and cassette.

== Reception ==
Thom Jurek's review for AllMusic concluded that "This is free jazz-funk for those who insist on an identifiable center in avant music. The Thing are masters at this and, as a result, can always push further into sound and song and a nearly danceable collective conversation."

== Track listing ==
1. "Viking Disco/Perfection" (Paal Nilssen-Love/Ornette Coleman) – 6:29
2. "Til Jord Skal Du Bli" (Ingebrigt Håker Flaten) – 8:28
3. "The Nail Will Burn " (Loop) – 2:43
4. "Sigill" (Colin Bergh) – 5:39
5. "Aim" (Mats Gustafsson) – 13:15
6. "Bota Fogo" – 7:28
7. "Fra Jord Er Du Kommet" (Flaten) – 7:23

== Personnel ==
- Mats Gustafsson – baritone sax, tenor sax
- Ingebrigt Håker Flaten – double bass, electric bass
- Paal Nilssen-Love – drums, percussion
- Anna Högberg – alto sax (track 5)
- Goran Kajfes – cornet (track 5)
