= Valina =

Austrian band

- Origin: Linz, Austria
- Genres: Indie rock, noise rock, post-hardcore
- Years active: 1995-2006
- Labels: 54°40' or Fight!, Joyful Noise Recordings, Trost Records
- Past members: Anatol Bogendorfer; Husbert Huber; Anselm Dürrschmid; Claus Harringer

Valina was an indie, noise rock, post-hardcore group from Linz, Austria, which existed from 1995 to 2016. They released several records on Trost Records and played many shows in Europe, the United States, Russia, Mexico and South America. The last four full-length albums were recorded by Steve Albini in Chicago. The band began recording music in 1997, releasing several 7-inch records and full-length albums. The full-length albums have been released on their Austrian label Trost Records. Both Vagabond and the Epode EP have been released in the States by 54°40' or Fight!. On April 14, 2009, Valina's album, A tempo! a tempo!, was released throughout the United States by Joyful Noise Recordings. The album "Container" was released on March 28, 2014, and their final album "In Position" was released in January 2016.

== Members ==
- Anatol Bogendorfer
- Husbert Huber
- Anselm Dürrschmid
- Claus Harringer (drums from 1995-2006)

== Discography ==
=== Albums ===
- In Position (2016)
- Container (2014)
- A tempo! a tempo! (2009)
- Vagabond (2003)
- Into Arsenal of Codes (2000)

== Extended plays ==
- Epode (2005)

== 7" records ==
- "Poor & Obscure" (1997)
- "Ship to Escape" (2002)
- "Escort of Soda" (2004) w/ Sickbay
