= Boot! =

Studio album by The Thing
- Released: 12 November 2013
- Recorded: 11–13 February 2013. Grand Sport studio, Oslo
- Genre: Free jazz
- Label: The Thing
- Producer: The Thing

Boot! is an album by The Thing, the trio of saxophonist Mats Gustafsson, bassist Ingebrigt Håker Flaten and drummer Paal Nilssen-Love. The album was recorded in February 2013 and released that year by the band's new, eponymous, label.

== Recording and music ==
The album was recorded from 11 to 13 February 2013 at Grand Sport studio in Oslo. Two of the six tracks are jazz standards, three were written by the band and one was composed by Flaten.

John Coltrane's "India" contains white noise bass, repeated baritone saxophone patterns and aggressive drumming around them, then breaks into low baritone improvisations.

On "Reboot", "bass and sax trade riffs; they establish interlocking sound patterns as Nilssen-Love's drums forcefully prod, until all hell breaks loose, as Eastern European wedding music ripples against metallic vamps and driving free improvisation."

"Heaven", a Duke Ellington composition, was arranged by Gustafsson. It begins quietly and gradually moves away from the melody and then the harmony of the theme.

Flaten's "Red River" is a threatening, noise rock piece.

"Boot!" develops gradually, with bass and drums providing support for Gustafsson's playing.

"Epillog" starts with repeated bass and saxophone tones that become stretched. "When Nilssen-Love enters with rumbling, stampeding tom-toms, things are already unhinged, the music pushes the margin and cuts free of restraint, entering into its own sonic language, dialoguing poetically with color, tone, space, and texture. It moves so far out, it has to come back; and so it does via the drummer's accelerated, circular funky breaks; they prod the band to climb down, eventually finding a grooving rock & roll center to close".

== Releases ==
Boot! was released in 2013 as the first album from the band's eponymous record label.

== Reception ==
Professional ratings
Review scores
Source	Rating
AllMusic	4/5 stars
Down Beat	4/5 stars
The Financial Times	4/5 stars
All About Jazz	4.5/5 stars

The Down Beat reviewer commented that "The exclamatory bark of the album's title captures its attitude, which amasses the low end of the sonic spectrum for a blunt-force kick to the gut" and "The trio members continue to be masters of intensity, never losing focus or form no matter how punishing their approach."

In a review for AllMusic, Thom Jurek wrote: "Boot! not only refines what The Thing do, it extends them into a breathtaking sphere where a Babel-like musical conversation takes place, elevating all of its singular elements into a rough, raucous, glorious whole."

Writing for All About Jazz, Mark Corroto commented: "These three musicians are, to be sure, rock stars. Ones that can also make Duke and Coltrane smile."

== Track listing ==
1. "India" (John Coltrane) – 6:54
2. "Reboot" (Mats Gustafsson, Ingebrigt Håker Flaten, Paal Nilssen-Love) – 10:16
3. "Heaven" (Duke Ellington) – 9:50
4. "Red River" (Flaten) – 8:01
5. "Boot!" (Gustafsson, Flaten, Nilssen-Love) – 7:10
6. "Epilog" (Gustafsson, Flaten, Nilssen-Love) – 13:59

== Personnel ==
- Mats Gustafsson – bass sax, baritone sax, tenor sax, alto sax
- Ingebrigt Håker Flaten – electric bass
- Paal Nilssen-Love – drums
