= The Thing (The Thing album) =

Studio album by The Thing
- Released: 2000
- Recorded: 10, 11 February 2000
- Studio: Atlantis, Stockholm, Sweden
- Genre: Free jazz
- Label: Crazy Wisdom/Universal
- Producer: Christian Falk, Mats Gustafsson

Professional ratings
Review scores
Source	Rating
AllMusic	3.5/5 stars
The Penguin Guide to Jazz	4/4 stars

The Thing is an album by saxophonist Mats Gustafsson, bassist Ingebrigt Håker Flaten and drummer Paal Nilssen-Love, who then took the album title as the name of their trio. The album was recorded in February 2000 and released that year by Crazy Wisdom, part of Universal.

== Recording and music ==
The album was recorded on 10 and 11 February 2000, in Atlantis Studios, Stockholm. Four of the six tracks are interpretations of compositions by Don Cherry.

== Releases ==
The album was first released in 2000 by Crazy Wisdon, part of Universal Group. It was also included in the box set Now and Forever in 2007.

== Reception ==
The Thing received a positive review from The Penguin Guide to Jazz, which described it as "A great modern free-jazz record". The AllMusic reviewer summarised that "Gustafsson's furious and dense delivery receives great backing from Håker Flaten, who moves effortlessly from pizzicato to arco, and Nilssen-Love, who has the necessary energy to sustain the saxophonist's sonic onslaught", but criticised the performances on one track as "self-indulgence".

== Track listing ==
1. "Awake Nu" (Don Cherry) – 5:06
2. "Mopti" (Cherry) – 11:35
3. "Cherryco" (Cherry) – 8:45
4. "Ode to Don" (Mats Gustafsson, Ingebrigt Håker Flaten, Paal Nilssen-Love) – 3:37
5. "The Art of Steve Roney – Smilin'" (Gustafsson, Flaten, Nilssen-Love) – 2:38
6. "Trans-Love Airways" (Cherry) – 19:17

== Personnel ==
- Mats Gustafsson – tenor sax, alto sax
- Ingebrigt Håker Flaten – double bass
- Paal Nilssen-Love – drums, percussion
