= Mobius (album) =

Studio album by Cedar Walton
- Released: 1975
- Recorded: 1975; RCA Studios, New York City
- Genre: Jazz
- Length: 40:27
- Label: RCA; APL1 1009

Cedar Walton chronology
Pit Inn (1974)	Mobius (1975)	Eastern Rebellion (1975)

Professional ratings
Review scores
Source	Rating
Allmusic	2.5/5 stars

Mobius is an album by pianist Cedar Walton recorded in 1975 and released on the RCA label in 1975.

== Reception ==
Allmusic awarded the album 2½ stars.

== Track listing ==
All compositions by Cedar Walton except as indicated

1. "Blue Trane" (John Coltrane) – 10:04
2. "Soho" – 10:32
3. "Off Minor" (Thelonious Monk) – 7:54
4. "The Maestro" – 6:16
5. "Road Island Red" – 5:41

== Personnel ==
- Cedar Walton – keyboards, arranger
- Roy Burrowes – trumpet
- Wayne Andre – trombone
- Charles Davis, Frank Foster – saxophones
- Ryo Kawasaki – electric guitar
- Gordon Edwards – bass
- Steve Gadd – drums
- Omar Clay, Ray Mantilla – percussion
- Adrienne Albert, Lani Groves – vocals
