= Takeo Moriyama =

Japanese jazz drummer (born 1945)

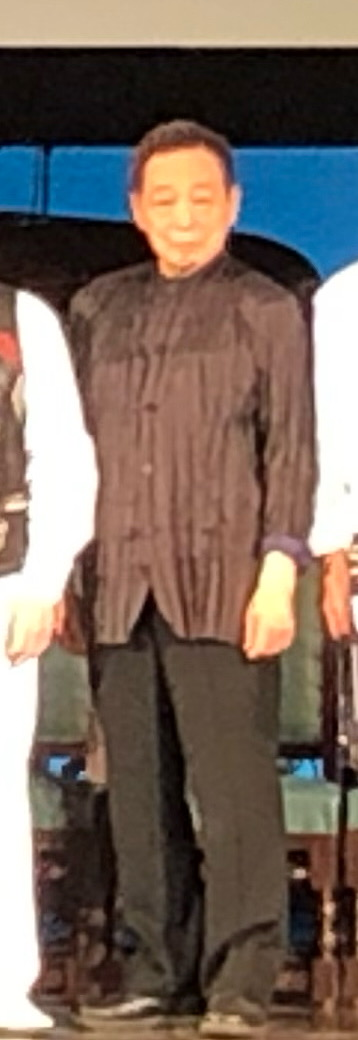
Takeo Moriyama in 2022

Takeo Moriyama (森山 威男, Moriyama Takeo; born January 27, 1945 in Katsunuma (present Kōshū) in Yamanashi Prefecture) is a Japanese jazz drummer.

Moriyama played piano as a child before switching to drums in his late teens. He then attended the Tokyo University of the Arts, taking a degree in percussion performance. He joined Yosuke Yamashita's small group in 1967, and went on several international tours with the group until leaving it in 1975. He moved to Nagoya in 1977 and began leading his own groups. In addition to Yamashita he has performed or recorded with Aki Takase, Akira Miyazawa, Fumio Itabashi, Masahiko Satoh, Peter Brötzmann, Nobuyoshi Ino, Takehiro Honda, and Manfred Schoof.

== Discographical notes ==
- Takeo Moriyama Percussion Ensemble: Full Load (1975), with Kazunori Momose, Yasunori Yamaguchi
- Manfred Schoof, Akira Sakata, Yosuke Yamashita, Takeo Moriyama: Distant Thunder (Enja, 1975)
- Takeo Moriyama Quartet with Mukai: Hush-a-bye (Union, 1978), with Shigeharu Mukai, Kazumi Odagiri, Fumio Itabashi, Hideaki Mochizuki
- East Plants (Vap, 1983), with Hideaki Mochizuki, Yoji Sadanari, Shuichi Enomoto, Toshihiko Inoue
- Green River (Enja, 1984), with Hideaki Mochizuki, Shuichi Enomoto, Toshi Inoue
- Takehiro Honda, Nobuyoshi Ino, Takeo Moriyama: In a Sentimental Mood (Sony, 1985)
- Live at Lovely (DIW Records, 1991), with Hideaki Mochizuki, Fumio Itabashi, Toshihiko Inoue
