= Pit Inn (album) =

Live album by Cedar Walton
- Released: 1975
- Recorded: December 23, 1974; Shinjuku Pit Inn, Tokyo, Japan
- Genre: Jazz
- Label: East Wind; EW 7009
- Producer: Nippon Phonogram Co., Ltd.

Cedar Walton chronology
Firm Roots (1973)	Pit Inn (1975)	Mobius (1975)

Pit Inn is a live album by pianist Cedar Walton recorded at the Pit Inn jazz club in Tokyo in 1974 and released on the Japanese East Wind label.

== Track listing ==
All compositions by Cedar Walton except as indicated

1. "Suite Sunday" – 10:01
2. "Con Alma" (Dizzy Gillespie) – 7:40
3. "Without A Song" (Vincent Youmans, Billy Rose, Edward Eliscu) – 8:50
4. "Suntory Blues" – 9:23
5. "'Round Midnight" (Thelonious Monk) – 7:01
6. "Fantasy In 'D'" – 7:18
7. "Bleeker St. Theme" – 2:52

== Personnel ==
- Cedar Walton – piano
- Sam Jones – bass
- Billy Higgins – drums
