= Nobuyasu Okabayashi =

Japanese folk singer-songwriter (born 1946)

- Born: July 22, 1946 (age 80); Ōmihachiman, Shiga, Japan
- Genres: Folk; folk rock
- Occupations: Singer-songwriter; musician; record producer
- Instruments: Vocals; guitar
- Years active: 1968–present
- Labels: Victor; URC; CBS/Sony; Nippon Columbia; Invitation; Eastworld; Nippon Crown; Fuji
- Website: www.fuji-okabayashi.com

Nobuyasu Okabayashi (Japanese: 岡林 信康, Hepburn: Okabayashi Nobuyasu; born July 22, 1946) is a Japanese folk singer-songwriter whose career spans more than 50 years. Often compared to Bob Dylan, Rolling Stone Japan called him an icon of Japan's politically turbulent 1960s and 1970s. Okabayashi made his debut in 1968 and quickly earned the nickname the "God of Folk" (フォークの神様, Fōku no Kamisama) with his protest songs. He spent 1975 to 1981 eschewing this title by experimenting with genres such as enka, pop, and new wave. Inspired by the rhythms of Japanese Bon Odori and Korean samul nori, he then created his own genre in the mid-1980s and 1990s that he dubbed "enyatotto" (エンヤトット).

== Early life ==
His childhood home was his father's church (established by William Merrell Vories, the founder of OMI Medical Supplies Corp). After receiving his education at Oumikyoudai Middle School and Shiga Prefecture Ritsuyoukai City Senior High School, in 1966 Okabayashi entered the theology department of Doushisha College. Originally a Christian, he began to doubt his family's work with juvenile delinquents and searched for an escape. He dropped out of college, threw himself into socialism, and after meeting folk singer Tomoya Takaishi, he started to play guitar.

== Career ==
In 1968, Okabayashi participated in the third Folk Camp in Tokyo. He made his debut that September on Victor Records with "Sanya Blues" (山谷ブルース), a song about living in Sanya with day laborers. The following year, he released singles such as "Friend", "The Letter", "The Tuli's Applique", "The Fuck-Off Song", and "The Skeleton Song". Because of the material in his songs, many of them were banned from broadcasting. He was quickly labelled the "God of Folk", but due to the Workers Music Council's strife, the pressure he felt to maintain his image, and the intentions of his own camp (he was already beginning to feel he had reached a dead end with his direct protest songs, and he was exploring transitioning to rock as a solution), in May 1969 he temporarily disappeared from the public eye. His first album, Watashi wo Danzai Seyo, was released by URC (Underground Record Club) in August of that year. In 1970, an unsigned band newly renamed Happy End started to play as Okabayashi's backing band and together they recorded his second album Miru Mae ni Tobe. However, 1971 was the last year of his headlining Off-Season Flowering Live Performance at Hibiya Open-Air Concert Hall, as well as the last year of the Folk Jamboree event in which he participated. Thus, once again, Okabayashi disappeared from the stage.

In 1973, Okabayashi started his career back up and changed labels to CBS/Sony. He released the albums Kin'iro no Lion (1973) and Dare zo Kono-ko ni Ai no Te o (1975), which were produced by Happy End drummer Takashi Matsumoto. Songs containing Dylan-esque metaphors such as "Until That Daughter is Far Away" and "The 26 Numbers of Fall" were one part of his albums that were well received, but as usual, his fans' expectations were high. Okabayashi was removed several times from the list of guest performers at concerts. Eventually, the musician moved to an agricultural community in Kyoto Prefecture.

During this time he gravitated towards enka. He collaborated with famed enka singer Hibari Misora on "The Moon of the Night Train". In 1975, Okabayashi changed labels to Nippon Columbia, the same label as Misora, released Utsushi-e and a self-narrated album called Love Songs. In 1978, Okabayashi released the album Serenade and developed a strongly parody-flavored sound, which he dubbed his "new music-stage." He then returned to Victor, on their sub-label Invitation, and strengthened this new sound with the albums Machi wa Sutekina Carnival (1979), Storm (1980), and Graffiti (1981). Storm was produced by Kazuhiko Katō and features the Moon Riders as Okabayashi's backing band. The songs that came to represent this period for Okabayashi were "Good-bye My Darling", "A Love Song to Lift You Up", and "Face the Mountain". In 1980, he sang, "The Prayer of G", which was used as the ending theme song for the television drama Hattori Hanzō: Kage no Gundan which starred Sonny Chiba.

In the middle of the 1980s, having been dropped from the major record labels, he started the Bare Knuckle Review tour where he traveled all around Japan, in accompaniment with a guitar and a harmonica, singing in his former folk style. From this period on, he started singing songs that he was known for in his earlier days. Furthermore, during the same time he took on a Japanese folksong inspired rhythm, and created a unique genre he called "enyatotto". When searching for a new sound for this genre, he was enlightened when he first heard a Korean samul nori group. In 1987 he self-released an independent album called Enyatotto de Dancing!!. After this, he signed to Eastworld and released the albums Bare Knuckle Music (1990), Nobuyasu (1991), and Made in Japan (1992). The album Kaze Uta followed in 1998 on Nippon Crown.

Because he heard that the "Old fans weren't that happy", even though he was still in his "enyatotto-stage", on October 20, 2007, he performed at the first Off-Season Flowering Live Concert in 36 years. In 2010, Toshiba EMI release Okabayashi's cover song of Misora's "Requiem – The Heart of Misora Hibari". He self-released "Sayonara Hitotsu", his first new song in 14 years, in 2014.

23 years after his last studio album, Okabayashi released Fukkatsu no Asa on the Fuji record label.

== Discography ==
=== Studio albums ===
- Watashi wo Danzai Seyo (わたしを断罪せよ; 1969)
- Miru Mae ni Tobe (見るまえに跳べ; 1970)
- Orera Ichi Nuketa (俺ら いちぬけた; 1971)
- Kin'iro no Lion (金色のライオン; 1973)
- Dare zo Kono-ko ni Ai no Te o (誰ぞこの子に愛の手を; 1975)
- Utsushi-e (うつし絵; 1975)
- Love Songs (ラブソングス; 1977)
- Serenade (セレナーデ; 1978)
- Machi wa Sutekina Carnival (街はステキなカーニバル; 1979)
- Storm (ストーム; 1980)
- Graffiti (1981)
- Enyatotto de Dancing!! (エンヤトットでDancing!!; 1987)
- Bare Knuckle Music (ベア・ナックル・ミュージック; 1990)
- Nobuyasu (信康; 1991)
- Made in Japan (メイド・イン・ジャパン; 1992)
- Kaze Uta (風詩; 1998)
- Fukkatsu no Asa (復活の朝; 2021)
