= Firm Roots (Cedar Walton album) =

Live album by Cedar Walton
- Released: 1976
- Recorded: April 1974; Saratoga Room, Rochester, New York
- Genre: Jazz
- Length: 47:25
- Label: Muse; MR 5059
- Producer: Cedar Walton

Cedar Walton chronology
A Night At Boomers, Vol. 2 (1973)	Firm Roots (1976)	Pit Inn (1974)

Professional ratings
Review scores
Source	Rating
Allmusic	4/5 stars

Firm Roots is a live album by pianist Cedar Walton, recorded in 1974 and released on the Muse label in 1976.

== Reception ==
Allmusic awarded the album 4 stars.

== Track listing ==
All compositions by Cedar Walton except as indicated

1. "Firm Roots" – 7:24
2. "Shoulders" – 7:16
3. "One for Amos" (Sam Jones) – 6:47
4. "You Are the Sunshine of My Life" (Stevie Wonder) – 6:58
5. "I'm Not So Sure" – 7:53
6. "Voices Deep Within Me" – 8:34

== Personnel ==
- Cedar Walton – piano, electric piano
- Sam Jones – bass
- Louis Hayes – drums
