= Yōsuke Yamashita =

Japanese jazz pianist, composer and writer

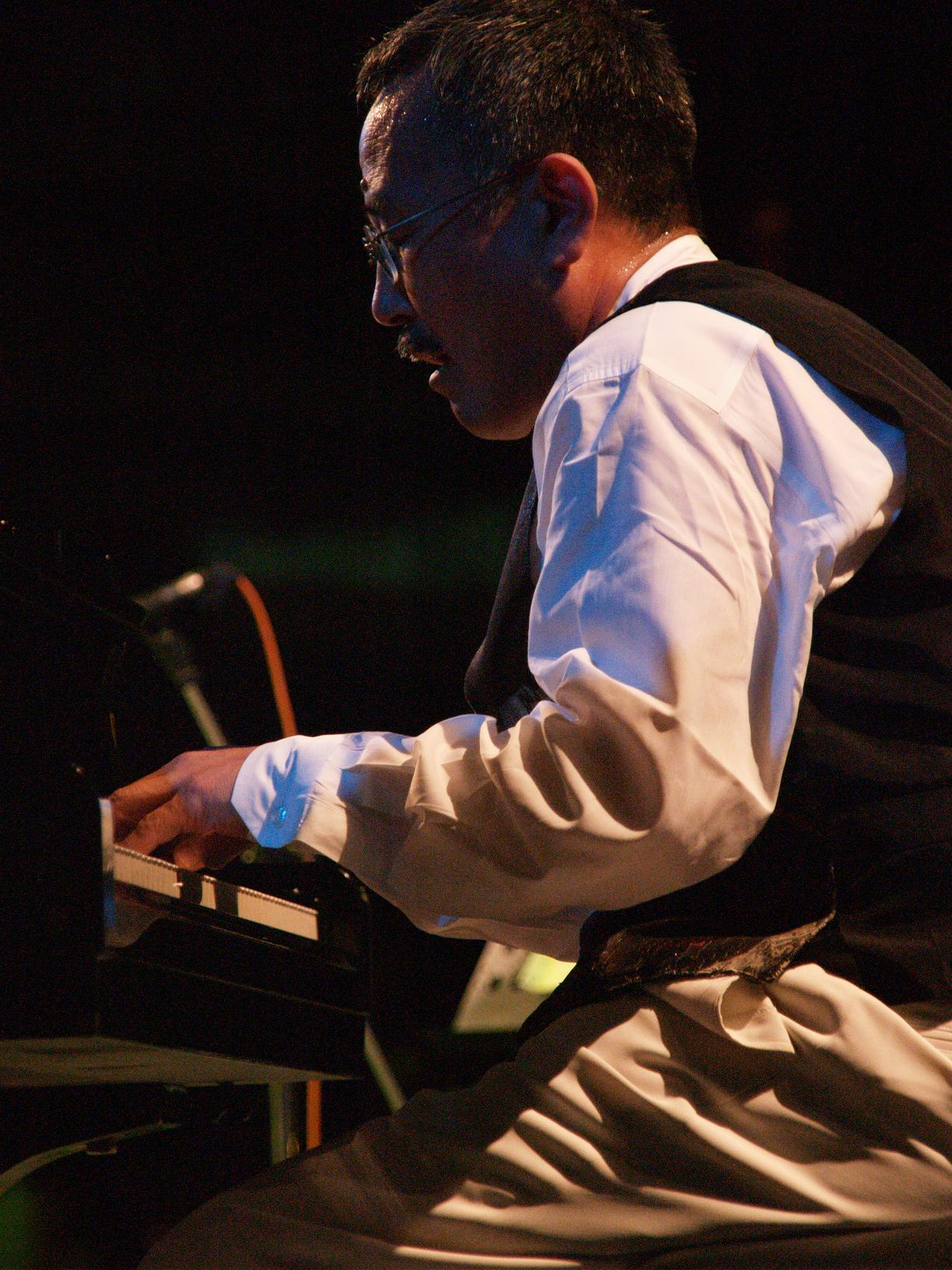
- Yōsuke Yamashita in 2006.

Background information
- Born: 26 February 1942 (age 84); Tokyo, Japan
- Genres: Jazz
- Occupations: Musician, composer, arranger, writer
- Instrument: Piano
- Labels: Enja Records, West 54 Records, Verve Records
- Website: jamrice.co.jp

Yōsuke Yamashita (山下 洋輔, Yamashita Yōsuke; born 26 February 1942) is a Japanese jazz pianist, composer and writer. His piano style is influenced by free jazz, modal jazz and soul jazz.

Since the late 1980s, Yamashita's main performing group has consisted of Cecil McBee (bass), Pheeroan akLaff (drums), and often Joe Lovano (saxophone).

== Early life ==
Yamashita was born in Tokyo, Japan, on 26 February 1942. He had violin lessons between the ages of nine and 15, and switched to piano in his teens.

== Later life and career ==
Yamashita first played piano professionally in 1959, at the age of 17, and attended the Kunitachi College of Music and studied classical composition from 1962 to 1967. In the early 1960s, he "was part of a group, with Terumasa Hino and Masabumi Kikuchi, that met at a jazz club called Ginparis (銀巴里) to play and discuss jazz every night". Yamashita's first released recording was in 1963, and he became a pioneer of avant-garde and free jazz. He was part of Masahiko Togashi's free jazz quartet in 1965, but it disbanded after three months without recording. The pair were part of Sadao Watanabe's band in 1966, but Yamashita and Togashi disagreed about rhythms, leading to the pianist leaving. He formed his own trio in August 1966, with bassist Satoshi Shigami and drummer Shigenori Honjo; around ten months later, they were replaced by Motoharu Yoshizawa and Yoshisaburo Toyozumi, respectively. Saxophonist Seiichi Nakamura was added a short time later. The quartet recorded for the film Inflatable Sex Doll of the Wastelands in 1967. Near the end of that year, Yamashita developed pleurisy, which meant that he was not musically active for almost a year.

In 1969, he formed the Yosuke Yamashita Trio. In 1974, the trio of Yamashita, Akira Sakata (alto sax) and Takeo Moriyama (drums) went on the first of a series of successful European tours, which helped spread beyond Japan Yamashita's and the trio's reputation as driving, fully committed free jazz musicians. The trio broke up in 1983.

In the 1980s, Yamashita formed his New York Trio with bassist Cecil McBee and drummer Pheeroan akLaff. In 1994, he was invited to perform at the 50th anniversary concert of jazz label Verve, held at Carnegie Hall. He provided the music for the film Dr. Akagi. He has also led a big band "that combined swing music with free jazz". He has been a visiting professor of music at Senzoku Gakuen College of Music, Nagoya University of Arts, and his alma mater, Kunitachi College of Music, in addition to publishing work on improvisation and music.

Yamashita performed on a burning piano in 1973 when asked by Japanese graphic designer Kiyoshi Awazu to be the subject in his short film, burning piano. Thirty-five years later, clothed in a protective firefighter's uniform, Yamashita repeated the performance on a beach in western Japan, playing jazz improvisations on a piano which had been set alight.

Yamashita is in charge of visiting professor of Jazz course in Kunitachi College of Music since 2010.

== Legacy ==
Critic Marc Moses, writing for The Japan Times in 1990, commented that "It is not an exaggeration to say that Yamashita is probably more responsible than any other individual for broadening the horizon of the creative Japanese jazz scene."

== Awards ==
- In 1990, he was awarded the Fumio Nanri award.
- In 1999, at the Mainichi Film Concours he was awarded "Best Film Score" for Dr. Akagi.
- In 2003, he was awarded the Medal of Honor by the Japanese government (紫綬褒章; しじゅほうしょう) for his contributions to the arts and academia.

== Discography ==
=== Jazz albums ===
==== As leader/co-leader ====
- Dancing Kojiki (Dancing 古事記) (self released, 1969) – the first live recording at Waseda University with Seiichi Nakamura and Takeo Moriyama
- Concert in New Jazz (Teichiku/Union Jazz, 1969) - the first professional live recording with Seiichi Nakamura and Takeo Moriyama
- Mina's Second Theme (Victor, 1969) – studio, trio with Seiichi Nakamura and Takeo Moriyama
- Mokujiki (木喰) (Victor, 1970) – studio, trio with Seiichi Nakamura and Takeo Moriyama
- April Fool: Coming Muhammad Ali (URC, 1972) – studio, trio with Seiichi Nakamura and Takeo Moriyama
- with Masahiko Sato, Piano Duo (Columbia, 1974) – live at Asahi Seimei Hall,
- Clay (Enja, 1974) – studio, trio with Akira Sakata, Takeo Moriyama
- Yosuke Alone (Bellwood, 1974) – solo
- with Manfred Schoof, Akira Sakata, Takeo Moriyama, Distant Thunder (Enja, 1975) – live
- Breathtake (Frasco, 1975) – solo
- Chiasma (MPS, 1976) – with Akira Sakata, Takeo Moriyama, recorded in 1975
- Banslikana (Enja, 1976) – solo, recorded in 1975
- with Yasutaka Tsutsui, Ie (家) (Frasco, 1976) – recorded in 1975–76
- A day in Music (Frasco, 1976) – duo with Adelhard Roidinger
- Montreux Afterglow (Frasco, 1976) – trio live at Montreux Jazz Festival
- Arashi (嵐) (Frasco, 1976) – with Gerald Oshita, Dairakudakan
- Umbrella Dance'' (Frasco, 1977)
- with Adelhard Roidinger, Inner Space (Enja, 1977)
- Wave Song (Frasco, 1977) – with Adelhard Roidinger
- with Yasutaka Tsutsui, Yasutaka Tsutsui - Bunmei (筒井康隆文明) (Victor/Super Fuji Discs, 1978)
- Sunayama (砂山) (Frasco, 1978?)
- Invitation – Yosuke In The Gallery (Frasco, 1979)
- First Time (Frasco, 1979)
- with Haruna Miyake, Exchange (Victor, 1979)
- Jugemu – A Figure of Yosuke Yamashita (寿限無 – A Figure of Yosuke Yamashita) Vol. 1 and Vol.2 (Frasco, 1981)
- Picasso - Live, And Then... (Columbia, 1983) - recorded in 1982. CD reissue in 2015.
- Washinopanjya!! (わしのパンじゃ!!) (Columbia, 1983)
- It Don't Mean a Thing (DIW, 1984) – solo
- with Hozan Yamamoto, Masahiko Togashi, Breath (Denon, 1984)
- It Don't Mean A Thing (DIW, 1984)
- with Ruri Shimada, Goji Hamada, V.A., Winter Music (Locus Solus, 1985)
- Sentimental (Kitty, 1985)
- with Mal Waldron, Piano Duo Live At Pit Inn (CBS/Sony, 1986)
- with Kodō, In Live (Denon, 1986)
- Rhapsody in Blue (Kitty, 1986)
- with Hozan Yamamoto, Bolero (Enja, 1986)
- Plays Gershwin (Kitty, 1989)
- Crescendo - Live At Sweet Basil (Kitty, 1989)
- Sakura (Verve, 1990) – with Cecil McBee and Pheeroan Aklaff
- Sakura Live (Verve, 1991) – with Cecil McBee and Pheeroan Aklaff
- Kurdish Dance (Verve, 1992) – with Cecil McBee and Pheeroan Aklaff
- Dazzling Days (Verve, 1993) – with Joe Lovano, Cecil McBee and Pheeroan Aklaff
- Asian Games (Verve Forecast, 1993) – with Bill Laswell and Ryuichi Sakamoto
- Playground (Verve, 1993)
- Ways of Time (Verve, 1994) – with Tim Berne, Joe Lovano, Cecil McBee and Pheeroan Aklaff
- Spider (Verve, 1996) – with Cecil McBee and Pheeroan Aklaff
- Canvas In Quiet - Homage To Morio Matsui (Verve, 1996)
- Stone Flower - Homage To A.C. Jobim (JVC, 1997)
- Duo Live in Warehouse with Eitetsu Hayashi (King/Raijin, 1998) - live in Tokyo
- Ballads For You (Trial, 1998) - live in Fuji, Shizuoka
- Golden Circle "6" (Trial, 1999) - live in Hamamatsu
- Fragments 1999 (Verve, 1999) – with Cecil McBee and Pheeroan Aklaff
- Resonant Memories (Verve, 2001) – solo. recorded in 2000.
- Graceful Illusion (Universal Music, 2004)
- Delightful Contrast (Universal, 2011) – with Cecil McBee and Pheeroan Aklaff
- Yamashita, Yosuke Trio (DIW, 2012) - recorded in 1973
- Grandioso (Universal, 2013) – with Cecil McBee and Pheeroan Aklaff
- Bolero / Pictures at an Exhibition (ボレロ/展覧会の絵) (JamRice, 2014) – with special bigband
- Yosuke Yamashita x Dairo Suga (山下洋輔 x スガダイロー) (Velvet Sun, 2014) – with Dairo Suga
- From The New World (新世界より) (JamRice, 2015) - with special bigband
- In Europe 1983 -complete edition- (Columbia, 2015) - recorded in Germany 1983
- 30 Light -years Floating (30光年の浮遊) with Cecil McBee and Pheeroan Aklaff (Verve, 2018)

As chamber ensemble “Hakkozan (八向山)”
(with Shigeharu Mukai and Yahiro Tomohiro)

- Hakkozan (八向山) (Zizo, 2002)

==== Other appearances ====
As sideman

- Masahiko Togashi & Masayuki Takayanagi, Ginparis Session (銀巴里セッション) (TBM, 1972) - the first recording in 1963
- Isso Yukihiro, It's So Isso (東京ダルマガエル) (King, 1990)
- Kodō (鼓童), Gathering (Sony, 1991) - live
- Nobuyasu Okabayashi, Made in Japan (Toshiba EMI, 1992)
- Magokoro brothers, Zeni-no-Daisansya (善意の第三者) (Sony/"Ki/oon", 1992)
- Kim Dae-hwan, Black Roots (nices, 1993) - live in Seoul, recorded in 1991
- Sachi Hayasaka & Stir Up! 2.26 (Enja, 1994) - live, recorded in 1992
- Kazumi Watanabe, Oyatsu (おやつ) (Universal/domo, 1994)
- Shuichi Murakami, Welcome to My Life (Victor, 1998)
- Black Out (Jazz), 1999/2.26 Live (Nbagi, 1999)
- Yuki Maeda, Jazz Age: Gershwin Song Book (ewe, 1999)
- T-Square (band), plays T&The Square Special (虹曲) (SMA, 2012)
- Toshi Ichiyanagi, Piano Concerto No.4 "Jazz", Piano Concerto No.5 "Finland", Concerto for Marimba and Orchestra (Camerata Tokyo, 2013)
- Saki Takaoka, Sings - Bedtime Stories (Victor, 2014)
- Bennie Wallace, Brilliant Corners (Denon, 2015) - recorded in 1986
- Nobuyasu Okabayashi, Requiem – The Heart of Misora Hibari (EMI Music Japan, 2010)
- Nao Takeuchi, Obsidian (What's New, 2010)
- Shinnosuke Takahashi, Blues 4 Us - Live at Shinjyuku Pit Inn (Pit Inn, 2011)
- Akira Horikoshi & Akihito Obama, Lotus Position (Waternet Sound, 2016)
- Asako Motojima, Melodies of Memories (Greenfin, 2017)
- Nobuyasu Okabayashi,Shinta Juni Show (森羅十二象) (DIW, 2018)

Omnibus Albums

- Jazz in Tokyo '69 (Tact, 1969)
- Memories of Bill Evans (Victor, 1999)
- Gets Gilberto + 50 (verve, 2013)

=== Soundtrack ===
- Dixieland Daimyo (ジャズ大名サウンド図鑑, Jazz Daimyo Sound Revue) (Tokuma Japan, 1986; re-issue 2002)
- Dr. Kanzo Original Soundtrack / Yosuke Yamashita on Cinema (Verve, 1998)
- Vengeance for Sale Original Soundtrack (Vap, 2002)
- 天使の恍惚 (Ecstasy of the Angels) Soundtrack (Ultra-Vybe, 2008) - recorded in 1972
- Shirō Sagisu, Evangelion PianoForte 1 (King, 2013)
- 西郷どん オリジナル・サウンドトラック THE BEST (Segodon Original Soundtrack The Best) (Avex Classics, 2018) - with Minami Kizuki(vo)
- 西郷どん オリジナル・サウンドトラックII (Segodon Original Soundtrack II) (Avex Classics, 2018) - with Minami Kizuki(vo)

=== Selective classical compositions ===
- "Yōsuke Yamashita: Piano Concerto No.1 ENCOUNTER for Improviser"
  - in Yōsuke Yamashita, Yutaka Sado and RAI National Symphony Orchestra Yōsuke Yamashita: Piano Concerto No.1 ENCOUNTER (Avex Classics, 2007)
  - and Yōsuke Yamashita, Yutaka Sado and Siena Wind Orchestra Rhapsody in Blue (Avex Classics, 2014)
- "Yōsuke Yamashita: Piano Concerto No.3 EXPLORER" in Yōsuke Yamashita, Yutaka Sado Explorer×Sudden Fiction (Avex Classics, 2008) - with Tokyo Philharmonic Orchestra
