= Trost Records =

Record label located in Vienna

- Founded: 1991
- Genre: Various
- Country of origin: Austria
- Location: Vienna
- Official website: www.trost.at

Trost Records is a record label located in Vienna.

== History ==
In the early 1990s, Trost was founded as a tape label, releasing records of Austrian alternative and underground bands, such as Valina, Snakkerdu Densk, Bulbul and Holly May.

In 2011, the sublabel Cien Fuegos was established which primarily releases free jazz re-issues. Moreover, Trost started to closely cooperate with artists like Peter Brötzmann, Christof Kurzmann, Mats Gustafsson, Alexander von Schlippenbach.

In 2013, Trost released the five-CD set Long Story Short, featuring recordings from the Wels Unlimited festival held in Austria in November 2011, to celebrate the birthday of Peter Brötzmann. In addition to Brötzmann, the release features the music of Okkyung Lee, Nasheet Waits, Jason Adasiewicz, Keiji Haino, and Dieb13. The release was awarded the Preis der deutschen Schallplattenkritik.

Recently, Trost Records has been collaborating with the Scandinavian free jazz band The Thing (the thing records), the Viennese band Radian (Radian Releases) and the Viennese record label Comfortzone.

== Artists ==
- Valina
- Peter Brötzmann
- DKV Trio
- Fake the Facts
- Full Blast
- Christof Kurzmann
- Made to Break
- nohome (Caspar Brötzmann)
- Akira Sakata/Johan Berthling/Paal Nilssen-Love
- Schlippenbach Trio - Alexander von Schlippenbach, Paul Lovens, Evan Parker
- monochrom
- Sonore
- Steamboat Switzerland
- The Sun Ra Arkestra
- Boneshaker - Mars Williams, Paal Nilssen-Love, Kent Kessler
- Zu
- Bulbul
- Holly May (Lonely Drifter Karen)
- TV Buddhas
- Snakkerdu Densk
- The Paper Chase
- 16-17
