= The Thing (band) =

Norwegian/Swedish jazz trio

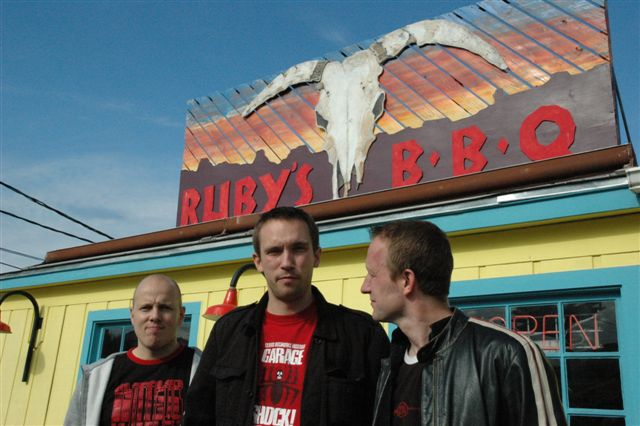
- The Thing in Austin, Texas, November 18, 2005

Background information
- Origin: Stockholm, Sweden
- Genres: Free jazz, jazz
- Years active: 2000–present
- Labels: Crazy Wisdom/Universal, Smalltown Superjazzz, The Thing
- Members: Mats Gustafsson; Ingebrigt Håker Flaten; Paal Nilssen-Love

The Thing are a Norwegian/Swedish jazz trio, consisting of Mats Gustafsson (saxophones), Ingebrigt Håker Flaten (double bass), and Paal Nilssen-Love (drums).

== Name ==
The Thing took their name from a track on Don Cherry's 1966 album Where Is Brooklyn?

== Performances and recordings ==
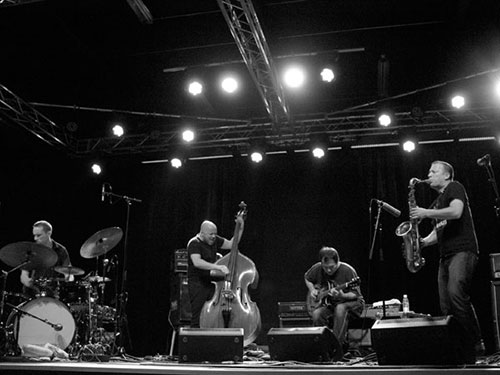
The Thing, featuring Otomo Yoshihide (guitar) (2010)

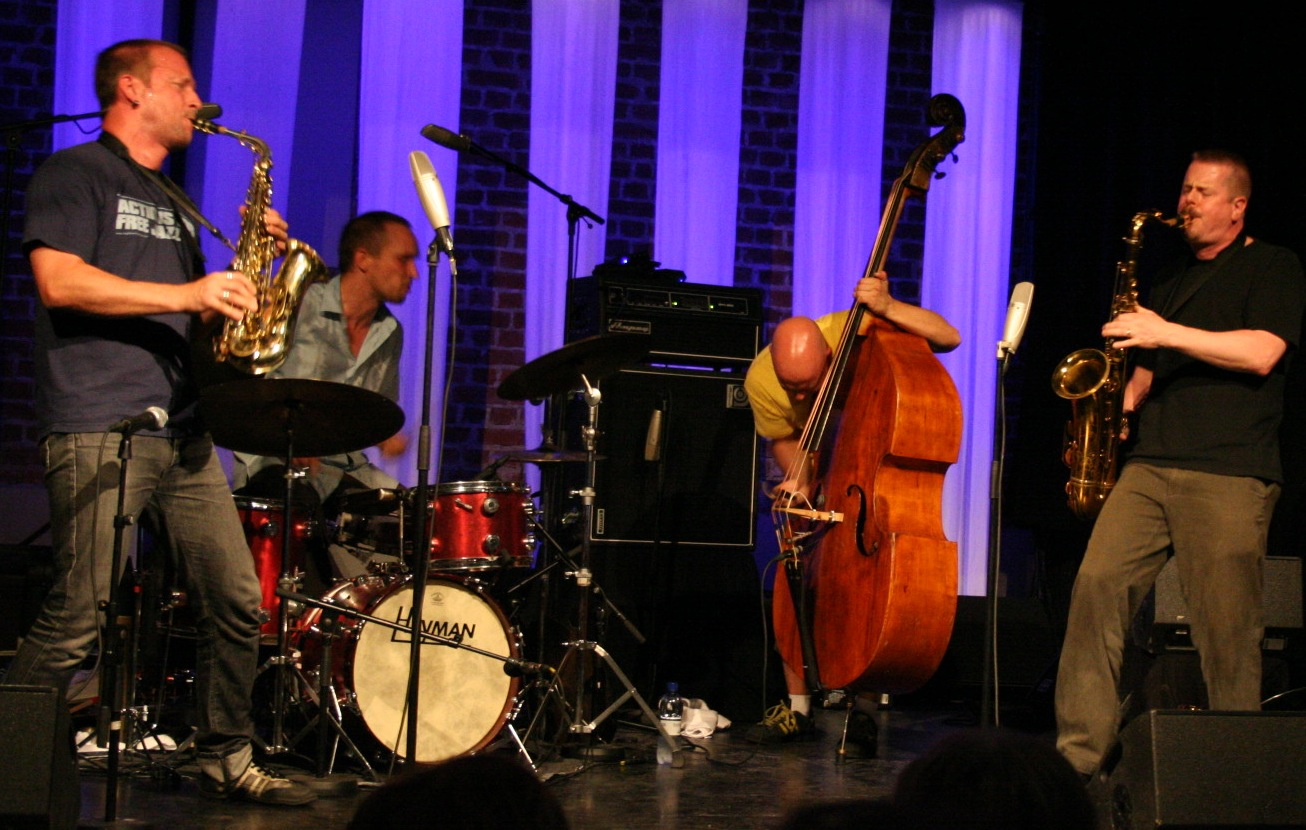
The Thing with Ken Vandermark (far right) at Kongsberg Jazzfestival (2008)

The Thing were established in February 2000 to play a series of concerts in Stockholm and a recording of Don Cherry compositions that was released in Sweden by the label Crazy Wisdom/Universal. Melding German, British and American traditions of free music, their repertoire has later been collected from various sources such as James Blood Ulmer, Frank Lowe, PJ Harvey, White Stripes and Joe McPhee. McPhee was also a participating musician on the She Knows... album (2001). Other guests who have joined The Thing for recording and performances include Ken Vandermark, Otomo Yoshihide, Thurston Moore, Jim O'Rourke and Jeb Bishop.

Garage was released on the Smalltown Superjazzz label in 2004. An EP of live material performed with Joe McPhee and Cato Salsa Experience was released in 2005, as well as a live album. 2006 saw the release of Action Jazz, also on Smalltown Superjazz. The group cover material from Ornette Coleman, Lightning Bolt, Yosuke Yamashita and others in addition to original material. The group are the only free jazz ensemble working today who wear stage uniforms. They perform clad in t-shirts from Ruby's Barbecue Restaurant in Austin, Texas.

In June 2012 they released the album The Cherry Thing, a collaboration with Swedish-British singer Neneh Cherry. The album was Cherry's first album as a named leader for 16 years.

== Discography ==
=== The Thing ===
- The Thing (2000)
- She Knows... (with Joe McPhee) (2001)
- Garage (2004)
- Live at Blå (2005)
- Action Jazz (2006)
- Immediate Sound (with Ken Vandermark) (2007)
- Now and Forever (box set containing The Thing, She Knows..., a new improv session Gluttony and a live DVD Live at Øya 2005 w/ Thurston Moore) (2007)
- Bag It! (2009)
- Mono (2011)
- Metal! (with Barry Guy) (2012)
- Boot! (2013)
- Live (with Thurston Moore) (2014)
- Shake (2015)
- Baby Talk (with James Blood Ulmer, 2017)
- Again (2018)

=== The Thing with Cato Salsa Experience and Joe McPhee ===
- Sounds Like a Sandwich (2005)
- Two Bands and a Legend (2007)
- I See You Baby (2007) (EP)

=== The Thing with Otomo Yoshihide ===
- Shinjuku Crawl (2009)

=== The Thing with Jim O'Rourke ===
- Shinjuku Growl (2010)

=== Neneh Cherry & The Thing ===
- The Cherry Thing (2012)
- The Cherry Thing Remixes (2012)
