= Smalltown Superjazzz =

Norwegian record label

Smalltown Superjazzz is an independent record label based in Oslo, Norway, that concentrates on new forms of jazz. It is a subsidiary of the label Smalltown Supersound.

The catalog includes albums by Free Fall, Mats Gustafsson, The Thing

== See also ==
- List of record labels
