= Ingebrigt Håker Flaten =

Norwegian bassist (born 1971)

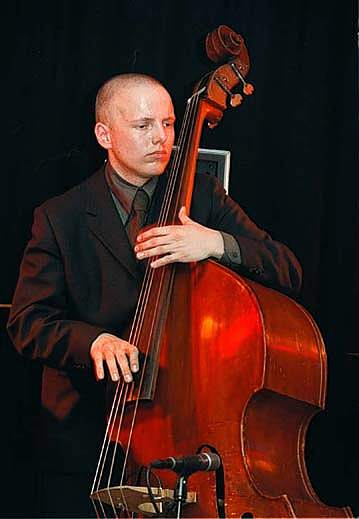
- Ingebrigt Håker Flaten

Background information
- Born: 23 September 1971 (age 55); Oppdal Municipality, Sør-Trøndelag, Norway
- Origin: Norway
- Genre: Jazz
- Occupations: Musician and composer
- Instrument: Upright bass
- Website: Official website

Ingebrigt Håker Flaten (born 23 September 1971 in Oppdal Municipality, Norway) is a Norwegian bassist active in the jazz and free jazz genres.

== Career ==
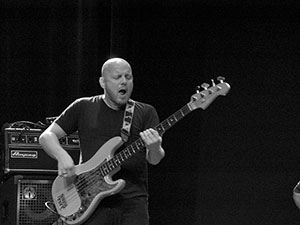
Ingebrigt Håker Flaten

Flaten played electric bass in local funk trio Neon (1990), and studied on the Jazz program at Trondheim Music Conservatory (1992–94). He was involved in several groups from the first year at NTNU, including Trondhjems Kunstorkester, To Brumbasser og en Bi, and the successful group The Source. With the latter Ornette Coleman–inspired band he recorded records Olemanns kornett (1994) and ... of Christmas (1995), toured in northern Europe and had festival gigs with such different combos as Motor Psycho and Cikada Quartet (both in 1995). Already in 1993 he was part of jamkompet at Kongsberg Jazz Festival.

To Brumbasser og en Bi was later better known as the Maria Kannegaard Trio. From 1994 he had a duo with Michael Bloch, and became a member of Jax from the same year, including festival gigs in Oslo and Moldejazz. He appeared on Bugge Wesseltoft's album New Conception of Jazz (1995–96), and from 1995 he was a member of two successful groups, one of them the Paul Bley–inspired trio Close Erase, with recordings in 1995, 1998, 2001, and 2006. He also appeared on tours and festivals, as well as re-release 2010, "R.I.P. Complete Recordings 1995–2007", and the Coltrane-inspired quartet Element.

In the winter of 1995–96 Flaten moved to Oslo and this led to many new involvements, like Acidband, SAN: Song (1996), Oslo Groove Company, YoungLove, and the super trio with Petter Wettre (1996–), usually just called The Trio: Meet the locals (1998), In color (1999) and Mystery unfolds (2001), and Tour de force with Petter Wettre/Dave Liebman (2000). Moreover, he has played bass on records with Sigurd Køhn (1996), Eivind Aarset (1997), Jazzmob (1998), Bugge Wesseltoft's Sharing (1998), Moving (2001) and Live (2000–02), Didrik Ingvaldsen (2000), two albums with the band School Days (2000 and 2001), seven albums with The Thing, a trio with Mats Gustafsson and Paal Nilssen-Love (2001), Live at Blå (2003), Action jazz (2005), Now and forever (2005), Immediate sound with Ken Vandermark (2007) and Bag it! (2008), No Spaghetti Edition (2001) and og Atomic: Feet music (2001), Boom Boom (2002), The Bikini tapes (2004), Happy new ears! (2005), Retrograde (2007–08) and Theater Tilters, vol 1–2 (2010).

Other recordings include The Electrics (2002) and The Scorch Trio (with Raoul Björkenheim og Paal Nilssen-Love) 2002 og 2004, Brolt! (2008) and Melaza (2010). In 2003 he released his solo album Double bass, and the same year he participated on the record Bjørn Johansen in memoriam and the fusion of Atomic and Schooldays released in the album Nuclear assembly hall, followed by Distil (Chicago 2006). A record with Bugge Wesseltoft, New Conception of Jazz, was released in 2004, the same year he was awarded Vitalprisen at Kongsberg Jazzfestival. In 2011 he released the record My heart always wanders, which he did with Håkon Kornstad and Jon Christensen. In the same year he contributed to Ola Kvernberg's record Liarbird, receiving Spellemannprisen 2011.

Flaten runs the annual Sonic Transmissions Festival, a festival in Austin, Texas devoted to hybrid free-jazz forms.

== Honors ==
- 2004: Kongsberg Jazz Award

== Selected projects ==
- Atomic
- Element
- The Thing
- Scorch Trio
- Ingebrigt Håker Flaten Quintet

== Major collaborators ==
- Ken Vandermark
- Joe McPhee
- Paal Nilssen-Love
- Bugge Wesseltoft
- Håvard Wiik
- Ola Kvernberg

== Discography ==
Solo albums

- 2003: Double Bass (Sofa)
- 2012: Birds - Solo Electric (Tektite Records Co.Operative)
- 2012: Steel - Live In Bucharest (Tektite Records Co.Operative)

With Ingebrigt Håker Flaten Quintet

- 2006: Quintet (Jazzland Rec/Universal)
- 2008: The Year Of The Boar (Jazzland Rec/Universal)

Awards
Preceded by Live Maria Roggen	Recipient of the Kongsberg Jazz Award; 2004	Succeeded by Solveig Slettahjell
