= Paal Nilssen-Love =

Norwegian jazz drummer and composer

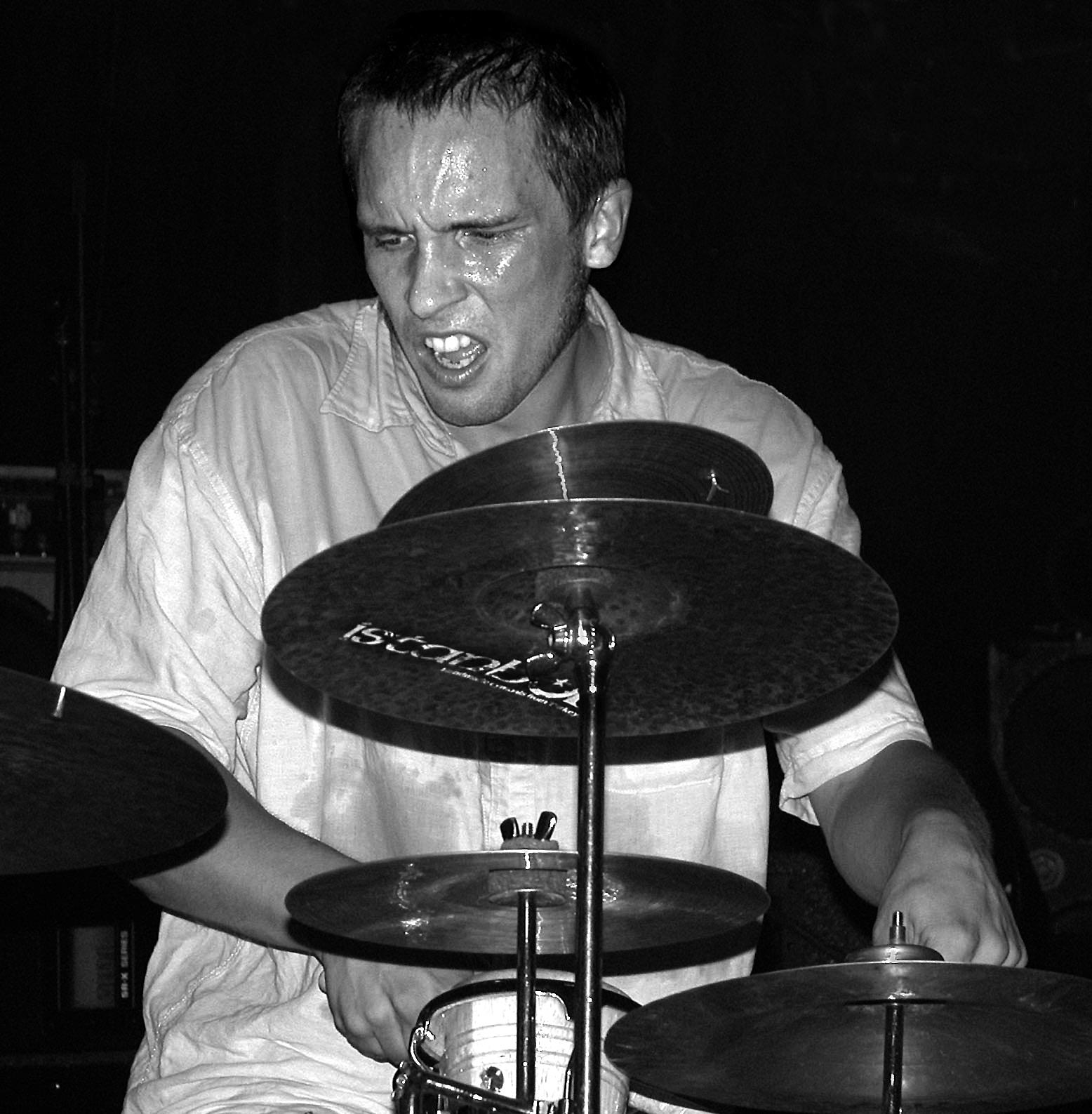
- At the Empty Bottle, Chicago, 24 September 2006

Background information
- Born: 24 December 1974 (age 50); Molde, Møre og Romsdal, Norway
- Genres: Jazz, Free jazz, Free improvisation
- Occupation(s): Musician, composer
- Instrument: Drums
- Website: www.paalnilssen-love.com

Paal Nilssen-Love (born 24 December 1974) is a Norwegian drummer and composer in the jazz, free jazz and free improvisation genres.

== Early life ==
Nilssen-Love was born in Molde, Norway. His parents ran a jazz club in Stavanger, and he learned to play drums on the kit owned by his father. As a teenager, he played with free-jazz reedsman Frode Gjerstad, which was the start of a long musical relationship. He did musical studies at Sund folkehøgskole 1993-94. In 1994, during studies on the Jazz program at the Trondheim Musikkonservatorium (1994–96), he formed the band Element which musically became a platform for several other groups with bassist Ingebrigt Håker Flaten and pianist Håvard Wiik and led to collaborations with Iain Ballamy and Chris Potter. Nilssen-Love also did a little composing in the mid-1990s.

== Later life and career ==
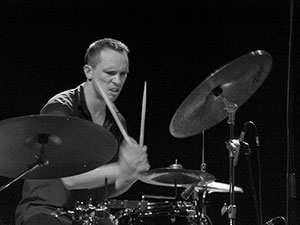
Paal Nilssen-Love

Relocating to Oslo in 1996, Nilssen-Love took part in the forming of bands such as Håkon Kornstad Trio, The Quintet and Frode Gjerstad Trio, as well as self-initiated projects. In 1999, Nilssen-Love played his first solo concert.

Continuing, "by the early 2000s, Nilssen-Love had launched an international career, playing alongside Swedish saxophonist Mats Gustafsson and American reed player Ken Vandermark, among others." He has worked with his trio Vandermark and Ab Baars, the bands Large Unit (a big band, with about 14 members, which he has led and composed for since 2013), School Days, The Thing, Scorch Trio, Territory Band, FME, and various duo projects such as with reedmen Peter Brötzmann and Vandermark guitarist Terrie Hessels (The Ex), saxophonist John Butcher, organist Nils Henrik Asheim, and noise experimentalist Lasse Marhaug.

In 2014, Nilssen-Love decided to leave the band Atomic to concentrate on Large Unit and projects involving more improvising.

== Awards ==
- 2002: Kongsberg Jazz Award, within Håkon Kornstad Trio
- 2006: Buddyprisen

== Discography ==
=== Solo drum recordings ===
- 2001: Sticks & Stones (Sofa)
- 2005: 27 Years Later (Utech)
- 2010: Miró (PNL)
- 2012: Chiapaneca (Bocian)
- 2015: News from the Junk Yard (PNL)

Awards
Preceded by Christian Wallumrød	Recipient of the Kongsberg Jazz Award; 2002	Succeeded by Live Maria Roggen
Preceded by Arve Henriksen	Recipient of the Buddyprisen; 2006	Succeeded by Jon Larsen
