= Hyperglyph =

Studio album by Chicago Underground Duo
- Released: August 15, 2025
- Recorded: May 6–9, 2024; September 25–27, 2024
- Studio: International Anthem (Chicago)
- Genre: Jazz
- Length: 41:51
- Label: International Anthem

Chicago Underground Duo chronology
Locus (2014)	Hyperglyph (2025)

Hyperglyph is a studio album by Chicago Underground Duo, an American duo of Rob Mazurek and Chad Taylor. It was released on August 15, 2025, through International Anthem Recording Company. It received universal acclaim from critics.

== Background ==
Chicago Underground Duo consists of American musicians Rob Mazurek and Chad Taylor. Hyperglyph is the duo's first album since Locus (2014). It was released on August 15, 2025, through International Anthem Recording Company. A music video was released for the album's title track.

== Critical reception ==
Professional ratings
Aggregate scores
Source	Rating
Metacritic	81/100
Review scores
Source	Rating
AllMusic	4/5 stars
Mojo	4/5 stars
Uncut	7/10

According to the review aggregator Metacritic, Hyperglyph received "universal acclaim" based on a weighted average score of 81 out of 100 from 5 critic scores.

Andy Cowan of Mojo wrote, "With tense atmospherics pulsing just below the surface, an electric chemistry courses through the line-blurring electro-acoustic hybrids of Hyperglyph." Hank Shteamer of The New York Times stated, "they reassert their folk-rooted futurism, setting free-form trumpet-drums duets alongside pulsing electroacoustic grooves and blissful thumb-piano interludes, imbuing it all with surreal wonder." Thom Jurek of AllMusic commented that "This set reveals their mature, fully developed musical language expanded by sonic and harmonic invention."

=== Accolades ===
Year-end lists for Hyperglyph
Publication	List	Rank	Ref.
AllMusic	Favorite Jazz Albums	—	
The New York Times	Best Jazz Albums of 2025	8	
The Quietus	The Quietus Albums of the Year 2025	42	

== Track listing ==
All tracks are written by Rob Mazurek and Chad Taylor, except "Plymouth" and "Hemiunu" by Taylor.

Hyperglyph track listing
No.	Title	Length
1.	"Click Song"	3:02
2.	"Hyperglyph"	4:51
3.	"Rhythm Cloth"	1:14
4.	"Contents of Your Heavenly Body"	2:40
5.	"The Gathering"	7:06
6.	"Plymouth"	1:42
7.	"Hemiunu"	5:08
8.	"Egyptian Suite / Part 1: The Architect"	3:42
9.	"Egyptian Suite / Part 2: Triangulation of Light"	5:19
10.	"Egyptian Suite / Part 3: Architectronics of Time"	3:41
11.	"Succulent Amber"	3:26
Total length:		41:51

== Personnel ==
Credits adapted from liner notes.

- Rob Mazurek – trumpet, piccolo trumpet, RMI electric piano, modular synthesizer, sampler, voice, flute, bell
- Chad Taylor – drum kit, percussion, mbira, kalimba
- Dave Vettraino – engineering, mixing
- Scott McNiece – sequencing
- David Allen – mastering
- Mikel Patrick Avery – front cover photography
- Alejandro Ayala – back cover photography
- Aaron Lowell Denton – design

== Charts ==
Chart performance for Hyperglyph
Chart (2025)	Peak position
UK Album Downloads (OCC)	59
