= Titration (album) =

2003 studio album by Active Ingredients

Studio album by Active Ingredients (Chad Taylor, Jemeel Moondoc, Steve Swell, Tom Abbs)
- Released: 2003
- Recorded: July 5 and 6, 2002
- Genre: Free improvisation
- Length: 1:05:28
- Label: Delmark; DG-547
- Producer: Ken Brown, Chad Taylor, Jemeel Moondoc, Steve Krasinsky, Steve Swell, Tom Abbs

Chad Taylor chronology
Titration (2003)	Circle Down (2009)

Titration is the debut album by the free improvisation ensemble Active Ingredients. Led by drummer Chad Taylor, it features alto saxophonist Jemeel Moondoc, trombonist Steve Swell, and double bassist Tom Abbs, as well as guest artists Rob Mazurek (cornet), David Boykin (tenor saxophone), and Avreeayl Ra (percussion). The album was recorded on July 5 and 6, 2002, and was released in 2003 by Delmark Records.

== Reception ==
Professional ratings
Review scores
Source	Rating
AllMusic	4/5 stars
Tom Hull – on the Web	B+

In a review for AllMusic, Thom Jurek called the album "a wildly adventurous date that swings across continents in its musical approach, from North America to Southern Africa, and regards both freewheeling improvisation and elegant composition equally." He wrote: "Titration is a brilliant articulation of balance, not only between two approaches to the jazz avant-garde, but also of the new composition that relies so heavily on free improv."

Rex Butters of All About Jazz stated that the recording "brings together four of the strongest players on the New York free scene," and commented: "Active Ingredients has turned in an impressive debut. Amidst the many projects to which these musicians contribute, hopefully this group will become a priority." AAJ's Derek Taylor wrote that the band name "echoes the galvanizing energy inherent in [the musicians'] association," and praised the group's "resistance to long-term convention and custom."

A writer for CMJ New Music Report noted Taylor's association with the Chicago Underground, and remarked: "Eschewing the Underground's penchant for electronics, Titration kicks up a rough-hewn and soulful avant-garde vibe that's acoustic and more conventionally Jazz, but just as far-reaching and ambitious as Taylor's more established outlet."

In an article for One Final Note, Jay Collins wrote: "This is an outstanding debut from a group of players that, both together in this collective or on their own, make exciting music. Taylor, in particular, makes a strong case for himself as a bandleader, composer and musician and thus, Titration is one of the strongest records of the year."

Ken Waxman of JazzWord called the album "an impressive achievement," and stated: "there are times on Titration's four quartet tracks that the combo sounds like an updated New York Art Quartet... one of the few drawbacks of the CD is that the tunes often seem as if they should be longer."

== Track listing ==
Tracks 3 and 6 were composed by Active Ingredients. Remaining tracks were composed by Chad Taylor.

1. "Song for Dyani" – 7:43
2. "Velocity" – 5:39
3. "Slate" – 4:24
4. "Visual Industries" – 8:16
5. "Modern Mythology" – 7:45
6. "Absence" – 3:42
7. "Titration" – 9:15
8. "Dependent Origination" – 4:53
9. "Other Peoples' Problems" – 13:51

== Personnel ==
- Chad Taylor – drums
- Jemeel Moondoc – alto saxophone
- Steve Swell – trombone
- Tom Abbs – double bass
- Rob Mazurek – cornet (tracks 3, 5, 6)
- David Boykin – tenor saxophone (tracks 3, 7)
- Avreeayl Ra – percussion (track 5)
