= Possible Cube =

Studio album by Chicago Underground Trio
- Released: March 30, 1999
- Recorded: May 1 & 2, 1998
- Studio: Riverside Studio, Chicago, IL
- Genre: Jazz
- Length: 63:36
- Label: Delmark; DE-511
- Producer: Steve Krasinsky, Rob Mazurek, Chad Taylor, Noel Kupersmith, Bundy K. Brown

Chicago Underground Trio chronology
Possible Cube (1999)	Flamethrower (1999)

Rob Mazurek chronology
12° of Freedom (1998)	Possible Cube (1999)	Utonian Automatic (1998)

Possible Cube is an album by Chicago Underground Trio which was recorded in 1999 and released on the Delmark label.

== Reception ==
Professional ratings
Review scores
Source	Rating
AllMusic	3/5 stars

In his review for AllMusic, Michael G. Nastos states: "the trio weaves in and out of improvisations and written passages quite effectively and holds a certain degree of interest if one pays close attention. ... This second recording from the Trio shows no lack of imagination or resolve, though the pure musical content might leave some creative music listeners wanting for the third, hopefully breakthrough effort that must come from these talented, challenged sonic explorers".

Adam Shatz of The New York Times wrote: "This graceful collage of free jazz and art rock has refreshingly little in common with the electric jazz of Miles Davis, whose ghost tends to hover over such experiments. Instead of looking to funk for inspiration, the trio delves into the ethereal textures of modern electronica. And the astonishing thing is that the record doesn't sound like an experiment. Where most jazz-rock fusions feel awkwardly hyphenated, this one is naturally hybrid."

The Wire included the album in their "1999 Rewind" listing the 50 best albums of the year.

== Track listing ==
All compositions by Rob Mazurek except where noted

1. "Othello" (Chad Taylor) – 8:58
2. "Shaw Town" (Mazurek, Taylor, Kupersmith) – 3:26
3. "O Balanco" – 1:09
4. "Nude Anthem" – 3:52
5. "The Enormous Room" – 4:20
6. "Pisces" (Taylor) – 3:21
7. "Into Another You" (Taylor, Kupersmith, Mazurek, Jeff Parker) – 14:21
8. "Pássaros" – 0:42
9. "O Sino" – 1:13
10. "LMNO" – 2:12
11. "Munir E Salete" – 1:48
12. "Teletransportation Unit 3" (Kupersmith, Mazurek, Parker) – 4:55
13. "Future Ancestors" (Taylor) – 5:17
14. "Energia" (Taylor, Kupersmith, Mazurek) – 1:45
15. "Arthur Na Igreja" – 0:36
16. "Leonardo" – 0:31
17. "La Jetée" (Parker) – 5:20

== Personnel ==
- Rob Mazurek – cornet, electronics, vibraphone, Vietnamese marimba, organ
- Noel Kupersmith – bass, vibraphone
- Chad Taylor – percussion, vibraphone
- Jeff Parker – acoustic guitar, organ (tracks 2, 7 & 12)
