= Silver Spines =

Studio album by Rob Mazurek
- Released: August 27, 2002
- Recorded: March 24 & 25, 2002
- Studio: Riverside Studio, Chicago, IL
- Genre: Jazz
- Length: 68:39
- Label: Delmark; DG-540
- Producer: Rob Mazurek, Casey Rice

Rob Mazurek chronology
Axis and Alignment (2002)	Silver Spines (2002)	Amorphic Winged (2002)

Silver Spines is a solo album by Rob Mazurek that was released on the Delmark label in 2002.

== Reception ==
Professional ratings
Review scores
Source	Rating
Allmusic	4/5 stars
The Penguin Guide to Jazz Recordings	3/4 stars

In his review for AllMusic, Thom Jurek states: "Working closely with engineer Casey Rice, Mazurek offers 18 compositions of elaborately layered melody, edgeless dissonance, found and electronic sound, manipulated in the studio and reshaped into small but gorgeous small universes of texture, lyricism, impression, and ghostly presences. ... In all, it's as experimental a record as there is, but it is hardly inaccessible. In fact, in most places, it is not only quite lovely to listen to, but full of humor as well. ... Silver Spines is nothing short of excellent".

On All About Jazz Mark F. Turner said: "As an improviser the overall concept works within the framework of the artist's vision, but the big picture may be elusive to listeners. Many of the selections would make great samples themselves for material that could be used in other film or sound recordings. The result, however, is a sound collage whose sum is no greater than its individual parts".

== Track listing ==
All compositions by Robert Mazurek except where noted

1. "Moving Through and Back Again (The Quietude of Moving Through You and Back Again)" − 6:51
2. "Cloth and Bells Cut 3:16-3:44, 4 Seconds of Silence (I Have Separated Nothing and Doubled My Heart)" − 3:19
3. "Breathe and Silver Spines Contained (For Stanley Kubrick)" − 3:37
4. "Birds Song_So Sang Them 4:09
5. "Patterns and Fixations Along the Path of Seeing Red" − 4:49
6. "Feel Ard... Ardeel... Feeling Hard... Falling Harder" (Casey Rice) − 6:20
7. "Haphazard Half Hazardous.. Frequencies Push Through Another and Another..." − 3:23
8. "For, Love (No Burst in Beginning)" − 2:46
9. "Through the Window There Was a Green and Blue Dress" − 3:45
10. "Metal Monsters Never Fail Me Now" (Rice) − 3:23
11. "Composition 56 in 4th Place and Still Looking" − 3:42
12. "Them Sang So_Song Birds" − 2:20
13. "Remember The Time It Spun Out and Fell Into Itself. It Never Stopped Rising..." − 5:24
14. "Quietly Sleeping" − 1:21
15. "How Times Turns Itself (Or) That Thought I Had Next Thursday Was a Good One" − 9:05
16. "Underwater and Trying to Find the Stars" − 2:19
17. "Still Looking But Not Breathing" − 0:47
18. "Love, For (Slight Burst in Beginning)" − 1:01

== Personnel ==
- Rob Mazurek – cornet, moog, laptop, found sound, tubular bells
- Casey Rice − Nord Micro Modular, Metal Monster Saturation Pedal (tracks 6, 10 & 13)
