= The Reel =

Studio album by Chad Taylor Trio
- Released: October 28, 2022
- Recorded: May 9, 2022; June 24, 2022
- Studios: Samurai Hotel Recording Studios, Astoria, Queens, New York
- Genre: Jazz
- Labels: Astral Spirits, AS210

Chad Taylor chronology
The Daily Biological (2020)	The Reel (2022)

The Reel is an album by the Chad Taylor Trio, led by drummer Taylor, and featuring saxophonist Brian Settles and pianist Neil Podgurski. The trio's second release, it was recorded on May 9, 2022, and June 24, 2022, at Samurai Hotel Recording Studios in Astoria, Queens, New York, and was issued later that year by Astral Spirits Records.

== Reception ==
Professional ratings
Review scores
Source	Rating
DownBeat	4/5 stars
Tom Hull – on the Web	A−
Jazz Trail	4/5 stars

In a review for DownBeat, Daniel Margolis stated that, in relation to the trio's performances on their debut album, The Reel finds them "even tighter as a unit," engaging in "noteworthy interplay."

Peter Margasak of The Quietus noted that Taylor's "perfectly pitched presence provides propulsion that feels so innate you might hardly notice his particular genius." He suggested that the album "reinforces his abilities as a composer and bandleader, where his weighty, expansive command of his full kit has no problem making up for the lack of a bassist," and commented: "As if we needed more proof of Taylor’s innate musicality, here it is."

Critic Tom Hull awarded the album a grade of "A−", and included it in his list of the best jazz releases of 2022.

Stereogum's Phil Freeman singled out the group's rendition of Andrew Hill's "Reconciliation" for praise, stating that the musicians "seem to be listening to each other quite carefully, and adjusting on the fly to make sure that the piece is holding together, even when it becomes a piano-drums duo; Taylor delivers soft but persistent whaps with brushes as the pianist moves confidently forward, extrapolating Hill's melody and turning it into a series of hypnotically compelling mini-songs."

Writing for Point of Departure, Troy Collins called the album "an aesthetic distillation of Taylor's career to date," and noted the trio's "near clairvoyant level of interplay." He remarked: "Complex yet unpretentious, The Reel boasts a rarefied combination of emotional immediacy and unfettered experimentation... Bringing out the best in his fellow musicians, Taylor relies on the strengths of his seasoned collaborators."

Brad Rose of Foxy Digitalis wrote: "Podgurski squeezes mesmerizing, pointillist patterns into Taylor's angular rhythms, blazing a path that Settles lights on fire. Taylor leads the trio with his vulnerable approach, adding layers of emotional depth and connection. Pensive reflections veer into bop-infused cathartic expositions to give The Reel a rounded, world-traversing joyous feel."

The Downtown Music Gallery's Bruce Lee Gallanter described the album as "a complete marvel from the beginning to the righteous end," and stated: "Considering that this is a trio without a bassist, they do sound great just as they are... all three musicians expand their sound/playing to cover the entire focused trio sound."

Commenting for Jazz Trail, Filipe Freitas remarked: "there are no weak moments on The Reel, an album that holds one's interest on account of emotional honesty and a refreshing musical imagination made with a mix of complete unpretentiousness and necessary complexity. The members of this trio, not being radically different in their tastes and approaches, are definitely on the same page."

The editors of Burning Ambulance included the album in their list of "the 100 best albums of 2022, all genres."

== Track listing ==
1. "Subterfuge" (Andrew Hill) – 6:17
2. "Delta" (Neil Podgurski) – 5:38
3. "Moon Tone Shift" (Brian Settles) – 5:56
4. "Julian's Groove" (Chad Taylor) – 4:34
5. "Nebula" (Neil Podgurski) – 4:52
6. "Reconciliation" (Andrew Hill) – 5:18
7. "Concentric" (Neil Podgurski) – 6:02
8. "The Reel" (Chad Taylor) – 5:32
9. "Omniverse" (Neil Podgurski) – 5:12

== Personnel ==
- Chad Taylor – drums
- Brian Settles – saxophone
- Neil Podgurski – piano
