= Playground (Rob Mazurek album) =

Studio album by Robert Mazurek Chicago Underground Orchestra
- Released: February 10, 1998
- Recorded: March 1 & 2, 1996 and January 6 & 7, 1997
- Studio: Idful, Chicago, Illinois
- Genre: Jazz
- Length: 68:06
- Label: Delmark; DE-503
- Producer: Rob Mazurek, Jeff Parker

Robert Mazurek chronology
| The Unstable Molecule (1998) | Playground (1998) | 12° of Freedom (1998) |

Playground is an album by Robert Mazurek Chicago Underground Orchestra which was released on the Delmark label in 1998.

== Reception ==
Professional ratings
Review scores
| Source | Rating |
|---|---|
| Allmusic | 4/5 stars |

In his review for AllMusic, Rick Watrous states: "A revelation. Cornetist Mazurek and his Chicago Underground Orchestra create some of the freshest sounds of late-'90s jazz. Mazurek and Parker's original tunes have the loose improvisatory feel of Miles Davis and Herbie Hancock's late-'60s compositions, giving soloists free reign [sic] to strut their stuff. ... Imaginative use of instrumental colors and combinations prevail throughout the album".

On All About Jazz Jack Bowers said: "This is an interesting and varied session... Mazurek has abandoned neither melody, harmony nor rhythm, and the band's hard-bop origins can also be discerned from time to time ... Throughout, Rob and the band shrewdly employ uncommon elements - the sound of a glockenspiel or bamboo flute, for example - to accentuate their singular point of view. Everyone is on the same page, and those who fancy Jazz that veers slightly off the beaten path without self-indulgent cerebralism should find this picturesque Playground well-suited to whatever musical byways they might care to pursue"

== Track listing ==
All compositions by Robert Mazurek except where noted

1. "Blow Up" (Herbie Hancock) − 8:17
2. "Flamingos Dancing On Luminescent Moonbeams" − 7:43
3. "Boiled Over" − 8:08
4. "Le Sucrier Velours" (Duke Ellington) − 2:06
5. "Components Changes" (Jeff Parker) − 6:23
6. "Playground" − 10:23
7. "Jeff's New Idea" (Parker) − 6:34
8. "The Inner Soul of H" − 3:02
9. "Whitney" (Parker) − 7:07
10. "Ostinato" − 8:08

== Personnel ==
- Robert Mazurek – cornet, bell, bamboo flute, toy trumpet
- Jeff Parker – guitar, cowbell, recorder
- Sara P. Smith − trombone, glockenspiel, recorder, muffin tin, voice, cymbals
- Chris Lopes − bass, India flute, voice
- Chad Taylor – drums, street sign
- John Herndon − bongos (track 1)
- Dan Bitney − congas (track 1)
- Tony Pinciotti − percussion
