= Good Days (Chicago Underground Quartet album) =

Studio album by Chicago Underground Quartet
- Released: March 27, 2020
- Recorded: July 6, 2018; March 14, 2019; July 9, 2019
- Studios: Big Ego, Long Beach California
- Genre: Free jazz
- Labels: Astral Spirits, AS 125

Chicago Underground Quartet chronology
| Chicago Underground Quartet (2001) | Good Days (2020) |

Good Days is an album by the Chicago Underground Quartet, featuring trumpeter Rob Mazurek, guitarist Jeff Parker, keyboardist Josh Johnson, and drummer Chad Taylor. It was recorded during 2018 and 2019 at Big Ego in Long Beach California, and was released on March 27, 2020 by Astral Spirits Records.

Regarding the 19-year gap between the band's previous release, Chicago Underground Quartet, and Good Days, Mazurek reflected: "It didn't feel like any time had passed. The only thing different is that maybe everyone's concept of making music is stronger after 20 years, but still similar, at least for this thing." Parker stated: "You can hear it, we're a lot better now."

== Reception ==
Professional ratings
Review scores
| Source | Rating |
|---|---|
| All About Jazz | 4/5 stars |
| DownBeat | 4/5 stars |
| The Free Jazz Collective | 4/5 stars |
| Jazz Trail | A− |

In a review for DownBeat, Aaron Cohen wrote: "Good Days illustrates how much the quartet remains a part of Chicago's history of free-jazz and open-ended improvisation... As geographically dispersed as these musicians might be nowadays, they’ve never abandon their ideals."

Daniel Böker of The Free Jazz Collective stated: "the sound is still fresh and I really enjoy the way the Chicago Underground Quartet moves from melody to free improvisation from almost hypnotic beats to more open sounds without losing it completely."

Writing for All About Jazz, Karl Ackermann commented: "Chicago Underground releases are always welcome; this one is a superior example of what maturity and openness can net."

The Chicago Reader's Noah Berlatsky remarked: "Part of what's so engaging and inspirational about Good Days is that it feels like such a natural continuation of the band's freewheeling spirit—something that easily could've ended up being lightning in a bottle, never captured again after the 2001 album."

In an article for Point of Departure, Troy Collins wrote: "As the album progresses, it becomes clear how much the original members have grown over the past two decades... Good Days is a stellar example of artistic maturity, and while it sounds new, it's also a natural continuation of the band's formative work."

Jazz Trail's Filipe Freitas stated: "The versatile members of the Chicago Underground Quartet have an entrenched ability to surprise whether playing within a relaxed context or on the edge of tonality... Good Days marks a very strong return of a formidable quartet."

== Track listing ==
1. "Orgasm" (Alan Shorter) – 5:35
2. "Strange Wing" (Rob Mazurek) – 8:05
3. "Good Days (For Lee Anne)" (Jeff Parker) – 2:54
4. "Batida" (Chad Taylor) – 2:41
5. "All the Bells" (Rob Mazurek) – 4:00
6. "Unique Spiral" (Rob Mazurek) – 5:34
7. "Lomé" (Chad Taylor) – 5:11
8. "Westview" (Chad Taylor) – 3:59

== Personnel ==
- Rob Mazurek – piccolo trumpet, electronics, bells
- Jeff Parker – electric guitar
- Josh Johnson – synth bass, organ, piano
- Chad Taylor – drums, percussion
