= Raymond Salvatore Harmon =

American artist (born 1974)

- Born: Raymond Salvatore Harmon; April 7, 1974; Jackson, Michigan
- Known for: Painter, installation art, new media, experimental film

Raymond Salvatore Harmon (born April 7, 1974) is an American artist who works primarily as a painter.

== Biography ==
Born in Jackson, Michigan in 1974, Raymond Salvatore Harmon has lived outside of the US for 20 years. Harmon currently resides in London, UK.

Harmon is a proponent of non object oriented art. Utilizing architectural scale painting and new media/web based content in coordination with public performance, street style ad bombing, and web based social engineering.

Harmon paints dominantly on an architectural scale, encompassing multistory building facades, sidewalks and street surfaces which he has referred to as "site specific paint installations." Visually his work is based in gestural abstracted forms utilizing intensely vibrant colours to alter the public perception of both the architecture and its contextual environment.

Harmon's previous film work is predominately abstract. Compared to experimental film maker Stan Brakhage, Harmon's use of abstract imagery is more directly influenced by the works of Harry Smith.

His work has been presented at numerous galleries and festivals throughout the world including – The Museum of Contemporary Art, Chicago, Unsound Festival – Kraków, Robert Beck Memorial Cinema, Copenhagen International Documentary Festival, Artist Television Access, Chicago Underground Film Festival, Cement Media Festival, Athens International Film Festival, RAW Tempel – Berlin, Axiom Theater, Northwest Film Forum, Ann Arbor Film Festival, and The Horse Hospital, London.

As a record producer Harmon has worked with artists such as Chicago Underground Trio, Andrew Bird, Jim Baker, Josh Abrams, Rob Mazurek, Kalaparush Maurice McIntyre, as well as collaborated on projects with Alan Licht, David Grubbs, Wolfeyes, the Magik Markers, and Spires that in the Sunset Rise. Additionally Harmon has performed improvised video with numerous musical groups from a diverse background including Exploding Star Orchestra, Rob Mazurek, Blood on the Wall, Diplo, Wolf Parade, Chicago Underground Trio, Birth Refusal, Mandarin Movie, Dave Phillips, HATI, Mikrokolektyw, and Jason Forrest.

== Works ==
=== Exhibitions ===
==== Solo shows ====
"Harmon’s Bizzare", The Old Bank Vault, London, UK 2019

"Escape from Brexitland", Light Eye Mind, London, UK 2018

"Endless Darkness/Endless Light", Larry Farber, Stockholm SE 2018

"Abstract Numerology" - The Old Dentist, London UK 2015
"ACID" - Imitate Modern Gallery, London, UK 2015
"MIRAGE" - LERATA/Skyline14, Los Angeles, CA 2014
"Keeper of the Gates" - Hackney Wicked, London, UK, 2013
"META" - 199 Chrystie, New York, NY, 2012
"GNOSIS" - Hackney Wicked, London, UK, 2012
"Dweller on the Threshold" - Secret Project Robot, Brooklyn NY, 2009
"Transcendental Territories" - Inspire Fine Art, Chicago, 2007
"Isolated Instances" - Open End Gallery, Chicago, IL, 2004
"Isolated Instances" - Heaven Gallery, Chicago, IL, 2004
"Oneirographers Closet" - Feitico Gallery, Chicago, IL, 2001
"Dreamlife of Sleeping Buildings" - Cement Media, Eindhoven, Holland, 2001
"Subliminal Scores" - Around the Coyote, Chicago, IL, 2000
"Sprayed On In Light" - Outerpretation Media, Chicago, IL, 1997

==== Group shows ====
"Κατάσταση/Situation Athina" - IFAC, Athens, Greece 2015
"The Wrong - New Digital Art Biennale" - arebyte Gallery "Distrophies" Pavilion, London, UK 2015
"Light" - Alvarado Gallery, London, UK 2014
"Separation Anxiety II: RELAPSE" - Wallplay Gallery, New York, NY 2014
"Carnival of Colour" - Imitate Modern Gallery, London UK 2014
"Transmissions" - Galleria Mirada, Ravenna, Italy 2013
"Studio Upstairs" - The Royal Academy of Arts, London, UK 2012
"Stirrings Still" - White Box, New York, NY, 2010
"XD 01. User Experience" - SUDLAB, Naples, Italy, 2010
"Manifest Destiny" - Urban 15, San Antonio, TX, 2008
Group show - La Enana Maron, Madrid, Spain, 2007
"Love and Other Difficulties" - Images and Views, Nicosia, Cyprus, 2006
"Infernal Bridegroom" - Axiom, Houston, TX, 2005
"Third Thursdays" - CHAOS Studios Artspace, Colorado Springs, CO, 2004
Group show - 111 Minna Gallery, San Francisco, CA, 2004
"May Flowers" - 21 Grand, Oakland, CA 2002

=== Filmography ===
- Sprayed On In Light – 1997
- staticerosion – 1999
- Les Fantomes de Lumiere – 2000
- Tiny Inconsistencies – 2001
- The Koan of Sisyphus – 2001
- Unfolding Urban Algorithms – 2001
- Six Ways Sideways – 2001
- A Map of the City – 2001
- ambientlight – 2002
- Daath – 2002
- Fireflies – 2003
- Cloud of Unknowing – 2003
- The Three Stigmata of Marshall McLuhan – 2003
- Resistance – 2004
- violetsummer – 2004
- Reliquary of Light (for Mr Boyd Lynn) – 2004
- YHVH – 2005
- Plexus Illuminata – 2005
- Tree of Life/Tree of Knowledge – 2006
- Elevated – 2006
- Colorform – 2006
- redlight – 2006
- Secrets – 2006
- Cornerstone – 2006
- Chronicle – 2006
- 11:11 – 2006
- Traces – 2007
- Sigils of the Heptameron – 2007
- Veves + Loas – 2007
- The Philosopher's Stone – 2008
- The Temptation of St Anthony – 2008
- Tactic – 2008
- Aleister Crowley's Rites of Eleusis – 2008
- Hecate's Moon – 2008
- A Story Never Told – 2008
- Hypnotic Brutality – 2008
- First Corruption – 2008
- Colossal Portal – 2008
- Liber O vel Manus et Sagittae – 2009
- Language Virus – 2009
- Choronzon (Dweller on the Threshold) – 2009
- Der Erlkönig – 2009
- Sat Around for Peace – 2009
- Greyscape – 2010
- Hadit – 2010
- Sound in Motion – 2010
- Dew Point – 2010
- At Night's End – 2010
- The Revelations of Maria Sabina – 2010
- Guerrilla Conditions: A Séance for Antony Balch – 2013
