= Chronicle (Chicago Underground Trio album) =

Live album by Chicago Underground Trio
- Released: 2007
- Recorded: July 21, 2006
- Venue: German Cultural Center, Chicago
- Genre: Free jazz
- Length: 1:13:55
- Label: Delmark; DE 573 (CD); DVD 1573 (DVD)
- Producer: Rob Mazurek, Robert G. Koester, Raymond Salvatore Harmon (DVD)

Chicago Underground Trio chronology
Slon (2004)	Chronicle (2007)

Chronicle is a live album by the Chicago Underground Trio, featuring trumpeter Rob Mazurek, bassist Jason Ajemian, and drummer Chad Taylor. It was recorded on July 21, 2006, at the German Cultural Center in Chicago, and was released in 2007 by Delmark Records in both CD and DVD formats, the latter directed by Raymond Salvatore Harmon.

== Reception ==
Professional ratings
Review scores
Source	Rating
AllMusic	4/5 stars
The Free Jazz Collective	4/5 stars
PopMatters	7/10 stars

In a review for AllMusic, Michael G. Nastos wrote: "At times deadpan, often spirited, spiritual and symmetrical with plenty of ideas that work well, the group succeeds in clearly bringing its point across, and those who enjoy this type of pure improvising should find it intriguing."

Seamus Seoighe of All About Jazz called the album a "sonic spiritual journey," and stated: "the Chicago Underground is constantly presenting music that is innovative, new and, without a doubt, boundary-breaking." AAJ's Jerry D'Souza commented: "Chicago Underground has never shied away from being bold and innovative. They prove it all over again with this performance, where everything is completely improvised."

Writing for JazzTimes, David Whiteis remarked: "Our preconceived expectations of what things might be are challenged, mocked and then reimagined, only to dissolve and re-emerge yet again in new forms."

A reviewer for The Free Jazz Collective noted: "The band takes its time to discover the music, to transform it, to think of new angles, but the overall structure is essential, this is free improv along fixed paths. This is avant-garde jazz or experimental jazz, but then with soul."

In an article for PopMatters, Will Layman wrote: "There are many times during Chronicle when you wonder — what is that guy playing? Often, you will not be able to decipher it... The music presented here is daring, compelling, occasionally vexing, but always alive with interest."

Regarding the DVD release, Vish Khanna of Exclaim! stated: "Coupled with intense and dynamic playing from the Chicago Underground Trio, the visual aspects of Chronicle are alluring and disorienting."

== Track listing ==
Composed by the Chicago Underground Trio.

1. "Initiation" – 5:23
2. "Resistance" – 7:43
3. "Power" – 28:27
4. "Crisis" – 13:20
5. "Transformation" – 5:22
6. "Transcendence" – 13:43

== Personnel ==
- Rob Mazurek – cornet, computer, synthesizer, electric celeste, gong, cymbal, bamboo flute, Moogerfooger pedals
- Jason Ajemian – acoustic bass, electronics
- Chad Taylor – drums, vibraphone, marimba, mbira, percussion
