= Age of Energy =

Studio album by Chicago Underground Duo
- Released: 2012
- Recorded: December 6, 2010, and June 30th, 2011
- Studio: Bel Air Studios, Chicago
- Genre: Free jazz
- Label: Northern Spy; NSCD 020

Chicago Underground Duo chronology
Boca Negra (2010)	Age of Energy (2012)	Locus (2014)

Age of Energy is an album by the Chicago Underground Duo, featuring multi-instrumentalists Rob Mazurek and Chad Taylor. It was recorded on December 6, 2010, and June 30, 2011, at Bel Air Studios in Chicago, Illinois, and was issued in 2012 by Northern Spy Records as the group's first release for the label.

== Reception ==
Professional ratings
Review scores
Source	Rating
AllMusic	4/5 stars
The Free Jazz Collective	4/5 stars
PopMatters	8/10 stars
Tiny Mix Tapes	3/5 stars

In a review for AllMusic, Thom Jurek wrote: "The pair's evolved attitude about music making and improvisation is deeply focused and intuitive... Age of Energy contains so many tiny sonic and musical elements, it's impossible to classify, but that's its strong point. This is modern music at its most inventive, allowing CUD to create its own vocabulary."

The Free Jazz Collective's Paul Acquaro stated: "The album is aptly titled, the duo captures the bits, bytes, fumes and fusions of our age with an expert blend of electronic sounds and acoustic instruments. Melodies and motifs are ephemeral, a constant flow of ideas and sound, grafting the organic and electric. A fitting soundtrack to our times."

John Garratt of PopMatters commented: "What style do we call the Chicago Underground Duo? Nothing. Or maybe just 'music'. To these ears it sounds like two men equipped with a variety of instruments and electronics jamming these 'songs' into creation, taking their sweet time doing so and not spending a split second worrying about what label people may or may not want to slap on it."

Writing for Tiny Mix Tapes, Clifford Allen remarked: "While not their strongest statement to date, Age of Energy is still a viable piece of the puzzle, and following the work of Mazurek and Taylor remains a near-requirement for those invested in modern creative music."

S. Victor Aaron of Something Else! noted that the album "continues their long tradition of exploration, explosions and meditation," and wrote: "Creating in the moment like their AACM brethren but with the lo-fi electronic effects of an indie act and other creative mashings, the Chicago Underground Duo continue to make the case for all the original sounding music that is possible by just two, open minded and innovative musicians."

In an article for Bird is the Worm, Dave Sumner stated that the album "switches seamlessly between music of fire, air, and water," and commented: "Really a wonderful album that throws enough curveballs to keep the album perpetually interesting and uncategorizable. The sort of avant-garde music that could appeal to a wide cross-section of genre fans."

== Track listing ==
Composed by the Chicago Underground Duo.

1. "Winds and Sweeping Pines" – 19:56
2. "It's Alright" – 10:56
3. "Castle in Your Heart" – 4:36
4. "Age of Energy" – 6:40

== Personnel ==
- Rob Mazurek – cornet, electronics, voice
- Chad Taylor – drums, mbira, electronics, drum machine
