= Chicago Underground Quartet (album) =

Studio album by Chicago Underground Quartet
- Released: 2001
- Recorded: August 2000
- Studio: Soma, Chicago
- Genre: Free jazz
- Length: 41:50
- Label: Thrill Jockey; 093

Chicago Underground Quartet chronology
Chicago Underground Quartet (2001)	Good Days (2020)

Chicago Underground Quartet is the debut album by the jazz ensemble of the same name, featuring trumpeter Rob Mazurek, guitarist Jeff Parker, bassist Noel Kupersmith, and drummer Chad Taylor. It was recorded during August 2000 at Soma in Chicago, and was released in 2001 by Thrill Jockey.

== Reception ==
Professional ratings
Review scores
Source	Rating
AllMusic	4/5 stars
The Penguin Guide to Jazz	3.5/4 stars
Pitchfork	7.4/10 stars

In a review for AllMusic, John Duffy wrote: "Merging the organic sounds of post-bop jazz with modern electronic and progressive music requires a delicate approach... few young jazz players are daring to go this far on record. All the more telling, an indie label had the courage to release it."

The Penguin Guide to Jazz said "Dreamy, slippery music, calling up memories of old prog-rock situations but never quite resolving them, it's fusion for the ages, and curiously addictive."

Mark Richardson of Pitchfork stated: "The Chicago Underground Quartet know how to integrate technology into their distinctive jazz sound. It's a fusion of some kind... so Wynton would not approve. But I'd call it a worthy extension of the tradition."

Writing for All About Jazz, Mark Corroto commented: "The band has fully realized their concepts of modernism in the form of free jazz meet electronics and minimalism... Like the former fellow Chicago residents known as Sun Ra's Arkestra, the Chicago Underground Quartet are taking their musical performance to another level, beyond the expectations of their own generation." Another AAJ reviewer remarked: "The most exciting moments on Chicago Underground Quartet lie at the intersection between different musical territories, which the group self-confidently treats as a fluid continuum... Each tune on this record... is a composition in the formal sense. Themes and moods receive detailed attention before the quartet moves on. But the disc is constructed in a coherent way so that it acquires body and spirit as a whole."

In an article for My City Paper, Nate Chinen noted: "Chicago Underground Quartet manages to emulate both the intelligent chaos of the AACM and the spooky minimalism of Brian Eno... Post-jazz? Perhaps. At the very least, it represents a new brand of chemistry, and the most consistently vital album of this ensemble's evolving career."

Matt Cibula of PopMatters praised the individual musicians, calling them "four of the tightest and most precise young jazz musicians working today," but stated that the group "played it safe... and it didn't pay off."

== Track listing ==
1. "Tunnel Chrome" (Rob Mazurek) – 5:19
2. "Four in the Evening" (Jeff Parker) – 1:32
3. "A Re-Occurring Dream" (Chad Taylor) – 3:11
4. "Welcome" (Rob Mazurek) – 7:32
5. "Three in the Morning" (Jeff Parker) – 5:18
6. "Total Recovery" (Chad Taylor) – 4:02
7. "Sink, Charge, Fixture" (Chicago Underground Quartet) – 3:50
8. "Wo Ist Der Kuchen, Meine Frau" (Noel Kupersmith) – 4:24
9. "Nostalgia" (Rob Mazurek) – 6:42

== Personnel ==
- Rob Mazurek – cornet, electronics
- Jeff Parker – guitar
- Noel Kupersmith – bass
- Chad Taylor – percussion, vibraphone
