= Spiral Mercury =

Live album by Chicago/São Paulo Underground featuring Pharoah Sanders
- Released: 2014
- Recorded: August 11, 2013
- Venue: Jazz em Agosto Festival, Lisbon
- Genre: Free jazz
- Length: 1:16:01
- Label: Clean Feed; CF301CD
- Producer: Rob Mazurek

Spiral Mercury is a live album by Pharoah & the Underground, featuring saxophonist Pharoah Sanders, trumpeter Rob Mazurek and drummer Chad Taylor of the Chicago Underground Duo, along with percussionist Mauricio Takara of the São Paulo Underground, bassist Matthew Lux of the Pulsar Quartet, and multi-instrumentalist Guilherme Granado. It was recorded on August 11, 2013, at the Jazz em Agosto Festival in Lisbon, and was released in 2014 by Clean Feed Records.

== Reception ==
Professional ratings
Review scores
Source	Rating
AllMusic	4.5/5 stars
All About Jazz	5/5 stars
All About Jazz	4.5/5 stars
The Free Jazz Collective	4.5/5 stars
Tom Hull – on the Web	B+

In a review for AllMusic, Fred Thomas called the album an "exceptional live document," and wrote: "The disc tends toward the more experimental and tumultuous side of things, with processed synth sounds clashing with the explosive organic instrumentation in a way that brings to mind Sun Ra's rudimentary synth experimentation on his early-'70s Saturn Records output... the group explores moody bass grooves, glitchy electronic tinkering that occasionally borders on noise, and a kind of high-energy free expression close in spirit to the kind Sanders pioneered in the mid-'60s."

Karl Ackermann of All About Jazz described the album as a "high-energy mix of ideas," and noted that "Sanders plays as though he is having the time of his life in such a free setting." AAJ's Glenn Astarita commented: "the band merges contrasting layers, disparate textures, ungodly shadings and more than enough excitement to sustain interest from beginning to end. The album is counterbalanced by an amalgamation of subtle oddities that outline the ensemble's unmistakably detectable watermark that vaults the jazz genre into parts unknown."

Writing for The Free Jazz Collective, Matthew Grigg stated: "Whether devotional rhythmic grooves, searching abstraction or full-throttle velocity, the interaction between the musicians is never less than adroitly judged, simultaneously casting a glancing eye backward whilst straining for the farthest reaches of the cosmos."

The editors of The Quietus included the album in their "Favoured Jazz Albums of 2014" list, calling it "a joy," and remarking: "Mazurek conjures a hazy tropical atmosphere in which cosmic jazz, improv, funk and electronics dance freely."

In an article for The New York City Jazz Record, Alex Henderson wrote: "Space is used extensively and the Chicago school of avant garde jazz is clearly an influence thanks, in part, to the input of Mazurek and Taylor—while there are heated moments, the musicians build up to them instead of clobbering the listener from the get-go."

David Whiteis of JazzTimes stated: "The overall feel here is of remarkable coherence... Sanders is in peak form, caustic yet radiant, occasionally softening into prayer-like tranquility before exploding into his trademark overtone shrieks."

== Track listing ==
Composed by Rob Mazurek.

1. "Gna Toom" – 14:47
2. "Spiral Mercury" – 8:58
3. "Blue Sparks From Her" – 12:17
4. "Asasumamehn" – 5:31
5. "Pigeon" – 12:57
6. "Jagoda's Dream" – 9:35
7. "The Ghost Zoo" – 11:51

== Personnel ==
- Pharoah Sanders – tenor saxophone, voice
- Rob Mazurek – cornet, flute, electronics, voice
- Chad Taylor – drums, mbira
- Guilherme Granado – percussion, sampler, synthesizer, voice
- Matthew Lux – electric bass
- Mauricio Takara – percussion, electronics, cavaquinho
