= How to Turn the Moon =

Studio album by Angelica Sanchez and Marilyn Crispell
- Released: 2020
- Recorded: September 28, 2019
- Studio: Nevessa Production, Woodstock, New York
- Genre: Free jazz
- Label: Pyroclastic Records; PR 10

How to Turn the Moon is an album by pianists Angelica Sanchez and Marilyn Crispell. It was recorded at Nevessa Production in Woodstock, New York, in September 2019, and was released in 2020 by Pyroclastic Records.

The album features ten pieces by Sanchez, three co-written with Crispell, composed after the two met at Karl Berger's Creative Music Studio. Sanchez stated: "Each piece is designed to be different every time we play it."

== Reception ==
Professional ratings
Review scores
Source	Rating
DownBeat	4/5 stars
Financial Times	4/5 stars
All About Jazz	4/5 stars

In a review for DownBeat, Alex W. Rodríguez wrote: "How To Turn The Moon features this intergenerational duo exploring the edges of their respective imaginations through in-the-moment collaboration, the occasionally intense flourishes and dense clusters of sound belying a playful intimacy... the pair impress with their commitment to the exploration of a vast range of sonic territories. Although it's often hard to tell who's leading and who's following, together the duo invite listeners to a dance where they investigate each moment's possibility."

Mike Hobart, writing for the Financial Times, stated: "Sanchez and Crispell navigate the boundaries between improvisation and composition with narrative rigour and technical expertise... The result is an emotionally focused set laden with vivid contrasts and intricate interplay that makes the freely improvised sound pre-composed and the written seem created on the fly."

In an article for Jazz Times, Martin Johnson commented: "Instead of searching for middle ground on each tune, the pianists use their commonalities as a basis for immediate improvisational flights... Both pianists are skilled at making big points quickly; the joy in this recording comes not from a duel of virtuosic expositions but from the insightful ways each builds on the other’s innovations."

All About Jazz's Dan McClenaghan stated: "Both pianists are searchers, open to the unconventional. 'Let's see what happens' players who embrace the sounds of surprise and off center beauty into their artistries."

Hrayr Attarian of Chicago Jazz Magazine remarked: "This album is a seamless collection of Sanchez's compositions and the duo's spontaneously created ones. It highlights the pianists' contrasting individualities as well as the fluid synergy between them... This innovative recording will haunt the listeners long after the music has stopped playing."

In a review for Jazz Views, Ken Cheetham wrote: "The pieces are enigmatic, intensely poetic, yet depend on brevity, allowing space for extensive invention in which each musician is completely free to grow and extemporise as she may wish. This does not mean that you will hear a clamour between the duo as each strives to win the stage with their musical technique: rather are they perceptive in their exertions to build on each other's inventions. This is the delight that the duo creates as their pianos shine and tingle and reverberate, as one."

In a review for Dusted Magazine, Marc Medwin stated: "Very rarely does a two-piano album live up to its potential. This one does... Throughout, each player is equally conscious of space and timbre, two elements missing from so many collaborative piano discs with reputations far outstripping their musical importance."

Peter Thelen of Exposé Online remarked: "put on the headphones and drop the lights down low and hear what's really going on between these two as their expressive playing reaches in and touches your soul."

The Whole Note's Kati Kiilaspea commented: "For those looking for a complete musical experience, this album would make a very worthy addition to your collection."

== Track listing ==
"Space Junk", "Windfall Light", and "Rain in Web" by Angelica Sanchez and Marilyn Crispell. Remaining tracks by Angelica Sanchez.

1. "Lobe of the Fly" – 2:44
2. "Ancient Dream" – 5:16
3. "Calyces of Held" – 8:08
4. "Space Junk" – 3:10
5. "Ceiba Portal" – 8:08
6. "Windfall Light" – 4:59
7. "Twisted Roots" – 2:32
8. "Sullivan's Universe" – 7:02
9. "Rain in Web" – 3:37
10. "Fires in Space" – 4:24

== Personnel ==
- Angelica Sanchez – piano
- Marilyn Crispell – piano
