= David Bloom (musician) =

American musician

- Origin: Chicago, Illinois, United States
- Genres: Jazz
- Occupations: Educator, composer, arranger, producer
- Instruments: Guitar, flute
- Years active: 1975–present
- Website: BloomSchoolofJazz.com

David M. Bloom is an American guitarist, flautist, composer/arranger/producer, educator, author, and director. Bloom founded the Bloom School of Jazz in Chicago where he continues to teach. Notable musicians who have attended the Bloom School include Alex Wurman, Graham Maby, Steve Rodby, Jon Weber, Cliff Colnot, Rob Parton, Mark Colby, and Rob Mazurek, with workshops from John Scofield and Mike Stern. Bloom authors jazz instruction books under his own Bloom School of Jazz Publishing which is distributed by Hal Leonard. Along with composing, arranging, writing, and directing The Bloom School of Jazz, Bloom directs documentary films about essential human values. Bloom's father was the late educational psychologist Benjamin Bloom, who made major contributions to the classification of educational objectives and to the theory of mastery-learning. David Bloom's own applications of mastery-learning have made him one of the most sought after teachers in Jazz today.

== Early years ==
David Bloom was born in Chicago. At age nine, he began studying clarinet with the Chicago Symphony Orchestra's first clarinetist, Jerome Stowell. A year later Bloom moved to California and began studying folk guitar with a Mrs. Shnyder. He then moved back to Chicago at 11 and played folk music with his brother until fifteen, when he started a rock-blues band. At seventeen, Bloom attended a blues concert at the University of Chicago Blues Festival where he heard Buddy Guy and was so moved by his playing that he called him up the next day and asked if he would teach him. Guy told Bloom that he had never taught anyone before but Bloom convinced him to give him a lesson. When asked how much the lesson would cost, Guy told him "five dollars." When asked "for how long?" Guy responded, "as long as it takes." Bloom studied with Guy every Sunday for a year. He then got a job at Harry Fistel's Chicago musicians co-op where he met an exceptional blues guitarist, William McDonald. William took David to Pepper's Lounge and introduced him to everyone in the place, as well as encouraging him to sit in with numerous bands on the south side (Pepper's Lounge and Teresa's), and on the west side (Sportsman's Lounge and Walton's Corner). After studying with Buddy Guy, Bloom began studying with Reginald Boyd, a master musician and the musical contractor at Chess Records. At nineteen Bloom went to Berklee College of Music for two years.

== Publications ==
- Minor Blues For Guitar Vol.1
- Major Blues For Guitar Vol.1
- Melodic Chords For Guitar
- The II V I Book
- Rhythms Around The Body
- Ear-Training Sight Singing
- The Question Answer Book
- Melodic Linkage

== Discography ==
- Melody for Margaret (1976)
- Duende (David Bloom, Cliff Colnot) (2007)
- Until We Meet Again (David Bloom, Cliff Colnot) (2008)
- Contender (2017)
- Shadow of a Soul (2021)
- Mirage (2022)
