= Locus (Chicago Underground Duo album) =

Studio album by Chicago Underground Duo
- Released: 2014
- Studios: Soma Electronic Music Studios, Chicago
- Genre: Free jazz
- Labels: Northern Spy; NSCD 052

Chicago Underground Duo chronology
| Age of Energy (2012) | Locus (2014) | Hyperglyph (2025) |

Locus is an album by the Chicago Underground Duo, featuring multi-instrumentalists Rob Mazurek and Chad Taylor. It was recorded at Soma Electronic Music Studios in Chicago, Illinois, and was issued in 2014 by Northern Spy Records as the group's second release for the label.

== Reception ==
Professional ratings
Review scores
| Source | Rating |
|---|---|
| AllMusic | 3.5/5 stars |
| The Free Jazz Collective | 4/5 stars |
| All About Jazz | 4/5 stars |
| PopMatters | 7/10 stars |
| The Vinyl District | B+ |

In a review for AllMusic, Matt Collar called Locus "a frenetic album buzzing with creativity and avant-garde vitality," and "an album of quick hitters that nonetheless leaves a lasting impression."

A reviewer for The Free Jazz Collective wrote: "the overall sound alternates dark passages with celebratory and upbeat injections, as a collage of sonic colours, danceable even, as a great mix of sounds from across the globe, but preferably its most tropical parts, its most tropical parties, in a dense atmosphere of warm fun with subterranean gloom and high energy madness."

Troy Collins of All About Jazz stated: "Locus seamlessly incorporates myriad genres, ranging from polyrhythmic swingers and avant-garde divertissements to cinematic soundscapes and impressionistic tone poems. On the eve of their second decade performing together, Rob Mazurek and Chad Taylor demonstrate that there are ample sound worlds left for the Chicago Underground Duo to explore."

Writing for PopMatters, Steve Horowitz described the album as "dense, adventurous," and commented: "it is not always clear who is doing what, but there is always something going on. What may seem like improvisation becomes a particular point or a place — a locus. While identifying the exact location may be impossible, the music does seem to move according to mathematically defined circumstances."

The Vinyl District's Joseph Neff remarked: "The Chicago Underground Duo is now appropriately described as a tandem of veterans, but the secret to their continued relevance is how they tackle their art with youthful vigor. This... is a fine addition to their already impressively consistent discography, and anybody that's enjoyed one of their albums in the past... shouldn't hesitate to give Locus a try."

In an article for The Big Takeover, Chuck Foster wrote: "Purists may dismiss Locus as not jazz, but just as John Coltrane played with 'My Favorite Things' and Sun Ra mutated Disney standards, The Chicago Underground Duo is taking the modern electronic vernacular and bending it into something else new and exciting."

S. Victor Aaron of Something Else! noted that the musicians' "deft application of lo-fi electronics to out-jazz has been celebrated here a few times, and Locus... is another reason to celebrate."

David Kopacz of Being Fully Human called the recording "a beautiful, catchy, challenging and dissonant album," and stated: "Definitely experimental jazz and experiments are often risky and don't always pay off, even when creative, but it is great when it all comes together."

== Track listing ==
1. "Locus" (Chad Taylor, Rob Mazurek) – 3:41
2. "Boss" (Ken Prince) – 4:15
3. "The Human Economy" (Chad Taylor, Rob Mazurek) – 2:35
4. "Yaa Yaa Kole" (Pan-African Orchestra) – 4:33
5. "House of the Axe" (Chad Taylor, Rob Mazurek) – 5:28
6. "Borrow and Burry" (Chad Taylor, Rob Mazurek) – 3:58
7. "Blink Out" (Chad Taylor, Rob Mazurek) – 5:44
8. "Kabuki" (Chad Taylor, Rob Mazurek) – 5:27
9. "Dante" (Chad Taylor, Rob Mazurek) – 4:06

== Personnel ==
- Rob Mazurek – cornet, synthesizer, Game Boy, electronics, bamboo flute, voice
- Chad Taylor – drums, mbira, guitar, balafon
