= Myths and Morals =

Studio album by Chad Taylor
- Released: 2018
- Recorded: March 20, 2017
- Studio: Experimental Sound Studio, Chicago
- Genre: Jazz
- Label: Ears & Eyes Records; 18-o72

Chad Taylor chronology
Circle Down (2009)	Myths and Morals (2018)	The Daily Biological (2020)

Myths and Morals is a solo album by drummer Chad Taylor. It was recorded on March 20, 2017, at Experimental Sound Studio in Chicago, and was released on vinyl in 2018 by Ears & Eyes Records. The album is also available as a digital download, with a bonus track featuring Elliot Bergman on electric kalimba.

In an interview, Taylor stated that some of his favorite jazz albums are solo drum recordings, and expressed an admiration for Jerome Cooper's The Unpredictability of Predictability and Milford Graves' Grand Unification Regarding the album title, he commented: "All of the major religions share the same morals but yet we need to believe only our 'myth' is the one that's real and the morals that we think are associated with that myth are the only morals that are important... We take everybody else's myths and morals for granted, yet it is this collective of myths and morals that define who and what we are as a whole."

== Reception ==
Professional ratings
Review scores
Source	Rating
All About Jazz	4.5/5 stars
DownBeat	4/5 stars
The Free Jazz Collective	4/5 stars
Tom Hull – on the Web	B+

The editors of DownBeat included the recording in their list of 2018's top-rated albums, and reviewer Aaron Cohen wrote: "Taylor's compositions add up to a strong narrative that runs throughout the album. Essentially, he uses his instrument's melodic possibilities to create different shapes in a shifting dialogue with silence."

The New York City Jazz Record's Kurt Gottschalk stated: "Solo drum records are a tricky affair and drumkit records especially so... But presumably anyone buying a solo drum record knows what they're in for. For those listeners, pleasant surprises await."

Jakob Baekgaard of All About Jazz commented: "Myths and Morals is a lively dialog with the vibrant sounds of the world. The music acknowledges the masters that have been here before while searching for new sounds in a language that is both personal and universal."

Writing for Stereogum, Phil Freeman remarked: "The drumming is powerful and hypnotic... He makes the kit sing, the way Max Roach and Elvin Jones used to, while his cymbals have an almost Sunny Murray-esque attack at times. These aren't drum solos in the bombastic sense of that term. They're intricate works that build and recede, then come back again, and reach natural conclusions."

In an article for the Chicago Reader, Peter Margasak stated that the album "conveys a composerly vision even though much of it is fully improvised... Certain pieces deftly use electronics and looping to create hypnotic foundations, such as the stellar opening track, 'Arcadia,' an atmospheric masterpiece that's more about creating an immersive environment than improvisational development."

Dusted Magazine's Bill Meyer noted: "While his equipment is restricted... his compositional imagination is wide open. These pieces may tarry for a moment on some texture or pattern, but for the most part they are studies in constant development. Precision and restraint yield surprise and mystery; the music is so involving and complete that it's easy to forget that you're listening to solo percussion."

S. Victor Aaron of Something Else! suggested that Taylor viewed the album as "an opportunity to show all the possibilities for a fresh approach to music making that can come from percussion alone," and wrote: "Taylor takes this occasion... to show you stuff you won't hear on all the numerous, critically acclaimed projects he became involved with, but Myths and Morals makes it pretty clear why he's constantly in demand for these projects."

Commenting for A Jazz Noise, Dave Foxall remarked: "this is not your average drum album filled with show-off chops, complex tricks, and a wilfully obscure collection of percussion instruments... Myths and Morals is a damn sight more nuanced than that, leaning heavily on a subtle application of texture and colour... Incredibly intimate, surprising, and certainly hypnotic. Most of all, perhaps, utterly absorbing."

The Free Jazz Collective's Eric McDowell wrote: "Call it polyphony—or better yet, polyrhythm. On Myths and Morals, these techniques are as much a matter of Taylor's limb independence as they are his aesthetic approach, which gathers together heavy grooves, free improvisation, mbira melodicism, and electronic manipulation."

== Track listing ==
1. "Arcadia" – 6:47
2. "Phoenix" – 6:02
3. "The Fall of Babel" – 6:14
4. "Carnation" – 4:11
5. "Gum Tree" – 3:32
6. "Abtu and Anet" – 3:28
7. "Island of the Blessed" – 9:05
8. "Simcha" – 1:44 (bonus track available on digital download)

== Personnel ==
- Chad Taylor – drums
- Elliot Bergman – electric kalimba (track 8)
