= Angelica Sanchez (musician) =

American jazz pianist

- Born: 1972 (age 53–54); Phoenix, Arizona, US
- Genres: Jazz, post-bop
- Occupation: Musician
- Instrument: Piano
- Labels: Sunnyside, Clean Feed, Marge
- Website: www.angelicasanchez.com

Angelica Sanchez (born 1972) is an American jazz pianist based in New York. Sanchez leads her own quartet featuring Tony Malaby, Drew Gress, and Tom Rainey. She is a member of Rob Mazurek's Exploding Star Orchestra

Her 2022 album Sparkle Beings was ranked the #8 best jazz album of 2022 by The New York Times.

== Life and work ==
Sanchez was born in Phoenix, Arizona, in 1972. From 1990 to 1994 she studied piano and composition at Arizona State University. She moved to New York from Arizona in 1994 and has been collaborating with a wide variety of artists in the New York jazz scene for over 25 years.

== Discography ==
=== Albums ===
==== As leader or co-leader ====
Year released	Title	Label	Notes
2003	Mirror Me	Omnitone	Quartet w Tony Malaby (tenor sax), Michael Formanek (bass), and Tom Rainey (drums).
2008	Life Between	Clean Feed	Quintet w Marc Ducret (guitar), Tony Malaby (tenor and soprano sax), Drew Gress (bass), and Tom Rainey (drums)
2011	A Little House	Clean Feed	Solo - Piano, toy piano
2012	Wires and Moss	Clean Feed	Quintet w Marc Ducret (guitar), Tony Malaby (tenor and soprano sax), Drew Gress (bass), and Tom Rainey (drums).
2013	Twine Forest	Trem Azul	Duet with Wadada Leo Smith (trumpet)
2017	Float the Edge	Clean Feed	Trio w. Michael Formanek (double bass), Tyshawn Sorey (drums)
2020	How to Turn the Moon	Pyroclastic	Duet with Marilyn Crispell
2022	Sparkle Beings	Sunnyside	Trio w. Michael Formanek (bass) and Billy Hart (drums)
2023	Nighttime Creatures	Pyroclastic	Nonet w. Kenny Warren (cornet), Thomas Heberer (quarter-tone trumpet), Michaël Attias (alto sax), Chris Speed (tenor sax, clarinet), Ben Goldberg (contralto clarinet), Omar Tamez (guitar), John Hébert (bass) and Sam Ospovat (drums)
2024	A Monster Is Just An Animal You Haven't Met Yet	Intakt Records	Duo with Chad Taylor (drums)
2024	Live At Jazzdor	Maya Recordings	Trio w. Barry Guy (bass) and Ramón López (drums)

==== As sidewoman ====
Year released	Title	Label	Notes
2004	Alive In Brooklyn	Sarama Records	Trio w Tony Malaby (tenor sax) and Tom Rainey (drums)
2005	Alive In Brooklyn, Vol. 2	Sarama Records	Trio w Tony Malaby (tenor sax) and Tom Rainey (drums)
2011	September Trio	Clean Feed	Trio w Harris Einsenstadt (drums, leader) and Ellery Eskelin (tenor sax)
2011	The Destructive Element	Rogue Art	Trio w Harris Einsenstadt (drums, leader) and Ellery Eskelin (tenor sax)
2024	In Another Land, Another Dream	Relative Pitch Records	Duo w. Camila Nebbia (tenor sax, leader)
2012	Stellar Pulsations	Delmark	Quartet w. Rob Mazurek Pulsar 4tet
2020	A Songbirds Temple	FMR Records	Trio w. Paul Dunmall (tenor sax, alto flute) and Mark Sanders (drums)
2022	Huapango	Rogue Art	Trio w Tony Malaby (tenor sax) and Tom Rainey (drums)
2023	Circle Down	482 Music	Trio led by Chad Taylor
2023	Lightning Dreamers	International Anthem	As part of Rob Mazurek Exploding Star Orchestra
