= Slon (album) =

2004 studio album by Chicago Underground Trio

Studio album by Chicago Underground Trio
- Released: January 20, 2004
- Recorded: April 27–30, 2003 in Chicago
- Genre: Jazz
- Label: Thrill Jockey
- Producer: Bundy K. Brown

Chicago Underground Trio chronology
Flamethrower (2000)	Slon (2004)	Chronicle (2007)

Slon is the third album from the Chicago Underground Trio. The album was released in January 2004 on Thrill Jockey Records . This is their first release on Thrill Jockey, their first two albums were released by Delmark Records. The album was produced by Bundy K. Brown. The trio consists of Rob Mazurek on cornet, Noel Kupersmith on bass and Chad Taylor on drums. This is their last release with bassist Noel Kupersmith. Mazurek and Taylor have also combined as the Chicago Underground Duo and with the Chicago Underground Orchestra.

== Overview ==
Slon combines the sounds of a traditional jazz combo with electronic overdubs. The songs were developed during their European No War Tour and written over a one-month period then recorded in Chicago. The track "Palmero" includes recorded sounds from a Sicilian fish market. This is their last release with bassist Noel Kupersmith, Jason Ajemian plays bass on their next release, Chronicle.

== Reception ==
Slon
Review scores
Source	Rating
AllMusic	4/5 stars
Pitchfork	7.5/10 stars

In comparison to their earlier work, Gregory McIntosh of AllMusic writes that the combo is "more focused on an overall concept for the record as an atmospheric listen" and that the album "is a document of a band that has really hit its stride". When commenting on the combo's use of computers John L. Walters of The Guardian wrote that they use them for "anything from ambient noise to throbbing riffs". He goes on to write that "Mazurek's inventive improvisations dance around Taylor's live, open-sounding kit, while Kupersmith's bass sound stays oddly, unfashionably low."

Rex Butters of All About Jazz wrote that Slon has "heated high speed interplay and cold techno ice caps" and calls the musicians "gifted improvisers at the top of their game". In CMJ New Music Report, Tad Hendrickson wrote that the production by Bundy K. Brown "helps bring the album into sharper focus" and calls the work "nicely done".

Pitchfork's Mark Richardson noted: "although the Trio operate within a smaller sphere than many of their contemporaries, they remain open to possibility and produce inspired combinations of seemingly different sounds-- and the economical and engaging Slon is evidence that they're on to something." Brian Baker of Paste called the musicians "phenomenal jazz talents interested in technological possibilities... as well as jazz's venerable heritage," and called the recording "an album of power, vision and conviction."

John Schacht listed the album as one of his top twenty favorite albums of 2004 in Creative Loafing, calling the combo "the best jazz ensemble many jazz fans have never heard".

== Track listing ==
All tracks written by the Chicago Underground Trio

1. "Protest" (6:29)
2. "Slon" (4:56)
3. "Zagreb" (6:39)
4. "Sevens" (3:00)
5. "Campbell" (6:57)
6. "Kite" (4:35)
7. "Palermo" (3:20)
8. "Shoe Lace" (4:32)
9. "Pear" (3:02)

== Credits ==
- Rob Mazurek – cornet, computers
- Noel Kupersmith – bass, computers
- Chad Taylor – drums
- Bundy K. Brown – engineer, mixing, producer
- Sheila Sachs – design
- Bill Skibbe – tape splicing

== Chart performance ==
Year	Chart	Peak
2004	CMJ Top 75	70
2004	CMJ Jazz Albums	6
