= Tom Abbs =

- Born: 1972 (age 53–54); Seattle, Washington
- Genres: Avant-garde jazz
- Occupation: Musician
- Instruments: Double bass, tuba, cello, violin, didgeridoo, flute
- Labels: ESP-Disk, Northern Spy

Tom Abbs (born 1972) is an American multi-instrumentalist and filmmaker. He works primarily in jazz, free jazz, and free improvisation, and plays double bass, tuba, cello, violin, didgeridoo, and wooden flute, often playing several instruments simultaneously.

== Career ==
A native of Seattle, Washington, Abbs attended The New School, studying with Reggie Workman, Buster Williams, Joe Chambers, Brian Smith, Junior Mance, Arnie Lawrence, Chico Hamilton, and Arthur Taylor. He began his performing career in 1992.

He has worked with Lawrence "Butch" Morris, Charles Gayle, Daniel Carter, Cooper-Moore, Steve Swell, Roy Campbell, Jr., Sabir Mateen, Ori Kaplan, Jemeel Moondoc, Assif Tsahar, Borah Bergman, Billy Bang, Andrew Lamb, and Warren Smith. Abbs is a member of Triptych Myth, Yuganaut, and Transmitting (with Napoleon Maddox and Jane LeCroy). He leads the band Frequency Response and tours with his solo multimedia act Multifarious. He has collaborated with the painter M. P. Landis.

Abbs is the founder of the arts coalition Jump Arts, which presented performances and workshops throughout New York City from 1997 to 2002.

He was the general manager of ESP-Disk from 2007 to 2010 and founded Northern Spy Records which he co-owns with Adam Downey.

== Discography ==
=== As leader ===
- Conscription (CIMP, 2003) (& Frequency Response)
- The Animated Adventures of Knox (482 Music, 2006) (& Frequency Response)
- Live at the Marquise Dance Hall (Small Doses, 2008)
- Lost and Found (Engine Studios, 2009) (& Frequency Response)
- Hawthorne (Engine Studios, 2018) (& Frequency Response)

=== As sideman ===
- Active Ingredients (Chad Taylor, Jemeel Moondoc, Steve Swell, Abbs), Titration (Delmark, 2002 [2003])
- Yuganaut, Yuganaut (Not On Label, 2005)
- Yuganaut, This Musicship (ESP, 2005 [2008])
- Yuganaut, Sharks (Engine Studios, 2010)
- Daniel Carter, The Perfect Blue (Not Two, 2010)
- Roscoe Mitchell, Four Ways (Nessa, 2017) (w Yuganaut)
- Andrew Lamb, Rhapsody in Black (NoBusiness Recs, 2012)
- Andrew Lamb, The Cabash Of Love (Birdwatcher Recs, 2018)
- The Icebergs, Add Vice (Birdwatcher Recs, 2018)
