= The Daily Biological =

Studio album by Chad Taylor Trio
- Released: 2020
- Recorded: August 9, 2019; September 18, 2019
- Studio: Park West Studios, Brooklyn, New York
- Genre: Jazz
- Label: Cuneiform; Rune 467

Chad Taylor chronology
Myths and Morals (2018)	The Daily Biological (2020)	The Reel (2022)

The Daily Biological is an album by the Chad Taylor Trio, led by drummer Taylor, and featuring saxophonist Brian Settles and pianist Neil Podgurski. It was recorded on August 9, 2019, and September 18, 2019, at Park West Studios in Brooklyn, New York, and was released in 2020 by Cuneiform Records.

== Reception ==
Professional ratings
Review scores
Source	Rating
All About Jazz	4/5 stars
PopMatters	8/10 stars
Tom Hull – on the Web	A−

Steve Futterman of The New Yorker called Taylor "resourceful and responsive as ever," while describing Settles and Podgurski as "two players who share his inclination and ability to shift easily from serenity to improvisational fervor." He wrote: "The trio's animated interplay commands attention throughout the set, but the concluding piece, 'Between Sound and Silence,' is a most satisfying endgame: a carefully modulated and, in its hymnlike conclusion, poignant exchange among shrewd individualists who cohere as a band."

NPR Music's Kevin Whitehead stated: "I like the tough sound of this unit, partly due to a slightly odd lineup. There's no bass instrument, which throws off typical ensemble balance, but it opens up possibilities for different ways to kick the rhythm along facilitated by the tunes the players write... This college reunion is a happy one. The good vibrations radiate out from the drum stool." The album was also featured in NPR's 2020 Jazz Critics Poll.

Will Layman of PopMatters commented: "the outward flying energy of the Chad Taylor Trio on this recording is a fresh joy... The Daily Biological, stripped down to this nimble power trio, goes wherever it wants to go, wherever the music takes it. Fun but heady, it's the kind of stuff to sustain you all day long."

Writing for The Washington Post, Chris Richards noted that Settles "blows warm gusts of melody through the band's geometric arrangements to dazzling effect," and remarked: "There's a lot to love on this album, but don't miss the discreet, stocktaking sax solo during 'Swamp,' a Settles composition presumably aimed at those who only see his hometown as a political quagmire."

In a review for Point of Departure, Troy Collins wrote: "The trio's coiled interplay commands attention throughout the set, but the group also excels at minimalism... No one record easily encapsulates Taylor's wide-ranging artistry. With Podgurski and Settles by his side however, The Daily Biological covers a lot of fertile ground, making this a most promising debut for the Chad Taylor Trio."

Exposé Online's Jan Davis stated: "The three players work together admirably, presenting often angular melodies very lyrically. I'm often reminded of the kind of awkward intervals that Thelonious Monk was prone to, with unusual phrasing... The Daily Biological is a very enjoyable set of slightly-avant jazz that's accessible enough for most jazz fans but adventurous enough to please those who lean to the more unpredictable side."

S. Victor Aaron of Something Else! commented: "With all the shades of progressive music that Chad Taylor thrives in, no record of his is going to do more than scratch the surface of his artistry. With Neil Podgurski and Brian Settles by his side, The Daily Biological does cover a lot of that fertile ground, though."

Writing for Marlbank, Stephen Graham remarked: "Taylor... is very impressive throughout and maintains a loose feel that is welcoming but not at all lazy. I wouldn't say this is a groove record but it has a head bobbing intensity to it but is no way just wild futile anarchy... Worth wrapping your weary ears around more than a few times."

== Track listing ==
1. "The Shepherd" (Brian Settles) – 5:43
2. "Prism" (Neil Podgurski) – 5:09
3. "Swamp" (Brian Settles) – 7:20
4. "Resistance" (Neil Podgurski) – 6:58
5. "Matape" (Chad Taylor) – 6:09
6. "Birds, Leaves, Wind, Trees" (Neil Podgurski) – 8:42
7. "Untethered" (Neil Podgurski) – 5:23
8. "Recife" (Chad Taylor) – 2:47
9. "Between Sound and Silence" (Chad Taylor) – 12:10

== Personnel ==
- Chad Taylor – Drums
- Brian Settles – Tenor saxophone
- Neil Podgurski – Piano
