= Synesthesia (Chicago Underground Duo album) =

Studio album by Chicago Underground Duo
- Released: May 2, 2000
- Recorded: September – November, 1999
- Studios: Electrical Audio Recording, Chicago, IL
- Genre: Jazz
- Length: 40:38
- Labels: Thrill Jockey thrill 077

Chicago Underground Duo chronology
12° of Freedom (1998)	Synesthesia (2000)	Axis and Alignment (2002)

Rob Mazurek chronology
Flamethrower (2000)	Synesthesia (2000)	Who Stole the I Walkman? (2000)

Synesthesia is an album by Chicago Underground Duo which was recorded in 1999 and released on the Delmark label the following year.

== Reception ==
Professional ratings
Review scores
Source	Rating
Allmusic	4/5 stars
Pitchfork	7.8/10

In his review for AllMusic, Ken Taylor states: "Though the Chicago Underground Duo is hypnotically minimal in its aesthetic, Rob Mazurek and Chad Taylor still make a lot of noise. On Synesthesia, the duo combines elements of Miles Davis' Bitches Brew-era fusion with a futuristic, technological sensibility that could only come out of Chicago. ... Synesthesia brings out the brilliance of Taylor and Mazurek's sparse instrumentation as, for the most part, they use only a cornet, a keyboard, and drums to weave their plaintive and complex compositions. Mazurek's trumpeting skill is impeccable and his experimentation with Synesthesia's rhythm structures is mindblowing as he switches from totally free jazz, to hard bop, to acid jazz at the drop of a hat. Certainly, the lack of other instruments in the mix makes for a grand space to showcase both Mazurek's and Taylor's talents. With Synesthesia, the Chicago Underground Duo provides a strong link between experimental avant-garde jazz and jazz-flecked electronic music. A very provocative and beautiful record".

Pitchfork's Mat LeMay called it "a thoroughly enjoyable record, at times reaching even beyond that" but noted "Unfortunately, Mazurek's electronic wizardry doesn't always couple well with Taylor's more traditional free jazz stylings" conceding that "The more adventurous passages obviously spring from the able mind of Mazurek, whereas Taylor's portion consists of extended forays into free jazz, complete with wanky drum solos ... For a record with such startling and emphatic dynamics changes, the better portions of Synesthesia are remarkably smooth ... Mazurek seems to be chipping away at band members and, in doing so, bringing his own unique brand of genre-twisting, rock-influenced electronic jazz into focus. With Synesthesia, Mazurek proves once and for all that he's more than just an ace horn player".

On All About Jazz Derek John stated "A magnificent example of what happens when open-minded musicians realize the full potential of jazz in the present tense, Synesthesia, contrary to the word's connotations, could, in fact, be the reawakening of the rebirth of cool".

In JazzTimes Christopher Porter noted "While the CD features some unique soundscapes, and its appeal increases immensely with repeated listens, it’s one of the lesser titles in the group’s ever-expanding catalog ... Synesthesia’s vibe is more of a studio-composed experiment that relies on overdubs and the layering of Taylor’s vibraphones and Mazurek’s electronically manipulated cornet and keyboard squiggles to make its bed of sound, which often recalls Miles Davis during the abstract-ambient parts of Get Up with It".

== Track listing ==
All compositions by Rob Mazurek and Chad Taylor except where noted

1. "Blue Sparks from Her, and the Scent of Lightning" (Mazurek, Taylor / Agustin Barrios Mangoré) − 12:02
2. "Threads on the Face" − 5:26
3. "Bellatron" − 2:55
4. "Red Gradations" − 2:50
5. "Fluxus" − 4:48
6. "Labyrinth" − 7:26
7. "The Unique Container" − 2:24
8. "Tram Transfer Nine" (Mazurek, Taylor, John McIntyre) − 2:47

== Personnel ==
- Rob Mazurek – cornet, electronics, found sound
- Chad Taylor – percussion, vibraphone
- Sam Prekop − Moog synthesizer (track 5)
- Douglas McCombs − bass six (track 8)
- Noel Kupersmith − bass (track 8)
- Casey Rice − electronics (track 8)
