= Circle Down =

Studio album by Chad Taylor
- Released: 2009
- Recorded: December 20, 2008
- Studio: Systems Two, Brooklyn, New York
- Genre: Free improvisation
- Length: 52:44
- Label: 482 Music; 482-1065

Chad Taylor chronology
Titration (2003)	Circle Down (2009)	Myths and Morals (2018)

Circle Down is an album by drummer Chad Taylor. It was recorded on December 20, 2008, at Systems Two in Brooklyn, New York, and was released in 2009 by 482 Music. On the album, Taylor is joined by pianist Angelica Sanchez and double bassist Chris Lightcap.

== Reception ==
Professional ratings
Review scores
Source	Rating
All About Jazz	4.5/5 stars
All About Jazz	4/5 stars
AllMusic	4.5/5 stars
The Free Jazz Collective	3/5 stars
Tom Hull – on the Web	B+

In a review for AllMusic, Michael G. Nastos called the album "a beautiful statement of modern jazz music played with attractive melodic content," and wrote: "Every selection is finely crafted and thoughtfully performed, and it is rare that any modern jazz effort is so satisfying from start to finish. What is even more remarkable is that there is no wasted motion, no histrionics or grandstanding, as pure emotion is translated to superlative music making on this most highly recommended recording, one for the ages."

Jim Macnie of The Village Voice stated: "the drummer's got his ear deeply tuned into the personality of the music at hand... This trio's ideas spill forward, even when a measured approach is in play. That gives bassist Chris Lightcap and pianist Angelica Sanchez a genuinely unusual momentum to milk."

Point of Departure's Ed Hazell commented: "Everyone in the trio has a distinctive sound and approach and they consistently find surprising ways to work together. They respond to one another with warmth and enthusiasm, and they like to see in how many directions they can tip the balance among them. This is a group that's obviously happy to be working together, the joy and daring they inspire in one another is heard on every track."

Writing for All About Jazz, Mark F. Turner remarked: "The ten compositions are cerebral and kinetic, yet thoroughly engaging, as the trio moves with symbiotic precision—countering and interacting with one another as the electricity flows... There are some recordings that just sparkle with energy and Taylor's Circle Down is one of them. AAJ's Troy Collins wrote: "Providing a cohesive sensibility to the proceedings, the trio offers subtle shifts in approach with each stylistic change. Their congenial rapport informs their intertwining discourse, yielding unconventional arrangements that keep solo orders and accompaniment unpredictable and fresh." AAJ writer David Adler stated: "it takes a few listens for the elusive beauty and structural integrity of the 10 tracks to sink in... It could be that the Circle Down trio is a cousin to Sticks & Stones, Taylor's co-led unit with Matana Roberts and Josh Abrams, although Sanchez gives this new material a broader harmonic signature—meticulously voiced, precise yet impulsive."

Stef Gijssels of The Free Jazz Collective commented: "Great piano playing. Excellent rhythm section. Some post-bop, some Latin even. Nice. Sweet."

== Track listing ==
1. "Box Step" (Chris Lightcap) – 5:59
2. "Specifica" (Chris Lightcap) – 4:38
3. "Rock" (Angelica Sanchez) – 8:18
4. "Traipse" (Chris Lightcap) – 5:40
5. "No Brainer" (Angelica Sanchez) – 5:15
6. "Opal" (Chad Taylor) – 4:25
7. "Level" (Chad Taylor) – 4:32
8. "Miriam" (Chad Taylor) – 2:36
9. "Pablo" (Chad Taylor) – 6:24
10. "Pascal" (Chad Taylor) – 4:57

== Personnel ==
- Chad Taylor – drums
- Angelica Sanchez – piano
- Chris Lightcap – double bass
