= In Praise of Shadows (album) =

Studio album by Chicago Underground Duo
- Released: 2006
- Recorded: August 2005
- Studio: Soma Electronic Music Studios, Chicago
- Genre: Free jazz
- Label: Thrill Jockey; 168

Chicago Underground Duo chronology
Axis and Alignment (2002)	In Praise of Shadows (2006)	Boca Negra (2010)

In Praise of Shadows is an album by the Chicago Underground Duo, featuring multi-instrumentalists Rob Mazurek and Chad Taylor. It was recorded during August 2005 at Soma Electronic Music Studios in Chicago, and was released in 2006 by the Thrill Jockey label.

== Reception ==
Professional ratings
Review scores
Source	Rating
AllMusic	3/5 stars
All About Jazz	4/5 stars
All About Jazz	4.5/5 stars
PopMatters	7/10 stars
Pitchfork	6.7/10 stars
Tiny Mix Tapes	4/5 stars

In a review for AllMusic, Thom Jurek called the album "an adventurous, multi-textured series of sonic explorations that exist between the worlds of experimental music -- jazz, free and structured improvisation, and conceptual music." He wrote: "In Praise of Shadows is a provocative and rewarding listening experience that will take any listener brave and patient enough to give it a fair shake on a musical journey unlike any other."

Dave Segal of JazzTimes stated: "Shadows is an acquired taste, but if you value challenging music, it's one worth cultivating."

Writing for All About Jazz, Nathan Haselby commented: "In Praise of Shadows is an advance both musically and conceptually for the Chicago Underground Duo. Their sheer range of sounds has always been impressive, and without sacrificing stylistic breadth, they have created an album of impressive coherence." AAJ's Troy Collins described the album as the group's "most stylistically varied and sonically dense recording," and remarked: "In Praise of Shadows represents a marked step forward for the duo. Using an expanded instrumental arsenal and a variety of stylistic approaches, they have opened a new chapter in their discography. With a decade worth of albums to their credit under the banner of the Chicago Underground, Mazurek and Taylor prove they have plenty of room left to explore with this project."

In an article for PopMatters, Scott Hreha called the album "Mazurek and Taylor's strongest statement to date in the Duo configuration," and stated that Mazurek "remains unafraid of space in either his composed or improvised material; one gets the impression that even seemingly random note choices and placements are made with great precision and deliberation, often allowing the listener plenty of room to digest the overall contours of the music."

A reviewer for Pitchfork noted that the album "feels like a suite, at least in the sense that each track has a single function," and singled out "The Glass House" for praise, writing that it "envelops you like... a garden of endless, hanging sculptures."

Lars Gotrich of Tiny Mix Tapes commented: "In Praise of Shadows continues the Duo's metamorphosis, but holistically extends the idea into a more pure form of textural ambience... [it] will be one of the most fully realized concepts, visually or aurally, jazz or ambient, you hear in 2006."

Dusted Magazine's Bill Meyer remarked: "The music's language, originally a two-sided coin of Don Cherry-steeped free jazz excursions and minimalist-inspired compositions, has been filtered through various genre explorations and the input of other players... In Praise Of Shadows works not only as a solid effort on its own, but as a rewarding recent chapter in an ongoing creative dialogue."

== Track listing ==
1. "Falling Awake" – 2:59
2. "In Praise of Shadows" – 12:19
3. "The Glass House" – 9:00
4. "Cities Without Citadels" – 2:47
5. "Pangea" – 8:25
6. "Funeral of Dreams" – 6:20
7. "The Light In Between" – 3:25

== Personnel ==
- Rob Mazurek – cornet, organ, celeste, piano, prepared piano, harpsichord, noise box, Moogerfooger analog delay, ring modulator
- Chad Taylor – drums, cymbals, mbira, gongs, percussion, vibraphone, prepared vibraphone
