= Shed Grace =

Studio album by Sticks and Stones (Matana Roberts, Josh Abrams, and Chad Taylor)
- Released: 2004
- Recorded: February 4, 2003; October 28, 2003
- Studios: Semaphore Recording, Chicago, Illinois
- Genre: Free jazz
- Length: 50:17
- Labels: Thrill Jockey; Thrill140
- Producer: Vijay Iyer

Sticks and Stones chronology
Sticks and Stones (2002)	Shed Grace (2004)

Shed Grace is the second album by the collaborative free jazz trio Sticks and Stones, featuring saxophonist Matana Roberts, double bassist Josh Abrams, and drummer Chad Taylor. It was recorded during 2003, with no overdubs or edits, at Semaphore Recording in Chicago, Illinois, and was released in 2004 by the Thrill Jockey label. The music consists of original compositions by each player, plus three covers.

== Reception ==
Professional ratings
Review scores
Source	Rating
AllMusic	4/5 stars
Tom Hull – on the Web	B

In a review for AllMusic, Sean Westergaard wrote: "This is a democratic band to be sure, but it is Matana Roberts' clear, pure tone on alto and clarinet, and unshakeable lyricism, that really stand out. With the recent passing of some of the AACM's old guard, it's good to see that the organization has some very talented young members to keep the flame lit. Well done."

Peter Marsh of the BBC stated: "it's clear from the outset that this is a band with a lot of playing under their belts... Roberts is a fluid, elegant player who rejects the star soloist approach of many a saxophonist faced with the trio format. Her empathy with Abrams and Taylor results in a genuine trio music."

Exclaim!'s John Goodman commented: "Each musician has an equal voice in the ensemble, which veers towards freedom while deferring to tradition... While the trio remain mostly inside the jazz tradition they bring in other frames of reference at every opportunity."

Writing for the CMJ New Music Report, Tad Hendrickson remarked: "it's obvious that the players have developed an often-gentle language of their own. No screeching or hyperbole - the acoustic band plays warm organic avant-garde that smolders with a moody yet outward-leaning vision."

David Adler of All About Jazz called the album a "fine set" "driven by free invention, filtered through democratic exchange," and stated that the musicians "speak the language of free jazz but contend with an array of influences." AAJ's Mark Corroto described the group as "the most patient young band playing music today," noting that "where others would wail and rip through the minimally free music they create, the patient S&S slowly develop their themes." He wrote: "They leave plenty of room in each of the tracks heard here for the flavor of each instrument and player to be heard, really heard. Nothing is rushed here."

In an article for Dusted Magazine, Derek Taylor commented: "This trio's handle is a fitting encapsulation of their materials and approach. Adopting what has become the most rudimentary and workaday configuration in creative improvised music... these three players still manage to create something fresh and personal."

JazzWord's Ken Waxman described the album as "a major step forward" and "a valuable listen to seek out," and stated that "Sticks & Stones has graduated to a higher plane after more than five years of apprenticeship."

== Track listing ==
Track timings not provided.

1. "Shed Grace" (Josh Abrams)
2. "The Refusal" (Josh Abrams)
3. "Wordful" (Chad Taylor)
4. "Skippy" (Thelonious Monk)
5. "Veatrice" (Matana Roberts)
6. "So Very Cold" (Josh Abrams)
7. "Colonial Mentality" (Fela Kuti)
8. "Wonder Twins" (Chad Taylor)
9. "Ishfahan" (Billy Strayhorn)
10. "430" (Matana Roberts)

== Personnel ==
- Matana Roberts – alto saxophone, clarinet, percussion
- Josh Abrams – double bass, percussion
- Chad Taylor – drums, percussion
