= A Night Walking Through Mirrors =

Live album by Chicago/London Underground
- Released: 2017
- Recorded: April 21, 2016
- Venue: Cafe Oto, London
- Genre: Free jazz
- Length: 1:19:53
- Label: Cuneiform; RUNE428
- Producer: Rob Mazurek

A Night Walking Through Mirrors is a live album by the Chicago/London Underground, pairing two Americans, trumpeter Rob Mazurek and drummer Chad Taylor, with two British musicians, pianist Alexander Hawkins and bassist John Edwards. It was recorded on April 21, 2016, at Cafe Oto in London, and was released in 2017 by Cuneiform Records.

The recording came about when Mazurek and Taylor of the Chicago Underground Duo suggested that Hawkins and Edwards join them in order to celebrate the occasion of the pair's 20th anniversary as a duo. When asked about his criteria for inviting other musicians to participate in such collaborations, Mazurek stated that he seeks "people who are completely open to anything, no matter how outlandish or crazy the idea is. They just have to be 100 percent into the moment and what we're doing." Regarding the album title, he commented: "It really felt like we would be playing and somebody would take a left turn and we'd be in another dimension... Another person would take a right turn and we'd be in yet another dimension, but everybody was right there. It really did feel like a night spent walking through mirrors in that respect."

== Reception ==
Professional ratings
Review scores
Source	Rating
DownBeat	4.5/5 stars
PopMatters	8/10 stars
Jazzwise	4/5 stars
Tom Hull – on the Web	A−
All About Jazz	4.5/5 stars
All About Jazz	4.5/5 stars
All About Jazz	4/5 stars

In a review for DownBeat, Bill Meyer wrote: "this record is a mostly improvised live encounter that manages to sustain a robust forward momentum, even though there are multiple conversations happening at any moment... [it] is less about arriving at any location than it is about an ongoing process of engagement, rupture and rapprochement, where the moments continually are broken and assembled anew."

John Garratt of PopMatters stated: "Mazurek and Taylor have tapped into a sub-genre where technology compliments the feeling of liberation rather than spoils it. The more receptive you are to their tweakings, the more satisfying this album will be."

Writing for Jazzwise, Daniel Spicer commented: "As you'd expect, the two British serial-collaborators fit right in... helping to create a dense, episodic experience that moves through moments of tense abstraction and brooding darkness to fierce, roiling tumult."

JazzTimes's Mike Shanley noted the "deep connections among the four" musicians, and remarked: "Clearly this was a meeting of kindred spirits, which hopefully will happen again before long."

In an article for Stereogum, Phil Freeman wrote: "The music is loud — Edwards attacks his bass like no one I've ever heard, and Mazurek feeds his cornet through an array of pedals, turning notes into smears and echoing sputters, as Hawkins and Taylor work in a free jazz mode, battering the keys and the skins without mercy. But it's also thoughtful; everyone is listening to everyone else, and knows when to drop out and let an individual voice cut through and be heard."

Karl Ackermann of All About Jazz stated: "As the title implies, there is a ghostly quality to the music, even as it imposes alternately raw and supple emotions. At the heart of ear-bending configurations the sound remains self-assured and expressive; the life of the music resides in the larger world, where ego is left behind." AAJ's Barry Witherden commented: "this is music that feels like it could shake foundations. Scarily spooky one minute, scarily overwhelming the next, it'll then catch you by surprise with episodes of delicacy and reflection." Glenn Astarita remarked: "these prominent improvisers and progressive jazz laureates execute a surfeit of soul-jarring motifs, spiced with off-center EFX articulations and fractured segments amid a horde of protracted developments and synergistic improv... the musicians operate within multifarious frameworks much to the delight of the revved-up audience."

Writing for Point of Departure, Greg Buium called the album "exceptional," and noted: "This isn't fun house stuff. Here, the mirrors might be more akin to something surreal, out of a Dali or a Miró; or maybe an experiment in science, refractions of shapes and light. It is one of the finest records I've heard this year."

Nilan Perera of Exclaim! stated that the album is "at once well executed and somewhat nostalgic," and wrote: "There are some amazing moments in this set."

== Track listing ==
1. "A Night Spent Walking Through Mirrors" – 24:17
2. "Something Must Happen" – 15:22
3. "Boss Redux" – 21:31
4. "Mysteries of Emanating Light" – 18:43

== Personnel ==
- Rob Mazurek – cornet, sampler, electronics, voice
- Chad Taylor – drums, mbira, electronics
- Alexander Hawkins – piano
- John Edwards – double bass
