= Andrew Lamb (musician) =

- Born: August 26, 1958 (age 68); Clinton, North Carolina, US
- Origin: New York City
- Instruments: Saxophone, flute
- Years active: 1970s–present
- Labels: Delmark, CIMP

Andrew Lamb (born August 26, 1958, Clinton, North Carolina) is a jazz saxophonist and flautist. Lamb was raised in Chicago and South Jamaica, Queens. Having studied with AACM charter member Kalaparusha Maurice McIntyre, Lamb came into New York City's avant-garde community during the 1970s, becoming an active presence in the Bedford-Stuyvesant arts world and winning a Brooklyn Arts Council grant.

In 1994, he led a session for Delmark, composing all the pieces on Portrait in the Mist, which featured vibraphonist Warren Smith, bassist Wilber Morris, and drummer Andrei Strobert. Lamb has since recorded duets with Warren Smith (Duet, WISland, 1999, and Dance of the Prophet), made a trio recording with Eugene Cooper and Andrei Strobert (Kiki Records), and in 2003 released Pilgrimage on CIMP with Tom Abbs and Andrei Strobert, as well as a later release with his group The Moving Form, Year of the Endless Moment (Engine Studios). Lamb has also recorded with Henry Grimes’s Sublime Communication trio Live from WKCR (2004) and Live at Edgefest in Ann Arbor (2005), both on the JazzNewYork Productions label.

Andrew Lamb and his own ensembles remain a regular presence in the New York area, and have frequently performed at the annual Vision Festival since 1996. Lamb has been part of Alan Silva's big band project, the Sound Visions Orchestra, and has also been a member of the Cecil Taylor big band. In 2005, Lamb played in the Sublime Communication trio in Berlin and in the Henry Grimes Quartet with Marshall Allen and Hamid Drake at the tenth annual Vision Festival, and he has also toured with the Grimes-led quartet Spaceship on the Highway. Steven Loewy of Allmusic writes that Andrew Lamb is "a serious musician seeking to uplift his soul through art, and, like John Coltrane and his progeny, Lamb's vehicle is the psalm-like expression of his tenor saxophone. The results reflect his quest, testifying to his musical abilities, enormous potential, and depth of character."

== Discography ==
=== As leader ===
- 1994 - Portrait in the Mist (Delmark, 1995) (Quartet)
- 2003 - The Pilgrimage (CIMP Records) (Trio)
- 2005 - New Orleans Suite (Engine Studios, r2010)
- 2012 - Rhapsody in Black (NoBusiness Recs)
- 2018 - The Casbah Of Love (Birdwatcher Records) (Trio)
