= Flamethrower (album) =

Studio album by Chicago Underground Trio
- Released: August 15, 2000
- Recorded: March 11, 12 & 13, 2000
- Studio: Riverside Studio, Chicago, IL
- Genre: Jazz
- Length: 65:00
- Label: Delmark; DE-521
- Producer: Steve Krasinsky, Rob Mazurek, Chad Taylor, Noel Kupersmith, Bundy K. Brown

Chicago Underground Trio chronology
| Possible Cube (1999) | Flamethrower (2000) | Slon (2004) |

Rob Mazurek chronology
| Commander Mindfuck Designer (1999) | Flamethrower (2000) | Synesthesia (2000) |

Flamethrower is an album by Chicago Underground Trio which was recorded in 2000 and released on the Delmark label.

== Reception ==
Professional ratings
Review scores
| Source | Rating |
|---|---|
| AllMusic | 3/5 stars |

In his review for AllMusic, Alex Henderson states: "Flamethrower is a generally enjoyable, if imperfect, avant-garde jazz date. Outside playing is dominant, and the influence of Chicago's AACM is strong throughout the CD. ... This isn't an album that one can easily absorb on the first listen, but after playing Flamethrower several times, the listener finds more and more to like about this music. Despite its imperfections, Flamethrower is worth picking up if you're an admirer of AACM-style jazz".

Christopher Porter of JazzTimes wrote: "Flamethrower demonstrates the Underground at its cerebral best: free-floating, quietly melodic, modal-based jazz... While his broad tone doesn't recall Miles Davis' pinched sound, Mazurek does share with the Prince of Darkness a fondness for sad melodies and electronics: Interludes using electronic tonalities separate some of Flamethrower's tunes."

Writing for All About Jazz, Derek Taylor commented: "the interplay here between the four players often operates at peak levels. Mazurek's ferrous cornet negotiates tightly packed ensemble sections and skeletally spaced solo interludes with equal facility... Each member of the group seems equally adept alone or in concert." Another AAJ reviewer remarked: "Flamethrower is creative work at the edge of the in & out continuum—music that requires the listener to pay attention and participate."

In an article for One Final Note, Scott Hreha wrote: "Flamethrower is an excellent disc from start to finish. Though they ought to be careful—a few more recordings like this one and the 'Underground' of their name will shift from accuracy to irony."

== Track listing ==
All compositions by Chicago Underground Trio except where noted

1. "Quail" (Rob Mazurek) − 4:43
2. "Fahrenheit 451" − 1:56
3. "Warm Marsh" (Mazurek) − 5:40
4. "Antiquity" − 5:07
5. "Flamethrower" (Jeff Parker) − 2:33
6. "Woman in Motion" (Mazurek) − 6:16
7. "Triceptikon" − 3:02
8. "A Lesson Earned" (Chad Taylor) − 8:51
9. "Arcweld" (Mazurek) − 2:10
10. "Elroy" (Parker) − 0:47
11. "Number 19" − 11:21
12. "504" (Noel Kupersmith) − 2:17
13. "The Tungflec Treaty" − 5:25
14. "The World Has Changed" − 3:20
15. "Elray" (Parker) − 1:00

== Personnel ==
- Rob Mazurek – cornet, electronics
- Noel Kupersmith – bass fiddle, electronics
- Chad Taylor – percussion
- Jeff Parker – guitar, electronics
