= Boca Negra =

Studio album by Chicago Underground Duo
- Released: 2010
- Recorded: May 2009
- Studio: El Rocha Studios, Sao Paulo, Brazil
- Genre: Free jazz
- Label: Thrill Jockey; 228
- Producer: Matthew Lux

Chicago Underground Duo chronology
In Praise of Shadows (2006)	Boca Negra (2010)	Age of Energy (2012)

Boca Negra is an album by the Chicago Underground Duo, featuring multi-instrumentalists Rob Mazurek and Chad Taylor. It was recorded during May 2009 at El Rocha Studios in São Paulo, Brazil, and was released in 2010 by the Thrill Jockey label.

The album title means "black mouth," a term that originates in Tenerife, Canary Islands, and that refers to both an endless intake of information and the mouth of the volcano Teide.

== Reception ==
Professional ratings
Aggregate scores
Source	Rating
Metacritic	81/100
Review scores
Source	Rating
AllMusic	4/5 stars
All About Jazz	4.5/5 stars
Cokemachineglow	84%
Drowned in Sound	7/10
PopMatters	8/10
Tiny Mix Tapes	3.5/5 stars

In a review for AllMusic, Thom Jurek wrote: "Boca Negra is the most sophisticated and improvisationally complex recording CUD has ever recorded, while easily being its most accessible."

A reviewer for The Free Jazz Collective called the album "fantastic," and stated: "The two musicians do not shy away from complexity... although the entire album is quite accessible and very rhythmic. It all sounds simple, but it isn't... the whole thing full of creative inventiveness, but above all, Mazurek's excellent playing of the cornet and Chad Taylor's excellent drumming. And a great production by Matt Lux. Highly recommended."

Chris May of All About Jazz described the album as "a delight to get lost in," and commented: "Boca Negra explores dualities and the tensions which exist between them. Composed vs improvised music. Visceral grooves vs ambient soundscapes. Folkish simplicity vs polyrhythmic sophistication. High energy rock outs vs gentle balladeering. Reiterative ostinatos, riffs and motifs vs freewheeling improvisation. The yin and yang of creative, collaborative music making." AAJ's David Adler remarked: "Boca Negra finds Mazurek and Taylor wearing their multi-instrumentalist hats and tweaking their interplay with electronic enhancements, plotting out music of small gestures and bold, emphatic outbursts... there's a judicious balance of free acoustic blowing..., calming aural expanses..., dub and electronica references... and surging asymmetric rhythm."

Writing for PopMatters, John Garratt noted: "Some purists may wonder if this extraordinary music is really jazz, but at its weird and wonderful heart, Boca Negra belongs to the tradition of Sun Ra, Miles Davis' Bitches Brew and other fine jazz works from that weird and wonderful tradition."

A reviewer for Tiny Mix Tapes wrote: "This record exists out on its own, in time as well as in space. It is no longer American, but not even remotely Brazilian; it lies somewhere in between a half-remembered past and a shadowy future."

S. Victor Aaron of Something Else! stated: "This is a great outing for the Duo... It's spacey, spacious, and alternately jagged and milky... For a whack jazz record that uses a lot of strange noises and unconventional concepts, Boca Negra is also somehow accessible, too. One of the better releases to come out of Chicago's thriving experimental scene all year."

Exclaim!'s David Dacks commented: "This album is the first in a few years for Chicago Underground, but the time off has only intensified the communication between Rob Mazurek and Chad Taylor... Welcome back, guys."

A writer for Treble remarked: "Underneath the admittedly difficult surface of... Boca Negra, lies a radiating being, a pure and jazzy essence that cordially grants access to listeners who wish for it... Their music... offers an approach that is monitored yet frenzied. This is the very music that acid jazz should strive to define."

== Track listing ==
1. "Green Ants" (Rob Mazurek) – 7:08
2. "Left Hand of Darkness" (Rob Mazurek) – 4:26
3. "Broken Shadows" (Ornette Coleman) – 7:24
4. "Quantum Eye" (Rob Mazurek) – 4:41
5. "Confliction" (Chad Taylor) – 6:23
6. "Hermeto" (Chad Taylor) – 4:40
7. "Spy on the Floor" (Rob Mazurek) – 6:39
8. "Laughing With the Sun" (Rob Mazurek) – 5:25
9. "Roots and Shooting Stars" (Chad Taylor) – 4:08
10. "Vergence" (Chad Taylor) – 4:55

== Personnel ==
- Rob Mazurek – cornet, electronics
- Chad Taylor – drums, electronics, marimba, vibraphone, mbira, computer
