= Chicago Underground (jazz ensemble) =

American avant-garde jazz ensemble

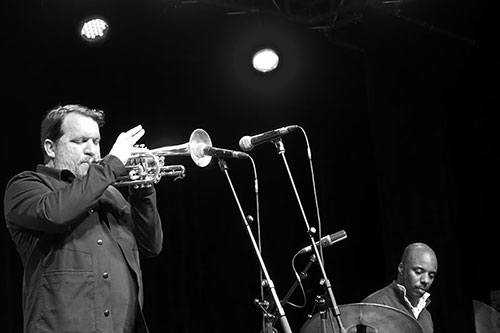
Chicago Underground Duo in Aarhus, Denmark 2015

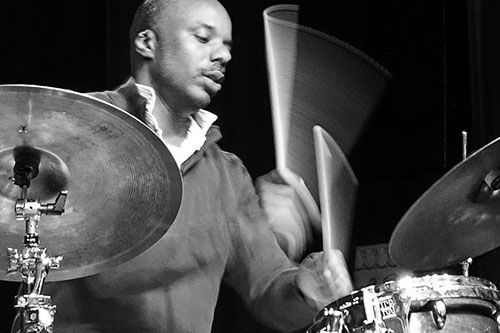
Chad Taylor 2015

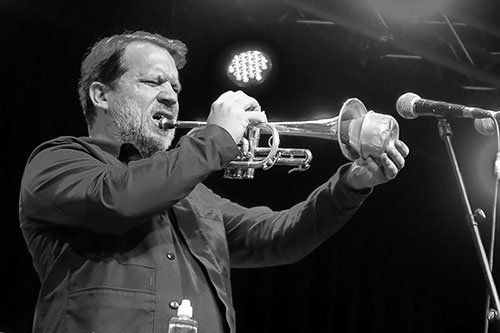
Rob Mazurek 2015

Chicago Underground is an avant-garde jazz ensemble formed in Chicago in 1997 based around the core duo of cornetist Rob Mazurek and drummer/percussionist Chad Taylor. They have recorded and performed as the Chicago Underground Duo, Trio, Quartet or Orchestra depending on how many additional musicians are included. The ensemble has released numerous recordings on the Thrill Jockey and Delmark labels.

== Rob Mazurek / Chad Taylor ==
Rob Mazurek was born in Jersey City, New Jersey in 1965, and played trumpet and cornet in high school. After high school he attended the Bloom School of Jazz in Chicago, and began playing gigs with local jazz musicians.

In 1996, Mazurek founded a workshop at Chicago jazz club The Green Mill called Chicago Underground for the performance of avant-garde, improvisatory jazz. By 1998, a new ensemble had formed around this idea, featuring guitarist Jeff Parker, drummer Chad Taylor, bassist Noel Kupersmith, and trombonist Sara Smith. After this ensemble released an album on Chicago's Delmark Records as the Chicago Underground Orchestra, Mazurek and Taylor continued to form groups under the Chicago Underground umbrella, performing as the Chicago Underground Duo, Chicago Underground Trio and Chicago Underground Quartet.

== Discography ==
=== As Chicago Underground Duo ===
- 12° of Freedom (Thrill Jockey, 1998)
- Synesthesia (Thrill Jockey, 2000)
- Axis and Alignment (Thrill Jockey, 2002)
- In Praise of Shadows (Thrill Jockey, 2006)
- Boca Negra (Thrill Jockey, 2010)
- Age of Energy (Northern-Spy, 2012)
- Locus (Northern-Spy, 2014)
- Hyperglyph (International Anthem, 2025)

=== As Chicago Underground Trio ===
- Possible Cube (Delmark, 1999)
- Flamethrower (Delmark, 2000)
- Slon (Thrill Jockey, 2003)
- Chronicle (Delmark, 2007)

=== As Chicago Underground Quartet ===
- Chicago Underground Quartet (Thrill Jockey, 2001)
- Good Days (Astral Spirits Records, 2020)

=== As Chicago Underground Orchestra ===
- Playground (Delmark 1998)

=== As Pharoah & The Underground ===
- Spiral Mercury (Clean Feed Records, 2014) - with Pharoah Sanders and São Paulo Underground
- Primitive Jupiter (Clean Feed Records, 2014) - with Pharoah Sanders and São Paulo Underground

=== As Chicago London Underground ===
- A Night Walking Through Mirrors (Cuneiform Records, 2017) - with Alexander Hawkins and John Edwards
