= Axis and Alignment =

Studio album by Chicago Underground Duo
- Released: 2002
- Recorded: Summer 2001
- Studios: Soma Electronic Music Studios, Chicago
- Genre: Free jazz
- Labels: Thrill Jockey; 106

Chicago Underground Duo chronology
Synesthesia (2000)	Axis and Alignment (2002)	In Praise of Shadows (2006)

Axis and Alignment is an album by the Chicago Underground Duo, featuring multi-instrumentalists Rob Mazurek and Chad Taylor. It was recorded during the summer of 2001 at Soma Electronic Music Studios in Chicago, and was released in 2002 by the Thrill Jockey label.

== Reception ==
Professional ratings
Review scores
Source	Rating
AllMusic	3/5 stars
Pitchfork	7.5/10 stars

In a review for AllMusic, John Duffy wrote: "The two dispense with nearly all conventions of song structure, instead focusing on angular drum-cornet-vibraphone collages that emphasize clashing dynamics and shifting moods... Once again, the members of the Chicago Underground balance the edge between avant-garde jazz and ambient, a crossover they very much helped to create."

Daniel Piotrowski of JazzTimes called the album "sensational" and "the Duo's most dynamic work, featuring some of its densest playing," and stated: "the Chicago Underground Duo continues to explore the space between composition and improvisation, melody and abstraction, jazz and rock."

Writing for All About Jazz, Mark Corroto commented: "Axis And Alignment returns to the duo's freeier work heard on the 2000 release Synesthesia... Taylor produces... varying beats, be they the thunder or the splashes of vibraphone color. As for Mazurek, his Don Cherry/Jon Hassell cornet conquers both open and muted free/world music. Their stripped-down duo minimal approach to music produces an apocalypse of sound."

In an article for PopMatters, Marshall Bowden remarked: "Although the group sprinkles some electronics throughout the album, you are never overwhelmed, always getting the feeling that you are hearing an organic sound created by two musicians who are constantly listening to each other and responding rather than something that is programmed and sterile. Axis and Alignment is sometimes joyous, sometimes messy and loud, sometimes subdued, but never dull or clichéd. Just like good music should be."

A reviewer for Pitchfork wrote: "Mazurek and Taylor should be commended for branching out, for insisting on trying something new when churning out a replica of past successes might well have seemed easier. It's a tough decision for any artist to make. But then, no one ever said success would be easy."

Exclaim!'s David Dacks stated that, with regard to jazz content, "Mazurek is the main contributor, with Don Cherry-like blasts throughout. Taylor's vibes sound more deliberate than ever, but again, when the emphasis is on exact sonics and just-so polyrhythms, he sounds great."

Kevin Lian-Anderson of One Final Note commented: "The collective has been constantly reimagining an alternate universe where Don Cherry enlisted Kraftwerk as close collaborators. Axis and Alignment extends this flexible model, generating warmth in a field rife with the potential for cold, lifeless clashing... their music is a close approximation of those blissful, if transitory, moments which quietly enhance one's life. Ephemeral, true, but we are all the richer having experienced them."

The BBC's Peter Marsh remarked: "Though the prospect of a cornet/drums duo may lack obvious appeal, the CUD's approach transcends the limitations of the format. Taylor's ability to play vibes and drums simultaneously helps... while occasional synthetic basslines from Mazurek's powerbook provide a bedrock for the duo's interplay."

A reviewer for Brainwashed noted that the album features "some great performances of very cool and modern compositions," and wrote: "This disc uses the free jazz idiom with different elements and ideas brought into fold, as the title suggests, making for some interesting listening."

== Track listing ==
Composed by Rob Mazurek and Chad Taylor.

1. "Micro Exit" – 4:19
2. "Lifelines" – 6:48
3. "Particle and Transfiguration" – 2:10
4. "Exponent Red" – 3:09
5. "Average Assumptions and Misunderstandings" – 1:39
6. "Lem" – 1:59
7. "Two Concept for the Storage of Light" – 9:19
8. "Memoirs of a Space Traveller" – 3:42
9. "Rotation" – 1:41
10. "Access and Enlightenment" – 4:18
11. "Noon" – 2:07

== Personnel ==
- Rob Mazurek – cornet, electronics, piano
- Chad Taylor – percussion, vibraphone, guitar
