= Chad Taylor (drummer) =

American musician (born 1973)

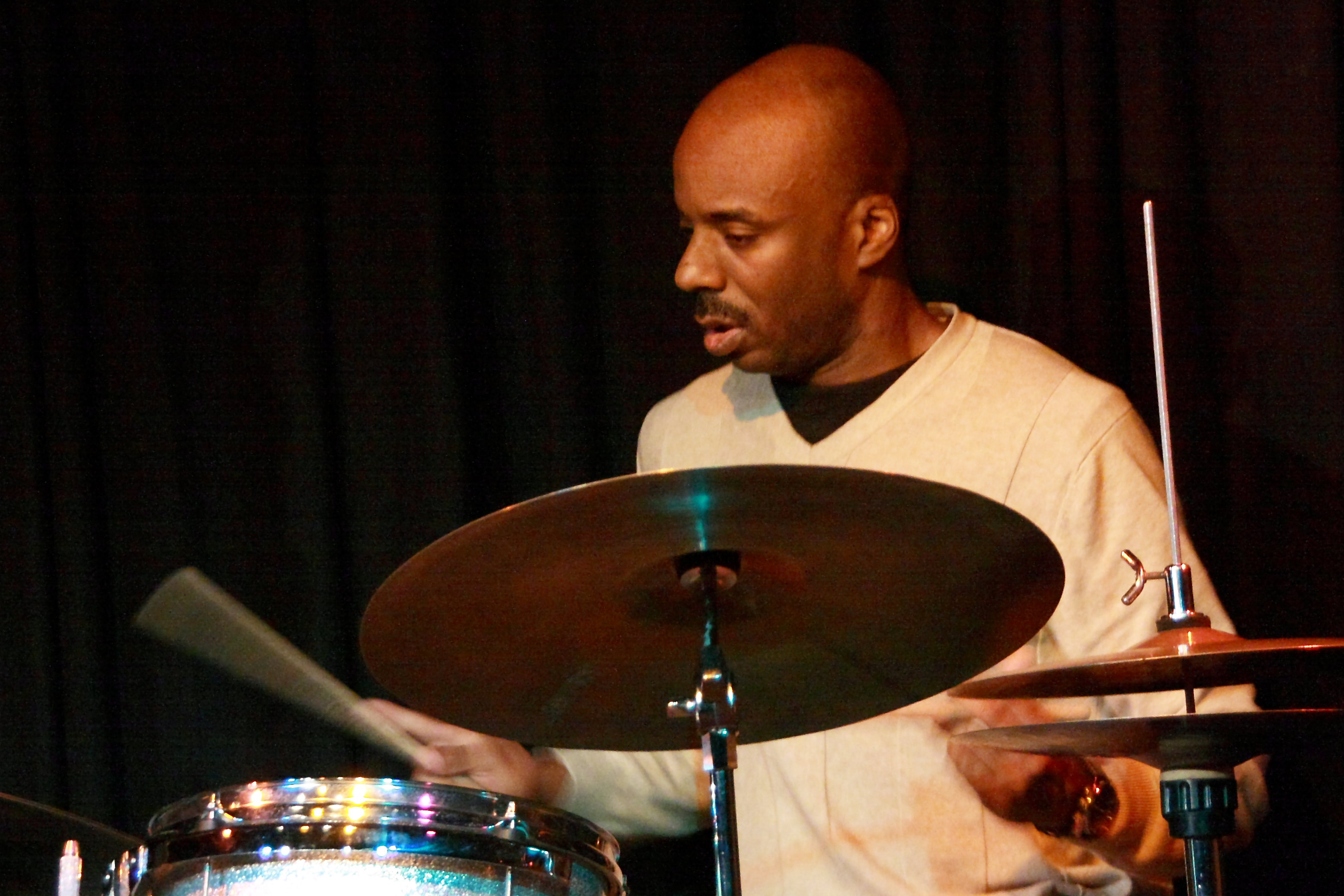
- Taylor with The Digital Primitives at Club W71

Background information
- Born: Chad Edward Taylor; March 19, 1973 (age 53); Tempe, Arizona
- Genres: Jazz, rock, folk, experimental music
- Occupations: Musician, composer
- Instruments: Drumset, percussion, Mbira

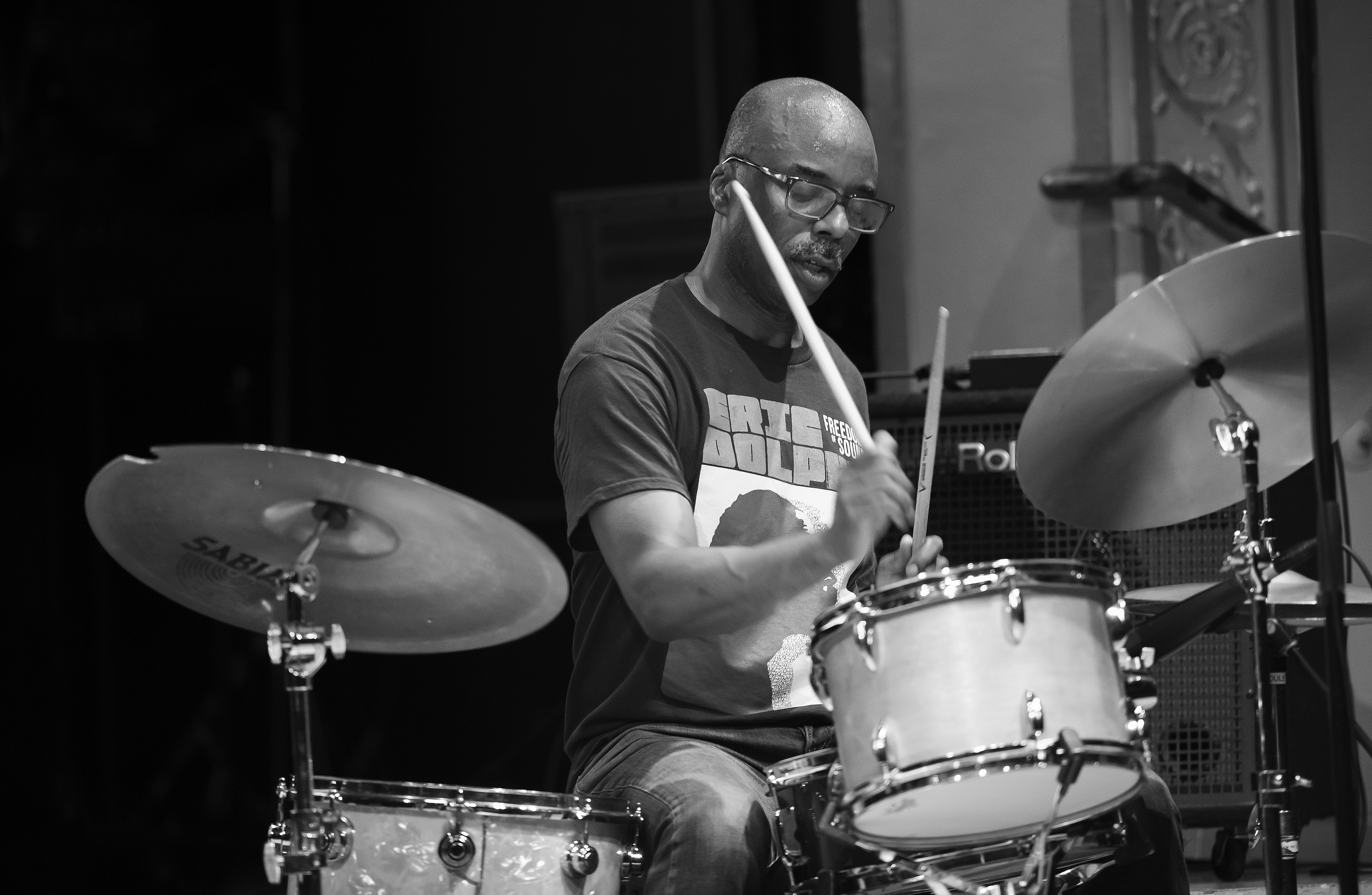
Chad Taylor, Arts for Art - Vision Festival 2024. Photo by Marek Lazarski

Chad Taylor (born March 19, 1973) is an American drummer, percussionist, and composer. Taylor leads both the Chad Taylor Trio with Brian Settles and Neil Podgurski and Circle Down with Angelica Sanchez and Chris Lightcap. He is a founding member of the Chicago Underground along with Jeff Parker and Rob Mazurek. In 2024, he was selected to lead the University of Pittsburgh's Jazz Studies Program while holding the university's William S. Dietrich II Endowed Chair in Jazz Studies.

== Early life ==
Taylor was born in Tempe, Arizona and was brought up in a musical household. His father, once an aspiring concert pianist, exposed his young son to Duke Ellington, Bach, Thelonious Monk, and Mozart. By age 8, Taylor started taking guitar lessons. At 10, he relocated with his mother and sister to Chicago where he continued his studies on guitar as well as starting snare drum lessons. In 1988 Taylor began studying jazz drumming and classical percussion in High School and took ensemble classes at The Bloom School of Jazz. Through the help and encouragement of bassist Dennis Carrol, Taylor started performing in Chicago with Rob Mazurek. Upon graduating from Lane Tech in 1991, Chad received a full scholarship to study classical guitar at Millikin University. After attending his freshman year he decided to focus on jazz drumming and the following year transferred to the School of Jazz division of The New School in New York City.

== Career ==
In 1997 Taylor moved back to Chicago where his roommate, bassist Joshua Abrams introduced him to saxophonist Fred Anderson. Taylor started performing regularly with Anderson at The Velvet Lounge. In addition, Abrams and Taylor started the collective Sticks and Stones with Matana Roberts that hosted the weekly jam session at The Velvet Lounge. Rob Mazurek invited him to perform along with Jeff Parker at a weekly composers workshop at The Green Mill which eventually developed into The Chicago Underground ensemble. In 1998 the first Chicago Underground Duo recording, 12° of Freedom was released on the Thrill Jockey label. Taylor was the drummer on Sam Prekop's 1999 self titled release Sam Prekop as well as the 2005 release Who's Your New Professor.

In 2002, Taylor recorded Titration, his debut as a leader for Delmark Records. The core ensemble consisted of Jemeel Moondoc, Tom Abbs and Steve Swell. The same year Taylor started working with Jeff Parker's Trio with Chris Lopes on bass, releasing Like-Coping in 2003 and The Relatives in 2005.

In 2004 Taylor started working with guitarist Marc Ribot in his band Spiritual Unity with Roy Campbell and Henry Grimes. Taylor produced Ribot's 2014 album Live At The Vanguard.

In 2009 Taylor started working with the folk/rock band Iron & Wine and toured with the band from 2010 to 2012. Taylor was the drummer on the 2011 release Kiss Each Other Clean.

In 2011 Taylor began the master's program in Jazz History and Research at Rutgers University under the direction of Lewis Porter. His master thesis was an examination of form and process in the music of Henry Threadgill's Zooid.

In 2012 Taylor joined a collaboration with Darius Jones, Sean Conly and Alex Harding called Grass Roots, they recorded and released their self titled album on AUM Fidelity. In 2013 Taylor started working with bassist Eric Revis in his Quartet which released Sing Me Some Cry. After finishing the masters program at Rutgers University in 2015 Taylor started teaching adjunct classes in music theory, jazz history and music appreciation. He also taught music history at Berkeley College in NYC. Taylor produced a solo work called Myths and Morals. Taylor started working with James Brandon Lewis in 2016 and the two started performing as a duo and released Radiant Imprints in 2018 and Live in Willisau in 2020. In addition, he joined Jaimie Branch's Fly or Die ensemble in 2016. In 2019, Taylor formed a new ensemble with tenor saxophonist Brian Settles and pianist Neil Podgurski, which released The Daily Biological for Cuneiform Records in 2020.

=== Academic career ===
In 2024, Taylor was selected to lead the University of Pittsburgh's Jazz Studies Program in the Dietrich School of Arts and Sciences, succeeding prior heads of the program which include Nathan Davis, Geri Allen, and Nicole Mitchell. In this capacity, Taylor will hold the William S. Dietrich II Endowed Chair in Jazz Studies and lead the university's annual Jazz Seminar and Concert series.

== Notable mentions ==
Taylor was included in the "Rising Star" category of DownBeat Magazine's 2020 Critics Poll. Taylor received the most votes in the 2020 El Intruso's International Poll for percussion. In 2020, The Daily Biological by the Chad Taylor Trio was selected in NPR's jazz critics poll and was also included in JazzTimes's Top 40 New Jazz Releases.

== Discography ==
=== As leader ===
- 2003 Active Ingredients, Titration (Delmark)
- 2009 Circle Down (482 Music)
- 2018 Myths and Morals (Ears and Eyes records)
- 2020 The Chad Taylor Trio, The Daily Biological (Cuneiform)
- 2022 The Chad Taylor Trio, The Reel (Astral Spirits)

=== with Chicago Underground ===
- 1998 Chicago Underground Duo, 12 Degrees of Freedom (Thrill Jockey)
- 1998 Chicago Underground Orchestra, Playground (Thrill Jockey)
- 1999 Chicago Underground Trio, Possible Cube (Delmark)
- 2000 Chicago Underground Trio, Flame Thrower (Thrill Jockey)
- 2000 Chicago Underground Duo, Synesthesia (Thrill Jockey)
- 2001 Chicago Underground Quartet, Chicago Underground Quartet (Thrill Jockey)
- 2002 Chicago Underground Duo, Axis and Alignment (Thrill Jockey)
- 2004 Chicago Underground Trio, Slon (Thrill Jockey)
- 2006 Chicago Underground Duo, In Praise of Shadows (Thrill Jockey)
- 2007 Chicago Underground Trio, Chronicle (Delmark)
- 2010 Chicago Underground Duo, Boca Negra, (Thrill Jockey)
- 2012 Chicago Underground Duo, Age of Energy (Northern Spy Records)
- 2014 Pharaoh and the Underground, Spiral Mercury (Clean Feed Records)
- 2014 Pharaoh and the Underground, Primitive Jupiter (Clean Feed Records)
- 2014 Chicago Underground Duo, Locus (Northern Spy)
- 2017 Chicago London Underground, A Night Walking Through Mirrors (Cuneiform Records)
- 2020 Chicago Underground Quartet, Good Days (Astral Spirits)

=== with James Brandon Lewis ===
- 2019 James Brandon Lewis/ Chad Taylor, Radiant Imprints (Offrecords)
- 2020 James Brandon Lewis/Chad Taylor, Live in Willisau, (Intakt Records)
- 2020 Molecular (Intakt)
- 2021 Red Lilly Quintet, Jesup Wagon (Tao Forms)
- 2021 Code of Being (Intakt Records)

=== with Jaimie Branch ===
- 2017 Fly or Die (International Anthem)
- 2019 Fly or Die II, Bird Dogs of Paradise (International Anthem)
- 2021 Fly or Die, Live in Zurich (International Anthem)

=== with Eric Revis ===
- 2014 In Memory of Things Not Seen (Clean Feed)
- 2017 Sing Me some Cry (Clean Feed)
- 2020 Slipknots Through the Looking Glass (Pyroclastic)

=== with Jeff Parker ===
- 2003 Like-Coping (Delmark)
- 2005 The Relatives (Thrill Jockey)
- 2012 A Bright Light in Winter (Delmark)

=== with Fred Anderson ===
- 1998 Fred Anderson Quartet Volume One (Asian Improv)
- 1999 Fred Anderson Quartet Volume Two (Asian Improv)
- 2003 Back at the Velvet Lounge (Delmark)
- 2009 21st Century Chase (Delmark)
- 2009 Birthday Live 2000 (Asian Improv)

=== with Marc Ribot ===
- 2005 Spiritual Unity (Pi Recordings)
- 2014 Live at the Village Vanguard (Pi Recordings)
- 2018 Songs of Resistance (Anti)

=== with Nicole Mitchell ===
- 2009 Emerald Hills (RogueArt)
- 2014 The Secret Escapades of Velvet Anderson (RogueArt)

=== with Digital Primitives ===
- 2007 Digital Primitives (HopScotch)
- 2009 Digital Primitives, Hum Crackle Pop (HopScotch)
- 2013 Digital Primitives, Lipsomuch/Soul Searching (Hopscotch)

=== with Triptych Myth ===
- 2003 Triptych Myth (Hopscotch)
- 2005 The Beautiful (AUM Fidelity)
- 2018 Triptych Myth with Cale Brandley, Finding Fire (Birdwatcher Records)

=== with David Lord ===
- 2018 Forest Standards Vol 1 (Big Ego)
- 2020 Forest Standards Vol 2 (Big Ego)
- 2023 Forest Standards Vol 3 (Big Ego)
- 2024 Forest Standards Vol 4 (Big Ego)

=== with Daunik Lazro ===
- 2018: A Pride of Lions, 5tet with Joe McPhee, Guillaume Séguron, J. Abrams

- 2022: No Questions-No Answers, 5tet A Pride of Lions - Rogue Art

=== as co-leader ===
- 2002 Sticks and Stones (482 Music)
- 2004 Sticks and Stones, Shed Grace (Thrill Jockey)
- 2011 Grass Roots (AUM Fidelity)
- 2013 Side A, A New Margin (Clean Feed)
- 2014 Side A, In the Abstract (Clean Feed)
- 2018 A Pride of Lions (The Bridge Sessions)
- 2021 Time No Changes with Chris Schlarb (Astral Spirits)
- 2021 Mind Maintenance with Joshua Abrams (Drag City)
- 2021 In a Perpetual Now of Instantaneous Visibility with Rosa Barba (Corbett/Dempsey)

=== as sideman ===
- 1998 Loren Connors/Alan Licht, Hoffman Estates (Drag City)
- 1998 Marya Lawrence, All the Way Back (Oxogen records)
- 1998 David Boykin Outet, Evidence of Life on Other Planets Vol 1. (Thrill Jockey Records)
- 1999 David Boykin Outet, Evidence of Life on Other Planets Vol 2 (Box Media)
- 1999 Sam Prekop, Sam Prekop (Thrill Jockey)
- 2001 Stereolab, Sound-Dust (Elektra Records)
- 2002 Brokeback, Looks at the Bird (Thrill Jockey)
- 2003 Tom Abbs and Frequency Response, Conscription (CIMP)
- 2003 Jeff Chan, Jeff Chan In Chicago (Asian Improv)
- 2005 Sam Prekop, Who's Your New Professor (Thrill Jockey)
- 2007 Steve Swell/David Taylor, Double Diploid (CIMP)
- 2009 Avram Fefer Trio, Ritual (Clean Feed)
- 2009 The Swell Season, Strict Joy (Anti-)
- 2009 Tom Abbs, Lost and Found (Engine)
- 2010 Jason Ajemian, Protest Heaven (482 Music)
- 2011 Avram Fefer Trio, Eliyahu (Not Two Records)
- 2011 Iron & Wine, Kiss Each Other Clean (Warner Bros.)
- 2012 David Liebman, Surreality (Yellowbird)
- 2012 Jason Ajemian and Joy Mega, Forever Is Something Inside You (New Atlantis)
- 2012 Joshua Abrams, Represencing (Eremite Records)
- 2013 Taylor Ho Bynum, Navigation (FireHouse12)
- 2013 Expoding Star Orchestra, Matter Anti-Matter (RogueArt)
- 2014 Jason Ajemian, A Way A Land Of Life (NoBusiness)
- 2015 Exploding Star Orchestra, Galactic Parables Vol 1(Cuneiform)
- 2016 Mara Rosembloom, Prairie Burn (Fresh Sounds Records)
- 2017 Psychic Temple, IV (Joyful Noise Recordings)
- 2017 Yoni Kretzmer, Five (Outlaw recordings)
- 2018 Anthony Shadduck, Quartet and Double Quartet (Big Ego)
- 2018 Steve Swell, Kende Dreams (Silkheart Records)
- 2018 Aruan Ortiz Trio, Live in Zurich (Intakt)
- 2018 Tom Abbs and Frequency Response, Hawthorne (Engine)
- 2018 Jason Stein with Hearts and Minds, Electroradiance (Astal Spirits)
- 2019 Avram Fefer Quartet, Testament (Clean Feed)
- 2019 Eamon Forgaty, Blue Values (Jealous Butcher)
- 2019 Rob Brown, From Here to Hear (RogueArt)
- 2019 Rob Mazurek, Desert Encrypts Vol 1 (Astral Spirits)
- 2020 Exploding Star Orchestra, Dimensional Stardust (International Anthem)
- 2020 Mara Rosenbloom, Respiration (Fresh Sounds Records)
- 2020 Warriors of the Wonderful Sound, Sound Path (Clean Feed)
- 2020 Psychic Temple, Houses of the Holy (Joyful Noise Recordings)
- 2021 Alchemy Sound Project, Afrika Love (ARC)
- 2021 Giovanni Guidi, Ojos de Gato (CAM Jazz)
