= 12° of Freedom =

Studio album by Chicago Underground Duo
- Released: 1998
- Recorded: January 15, 1997; June 14, 1997; June 25, 1997
- Studio: Lunar Cabaret, Chicago; WNUR studio, Evanston, Illinois; James Bond Loft, Toronto
- Genre: Free jazz
- Label: Thrill Jockey; 060

Chicago Underground Duo chronology
12° of Freedom (1998)	Synesthesia (2000)

12° of Freedom (also listed as 12 Degrees of Freedom) is the debut album by the Chicago Underground Duo, featuring multi-instrumentalists Rob Mazurek and Chad Taylor. It was recorded during January and June 1997 at three different locations, and was released in 1998 by the Thrill Jockey label. Guitarist Jeff Parker also appears on three tracks.

In an interview, Mazurek stated that his music is "a protest against anything or anybody that wants to put up some kind of barrier between total creativity," and remarked: "The first Chicago Underground record is called 12 Degrees of Freedom. It has those same precepts, not just in music but dealing with psychology, spirituality, the whole thing."

== Reception ==
Professional ratings
Review scores
Source	Rating
The Penguin Guide to Jazz	3/4 stars
The Virgin Encyclopedia of Jazz	3/5 stars

The editors of The Wire included the album in their 1998 Rewind, listing the year's 50 best albums.

Monica Kendrick of the Chicago Reader stated that "Mazurek and... Taylor use vibes, piano, and bamboo flute along with their primary instruments to construct subtle, spartan soundscapes that occasionally burst into flurries of notes and beats or fill out into mesmerizing grooves."

Writing for CMJ New Music Monthly, Daniel Piotrowski noted that the album's "message... has as much to do with musical freedom as with human freedom," and commented: "While this group truly fits into the legacy of Chicago exploratory music... Mazurek and Taylor forge their own identity and style."

The New York Times's Ben Ratliff praised Thrill Jockey for releasing the album, writing: "The indie-rock scene has reached a dry point, so more small rock labels ought to take a chance on jazz, as this one did; their approach to recording the music, and the meaning of their imprimatur to an entirely different group of listeners, could rejuvenate jazz's constituency. Young people put their money where the excitement is; they don't care what it's called."

== Track listing ==
1. "The Pursued" (Rob Mazurek/Chad Taylor) – 4:30
2. "Not Quite Dark Yet and the Stars Shining Above the Withered Fields" (Rob Mazurek) – 6:30
3. "January 15th" (Rob Mazurek/Chad Taylor) – 10:47
4. "The Big Bang Theory" (Rob Mazurek/Chad Taylor) – 3:47
5. "Waiting for You is Like Watching Stillness Grow into Enormous Wings" (Rob Mazurek) – 2:57
6. "Twelve Degrees of Freedom" (Rob Mazurek/Chad Taylor) – 3:52
7. "Lemon Grass" (Rob Mazurek/Chad Taylor) – 1:41
8. "Gratitude" (Chad Taylor) – 5:03
9. "Into the Unanimous Blue" (Rob Mazurek/Chad Taylor) – 7:31
- Tracks 1, 3, 4, and 9 were recorded at Lunar Cabaret in Chicago on January 15, 1997. Tracks 2, 5, 7, and 8 were recorded at James Bond Loft in Toronto on June 25, 1997. Track 6 was recorded at WNUR studio in Evanston, Illinois, on June 14, 1997.

== Personnel ==
- Rob Mazurek – cornet, piano, bamboo flute
- Chad Taylor – percussion, vibraphone
- Jeff Parker – guitar (tracks 2, 5, 7)
