= Rob Mazurek =

American musician

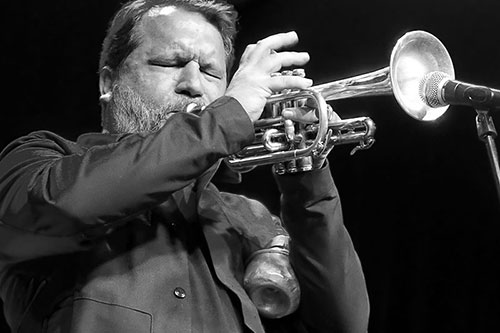
- Performing in Aarhus, Denmark 2015

Background information
- Born: Robert Mazurek; July 8, 1965 (age 61); Jersey City, New Jersey, U.S.
- Origin: Chicago, Illinois, U.S.
- Genres: Jazz, experimental, avant-garde
- Occupations: Musician, composer, visual artist
- Instruments: Cornet, electronics, piano, vocals
- Years active: 1983–present
- Member of: Exploding Star Orchestra; Chicago Underground; Sao Paulo Underground; Pharoah and the Underground; Pulsar Quartet; Rob Mazurek Quintet; Rob Mazurek Octet; Starlicker
- Website: robmazurek.com

Rob Mazurek (born July 08, 1965) is an American composer, cornetist, and visual artist.

== Biography ==
Mazurek was born on July 08, 1965 in Jersey City, New Jersey, and played trumpet and cornet in high school in Naperville, Illinois. He first learned the foundations of improvised music while studying jazz theory and practice with David Bloom at the Bloom School of Jazz in Chicago, eventually working with other Chicago musicians like Kenny Prince, Robert Barry, Jodie Christian, Lin Halliday and Earma Thompson.

In 1996, Mazurek formed the longstanding Chicago Underground Collective with guitarist Jeff Parker and drummer Chad Taylor, a unit that ranges in size from duo to orchestra. The Collective earned Mazurek the attention of Chicago's underground community at the beginning of the 21st century, resulting in high-profile collaborations with other genre-defying artists like Gastr Del Sol, Jim O'Rourke, Sam Prekop, Stereolab and Tortoise. Isotope 217 (started by Jeff Parker) was consequently born from these endeavors.

While living in Brazil from 2000 to 2005, Mazurek constructed exotic soundscapes from the sounds of the Amazonian rain forest, including electric eels recorded at INPA research laboratory in Manaus and audio culled from storm systems on the outskirts of Brasília. It was in São Paulo that Mazurek met Mauricio Takara and Guilherme Granado, his partners in the São Paulo Underground, a group dedicated to exploring and expanding upon Brazilian musical traditions.

Originally inspired by a joint commission from the Chicago Cultural Center and Jazz Institute of Chicago, Mazurek founded the Exploding Star Orchestra in 2005 to investigate Chicago's avant-garde musical traditions. The Orchestra has premiered a number of extended suites since its inception, including "Sting Ray and the Beginning of Time," "Cosmic Tomes for Sleepwalking Lovers," "Constellations for Inner Light Projections for Bill Dixon," "Stars Have Shapes," "63 Moons of Jupiter", "Transgressions Suite" and "Galactic Parables."

Mazurek currently leads a number of ensembles, including Exploding Star Orchestra, Pharaoh and the Underground (featuring Pharoah Sanders), Chicago Underground, Pulsar Quartet, São Paulo Underground, Skull Sessions, Sound Is Quintet, Starlicker, Mandarin Movie, and Throne of the House of Good and Evil, each of which possesses its own distinct musical personality. He has collaborated with a wide variety of artists, such as Bill Dixon, Pharoah Sanders, Mike Ladd, Roscoe Mitchell, Yusef Lateef, Fred Anderson, Naná Vasconcelos, Mamelo Sound System, Alexandre Kassin, Marcelo Camelo, and others.

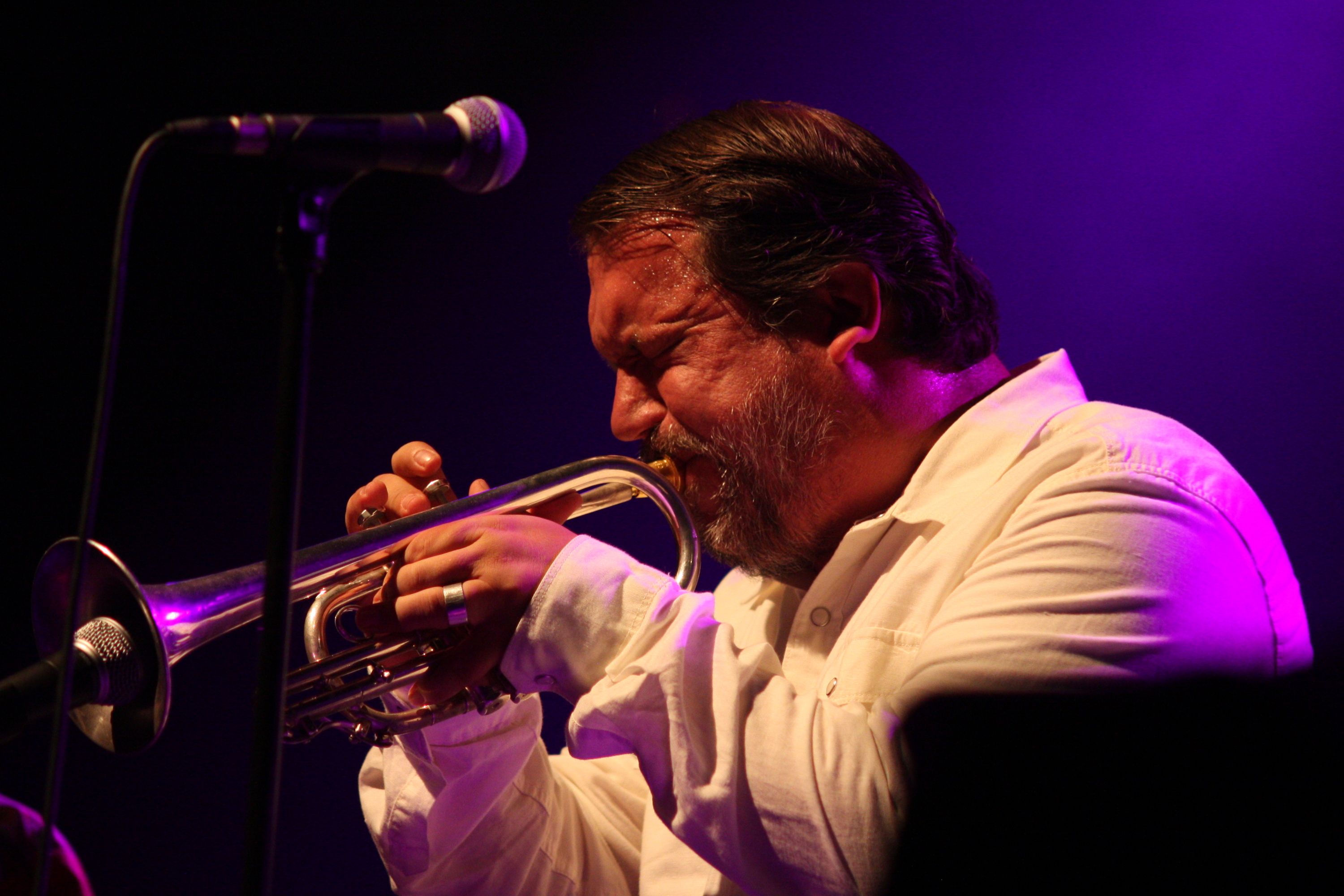
Mazurek at the 2013 German Jazz Festival

As a composer, Mazurek has written over 300 original compositions over the past 30 years, and has released at least 55 recordings on various labels including Aesthetics, Cuneiform, Delmark, Family Vineyard, Mego, Northern Spy, Submarine, Thrill Jockey, and his own label Infinity Dogs. Beyond his ensemble efforts, Mazurek's solo endeavors reflect his interest in musique concrete and electronic sound manipulation, with releases on Aesthetics, Bottrop-Boy, Delmark, Mego and Moikai that document his cornet playing augmented by computer programming, electronic effects and keyboards.

Mazurek has also been awarded a number of commissions and awards. In 2016, he received a grant from the Graham Foundation for Advanced Studies in the Fine Arts for an experimental film titled "The Farnsworth Scores" in collaboration with filmmaker Lee Anne Schmitt, which was shot at Mies van der Rohe's iconic Farnsworth House. In 2013, he was commissioned to compose the "Galactic Parables" suite by the Sant'Anna Arresi Jazz Festival in Sant'Anna Arresi, Sardinia, Italy. In 2011, he was commissioned to compose "Violent Orchid Suite" by the Jazz & Wine Festival in Cormons, Italy, and "Transgressions Suite", also by the Sant'Anna Arresi Jazz Festival. In 2010, he received the Commissioning Music/USA grant from Meet the Composer for a multi-media work developed in collaboration with video artist/choreographer Marianne Kim.

Additionally, Mazurek works as a visual artist (incorporating sound, painting and video) with numerous international performances, exhibitions and artist residencies. He has shown his multi-media works at locations throughout the United States and Europe, including the Rothko Chapel in Houston, Texas, where his paintings hang on the office walls. His pieces have also appeared at Marfa Book Company (Marfa, Texas), Galleria Coletivo (São Paulo, Brazil), Abbey Royal de Fontevraud (Fontevraud-l'Abbaye, Anjou, France), Gantner Multi-Media Center (Bourogne, France), Heaven Gallery (Chicago, Illinois, USA), Naked Duck Gallery (New York, New York, USA), Le Grande Fabrique (Dieppe, France) and URDLA Centre Estampe et Livre (Villeurbanne, France).

== Discography ==
=== as Chicago Underground ===
Year released	Title	Label	Notes
1998	12 Degrees of Freedom	Thrill Jockey	
1998	Playground	Delmark	
1999	Possible Cube	Delmark	
2000	Flamethrower	Delmark	
2000	Synesthesia	Thrill Jockey	
2001	Chicago Underground Quartet	Thrill Jockey	
2002	Axis and Alignment	Thrill Jockey	
2004	Slon	Thrill Jockey	
2006	In Praise of Shadows	Thrill Jockey	
2007	Chronicle	Delmark	Trio
2010	Boca Negra	Thrill Jockey	
2012	Age of Energy	Northern Spy	
2014	Primitive Jupiter	Clean Feed	With São Paulo Underground and Pharoah Sanders
2014	Spiral Mercury	Clean Feed	With São Paulo Underground and Pharoah Sanders
2014	Locus	(Northern Spy)	Duo
2000	A Night Walking Through Mirrors	Cuneiform Records	As Chicago London Underground
2020	Good Days	Astral Spirits Records	Quartet

=== as Sao Paulo Underground ===
Year released	Title	Label	Notes
2006	Sauna: Um, Dois, Tres	Aesthetics	
2008	The Principle of Intrusive Relationships	Aesthetics	
2011	Tres Cabecas Loucuras	Cuneiform/Submarine	
2013	Beija Flors Velho E Sujo	Cuneiform/Infinity Dogs	
2016	Beija Flors Velho E Sujo	Cuneiform/Infinity Dogs	
2016	Cantos Invisiveis (Cuneiform)	Cuneiform/Infinity Dogs	

=== as Isotope 217 ===
Year released	Title	Label	Notes
1998	The Unstable Molecule	Thrill Jockey	
1999	Utonian Automatic	Thrill Jockey	
2000	Who Stole The I Walkman	Thrill Jockey	

=== as Tigersmilk ===
Year released	Title	Label	Notes
2003	Tigersmilk	Family Vineyard	
2005	Tales From The Bottle	Family Vineyard	
2007	Android Love Cry	Family Vineyard	

=== as Exploding Star Orchestra ===
Year released	Title	Label	Notes
2007	We Are All from Somewhere Else	Thrill Jockey	
2008	Bill Dixon with Exploding Star Orchestra	Thrill Jockey	
2010	Stars Have Shapes	Delmark	
2013	Matter Anti-Matter	RogueArt	With Roscoe Mitchell
2013	The Space Between	Delmark	As Rob Mazurek's Exploding Star Electro Acoustic Ensemble
2015	Galactic Parables: Volume 1	Cuneiform	
2020	Dimensional Stardust	International Anthem / Nonesuch Records	
2023	Lightning Dreamers	International Anthem Recording Company	

=== as solo and others ===
- 1994 Rob Mazurek Quartet Man Facing East (Hep)
- 1995 Rob Mazurek Quintet Badlands (Hep)
- 1997 Rob Mazurek Quintet Green & Blue (Hep)
- 1999 Orton Socket 99 Explosions (Moikai)
- 2002 Rob Mazurek Amorphic Winged (Walking Road)
- 2002 Rob Mazurek Silver Spines (Delmark)
- 2003 Rob Mazurek/Liam Gillick Thought Farming (En/Of [Bottrop-Boy])
- 2004 Rob Mazurek Music For Shattered Light Box and 7 Posters (Bottrop-Boy)
- 2004 Rob Mazurek Sweet and Vicious Like Frankenstein (mego)
- 2005 Mandarin Movie Mandarin Movie (Aesthetics Records)
- 2008 Rob Mazurek Abstraction on Robert D'Arbrissel (Adluna)
- 2009 Rob Mazurek Quintet Sound Is (Delmark)
- 2009 Rohrer/Mazurek/Takara/Barely Projections of a Seven Foot Ghost (Peligro)
- 2010 Rob Mazurek Calma Gente (Submarine)
- 2011 Starlicker Double Demon (Delmark)
- 2012 Rob Mazurek Pulsar Quartet Stellar Pulsations (Delmark)
- 2012 Rob Mazurek/Carlos Issa Eclusa (Submarine)
- 2013 Rob Mazurek Episodes (Wapapura)
- 2013 Rob Mazurek Octet Skull Sessions (Cuneiform)
- 2014 Rob Mazurek Mother Ode (Corbett vs Dempsey)
- 2014 Rob Mazurek Alternate Moon Cycles Waning Crescent (International Anthem Recording Co.)
- 2014 Rob Mazurek Black Cube SP Return the Tides: Ascension Suite and Holy Ghost (Cuneiform Records)
- 2015 Rob Mazurek Vortice of the Faun (Astral Spirits)
- 2016 Rob Mazurek and Emmett Kelly Alien Flower Sutra (International Anthem Recording Company)
- 2024 Rob Mazurek Quartet (Rob Mazurek, Angelica Sanchez, Tomeka Reid, Chad Taylor) Color Systems (RogueArt)
