= Astral Spirits Records =

US independent record label

- Founded: 2014
- Founder: Nathan Cross
- Genre: free jazz; improvisation; experimental
- Location: Austin, Texas, U.S.
- Official website: astralspiritsrecords.com

Astral Spirits Records is an independent record label specializing in free jazz, improvisation, and experimental music. Based in Austin, Texas, the label was founded in 2014 by musician Nathan Cross, who started Astral Spirits as a platform for "the new wave of heavy free jazz"; as the breadth of the label's offerings expanded, imprint Astral Editions became the home for its more experimental releases.

Astral Spirits has been featured in Bandcamp Daily, All About Jazz, the Chicago Reader, DownBeat, and the Free Jazz Collective; Rolling Stone has called the label "crucial" and "enormously prolific"; and in 2019, Tiny Mix Tapes included Astral Spirits among their favorite labels of the decade.

== History ==
In the early 2010s, Cross began to consider starting a record label or a live-recorded series as a way to stay involved in music without touring extensively. He spoke with Morgan Coy of Monofonus Press while in the early planning stages, and Coy encouraged him to start a label under the Monofonus umbrella. Cross named the label after a recurring song title in Joe McPhee's work: the first "Astral Spirits" track appeared on McPhee's Trinity, recorded in 1971, and he continued to use the name on later releases (e.g., Oleo and In the Spirit).

Astral Spirits began as a cassette-based label, but later expanded to include vinyl and CDs. All albums are also available as digital releases, but the catalogue is not available through low-revenue streaming services such as Spotify.

Since the label's inception, Cross has handled most logistics––aside from artwork and layout––himself, including curation, press, and shipping.

== Astral Editions ==
Cross launched Astral Editions in 2019, initially intending to make it a digital-only offshoot. The imprint began carrying physical products in 2020, distinguishing itself instead by a greater emphasis on experimentalism outside of the jazz continuum. The Astral Editions Bandcamp carries the tagline, "a primer on some of the best unheard experimental music being made today by names you don't know yet, but should".

== Art and design ==
The Astral Spirits logo was designed by Mason McFee, who also chose the label's signature Cooper Black font; for the first two years, McFee created all tape and LP artwork. Jaime Zuverza later took over design, eventually developing a template for the label's distinctive visual aesthetic; he listens to, and creates artwork specifically for, the majority of Astral Spirits releases.

== Roster ==
- [Ahmed]
- Akiyama / Field / Vidic
- Alcorn / McPhee / Vandermark
- Ali / Bordreuil / Mattrey
- Rodrigo Amado / Chris Corsano
- Anahuac
- Lotte Anker / Fred Lonberg-Holm & Dave Jackson / Dirk Serries
- Artifacts: Nicole Mitchell, Tomeka Reid, Mike Reed (musician)
- Astral Ascending
- Ballister
- Charles Barabé
- Barker Trio
- Ben Bennett
- Berman / Lytton / Roebke
- Billington / Shippy / Wyche
- Birchall / Smal / Webster
- Jeb Bishop
- Black Spirituals
- Bloor
- Cyril Bondi & d'incise
- Bouchons d'Orielles / Warsaw Improvisers Orchestra
- Boxhead Ensemble
- Broken Trap Ensemble
- Peter Brötzmann & Fred Lonberg-Holm
- Caldwell / Tester
- Caloia / Charuest / Fousek
- Cameron / Carter / Håker Flaten
- Lisa Cameron & Sandy Ewen
- CARL
- Daniel Carter & Andrew Barker
- Chatoyant
- Chicago Underground Quartet
- Jack Cooper & Jeff Tobias
- Crazy Bread
- Crazy Doberman
- Alex Cunningham & claire rousay
- Jeremiah Cymerman & Charlie Looker
- Signe Dahlgreen
- John Dikeman
- Dikeman / Gonzalez / Håker Flaten / Horne
- Arrington de Dionyso & Ted Byrnes
- de Dionyso / Meek / Rico
- R. Lee Dockery & Smokey Emery
- Tashi Dorji & Tyler Damon
- East of the Valley Blues
- EAVE
- Harris Eisendstadt
- Emmeluth / Knedal Andersen / Skavhaug Nergaard
- Karl Evangelista with Alexander Hawkins, Louis Moholo-Moholo, and Trevor Watts
- Sandy Ewen & Lisa Cameron
- Alvin Fielder Quartet
- Colin Fisher Quartet
- Michael Foster & Ben Bennett
- Fraser / Davis / Malaby (with Laubrock & Allemano)
- Rob Frye
- The Gate
- GOATFACE
- Gordon Grdina & Jim Black
- Greene / Smith / Moses
- Mats Gustafsson & Joachim Nordwall
- Will Guthrie
- Gerrit Hatcher
- Hearts & Minds
- Sarah Hennies
- HMS
- William Hooker Trio
- Hupata!
- Icepick
- In the Sea
- Tony Irving & Massimo Magee
- Jackson / Baker / Kirshner
- Jerman • Barnes
- Johansson / Grip / Fite
- Amirtha Kidambi & Lea Bertucci
- Kid Millions & Jim Sauter
- Quin Kirchner
- Komeshi Trio
- Konstrukt with Graham Massey & David McLean
- Muyassar Kurdi & Nicholas Jozwiak
- Kuzu
- KVL
- Dustin Laurenzi
- Dustin Laurenzi's Snaketime
- Stefano Leonardi & Antonio Bertoni
- Brandon Lopez
- Matthew Lux's Communication Arts Quartet
- Mike Majkowski
- Rob Mazurek
- Mazzarella / Haker Flaten / Ra
- Nick Mazzarella Trio
- John McCowen
- Joe McPhee
- Roscoe Mitchell & Mike Reed
- Mockunas / Mazurkiewicz / Berre
- Monas
- Thurston Moore & Umut Caglar
- More Eaze / A.F. Jones & Steve Flato
- Nakatani / Kawabata / Chou
- Aurora Nealand / Steve Marquette / Anton Hatwich / Paul Thibodeaux
- Aaron Novik
- Obnox
- Parish / Rowden / Nakatani
- Jessica Pavone
- Phicus
- Rankin-Parker / Pearce
- RED Trio
- Rempis / Piet / Daisy
- claire rousay
- Charlie Rumback
- Charles Rumback with Jim Baker & John Tate
- Charles Rumback Quartet
- Chris Schlarb & Chad Taylor
- Seabrook / Cooper-Moore / Cleaver
- Brandon Seabrook String Trio
- Mako Sica feat: Tatsu Aoki, Thymme Jones & Jacob Fawcett
- Mako Sica & Hamid Drake
- Sfyria Trio
- Aram Shelton & Christian Rønn
- Shiroishi / Golia / Fujioka / Cline
- Shit & Shine
- Paula Shocron / William Parker / Pablo Díaz
- Wally Shoup Sax Trio + 1
- Andrew Smiley
- Wadada Leo Smith / Douglas R. Ewart / Mike Reed
- Sound American
- Spires that In The Sunset Rise
- SSBT
- Luke Stewart
- Luke Stewart Exposure Quintet
- Macie Stewart & Lia Kohl
- Tim Stine Trio
- Strictly Missionary
- Survival Unit III
- Taco Bells with Pekka Airaksinen
- Talibam! with Alan Wilkinson
- La Tene
- Tereshkova
- Thomas / Butcher / Solberg
- Tredici Bacci / ENPSE
- Vasco Trillia & Ilia Belorukov
- Lina Tullgren / Alec Toku Whiting
- Vernacular
- W-2
- Pierce Warnecke / Louis Laurain
- Jacob Wick & Phil Sudderberg
- Chris Williams & Patrick Shiroishi
- Mars Williams
- Otomo Yoshihide & Chris Pitsiokos
