= TNT (Tortoise album) =

Studio album by Tortoise
- Released: March 10, 1998
- Recorded: November 1996 – November 1997
- Studios: Soma and Idful, Chicago, Illinois
- Genres: Post-rock; jazz-rock; dub; minimalism; krautrock; exotica
- Length: 64:48
- Label: Thrill Jockey
- Producer: John McEntire

Tortoise chronology
Millions Now Living Will Never Die (1996)	TNT (1998)	In the Fishtank 5 (1999)

TNT is the third studio album by American post-rock band Tortoise, released in 1998 by Thrill Jockey. After Jeff Parker joined the band in 1996, Tortoise recorded TNT over the course of a year with drummer John McEntire acting as producer, editor and mixing. Taking influence from their remix material of the 1990s, the band recorded the album using hard disk technology in a "forward-then-back" approach, with members individually adding parts to tracks at different stages until the tracks were completed. As with previous albums, the band members also shared instrumental roles.

Largely jettisoning the dub and electronic leanings of their previous work, TNT steered the band in a new, more organic direction with a heavier influence taken from jazz, groove, and minimal music. The influence of electronic music remains on the album, however, alongside other styles such as funk, ambient and the band's ongoing krautrock influence. The album was critically acclaimed upon its release, with reviewers praising its postmodern sound; in the years since, it has come to be regarded as a classic of the post-rock genre and has been named as one of the best albums of the 1990s. The band toured in promotion of the album in 1998, bringing new, live arrangements to the previously studio-crafted songs.

== Background ==
Tortoise's critically acclaimed second album Millions Now Living Will Never Die (1996) established the band as a defining, largely-instrumental post-rock band, and placed high underground anticipation on TNT. Shortly before recording TNT, the band "linked themselves with the cream of European electronica" to "remix the album on a series of 12" singles." Through these releases, it was apparent the band's "reliance on studio engineering" was growing.

In late 1996, shortly before work commenced on TNT, Jeff Parker, who had played in several jazz ensembles, joined the band as a second guitarist to play alongside David Pajo, who had been in the band for several years. John Bush of AllMusic stated that the addition of Parker cemented Tortoise's "musicianship as well as their connections to Chicago's fertile jazz/avant-garde scene."

== Writing and production ==
TNT was recorded from November 1996 – November 1997 and produced, edited and mixed by the band's drummer John McEntire at his Soma Electronic Music Studios in the band's native Chicago, except for "Ten-Day Interval" and "Four-Day Interval", which the band recorded in another Chicago studio, Idful Music.

"I don't think we played anything simultaneously: every single element was overdubbed. Somebody would put down an idea, loop it, or whatever, somebody would come in and lay something else down and then go back and work on the arrangement some more, and then somebody else would come in... it was this sort of piecemeal, forward-then-back-a-little approach."

— John McEntire, speaking about the recording of TNT in 2011.

TNT was "pieced together in the studio"; inspired by their recent remixing endeavors, Tortoise "sought to work the remixing aesthetic into the recording process, which utilized nonlinear hard-disc studio technology." McEntire explained "I think that there was a tendency to not want to do the sort of remix frenzy that we've been known for in the past, because it's becoming a sort of a cliche. I think those ideas are still extremely valid, but it's just become this sort of marketing tool, rather than a creative endeavor. We left the material really open. And we spent so long working on the record that by the time the tracks were finished they had gone through so many permutations that it really was like each track had been mixed and remixed several times." He and Tortoise made a greater use of MIDI on the album than they would later in the band's career.

Rolling Stone's Ben Ratliff felt the album's "mixture of jamming, electronics and extensive post-editing" was McEntire's conception, whereas Bush commented there was only a small amount of post-production on the record, "and those so complementary and subdued that they rarely even sound like effects." Ratliff described McEntire's mixing on the album as "upside down, with bass eclipsing guitar eclipsing organ." After the completion of TNT, David Pajo left the band in order to prioritize his solo project Aerial M.

== Musical style ==
TNT is a departure from the more dub and electronic-laden sound of the band's previous work, instead displaying heavier jazz influences, a more dense, organic and ethereal sound, and a larger emphasis on groove and song-orientation. John Bush of AllMusic described the album as "a record of post-modern cool jazz" that only features slight elements of "the dub, krautrock and electronics" that characterized Millions Now Living Will Never Die. Similarly, the NME said TNT shows the band exploring jazz fusion. Meanwhile, Brent DiCrescenzo of Pitchfork said the record is "a hand-glide ride through modern post-rock, jazz, indie rock, subtle techno, funk and international flavors." William Morris of the same webzine later said the album's "confluence of avant-garde jazz, indie rock and minimalist lite-techno" lead it to becoming an easy listening album.

Containing more elaborate compositions than on prior Tortoise albums, TNT also expands the band's instrumentation, with new instruments used including violin, cornet, bassoon, trombone and cello, which are employed for timbral colors on the album, rather than for solos. Some of the strings and horns on the record are performed by Sara P. Smith and Rob Mazurek of Tortoise's side-project band Isotope 217. McEntire explained, "somebody had the idea of those other voices playing some lines. We've always been interested in trying to include a lot of sounds and textures in the music. It seemed like a pretty natural thing to bring in all those outside people and do it that way." In an interview with Billboard he stated the band's focus had shifted towards emphasising treble, and he felt an urge for the band to use mallet instruments on TNT, especially the marimba, "in ways that were different from the past. It's a hard line to walk with that, but we tried to do it." Parker's guitar work is clean and explores single-note melodies, taking the band's music back to "a more rock-based structure."

The music is characterized by subtle alterations in sound, shifting arrangements, walking bass lines, noise, contemplative melodies and fusion percussion which incorporates reverberating snare drums. Despite the band's new direction, TNT does bear similarities to the band's previous work through its "distant feedback, restrained drones, lightly-brushed drums and ticking breakbeats." According to CMJ New Music Monthly, "pieces of one track drift subtly through others, and the whole things moves like a postmodern dreamscape, mixing and remixing scraps of sense, condensing and displacing them to form an eerie and volatile composite." The Wire said the album "builds up discreetly in layers and mostly build in no apparent direction."

Rolling Stone said the band's influences are more clear on TNT than on previous records, citing "Steve Reich's marimba rhythms, dub's sonic teasing, Can's mesmerizing locomotion, Ennio Morricone's rugged surf-guitar melodies." CMJ, meanwhile, said TNT "calls to mind everything from Derek Bailey's angular improv to lite bossa nova, Pink Floyd-ish space rock to techno and drum 'n' bass, Herbie Hancock's electro-funk to Astor Piazzolla's nuevo tango." Meanwhile, the band's increased interest in jazz on TNT is said to be in "the tradition of the Art Ensemble of Chicago and its compatriots in the Association for the Advancement of Creative Musicians (of which Parker is a member.)" Comparisons were made between TNT and Stereolab's Dots and Loops (1997) and Mike Oldfield's Tubular Bells (1973).

== Compositions ==
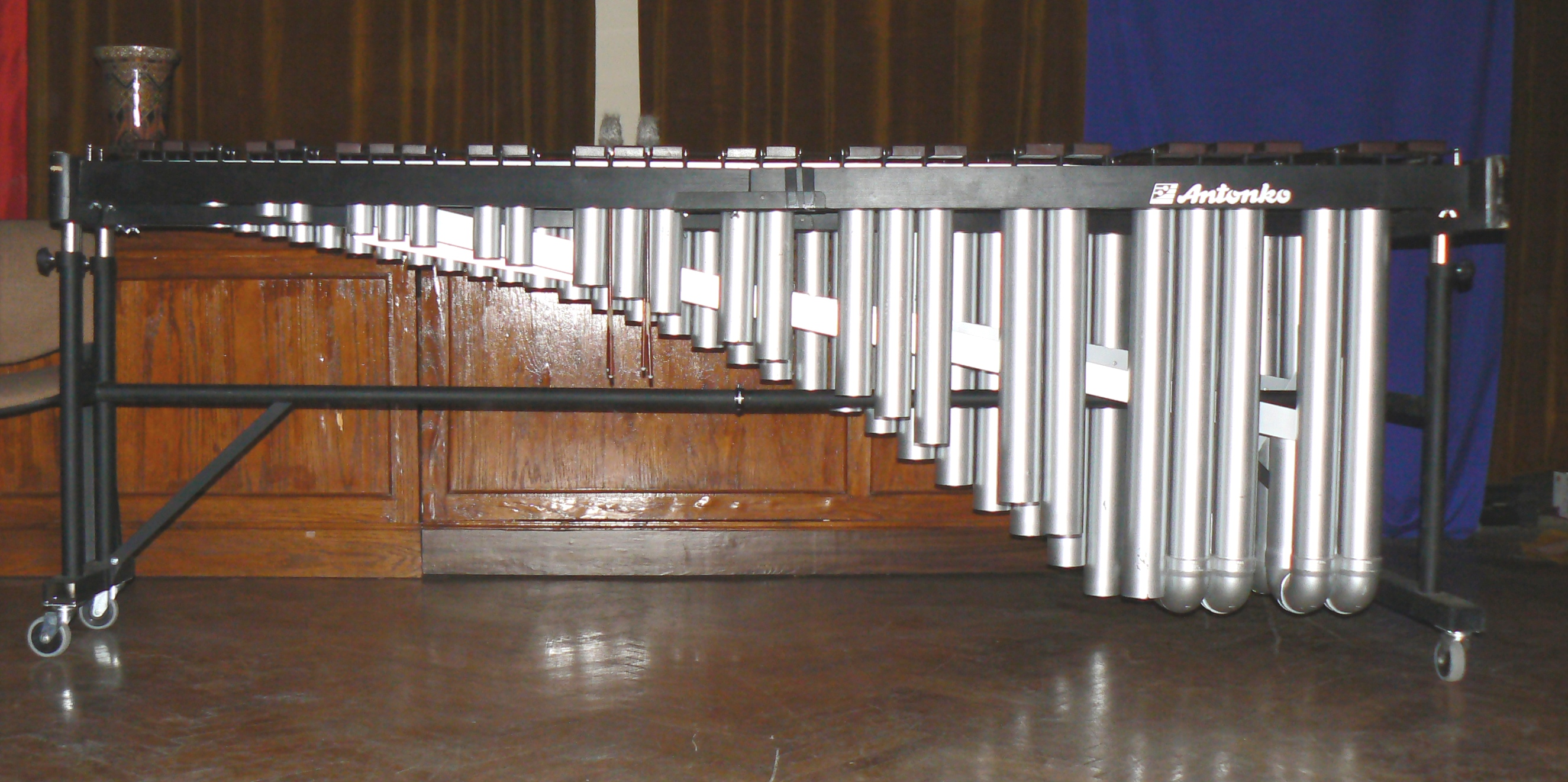
John McEntire provides a drone on "Ten-Day Interval" using a marimba, an instrument whose usage he urged on the album.

Opening track "TNT" is said to display both the album's cool jazz sound "from the first few seconds" and organic groove in its opening minutes. Bush, describing the former scenario, said: "a lazy, slightly free drum solo frames a few tentative guitar chords and some teased effects, before the band kicks in with a holds-barred jam that encompasses a tremulous solo from trumpeter Rob Mazurek." Pitchfork's William Morris, describing the arrival of the groove meanwhile, described it as follows: "fragmented loose drum forms slowly take shape behind scattered angular guitar chords, only to fall perfectly in line for a subdued, but determined, steady full-circuit instrumental jam." The track has been described as a "venture into a Miles Davies Bitches Brew-style jazz", as has "Swung from the Gutters", which is krautrock-influenced.

"Ten-Day Interval" is influenced by minimalism, and features "Oriental repetition." The track features McEntire playing a "pattering" marimba in such a fashion that it "becomes a drone element," whilst "the piano carries a distant melody." "I Set My Face to the Hillside" features a "Spaghetti Western-style riff" and atmospherics that have been compared to Ennio Morricone. "The Suspension Bridge at Iguazu Falls" is "guitar-driven Latino rock." The track "In Sarah, Mencken, Christ, and Beethoven There Were Women and Men", which has been described as "smooth, Ry Cooder-infused house", takes its title from a similarly titled work by John Barton Wolgamot recorded by Robert Ashley in 1972. The consecutive tracks "Almost Always Is Nearly Enough" and "Jetty" largely forgo the jazz influences and instead present "cut-up voices, brittle drum'n'bass rhythms and ricocheting electronics." "Jetty" is an alternate version of 1997 song "La Jeteé" by Tortoise's jazzier sister group, Isotope 217 (Both songs took their name from landmark experimental film La jetée.) They are followed by the "mesmerizing tone" of closing track "Everglade".

== Release and promotion ==
Media interest in TNT was relatively high prior to its release; American publications such as Billboard and British publications such as The Sunday Times, The Wire and The Face ran features on the band and the album. The band's labels and distributors had relatively high commercial hopes for the album; Alternative Distribution Alliance, who distribute the band's American record label Thrill Jockey to major chains, set up programs to promote and deliver TNT in outlets such as Best Buy, Borders, Tower Records and Barnes & Noble. Interest for the band had also grown in France; Betti Richards, Thrill Jockey's owner, said "France's market has always been a bit slow, but this time it seems like its going to blow up".

TNT was released by Thrill Jockey on March 10, 1998. In the United Kingdom, the album was released by City Slang, whereas in Japan, where the album was expected to sell 15,000 copies and carried a bonus remix of the title track by Nobukazu Takemura, it was released by Tokuma Japan Communications. The cover art is simply a doodle made by a band member on a CD-R cover insert during the recording sessions. The album generally met target sales, with its success accredited to college radio. Richards told Billboard in March 1998, "we service about 200 [college] stations, and they've always done well. Up until about two months ago, we didn't have anybody doing anything with college radio–we just sent 'em the records. It charts naturally on its own." Though no standard singles were released from TNT, techno pioneer Derrick Carter remixed material from the album for a limited edition release.

Tortoise underwent a five-month world tour in promotion of the album, beginning in Europe in April 1998. As the material on TNT was arranged over a long period of time in the studio, the band had to rearrange the songs for the tour; CMJ described it as "the curious position of having to learn its songs from the record–to "cover" them as it were–highlighting the postmodern reversal that turns live performance into a stimulation of the recorded original, the real into a copy of the virtual." McEntire told the magazine that "none of these songs were really played by the group together at one point ever, which is why we're having such a hard time now trying to learn them to play them live. It gets even more confusing because a lot of the stuff that's recorded was just done on a whim and you can't even remember what it is or who played it."

== Critical reception ==
Professional ratings
Review scores
Source	Rating
AllMusic	4.5/5 stars
Chicago Sun-Times	3.5/4 stars
Chicago Tribune	3.5/4 stars
Houston Chronicle	3/5 stars
The Independent	4/5 stars
Muzik	9/10
NME	4/10
Pitchfork	9.0/10
Rolling Stone	4/5 stars
Uncut	4/5 stars

Critical reaction to TNT was positive. Chicago Tribune critic Greg Kot found that despite eschewing "vocals, narrative or conventional pop-song structure... the subtle logic of these compositions is revealed as tiny melodies surface and return, and the textures fan out as though part of a slow-motion sonic kaleidoscope". Chiedo Nkwocha of Vibe said, "rising above the current stale state of instrumental rock, TNT explodes." Brent DiCrescenzo of Pitchfork considered TNT "one of the top LPs of 1998 so far", as did The Independent's Angela Lewis, who praised it as "brain food, utterly lacking in cynicism". Rolling Stone's Ben Ratliff concluded that "TNT meanders, but it's a meandering expertly defined by the editing razor." Andrea Moed of CMJ was favorable, saying "TNT contains more musical ideas than either rock or electronica has yielded in several years. What's more, a decent percentage of them are good ones." James Sullivan of the Houston Chronicle compared the music to "a soundtrack without a movie; if you're sitting peacefully, any window will do". Less savory was James Oldham of the NME, who deemed the album "an admirable collection of jazz-tinged instrumentals... that says nothing and means even less."

Retrospective reviews have been favourable, with AllMusic's John Bush writing that, "instead of forcing studio experimentation to become an end to itself, the band mastered – with a single, deft statement – the far more difficult lesson of making technology work for the music." In Music USA: The Rough Guide, TNT is positively reviewed as skirting "the division between easy-to-digest ambient chill music and postmodern exotica." Uncut hailed the album as "a masterpiece: not at all avant-garde, just an hour of wonderful and timeless music." In 2019, Pitchfork's Mark Richardson wrote that the album was "weirdly beautiful and impossible... a place where the musical values of the past (instrumental proficiency, deliberate composition) met the digital future".

In their lists of the best albums of 1998, TNT was ranked 12th by Magic, 32nd by Spex, 37th by Les Inrockuptibles and 58th by Muzik, and was also included in the unordered lists of 1998's best albums by Magnet and The Wire. The New York Times' Neil Strauss ranked the album as the 5th best of 1998. In 2003, Pitchfork ranked the album at number 91 in its list of the "Top 100 Albums of the 1990s", with William Morris saying that "TNT was like a hypnotic snowglobe that refused to settle without ever having required shaking. Tortoise showcased their musicians' talents with an improviser's bent." Rockdelux included the album in their list of the 500 greatest albums from 1984–2014.

== Track listing ==
No.	Title	Length
1.	"TNT"	7:33
2.	"Swung from the Gutters"	5:52
3.	"Ten-Day Interval"	4:44
4.	"I Set My Face to the Hillside"	6:08
5.	"The Equator"	3:42
6.	"A Simple Way to Go Faster Than Light That Does Not Work"	3:33
7.	"The Suspension Bridge at Iguazú Falls"	5:38
8.	"Four-Day Interval"	4:45
9.	"In Sarah, Mencken, Christ, and Beethoven There Were Women and Men"	7:29
10.	"Almost Always Is Nearly Enough"	2:42
11.	"Jetty"	8:21
12.	"Everglade"	4:21

Japanese edition bonus track
No.	Title	Length
13.	"TNT" (Nobukazu Takemura Remix)	10:05

== Personnel ==
Credits adapted from liner notes.

Tortoise

- Dan Bitney – performer, programming
- David Pajo – performer
- Douglas McCombs – performer
- Jeff Parker – performer
- John Herndon – performer, programming
- John McEntire – performer, recording engineer, editing, mixing

Additional personnel

- Caitlin Hormson – bassoon
- Popahna Brandes – cello
- Rob Mazurek – cornet
- Sara P. Smith – trombone
- Julie Liu – violin
- Roger Seibel – mastering
- Sheila Sachs – layout assistance
- Tortoise – sleeve design

== Charts ==
Chart (1998)	Peak position
UK Albums (Official Charts)	76
UK Independent Albums (Official Charts)	8
US Heatseekers Albums (Billboard)	25
