= A Lazarus Taxon =

Box set by Tortoise
- Released: August 21, 2006
- Recorded: 1993–2005
- Genre: Post-rock
- Length: 179:29
- Label: Thrill Jockey

Tortoise chronology
The Brave and the Bold (2006)	A Lazarus Taxon (2006)	Beacons of Ancestorship (2009)

Professional ratings
Review scores
Source	Rating
AllMusic	4/5 stars
Baltimore City Paper	favorable
Drowned in Sound	5/10
Harp	favorable
Pitchfork	9.2/10
The Stranger	4/5 stars
Stylus Magazine	A
Time Out	4/6
URB	3.5/5 stars

A Lazarus Taxon is a box set by Chicago post-rock group Tortoise, released in 2006 on Thrill Jockey.

== Release ==
The set contains three CDs, one DVD and an accompanying 20-page booklet. The CDs contain 33 tracks of hard-to-find material from tour, compilation and non-American releases. The band's out of print 1995 album Rhythms, Resolutions & Clusters, compiled of remixes by friends of the band including Steve Albini, Rick Brown, Jim O'Rourke and Brad Wood features as well. Also in the set is other previously unreleased material including a restored remix by the Minutemen's Mike Watt that was delivered too late for inclusion on Rhythms... and subsequently fell victim to a malfunctioning DAT machine. Tortoise bassist Bundy K Brown himself restored the tape, twelve years after it was recorded. The DVD contains most of the band's music videos as well as over two hours of "extensive and rare" live performance footage. The set was compiled by the band themselves.

The set's title is derived from the palaeontological term "lazarus taxon", meaning a taxon (or grouping of organisms) that disappears from the fossil record only to reappear again at a later point, which in turn refers back to the resurrection of Lazarus by Jesus in the New Testament.

== Track listing ==
All tracks written by Tortoise except where noted.

=== Disc 1 (CD) ===
1. "Gamera" – 11:53
2. "The Source of Uncertainty" – 3:42
3. "Blackbird" – 5:01
4. "Sexual for Elizabeth" (Shingo Annen/Dan Bitney/John Herndon/Patrick Johnson/Jon Marshall/Doug McCombs/John McEntire/Jeff Parker) – 4:49
  - Tortoise remix of "Sexual for Elizabeth" by Five Deez
5. "To Day Retrieval" – 3:58
  - Autechre remix of "Ten-Day Interval"
6. "Whitewater" (John McEntire) – 5:07
7. "Didjeridoo" (Duke Ellington) – 4:33
  - Tortoise cover version of a Duke Ellington piece
8. "Autumn Sweater" (Georgia Hubley/Ira Kaplan/James McNew) – 7:07
  - Tortoise remix of a Yo La Tengo song
9. "Wait" (Jeff Parker) – 4:27
10. "A Grape Dope" – 4:12
11. "Restless Waters" – 3:41
12. "Vaus" – 5:01
13. "Blue Station" (Doug McCombs/Curtis Roads) – 5:34

=== Disc 2 (CD) ===
1. "Madison Area" – 3:27
2. "TNT" – 10:03
  - Nobukazu Takemura remix
3. "Why We Fight" – 4:23
4. "Elmerson, Lincoln, and Palmieri" – 2:39
5. "Peering" – 5:11
6. "Goriri" – 6:40
7. "As You Said" (Ian Curtis/Bernard Sumner/Peter Hook/Steve Morris) – 4:21
  - Tortoise cover version of a Joy Division song
8. "CTA" – 5:07
9. "Deltitnu" – 5:50
10. "Adverse Camber" – 6:00
  - A different Autechre remix of "Ten-Day Interval"
11. "Cliff Dweller Society" (Dan Bitney/Bundy K. Brown/Dan Fliegel/John Herndon/Doug McCombs/John McEntire) – 15:23
12. "Waihopai" – 4:13

=== Disc 3 (CD) ===
Tracks 1–7 previously issued as Rhythms, Resolutions & Clusters (1995).

1. "Alcohall" – 4:03
  - John McEntire remix of "On Noble"
2. "Your New Rod" – 4:18
  - Rick Brown remix of "Flyrod"
3. "Cobwebbed" – 4:38
  - Casey Rice remix of "Spiderwebbed"
4. "The Match Incident" – 5:31
  - Steve Albini remix of "Ry Cooder"
5. "Tin Can Puerto Rican Remix" – 4:24
  - Brad Wood remix of "Tin Cans and Twine"
6. "Not Quite East of the Ryan" – 5:08
  - Bundy K. Brown remix of "Spiderwebbed" plus elements from other tracks
7. "Initial Gesture Protraction" – 4:47
  - Jim O'Rourke remix of "His Second Story Island"
8. "Cornpone Brunch Watt Remix" – 4:18
  - Mike Watt remix of "Cornpone Brunch" featuring extra bass guitars by Mike Watt and Kira Roeseler
9. "Jetty_99" – 5:48
  - iTunes bonus track

=== Disc 4 (DVD) ===
1. "Salt the Skies" (video)
2. "Dear Grandma and Grandpa" (video)
3. "Glass Museum" (video)
4. "Seneca" (video)
5. "Four Day Interval" (video)
6. "The Suspension Bridge at Iguazú Falls" (video)
7. "Monica" (video)
  - Live at Primavera Sound, 2005
8. "Gamera"/"Glass Museum"/"Reservoir"/"Djed"/"The Equator"/"Vaus"/"Cornpone Brunch"
  - Live in Toronto, 1996
9. "Ten Day Interval"/"Othello"
  - Live at Deutsches Jazz Festival, 1999
10. "Seneca"
  - Live on "Chic-a-Go-Go", 2005
11. "Salt the Skies"
  - Live for "Burn to Shine", 2004

== Personnel ==
=== Performance ===
- Dan Bitney
- Bundy K. Brown
- John Herndon
- Doug McCombs
- John McEntire
- David Pajo – guitar
- Jeff Parker
- Kira Roessler – bass guitar
- Mike Watt – bass guitar
- Shing02 – rapping

=== Production ===
- Steve Albini – production
- Sean Booth – remixing
- Rick Brown – remixing
- Rob Brown – remixing
- Brendan Canty – remixing
- Dan Fliegel – composer
- Lenny Golzalez – photography
- Baldomero Gordillo – liner notes
- Christopher Green – direction
- Georgia Hubley – composer
- Fat Jon – composer, lyrics
- Ira Kaplan – composer
- Alan Licht – liner notes
- James McNew – composer
- Arnold Odermatt – cover art, photography, sleeve photo
- Jim O'Rourke – remixing
- Pace Rock – composer, lyrics
- Andrew Paynter – photography
- Marty Perez – photography
- Casey Rice – remixing
- Sheila Sachs – design
- Nobukazu Takemura – remixing
- Saverio Truglia – photography
- Mike Watt – remixing
- Julian Weber – liner notes
- Brad Wood – remixing

== Charts ==
Chart	Peak position
US Heatseekers Albums (Billboard)	42
US Independent Albums (Billboard)	42
