= Viewfinder (album) =

Studio album by Pullman
- Released: August 21, 2001
- Recorded: Summer 2000
- Genre: Acoustic rock, folk, alternative folk
- Length: 53:45
- Label: Thrill Jockey
- Producer: Ken Brown

Pullman chronology
Turnstyles & Junkpiles (1998)	Viewfinder (2001)

Professional ratings
Review scores
Source	Rating
AllMusic	4/5 stars
All About Jazz	Positive
Pitchfork	5/10 stars

Viewfinder is Pullman's second album, the follow-up to 1998's Turnstyles & Junkpiles.

== Background ==
Recorded, mixed and edited by Ken Brown in the summer 2000 at Soma Electronic Music Studio in Chicago, Illinois, Viewfinder was released on August 21, 2001, by Thrill Jockey. The album was digitally mastered by Roger Seibel at SAE Mastering, Phoenix, Arizona.

== Track listing ==
All songs written and performed by Chris Brokaw, Ken Brown, Curtis Harvey and Doug McCombs, with Tim Barnes, except as indicated.

No.	Title	Writer(s)	Performer	Length
1.	"Same Grain With New Wood"			4:49
2.	"Delta One"	Brokaw	Brokaw	2:51
3.	"Or, Otherwise"			4:23
4.	"Forty Fingers"			3:35
5.	"FLT"			3:05
6.	"Hatah"	Harvey and Brown	Harvey and Brown	1:45
7.	"Isla Mujeres"			4:56
8.	"Chicken Smoked Blanket"			7:58
9.	"Bookends"	Brown	Brown	0:51
10.	"Felucca"			3:18
11.	"Quantum Mechanic"	Brokaw and McCombs		2:28
12.	"Narrow Canyon"			4:22
13.	"Street Light"	McCombs	McCombs	2:26
14.	"Wire and One Good Shoe"	Harvey		2:12
15.	"Brewster Road"	Brokaw		4:46
Total length:				53:45

== Personnel ==
- Chris Brokaw – Nylon String Guitar, electric guitar, Slide Guitar, Electric Bass Guitar, Percussion, Whistling
- Ken Brown – Acoustic Guitars, Electric guitars, E-Bow
- Curtis Harvey – Acoustic Guitars, Electric guitars, Electric Bass Guitar, Bazouki, Fender Bass VI, Accordion, Mountain Dulcimer
- Doug McCombs – Acoustic Bass Guitars, Electric Bass Guitars, Double Bass, Nylon String Guitar, electric guitar, Clavioline, Dobro, Lap Steel

with

- Tim Barnes – Drum kit, Percussion, Sea Shanty

Additional personnel

- Ken Brown – Producer
- Curtis Harvey – Photography and Design
- Sheila Sachs – Additional Layout
