= The Relatives (album) =

Studio album by Jeff Parker
- Released: January 25, 2005
- Recorded: January 2004
- Studio: Soma
- Genre: Jazz
- Length: 40:47
- Label: Thrill Jockey

Jeff Parker chronology
Like-Coping (2003)	The Relatives (2005)	The New Breed (2016)

The Relatives is a studio album by American guitarist Jeff Parker. It was released on January 25, 2005, through Thrill Jockey.

== Background ==
Jeff Parker is an American guitarist. The Relatives contains performances by Parker, pianist Sam Barsheshet, bassist Chris Lopes, and drummer Chad Taylor. It was recorded at Soma in January 2004.

The album opens with a Chad Taylor-written song, "Istanbul". "Mannerisms" and "Rang" are written by Jeff Parker, while "Sea Change", "Beanstalk", and "Toy Boat" are written by Chris Lopes. "The Relative" is written by Parker and Matthew Lux. The album includes a cover version of Marvin Gaye's "When Did You Stop Loving Me, When Did I Stop Loving You".

The album was released on January 25, 2005, through Thrill Jockey.

== Critical reception ==
Professional ratings
Review scores
Source	Rating
AllMusic	4.5/5 stars
Cokemachineglow	77%
Pitchfork	7.4/10
PopMatters	7/10 stars
Spectrum Culture	90%
Stylus Magazine	B+

Matthew Murphy of Pitchfork stated, "As with his work in Tortoise and Isotope 217, Parker's playing as a bandleader is virtually egoless, and on The Relatives he remains steadfast in his willingness to temper and subordinate his instrument's voice in the broader interests of the group at large." Sean Westergaard of AllMusic commented that "These guys are not just great players, they're great listeners, and The Relatives perfectly balances the gentle and tuneful with the added spark of the band's collective improvisational skills."

Nick Follett of XLR8R wrote, "Parker has created what jazz has needed for a long time: a populist record with enough substance for the haughtiest jazz snob and enough style to keep it interesting." David M. Goldstein of Cokemachineglow commented that "The Relatives is simply a fine collection of straight-up jazz guitar songs: far more traditionalist than what we've come to expect from Thrill Jockey label, but no less high in quality." Tim O'Neil of PopMatters called the album "a wonderful disc, ranging freely through the fields of the last fifty years of jazz while keeping their feet planted firmly in the present."

== Track listing ==
The Relatives track listing
No.	Title	Writer(s)	Length
1.	"Istanbul"	Chad Taylor	3:25
2.	"Mannerisms"	Jeff Parker	6:06
3.	"Sea Change"	Chris Lopes	3:31
4.	"When Did You Stop Loving Me, When Did I Stop Loving You"	Marvin Gaye	6:26
5.	"Beanstalk"	Lopes	3:26
6.	"The Relative"	Parker; Matthew Lux	5:55
7.	"Toy Boat"	Lopes	5:00
8.	"Rang" (for Michael Zerang)	Parker	6:58
Total length:			40:47

== Personnel ==
Credits adapted from liner notes.

- Jeff Parker – electric guitar
- Sam Barsheshet – Fender Rhodes electric piano, Wurlitzer electric piano
- Chris Lopes – acoustic bass, electric guitar, acoustic guitar, C flute, percussion
- Chad Taylor – drums, percussion
- John McEntire – engineering, mixing
- Roger Seibel – mastering
- Sheila Sachs – design
