= Happyness =

Studio album by The Aluminum Group
- Released: 15 October 2002
- Studios: Kingsize Soundlabs; Soma Electronic Music Studios
- Genre: Indie pop
- Label: Wishing Tree Records
- Producers: Frank Navin, John Navin

Happyness is a 2002 studio album by The Aluminum Group, released by Wishing Tree Records. Upon release, the album received generally positive reviews, with critics praising the lyricism and songwriting, and comparing the album's sound to indie pop, art pop and sophisti-pop.

== Background and recording ==
Happyness was the first in a trilogy of releases, succeeded by the 2003 album Morehappyness and 2008 album Little Happyness. Band members and brothers John and Frank Navin stated that the songs in the series were written with a central theme of happiness in mind with the aim to "examine our lives and how we make our way" and "what is it when we ask ourselves, or others, 'are you happy?'". The album featured several guest performers, including from Rebecca Gates of The Spinanes, John McEntire and Doug McCombs of Tortoise, and Rob Mazurek of Isotope 217.

== Critical reception ==
Professional ratings
Review scores
Source	Rating
Allmusic	4/5
Pitchfork	8.0
Rolling Stone	3/5
Uncut	4/5

According to review aggregator Metacritic, Happyness received "generally favorable" reviews from critics. Allmusic praised the music as "postmodernist pop that sounds simultaneously cutting edge, retro and utterly timeless". Similarly, Pitchfork considered the album was an evolution upon previous releases, writing that the music "is just so precise and fitted together so perfectly", describing it as "smart pop music that hits all the right notes". Despite describing the band's music as "hard to get excited about" due to it being "innocuous" and "squeaky-clean", PopMatters nonetheless found the lyrics clever. Rolling Stone considered the album "clever" and that it merged a "plainitive indie sound" that fused with influences such as Steely Dan, Elliott Smith and Air. The Village Voice found the album thematically less ambitious than previous releases, but felt by "inhabiting form and genre so thoroughly", the band were able to create dissonance between the music and the lyrical content.

== Track listing ==
Happyness track listing
No.	Title	Length
1.	"Tiny Decision"	3:49
2.	"I Blow You Kisses"	2:58
3.	"Pop"	3:24
4.	"Two Lights"	3:41
5.	"We're Both Hiding"	6:02
6.	"Kid"	2:56
7.	"Speed Dial"	3:54
8.	"Oxygen"	3:59
9.	"Be Killed"	2:39
10.	"Stroke"	4:15

== Personnel ==
- Frank Navin – vocals, production, recording, arrangement, writing
- John Navin – vocals, production, recording, writing
- John McEntire – mixing, recording, performer
- Roger Seibel – mastering
