= Tortoise (album) =

Studio album by Tortoise
- Released: 1994
- Recorded: November 29–December 5, 1993
- Genre: Post-rock
- Length: 50:03
- Label: Thrill Jockey
- Producer: Tortoise

Tortoise chronology
Tortoise (1994)	Rhythms, Resolutions & Clusters (1995)

Tortoise is the debut studio album by American post-rock band Tortoise. It was released in 1994 via Thrill Jockey. It received positive reviews from critics.

By March 1998, Tortoise had sold 35,000 copies (8,000 LPs and 27,000 CDs).

== Reception ==
Professional ratings
Review scores
Source	Rating
AllMusic	4.5/5 stars
Chicago Tribune	3.5/4 stars
The Encyclopedia of Popular Music	3/5 stars
Melody Maker	4.5/5 stars
(The New) Rolling Stone Album Guide	3/5 stars
Uncut	4/5 stars

Trouser Press noted that "the beckoning warmth of the gently shifting rhythms ... make it easy to forget that there's nary a whit of guitar and only the briefest whiff of standard-issue keyboards in play." In his review for AllMusic, Glenn Swan writes that Tortoise "share equal responsibility and trust in each other, pouring out a thick stew of meditative grooves, light production experiments, and rusty guitar-string ambience -- the likes of which have rarely sounded so approachable, but this is not to say the album is a sellout leap into commercialism. There are a couple head scratchers and murky moments that fail to make much of an impact, but the quintet have spun such a rich web of mood and personality that any fall from grace barely changes altitude".

== Track listing ==
All tracks are written by Tortoise (Dan Bitney, Bundy K. Brown, John Herndon, Douglas McCombs and John McEntire).

No.	Title	Length
1.	"Magnet Pulls Through"	4:37
2.	"Night Air"	3:50
3.	"Ry Cooder"	7:04
4.	"Onions Wrapped in Rubber"	6:40
5.	"Tin Cans & Twine"	4:20
6.	"Spiderwebbed"	8:33
7.	"His Second Story Island"	2:41
8.	"On Noble"	4:05
9.	"Flyrod"	3:29
10.	"Cornpone Brunch"	4:44
Total length:		50:03

== Personnel ==
Credits for Tortoise adapted from album liner notes.

Tortoise

- Dan Bitney
- Bundy K. Brown
- John Herndon
- Douglas McCombs
- John McEntire

Production

- Bundy K. Brown – recording (assistant), mixing (assistant)
- John McEntire – recording, mixing
- Tortoise – arrangement, production

Artwork and design

- Sam Prekop – cover design
