= Turnstyles & Junkpiles =

Studio album by Pullman
- Released: August 11, 1998
- Recorded: 1997
- Genre: Acoustic rock, folk, alternative folk
- Length: 42:01
- Label: Thrill Jockey
- Producer: Ken Brown; Chris Brokaw; Curtis Harvey

Pullman chronology
Turnstyles & Junkpiles (1998)	Viewfinder (2001)

Professional ratings
Review scores
Source	Rating
AllMusic	3/5 stars
NME	6/10 stars
CMJ New Music Monthly	Positive
Spin	7/10 stars
Chicago Tribune	Negative

Turnstyles & Junkpiles is the debut album by Pullman. Released on August 11, 1998, by Thrill Jockey, Turnstyles & Junkpiles was recorded live to analog 2-track with two AKG 451-EB microphone in the Cool Blue Cave by Bundy K. Brown in November 1997, with two exceptions: "Two Parts Water" and "Beacon & Kent", which were recorded at home by Curtis Harvey and Chris Brokaw, respectively. The album was edited at Soma Electronic Music Studios in Chicago, Illinois, and mastered by Roger Seibel at SAE Digital & Analog Mastering, in Phoenix, Arizona.

== Critical reception ==
In its review of the album, NME characterized it as "by turns evocative, lyrical and heavy with a submerged sense of unease, like Ry Cooder's soundtrack for Paris, Texas filtered through the minds of distressed rock musicians." In September 2009, Fact magazine placed Turnstyles & Junkpiles at number 3 in its list "20 best: Post-Rock records ever made", going on to describe it as "quiet wonder personified. Heartbreaking and more cockle-warming than an autumn bonfire." In his review for AllMusic, Jonathan Cohen stated that "Turnstyles & Junkpiles is an honest tribute to some of the acoustic guitar's most important innovators," pronouncing it "a perfect soundtrack for an AM spent in lovely dreams". CMJ New Music Monthly stated that Turnstyles and Junkpiles is akin to "a Sunday in the park: Gentle, fingerpicked guitar patterns are the order of the day here"; similarly, Spin magazine declared that "Pullman's pensively paced compositions allow each note to glisten in tranquil isolation."

== Track listing ==
All songs written and performed by Chris Brokaw, Bundy K. Brown, Curtis Harvey and Doug McCombs, except as indicated.

No.	Title	Writer(s)	Performer	Length
1.	"To Hold a Shadow"			3:15
2.	"Barefoot"			2:45
3.	"In a Box, Under the Bed"			4:19
4.	"Sagamore Bridge"			4:32
5.	"Gravenhurst"	David Pajo	Pajo	3:24
6.	"Lyasnya"			2:19
7.	"Two Parts Water"	Harvey	Harvey	2:32
8.	"Beacon & Kent"	Brokaw	Brokaw	3:13
9.	"Deerhill"			3:18
10.	"So Breaks Yesterday"			4:28
11.	"Fullerton"	McCombs	McCombs	1:56
12.	"Sunday Morning Traffic"	Brown	Brown	1:14
13.	"Tall Grass"			3:14
14.	"With Hands"	Brokaw & Harvey	Brokaw & Harvey	1:32
Total length:				42:01

== Personnel ==
- Chris Brokaw
- Bundy K. Brown
- Curtis Harvey
- Doug McCombs

with

- David Pajo

Additional personnel

- Bundy K. Brown – producer
- Curtis Harvey – producer
- Chris Brokaw – producer
- Roger Seibel – mastering
- James Warden – photography
- Sheila Sachs – layout
