= It's All Around You =

Studio album by Tortoise
- Released: April 6, 2004
- Studio: Soma
- Genre: Post-rock; experimental rock; jazz fusion
- Length: 43:37
- Label: Thrill Jockey

Tortoise chronology
Standards (2001)	It's All Around You (2004)	The Brave and the Bold (2006)

It's All Around You is the fifth studio album by American post-rock band Tortoise. It was released on Thrill Jockey in 2004.

== Critical reception ==
Professional ratings
Aggregate scores
Source	Rating
Metacritic	68/100
Review scores
Source	Rating
AllMusic	3/5 stars
Blender	3/5 stars
Entertainment Weekly	B+
The Guardian	3/5 stars
Mojo	3/5 stars
Pitchfork	5.2/10
Q	2/5 stars
Rolling Stone	3/5 stars
Stylus Magazine	C
The Village Voice	(dud)

At Metacritic, which assigns a weighted average score out of 100 to reviews from mainstream critics, the album received an average score of 68% based on 31 reviews, indicating "generally favorable reviews".

In 2011, American rapper Currensy named it one of his 25 favorite albums, stating: "I don’t do major drugs, but it was an acid trip in audio form."

== Track listing ==
All tracks are written by Dan Bitney, John Herndon, Douglas McCombs, John McEntire, Jeff Parker.

No.	Title	Length
1.	"It's All Around You"	4:09
2.	"The Lithium Stiffs"	3:59
3.	"Crest"	4:21
4.	"Stretch (You Are All Right)"	5:14
5.	"Unknown"	5:38
6.	"Dot/Eyes"	3:46
7.	"On the Chin"	5:21
8.	"By Dawn"	1:51
9.	"Five Too Many"	4:33
10.	"Salt the Skies"	4:45
Total length:		43:37

Japanese edition bonus tracks
No.	Title	Length
11.	"Elmerson, Lincoln, & Palmieri"	2:36
12.	"Deltitnu"	5:49
Total length:		52:02

== Charts ==
Chart	Peak position
US Heatseekers Albums (Billboard)	31
US Independent Albums (Billboard)	13
