= In the Fishtank 5 =

EP by Tortoise and The Ex
- Released: 1999
- Recorded: 1998 in the Netherlands
- Genre: Experimental rock; post-rock; ambient
- Length: 22:43
- Label: Konkurrent
- Producer: Zlaya Hadzic

The Ex chronology
Starters Alternators (1998)	In the Fishtank 5 (1999)	Dizzy Spells (2001)

Tortoise chronology
TNT (1998)	In the Fishtank 5 (1999)	Standards (2001)

In the Fishtank chronology
In the Fishtank 4	In the Fishtank 5 (1999)	In the Fishtank 6 (1999)

Professional ratings
Review scores
Source	Rating
Allmusic	3/5 stars
Pitchfork	6.2/10

In the Fishtank 5 is a 1999 EP by Tortoise with The Ex as part of the In the Fishtank project.

== Reception ==
Heather Phares of AllMusic writes, the "six-song EP [...] sometimes blends the bands' divergent styles into a harmonious hybrid, and other times falls victim to stylistic clashes." She singled out the track "Central Heating" as a "noisy, acquired taste". Mark Richardson of Pitchfork called the pairing of the bands "a little odd" and the resulting album "strange and probably pointless in the long run", but wrote that it "does make for a relatively intriguing listen." He noted that "on the bulk of the EP, it seems as though the Ex side of the equation presides."

== Track listing ==
1. "The Lawn of the Limp" – 4:03
2. "Pooh Song (Christopher Robin's Nightbear)" – 4:57
3. "Central Heating" – 2:19
4. "Pleasure as Usual" – 5:03
5. "Did You Comb?" – 2:09
6. "Huge Hidden Spaces" – 4:12

== Personnel ==
Tortoise

- Dan Bitney – percussion, keyboards
- John Herndon – drums, percussion, keyboards
- Douglas McCombs – bass, guitar
- John McEntire – drums, keyboards
- Jeff Parker – guitar, bass
- Rob Mazurek – cornet, keyboards

The Ex

- Andy Ex – guitar
- Katrin Ex – drums, vocals
- Luc Ex – bass
- Terrie Ex – guitar
- G.W. Sok – vocals
