= Millions Now Living Will Never Die =

Studio album by Tortoise
- Released: January 30, 1996
- Recorded: June–September 1995
- Studio: Idful (Chicago); Soma (Chicago)
- Genre: Post-rock; jazz fusion
- Length: 42:56
- Label: Thrill Jockey

Tortoise chronology
Rhythms, Resolutions & Clusters (1995)	Millions Now Living Will Never Die (1996)	TNT (1998)

Singles from Millions Now Living Will Never Die
- 1. "Djed" Released: 1996; 2. "The Taut and Tame" Released: 1996

Millions Now Living Will Never Die is the second studio album by American post-rock band Tortoise. The album was released on January 30, 1996, by Thrill Jockey.

The album's title is a reference to a phrase used by the Jehovah's Witnesses in the 1920s, which was utilized, for instance, as the title of an essay by Joseph Franklin Rutherford, the second president of the Watch Tower Bible and Tract Society.

== Reception ==
Professional ratings
Review scores
Source	Rating
AllMusic	5/5 stars
Alternative Press	5/5
The Encyclopedia of Popular Music	4/5 stars
NME	8/10
Orlando Sentinel	5/5 stars
Record Collector	4/5 stars
The Rolling Stone Album Guide	4/5 stars
Spin	7/10
Uncut	9/10
The Village Voice	B−

Millions Now Living Will Never Die was released to positive critical reviews, and it has since been renowned as a groundbreaking album for the post-rock genre. Outersound wrote that not long after the album's release, the group was "hailed as godfathers of the American 'post-rock' movement". The Wire named it the record of the year in its annual critics' poll and NME named it the 35th best album of 1996.

By March 1998, the album had sold over 50,000 copies, 80% of these being on CD.

In 2006 and 2008, Millions Now Living Will Never Die was performed live in its entirety as part of the All Tomorrow's Parties-curated Don't Look Back concert series. The album also appears in the book 1001 Albums You Must Hear Before You Die.

== Track listing ==
All tracks are written by Tortoise (Dan Bitney, John Herndon, Douglas McCombs, John McEntire and David Pajo), except "The Taut and Tame" by Tortoise and Bundy K. Brown.

No.	Title	Length
1.	"Djed"	20:57
2.	"Glass Museum"	5:27
3.	"A Survey"	2:52
4.	"The Taut and Tame"	5:01
5.	"Dear Grandma and Grandpa"	2:49
6.	"Along the Banks of Rivers"	5:50
Total length:		42:56

Japanese edition bonus tracks
No.	Title	Length
7.	"Gamera"	11:55
8.	"Goriri"	6:39
9.	"Restless Waters"	3:41
Total length:		65:11

2001 reissue Japanese edition bonus track
No.	Title	Length
10.	"A Grape Dope"	4:12
Total length:		69:23

== Personnel ==
Credits for Millions Now Living Will Never Die adapted from album liner notes.

Tortoise

- Dan Bitney
- John Herndon
- Douglas McCombs
- John McEntire
- David Pajo

Production

- John McEntire – mixing, recording
- Roger Seibel – mastering

Artwork and design

- Dan Osborn – layout assistance, "computer magic"
- Tortoise – sleeve design

== Samples ==
The song "Dear Grandma and Grandpa" contains a sample of German band Dom's song "Silence", from their 1972 album Edge of Time.

== Charts ==
Chart (1996)	Peak position
UK Albums (OCC)	115
