= Mighty Vertebrate =

Studio album by Anna Butterss
- Released: 4 October 2024
- Studios: Big Ego; Laundry Works II
- Length: 38:40
- Label: International Anthem
- Producers: Anna Butterss; Ben Lumsdaine

Anna Butterss chronology
Activities (2022)	Mighty Vertebrate (2024)

Mighty Vertebrate is a studio album by Australian bassist and composer Anna Butterss. It was released on 4 October 2024 through International Anthem Recording Company. It received universal acclaim from critics.

== Background ==
Anna Butterss is an Australian bassist and composer from Adelaide and based in Los Angeles, California. Mighty Vertebrate is their second solo album, following Activities (2022). It contains performances by Butterss, Josh Johnson, Gregory Uhlmann, and Ben Lumsdaine. The track "Dance Steve" features a guest appearance from Jeff Parker. The album's artwork is created by John Herndon. A music video was released for the track "Pokemans". The album was released on 4 October 2024 through International Anthem Recording Company.

== Critical reception ==
Professional ratings
Aggregate scores
Source	Rating
Metacritic	81/100
Review scores
Source	Rating
The Observer	4/5 stars
Pitchfork	7.3/10
Uncut	4/5 stars

According to the review aggregator Metacritic, Mighty Vertebrate received "universal acclaim" based on a weighted average score of 81 out of 100 from 5 critic scores.

Kitty Empire of The Observer described the album as "a sparkling, shape-shifting record, created as a series of playful compositional challenges, that defies categorisation." Matthew Blackwell of Pitchfork commented that the band "can seemingly do anything, remarkable in scope but lacking in focus."

== Track listing ==
All tracks are written by Anna Butterss.

Mighty Vertebrate track listing
No.	Title	Length
1.	"Bishop"	3:14
2.	"Shorn"	4:52
3.	"Dance Steve" (featuring Jeff Parker)	4:45
4.	"Ella"	2:13
5.	"Lubbock"	4:07
6.	"Pokemans"	3:05
7.	"Breadrich"	4:08
8.	"Seeing You"	3:45
9.	"Counterpoint"	3:05
10.	"Saturno"	5:26
Total length:		38:40

== Personnel ==
Credits adapted from liner notes.

- Anna Butterss – upright bass, electric bass, guitar, synthesizer, flute, drum machine, production
- Josh Johnson – alto saxophone, effects
- Gregory Uhlmann – guitar, effects
- Jeff Parker – guitar (on "Dance Steve")
- Ben Lumsdaine – drums, percussion, guitar, lap steel guitar, drum programming, production, recording, mixing
- Chris Schlarb – recording
- Scott McNiece – sequencing
- David Allen – mastering
- John Herndon – artwork
- Robbie Jeffers – photography
- Jeremiah Chiu – layout

== Charts ==
Chart performance for Mighty Vertebrate
Chart (2024)	Peak position
UK Album Downloads (Official Charts)	89
