= Touch (Tortoise album) =

Studio album by Tortoise
- Released: October 24, 2025
- Studios: Flora Recording & Playback (Portland, Oregon); 64 Sound (Los Angeles, California); Electrical Audio (Chicago, Illinois)
- Genre: Post-rock
- Length: 38:53
- Labels: International Anthem; Nonesuch

Tortoise chronology
The Catastrophist (2016)	Touch (2025)

Singles from Touch
- 1. "Oganesson" Released: March 27, 2025

Touch is the eighth studio album by American post-rock band Tortoise. It was released on October 24, 2025, through International Anthem Recording Company and Nonesuch Records. It received universal acclaim from critics.

== Background ==
Tortoise consists of Dan Bitney, John Herndon, Douglas McCombs, John McEntire, and Jeff Parker. Touch is a follow-up to The Catastrophist (2016). It was recorded between the three cities where the band's members live: Los Angeles, California; Portland, Oregon; and Chicago, Illinois. It features contributions from Marta Sofia Honer, Skip VonKuske, and Tucker Martine.

On March 27, 2025, Tortoise released "Oganesson" as the lead single from Touch. On June 24, 2025, the band released Oganesson Remixes, an EP consisting of the original version of "Oganesson" and five remixes of the track by Saul Williams, Heba Kadry, Patrick Carney, Broken Social Scene, and Makaya McCraven. The album was released on October 24, 2025, through International Anthem Recording Company and Nonesuch Records.

Music videos were released for "Oganesson", "Layered Presence", "Works and Days", "A Title Comes", and "Rated OG".

== Critical reception ==
Professional ratings
Aggregate scores
Source	Rating
AnyDecentMusic?	7.1/10
Metacritic	81/100
Review scores
Source	Rating
AllMusic	4/5 stars
Exclaim!	7/10
Jazzwise	3/5 stars
Mojo	4/5 stars
Pitchfork	7.6/10
PopMatters	9/10
Record Collector	4/5 stars
Spectrum Culture	68%
Uncut	4/5 stars
Under the Radar	7/10

According to the review aggregator Metacritic, Touch received "universal acclaim" based on a weighted average score of 81 out of 100 from 12 critic scores.

Jeremy Levine of PopMatters described the album as "A cinematic record that is profoundly human and entirely spectral." Heather Phares of AllMusic commented that "all of Touch reflects the curiosity that has driven Tortoise since the beginning -- and still drives them all these years later." Meanwhile, Levi Dayan of The Quietus wrote, "even at its heights, Touch is always undermined by clashing musical elements, bland production and a general sense of awkwardness." Eric Hill of Exclaim! stated, "If Touch were the first album by a brand new band, it would likely be judged as an unequivocal triumph — but Tortoise suffer from the burden of their iconic back catalogue."

=== Accolades ===
Year-end lists for Touch
Publication	List	Rank	Ref.
AllMusic	AllMusic Best of 2025	—	
Mojo	The 75 Best Albums of 2025	60	
PopMatters	The 30 Best Rock Albums of 2025	18	
Uncut	Top 50 New Albums of 2025	22	
The Wire	Releases of the Year (2025 Rewind)	10	

== Track listing ==
All tracks are written by Tortoise.

Touch track listing
No.	Title	Length
1.	"Vexations"	5:31
2.	"Layered Presence"	3:07
3.	"Works and Days"	4:16
4.	"Elka"	3:47
5.	"Promenade à deux"	4:23
6.	"Axial Seamount"	4:20
7.	"A Title Comes"	3:11
8.	"Rated OG"	1:56
9.	"Oganesson"	3:17
10.	"Night Gang"	5:00
Total length:		38:53

== Personnel ==
Credits adapted from liner notes.

- Dan Bitney – performance
- John Herndon – performance
- Douglas McCombs – performance
- John McEntire – performance, recording, mixing
- Jeff Parker – performance
- Tucker Martine – field recordings (3)
- Skip VonKuske – cello (5)
- Marta Sofia Honer – viola (5)
- Dave Cooley – mastering
- Heather Cantrell – scorpion photography
- Martin McEntire – scorpion sculpture
- øjeRum – collage image
- Jeremiah Chiu – layout, design

== Charts ==
Chart performance for Touch
Chart (2025)	Peak position
Scottish Albums (Official Charts)	66
UK Album Downloads (Official Charts)	11
UK Independent Albums (Official Charts)	13
