= The Aluminum Group =

- Origin: Chicago, Illinois, United States
- Genre: Pop
- Years active: 1989–present
- Labels: Minty Fresh; Hefty; Wishing Tree; P-Vine
- Members: John Navin; Frank Navin
- Past members: John Ridenour; Liz Conant; Eddie Carlson; John Blaha

The Aluminum Group is an American pop band from Chicago, Illinois centered on brothers John and Frank Navin. The band has released eight albums, on various record labels including Minty Fresh, Hefty, Wishing Tree, and P-Vine.

== History ==
The Navin brothers grew up in Detroit, moving to Chicago in 1979. In Chicago, they formed their first band in 1982, the hardcore punk band Women In Love. In 1985, they left the band, increasingly becoming interested in softer pop music. They formed a new performance art group together, Bleak House, and in 1989 started working together on what would evolve into The Aluminum Group. The band's name is taken from a line of furniture by Charles and Ray Eames. The early line-up of the band included Eddie Carlson (Poi Dog Pondering) on bass and Liz Conant on keyboards. The band took inspiration from British groups of the early 1980s such as Everything but the Girl, Marine Girls and The Monochrome Set, as well as The Carpenters and Claudine Longet.

The brothers self-released their debut album, Wonder Boy, in 1995, described by Allmusic writer Stewart Mason as "a soft pop gem". Their second album, Plano, was produced by Dave Trumfio, and in the view of Jason Ankeny "resonates with a timeless and heartbreaking beauty". The album featured guitarist John Ridenour and their former Women in Love bandmate, drummer John Blaha, as well as guest appearances from musicians including Sally Timms. The album was released by the Minty Fresh label, who would also release the band's next album. For the band's third album, Pedals on Minty Fresh, they worked with Jim O'Rourke, the album also featuring Timms and Sean O'Hagan. . In 2002, the brothers contributed to the album The Executioners Last Songs, in aid of Artists Against the Death Penalty and the Illinois Coalition Against the Death Penalty. On their fourth album Pelo they worked with producer John Herndon, and introduced more electronic elements to the band's sound.

The band's fifth album, Happyness (2002), was the first in a trilogy, and was described as "postmodernist pop music that sounds simultaneously cutting edge, retro, and utterly timeless". The second in the series, Morehappyness (2003), included contributions from members of Tortoise and The Sea & Cake. The trilogy was completed with Little Happyness (2008).

The brothers and the band are the subject of Patrick McGuinn's documentary film The Pursuit of Happyness.

In April 2022, the band released their first album in 14 years, a self-titled album. According to their Bandcamp profile, as well as recent social media posts, the Navin brothers have returned to Detroit.

== Musical style ==
The band's music has been described as "indie pop", "bliss-pop"/"chamber pop", "lounge tunes with a new wave bent", and "space pop". with comparisons being made with Eric Matthews, Belle & Sebastian, Holiday, The Divine Comedy, The Magnetic Fields, and Stereolab. The Riverfront Times described the band's music as "a potent cocktail of atmospheric electronica, slinky soul and old-school easy-listening". SPIN, reviewing Pedals, identified elements of lounge music, bossa nova, and yé yé.

Both Navin brothers are gay, and this is reflected in the band's lyrical themes.

== Discography ==
=== Albums ===
- Wonder Boy (1995), Aluminum Group - reissued as Wonder Boy Plus (1999), Minty Fresh with bonus tracks
- Plano (1998), Minty Fresh
- Pedals (1999), Minty Fresh
- Pelo (2000), Hefty
- Happyness (2002), Wishing Tree
- Morehappyness (2003), Wishing Tree
- Little Happyness (2008), Minty Fresh/P-Vine
- The Aluminum Group (2022), self-released

Compilations

- Introducing... (2000), Marina
- The Best of Minty Fresh Years, VSC

=== Singles, EPs ===
- Untitled EP (2005), En/Of
- "If You've Got A Lover, You've Got A Life" (2006), Hefty
- "Drag Yourself" (2020)
