= On the Chin =

On the Chin may refer to:

- "On the Chin", a song by Kings of Leon on their 2013 album Mechanical Bull
- "On the Chin", a song by Tortoise on their 2004 album It's All Around You
