= Djed (disambiguation) =

Djed is a symbol in ancient Egyptian religion.

Djed may also refer to:

- Djed, a title for the head of the Bosnian Church
- "Djed", a song by Tortoise from the album Millions Now Living Will Never Die
- Djed Spence, an English footballer at Tottenham Hotspur F.C.
