= Bindu (album) =

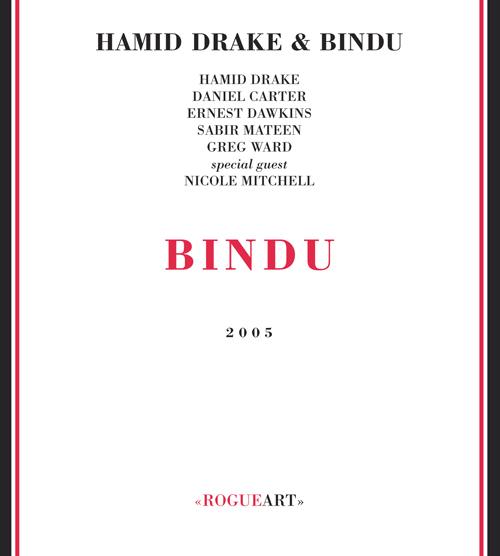

Studio album by Hamid Drake and Bindu
- Released: 2005
- Recorded: March 1–2, 2005
- Studio: Soma Electronic Music Studios, Chicago, Illinois
- Genre: Free jazz
- Length: 1:13:31
- Label: Rogueart; ROG-0001
- Producer: Michel Dorbon

Hamid Drake and Bindu chronology
Bindu (2005)	Blissful (2008)

Bindu is the debut album by drummer Hamid Drake and his group Bindu. It was recorded on March 1 and 2, 2005, at Soma Electronic Music Studios in Chicago, Illinois, and was issued on CD later that year by Rogueart as the label's inaugural release. On the album, Drake is joined by saxophonists and clarinetists Daniel Carter, Ernest Dawkins, Sabir Mateen, and Greg Ward, as well as flutist and special guest Nicole Mitchell.

== Reception ==
Professional ratings
Review scores
Source	Rating
AllMusic	4/5 stars

In a review for AllMusic, Alain Drouot wrote: "Propelled and supported by the percussionist, the four saxophonists and clarinetists offer gorgeous comping and vamping, harrowing counterpoints, and enthralling dialogues; their interwoven voices are definitely a highlight... This most auspicious attempt at leading his own project should encourage Drake to move further in that direction."

Kurt Gottschalk of All About Jazz singled out "Remembering Rituals," a flute and percussion duet, for praise, describing Mitchell as "the rare flautist inventive enough to carry such an extended percussion piece." AAJ's Ollie Bivens called the album "an enjoyable listen," but suggested that it "is best enjoyed in portions—the parts being better than the whole."

Paris Transatlantic's Nate Dorward stated: "The keynote of Bindu... is the relation between drums and the human voice, whether raised in praise, prayer or elegy... It's music more about sound, mood and collaborative jamming than about development... the results are varied and alluring... Drake's rolling, handwoven grooves are a tonic in this age of jazz drummers hung up on herkyjerky hyperactivity."

Writing for JazzWord, Ken Waxman commented: "Moving among his extended percussion kit... Drake manipulates and maneuvers them to confirm why his rhythmic aptitude is in demand literally throughout the world." Regarding the two-part "Bindu #1 for Ed Blackwell," he remarked: "both contain the sort of funky, pared-to-the-bone riffing that wouldn't have been unfamiliar to Count Basie's or any other Southwestern territory band reed section. Off-kilter foot-tappers, they highlight irregular vibrated split tones and glottal punctuates from one altoist, double tongued, overblown honks from one of the tenorists and intense ornamentation from a clarinetist as Drake supplies triple-metered Africanized beats."

In an article for Perfect Sound Forever, Mike Wood noted that, on the album, Drake "is much more meditative and hermetic as some of his other work." He wrote: "Drawing on his study of Sufism and Buddhism more explicitly than in other contexts, Drake extends his past work, claiming it in surprising ways, as if showing what he has learned and what he aims to now teach."

== Track listing ==
1. "Remembering Rituals" (Hamid Drake, Nicole Mitchell) – 13:46
2. "Bindu #2 for Baba Fred Anderson" (Hamid Drake) – 10:53
3. "A Prayer for the Bardo, for Baba Mechack Silas" (Daniel Carter, Ernest Dawkins, Greg Ward, Hamid Drake, Sabir Mateen) – 8:37
4. "Meeting and Parting" (Daniel Carter, Ernest Dawkins, Greg Ward, Hamid Drake, Sabir Mateen) – 11:09
5. "Born Upon a Lotus" (Hamid Drake) – 3:04
6. "Bindu #1 for Ed Blackwell" (Hamid Drake) – 6:27
7. "Bindu #1 for Ed Blackwell, From Bindu to Ojas" (Hamid Drake) – 6:08
8. "Do Khyentse's Journey, 139 Years and More" (Hamid Drake) – 13:27

== Personnel ==
- Hamid Drake – drums, frame drum, tabla, voice
- Nicole Mitchell – flute
- Daniel Carter – tenor saxophone, alto saxophone, clarinet
- Ernest Dawkins – tenor saxophone, alto saxophone, percussion
- Sabir Mateen – tenor saxophone, alto saxophone, alto clarinet, bass clarinet, voice
- Greg Ward – alto saxophone, clarinet
