= Slight Freedom =

Studio album by Jeff Parker
- Released: December 9, 2016
- Recorded: 2013–2014
- Genre: Jazz
- Length: 37:20
- Label: Eremite
- Producers: Jeff Parker; Michael Ehlers

Jeff Parker chronology
The New Breed (2016)	Slight Freedom (2016)	Suite for Max Brown (2020)

Slight Freedom is a solo studio album by American guitarist Jeff Parker. It was released on December 9, 2016, through Eremite Records.

== Background ==
Jeff Parker is a guitarist of the band Tortoise. Slight Freedom is his second album of 2016, following The New Breed. It is his first solo guitar record. On the album, Parker plays electric guitar, effects, and samplers. The album was recorded with no overdubs, using a Boomerang Phrase Sampler to layer sounds in real time. It consists of four tracks: "Slight Freedom"; an instrumental cover of Frank Ocean's "Super Rich Kids"; a rendition of "Mainz", written by Chad Taylor; and an instrumental version of the standard "Lush Life", written by Billy Strayhorn. The album clocks in at 37 minutes. The album's cover art features a black-and-white photograph of Parker performing.

The album was released on December 9, 2016, through Eremite Records.

== Critical reception ==
Professional ratings
Review scores
Source	Rating
DownBeat	4.5/5 stars
Pitchfork	8.0/10
PopMatters	9/10

Bill Meyer of DownBeat compared the album to The New Breed, writing, "Slight Freedom presents the more adventurous side of Parker's playing, but it is rooted in the same African-American pop lineage." John Garratt of PopMatters commented that "Even the spaciest Tortoise tracks are insufficient in preparing for what awaits you on Slight Freedom." Philip Sherburne of Pitchfork stated, "It's not jazz, it's not ambient, it's not noise; it's something more idiosyncratic and more personal, something only Parker could have come up with." Lars Gotrich of NPR Music called the album "One of 2016's most unassuming revelations in guitar music."

=== Accolades ===
Year-end lists for Slight Freedom
Publication	List	Rank	Ref.
Magnet	Best of 2016: Jazz/Improv	9	
NPR Music	The Top 10 Solo Guitar Records of 2016	—	

== Track listing ==
Slight Freedom track listing
No.	Title	Writer(s)	Length
1.	"Slight Freedom"	Jeff Parker	11:34
2.	"Super Rich Kids"	Frank Ocean	5:08
3.	"Mainz"	Chad Taylor	12:19
4.	"Lush Life"	Billy Strayhorn	8:18
Total length:			37:20

== Personnel ==
Credits adapted from liner notes.

- Jeff Parker – electric guitar, effects, sampler, production
- Griffin Alan Rodriguez – recording (1, 4)
- Emmett Kelly – recording (2, 3)
- Michael Ehlers – recording (2, 3), production
- Helge Sten – mastering
- Mikel Patrick Avery – photography
- Alan Sherry – silkscreening
