= Standards (Tortoise album) =

Studio album by Tortoise
- Released: February 20, 2001
- Recorded: 2000
- Studio: Soma, Chicago
- Genre: Post-rock; experimental rock; jazz fusion
- Length: 44:18
- Label: Thrill Jockey
- Producer: John McEntire

Tortoise chronology
In the Fishtank 5 (1999)	Standards (2001)	It's All Around You (2004)

Standards is the fourth studio album by American post-rock band Tortoise. It was released on Thrill Jockey in 2001.

== Production ==
Tortoise's previous albums had been recorded in the original, smaller Soma studio, which was eventually moved to another location. Soma's new location boasted a larger live room which had enough space for all members of the band to play together and thus, according to Jeff Parker, allowed them to "experiment with the acoustics of the space" more than on previous releases. Tortoise initially recorded demos of the songs, then played a handful of shows in Chicago, Madison, Wisconsin, Milwaukee, and Champaign, Illinois in order to "come up with new ideas from playing the songs live every night, and to give it a little more energy." The album was then recorded onto tape and edited on the studio computer "if needed."

The album was produced using less of the studio manipulation that had been employed on previous records.

According to John McEntire, many of the songs, such as "Eden 2" and "Eden 1", had their start in the sessions for their previous album, TNT. "Firefly" segues from a studio recording of the track into a version recorded during a band practice.

== Critical reception ==
Professional ratings
Aggregate scores
Source	Rating
Metacritic	78/100
Review scores
Source	Rating
AllMusic	4/5 stars
Alternative Press	8/10
The Encyclopedia of Popular Music	3/5 stars
Entertainment Weekly	B+
NME	3.5/5 stars
Pitchfork	9.2/10
Q	4/5 stars
Rolling Stone	3.5/5 stars
Spin	7/10
URB	4/5 stars

The A.V. Club wrote that "the band is poised between capturing a momentary, malleable inspiration and shaping that moment into some timeless anthem, and as always, it chooses to dither and delay, settling for a sometimes pleasant, sometimes maddening, almost always stimulating exploration of atmospherics." Entertainment Weekly called the album "mood music for post-post-moderns, both forward- and backward-looking." Spin deemed it "a cohesion of styles and impulses so tight we might call it originality." The New Zealand Herald called Standards "a neatly intriguing, mish-mash of instrumental rock shot through with lopsided grooves, dreamy drones, not-quite-jazz percussion and vibes, and knob-twiddling electronica rubbing up against a junk-store of old instruments - all of which somehow emerges as an accessible, tuneful, structured affair."

== Track listing ==
All tracks are written by Tortoise.

No.	Title	Length
1.	"Seneca"	6:20
2.	"Eros"	4:26
3.	"Benway"	4:46
4.	"Firefly"	3:56
5.	"Six Pack"	3:11
6.	"Eden 2"	2:08
7.	"Monica"	6:30
8.	"Blackjack"	4:07
9.	"Eden 1"	2:36
10.	"Speakeasy"	6:18
Total length:		44:18

Japanese edition bonus tracks
No.	Title	Length
11.	"Blackbird"	5:04
12.	"Blue Station"	5:37
Total length:		54:59

== Personnel ==
Sourced from Bandcamp.

Tortoise

- Jeff Parker - guitar, bass
- Dan Bitney - bass, guitar, percussion, vibes, marimba, keyboards, baritone saxophone
- Douglas McCombs - bass, bass 6, guitar, lap steel
- John Herndon - drums, vibes, keyboards, sequencing
- John McEntire - drums, modular synthesizer, ring modulator guitar, electric harpsichord, keyboards

== Charts ==
Chart	Peak position
UK Albums (OCC)	95
US Billboard 200	200
US Independent Albums (Billboard)	10
