= Blissful =

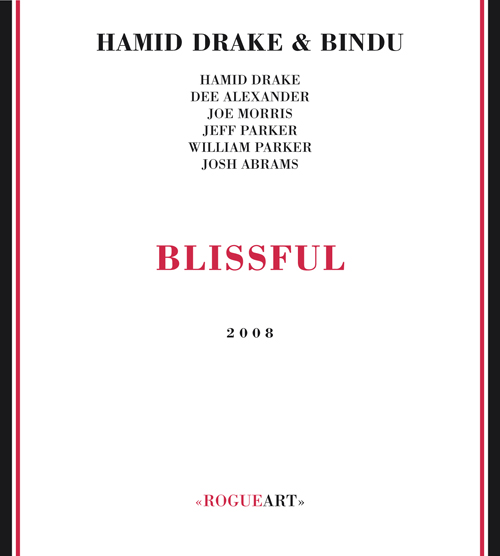

Studio album by Hamid Drake and Bindu
- Released: 2008
- Recorded: July 12–13, 2007
- Studio: Soma Electronic Music Studios, Chicago, Illinois
- Genre: Free jazz
- Label: Rogueart; ROG-0011
- Producer: Michel Dorbon

Hamid Drake and Bindu chronology
Bindu (2005)	Blissful (2008)	Reggaeology (2010)

Blissful is the second album by drummer Hamid Drake and his group Bindu. It was recorded on July 12 and 13, 2007, at Soma Electronic Music Studios in Chicago, Illinois, and was issued on CD in 2008 by Rogueart. On the album, Drake is joined by vocalist Dee Alexander, guitarists Joe Morris and Jeff Parker, and double bassists Josh Abrams and William Parker. Lyrics were written by the 18th-century poet Ramprasad Sen, and were excerpted from Mother of the Universe: Visions of the Goddess and Tantric Hymns of Enlightenment by Lex Hixon.

== Reception ==
Professional ratings
Review scores
Source	Rating
All About Jazz	4.5/5 stars
All About Jazz	3.5/5 stars
The Free Jazz Collective	3/5 stars

In a review for All About Jazz, Lyn Horton wrote: "In every song, long or short, an intricately diverse instrumentation conveys a sacred message of Kali, the Hindu Mother goddess... Drake's miraculous infallibility as percussionist and drummer can never dissolve; he blazes his path into the bandleader position with no less acuity."

Ed Hazell of Point of Departure stated: "The music is of a piece with the spiritual vision... This album is like one of Ellington's Sacred Concerts, a very personal work that moves from a particular religious basis to a universal message. You don't have to be a believer to get it."

The Free Jazz Collective's Stef Gijssels noted that the album finds the players "completely merging jazz with world music," and described the seven tracks as "full of energy, rhythmic complexities, while still being unbelievably pure and authentic." However, he called the lyrics "awful" due to the fact that "Ramprasad's poetry is not only not very poetic, it's also not very lyrical, with lots of abstract words and unequal rhythm."

== Track listing ==
1. "My Blissful Mother" (Hamid Drake) – 16:10
2. "Playful Dance at Soma" (Hamid Drake, Joe Morris, Jeff Parker, William Parker, Josh Abrams) – 12:20
3. "Visions of Ma" (Dee Alexander, Hamid Drake) – 2:33
4. "Supreme Lady Victorious in Battle" (Hamid Drake) – 11:45
5. "Only Longing of My Soul" (Hamid Drake) – 6:52
6. "There is Nothing Left But You" (Dee Alexander, William Parker, Hamid Drake) – 14:07
7. "The Beautiful Names" (Hamid Drake) – 4:36

== Personnel ==
- Hamid Drake – drums, frame drum, tabla, bata, vocals
- Dee Alexander – vocals
- Joe Morris – guitar, banjo
- Jeff Parker – guitar
- Josh Abrams – double bass, guimbri
- William Parker – double bass, guimbri, shenai, doson ngoni
