= Pullman (band) =

American acoustic rock supergroup

- Origin: Chicago, United States
- Genres: Acoustic rock, Folk, Alternative folk
- Years active: 1997–2002
- Labels: Thrill Jockey, Tokuma Japan Communications
- Members: Chris Brokaw, Ken Brown, Curtis Harvey, Doug McCombs, Tim Barnes

Pullman is an American, studio-only, folk and predominantly acoustic rock supergroup, formed in Chicago by Ken Brown, Curtis Harvey, Chris Brokaw, and Doug McCombs in the late 1990s.

== History ==
Beginning as a collaboration between members of several notable 1990s rock bands, Pullman was formed in mid- to late 1997. The project stemmed from conversations between Ken Brown and Curtis Harvey during the recording sessions for Loftus' homonymous debut album and Rex's 1996 sophomore album C. Ken Brown, ex-member of Tortoise and Gastr Del Sol, and Curtis Harvey, from Rex and The Curtis Harvey Band, were joined by Codeine drummer and Come guitarist Chris Brokaw and Eleventh Dream Day bassist Doug McCombs. The project is an amalgam between band and collective, a vessel -as its name indicates- for its members to release acoustic music that did not fit their other musical ventures, as evidenced by the fact that individual members had compositions suitable for Pullman dating back to 1993. In addition to this, the members of Pullman have also collaborated on certain songs, composing them as a band.

For the recording of their second album, Viewfinder, the band was joined by drummer Tim Barnes, who has performed and worked by such acts such as The Tower Recordings, Jim O’Rourke, Silver Jews, and Nagisa Ni Te. Both albums, as Andy Kellman -writing in Allmusic- states, "were conceived in the spirit of the group's favorite acoustic guitarists, including Nick Drake, Leo Kottke, John Fahey, Ry Cooder, and Richard Thompson."

Due to the band members' busy schedule and the fact that they resided in number of different cities -Chicago, New York City, Boston-, Pullman remained a studio-only project, leading to particularly short promotional tours which resulted in the band's semi-obscure status, best encapsulated in the epithetic manner in which Hot Press refers to the band: "the little-known but excellent Pullman"

== Influences ==
Pullman's influences have been both acknowledged by the band and noticed by the press, as evinced in Tim Ross' review of Turnstyles & Junkpiles in Spin magazine, in which he declares that "[t]he quartet's plaintive plucking echoes the pastoral finger-picking of John Fahey and Leo Kottke, but Pullman's pensively paced compositions allow each note to glisten in tranquil isolation." Franklin Bruno, in his review of the band's debut album in CMJ New Music Monthly, also detects these influences, yet -like Ross- Bruno notices the band's singular take on the form: "Pullman deals in neither [Jim] O'Rourke's layered orchestration nor [John] Fahey's edginess, the live-to-tape recording [instead] nicely capturing the largely subdued playing." The Chicago Reader, on the other hand, places "Pullman [musically] somewhere near Town and Country or early Gastr del Sol (which included Brown) in the vast interbred Chicago post-rock zoo."

== Critical reception ==
Critical reception of the band's work has oscillated from the dismissive to the unambiguously praiseful, with the Chicago Tribune declaring Turnstyles & Junkpiles "a disappointing bore", whilst The Wire has referred to the same album as "their excellent debut." The New Musical Express's review of Pullman's first album stresses the uniqueness of the band's approach to the genre: "Pullman refuse to allow the comfortable and reflective drift off into reverie that would normally accompany such a scaled-down recording." Giant Robot magazine called Viewfinder "a great album combining some of the best in music", going on to list the band's members, detailing their respective pedigrees, as did Jean-Baptiste Dupin writing for Les Inrockuptibles, describing Pullman "[a]s a land of suburbs, a small garden on the outskirts humbly handset by eight green hands".

== Members ==
- Chris Brokaw
- Ken Brown (a.k.a. Bundy K. Brown)
- Curtis Harvey
- Doug McCombs
- Tim Barnes

and collaborator

- David Pajo

== Discography ==
=== Albums ===
- Turnstyles & Junkpiles (Thrill Jockey, 1998)
- Viewfinder (Thrill Jockey, 2001)
- III (Western Vinyl, 2026)

=== Contributions to Compilations ===
- "Karissa"* on CHICAGO 2018... It's Gonna Change (Clearspot, 2000)
- "Three in the Morning"* Chicago Underground Quartet cover on Plum (Thrill Jockey, 2007) Limited edition box-set comprising ten 7" double A-side singles

(* indicates track unavailable on any Pullman album)
