= Dizzy Spells (album) =

Studio album by The Ex
- Released: April 24, 2001
- Recorded: November 28–December 4, 2000
- Studio: Black Box Studio, Noyant-la-Gravoyère
- Genre: Post-punk; noise rock; art punk; experimental rock
- Length: 59:22
- Label: Touch and Go Records
- Producer: Steve Albini

The Ex chronology
In the Fishtank 5 (1998)	Dizzy Spells (2001)	Een Rondje Holland (2001)

Dizzy Spells is an album by Dutch post-punk band The Ex. It is the band's 11th studio album and 18th overall, and was produced by Steve Albini who had also produced its predecessor. Dizzy Spells was also The Ex's final studio album to feature bass guitarist Luc who would end up leaving the band after being a member for 20 years.

== Content ==
Pitchfork's Spencer Owen characterized the music as "art punk" writing that their "[a]ngular guitars, [...] oddly clattering beats, and [...] six-minute songs [...] seem to borrow more from Wire and the Talking Heads than the Ramones and the Stooges." Comparisons to Wire were also made by Todd Kristel of Allmusic, who wrote that the album "should appeal to fans of this Dutch band's previous work, as well as newcomers who enjoy Fugazi, Gang of Four, or some of the projects by this album's producer, Steve Albini." Douglas Wolk called the album a "twin to 1998's Starters Alternators" and highlighted "guitarists Terrie and Andy's dueling shredding-sheet-metal atonalities and Gordian-knot rhythms." Franklin Bruno of LA Weekly wrote that the album "doesn't owe a hell of a lot to rock & roll as we know it, though Gang of Four, Fugazi and non-hippie Sonic Youth are all in the mix."

According to Wolk, the lyrics are "either punning geopolitical rants" or "based on texts by obscure poets". Owen characterized the lyrics as "intellectually abstract (or abstractly intellectual?)", pointing out that their political stance isn't as explicit as it used to be in their earlier material. Bruno noted that G.W. Sok's "confused humility ("The chair needs paint/And money's tight") rings truer than his agitprop finger-pointing ("Mickey, Walt and Donald . . . wanna swallow all your souls")."

== Release ==
The album was released through the band's own label in the Benelux region in 2001 on CD. It was released through Touch and Go records in the US and Vicious Circle Records in France the same year.

== Reception ==
Professional ratings
Aggregate scores
Source	Rating
Metacritic	82/100
Review scores
Source	Rating
Allmusic	4/5 stars
Alternative Press	4/5 stars
Pitchfork	(8.5/10)
PopMatters	8/10 stars
Tom Hull	A−

The album received very positive reviews, with a Metacritic score of 82 based on 6 reviews, indicating "[u]niversal acclaim". Wolk praised the album for its grimness and density whilst Owen called the album "truly exciting music, which is especially commendable when you consider they've been at it for so long. And the excitement is sustained so consistently over the hour-long running time that you'll almost begin to wish the six-minute songs were even longer." "Many years of experience have enabled the members of the Ex to perfect their particular brand of agitprop;" writes Kristel, "even if you don't always agree with their anger, you may still enjoy the musical conviction with which they express it." Bruno praised "Steve Albini's lucid, live-oriented anti-production, revealing an idiosyncratic funkiness previous recordings only hinted at." "It's still hard to believe that a punk band formed more than 20 years ago are capable of releasing a new album that's both vital and worthy of the promise of their early material" wrote Alternative Press, "With Dizzy Spells, the quintet may have topped it all."

== Track listing ==
All tracks by The Ex except where noted

1. "Town of Stone" - 5:12
2. "Nobodies' Dream" (Eduardo Galeano) - 4:00
3. "Walt's Dizzyland" - 4:22
4. "Time Flies" - 4:20
5. "Oskar Beck" - 5:43
6. "Burnsome" - 5:10
7. "The Chair Needs Paint" (Drs. P) - 5:06
8. "Fistful of Feed" - 4:21
9. "Haydays" (Lucebert) - 4:38
10. "River" - 5:45
11. "Karaoke Blackout" - 5:06
12. "Little Atlas Heavyweight" - 5:39

== Personnel ==
- Katrin - drums, vocals
- Terrie - guitar
- Andy - guitar
- Luc - bass
- G.W. Sok - vocals
