= Anna Butterss =

- Butterss at Moldejazz in 2026

Background information
- Born: Adelaide, Australia
- Origin: Los Angeles, California, U.S.
- Occupations: Bassist; composer
- Instruments: Double bass; bass guitar
- Years active: 2010s–present
- Labels: Colorfield; International Anthem; Northern Spy
- Member of: SML

Anna Butterss is an Australian bassist and composer. They are a member of the band SML. They have released two solo albums: Activities (2022) and Mighty Vertebrate (2024).

== Early life ==
Anna Butterss was born in Adelaide, Australia. As a child, they played flute for seven years. While attending Marryatville High School, they switched to double bass. After graduating from the University of Adelaide, they moved to the United States in 2012. In 2014, they moved to Los Angeles, California.

== Career ==
In 2022, Butterss released their debut solo album, Activities, through Colorfield Records.

In 2024, Butterss released their second solo album, Mighty Vertebrate, through International Anthem Recording Company. It received universal acclaim from critics.

Butterss is a member of SML, along with Jeremiah Chiu, Josh Johnson, Booker Stardrum, and Gregory Uhlmann. The band released Small Medium Large (2024), How You Been (2025), and Spontaneous Music Live (2026).

== Discography ==
=== Solo albums ===
- Activities (Colorfield, 2022)
- Mighty Vertebrate (International Anthem, 2024)

=== Collaborative albums ===
- Beginningless (with John Raymond and Ben Lumsdaine; Northern Spy, 2026)

=== SML albums ===
- Small Medium Large (International Anthem, 2024)
- How You Been (International Anthem, 2025)
- Spontaneous Music Live (International Anthem, 2026)

=== Contributions ===
- Boygenius – Boygenius (Matador, 2018)
- Makaya McCraven – Universal Beings (International Anthem, 2018)
- Better Oblivion Community Center – Better Oblivion Community Center (Dead Oceans, 2019)
- Phoebe Bridgers – Punisher (Dead Oceans, 2020)
- Aimee Mann – Queens of the Summer Hotel (SuperEgo, 2021)
- Ben Harper – Bloodline Maintenance (Chrysalis, 2022)
- Jeff Parker – Mondays at the Enfield Tennis Academy (Eremite/Aguirre, 2022)
- Boygenius – The Record (Interscope, 2023)
- Kathleen Edwards – Billionaire (Dualtone, 2025)
- Neko Case – Neon Grey Midnight Green (Anti-, 2025)
- Flea – Honora (Nonesuch, 2026)
- Allison Russell – In the Hour of Chaos (Black Wonder, 2026)
- Blondshell – Violins (Partisan, 2026)
