= Reggaeology =

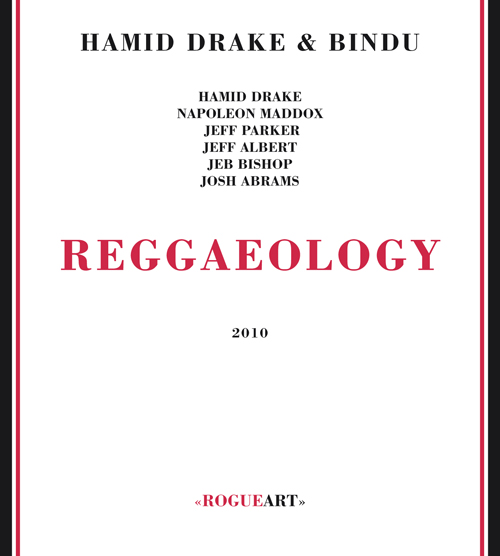

Studio album by Hamid Drake and Bindu
- Released: 2010
- Recorded: May 6–8, 2009; July 28, 2009
- Studio: Soma Electronic Music Studios, Chicago, Illinois; Sape Shoppe Studio, Chicago, Illinois
- Genre: Jazz, reggae
- Length: 1:08:24
- Label: Rogueart; ROG-0021
- Producer: Michel Dorbon

Hamid Drake and Bindu chronology
Blissful (2008)	Reggaeology (2010)

Reggaeology is the third album by American drummer Hamid Drake and his group Bindu. Tracks 1 through 6 were recorded during May 6–8, 2009, at Soma Electronic Music Studios in Chicago, Illinois, while the remaining track was recorded on July 28, 2009, at Sape Shoppe Studio in Chicago. The recording, which blends jazz and reggae, was released on CD in 2010 by Rogueart. On the album, Drake is joined by vocalist Napoléon Maddox, who also provided most of the lyrics, trombonists Jeff Albert and Jeb Bishop, guitarist Jeff Parker, and double bassist Josh Abrams.

== Reception ==
Professional ratings
Review scores
Source	Rating
All About Jazz	4/5 stars
All About Jazz	3.5/5 stars
The Free Jazz Collective	4/5 stars

In a review for All About Jazz, John Sharpe described the music as "a joyous ride," and wrote: "given Drake's extensive reggae back story, it's no surprise that the riddims carry conviction."

Ed Hazell of Point of Departure commented: "The main interest lies not it how well they play reggae... but how they transform elements of reggae into something new... The common point between jazz and reggae that Drake preserves is the ecstasy of rhythm. He understands the ability of a strongly stated beat to make us feel free, irrationally happy, and closer to something greater than ourselves."

The Chicago Reader's Peter Margasak noted that, before becoming a widely recorded free-jazz drummer, Drake "was one of the most talented and in-demand reggae drummers in Chicago," and stated that the album "pushes reggae-jazz experiments a la guitarist Ernest Ranglin into uncharted, freedom-seeking territory."

The Free Jazz Collective's Stef Gijssels remarked: "Sure, this is not jazz. But its exhilarating rhythms, the powerful rhythm and horn section, and Drake's unparalleled drumming make this album a real joy. Not everything works, but the drummer has created something quite unique and special."

== Track listing ==
1. "Kali's Children No Cry" (Hamid Drake) – 19:26
2. "Hymn of Solidarity" (Hamid Drake, Napoléon Maddox, Jeff Parker, Jeff Albert, Jeb Bishop, Josh Abrams) – 7:28
3. "Kali Dub" (Hamid Drake, Napoléon Maddox, Jeff Parker, Jeff Albert, Jeb Bishop, Josh Abrams) – 7:15
4. "The Taste of Radha's Love" (Hamid Drake, Napoléon Maddox, Jeff Parker, Jeff Albert, Jeb Bishop, Josh Abrams) – 9:55
5. "Togetherness" (Hamid Drake, Napoléon Maddox, Jeff Parker, Jeff Albert, Jeb Bishop, Josh Abrams) – 7:10
6. "Meeting and Parting" (Hamid Drake) – 13:10
7. "Take Us Home" (Hamid Drake) – 4:03

== Personnel ==
- Hamid Drake – drums, frame drum, tabla, vocals
- Napoléon Maddox – vocals, beatbox
- Jeff Albert – trombone, Hammond organ
- Jeb Bishop – trombone
- Jeff Parker – guitar
- Josh Abrams – double bass, guimbri
