= Jeff Parker (musician) =

American guitarist and composer

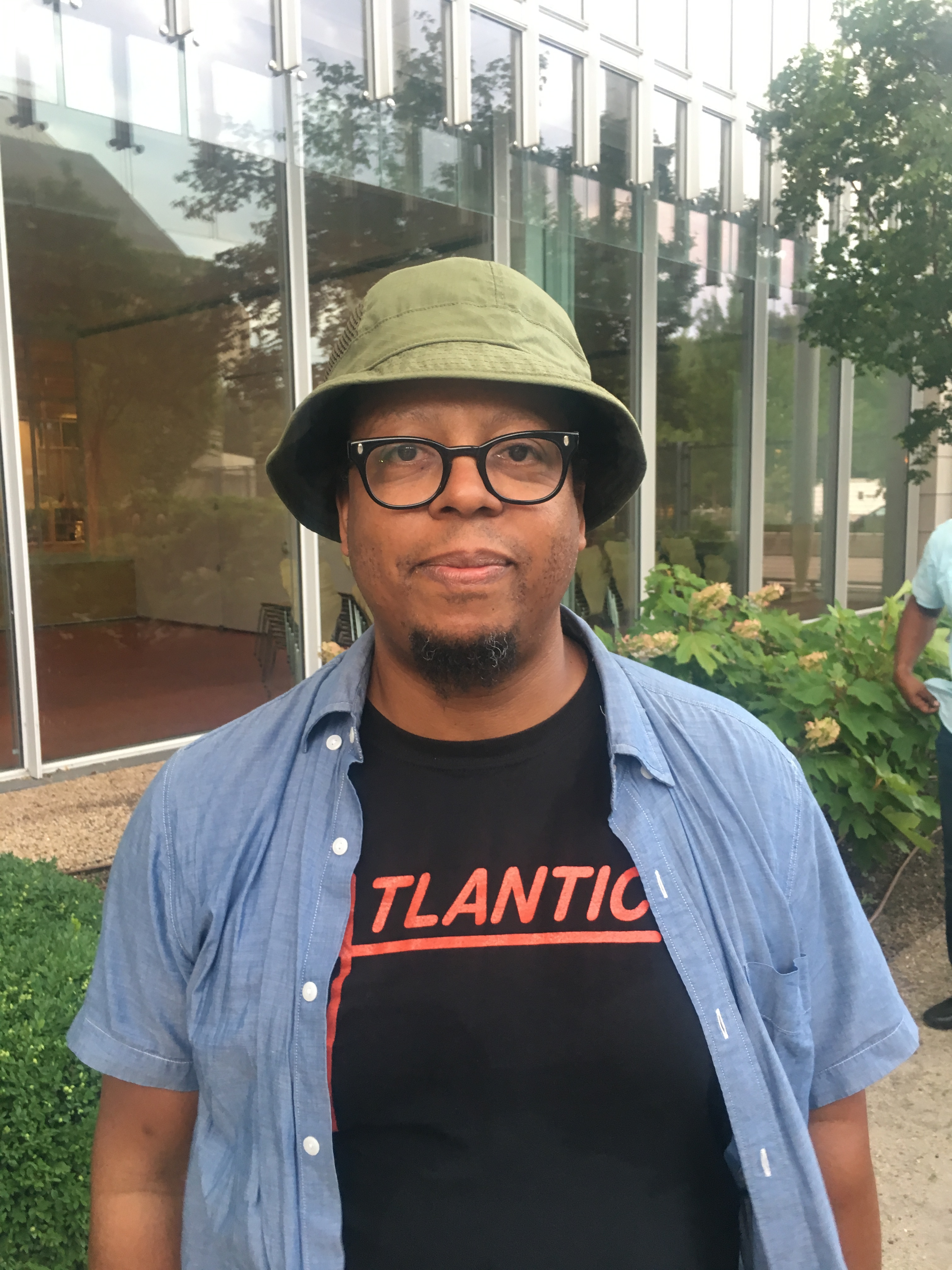

Background information
- Born: April 4, 1967 (age 59); Bridgeport, Connecticut, U.S.
- Genres: Jazz; experimental; post-rock; free jazz
- Occupation: Musician
- Instruments: Guitar; keyboards; bass guitar; drums; drum programming
- Years active: 1991–present
- Labels: Delmark; Atavistic; Thrill Jockey; International Anthem; Eremite; Nonesuch
- Member of: Tortoise; AACM; Isotope 217
- Formerly of: Chicago Underground
- Website: www.jeffparkersounds.com

Jeff Parker (born April 4, 1967) is an American guitarist and composer based in Los Angeles.

== Biography ==
Born in Connecticut and raised in Hampton, Virginia, Parker is best known as an experimental musician, working with jazz, electronic, rock, and improvisational groups. Parker studied at Berklee College of Music and then moved to Chicago in 1991.

Also a multi-instrumentalist, Parker has been a member of the post-rock group Tortoise since 1996. He was a founding member of Isotope 217 and the Chicago Underground Trio in the 1990s and early 2000s. He is also a member of the Association for the Advancement of Creative Musicians (AACM).

He has worked with George Lewis, Ernest Dawkins, Brian Blade, Joshua Redman, Fred Anderson, Meshell Ndegeocello, Joey DeFrancesco, Smog (aka Bill Callahan), Carmen Lundy, Jason Moran, and Flea.

A prolific sideman, he has also released multiple albums as a solo artist and band leader: Like-Coping (2003), The Relatives (2005), The New Breed (2016), Slight Freedom (2016), Suite for Max Brown (2020), Forfolks (2021), Mondays at the Enfield Tennis Academy (2022), The Way Out of Easy (2024), and Happy Today (2026).

== Discography ==
=== As leader or co-leader ===
- Vega (with Bernard Santacruz and Michael Zerang; Marge, 2002)
- Like-Coping (Delmark, 2003)
- Out Trios, Vol. 2 (with Michael Zerang and Kevin Drumm; Atavistic, 2003)
- Song Songs Song (with Scott Fields; Delmark, 2004)
- The Relatives (Thrill Jockey, 2005)
- Bright Light in Winter (with Chris Lopes and Chad Taylor; Delmark, 2012)
- The New Breed (International Anthem, 2016)
- Slight Freedom (Eremite, 2016)
- Diagonal Filter (with Jeb Bishop, Pandelis Karayorgis, Nate McBride, and Luther Gray; Not Two, 2018)
- Suite for Max Brown (International Anthem/Nonesuch, 2020)
- Some Jellyfish Live Forever (with Rob Mazurek; RogueArt, 2021)
- Forfolks (International Anthem/Nonesuch, 2021)
- Eastside Romp (with Eric Revis and Nasheet Waits; RogueArt, 2022)
- Mondays at the Enfield Tennis Academy (Eremite/Aguirre, 2022)
- The Way Out of Easy (International Anthem, 2024)
- Happy Today (International Anthem/Nonesuch, 2026)

=== With Tortoise ===
- TNT (Thrill Jockey, 1998)
- In the Fishtank (In the Fishtank, 1999)
- Standards (Thrill Jockey, 2001)
- It's All Around You (Thrill Jockey, 2004)
- The Brave and the Bold (Overcoat, 2006)
- Beacons of Ancestorship (Thrill Jockey, 2009)
- The Catastrophist (Thrill Jockey, 2016)
- Touch (International Anthem, 2025)

=== With Isotope 217 ===
- The Unstable Molecule (Thrill Jockey, 1997)
- Commander Mindfuck/Designer EP (Aesthetics, 1999)
- Utonian_Automatic (Thrill Jockey, 1999)
- Who Stole the I Walkman? (Thrill Jockey, 2000)

=== With Rob Mazurek ===
- Playground (Delmark, 1998)
- Bill Dixon with Exploding Star Orchestra (Thrill Jockey, 2008)

=== With Tricolor ===
- Mirth + Feckless (Atavistic, 1999)
- Nonparticipant + Milk (Atavistic, 2001)

=== With Chicago Underground ===
- Possible Cube (Delmark, 1999)
- Flamethrower (Delmark, 2000)

=== With Chicago Underground Quartet ===
- Chicago Underground Quartet (Thrill Jockey, 2001)
- Good Days (Astral Spirits, 2020)

=== With Joshua Abrams ===
- Cipher (Delmark, 2003)
- Represencing (Eremite, 2012)
- Magnetoception (Eremite, 2015)
- Cloud Script (with Cloud Script; Rogueart, 2020)

=== With Hamid Drake and Bindu ===
- Blissful (RogueArt, 2008)
- Reggaeology (RogueArt, 2010)

=== With Matana Roberts ===
- The Chicago Project (Central Control, 2008)

=== With Makaya McCraven ===
- In the Moment (International Anthem, 2015)
- Universal Beings (International Anthem, 2018)
- Deciphering the Message (Blue Note, 2021)
- In These Times (International Anthem, 2022)

=== With Daniel Villarreal ===
- Panamá 77 (International Anthem, 2022)
- Lados B (International Anthem, 2023)

=== With Flea ===
- Honora (Nonesuch, 2026)

=== With Gabrielle Cavassa ===
- Diavola (Blue Note, 2026)

== Bibliography ==
- Fabian Holt, 2007. Jeff Parker and the Chicago Jazz Scene. In: Genre in Popular Music. Chicago and London: University of Chicago Press, ISBN 978-0-226-35039-4
