= Rhythms, Resolutions & Clusters =

Remix album by Tortoise
- Released: 1995
- Genre: Post-rock; instrumental rock
- Length: 32:53
- Label: Thrill Jockey

Tortoise chronology
Tortoise (1994)	Rhythms, Resolutions & Clusters (1995)	Millions Now Living Will Never Die (1996)

Professional ratings
Review scores
Source	Rating
Allmusic	link

Rhythms, Resolutions & Clusters is a remix album by the Chicago-based band Tortoise. It consists entirely of remixed (and retitled) versions of songs from their first album. Some of the remixes were performed by band members, others by friends of the band including Steve Albini, Rick Brown, Jim O'Rourke and Brad Wood.

In 2006, the whole of this album was reissued in A Lazarus Taxon (as the third CD in the box set). The reissue also contains an extra remix by Mike Watt, which was not included in the original release due to timing and technical reasons.

The album was given a limited vinyl release in 2022 for the band's 30th anniversary.

== Track listing ==
No.	Title	Length
1.	"Alcohall" (remix by John McEntire)	4:04
2.	"Your New Rod" (remix by Rick Brown)	4:18
3.	"Cobwebbed" (remix by Casey Rice)	4:39
4.	"The Match Incident" (remix by Steve Albini)	5:31
5.	"Tin Cans (The Puerto Rican Mix)" (remix by Brad Wood)	4:25
6.	"Not Quite East of the Ryan" (remix by Bundy K. Brown)	5:09
7.	"Initial Gesture Protraction" (remix by Jim O'Rourke)	4:47
