= Forfolks =

Studio album by Jeff Parker
- Released: December 10, 2021
- Recorded: June 28, 2021; June 29, 2021
- Studio: Sholo (Altadena, California)
- Length: 40:19
- Labels: International Anthem; Nonesuch
- Producer: Scott McNiece

Jeff Parker chronology
Suite for Max Brown (2020)	Forfolks (2021)	Mondays at the Enfield Tennis Academy (2022)

Forfolks is a solo studio album by American guitarist Jeff Parker. It was released on December 10, 2021, through International Anthem Recording Company and Nonesuch Records. It received universal acclaim from critics.

== Background ==
Jeff Parker is an American guitarist. Forfolks consists of his solo guitar works. It features six original songs, as well as his versions of the standard "My Ideal" and Thelonious Monk's "Ugly Beauty". The album was recorded at Parker's home studio in Altadena, California, over two days in June 2021.

A music video was released for "Suffolk", directed by Cauleen Smith. The album was released on December 10, 2021, through International Anthem Recording Company and Nonesuch Records.

== Critical reception ==
Professional ratings
Aggregate scores
Source	Rating
Metacritic	87/100
Review scores
Source	Rating
AllMusic	4/5 stars
Mojo	5/5 stars
The Observer	4/5 stars
Pitchfork	8.2/10
PopMatters	7/10
Spectrum Culture	80%
Uncut	8/10
Under the Radar	8.5/10

According to the review aggregator Metacritic, Forfolks received "universal acclaim" based on a weighted average score of 87 out of 100 from 7 critic scores.

Mariel Fechik of Under the Radar described the album as "a transfixing solo guitar record that finds Parker turning inward, creating a collection of songs that border on musical meditation." Erin Osmon of Uncut commented that "He situates his intuitive, improvised guitar work among a menagerie of textural loops, working alone and thus fully exposed, his playing a gift of intimacy and warmth in a climate very much in need of such things." Jesper Nøddeskov of PopMatters wrote, "Forfolks is Jeff Parker on his own, but it's a selfless statement." He added, "Here the music, like life, thrives in collaboration, and context is everything."

Grayson Haver Currin of Pitchfork stated, "The games he plays with rhythm and repetition feel like a frontier, a suggestion of new spaces to explore for solo guitarists indebted to minimalism, drone, and electronics." He added, "Hearing a long-consummate instrumentalist well into his 50s grapple so clearly with the future of his own idiom is plenty inspiring; the quiet confidence with which Parker proclaims there is something else to say with just six strings and a few effects feels like a revelation, for himself and the form." Andrew Male of Mojo praised "an ability to create entire new sonic worlds from the tiniest of elements." Thom Jurek of AllMusic commented that "Forfolks is as welcoming as it is musically adventurous."

=== Accolades ===
Year-end lists for Forfolks
Publication	List	Rank	Ref.
Mojo	The 50 Best Albums of 2022	33	
Pitchfork	The 50 Best Albums of 2022	48	
The Quietus	Quietus Albums of the Year 2021	69	
The Vinyl Factory	Our 50 Favourite Albums of 2021	38	

== Track listing ==
All tracks are written by Jeff Parker, except where noted.

Forfolks track listing
No.	Title	Writer(s)	Length
1.	"Off Om"		1:21
2.	"Four Folks"		5:34
3.	"My Ideal"	Richard A. Whiting; Newell Chase; Leo Robin	3:10
4.	"Suffolk"		7:38
5.	"Flour of Fur"		4:08
6.	"Ugly Beauty"	Thelonious Monk	3:24
7.	"Excess Success"		10:53
8.	"La Jetée"		4:11
Total length:			40:19

== Personnel ==
Credits adapted from liner notes.

- Jeff Parker – electric guitar
- Scott McNiece – production, sequencing
- Graeme Gibson – engineering, mixing
- David Allen – mastering
- Jeremiah Chiu – cover design
- Craig Hansen – insert design
- Lee Anne Schmitt – photography
- Matthew Lux – liner notes

== Charts ==
Chart performance for Forfolks
Chart (2021)	Peak position
UK Album Downloads (Official Charts)	72
