= Mondays at the Enfield Tennis Academy =

Live album by Jeff Parker
- Released: October 28, 2022
- Recorded: 2019–2021
- Venue: Enfield Tennis Academy (Los Angeles)
- Genre: Jazz
- Length: 83:47
- Labels: Eremite; Aguirre
- Producers: Jeff Parker; Michael Ehlers

Jeff Parker chronology
Forfolks (2021)	Mondays at the Enfield Tennis Academy (2022)	The Way Out of Easy (2024)

Mondays at the Enfield Tennis Academy is a live album by American guitarist Jeff Parker. It was released on October 28, 2022, through Eremite Records and Aguirre Records. It received universal acclaim from critics.

== Background ==
Mondays at the Enfield Tennis Academy contains performances by guitarist Jeff Parker, saxophonist Josh Johnson, bassist Anna Butterss, and drummer Jay Bellerose. It was recorded at the Enfield Tennis Academy, a Los Angeles cocktail bar whose name is derived from David Foster Wallace's novel Infinite Jest. The album was released on October 28, 2022, through Eremite Records and Aguirre Records.

== Critical reception ==
Professional ratings
Aggregate scores
Source	Rating
Metacritic	85/100
Review scores
Source	Rating
AllMusic	4.5/5 stars
Mojo	4/5 stars
Pitchfork	8.4/10
Uncut	7/10

According to the review aggregator Metacritic, Mondays at the Enfield Tennis Academy received "universal acclaim" based on a weighted average score of 85 out of 100 from 5 critic scores.

John Mulvey of Mojo commented that there is "something magically laid-back about these four longform jams, a certain zoned virtuosity that corresponds with an idea of Californian good vibes." Daniel Felsenthal of Pitchfork stated, "It lays out long-form spiritual jazz, knotty melodies, and effortless solos over a slow-moving foundation as consistent as an 808." He added, "Its metronomic rhythms pacify, but the performers and their idiosyncratic expressions offer ample material to those interested in hearing young luminaries and seasoned vets swap ideas within a group."

Thom Jurek of AllMusic described the album as "deeply intuitive, subtly detailed, endlessly grooving, holistic jazz-trance music that was improvised at an extremely high level." Antonio Poscic of The Quietus wrote, "In contrast to the usual free improvisation idiom and its tendency to meander between abstract figures and skronking freakouts, the four pieces here – each of them around twenty minutes long – are locked into steady, slowly shifting rhythms that give the music a funky, cosy feeling."

=== Accolades ===
Year-end lists for Mondays at the Enfield Tennis Academy
Publication	List	Rank	Ref.
AllMusic	AllMusic Best of 2022	—	
The Wire	Releases of the Year (2022 Rewind)	18	

== Track listing ==
All tracks are written by Jeff Parker, Josh Johnson, Anna Butterss, and Jay Bellerose, except "2019-05-19" by Parker.

Mondays at the Enfield Tennis Academy (disc one) track listing
No.	Title	Length
1.	"2019-07-08 I"	21:46
2.	"2019-07-08 II"	23:37

Mondays at the Enfield Tennis Academy (disc two) track listing
No.	Title	Length
1.	"2019-05-19"	18:00
2.	"2021-04-28"	20:17

== Personnel ==
Credits adapted from liner notes.

- Jeff Parker – electric guitar, pedals, production
- Josh Johnson – alto saxophone, pedals
- Anna Butterss – double bass
- Jay Bellerose – drums, percussion
- Michael Ehlers – production
- Bryce Gonzales – recording
- Joe Lizzi – mastering
- Kevin Gray – lacquer cut
- D. Norsen – art design
- Eremite – art design
- Robbie Jeffers – photography
