= The Brave and the Bold (album) =

Studio album by Tortoise & Bonnie "Prince" Billy
- Released: January 24, 2006
- Recorded: 2003–2004
- Studio: Soma
- Length: 39:44
- Label: Overcoat

Bonnie "Prince" Billy chronology
Superwolf (2005)	The Brave and the Bold (2006)	The Letting Go (2006)

Tortoise chronology
It's All Around You (2004)	The Brave and the Bold (2006)	A Lazarus Taxon (2006)

The Brave and the Bold is a 2006 collaborative studio album by Tortoise and Bonnie "Prince" Billy. It was released on Overcoat Recordings. It consists of interpretations of ten songs originally by a wide range of musicians.

== Critical reception ==
Professional ratings
Aggregate scores
Source	Rating
Metacritic	65/100
Review scores
Source	Rating
AllMusic	3/5 stars
The A.V. Club	B+
The Guardian	4/5 stars
Pitchfork	5.4/10
PopMatters	8/10 stars
Slant Magazine	3/5 stars

At Metacritic, which assigns a weighted average score out of 100 to reviews from mainstream critics, the album received an average score of 65, based on 28 reviews, indicating "generally favorable reviews".

Amanda Petrusich of Pitchfork stated that "The Brave and the Bold is a collection of not-particularly-compelling cover songs, rolled out by two of contemporary indie's most uncompromising and rewarding forces." Michael J. Kramer of PopMatters called it "a melding of the minds, a comic-book collision of musical forces whose mutant powers turn mere simulation into disturbing mimetic magic."

== Track listing ==
No.	Title	Original artist(s)	Length
1.	"Cravo E Canela"	Milton Nascimento	3:09
2.	"Thunder Road"	Bruce Springsteen	6:28
3.	"It's Expected I'm Gone"	Minutemen	3:21
4.	"Daniel"	Elton John	4:59
5.	"Love Is Love"	Lungfish	3:31
6.	"Pancho"	Don Williams	3:13
7.	"That's Pep!"	Devo	2:41
8.	"Some Say (I Got Devil)"	Melanie Safka	3:33
9.	"The Calvary Cross"	Richard Thompson	5:08
10.	"On My Own"	Quix*o*tic	3:41

== Charts ==
Chart	Peak position
Belgian Albums (Ultratop Flanders)	77
US Heatseekers Albums (Billboard)	23
US Independent Albums (Billboard)	31
