= The Catastrophist =

Studio album by Tortoise
- Released: January 22, 2016
- Studio: Soma
- Genre: Post-rock
- Length: 43:35
- Label: Thrill Jockey

Tortoise chronology
Beacons of Ancestorship (2009)	The Catastrophist (2016)	Touch (2025)

Professional ratings
Aggregate scores
Source	Rating
AnyDecentMusic?	6.8/10
Metacritic	73/100
Review scores
Source	Rating
AllMusic	4/5 stars
The A.V. Club	B
Consequence of Sound	B−
Exclaim!	7/10
Pitchfork	6.8/10
PopMatters	7/10
Resident Advisor	3.4/5
Rolling Stone	3.5/5 stars
Slant Magazine	3/5 stars
Tiny Mix Tapes	2.5/5 stars

The Catastrophist is the seventh studio album by American post-rock band Tortoise. It was released on Thrill Jockey in 2016. It features vocal contributions from Todd Rittmann and Georgia Hubley.

== Track listing ==
All tracks are written by Tortoise, except "Rock On" by David Essex and "Yonder Blue" by Tortoise and Georgia Hubley.

No.	Title	Length
1.	"The Catastrophist"	3:52
2.	"Ox Duke"	4:49
3.	"Rock On" (featuring Todd Rittmann on vocals)	3:12
4.	"Gopher Island"	1:13
5.	"Shake Hands with Danger"	4:10
6.	"The Clearing Fills"	4:22
7.	"Gesceap"	7:37
8.	"Hot Coffee"	3:53
9.	"Yonder Blue" (featuring Georgia Hubley on vocals)	3:18
10.	"Tesseract"	3:54
11.	"At Odds with Logic"	3:15
Total length:		43:35

Japanese edition bonus tracks
No.	Title	Length
12.	"The Mystery Won't Reveal Itself (to You)"	4:02
13.	"Yonder Blue (Instrumental)"	3:20
Total length:		50:57

== Charts ==
Chart (2016)	Peak position
US Heatseekers Albums (Billboard)	10
US Independent Albums (Billboard)	24
US Tastemaker Albums (Billboard)	13
US Top Rock Albums (Billboard)	38
Belgian Albums (Ultratop Flanders)	164
