= Missing Dragons =

EP by A Grape Dope
- Released: May 27, 2003
- Genre: Instrumental hip hop, post-rock
- Length: 26:41
- Label: Galaxia
- Producer: John Herndon

A Grape Dope chronology
Immediate Action (2000)	Missing Dragons (2003)

Professional ratings
Review scores
Source	Rating
Brainwashed	favorable
Dusted Magazine	favorable
Exclaim!	favorable
Pitchfork	4.1/10
Splendid Magazine	favorable
XLR8R	favorable

Missing Dragons is an EP by A Grape Dope (born John Herndon). It was released on Galaxia on May 27, 2003.

== Critical reception ==
Andrew Bryant of Pitchfork gave the EP a 4.1 out of 10, calling it an "unappealing release with few redeeming qualities". Meanwhile, Andy Lee of Exclaim! said: "In less than 30 minutes, A Grape Dope demonstrates more innovation than many artists do in their entire lifetimes."

Fritz the Cat of Vice listed it as one of the nine best records of 2003.

== Track listing ==
No.	Title	Length
1.	"Action: Showered Us"	6:06
2.	"When You Crash and Burn"	5:21
3.	"Red Hat Attack" (featuring Doseone)	4:43
4.	"Inaction: Shadowed Us"	2:07
5.	"I'll Spread It"	4:36
6.	"Hellz Bellz"	3:45

== Personnel ==
Credits adapted from liner notes.

- A Grape Dope – music, mixing
- Kathryn Frazier – vocals (2)
- Sally Timms – vocals (2)
- Doseone – vocals (3)
- Human Condition – mixing
- Designer – mixing
- Damon Locks – artwork, design
- Sheila Sachs – design
- Wayne Montana – fishes illustration
