= John Barton Wolgamot =

American poet (1902–1989)

John Barton Wolgamot (May 18, 1902 – April 25, 1989) was an American outsider poet who is primarily remembered for his experimental book-length poem In Sara, Mencken, Christ and Beethoven There Were Men and Women (published 1944).

== Biography ==
Wolgamot was not a professional writer; he ran a movie theater for a living. In Sara was published in a very small run financed by the author. The information normally included in a published book for the era (e.g., mailing address for the publisher, Library of Congress number) was missing. Wolgamot sent two copies of the book to H.L. Mencken, an influential journalist and critic of the early 20th century, evidently hoping for a positive review. Mencken's brief notes scribbled in one of the books dismissed the poem as "balderdash". Both copies of In Sara were donated to the Enoch Pratt Free Library in Baltimore upon Mencken's 1956 death, along with most of his private library.

Wolgamot's work captured the imagination of several young poets and critics when the poem was discovered in a second-hand shop in the 1950s by then-graduate student Keith Waldrop. Waldrop and Robert Ashley tracked down Wolgamot in mid-1973, finding him living in New York City and describing him as "an old-fashioned spiffy dresser" in his 60s. He had written no further works after In Sara, but named Ashley the executor of his estate in gratitude for bringing his work to wider attention. In a 1980 letter to Waldrop, Wolgamot claimed to be working on a new book but no such book was found among his possessions after Wolgamot's death.

== Legacy ==
Wolgamot's status as a cult figure has been enhanced in recent decades by musical compositions by Robert Ashley and American instrumental group Tortoise in which his work, if not celebrated outright, is heavily referenced.
