= The New Breed (Jeff Parker album) =

Studio album by Jeff Parker
- Released: June 24, 2016
- Genre: Jazz
- Length: 36:10
- Label: International Anthem
- Producers: Jeff Parker; Paul Bryan

Jeff Parker chronology
The Relatives (2005)	The New Breed (2016)	Slight Freedom (2016)

Singles from The New Breed
- 1. "Get Dressed" Released: April 4, 2016

The New Breed is a studio album by American guitarist, composer, and record producer Jeff Parker. It was released on June 24, 2016, through International Anthem Recording Company.

== Background ==
Jeff Parker is an American guitarist, composer, and record producer. The New Breed is his first solo work since relocating from Chicago to Los Angeles. It contains performances by Parker, Josh Johnson, Paul Bryan, Jamire Williams, Jay Bellerose, and Parker's daughter, Ruby Parker. The album's title comes from a clothing store owned by his father, Ernie Parker. The album's cover features a photograph of Ernie and his friend standing in front of the store.

The album was released on June 24, 2016, through International Anthem Recording Company. A music video was released for "Cliche".

== Critical reception ==
Professional ratings
Review scores
Source	Rating
AllMusic	3.5/5 stars
Jazzwise	4/5 stars
PopMatters	7/10

Leor Galil of Bandcamp Daily commented that "Parker holds everything together, adjusting his lithe guitar playing to match the mood of each song and infusing The New Breed with tender, hearthside warmth." Paul Simpson of AllMusic stated, "The New Breed is a warm, inviting album of reflection and inspiration that finds Parker easily adapting new techniques to his signature style." Nate Chinen of The New York Times described the album as "a retro-futurist jazz-funk reverie, slithery, smart and cool."

=== Accolades ===
Year-end lists for The New Breed
Publication	List	Rank	Ref.
Bandcamp Daily	The Best Albums of 2016	39	
Chicago Reader	The Ten Best Jazz Records of 2016	5	
The Village Voice	Pazz & Jop 2016	77	

== Track listing ==
All tracks are written by Jeff Parker, except "Visions" by Bobby Hutcherson.

The New Breed track listing
No.	Title	Length
1.	"Executive Life"	7:38
2.	"Para Ha Tay"	0:49
3.	"Here Comes Ezra"	3:01
4.	"Visions"	4:21
5.	"Jrifted"	7:45
6.	"How Fun It Is to Year Whip"	4:39
7.	"Get Dressed"	3:48
8.	"Cliche"	4:09
Total length:		36:10

2017 deluxe digital edition bonus track
No.	Title	Length
9.	"Logan Hardware Remix" (Makaya McCraven)	9:41
Total length:		45:51

2025 IA11 digital edition bonus tracks
No.	Title	Length
9.	"Beat Headstart"	0:59
10.	"Change"	5:37
Total length:		42:46

== Personnel ==
Credits adapted from liner notes.

- Jeff Parker – electric guitar, Korg MS-20, Wurlitzer electric piano, Mellotron, loops and samplers, MIDI and drum programming, arrangement, production, photography
- Josh Johnson – alto saxophone, flute, clarinet, Wurlitzer electric piano, Mellotron
- Paul Bryan – electric bass guitar, production, engineering, editing, mixing
- Jamire Williams – drums
- Jay Bellerose – drums and percussion (on "Visions")
- Ruby Parker – vocals
- John McEntire – vocal recording
- Dave Cooley – mastering
- Kim Parker-Brown – photography
- Craig Hansen – design
