= Suite for Max Brown =

Studio album by Jeff Parker
- Released: January 24, 2020
- Genre: Jazz
- Length: 39:49
- Labels: International Anthem; Nonesuch
- Producers: Jeff Parker; Paul Bryan

Jeff Parker chronology
Slight Freedom (2016)	Suite for Max Brown (2020)	Forfolks (2021)

Singles from Suite for Max Brown
- 1. "Max Brown" Released: December 2, 2019

Suite for Max Brown is a studio album by American guitarist, composer, and record producer Jeff Parker. It was released on January 24, 2020, through International Anthem Recording Company and Nonesuch Records. It received universal acclaim from critics.

== Background ==
Jeff Parker is an American guitarist, composer, and record producer. Suite for Max Brown is named after and dedicated to his mother, whose maiden name is Maxine Brown. The album's cover features a photograph of her at the age of 19. The album contains nine original tracks, a version of John Coltrane's "After the Rain", and "Gnarciss", which is an interpretation of Joe Henderson's "Black Narcissus". The album includes performances by Parker, Paul Bryan, Josh Johnson, Jamire Williams, Katinka Kleijn, Rob Mazurek, Makaya McCraven, Jay Bellerose, and Nate Walcott. Parker's daughter, Ruby Parker, sings on the opening track "Build a Nest".

The album was released on January 24, 2020, through International Anthem Recording Company and Nonesuch Records. A music video was released for "Max Brown".

== Critical reception ==
Professional ratings
Aggregate scores
Source	Rating
Metacritic	83/100
Review scores
Source	Rating
AllMusic	3.5/5 stars
Pitchfork	8.4/10

According to the review aggregator Metacritic, Suite for Max Brown received "universal acclaim" based on a weighted average score of 83 out of 100 from 4 critic scores.

Nick Roseblade of The Quietus wrote, "There are times when the project could have drifted into a schmaltzy affair, but Parker sticks to his avant-garde roots and delivers his strongest album to date." Steven Arroyo of Pitchfork stated, "While his electric guitar remains a highlight, Parker builds out a fast-slashing range of ideas using dozens of other sounds and instruments, most of which he plays himself."

The album was nominated for Best Jazz Record at the 2021 Libera Awards.

=== Accolades ===
Year-end lists for Suite for Max Brown
Publication	List	Rank	Ref.
The Guardian	The 50 Best Albums of 2020	39	
Magnet	Magnet's Top 25 Albums of 2020	5	
Mojo	The 75 Best Albums of 2020	67	
The Quietus	Quietus Albums of the Year 2020	27	
The Vinyl Factory	Our 50 Favourite Albums of 2020	29	
The Wire	Releases of the Year (2020 Rewind)	6	

== Track listing ==
All tracks are written by Jeff Parker, except "After the Rain" by John Coltrane, and "Gnarciss" which contains elements of "Black Narcissus" by Joe Henderson.

Suite for Max Brown track listing
No.	Title	Length
1.	"Build a Nest" (featuring Ruby Parker)	2:13
2.	"C'mon Now"	0:25
3.	"Fusion Swirl"	5:32
4.	"After the Rain"	4:45
5.	"Metamorphoses"	1:48
6.	"Gnarciss"	2:12
7.	"Lydian"	0:55
8.	"Del Rio"	1:38
9.	"3 for L"	4:47
10.	"Go Away"	4:58
11.	"Max Brown"	10:36
Total length:		39:49

Notes

- "C'mon Now" features samples from the Otis Redding recording "The Happy Song (Dum-Dum)".

== Personnel ==
Credits adapted from liner notes.

- Jeff Parker – piano (1), electric guitar (1, 3, 4, 6–11), vocals (1, 3, 10), Korg MS-20 (1, 5, 8, 9, 11), drums (1, 8), sampler (2, 3, 5, 6, 8, 10), bass guitar (3), percussion (3, 4), glockenspiel (5), sequencer (5), Roland JP-08 (6, 11), MIDI strings (6), MIDI programming (7), pandeiro (7), mbira (8), electric piano (8), production, arrangement, engineering, editing
- Ruby Parker – vocals (1)
- Paul Bryan – bass guitar (4, 6–8, 10, 11), vocals (10), production, engineering, editing, mixing
- Josh Johnson – electric piano (4), alto saxophone (6, 11)
- Jamire Williams – drums (4, 11)
- Katinka Kleijn – cello (6)
- Rob Mazurek – piccolo trumpet (6)
- Makaya McCraven – sampler (6), drums (6, 10)
- Jay Bellerose – drums (9), percussion (9)
- Nate Walcott – trumpet (11)
- Dave Cooley – mastering
- Craig Hansen – design, layout

== Charts ==
Chart performance for Suite for Max Brown
Chart (2020)	Peak position
UK Album Downloads (Official Charts)	60
UK Jazz & Blues Albums (Official Charts)	1
