= Beacons of Ancestorship =

Studio album by Tortoise
- Released: June 23, 2009
- Genre: Post-rock
- Length: 43:39
- Label: Thrill Jockey

Tortoise chronology
A Lazarus Taxon (2006)	Beacons of Ancestorship (2009)	The Catastrophist (2016)

Professional ratings
Aggregate scores
Source	Rating
AnyDecentMusic?	6.7/10
Metacritic	71/100
Review scores
Source	Rating
AllMusic	4/5 stars
The A.V. Club	B+
Consequence of Sound	A−
Mojo	3/5 stars
NME	3.5/5 stars
Pitchfork	7.9/10
PopMatters	7/10
Q	2/5 stars
Resident Advisor	4.0/5
Slant Magazine	4/5 stars

Beacons of Ancestorship is the sixth studio album by American post-rock band Tortoise. It was released on Thrill Jockey in 2009.

== Track listing ==
No.	Title	Length
1.	"High Class Slim Came Floatin' In"	8:14
2.	"Prepare Your Coffin"	3:37
3.	"Northern Something"	2:24
4.	"Gigantes"	6:21
5.	"Penumbra"	1:08
6.	"Yinxianghechengqi"	3:37
7.	"The Fall of Seven Diamonds Plus One"	3:40
8.	"Minors"	4:23
9.	"Monument Six One Thousand"	3:22
10.	"De Chelly"	1:46
11.	"Charteroak Foundation"	5:07
Total length:		43:39

== Charts ==
Chart	Peak position
US Billboard 200	149
US Heatseekers Albums (Billboard)	9
US Independent Albums (Billboard)	25
US Tastemaker Albums (Billboard)	15
