= Starters Alternators =

Studio album by The Ex
- Released: October 20, 1998
- Recorded: June 14–20, 1998 at Electrical Audio, Chicago
- Genre: Art punk; post-punk; noise rock
- Length: 53:19
- Label: Touch and Go Records (US); Ex Records (Netherlands)
- Producer: Steve Albini

The Ex chronology
Instant (1995)	Starters Alternators (1998)	In the Fishtank 5 (2001)

Professional ratings
Review scores
Source	Rating
AllMusic	4/5 stars
Alternative Rock	6/10
Entertainment Weekly	B+
Tom Hull	B+

Starters Alternators is an album by Dutch post-punk band The Ex. It is the band's 10th studio album and was produced by Steve Albini for a 1998 CD released jointly by Touch and Go Records and the band’s own label, Ex Records.

== Reception ==
Jack Rabid reviewed the album for AllMusic, writing: "They just keep pumping out the frightening rhythms, so terse and vicious that they bring back good memories of not only the hardest Fugazi, but older U.S. Midwest outfits with this kind of tight, forward-springing, offbeat rhythmic attack, such as Rifle Sport, Man Sized Action, and, most of all, Rapeman and Shellac. The last two may seem too obvious, since Steve Albini is the man behind the desk for this one -- and he turns in his best, clearest sounding, deepest production since he did the first Breeders LP -- but it's not that simple. Reach back further, to some old live Gang of Four, Killing Joke, or Mekons live tape, and you might generate the precision clash of drums and bass behind atonal guitar patterns found here -- only replace Jon King or Jaz Coleman with 1978-1982 era Public Image singer Johnny Lydon, with less histrionics, and you have singer G.W. Sok's teeth-bared delivery. The man means business, and with words such as "Let me tell you about Karl Marx/A visionary fish in a pool of sharks," he'll make you think for hours."

jgarden of The A.V. Club wrote that "[m]usically, The Ex is about as pretentious as The Spice Girls; its members recognize the beauty of a good hook [...] played with strange Sonic Youth tunings and scraping, squawking guitar sounds set to an ever-shifting drum beat [...] still powerful enough to get your attention. G.W. Sok's neo-Beat vocals are crisp and clipped, sounding alternately like John Lydon and John Cooper-Clarke, so there's no mistaking the political stance behind the upbeat, almost danceable songs. Engineer Steve Albini has done a good job capturing the experience of the live performance; every track hums with organic energy." The reviewer's only complaint was that the first track "Frenzy" "sets the bar so high that the rest of the album can't deliver quite as well." Bob Brunner of Entertainment Weekly wrote that "their latest [...] is full of jagged guitars and impassioned vocals, it’s as creatively abrasive as ever (but not as sophisticated as their work with the late cellist Tom Cora)." Glen Sarvady of CMJ New Music Monthly made similar comparisons to Fugazi and Gang of Four, but wrote that the band were less melodic and that the music can get "wearying" over its run-time. Despite this, he wrote that "for pure visceral wallop, Starters Alternators is hard to beat."

Pitchfork included the album on their list "Touch and Go 25" in 2006, writing that their "songs build not from verses and choruses but truncated chunks of melody, building and releasing tension in a way few other rock bands do or try."

== Track listing ==
1. "Frenzy" - 5:02
2. "Let's Panic Later" - 5:45
3. "I.O.U. (Nought)" - 5:02
4. "Art of Losing" - 5:29
5. "It's a Sin" - 4:23
6. "Two Struck by the Moon" - 3:44
7. "Mother" - 4:02
8. "Bee Coz" - 4:48
9. "Lump Sum Insomnia" - 6:27
10. "Wildebeest" - 4:20
11. "Nem Úgy Van Most" - 4:22

== Personnel and credits ==
- Bass – Luc
- Drums, voice – Katrin
- Guitar – Andy, Terrie
- Music – The Ex (tracks: 1 to 10), Muzsikás (track: 11)
- Photography [Cover], Other [Title] – John Corbett
- Recording – Steve Albini
- Vocals – G.W. Sok
- Lyrics – The Ex (tracks: 1 to 3, 6, 8, 10), Elizabeth Bishop (track: 4), Stephen Crane (track: 5), Egely Donadi (track: 7), Han Buhrs (track: 9), traditional (track: 11)
