= Isotope 217 =

American band

Isotope 217°
- Origin: Chicago, Illinois, United States
- Genres: Jazz-funk, jazz fusion
- Years active: 1997–present
- Labels: Thrill Jockey; Aesthetics
- Members: Dan Bitney; John Herndon; Rob Mazurek; Jeff Parker; Sara P. Smith; Matthew Lux
- Website: Thrill Jockey: Isotope 217°

Isotope 217° is a Chicago-based band composed mainly of members from Tortoise and the Chicago Underground Orchestra that was formed in 1997. The New York Times described the band as "...adept to varying degrees at rock and funk and jazz and electronics, turn those introspective moments into jams that are messier and warmer than Tortoise's."

The name is a reference to Forbidden Planet.

== Discography ==
Album information
The Unstable Molecule
- Released: 1997
- Label: Thrill Jockey
Commander Mindfuck / Designer EP
- Released: 1999
- Label: Aesthetics
Utonian Automatic
- Released: 1999
- Label: Thrill Jockey
Who Stole the I Walkman
- Released: 2000
- Label: Thrill Jockey
