= Bundy K. Brown =

American musician and recording engineer

Bundy Kenneth Brown, also known as Ken Brown or Bundy K. Brown, is an American musician and recording engineer. He is best known for being a founding member of Tortoise and for his production, engineering and remixes in the Chicago post rock scene.

== Musical career ==
In the mid 1980s Ken Brown moved to Chicago to attend The University of Chicago. He got involved with Chicago's independent music scene through the university's radio station, became known as Bundy K. Brown and, before completing his first year of college, dropped out to pursue his music career.

In 1990 guitarist David Grubbs asked Brown to replace bassist Clark Johnson in his band Bastro. In 1991 the group toured Europe and composed new material, much of which was used in Grubbs' and Brown's next project, Gastr del Sol. Brown then moved on, along with Bastro drummer John McEntire to form a new band with Doug McCombs (bass), John Herndon (percussion), and Dan Bitney (percussion). Initially named Mosquito, the band soon renamed itself Tortoise. After recording their first album, Brown left Tortoise, but maintained a close relationship with all of its members, including creating remixes for the band. In 1996 Brown started the more rock-driven band Directions with Rex and June of 44 drummer Doug Scharin and guitarist James Warden, recording one album called In Music. In 1997, Bundy K. Brown formed Pullman with Doug McCombs, Chris Brokaw, and Curtis Harvey, with whom he released two albums.

During this period Bundy K. Brown was also busy recording, engineering and remixing for a variety of bands across the country, including Yo La Tengo, The Sea and Cake, Seam, DJ Food, Rex, Loftus, Chicago Underground Trio, and Calexico.

In 2020, Brown started playing with fellow musicians and friends Tim Ruth (bass) and Britt Walford (drums), but the trio fell apart after not showcasing enough of their work. Brown and Walford started playing again in 2023 along with Tim Barnes (drums). Barnes soon left due to medical complications from early onset dementia, but the duo kept on playing under the name Jungle Boogie. Their first album was released March 14, 2025.
