= Tortoise (band) =

American post-rock band

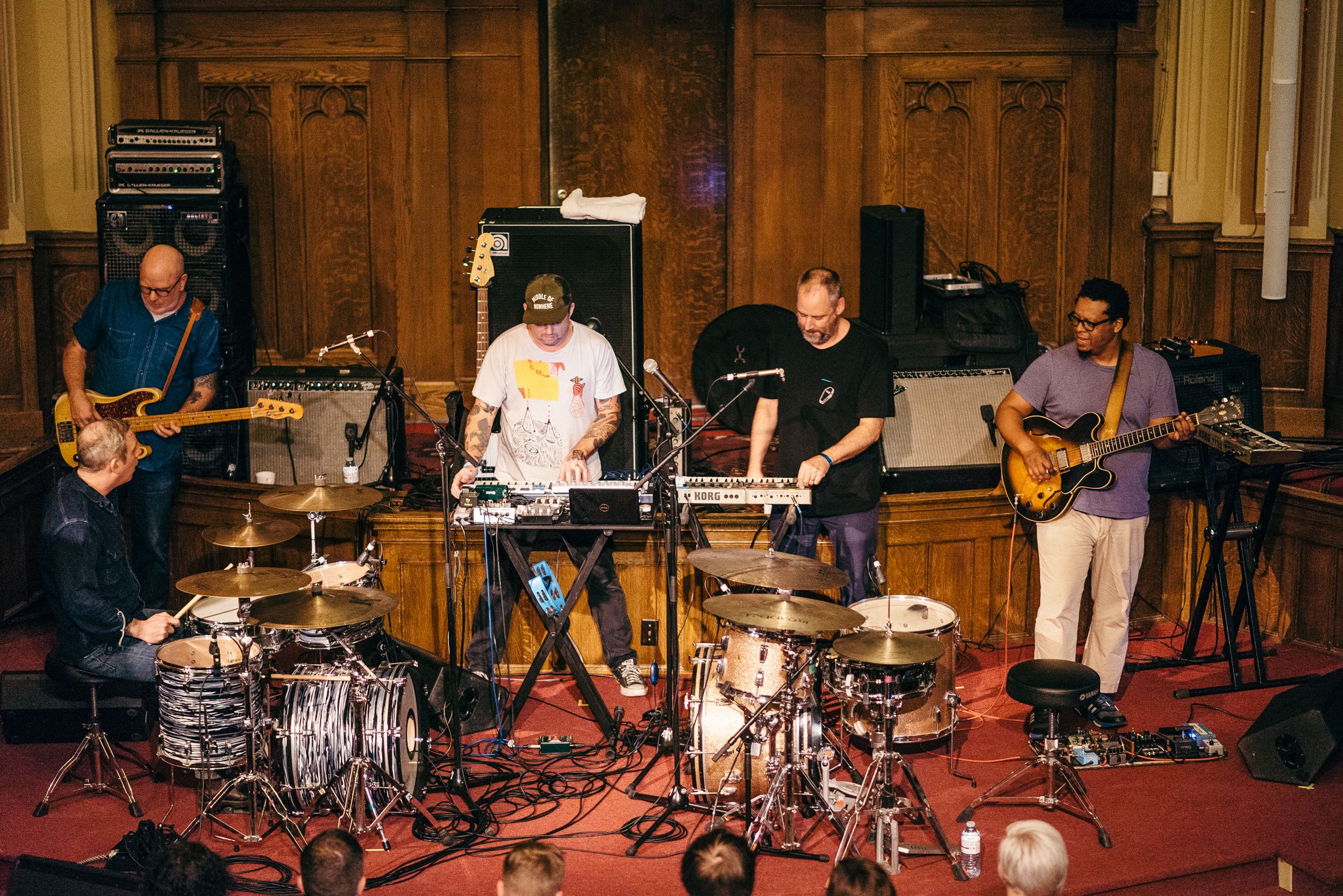
- Tortoise performing in 2016

Background information
- Origin: Chicago, Illinois, U.S.
- Genres: Post-rock
- Years active: 1990–present
- Labels: Thrill Jockey, Warp, City Slang, Domino, International Anthem
- Members: John Herndon; Doug McCombs; John McEntire; Dan Bitney; Jeff Parker
- Past members: Bundy K. Brown; David Pajo
- Website: trts.com

Tortoise is an American post-rock band formed in Chicago, Illinois, in 1990. The band incorporates krautrock, dub, minimal music, electronica and jazz into their music, and their eclectic style has left a great influence on the post-rock genre. Tortoise have been consistently credited, as part of the Chicago school of post-rock, for its rise in the 1990s.

== History ==
=== 1990s ===
The group's origins lie in the late 1980s pairing of Doug McCombs (bassist with Eleventh Dream Day) and drummer John Herndon, who initially wanted to establish themselves as a freelance rhythm section (like reggae legends Sly and Robbie). The idea did not come to fruition, but their interest in grooving rhythms, as well as their recording studio knowledge led to partnerships with drummer John McEntire and bassist Bundy K. Brown (both formerly of Bastro and Gastr Del Sol) joining, followed by percussionist Dan Bitney. Though songs are credited to all the musicians, McEntire became perceived as the group's guiding force, as his contributions mainly took the form of being the recording engineer and mixer.

Their first single was issued in 1993, and their self-titled debut album followed a year later. Instrumental and mostly mid-tempo, Tortoise slowly garnered praise and attention, notably for its unusual instrumentation (two bass guitars, three percussionists switching between drums, vibraphones and marimbas). A remix album followed, Rhythms, Resolutions and Clusters.

Brown left and was replaced by David Pajo (formerly of Slint) for 1996's Millions Now Living Will Never Die, which showed up on many year-end best of lists, and the 20-minute Djed was described by critic John Bush as proof that "Tortoise made experimental rock do double duty as evocative, beautiful music." Also in 1996, the band contributed to the AIDS benefit album Offbeat: A Red Hot Soundtrip produced by the Red Hot Organization.

They released a Japanese-only compilation featuring tracks from the eponymous debut, Rhythms, singles and compilation appearances, named A Digest Compendium of the Tortoise's World on November 21, 1996.

In 1998, Tortoise released TNT, arguably their most jazz-inflected album. Jeff Parker had joined as a guitarist alongside Pajo, who left the band following the album's completion.

=== 2000s–present ===
2001 led to Standards, where Tortoise incorporated more electronic sounds and post-production into its music than in previous works. The band then recorded "Didjeridoo" for the Red Hot Organization's compilation album Red Hot + Indigo, a tribute to Duke Ellington, which raised money for various charities devoted to AIDS related causes. In 2001, the band curated an edition of the British All Tomorrow's Parties festival. They then returned in 2004 to curate another day of the same event.

It's All Around You was released in 2004. In 2006, Tortoise collaborated with Bonnie 'Prince' Billy on an album of covers entitled The Brave and the Bold, and released A Lazarus Taxon, a box set containing two CDs of single tracks and remixes, a third CD with an expanded Rhythms, Resolutions and Clusters (out of print) and a DVD of videos and film of live performances.

Bitney and McEntire also contributed to the Bright Eyes album Cassadaga. The group has worked with multi-instrumentalist Paul Duncan of the band Warm Ghost.

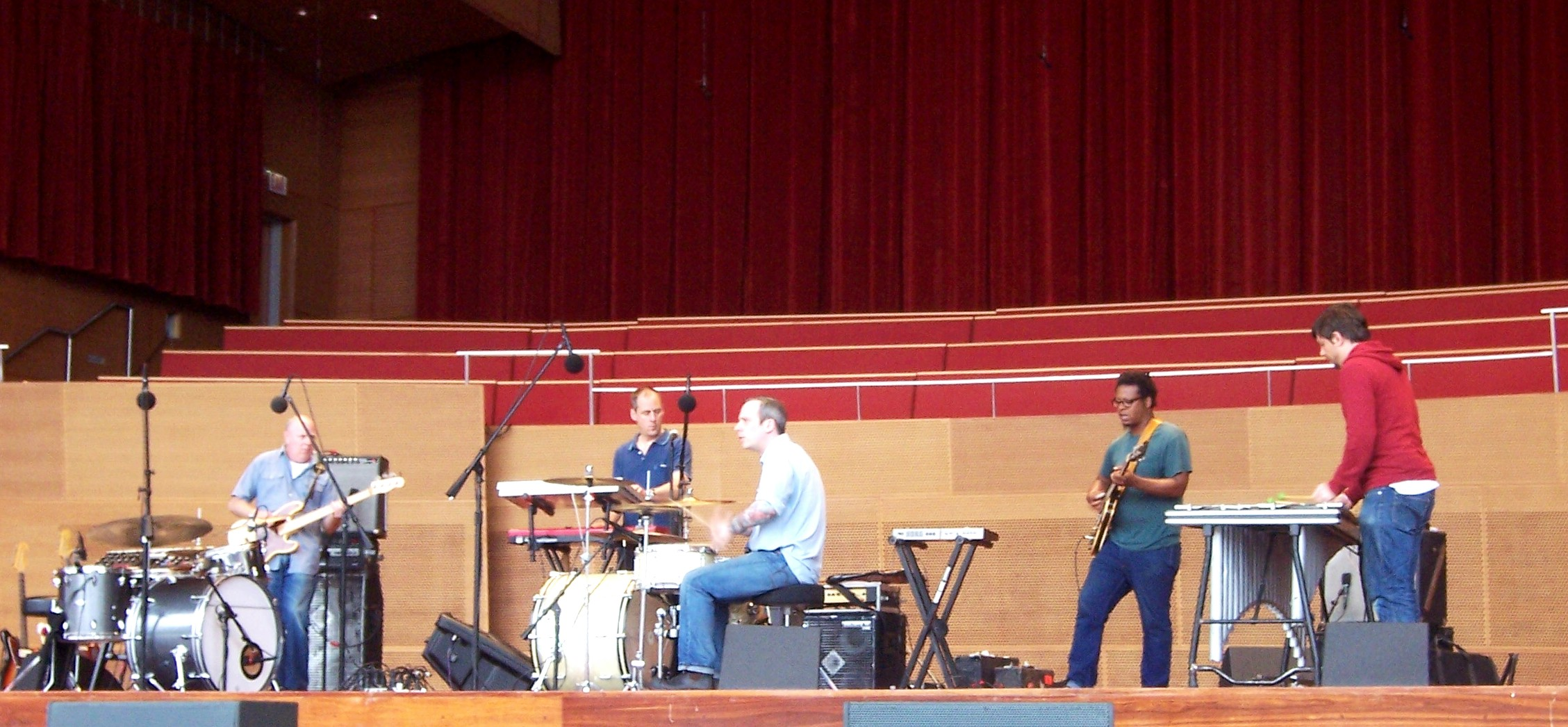
Tortoise performing at the Pritzker Pavilion, Chicago (2008)

Tortoise released their sixth album, Beacons of Ancestorship, on June 23, 2009. The band toured the Midwestern US in September and October 2009, and then in Europe in November and December. The band performed at the ATP New York 2010 music festival, which was held in Monticello, New York.

In 2012, Tortoise wrote and recorded the soundtrack to Eduardo Sánchez's Lovely Molly, a psychological horror film partly inspired by traditional folk songs. A seventh studio album, The Catastrophist, was released by Thrill Jockey in early 2016, preceded by the single "Gesceap".

Touch, the band's eighth studio album, was released in 2025.

== Musical style ==
As Tortoise rose to prominence in their early career, their often instrumental music has been noted for its ambiguous categorization. The members have roots in Chicago's fertile music scene, playing in various indie rock and punk rock groups. Tortoise was among the first American indie rock bands to incorporate styles closer to krautrock, dub, minimal music, electronica and various jazz styles, rather than the strong rock and roll roots that had dominated the genre. Tortoise has been cited as one of the prime forces behind the development and popularity of the post-rock movement. CMJ writer Jim Allen highlighted the influence of progressive rock on Tortoise's post-rock style.

The band's unique songwriting method, described by Jeff Parker as "the Tortoise style", consists of "[taking] two or three different ideas for songs and then smash them together to try and make one song." According to Parker, certain songs are "introduced" by individual members, while John Herndon has stated that sometimes members will "come in with different ideas, little kernels of a tune, maybe just one riff. One of the three of us [Herndon, Dan Bitney, or John McEntire] will be drumming and that gives the others the opportunity to experiment by picking up a guitar or a vibraphone or a marimba. One of us might have one idea, and the music flows from there."

Members of Tortoise have formed and performed in many side projects, including The Sea and Cake, Brokeback, Slint, Isotope 217, Chicago Odense Ensemble, Tar Babies, and the Chicago Underground Duo. Tortoise records on the Thrill Jockey label.

== Members ==
Current members

- John Herndon – drums, vibraphone, keyboards, sequencing, electronics (1990–present)
- Doug McCombs – bass, guitar, lap steel guitar (1990–present)
- John McEntire – drums, modular synthesizer, guitar, electric harpsichord, keyboards, electronics, production, recording, editing, mixing (1991–present)
- Dan Bitney – drums, percussion, vibraphone, marimba, keyboards, baritone saxophone, bass, guitar, electronics (1993–present)
- Jeff Parker – guitar, bass (1996–present)

Past members

- Bundy K. Brown – bass, guitar (1991–1994)
- David Pajo – guitar, bass (1995–1998)

Timeline

== Discography ==
=== Studio albums ===
- Tortoise (1994)
- Millions Now Living Will Never Die (1996)
- TNT (1998)
- Standards (2001)
- It's All Around You (2004)
- Beacons of Ancestorship (2009)
- The Catastrophist (2016)
- Touch (2025)

=== Other releases ===
- In the Fishtank 5 (1999) – EP, collaboration with The Ex
- "Gently Cupping the Chin of the Ape" (2001) – two track tour CD with enhanced content
- The Brave and the Bold (2006) – covers album, collaboration with Bonnie 'Prince' Billy
- A Lazarus Taxon (2006) – compilation box set of rare material, 3 CDs and 1 DVD
- Why Waste Time? (2010) – Japan-only tour EP, Enhanced CD

=== Remix albums and compilations ===
- Rhythms, Resolutions & Clusters (1995) – remix album
- A Digest Compendium of the Tortoise's World (1996) – Japan-only compilation featuring tracks from debut album, remixes and singles
- Remixed (1998) – remix album (2001 re-release with additional remix from Autechre)
- Metro: The Official Bootleg Series, Volume 1 (2010) – live compilation, one Tortoise track
- Grand Theft Auto: Chinatown Wars (2009) – a dedicated Tortoise radio station in the iOS/Android/PSP version
- Yanni Live at the Acropolis (2010) – part of Beck's online musical project Record Club; collaboration with Beck, Thurston Moore and Brian LeBarton

=== Singles and music videos ===
- 1996 – "Glass Museum"
- 1996 – "Dear Grandma and Grandpa"
- 1998 – "The Suspension Bridge at Iguazú Falls"
- 1998 – "Four-Day Interval"
- 2001 – "Seneca"
- 2004 – "Salt the Skies"
- 2004 – "It's All Around You"
- 2004 – "Galapagos"
- 2009 – "Prepare Your Coffin"
- 2016 – "Yonder Blue"
- 2025 – "Oganesson"
- 2025 – "Works and Days"
- 2025 – "Layered Presence"
- 2025 – "A Title Comes"
- 2025 – "Rated OG"
