= Soma (studio) =

Recording studio in California

Soma Electronic Music Studios is a recording studio owned and operated by John McEntire. From 1993 to 2018 it was located in Chicago, Illinois.

Artists who have recorded at Soma include Bundy K. Brown, Brokeback, Broken Social Scene, Chicago Underground Duo, Bobby Conn, David Grubbs, Isotope 217, Rob Mazurek, Nobukazu Takemura, Jim O'Rourke, Pivot, Radian, Phil Ranelin, Red Krayola, The Research (band), Royal Trux, Neil Michael Hagerty, The Sea and Cake, Stereolab, Teenage Fanclub, Tortoise, Wilco, Will Oldham, Papa M, Vaudevileins, and The Car Is on Fire.

In 2018, McEntire closed the Chicago facility and relocated to Nevada City, California, where he opened "Soma Electronic Music Studios 4.0 aka Soma West".
