= A Grape Dope =

American drummer and producer

- Also known as: Johnny Machine, A Grape Dope
- Born: John Herndon; April 8, 1966 (age 60); Long Island, New York, U.S.
- Origin: Chicago, Illinois, U.S.
- Genres: Instrumental hip hop, indie hip hop, jazz, post-rock, electronica, progressive rock, dub
- Occupations: Producer, musician
- Instrument: Drums
- Years active: 1990–present
- Label: Galaxia
- Spouse: Kathryn Frazier
- Website: www.trts.com

John Herndon (born April 8, 1966) is an American musician and artist. Based in Chicago, he is a founding member of the post-rock band Tortoise, where he plays drums and percussion.

Herndon also works as a producer for instrumental hip hop under the name A Grape Dope.

== Early life ==
Herndon was born in 1966 on Long Island, New York. He was the second child of his family, with a brother two years older than him. After his family moved to Boston, Herndon's father was jailed and his mother was a drug addict, so the children were put into the foster care system when Herndon was a toddler. He described the experience as abusive. He remained in the system until his father was released from prison in 1971.

In 1976, Herndon moved to the North Carolina mountains with the Grateful Union Family Trust, a commune that Herndon's father and his girlfriend were a part of.

== Career ==
John Herndon is a member of the bands Tortoise and Isotope 217, playing mainly drums but some other percussion (vibraphone, etc.) and occasional keyboards. He produced Deep Puddle Dynamics' song "More from June" in 2002. He released the Missing Dragons EP under the alias A Grape Dope on Galaxia in 2003. It features a guest appearance by rapper Doseone.

== Personal life ==
Herndon resides in Los Angeles, California. He has two children, one of whom is noted rapper and producer 2hollis, the other being the vocalist for the Los Angeles based straight edge hardcore punk band Start Today.

== Discography ==
=== Albums ===
- Backyard Bangers (2020)

=== EPs ===
- Immediate Action (2000)
- Missing Dragons (2003)

=== Productions ===
- Deep Puddle Dynamics - "More from June" from We Ain't Fessin' (Double Quotes) (2002)

=== Contributions ===
- Themselves - "You Devil You" and "Hat in the Wind" from The No Music (2002)
- Doseone - "By Horoscope Light I&II" from Ha (2005)

=== Remixes ===
- Tommy Guerrero - "Birds Over Head (John Herndon Remix)" from Junk Collector (2001)
- Trans Am - "Cold War" from Extremixxx (2002)
- Themselves - "Dr. Moonorgun Please" from The No Music of AIFFS (2003)
- Via Tania - "On Sawyer" from Boltanski (2004)
- Via Tania - "Felt Cave" from True (2005)
