= Doug McCombs =

Douglas McCombs
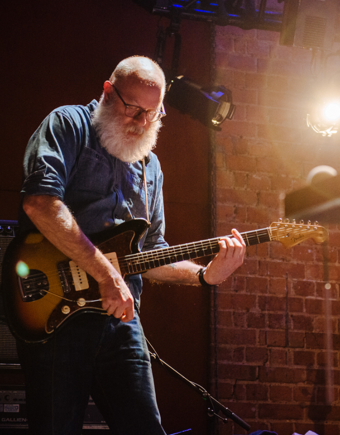
- Douglas McCombs with Tortoise in London, February 2016

Background information
- Born: Douglas McCombs; Peoria, Illinois
- Occupation: Musician
- Instruments: Bass guitar, lap slide guitar, guitar

Douglas McCombs (1962) is an American musician who plays bass and guitar with the instrumental post-rock band Tortoise and leads the instrumental band Brokeback. He is also the longtime bassist for the rock band Eleventh Dream Day. In 1997, he formed Pullman with Bundy K. Brown, Chris Brokaw, and Curtis Harvey, with whom he released two albums. In May 2018, McCombs replaced Eric Claridge as the touring bassist with Chicago jazz-pop outfit the Sea and Cake.

== Brokeback ==
Brokeback is a project of McCombs. It has featured the following artists:

- Rob Mazurek
- Noel Kupersmith
- Mary Hansen (Stereolab)
- James McNew (Yo La Tengo)
- Chad Taylor (Chicago Underground Duo)
- Tim Foljahn (Two Dollar Guitar)
- James Elkington (The Zincs, Tweedy, The Horse's Ha)
- R. Christopher Hansen (Pinebender)
- Areif Sless-Kitain
- Pete Croke

=== Discography ===
- Another Routine Day Breaks, (Hi-Ball Records, 1997)
- Returns to the Orange Grove (Thrill Jockey, 1997)
- Field Recordings from Cook County Water Table (Thrill Jockey, 1999)
- Morse Code In The Modern Age: Across The Americas (Thrill Jockey, 2001)
- Looks at the Bird (Thrill Jockey 2003)
- Brokeback and the Black Rock (Thrill Jockey, 2013)
- Illinois River Valley Blues (Thrill Jockey, 2017)
- VMAK<KOMBZ<<<DUGLAS<<6NDR7<<< (Thrill Jockey, 2022)
