= Black Jazz Signature =

Compilation album by Theo Parrish
- Released: September 3, 2013
- Genre: Jazz
- Length: 77:08
- Label: Snow Dog

Theo Parrish chronology
Sound Signature Sounds Vol. 2 (2012)	Black Jazz Signature (2013)	American Intelligence (2014)

Professional ratings
Aggregate scores
Source	Rating
Metacritic	84/100
Review scores
Source	Rating
AllMusic	4/5 stars
Exclaim!	9/10
Fact	4.5/5
Resident Advisor	4.0/5
XLR8R	8/10

Black Jazz Signature is a compilation album by American artist Theo Parrish. It was released through Snow Dog Records in 2013. The album features tracks from the 1970s record label Black Jazz Records.

== Critical reception ==
At Metacritic, which assigns a weighted average score out of 100 to reviews from mainstream critics, the album received an average score of 84% based on 5 reviews, indicating "universal acclaim".

Steve Shaw of Fact gave the album a 4.5 out of 5, saying, "Black Jazz Signature captures a sheer flood of music, parts crashing and reforming around each other as they break away, jut out, drop back, or lace themselves around others." Michael Harkin of XLR8R gave the album an 8 out of 10, saying, "the mix has the feeling of a continuous, subtly shifting jam that continually stirs and stimulates, much like Parrish's sets behind the decks."

Resident Advisor placed it at number 5 on their list of the top 10 official mixes of 2013.

== Track listing ==
No.	Title	Artist(s)	Length
1.	"Trance Dance"	Doug Carn	8:32
2.	"My Favorite Things"	Gene Russell	4:40
3.	"March On"	The Awakening	5:29
4.	"Convulsions"	The Awakening	5:27
5.	"Jupiter"	The Awakening	6:21
6.	"Criss Cross"	Rudolph Johnson	5:46
7.	"The Highest Pleasure"	Rudolph Johnson	7:37
8.	"Those Who Chant"	Walter Bishop Jr.	7:35
9.	"Mirage"	The Awakening	7:58
10.	"B.E."	Calvin Keys	7:22
11.	"Time and Space"	Rudolph Johnson	7:25
12.	"Blue Bossa"	Walter Bishop Jr.	2:56
