= Blue Mitchell (album) =

Studio album by Blue Mitchell
- Released: 1971
- Recorded: March 22, 1971
- Genre: Jazz
- Length: 30:48
- Label: Mainstream; MRL 315
- Producer: Bob Shad

Blue Mitchell chronology
Bantu Village (1969)	Blue Mitchell (1971)	Vital Blue (1971)

Blue Mitchell (also known as Soul Village) is an album by American trumpeter Blue Mitchell recorded in 1971 and released on the Mainstream label.

The album features a composition titled "Soul Village" that is credited to Blue Mitchell. Pianist Walter Bishop, Jr., who plays on Blue Mitchell, also recorded the "Soul Village" for his albums Keeper of My Soul (1973) and Soul Village (1977). On both Bishop albums, the composition was credited to Bishop.

== Reception ==
The AllMusic review by Scott Yanow awarded the album 4 stars stating "In general, Blue Mitchell's five Mainstream albums from 1971-74 are not on the same level as his best Blue Notes, but they tend to be worthwhile".

Professional ratings
Review scores
Source	Rating
AllMusic	4/5 stars

== Track listing ==
All compositions by Blue Mitchell except as indicated

1. "Soul Village" – 6:16
2. "Blues For Thelma" – 7:03
3. "Queen Bey" – 4:51
4. "Are You Real" (Benny Golson, Sergio Mihanovich) – 7:21
5. "Mi Hermano" – 5:17
- Recorded in New York City in March 1971.

== Personnel ==
- Blue Mitchell – trumpet
- Jimmy Forrest – tenor saxophone
- Walter Bishop, Jr. – piano
- Larry Gales – bass
- Doug Sides – drums
