= Taeko Fukao =

Japanese Jazz singer

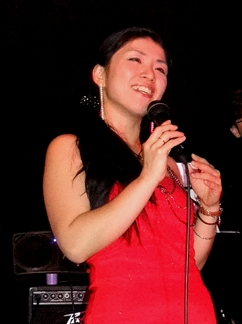
- Taeko Fukao performing in 2010
- Born: Kyoto
- Occupation: jazz singer

Taeko Fukao (深尾 多恵子, Fukao Taeko), known professionally as Songbird TAeKO and formerly TAEKO, is a Japanese jazz singer from Shiga Prefecture, Japan. Fukao is based in Kyoto, but travels extensively throughout the United States and Japan performing in jazz festivals and jazz club venues. In between national and local appearances she has recorded albums for Flat Nine Records.

== Career ==
Fukao started her professional singing career as an R&B singer while studying law at Doshisha University in Kyoto. Her interest in black music such as soul and jazz brought her to New York City in 1998. After six months of study in the US, Fukao returned to Japan where she continued to pursue her music career. She won a grand prize at the 1999 Satin Dall Jazz Competition in Kobe, Japan. Although she found the Japanese jazz scene interesting, Fukao knew that in order to fully understand jazz, she would have to return to New York City.

Fukao returned to New York City in 2000, and started to work in small venues such as Carpo's Cafe, San Marco, New Tokyo in Downtown Manhattan. In mid-2003, she became a featured artist at Mobay Uptown in Harlem. She made her first appearance at the Blue Note Jazz Club in New York in late 2003.

After a few years of regular jazz club appearances between the US and Japan such as Zinc Bar, Lenox Lounge, Saint Nick's Pub in New York, J in Tokyo, and Mister Kelly's in Osaka, Fukao has released her first album with Flat Nine Records in New York in late 2007, titled One Love. In the same year, Fukao won a finalist position at the Jazz Vocal Competition presented by Jazzmobile, Inc. held in New York City. Taeko has first appeared at: The Women in Jazz Festival in New York in 2009 along with Annie Ross and Cynthia Scott, presented by the International Women in Jazz, Inc.; the Hartford Jazz Society's Monday Night Jazz Concert Series at the Bushnell Park in Hartford, Connecticut in 2009; the Biwako Jazz Festival in Shiga, Japan in 2010; the Okazaki Jazz Street in Aichi, Japan in 2010; and the Cape May Jazz Festival in New Jersey, USA in November 2010. Fukao has sung the National Anthem at the annual Japan Run in Central Park since 2011. Fukao was also a featured artist at the 5th annual Japan Day at Central Park in New York City 2011. In 2012, Fukao was featured in the North East Florida Jazz Festival at the Ormond Beach Center for the Performing Arts along with Marcus Roberts, Wallace Roney, and Doug Carn.

Fukao recorded her second album with Flat Nine Records in 2010, titled Voice. She recorded compositions by various American and Japanese artists such as Herbie Hancock, Wayne Shorter, Duke Ellington, Sly and the Family Stone, Marvin Gaye, Ryoichi Hattori, Taro Oguchi, and Doug Carn, a Florida-based American jazz pianist who is best known for a series of his recordings for Black Jazz Records in the 1970s. Fukao was hired for Doug Carn's group in early 2011 and toured the U.S.

In 2013 Fukao released a third studio album Wonderland (again through Flat Nine Records). The album features other prominent jazz artists including Doug Carn, Lonnie Plaxico, and Victor Jones.

TAEKO has routinely performed at Birdland, the world-famous jazz club in New York City, since 2016.

In 2018 TAEKO was featured at the 30th Annual ECOFEST in Times Square, New York City, where she sang the American and Japanese National Anthems. TAEKO also recorded the vocals for the Japanese commercial for the Apple Watch Series 4 (singing a Japanese version of the Hokey Pokey). The commercial aired in Japan in October 2018, and received over 2 million views within a month of its release.

TAEKO's 4th album was released in summer 2019.

A biographical book about TAEKO, titled "Untraveled" and written by Japanese writer and journalist Tomomi Uriu, was released in Japan in June 2019 during TAEKO's Japan Tour. The book was published by Hon-to Bungei-no Mori Corporation and distributed by JEUGIA Basic in Kyoto. The jazz magazine Hot House featured TAEKO in a full-page interview to discuss the album two weeks before release.

During the COVID-19 pandemic, TAEKO relocated from New York City back to Kyoto. There, she launched a 7-member all-female band called TAEKO's Kyoto Women Jazz Band which held its debut concert at ALTI concert hall in Kyoto on March 31, 2023. Also in 2023, TAEKO debuted as a professional koto player and has been performing Japanese classic koto pieces at hotels and events such as Garrya Kyoto Nijo and Kurochiku.

Taeko officially rebranded as Songbird TAeKO with the launch of her live-recorded 5th album Here's to Life, which was released from Time Machine Records Japan in May 2024. Songbird TAeKO conducted a nationwide launch tour in Japan from late April through early June 2024.

== Discography ==
- Taeko (self-release, 1999)
- Stories of Life (self-release, 2002)
- You Taught My Heart to Sing (self-release, 2004)
- One Love (Flat Nine, 2007)
- Voice (Flat Nine, 2010)
- Wonderland (Flat Nine, 2013)
- Contemplation (Flat Nine, 2019)
- Here's to Life (Time Machine Records, 2024)
