= Coral Keys =

Studio album by Walter Bishop Jr.
- Released: 1971
- Recorded: 1971
- Genre: Jazz
- Length: 42:39
- Label: Black Jazz BJ/2
- Producer: Gene Russell

Walter Bishop Jr. chronology
| Bish Bash (1975) | Coral Keys (1971) | Keeper of My Soul (1973) |

Coral Keys is an album led by pianist Walter Bishop Jr. which was recorded in 1971 and originally released on the Black Jazz label.

Professional ratings
Review scores
| Source | Rating |
|---|---|
| AllMusic | 4.5/5 stars |

== Track listing ==
All compositions by Walter Bishop Jr.

1. "Coral Keys" – 5:44
2. "Waltz for Zweetie" – 5:22
3. "Track Down" – 6:30
4. "Soul Turn Around" – 5:31
5. "Our November" – 5:15
6. "Three Loves" – 4:44
7. "Freedom Suite" – 9:33

== Personnel ==
- Walter Bishop Jr. – piano
- Woody Shaw – trumpet (tracks 5–7)
- Harold Vick – flute, soprano saxophone, tenor saxophone
- Reggie Johnson – bass
- Alan Shwaetz Benger (tracks 5–7), Idris Muhammad (tracks 1–4) – drums
