= Conversations I =

Studio album by Roscoe Mitchell with Craig Taborn and Kikanju Baku
- Released: February 14, 2014
- Recorded: September 13 and 14, 2013
- Studio: Wide Hive Records Berkeley, CA
- Genre: Jazz
- Length: 76:27
- Label: Wide Hive; WH-0317
- Producer: Gregory Howe

Roscoe Mitchell chronology
Improvisations (2013)	Conversations I (2014)	Conversations II (2014)

Conversations I is an album by American jazz saxophonist Roscoe Mitchell, with pianist with Craig Taborn and drummer Kikanju Baku which was recorded in 2013 and released on Wide Hive.

== Reception ==
Professional ratings
Review scores
Source	Rating
DownBeat	4/5 stars

In his review for Something Else!, S. Victor Allen states, "Conversations I revels in its random, extemporaneous intonations, offering proof that ideas Roscoe Mitchell first put forth in the mid-60's are nowhere near exhausted. It's the kind of album that demands an encore, and wouldn't you know there's one coming: Conversations II"

Regarding Conversations I and II, DownBeat's Bill Meyer commented: "Both of these CDs are remarkably consistent; the engagement and invention never flags, which makes it hard to favor one over the other... Not only is the sound crisp and immaculate, it imparts a spacial experience that makes it feel like the music is happening all around the listener."

== Track listing ==
All compositions by Roscoe Mitchell, Craig Taborn and Kikanju Baku except were noted

1. "Knock and Roll" – 8:21
2. "Ride the Wind" – 7:38
3. "Distant Radio Transmission" – 15:13
4. "Rub" – 4:10
5. "Who Dat" – 6:37
6. "Splatter" – 4:55
7. "Cracked Roses" – 6:10
8. "Outpost Nine Calling" (Mitchell, Taborn) – 9:12
9. "Darse" – 5:53
10. "Last Trane to Clover Five" – 9:08

== Personnel ==
- Roscoe Mitchell - saxophone, flute
- Craig Taborn – piano, organ, synthesizer
- Kikanju Baku – drums, percussion
