= Soliloquy (disambiguation) =

Soliloquy (from Latin: "talking by oneself") is a device often used in drama.

Soliloquy may also refer to:

- Soliloquy (2002 film), a 2002 film by Jacques Zanetti, starring Diahnne Abbott and Drena De Niro
- Soliloquy (McCoy Tyner album), a 1991 live album by McCoy Tyner
- Soliloquy (Walter Bishop Jr. album) a 1977 solo album by Walter Bishop Jr.
- "Soliloquy" (song), a 1945 song composed by Richard Rodgers
- "Soliloquy", the sixth section of the 1976 Rush song "2112"

== See also ==
- Soliloquy for Lilith, a 1988 album by Nurse with Wound
- Soliloquy of the Spanish Cloister, written by Robert Browning, first published in 1842
- Soliloquies of Augustine, a two-book document written in 386–387 AD by the Christian theologian Augustine of Hippo.
