= Anaya (album) =

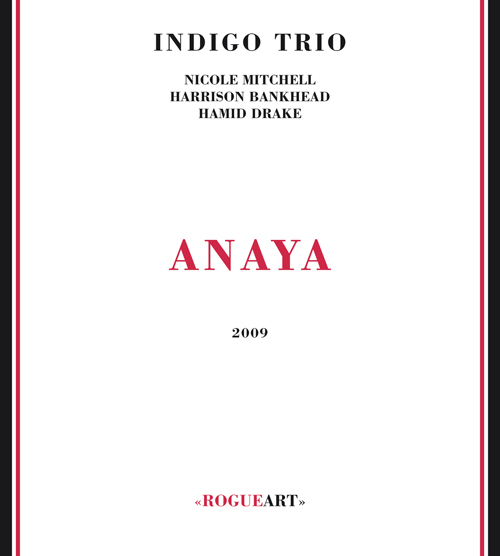

Studio album by Nicole Mitchell
- Released: 2009
- Recorded: June 11 & 12, 2008
- Studio: Leon Lee Dorsey Studio, New York City
- Genre: Jazz
- Length: 68:01
- Label: RogueArt
- Producer: Michel Dorbon

Nicole Mitchell chronology
Xenogenesis Suite (2008)	Anaya (2009)	Renegades (2009)

Anaya is an album by American jazz flautist Nicole Mitchell, which was recorded in 2008 and released on the French RogueArt label. It was the second recording by her Indigo Trio, a collective group with bassist Harrison Bankhead and drummer Hamid Drake.

== Reception ==
The All About Jazz review by John Sharpe notes that "Any set featuring the Chicago triumvirate of master drummer Hamid Drake and bassist and cellist Harrison Bankhead alongside Mitchell is going to focus on infectious world rhythms, extemporized harmonies, and adventurous soloing, but it all comes together superbly on this well recorded studio set, with time well-taken to ensure they're on the money."

== Track listing ==
1. "Sho Ya Right" (Nicole Mitchell) – 8:10
2. "A Child's Curiosity" (Harrison Bankhead) – 13:10
3. "Anaya with the Sunlight" (Hamid Drake) – 13:58
4. "Song for Ma'at (Ma-ah-t)" (Mitchell, Bankhead, Drake) – 8:48
5. "Beloved's Reflection" (Nicole Mitchell) – 5:38
6. "Wheatgrass" (Nicole Mitchell) – 7:19
7. "Anaya with the Moon" (Hamid Drake) – 8:34
8. "Affirmation of the One" (Harrison Bankhead) – 2:25

== Personnel ==
- Nicole Mitchell – flute, alto flute, piccolo
- Harrison Bankhead – bass, cello
- Hamid Drake – frame drum
