= Conversations II =

Studio album by Roscoe Mitchell with Craig Taborn and Kikanju Baku
- Released: April 15, 2014
- Recorded: September 13 and 14, 2013
- Studios: Wide Hive Records, Berkeley, California
- Genre: Jazz
- Length: 63:10
- Labels: Wide Hive; WH-0319
- Producer: Gregory Howe

Roscoe Mitchell chronology
Conversations I (2014)	Conversations II (2014)	In Pursuit of Magic (2014)

Conversations II is an album by American jazz saxophonist Roscoe Mitchell, with pianist Craig Taborn and drummer Kikanju Baku which was recorded in 2013 and released on Wide Hive.

== Reception ==
Professional ratings
Review scores
Source	Rating
DownBeat	4/5 stars

In his review for Sydney Morning Herald, John Shand states, "Here the anguished energy of the '60s continues to burn (as it does in St Louis) in a series improvisations so dense that it is like peering through the layers of paint on a Jackson Pollock painting. Its very relentlessness is thrilling, independently of the high levels of invention, but it is assuredly not for the faint-hearted"

Regarding Conversations I and II, DownBeat's Bill Meyer commented: "Both of these CDs are remarkably consistent; the engagement and invention never flags, which makes it hard to favor one over the other... Not only is the sound crisp and immaculate, it imparts a spacial experience that makes it feel like the music is happening all around the listener."

== Track listing ==
All compositions by Roscoe Mitchell, Craig Taborn and Kikanju Baku except were noted

1. "Frenzy House" – 6:03
2. "Chipper and Bing" – 10:26
3. "Stay Hayfer" – 5:32
4. "They Rode for Them" (Mitchell, Baku) – 3:45
5. "I'll See You Out There" – 5:20
6. "Wha-Wha" (Mitchell, Taborn) – 2:26
7. "Bells in the Wind" – 7:58
8. "Shards and Lemons" (Mitchell, Taborn) – 3:41
9. "Just Talking" – 5:12
10. "Next Step" – 3:32
11. "Fly Over and Stay a While" – 9:42

== Personnel ==
- Roscoe Mitchell - flute, saxophone
- Craig Taborn – piano, organ, synthesizer
- Kikanju Baku – drums, percussion
