= Vision Quest =

A vision quest is a Native American rite of passage.

Vision Quest may also refer to:

- Vision Quest (novel), a 1979 novel by Terry Davis
  - Vision Quest (film), a 1985 American drama film based on the novel
- "Vision Quest", a comic storyline in West Coast Avengers by Marvel Comics
- VisionQuest, a 2026 miniseries in the Marvel Cinematic Universe
- "Vision Quest", a 2015 episode of Archer season 6

== Music ==
- Vision Quest Records, a Japanese record label
- Vision Quest (album), a 2001 album by jazz flautist Nicole Mitchell
- "Vision Quest", a song by Clutch from the 2018 album Book of Bad Decisions
- Visionquest, former name of Japanese melodic death metal band Blood Stain Child
