= Duets with Tyshawn Sorey and Special Guest Hugh Ragin =

Studio album by Roscoe Mitchell
- Released: March 26, 2013
- Recorded: June 29, 2012
- Genre: Jazz
- Length: 66:36
- Label: Wide Hive; WH-0311
- Producer: Steve Lake

Roscoe Mitchell chronology
Three Compositions (2012)	Duets with Tyshawn Sorey and Special Guest Hugh Ragin (2013)	Improvisations (2013)

Duets with Tyshawn Sorey and Special Guest Hugh Ragin is an album by American jazz saxophonist Roscoe Mitchell, which was recorded in 2012 and released on Wide Hive.

== Reception ==
Professional ratings
Review scores
Source	Rating
AllMusic	4/5 stars
All About Jazz	5/5 stars

In his review for AllMusic, Fred Thomas states, "Playing spare percussion as well as a bevy of saxophones, flutes, and woodwinds, Mitchell joins in with his collaborators to create a patient, fragmented sonic environment, full of floating and curious sounds. Occasional bursts of energetic sound are more playful than aggressive, though even the more brash and outgoing sounds have a particularly insular feel to them." All About Jazz said "The record is new, but the mystery is always the same. From what planet does Roscoe Mitchell's music come from? ... Every track on this CD is full of ideas."

== Track listing ==
All compositions by Roscoe Mitchell except were noted

1. "The Horn" – 2:03
2. "The Way Home" (Mitchell, Tyshawn Sorey) – 7:15
3. "Bells in the Air" (Mitchell, Sorey, Hugh Ragin) – 11:17
4. "Out There" – 4:02
5. "Scrunch" (Mitchell, Ragin, Sorey) – 8:44
6. "A Cactus and a Rose" – 4:16
7. "Chant" – 8:56
8. "Meadows" – 2:06
9. "A Game of Catch" (Mitchell, Sorey) – 7:25
10. "Waves" (Mitchell, Ragin, Sorey) – 8:19
11. "Windows with a View" – 2:13

== Personnel ==
- Roscoe Mitchell - saxophone
- Hugh Ragin – trumpet
- Tyshawn Sorey – drums
