= Black Unstoppable =

Studio album by Nicole Mitchell
- Released: 2007
- Recorded: May 28 & 30, 2007
- Studio: Riverside Studios, Chicago
- Genre: Jazz
- Length: 71:09
- Label: Delmark
- Producer: Nicole Mitchell, Steve Wagner

Nicole Mitchell chronology
Indigo Trio: Live in Montreal (2007)	Black Unstoppable (2007)	Xenogenesis Suite (2008)

Black Unstoppable is an album by American jazz flautist Nicole Mitchell, which was recorded in 2007 and released on Delmark. It was the fourth album by her Black Earth Ensemble and the first for Delmark after three recordings on Dreamtime, the label she established with David Boykin. According to Mitchell, this project features a diverse collection of songs that touch all sides of Great Black Music: avant-garde jazz, blues, R&B and soul. The group ranges in size from a quartet to a nonet.

== Reception ==
Professional ratings
Review scores
Source	Rating
AllMusic	4.5/5 stars
The Penguin Guide to Jazz	3.5/4 stars

In his review for AllMusic, Michael G. Nastos states "Black Unstoppable documents Mitchell's complete concept, diverse thoughts, and ever potent musical gifts without resorting to existential theories - a woman's touch definitely gracing the powerful AACM aesthetic in a very positive light."

The Penguin Guide to Jazz notes that "The music is utterly fresh and contemporary, but it has unmistakably nostalgic connotations. Mitchell's Black Earth Ensemble is a throwback to the early days of AACM, except there were next to no female leaders making records 40 years ago."

In a review for JazzTimes David Whiteis says "Few flutists can summon the variety of tones, textures, emotional realms and degrees of light from the instrument that Mitchell can: alternately eider-down tender, knifelike, declamatory and spiritually seeking, her sound — and the fearless way in which she prods her melodic ideas into new, unexpected directions — sometimes seems to invoke virtually the entire range of human possibilities over the course of a solo."

== Track listing ==
All compositions by Nicole Mitchell

1. "Cause and Effect" – 7:01
2. "Black Unstoppable" – 7:21
3. "February" – 5:39
4. "Love Has No Boundaries" – 8:48
5. "Sun Cycles" – 7:54
6. "The Creator Has Other Plans for Me" – 12:43
7. "Life Wants You to Love" – 9:04
8. "Navigator" – 4:02
9. "Thanking the Universe" – 8:37

== Personnel ==
- Nicole Mitchell - flute, alto flute, piccolo
- David Boykin – tenor sax, percussion
- David Young – trumpet, flugelhorn, vocal on 4
- Jeff Parker – guitar
- Justin Dillard – piano on 4, 5 & 8
- Tomeka Reid – cello, shakere
- Josh Abrams – bass
- Marcus Evans – drums
- Ugochi Nwaogwugwu – vocals on 4, 7 & 9
