= Three Compositions =

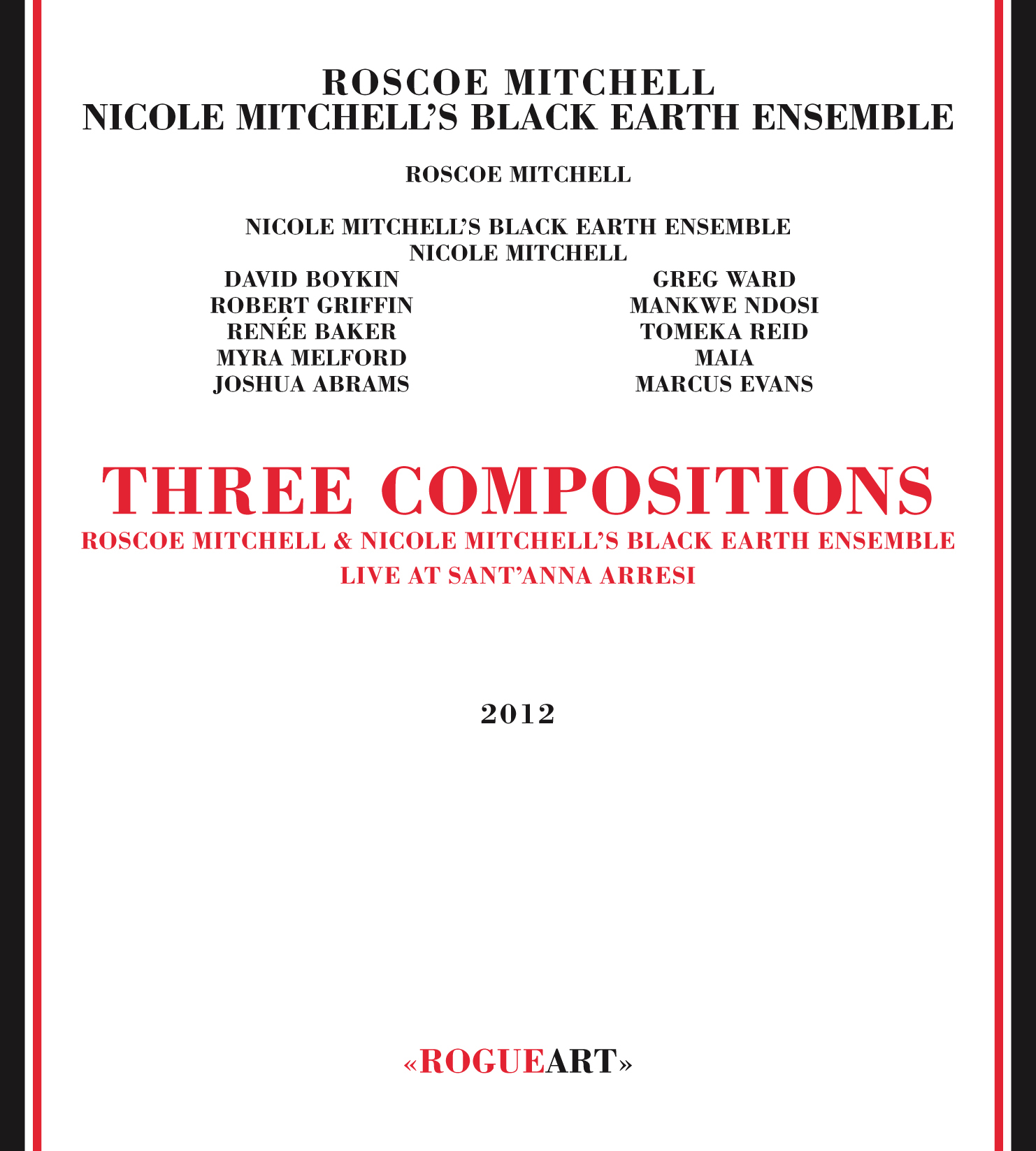

Live album by Roscoe Mitchell
- Released: 2012
- Recorded: August 30, 2009
- Venue: Piazza del Nuraghe, Sant'Anna Arresi, Italy
- Genre: Jazz
- Length: 59:21
- Label: RogueArt
- Producer: Michel Dorbon

Roscoe Mitchell chronology
Numbers (2011)	Three Compositions (2012)	Duets with Tyshawn Sorey and Special Guest Hugh Ragin (2013)

Three Compositions is an album by American jazz saxophonist Roscoe Mitchell which was recorded live at the occasion of Sant'Anna Arresi Jazz Festival 2009 and released on the French RogueArt label. Mitchell's scores are played by flautist Nicole Mitchell's Black Earth Ensemble.

== Music ==
"Quintet #1 for Eleven" and "Quintet #9 for Eleven" are transcriptions from Mitchell's Quintet series, both are performed by Mitchell's Quintet on Turn. The "Cards" piece, “Memoirs of a Dying Parachutist”, was originally a score for baritone voice and chamber orchestra with text by poet Daniel Moore.

== Reception ==
The All About Jazz review by John Sharpe says "Mitchell's subtle but richly detailed charts, often involving subsets of musicians, are brought vibrantly into focus by the Black Earth Ensemble, both collectively and as individuals."

The Point of Departure review by Brian Morton says "The miracle is that the music has tremendous bite and authority but with the open, questioning quality all of Mitchell’s work somehow has, as if his writing and playing were an interrogation of silence rather than an attempt to install an icon in a set place in the canon."

== Track listing ==
All compositions by Roscoe Mitchell

1. "Quintet #1 for Eleven" – 25:43
2. "Cards for Orchestra" – 14:15
3. "Quintet #9 for Eleven" – 19:21

== Personnel ==
- Roscoe Mitchell - composition, conduction
- Nicole Mitchell – flutes, piccolo
- David Boykin – tenor sax
- Greg Ward – alto sax
- Robert Griffin – trumpet
- Mankwe Ndosi – voice
- Renée Baker – violin
- Tomeka Reid – cello
- Myra Melford – piano
- Maia – harp
- Joshua Abrams – double bass
- Marcus Evans – drums
