= The Walter Bishop Jr. Trio / 1965 =

Compilation album by Walter Bishop Jr.
- Released: 1970
- Recorded: Spring 1962 and October 1963
- Studio: New York City
- Genre: Jazz
- Labels: Prestige; PR 7730
- Producer: Addison Amor

Walter Bishop Jr. chronology
Speak Low (1961)	The Walter Bishop Jr. Trio / 1965 (1970)	Bish Bash (1964–68)

A Pair of "Naturals" Cover

Summertime Cover

The Walter Bishop Jr. Trio / 1965 is an album by pianist Walter Bishop Jr. featuring sessions recorded in 1962 and 1963 which was released on the Prestige label in 1970. The album compiles tracks previously released on the albums A Pair of "Naturals" (Operators, 1962) and Summertime (Cotillion, 1963).

== Reception ==
Professional ratings
Review scores
Source	Rating
AllMusic	3/5 stars

The AllMusic reviewer Scott Yanow wrote: "Bishop plays a great deal of music in a short period of time. The performances are essentially classic bebop, although 11 of the 16 tunes (five by Bishop) can be considered obscurities. An underrated gem".

== Track listing ==
All compositions by Walter Bishop Jr. except as indicated

1. "Tell It the Way It Is" (Addison Amor, Walter Bishop Jr.) – 3:54
2. "I Thought About You" (Jimmy Van Heusen, Johnny Mercer) – 3:27
3. "Things Ain't What They Used to Be" (Mercer Ellington) – 2:37
4. "Falling in Love with Love" (Lorenz Hart, Richard Rodgers) – 3:36
5. "Dottie's Theme" (Addison Amor) – 2:40
6. "Dinkum" (De Louis Rey) – 2:37
7. "Take One of My Pills" – 2:35
8. "Theme on a Legend" – 2:36
9. "Getting off the Ground" – 2:00
10. "Summertime" (George Gershwin, DuBose Heyward) – 2:55
11. "Easy to Love" (Cole Porter) – 2:42
12. "33rd off 3rd" (Amor, Bishop) – 2:59
13. "Love for Sale" (Porter) – 2:45
14. "Our Romance Is Over" (Ruth Leventhal, William S. Lee) – 3:15
15. "The Bishop Moves" – 2:35
16. "Easy Walk" – 2:45
- Recorded in New York City in Spring 1962 (tracks 7, 8, 15 & 16) and in October 1963 (tracks 1–6 & 9–14)

== Personnel ==
- Walter Bishop Jr. – piano
- Butch Warren – bass
- G.T. Hogan (tracks 7, 8, 15 & 16), Jimmy Cobb (tracks 1–6 & 9–14) – drums
