= The Secret Escapades of Velvet Anderson =

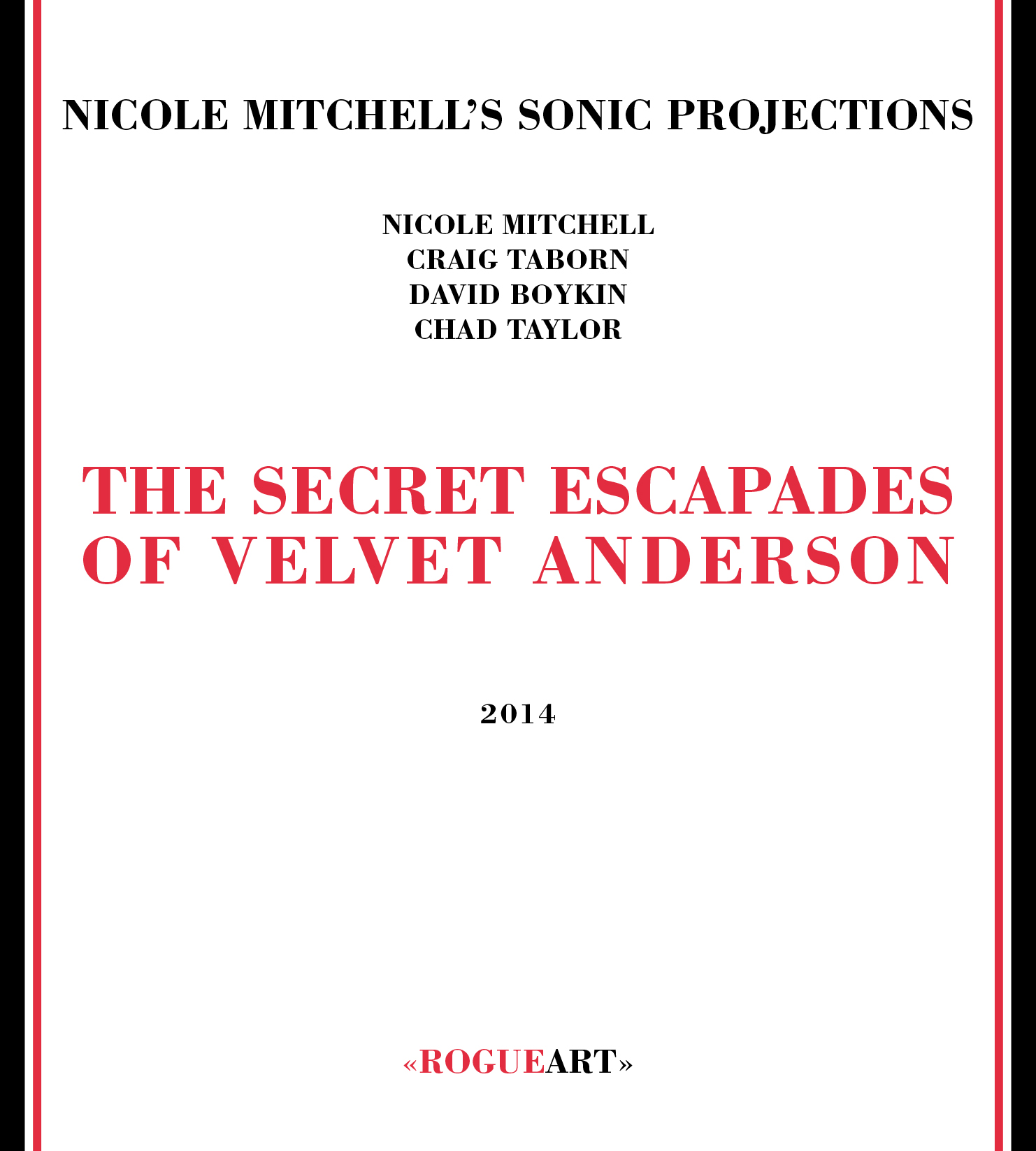

Studio album by Nicole Mitchell
- Released: 2014
- Recorded: January 11 & 13, 2013
- Studios: Shape Shop II, Hollywood
- Genre: Jazz
- Length: 69:53
- Label: RogueArt
- Producer: Michel Dorbon

Nicole Mitchell chronology
Intergalactic Beings (2014)	The Secret Escapades of Velvet Anderson (2014)	Artifacts (2015)

The Secret Escapades of Velvet Anderson is an album by American jazz flautist Nicole Mitchell, which was recorded in 2013 and released on the French RogueArt label. It was the second recording by Sonic Projections, a quartet featuring pianist Craig Taborn, saxophonist David Boykin and drummer Chad Taylor. The album title is a tribute to Chicago saxophonist Fred Anderson and his Velvet Lounge club.

== Reception ==
The All About Jazz review by John Sharpe states "As melodic passages rub shoulders with explosive rhythms and tricky unisons, Mitchell contrives a sequence of varied settings for the vibrant personalities in her cast. The CD launch concert proved the high point of the 2014 Vision Festival in NYC, and this disc measures well against that performance."

The Point of Departure review by Brian Morton says "The Secret Escapades of Velvet Anderson has a remarkable concentration of form and substance, revolving round identifiable cells and intervals, some of which, I suspect, may be intuitive rather than pre-planned or consciously written out."

== Track listing ==
All compositions by Nicole Mitchell

1. "Bright City" – 9:59
2. "Secret Assignment" – 11:16
3. "Discovery of the Jewel" – 2:24
4. "For the Cause" – 7:41
5. "Scaling the Underground" – 8:20
6. "Anderson's Plan" – 7:05
7. "Running the Rooftops" – 7:59
8. "The Labyrinth of Capture" – 7:18
9. "The Heroic Rescue" – 7:51

== Personnel ==
- Nicole Mitchell - flute
- Craig Taborn – piano, wurlitzer
- David Boykin – tenor sax
- Chad Taylor – drums, acoustic guitar
