= Xenogenesis Suite =

Studio album by Nicole Mitchell
- Released: 2008
- Recorded: June 20, 2007
- Studio: Firehouse 12, New Haven, CT
- Genre: Jazz
- Length: 50:42
- Label: Firehouse 12
- Producer: Nicole Mitchell

Nicole Mitchell chronology
Black Unstoppable (2007)	Xenogenesis Suite (2008)	Anaya (2009)

Xenogenesis Suite is an album by American jazz flautist Nicole Mitchell with her Black Earth Ensemble, which was recorded in 2007 and released on Firehouse 12. The work was commissioned by Chamber Music America and premiered at Vision Festival XII in New York City. It was her first suite based on the Xenogenesis novels of American science fiction writer Octavia Butler.

== Reception ==
Professional ratings
Review scores
Source	Rating
AllMusic	3.5/5 stars
Down Beat	3/5 stars

In his review for AllMusic, François Couture states "Moving, intricate, and immediate, this album marks a paradigm shift in her work as a composer, toward a much more personal voice."

The Down Beat review by Greg Burk notes "Though the intent is to prod rather than please, Mitchell’s dyspeptic horn harmonies possess a coarse beauty."

The All About Jazz review by Troy Collins says "A surprisingly effective combination of disturbing surrealism delivered with raw emotion and lyrical experimentation, Xenogenesis Suite is an endlessly rewarding listen."

The Penguin Jazz Guide observed "Mitchell has made a considerable splash with her Black Earth Ensemble, whose music is not so much a throwback to 40 years ago as a strong reminder of how much has moved forward in cultural politics. Some of the creative ethos is still the same though, and there is no mistaking the power in Mitchell's writing. ... The ensemble is tightly disciplined but still free to explore the dimensions of Mitchell's big ideas on their own individual terms".

== Track listing ==
All compositions by Nicole Mitchell

1. "Wonder" – 4:56
2. "Transition A" – 5:54
3. "Smell of Fear" – 5:36
4. "Sequence Shadows" – 4:42
5. "Oankali" – 4:22
6. "Adrenalin" – 5:43
7. "Transition C" – 5:49
8. "Before and After" – 6:39
9. "Down of a New Life" – 7:01

== Personnel ==
- Nicole Mitchell – flute
- David Boykin – tenor sax
- David Young – trumpet, flugelhorn
- Mankwe Ndosi – vocals
- Tomeka Reid – cello
- Justin Dillard – piano
- Josh Abrams – bass
- Marcus Evans – drums
- Arveeayl Ra – percussion
