= Improvisations (Roscoe Mitchell album) =

Live album by Roscoe Mitchell with Tony Marsh and John Edwards
- Released: September 2013
- Recorded: March 9, 2012
- Venue: Cafe Oto, London, England
- Genre: Jazz
- Length: 66:34
- Label: Otoroku; ROKU006

Roscoe Mitchell chronology
Duets with Tyshawn Sorey and Special Guest Hugh Ragin (2013)	Improvisations (2013)	Conversations I (2014)

Improvisation is a live album by American jazz saxophonist Roscoe Mitchell recorded in London at the Cafe Oto, with bassist John Edwards and drummer Tony Marsh which was recorded and released the venue's Otoroku label as a limited edition double LP and download.

== Reception ==
Professional ratings
Review scores
Source	Rating
All About Jazz	4/5 stars

In his review for All About Jazz, John Sharpe states, "once again Mitchell excels in generating subtle variations of timbre, tone and line ... Each of the four sidelong cuts follows a similar trajectory, from quiet atmospheric openings notable for their restraint to full blown expostulation by the saxophonist over an inventive bass and percussion latticework, leading to a gentle wind down. But in doing so the trio illustrate the broad range of expressive potential inherent in the format ... At 66-minutes the package forms an uncompromising but ultimately rewarding recital which stands proud in the American's recent discography"

== Track listing ==
All compositions by Roscoe Mitchell, John Edwards and Tony Marsh

1. "A" – 16:24
2. "B" – 16:11
3. "C" – 17:29
4. "D" – 16:30

== Personnel ==
- Roscoe Mitchell - soprano saxophone, alto saxophone, flute
- John Edwards – bass
- Tony Marsh – percussion
