= Cubicle (album) =

Studio album by Walter Bishop Jr.
- Released: 1978
- Recorded: June 21, 1978
- Studio: CI Recording, NYC
- Genre: Jazz
- Label: Muse; MR 5151
- Producer: Mitch Farber

Walter Bishop Jr. chronology
Hot House (1978)	Cubicle (1978)	Yesterdays (1987)

Cubicle is an album by pianist Walter Bishop Jr. which was recorded in 1978 and released on the Muse label in 1979.

== Reception ==
Professional ratings
Review scores
Source	Rating
AllMusic	4.5/5 stars

Ron Wynn of AllMusic stated "The fine bop pianist heads a large group of distinguished stars ... It's a different atmosphere for Bishop, usually featured in small combos or trios. The songs are nicely played, and there are several sparkling solos".

== Track listing ==
All compositions by Walter Bishop Jr. except where noted

1. "Valley Land" – 6:34
2. "My Little Suede Shoes" (Charlie Parker) – 4:50
3. "Those Who Chant" – 7:08
4. "Summertime" (George Gershwin, DuBose Heyward) – 8:06
5. "Now, Now That You've Left Me" (Mitch Farber) – 6:35
6. "Cubicle" – 4:12

== Personnel ==
- Walter Bishop Jr. – piano
- Randy Brecker – trumpet, flugelhorn
- Curtis Fuller – trombone
- Rene McLean – soprano saxophone, alto saxophone, tenor saxophone
- Pepper Adams – baritone saxophone
- Joe Caro – guitar
- Bob Cranshaw, Mark Egan (tracks 1 & 4) – Fender bass
- Billy Hart – drums
- Ray Mantilla – percussion
- Carmen Lundy – vocals (track 1)
- Mitch Farber – arranger
