= Calvin Keys =

American jazz guitarist (1942–2024)

- Born: February 6, 1942; Omaha, Nebraska, U.S.
- Died: April 14, 2024 (aged 82); Berkeley, California, U.S.
- Genres: Jazz, soul jazz
- Occupations: Musician, composer
- Instrument: Electric guitar
- Years active: 1969–2024
- Labels: Black Jazz, Wide Hive

Calvin Keys (February 6, 1942 – April 14, 2024) was an American jazz guitarist, known for the several albums he released for Black Jazz Records.

Keys performed and recorded with Ray Charles, Ahmad Jamal, Jimmy Smith, John Handy, Bobby Hutcherson, Eddie Marshall, Sonny Stitt, Pharoah Sanders, Joe Henderson and Leon Williams.

Keys died from a stroke in Berkeley, California, on April 14, 2024, at the age of 82.

== Discography ==
=== As leader ===
- Shawn-Neeq (Black Jazz, 1971)
- Proceed with Caution! (Black Jazz, 1974)
- Criss Cross (Ovation, 1976)
- Full Court Press (Olive Branch, 1985)
- Maria's First (Olive Branch, 1987)
- Standard Keys [live] (Lifeforce Jazz, 1992 [1997])
- Detours into Unconscious Rhythms (Wide Hive, 2000)
- Touch (Olive Branch, 2000) compilation
- An Evening With Calvin Keys [live] (Lifeforce Jazz, 2003) 2-CD
- Calvinesque (Silverado, 2005)
- Vertical Clearance (Wide Hive, 2006)
- Hand Made Portrait (Silverado, 2007)
- Electric Keys (Wide Hive, 2013)
- Close Enough For Love (Lifeforce Jazz, 2015)
- Simply Calvin (Lifeforce Jazz, 2022)
- Blue Keys (Wide Hive, 2022)

=== As sideman ===
With Ahmad Jamal

- Recorded Live at Oil Can Harry's (Catalyst, 1976)
- Steppin Out with a Dream (20th Century Fox, 1976)
- One (20th Century Fox, 1978)
- Night Song (Motown, 1980)
- Live in Paris 1996 (Birdology/Dreyfus, 1999)

With others

- Gene Russell, Talk to My Lady (Black Jazz, 1973)
- Billy Brooks, Windows of the Mind (Crossover, 1974)
- Doug Carn, Adam's Apple (Black Jazz, 1974)
- Doug Carn, Higher Ground (Ovation, 1976)
- Gene Russell, Listen Here (Ovation, 1976)
- James Newton Howard, Dying Young (Arista, 1991)
- Denise Perrier, I Wanna Be Loved (Chezz Perrier, 1996)
- Dissent, Dissent (Wide Hive, 1999)
- Azeem, Mayhem Mystics (Wide Hive, 2004)
