= Intergalactic Beings =

Live album by Nicole Mitchell
- Released: 2014
- Recorded: April 30, 2010
- Venue: Museum of Contemporary Art, Chicago
- Genre: Jazz
- Length: 60:12
- Label: FPE

Nicole Mitchell chronology
Engraved in the Wind (2013)	Intergalactic Beings (2014)	The Secret Escapades of Velvet Anderson (2014)

Intergalactic Beings is an album by American jazz flautist Nicole Mitchell with her Black Earth Ensemble, which was recorded in 2010 and released on FPE. The work was commissioned by the Chicago's Museum of Contemporary Art and the album is the result of the live performance. It was her second suite based on the Xenogenesis novels of American science fiction writer Octavia Butler.

== Reception ==
Professional ratings
Review scores
Source	Rating
Down Beat	3/5 stars

The Down Beat review by Bill Meyer says "this suite encompasses contemporary chamber music, ritualistic vocal incantations and harrowingly violent expressions of agitation. Strings clash, and woodwinds carve out eerie melodies against backdrops that shift mercurially from emptiness to elastic grooves to looming orchestral chasms."

In a review for JazzTimes Shaun Brady states "Her bold contribution to the art of Afrofuturism connects the all-embracing avant-gardism of the AACM, the cosmic chaos of the Sun Ra Arkestra and the nebulous sonic experimentation of Rob Mazurek’s Exploding Star Orchestra, of which Mitchell is a member."

The All About Jazz review by John Sharpe notes that "Interlocking riffs, tricky unisons and ostinatos organically develop into ambient improv type structures in a largely continuous program in which atmospheric episodes alternate with more driving solo laden passages."

== Track listing ==
All compositions by Nicole Mitchell

1. "Phases of Subduction" – 10:20
2. "Cycle of Metamorphosis" – 5:26
3. "The Ooli Moves" – 8:06
4. "Dripping Matter" – 3:58
5. "Negotiating Identity" – 7:42
6. "Web of Hope" – 2:49
7. "Fields of Possibility" – 5:50
8. "Resisting Entanglement" – 6:16
9. "The Inevitable" – 9:45

== Personnel ==
- Nicole Mitchell – flute
- Mankwe Ndosi – vocals
- David Boykin – tenor sax, bass clarinet
- David Young – trumpet, sralai
- Renée Baker – violin
- Tomeka Reid – cello
- Jeff Parker – guitar
- Josh Abrams – bass
- Arveeayl Ra – percussion
- Marcus Evans – drums
