= In Pursuit of Magic =

Live album by Roscoe Mitchell and Mike Reed
- Released: January 28, 2014
- Recorded: April 19, 2013
- Venue: Constellation, Chicago, IL
- Genre: Jazz
- Length: 46:02
- Label: 482 Music; 482-1088

Roscoe Mitchell chronology
Conversations II (2014)	In Pursuit of Magic (2014)	Angel City (2014)

In Pursuit of Magic is a live album by American jazz saxophonist Roscoe Mitchell with drummer Mike Reed which was recorded in 2013 and released on 482 Music.

== Reception ==
In his review for the Chicago Reader, Bill Meyer states, "Mitchell shifts adroitly between several saxophones and flutes, using Reed’s surging tempos, sensitive brushwork, and varying density of attack as a launching pad and backdrop for extraordinarily long, convoluted linear forays full of tension and surprise"

== Track listing ==
All compositions by Roscoe Mitchell and Mike Reed

1. "Constellations Over Denmark" – 21:03
2. "Light Can Bend" – 24:59

== Personnel ==
- Roscoe Mitchell - saxophone, flute
- Mike Reed – drums, percussion
