= Keeper of My Soul =

Studio album by Walter Bishop Jr.'s 4th Cycle
- Released: 1973
- Recorded: 1973
- Studio: Hollywood Spectrum, Los Angeles, CA
- Genre: Jazz
- Length: 38:08
- Label: Black Jazz BJQD/14
- Producer: Gene Russell

Walter Bishop Jr. chronology
Coral Keys (1971)	Keeper of My Soul (1973)	Valley Land (1974)

Keeper of My Soul is an album led by pianist Walter Bishop Jr. which was recorded in 1973 and originally released on the Black Jazz label.

Professional ratings
Review scores
Source	Rating
AllMusic	4.5/5 stars

== Track listing ==
All compositions by Walter Bishop Jr. except where noted.

1. "Soul Village" – 6:25
2. "N'dugu's Prayer" – 4:38
3. "Summertime" (George Gershwin, Ira Gershwin) – 5:49
4. "Those Who Chant" – 7:48
5. "Keeper of My Soul" – 4:49
6. "Blue Bossa" (Kenny Dorham) – 3:14
7. "Sweet Rosa" – 5:25

== Personnel ==
- Walter Bishop Jr. – piano, electric piano, Hammond organ
- Ronnie Laws – flute, saxophone
- Woody Murray – vibraphone
- Gerald Brown – bass, electric bass
- Bahir Hassan – drums
- Shakur M. Abdulla – congas, bongos
