= Hot House (Walter Bishop Jr. album) =

Studio album by Walter Bishop Jr.
- Released: 1979
- Recorded: December 14, 1977, and March 14, 1978
- Studios: CI, NYC
- Genre: Jazz
- Labels: Muse; MR 5183
- Producer: Fred Seibert

Walter Bishop Jr. chronology
Soul Village (1977)	Hot House (1979)	Cubicle (1978)

Hot House is an album by pianist Walter Bishop Jr., recorded in 1977 and 1978 and released on the Muse label in 1979.

== Critical reception ==
Professional ratings
Review scores
Source	Rating
AllMusic	3/5 stars

The Globe and Mail wrote that the "[bop classics] are done up in fine spirit, but the standards reveal a little more depth in Bishop's fleet, lightly percussive style."

David Szatmary of AllMusic stated: "Excellent bebop session by this pianist".

== Track listing ==
1. "Dahoud" (Clifford Brown) – 4:17
2. "Medley: Sophisticated Lady/A Time for Love" (Duke Ellington/Brian Potter, Dennis Lambert) – 6:51
3. "Hot House" (Charlie Parker) – 4:50
4. "Move" (Denzil Best, Paul Welsh) – 5:15
5. "My Little Suede Shoes" (Parker) – 4:41
6. "Wave" (Antônio Carlos Jobim) – 4:20
7. "All God's Children" (Traditional) – 2:32

== Personnel ==
- Walter Bishop Jr. – piano
- Bill Hardman – trumpet (tracks 1 & 3–5)
- Junior Cook – tenor saxophone (tracks 1 & 3–5)
- Sam Jones – bass
- Al Foster – drums
