= Numbers (Roscoe Mitchell album) =

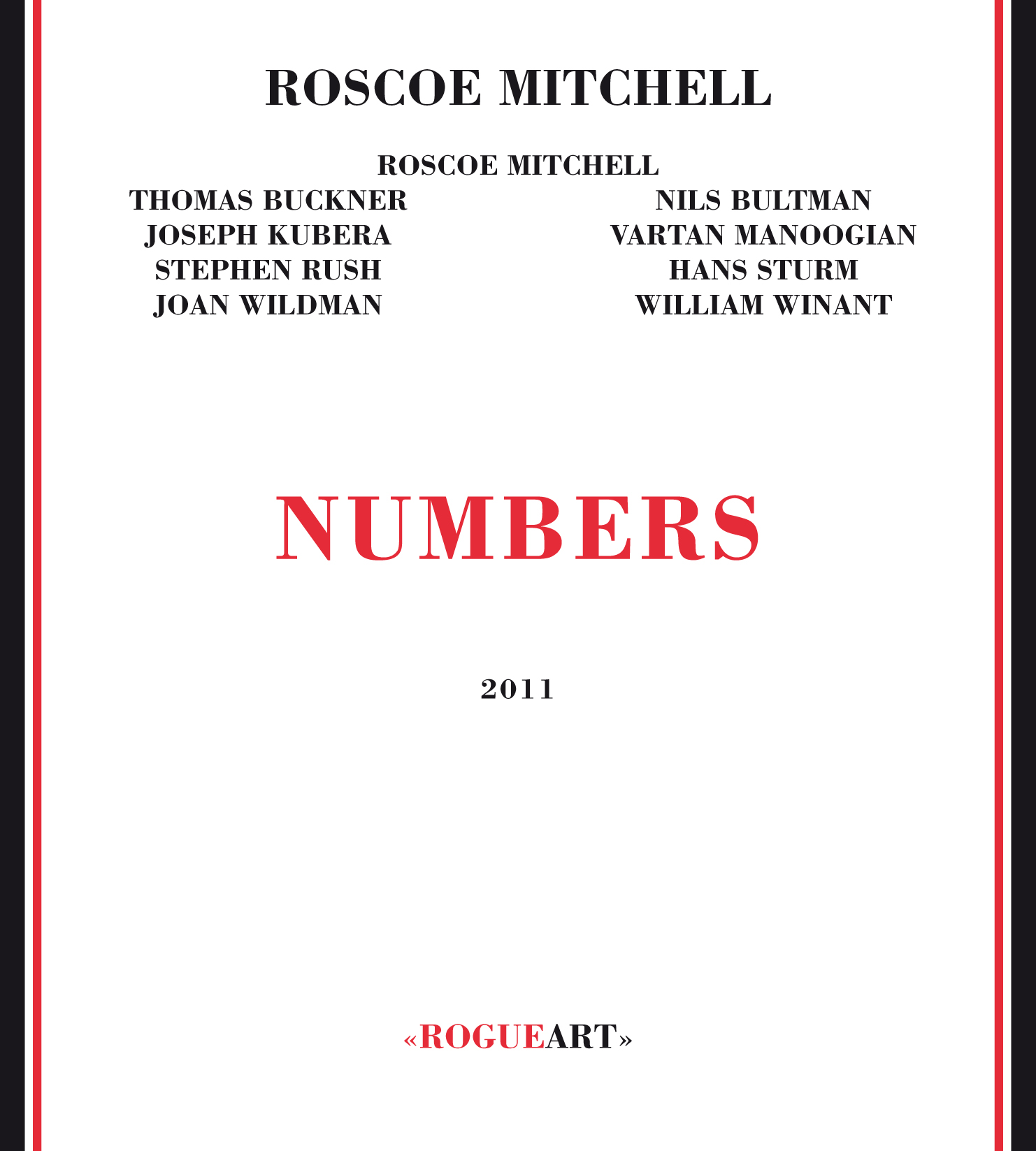

Studio album / Live album by Roscoe Mitchell
- Released: 2011
- Recorded: August 16, 2002, February 13, 2003, January 10, 2010, February 10, 2010, March 27, 2010 and August 8, 2010,
- Venue: Mills College, Oakland, CA
- Studio: Systems Two, Brooklyn, NY, Audio for the Arts, Madison, WI and Duderstadt Center Audio Studio, University of Michigan, Ann Arbor, MI
- Genre: Jazz
- Length: 65:05
- Label: RogueArt; ROG-0036
- Producer: Michel Dorbon

Roscoe Mitchell chronology
Far Side (2007)	Numbers (2011)	Three Compositions (2012)

Numbers is an album by American jazz saxophonist Roscoe Mitchell, which was recorded in between 2003 and 2010 and released on the French RogueArt label.

== Reception ==
Professional ratings
Review scores
Source	Rating
All About Jazz	3/5 stars
DownBeat	3.5/5 stars

All About Jazz', John Sharpe said "Mitchell himself, playing alto saxophone, appears on just one out of 13 tracks, recorded in multiple sessions over an eight year period from 2002. Even though... little of the content would seem out of place individually in any Mitchell set list, the act of bringing these pieces together does make for a different experience. There is no indication as to whether the works are entirely through-composed or allow extemporization into their realization, but in spite of their abstraction, the consistent purity of tone and precision of delivery places them firmly in the contemporary new music camp."

In a review for DownBeat, Alain Drouot wrote: "Numbers should not be viewed as a new chamber work for the reason that most of the musicians performing these solo and duo pieces... come from a particular musical sphere. They have also tested the improvised music and jazz waters... this collection of works can appear fairly academic. Still, their relative classicism should not overshadow the pure pleasure they provide."

Marc Medwin, writing for Dusted Magazine, commented: "The performances could not be more committed. Each brims with vigor and is flawlessly executed."

== Track listing ==
All compositions by Roscoe Mitchell except where noted

1. "Bells for New Orleans (Prelude)" – 1:33
2. "9/9/99" – 10:33
3. "Sketches" – 6:36
4. "Because It's" (Mitchell, e.e. cummings) – 2:14
5. "This" (Mitchell, cummings) – 4:30
6. "Dim" (Mitchell, cummings) – 5:47
7. "Bells for New Orleans" – 5:01
8. "WR/C 2A Opus I" – 9:49
9. "8/8/88 1st Movement" – 4:24
10. "8/8/88 2nd Movement" – 1:50
11. "8/8/88 3rd Movement" – 3:33
12. "9/9/09" – 7:09
13. "Bells for New Orleans (Postlude)" – 2:11
- Recorded on February 13, 2003, at Systems Two, Brooklyn, NY (tracks 2, 4, 5 & 6) August 16, 2002 at Audio for the Arts, Madison, WI (track 3), February 10, 2010 at the Audio Studio, Duderstadt Center, University of Michigan, Ann Arbor, MI (tracks 9, 10 & 11), January 10, 2010 (track 8), March 27, 2010 (tracks 1, 7 & 13) and August 8, 2010 (track 12) at Mills College, Oakland, CA

== Personnel ==
- Roscoe Mitchell – compositions, alto saxophone (track 8)
- Thomas Buckner – baritone (tracks 4–6)
- Joseph Kubera (tracks 2 & 4–6), Stephen Rush (tracks 9–11), Joan Wildman (track 3) – piano
- Nils Bultman – viola (track 12)
- Varten Manoogian – violin (track 2)
- Hans Sturm – double bass (track 3)
- William Winant – tubular bells, orchestra bells, vibraphone (tracks 1, 7, 8 & 13)
