= Afrika Rising =

Studio album / Live album by Nicole Mitchell
- Released: 2002
- Recorded: (1–4) January 13, 2002 (10) March 31, 2002 (5) November 9, 1999 (6–9) June 4, 2002 (11) April 20, 2002
- Studio: (1–4) HotHouse, Chicago (10) Truckstop Studios, Chicago (5) Chicago Cultural Center (6–9) Southport Studios, Chicago (11) Velvet Lounge, Chicago
- Genre: Jazz
- Length: 59:29
- Label: Dreamtime
- Producer: Nicole Mitchell

Nicole Mitchell chronology
Vision Quest (2001)	Afrika Rising (2002)	Hope, Future and Destiny (2004)

Afrika Rising is an album by jazz flautist Nicole Mitchell with her group Black Earth Ensemble. It was released in 2002 by Dreamtime, Mitchell's own label.

== Reception ==
The Exclaim! review by David Dacks says "Afrika Rising builds on Mitchell's successful debut, Vision Quest, a year ago and is forward-thinking jazz that swings like crazy." JazzTimes wrote: "The music is deeply informed by African rhythm and counterpoint as well as by big-band jazz of both the classic and eccentric (à la Sun Ra) varieties. Mitchell uses many voices masterfully, none more so than her own".

== Track listing ==
All compositions by Nicole Mitchell except where noted.

1. "Afrika Rising Mvmt I: The Ancient Power Awakens" – 8:34
2. "Afrika Rising Mvmt II: Metemorphosis" – 7:33
3. "Afrika Rising Mvmt III: Intergalactic Healing" – 5:39
4. "Peaceful Village Town" – 5:17
5. "Emerging Light" – 0:53
6. "Umoja (intro)" – 1:01
7. "Umoja" – 5:42
8. "Bluerise" – 10:49
9. "Goldmind" (melody from "Wade in the Water", traditional) – 2:07
10. "Wheatgrass" – 7:57
11. "Toward Vision Quest" – 3:21

== Personnel ==
- Nicole Mitchell – flute, piccolo, vocals
- David Boykin – saxophone, clarinet, vocals
- Tony Herrera – trombone, shells, vocals
- Steve Berry – trombone
- Savoir Faire – violin, vocals
- Edith Yokley – violin
- Tomeka Reid – cello
- Miles Tate III – piano
- Jim Baker – piano
- Wanda Bishop – piano, vocals
- Darius Savage – double bass
- Josh Abrams – bass, vocals
- Hamid Drake – drums
- Isaiah Spencer – drums
- Arveeayl Ra – drums, vocals
- Jovia Armstrong – percussion
- Coco Elysses – percussion
