= Speak Low (Walter Bishop Jr. album) =

Studio album by Walter Bishop Jr.
- Released: 1961
- Recorded: March 14, 1961
- Studio: Bell Sound (New York City)
- Genre: Jazz
- Length: 61:33
- Label: Jazztime JT 002; Muse MR 5066; Black Lion BLCD760109
- Producer: Fred Norsworthy

Walter Bishop Jr. chronology
Speak Low (1961)	The Walter Bishop Jr. Trio / 1965 (1962–63)

Milestones Cover

Speak Low is the debut album led by pianist Walter Bishop Jr. which was recorded at Bell Sound Studios in 1961 and originally released on the Jazztime label. It was re-released in 1975 on the Muse label under the original title then reissued on CD in 1989 as Milestones on the Black Lion label with 3 alternate takes in 1989.

== Reception ==
Professional ratings
Review scores
Source	Rating
AllMusic	4/5 stars

Eugene Chadbourne of AllMusic stated "this is not a flashy keyboardist and also one who did not choose his debut as a leader to unveil a stack of up til then hidden original masterpieces of composition. He plays standards here, choosing either the long or short form for six different titles, some of them quite familiar".

== Track listing ==
1. "Sometimes I'm Happy" [Take 1] (Vincent Youmans, Irving Caesar) – 7:30 Bonus track on CD reissue
2. "Sometimes I'm Happy" [Take 2] (Youmans, Caesar) – 6:34
3. "Blues in the Closet" [Take 3] (Oscar Pettiford) – 3:53 Bonus track on CD reissue
4. "Blues in the Closet [Take 5] (Pettiford) – 4:04
5. "On Green Dolphin Street" (Bronisław Kaper, Ned Washington) – 9:47
6. "Alone Together" (Arthur Schwartz, Howard Dietz) – 6:49
7. "Milestones" (Miles Davis) – 4:49
8. "Speak Low" [Take 5] (Kurt Weill, Ogden Nash) – 9:32 Bonus track on CD reissue
9. "Speak Low" [Take 6] (Weill, Nash) – 9:23

== Personnel ==
- Walter Bishop Jr. – piano
- Jimmy Garrison – bass
- G.T. Hogan – drums
