= Bish Bash =

Studio album by Walter Bishop Jr.
- Released: 1975
- Recorded: August 2, 1964 and May 15, 1968
- Genre: Jazz
- Label: Xanadu; 114
- Producer: Don Schlitten

Walter Bishop Jr. chronology
The Walter Bishop Jr. Trio / 1965 (1965)	Bish Bash (1975)	Coral Keys (1972)

Bish Bash is an album by pianist Walter Bishop Jr. that was recorded in 1964 and 1968 and released on the Xanadu label.

== Reception ==
Professional ratings
Review scores
Source	Rating
Allmusic	4/5 stars

The Allmusic review by Scott Yanow recommended the album awarding it 4 stars and stating: "the two obscure sessions on this Xanadu set were pianist Walter Bishop Jr.'s only dates as a leader during the 1964-70 period... Throughout, Walter Bishop Jr. plays at his most creative, extending the bebop tradition during the enjoyable performances".

== Track listing ==
All compositions by Walter Bishop Jr. except where noted.

1. "Days of Wine and Roses" (Henry Mancini, Johnny Mercer) – 13:43
2. "Willow Weep for Me" (Ann Ronell) – 14:23
3. "Summertime" (George Gershwin, DuBose Heyward) – 3:36
4. "Minor Motive" – 3:36
5. "Yesterday's Dream" – 5:18
6. "Party Time" – 2:00
7. "My Man's Gone Now" (Gershwin, Heyward) – 4:03
8. "Viva" – 2:57

== Personnel ==
- Walter Bishop Jr. – piano
- Frank Haynes – tenor saxophone (track 1 & 2)
- Eddie Khan (tracks 1–3), Reggie Johnson (tracks 4–8) – bass
- Dick Berk (tracks 1–3), Idris Muhammad (tracks 4–8) – drums
