= Arc of O =

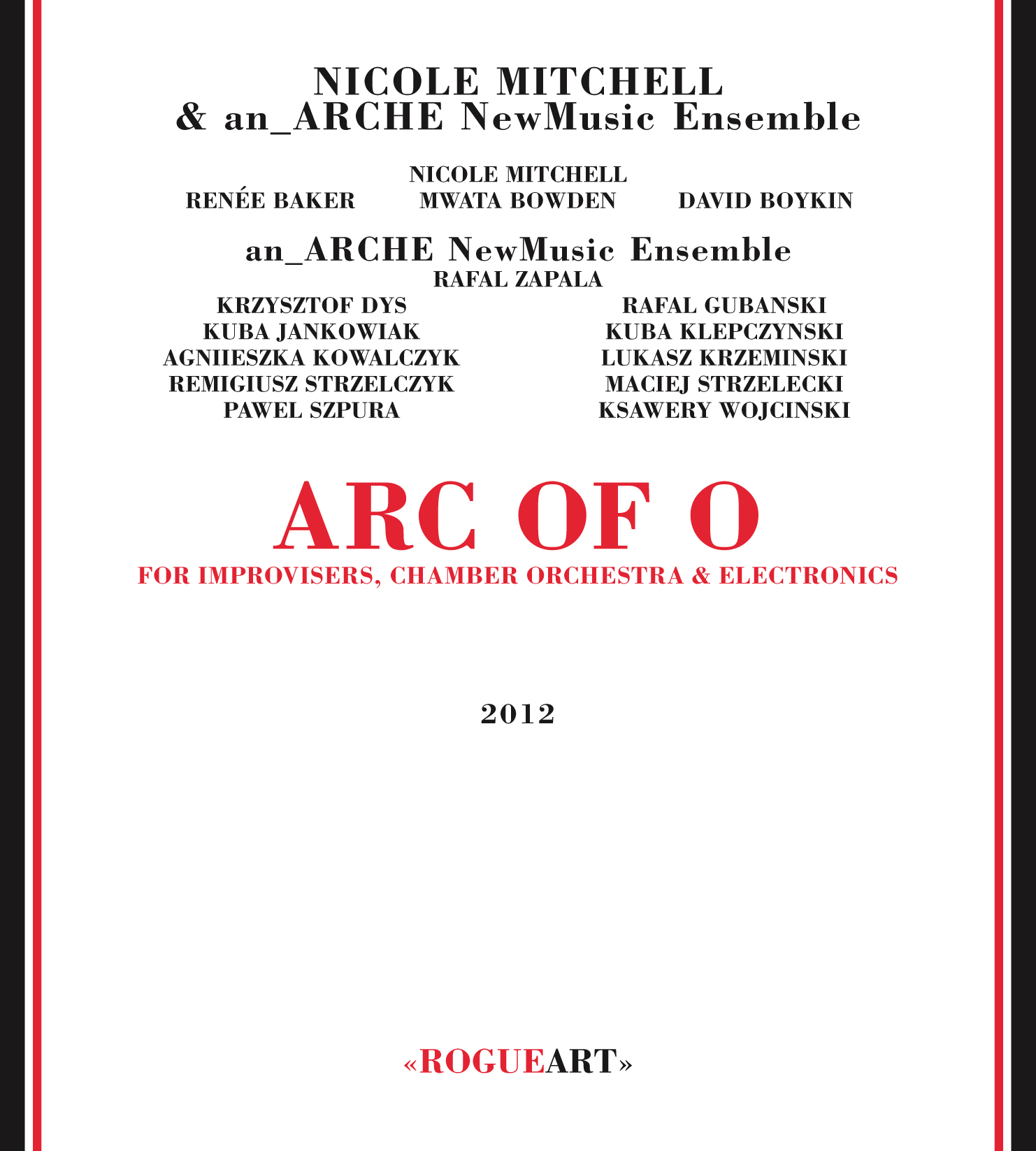

Live album by Nicole Mitchell
- Released: 2012
- Recorded: December 2, 2010
- Venue: Poznań
- Genre: Jazz
- Length: 58:28
- Label: RogueArt
- Producer: Michel Dorbon

Nicole Mitchell chronology
Awakening (2011)	Arc of O (2012)	Aquarius (2013)

Arc of O (subtitled For Improvisers, Chamber Orchestra and Electronics) is an album by American jazz flautist Nicole Mitchell & an_Arche New Music Ensemble, a Polish chamber group co-founded and directed by Rafal Zapala and Filip Walcerz. It was recorded live as part of the Made in Chicago Festival of Poznań in 2010 and released on the French RogueArt label.

== Reception ==
Professional ratings
Review scores
Source	Rating
Down Beat	4.5/5 stars

The Down Beat review by Michael Jackson says "One of Mitchell's assets, one might clain the mark of genius, is her ability to command and maintain, through composition, conduction and her own liquid flutework, fresh grooves one minute, complete abstraction the next."

The All About Jazz review by John Sharpe notes that "In the liners, the flutist explains that Arc of O has been a turning point, leading to further commissions bridging the jazz and contemporary worlds. If they are all as stimulating as this outing then perhaps they will generate their own terminology."

== Track listing ==
All compositions by Nicole Mitchell

1. "Arc of O" – 43:14
2. "Afrika Rising" – 15:11

== Personnel ==
- Nicole Mitchell – flute, vocals, electronic samples, conduction
- Renée Baker – violin
- Mwata Bowden – baritone sax, bass clarinet, clarinet
- David Boykin – tenor sax
- Rafal Zapala – electronics, percussion
- Krzysztof Dys – piano
- Kuba Jankowiak – trumpet
- Agnieszka Kowalczyk – cello
- Remigiuzz Strelczyk – viola
- Pawel Szpura – drums
- Rafal Gubanski – clarinet
- Kuba Klepczynski – trombone
- Lukasz Krzeminski – oboe
- Maciej Strzelecki – violin
- Kaswery Wojcinski – bass
