= Angel City (album) =

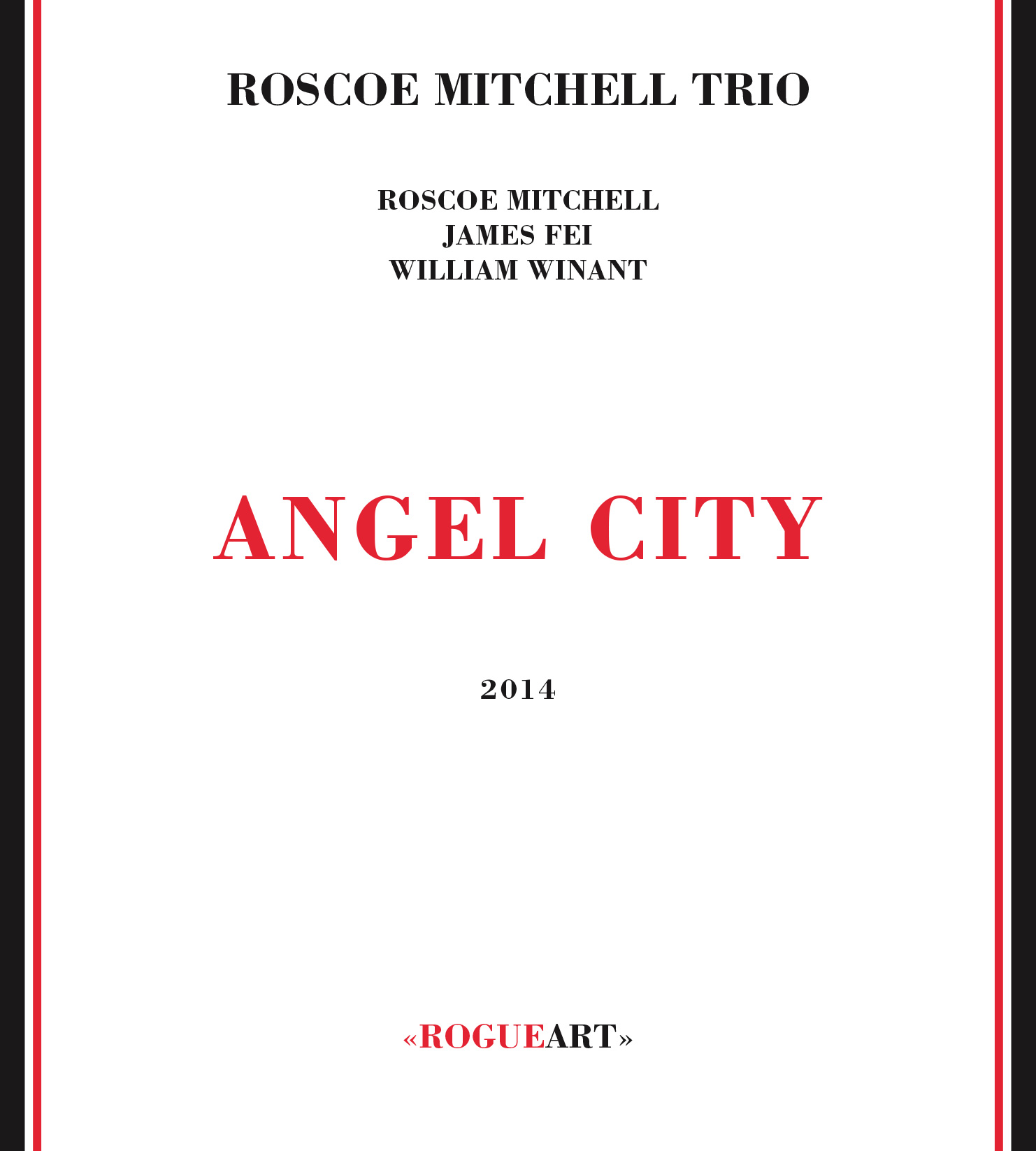

Studio album by Roscoe Mitchell
- Released: 2014
- Recorded: November 23 & 24, 2012
- Studio: Jeannik Méquet Littlefield Concert Hall, Mills College, Oakland, California
- Genre: Jazz
- Length: 55:12
- Label: RogueArt
- Producer: Michel Dorbon

Roscoe Mitchell chronology
In Pursuit of Magic (2014)	Angel City (2014)	Celebrating Fred Anderson (2015)

Angel City is an album by American jazz saxophonist Roscoe Mitchell which was recorded in 2012 and released on the French RogueArt label. Mitchell wrote the piece for the 2011 Angel City Jazz Festival in Los Angeles.

== Reception ==
The All About Jazz review by John Sharpe states "For those who make the effort Mitchell creates a raft of strange and mesmerizing soundscapes, but the journey may be too daunting for the casual listener."

The Point of Departure review by Michael Rosenstein says "In lesser hands, this could easily devolve into episodic dalliance. But, the three maintain a collective focus throughout."

== Track listing ==
Composition by Roscoe Mitchell

1. "Angel City" – 55:12

== Personnel ==
- Roscoe Mitchell – sopranino saxophone, bass saxophone, baroque flute, bass recorder, whistles, percussion
- James Fei – sopranino saxophone, alto saxophone, baritone saxophone, bb bass clarinet, bb contrabass clarinet, analog electronics
- William Winant – orchestra bells, tubular bells, marimba, timpani, bass drum, snare drum, cymbals, cow bells, triangles, woodblocks, gongs, percussion
