= Valley Land =

Studio album by Walter Bishop Jr.
- Released: 1976
- Recorded: December 30, 1974
- Genre: Jazz
- Label: Muse; MR 5060
- Producer: Fred Norsworthy

Walter Bishop Jr. chronology
Keeper of My Soul (1973)	Valley Land (1976)	Soliloquy (1976)

Valley Land is an album led by pianist Walter Bishop Jr. which was recorded in 1974 and released on the Muse label.

== Reception ==
Professional ratings
Review scores
Source	Rating
AllMusic	3/5 stars

Ron Wynn of AllMusic stated "Bishop demonstrates his proficiency with rapid-fire bop tunes and standards, playing superbly throughout this trio date".

== Track listing ==
All compositions by Walter Bishop Jr. except where noted.

1. "Invitation" (Bronisław Kaper, Paul Francis Webster) — 8:34
2. "Lush Life" (Billy Strayhorn) — 3:48
3. "Sam's Blues" — 5:40
4. "You Stepped Out of a Dream" (Nacio Herb Brown, Gus Kahn) — 4:12
5. "Valley Land" — 5:40
6. "Killer Joe" (Benny Golson) — 4:51
7. "Make Someone Happy" (Jule Styne, Betty Comden, Adolph Green) — 4:27

== Personnel ==
- Walter Bishop Jr. — piano
- Sam Jones — bass
- Billy Hart — drums
