= Vital Blue =

Studio album by Blue Mitchell
- Released: 1971
- Recorded: June 26–27, 1971
- Genre: Jazz
- Length: 28:39
- Label: Mainstream
- Producer: Bob Shad

Blue Mitchell chronology
Blue Mitchell (1971)	Vital Blue (1971)	Blues' Blues (1972)

Vital Blue is an album by American trumpeter Blue Mitchell recorded in 1971 and released on the Mainstream label.

== Reception ==
The Allmusic review awarded the album 3 stars.

Professional ratings
Review scores
Source	Rating
Allmusic	3/5 stars

== Track listing ==
All compositions by Blue Mitchell except as indicated

1. "Booty Shakin'" (Ernie Wilkins) – 5:20
2. "Vital Blue" (Wilkins) – 5:17
3. "Unseen Sounds" (Jimmy Bond) – 3:24
4. "Herman's Helmet" (Jack Wilson) – 6:57
5. "I Love You" (Cole Porter) – 5:09
6. "For All We Know" (J. Fred Coots, Sam M. Lewis) – 2:32

- Recorded in New York City on June 26 & 27, 1971.

== Personnel ==
- Blue Mitchell – trumpet
- Joe Henderson – flute, tenor saxophone
- Ernie Watts – tenor saxophone
- Walter Bishop, Jr. – piano
- Stanley Gilbert – bass
- Doug Sides – drums
- Susaye Greene – vocals (3, 5–6)
