= Awakening (Nicole Mitchell album) =

Studio album by Nicole Mitchell
- Released: 2011
- Recorded: March 2 & 3, 2011
- Studios: Riverside Studios, Chicago
- Genre: Jazz
- Length: 63:49
- Label: Delmark
- Producers: Nicole Miller, Steve Wagner

Nicole Mitchell chronology
The Ethiopian Princess Meets The Tantric Priest (2011)	Awakening (2011)	Arc of O (2012)

Awakening is an album by American jazz flautist Nicole Mitchell, which was recorded in 2011 and released on Delmark. She leads a quartet with guitarist Jeff Parker, bassist Harrison Bankhead and drummer Avreeayl Ra. Although she's worked extensively with these musicians, the group played together for the first time just days before heading into the studio. Mitchell explained "With this quartet I tried to put the flute more out front as usual. I wanted to dig back into the old school jazz a bit and yet still make room to branch out into never-never land".

== Reception ==
Professional ratings
Review scores
Source	Rating
AllMusic	4/5 stars
Down Beat	3.5/5 stars

In his review for AllMusic, Alex Henderson states "Mitchell, it should be noted, has favored different combinations of musicians on different albums; she is quite proficient when it comes to ensemble playing and arranging, but an intimate quartet format serves her equally well on Awakening."

The Down Beat review by Josef Woodard says "On nine tracks, mostly penned by Mitchell, and moving rhythmic vigor, tender asides and abstract passages, the flutist demonstrates her musicality. She also embodies a generosity of spirit and pan-historic/jazz tradition tendencies with her connections to the Association for the Advancement of Creative Musicians."

The All About Jazz review by Jack Huntley notes that "the band is as tight and unified in the experimental modes as they are in the more traditional aspects of the songs. This balancing act results in music both exciting and approachable, and makes Awakening a vibrant musical statement."

In a review for JazzTimes Lloyd Sachs states "As good as her broadly thematic long-form works with her larger Black Earth Ensemble are, they tend to hem in Mitchell the soloist. Here, floating freely in space, she gets to show off her full-toned intensity in all its shapes and textures, making sharp but sparing use of dark trills, slurred long notes and vocal effects."

The Point of Departure review by Troy Collins says "Following in the footsteps of iconoclasts like Robert Dick and James Newton, Mitchell expands upon the expressive technical innovations of Rahsaan Roland Kirk with peerless originality. More than any of her previous endeavors, Awakening focuses on Mitchell’s virtuosic interpretive abilities, rightfully earning her the acclaim she has received."

== Track listing ==
All compositions by Nicole Mitchell except as indicated

1. "Curly Top" – 6:58
2. "Journey on a Thread" – 9:04
3. "Center of the Earth" – 7:04
4. "Snowflakes" – 2:24
5. "Momentum" – 11:37
6. "More Than I Can Say" – 8:55
7. "There" – 6:21
8. "F.O.C." (Jeff Parker) – 6:03
9. "Awakening" – 5:23

== Personnel ==
- Nicole Mitchell - flute
- Jeff Parker – guitar
- Harrison Bankhead – bass
- Avreeayl Ra – drums, percussion
