= Emerald Hills (album) =

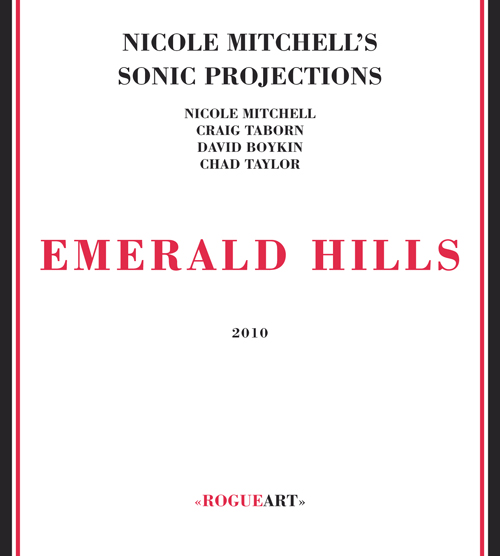

Studio album by Nicole Mitchell
- Released: 2010
- Recorded: May 4 & 5, 2009
- Studio: Soma Electronic Music, Chicago
- Genre: Jazz
- Length: 71:56
- Label: RogueArt
- Producer: Michel Dorbon

Nicole Mitchell chronology
Renegades (2009)	Emerald Hills (2010)	Before After (2011)

Emerald Hills is an album by American jazz flautist Nicole Mitchell, which was recorded in 2009 and released on the French RogueArt label. It was the debut recording by Sonic Projections, a quartet featuring pianist Craig Taborn, saxophonist David Boykin and drummer Chad Taylor. The band (originally with saxophonist Matana Roberts instead of Boykin) was formed in 2008 to celebrate the publication of George Lewis's book A Power Stronger Than Itself: The AACM and American Experimental Music.

== Reception ==
The All About Jazz review by John Sharpe states "In some ways Chicago-based flautist Nicole Mitchell's Emerald Hills resembles an old style AACM record: there's an adventurous spirit, a diversity of approaches, and chops to burn."

The Point of Departure review by Ed Hazell says "They make busy, dancing music, full of graceful interplay over elusive rhythmic pulses. The music is eventful, but it never feels overcrowded. Mitchell is so intent on communicating with her listeners that her music is always clear, uncluttered, and direct."

== Track listing ==
All compositions by Nicole Mitchell except as indicated

1. "Visitations" – 9:05
2. "Ritual and Rebellion" – 11:48
3. "Chocolate Chips" – 6:43
4. "Wild Life" (Nicole Mitchell – David Boykin) – 3:59
5. "Wishes" – 5:15
6. "Emerald Hills" – 11:28
7. "Surface of Syrius" (David Boykin – Craig Taborn) – 2:10
8. "Affirmations" – 14:57
9. "Peace" – 5:56

== Personnel ==
- Nicole Mitchell – flute, alto flute, piccolo, vocals
- Craig Taborn – piano
- David Boykin – tenor sax
- Chad Taylor – drums, percussion
