= 3 Chairs =

American musical group

- Origin: Detroit, Michigan
- Genres: Deep house
- Years active: 1997–present
- Labels: 3 Chairs, Mahogani
- Members: Moodymann; Theo Parrish; Rick Wilhite; Marcellus Pittman
- Website: 3chairsdetroit.bandcamp.com/album/3-chairs-collection-1997-2013

3 Chairs is a musical supergroup consisting of Detroit house music producers Kenny "Moodymann" Dixon Jr., Theo Parrish, Rick Wilhite, and Marcellus Pittman. The group began as a trio in 1997 before the addition of Pittman in 2003.

== History ==
The group formed as the trio of Dixon, Parrish, and Wilhite in the late 1990s, when they released a series of 12-inch records. With 2003's All Over EP, they added Pittman to the lineup. They released a self-titled album in 2004 which featured appearances by Detroit artists such as saxophonist Norma Jean Bell, percussionist Andrés, keyboardist Amp Fiddler, bassist Bubz Fiddler, and Urban Tribe's Sherard Ingram.

In 2021, the group released the 35-track retrospective compilation 3 Chairs Collection (1997-2013) for digital download.

== Discography ==
=== Albums ===
- 3 Chairs (2004)

=== Singles and EPs ===
- Three Chairs (1997)
- Three Chairs 2 (1998)
- All Over (2003)
- No Drum Machine Pt. 2 (2006)
- Demigods (2013)

=== Compilations ===
- Spectrum (2009)
- 3 Chairs Collection (1997-2013) (2021)
