= American Intelligence =

Studio album by Theo Parrish
- Released: November 17, 2014
- Genre: Electronic
- Length: 122:00
- Label: Sound Signature

Theo Parrish chronology
Sketches (2010)	American Intelligence (2014)	Wuddaji (2020)

American Intelligence is a studio album by American DJ and record producer Theo Parrish. It was released on November 17, 2014, through Sound Signature.

== Background ==
Theo Parrish is an American DJ and record producer based in Detroit. American Intelligence contains 15 tracks. The vinyl edition contains nine tracks in a different order. The album was released on November 17, 2014, through Sound Signature.

== Critical reception ==
Professional ratings
Review scores
Source	Rating
The Arts Desk	3/5 stars
Pitchfork	8.3/10
Record Collector	4/5 stars
Resident Advisor	3.5/5

Albert Freeman of The Quietus commented that "Theo Parrish is a rare artist whose work is deeply connected with the past while remaining firmly trained on the future, and while American Intelligence will surely remain an outlier and the product of the unique mind that created it, his visionary ideas towards continuing to push music forwards, now, a decade ago, or for the foreseeable future, stand without serious doubt." Paul Bowler of Record Collector stated, "for the most part, this is a work whose complex arrangements take time to reveal their riches." Aaron Coultate of Resident Advisor wrote, "American Intelligence is not as easy to love as Parrish's best 12-inches," adding that "it's the next chapter for an artist who isn't interested in repeating himself."

=== Accolades ===
Year-end lists for American Intelligence
Publication	List	Rank	Ref.
Crack	Albums of the Year 2014	35	
Thump	The 50 Best Albums of 2014	34	

Decade-end lists for American Intelligence
Publication	List	Rank	Ref.
Mixmag	The 72 Best Albums of the Decade 2010–2019	—	

== Track listing ==
American Intelligence CD 1 track listing
No.	Title	Length
1.	"Drive"	10:50
2.	"Life Spice"	7:35
3.	"Welcome Back"	3:01
4.	"Tympanic Warfare"	9:36
5.	"Fallen Funk"	9:58
6.	"Ah" (featuring Marcellus Pittman, Ideeyah, and Duminie Deporres)	10:28
7.	"Make No War"	7:32

American Intelligence CD 2 track listing
No.	Title	Length
1.	"Cypher Delight"	7:14
2.	"...There Here"	8:33
3.	"Thug Irony"	5:37
4.	"Creepcake"	3:56
5.	"Enjoy Watching You" (featuring Sass and Ruby)	4:14
6.	"Helmutlampshade"	8:43
7.	"Be In Yo Self" (featuring Ideeyah and Duminie Deporres)	13:07
8.	"Footwork"	11:49
