= Hope, Future and Destiny =

Studio album by Nicole Mitchell
- Released: 2004
- Recorded: October, 2003 & March–September, 2004
- Studio: Delmark Studios, Chicago
- Genre: Jazz
- Length: 64:50
- Label: Dreamtime
- Producer: Nicole Mitchell

Nicole Mitchell chronology
Afrika Rising (2002)	Hope, Future and Destiny (2004)	Indigo Trio:Live in Montreal (2007)

Hope, Future and Destiny is an album by American jazz flautist Nicole Mitchell, which was released in 2004 on Dreamtime, the label she established with David Boykin. It was the third recording by her Black Earth Ensemble. This work was the musical score for a multi-arts community play involving a cast of over 50 people in dance, video, acting and live original music.

== Reception ==
Professional ratings
Review scores
Source	Rating
AllMusic	4.5/5 stars

In his review for AllMusic, Thom Jurek states "The music found on this disc is ambitious. Despite the work's sprawling reach, the music is deeply focused; its center is poetic, lyrical, and swinging. Her compositions reach across sound worlds, the African continent, and jazz genres."

In a review for JazzTimes Martin Johnson describes the album as "a fascinating sprawl full of classic musical references and Afrocentric concerns" and notes that "Mitchell's ambitious, quality music puts her firmly within the hallowed AACM tradition."

The All About Jazz review by Florence Wetzel states "The CD is an aural feast with some of the most joyful, uplifting jazz in recent memory, a panoply of sounds and textures including funk, Caribbean, Latin and blues, plus a healthy dose of the Association for the AACM aesthetic."

== Track listing ==
All compositions by Nicole Mitchell.

1. "Wondrous Birth (intro)" – 1:59
2. "Wondrous Birth" – 6:23
3. "Curbside Fantasee" – 6:52
4. "For Daughters of Young Love" – 2:07
5. "Journey for 3 Blue Stones" – 9:59
6. "Message from the Mothergoddes" – 4:12
7. "In the Garden" – 6:21
8. "Skating" – 8:32
9. "Wanna Make You Smile" – 1:29
10. "Future's Meditation" – 6:53
11. "The Healing Ritual" – 2:42
12. "Time for Change" – 3:16
13. "Journey for 3 Blue Stones" – 3:44

== Personnel ==
- Nicole Mitchell – alto flute, vocals, flute, melodica
- David Boykin – tenor sax, soprano sax, bass clarinet
- Tony Herrera – trombone, shells
- Corey Wilkes – trumpet
- Savoir Faire – violin
- Tomeka Reid – cello
- Brian Nichols – piano, glockenspiel
- Tim Jones – guitar
- Josh Abrams – double bass
- Arveeayl Ra – drums, gongs
- Art "Turk" Burton – percussion
- Eddie Armstrong – shekere, rainstick, vocals
- Glenda Zahra Baker – vocals, rainstick
- Aquila Sadalla – vocals
