= Theo Parrish =

American DJ and record producer (born 1972)

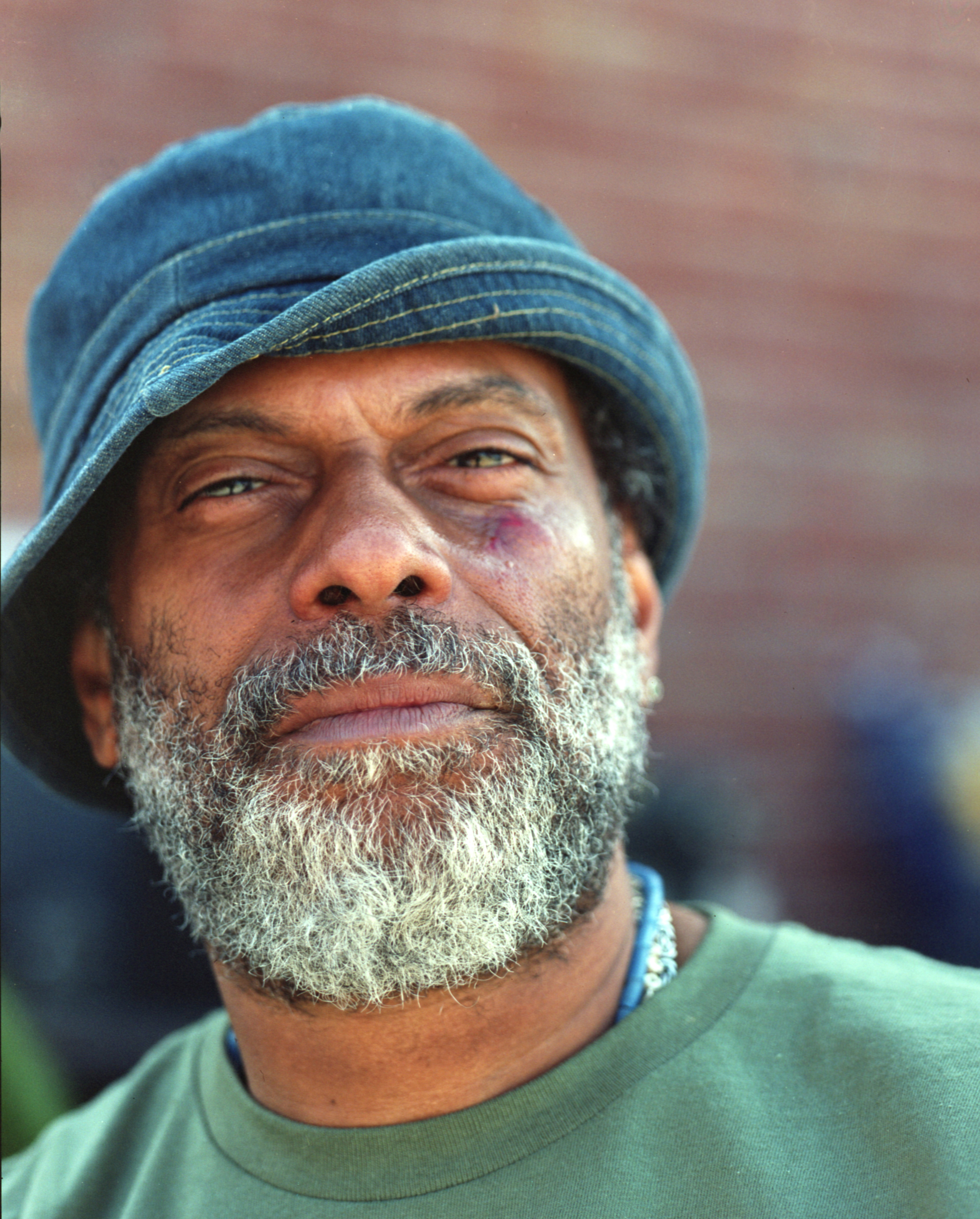
- Theo Parrish in April 2026 before a show in Oakland, California.

Background information
- Born: 1972 (age 53–54)
- Origin: Washington, D.C.
- Genres: Deep house
- Occupations: DJ; record producer
- Years active: 1998–present
- Labels: Sound Signature; Peacefrog; Submerge; Ugly Edits
- Member of: 3 Chairs; The Rotating Assembly; T.O.M. Project

Theo Parrish (born 1972) is an American DJ and record producer based in Detroit, Michigan, and known for his genre-spanning DJ sets and unconventional house productions. He is an owner of the Sound Signature record label, and a member of the group 3 Chairs.

== Biography ==
Theo Parrish was born in Washington, D.C. in 1972. He grew up in Chicago, Illinois, listening to Miles Davis, Nina Simone, and George Gershwin. He studied at the Chicago Academy of the Arts and the Kansas City Art Institute. While at KCAI, he concentrated on sound sculptures, creating sonic pieces by combining live instruments, human voices, and looped recordings. In 1994, he received his Bachelor of Fine Arts degree.

After graduating, Parrish moved to Detroit and became involved in the city's music scene, eventually releasing the track "Lake Shore Drive" as a B-side to a Moodymann 12" in 1995. His first solo release was the Baby Steps EP on Elevate in 1996. Parrish launched the label Sound Signature in 1997, and followed with his debut LP First Floor in 1998 on Peacefrog Records. He also released American Intelligence (2014).

He is a member of 3 Chairs, with Detroit DJs Rick Wilhite, Moodymann, and Marcellus Pitman, The Rotating Assembly, and of T.O.M. Project. He often used the Akai MPC 2000XL in his productions.

== Style ==
Parrish became known for his eclectic house DJ sets, in which he mixed "classics and obscurities" from disco, jazz, soul, and new wave. His early releases weaved these influences into "slow-burning, immersive grooves." Vice stated that "his lengthy sets are masterclasses in the manipulation of black dance music, EQ heavy workouts that educate, entertain and inform," and added that "Parrish has an innate understanding of the pleasure that comes with repetition."

== Discography ==
=== Studio albums ===
- First Floor (Peacefrog Records, 1998)
- Parallel Dimensions (Sound Signature, 2000)
- Sound Sculptures Volume 1 (Sound Signature, 2007)
- Et Tu Brute (with Duminie Deporres; Submerge Recordings, 2007)
- Sketches (Sound Signature, 2010)
- American Intelligence (Sound Signature, 2014)
- Wuddaji (Sound Signature, 2020)

=== Compilation albums ===
- Sound Signature Sounds (Sound Signature, 2000)
- Sound Signature Sounds Vol. 2 (Sound Signature, 2012)
- Black Jazz Signature (Snow Dog Records, 2013)
- DJ-Kicks: Theo Parrish (!K7, 2022)
