= Vision Quest (album) =

Live album by Nicole Mitchell
- Released: 2001
- Recorded: June & July 2000
- Venue: HotHouse, Soul Vegetarian East, Duncan YMCA, Chicago River, Chicago
- Genre: Jazz
- Length: 73:30
- Label: Dreamtime
- Producer: Nicole Mitchell

Nicole Mitchell chronology
Vision Quest (2001)	Afrika Rising (2002)

Vision Quest is the debut album by American jazz flautist Nicole Mitchell with her group Black Earth Ensemble, which was released in 2001 on Dreamtime, the label she established with David Boykin.

== Reception ==
Professional ratings
Review scores
Source	Rating
AllMusic	4/5 stars

In his review for AllMusic, Alain Drouot states "Her pieces display her knack for pretty melodies full of spirituality and poetry, whether they take the form of a reverie or are developed over a solid groove."

The Exclaim! review by David Dacks says "Vision Quest is both dissonant and groovy all the way through, and that is worth celebrating."

== Track listing ==
All compositions by Nicole Mitchell

1. "Sanctuary: Aaya's Rainbow" – 7:11
2. "Vision Quest Part One: Seeking Enlightenment" – 6:06
3. "Vision Quest Parts Two/Three: Journey of Discovery/The Unknown " – 4:10
4. "Episodes of an Obscure Life Episode One" – 3:57
5. "Episodes of an Obscure Life Episodes Two/Three" – 3:11
6. "Daddy Gone" – 6:27
7. "Bird of Desire" – :23
8. "Sweet Tooth" – 3:13
9. "Off the Clock" – 5:36
10. "For the Brave" – 2:26
11. "On the Nile" – 15:42
12. "Tale of Youth's Adventures" – 6:34
13. "The Bath" – 8:42

== Personnel ==
- Nicole Mitchell – alto flute, flute, piccolo, flutaphone, vocals
- Savoir Faire – violin, viola
- Darius Savage – bass
- Hamid Drake – percussion
- Arveeayl Ra – percussion
- Edith Yokley – violin
