= Soliloquy (Walter Bishop Jr. album) =

Studio album by Walter Bishop Jr.
- Released: 1976
- Recorded: January 1975
- Studio: Red Gate Studio, NYC
- Genre: Jazz
- Label: Seebreeze; SB-1002
- Producer: Fred Norsworthy

Walter Bishop Jr. chronology
Valley Land (1974)	Soliloquy (1976)	Old Folks (1977)

Soliloquy is a solo album by pianist Walter Bishop Jr. which was recorded in 1975 and released on the Seabreeze label.

== Reception ==
Professional ratings
Review scores
Source	Rating
AllMusic	2.5/5 stars

Scott Yanow of AllMusic stated "Walter Bishop, Jr.'s first (and thus far only) full set of unaccompanied piano solos sounds fine. ... although one often wishes that the bop-oriented pianist had been joined by bass and drums (which might have inspired him to play with more passion on this occasion). Worthwhile but not essential music".

== Track listing ==
1. "Up Jumped Spring" (Freddie Hubbard) – 7:42
2. "I Can't Get Started" (Vernon Duke, Ira Gershwin) – 5:36
3. "A Day in the Life of a Fool" (Luiz Bonfá) – 5:15
4. "I Got Rhythm" (George Gershwin, Ira Gershwin ) – 4:57
5. "Here's That Rainy Day" (Jimmy Van Heusen, Johnny Burke) – 8:30
6. "All the Things You Are" (Jerome Kern, Oscar Hammerstein II) – 5:27

== Personnel ==
- Walter Bishop Jr. – piano
