= Renegades (Nicole Mitchell album) =

Studio album by Nicole Mitchell
- Released: 2009
- Recorded: December 12–14, 2008
- Studio: Riverside Studios, Chicago
- Genre: Jazz
- Length: 67:21
- Label: Delmark
- Producer: Robert G. Koester

Nicole Mitchell chronology
Anaya (2009)	Renegades (2009)	Emerald Hills (2010)

Renegades is an album by American jazz flautist Nicole Mitchell, recorded in 2008 and released on Delmark. It was the first album by her Black Earth Strings, a band that brings African rhythms, contemporary sounds and swinging improvisation to a chamber music setting.

== Reception ==
Professional ratings
Review scores
Source	Rating
AllMusic	4/5 stars
Down Beat	3.5/5 stars

In his review for AllMusic, Alex Henderson notes that "Baker and Reid's strings do a lot to shape the sound of Mitchell's quintet, which incorporates elements of Euro-classical chamber music but has strong African, Asian, and Middle Eastern influences as well."

The Down Beat review by Peter Margasak says "With a composer open to exploring as many sounds and approaches as Mitchell, it’s important to have a group that keep things grounded, and despite the range of the pieces here, the music never feels dilettantish or erratic."

The All About Jazz review by Troy Collins states "Avoiding eclectic posturing by virtue of her compositional acumen, Mitchell's writing eschews stylistic boundaries to embrace a multiplicity of genres, making each one her own. An endlessly fascinating listen, Renegades is her most compelling record to date, and a sure contender for many end of the year lists."

The Point of Departure review by Bill Shoemaker says "Mitchell’s scores span folkloric gravity, bright swing and romantic blush. As is the case with her other projects, Mitchell manages to make listening to jazz a teachable moment, but without the pedantry that has become part and parcel of such exercises since the rise of the Neo Cons."

== Track listing ==
All compositions by Nicole Mitchell

1. "Crossroads" – 5:54
2. "No Matter What" – 3:49
3. "Ice" – 3:53
4. "Windance" – 3:50
5. "Renegades" – 3:24
6. "By My Own Grace" – 5:28
7. "What If" – 4:36
8. "Symbology #2A" – 1:56
9. "Wade" – 6:03
10. "Waterdance" – 5:19
11. "Symbology #1" – 3:32
12. "Mama Found Out" – 4:17
13. "If I Could Have You the Way I Want You" – 4:00
14. "Symbology #2" – 1:40
15. "Waris Dire" – 5:43
16. "Aaya's Rainbow" – 3:47

== Personnel ==
- Nicole Mitchell - flute, alto flute, piccolo flute
- Renee Baker – violin, viola
- Tomeka Reid – cello
- Josh Abrams – bass, gimbri
- Shirazette Tinnin – drums, percussion
