= Black Jazz Records =

American music company

- Founded: 1969
- Founder: Gene Russell; Dick Schory
- Defunct: 1975
- Distributor: Ovation Records
- Genre: Jazz
- Country of origin: U.S.
- Location: Oakland, California

Black Jazz Records was a jazz record company and label founded in Oakland, California, by pianist Gene Russell and percussionist Dick Schory. The label was created to promote the talents of young African American jazz musicians and singers, and released twenty albums between 1971 and 1975. The artists who recorded for Black Jazz Records included Cleveland Eaton, former bassist for Count Basie and Ramsey Lewis, and organist/pianist Doug Carn, whose four albums were the most successful of any Black Jazz artist. Carn's wife at the time, Jean Carn, sang on his albums; she later changed her name to Jean Carne and had a successful solo career as an R&B singer. Singer Kellee Patterson gained notice as the first black Miss Indiana in 1971, before recording her debut album, Maiden Voyage, with Black Jazz Records in 1973. The label was distributed and financed by Ovation Records, a country and western label based in Chicago, which was also founded by Schory. Black Jazz Records was considered at the time to be the first jazz label started by an African American since brothers John and Reb Spikes started Sunshine Records in 1921. (Note: Sunshine Records only released six records, all by Kid Ory's jazz band. Black Swan Records, also founded in 1921 by Harry Pace, specialized in jazz and blues. It is more commonly known as the first black-owned jazz label due to its wider distribution. The Billboard article also fails to mention Debut Records, a jazz label started in 1952 by bassist Charlie Mingus, his wife Celia, and drummer Max Roach.)

== History ==
Black Jazz Records was founded in 1969, and released its first four albums on August 1, 1971. The founders were Gene Russell, a jazz pianist, and Dick Schory, a Grammy-nominated percussionist also known for his development of the stereo recording techniques quadraphonic sound, Dynagroove, and RCA Victor's Stereo Action. Schory founded Ovation Records in 1969, after leaving RCA. Ovation financed and distributed Black Jazz Records, while Russell served as an A&R executive. Russell also produced and engineered the label's initial releases, while maintaining complete artistic control through his production company, GR Productions.

Russell's vision for Black Jazz Records was for it to be geared towards the Black community, and all of the artists recording for the label were African American. The label was created as an alternative to traditional jazz, invoking a more political and spiritual tone, often with funk overtones. Black Jazz released various types of music including, funk, free jazz and soul jazz. Black Jazz Records was also known for its unique album cover concept, which was copyrighted by the label. The concept included a design that allowed the title to be shown regardless of how the albums were positioned in the browsing rack at record stores. All of the albums had white lettering on a black background, with the liner notes and personnel listed in the same place on each of the label's releases. Russell organized a promotional tour for the label in September 1971. In addition to promoting the first four Black Jazz albums, Russell and his marketing consultant Ray Lawrence did radio, television and newspaper interviews to showcase the label and its artists. A 1974 Billboard magazine article reported that Doug Carn, one of the label's more successful artists, sold more records than Dave Brubeck and Ramsey Lewis at that time. The label existed for six years during its first run, folding in 1975.

== Re-discovery ==
=== James Hardge ===
Gene Russell closed Black Jazz Records in 1975 to focus on his new label, Aquarican Records. He started the new label in an effort to "remove the stigma attached to jazz titles." Russell intended to move Black Jazz artists to Aquarican Records, but he did not sign his first artist to the label until 1980, when he signed singer Talita Long. Long recorded with Gene Russell as well as Henry Franklin, and is the mother of actress Nia Long. Gene Russell died in 1981, and the albums from Black Jazz Records faded out of circulation until 1986, when James Hardge, Jr. bought the inactive label's master recordings. By the early 1990s, he had re-issued the entire collection on compact disc, including a new release by Doug Carn.

Interest in Black Jazz was revived in the early 1990s when Carn's songs "Infant Eyes", "Adam's Apple", and "Spirit in a New Land" became popular in England and Japan. The label's music also became popular through samples used by hip-hop artists such as Ice Cube and A Tribe Called Quest. This new demand led to numerous bootleg copies of Black Jazz material entering the market. While Hardge maintains a Myspace page for the label, attempts to sell the CDs online were unsuccessful, and he eventually offered Black Jazz Records for sale on Craigslist for $285,000 in 2011. The Black Jazz catalog was eventually licensed to the Japanese label Snow Dog Records.

=== Snow Dog Records ===
Snow Dog Records acquired the licensing to Black Jazz Records in 2012, and began reissuing the albums as its first project. The remastered albums included new liner notes and previously unpublished photographs. They have also released a series featuring remixes of Black Jazz material produced by DJ's from Japan, Germany, and the United States: DJ Mitsu, Gilles Peterson, Muro, and Theo Parrish.

== Legacy ==
The legacy of Black Jazz Records has been kept alive by reissues of its albums, remixes and samples by DJ's and hip-hop artists. There have also been occasional tours and concerts where former Black Jazz artists have performed music from their recordings with the label. Doug Carn, Rudolph Johnson and Henry Franklin joined other veteran musicians as the Black Jazz Allstars, and performed a series of shows at the Center for African and African American Art and Culture in San Francisco, California, from April 29 to May 7, 2000. Guitarist Calvin Keys joined former label mates Henry Franklin and Carl Burnett in "Heroes of Black Jazz, a Tribute to Gene Russell", on July 14, 2011 at the Barbara Morrison Performing Arts Center in Leimert Park, Los Angeles. Calvin Keys' first album, Shawn-Neeq, originally recorded with Black Jazz Records in 1971, was re-issued by Tompkins Square Records in 2012. Keys celebrated the re-issue of "Shawn-Neeq" by performing the entire album at Yoshi's jazz club in San Francisco, California on January 5, 2012. Doug Carn and his ex-wife Jean Carne played together at the 2013 Savannah Jazz Festival in Savannah, Georgia on September 28, 2013.

== Black Jazz Records discography ==
BJQD	Artists	Title	Recorded
1	Gene Russell	New Direction	1971
2	Walter Bishop Jr.	Coral Keys	1971
3	Doug Carn	Infant Eyes	1971
4	Rudolph Johnson	Spring Rain	1971
5	Calvin Keys	Shawn-Neeq	1971
6	Chester Thompson	Powerhouse	1971
7	Henry Franklin	The Skipper	1972
8	Doug Carn	Spirit of the New Land	1972
9	The Awakening	Hear, Sense and Feel	1972
10	Gene Russell	Talk To My Lady	1973
11	Rudolph Johnson	The Second Coming	1973
12	Kellee Patterson	Maiden Voyage	1973
14	Walter Bishop, Jr.	Keeper of My Soul	1973
15	The Awakening	Mirage	1973
16	Doug Carn	Revelation	1973
17	Henry Franklin	The Skipper At Home	1974
18	Calvin Keys	Proceed With Caution!	1974
19	Roland Haynes	The Second Wave	1975
20	Cleveland Eaton	Plenty Good Eaton	1975
21	Doug Carn	Adam's Apple	1974
22	Doug Carn	New Incentive: Firm Roots	2001

== Black Jazz releases under Snow Dog Records ==
=== Re-mix series ===
BJQD	Artists	Title	Recorded
1	DJ Mitsu	The Beats: Solid Black	2012
2	Gilles Peterson	Black Jazz Radio	2012
3	Muro	King of Diggin': Diggin' Black Jazz	2013
4	Theo Parrish	Black Jazz Signature - Black Jazz Records: 1971-1976	2013

== Musicians ==
- Gene Russell - Piano
- Calvin Keys - Guitar
- Walter Bishop, Jr. - Piano
- Henry Franklin - Bass
- Doug Carn - Piano, Organ, Keyboards
- Jean Carn - Vocalist
- Cleveland Eaton - bass
- Kellee Patterson - Vocalist
- The Awakening - Instrumental Group
- Chester Thompson - Organ
- Rudolph Johnson - Saxophone
