= Soul Village =

Studio album by Walter Bishop Jr.
- Released: 1977
- Recorded: June 1977
- Studio: CI Recording, NYC
- Genre: Jazz
- Label: Muse; MR 5142
- Producer: Mitch Farber

Walter Bishop Jr. chronology
Old Folks (1977)	Soul Village (1977)	Hot House (1977)

Soul Village is an album by pianist Walter Bishop Jr. which was recorded in 1977 and released on the Muse label.

== Reception ==
Professional ratings
Review scores
Source	Rating
AllMusic	2.5/5 stars

Ron Wynn of AllMusic stated "Interesting, often intriguing work that plays off a village concept on the title track, but is otherwise a pretty standard, although expertly performed, batch of standards and bop originals".

== Track listing ==
All compositions by Walter Bishop Jr. except where noted.

1. "Soul Turnaround" – 9:10
2. "Valerie" (Walter Bishop Jr., Mitch Farber) – 5:46
3. "Sweet Rosa" – 6:43
4. "Philadelphia Bright" (Farber) – 6:40
5. "Coral Keys" – 5:28
6. "Soul Village" – 8:17

== Personnel ==
- Walter Bishop Jr. – electric piano
- Randy Brecker – trumpet, flugelhorn
- George Young – soprano saxophone, alto saxophone
- Gerry Niewood – tenor saxophone, flute
- Steve Khan – guitar
- Mark Egan – bass
- Ed Soph – drums
- Victoria – congas, percussion
