= Walter Bishop Jr. =

American jazz pianist

Background information
- Also known as: Ibrahim ibn Ismail
- Born: October 4, 1927 New York City, New York, U.S.
- Died: January 24, 1998 (aged 70) New York City
- Genres: Jazz
- Occupation: Musician
- Instrument: Piano
- Years active: 1940s–1990s
- Labels: Black Lion, Prestige, Xanadu, Black Jazz, Muse, East Wind, Pony Canyon, Red, DIW
- Formerly of: Milt Jackson, Stan Getz, Charlie Parker, Oscar Pettiford, Kai Winding, Miles Davis

Walter Bishop Jr. (October 4, 1927 – January 24, 1998) was an American jazz pianist.

== Early life ==
Bishop was born in New York City on October 4, 1927. He had at least two sisters, Marian and Beverly. His father was composer Walter Bishop Sr. In his teens, Bishop Jr.'s friends included future jazz musicians Kenny Drew, Sonny Rollins, and Art Taylor. He was brought up in Harlem. He left high school to play in dance bands in the area. In 1945–47 he was in the Army Air Corps. During his military service in 1947 Bishop was based near St Louis and met touring bebop musicians.

== Later life and career ==
Later in 1947, he returned to New York. That year (or 1949) he was part of drummer Art Blakey's band for 14 weeks and recorded with them. Bishop developed his bebop playing in part by playing in jam sessions at Minton's Playhouse.

He recorded with Milt Jackson and Stan Getz in 1949, then played with Charlie Parker (1951–54), Oscar Pettiford, Kai Winding, and Miles Davis (1951–53). At this time he was also a drug addict, which led to imprisonment and the withdrawal of his New York City Cabaret Card. In 1956, he recorded with Hank Mobley. According to the New Grove Dictionary of Jazz, "at some point he became a Muslim and took the name Ibrahim ibn Ismail, but he did not use this publicly." In the early 1960s he also led his own trio with Jimmy Garrison and G. T. Hogan.

After studying at The Juilliard School with Hall Overton in the late 1960s, Bishop taught music theory at colleges in Los Angeles in the 1970s. At some point prior to moving from New York to Los Angeles, Bishop met and married the former Valerie Isabel Paul. They then moved to Los Angeles. According Jay Blotcher, Valerie Bishop's son from a previous relationship, after divorcing Walter Bishop in the mid-1970s, Valerie Bishop worked as an assistant for Ike and Tina Turner in California. Valerie Bishop was cited by Tina Turner in Turner's memoir I, Tina as the person who inspired Turner to pursue Buddhism.

In the 1980s, Bishop taught at the University of Hartford. By this time, he made frequent appearances at clubs and festivals in New York. He also wrote a book, A Study in Fourths, about jazz improvisation based on cycles of fourths and fifths. His debut recording as a leader was in the 1960s. He continued performing into the 1990s.

Bishop died of a heart attack at the Veterans Affairs Medical Center in Manhattan on January 24, 1998. He was survived by his wife, Keiko; his mother, and two sisters.

== Playing style ==
Bishop was influenced at an early stage by Bud Powell. Later, Bishop was "known for holding back on the beat, a device that added tension to the music."

== Discography ==
=== As leader ===
Year recorded	Title	Label	Personnel/Notes
1961	Speak Low	Jazztime	Trio, with Jimmy Garrison (bass), G.T. Hogan (drums); also released by Black Lion as Milestones
1962	A Pair of "Naturals"	Operators	Trio, with Butch Warren (bass), G.T. Hogan (drums); LP shared with Peter Yorke Orchestra
1963	Summertime	Cotillion	Trio, with Butch Warren (bass), Jimmy Cobb (drums)
1964–68	Bish Bash	Xanadu	Some tracks trio, with Eddie Khan (bass), Dick Berk (drums); some tracks quartet, with Frank Haynes (tenor sax) added; some tracks trio with Reggie Johnson (bass), Idris Muhammad (drums)
1971	Coral Keys	Black Jazz	Most tracks quartet, with Harold Vick (flute, soprano sax, tenor sax), Reggie Johnson (bass), Alan Shwaetz Benger and Idris Muhammad (drums; separately); some tracks quintet, with Woody Shaw (trumpet) added
1973	Keeper of My Soul	Black Jazz	With Ronnie Laws (flute, sax), Woody Murray (vibraphone), Gerald Brown (bass, electric bass), Bahir Hassan (drums), Shakur M. Abdulla (congas, bongos)
1974	Valley Land	Muse	Trio, with Sam Jones (bass), Billy Hart (drums)
1975	Soliloquy	Seabreeze	Solo piano
1976	Solo Piano	Interplay(Japan)	Solo piano. Recorded on October 21, 1976.
1976	Old Folks	East Wind	Trio, with Sam Jones (bass) Billy Higgins (drums)
1977	Soul Village	Muse	With Randy Brecker (trumpet, flugelhorn), George Young (soprano sax, alto sax), Gerry Niewood (tenor sax, flute), Steve Khan (guitar), Mark Egan (bass), Ed Soph (drums), Victoria (congas, percussion)
1977–78	Hot House	Muse	Some tracks trio, with Sam Jones (bass), Al Foster (drums); some tracks quintet, with Bill Hardman (trumpet), Junior Cook (tenor sax) added; released 1979
1978	Cubicle	Muse	With Randy Brecker (trumpet, flugelhorn), Curtis Fuller (trombone), Rene McLean (soprano sax, alto sax, tenor sax), Pepper Adams (baritone sax), Joe Caro (guitar), Bob Cranshaw (Fender bass), Billy Hart (drums), Ray Mantilla (percussion); Mark Egan (Fender bass), Carmen Lundy (vocals) added for one or two tracks
1978	The Trio		with Billy Hart, George Mraz
1988	Just in Time	Interplay	Trio, with Paul Brown (bass), Walter Bolden (drums)
1989	Ode to Bird	Interplay	Trio, with Paul Brown (bass), Walter Bolden (drums)
1990	What's New	DIW	Trio, with Peter Washington (bass), Kenny Washington (drums)
1991	Midnight Blue	Red	Trio, with Reggie Johnson (bass), Doug Sides (drums)
1993	Speak Low Again	Venus	Trio, with Paul Brown (bass), Al Harewood (drums)

=== Compilation ===
- 1965 The Walter Bishop Jr. Trio / 1965 (Prestige), compiles A Pair of "Naturals" and Summertime

=== As sideman ===
With Gene Ammons

- Up Tight! (Prestige, 1961)
- Boss Soul! (Prestige, 1961)

With Shorty Baker and Doc Cheatham

- Shorty & Doc (Swingville, 1961)

With Art Blakey

- Blakey (EmArcy, 1954)
- Art Blakey Big Band (Bethlehem, 1957)

With Rocky Boyd

- Ease It (Jazztime, 1961)

With Miles Davis

- Dig (Prestige, 1951)
- Collectors' Items (Prestige, 1956)

With Kenny Dorham

- Kenny Dorham Quintet (Debut, 1953)
- Inta Somethin' (Pacific Jazz, 1961)

With Curtis Fuller

- Boss of the Soul-Stream Trombone (Warwick, 1960)
- The Magnificent Trombone of Curtis Fuller (Epic, 1961)
- Fire and Filigree (Bee Hive, 1978)

With John Handy

- Jazz (Roulette, 1962)

With Bill Hardman

- Focus (Muse, 1980 [1984])
- Politely (Muse, 1981 [1982])

With Milt Jackson

- Meet Milt Jackson (Savoy, 1949)

With Ken McIntyre

- Looking Ahead (New Jazz, 1960)

With Jackie McLean

- Swing, Swang, Swingin' (Blue Note, 1959)
- Capuchin Swing (Blue Note, 1961)

With Blue Mitchell

- Blue Mitchell (Mainstream, 1971)
- Vital Blue (Mainstream, 1971)

With Hank Mobley

- Mobley's 2nd Message (Prestige, 1956)

With Charlie Parker

- Swedish Schnapps (Verve 1951) side 2
- Fiesta (Verve 1952)
- Charlie Parker Plays Cole Porter (Verve, 1954)
- One Night in Birdland (Columbia, 1950 [1977])
- Live at Rockland Palace (Parker Records, 1952 [1983])

With Oscar Pettiford

- The New Oscar Pettiford Sextet (Debut, 1953)

With Dizzy Reece

- Soundin' Off (Blue Note, 1960)

With Charlie Rouse

- Takin' Care of Business (Jazzland, 1960)

With Archie Shepp

- On Green Dolphin Street (Denon, 1978)

With Sonny Stitt

- Broadway Soul (Colpix, 1965)

With Harold Vick

- Commitment (Muse, 1967 [1974])

With Stan Getz Zoot Sims etc.

- The Brothers (Prestige, 1949)
