= Doug Carn =

American jazz musician (born 1948)

Doug Carn (born July 14, 1948) is an American jazz musician from St. Augustine, Florida, formerly married to Jean Carne and known for his several albums released for Black Jazz Records. Carn is a multi-instrumentalist known primarily for his work on organ and piano.

== Career ==
Carn studied oboe and composition at Jacksonville University from 1965 to 1967, then finished his education at Georgia State College in 1969. He also taught piano and jazz improvisation at Jacksonville University for several years.

He, along with Chris Lightburn and Rev. H. L. Patterson of St. Mary's Baptist Church, founded the Lincolnville Restoration and Development Committee in his home town of St. Augustine in 1979. One of the group's projects was the organizing, in 1979, of the annual Lincolnville Festival, which has continued into the 21st century and become one of the Ancient City's leading cultural events.

Carn recorded several albums on the Black Jazz Records label during the 1970s that have since achieved cult classic status, including Infant Eyes, Adam's Apple, and Revelation. He worked with Nat Adderley, Earth, Wind & Fire, Shirley Horn, Lou Donaldson, Stanley Turrentine, and Irene Reid. In 1997 Carn and other jazz organists including Dr. Lonnie Smith and Reuben Wilson recorded Bongobop with The Essence Allstars that featured both solo performances and a duet with Joey DeFrancesco. He was featured on drummer Cindy Blackman's (of Lenny Kravitz fame) album Another Lifetime. Since 2010 Carn and ex-wife Jean have been performing and touring together; including weekend appearances in 2012 at Ronnie Scott's in London and in 2013 at Lincoln Center and the Iridium in NYC and the Savannah Jazz Festival. His release My Spirit (2015), included live performances of selections from the Black Jazz albums, peaking at No. 46 on the JazzWeek chart.

== Discography ==
=== As leader ===
- 1969: The Doug Carn Trio (Savoy)
- 1971: Infant Eyes (Black Jazz)
- 1972: Spirit of the New Land (Black Jazz) with Jean Carn
- 1973: Revelation (Black Jazz) with Jean Carn
- 1974: Adam's Apple (Black Jazz)
- 1976: Higher Ground (Ovation) with Jean Carn
- 1977: Al Rahman! Cry of the Floridian Tropic Son (Tablighi Records) as Abdul Rahim Ibrahim
- 1995: In A Mellow Tone (Lighthouse Records)
- 2001: A New Incentive "Firm Roots" (Black Jazz)
- 2015: My Spirit [live] (Doodlin' Records)
- 2019: Free For All (Doodlin' Records)
- 2020: Jazz Is Dead 5 (Jazz Is Dead) with Adrian Younge and Ali Shaheed Muhammad

With The Essence Allstars

- 1997: Bongobop (Hip Bop Essence)

=== As sideman ===
With Calvin Keys

- Vertical Clearance (2005)

With Cindy Blackman

- Another Lifetime (2010)

With Curtis Fuller

- Keep It Simple (Savant, 2005)

With Intuit

- Intuit (2004)

With Melvin Van Peebles

- As Serious as a Heart-Attack (1974)

With Wallace Roney

- Home (HighNote, 2010 [2012])
