= Wide Hive Records =

Record label in Berkeley, California

- Founded: 1997
- Founder: Gregory Howe
- Genre: Jazz, funk, hip hop
- Country of origin: U.S.
- Location: Berkeley, California
- Official website: www.widehive.com

Wide Hive Records is an independent record label based in Berkeley, California. It was founded by Gregory Howe in 1997 in San Francisco's Mission District as a record label, live music venue, recording studio and café.

In its early incarnation Wide Hive hosted live acts and recorded, mixed, and mastered CDs of the performances that were available to the audience for purchase at the end of the show.

Since the release of its first record, Dissent, in 1997, Wide Hive has released over thirty titles ranging from jazz to turntablism, downtempo, and funk. Artists on the label include Larry Coryell, Phil Ranelin, Calvin Keys, Daggerboard, Erik Jekabson, Throttle Elevator Music with Kamasi Washington, Henry Franklin, Roscoe Mitchell, DJ Zeph, MC Azeem and DJ Quest. Wide Hive Records had five College Music Journal top ten placements between 2001 and 2010 with DJ Zeph, Variable Unit Seven Grain, Variable Unit Handbook for the Apocalypse, Variable Unit Mayhem Mystics and Wide Hive Players II Guitar, respectively.
