= Gene Russell =

American jazz musician

William Eugene Russell (February 12, 1926 – May 5, 1981), known as Gene Russell, was an American pop, jazz, and soul keyboardist who played acoustic and Fender Rhodes. He is mainly known for founding and releasing albums on Black Jazz Records.

Russell was born in Los Angeles, California and was a cousin of guitarist Charlie Christian. He studied with Hampton Hawes. In the 1960s and 1970s, he composed music for film and television also appearing as an actor. Russell played with Rahsaan Roland Kirk, Zoot Sims, William (Bill) Hillman, Leroy Vinnegar, Dexter Gordon, Wardell Gray and Miles Davis.

With financing from Dick Schrory, Russell established Black Jazz Records in 1969. The aim of the record label was to promote young African American jazz musicians and singers.

He died in Los Angeles on May 5, 1981.

== Discography ==
- 1967: Takin' Care of Business (Dot Records) - As the Gene Russell Trio
- 1967: Up and Away (Decca)
- 1971: New Direction (Black Jazz)
- 1972: Talk to My Lady (Black Jazz)
- 1981: Autumn Leaves (Sea Breeze)
