= Mind Maintenance =

2021 studio album by Mind Maintenance

Studio album by Mind Maintenance (Joshua Abrams and Chad Taylor
- Released: 2021
- Genre: Jazz, minimalism, world music
- Label: Drag City; DC778

Mind Maintenance is an album by the duo of the same name, featuring Joshua Abrams on guimbri and Chad Taylor on mbira. It was released on vinyl in 2021 by the Drag City label.

Before the recording of the album, Abrams and Taylor, both multi-instrumentalists, had been playing together for over 25 years in ensembles such as Abrams' Natural Information Society, Rob Mazurek's Exploding Star Orchestra, and Sam Prekop's band. The album is unusual in that it pairs two instruments that originated in different parts of Africa and have no common repertoire, resulting in music derived from the distinctive sound of the instruments themselves.

== Reception ==
Professional ratings
Review scores
Source	Rating
Tom Hull – on the Web	B+

In an article for DownBeat, Daniel Margolis wrote, "By limiting themselves to these two ancient acoustic instruments, they exhibit brilliant use of space. You practically feel like you're in the room with them as their tools buzz and pulse together... this recording feels like a great choice for an evening of close listening on the home stereo system, or as a pleasant distraction in your earbuds as you go about your daily routine."

The Chicago Reader's Bill Meyer noted that, while the guembri is "low and resonant" and the mbira is "bright and sharp, with quick-decaying tones," "both instruments can articulate melodies and rhythms simultaneously." He stated: "The duo use this commonality to spin catchy figures into mesmerizing patterns. So many records released this year seem to be processing the pandemic's ongoing stress and strain, and a close listen to Mind Maintenance will dispel those states, at least temporarily."

Glenn Kimpton of Folk Radio UK described the music as "rhythmic enough to invite dancing and calming to the point of invoking hypnosis," and commented: "There is something wholly magnetising about this rare music and its insistently repetitive nature that is hard to switch from. Far from soporific, this is enchanting, exciting, beautifully performed music, and its release is impeccably timed."

Writing for HHV Magazine, Tim Caspar Boehme remarked: "together they develop a quiet power that has an immediate effect on one. Unlike other arts, music has this direct connection to the psyche and body, and can trigger all sorts of things, desired and undesired. Mind Maintenance does the same; it speaks to you without imposing itself. They simply convince through the ears."

Aquarium Drunkard's Tyler Wilcox stated that Taylor's mbira, "interlocking with Abrams' guimbri... sounds heavenly, blending beautifully over nine transcendent tracks." He wrote: "Taylor and Abrams are perfectly matched, reveling in their interplay, really listening, and responding to one another, natural as can be."

== Track listing ==
Composed by Joshua Abrams and Chad Taylor

1. "Glow & Glimmer" – 5:33
2. "Entrainment" – 6:19
3. "The Ladder" – 3:45
4. "Snap Yr Teeth" – 1:48
5. "Cyclic Bloom" – 5:12
6. "Valence" – 7:59
7. "Slack Water" – 6:18
8. "Complete Rain" – 4:28
9. "Mental Eyes" – 3:56

== Personnel ==
- Joshua Abrams – guimbri
- Chad Taylor – mbira
