= Represencing =

Studio album by Joshua Abrams
- Released: 2012
- Recorded: Summer 2011
- Studio: Joshua Abram's home studio, Chicago
- Genre: Free jazz, minimalism
- Length: 1:01:36
- Label: Eremite; MTE-58 (LP); MTE-62 (CD)
- Producer: Joshua Abrams, Michael Ehlers

Natural Information Society chronology
Natural Information (2010)	Represencing (2012)	Magnetoception (2015)

Represencing is a 2012 album by multi-instrumentalist and composer Joshua Abrams, on which he is joined by members of the Natural Information Society.

== Background ==
The album was recorded during the summer of 2011 at Abram's home studio in Chicago, and was initially released on vinyl in 2012 by Eremite Records. In 2014, it was reissued on CD by Eremite with an additional live track, and in 2020, it was reissued on vinyl in remastered form by the Belgian label Aguirre Records. Led by Joshua Abrams on guimbri, the group features flutist Nicole Mitchell, saxophonist David Boykin, bass clarinetist Jason Stein, electric guitarists Emmett Kelly and Jeff Parker, cellist Tomeka Reid, harmonium player Lisa Alvarado, drummers Chad Taylor and Mikel Avery, and percussionist Michael Zerang. Autoharpist Ben Boye and drummer Frank Rosaly appear on the bonus track.

== Reception ==
Professional ratings
Review scores
Source	Rating
DownBeat	4/5 stars
Tiny Mix Tapes	4/5 stars
Tom Hull – on the Web	B+

In an article for The New York Times, Nate Chinen noted the album's "earthy intelligence," describing it as "seductive, invested in the mysterious power of the drone," and writing: "It's music that hints at the ceremonial without losing its modern bearings."

DownBeat's Peter Margasak stated that Abrams' "savvy choice in collaborators, varied rhythms and effectively lean arrangements leaves little doubt that on Represencing he's carved out his own sonic world... It's a terrific collection that stands easily on its own, but it's all the more stunning that Abrams is able to borrow from far-flung musical cultures without ever infringing upon any of them."

Grayson Haver Currin of Pitchfork commented: "As Abrams and his crew of Chicago cohorts gain steam without abandoning their simple, looping structures, it feels like we're catching a glimpse of a potentially eternal performance... Represencing rarely sounds overloaded or messy. Much of it could even be called minimal, more about small parts and subtle changes than loud, broad turns."

Writing for Tiny Mix Tapes, Clifford Allen described the album as "a fascinating and evocative set of transient contemporary improvisation that renders boundaries of time, place, and subculture only obliquely relevant." He remarked: "Represencing is not about specific representation or reference, instead conjuring vibrations of personalized otherness. It is music built through traveling, listening, and collaborating... it is work of open minds and open hearts, drawing from collective experience."

In a review for Consequence, Adam Kivel wrote: "Abrams assembles some of the city's best improvisers to work over the guimbri, but that droning beauty always lies at the core... Represencing is the kind of album that effaces the reality that you know exists outside of it, returning you to a time and place in which this sort of ritual trance focuses life."

Bill Meyer of Magnet Magazine included the album in his "Best of 2012: Jazz/Improv" list.

== Track listing ==
Composed by Joshua Abrams.

1. "San Anto" – 4:01
2. "Represencing" – 10:23
3. "Moon Hunger" – 4:19
4. "Sound Talisman" – 5:51
5. "Sungazer" – 2:46
6. "The Ba" – 2:24
7. "Enter Mountain Amulet" – 1:41
8. "Cloud Walking" – 5:31
9. "Sound Talisman" (live) – 24:46 (bonus track on CD reissue)

== Personnel ==
- Joshua Abrams – guimbri, organ, synthesizer, harp, bells, harmonium, sampler
- Nicole Mitchell – flute (track 6)
- David Boykin – tenor saxophone (tracks 1 and 3)
- Jason Stein – bass clarinet (track 6)
- Emmett Kelly – electric guitar, acoustic guitar (tracks 4, 7, and 9)
- Jeff Parker – electric guitar (track 8)
- Lisa Alvarado – harmonium, gong (tracks 4, 7, 8, and 9)
- Tomeka Reid – cello (track 5)
- Ben Boye – autoharp (track 9)
- Chad Taylor – drums, gong (tracks 1 and 2)
- Mikel Avery – drums (tracks 4 and 5)
- Frank Rosaly – drums (track 9)
- Michael Zerang – tambourine (track 8)
