= Mandatory Reality =

Studio album by Joshua Abrams and Natural Information Society
- Released: April 12, 2019
- Recorded: June 11, 2017
- Studio: Electrical Audio, Chicago, Illinois
- Genre: Free jazz, minimalism
- Label: Eremite; Aguirre Records
- Producer: Joshua Abrams, Michael Ehlers

Natural Information Society chronology
Simultonality (2017)	Mandatory Reality (2019)	Descension (Out of Our Constrictions) (2021)

Mandatory Reality is a 2019 album by guimbri player Joshua Abrams and the Natural Information Society.

== Background ==
Featuring two long pieces totalling over an hour in duration, followed by two shorter works, the album was recorded on June 11, 2017, at Electrical Audio in Chicago, with each piece captured as a single take. It was released on April 12, 2019, on vinyl and CD by Eremite Records, based in the United States, and on vinyl by Aguirre Records, a Belgian label. On the album, Abrams is joined by saxophonist Nick Mazzarella, bass clarinetist Jason Stein, cornetist Ben Lamar Gay, pianist Ben Boye, harmonium player Lisa Alvarado, and percussionists Mikel Patrick Avery and Hamid Drake.

In an interview with Jason P. Woodbury of Aquarium Drunkard, Abrams suggested that the music attempts to combine aspects of jazz and minimalism. He commented: "You often see collaborations between various figures—Don Cherry and Terry Riley, Harold Budd and Marion Brown. It's kind of shining a light on those connections, which are for whatever reason considered a little more separate." Regarding the longer pieces, he stated that they "give the musicians the opportunity to slow down, to try and take the approach of savoring what we're building together... If we can get to that space, you notice the focus broadens and zooms in at the same time."

== Reception ==
Professional ratings
Review scores
Source	Rating
DownBeat	4/5 stars
Jazzwise	4/5 stars
Pitchfork	7.7/10 stars
PopMatters	7/10 stars
Tom Hull – on the Web	B+

In a review for DownBeat, Aaron Cohen stated that the musicians know "how much power comes through movements that might at first appear sparse, but take on stunning resonance with each added layer.... they emphasize minimalism over complex harmonic changes and favor a series of subtle sonic shifts over virtuoso solos."

Giovanni Russonello of The New York Times singled out the track titled "In Memory's Prism" for praise, writing: "It all has the implacable momentum of migration, or the feeling of a big new idea just coming into being. At the very least, it will put your mind in a place of peaceful wandering; by the end, you're likely to wind up deep in your own imagination, remembering or inventing a story of your own."

Commenting on the second track, "Finite," The Washington Post's Chris Richards noted: "Abrams gently draws his seven comrades... into a groove that instantly feels like it's spinning, but with enchanted slowness... all of this is being done with human hands and human breath. No electricity. It's beautiful."

Writing for Jazzwise, Daniel Spicer called the music "spiritually charged ecstatic minimalism," and remarked: "Sincere, serious and deeply transporting in equal measure, Mandatory Reality deserves your attention."

Pitchfork's Andy Beta described "In Memory's Prism" as "exquisitely slow, like tai chi or a record played back at 16 rpm," and wrote: "It's so languid that you feel not so much like you are listening to a band so much as walking among them... The music moves so slowly as to impart the notion that this sense of pause, of dilated attention, might itself be the mandatory reality, rather than the one that clutters our waking lives from every possible angle."

Spyros Stasis of PopMatters noted the presence of a "constant process of transformation" in the music, and stated: "As the ensemble moves from one track to the next, it feels like they are discovering something new about their compositions and ideas each time. It is this simple fact that makes Mandatory Reality such an enticing listen."

In an article for Aquarium Drunkard, Jason P. Woodbury commented: "the sense of possibility, space, and most importantly, freedom, makes Mandatory Reality feel like a balm in our hyperspeed times. We often don't allow ourselves the luxury of experiencing individual, focused moments. The music Abrams seeks to create not only celebrates the possibility of focus, but widens and expands its boundaries."

Composer Ben Vida described the album as "the sound of people together, doing something in real time that takes time to do." He remarked: "for as much hypnotic beauty as there is in this music, there is also something charged with risk—something that manifests from inexactitude, from not making corrections, and from the complete live studio take. This is the sustained breath of time shared and ceremony invoked."

Nilan Perera of Exclaim! wrote: "The music itself is measured and takes its time to breath in layered meters... While this release really doesn't break any boundaries, it's beautiful and doesn't demand much more than good feelings. In these times, that's no small thing."

Las Vegas Weekly's Spencer Patterson included the recording in a list of his favorite albums of the past 20 years, and stated: "Tones, glorious tones, at the nexus of jazz and drone. One can get so deeply lost in this."

Commenting for Point of Departure, Stuart Broomer noted: "Development... is incremental, sometimes microscopic; band and listener alike are drawn ever further into repeated rhythmic figures... When solos emerge... they rise through the network of patterns, barely varying it... it's illuminating work, seemingly eroding barriers between self and other, creating a kind of bliss. In listening to these piece, subjective experience expands, while the objectively describable manifestation of the music contracts to the vaguest description."

== Track listing ==
1. "In Memory's Prism" – 23:39
2. "Finite" – 39:50
3. "Shadow Conductor" – 12:03
4. "Agree" – 6:07

== Personnel ==
- Joshua Abrams – guimbri, flute
- Nick Mazzarella – alto saxophone, flute
- Jason Stein – bass clarinet, flute
- Ben Lamar Gay – cornet, flute
- Ben Boye – electric autoharp, piano, flute
- Lisa Alvarado – gongs, harmonium, flute
- Mikel Patrick Avery – gongs, tam-tam, flute
- Hamid Drake – tabla, tar, flute
