= Lisa Alvarado (artist) =

American painter (born 1982)

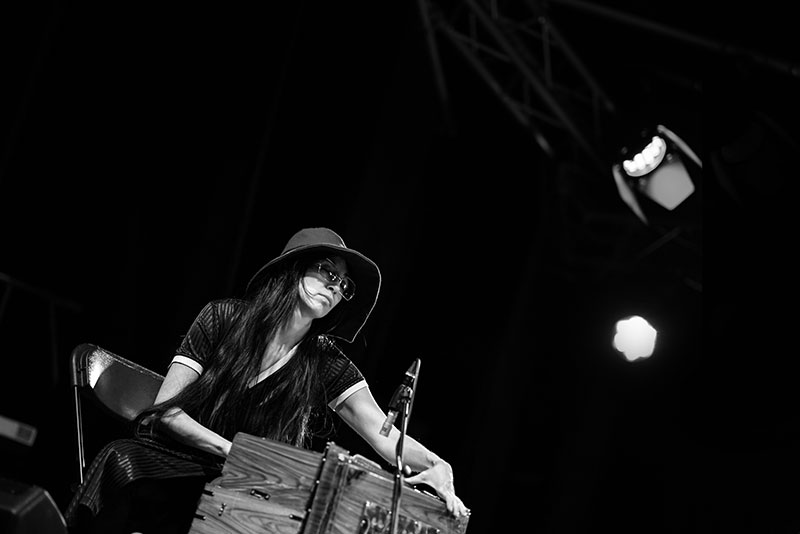
- Lisa Alvarado (2018) in Aarhus, Denmark
- Born: 1982 (age 43–44); San Antonio, Texas, U.S.
- Education: San Antonio College; School of the Art Institute of Chicago
- Occupations: Visual artist, musician
- Known for: Free-hanging abstract paintings, harmonium performances
- Notable work: Portable stage sets for musical performances
- Movement: Abstraction, multimedia art

Lisa Alvarado (born 1982) is an American visual artist and harmonium player. She is known for her free-hanging abstract paintings. Her works operate as stage sets and artworks simultaneously, and engage with abstraction beyond the parameters of western art history. Alvarado's paintings accompany musical performances as mobile setting for the band Natural Information Society, for which she plays harmonium.

== Early life and education ==
Alvarado was born in San Antonio, Texas to a Mexican American family. She studied at San Antonio College and The School of the Art Institute of Chicago. Alvarado joined the Natural Information Society in 2010.

== Artistic practice ==
Alvarado's practice bridges visual art and sound to create works that explore the possibilities and nuances of abstraction.

She began making her free-hanging works in 2010, as portable sets for the band Natural Information Society, an experimental ensemble of traditional and electronic instruments. Her two-sided works float between categories—they are at once paintings, screens and tapestries that create airy partitions, delineating pathways, evoking both theatrical and ceremonial uses.

Alvarado's hand-painted compositions consist of sequences that suggest foundational real-world materials: bricks, religious icons, single-celled organisms, the organic systems covering the natural information of life—things of which history and culture are formed.

Alvarado's works recall a number of traditions, among them Mexican textiles and European and American Modernist painting, however they build on those sources to become something of their own. Hybridity and in-betweenness are central to Alvarado's practice. Her work calls attention to the idea of mestizaje, which refers to the cultural and ethnic mixing in Mexican history, and is expanded to mean a mixing of ideas and materials as a way to resist or bridge cultural and conceptual divides.

== Exhibitions and performances ==
Alvarado's work is included in the Whitney Biennial 2022: Quiet as It's Kept, Whitney Museum of American Art, New York.

She has also exhibited her work at the Bergen Kunsthall, Norway; Institute of Contemporary Art, Philadelphia; Museum of Contemporary Art, Chicago; Bridget Donahue, New York; The Modern Institute, Glasgow; KMAC Museum, Louisville.

Selected performances include Palais de Tokyo, Paris; Pitchfork Music Festival, Chicago; Big Ears Music Festival, Knoxville; Rewire Festival, Netherlands; Institute of Contemporary Art, Philadelphia; Japan Society, New York; The Common Guild, Glasgow; Serralves Museum of Contemporary Art, Portugal.

Alvarado is represented by Bridget Donahue in New York.

== Discography ==
with Joshua Abrams & Natural Information Society

- Natural Information (Eremite Records MTE-61, 2014)
- Represencing (Eremite Records MTE-58, 2012; MTE-62, 2014)
- Magnetoception (Eremite Records MTE-63/64, 2015)
- Automaginary (Drag City, 2015), Natural Information Society and Bitchin Bajas
- Simultonality (Eremite Records MTE-68, 2017)
- Mandatory Reality (Eremite Records MTE-70/71 x2LP, 2019)
- descension (Out of Our Constrictions) (Eremite Records MTE-74/75, x2LP, 2021), Natural Information Society with Evan Parker
- Since Time Is Gravity (Eremite Records MTE-78/79, x2LP, 2023), Natural Information Society with Ari Brown
