= Descension (Out of Our Constrictions) =

Live album by Natural Information Society with Evan Parker
- Released: April 16, 2021
- Recorded: July 9, 2019
- Venue: Cafe Oto, London
- Genre: Free jazz, minimalism
- Length: 1:14:26
- Label: Eremite; MTE-74/75; Aguirre Records; ZORN74
- Producer: Joshua Abrams, Michael Ehlers

Natural Information Society chronology
Mandatory Reality (2019)	Descension (Out of Our Constrictions) (2021)	Since Time Is Gravity (2023)

Descension (Out of Our Constrictions) is a live album by Natural Information Society, featuring guimbri player Joshua Abrams, bass clarinetist Jason Stein, harmonium player Lisa Alvarado, drummer Mikel Patrick Avery, and special guest soprano saxophonist Evan Parker. It was recorded on July 9, 2019, at Cafe Oto in London, and was released on April 16, 2021, by both Eremite Records, based in the United States, and Aguirre Records, a Belgian label.

== Reception ==
Professional ratings
Review scores
Source	Rating
AllMusic	4.5/5 stars
The Free Jazz Collective	5/5 stars
Pitchfork	7.5/10 stars
Tom Hull – on the Web	B+

In a review for AllMusic, Thom Jurek wrote: "While NIS has gratified listeners and live audiences with their intricate meld of jazz, folk styles, and polyrhythmic improvisations drawn from a variety of world music traditions, this proceeding is unlike anything else in their catalog. Descension exists in the ecstatic sonic terrain between 21st century Western raga, free jazz, and a rave-like party album... a collaboration for the ages: It is ecstatic, improvised jazz that reverberates inside the human body like a heartbeat."

The Washington Post's Chris Richards stated that the album "sounds like life, as if the band's signature groove might be a growing, changing, living, breathing thing," and commented: "everything about it feels brisk and circular, moving quickly, but changing slowly, which makes time feel thin and thick all at once."

Brad Cohan of JazzTimes described the album as "an epic meeting of the minds... nothing short of pure improvisatory magic," and remarked: "Channeling the righteous uplift of Coltrane's touchstone 'Spiritual,' NIS and Parker dance, dart, and leap with melodious fervor... Whoever thought of teaming [Parker] with Natural Information Society hit it out of the park."

Writing for Pitchfork, Andy Beta noted that the music explores "the outer edges of the ecstatic as well as the physically exhausting," and wrote: "Both journey and landscape, the piece lifts off and soars to maximum cruising altitude, where, even at top speed, it seems to stand completely still—and then, over an hour later, you're on the other side."

In an article for The Free Jazz Collective, Anthony Simon commented: "While listening to this album—I've danced around the room, been dumbstruck by virtuosic soloing, become spiritually uplifted, fallen into a reverie, and felt relief when the band briefly landed on a simpler and more grounded sequence, stabilized by the steady guimbri of Abrams... and then, inevitably, even ceremoniously, the euphoric cycle began again. It's been a deeply rewarding journey."

The Chicago Reader's Bill Meyer stated that the album is "effective... at inducing an ecstatic state," and remarked: "While NIS are quite capable of evoking rapture on their own, the intricate and astoundingly lengthy lines that Parker threads through their playing put the music over the top."

Tyler Wilcox of Aquarium Drunkard wrote: "By the time descension whirls and swirls to the finish line, you may feel exhausted by its sheer intensity. But a few minutes later you'll likely find yourself pressing play on it again."

Commenting for Point of Departure, Stuart Broomer called the album "a performance of extraordinary power and vision," and suggested that it possesses "an uncanny symmetry, the wavering tones of soprano saxophone and bass clarinet, a rhythm driven by Avery and the insistent yet evolving ostinato of the guimbri, the interweaving modal figurations of horns and harmonium, sometimes even in the same register, with Parker's special mastery of soprano overtones creating the illusion of still other voices, impossible phantoms of a freedom beyond time and causality."

== Track listing ==
1. "I" – 17:31
2. "II" – 19:36
3. "III" – 17:27
4. "IV" – 20:12

== Personnel ==
- Evan Parker – soprano saxophone
- Joshua Abrams – guimbri
- Jason Stein – bass clarinet
- Lisa Alvarado – harmonium, effects
- Mikel Patrick Avery – drums
