= Frank Rosaly =

American drummer

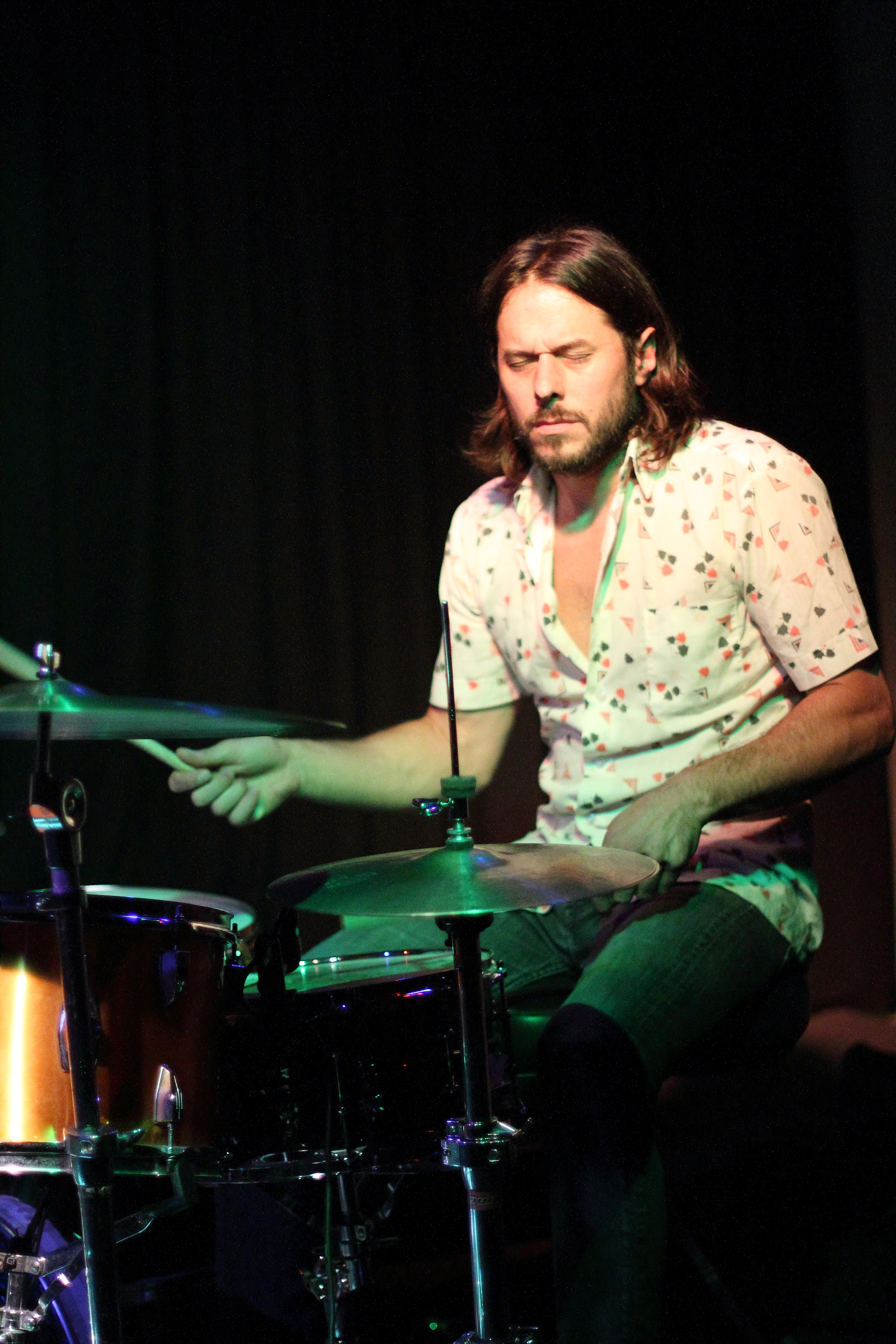
- Frank Rosaly performing at Club W71, Weikersheim.

Background information
- Born: May 30, 1974 (age 52)
- Genres: Jazz, Avant-garde jazz, electronic
- Instruments: Drums, percussion
- Years active: 1994–present
- Labels: International Anthem, Nonesuch Records, Delmark Records, Utech Records, Atavistic Records, Rune Grammofon,
- Website: www.frankrosaly.com

Frank Rosaly (born May 30, 1974) is a Puerto Rican-American drummer, composer, and sound designer associated with a transparent, compositional approach to drumming across various styles of music including jazz, improvisation, rock and experimental music. Rosaly also composes for film and theater.

== Biography ==
Frank Rosaly (Francisco Javier Rosaly Amorós) was born in Phoenix, Arizona in 1974. His mother Carmen Amoros was a secretary, his father Francisco Ramon was an accountant and served in the United States Air Force. He has one sister, Frances, who is a teacher. Frank graduated from Thunderbird High School in Phoenix, Arizona in 1992. He attended Northern Arizona University in Flagstaff, Arizona, where he earned a bachelor's degree in percussion performance. Starting out in the Flagstaff and Phoenix, Arizona music scenes, Rosaly relocated to Los Angeles and studied with Billy Higgins from 1998 to 1999 before returning to NAU from 1999 to 2000. It was in this time that Rosaly performed extensively with composer/bassist Joel DiBartolo in RJP which also included future Big Gigantic founder, Dominic Lalli.

Rosaly relocated to Chicago in 2001 where he performed in many ensembles and became deeply involved in improvised and experimental music. By 2013, Rosaly was awarded Best Jazz Musician by the Chicago Reader. In addition to performing and recording within the local scene and groups, Rosaly also produced the solo project Milkwork: A Study in Integration of Electronically Manipulated Percussion Instruments. Since 2004, he has operated the independent record label, Molk Records.

In 2016, Rosaly relocated to Amsterdam. He co-leads Ibelisse Guardia Ferragutti & Frank Rosaly's MESTIZX, and leads an electronic, improvised band, Ruidoscuro, a solo transcendental drumming project, Bimini, and performs with several Amsterdam-based ensembles. He continues to work with artists in Chicago, New York and Europe.

== Discography ==
Frank Rosaly:

- 2005 - One and Two (Molk)
- 2006 - Solo (Molk)
- 2008 - Puerto Rico (Molk)
- 2009 - Milkwork (Molk/Contraphonic)
- 2010 - Live at Experimental Sound Studio 05/30/10 (Molk)
- 2012 - Centering and Displacement (Utech)
- 2013 - Cicada Music (Delmark)
- 2013 - Viscous (Molk)
- 2015 - Malo (Utech)
- 2016 - Neolithic Extraction - The Malo Remixes (Utech)

Raging Jazz Project

- 1999 - Live Somewhere We Used to Know (Self-Released)

Shortbus

- 1999 - The Full Hookup (DBR, Inc.)

Design Flaw

- 2003 - Ends Meet (Future Reference)

Thread Quintet

- 2003 - Long Lines (Future Reference)

Tim Daisy & Frank Rosaly:

- 2006 - Boombox Babylon (Utech)

Keefe Jackson & Frank Rosaly:

- 2007 - Duo (Molk)

Dave Rempis/Frank Rosaly

- 2009 - Cyrillic (482 Music)

Christoph Erb, Fred Lonberg-Holm, Jason Roebke & Frank Rosaly:

- 2011 - Sack (Veto Recordings)

Jeb Bishop, Jaap Blonk, Lou Mallozzi & Frank Rosaly:

- 2012 - At the Hideout (Kontrans)

Aram Shelton, Fred Lonberg-Holm & Frank Rosaly:

- 2015 - Resounder (Singlespeed Music)

Aram Shelton & Frank Rosaly:

- 2015 - Sticks and Reed

Thurston Moore & Frank Rosaly:

- 2016 - Marshmallow Moon Decorum (Corbett vs, Dempsey)

Aaron Bennet, Darren Johnston, Lisa Mezzacappa & Frank Rosaly:

- 2016 - Shipwreck 4 (NoBusiness)

Shane Parish & Frank Rosaly:

- 2016 - Labrys (Cabin Floor Esoterica)

Fred Jackson, Stéphane Payen, Edward Perrud & Frank Rosaly:

- 2017 - Twins (The Bridge Sessions)

Christoph Erb, Jim Baker & Frank Rosaly:

- 2017 - ...Don't Buy Him a Parrot... (hatOLOGY)

Dave Rempis, Jasper Stadhouders & Frank Rosaly:

- 2018 - ICOCI (Aerophonic)

Tres Hongos:

- 2012 - Where My Dreams Go to Die (Molk)

The Luzern-Chicago Connection

- 2012 - Live at Jazzfestival Willisau (Veto)

The Young Mothers

- 2014 - A Mothers Work Is Never Done (Tektite)
- 2018 - Morose (Super Secret)

All Ellington

- 2018 -All Ellington (De Platenbakkerij)

=== As sideman ===
With Northern Arizona University Jazz Ensemble

- 1993 - The Year of the Cow (Walrus)
- 1994 - Herding Cats (Sea Breeze Vista)
- 1996 - Vintage Year (Sea Breeze Vista)
- 2001 - Sphinx (Sea Breeze Vista)

With Katie Haverly

- 2003 - The City (Self Released)

With Paul Hartsaw Tentet

- 2004 - Chicago 2004 (Metastablesound)

With Mandarin Movie

- 2005 - Mandarin Movie (Aesthetics)

With The Rempis Percussion Quartet

- 2005 - Circular Logic (Utech)
- 2006 - Rip Tear Crunch (482 Music)
- 2007 - Hunter-Gatherers (482 Music)
- 2009 - The Disappointment of Parsley (Not Two)
- 2011 - Montreal Parade (482 Music)
- 2013 - Phalanx (Aerophonic)
- 2015 - Cash and Carry (Aerophonic)
- 2017 - Cochonnerie (Aerophonic)

With Steve Dawson

- 2005 - Sweet Is the Anchor (Undertow)
- 2009 - I Will Miss the Trumpets and the Drums (Kernel Sound/Undertow)
- 2011 - Live at Simon's (Self-Released)
- 2014 - Funeral Bonsai Wedding (Kernel Sound)

With Subliminal 3

- 2005 - Decidedly Against Going (Beta:Sound)
- 2005 - Nervous Center (Beta:Sound)

With Boxhead Ensemble

- 2006 - Nocturns (Atavistic)

With Fast Citizens

- 2006 - Ready Everyday (Delmark)
- 2009 - Two Cities (Delmark)
- 2012 - Gather (Delmark)

With Matana Roberts

- 2008 - The Chicago Project (Central Control International)

With Fred Lonberg-Holm Trio

- 2007 - Terminal Valentine (Atavistic)

With Keefe Jackson's Project Project

- 2007 - Just Like This (Delmark)

With Who Cares How Long You Sink

- 2007 - Folk Forms Evaporate Big Sky (Sundmagi)

With Princess, Princess

- 2007 - Kentucky Princess (Pionic)

With Jason Adasiewicz

- 2008 - Rolldown (482 Music)
- 2009 - Varmint (Cuneiform)

With The Flatlands Collective

- 2008 - Maatjes (Clean Feed)

With Never Enough Hope

- 2008 - The Gift Economy (Contraphonic)
- 2015 - The Gravity of Our Commitment (Milk Factory)

With Musket

- 2008 - Free Coffee at the Banks/Push My Heavy (Pionic)

With Ingebrigt Håker Flaten Quintet

- 2008 - The Year of the Boar (Jazzland)

With David Daniell & Douglas McCombs

- 2009 - Sycamore (Thrill Jockey)
- 2012 - Versions (Thrill Jockey)

With Fred Lonberg-Holm's Lightbox Orchestra

- 2009 - At the Hideout (Kuro Neko)
- 2009 - At Elastic Arts (Kuro Neko)

With Paul Giallorenzo

- 2009 - Get in to Go Out (482 Music)

With Jeb Bishop Trio

- 2009 - 2009 (Better Animal)

With Scorch Trio

- 2010 - Melaza (Rune Grammofon)
- 2011 - Made in Norway (Rune Grammofon)

With Josh Abrams

- 2010 - Natural Information (Eremite)
- 2013 - Unknown Known (RogueArt)
- 2014 - Represencing (Eremite)

With Nick Mazzarella Trio

- 2010 - Aviary (Thought To Sound)
- 2010 - This Is Only a Test: Live At The Hungry Brain (Sonichla)
- 2015 - Ultraviolet (International Anthem)
- 2018 - Counterbalance (Astral Spirits/Monofonus Press/Spacetone)

With Karl E. H. Seigfried

- 2010 - Portrait of Jack Johnson (Imaginary Chicago)

With Jorrit Dijkstra

- 2010 - Pillow Circles (Clean Feed)

With Marketa Irglova

- 2011 - Anar (ANTI-)

With Joan Of Arc

- 2011 - Joan of Arc Present Oh Brother (Joyful Noise Recordings)
- 2011 - Lightbox (Joyful Noise Recordings)

With Jason Stein Quartet

- 2011 - The Story This Time (Delmark)

With Boris Hauf Sextet

- 2011 - Next Delusion (Clean Feed)

With Darren Johnston's Gone To Chicago

- 2011 - The Big Lift (Porto Franco)

With Ingebrigt Håker Flaten Chicago Sextet

- 2012 - Live at Jazzfest Saalfelden (Tektite)

With Matt Clark

- 2012 - Three:four Split Series Vol. 4 (Three:four)

With Josh Berman

- 2012 - There Now (Delmark)
- 2015 - A Dance and a Hop (Delmark)

With Iñigo Ugarteburu

- 2013 - For the Unknown (Foehn/Talo)

With Nicole Mitchell's Ice Crystal

- 2013 - Aquarius

With Pandelis Karayorgis Quintet

- 2013 - Circuitous (Driff)
- 2014 - Afterimage (Driff)

With Devin Hoff

- 2013 - The Lost Songs of Lemuria (Self-Released)

With Bradford/Gjerstad Quartet

- 2014 - Silver Cornet (Nessa)
- 2015 - The Delaware River (NoBusiness)

With Dave McDonnell Group

- 2014 - The Dragon and the Griffin (New Atlantis)
- 2015 - The Time Inside a Year (Delmark)

With Jason Roebke

- 2014 - Combination (Self-Released)

With John Dikeman

- 2014 - The Double Trio (Monofonus Press/Astral Spirits)

With Natural Information Society & Bitchin Bajas

- 2015 - Automaginary (Drag City)

With Ryley Walker

- 2015 - Primrose Green (Dead Oceans)
- 2016 - Golden Sings That Have Been Sung (Dead Oceans)

With Tim Stine Trio

- 2015 - Bios 1 (Self-Released)
- 2016 - Tim Stine Trio (Astral Spirits)

With Next Delusion

- 2015 - Next Delusion (Shameless)

With Hearts & Minds

- 2016 - Hearts & Minds (Astral Spirits)

With Josh Abrams & Natural Information Society

- 2017 - Simultonality (Eremite)
