= Simultonality =

Studio album by Joshua Abrams and Natural Information Society
- Released: April 7, 2017
- Recorded: 2014 and 2015
- Studio: Chicago and Montreal
- Genre: Free jazz, minimalism
- Length: 42:18
- Label: Eremite; MTE-68
- Producer: Joshua Abrams, Michael Ehlers

Natural Information Society chronology
Automaginary (2015)	Simultonality (2017)	Mandatory Reality (2019)

Simultonality is a 2017 album by multi-instrumentalist and composer Joshua Abrams and the Natural Information Society.

== Background ==
The album was recorded during 2014 and 2015 in Chicago and Montreal. It was released on April 7, 2017, on vinyl by Eremite Records, based in the United States, and on vinyl and CD by tak:til, an imprint of the German Glitterbeat label. Led by Joshua Abrams on guimbri and double bass, the group features tenor saxophonist Ari Brown, electric guitarist Emmett Kelly, keyboardist Ben Boye, harmonium player Lisa Alvarado, and drummers Mikel Avery and Frank Rosaly.

The title of the final track, "2128½", refers to the address of Chicago's Velvet Lounge, where Abrams was house bassist during the 1990s.

== Reception ==
Professional ratings
Review scores
Source	Rating
The Free Jazz Collective	4.5/5 stars
The Guardian	4/5 stars
The Jazz Mann	3.5/5 stars
Pitchfork	8.1/10
Tom Hull – on the Web	A−

In an article for The New York Times, Giovanni Russonello described the album as "at once tensile and hypnotic," having "an aesthetic of repetition and renewal," and noted that the music "draws on a global scrapbook of sources: the liquid chime of 20th-century minimalism, the trebly funk of guitar-driven jazz fusion, the burrowing pulse of West Africa's Gnawa music."

John Lewis of The Guardian called the album "a compelling Afro-futurist voyage," and wrote: "What holds everything together... is the spectral presence of Africa – with Abrams' goatskin-covered guimbri bouncing around the mix, sharing sonic space with resonator bells, bow harps and thumb pianos."

Pitchfork's Marc Masters stated: "The group moves together like a carbon-based machine, loose enough to allow for surprises but always focused on one goal... the music... coaxes you to quiet your mind and focus your attention, but it doesn't necessarily move slowly... Simultonality advances Abrams and Natural Information Society's signature sound, one that gets even more unique the further it grows and expands."

Writing for the Chicago Reader, Peter Margasak noted that the power of the group "is in large measure derived from a singular sense of purpose: to lock in on a single chord and with subtle, kaleidoscopic modality cast a spell at the nexus of a hypnotic groove." He praised the music's "shifting timbres" which are "built atop the twangy, cycling propulsion of the leader's thrumming guimbri lines."

In a review for Dusted Magazine, Bill Meyer commented: "Musical and elemental forces converge harmoniously without losing their essence. It's a soul-warming response to the agents of fracture at work in America and other places."

Commenting for The Jazz Mann, Ian Mann remarked: "Simultonality continues to find Abrams creating an increasingly individual music that binds disparate musical elements together in pursuit of a common purpose... Abrams has carved out a unique niche for himself and has surrounded himself with some excellent musicians as he pursues his artistic and philosophical vision."

Eric McDowell of The Free Jazz Collective wrote: "Given the niche that Abrams has dug out for NIS in the avant-jazz scene, it's not surprising that at the root of Simultonality's propulsive character lies rhythm, in particular the hypnotizing ostinati that ground Abrams's simple, sturdy compositions... it's the band's collective focus that accounts for the full unstoppable force of the music."

JazzWord's Ken Waxman stated: "Simultonality demonstrates that Abrams and NIS could easily be a high-quality groove band if it wishes. But like thoroughbred stallions that can be born as the result of careful breeding, the final two racks confirm that compositional and performance smarts exist to move the group onto an even higher level."

== Track listing ==
1. "Maroon Dune" – 9:05
2. "Ophiuchus" – 7:24
3. "St. Cloud" – 4:20
4. "Sideways Fall" – 12:11
5. "2128½" – 9:03

== Personnel ==
- Joshua Abrams – guimbri, double bass, bells, harp
- Ari Brown – tenor saxophone
- Emmett Kelly – electric guitar
- Ben Boye – piano, Wurlitzer, chromatic electric autoharp
- Lisa Alvarado – harmonium, Leslie, percussion
- Mikel Avery – drums, percussion
- Frank Rosaly – drums, percussion, bells
