= Unknown Known =

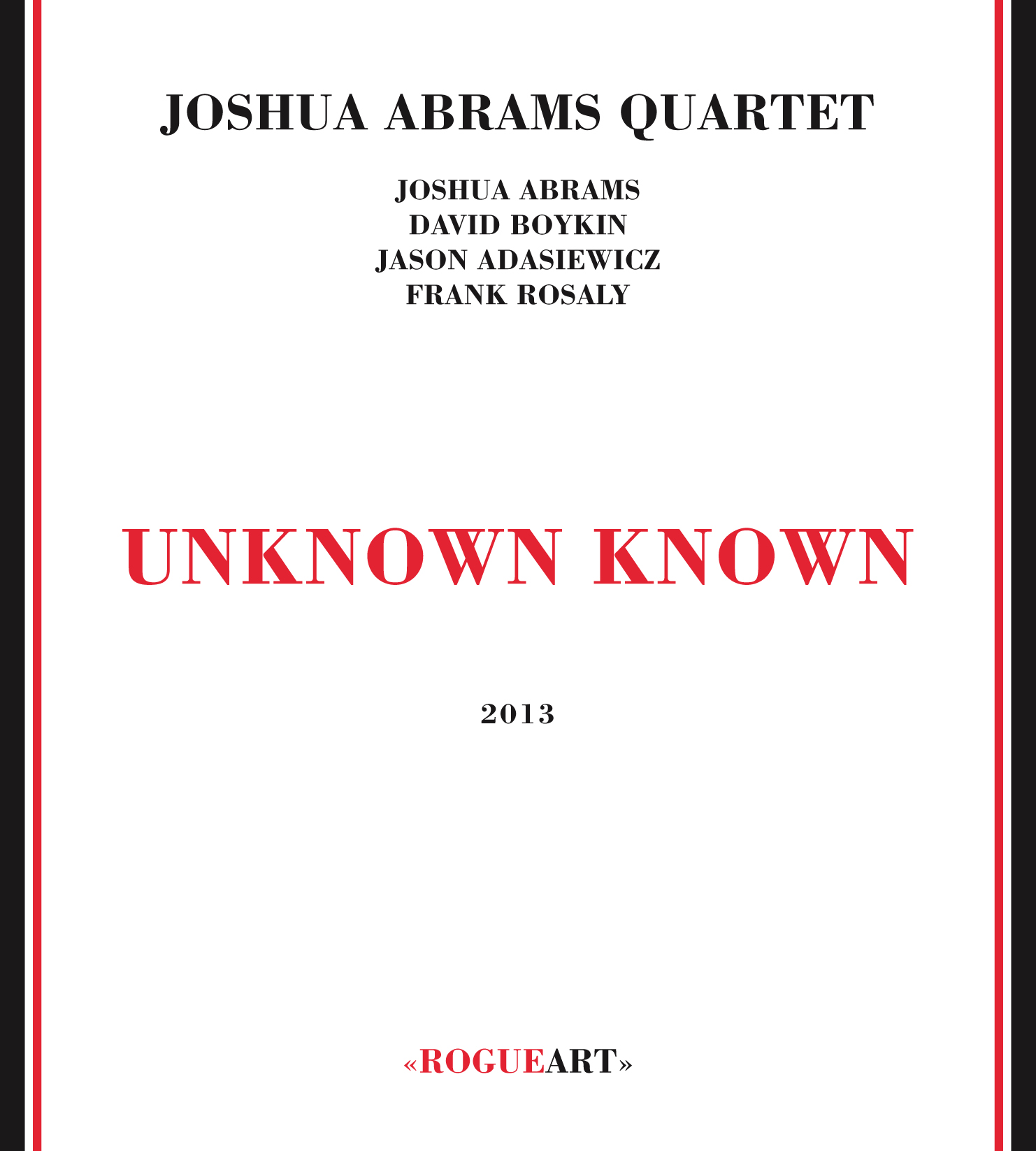

Studio album by Joshua Abrams Quartet
- Released: 2013
- Recorded: December 12, 2010
- Studios: Engine Studios, Chicago
- Genre: Free jazz
- Length: 49:32
- Labels: Rogueart; ROG-0045

Unknown Known is an album by the Joshua Abrams Quartet, led by double bassist and composer Abrams, and featuring tenor saxophonist David Boykin, vibraphonist Jason Adasiewicz, and drummer Frank Rosaly. Consisting of six original compositions by Abrams, it was recorded on December 12, 2010, at Engine Studios in Chicago, and was released on CD in 2013 by the Rogueart label.

== Reception ==
Professional ratings
Review scores
Source	Rating
All About Jazz	3.5/5 stars
DownBeat	4/5 stars
The Free Jazz Collective	3/5 stars

In a review for DownBeat, Bill Meyer called Abrams "a versatile instrumentalist," noting that "the intention here is to showcase [his] compositions using a jazz-rooted vocabulary," and stating that the track titled "Look Through It" "brings to mind the yearning way that the John Coltrane Quartet had with a ballad (circa 1963)."

David R. Adler of The Village Voice included the album in his list of "The 10 Best Jazz Albums of 2013," describing it as having "a brooding, luminescent side but also an allotment of ragged groove and swing," and writing: "The audio is just right, the writing fresh, the chemistry immediately apparent."

Referring to the album title, John Sharpe of All About Jazz stated: "in one sense, the procedure of improvisation is an attempt to unlock new things which we don't think we know. It's an approach which the bassist airs thoroughly on the six cuts which constitute this disc."

JazzWord's Ken Waxman commented: "Envision Bags & Trane if bassist Paul Chambers was leading the session and the program played was all his compositions. That's a simple way to imagine the achievements of this disc, although the most known unknown on this Chicago-recorded session is that without legend emulation, the bassist-leader and crew have created a high-gloss, well-paced CD that's comfortable (post) modern without being too experimental."

Writing for Dusted Magazine, Derek Taylor stated that the music is "anything but predictable or rote," and remarked: "The liners intimate spiritual overtones and intentions, but the music communicates just as well without those metaphysical underpinnings. This session echoes the musical culture of the city of its inception without being at all constrained by it."

In an article for The Free Jazz Collective, Dan Sorrells called the album "another reminder that the Midwest continues to be fertile ground for outsider jazz," and noted that "even in its wilder flights, it always has a foot planted in composition and structure. It's jazz that comes up under the tutelage of the AACM, which constantly pushed boundaries without ever entirely dispensing with them."

Peter Margasak of the Chicago Reader included the recording in his list of "ten favorite albums of jazz and improvised music led by Chicagoans" for 2013.

== Track listing ==
Composed by Joshua Abrams

1. "Unknown Known" – 7:46
2. "Boom Goes the Moon" – 11:11
3. "Settle Down" – 8:16
4. "Look Through It" – 6:22
5. "Leavening" – 12:11
6. "Pool" – 3:33

== Personnel ==
- Joshua Abrams – double bass
- David Boykin – tenor saxophone
- Jason Adasiewicz – vibraphone
- Frank Rosaly – drums
