= Cipher (Joshua Abrams album) =

Studio album by Joshua Abrams
- Released: 2003
- Studio: Riverside Studios, Chicago; Empty Bottle, Chicago
- Genre: Free improvisation
- Length: 1:07:17
- Label: Delmark; DG-546

Cipher is an album by double bassist and composer Joshua Abrams. It was recorded at two Chicago locations, Riverside Studios and the Empty Bottle, and was released in 2003 by Delmark Records. On the album, Abrams is joined by saxophonist and clarinetist Guillermo Gregorio, trumpeter Axel Dörner, and guitarist Jeff Parker.

== Reception ==
Professional ratings
Review scores
Source	Rating
AllMusic	4/5 stars
Tom Hull – on the Web	B

In a review for AllMusic, Thom Jurek wrote: "the sounds here... are living and breathing encounters with what lies just beyond the solo or group interaction. Interplay enters into language, and that language into silence. Strange, mysterious, and stunningly beautiful, Cipher is a modern enigma."

Derek Taylor of All About Jazz stated: "All four men are as adept at playing abstract sound patterns, as they are more conventional jazz structures... listener patience consistently pays strong dividends."

Coda's Duck Baker commented: "These diverse performers produce music that ranges from very outside group blowing... to moments of quietly sustained dissonance... Cipher should definitely be heard by listeners who want to see ways that the free improvised approach can be effectively combined with other ideas."

Writing for the Chicago Reader, Peter Margasak noted that the group "displays chamberlike restraint in collective improvisations, a long-tone vehicle in which the players add overdubs without hearing the previous takes, and loosely swinging compositions that recast the multilinear jazz of Lennie Tristano's late-40s crew using a modern vocabulary." In a separate Chicago Reader article, Bill Meyer remarked: "When musicians of discipline and intelligence get together, disparate elements can be fused into a marvelous equilibrium... The music they make together is a hybrid of chamber music and jazz in which every gesture is made with scrupulous care. No single player or idiom dominates the music; instead, every composition represents an isometric balance of different forces."

Ken Waxman of JazzWord acknowledged the musicians' "quirky mastery," and wrote: "Familiar with the ins-and-out of the improv tradition Abrams and crew are able to bring echoes of whatever they need to fit each tune."

== Track listing ==
1. "Mental Politician" – 9:08
2. "And See" – 7:02
3. "Nebb Nimaj Nero" – 5:09
4. "Cipher" – 9:45
5. "Calamities Break" – 4:21
6. "No Theory" – 8:16
7. "Background Beneath" – 5:42
8. "Space Modulator" – 4:43
9. "First Tune That Night" – 7:22
10. "For SK" – 5:49

== Personnel ==
- Joshua Abrams – double bass
- Guillermo Gregorio – alto saxophone, clarinet
- Axel Dörner – trumpet
- Jeff Parker – guitar
