= Magnetoception (album) =

Studio album by Joshua Abrams
- Released: 2015
- Recorded: February 2013
- Studio: Attica Studios, Chicago
- Genre: Free jazz, minimalism
- Label: Eremite; MTE-63/64
- Producer: Joshua Abrams, Michael Ehlers

Natural Information Society chronology
Represencing (2012)	Magnetoception (2015)	Automaginary (2015)

Magnetoception is a 2015 album by multi-instrumentalist and composer Joshua Abrams, on which he is joined by members of the Natural Information Society.

== Background ==
The album was recorded during February 2013 at Attica Studios in Chicago, and was released in 2015 on vinyl as a double LP set by Eremite Records. Led by Joshua Abrams on guimbri and double bass, the group features electric guitarists Emmett Kelly and Jeff Parker, autoharpist Ben Boye, harmonium player Lisa Alvarado, and drummer Hamid Drake.

== Reception ==
Professional ratings
Review scores
Source	Rating
The Free Jazz Collective	4.5/5 stars
Tom Hull – on the Web	B+

In an article for The New York Times, Ben Ratliff described the music as "mov[ing] in regular rhythmic paces and according to compositional direction, but slowly, with lots of contemplative space, and with modern and ancient instruments," and wrote: "it's patient, layered music that's always heading somewhere, sometimes spare and sometimes complex and shimmering."

Marc Masters of Pitchfork stated: "The members of Natural Information Society craft Abrams' songs like painters composing a landscape, or bricklayers constructing a building, with patience and devotion that values long goals over immediate gratification... There are hints of jazz, rock, raga, and many cultural musics, but it all feels singular."

The Big Takeover's Randy Reynolds commented: "Magnetoception is Earth music. It doesn't have a specific locale or grab from easily accessed niche genres. It is music that is living, persisting and actively developing: it's also one of the best albums of 2015."

Writing for Exclaim!, Bryon Hayes remarked: "It's easy to get lost in this music; the endless repetitive rhythms slowly burn their way through one's consciousness, binding with the listener at a deep level of existence... This music is spiritual, a set of vibrations meant to interlock with humanity's electrical thought impulses, designed to guide listeners to other worlds."

In a review for the Detroit Metro Times, Mike McGonigal noted: "the ensemble has locked into deep grooves and layered sounds that are nothing short of hypnotic. This music is uncategorizable in the very best sense, and seriously approaches visionary realms."

Dusted Magazine's Bill Meyer wrote: "Although the music is hypnotic, trance doesn't lead to easy bliss. The guitars add grit as well as languor, commanding sharpened attention rather than drift... It's not just a great set of grooves, but an antidote to the splintered attention of 21st century living." Meyer also included the album in his list of 2015's "best jazz/improv releases of the year" for Magnet Magazine.

== Track listing ==
Composed by Joshua Abrams.

1. "By Way Of Odessa" – 16:04
2. "Lore" – 13:15
3. "Of Night" – 2:32
4. "Broom" – 4:02
5. "Translucent" – v
6. "Of Day" – 2:09
7. "Magnetoception" – 6:03
8. "Spiral Up" – 9:53
9. "The Ladder" – 9:23

== Personnel ==
- Joshua Abrams – guimbri, double bass, celeste, clarinet, small harp, bells
- Emmett Kelly – electric guitar
- Jeff Parker – electric guitar
- Ben Boye – chromatic electric autoharp
- Lisa Alvarado – harmonium
- Hamid Drake – frame drum, tabla, conga, trap kit
