= Automaginary =

Studio album by Natural Information Society and Bitchin Bajas
- Released: August 28, 2015
- Genre: Free jazz, minimalism, post-rock
- Length: 41:42
- Label: Drag City; DC626

Natural Information Society chronology
Magnetoception (2015)	Automaginary (2015)	Simultonality (2017)

Bitchin Bajas chronology
Bitchin Bajas (2014)	Automaginary (2015)	Epic Jammers and Fortunate Little Ditties (2016)

Automaginary is a 2015 collaborative album by the Natural Information Society and Bitchin Bajas.

== Background ==
The album was released on August 28, 2015, on vinyl and cassette by Drag City. Natural Information Society, a largely acoustic ensemble, is led by double bassist and guimbri player Joshua Abrams, and features guitarist Emmett Kelly, autoharpist and keyboardist Ben Boye, harmonium player Lisa Alvarado, and drummer Frank Rosaly. Bitchin Bajas, using electronic instruments, is led by keyboardist Cooper Crain, and features bass clarinetist and flutist Rob Frye, and synthesizer player Dan Quinlivan.

== Reception ==
Professional ratings
Review scores
Source	Rating
AllMusic	4/5 stars
Pitchfork	7.9/10 stars

In a review for AllMusic, Paul Simpson wrote: "The album generally sounds closer to Bitchin Bajas' cosmic zone-outs than Natural Information Society's exciting bursts of energy, but that doesn't mean the album is a snooze... Automaginary is a fluid collaboration with both parties completely tuned into the same wavelength, resulting in a sublime blending of kindred spirits."

Pitchfork's Aaron Leitko stated: "Bajas and Abrams both find serenity amid perceived stasis—making music that sounds repetitive, but is constantly undergoing subtle scene shifts and mutations... Automaginary works because both excel at making music that feels thoroughly modern, but also ancient."

Marc Masters of NPR Music noted that, on the album, "the insistent, hypnotic pulses of NIS meld with Bitchin Bajas' drone-tinted layers like gentle rain falling from dense clouds." He singled out "Sign Spinners" for praise, commenting: "This airy, spacious music grows and grows without ever sounding cluttered."

Writing for Boing Boing, David Pescovitz called the album "stunning," and suggested that it will "launch you into the droney, pulsing minimalism pioneered by the likes of Terry Riley and Steve Reich but with a Krautrock edge."

In an article for HHV Magazine, Sebastian Hinz noted "the sheer joy of the mix between wild improvisation and restraint" heard in "On No Fade," and wrote: "For Bitchin Bajas, the collaboration is a blessing. It's as if they've let the stoned Genie out of the bong."

Colin Joyce of Spin included Automaginary in his list of "The 20 Best Avant Albums of 2015."

Author and music historian James Piazza stated: "It was an absolute delight to be introduced to a quality release which encompasses a trifecta of my favorite musical styles. From the first note, this triumph embodies all of the elements I enjoy in a composition."

== Track listing ==
No.	Title	Length
1.	"On No Fade"	19:24
2.	"Anemometer"	4:27
3.	"Tricks Me My Mind"	5:18
4.	"Sign Spinners"	4:31
5.	"Automaginary"	7:58

== Personnel ==
Natural Information Society

- Joshua Abrams – double bass, guimbri, small harp
- Emmett Kelly – guitar
- Ben Boye – chromatic autoharp, electric piano
- Lisa Alvarado – harmonium
- Frank Rosaly – drums
- Mikel Avery – drums

Bitchin Bajas

- Cooper Crain – organ, synthesizer, bass
- Rob Frye – bass clarinet, flute
- Dan Quinlivan – synthesizers
