= Guillermo Gregorio =

Argentine saxophonist (born 1941)

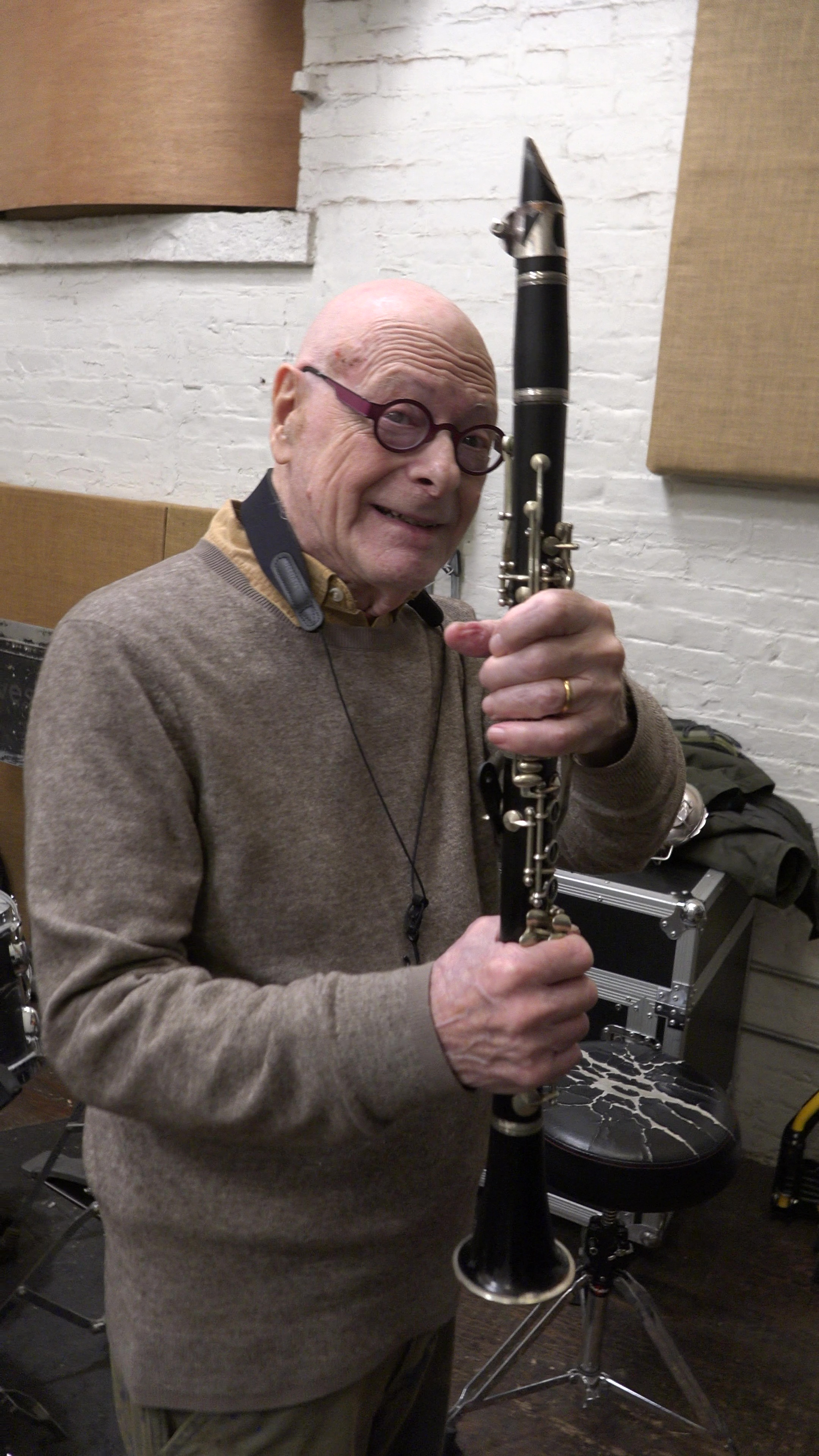
Gregorio in 2026 at iBeam in NYC

Guillermo Gregorio (born May 1, 1941) is an Argentine jazz and free improvisation clarinetist, saxophonist, and composer.

== Biography ==
Gregorio was born in Buenos Aires into a musical family. He became interested in experimental music in the early 1960s, culminating in his Unheard Music project (later released on the album Otra Música: Tape Music, Fluxus, and the Improvisation in Buenos Aires 1963–1970). In addition to his musical work, Gregorio also worked as a professor of architecture and as an author on classical and modern music avant-garde forms.

Gregorio also participated in the then Fluxus activities of the Argentine performance groups Movimiento Música Mús and other experimental groups in Buenos Aires and La Plata. In the mid-1980s Gregorio left Buenos Aires and moved to Europe, where he worked in Vienna and worked with Franz Koglmann; later he relocated to Chicago. Around early 2016, he moved from Chicago to New York City, where he lives and works today. In 2001, he founded the Madi Ensemble, with whom he further developed Argentine avant-garde styles.

He previously taught at Purdue University and had a work commissioned by the Chicago Symphony Orchestra. Since 1995 Gregorio has recorded several albums for HatHut Records, working with Carrie Biolo, Michael Cameron (musician), Jim O'Rourke, Mats Gustafsson and Kjell Nordeson. In 2001, Gregorio worked with a string quartet and the trombonist Sebi Tramontana. He also played in a trio setting with Pandelis Karayorgis and Nate McBride (Chicago Approach), and with Karayorgis and violinist Mat Maneri. His composition "Rodchenko Suite" was performed by Lou Mallozzi.

== Discography ==
- Otra Musica – Tape Music, Fluxus, and the Improvisation in Buenos Aires 1963–1970 (Atavistic, 1963–70)
- Approximately (HatArt, 1996)
- Ellipsis (HatOLOGY, 1997)
- Red Cube(d) (HatOLOGY, 1998)
- Background Music (HatOLOGY, 1998) with Mats Gustafsson and Kjell Nordeson
- Degrees of Iconicity (HatNOW, 1999)
- Cipher (Delmark, 2003) with Joshua Abrams
- Chicago Approach (Nuscope, 2007) with Pandelis Karayorgis and Nate McBride
- Window And Doorway (Driff, 2013) with Pandelis Karayorgis and Steve Swell
