= Since Time Is Gravity =

Studio album by Natural Information Society Community Ensemble
- Released: April 14, 2023
- Recorded: May 18, 2021; August 24, 2021
- Studio: Graham Foundation, Chicago, Illinois; Electrical Audio, Chicago, Illinois
- Genre: Free jazz, minimalism
- Length: 1:13:23
- Label: Eremite; MTE-78/79; Aguirre Records; ZORN99
- Producer: Joshua Abrams, Michael Ehlers

Natural Information Society chronology
Descension (Out of Our Constrictions) (2021)	Since Time Is Gravity (2023)

Since Time Is Gravity is an album by the Natural Information Society Community Ensemble, led by double bassist and guimbri player Joshua Abrams. It was recorded on May 18, 2021, at the Graham Foundation in Chicago, Illinois, and on August 24, 2021, at Electrical Audio in Chicago. It was released on April 14, 2023 as a double-LP set by both Eremite Records, based in the United States, and Aguirre Records, a Belgian label. On the album, Abrams is joined by alto saxophonists Nick Mazzarella and Mai Sugimoto, bass clarinetist Jason Stein, cornetists Josh Berman and Ben Lamar Gay, harmonium player Lisa Alvarado, harpist Kara Bershad, percussionists Mikel Patrick Avery and Hamid Drake, and a guest artist, tenor saxophonist Ari Brown.

Regarding the expanded "Community Ensemble" heard on Since Time Is Gravity, Abrams remarked: "There's a wealth of community we have in Chicago and throughout the world. There's room for everyone's personality and I want them to bring their sound to it... It's not like a classical aesthetic to make everyone anonymous to be unified... No, we unify with all our idiosyncrasies, warts and all."

== Reception ==
Professional ratings
Review scores
Source	Rating
All About Jazz	3.5/5 stars
AllMusic	4/5 stars
No Transmission	4.5/5 stars
Pitchfork	7.7/10 stars
PopMatters	9/10 stars
Spectrum Culture	9/10 stars
Tom Hull – on the Web	A−

In a review for AllMusic, Thom Jurek wrote: "Since Time Is Gravity returns NIS to their exploratory rhythm and overtone roots even as they make more room for jazz harmony and rhythmic sensibilities while highlighting the abundance of soloists among them."

Danen Jobe of All About Jazz stated: "Abrams calls this music ecstatic minimalism, but, had the word not been already taken by electronic music, trance works just as well... this is music designed to transport, to support movement between worlds, to sing the song of different spirits. Come hear what it has to say."

Pitchfork's Jonathan Williger described the album as "a suite of vivid snapshots of eternity, a concept that should be oxymoronic but which feels completely natural in Abrams' hands." He commented: "Abrams' music moves through time gracefully, adjusting to the demands of when and where it is performed, and who's involved. The awe that his music channels lies in its grasp of mutability, tracking subtle changes in repeating patterns—whether from moment to moment or year to year."

Writing for PopMatters, Bruce Miller remarked: "Natural Information Society releases have allowed featured players to alter the music sonically without compromising the pulse at the root of their output. Since Time Is Gravity may be a slightly more orchestrated version of that allegiance to a loosely controlled creative state. Still, the results are every bit as sublime as anything he and his partners in collective aural immersion have ever released."

In an article for Spectrum Culture, Reed Jackson wrote: "At one point in its early years, free jazz was called 'energy music' due to its frenetic pace, frenzied abandon and atomic volume; Joshua Abrams and the Natural Information Society work slowly, often quietly and with unrelenting patience – but the alternative energy they tap into might be more powerful than anything the Atomic Age gave us."

Dusted Magazine's Christian Carey stated: "Natural Information Society works well with this expanded complement. The inclusion of Brown is especially effective. Whether the new collaborators will remain, or others players will join Abrams, Since Time Is Gravity demonstrates that Natural Information Society is a durable creative enterprise."

Álvaro Molina of Post-Trash commented: "As a collective, NIS encompasses a lively, pulsating experience, coming from every instrumental angle. The 'slowness' and 'flow' of Abram's visionary leadership expands into every corner of the seven compositions... Here, music flows by itself. Slowly or rapidly, it has its own gravity, allowing for much more than time as we know it."

Writing for A Green Man Review, Gary Whitehouse noted: "Since Time Is Gravity is one of the more complex and nuanced albums I've reviewed in recent years... All fans of modern and ambient jazz, trance, and modal world music should definitely lean into this one."

== Track listing ==
Side A

1. "Moontide Chorus" – 6:41
2. "Is" – 11:39

Side B

1. "Murmuration" – 17:36

Side C

1. "Wane" – 4:30
2. "Stigmergy" – 13:05

Side D

1. "Immemorial" – 8:11
2. "Wax" – 3:19
3. "Gravity" – 7:53

== Personnel ==
- Joshua Abrams – double bass, guimbri
- Nick Mazzarella – alto saxophone
- Mai Sugimoto – alto saxophone, flute
- Ari Brown – tenor saxophone
- Jason Stein – bass clarinet
- Josh Berman – cornet
- Ben Lamar Gay – cornet
- Lisa Alvarado – harmonium
- Kara Bershad – harp
- Mikel Patrick Avery – drums
- Hamid Drake – conga, tabla, tar
