= Eremite Records =

- Founded: 1995
- Founder: Michael Ehlers
- Genre: Jazz
- Country of origin: United States
- Official website: www.eremite.com

Eremite Records is an independent American jazz record label founded in 1995 by Michael Ehlers, with early involvement from music writer Byron Coley. Ehlers was a student of Archie Shepp's at the University of Massachusetts Amherst. After college, he began producing concerts in the Amherst area, and Eremite evolved from those events. The label name came from an alternate title to the Thelonious Monk tune "Reflections": "Portrait of an Eremite". The label's logo, designed by Savage Pencil, is an image of a robed Joe McPhee playing soprano saxophone. Eremite organized a concert series in Western Massachusetts that ran through 2008 and produced roughly 100 concerts, including five Fire in the Valley festivals. From 1998 to 2018, Eremite managed a touring organization that arranged hundreds of concerts across North America for its artists.

Eremite Records' early activities emphasized music by first and second generation musicians working in the American and international free jazz traditions, including drummers Denis Charles, Sunny Murray, and Juma Sultan, saxophonists Fred Anderson, Peter Brötzmann, Kidd Jordan, Sabir Mateen, and Jemeel Moondoc, trumpeter Raphe Malik, and bassists Alan Silva and William Parker. Starting in 2002, Eremite collaborated with Peter Brötzmann to revive Brötzmann's personal imprint Brö Records. After relocating from Western Massachusetts in 2009, Eremite began collaborating with a younger generation of musicians, including multi-instrumentalist Joshua Abrams and guitarist Jeff Parker. In 2021, Ehlers began working with the Black Editions Group, Los Angeles, on Black Editions Archive, an imprint focused on previously unreleased works by Milford Graves.

Eremite releases have appeared in many best-of-year lists, including The Washington Post, The New York Times, The Chicago Tribune, The Wire, Rolling Stone, DownBeat, Jazz Times, and Aquarium Drunkard.

Concerning his involvement with Eremite, Sunny Murray stated the following: "This music has not established many real connoisseurs, men with quality and taste, so we get a lot of meatheads that are in control of the business... When a guy comes up, we're suspicious... we've... dealt with so many Frankensteins that we want to make sure this guy is not a Frankenstein... Michael's not a Frankenstein—Michael Ehlers, Eremite Records—he'll take a chance. And that's what made this business work, guys that took chances."

== Releases ==
- MTE-01 Jemeel Moondoc - Tri-P-Let
- MTE-02 Ellery Eskelin & Andrea Parkins - Green Bermudas
- MTE-03 Gregg Bendian - Interzone
- MTE-04 Assif Tsahar - Shekina
- MTE-05 Raphe Malik - The Short Form
- MTE-06 Christopher Cauley - FINland
- MTE-07 Tom Bruno & Sabir Mateen - Getting Away with Murder
- MTE-08 Jemeel Moondoc - Fire in the Valley
- MTE-09 Denis Charles - Captain of the Deep
- MTE-10 Trio Hurricane - Live at Fire in the Valley
- MTE-11 Sabir Mateen - Divine Mad Love
- MTE-12 William Parker - Through Acceptance of the Mystery Peace
- MTE-13 Raphe Malik - ConSequences
- MTE-14 Sunny Murray with Sabir Mateen - We Are Not at the Opera
- MTE-15 Glenn Spearman - First and Last
- MTE-16 Malcolm Goldstein - Live at Fire in the Valley
- MTE-17 Alan Silva & William Parker - A Hero's Welcome: Pieces for Rare Occasions
- MTE-18 Peter Brötzmann Die Like a Dog Quartet - From Valley to Valley
- MTE-19 Noah Howard - Patterns/Message To South Africa
- MTE-20 Jemeel Moondoc & William Parker - New World Pygmies
- MTE-21 Test - Live/Test
- MTE-22 Tom Bruno - White Boy Blues
- MTE-23/24 Fred Anderson Hamid Drake, Kidd Jordan, William Parker - 2 Days in April
- MTE-25 Marco Eneidi, William Parker, Donald Robinson - Cherry Box
- MTE-26 Alan Silva & The Sound Visions Orchestra - Alan Silva & the Sound Visions Orchestra
- MTE-27 Alan Silva & Oluyemi Thomas - Transmissions
- MTE-28 Jemeel Moondoc - Revolt of the Negro Lawn Jockeys
- MTE-29 Jemeel Moondoc and the Jus Grew Orchestra - Spirit House
- MTE-30/31 Jemeel Moondoc & William Parker with Hamid Drake - New World Pygmies vol. 2
- MTE-32/33 William Parker Clarinet Trio - Bob's Pink Cadillac
- MTE-34 Raphe Malik - Companions
- MTE-35 Hamid Drake & Sabir Mateen - Brothers Together
- MTE-36 William Parker & The Little Huey Creative Music Orchestra - Raincoat in the River
- MTE-37/38 Peter Brötzmann, Hamid Drake, William Parker - Never Too Late But Always Too Early
- MTE-39/40/41/42 Alan Silva - H.Con.Res.57/Treasure Box
- MTE-43 Jemeel Moondoc with Denis Charles - We Don't
- MTE-44 Marshall Allen, Hamid Drake, Kidd Jordan, William Parker, Alan Silva - The All-Star Game
- MTE-45 Sunny Murray - Perles Noires vol. 1
- MTE-46 Sunny Murray - Perles Noires vol. 2
- MTE-47/48 Fred Anderson, Hamid Drake, William Parker - Blue Winter
- MTE-49 John Blum - John Blum Astrogeny Quartet
- MTE-50 Khan Jamal Creative Arts Ensemble - Drum Dance to the Motherland
- MTE-51 Sunny Murray - Big Chief
- MTE-52 Solidarity Unit, Inc. - Red, Black & Green
- MTE-53 Joshua Abrams - Natural Information (LP)
- MTE-54/55/56 Juma Sultan's Aboriginal Music Society - Father of Origin
- MTE-57 Juma Sultan's Aboriginal Music Society/Joshua Abrams - AMS dub
- MTE-58 Joshua Abrams - Represencing (LP)
- MTE-59/60 Test - Always Coming From the Love Side
- MTE-61 Joshua Abrams - Natural Information (Deluxe CD)
- MTE-62 Joshua Abrams - Represencing (Deluxe CD)
- MTE-63/64 Joshua Abrams - Magnetoception
- MTE-65 Jeff Parker - Slight Freedom
- MTE-67 Joshua Abrams - Music for Life Itself & The Interrupters
- MTE-68 Joshua Abrams & Natural Information Society - Simultonality
- MTE-69 The Khan Jamal Creative Arts Ensemble - Drum Dance to the Motherland
- MTE-70/71 Joshua Abrams & Natural Information Society - Mandatory Reality (LP)
- MTE-71/72 Joshua Abrams & Natural Information Society - Mandatory Reality (CD)
- MTE-73 David Blue - Stories
- MTE-74/75 Natural Information Society with Evan Parker - descension (Out of Our Constrictions)
- MTE-76/77 Jeff Parker ETA IVtet - Mondays at Enfield Tennis Academy
- MTE-78/79 Natural Information Society - Since Time Is Gravity
