= Aquarius (Nicole Mitchell album) =

Studio album by Nicole Mitchell
- Released: 2013
- Recorded: November 7 & 8, 2012
- Studio: Riverside Studios, Chicago
- Genre: Jazz
- Length: 68:36
- Label: Delmark
- Producer: Nicole Mitchell

Nicole Mitchell chronology
Arc of O (2012)	Aquarius (2013)	Engraved in the Wind (2013)

Aquarius is an album by American jazz flautist Nicole Mitchell, which was recorded in 2012 and released on Delmark. It was the debut of her ensemble Ice Crystal, a quartet with vibraphonist Jason Adasiewicz, bassist Josh Abrams and drummer Frank Rosaly. The last piece is a tribute to saxophonist Fred Anderson.

== Reception ==
Professional ratings
Review scores
Source	Rating
Down Beat	4.5/5 stars

The Down Beat review by John Corbett says "Mitchell is a stellar composer, and while her work for a larger ensemble has revealed much about her musical personality, it’s nice to hear how she manages things in a cozier setting, where the written and the improvised fuse quite completely."

In a review for JazzTimes Michael J. West notes that "Mitchell spends much time demonstrating her flute tone at its brightest, with high pitches and enthusiastic swoops, while Adasiewicz takes the opposite approach, sounding dark and dim with his low, limited notes. Even so, the execution is masterful."

The Point of Departure review by Troy Collins says "Devoid of overarching conceptual themes, the ensuing compositions convey a fluid, freewheeling sensibility. Underscored by Abrams and Rosaly’s discerning accompaniment, the scintillating rapport between Mitchell and Adasiewicz conjures intimations of such legendary partnerships as Eric Dolphy and Bobby Hutcherson, or Marion Brown and Gunter Hampel."

== Track listing ==
All compositions by Nicole Mitchell

1. "Aqua Blue" – 4:04
2. "Today, Today" – 8:07
3. "Yearning" – 6:43
4. "Aquarius" – 8:02
5. "Above the Sky" – 6:48
6. "Diga, Diga" – 4:26
7. "Adaptability" – 8:38
8. "Expectation" – 8:00
9. "Sunday Afternoon" – 9:38
10. "Fred Anderson" – 4:10

== Personnel ==
- Nicole Mitchell - flute
- Jason Adasiewicz – vibes
- Josh Abrams – bass
- Frank Rosaly – drums
- Calvin Gantt – spoken word on 10
