= Joshua Abrams (musician) =

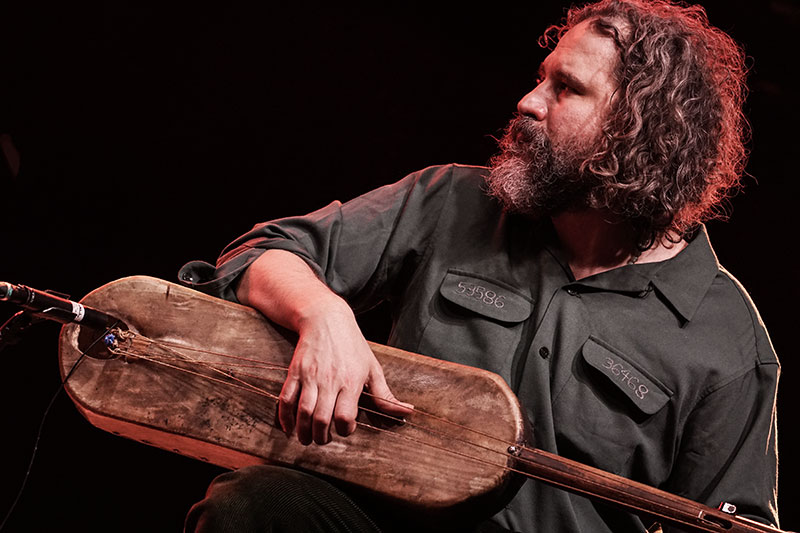
- Joshua Abrams in Aarhus, Denmark, 2018

Background information
- Born: Philadelphia, Pennsylvania
- Genres: Avant-garde jazz, minimalism
- Occupation: Musician
- Instrument(s): Double bass, Guimbri
- Years active: 1990–present
- Member of: Natural Information Society
- Formerly of: The Roots, Town & Country

Joshua Abrams is an American composer and multi-instrumentalist who plays the double bass and guimbri.

== Career ==
While living in Philadelphia in the late 1980s, Abrams was a member of Square Roots, a street music group that developed into The Roots. He moved to Evanston, Illinois in 1991, and played in Chicago house bands for several years before forming Town & Country in 1998 with Ben Vida, Liz Payne, and Jim Dorling. Abrams was the house bass player at Fred Anderson's Velvet Lounge and for several years he played a weekly club date with Tortoise's John Herndon and Jeff Parker. He was a member of Mike Reed's Loose Assembly and Nicole Mitchell's Black Earth Ensemble. In 2003, he played bass on Godspeed You! Black Emperor's album Yanqui U.X.O.. He has worked as a studio musician on recordings made in Chicago, such as Jandek's Chicago Wednesday; Bonnie "Prince" Billy's Beware and albums from Chicago musicians such as Joan of Arc, David Grubbs, and Sam Prekop.

In the early 00's, Delmark released his acoustic quartet album Cipher and Lucky Kitchen released his solo soundscape albums. He recorded albums under the name "Reminder" for Prefuse 73's Eastern Developments label and Easel. In 2010, Abrams started the band Natural Information Society releasing albums by Eremite Records. In 2018 he received a Foundation for Contemporary Arts Grants to Artists award.

As a film composer, Abrams has written music for director Steve James and for Life Itself, The Interrupters, The Trials of Muhammad Ali, Abacus: Small Enough to Jail, and the documentary series America to Me. He performed and composed music for the play At Twilight by Simon Starling, with Theaster Gates at Documenta 13, and in exhibitions by Lisa Alvarado.

== Discography ==
=== As leader or co-leader ===
- Terminal 4 with Terminal 4 (Truckstop/Atavistic, 2001)
- Busride Interview (Lucky Kitchen, 2002)
- Sticks and Stones with Sticks and Stones (482 Music, 2002)
- Cipher (Delmark, 2003)
- After (Lucky Kitchen, 2003)
- Shed Grace with Sticks and Stones (Thrill Jockey, 2004)
- Continuum (Eastern Developments, 2006) as Reminder
- Bright Blue Galilee with DRMWPN (Captcha, 2008)
- Bird Show Band with Bird Show Band (Amish, 2010)
- Twyxt Wyrd with the Cairo Gang (Blackest Rainbow, 2010)
- Stars Have Shapes with Exploding Star Orchestra (Delmark, 2010)
- Natural Information (Eremite, 2010)
- Represencing (Eremite, 2012)
- New Myth/Old Science with Living by Lanterns (Cuneiform, 2012)
- Unknown Known (RogueArt, 2013)
- Goes Missing with the Cairo Gang (God? 2015)
- Magnetoception with Natural Information Society (Eremite, 2015)
- Automaginary with Natural Information Society (Drag City, 2015)
- Simultonality with Natural Information Society (Eremite, 2017)
- We Have Always Been Here with Galactic Unity Ensemble (JMY, 2017)
- Excavations 1 (Feeding Tube, 2018)
- Ithra (Aerophonic, 2018) with Dave Rempis and Tomeka Reid
- Mandatory Reality with Natural Information Society (Eremite, 2019)
- Cloud Script (Rogueart, 2020)
- Sometimes There Were Four (self-released, 2020) with Forbes Graham, Ava Mendoza, and Tyler Damon
- Music for Life Itself & The Interrupters (Eremite, 2020)
- descension (Out of Our Constrictions) with Natural Information Society and Evan Parker (Eremite, 2021)
- Mind Maintenance (Drag City, 2021) with Chad Taylor
- Since Time Is Gravity with Natural Information Society and Ari Brown (Eremite, 2023)

With Town & Country

- Town and Country (BOXmedia, 1998)
- Decoration Day (Thrill Jockey, 2000)
- It All Has to Do With It (Thrill Jockey, 2000)
- Up Above (Thrill Jockey, 2006)

=== As sideman ===
With Joan of Arc

- Orchard Vale (Record Label, 2007)
- Boo! Human (Polyvinyl, 2008)
- Flowers (Polyvinyl, 2009)

With Nicole Mitchell

- Afrika Rising (Dreamtime, 2002)
- Hope, Future and Destiny (Dreamtime, 2004)
- Black Unstoppable (Delmark, 2007)
- Renegades (Delmark, 2008)
- Xenogenesis Suite (Firehouse 12, 2008)
- Aquarius (Delmark, 2013)
- Intergalactic Beings (FPE, 2014)

With Mike Reed

- Last Year's Ghost (482 Music, 2007)
- The Speed of Change (482 Music, 2008)
- Empathetic Parts (482 Music, 2010)

With Dave Rempis

- Aphelion (Aerophonic, 2014)
- Perihelion (Aerophonic, 2016)
- Apsis (Aerophonic, 2019)

With others

- Fred Anderson, From the River to the Ocean (Thrill Jockey, 2007)
- Bonnie Prince Billy, Beware (Drag City, 2009)
- Jeb Bishop, 98 Duets (Wobbly Rail, 1998)
- Brokeback, Field Recordings from the Cook County Water Table (Thrill Jockey, 1999)
- Rhys Chatham, Guitar Trio Is My Life! (Radium, 2007)
- Bobby Conn, The Golden Age (Thrill Jockey, 2001)
- Chris Connelly, The Episodes Durtro (Jnana, 2007)
- Chris Connelly, Forgiveness & Exile (Jnana, 2008)
- Ernest Dawkins, Un-till Emmett Till (DAWK Music 2009)
- Hamid Drake, Blissful (Rogueart, 2008)
- Hamid Drake, Reggaeology (Rogueart, 2010)
- Edith Frost, It's a Game (Drag City, 2005)
- David Grubbs, The Thicket (Drag City, 1998)
- Godspeed You! Black Emperor, Yanqui U.X.O. (Constellation, 2002)
- Marc Hellner, Marriages (Peacefrog, 2005)
- Icy Demons, Miami Ice (Leaf BAY 2009)
- Rob Mazurek, Sound Is (Delmark, 2009)
- Rob Mazurek, Calma Gente (Submarine/Catune 2010)
- Loren Mazzacane Connors, Hoffman Estates (Drag City, 1998)
- Makaya McCraven, In the Moment (International Anthem, 2015)
- Joe McPhee, A Pride of Lions (Bridge Sessions, 2018)
- Roscoe Mitchell, Three Compositions (Rogueart, 2012)
- Kjetil Moster, Ran Do (Clean Feed, 2017)
- Sam Prekop, Sam Prekop (Thrill Jockey, 1999)
- Sam Prekop, Who's Your New Professor (Thrill Jockey, 2005)
- Matana Roberts, The Chicago Project (Central Control, 2008)
- The Roots, Organix (Remedy, 1993)
- Savath & Savalas, Apropa't (Warp, 2004)
- Savath & Savalas, Golden Pollen (Anti-, 2007)
- The Spinanes, Arches and Aisles (Sub Pop, 1998)
- Mia Doi Todd, GEA City (Zen, 2008)
- Jenny Toomey, Antidote (Misra, 2001)
- Tortoise, Gamera/Cliff Dweller Society (Duophonic Super 45s, 1995)
- Ben Vida, Mpls. (BOXmedia, 2000)
