= Ben Vida =

Ben Vida (born 1974) is an artist and composer who lives and works in New York. He holds a Masters of Fine Arts from Bard College. As an artist and composer, he has been an active member of the international experimental music community for two decades with a long list of collaborators, projects and releases to his credit.

== Biography ==
Vida has performed as a musician in several bands since the mid 1990s. He co-founded the minimalist quartet Town & Country and continued to perform as a guitarist and trumpeter for the band. Vida was also a member of Pillow and Terminal 4 and recorded and performed solo as Bird Show and in the Drag City band Singer.

In addition to his musical endeavors, Vida has exhibited his work as a contemporary artist in recent years. His work has been performed and presented in New York at the Guggenheim, Audio Visual Arts, and The Artist’s Institute; in London at The Institute of Contemporary Art and The Royal Festival Hall as part of the Meltdown Festival; in Chicago at The Museum of Contemporary Art; and other locations such as the Sydney Opera House, Leap Gallery, Berlin, and Museo d’Arte Moderna di Bologna.

=== Other solo and two-person exhibitions include ===
2016

[Smile on.]. . . [Pause.]. . . [Smile off.], Lisa Cooley, New York

2015

Microramp Boombox, with Jeff DeGolier, Waterfront Gallery, Kingston, New York Slipping Control (West), 356 S Mission Rd, Los Angeles, California

2014

Damaged Particulates (Undersong Edition), Unsound NYC, Experimental Intermedia, New York. Travelled to: Cricoteka Museum, Kraków, Poland [2014]; Leap Gallery, Berlin, Germany [2014]

2013

Bloopers: #0, Performa Biennial, New York Metal Fatigue Music with Jeff DeGolier, NADA Fair Miami special project, Miami Beach, Florida Slipping Control, Audio Visual Arts, New York

2012

hy.morf.eld, Artist’s Institute, New York

Vida has been the recipient of several awards including the ISSUE Project Room Artist-in-Residency Commission; the Museu d’ Art Contemporani de Barcelona “Composing with Process” Exclusive Works Commission; Unsound Festival New Works Commission and a Swedish Arts Committee Travel Grant. Recent residencies include EMS Studios, Stockholm; EMPAC, Troy and the Clocktower, Manhattan.
