= Natural Information Society =

American musical group

- Performing in 2019 in Kongsberg.

Background information
- Origin: Chicago, Illinois, U.S.
- Genres: Avant-garde, Jazz, Minimalism
- Years active: 2010–present
- Labels: Eremite Records, Drag City
- Members: Joshua Abrams, Lisa Alvarado
- Website: naturalinformationsociety.com

Natural Information Society is an American music ensemble described as “ecstatic minimalism”. The group formed in 2010 and is led by multi-instrumentalist and composer Joshua Abrams. NPR called the group a "staple" of the underground music scene in Chicago. Their performances often include the paintings of Lisa Alvarado.

According to Musicworks, Natural Information Society's performances place "a singular emphasis on the human and the humane in music in the midst of a galloping digitized industry". The Guardian gave the group's album Simultonality four out of five stars, The New York Times described it as "at once tensile and hypnotic", while Rolling Stone named it to their list of the "20 Best Avant Albums of 2017". Pitchfork named their double album Magnetoception number 2 on their "Best Experimental Albums of 2015". The Stranger newspaper called the group's release Automaginary one of the "Top 10 Records of 2015" and it was also named by Spin as one of its "20 Best Avant Albums of 2015". The New York Times described their first album, Natural Information, as "one of the rough gems of the post-everything musical era”.

Natural Information Society's albums have been released by Eremite Records and a collaboration album with Bitchin Bajas was released by Drag City.

== Discography ==
- Natural Information (Eremite, 2010)
- Represencing (Eremite, 2012)
- Magnetoception (Eremite, 2015)
- Automaginary (Drag City, 2015), with Bitchin Bajas
- Simultonality (Eremite, 2017)
- Mandatory Reality (Eremite, 2019)
- Descension (Out of Our Constrictions) (Eremite, 2021), with Evan Parker
- Since Time Is Gravity (Eremite, 2023), with Ari Brown
- Totality (Drag City, 2025), with Bitchin Bajas
- Perseverance Flow EP (New Soil; Eremite, 2025)

== See also ==
- Music of Chicago
