= Bitchin Bajas =

American band

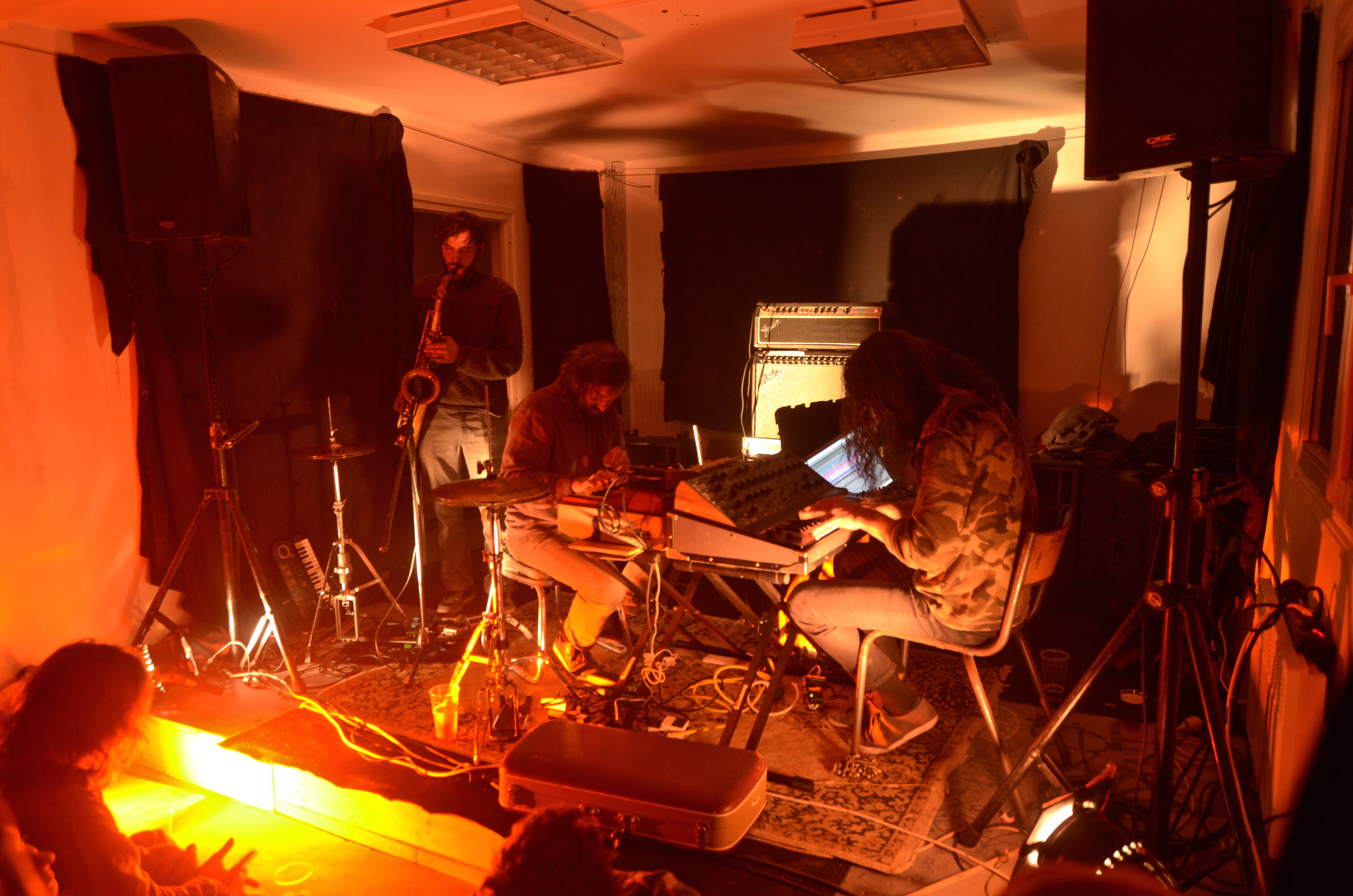
- Bitchin Bajas performing in 2015

Background information
- Origin: Chicago, Illinois, United States
- Years active: 2010–present
- Members: Cooper Crain; Dan Quinlivan; Rob Frye
- Website: www.dragcity.com/artists/bitchin-bajas

Bitchin Bajas is an American band operated as a side-project by Cooper Crain, who is also guitarist/organist of the Chicago band Cave. The other members are Dan Quinlivan and Rob Frye.

Their first album, Tones & Zones, was released in 2010.

They have recorded albums and performed live in collaboration with artists including Natural Information Society, Bonnie Prince Billy, and Olivia Wyatt.

Their music has been featured on a number of BBC Radio programmes.

== Discography ==
=== Albums ===
- Tones & Zones (2010)
- Water Wrackets (2011)
- Vibraquatic (2012)
- Bitchitronics (2013)
- Bitchin Bajas (2014)
- Automaginary with Natural Information Society (2015)
- Epic Jammers and Fortunate Little Ditties with Bonnie Prince Billy (2016)
- Sailing a Sinking Sea with Olivia Wyatt (2016)
- Bajas Fresh (2017)
- Switched On Ra (2021)
- Bajascillators (2022)
- Totality with Natural Information Society (2025)
- Inland See (2025)

=== EPs ===
- Krausened (2013)
- Transporteur (2015)
- Demeter (2019)

=== Singles ===
- "Bitchin Bajas" / "Moon Duo" (2010)
