= Aquarium Drunkard =

Online music magazine

- Website type: Online music magazine
- Available in: English
- Creator: Justin Gage
- Website: aquariumdrunkard.com
- Launched: 2005; 21 years ago
- Current status: Active

Aquarium Drunkard is an online music magazine based in Los Angeles, California and launched in 2005 by Justin Gage, who chose the name "Aquarium Drunkard" based on a reference to a lyric written by the band Wilco. Along with its music reviews, Aquarium Drunkard publishes a number of other digital content types on a wide array of musical topics, including podcasts, mixtapes, and artist interviews. Gage continues to write for the site, which now additionally includes articles from contributing writers.

The website was originally created by Gage with the intention of using it to share music with friends, but the blog quickly gained online traction: by 2006, it had reached a global audience. The wide success of Aquarium Drunkard and its growth in demographic allowed Gage to further pursue various backstage musical endeavors such as promoting specialty concerts, hosting radio and talk shows, and founding a number of production projects designed to give artists a platform to showcase their music.

== Related works and projects ==
- Since 2007, Aquarium Drunkard Show airs weekly on Sirius XM Satellite Radio.
- Gage founded the record label Autumn Tone Records in 2005.
- The podcast "Transmissions" was launched in [year needed] which aims to juxtapose in-depth interviews on all forms of art with discussion on experiments in sound collage.
- In 2011, Aquarium Drunkard launched the "Lagniappe Sessions", a regular recording series providing a platform for artists to pay tribute to their inspirations through a selection of musical covers. A vinyl format of these recordings titled "Lagniappe Sessions, Vol I" was co-released in 2016 as a collaboration with Light In The Attic Records; an independent Seattle-based record label whose founder Matt Sullivan is a personal acquaintance to Gage.
- In March of 2020, Aquarium Drunkard launched Radio Free, a segment which began as a curated 24/7 pirate radio stream. After an initial month-long broadcast extending into May, it returned in July 2020 in its present form: a reoccurring free-form transmission hosted by Dublab, airing in 4-hour segments on the third Sunday of each month.
- The debut episode of the Aquarium Drunkard Picture Show, a video program consisting of musical performances, animation, and found footage, aired on the Adult Swim simulcast on April 25, 2020.

== Influence ==
Throughout its publication history, a number of notable figures have publicly outlined the magazine; in 2009, English author Nick Hornby stated in an essay for The Observer's Music Monthly supplement that he listed Aquarium Drunkard among his six favorite music blogs. The Daily Beast included Aquarium Drunkard on a 2014 list titled "The Best Music Blogs," and Refinery29 has listed it in its 2017 article "19 Best Music Blogs That Aren't Pitchfork."

According to Rolling Stone, publicity gained from a post shared on the site popularizing a demo reel recorded by the band Alabama Shakes allowed them to sign on their first record deal.

== Awards ==
- (2009) LA Weekly's Los Angeles Web Awards', Winner: LA's Best Music Blog
- (2011), MTV's O Music Awards, Winner: Best Independent Music Blog
