= Sintir =

Moroccan lute

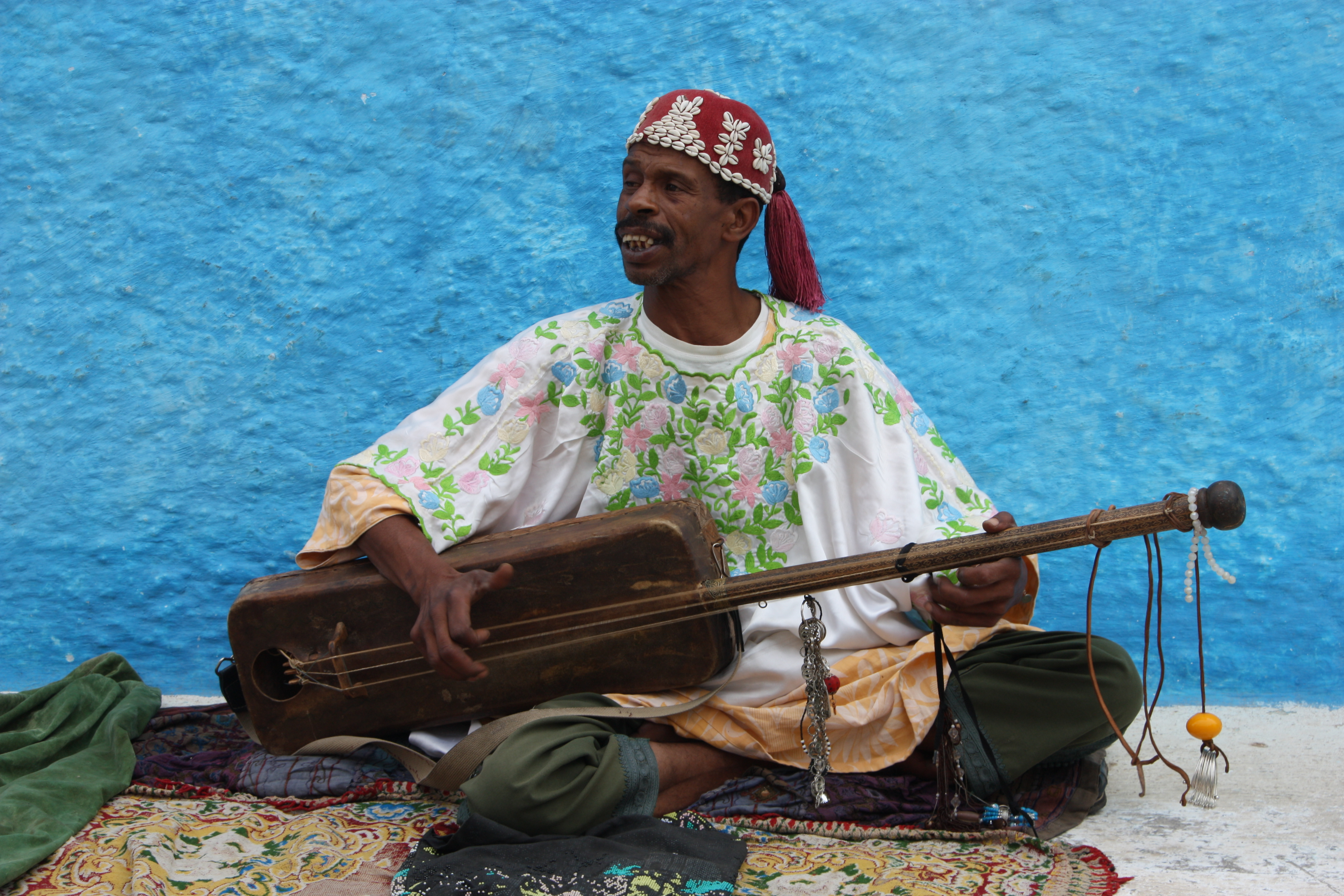
- Sintir player in Rabat, Morocco

String instrument
- Other names: gunbrī, gunībrī, gumbri, guembri, gimbri, hejhouj
- Hornbostel–Sachs classification: 321.33 (Tanged or Semi-spike lute: Chordophone, the plane of strings runs parallel with the sound table, the string bearer is a plain handle and passes "diametrically" through the resonator, the resonator consists of a natural or carved out bowl, in which the handle extends into but does not pass completely through the resonator)
- Developed: Multiple cultural influences; instruments show elements from Egyptian lutes (tuning rings and tabs) and folk elements of pre-Arab Africa. Possibly adapted further with Arab influence.

Related instruments
- akonting; garaya; ngoni; xalam

The sintir (Arabic: سنتير), also known as the guembri (الكمبري), gimbri, hejhouj in Hausa language, is a three stringed skin-covered bass plucked lute used by the Gnawa people of North Africa, mainly in Morocco (Gnawi music), Algeria (Diwane music), Tunisia (Stambeli music), and in Mali. It is approximately the size of a guitar, with a body carved from a log and covered on the playing side with camel skin. The camel skin has the same acoustic function as the membrane on a banjo. The neck is a simple stick with one short and two long goat strings that produce a percussive sound similar to a pizzicato cello, pedal harp, or double bass.

The goat gut strings are plucked downward with the knuckle side of the index finger and the inside of the thumb. The hollowed canoe shaped wooden body resonates a percussive tone created by knuckles slapping the camel neck top of the body while the thumb and index finger are plucking the strings. The lowest string on the sintir is a drone note and the second string, the highest in pitch, is tuned an octave higher and is never fretted. The third string is tuned a fourth above the drone. The buzzing sound often heard emanating from the sintir is caused by metal rings dangling off of a galvanized metal feather mounted on the end of the sintir's neck. The feather and rings vibrate in rhythm with the sintir.

The body of the instrument is hollowed out from a single piece of wood, and covered with camel or goat skin. The long neck passes through the top of the body and runs under the face, coming out through the skin near the base of the instrument, to serve as a tailpiece or string-carrier. The sliding leather tuning rings and the rattle-like metal sound modifier are commonly found in such West African instruments as the kora and the xalam (lute). The percussive playing style is reminiscent not only of West African technique but also of certain styles of American banjo picking.

As the sintir is used mainly by Gnawa (North Africans of Sub-Saharan African descent), it is likely that the instrument derives from similar skin-covered lutes of the region around Mali or other areas of the Sahel (such as the ngoni, xalam, or hoddu).

== Styles ==
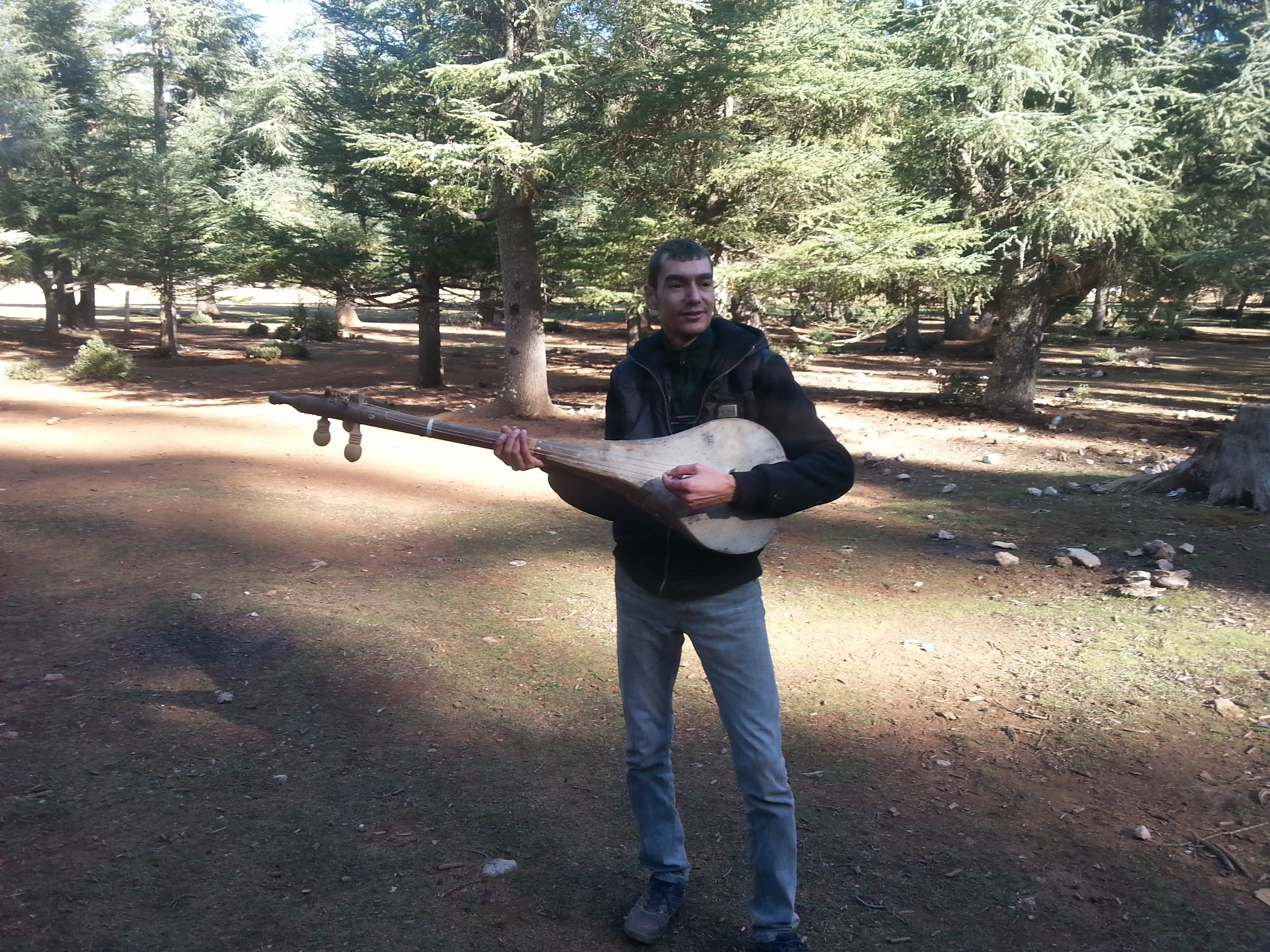
The Moroccan loutar uses a soundboard made of goatskin

Sintirs are usually applied to different styles of music:

Tagnawit: music of the Gnawa people. The guembri they use is the biggest: a long body, rectangular in shape. There is a hole in the skin at the bridge area for enhanced acoustics. Three strings are used, two that reach the end of the neck, and one that reaches the middle. The two strings are tuned in fourths and used to be fixed to the circular neck using a special knotting, although over the last decade standard tuning pegs for guitar or bass has become increasingly popular. How the strings stay in tune is a mystery has to do with the quality of the string, humidity in the air and making the braided leather strips holding the strings wet with saliva, so they don't move. The shorter string, which is also thinner, is tuned like the lowest string and is considered a drone string. Depending on the family, style or tradition there are different keys to the tuning. The most common ones however are C, F, D and G. When the Gnawa are clapping and not playing with the krakebs (a form of castanets), it is not uncommon to add a piece of metal that rings when the guembri is played (sersara). The plucking of the strings is done with the thumb and/or the index, and sometimes the player hits the body under the strings for a percussive sound. The Gnawa player who plays with the guembri is called the Maalem, the master of ceremonies. The Gnawa also refer to the guembri as hajhouj or sintir. The most popular guembri players in traditional and popular music are the late Abderahmane "Paco" Kiruche and Mahmoud Guinia- both from Essaouira - the brothers Ahmed & Mustapha Baqbou of Marrakesh, Abdelkader Amlil and Majid Bekkas of Rabat, and Hamid al Kasri originally from Ksar El Kebir in the north of the country, but for many years living in the capital.

Izlan s Tamazight: sung poetry by the Berbers of the Middle Atlas and High Atlas. It has a body the size of a lute or mandolin, but the neck is usually longer and thicker. Unlike the gumebri of Gnawa, this one has wooden tuners. There are usually four strings (although five is not unusual) tuned in fourths as well. Common tunings are A standard or C standard. It is played similar to a lute, however it has its own tonal range, scales and key progressions that are particular to the Berbers. The main artist plays the lute and sings, accompanied by bendir players and backing singers which can include both men and women. To the Berbers, this type of guembri is more widely known as loutar, although in the Jebala area it is actually called a guembri. Popular loutar players are Mohamed Rouicha, Hammou Oulyazid, Hajjaoui and Mohamed Mssmodi Al Hamadi and Maghni.

Malhun: sung poetry in Moroccan colloquial Arabic (Darija). It is similar to the loutar in shape, but much smaller in size. It is not used as the main string instrument; rather it is used to provide timbre contrast to the music. It is sometimes called guenbri as well.

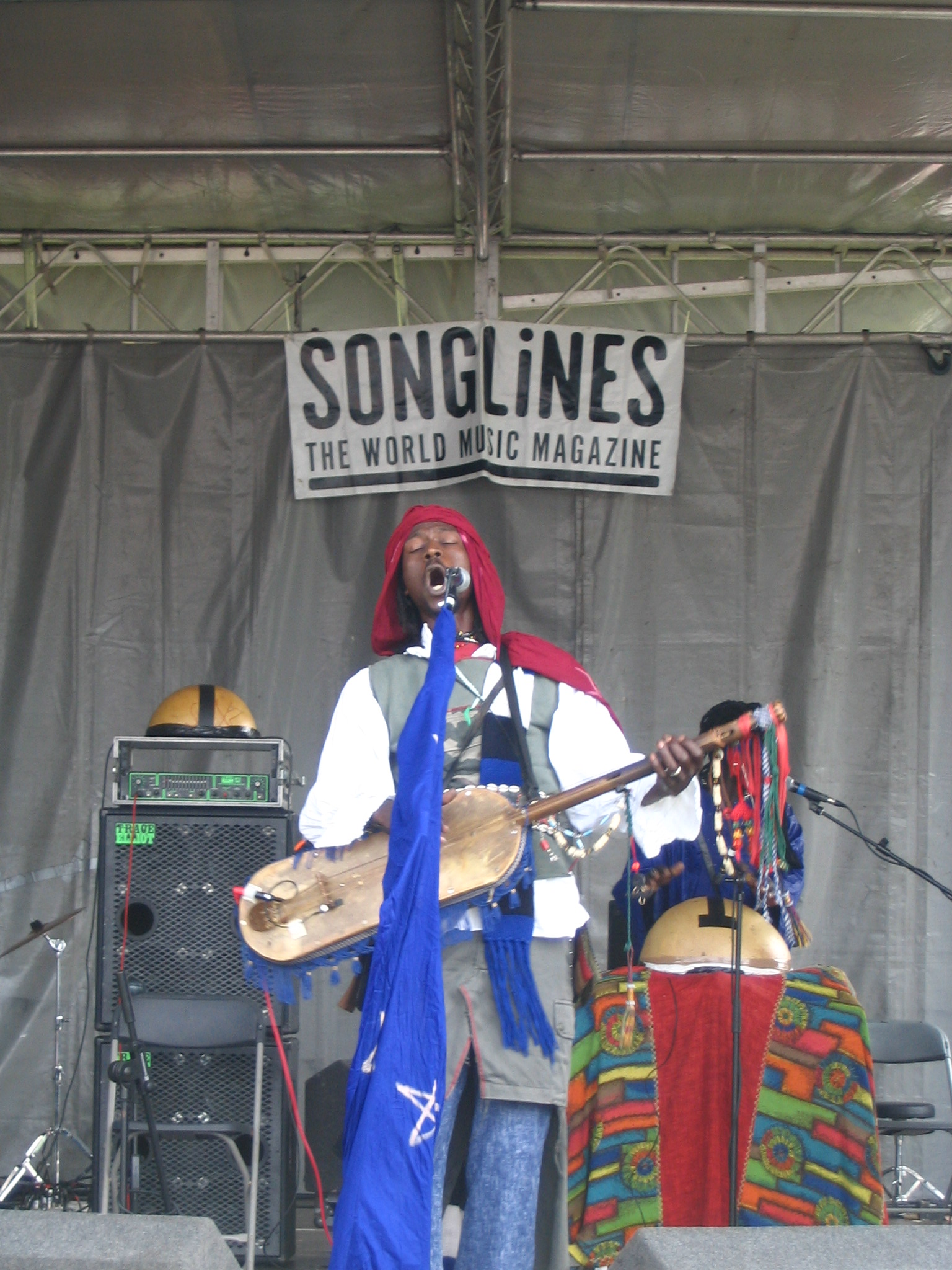
A sintir, or guimbri, being played by Nuru Kane

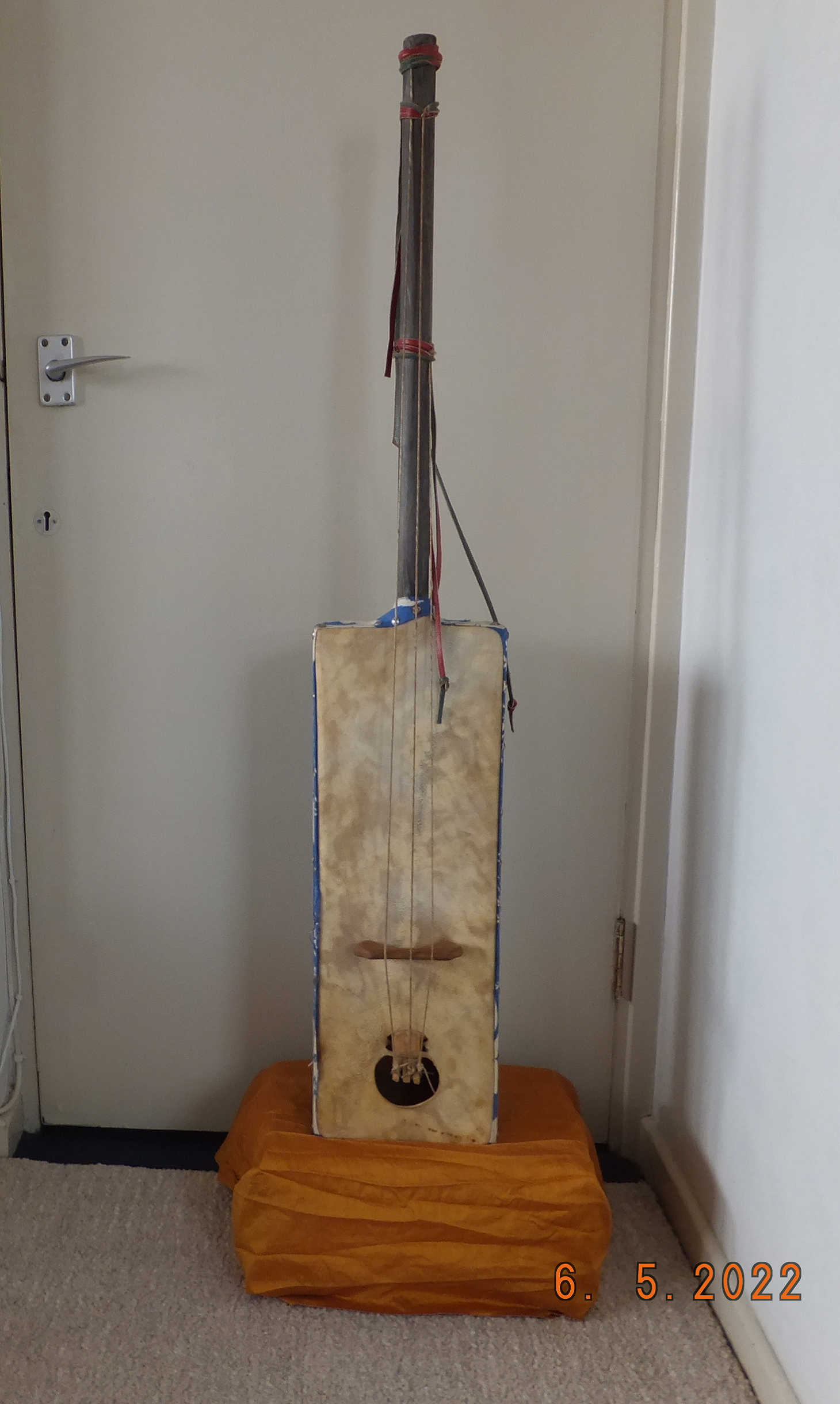
Moroccan Sintir (front)

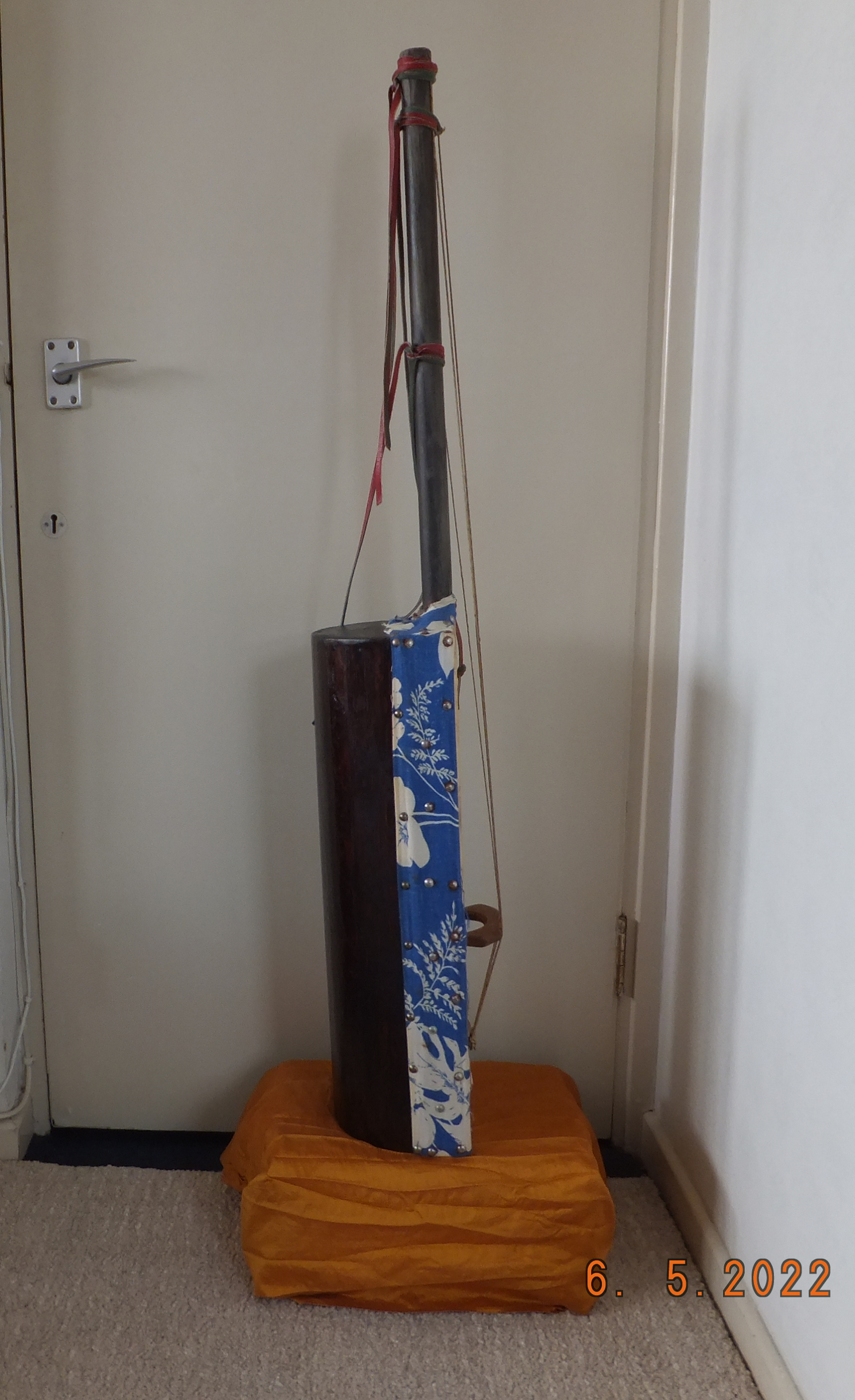
Moroccan Sintir (side view)

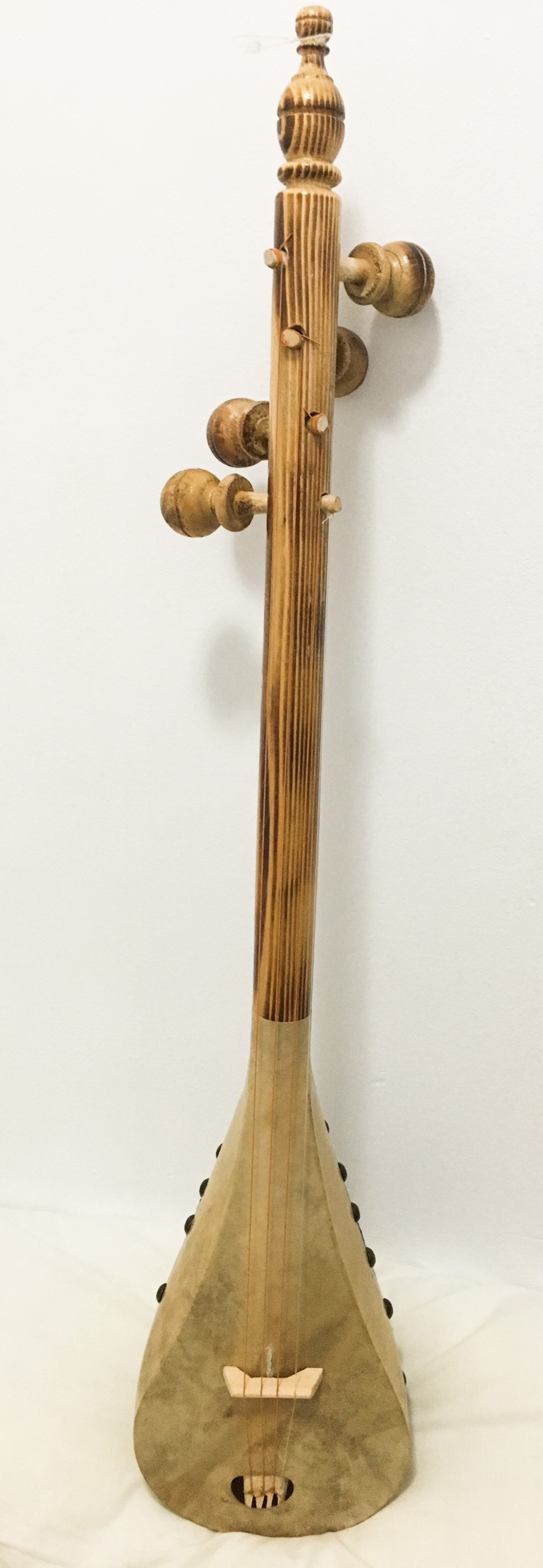
Lotar (لوتار), a Berber guembri

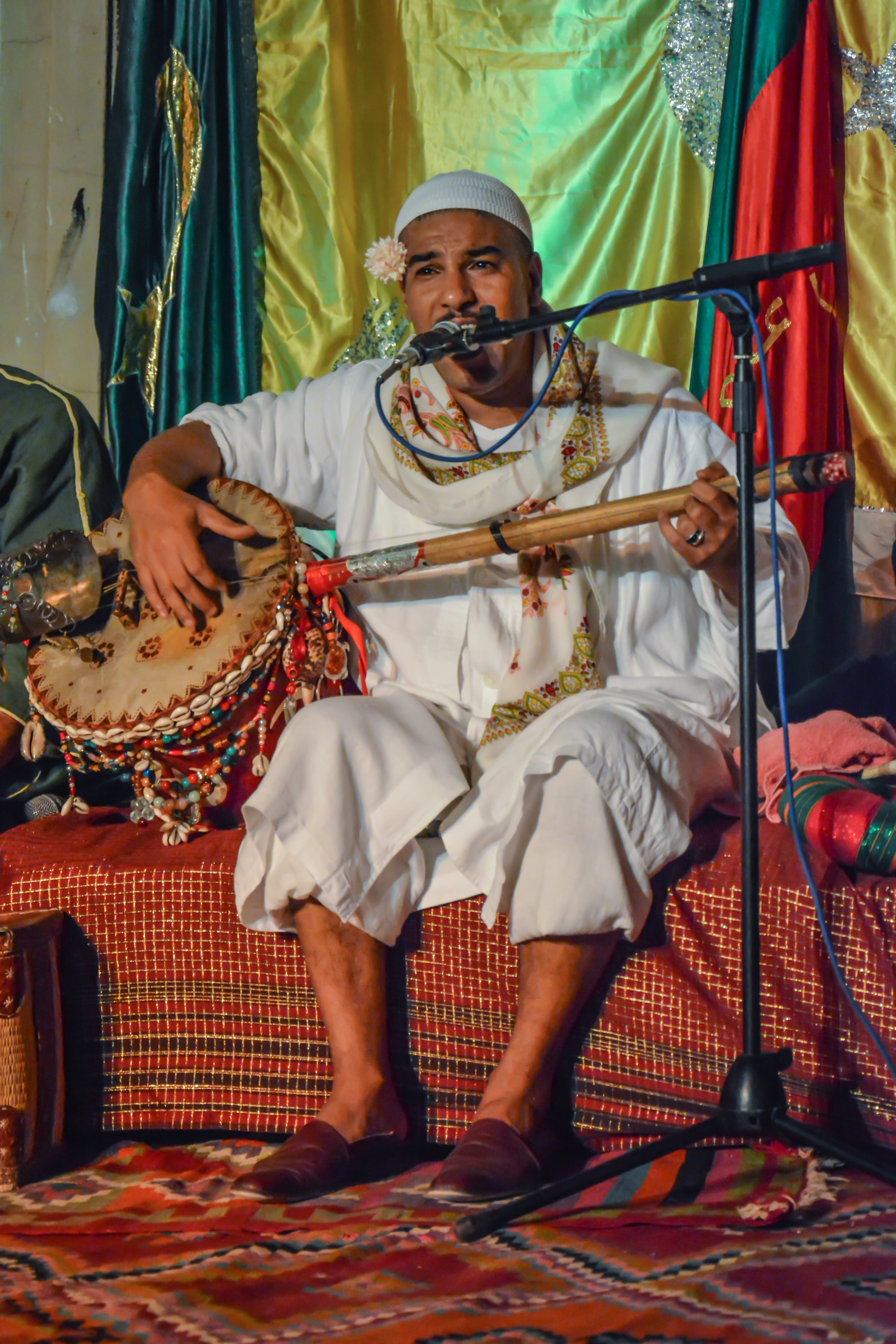
Tunisian guembri (الكمبري)

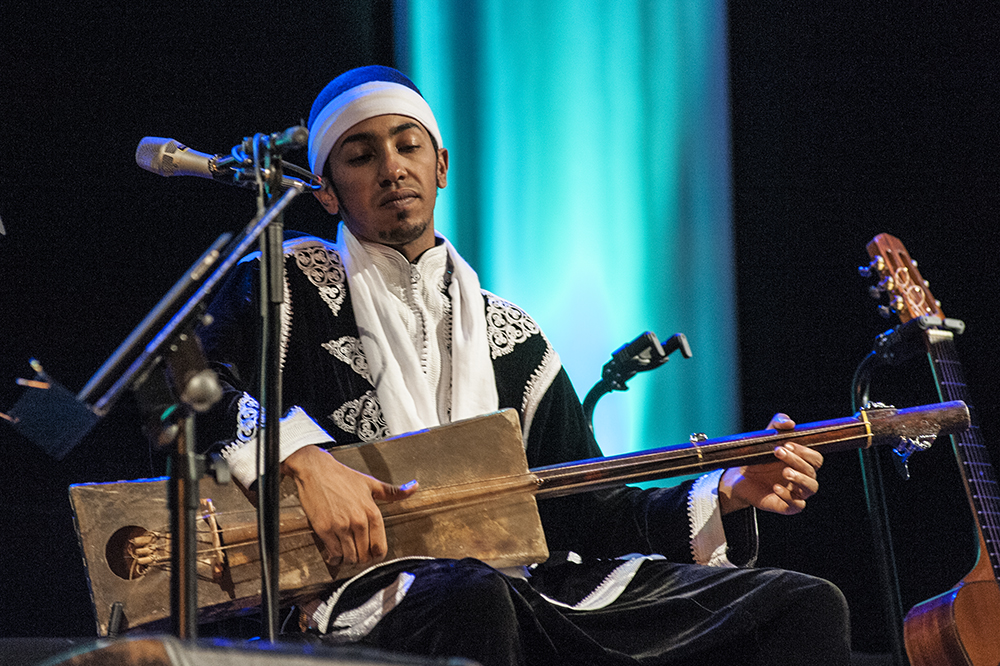
El Mehdi Nassouli from Morocco, playing the sintir at The Cross Culture Festival in Warsaw, Poland, 2012
