= Thrill Jockey discography =

This is the discography of the record label Thrill Jockey

- thrill 610 – Claire Rousay – Sentiment (2024)
- thrill 543 – Elena Setién – Unfamiliar Minds (2022)
- thrill 528 – Sally Anne Morgan – Thread (2020)
- thrill 522 – Eye Flys – Tub of Lard (2020)
- thrill 520 – Rose City Band – Rose City Band (2020)
- thrill 518 – Helen Money – Arriving Angels (2019)
- thrill 517 – Sightless Pit – Grave of a Dog (2020)
- thrill 516 – Helen Money – Atomic (2020)
- thrill 515 – Oval – Eksploio (2019)
- thrill 514 – Oval – Scis (2020)
- thrill 511 – Jim White and Marisa Anderson – The Quickening (2020) (Translucent Green LP)
- thrill 510 – Wrekmeister Harmonies – We Love To Look at the Carnage (2020)
- thrill 509 – OOIOO – Nijimusi (2020)
- thrill 508 – Dan Friel – Fanfare (2019)
- thrill 507 – Emptyset – Blossoms (2019)
- thrill 506 – The Body – Remixed (2019)
- thrill 505 – Lightning Bolt – Sonic Citadel (2019)
- thrill 504 – Lightning Bolt – Oblivion Hunter (2019)
- thrill 503 – Lightning Bolt – Earthly Delights (2019)
- thrill 501 – Lightning Bolt – Wonderful Rainbow (2019)
- thrill 499 – Lightning Bolt – Ride the Skies (2019)
- thrill 498 – Lightning Bolt – Lightning Bolt (2020)
- thrill 497 – Charles Rumback & Ryley Walker – Little Common Twist (2019)
- thrill 496 – Black To Comm – Before After (2019)
- thrill 495 – Umberto – Helpless Spectator (2019)
- thrill 494 – Alexander Tucker – Guild of the Asbestos Weaver (2019)
- thrill 493 – Eye Flys – Context (2019)
- thrill 492 – Sequoyah Murray – Before You Begin (2019)
- thrill 491 – Sequoyah Murray – Penalties of Love (2019)
- thrill 490 – Aseethe – Throes (2019)
- thrill 489 – Martin Brandlmayr – Vive Les Fantômes (2019)
- thrill 488 – Jan St. Werner – Glottal Wolpertinger (2019)
- thrill 487 – Dommengang – No Keys (2019)
- thrill 486 – House and Land – Across the Field (2019)
- thrill 485 – ENDON – Boy Meets Girl (2019)
- thrill 484 – Fox Millions Duo – Biting Through (2019)
- thrill 483 – Sarah Louise – Nighttime Birds and Morning Stars (2019)
- thrill 482 – Matmos – Plastic Anniversary (2019)
- thrill 481 – Black To Comm – Seven Horses For Seven Kings (2019)
- thrill 480 – Colleen – Babies (2002)
- thrill 479 – Colleen – Les Ondes Silencieuses (2007)
- thrill 478 – Colleen – Colleen et les Boîtes à Musique (2006)
- thrill 477 – Colleen – The Golden Morning Breaks (2005)
- thrill 476 – Colleen – Everyone Alive Wants Answers (2003)
- thrill 475 – BEAST – Ens (2018)
- thrill 474 (single) – Elena Setién – Wreckage of The Hunt (2019)
- thrill 474 – Elena Setién – Another Kind Of Revolution (2019)
- thrill 473 – Oozing Wound – High Anxiety (2019)
- thrill 472 – Upper Wilds – Mars (2018)
- thrill 471 – Thalia Zedek Band – Fighting Season (2018)
- thrill 470 – SUMAC – Love in Shadow (2018)
- thrill 469 – Alexander Tucker – Don’t Look Away (2018)
- thrill 468 – Glenn Jones – The Giant Who Ate Himself and Other New Works for 6 & 12 String Guitar (2018)
- thrill 467 – Brendon Anderegg – June (2018)
- thrill 466 – Marisa Anderson – Cloud Corner (2018)
- thrill 465 – John Parish – Bird Dog Dante (2018)
- thrill 464 – Wooden Shjips – V. (2018)
- thrill 463 – Keiji Haino & SUMAC – American Dollar Bill – Keep Facing Sideways, You're Too Hideous to Look at Face On (2018)
- thrill 462 – E – Negative Work (2018)
- thrill 461 – Mouse on Mars – Dimensional People (2018)
- thrill 460 – The Body – I Have Fought Against It, but I Can't Any Longer. (2018)
- thrill 459 – The Sea and Cake – Any Day (2018)
- thrill 458 – Wrekmeister Harmonies – The Alone Rush (2018)
- thrill 457 – Brother JT – Tornado Juice (2018)
- thrill 456 – Yunohana Variations (YoshimiO, Susie Ibarra, Robert Aiki Aubrey Lowe) – Flower of Sulphur (2018)
- thrill 455 – The Skull Defekts – The Skull Defekts (2018)
- thrill 454 – Dommengang – Love Jail (2018)
- thrill 453 – The Body & Thou – Released From Love / You, Whom I Have Always Hated (2018)
- thrill 452 – Tortoise – The Catastrophist Tour Book (2017)
- thrill 450 – Jan St. Werner – Spectric Acid (2017)
- thrill 447 – The Body & Full of Hell – Ascending a Mountain of Heavy Light (2017)
- thrill 446 – Golden Retriever – Rotations (2017)
- thrill 444 – House and Land – House and Land (2017)
- thrill 443 – Glenn Jones – Against Which The Sea Continually Beats (2017)
- thrill 442 – Sidi Touré – Toubalbero (2018)
- thrill 441 – Man Forever – Play What They Want (2017)
- thrill 440 – White Hills – Stop Mute Defeat (2017)
- thrill 439 – Dustin Wong & Takako Minekawa – Are Euphoria (2017)
- thrill 438 – Glenn Jones & Matthew Azevedo – Waterworks (2017)
- thrill 437 – Trans Am – California Hotel (2016)
- thrill 436 – Pontiak – Dialectic of Ignorance (2017)
- thrill 435 – Brian Gibson – Thumper (2016)
- thrill 434 – Sumac – Before You I Appear (2016)
- thrill 433 – Arbouretum – Song of the Rose (2017)
- thrill 432 – Entrance – Book of Changes (2017)
- thrill 430 – Glenn Jones – This is the Wind that Blows it Out (2017)
- thrill 429 – Emptyset – Borders (2017)
- thrill 428 – Entrance – Promises (2016)
- thrill 427 – Sarah Louise – Deeper Woods (2018)
- thrill 424 – Radian – On Dark Silent Off (2016)
- thrill 421 – Wrekmeister Harmonies – Light Falls (2016)
- thrill 418 – Helen Money – Become Zero (2016)
- thrill 417 – Sumac – What One Becomes (2016)
- thrill 414 – Rhyton – Redshift (2016)
- thrill 413 – Brokeback – Illinois River Valley Blues (2017)
- thrill 409 – Thalia Zedek Band – Eve (2016)
- thrill 408 – Glenn Jones – Fleeting (2016)
- thrill 407 – The Body – No One Deserves Happiness (2016)
- thrill 406 – Tortoise – The Catastrophist (2016)
- thrill 405 – Dan Friel – Life (2015)
- thrill 403 – Wrekmeister Harmonies – Night of Your Ascension (2015)
- thrill 401 – Matmos – Ultimate Care II (2016)
- thrill 398 – Golden Void – Berkana (2015)
- thrill 397 – Holy Sons – Fall of Man (2015)
- thrill 395 – Eleventh Dream Day – Works for Tomorrow (2015)
- thrill 391 – White Hills – Walks for Motorists (2015)
- thrill 389 – Peals – Seltzer (2015)
- thrill 388 – Eternal Tapestry – Wild Strawberries (2015)
- thrill 387 – Colleen – Captain of None (2015)4
- thrill 378 – Liturgy – The Ark Work
- thrill 339 – Wrekmeister Harmonies – "You've Always Meant So Much to Me" (2013)
- thrill 335 – Peals – Walking Field (2013)
- thrill 319 – Eternal Tapestry – A World Out of Time (2012)
- thrill 315 – Matmos – "The Ganzfeld EP" (2012)
- thrill 313 – Guardian Alien – "See the World Given to a One Love Entity" (2012)
- thrill 286 – High Places – "Original Colors" (2011)
- thrill 285 – Future Islands – On the Water (2011)
- thrill 284 – Future Islands – "Before the Bridge" b/w "Find Love" 7" (2011)
- thrill 283 – Luke Roberts – "Big Bells & Dime Songs" (2011)
- thrill 282 – Tunnels – "The Blackout" (2011)
- thrill 280 – Barn Owl – Lost in the Glare (2011)
- thrill 279 – Wooden Shjips – "West" (2011)
- thrill 278 – The Sea and Cake – The Moonlight Butterfly (2011)
- thrill 277 – Barn Owl – "Shadowland" (2011)
- thrill 276 – White Hills – "H-p1" (2011)
- thrill 275 – Pontiak – "Comecrudos" (2011)
- thrill 274 – Mountains – "Air Museum" (2011)
- thrill 273 – Liturgy – Aesthethica (2011)
- thrill 272 – Sorry Bamba – "Volume One 1970–1979" (2011)
- thrill 271 – Glenn Jones – "The Wanting" (2011)
- thrill 270 – Oval/Liturgy – Split LP (2011)
- thrill 269 – Mitchell & Manley – "NorCal Values" (2011)
- thrill 268 – Glenn Jones "Even to Win is to Fail" b/w The Black Twig Pickers & Charlie Parr "EastMont Syrup" (2011)
- thrill 267 – Zomes – "Earth Grid" (2011)
- thrill 266 – Eternal Tapestry & Sun Araw – Night Gallery (2011)
- thrill 265 – Alexander Tucker – "Dorwytch" (2011)
- thrill 264 – D. Charles Speer & The Helix – "Leaving the Commonwealth" (2011)
- thrill 263 – D. Charles Speer – "Arghiledes" (2011)
- thrill 262 – Matthew Friedberger – "Solos" Subscription Series/Box Set (2011)
- thrill 261 – Eleventh Dream Day – "Riot Now" (2011)
- thrill 260 – The Skull Defekts – "Peer Amid" (2011)
- thrill 259 – Rick Rizzo & Tara Key – "Double Star" (2011)
- thrill 258 – Phil Manley – "Life Coach" (2011)
- thrill 257 – Arbouretum – "The Gathering" (2011)
- thrill 256 – Sidi Touré – "Sahel Folk" (2011)
- thrill 255 – Twig Harper & Daniel Higgs – "Clairaudience Fellowship" (2010)
- thrill 254 – Koen Holtkamp – "Gravity/Bees" (2010)
- thrill 253 – Barn Owl – "Ancestral Star" (2010)
- thrill 252 – Eternal Tapestry – Beyond the 4th Door (2011)
- thrill 251 – Dustin Wong – "Infinite Love" (2010)
- thrill 250 – Boredoms – "77 BOA DRUM" DVD (2010)
- thrill 249 – The Black Twig Pickers – Ironto Special (2010)
- thrill 248 – Sam Prekop – Old Punch Card (2010)
- thrill 247 – Coil Sea – "Coil Sea" (2010)
- thrill 246 – Fennesz / Daniell / Buck – Knoxville (2010)
- thrill 245 – Imbogodom – The Metallic Year (2010)
- thrill 244 – Oval – O (2010)
- thrill 243 – Thank You – "Golden Worry" (2011)
- thrill 242 – Tunng – ...And Then We Saw Land (2010)
- thrill 241 – Lazer Crystal – MCMLXXX (2010)
- thrill 240 – Daniel Higgs – Say God (2010)
- thrill 239 – Double Dagger – Masks (2010)
- thrill 238 – High Places – High Places v. Mankind (2010)
- thrill 237 – Mi Ami – Steal Your Face (2010)
- thrill 236 – Trans Am – Thing (2010)
- thrill 235 – Future Islands – In Evening Air (2010)
- thrill 234 – Rob A.A. Lowe and Rose Lazar – Eclipses (Limited to 750 copies) (2010)
- thrill 233 – Pontiak – Living (2010)
- thrill 232 – White Hills – White Hills (2010)
- thrill 231 – Pit Er Pat – The Flexible Entertainer (2010)
- thrill 230 – Pontiak – Sea Voids (Limited to 1000 vinyl copies)(2009)
- thrill 229 – Jack Rose – Luck in the Valley (2010)
- thrill 228 – Chicago Underground Duo – Boca Negra (2010)
- thrill 227 – Trans Am – What Day is it Tonight? (December 8, 2009)
- thrill 226 – Mountains – Etching (Limited to 1000 copies) (2009)
- thrill 225 – Jason Urick – Husbands (Limited to 500 copies) (2009)
- thrill 224 – Radian – Chimeric (2009)
- thrill 223 – Matthew Friedberger – Winter Women / Holy Ghost Language School (2009)
- thrill 222 – OOIOO – Armonico Hewa (2009)
- thrill 221 – Boredoms – Super Roots 10 (2009)
- thrill 220 – The Fiery Furnaces – I'm Going Away (July 1, 2009)
- thrill 219 – Lokai – Transition (September, 2009)
- thrill 218 – Angela Desveaux – If I Ever Loved 7" (Limited to 500 copies) (2009)
- thrill 217 – White Hills – Heads on Fire (2009)
- thrill 216 – David Daniell and Douglas McCombs – Sycamore (August 18, 2009)
- thrill 215 – Double Dagger – More (May, 2009)
- thrill 214 – Extra Golden – Thank You Very Quickly (2009)
- thrill 213 – Pontiak – Maker
- thrill 212 – Arbouretum – Song of the Pearl (2009)
- thrill 211 – Mountains – Choral (2009)(orange and white cover), April 2009 vinyl reissue with brown and white cover
- thrill 210 – Tortoise – Beacons of Ancestorship (2009)
- thrill 209 – Lithops – Ye Viols! (2009)
- thrill 208 – Pit Er Pat – High Time (October, 2008)
- thrill 207 – High Places – High Places (September, 2008)
- thrill 206 – Pontiak – Sun on Sun (September, 2008)
- thrill 205 – The Sea and Cake – Car Alarm (October, 2008)
- thrill 204 – High Places – 03/07–09/07 (July, 2008)
- thrill 203 – Angela Desveaux – The Mighty Ship (September, 2008)
- thrill 202 – The Fiery Furnaces – Remember (August, 2008)
- thrill 201 – Arbouretum / Pontiak – Kale split album (July, 2008)
- thrill 200 – Various – Plum 7 Inches Box Set
- thrill 199 – The Accidental – There Were Wolves
- thrill 198 – Thank You – Terrible Two
- thrill 197 – Boredoms – Super Roots 9
- thrill 196 – Thalia Zedek – Liars and Prayers
- thrill 195 – Robert A.A. Lowe & Rose Lazar – Gyromancy
- thrill 194 – Nemeth – Film
- thrill 193 – School of Language – Sea from Shore
- thrill 192 – Bill Dixon with Exploding Star Orchestra – Bill Dixon with Exploding Star Orchestra
- thrill 191 – Human Bell – Human Bell
- thrill 190 – Tunng – Good Arrows
- thrill 189 – The Fiery Furnaces – Widow City
- thrill 188 – KTL – 2
- thrill 187 – Extra Golden – Hera Ma Nono
- thrill 186 – The Sea and Cake – Everybody
- thrill 185 – ADULT. – Why Bother?
- thrill 184 – Daniel A.I.U. Higgs – Atomic Yggdrasil Tarot
- thrill 183 – Fred Anderson & Hamid Drake – From the River to the Ocean
- thrill 182 – Trans Am – Sex Change
- thrill 181 – Exploding Star Orchestra – We are all from somewhere else.
- thrill 180 – Arbouretum – Rites of Uncovering
- thrill 179 – Lithops – Mound Magnet
- thrill 178 – The Zincs – Black Pompadour
- thrill 177 – Bobby Conn – King For A Day
- thrill 176 – Pit er Pat – Covers EP
- thrill 175 – Angela Desveaux – Wandering Eyes
- thrill 174 – Tom Verlaine – Around
- thrill 173 – Tom Verlaine – Songs and Other Things
- thrill 172 – Eleventh Dream Day – Zeroes and Ones
- thrill 171 – OOIOO – Eye Remix EP
- thrill 170 – Califone – Roomsound
- thrill 169 – Pit er Pat – 3D Message
- thrill 168 – Chicago Underground Duo – In Praise of Shadows
- thrill 167 – Howe Gelb – Sno Angel Like You
- thrill 166 – Arizona Amp and Alternator – Arizona Amp and Alternator
- thrill 165 – Town and Country – Up Above
- thrill 164 – Frequency – Frequency
- thrill 163 – Califone – Roots & Crowns
- thrill 162 – Tom Verlaine – Warm and Cool
- thrill 161 – OOIOO – TAIGA
- thrill 160 – OOIOO – Gold and Green
- thrill 159 – ADULT. – Gimmie Trouble
- thrill 158 – Aki Tsuyuko – Hokane
- thrill 157 – John Parish – Once Upon A Little Time
- thrill 156 – ADULT. – D.U.M.E.
- thrill 155 – Bobby Conn – Live Classics Vol. 1
- thrill 154 – Pit er Pat – Shakey
- thrill 153 – Extra Golden – Ok-Oyot System
- thrill 152 – Tortoise – A Lazarus Taxon
- thrill 151 – The Zincs – Dimmer
- thrill 150 – Freakwater – Thinking of You
- thrill 149 – Archer Prewitt – Wilderness
- thrill 148 – Thalia Zedek – Trust Not Those in Whom Without Some Touch of Madness
- thrill 147 – Radian – Juxtaposition
- thrill 146 – Sam Prekop – Who's Your New Professor
- thrill 145 – Jimmy Martin – Don't Cry to Me
- thrill 144 – Trans Am – Liberation
- thrill 143 – The National Trust – Kings and Queens
- thrill 142 – Giant Sand – Is All Over... The Map
- thrill 141 – Trapist – Ballroom
- thrill 140 – Sticks & Stones – Shed Grace
- thrill 139 – Fred Anderson & Hamid Drake – Back Together Again
- thrill 138 – The Band of Blacky Ranchette – Still Lookin' Good to Me
- thrill 137 – Bobby Conn – The Homeland
- thrill 136 – Chicago Underground Trio – Slon
- thrill 135 – Califone – Heron King Blues
- thrill 134 – Mouse On Mars – Radical Connector
- thrill 133 – David Byrne – Lead Us Not Into Temptation: Music from the Film Young Adam
- thrill 132 – Lithops – Scrypt
- thrill 131 – Eleventh Dream Day – Prairie School Freakout / Wayne EP Reissue
- thrill 130 – So – So
- thrill 129 – Jeff Parker (guitarist) – The Relatives
- thrill 128 – Town and Country – 5
- thrill 127 – Mouse On Mars – Glam
- thrill 126 – The Lonesome Organist – Forms and Follies
- thrill 125 – The Sea and Cake – Glass
- thrill 124 – Howe Gelb – The Listener
- thrill 123 – Nobukazu Takemura – Assembler
- thrill 122 – Califone – Quicksand / Cradlesnakes
- thrill 121 – Janet Bean and The Concertina Wire – Dragging Wonder Lake
- thrill 120 – Brokeback – Looks at the Bird
- thrill 119 – Catherine Irwin – Cut Yourself A Switch
- thrill 118 – Nobukazu Takemura – 10th
- thrill 117 – OOIOO – Kila Kila Kila
- thrill 116 – The Sea and Cake – One Bedroom
- thrill 115 – Tortoise – It's All Around You
- thrill 114 – Town and Country – C'Mon
- thrill 113 – Radian – Rec.Extern
- thrill 112 – Sue Garner – Shadyside
- thrill 111 – The National Trust – Dekkagar
- thrill 110 – John Parish – How Animals Move
- thrill 109 – Trans Am – TA
- thrill 108 – Archer Prewitt – Three
- thrill 107 – Trans Champs – Double Exposure
- thrill 106 – Chicago Underground Duo – Axis and Alignment
- thrill 105 – Nerves – World of Gold
- thrill 104 – Giant Sand – Cover Magazine
- thrill 103 – Oval – Ovalcommers
- thrill 102 – Andrew Coleman – Everything Was Beautiful, and Nothing Hurt
- thrill 101 – Fred Anderson and Robert Barry – Duets 2001
- thrill 100 – Thrill Jockey DVD – Looking for a Thrill : An Anthology of Inspiration
- thrill 099 – All Natural – Second Nature
- thrill 098 – Mouse On Mars – Idiology
- thrill 097 – Howe Gelb – Confluence
- thrill 095 – Mouse On Mars – Instrumentals
- thrill 094 – Nobukazu Takemura – Hoshi No Koe
- thrill 093 – Chicago Underground Quartet – Chicago Underground Quartet
- thrill 092 – Microstoria – Model 3, Step 2
- thrill 091 – Brokeback – Morse Code in the Modern Age: Across the Americas
- thrill 090 – Pullman – Viewfinder
- thrill 089 – Tortoise – Standards
- thrill 088 – Town and Country – It all has to do with it.
- thrill 087 – Trans Am – Red Line
- thrill 086 – The Sea and Cake – Oui
- thrill 085 – Eleventh Dream Day – Stalled Parade
- thrill 084 – Bobby Conn – The Golden Age
- thrill 083 – Town and Country – Decoration Day
- thrill 082 – Trans Am – You Can Always Get What You Want
- thrill 081 – Oval – Ovalprocess
- thrill 080 – Isotope 217 – Who Stole the I Walkman?
- thrill 079 – Giant Sand – Chore of Enchantment
- thrill 078 – Freakwater – Hellbound/Lorraine
- thrill 077 – Chicago Underground Duo – Synesthesia
- thrill 076 – Mouse On Mars – Niun Niggung
- thrill 075 – Bobby Conn – Llovessongs
- thrill 074 – The National Trust – Make It Happen
- thrill 073 – David Boykin Outlet – Evidence Of Life On Other Planets Vol. 1
- thrill 072 – Rick Rizzo and Tara Key – Dark Edson Tiger
- thrill 071 – 8 Bold Souls – Last Option
- thrill 070 – Brokeback – Field Recordings From The Cook County Water Table
- thrill 069 – Nerves – New Animal
- thrill 068 – Nobukazu Takemura – Scope
- thrill 067 – The Lonesome Organist – Cavalcade
- thrill 066 – Freakwater – End Time
- thrill 065 – Sue Garner & Rick Brown – Still
- thrill 064 – Oval – Szenariodisk
- thrill 063 – Isotope 217 – Utonian Automatic
- thrill 062 – Trans Am – Futureworld
- thrill 061 – Sam Prekop – Sam Prekop
- thrill 060 – Chicago Underground Duo – 12° of Freedom
- thrill 057 – Tortoise Madison Avenue/Madison Area Tour 7"
- thrill 056 – A Minor Forest – Inindependence
- thrill 055 – Pullman Turnstyles and Junkpiles
- thrill 054 – Trans Am – The Surveillance
- thrill 052 – Nerves – Nerves
- thrill 051 – Sue Garner – To Run More Smoothly
- thrill 050 – Tortoise – TNT
- thrill 049 – Isotope 217 – The Unstable Molecule
- thrill 048 – The Sea and Cake – Two Gentlemen
- thrill 047 – Freakwater – Springtime
- thrill 046 – Oval – Dok
- thrill 045 – Mouse On Mars – Autoditacker
- thrill 044 – The Lonesome Organist – Collector of Cactus Echo Bags
- thrill 042 – Microstoria – Reprovisers
- thrill 041 – Brokeback – Returns to the Orange Grove
- thrill 040 – Freakwater – Dancing Underwater
- thrill 039 – The Sea and Cake – The Fawn
- thrill 038 – Trans Am – Surrender to the Night
- thrill 037 – Eleventh Dream Day – Eighth
- thrill 036 – Oval – 94 diskont
- thrill 035 – Microstoria – _snd
- thrill 034 – A Minor Forest – Flemish Altruism
- thrill 033 – Directions – Directions In Music
- thrill 032 – Oval – Systemisch
- thrill 031 – Microstoria – init ding
- thrill 029 – Rome – Rome
- thrill 028 – Gaunt – Kryptonite
- thrill 026 – The Sea and Cake – The Biz
- thrill 025 – Tortoise – Millions Now Living Will Never Die
- thrill 024 – Trans Am – Trans Am
- thrill 023 – V3 – evil love deeper
- thrill 022 – Freakwater – Old Paint
- thrill 021 – The Sea and Cake – Nassau
- thrill 020 – Dolomite – Easter Someday
- thrill 018 – Vitapup – Disbelief / Laxative Cat
- thrill 017 – Gaunt – I Can See Your Mom From Here
- thrill 016 – The Sea and Cake – The Sea and Cake
- thrill 015 – Gaunt – Sob Story
- thrill 014 – Sugarshock – Mother Nature
- thrill 013 – Tortoise – Tortoise
- thrill 012 – Gorilla – Bargain Love
- thrill 011 – Dolomite – Acetate/gift Horse
- thrill 010 – Freakwater – Feels Like The Third Time
- thrill 009 – Freakwater – My Old Drunk Friend (7")
- thrill 008 – Gaunt – Pop Song (7")
- thrill 007 – Zip Gun – I Can't Wait (7")
- thrill 006 – Tortoise – Lonesome Sound (7")
- thrill 005 – Gorilla – Stuck on You
- thrill 004 – Sugarshock – I Hate the Kids
- thrill 003 – Gorilla – Deal With It
- thrill 002 – Gaunt – Whitey The Man (10-inch LP)
- thrill 001 – H.P. Zinker – Perseverance
- thrill 12.44 – Oval – Oh (2010) (1000 Copies – First Pressing white vinyl)
- thrill 12.43 – High Places – Can't Feel Born (2010) (1000 Copies white/blue marble vinyl)
- thrill 12.42 – Jack Rose With D. Charles Speer & The Helix – Ragged and Right (2010) (1000 Copies)
- thrill 12.41 – Future Islands – In The Fall (2010) (1000 Copies blue translucent vinyl)
- thrill 12.40 – Jason Urick – Fussing & Fighting (2010) (500 Copies)
- thrill 12.39 – Javelin – 2 (2010)
- thrill 12.38 – Mi Ami – Cut Men (2009) (500 Copies)
- thrill 12.37 – Javelin – Javelin (2009) (500 Copies)
- thrill 12.36 – White Hills – Dead (2009)
- thrill 12.35 – Thank You – Pathetic Magic (2009) (300 Copies)
- thrill 12.34 – Tortoise – Beacons of Ancestorship Remixes – Eye / Mark Ernestus (2009) (1500 Copies)
- thrill 12.33 – Pontiak – Sea Voids (2009) (500 Copies)
- thrill 12.32 – The Fiery Furnaces – The End Is Near (2009) (1000 Copies)
- thrill 12.31 – Pit Er Pat – High Time Remix (2009) (300 Copies)
- thrill 12.30 – Various Artists – Records Toreism (4-18-09 for Record Store Day)
- thrill 12.29 – Trey Told 'Em – Super Epic Thrill Jockey Mega Massive Mix
- thrill 12.27 – Gray Market Goods – Soldier of Fortune / We Live in the Future
- thrill 12.26 – Trans Am – Extremixxx
- thrill 12.25 – Nobukazu Takemura – Mimic Robot
- thrill 12.24 – Mouse On Mars – Agit Itter It It
- thrill 12.23 – Bobby Conn – Winners
- thrill 12.22 – Tortoise – Gently Cupping the Chin of the Ape
- thrill 12.21 – Mouse On Mars – Actionist Respoke
- thrill 12.20 – Nobukazu Takemura – Sign
- thrill 12.19 – Lithops – Fi/Sequenced Twinset
- thrill 12.18 – The Eternals – Where Will We Live Now?
- thrill 12.17 – Andrew Coleman – Blame It On Adam
- thrill 12.16 – The Eternals – Chapter & Verse
- thrill 12.15 – Vert – Mewantemoosic (12-inch LP)
- thrill 12.15 – The Eternals – Chapter And Verse (12-inch LP)
- thrill 12.14 – Mouse On Mars – Pickly Dred Rhizzoms
- thrill 12.13 – Nobukazu Takemura – Limited (12-inch LP)
- thrill 12.12 – Wang Inc. – Wang Inc. (12-inch LP)
- thrill 12.11 – Tortoise – Autechre (12-inch LP)
- thrill 12.10 – Tortoise – Derrick Carter (12-inch LP)
- thrill 12.9 – Tortoise – Remixed (CD)
- thrill 12.8 – Microstoria – Jim O'Rourke/Violent Onsen Geisha
- thrill 12.7 – Microstoria/Ui/Mouse On Mars (12-inch LP)
- thrill 12.6 – Microstoria – Stereolab/Oval
- thrill 12.5 – Tortoise – The Taut and Tame
- thrill 12.4 – Tortoise – Rivers
- thrill 12.3 – Tortoise – Music for Workgroups
- thrill 12.2 – Rome – Beware Soul Snatchers
- thrill 12.1 – Tortoise – Djed
- UR062 – Sima Kim & Wouter Van Veldhoven – Sketches (cassette)
- ura 006 – Trans Am – Who Do We Think You Are?
- baros1 – Pit er Pat – The Babies Are Tired/Lullaby
- OC23 – Pit er Pat – Emergency
- BC-041 – Nobukazu Takemura – Songbook
- CA-001 – The Zincs – Forty Winks with the Zincs
- s-44 – Mouse On Mars – Wipe That Sound
- SSF 001 – Jimmy Martin – The Life & Times of Jimmy Martin – Video
- DG 543 – Jeff Parker – Like-Coping (cf Delmark)
- owom 04 – Howe Gelb – Lull Some Piano
- owom 07 – Howe Gelb – Ogle Some Piano
- EZ-26 – ADULT. – Anxiety Always
- EZ-15 – ADULT. – Resuscitation
- EZ-033 – ADULT. / Dirtbombs – Pray for Pills / Lost Love
- EZ-028 – ADULT. / Tamion 12 Inch – T & A
- T 302 – Bobby Conn – Bobby Conn
- T-672 – Bobby Conn – Never Get Ahead
- de 558 – Jeff Parker & Scott Fields – Song Songs Song

== See also ==
- Thrill Jockey
