= V (Barn Owl album) =

Studio album by Barn Owl
- Released: April 16, 2013
- Length: 41:37
- Label: Thrill Jockey

Barn Owl chronology
Lost in the Glare (2011)	V (2013)

Professional ratings
Aggregate scores
Source	Rating
AnyDecentMusic?	6.7/10
Metacritic	73/100
Review scores
Source	Rating
AllMusic	3.5/5 stars
Blurt	3/5 stars
MusicOMH	3.5/5 stars
Pitchfork	6.8/10
PopMatters	7/10

V is the eighth studio album by American musical duo Barn Owl. It was released on April 16, 2013, by Thrill Jockey.

== Critical reception ==
V was met with "generally favorable" reviews from critics. At Metacritic, which assigns a weighted average rating out of 100 to reviews from mainstream publications, this release received an average score of 73 based on 10 reviews. Aggregator website AnyDecentMusic? gave the release a 6.7 out of 10 based on a critical consensus of 6 reviews.

In a review for AllMusic, critic reviewer Fred Thomas wrote: "While the band perfected the sound of an empty, barren desert at night with its previous instrumental offerings, V leans away from the underlying dread and general despair of earlier albums, moving more toward the ominous than the doomed. The gradient of emotional tides on V is wrapped in disintegrating guitar tones, obscuring the swatches of hope, disappointment, loss, and discovery in thin sheets of static and sounds that feel buried shallowly under the ground in the backyard." Michael Toland of Blurt said: "Jon Porras and Evan Caminiti use guitars and electronics to create an audio miasma that leaves a mist on your skin." At Dusted Magazine, Joseph Burdett called V "more intimate and introverted than Ancestral Star or Lost in the Glare."

=== Accolades ===
Publications' year-end list appearances for V
Critic/Publication	List	Rank	Ref
The Quietus	The Quietus' Top 100 Albums of 2013	84	

== Track listing ==
V track listing
No.	Title	Writer(s)	Length
1.	"Void Redux"	Evan Caminiti; Jon Porras	6:22
2.	"The Long Shadow"	Caminiti; Porras	5:36
3.	"Against the Night"	Caminiti; Porras	4:04
4.	"Blood Echo"	Caminiti; Porras	5:23
5.	"Pacific Isolation"	Caminiti; Porras	2:40
6.	"The Opulent Decline"	Caminiti; Porras	17:32
