= The Unquiet Grave =

Traditional song

"The Unquiet Grave" is an Irish / English folk song in which a young man's grief over the death of his true love is so deep that it disturbs her eternal sleep. It was collected in 1868 by Francis James Child as Child Ballad number 78. One of the more common tunes used for the ballad is the same as that used for the English ballad "Dives and Lazarus" and the Irish pub favorite "Star of the County Down".

== Synopsis ==
A man mourns his true love for "a twelve month and a day". At the end of that time, the dead woman complains that his weeping is keeping her from peaceful rest. He begs a kiss. She tells him it would kill him. When he persists, wanting to join her in death, she explains that once they are both dead their hearts will simply decay, so he should enjoy life while he has it.

== Variants ==
The version noted by Cecil Sharp ends with "When will we meet again? / When the autumn leaves that fall from the trees / Are green and spring up again."

Many verses in this ballad have parallels in other ballads: Bonny Bee Hom, Sweet William's Ghost and some variants of The Twa Brothers.

== Return of the dead ==
The motif that excessive grief can disturb the dead is found also in German and Scandinavian ballads, as well as Greek and Roman traditions.

In 1941 the "Journal of the English Folk Dance and Song Society" Vol 4 no 2 included a long essay by Ruth Harvey. She compares motifs from "The Unquiet Grave" with other European ballads, including "Es ging ein Knab spazieren (Der tote Freier)" from Germany, and "Faestemanden I Graven" from Denmark. She writes: "It is only inevitable that a song which certainly goes back to pre-Christian traditions should have suffered modification during the centuries."

The Danish ballad "Faestemanden I Graven" was made into a short film, "Aage og Else" (1983). Though not recorded till the nineteenth century, “The Unquiet Grave,” as a folk work, may date to the same period as those two seventeenth-century ballads. On the Fresno State University website, Robert B Waltz compares "The Unquiet Grave" with an older carol, "There blows a cold wind today," in the Bodleian Library MS 7683 (dated ca. 1500), but adds: "I must say that I find this a stretch; the similarities are slight indeed."

== Recordings ==
- The composer Ralph Vaughan Williams wrote several arrangements for "How Cold the Wind doth Blow (or The Unquiet Grave)". The best known, from 1912, is for piano, violin and voice. It was recorded in 1976 by Sir Philip Ledger, Hugh Bean and Robert Tear. Catalogue It also appears on the 1989 recording Songs of Britten and Vaughan Williams by Canadian baritone Kevin McMillan.
- Kate Rusby, Rebsie Fairholm, Carol Noonan, Joan Baez, the Dubliners, Solas, Barbara Dickson, Shirley Collins, Circulus, David Pajo, Fire + Ice and Sarah Calderwood have recorded versions of this song.
- A single-movement viola concerto by Australian composer Andrew Ford used the melody of the ballad as its foundation. Written in 1997, the concerto is pieced together from melodic fragments of the ballad and it is only in the final few minutes that the full theme emerges.
- Being a well-documented song and publicised by English Folk Dance and Song Society, The Broadside Ballads Project, and Mainly Norfolk, the song was recorded by Jon Boden and Oli Steadman for inclusion in their respective lists of daily folk songs "A Folk Song a Day" and "365 Days Of Folk".
- The Pennsylvania-based alternative rock band Ween recorded a version of the song (retitled "Cold Blows the Wind") on their 1997 album, The Mollusk. The liner notes jokingly describe the song as traditional Chinese spiritual.
- The gothic/darkwave band Faith and the Muse recorded a version on their debut Elyria in 1994.
- It was recorded and released as a duet between Ian Read and Ysanne Spevack in 2000, distributed by Tesco in Germany, and pressed up on blue vinyl with a letterpress gatefold cover under the band name Fire + Ice.
- Papa M recorded a version for his 2001 album "Whatever, Mortal"
- The folk-rock group Steeleye Span recorded a version on their 2009 album Cogs, Wheels and Lovers.
- Electro noir artist Alien Skin, formerly with Real Life (of '80s "Send Me An Angel" fame), recorded a version on his 2010 album The Unquiet Grave.
- Orcadian singer Kris Drever recorded a version of this song to music of his own on Lau's album Lightweights and Gentlemen in 2009.
- The eleven-piece folk band Bellowhead recorded a cover of Ween's version ("Cold Blows the Wind") for their 2010 album Hedonism.
- An electronic arrangement by Vladislav Korolev was sung by Lori Joachim Fredrics and premiered on April 13, 2013.
- The German electronica/darkwave band Helium Vola included a rendition on their 2013 album, Wohin?.
- British folk singer/songwriter Elliott Morris included an arrangement of "Unquiet Grave" on his 2013 EP, Shadows and Whispers.
- British medieval folk-rock band Gryphon recorded their interpretation of the ballad using the Dives and Lazarus melody on their 1973 debut album, Gryphon.
- English progressive rock musician Steven Wilson recorded an arrangement of the song. It was the B-Side to "Cover version IV", one of a series of six singles, each consisting of a cover of a song written by another artist as the A-side, with the B-sides consisting of original songs (with the exception of "The Unquiet Grave"). The six cover versions and corresponding B-sides were released together on a compilation album, Cover Version, in 2014.
- Part of the song was performed by Helen McCrory in the Penny Dreadful episode "Fresh Hell", and again by Sarah Greene in "And They Were Enemies".
- The Ghosts of Johnson City recorded a version of the song for their 2015 album Am I Born To Die?
- Daoirí Farrell recorded a version of the song on his 2016 album "True Born Irishman"
- Joan Baez sings it on three albums:
  - Joan Baez/5 (1964)
  - the compilation album The Joan Baez Lovesong Album (1976)
  - the live album Live at Newport (1996)
- House and Land interpret the song as their final track on their self-titled 2017 album.
- The English folk duo The Askew Sisters recorded the ballad on their 2014 album In the Air or the Earth.
- The Spanish dark pagan folk band Trobar de Morte recorded a version of the song on their eighth studio album The Book of Shadows in 2020.
- Irish singers Pauline Scanlon and Damien Dempsey performed a six and a half minute duet on Scanlon's 2022 album, The Unquiet.
- American Pine Barrens folk band Jackson Pines recorded their interpretation for their album Pine Barrens Vol. 1 in 2023. The ballad was connected to a lost town called Colliers Mills in their hometown of Jackson, NJ by song-catcher Herbert Halpert in 1936. Allen Clevenger of Wrightstown sang it to him and said his mother-in-law Mrs. Grover nee Cotter sang it in Colliers Mills as a girl.
- Canadian Celtic/Polka Punk Band The Dreadnoughts released a version of the song on March 14, 2023.
- The song features prominently in the 2025 movie History of Sound. Arranged by Sam Amidon.
