= Rose City Band =

- Years active: 2019-present
- Members: Ripley Johnson; John Jeffrey; Barry Walker; Paul Hasenberg; Sanae Yamada
- Website: www.rosecityband.org

Rose City Band is an American rock band formed by Ripley Johnson. The band name references Johnson's home town Portland, Oregon. The band was created by Johnson as a side project, and he played the majority of the instruments for their self-titled first release. The band has released five albums and is described as having influences from psychadelic, country, and jam band music.

Ripley Johnson is also known for his associations with Wooden Shjips and Moon Duo.

== Discography ==
Studio Albums

- Rose City Band (2019)
- Summerlong (2020)
- Earth Trip (2021)
- Garden Party (2023)
- Sol Y Sambra (2025)

Singles

- Lights on the Way (2024)
- Seeds of Light (2024)
- Radio Song (2025)
