= Innocence (Pontiak album) =

Studio album by Pontiak
- Released: 28 January 2014
- Length: 32:42
- Label: Thrill Jockey

Pontiak chronology
Echo Ono (2012)	Innocence (2014)

Innocence is 10th album of American neo-psychedelic rock band Pontiak released on January 28, 2014. It had relatively positive reception from critics by scoring 73 on Metascore. Ryan J. Prado from Paste Magazine says ""Pontiak" and "ballad" were probably never supposed to be in the same sentence together, but the band's insistence on its soft side for even a few songs is an exciting prospect that makes Innocence a diamond in the rough."

The album was released in both CD and vinyl versions.

== Track listing ==
1. "Innocence"; – 2:17
2. "Lack Lustre Rush" – 2:27
3. "Ghosts" – 3:20
4. "It's the Greatest" – 3:59
5. "Noble Heads" – 2:41
6. "Wildfires" – 3:48
7. "Surrounded by Diamonds" – 2:37
8. "Beings of the Rarest" – 3:09
9. "Shining" – 2:09
10. "Darkness is Coming" – 3:15
11. "We've Got it Wrong" – 3:00
