= A Flame My Love, a Frequency =

Studio album by Colleen
- Released: 20 October 2017
- Length: 43:11
- Label: Thrill Jockey

Colleen chronology
Captain of None (2015)	A Flame My Love, a Frequency (2017)	The Tunnel and the Clearing (2021)

A Flame My Love, a Frequency is the sixth studio album by French singer-songwriter Colleen. It was released on 20 October 2017 through Thrill Jockey.

== Critical reception ==
Professional ratings
Aggregate scores
Source	Rating
AnyDecentMusic?	7.4/10
Metacritic	80/100
Review scores
Source	Rating
AllMusic	5/5 stars
Exclaim!	8/10
Pitchfork	7.8/10
Tiny Mix Tapes	4/5 stars
Under the Radar	7/10

A Flame My Love, a Frequency received a score of 80 out of 100 on review aggregator Metacritic based on 10 critics' reviews, indicating "generally favorable" reception.

== Track listing ==
A Flame My Love, a Frequency track listing
No.	Title	Length
1.	"November"	2:08
2.	"Separating"	7:30
3.	"Another World"	5:58
4.	"Winter Dawn"	5:15
5.	"Summer Night (Bat Song)"	5:14
6.	"The Stars vs. Creatures"	5:14
7.	"One Warm Spark"	4:48
8.	"A Flame My Love, a Frequency"	7:04
