= Riton =

Riton may refer to:

- Riton (musician) (born 1978), recording name of electronic musician Henry Smithson
- Riton (duet), a Bulgarian pop duet
- Riton Liebman (born 1964), Belgian comedian, actor and director
- Lutfor Rahman Riton, Bangladeshi writer

== See also ==
- Rhyton, a drinking vessel
- Rhyton (band), American band
