= Let It All In (Arbouretum album) =

Studio album by Arbouretum
- Released: March 20, 2020
- Studio: Wrightway Studios, Baltimore, USA
- Length: 45:36
- Label: Thrill Jockey

Arbouretum chronology
Song of the Rose (2017)	Let It All In (2020)

Professional ratings
Aggregate scores
Source	Rating
Metacritic	81/100
Review scores
Source	Rating
AllMusic	4/5 stars
MusicOMH	3.5/5 stars
Pitchfork	7.8/10
Uncut	4/5 stars

Let It All In is the tenth studio album by American alternative rock band Arbouretum. It was released on March 20, 2020 under Thrill Jockey.

== Critical reception ==
Let It All In was met with universal acclaim reviews from critics. At Metacritic, which assigns a weighted average rating out of 100 to reviews from mainstream publications, this release received an average score of 81, based on 8 reviews.

== Track listing ==
Let It All In track listing
No.	Title	Length
1.	"How Deep It Goes"	6:32
2.	"A Prism in Reverse"	3:57
3.	"No Sanctuary Blues"	5:34
4.	"Night Theme"	2:16
5.	"Headwaters II"	5:35
6.	"Buffeted by Wind"	4:39
7.	"Let It All In"	11:48
8.	"High Water Song"	5:15

== Charts ==
Chart performance for Let It All In
Chart (2020)	Peak position
UK Independent Albums (Official Charts)	46
