= Vol. 2 (Wooden Shjips album) =

Compilation album by Wooden Shjips
- Released: 2010
- Genre: Psychedelic rock
- Label: Holy Mountain, Thrill Jockey
- Producer: Wooden Shjips

Wooden Shjips chronology
Dos (2009)	Vol. 2 (2010)	West (2011)

Professional ratings
Aggregate scores
Source	Rating
Metacritic	76/100
Review scores
Source	Rating
Allmusic	4/5 stars
Drowned in Sound	8/10
The Guardian	3/5 stars
The List	4/5 stars
Loud and Quiet	9/10
musicOMH	3.5/5 stars
NME	8/10
Pitchfork Media	6.3/10
The Skinny	4/5 stars
Under the Radar (NZ)	8.2/10

Vol. 2 is a compilation album by Wooden Shjips.
