= Radian (band) =

- Origin: Vienna, Austria
- Genres: IDM; Post-rock
- Years active: 1996 to present
- Label: Thrill Jockey
- Members: Martin Brandlmayr; John Norman; Martin Siewert
- Past members: Stefan Németh
- Website: Official website

Radian is an Austrian experimental music group.

Their music touches on instrumental rock, post-rock, jazz and electronica, and is notable for imitating some of the more demanding musical structures of intelligent dance music.

The trio was formed in 1996, in Vienna.

== Members ==
1996-2011

- Martin Brandlmayr: drums, vibraphone, editing and arrangement
- Stefan Nemeth: synthesizer, guitars
- John Norman: bass

2011-

- Martin Brandlmayr: drums, vibraphone, electronics, editing and arrangement
- Martin Siewert: guitar, electronics
- John Norman: bass

== Discography ==
- Radian EP (1998) - Rhiz
- tg11 (2000) - Mego / Rhiz
- rec.extern (2002) - Thrill Jockey (recorded by John McEntire)
- Juxtaposition (2004) - Thrill Jockey
- Chimeric (2009) - Thrill Jockey
- Radian Verses Howe Gelb (2014) - Radian Releases (collaboration with Howe Gelb)
- On Dark Silent Off (2016) - Thrill Jockey
- Distorted Rooms (2023) - Thrill Jockey
