= Barn Owl (band) =

American experimental musical duo

Barn Owl is an American experimental musical duo from San Francisco, California.

== History ==
Barn Owl was founded by Jon Porras and Evan Caminiti, both guitarists, who met while attending San Francisco State University in 2005. The pair recorded music at home while working on other musical endeavors, and began releasing music in 2007. In 2010 they signed with Thrill Jockey, and released the first of three albums for the label. That year, they also founded their own boutique record label, Electric Totem.

Music critics have noted the influences of Alice Coltrane, Keiji Haino, Black Sabbath, Pandit Pran Nath, and Tony Conrad on the group's music.

== Discography ==
- Barn Owl (Foxglove Records, 2007)
- From Our Mouths a Perpetual Light (Not Not Fun Records, 2008)
- The Conjurer (Root Strata, 2009)
- Ancestral Star (Thrill Jockey, 2010)
- Lost in the Glare (Thrill Jockey, 2011)
- V (Thrill Jockey, 2013)
