= Miniature Portraits =

Studio album by Five Style
- Released: August 24, 1999
- Genre: Art rock
- Length: 37:40
- Label: Sub Pop

Five Style chronology
5ive Style (1995)	Miniature Portraits (1999)

Professional ratings
Review scores
Source	Rating
AllMusic	3/5 stars
Alternative Press	4/5 stars
NME	6/10
Pitchfork Media	7.2/10

Miniature Portraits is the second studio album by Five Style, released on August 24, 1999, by Sub Pop.

== Track listing ==
All music is composed by Five Style.

No.	Title	Length
1.	"Mythical Numbers"	3:17
2.	"Marmy the Count"	3:28
3.	"Father Time"	3:49
4.	"The Lost Oar"	3:12
5.	"Here We Go"	4:34
6.	"Pledge Drive"	3:53
7.	"Wrong About You"	2:15
8.	"Hit the Decks"	2:39
9.	"The Fancy Dance in Jeremy's Pants"	1:35
10.	"Sailor Girl Song"	2:30
11.	"Pet the Cow"	3:39
12.	"Playful Sounds for Hustile Grounds" (reprise)	2:49

== Personnel ==
Adapted from the Miniature Portraits liner notes.

Five Style

- Leroy Bach – bass guitar, guitar, electric piano, Clavinet
- Bill Dolan – guitar
- John Herndon – drums, drum machine, congas
- Jeremy Jacobsen – keyboards, guitar, acoustic guitar, bass guitar, steel drums, keyboards, organ, melodica, marimba, piano, electric piano, synthesizer

Production and additional personnel

- Five Style – mixing
- Mike Hagler – engineering, mastering, mixing
- Jesse LeDoux – cover art

== Release history ==
Region	Date	Label	Format	Catalog
United States	1999	Sub Pop	CD	SP 479
