= Mountains (band) =

- Genres: Drone
- Years active: 1999–present
- Labels: Apestaartje; Thrill Jockey
- Members: Brendon Anderegg; Koen Holtkamp

Mountains are an American drone band, originally from Chicago. They are based in New York. Formed by school friends Brendon Anderegg and Koen Holtkamp, the band's first two albums were released on their own label, Apestaartje with subsequent releases on the Thrill Jockey Records label.

== Discography ==
=== Albums ===
- Mountains (Apestaartje, 2005)
- Sewn (Apestaartje, 2006)
- Mountains Mountains Mountains (Catsup Plate, 2008, reissued by Thrill Jockey, 2013)
- Choral (Thrill Jockey, 2009)
- Air Museum (Thrill Jockey, 2011)
- Centralia (Thrill Jockey, 2013)
