= High Places (album) =

Studio album by High Places
- Released: September 23, 2008
- Genre: Psychedelic pop
- Length: 30:00
- Label: Thrill Jockey

High Places chronology
| 03/07-09/07 (2008) | High Places (2008) | High Places vs. Mankind (2010) |

High Places is the debut full-length from Brooklyn indie band High Places. The album was released September 23, 2008, by Thrill Jockey.

The track "From Stardust to Sentience" was listed as the 417th best song of the 2000s by Pitchfork Media.

== Reception ==
Professional ratings
Aggregate scores
| Source | Rating |
|---|---|
| Metacritic | 75/100 |
Review scores
| Source | Rating |
| Allmusic | 4/5 stars |
| cokemachineglow | (favourable) |
| Pitchfork Media | 8.0/10.0 |
| PopMatters | 7/10 |
| Prefix Magazine | 8.5/10.0 |
| Spin | 3.5/5 stars |
| Tiny Mix Tapes | 4/5 marks |

At Metacritic, which assigns a normalised rating out of 100 to reviews from mainstream critics, High Places received an average score of 75 based on eleven reviews, indicating "generally favourable reviews". AllMusic reviewer Tim Sendra said that the album was "hopefully the first of many impressive and inspiring records to come from the duo."

== Track listing ==
1. "The Storm" – 2:51
2. "You in Forty Years" – 1:33
3. "The Tree with the Lights in It" – 2:44
4. "Vision's the First..." – 3:41
5. "Gold Coin" – 3:52
6. "Papaya Year" – 1:43
7. "Namer" – 4:03
8. "Golden" – 2:05
9. "A Field Guide" – 3:59
10. "From Stardust to Sentience" – 3:35
