= Wooden Shjips =

American experimental/psychedelic rock band

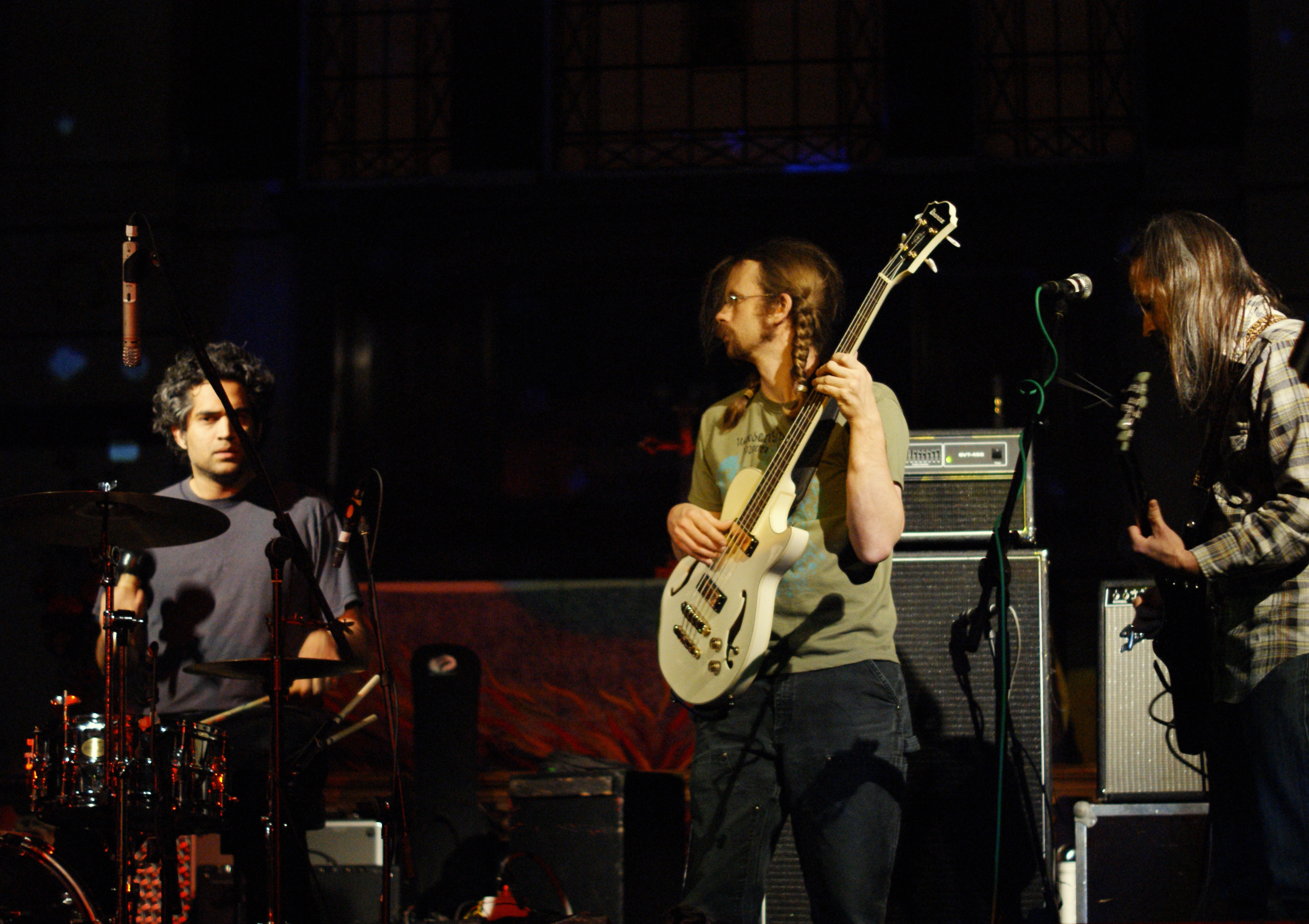
- Wooden Shjips at St Philip's Church, Salford, 2010

Background information
- Origin: San Francisco, United States
- Genres: Psychedelic rock; space rock; shoegaze; experimental rock; alternative rock
- Years active: 2006–present
- Labels: Holy Mountain; Thrill Jockey
- Members: Erik "Ripley" Johnson; Dusty Jermier; Nash Whalen; Omar Ahsanuddin
- Website: Official website

Wooden Shjips (pronounced "ships") is an American experimental and psychedelic rock band from San Francisco, California.

== History ==
The band has released one EP and seven albums. Guitarist Ripley Johnson also plays in two side projects, including Moon Duo, formed in 2009 with Sanae Yamada. The group played at the 2010 All Tomorrow's Parties music festival in Monticello, New York in September 2010 at the request of film director Jim Jarmusch. Johnson has also released solo music under the name Rose City Band, including Sol y Sombra. They are signed to Thrill Jockey records.

== Musical style ==
Their sound has been described as experimental, minimalist, drone rock, and "spacey psychedelic rock". They have been compared to Suicide, Spacemen 3, Loop, The Velvet Underground, The Doors, Soft Machine, Guru Guru, The Black Angels and many more.

== Discography ==
=== Studio albums ===
- Wooden Shjips (2007)
- Dos (2009)
- West (2011)
- Back to Land (2013)
- V. (2018)

=== Compilation albums ===
- Vol. 1 (2008)
- Vol. 2 (2010)

=== Singles and EPs ===
Self-released

- Shrinking Moon For You (2006)
- Holiday Cassingle cs (2008)

via Sick Thirst

- Dance, California (2006)
- SOL '07 (2007)
- European Tour (split with The Heads) [2008]
- Vampire Blues (2008)
- Oh Tennenbaum / Auld Lang Syne (2010)
- Tour of Australia and New Zealand (2010)

via Mexican Summer

- Contact (2009)

via The Great Pop Supplement

- Big City (Demo) / I Believe It (split with Spacemen 3) [2009]

via Sub Pop

- Loose Lips / Start To Dreaming (2007)
