= The Gathering (Arbouretum album) =

Studio album by Arbouretum
- Released: February 15, 2011
- Genre: indie rock
- Length: 43:49
- Label: Thrill Jockey
- Producer: Arbouretum, Matt Boynton

Arbouretum chronology
The Song of the Pearl (2009)	The Gathering (2011)

The Gathering is a 2011 album by the American band Arbouretum. Mojo placed the album at number 27 on its list of "Top 50 albums of 2011" while Uncut placed it at number 49 on its list.

== Track listing ==
1. The White Bird (Arbouretum) 7:09
2. When Delivery Comes (Arbouretum) 4:22
3. Destroying to Save (Arbouretum) 5:07
4. The Highwayman (Webb) 4:13
5. Waxing Crescents (Arbouretum) 7:48
6. The Empty Shell (Arbouretum) 4:33
7. Song of the Nile (Arbouretum) 10:37
