= Wooden Shjips (album) =

Studio album by Wooden Shjips
- Released: 2007
- Genre: Psychedelic rock; space rock
- Label: Holy Mountain Records

Wooden Shjips chronology
| Wooden Shjips (2007) | Vol. 1 (2008) |

Professional ratings
Review scores
| Source | Rating |
|---|---|
| Allmusic | 2.5/5 stars |

Wooden Shjips is the first studio album by space rock band Wooden Shjips. It was released in 2007 by Holy Mountain Records.

The album relies less on distortion when compared to other albums by Wooden Shjips, though it still plays a large role. Despite being labeled as space rock, Wooden Shjips manages to maintain a very distinct sound compared to other space rockers such as Spacemen 3, Comets on Fire or The Flowers of Hell.

== Track listing ==
Side A
| No. | Title | Length |
|---|---|---|
| 1. | "We Ask You To Ride" | 4:53 |
| 2. | "Losin' Time" | 4:18 |
| 3. | "Lucy's Ride" | 6:10 |

Side B
| No. | Title | Length |
|---|---|---|
| 1. | "Blue Sky Bends" | 7:42 |
| 2. | "Shine Like Suns" | 10:18 |
