= V. (album) =

Studio album by Wooden Shjips
- Released: May 25, 2018
- Length: 42:17
- Label: Thrill Jockey

Wooden Shjips chronology
Back to Land (2013)	V. (2018)

Professional ratings
Aggregate scores
Source	Rating
Metacritic	72/100
Review scores
Source	Rating
AllMusic	3.5/5 stars
Blurt	3/5 stars
Drowned in Sound	7/10
Exclaim!	5/10
MusicOMH	4/5 stars
Pitchfork	7.3/10
Under the Radar	7.5/10

V. is the fifth studio album by American psychedelic rock band Wooden Shjips. It was released on May 25, 2018, under Thrill Jockey.

== Critical reception ==
V. was met with "generally favorable" reviews from critics. At Metacritic, which assigns a weighted average rating out of 100 to reviews from mainstream publications, this release received an average score of 72, based on 14 reviews. Aggregator Album of the Year gave the release a 69 out of 100 based on a critical consensus of 10 reviews.

== Track listing ==
V track listing
No.	Title	Length
1.	"Eclipse"	6:23
2.	"In the Fall"	5:36
3.	"Red Line"	5:13
4.	"Already Gone"	4:20
5.	"Staring at the Sun"	7:27
6.	"Golden Flower"	6:03
7.	"Ride On"	7:15
