= Arbouretum =

American alternative rock band

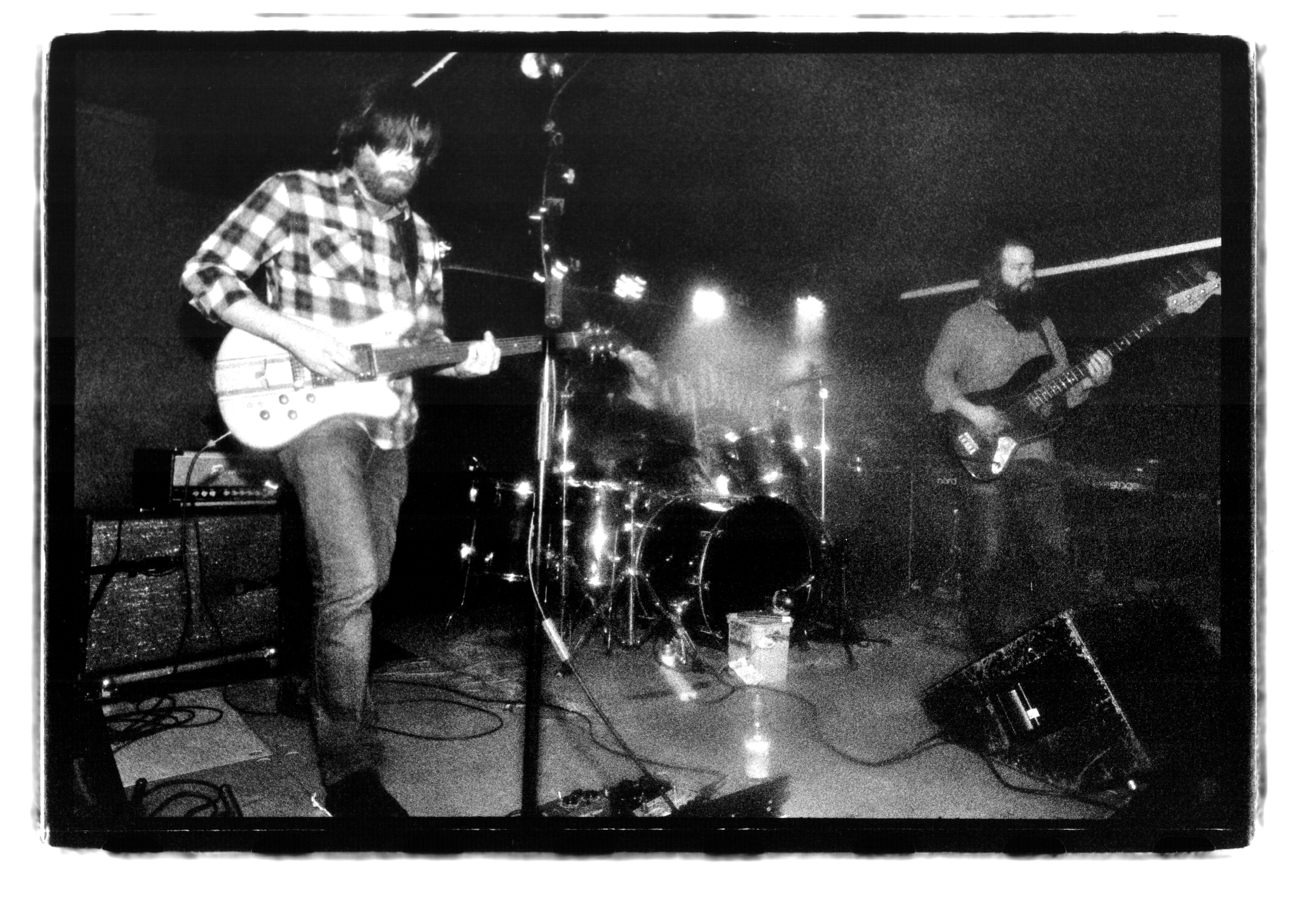
- Arbouretum in concert in 2011

Background information
- Origin: Baltimore, Maryland, United States
- Genre: Alternative rock
- Years active: 2002–present
- Label: Thrill Jockey
- Members: Dave Heumann; Corey Allender; Matthew Pierce; Brian Carey
- Past members: Daniel Franz; Steve Strohmeier; Walker David Teret; Mitchell Feldstein

Arbouretum is an American alternative rock band started by musician Dave Heumann in 2002. They have released ten albums, four of them on Thrill Jockey Records.

== Discography ==
=== Albums ===
- Long Live the Well-Doer (2004)
- Rites of Uncovering (2007)
- Song of the Pearl (2009)
- Sister Ray (2010)
- The Gathering (2011)
- Covered In Leaves (2012)
- A Gourd Of Gold (2013)
- Coming Out of the Fog (2013)
- Song of the Rose (2017)
- Let It All In (2020)

=== EPs ===
- Kale (2008) EP split with Pontiak
- Aureola (2012) EP split with Hush Arbors
