= Wrekmeister Harmonies =

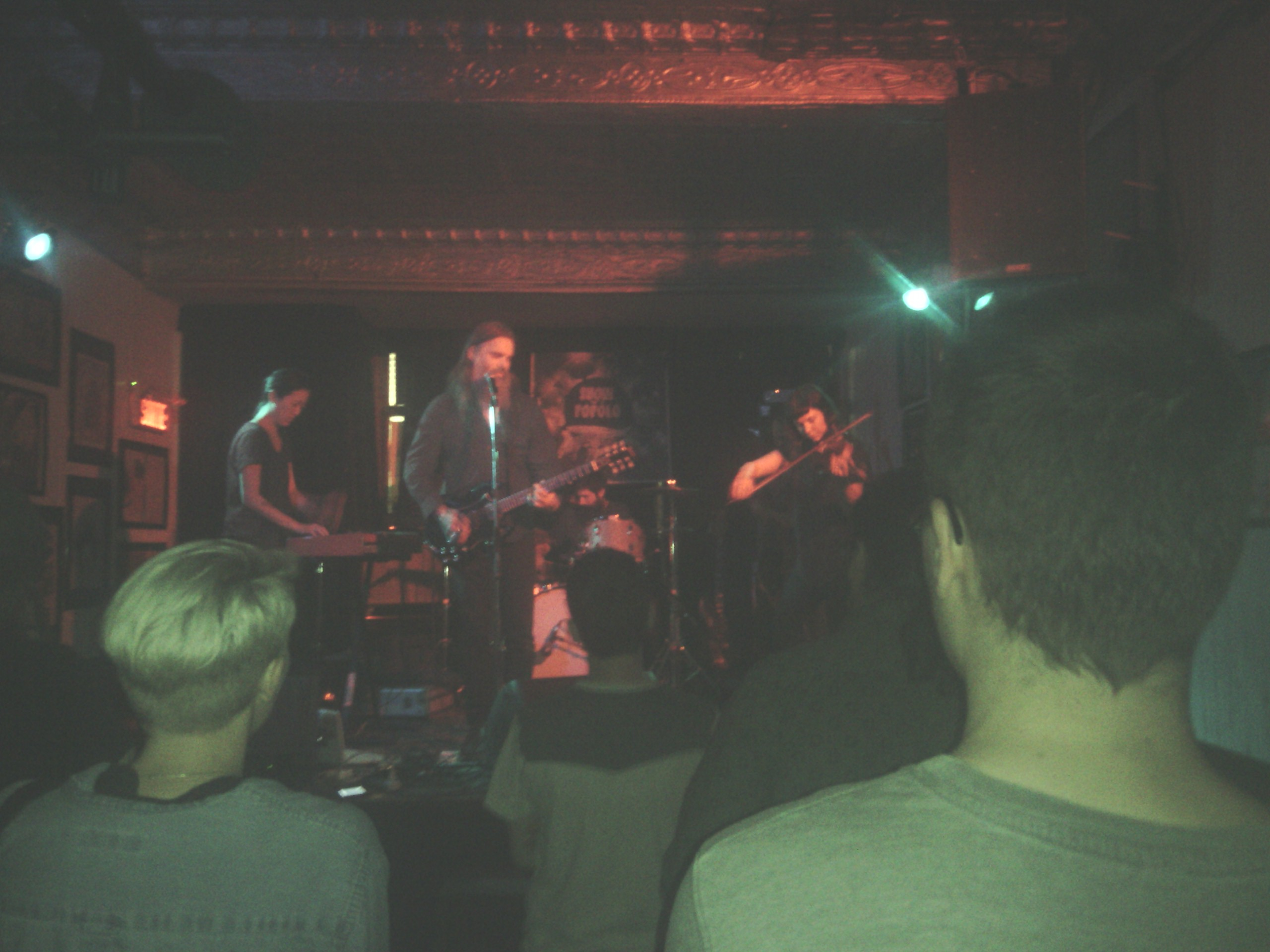

Background information
- Origin: Chicago
- Genres: Rock
- Years active: 2006-present
- Labels: Thrill Jockey

Wrekmeister Harmonies, led by musician and composer JR Robinson, is an experimental music collective from Chicago. Named after the Béla Tarr movie Werckmeister Harmonies, it combines elements of drone music, serialism, post-rock, and heavy metal. Wrekmeister Harmonies typically performs a single composition, often almost an hour in length, beginning with a slow build, shifting into a cathartic middle section, concluding with either a peaceful or disquieting resolution.

== Critical response ==
In 2013, Wrekmeister Harmonies was signed to independent label Thrill Jockey, toured internationally with Grails and headlined in Europe.

Wrekmeister Harmonies' albums have been featured in year-end lists of major publications and were praised by music critics. Saby Reyes-Kulkarni of Pitchfork Media rated "Night of Your Ascension" as 7.8/10 and listed it among his top ten metal albums of 2015. John Doran of The Quietus included "Then It All Came Down" among his "Quietus Albums of the Year 2014". Spin selected “You've Always Meant So Much to Me” as one of the “20 Best Metal Albums of 2013,” and Grayson Currin of Pitchfork rated the album as 7.9/10. Andy Gensler of the Village Voice listed “Recordings Made in Public Spaces” as one of the top 10 Pazz and Jop albums of 2009.

== Notable venues ==
Wrekmeister Harmonies is known for bringing major metal artists to perform in unconventional venues, such as the Andy Warhol Museum, the Solomon R. Guggenheim Museum, the J. Paul Getty Museum, the Pompidou Center, the Museum of Contemporary Art in Chicago, the Golden Gate Bridge in San Francisco and Chicago's Bohemian National Cemetery.

== Individuals associated with Wrekmeister Harmonies ==
- JR Robinson
- The Body
- Esther Shaw
- Jef Whitehead
- Sanford Parker
- Mark Solotroff
- Bruce Lamont
- Jaime Fennelly
- Nandini Khaund
- Billie Howard
- Chanel Pease
- Andrew Markuszewski
- Lydia Lane Stout
- Kate Spelling
- Solomon Snyder
- Anne Patterson
- Tom Hernández
- Fred Lonberg-Holm
- Julie Pomerleau
- Chris Brokaw
- David Yow
- Ken Vandermark
- Keefe Jackson

== Discography ==
- Recordings Made in Public Spaces, Volume 1 (2009) Atavistic
- You've Always Meant So Much to Me (2013) Thrill Jockey
- Then It All Came Down (2014) Thrill Jockey
- Night of Your Ascension (2015) Thrill Jockey
- Light Falls (2016) Thrill Jockey
- The Alone Rush (2018) Thrill Jockey
- We Love to Look at the Carnage (2020) Thrill Jockey
- Flowers in the Spring (2025) Thrill Jockey
