= Lost in the Glare =

Studio album by Barn Owl
- Released: September 13, 2011
- Length: 41:45
- Label: Thrill Jockey
- Producer: Phil Manley

Barn Owl chronology
Ancestral Star (2010)	Lost in the Glare (2011)	V (2013)

Professional ratings
Aggregate scores
Source	Rating
Metacritic	84/100
Review scores
Source	Rating
AllMusic	4/5 stars
MusicOMH	4/5 stars
Prefix	8/10

Lost in the Glare is the seventh studio album by American musical duo Barn Owl. It was released on September 13, 2011 by Thrill Jockey.

== Critical reception ==
Lost in the Glare was met with "universal acclaim" reviews from critics. At Metacritic, which assigns a weighted average rating out of 100 to reviews from mainstream publications, this release received an average score of 84 based on 5 reviews.

In a review for AllMusic, critic reviewer Thom Jurek wrote: "Over eight cuts and 41 minutes, Lost in the Glare reveals itself to be the most dynamic and diverse record in Barn Owl's oeuvre thus far, though it may not seem that way initially. With slow, plodding, brooding drums by Jacob Felix Heule, the distortion and long, deliberately strung-out single-line melody followed by an amped-up series of chord changes makes it the most obviously post-psych thing they've recorded to date." Adrian Dziewanski of Dusted Magazine said: "Lost in the Glare, Barn Owl's seventh album proper and second since they've signed with Thrill Jockey, is the culmination of a sound that the core members of the band, Jon Porras and Evan Caminiti, have stuck to since the beginning. Delicately thrummed and confidently plucked guitars, raga-infused tonalities and vocal drones make up the core of this sound.

== Track listing ==
Lost in the Glare track listing
No.	Title	Writer(s)	Length
1.	"Pale Star"	Jon Porras	4:24
2.	"Turiya"	Porras	4:05
3.	"Devotion I"	Porras	5:56
4.	"The Darkest Night Since 1683"	Porras	7:34
5.	"Temple of the Winds"	Porras	3:24
6.	"Midnight Tide"	Porras	5:16
7.	"Light Echoes"	Porras	6:08
8.	"Devotion II"	Porras	4:58

iTunes bonus track version
No.	Title	Length
9.	"Opening Night Sky"

== Personnel ==
Barn Owl members

- Evan Caminiti – guitar, organ, vocals
- Jon Porras – guitar, piano

Additional musicians

- Steve Dye – clarinet
- Michael Elrod – gong, tanpura
- Jacob Felix Heule – drums

Production

- Phil Manley – engineer, producer
- Rashad Becker − mastering

Cover Art

- David Muench
