= Dan Friel (musician) =

American electronic musician

- Origin: Brooklyn
- Genres: Outsider house
- Instruments: keyboards, guitar, electronics

Dan Friel is an American electronic musician based in Brooklyn. Friel was a founding member of Parts & Labor and played with the group until its dissolution in 2012. He began self-releasing solo recordings in 2001, and has since released music on Thrill Jockey Records, Important Records and Night People. In 2005, Friel co-founded Cardboard Records, an independent record label that has released albums by Gowns, Ecstatic Sunshine, Pterodactyl and others. In addition to his own projects, Friel has performed with Tyondai Braxton, Glenn Branca, Damo Suzuki, and Ui. As a solo artist Friel has played or toured with EMA, Fuck Buttons, Dan Deacon, Black Dice, Titus Andronicus, Lightning Bolt, and Dirty Projectors. In 2012, he worked on a string quartet commissioned by the new music ensemble ETHEL. He is currently fronting the band Upper Wilds.

== Discography ==
- Broken Man Going To Work EP (self-released, 2001)
- Sunburn EP (Velocirecords, 2004)
- Obsoleter EP (Night People, 2006)
- Ghost Town LP (Important Records, 2008)
- Valedictorian/Exoskeleton EP (Thrill Jockey, 2012)
- Total Folklore LP (Thrill Jockey, 2013)
- Life LP (Thrill Jockey, 2015)
- Fanfare (2019)
- Factoryland (2022)

== General references ==
- The Village Voice
- Review, The New York Times
- Review, Allmusic
- Review Consequence of Sound
- Review, Tiny Mix Tapes
- Review, Pitchfork Media
- Review, No Ripcord
- Review, Pop Matters
- Review, Exclaim!
