= Don't Look Away (Alexander Tucker album) =

Studio album by Alexander Tucker
- Released: 24 August 2018
- Length: 38:40
- Label: Thrill Jockey

Alexander Tucker chronology
Third Mouth (2012)	Don't Look Away (2018)	Guild of the Asbestos Weaver (2019)

Professional ratings
Aggregate scores
Source	Rating
Metacritic	84/100
Review scores
Source	Rating
AllMusic	4/5 stars
The Line of Best Fit	8/10

Don't Look Away is a studio album by English musician Alexander Tucker. It was released on 24 August 2018 through Thrill Jockey.

The album is the third in a trilogy, made previous by Dorwytch (2011) and Third Mouth (2012).

== Accolades ==
Publication	Accolade	Rank	Ref.
The Quietus	Top 100 Albums of 2018	48	

== Track listing ==
No.	Title	Length
1.	"Objects"	3:07
2.	"Sisters and Me"	2:41
3.	"Visiting Again"	4:27
4.	"Boys Names"	2:04
5.	"The Saddest Summer 2"	2:04
6.	"Ghost on the Ledge"	2:44
7.	"Gloops Void (Give It Up)"	5:27
8.	"Behind the Shoulder"	3:42
9.	"A to Z"	2:51
10.	"Citadel"	2:52
11.	"Yesterday's Honey"	1:57
12.	"Ishuonawayishanawa"	4:44
