= Colleen et les Boîtes à Musique =

EP by Colleen
- Released: October 2, 2006
- Recorded: 2004–2006 in Glasgow and Paris
- Genre: Electronica
- Length: 38:59
- Label: The Leaf Label BAY53
- Producer: Cécile Schott

Colleen chronology
Mort Aux Vaches (2006)	Colleen et les Boîtes à Musique (2006)	Les Ondes Silencieuses (2007)

Professional ratings
Review scores
Source	Rating
The Guardian	3/5 stars

Colleen et les Boîtes à Musique is a 14-track EP by French electronica artist Colleen (real name Cécile Schott) released on October 2, 2006. It was recorded between 2004 and January 2006 for the atelier de création radiophonique of France Culture, a national radio station, to be played back in a special broadcast. Schott was pleased with the results and soon decided to also release the recordings as an EP. This EP became her second release of 2006, acting as successor to the Mort Aux Vaches live album released in January.

Thirteen of the fourteen tracks were made entirely using music boxes, accounting for the EP's name which translates into English as "Colleen and the Music Boxes". The exception was track 14, "I'll Read You a Story", which also included classical guitar and could be found on the 2005 album The Golden Morning Breaks. The enhanced CD also included a video for this track.

== Track listing ==
All songs were composed and played by Cécile Schott.

1. "John Levers the Ratchet" – 0:30
2. "What is a Componium?" (Part 1) – 6:44
3. "Charles's Birthday Card" – 0:47
4. "Will You Gamelan for Me?" – 3:01
5. "The Sad Panther" – 1:52
6. "Under the Roof" – 3:09
7. "What is a Componium?" (Part 2) – 3:05
8. "A Bear is Trapped" – 1:04
9. "Please Gamelan Again" – 2:30
10. "Your Heart is so Loud" – 3:56
11. "Calypso in a Box" – 0:47
12. "Bicycle Bells" – 2:28
13. "Happiness Nuggets" – 2:13
14. "I'll Read You a Story" – 6:49 – A video is also included on the enhanced CD.

== Credits ==
=== Instrumentation ===
- Cécile Schott – music box (tracks 1–14) and classical guitar (track 14).

=== Production credits ===
- Composed by Cécile Schott
- Produced by Cécile Schott
- Recorded by John Cavanagh (tracks 1, 3–4, 6, 8–9, 11–13) and Cécile Schott (all other tracks)
- Mastering by Emiliano Flores
- Artwork by Iker Spozio
