= Sol y Sombra (album) =

Studio album by Rose City Band
- Released: January 24, 2025
- Length: 42:08
- Label: Thrill Jockey
- Producer: Barry Walker; Paul Hasenberg; John Jeffrey; Sanae Yamada

Rose City Band chronology
Garden Party (2023)	Sol y Sombra (2025)

Singles from Sol y Sombra
- 1. "Lights on the Way" Released: October 9, 2024

Sol y Sombra is the fifth studio album of Rose City Band, a project of American singer Ripley Johnson. It was released on January 24, 2025, through Thrill Jockey. The lead single from the album, "Lights on the Way", was released on October 9, 2024.

== Reception ==
Professional ratings
Review scores
Source	Rating
AllMusic	4/5 stars

Relix wrote in its review for the album, "the recipe remains the same on Sol y Sombra, which again features Barry Walker Jr.'s sublimely supple pedal-steel stylings alongside Johnson's silky solos," referring to Johnson's "laid-back, front-porch approach," while AllMusic stated "the heightened production and detours into previously untraveled styles all slowly contribute to this chapter being both a continuation and a gentle expansion of Johnson's warped, beautiful, and ongoing vision of space-age country music."

Glide Magazine reviewed the album, stating "Sol Y Sombra attempts to balance where the band is heading and where they have been, all while trying to make sense of the present moment."

BrooklynVegan stated "The magic on this album, and Rose City Band, lies with the interplay between Johnson and pedal steel player Barry Walker who, coupled with the album’s sweet melodies, create their own radiant light."

Sol y Sombra was described by Uncut as "Just gorgeous" and Mojo as "yet another beauty."

== Track listing ==
No.	Title	Length
1.	"Lights on the Way"	4:32
2.	"Open Roads"	2:32
3.	"Rolling Gold"	4:23
4.	"Evergreen"	4:12
5.	"Sunlight Daze"	5:57
6.	"Radio Song"	5:02
7.	"Seeds of Light"	4:42
8.	"La Mesa"	2:07
9.	"Wheels"	4:37
10.	"The Walls"	4:04
Total length:		42:08

== Personnel ==
=== Rose City Band ===
- John Jeffrey – drums, percussion, bass on "Lights on the Way"
- Barry Walker – pedal steel guitar, backing vocals
- Paul Hasenberg – keyboards
- Sanae Yamada – backing vocals, synthesizer on "La Mesa"
- Ripley Johnson – guitars, vocals, bass, piano, mandolin, percussion

=== Additional contributors ===
- Colin Stewart – mixing, drum recording
- Amy Brages – mastering
- Taylor Rushing – artwork, design
