= The Zincs =

- Founded: 2000
- Founder: James Elkington
- Distributor(s): Thrill Jockey Records
- Country of origin: United States
- Location: Chicago, Illinois

The Zincs are a four-piece band originally from London, England, and now based in Chicago, Illinois, US. They are signed to Chicago's Thrill Jockey Records.

== History ==
The Zincs were organized by English singer-songwriter James Elkington in 2000. His first album, Moth and Marriage, was released by the Ohio Gold label in 2001 and was performed by Elkington alone, but a band was formed to play the subsequent shows, and the Zincs proper were born.

The current lineup features Elkington's voice and guitar, Nathaniel Braddock on guitar (Ancient Greeks, Edith Frost, and the OBDBI), Nick Macri on bass (Bobby Conn, Euphone, Mark Eitzel and co-runs the Ohio Gold label) and Jason Toth (Edith Frost), Manieshevitz).

2002 saw the release of an EP, Forty Winks with the Zincs, but the full band did not record together until the album dimmer, which was released by Chicago's own Thrill Jockey in 2005. They were accompanied by Janet Bean from Freakwater (vocals), and Fred Lonberg-Holm and Susan Voelz (strings); recording was handled by Mark Greenberg and Barry Phipps.

After spending most of 2006 touring the U.S.A. and Europe, The Zincs convened to record their third album, Black Pompadour, with John McEntire (Tortoise and lots of things) at Soma EMS. The album was released on 20 March 2007.

== Discography ==
- Black Pompadour – thrill 178 (2007)
- dimmer – thrill 151 (2005)
- Forty Winks with the Zincs – CA-001 (2004)
- Moth and Marriage – OHAU-009 (2001)
