= 03/07–09/07 =

03/07-09/07

Compilation album by High Places
- Released: July 22, 2008
- Genre: Psychedelic pop
- Length: 28:49
- Label: Thrill Jockey

High Places chronology
| High Places (2008) | 03/07-09/07 (2008) |

03/07–09/07 is a compilation released by the Brooklyn indie band High Places. The album was released on July 22, 2008.

== Reception ==
Professional ratings
Aggregate scores
| Source | Rating |
|---|---|
| Metacritic | 81/100 |
Review scores
| Source | Rating |
| AllMusic | 3.5/5 stars |
| Cokemachineglow | 77% |
| Drowned in Sound | 8/10 |
| The Line of Best Fit | 82% |
| Record Collector | 3/5 stars |
| Pitchfork | 8.3/10 |
| Under the Radar | 7/10 |

== Track listing ==
| No. | Title | Length |
|---|---|---|
| 1. | "Head Spins" (Extended version) | 2:19 |
| 2. | "Sandy Feat" (7" version) | 2:38 |
| 3. | "Banana Slugs/Cosmonaut" | 4:51 |
| 4. | "Shared Islands" | 4:07 |
| 5. | "Universe" | 4:04 |
| 6. | "Greeting the Light" | 2:08 |
| 7. | "Granola" | 1:49 |
| 8. | "Freaked Flight" (Alternate version) | 1:56 |
| 9. | "Jump In (For Gilkey Elementary School)" | 2:15 |
| 10. | "Canary" | 2:47 |
