= Upper Wilds =

- Upper Wilds in 2018

Background information
- Origin: Brooklyn, NY, United States
- Genre: Noise rock
- Years active: 2016-present
- Label: Thrill Jockey
- Members: Dan Friel; Jason Binnick; Jeff Ottenbacher
- Past members: Zach Lehrhoff; Aaron Siegel
- Website: upperwilds.com

Upper Wilds are an American noise rock band formed in Brooklyn in 2016 by Dan Friel (Parts & Labor). In 2017 they released their debut album Guitar Noise 2017. The band's work is inspired by astronomy; with the exception of their debut album, all of their albums are named after planets.

== History ==
Frontman Dan Friel was a member of the noise rock band Parts & Labor from their formation in 2002 until their breakup in 2012. In 2013 and 2015, he released two solo albums on which he leaned more toward electronic music. However, Friel missed playing guitar and collaborating with bandmates. In 2016, he put together a few riffs, contacted bassist Zach Lehrhoff (Ex Models) and drummer Aaron Siegel, and founded Upper Wilds. The band’s name came about during a brainstorming session with Friel's wife.

The debut album Guitar Module 2017, on which Friel played all the instruments, was released in 2017. A year later, the band released the album Mars. For this album, the band collaborated with various artists, including Katie Eastburn (Young People) and Mark Shue (Guided by Voices). Siegel had since been replaced by Jeff Ottenbacher; however, he still contributed to the album.

Due to Friel’s fascination with science fiction, the band draws inspiration from the planets of the solar system when naming their albums. Mars was followed by Venus, released in 2021. The songs on this album are titled “Love Song #1” through “Love Song #10,” making the album title a nod to astrology, since the planet is associated with love in that context. Friel had already come up with the idea for Venus shortly after Mars was released. Before the recording of Venus, bassist Lehrhoff had been replaced by Jason Binnick (The Flesh), who had previously worked with the band on Mars.

In 2023, Upper Wilds released Jupiter. The album features a cover of "Books About UFOs" by Hüsker Dü, a band known for combining volume, energy, and pop hooks. Starting in August, the band performed several times with Pelican in the Midwest. As part of their tour along the West Coast, Upper Wilds did two shows with Psychic Graveyard. In 2026, Upper Wilds’ fifth album, Mercury, was announced. The album was released on August 28.

== Discography ==
=== Albums ===
- Guitar Module 2017, 2017
- Mars, 2018
- Venus, 2021
- Jupiter, 2023
- Mercury, 2026

=== Ep ===
- Live @ Gold Sounds 11.18.17, 2017

== External link ==
- Official website
