= Inindependence =

Studio album by A Minor Forest
- Released: August 11, 1998
- Recorded: January 5–11, 1998
- Studios: Uber Studios/Treat and Release Studios
- Genres: Math rock, post-rock, noise rock, progressive rock, post-hardcore, slowcore, space rock
- Length: 53:54
- Label: Thrill Jockey
- Producer: A Minor Forest

A Minor Forest chronology
Flemish Altruism (Constituent Parts 1993–1996) (1996)	Inindependence (1998)	...So, Were They in Some Sort of Fight? (1999)

Professional ratings
Review scores
Source	Rating
AllMusic	4/5 stars
Pitchfork	7.7/10

Inindependence is the second studio album by San Francisco-based math rock band A Minor Forest, released in 1998.

== Critical reception ==
The Washington Post thought that "A Minor Forest plays arty, (mostly) instrumental rock whose textures and rhythms derive more from German space-rock than from fusion jazz or early '70s British art-rock."

AllMusic wrote that "Inindependence won't go down as a lost classic per se, but there's more here to enjoy than on many a record released as part of the go-nowhere post-rock haze and craze."

== Track listing ==
All songs written and arranged by A Minor Forest.

No.	Title	Length
1.	"The Dutch Fist"	6:29
2.	"Erik's Budding Romance"	4:21
3.	"Look at That Car, It's Full of Balloons"	8:37
4.	"...It's Salmon!!!"	3:55
5.	"The Smell of Hot"	18:21
6.	"Michael Anthony"	4:57
7.	"Discoier"	7:14
