= Five Style =

5ive Style
- Origin: Chicago, United States
- Years active: 1993–2000
- Label: Sub Pop
- Past members: Billy Dolan; Leroy Bach; John Herndon; Jeremy Jacobsen; Ryan Rapsys

Five Style (a name taken from a martial arts technique called "Five Style Fist"), also known as 5ive Style, was a Chicago-based funk/jam quartet. Their albums were released on the Sub Pop label in the 1990s.

== History ==
The group existed from about 1993-2000 in various incarnations, centered on the guitar work of Billy Dolan (who has also played in Heroic Doses, and The Fire Theft). Other members were major players of the 1990s Chicago music scene and included bassist Leroy Bach (of Chicago funk group Uptighty, the first Liz Phair studio band, and Wilco fame), drummer John Herndon (a.k.a. "Johnny Machine", who made his first appearances on record in Tool of the Man era Poster Children and became established as a longstanding drummer/percussionist in Tortoise), and keyboardist Jeremy Jacobsen (also known as The Lonesome Organist and member of Euphone).

The band's first (self-titled) album, was released in 1995 by Subpop. Miniature Portraits followed in 1999.

Drummer Ryan Rapsys, also of Euphone and Gauge, filled in on drums on a January 2000 tour when they opened for Giant Sand and Vic Chesnutt. 5ive Style were the opening act in a brief May 1996 tour which also included The Sea and Cake and Tortoise.

== Discography ==
=== Albums ===
- 5ive Style (September 1995), Sub Pop
- Miniature Portraits (August 24, 1999), Sub Pop

=== Singles ===
- "Waiting on the Eclipse" / "Summer Salt" (September 13, 1994), Sub Pop SP271
- "Kiki's Cookout" / "Hot Box" (February 28, 1995), Sub Pop SP282
- "She's Humanoid" / "Burning Airlines Give You So Much More" (April 8, 1997), Sub Pop SP394
