= Captain of None =

Studio album by Colleen
- Released: 6 April 2015
- Recorded: March – June 2014
- Label: Thrill Jockey
- Producer: Cecile Schott

Colleen chronology
The Weighing of the Heart (2013)	Captain of None (2015)	A Flame My Love, a Frequency (2017)

Professional ratings
Review scores
Source	Rating
Consequence	B−
Pitchfork	7.6/10

Captain of None is the fifth studio album by French multi-instrumentalist Colleen. It was released on 6 April 2015 by Thrill Jockey records. It was recorded, mixed, and produced entirely by Schott in her music studio in San Sebastián, Spain.

== Critical reception ==
The album has received "generally favorable" reviews from critics. On Metacritic it has an approval rating of 79 out of 100 based on reviews from 12 critics.

== Track listing ==
1. "Holding Horses" – 5:10
2. "I'm Kin" – 6:05
3. "This Hammer Breaks" – 6:03
4. "Salina Stars" – 3:39
5. "Lighthouse" – 6:38
6. "Soul Alphabet" – 4:54
7. "Eclipse" – 4:00
8. "Captain of None" – 5:57
