= Guild of the Asbestos Weaver =

Studio album by Alexander Tucker
- Released: 23 August 2019
- Genre: Avant-pop
- Length: 39:40
- Label: Thrill Jockey

Alexander Tucker chronology
Don't Look Away (2018)	Guild of the Asbestos Weaver (2019)

Professional ratings
Aggregate scores
Source	Rating
Metacritic	74/100
Review scores
Source	Rating
AllMusic	3.5/5 stars
MusicOMH	3/5 stars

Guild of the Asbestos Weaver is the eighth studio album by English musician Alexander Tucker. It was released on 23 August 2019 by Thrill Jockey.

The album is inspired by the 1953 novel Fahrenheit 451 by Ray Bradbury, and references H. P. Lovecraft and Alan Moore.

== Critical reception ==
Guild of the Asbestos Weaver was met with generally favorable reviews from critics. At Metacritic, which assigns a weighted average rating out of 100 to reviews from mainstream publications, this release received an average score of 74, based on 7 reviews.

== Track listing ==
No.	Title	Length
1.	"Energy Alphas"	7:21
2.	"Artificial Origin"	9:05
3.	"Montag"	5:48
4.	"Precog"	7:06
5.	"Cryonic"	10:20
