= House and Land (album) =

Studio album by House and Land
- Released: June 16, 2017
- Genre: Americana
- Length: 34:17
- Label: Thrill Jockey

House and Land chronology
House and Land (2017)	Across the Field (2019)

Professional ratings
Aggregate scores
Source	Rating
Metacritic	83/100
Review scores
Source	Rating
Pitchfork	7.8/10 stars
The Vinyl District	A

House and Land is the first studio album by American duo House and Land. It was released on June 16, 2017 on Thrill Jockey. The album received positive reviews and was named the 25th best album of 2017 by Magnet magazine.

== Track listing ==
No.	Title	Length
1.	"Wandering Boy"	2:49
2.	"Guide Me O Thou Great Jehovah"	2:14
3.	"False True Lover"	3:48
4.	"Listen to the Roll"	2:59
5.	"The Day is Past and Gone"	5:53
6.	"Home Over Yonder"	3:42
7.	"Johnny"	2:16
8.	"Rich Old Jade"	3:42
9.	"Feather Dove"	3:11
10.	"Unquiet Grave"	3:42
