= 5ive Style (album) =

Studio album by 5ive Style
- Released: 1995
- Genre: Instrumental rock
- Length: 38:03
- Label: Sub Pop

Five Style chronology
5ive Style (1995)	Miniature Portraits (1999)

5ive Style is the debut studio album by 5ive Style, released in 1995 by Sub Pop.

== Critical reception ==
Professional ratings
Review scores
Source	Rating
AllMusic	4/5 stars
NME	6/10

The Wisconsin State Journal wrote that 5ive Style "knows how to play with the [instrumental rock] genre and offer material that stands on its own without lyrics, fancy solos or cookie-cutter arrangements." Guitar Player noted that "the Meters are probably 5ive Style's closest antecedent, but the band also incorporates shades of early ska and new wave, dub reggae, Zeppelin's funkier moments, and the mighty JB's."

== Track listing ==
All music is composed by 5ive Style.

No.	Title	Length
1.	"Deep Marsh"	3:16
2.	"Hard Afro Rubalon"	4:51
3.	"Once Around the Park"	2:15
4.	"Round Up"	4:58
5.	"I Told Ya"	3:21
6.	"Outta Space Canoe Race"	2:50
7.	"Apple Pie"	6:00
8.	"Waiting on the Eclipse"	2:46
9.	"Freddy Flakeout"	3:23
10.	"Sure Is Hot"	4:23

== Personnel ==
Adapted from the 5ive Style liner notes.

5ive Style

- Leroy Bach – bass guitar, guitar, keyboards
- Bill Dolan – guitar
- John Herndon – drums, painting
- Jeremy Jacobsen – keyboards

Production and additional personnel

- Jeff Kleinsmith – design
- John McEntire – mixing, recording
- Casey Rice – mixing, recording

== Release history ==
Region	Date	Label	Format	Catalog
United States	1995	Sub Pop	CD, LP	SP 309
