= Colleen (musician) =

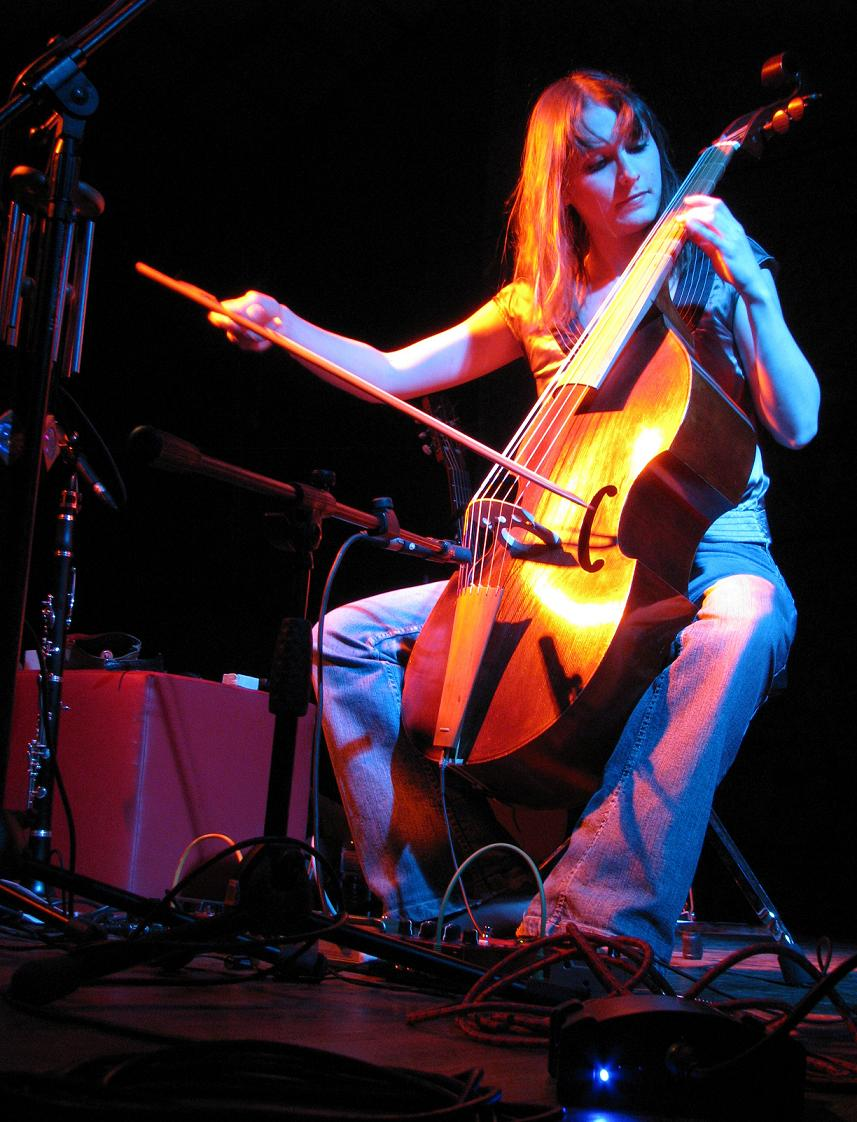
- Colleen performing in 2008

Background information
- Also known as: Cécile Schott
- Born: 1976 (age 49–50); Montargis, France
- Genres: Ambient, experimental
- Occupations: Musician, composer
- Years active: 2001–present
- Label: The Leaf Label
- Website: colleenplays.org

Cécile Schott (born 1976), known professionally as Colleen, is a French composer of electronic and ambient music based in Barcelona.

== Early life ==
Cécile Schott was born and raised in Montargis, France, outside of Paris. Before music, she devoted most of her time to literature. She first picked up a guitar in high school and subsequently joined a noise pop group. She studied English at the University of Burgundy, and thus moved to England for two years.

She moved to Paris in 1999. She now resides in Barcelona. She was an English teacher in Poissy (lycée Charles de Gaulle) until she resigned in 2007.

== Music ==
Schott began making music under the name 'Colleen' in 2001, after a friend gave her a CD-R containing ACID Pro music production software. Samples were a common part of her early work and in summer 2003 the debut album Everyone Alive Wants Answers was released. It was notable for its heavy use of looped samples, which were taken from records in her collection and heavily modified. The album was critically well received and drew enough attention to warrant touring. During live shows, Schott would replicate the sounds from the album using acoustic instruments played through pedals as she thought the idea of using a laptop live was uninspiring.

This approach using live physical instruments led to the 2005 follow-up, The Golden Morning Breaks, which retained the looped style present in earlier work but was something of a departure from the sampled setting of Everyone Alive Wants Answers. Instead the album consisted almost entirely of natural, non-synthetic sounds, an approach Schott has stated in interviews that she prefers.

In January 2006 Schott released a live album as part of the Staalplaat label's series of live performances, called Mort Aux Vaches (meaning 'Death to Cows'). A second 2006 release in October, a 14-track EP called Colleen et les Boîtes à Musique ('Colleen and the Music Boxes'), was composed entirely using music boxes.

In May 2007, dancer and choreographer Perrine Valli performed Série, a production with an original score composed by Schott - her first foray into dance.

Les Ondes Silencieuses ('The Silent Waves'), Colleen's third full-length album, was released on 21 May 2007. A slight evolution in sound was again heard on the album, as Schott adopted a more free-form approach in place of the use of loops that were so apparent in much of her prior output.

Despite an earlier aversion to "words in music", she released her first album with lyrics, The Weighing of the Heart, in 2013. Her next three albums also featured her singing. She returned to purely instrumental music with her 2023 album Le jour et la nuit du réel.

== Critical reception ==
Colleen's albums have been reviewed regularly by Pitchfork. Reviewing Everyone Alive Wants Answers, Rob Mitchum wrote that it had him "quick-drawing on the 'unlike anything I've heard' cliché". Nitsuh Abebe described The Golden Morning Breaks, at its most effective, as "something simple, beautiful, and coherent, something that feels remarkably imaginative but entirely unpremeditated". The magazine's review of Les Ondes Silencieuses described "string-and-wind meditations that harken back 400 years, yet seem tailored for today", and Matthew Murphy noted that on Captain of None she used the treble viola da gamba "in particularly inventive ways". Writing in The Quietus, Joseph Burnett said that Captain of None "probably pushes the envelope quite a bit further". Chal Ravens described A Flame My Love, a Frequency as "an electronic reflection on mortality" written in the wake of the 2015 Paris attacks, adding that "her sound is lighter than ever". PopMatters called Le jour et la nuit du réel both "a departure" and "a natural progression".

== Discography ==
=== Studio albums ===
- Everyone Alive Wants Answers – 30 June 2003 – The Leaf Label
- The Golden Morning Breaks – 23 May 2005 – The Leaf Label
- Mort Aux Vaches – 25 January 2006 – Staalplaat – Live album, limited to 500 copies.
- Les Ondes Silencieuses – 21 May 2007 – The Leaf Label
- The Weighing of the Heart – 13 May 2013 – Second Language Music
- Captain of None – 6 April 2015 – Thrill Jockey
- A Flame My Love, a Frequency – 20 October 2017 – Thrill Jockey
- The Tunnel and the Clearing – 21 May 2021 – Thrill Jockey
- Le jour et la nuit du réel – 22 September 2023 – Thrill Jockey
- Libres antes del final – 20 March 2026 – Thrill Jockey

=== EPs ===
- Colleen et les Boîtes à Musique – 2 October 2006 – The Leaf Label
- A Flame Variations (Live in the Moog Sound Lab) – 24 October 2019 – Bandcamp-only release

=== Singles ===
From Everyone Alive Wants Answers:

- "Babies" – 2002 – Active Suspension

== See also ==
- List of ambient music artists
