= ...So, Were They in Some Sort of Fight? =

Compilation album by A Minor Forest
- Released: October 5, 1999
- Recorded: 1993 – Sep 1998
- Genre: Math rock
- Length: 140:38
- Label: My Pal God
- Producer: A Minor Forest

A Minor Forest chronology
Inindependence (1998)	...So, Were They in Some Sort of Fight? (1999)

...So, Were They in Some Sort of Fight? is a compilation album and the final release by San Francisco-based math rock band A Minor Forest, released on Oct 5, 1999, by the My Pal God label.

== Track listing ==
Disc One
No.	Title	Length
1.	"No One Likes an Old Baby"	4:15
2.	"Fatal Wound" (Uncle Tupelo cover)	6:40
3.	"Cocktail Party"	7:02
4.	"...So, Were They in Some Sort of Fight?"	5:57
5.	"Three Long Piles"	7:06
6.	"Putting the Gay Back in Reggae"	1:04
7.	"Five Bucks on Pump Number Seven"	8:55
8.	"Wussy"	4:45
9.	"Intercontinental Stalker (And So Does the Wolf Whistle)"	6:54
10.	"Disco Party"	8:57
11.	"The Ball Window"	6:45
Total length:		68:20

Disc Two
No.	Title	Length
1.	"John Gets Leftovers Again"	2:21
2.	"Well Swayed"	10:58
3.	"(Talking to the) Man From Lusk"	7:16
4.	"Fuck the Hours"	5:30
5.	"Fatal E's" (Dave Cerf remix)	3:29
6.	"Water Song"	4:39
7.	"Armigh Is a Hovercraft"	3:40
8.	"Speed for Gavin (As Interpreted by J Lesser)"	6:04
9.	"Lady" (Little River Band cover)	2:21
10.	"The Convent"	21:07
11.	"Shaggy Parasol"	4:53
Total length:		72:18

== Personnel ==
- A.M.F. – Engineer
- Matt Anderson – Engineer
- John Benson – Bass, Clarinet, Guitar, Vocals, Music Box
- Loren Chasse – Remixing
- Andee Connors – Bass, Drums, Vocals, Slide Guitar
- Dominique Davison – Cello
- Andy Ernst – Mixing
- David Franklin – Photography
- Erik Hoversten – Bass, Guitar, Vocals, Guitorgan
- Little River Band – Engineer
- Keif San Augustin – Assistant Engineer
- Kurt Schlegel – Engineer
- Bart Thurber – Engineer, Mixing
- Uncle Tupelo – Engineer
