= Mort Aux Vaches (Colleen album) =

Studio album by Colleen
- Released: January 25, 2006
- Recorded: September 2004 in the VPRO studios
- Genre: Ambient
- Length: 38:43
- Label: Staalplaat MAV055

Colleen chronology
The Golden Morning Breaks (2005)	Mort Aux Vaches (2006)	Colleen et les Boîtes à Musique (2006)

Mort Aux Vaches is a full-length session recording from ambient music artist Colleen, released in 2006 as part of the Mort Aux Vaches music series. Keeping with the style of the series the album is packaged in a hardback case wrapped in textured wallpaper and fastened with a safety pin. It was limited to 500 copies.

== Track listing ==
1. "A Little Mechanical Waltz" – 2:35
2. "The Zither Song" – 5:13
3. "The Bowing Song" – 3:44
4. "The Melodica Song" – 8:02
5. "The Thumb Piano Song" – 5:33
6. "The Ukulele Song" – 3:39
7. "The Cello Song" – 3:34
8. "Petite Fleur" – 6:23
