= A Minor Forest =

American math rock band

- Origin: San Francisco, California, U.S.
- Genres: Math rock; post-rock; punk rock; noise rock; indie rock
- Years active: 1992–1998; 2013–2014
- Labels: Thrill Jockey; My Pal God
- Past members: Erik Hoversten; Andee Connors; John Trevor Benson; Dominique Davidson

A Minor Forest was a San Francisco-based math rock band active from 1992 to 1998.

== History ==
The band formed after Andee Connors left his home in San Diego to start a career in music in the San Francisco Bay Area. After a brief stint in Cradlestone RIP and the Sutter Valley Claimjumpers (as Sandee Shotgun), In 1992, he met bassist John Trevor Benson and guitarist Erik Hoversten, forming the band.

Their songs incorporated elements of pop, progressive rock, and punk rock. The group released three albums: Flemish Altruism (1996) and Inindependence (1998) on Chicago label Thrill Jockey, and So, Were They in Some Sort of Fight? (1999), a career-spanning compilation on My Pal God records. On November 9, 2013, they played for the first time in 15 years at Bottom of the Hill in San Francisco. Until that show, their most recent performance was held on November 1, 1998, at the Great American Music Hall in San Francisco.

== Members ==
- Erik Hoversten
- Andee Connors
- John Trevor Benson
- Dominique Davison

== Discography ==
- Flemish Altruism (Constituent Parts 1993-1996) CD (Thrill Jockey, 1996)
- Inindependence CD (Thrill Jockey, 1998)
- ...So, Were They in Some Sort of Fight? double CD (My Pal God, 1999)
