= Flemish Altruism (Constituent Parts 1993–1996) =

Studio album by A Minor Forest
- Released: 1996
- Recorded: August 17–18, 1995; June 3–5, 1996
- Genre: Hardcore
- Length: 73:19
- Label: Thrill Jockey
- Producers: A Minor Forest; Steve Albini; Bob Weston

A Minor Forest chronology
Flemish Altruism (Constituent Parts 1993–1996) (1996)	Inindependence (1998)

Alternate Cover
- Cover art for the 2014 remaster

Flemish Altruism (Constituent Parts 1993–1996) is the debut studio album by the San Francisco-based band A Minor Forest. Some tracks were recorded in 1995 by Steve Albini and some in 1996 by Bob Weston. It was released on the Thrill Jockey label. The album was remastered in 2014.

== Critical reception ==
Professional ratings
Review scores
Source	Rating
AllMusic	4/5 stars

AllMusic noted: "For those interested in song-based pop, this is not the right album, but anyone who can settle into a creepy crawl of heavy bass and off-kilter guitars will find this is an excellent work."

== Track listing ==
No.	Title	Length
1.	"...But the Pants Stay On"	6:42
2.	"Bill's Mom Likes to Fuck"	10:23
3.	"Ed Is 50"	4:20
4.	"So Jesus Was at the Last Supper..."	14:00
5.	"Jacking Off George Lucas"	7:07
6.	"Speed for Gavin"	3:59
7.	"Perform the Critical Straw Transfer"	7:48
8.	"Dainty Jack and His Amazing Technicolor Cloth Jacket"	4:08
9.	"Beef Rigger"	6:16
10.	"The Loneliest Enuretic"	8:42

== Personnel ==
A Minor Forest

- Erik Hoversten - guitar, singing, yelling
- John Trevor Benson - bass, singing, talking
- Andee Connors - drumming, yelling
- Dominique Davison - cello on tracks 3, 5, 7, & 9

Additional personnel

- Bob Weston - producer (odd tracks)
- Steve Albini - producer (even tracks)
