= Across the Field (album) =

Studio album by House and Land
- Released: June 14, 2019
- Genre: Folk
- Length: 34:28
- Label: Thrill Jockey

House and Land chronology
| House and Land (2017) | Across the Field (2019) |

Professional ratings
Aggregate scores
| Source | Rating |
|---|---|
| Metacritic | 84/100 |
Review scores
| Source | Rating |
| The Guardian | 4/5 stars |
| PopMatters | 8/10 |
| The Vinyl District | A |

Across the Field is the second studio album by American duo House and Land. It was released on June 14, 2019 on Thrill Jockey, and was named the Folk Album of the Month by The Guardian that month. Its release came two years after their 2017 self title debut record, and included a limited edition primrose vinyl version.

== Track listing ==
| No. | Title | Length |
|---|---|---|
| 1. | "Two Sisters" | 5:07 |
| 2. | "Rainbow 'Mid Life's Willows" | 5:32 |
| 3. | "Cursed Soldier" | 3:12 |
| 4. | "Blacksmith" | 4:55 |
| 5. | "Carolina Lady" | 7:45 |
| 6. | "Precious Jewels" | 2:44 |
| 7. | "Ca the Yowes" | 5:13 |
