= House and Land =

Band specializing in experimental Appalachian music

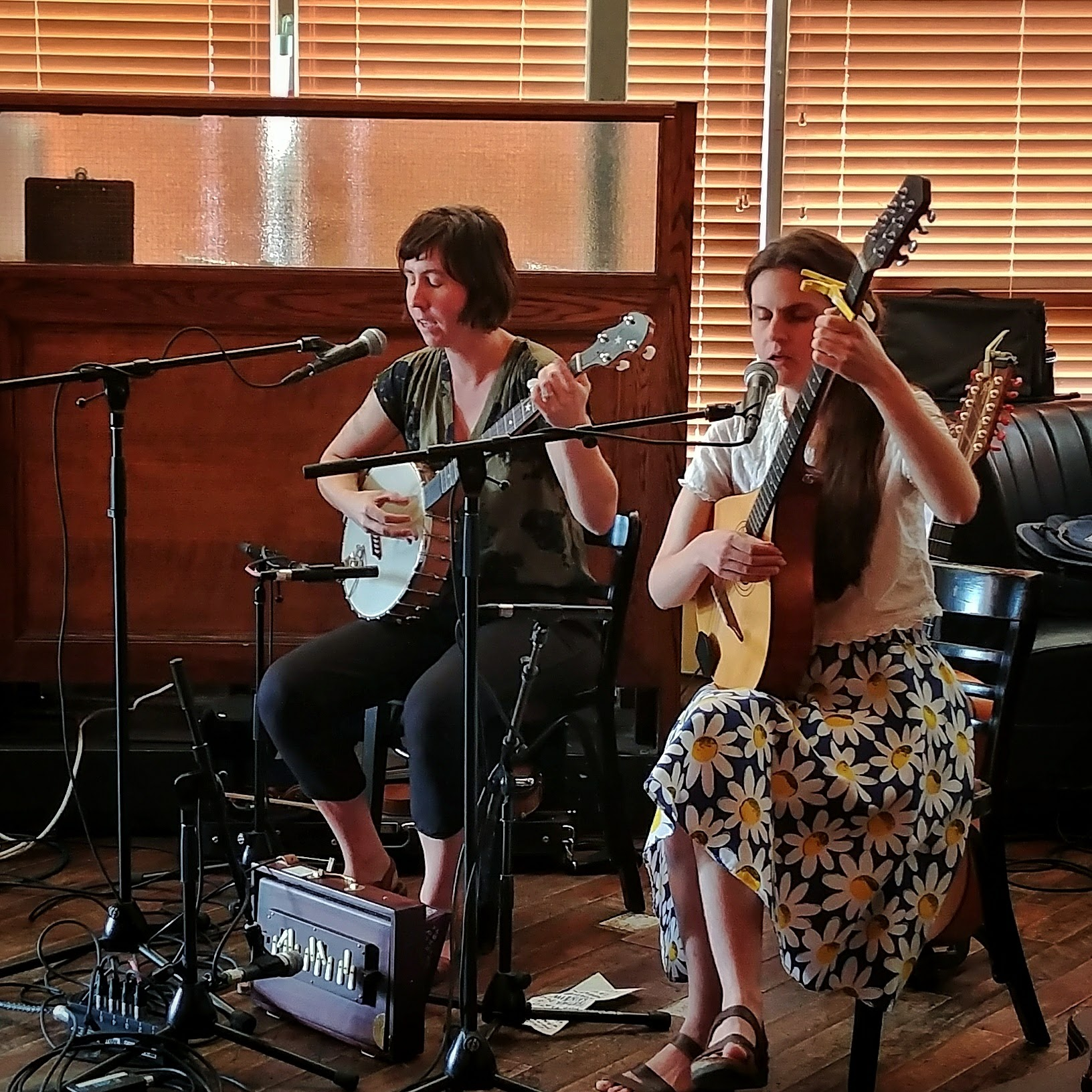
- House and Land perform in July 2017

Background information
- Origin: Asheville, North Carolina
- Genres: Old-time music, Experimental music
- Years active: 2017—
- Labels: Thrill Jockey
- Members: Sally Anne Morgan; Sarah Louise Henson
- Website: House and Land

House and Land is a two-person experimental Appalachian old-time music band based in Asheville, North Carolina. The band members are guitarist and multi-instrumentalist Sarah Louise Henson and fiddler/banjoist Sally Anne Morgan. Both musicians contribute to vocals. They have two albums, the self-titled House and Land, released in June 2017, and Across the Field, released in June 2019. Their first album received a very positive 83 aggregate score on Metacritic and was named the 25th best album of 2017 by Magnet magazine, while their second received an 84 and was named Folk Album of the Month by The Guardian.

The two have toured in the United States and the United Kingdom. They have also appeared at folk festivals such as the annual Pickathon in Portland, Oregon, the Festival for the Eno in Durham, North Carolina, and the Fanø Free Folk Fest in Denmark, playing with artists such as Carole Pegg and Emmanuelle Parrenin.

== History ==
The band members met when Sarah Louise opened as a solo act at the Mothlight in Asheville for another band, the Black Twig Pickers, in which Sally Anne is a vocalist and fiddle player, and after appearing separately at the Big Ears Festival in Knoxville, Tennessee.

Outside of their music careers, Morgan is a letterpress artist with a degree in geology while Henson is also an herbalist.

== Musical style ==
The duo are known for giving a modern, feminist spin to historic and sometimes patriarchal or misogynistic ballads from Great Britain, Appalachia, and the Ozarks region by giving greater voice to the songs' female protagonists. They have also chosen to record other songs with problematic lyrics as instrumentals only. Examples of this include the traditional murder ballad "Two Sisters", as a harmony for guitar and banjo in 2019, and songs "The Cursed Soldier" and "Rainbow 'Mid Life's Willows." Artists whose songs they have reinterpreted include Robert Burns, Dillard Chandler, and Shirley Collins. Shirley and Dolly Collins' 1978 album For as Many as Will is specifically credited as an inspiration for their second album, as was Swedish psychedelic group Pärson Sound.

== Discography ==
- House and Land (2017)
- Across the Field (2019)
