= Angela Desveaux =

Canadian singer-songwriter

- Origin: Montreal, Quebec, Canada
- Genres: pop rock alternative country
- Occupation: singer-songwriter
- Instrument: Vocals
- Years active: 2005 – present
- Labels: Thrill Jockey; Sonic Unyon; Zunior
- Website: http://www.angeladesveaux.com/

Angela Desveaux is a Canadian singer-songwriter, based in Montreal, Quebec, whose style blends a diverse mix of pop, rock and country influences.

== Background ==
Raised on Cape Breton Island, Desveaux later moved to Montreal and began performing as a vocalist with local country and folk bands, and released a self-titled independent album in 2005. She subsequently met Howard Bilerman, a producer and musician associated with Arcade Fire, who helped her to assemble a band and to record her 2006 album Wandering Eyes.

She released her third album, The Mighty Ship, in 2008.

Desveaux's supporting band currently consists of Mike Feuerstack on guitar, Eric Digras on bass and Gilles Castilloux on drums

== Discography ==
- Angela Desveaux (2005)
- Wandering Eyes (2006)
- The Mighty Ship (2008)
