= The National Trust (band) =

American soul band

- Origin: Chicago, Illinois, United States
- Genres: Philadelphia soul, neo soul
- Years active: 1999–present
- Labels: Thrill Jockey
- Members: Neil Rosario; Mark Henning
- Past members: Andy Cunningham; Doug DeMers; Bryan Aldrin; Colin Studybaker
- Website: trustmusics

The National Trust is a Philadelphia soul, neo soul musical project formed in 1999 in Chicago, Illinois.

== History ==
While only officially formed in the late 1990s, The National Trust can trace its history back to 1990 through band leader, composer and guitarist Neil Rosario's previous bands Dolomite and Fifteen Couples.

After the breakup of Fifteen Couples in 1999, Rosario teamed up with Andy Cunningham (ex-Fifteen Couples guitarist), Doug Demers (ex-Dolomite bassist), vocalist/guitarist Mark Henning (ex-Zoom), and Bryan Aldrin. While still working on material the band signed with record label Thrill Jockey, which released their first song "Make It Happen". They then entered Chicago's Clava studios with producer Brian Deck to begin recording their debut album.

In June 2002, after Rosario returned to Chicago from his father's funeral in Las Vegas, he and Deck spent what has been reported as 500 hours in the studio putting the finishing touches to their debut album Dekkagar, which was released on April 9, 2002.

The National Trust's second album Kings and Queens was released on January 24, 2006.

== Discography ==
=== Dekkagar ===
Dekkagar

Studio album by The National Trust
- Released: April 9, 2002
- Genre: Phili soul, neo soul, indie pop
- Length: 51:54
- Label: Thrill Jockey
- Producer: Brian Deck, Neil Rosario

The National Trust chronology
Dekkagar (2002)	Kings and Queens (2006)

Dekkagar
Review scores
Source	Rating
Allmusic	link
Pitchfork Media	(6.9/10) link

The National Trust's debut album Dekkagar was released on April 9, 2002, by Thrill Jockey Records to generally positive reviews.

==== Track listing ====
All tracks are written by Rosario.

No.	Title	Length
1.	"Making Love (In the Natural Light)"	11:07
2.	"Feather Clip"	4:00
3.	"Neverstop"	5:02
4.	"See No Evil"	6:36
5.	"Lachrymosa"	4:15
6.	"So Anna"	4:24
7.	"From Seven to Mars"	5:28
8.	"Mrs. Turner"	4:10
9.	"First Time That"	6:52
Total length:		51:54

=== Kings and Queens ===
Kings and Queens

Studio album by The National Trust
- Released: January 24, 2006
- Genre: Phili soul, neo soul, indie pop
- Length: 53:49
- Label: Thrill Jockey
- Producer: Abel Garibaldi, Neil Rosario, Mark Henning, Van Christie

The National Trust chronology
Dekkagar (2002)	Kings and Queens (2006)

Kings and Queens
Review scores
Source	Rating
Allmusic	link
Dusted Magazine	(mixed) link
Pitchfork Media	(4.4/10) link
Prefix Magazine	link
Scissorkick	(favorable) link
Tiny Mix Tapes	(favorable) link
Yahoo! Music	link

Kings and Queens was The National Trust's second full-length album. It was released on January 24, 2006, by Thrill Jockey Records. While most reviews were favourable, most commented on the over production of the overall sound; Clearly, these boys can't grasp the concept of "say when" from Pitchfork Media. A majority of the tracks lack in everything but production value from Prefix Magazine.

==== Track listing ====
All tracks are written by Henning, Rosario, except where noted.

No.	Title	Length
1.	"Elevators"	4:14
2.	"Secrets"	5:38
3.	"It's Just Cruel"	5:36
4.	"Canday's Away"	5:14
5.	"Stages"	5:17
6.	"We Can't Do Wrong"	6:10
7.	"Jacuzzis" (Henning, Hypnotic, Rosario)	3:49
8.	"Show and Tell"	6:05
9.	"New Sexy Touch"	6:33
10.	"Shapes and Sizes"	5:13
Total length:		53:49

== Television ==
The O.C.

- Episode - "The Undertow"

The Gilmore Girls

- Episode -

Road Rules
