= Golden Void =

American rock band

- Origin: San Francisco, California
- Genres: Psychedelic rock; stoner rock
- Years active: 2010–present
- Labels: Thrill Jockey; Valley King
- Members: Isaiah Mitchell; Aaron Morgan; Justin Pinkerton; Camilla Saufley

Golden Void is a psychedelic rock band from the San Francisco Bay Area. The band consists of guitarist/vocalist Isaiah Mitchell, bassist Aaron Morgan, drummer Justin Pinkerton and keyboardist/vocalist Camilla Saufley-Mitchell. The band's first recording was released on 7-inch in 2011 by Valley King Records with artwork by Alan Forbes. In 2012 Golden Void released their self-titled debut full-length album on Thrill Jockey records. The band's second album 'Berkana' was released on September 18, 2015.

== Discography ==
Albums

- 2012 Golden Void, Thrill Jockey
- 2015 Berkana, Thrill Jockey

7-inch EPs

- 2011 The Curve, Valley King Records
- 2013 Rise to the Out of Reach, Thrill Jockey
- 2013 Converse Rubber Tracks Hot Lunch/Golden Void (split), Converse
