= Les Ondes Silencieuses =

Studio album by Colleen
- Released: 21 May 2007
- Genre: Ambient; classical
- Length: 43:20
- Label: The Leaf Label
- Producer: Cécile Schott, Emiliano Flores

Colleen chronology
Colleen et les Boîtes à Musique (2006)	Les Ondes Silencieuses (2007)	The Weighing of the Heart (2013)

Professional ratings
Review scores
Source	Rating
Pitchfork	6.8/10 link
Stylus Magazine	A− link

Les Ondes Silencieuses (English: The Still Waters) is the third full-length album by French electronica artist Colleen (real name Cécile Schott) released on 21 May 2007. The Japanese release features three bonus live tracks. The name can be interpreted in numerous ways. It can refer to the unusual calmness of still water, sound waves, or the French expression to refer to strange animal behaviour before earthquakes.

== Style ==
The album was made using natural instruments played live, thus keeping with the unsampled style of Schott's last few albums. Her penchant for unusual instrumentation was again evident, with the spinet and viola da gamba making appearances alongside the more familiar classical guitar and clarinet. The use of the viola da gamba was inspired by a 15-year-old Schott viewing Tous les matins du monde, a French film (adapted from a novel of the same name) based on the life of Marin Marais who played the instrument.

The looped aesthetic that had characterised much of Colleen's earlier work was discarded on this release in favour of a more open-ended and unstructured approach.

A marine theme is apparent in the name of many of the tracks and in the name of the album itself.

== Track listing ==
All songs were composed and played by Cécile Schott.

1. "This Place In Time" – 2:33
2. "Le Labyrinthe" – 5:15
3. "Sun Against My Eyes" – 4:22
4. "Les Ondes Silencieuses" – 6:09
5. "Blue Sands" – 5:16
6. "Echoes And Coral" – 3:09
7. "Sea Of Tranquillity" – 5:46
8. "Past The Long Black Land" – 3:41
9. "Le Bateau" – 7:09

=== Bonus Japanese tracks ===
10. "Unfold Out" – 5:36
11. "Serpentine" – 6:04
12. "I'll Read You A Story" – 5:18

"Unfold Out" and "Serpentine" were recorded live in Asahi Art Square, Tokyo.

== Credits ==
=== Instrumentation ===
- Cécile Schott – clarinet (tracks 3, 7), classical guitar (tracks 3, 7), singing bowls (track 6), spinet (track 2) and viola da gamba (tracks 1, 4, 5, 8, 9).

=== Production credits ===
- Composed by Cécile Schott
- Produced by Cécile Schott and Emiliano Flores
- Mixed by Cécile Schott and Emiliano Flores
- Recorded by Cécile Schott (tracks 1, 2, 5, 6, 8) and Emiliano Flores (tracks 3, 4, 5, 7, 9)
- Mastering by Emiliano Flores
- Artwork by Iker Spozio
