= C-Clamp (band) =

American indie rock band

- Origin: Chicago, Illinois, United States
- Genres: Slowcore; post-rock; Midwest emo
- Years active: 1994–1999
- Labels: Ohio Gold; Mud; Divot; Opium; Numero
- Past members: Tom Fitzgerald; Nick Macri; Frantz Etienne
- Website: Ohio Gold site (as of 2002)

C-Clamp was an American indie rock band from Urbana-Champaign, Illinois, active between 1994 and 1999. The band released two full-length albums while they were together.

== History ==
C-Clamp had three members: Tom Fitzgerald (vocals/guitar), Nick Macri (bass/vocals), and Frantz Etienne (drums). Although they performed live infrequently due to issues with finding time to practice and the members living in different places, they managed to share the stage with many noteworthy bands of their time, including Braid, Castor, Dianogah, Karate and Hum.

After the recording of Longer Waves, Etienne left the band. The remaining members tried playing with other drummers before the band broke up by the end of 1999. Macri would go on to perform in the bands Heroic Doses, Euphone, Sunny Day Real Estate, The Lonesome Organist, and The Zincs, as well as with the artists Bobby Conn and Jeremy Enigk. Fitzgerald would later go on to play in The Most Distant Object.

On September 27, 2022, The Numero Group announced that they would be reissuing the band's entire discography, beginning with "In Tow" from Longer Waves and continuing through December 8, 2023 with the release of Dream Backwards, a collection of their two albums and several compilation tracks and b-sides.

== Style ==
The band's style has often referred to as slowcore. They placed emphasis on mood, texture and rhythm, and a sense of space while maintaining a subtle melodic sense vocally. They were known for their dense layering and simple, yet beautiful vocal harmonies. Many songs had simple structures that the band would stretch out and take advantage of to create beautiful soundscapes.

Steve Holmes, member of the band American Football, cited C-Clamp's unique time signature style as an inspiration for their song "I'll See You When We're Both Not So Emotional".

== Discography ==
=== Albums ===
- Meander + Return (1995. Ohio Gold Records)
- Longer Waves (1999, Ohio Gold Records)

=== Singles ===
- "Soft" b/w "Rinse" (1993, Banter Records/Flannel Camel)
- "Passing" (1995, Seek Lamp)
- "Saving Daylight" b/w "Shorty" (1998, Ohio Gold Records)
- "In Tow" (2022, The Numero Group)
- "Land Meets Sea" (2022, The Numero Group)
- "Minnesota" (2022, The Numero Group)
- "Passing" (2023, The Numero Group)
- "Morning" (2023, The Numero Group)
- "A Stand Still" (2023, The Numero Group)
- "In Glory, In Wire" (2023, The Numero Group)
- "Cah" (2023, The Numero Group)
- "Ocean Pacific" (2023, The Numero Group)
- "2000 Miles" (2023, The Numero Group)

=== Compilations ===
- Dream Backwards (2023, The Numero Group)

=== Compilation appearances ===
- "Pacific Ocean" and "Shorty (The Lonely Moog Mix)" on Cover The Earth (1996, Mud Records)
- "Saving Daylight" on Disco Sucks (1996, Ché)
- "Cah" on Ground Rule Double (1996, Divot Records/Actionboy Records)
- "2000 Miles" on The My Pal God Holiday Record (1998, My Pal God Records)
- "In Glory, In Wire" on MyOhioActionPalBoyGoldGod300 (1999, My Pal God Records/ActionBoy 300 Records/Ohio Gold Records)
