= Everyone Alive Wants Answers =

Studio album by Colleen
- Released: June 30, 2003
- Genre: Ambient
- Length: 39:47
- Label: Leaf BAY31

Colleen chronology
Everyone Alive Wants Answers (2003)	The Golden Morning Breaks (2005)

Professional ratings
Review scores
Source	Rating
AllMusic	4/5 stars
Muzik	3/5 stars
Pitchfork Media	(8.4/10)

Everyone Alive Wants Answers is an album by Colleen, released in 2003, re-released in 2016.

== Track listing ==
1. "Everyone Alive Wants Answers" – 3:31
2. "Ritournelle" – 3:09
3. "Carry-Cot" – 1:53
4. "Your Heart on Your Sleeve" – 2:46
5. "Goodbye Sunshine" – 2:48
6. "One Nights and It's Gone" – 3:42
7. "Long Live Mice in the Metro" – 2:50
8. "I Was Deep in a Dream and I Didn't Know It" – 2:56
9. "Babies" – 3:34
10. "Sometimes on a Happy Cloud" – 1:55
11. "A Swimming Pool Down the Railway Track" – 4:14
12. "In the Train With No Lights" – 2:02
13. "Nice and Simple" – 4:20

== Samples ==
"Your Heart on Your Sleeve" contains a sample from the song "Here She Comes Now", by The Velvet Underground.
