= Alexander Tucker (musician) =

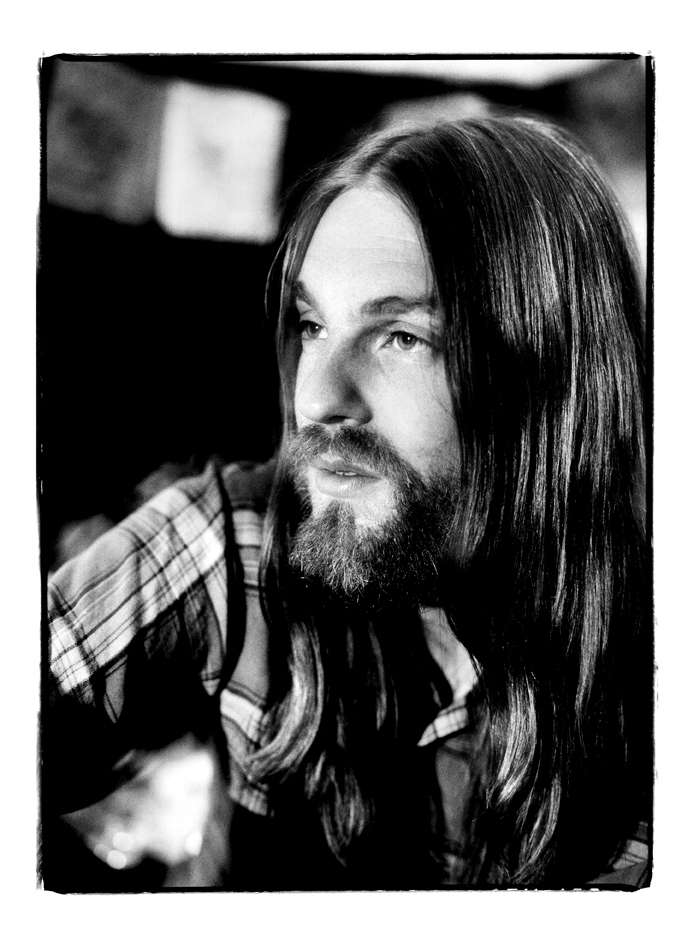

Background information
- Origin: Kent, England
- Genres: Experimental; Blues; Freak Folk post-punk
- Occupations: Musician, songwriter, record producer
- Instruments: Vocals, guitar synthesizer, mandolin, guitar
- Years active: 1990s - present
- Label: ATP Recordings
- Website: MySpace Page

Alexander Tucker is an English musician from Kent who writes, records and performs alone and in collaboration with a varied array of artists. One critic writes that "Tucker sounds like he's following a tradition that has long been neglected, focusing not on ageless songs and ideas but on ageless feelings captured through his droning miasma of acoustic guitar and mandolin." He first appeared as the singer in hardcore band Suction in the early 1990s, who according to Tucker "played noisy adolescent punk with leanings towards Swans and Fugazi." His next job was as vocalist of post-rock hardcore 5-piece Unhome who released one album Short History of Houses (Unlabel) and a split single with Papa M. Unhome split in late 1999 and Tucker went on to tour the UK with Detroit space-rockers Fuxa, playing guitar synthesizers.

== Solo recordings ==
Tucker developed his interest in improvisation using detuned guitars, tape loops, mini disc players and FX pedals. In early 2000, he recorded a solo self-titled album of acoustic finger-picking, experimental electronics, field recordings and vocals, which was picked up by Tom Greenwood of Jackie-O-Motherfucker and released on his U-Sound Archives label. This style was refined in his live performances. One reviewer wrote of a 2008 performance that they had "seen a lot of live looping musicians in recent years and Alexander Tucker is by far one of the best. With cello, mandolin, acoustic guitar, his voice and a bank of pedals, he creates soundscapes which shift through folk, drone metal and electronica." Further years of writing and recording led to a new record deal with ATP Recordings, with whom he released Old Fog in 2005. One reviewer wrote of the LP that "his beautifully spooked wanderings feature both delicately picked banjo and acoustic guitar, violin, piano, detuned electric guitar, found sounds, looped noise and ghostly vocals, all layered to eerily resonant effect. A wintry and wonderful new discovery", whilst another wrote that it was "The kind of fog you won't mind getting lost in... a beautiful listen." Brandon Stosuy of Rhino magazine wrote that "Over its course, Tucker piles inland shanties atop field recordings, piano, jittery bows, noise squalls, and bone creaks. Throughout, his fingerpicking feels almost possessed." Both of his first two albums were recorded on a digital 8-track when Tucker lived in a flat above Warren St. tube station, and the vibrations from passing tube trains can be heard in the background of some tracks.

== Collaborations and Furrowed Brow ==
Rucker went on to work with Stephen O'Malley of Sunn O))) & Khanate on his Ginnungagap side project, and in 2008 as Stephen O'Malley and Alexander Tucker Duo. Other collaborations have included providing the soundtrack to Lali Chetwynd's performance piece at Tate Britain and playing with Duke Garwood and Daniel O'Sullivan and Dave Smith of Guapo under The Stargazers Assistant moniker, and with Jussi Lehtisalo of Circle in Grumbling Fur. In 2008 he recorded and performed the soundtrack for Phil Coy's film Wordland. A second album on ATPR, Furrowed Brow was recorded in Kent and released in November 2006. One reviewer stated "Furrowed Brow is without a doubt Tucker's most accomplished foray into the recorded sphere of everything musical, a great improvement upon his Old Fog collection of 2005", and another noted that it was "a bold statement of a record and Alexander Tucker's finest collection of work so far." Chris Parkin, reviewing for Time Out, noted "this astonishing second album is haunted by John Fahey's mystical guitar style, but Tucker reinterprets and paints over any old influence with a dense and doomy mix of detuned guitars, looped drones and warped harmonies. It's the equivalent of dubstep for folk traditionalists." Tucker is also a visual artist, creating artwork for all of his album covers and side projects, including ongoing drawings and comic artwork for Sturgeon White Moss (White Moss Press) and an album cover for Nordic doom-metal band Wolfmangler.

== "Custom Made" and Portal ==
The start of 2008 saw Tucker out on tour throughout the UK with label-mates Fuck Buttons. In April of that year, Tucker's song "Veins to the Sky" as a double 7" single project entitled "Custom Made", released by ATP Recordings. The song was later included on Tucker's fourth album, Portal. Plan B stated that "his guitar work hints at everything from Led Zeppelin's most stately to My Bloody Valentine's most cryptic, no bad place to be" while Uncut described the album as "a steady grower... a meticulously disorienting, blissed environment... very pleasing." Pitchfork was less positive, describing it as "idea-deficient" and stating that "Enjoyment... lasts about as long as it takes you to read the biography included in its one-sheet" which made comparisons between Tucker and Jim O'Rourke, summarising the album as "work of a neophyte enthusiast with a big record collection and an overly tamed menagerie of effects pedals." Later that year he performed at the ATP New York Festival, and toured Europe as support to Bohren & der Club of Gore.

In April 2011, he released the album Dorwytch, followed in April 2012 by Third Mouth, both on Thrill Jockey.

== Discography ==
=== Albums ===
- Alexander Tucker (U-Sound Archive, 2003)
- Old Fog (ATPR, 2005)
- Furrowed Brow (ATPR, 2006)
- Portal (ATPR, 2008)
- Dorwytch (Thrill Jockey, 2011)
- Third Mouth (Thrill Jockey, 2012)
- Don't Look Away (Thrill Jockey, 2018)
- Guild of the Asbestos Weaver (Thrill Jockey, 2019)
- Fifth Quarter (Subtext, 2023)

== Singles ==
- "Custom Made" (2x7", ATPR, 2008)
