= Town & Country (band) =

American minimalist quartet

- Origin: Chicago, IL, United States
- Years active: 1998–2006
- Labels: Thrill Jockey; Box Media
- Past members: Ben Vida; Joshua Abrams; Liz Payne; Jim Dorling
- Website: Thrill Jockey artist page

Town & Country was an American minimalist quartet based in Chicago.

Members were:

- Ben Vida: guitar/trumpet (also member of Pillow and Terminal 4, currently performing solo as Bird Show and also in the Drag City band Singer)
- Josh Abrams: double bass/piano
- Liz Payne: double bass (also member of Pillow)
- Jim Dorling: harmonium

The four members of Town & Country continue to work together in DRMWPN ("Dreamweapon"), a Chicago-based large improvising drone ensemble with a varying cast of performers.

== Discography ==
=== Albums ===
- Town & Country - 1998 - Box Media
- It All Has to Do with It - 2000 - Thrill Jockey
- C'mon - 2002 - Thrill Jockey
- 5 - 2003 - Thrill Jockey
- Up Above - 2006 - Thrill Jockey

=== EP ===
- Decoration Day - 2000 - Thrill Jockey
