= The Lonesome Organist =

One-man band project of Jeremy Jacobsen

The Lonesome Organist is the one-man band project of Jeremy Jacobsen, keyboardist for Chicago Post-rock combo, 5ive Style. He has released three albums on Chicago indie label Thrill Jockey; a fourth album, Ashes... Alas was self-released in 2015.

== Style ==
According to Allmusic, influences for the project include film composer, Ennio Morricone and Psychobilly legend, Hasil Adkins.

A multi-instrumentalist, Jacobsen, uses guitar, keys, harmonica, steel drum, and various percussion instruments to get his unique blend of blues, rock, garage, Caribbean, and Appalachian sounds.

According to Thrill Jockey's official artist site, no more than 8 tracks are recorded for each song, allowing Jacobsen to preserve the authenticity of his live show in which he simultaneously plays two or more instruments at once.

An updated recording of The Lost Oar (first recorded on 1997's Collector of Cactus Echo Bags) can be found on 5ive Style's second full-length Miniature Portraits.

For Forms and Follies, Jacobsen added bassist Nick Macri, of Bobby Conn, C-Clamp and Euphone, for two tracks.

== Performances and collaboration ==
The Lonesome Organist has performed throughout the United States, Canada, Europe and Japan. He performed at the 2002 Meltdown Festival, curated by David Bowie, at Royal Festival Hall in London and at the 2002 ATP Festival, curated by Shellac.

Jeremy Jacobsen has recorded with 5ive Style, Euphone, Jon Spencer Blues Explosion, Via Tania, Red Red Meat, Man or Astro-man? and Barbez, and has composed music for Redmoon Theater as well as the Chicago Complaints Choir.

== Discography ==
- Collector of Cactus Echo Bags, Thrill Jockey, 1997
- Cavalcade, Thrill Jockey, 1999
- Forms and Follies, Thrill Jockey, June 3, 2003
- Ashes... Alas, self-released, Oct. 31, 2015
