= High Places =

American band

- Performing at the Pitchfork Music Festival, July 2008

Background information
- Origin: Brooklyn, New York
- Years active: 2006–present
- Labels: Thrill Jockey, Upset The Rhythm, Mistletone
- Members: Rob Barber; Mary Pearson
- Website: https://hellohighplaces.blogspot.com/, http://www.myspace.com/hellohighplaces

High Places is a band originating from Brooklyn, New York, that subsequently relocated to Los Angeles, California. The band is a duo comprising multi-instrumentalist Rob Barber and vocalist Mary Pearson.

Pearson and Barber met while Mary was completing a music degree in bassoon performance at Western Michigan University and Rob was working in visual art, teaching lithography and etching in New York. Both were performing as solo musicians at the time, Mary as Transformation Surprise, and Rob as the Urxed. The two began collaborating under the name High Places in May 2006, after Mary relocated to New York.

High Places, has performed at the Solomon R. Guggenheim Museum, Whitney Museum of American Art the New Museum and The Kitchen in New York City. They have performed at the Smithsonian Institution's Hirshhorn Museum and Sculpture Garden as part of Doug Aitken's SONG 1 (2012) in Washington DC. In Berlin, they have performed via Volksbühne and Berghain's main room. With Lucky Dragons they have performed collaboratively in the group's 2008 Whitney Biennial performance, as well as at the Museum of Contemporary Art, Los Angeles, and REDCAT. Rob has played drums in the Boredoms' 88 Boadrum Los Angeles LACMA performance, and performed as part of the Doug Aitken-curated Museum of Contemporary Art, Los Angeles 2010 benefit.

High Places have toured with Toro Y Moi, Deerhunter, Liars, No Age, Lucky Dragons, Yacht, Dan Deacon and Xiu Xiu

High Places’ self-titled debut was recorded by Rob and Mary in their apartment in Brooklyn’s Bedford–Stuyvesant neighborhood between January and May 2008.

== Discography ==
=== Albums ===
- 03/07–09/07 (Compilation) on Thrill Jockey (2008)
- High Places on Thrill Jockey (2008)
- High Places vs. Mankind (March 23, 2010)
- Original Colors on Thrill Jockey (2011)

=== 7" EPs ===
- High Places (2007)
- Picture Disc (2007)
- Vision's the First... b/w Namer (2008)
- Can't Feel Born 12-inch(2010)

=== Splits ===
- with Aa Wedding 7-inch (2007)
- with Xiu Xiu Polaroid 7-inch (2008)
- with Soft Circle 12-inch on PPM Records (2009)

=== Compilations ===
- Grown Zone on States Rights Records (2007)
- Mistletonia on Mistletone Records (2007)
- Love And Circuits on Cardboard Records (2008)

=== Other ===
- 6 song demo CD-R (2006)
- Can't Feel Born 12-inch (2010)
