= Pit er Pat =

American post-rock band

Pit Er Pat
- Origin: Chicago, Illinois, United States
- Genres: Post-rock
- Years active: 2002-present
- Labels: BAROS, Overcoat, Mythologies, Thrill Jockey, Headz
- Members: Fay Davis-Jeffers, Butchy Fuego, Rob Doran
- Website: www.piterpat.com

Pit Er Pat is a post-rock band from Chicago Illinois. They formed in 2002 as the trio of Fay Davis-Jeffers on keyboard and vocals, former founding member of Alkaline Trio Rob Doran on bass, and Butchy Fuego on drums. Their sound is very atmospheric and has a dark ambience that is similar to other instrumental avant-garde groups. Much of the group's offerings are rhythmically complex as well.

The group released nine records between 2004–2008, touring extensively throughout the United States, Europe, and Mexico. After the album "High Time" was released in October 2008, Doran left the group for other pursuits. In the spring of 2009, Fuego and Davis-Jeffers toured as a duo for the first time, performing all new music. The tour included a performance at All Tomorrow's Parties festival in Minehead, England.

In 2004, Pit Er Pat performed on the second volume of the Burn to Shine DVD series. On July 7, 2007, Butchy Fuego participated in the Yamantaka Eye (Boredoms) lead drum collaboration/concert 77 Boadrum at Empire-Fulton Ferry State Park in Brooklyn, New York.

On their 2007 Covers EP, Pit Er Pat had guest instrumentalist add some woodwind and brass to their sound. Billy Blaze played flute and tenor saxophone, and Nick Broste (Mucca Pazza) played trombone.

== Discography ==
Pit Er Pat has released music in the United States under the Thrill Jockey, Overcoat Recordings, Mythologies and BAROS records, and in Japan through the Headz label.

- The Babies Are Tired/Lullaby (12-inch) - Baros - 2004
- Emergency EP (CD) - Overcoat Recordings - 2004
- "Emergency" (LP) - Mythologies - 2004
- "Big Pants/Jump Off" (split 7-inch w/ Icy Demons) - Polyvinyl Record Co. - 2004
- Shakey (CD/LP) - Thrill Jockey - 2005
- 3D Message EP (CD) - Thrill Jockey - 2006
- Pyramids (CD/LP) - Thrill Jockey - 2006
- "Feel No Pain" (CD) - Self-Released - 2007
- Covers EP - Thrill Jockey - 2007
- High Time (CD/LP) - Thrill Jockey - 2008
- "High Time Remix" (12-inch) - Thrill Jockey - 2009
- The Flexible Entertainer (CD/LP) - Thrill Jockey - 2010
