= Pontiak =

American neo-psychedelic rock band

- Origin: Blue Ridge Mountain, Virginia, USA
- Genres: Indie, Hard rock, stoner rock, neo-psychedelia
- Years active: 2004–present
- Labels: Thrill Jockey
- Members: Jennings Carney; Van Carney; Lain Carney
- Website: official website

Pontiak is an American neo-psychedelic rock band of three brothers from the Blue Ridge Mountain area of Virginia: Jennings Carney (bass, organ, vocals—born 1978, Washington DC), Van Carney (lead vocals, guitar—born 1980, Washington DC) and Lain Carney (drums, vocals—born 1982, Washington DC). The band officially formed in January 2004.

== Biography ==
They were part of the Baltimore music scene for four or five years and then moved back to Virginia. Van, Lain, and Jennings Carney initially connected to Baltimore's growing scene as they got their start there. They are still associated with Baltimore bands, including Arbouretum with whom they shared a split release EP

Lain and Van both spent some time in college studying in London and now the band regularly tours in Europe.

The band signed with Thrill Jockey in 2008. On February 6, 2012 they released their ninth album, Echo Ono, their seventh on Thrill Jockey.

On January 28, 2014 they released their tenth album, Innocence (also on Thrill Jockey).

Maker is Pontiak's third album, originally released in 2009.

Living is Pontiak's fourth album, originally released in 2010.

Dialectic of Ignorance is Pontiak's last album, released in 2017.

== Genre ==
Their music is not easily classified. They have been compared to Harvey Milk, Black Sabbath, and Neil Young. Also, My Morning Jacket, Sleep, Slint, Midlake, Crazy Horse, Mudhoney, and others. And: neo-psychedelic rock, '60s psych and acid rock, '70s progressive and proto-metal, and '90s stoner rock and indie rock.

== Discography ==
- White Buffalo EP (2005); Fireproof Records
- Valley of Cats (2006); Fireproof Records
- Sun on Sun (2007); Fireproof Records; (2008) re-release Thrill Jockey
- Kale EP (2008 with Arbouretum); Thrill Jockey
- Maker (2009); Thrill Jockey
- Sea Voids (2009); Thrill Jockey
- Living (2010); Thrill Jockey
- Comecrudos EP (2011); Thrill Jockey
- Echo Ono (2012); Thrill Jockey
- Innocence (2014)
- Revolve 7 EP (2014); Revolve
- Dialectic of Ignorance (2017); Thrill Jockey

== Film ==
- Heat Leisure (2013)
