= Rhyton (band) =

American psychedelic rock band

Rhyton is an American experimental psychedelic rock band from Brooklyn, New York.

== History ==
Rhyton was formed as an improvisational outfit by Dave Shuford, Jimy Seitang, and Spencer Herbst; Shuford had been a member of No Neck Blues Band and Seitang had played with Psychic Ills. The group recorded its debut album in a span of only three days, later issuing it as a self-titled effort on the label Thrill Jockey. Drummer Rob Smith, who was also a member of Pigeons, began touring with the band across the US and Europe, and subsequently replaced Herbst when he left. Rhyton began incorporating more Greek and Southern-American song forms with their improvisations, and has since released two further full-lengths on Thrill Jockey as well as two limited-edition LPs on other labels.

== Discography ==
- Rhyton (Thrill Jockey, 2011)
- The Emerald Tablet (Three Lobed Recordings, 2012)
- Kykeon (Thrill Jockey, 2014)
- Navigating by Starlight (MIE Music, 2015)
- Redshift (Thrill Jockey, 2016)
