= The Golden Morning Breaks =

Studio album by Colleen
- Released: May 23, 2005
- Genre: Ambient
- Length: 49:05
- Label: The Leaf Label BAY48

Colleen chronology
Everyone Alive Wants Answers (2003)	The Golden Morning Breaks (2005)	Mort Aux Vaches (2006)

Professional ratings
Review scores
Source	Rating
Allmusic	4.5/5 stars
Pitchfork Media	(8.0/10)

The Golden Morning Breaks is an album by Colleen, released in 2005. It takes on a more natural and less synthetic sound than its predecessor, 2003's Everyone Alive Wants Answers, which was almost entirely sampled. The cover art is by Iker Spozio.

A video was made by Jon Nordstrom for the song "I'll Read You a Story".

== Track listing ==
1. "Summer Water" – 3:39
2. "Floating in the Clearest Night" – 2:36
3. "The Heart Harmonicon" – 3:53
4. "Sweet Rolling" – 4:04
5. "The Happy Sea" – 3:00
6. "I'll Read You a Story" – 6:51
7. "Bubbles Which on the Water Swim" – 3:11
8. "Mining in the Rain" – 3:11
9. "The Golden Morning Breaks" – 5:22
10. "Everything Lay Still" – 13:18
