= Thrill Jockey =

American independent record label

- Founded: 1992
- Founder: Bettina Richards
- Genre: Indie rock; post-rock; experimental rock; electronica
- Country of origin: United States
- Location: Chicago, Illinois
- Official website: thrilljockey.com

Thrill Jockey is an American independent record label established by former Atlantic Records A&R representative Bettina Richards and based in Chicago.

== History ==
Richards started the label in 1992 with $35,000 of family and personal capital, while working at a Hoboken, New Jersey, record store, and ran the label from her apartment in New York City. In 1995, she moved the label to Chicago, where "rent and taxes are considerably cheaper" according to Richards, and the independent label then found larger success.

Thrill Jockey offers full-length streaming of every song on every release in its catalog. "I believe if people can listen to the albums, they tend to buy them," Richards said in a 2006 interview with Chicago Reader.

Acts who have released music on the label have been associated with post-rock, including Tortoise, The Sea and Cake, Trans Am and Califone, as well as German electronica acts like Mouse on Mars and Oval. In addition, Thrill Jockey's roster has variously featured Double Dagger, Future Islands, Bummer, High Places, ADULT., Bosse-de-Nage, David Byrne, Nobukazu Takemura, Bobby Conn, Tom Verlaine, Freakwater, The Zincs, The National Trust, Eleventh Dream Day, Chicago Underground Duo, Howe Gelb/Giant Sand, Mary Lattimore, Town & Country, Archer Prewitt, The Lonesome Organist, OOIOO, Pit er Pat, Marisa Anderson, The Fiery Furnaces, Angela Desveaux, Liturgy, Boredoms, Pontiak, and Golden Void amongst others. Artists on the label have often collaborated with other artists on the label to form spin-off groups.

=== Fifteenth birthday ===
In 2007, bands from Thrill Jockey's roster recorded songs for a box set to celebrate the label's 15th birthday. Bands were asked to choose a song to cover by any other act on their roster. Plum 7" Box Set compilation was released in December 2007 on ten 7-inch vinyl singles. Directions covered Tortoise guitarist Jeff Parker's "Toy Boat", while Pullman covered the Chicago Underground Quartet's "3 A.M." Bobby Conn, Califone and Thalia Zedek all covered Freakwater songs, while The Sea and Cake reworked a version of Califone's "Spider's House". Tortoise covered Japanese artist Nobukazu Takemura's "Falls Lake", and David Byrne contributed a cover of the Fiery Furnaces' "Ex-Guru".

== See also ==
- List of record labels
- Thrill Jockey discography
