= Heba Kadry =

Egyptian mastering engineer

- Genres: Indie rock, noise rock, alternative rock, psychedelic rock, shoegazing, dream pop
- Occupation: Mastering engineer
- Website: www.hebakadry.com

Heba Kadry is an Egyptian-American mastering engineer who currently resides in Brooklyn, New York. She is best known for her work with Björk, Beach House, Slowdive, The Mars Volta, Neon Indian, Wooden Shjips, Lightning Bolt, White Hills, Alex G, Future Islands, Liturgy, !!!, White Lung, ...And You Will Know Us by the Trail of Dead, boygenius, Nation of Language and The Hotelier. Kadry worked as a staff engineer at SugarHill Recording Studios from 2005 to 2006.

== Selected discography ==
Year	Artist	Title
2026	Cameron Winter	Live at Carnegie Hall
2026	Pond	Terrestrials
2026	Underscores	U (on the song "Music")
2026	Gorillaz	The Mountain
2026	Dry Cleaning	Secret Love
2026	Feeble Little Horse	Bitknot
2026	Mandy, Indiana	URGH
2025	Jane Remover	Heart
2025	Garbage	Let All That We Imagine Be the Light
2025	Upchuck	I'm Nice Now
2025	Ryan Davis & the Roadhouse Band	New Threats from the Soul
2024	Garbage	Copy/Paste
2024	John Cale	Paris 1919 (reissue)
2024	John Cale	The Academy in Peril (reissue)
2024	J. Mamana	For Every Set of Eyes
2024	Mk.gee	Two Star & the Dream Police
2024	Body Meat	Starchris
2023	Emma Anderson	Pearlies
2023	Underscores	Wallsocket
2023	Animal Collective	Isn't It Now?
2023	Feeble Little Horse	Girl with Fish
2023	Carlos Dengler	Private Earth
2023	Greg Mendez	Greg Mendez
2022	Garbage	Anthology
2022	Wu-Lu	Loggerhead
2022	Big Thief	Dragon New Warm Mountain I Believe in You
2022	Animal Collective	Time Skiffs
2021	Roosevelt	See You Again
2021	Garbage	No Gods No Masters
2021	Hayley Williams	Flowers for Vases / Descansos
2021	Puma Blue	In Praise of Shadows
2020	The Soft Pink Truth	Shall We Go on Sinning So That Grace May Increase?
2020	Nicolas Jaar	Telas
2020	Jack Garratt	Love, Death & Dancing
2020	Julianna Barwick	Healing Is a Miracle
2020	Black Lips	Sing In A World That's Falling Apart
2020	Dan Deacon	Mystic Familiar
2020	Thao & The Get Down Stay Down	Temple
2019	Long Beard	Means to Me
2019	Ryuichi Sakamoto	Proxima Original Soundtrack
2019	Ryuichi Sakamoto	B2-Unit (Remaster)
2019	Ryuichi Sakamoto	BTTB 20th Anniversary Edition
2019	Lightning Bolt	Sonic Citadel
2019	Blanck Mass	Animated Violence Mild
2019	Girlpool	What Chaos Is Imaginary
2019	Shura	forevher
2019	Jenny Hval	The Practice of Love
2019	Jay Som	Anak Ko
2019	Cate Le Bon	Reward
2019	Methyl Ethel	Triage
2019	Bobby Krlic	Midsommar Original Soundtrack
2019	Lingua Ignota	Caligula
2019	Battles	Juice B Crypts
2019	SQÜRL	The Dead Don't Die Original Soundtrack
2019	Explosions In The Sky	The Rescue - 20th Anniversary Edition
2019	Explosions In The Sky	How Strange, Innocence - 20th Anniversary Edition
2019	Deerhunter	Why Hasn't Everything Already Disappeared?
2019	Mdou Moctar	Ilana (The Creator)
2019	Chelsea Wolfe	Birth Of Violence
2019	Holly Herndon	Proto
2019	Mark Korven	The Lighthouse Original Soundtrack
2019	Ioanna Gika	Thalassa
2019	Cass McCombs	Tip of the Sphere
2019	Silversun Pickups	Widow's Weeds
2019	Lower Dens	The Competition
2019	Alex G	House of Sugar
2019	Holy Ghost!	Work
2018	boygenius	Boygenius
2018	J. Mamana	Nothing New in the West
2018	The Sea and Cake	Any Day
2018	Lucy Dacus	Historian
2018	serpentwithfeet	Soil
2018	Daughters	You Won't Get What You Want
2018	Gang Gang Dance	Kazuashita
2018	Suzanne Ciani	Live Buchla at Machines in Music
2018	Steve Hauschildt	Dissolvi
2018	Marissa Nadler	For My Crimes
2018	John Maus	Addendum
2018	Ryuichi Sakamoto	Ff2
2018	Bombino	Deran
2017	Björk	Utopia
2017	Alex G	Rocket
2017	Beach House	B-Sides and Rarities
2017	Slowdive	Slowdive
2017	Blanck Mass	World Eater
2017	John Maus	Screen Memories
2017	Diamanda Galás	At Saint Thomas the Apostle Harlem
2017	Black Lips	Satan's Graffiti or God's Art?
2017	Girlpool	Powerplant
2017	Zola Jesus	Okovi
2017	Japanese Breakfast	Soft Sounds from Another Planet
2017	Emel Mathlouthi	Ensen
2017	Austra	Future Politics
2016	Mica Levi	Jackie Original Soundtrack
2016	Leyla McCalla	A Day for the Hunter, a Day for the Prey
2016	Bombino	Azel
2016	Katie Gately	Color
2016	Essaie pas	Demain Est une Autre Nuit
2016	Debo Band	Ere Gobez
2016	DIANA	Familiar Touch
2016	The Hotelier	Goodness
2016	Fudge	Lady Parts
2016	Daddy	Let Me Get What I Want
2016	Wrekmeister Harmonies	Light Falls
2016	Sam Evian	Premium
2016	Slim Cessna's Auto Club	The Commandments According to SCAC
2016	Oozing Wound	Whatever Forever
2015	Alex G	Beach Music
2015	!!!	As If
2015	Neon Indian	Vega Intl. Night School
2015	Grooms	Comb the Feelings Through Your Hair
2015	Rabit	Communion
2015	Tamaryn	Cranekiss
2015	Patrick Higgins	Bachanalia
2015	Indian Handcrafts	Creeps
2015	Suicideyear	Dream 727: Japan + Remembrance
2015	Lightning Bolt	Fantasy Empire
2015	Eternal Summers	Gold and Stone
2015	Larry Gus	I Need New Eyes
2015	No Joy	More Faithful
2015	Princess Century	Progress
2015	Prefuse 73	Rivington Não Rio
2015	Marriages	Salome
2015	Sick Feeling	Suburban Myth
2015	Beach House	Thank Your Lucky Stars
2015	White Hills	Walks for Motorists
2015	Zs	XE
2014	The Hidden Cameras	AGE
2014	Magic Man	Before the Waves
2014	Black Pus / Oozing Wound	Black Pus / Oozing Wound
2014	The Skull Defekts	Dances in Dreams of the Known Unknown
2014	White Lung	Deep Fantasy
2014	Oozing Wound	Earth Suck
2014	Wunder Wunder	Everything Infinite
2014	Nothing	Guilty of Everything
2014	Pontiak	Innocence
2014	Olga Bell	Krai
2014	Rhyton	Kykeon
2014	The Caribbean	Moon Sickness
2014	Beach Day	Native Echoes
2014	Black Static Line	Enil
2014	Xeno & Oaklander	Par Avion
2014	People Get Ready	Physiques
2014	Frontier Ruckus	Sitcom Afterlife
2014	Thalia Zedek	Six
2014	Guardian Alien	Spiritual Emergency
2014	Evian Christ	Waterfall
2014	Regal Degal	Pyramid Bricks
2014	White Hills	So You Are... So You'll Be
2014	Diamond Terrifier	The Subtle Body Wears a Shadow
2013	Sidi Touré	Alafia
2013	Black Pus	All My Relations
2013	Ski Lodge	Big Heart
2013	The Body	Christs, Redeemers
2013	Plankton Wat	Drifter's Temple
2013	Zs	Grain
2013	Cy Dune	No Recognize
2013	Patrick Higgins	String Quartet No. 2; Glacia
2013	Oozing Wound	Retrash
2013	Survival	Survival
2013	Zomes	Time Was
2013	Beach Day	Trip Trap Attack
2013	Jamaican Queens	Wormfood
2012	Eternal Tapestry	A World Out of Time
2012	Moon Duo	Circles
2012	Indian Handcrafts	Civil Disobedience for Losers
2012	Colin L. Orchestra	Col
2012	K-Holes	Dismania
2012	Pontiak	Echo Ono
2012	White Hills	Frying on This Rock
2012	...And You Will Know Us by the Trail of Dead	Lost Songs
2012	The Mars Volta	Noctourniquet
2012	Callers	Reviver
2012	The Sea and Cake	Runner
2012	Guardian Alien	See the Wold Given to a One Love Entity
2012	Plankton Wat	Spirits
2012	Lotus Plaza	Spooky Action at a Distance
2012	TR/ST	TRUST
2011	Liturgy	Aesthethica
2011	Eternal Tapestry	Beyond the 4th Door
2011	Zechs Marquise	Getting Paid
2011	Thank You	Golden Worry
2011	White Hills	H-P1
2011	Colin L. Orchestra	Infinite Ease/Good God
2011	Eternal Tapestry / Sun Araw	Night Gallery
2011	Xray Eyeballs	Not Nothing
2011	The Skull Defekts	Peer Amid
2011	Weekend	Red
2011	Wooden Shjips	West
2010	Future Islands	In Evening Air
2007	White Hills	Glitter Glamour Atrocity
