= KRAI =

KRAI may refer to:

- KRAI (AM), a radio station (550 AM) licensed to Craig, Colorado, United States
- KRAI-FM, a radio station (93.7 FM) licensed to Craig, Colorado, United States
- Krai, a term used to refer to eight of Russia's 84 federal subjects, often translated as territory, province, or region
- Krai (album), a 2014 album by Russian-born New York singer-songwriter Olga Bell
