= Upchuck =

Upchuck may refer to:

- Vomiting
- Upchuck (band), an American punk rock band
- Upchuck (Ben 10), a character in the animated series Ben 10
- Charles "Upchuck" Ruttheimer, III, a character in the animated series Daria
