= Beyond the 4th Door =

Studio album by Eternal Tapestry
- Released: March 15, 2011
- Recorded: 2010
- Studio: Tapestry Space, Portland, Oregon, US; The Loft Recordings, Portland, Oregon, US ("Time Winds Through a Glass, Clearly")
- Genre: Acid rock; space rock
- Length: 43:22
- Label: Thrill Jockey

Eternal Tapestry chronology
The Net: The Unabomber, LSD, and the Internet (2010)	Beyond the 4th Door (2011)	Night Gallery (2011)

Beyond the 4th Door is a 2011 studio album by American psychedelic rock and space rock band Eternal Tapestry. It has received positive reviews from critics.

== Reception ==
Editors at AnyDecentMusic? rated this release 6.8 out of 10, aggregating 7 critic scores. According to the review aggregator Metacritic, Beyond the 4th Door received "generally favorable reviews" based on a weighted average score of 75 out of 100 from 6 critic scores.

Editors at AllMusic rated this album 3.5 out of 5 stars, with critic Thom Jurek writing that much of this release "is unhurried, sonic meandering with a single pointed focus: to alter the listener's consciousness", drawing on Krautrock, Popol Vuh, Ash Ra Tempel, Cluster, and Neu!, featuring the band "at their most focused". Robert Ferguson of Drowned in Sound scored this release an 8 out of 10, stating that "this record couldn't actually be any more psychedelic if it had a picture of a stoned wizard on the front cover", made of "a kind of darkly ambient series of guitar riffs, the weight of which is quite incredible for a selection of songs which never really seek to propel themselves towards a peak, or use quiet/loud-style tension building devices". Beyond the 4th Door garnered 4 out of 5 stars in Mojo, where it was called "a further refinement of their liquid improv vibe [that] finds the quintet sitting on a mountain looking at the sun, high on Popol Vuh and who knows what else". Editors at Pitchfork scored this release 7.3 out of 10 and critic Grayson Haver Currin praised the band for finding new cohesion with an expanded line-up after their several independent releases, resulting in a release that "moves in well-designed waves, never exhausting all its intrigue and energy at any given time". Peter Watts of Uncut gave this album 4 out of 5 stars, characterizing it as "fine brooding spacerock", noting the courage of building up the songs so deliberately "with baby steps, notes tested for strength then played long, low and loud".

== Track listing ==
1. "Ancient Echoes" – 8:07
2. "Cosmic Manhunt" – 4:59
3. "Galactic Derelict" – 7:35
4. "Reflections in a Mirage" – 10:18
5. "Time Winds Through a Glass, Clearly" – 12:22

Bonus track on some editions

6. "Wave Without a Shore" – 10:29

== Personnel ==
Eternal Tapestry

- Jed Bindeman – drums
- Nick Bindeman – guitar, vocals
- Ryan Carlile – saxophone, synthesizer
- Yoni Kifle – bass guitar on "Time Winds Through a Glass, Clearly"
- Krag Likins – bass guitar
- Dewey Mahood – guitar

Additional personnel

- Rebecca Carlisle-Healy – design
- Heba Kadry – audio mastering at The Lodge, New York City, New York, United States
- Abraham Ray – recording on "Time Winds Through a Glass, Clearly"

== See also ==
- 2011 in American music
- 2011 in rock music
- List of 2011 albums
