= Hayday (album) =

Studio album by Feeble Little Horse
- Released: October 22, 2021
- Recorded: 2021
- Studio: Jake Kelley and Ryan Walchonski's apartment, South Oakland, Pittsburgh, Pennsylvania, United States
- Genre: Indie rock
- Length: 20:57
- Language: English
- Label: Julia's War
- Producer: Seb Kinsler

Feeble Little Horse chronology
| Modern Tourism (2021) | Hayday (2021) | Girl with Fish (2023) |

Hayday is a 2021 studio album by American indie rock band Feeble Little Horse, their first full-length album and their first with vocalist Lydia Slocum. The album was recorded as Slocum joined and received positive attention from critics, especially for the track "Chores", leading to the group signing with Saddle Creek Records, which would re-release Hayday in 2022.

== Reception ==
Pitchfork rated Hayday 7.4 out of 10, with Abby Jones calling it "a relentless, intentionally chaotic document of twentysomething existential dread", praising vocalist Lydia Slocum's lyrics in particular. Writing for Stereogum, Eli Enis considers this release "an enormous leap forward" in the band's sound from their debut EP Modern Tourism. In a feature on the band for Paste Devon Chodzin wrote that this album has "screeching earworms made the band unforgettable". "Chores" was highlighted by The New York Times, where critic Lindsay Zoladz writing that the band knows "exactly how much noise belongs in their noise-pop" and calls Slocum's vocals charismatic. Marissa Lorusso of NPR stated that this song "radiates a deliciously over-it energy" with lyrics about a break-up that Slocum went through.

== Track listing ==
All songs written by Jake Kelley, Seb Kinsler, Lydia Slocum, and Ryan Walchonski.

1. "Worth It (Intro)" – 1:14
2. "Termites" – 2:39
3. "Chores" – 2:23
4. "Tricks" – 2:58
5. "Too Much" – 0:44
6. "Sherman's Last Ride" – 0:17
7. "Picture" – 2:05
8. "You Got It Babe" – 0:50
9. "Kennedy" – 2:23
10. "Drama Queen" – 2:29
11. "Grace (Outro)" – 3:04

Bonus tracks on 2022 Saddle Creek re-release

12. "Dog Song 2" – 2:11
13. "Termites" (Full Body 2 Remix) – 3:07

== Personnel ==
Feeble Little Horse

- Jake Kelley – drums, artwork, recording, mixing
- Seb Kinsler – guitar, vocals, recording, mixing, production
- Lydia Slocum – vocals, artwork, recording, mixing
- Ryan Walchonski – guitar, vocals, recording, mixing

Additional personnel

- Benito Countouris – drum recording
- Full Body 2 – remixing
- Dylan Wall – mastering

== See also ==
- List of 2021 albums
