= See the World Given to a One Love Entity =

Studio album by Guardian Alien
- Released: July 24, 2012
- Recorded: March 2012 at Shea Stadium (Brooklyn, New York); May 2012 at Lone Pine Road
- Length: 37:24 (Standard); 44:23 (iTunes)
- Label: Thrill Jockey

Guardian Alien chronology
Guardian Alien (2011)	See the World Given to a One Love Entity (2012)

See the World Given to a One Love Entity is the second album from Brooklyn, New York psychedelic rock band Guardian Alien. The album was released in the form of one 37-minute track.

== Album cover ==
The cover art was done by Turner Williams Jr., who plays shahi baaja on the record. It is said to depict a dream that drummer Greg Fox had. Portions of the cover are reflected in a poem included in the albums packaging, in which he hands a copy of the album to God and finds out he is an alien.

== Track listing ==
No.	Title	Length
1.	"See the World Given to a One Love Entity"	37:24

iTunes Bonus Track
No.	Title	Length
2.	"Birth Throes"	6:59
Total length:		44:23

== Critical reception ==
Professional ratings
Review scores
Source	Rating
AllMusic	4/5 stars
Pitchfork Media	(7.2/10)
Spin	6/10 stars

Upon its release, the album received generally positive reviews.

== Personnel ==
- Guardian Alien
  - Greg Fox – Drums, Gong, Kargyraa, Arrangement, Field recordings, Editing
  - Alex Drewchin Jr. – Vocals
  - Turner Williams Jr. – Shahi baaja, Cover art
  - Bernard Gann – Guitar
  - Eli Winograd – Bass guitar, Recording
- Heba Kadry – Mastering
- Max Hodes – Recording
