= I'm Nice Now =

Studio album by Upchuck
- Released: October 3, 2025
- Studio: Sonic Ranch
- Genre: Punk
- Length: 29:53
- Label: Domino
- Producer: Ty Segall

Upchuck chronology
Bite the Hand That Feeds (2023)	I'm Nice Now (2025)

Singles from I'm Nice Now
- 1. "Forgotten Token" Released: July 16, 2025; 2. "Un Momento" Released: July 16, 2025

I'm Nice Now is the third studio album by American punk rock band Upchuck. It was released on October 3, 2025, via Domino Recording Company in LP, CD and digital formats.

== Background ==
Produced and mixed at Sonic Ranch by multi-instrumentalist Ty Segall, the album was released two years after the band's second full-length LP, Bite the Hand That Feeds.

On July 16, 2025, the band released the singles "Forgotten Token" and "Un Momento". Lead vocalist Kaila Thompson commented on the first single, "You can lose things easily and not care, thinking you'll just get another one. But people aren't objects," referring to her sister's death during the recording of the album.

== Reception ==
Professional ratings
Review scores
Source	Rating
AllMusic	4.5/5 stars
Kerrang	4/5
Louder Than War	4.5/5 stars

The album received a 4.5-star rating from and was recognized as "Album of the Week" by Louder Than War, whose reviewer Nathan Whittle noted it as "an album of real depth," stating "It should, and does, speak to anyone who is tired of feeling like pawns lined up for societal sacrifice."

In a review for 4.5-star review for AllMusic, Tim Sendra remarked, "While the record is stuffed with paint-peeling rockers like 'Plastic' and 'Kin,' where vocalist KT battles the rampaging band to a bloody draw, there are songs that show the group stretching in interesting ways."

James Hingle of Kerrang! stated that it "isn't just an album, it's a survival tactic, a soundtrack to resistance in a country still burning," giving it a rating of four.

== Track listing ==
All tracks are written by Upchuck.

I'm Nice Now track listing
No.	Title	Length
1.	"Tired"	2:11
2.	"Plastic"	1:55
3.	"New Case"	2:46
4.	"Fried"	1:29
5.	"Homenaje"	2:57
6.	"Kept Inside"	2:52
7.	"Pressure"	2:11
8.	"Un Momento"	2:06
9.	"Forgotten Token"	3:28
10.	"Kin"	1:40
11.	"Lost One"	1:52
12.	"Slow Down"	1:58
13.	"Nowhere"	2:28
Total length:		29:53

== Personnel ==
Credits adapted from the album's liner notes.

=== Upchuck ===
- Kaila "KT" Thompson – vocals
- Mikey Durham – guitar
- Hoff – guitar
- Ausar Ward – bass guitar, vocals
- Chris Salado – vocals
- Daniel Lane – drums

=== Additional contributors ===
- Ty Segall (Note: Segall is credited under his real name and as Herman.) – production, mixing, tambourine on "Kept Inside", guitar solo on "Lost One"
- Mario Ramirez – engineering
- Heba Kadry – mastering
- Ian Cone – cover photo
- Ebru Yildiz – back cover photo
- Cyrus Lubin – insert photos
