= Girl with Fish =

Studio album by Feeble Little Horse
- Released: June 9, 2023
- Genres: Indie rock; shoegaze
- Length: 26:02
- Language: English
- Label: Saddle Creek
- Producers: Sebastian Kinsler; Ryan Walchonski

Feeble Little Horse chronology
Hayday (2021)	Girl with Fish (2023)	Bitknot (2026)

Girl with Fish is the second full-length studio album by American indie rock band Feeble Little Horse, released by Saddle Creek Records on June 9, 2023. It has received positive reviews from critics.

== Reception ==
Editors at AnyDecentMusic? rated this album a 7.5 out of 10, based on seven reviews. Girl with Fish received universal acclaim from critics noted at review aggregator Metacritic. It has a weighted average score of 82 out of 100, based on nine reviews.

In Alternative Press, Sadie Bell praised the album, writing that it was "one of the most delightfully delirious indie albums of the year". Will Yarbrough, in a review for The Line of Best Fit gave the album a score of 8 out of 10, praising Lydia Slocum's lyrics and summing up, "with an album this good, feeble little horse are bound for the winner's circle". Ethan Beck of No Ripcord gave Girl with Fish a 9 out of 10, writing that the band "knows exactly when and how to spike their songs with twee textures, disgusted lyrics, dreamy love songs, and noisy freakouts" and considers them "one of the biggest bands working in indie rock right now". In Paste, Samantha Sullivan rated the album an 8.2 out of 10, and characterized Girl with Fish as "a fearless album that blends delicate acoustics and seismic shoegaze". On June 19, the magazine did a ranking of the best albums of the year to date, placing this at third for being the "recording project of curious young experimentalists" and exhorting readers that "it's time to embrace the fun in scratchy pop". Pitchfork gave the album the "Best New Music" distinction, and in a review of the album, Quinn Moreland rated it an 8.2 out of 10, praising it as a "short yet richly textured album full of fuzzy melodic hooks and beguiling left turns" that "goes for the sprint without ever feeling rushed or overstuffed". Slant Magazine's Charles Lyons-Burt characterized the album as "an economical calling card and the sound of a band coming into their own" and rated it 3.5 out of 5 stars. Stereogum proclaimed Girl with Fish the "Album of the Week" and reviewer James Rettig wrote that "Slocum shines clear through the band's jumble", with music that "threads the needle between carefully composed and gleefully chaotic; through the unexpected sonic whips of their mangled rock songs, there's an emotional through-line that's impossible to ignore". In a June round-up of the best albums of 2023, the publication placed this at fifth, with Rettig writing that it "separates [Feeble Little Horse] from the pack, establishing them as a band that can turn muddy and indistinct experiments into real songs, with piled-on hooks and sardonic lyrics delivered by Lydia Slocum, their not-so-secret weapon".

Writing for Exclaim!, Amanda Thacker gave this album an 8 out of 10, stating that on this release the band ascends "to a whole new level of relentless unpredictability—one that's impossible to turn away from". NME's Mia Hughes rated this album 3 out of 5 stars, writing that "the band marry touches of noise rock and DIY-minded pop, and the different sensibilities clash in interesting ways", but also stating that Slcoum's absurdist lyrics "perhaps keeps these songs from being as memorable as they could be, it does occasionally work, shaping the album into a really nice cut of slacker-noise". In The Skinny, Tony Inglis gave Girl with Fish 4 out of 5 stars for having "dry witted, capricious fuzz-pop", particularly praising Slocum's lyrics and vocals.

In June 2023, Alternative Press published an unranked list of the top 25 albums of the year to date and included this release, calling it "ushers in a new era of shoegaze that is unpredictable, playful, and light". In a mid-year review, Rolling Stone India included this release in their best albums of 2023. Editors at Paste chose this for the 27th best album of 2023. Editors at Stereogum ranked this album 39th best of 2023. Editors at Pitchfork included this in their list of the 37 best rock albums of 2023. Critics at Rolling Stone included this among the 40 best indie rock albums of 2023.

== Track listing ==
All songs written by Jake Kelley, Seb Kinsler, Lydia Slocum, and Ryan Wlachonski.

1. "Freak" – 1:48
2. "Tin Man" – 2:11
3. "Steamroller" – 3:25
4. "Heaven" – 1:55
5. "Paces" – 2:45
6. "Sweet" – 2:35
7. "Slide" – 2:28
8. "Healing" – 1:38
9. "Pocket" – 2:40
10. "Station" – 2:24
11. "Heavy Water" – 2:17

== Personnel ==
Feeble Little Horse

- Jake Kelley – drums, vocals on "Tin Man", recording, mixing
- Seb Kinsler – bass guitar, keyboards and synthesizer on all tracks except "Freak", guitar, vocals on "Sweet", recording, mixing, production
- Lydia Slocum – vocals, keyboards and synthesizer on "Pocket", recording, mixing
- Ryan Walchonski – guitar on "Steamroller", "Heaven", "Paces", "Sweet", "Slide", "Healing", "Station", and "Heavy Water"; keyboards and synthesizer on "Tin Man", "Heaven", "Slide", and "Healing"; vocals on "Slide"; recording; mixing; production

Additional personnel

- Heba Kadry – mastering
- Connor Peters – bass guitar on "Paces"

== See also ==
- List of 2023 albums
