= Night Gallery (album) =

Studio album by Eternal Tapestry and Sun Araw
- Released: April 19, 2011
- Recorded: March 2010
- Studio: KVRX, Austin, Texas, US
- Genre: Acid rock
- Length: 38:32
- Label: Thrill Jockey

Eternal Tapestry chronology
Beyond the 4th Door (2011)	Night Gallery (2011)	Brainwave Entertainment (2011)

Night Gallery is a 2011 studio album by American psychedelic rock and space rock band Eternal Tapestry and Sun Araw. It has received positive reviews from critics.

== Reception ==
According to the review aggregator Metacritic, Night Gallery received "generally favorable reviews" based on a weighted average score of 72 out of 100 from 6 critic scores.

Editors at AllMusic rated this album 4 out of 5 stars, with critic Thom Jurek writing that this was a "made-in-hallucinogenic-heaven collaboration between nocturnal psych giants Eternal Tapestry and drone master Sun Araw" that makes for a recording "free of noodling or self indulgence; it proves that acid jam is alive and well in the hands of the right musicians". Ron Hart of Blurt scored this release an 8 out of 10, characterizing this collaboration as "a solid 45 minutes of AAM-cum-CAN spiritual madness" and Sun Araw's work as "continu[ing] to redefine the freak-out for the digital age, leading the pack of new young mindbenders looking to rock music down paths not yet explored without fear or frenzy". A review by Samuel Breen in Fact stated that "the fine line between sludgy pastoral riffing and "bogged down" is just about negotiated as the record explores territory novel to both acts" with "an unease which runs through the record as difficult dialogue, only countered by its ebullient use of dissonance".

Editors at Pitchfork scored this release 7.0 out of 10 and critic Aaron Leitko characterized this recording as "a 40-minute jam session... with unsurprisingly trippy results [that] flows like a single, continuous piece" and continued that the musical acts "mesh well", making "a match made in a UV lamp-lit and sage-scented stoner-rock heaven". PopMatters' Scott Branson scored this work a 7 out of 10, stating that "although the album itself is heavily indebted to its Krautrock and psychedelic influences, it refreshingly scuttles innovation for the incomparable excitement of live sound—so often overlooked in the hype-dominated scene of instant internet releases" and "as the album title implies, this sound has a darkness to it, gripping tightly to that fine line between good and bad trip".

== Track listing ==
1. "Night Gallery I" – 8:54
2. "Night Gallery II" – 9:50
3. "Night Gallery III" – 5:45
4. "Night Gallery IV" – 14:04

Bonus track on some editions

5. "The Painted Mirror" – 13:32

Bonus track on Japanese editions

5. "Night Gallery (Reprise)" – 10:57

== Personnel ==
- Jed Bindeman – drums
- Nick Bindeman – guitar
- Ryan Carlile – tenor saxophone
- Krag Likins – bass guitar
- Dewey Mahood – guitar
- Sun Araw – guitar

== See also ==
- 2011 in American music
- 2011 in rock music
- List of 2011 albums
