= ...EP =

EP by Mandy, Indiana
- Released: 19 November 2021
- Genre: Noise rock
- Length: 24:56
- Language: French
- Label: Fire Talk
- Producer: Scott Fair

Mandy, Indiana chronology
...EP (2021)	I've Seen a Way (2023)

...EP is a 2021 EP from British noise rock band Mandy, Indiana.

== Reception ==
Writing for Pitchfork Media, Max Freedman scored this release a 7.6 out of 10, writing that the music "walks a fine line between violent and groovy", particularly noting the strength of Valentine Caulfield's vocals. John Amen of The Line of Best Fit rated this EP eight out of 10, writing that they "have forged a surprisingly distinct sound in the well-populated post-punk/noise-rock milieu" but that the album "arguably lacks a definitive cohesion".

== Track listing ==
1. "Bottle Episode" – 4:39
2. "Nike of Samothrace" – 3:17
3. "Alien 3" – 6:17
4. "Alien 3" (Daniel Avery Remix) – 5:28
5. "Nike of Samothrace" (Club Eat Remix) – 5:15

== Personnel ==
Mandy, Indiana

- Valentine Caulfield – vocals
- Scott Fair – guitar, production
- Liam Stewart – percussion

Additional personnel

- Daniel Avery – remixing
- Club Eat – remixing

== See also ==
- List of 2021 albums
