= Means to Me =

Studio album by Long Beard
- Released: September 13, 2019
- Genre: Rock; dream pop
- Length: 36:43
- Label: Double Double Whammy
- Producer: Leslie Bear; Craig Hendrix

Long Beard chronology
Sleepwalker (2015)	Means to Me (2019)

Singles from Means to Me
- 1. "Sweetheart" Released: July 1, 2019; 2. "Means To Me" Released: July 30, 2019; 3. "Getting By" Released: August 20, 2019

Means to Me is the second studio album by American dream pop artist Long Beard, released on September 13, 2019, through Double Double Whammy.

== Release and promotion ==
=== Singles ===
The album's first single "Sweetheart" was released alongside the announcement of the album on July 1, 2019, it marked her first release since her 2015 album Sleepwalker. On July 30, 2019, the album's title track was released as the second single and, on August 20, 2019, the track "Getting By" was released as the album's third and final single.

== Critical reception ==
Professional ratings
Review scores
Source	Rating
Paste	6.5/10
Pitchfork	7.0/10
Under the Radar	6.5/10 stars

Means to Me received good reviews from music critics. Critics applauded Leslie Bear's vocal delivery and vivid imagery, but found that the later half of the album was too indiscernible.

== Track listing ==
All songs written by Leslie Bear and produced by Leslie Bear & Craig Hendrix. Credits adapted from Bandcamp.

No.	Title	Length
1.	"Countless"	1:33
2.	"Getting By"	3:45
3.	"Snow Globe"	5:23
4.	"Sweetheart"	5:34
5.	"Empty Bottle"	1:47
6.	"In The Morning"	2:51
7.	"Forever"	4:05
8.	"Means To Me"	3:44
9.	"Monarch"	3:56
10.	"The Last"	4:00
Total length:		36:43

== Personnel ==
Credits are adapted from Bandcamp.

Musicians

- Leslie Bear – vocals, production, guitar, synth/keys
- Craig Hendrix – production, bass, percussion, engineering, mixing
- Heba Kadry – mastering

Artwork

- Adan Carlo – photography
- Jaime Knoth – layout, design
