= I've Seen a Way =

Studio album by Mandy, Indiana
- Released: 19 May 2023
- Recorded: 2022
- Studio: The Mount Wthout (Crypt), Bristol, England, United Kingdom; The Nave, Leeds, England, United Kingdom; Soup, Manchester, England, United Kingdom; Wookey Hole Caves
- Genre: Experimental rock; noise rock
- Length: 37:03
- Language: English, French
- Label: Fire Talk
- Producer: Scott Fair

Mandy, Indiana chronology
| ...EP (2021) | I've Seen a Way (2023) | Urgh (2026) |

Singles from i've seen a way
- 1. "Injury Detail" Released: 17 January 2023; 2. "Pinking Shears" Released: 1 May 2023

I've Seen a Way is the debut full-length studio album by English noise rock band Mandy, Indiana, released through Fire Talk on 19 May 2023. Recorded in caves, crypts, and shopping malls, this release has received positive reviews from critics.

== Reception ==
I've Seen a Way received positive reviews from critics noted at review aggregator Metacritic. It has a weighted average score of 79 out of 100, based on nine reviews.

Editors at AllMusic rated this release a 3.5 out of five stars, calling it an Album Pick, with reviewer Paul Simpson summing up that the band "clearly make music with the intention to disrupt, confront, and force the listener to question society's ethics, and their first album succeeds at all of these points". Editors at Pitchfork chose this release as the Best New Music, with critic Ryan Leas scoring it an 8.3 out of 10, writing that this "is a purposefully disorienting album: an idiosyncratic collision of familiar elements that blurs genres and defamiliarizes language... the music is abrasive, but in its most shocking moments, the band allows beauty to shine through the grime and static". Marc Hogan of that site proposed Grammy Award picks and nominated this release for Grammy Award for Best Dance/Electronic Music Album. In The Quietus, Will Salmon similarly writes that this is "a visceral and strange album, one that revels in its abstractions, but is direct in what it has to say", noting that the group has managed to expand on its sound since 2021's ...EP. An NME profile of the group wrote that this album "glows with experimental, urgent post-punk that champions resistance and chaos". Nick Roseblade of Clash rated I've Seen a Way a seven out of 10, for being "surprising, but oddly delightful" with a level of ferocity that discourages long-time listening sessions. Ben Devlin of musicOMH scored this album four out of five stars for "spiky, rebellious sentiments" that he recommends to fans of electronic and industrial music. Another seven out of 10 came from Jason Anderson in Uncut, for the "brutalist, nightmarish soundscapes" that the band draws on from a post-punk perspective. John Amen of Beats Per Minute gave the album a score of 76% and wrote, "While i've seen a way naturally suggests an atheistic vision, it also ironically reaches for something eternal that exists beyond the horrific tortuosities of sociopolitical evolution. Life, God, Spirit, The Way... Mandy, Indiana never lose sight of their aesthetic and existential north star, despite how convincingly they navigate despair."

In a June round-up of the best albums of 2023, Stereogum placed this at 46, with critic James Rettig writing that "tracks rise and fall unexpectedly, and amid the twisted and turned and pulse-poundingly mangled sounds, an environment starts to emerge — one filled with clanging and clamor and a devilish cool". Editors at Pitchfork chose this as the 20th best album of 2023, and included it on their list of the 37 best rock albums of 2023. In The Guardian, this was ranked the 44th best album of 2023. musicOMH's round-up of the year's best albums rated this number 30. Editors at Spin included this among the albums of the year. Editors at online retailer Qobuz included this on their list of the best rock albums of 2023. Editors at BrooklynVegan included this on their list of the 55 best albums of 2023 and this was also included in the 40 best independent albums of 2023 in the Indie Basement department. At Under the Radar, this was rated the 92nd best album of 2023.

== Track listing ==
All tracks written by Mandy, Indiana. Lyrics on "Mosaick" and "The Driving Rain (18)" from Charles Baudelaire's poem "L'Invitation au voyage". "Iron Maiden" contains a sample of Toni Collette as featured in Hereditary.

1. "Love Theme (4K VHS)" – 3:17
2. "Drag (Crashed)" – 4:27
3. "Pinking Shears" – 2:32
4. "Injury Detail" – 4:16
5. "Mosaick" – 0:58
6. "The Driving Rain (18)" – 2:45
7. "2 Stripe" – 5:55
8. "Iron Maiden" – 2:35
9. "Peach Fuzz" – 4:44
10. "(ノ>ω<)ノ :。・:*:・゚'★,。・:*:♪・゚'☆ (Crystal Aura Redux)" – 3:00
11. "Sensitivity Training" – 2:34

== Personnel ==
Mandy, Indiana

- Simon Catling – synthesizer
- Valentine Caulfield – vocals
- Scott Fair – guitar, mix engineering, production
- Alex Macdougall – drums

Additional personnel

- Dr. Me – design, layout
- Daniel Fox – mix engineer
- Alex Greaves – vocal engineering
- Isaac Jones – drums on "Drag (Crashed)", "Pinking Shears", Injury Detail", "The Driving Rain (18)", "2 Stripe", "Peach Fuzz", and "Sensitivity Training"
- Joe Jones – recording engineering
- Heba Kadry – mastering
- Jared Pike – cover art
- Harry Steel – photography
- Robin Stewart – mix engineer
- Thighpaulsandra – Mellotron on "Sensitivity Training"

== See also ==
- 2023 in British music
- List of 2023 albums
