= Urgh =

Studio album by Mandy, Indiana
- Released: 6 February 2026
- Studios: Greenmount (Leeds); Airtight (Manchester); Flow (Berlin)
- Length: 34:28
- Label: Sacred Bones
- Producers: Scott Fair; Daniel Fox

Mandy, Indiana chronology
I've Seen a Way (2023)	Urgh (2026)

Singles from Urgh
- 1. "Magazine" Released: 12 November 2025

Urgh (stylized in all caps) is the second studio album by English-French noise rock band Mandy, Indiana. It was released on 6 February 2026 through Sacred Bones Records. The album received critical acclaim.

== Background and development ==
Following the release of their debut studio album I've Seen a Way (2023), Mandy, Indiana announced the album on 12 November 2025, alongside the release of the lead single, "Magazine". Urgh marks the first time all four band members actively participated in the songwriting process, with the intention of broadening their sonic palette. During its creation, vocalist Valentine Caulfield and drummer Alex Macdougall both underwent different kinds of surgery, which informed the album's themes of "inner pain and external chaos".

== Critical reception ==
Professional ratings
Aggregate scores
Source	Rating
Any Decent Music	8.1/10
Metacritic	85/100
Review scores
Source	Rating
Clash	8/10
DIY	4/5 stars
Exclaim!	9/10
The Guardian	5/5 stars
The Line of Best Fit	7/10
Pitchfork	8.5/10
Beats Per Minute	86%

According to the review aggregator Metacritic, Urgh received "universal acclaim" based on a weighted average score of 85 out of 100 from sixteen critic scores. The review aggregator Any Decent Music gave the album a weighted average score of 8.1 out of 10 from sixteen critic scores. Critics praised the album's intense energy and experimental approach to noise rock.

Writing for The Guardian, Laura Snapes awarded the album a perfect score, highlighting drummer Alex Macdougall's "incredible versatility" and vocalist Valentine Caulfield's "staccato delivery", noting that the songs move at an "addictively free" pace that is "often stalled by squalling winds and thrashing noise". Writing for Pitchfork, Walden Green awarded the album a score of 8.5 out of 10 and praised its "visceral" intensity, highlighting the band's "distinctive sound", which blends elements of "industrial, post-punk, and '80s neo-noir soundtrack" aesthetics.

Marko Djurdjić of Exclaim! described the record as "the first great album of 2026", calling it both "cathartic" and "exorcistic" in its intensity. Hazel Blacher of DIY wrote that the album is built on "harsh, techno-charged industrial abrasions" and ventures into new territory with "hip-hop-adjacent structures", signifying "unabashed growth". Further amplifying the group's evolving sound, Clash's Nick Roseblade called it a "strong, and brave, album" as well as "bigger and better than their debut", describing the band as one to watch in 2026.

Writing for Beats Per Minute, John Amen praised the album, commenting, "With URGH, Mandy, Indiana refuse to shy away from the suffering we exact and endure ... Caulfield’s rape, and her recovery, are presumably the project’s fuel; that experience, however, has been reframed, highlighting the more systemic dehumanization that happens each day on micro and macro levels".

== Track listing ==
All music is composed by Mandy Lee, Scott Fair, Daniel Fox, and Valentin Torres.

Urgh track listing
No.	Title	Length
1.	"Sevastopol"	2:22
2.	"Magazine"	3:30
3.	"Try Saying"	2:32
4.	"Dodecahedron"	3:22
5.	"A Brighter Tomorrow"	3:05
6.	"Life Hex"	4:19
7.	"Ist halt so"	3:58
8.	"Sicko!"	3:25
9.	"Cursive"	4:26
10.	"I'll Ask Her"	3:29
Total length:		34:28

== Personnel ==
Credits adapted from the album's liner notes and Tidal.

=== Mandy, Indiana ===
- Scott Fair – electric guitar, production, mixing, drums recording, layout
- Valentine Caulfield – vocals, layout
- Simon Catling – percussion, synthesizer, layout
- Alex Macdougall – drums, layout

=== Additional contributors ===
- Daniel Fox – production, mixing, vocal recording
- Heba Kadry – mastering
- Jacob Clements – mastering assistance
- Rob Slater – drum engineering
- Seadna McPhail – synthesizer engineering
- Billy Woods – vocals on "Sicko!"
- Steel Tipped Dove – Billy Woods vocal recording on "Sicko!"
- Erika Cervantes – additional vocals on "Life Hex"
- Beth Townsend – additional vocals on "Life Hex"
- Niko Van Eimeren – additional vocals on "Life Hex"
- Kara Hart – additional vocals on "Life Hex"
- BFTT – additional production on "Brighter Tomorrow"
- Carnovsky – cover art
- Mercy Charlotte – layout

== Charts ==
Chart performance for Urgh
Chart (2026)	Peak position
Scottish Albums (Official Charts)	71
UK Albums Sales (OCC)	37
UK Dance Albums (Official Charts)	1
UK Independent Albums (Official Charts)	23
