= Wild Strawberries (album) =

Studio album by Eternal Tapestry
- Released: February 24, 2015
- Recorded: September 2013
- Studio: Zigzag, Oregon, US
- Genre: Jam band; psychedelic rock; space rock
- Length: 78:58
- Label: Thrill Jockey

Eternal Tapestry chronology
Lolo Pass Drifters (2015)	Wild Strawberries (2015)	Sleeping on a Dandelion (2016)

“I don’t think I could imagine a better way to spend time than to just take a leave from home and city and get away to somewhere where you’re disconnected from things. You just focus on the people there and you wake up, eat, play music, smoke some turkey, drink some Kool-Aid, and then call it a day.”

—Eternal Tapestry frontman Nick Bindeman on the decision to record Wild Strawberries in a secluded cabin in rural Oregon

Wild Strawberries is a 2015 studio album by American psychedelic rock and space rock band Eternal Tapestry. It was recorded in a rural cabin with music builds upon the band's psychedelic sound to include nature references and more simple jams; it has received positive reviews from critics.

== Reception ==
Editors at AnyDecentMusic? rated this release 6.6 out of 10, aggregating 7 critic scores. According to the review aggregator Metacritic, Wild Strawberries received "generally favorable reviews" based on a weighted average score of 70 out of 100 from 9 critic scores.

Editors at AllMusic rated this album 4 out of 5 stars, with critic Fred Thomas writing that "there's a grainy, relaxed feeling that runs throughout the massive album, one where just eight tracks stretch out infinitely in a web of sounds somewhere between the woodsy womb of the remote cabin and the cold, unknown reaches of space", further opining that "the jams on Wild Strawberries are more considered and inspired than any of Eternal Tapestry's previous work, and present the most cohesive picture of their long, strange progression". In The Austin Chronicle, Greg Beets gave Wild Strawberries 3.5 out of 5 stars, stating that "this instrumental exploration of psych's deep catacombs never feels anything less than deliberate". Writing for Blurt, Michael Toland scored this work 3 out of 5 stars, characterizing the music as "mixing burbling synthesizers and meandering guitars with a lack of rhythm and a laidback vibe" to make "a workable nexus between cosmic and pastoral".

Editors at Pitchfork scored this release 6.2 out of 10 and critic Nick Nyeland characterized this as "a set of cosmic music with an earthy tone, slowly ricocheting between the stars and the ground" and continued that while not all songs coalesce, "it's still intermittently impressive how they manage to zone in on a sharp piece of mystical riffing or lay out on an elegant ambient plane". At PopMatters, Ian King gave this album a 7 out of 10, calling this "Earth-minded space rock of its own kind, but the spirit is faithful to the legacy of its paisley-clad forefathers". In Louder Sound's Prog, Kris Needs stated that "even the most fearless exponents of weird prog rarely reach such heady realms of unfettered sonic exploration as Oregon space foragers Eternal Tapestry" and this is "their latest outing and most expansive project yet", with sounds echoing The Doors, Pink Floyd, and Quicksilver Messenger Service. Sophie Cooper of The Quietus called Wild Strawberries "a more relaxed approach" than previous Eternal Tapestry releases, where "things stay fairly mellow throughout, providing a pleasant but not especially engaging listen", making for "an enjoyable record and there are some interesting moments, it’s just that the overall sound sort of politely hangs in the background with not much cutting through the haze".

Matt B. Weir of Tiny Mixtapes scored this work a 2.5 out of 5, stating that "the best thing to know about Wild Strawberries is that, unlike much of the other Eternal Tapestry music I’ve heard, this one has a lot of yummy, tasty, Popol Vuh-ian, synth-led dreamscape psyche... [with the] second disc... often a wash of electronic pulses, keyboards, diving guitar lines, and cascading rhythms that coalesce into something greater than the sum of their parts", but continuing that the last first two long jams drag on, making the album "feel... awkwardly escapist, and the listener is reminded that the whole disc actually feels rather laid-back". In Willamette Week, Dave Cantor called this album "as fragile as any German synth extravaganza from the 1970s".

== Track listing ==
1. "Mountain Primrose" – 4:59
2. "Wild Strawberries" – 15:23
3. "Enchanter's Nightshade" – 16:07
4. "Woodland Anemone" – 2:00
5. "Maidenhair Spleenwort" – 8:40
6. "Lace Fern" – 10:22
7. "Pale-Green Sedge" – 5:53
8. "White Adder's Tongue" – 15:34

Bonus track on some editions

9. "The Sun and the Still-Born Stars" – 7:06

== Personnel ==
Eternal Tapestry

- Jed Bindeman – drums
- Nick Bindeman – guitar
- Krag Likins – bass guitar
- Warren Lee – organ

Additional personnel

- Natalie Anne Howard – artwork
- Tony Remple – layout

== See also ==
- 2015 in American music
- 2015 in rock music
- List of 2015 albums
