= A World Out of Time (album) =

Studio album by Eternal Tapestry
- Released: November 13, 2012
- Genre: Psychedelic rock
- Length: 42:56
- Label: Thrill Jockey

Eternal Tapestry chronology
Dawn in 2 Dimensions (2012)	A World Out of Time (2012)	Prometheus Rising (2012)

A World Out of Time is a 2012 studio album by American psychedelic rock and space rock band Eternal Tapestry. It has received positive reviews from critics.

== Reception ==
Editors at AnyDecentMusic? rated this release 6.6 out of 10, aggregating 6 critic scores. According to the review aggregator Metacritic, A World Out of Time received "generally favorable reviews" based on a weighted average score of 70 out of 100 from 8 critic scores.

Editors at AllMusic rated this album 4 out of 5 stars, with critic Thom Jurek writing that this album "marks a departure" from the band's earlier sound, continuing that they "haven't left their late psychedelic and experimental tropes behind, but they've honed them sharply", with varied instrumentation and the addition of folk music elements that results in "a near perfect balance of precision and exploration that walks the tightrope between organic live playing and focused studio attention". In Blurt, Jennifer Kelly rated this release a 7 out of 10, calling it "incredibly freewheeling, with space-soaring guitar solos blasting off from tightly coiled vamps ("When I Was in Your Mind"), eastern-droning harmonies bubbling out from super-electric synth squiggles ("Planetoid 127"), and howling psychedelic riffs erupting from the steady wash of rain ("When Gravity Falls")". Writing for CMJ New Music Monthly, Dan Jackson stated that "the band does such a clever job of building a little world of reference and allusion, that lyrics would spoil the fun of connecting the cultural dots", showing affection for 1960s psychedelic rock and vintage science fiction. Editors at Pitchfork scored this release 7.0 out of 10 and critic Marc Masters called this Eternal Tapestry's "most collage-oriented release, offering varied sounds fused with hard cuts, cross-fades, and outdoorsy ambiance" and summed up that "their unapologetic sound [and commitment to psychedelic rock] isn't an opportunistic gloss on the past, but rather a full-on exploration that enhances and moves history forward. Writing for Under the Radar, J. Pace gave this album 6.5 out of 10 stars, stating that "musically, this orbits the sloppy, manic side of the Krautrock or psych universe, bringing to mind Amon Düül II at their most addled, Faust at their most obtuse, or Pärson Sound at their most insistent".

== Track listing ==
1. "When I Was in Your Mind" – 12:38
2. "Planetoid 127" – 1:25
3. "Alone Against Tomorrow" – 6:48
4. "The Weird Stone" – 7:11
5. "Apocalypse Troll" – 2:11
6. "When Gravity Fails" – 3:28
7. "The Currents of Space" – 4:49
8. "Sand into Rain" – 4:26

== Personnel ==
Eternal Tapestry

- Jed Bindeman – drums
- Nick Bindeman – guitar
- Ryan Carlile – saxophone
- Krag Likins – bass guitar
- Dewey Mahood – guitar

Additional personnel

- Maria Joan Dixon – cover painting

== See also ==
- 2012 in American music
- 2012 in rock music
- List of 2012 albums
