= Indian Handcrafts =

Canadian stoner metal band

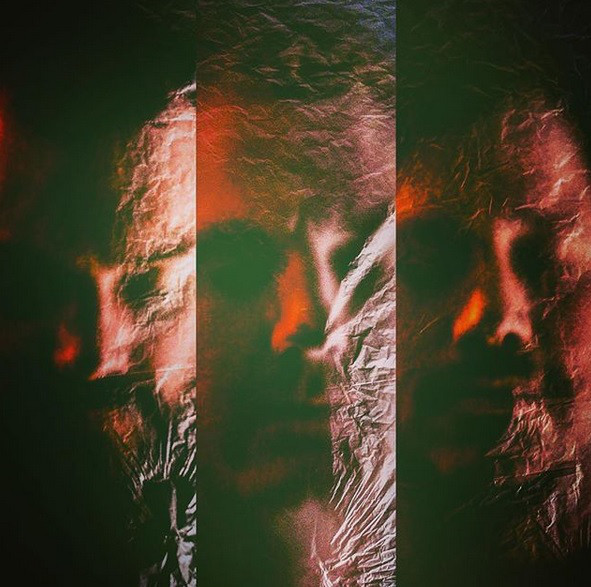
- Brandyn James Aikins (left), Leland Burmania (centre), and Daniel Brandon Allen (right).

Background information
- Origin: Barrie, Ontario, Canada
- Genres: Speed metal, stoner rock, heavy metal, progressive metal
- Years active: 2010–present
- Labels: Sargent House, Atrial Records
- Members: Brandyn James Aikins; Daniel Brandon Allen; Leland Burmania
- Website: www.indianhandcrafts.ca

Indian Handcrafts are a stoner metal band from Barrie, Ontario, Canada, consisting of members Brandyn James Aikins, Daniel Brandon Allen, and Leland Burmania.

== Biography ==
Indian Handcrafts first formed in 2010 while Brandyn James Aikins and Daniel Brandon Allen were playing together in another band. Indian Handcrafts came together after the two realized that, as the only members in the band who got along, they would be better off as a dynamic duo. Breaking off into their own band, the pair built a sound based on a solid foundation of riff-centric sludge rock tinged with a psychedelic atmosphere, with Allen on guitars, Aikins on drums, and both handling vocal duties. A year later they had created an eponymous self-released album.

In August 2011, they emerged onto the music scene proper, with the release of a music video for the demo version of a song called "Red Action"; which would be later re-released on their first signed record. They subsequently went on a self-promoted tour, during which time they were noticed by record label owner Cathy Pellow, who soon after signed them to her management and Los Angeles based record label, Sargent House.

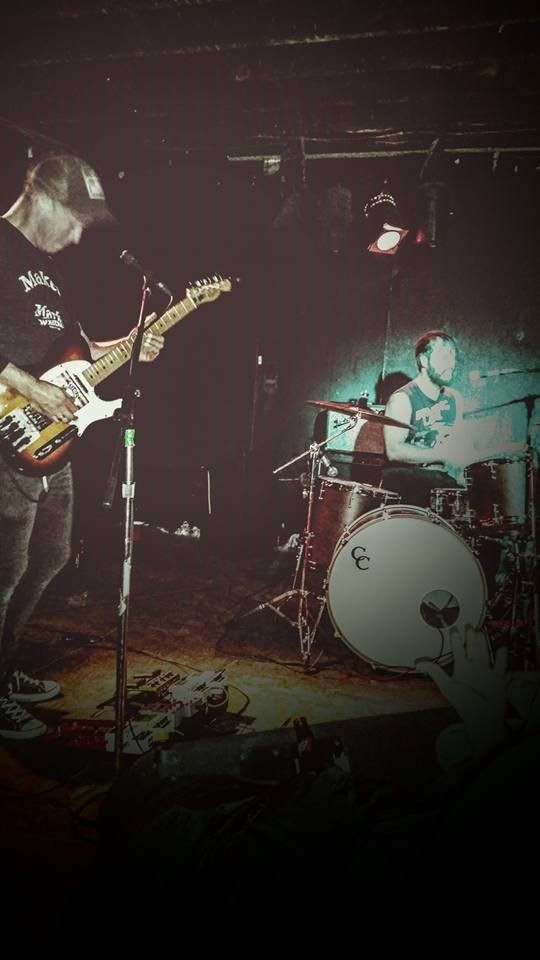
Indian Handcrafts performing at long-time punk venue, Call the Office in London, Ontario, on November 10, 2015.

=== Civil Disobedience for Losers (2012–2013) ===
In 2012, the band traveled to Sound of Sirens Studio in California with Japanese producer and musical engineer Toshi Kasai to create their second album, Civil Disobedience for Losers, which was then released on October 30, 2012. Their first signed release features guest appearances by Melvins drummers Dale Crover and Coady Willis. Following the release of the album, the group embarked on the North American leg of Canadian punk rock band, Billy Talent's Dead Silence Tour from March 14, 2013, to April 16, 2012. This included opening for Hollerado, Sum 41 and Billy Talent for the first leg of the tour. During the second leg, Sum 41 was switched out for the band Monster Truck.

On May 24, 2013, Indian Handcrafts uploaded a music video for "Bruce Lee", the first track from Civil Disobedience for Losers onto YouTube. Shortly after the release, Canadian entertainment magazine, Exclaim! published a review stating "if you've got a thing for vintage kung fu movies, then you're going to want to check out the new video for Indian Handcrafts' tune 'Bruce Lee'. This riff-rocking opening cut from last year's Civil Disobedience for Losers shows the duo battling it out in a paper-walled room. There are headbands, nunchucks and roundhouse kicks galore, while the grainy film quality adds to the B movie chic. You might even notice a couple pro wrestling moves thrown in for fun."

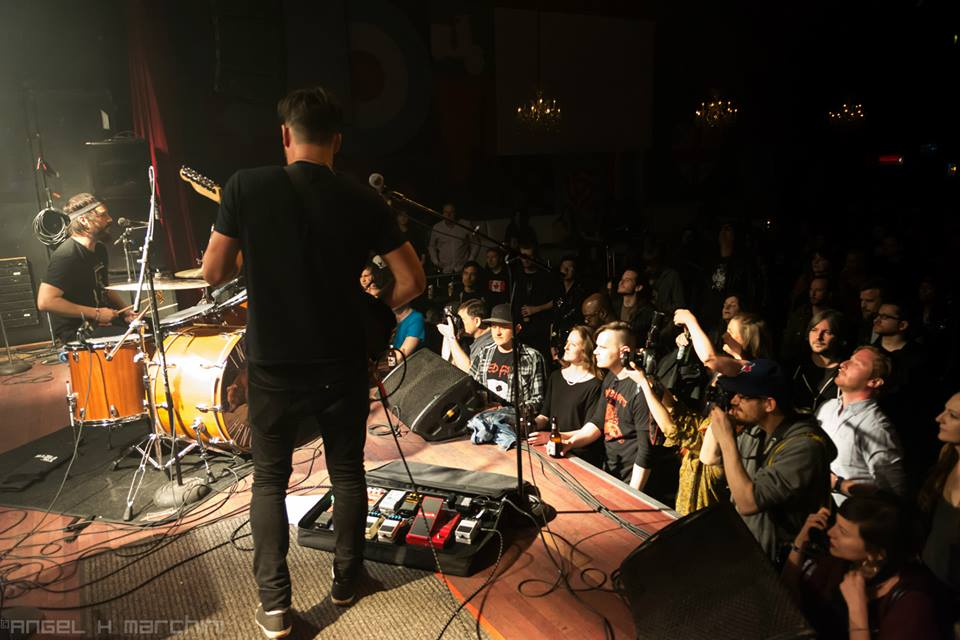
Indian Handcrafts performing at The Mod Club Theatre in Toronto, Ontario on May 10, 2014.

From August 10–11, 2013, Indian Handcrafts performed at the Heavy Montreal music festival.

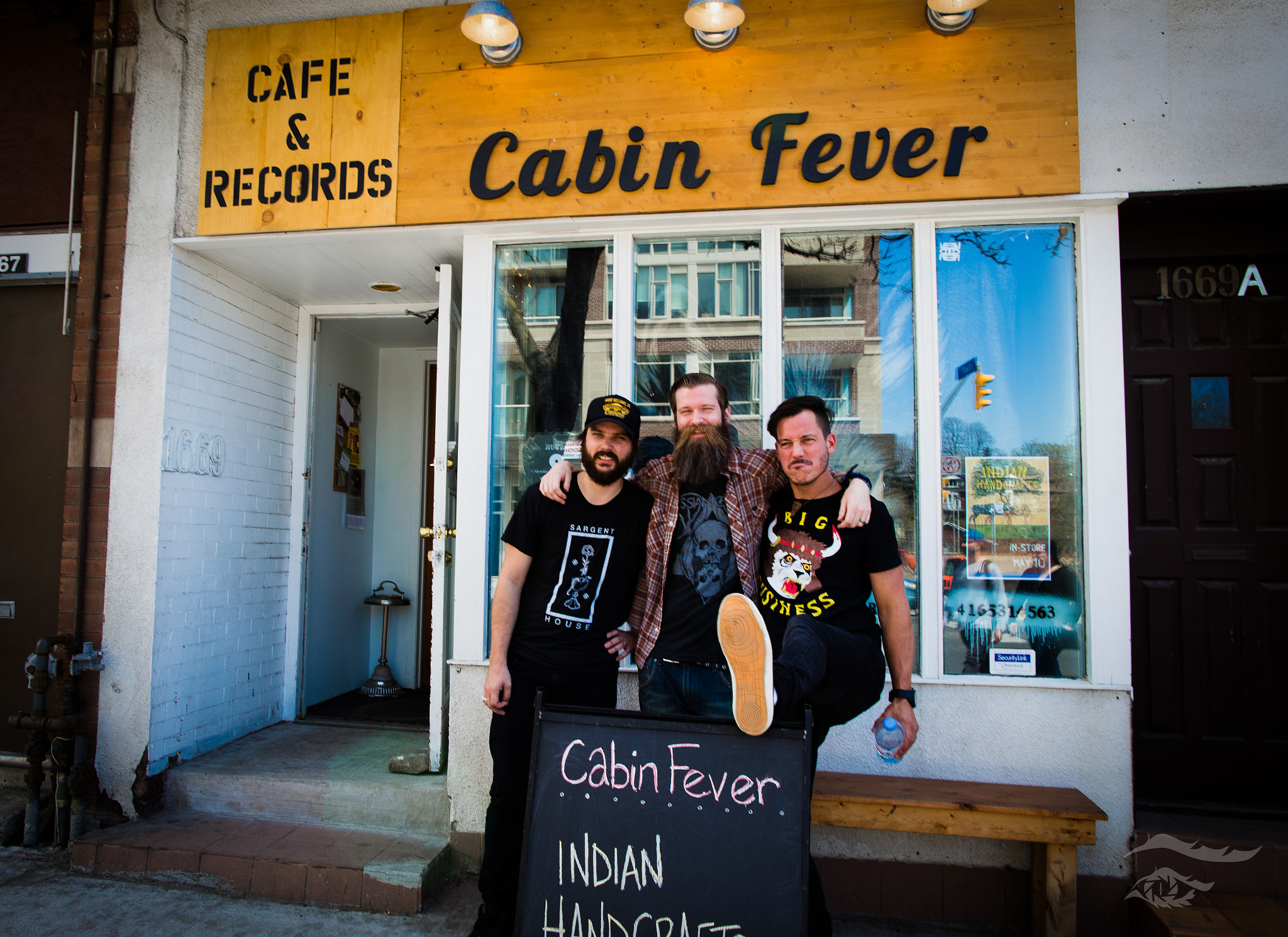
Indian Handcrafts in Toronto, May 2014

=== "Swamp Child" and Creeps (2014–2018) ===
In January 2014, the duo teamed up with Scion AV for their Scion Rock Show single series. As a result, the group released a split 7-inch with Memphis, Tennessee, rock band, Dirty Streets which contained two tracks; one per band. Indian Handcraft's contributed single, "Swamp Child", recorded with Toshi Kasai, and featured guitar work by King Buzzo, a founding member of the classic sludge metal band, Melvins.

For six dates In September 2014, Indian Handcrafts traveled to various Canadian and U.S. venues with the groups, No Joy and Deafheaven.

Kicking off on September 11, 2015, the band joined the lineup for Riot Fest beginning in Chicago, Illinois, before moving onto Toronto, Canada.

The band's sophomore album, Creeps, was released on October 2, 2015. In promotion of their new release, on October 6, 2015, in St. Petersburg, Florida, the band began a North American tour with bands, Kylesa, Inter Arma, and Irata as their support. The opening bands were switched out starting on November 10, 2015, in London, Ontario, and the group was then supported for the rest of the tour by Toronto-based band, Greys.

=== Bastard, "Warsaw" and Empress in Decline (2018–present) ===
In early 2017, fellow Barrian, Leland Burmania joined the group, changing the dynamic to a trio. On May 11, 2018, the band released an EP entitled Bastard through Barrie based record company, Atrial Records and recorded with and mixed by Andrew Shropshire. Upon release, the EP was available exclusively as a cassette tape. On May 7, 2021, through various streaming platforms, the group released a cover of Joy Division's song "Warsaw" from their planned debut album of the same name.

The following year, the band joined forces once again with Toshi Kasai, who produced and mixed their latest LP release, Empress in Decline. Of the new addition to their discography, the group's official Bandcamp page said the following:

"The name Empress In Decline came about during the pandemic. When we were on shut down and looking at mortality on a global level, we felt it was representative of the time and what the planet had been going through for years with climate change, civil disobedience, and everyone at each others throats"

== Band members ==
- Brandyn James Aikins - drums, vocals (2010–present)
- Daniel Brandon Allen - lead guitar, vocals (2010–present)
- Leland Burmania - bass, vocals (2017–present)

== Discography ==
=== Albums ===
Year	Album details	Track listing
2011	Indian Handcrafts (LP): Release date: May 20, 2011; Label: Independent	All songs written by Brandyn James Aikins and Daniel Brandon Allen: 1. Drop Out (3:54); 2. Red Action (3:09); 3. Starcraft (4:45); 4. Microwave Lunch (3:38); 5. The Jerk (3:27); 6. Jack Lord (2:08); 7. Centauri Teenage Riot (5:05); 8. Leary vs. The Wolfman (5:01)
2012	Civil Disobedience for Losers (LP): Release date: October 30, 2012; Label: Sargent House	All songs written by Brandyn James Aikins and Daniel Brandon Allen: 1. Bruce Lee (4:30); 2. Red Action (3:09); 3. Starcraft (4:39); 4. Zombies (3:15); 5. Worm in My Stomach (3:05); 6. Terminal Horse (1:44); 7. Coming Home (3:29); 8. Centauri Teenage Riot (4:00); 9. Truck Mouth (3:41); 10. The Jerk (3:25); 11. Lion at the Door (3:28)
2015	Creeps (LP): Release date: October 2, 2015; Label: Sargent House	All songs written by Brandyn James Aikins and Daniel Brandon Allen: 1. Down at the Docks (4:19); 2. It's Late Queeny (3:05); 3. Murderers for Hire (3:08); 4. Brothers Underground (4:05); 5. Maelstrom (7:14); 6. Snake Mountain (4:06); 7. The Divider (6:29); 8. Degenerate Case (2:55); 9. Rat Faced Snorter (7:43)
2022	Empress in Decline (LP): Release date: July 22, 2022; Label: SilverDoor Music	All songs written by Brandyn James Aikins, Daniel Brandon Allen, and Leland Burmania: 1. Bait and Switch (4:03); 2. Criminal (2:46); 3. Crisis Breeder (4:40); 4. Empress in Decline (4:03); 5. New Death Therapy (2:45); 6. Feral Cats (2:54); 7. Coke Logic (1:18); 8. Bad Mood Lighting (3:15); 9. Petulant Twiggy (4:17)

=== EPs ===
Year	Album details	Track listing
2018	Bastard (EP): Release date: May 11, 2018; Label: Atrial Records	All songs written by Brandyn James Aikins, Daniel Brandon Allen, and Leland Burmania: 1. Reborn (14:00); 2. Deformed (14:00)

=== Split albums ===
Year	Album details	Track listing
2014	Swamp Child / One for You (7-inch Split): Release date: January 2014; Label: Scion Audio/Visual	Song written by Brandyn James Aikins, Daniel Brandon Allen, and King Buzzo.: 1. Swamp Child (4:07)

== See also ==
- Stoner rock
- King Buzzo
- List of bands from Canada
- Canadian rock
- Music of Ontario
