= KRAI-FM =

- Craig, Colorado; United States
- Frequency: 93.7 MHz

Programming
- Format: Hot AC

Ownership
- Owner: Don Tlapek; (Blizzard Broadcasting, LLC)
- Sister stations: KRAI

History
- Former call signs: KXRC (1981–1981)

Technical information
- Licensing authority: FCC
- Facility ID: 72437
- Class: C1
- ERP: 100,000 watts
- HAAT: 299.0 meters (981.0 ft)
- Transmitter coordinates: 40°34′35.00″N 107°36′29.00″W

Links
- Public license information: Public file; LMS
- Website: www.krai.com

KRAI-FM (93.7 FM) is a radio station licensed to Craig, Colorado, United States. The station is currently owned by Don Tlapek, through licensee Blizzard Broadcasting, LLC.

== History ==
The station was assigned the call letters KRAI-FM on 1981-06-24. On 1981-11-26, the station changed its call sign to KXRC, and on 1984-05-01 to the current KRAI-FM.

== FM Translator ==
KRAI-FM programming is also carried on an FM translator, which broadcasts on a frequency of 102.3 MHz. The effective radiated power is horizontal polarization only, according to the FCC database.

Call sign	Frequency	City of license	FID	ERP (W)	HAAT	Class	FCC info
K272DE	102.3 FM	Steamboat Springs, Colorado	72438	52	152 m (499 ft)	D	LMS
