= Beach Day =

American rock band

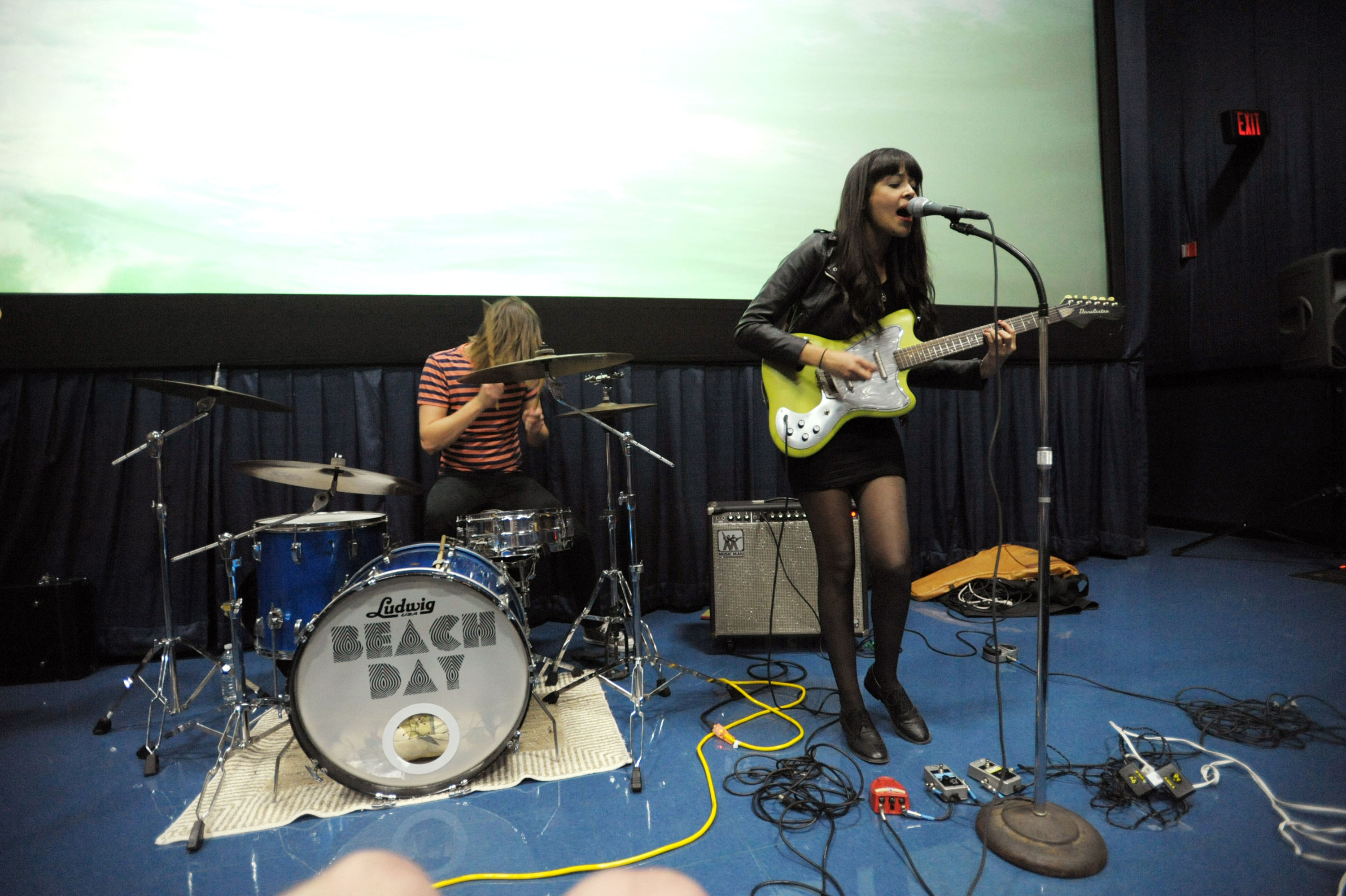
- Beach Day performing in 2014

Background information
- Origin: Hollywood, Florida, U.S.
- Genres: Surf rock, garage, pop
- Years active: 2012–present
- Labels: Kanine; Fastcut Records; Chocolate Covered Records
- Members: Kimmy Drake; Skyler Black; Connor Lawhorne
- Website: kaninerecords.com/beach-day

Beach Day are a rock band based in Hollywood, Florida. The duo consists of Kimmy Drake (guitars/vocals) and Skyler Black (drums). The duo met at a local show and bonded over their love of 60's girl groups and a common desire to be in a band that was purely about fun. Beach Day released their debut single, "Beach Day," in summer of 2012 and sophomore single "Walking on the Streets" in the fall. Their debut album, Trip Trap Attack, was released on June 18, 2013, by Kanine Records. It was recorded in South Florida and mixed in Detroit by Jim Diamond. Beach Day covered "Up on the Roof" for a LensCrafters television advertisement. They also did a cover of Screaming Lord Sutch's "Dracula's Daughter" in 2013 which was produced by Kramer. Their sophomore album "Native Echoes" was released on August 18, 2014, by Kanine Records. "Native Echoes" was produced, recorded and mixed with Jim Diamond in Detroit at Ghetto Recorders.

== Discography ==
=== Albums ===
- Native Echoes (2014)
- Trip Trap Attack (June 18, 2013)

=== Singles ===
- "Beach Day" (2012)
- "Walking on the Streets" (2012)
- "Dracula's Daughter" (2013)
- "Don't Call Me On The Phone" (2014)
- “I’m Just Messin’ Around” (2017)
- "Runaway With You" (2018)
- "If I Call Your Name" (2023)
- "Come On" (2024)
