= What Chaos Is Imaginary =

What Chaos is Imaginary

Studio album by Girlpool
- Released: February 1, 2019
- Length: 45:32
- Label: Anti-
- Producer: David Tolomei

Girlpool chronology
Powerplant (2017)	What Chaos is Imaginary (2019)	Forgiveness (2022)

What Chaos is Imaginary is the third studio album by American duo Girlpool. It was released on February 1, 2019, through Anti- Records.

== Release and promotion ==
On October 9, 2018, Girlpool released the double single "Lucy's" and "Where You Sink", their first release to feature Tucker singing much deeper than he did previously due to taking testosterone. On November 13, the band released the single "Hire", and announced What Chaos Is Imaginary. Girlpool toured the United States in April and May 2019 to promote the album.

== Critical reception ==
Professional ratings
Aggregate scores
Source	Rating
Metacritic	74/100
Review scores
Source	Rating
AllMusic	3/5 stars
Clash	7/10
Consequence	B+
DIY	3/5 stars
Drowned in Sound	8/10
Exclaim!	8/10
Paste	6.7/10
Pitchfork	7.8/10
Tiny Mix Tapes	3.5/5 marks
Under the Radar	6.5/10

What Chaos Is Imaginary received a weighted score of 74 out of 100 from review aggregate website Metacritic, indicating "generally favorable reviews", based on 19 reviews from music critics. Sasha Geffen of Pitchfork said, "Weaving in and out of concrete, direct, indie-rock songwriting and meditative, impressionistic dream pop, the record takes up more space than any of Girlpool’s previous music."

== Track listing ==
No.	Title	Length
1.	"Lucy's"	3:03
2.	"Stale Device"	3:10
3.	"Where You Sink"	3:22
4.	"Hire"	2:55
5.	"Pretty"	3:25
6.	"Chemical Freeze"	4:21
7.	"All Blacked Out"	3:07
8.	"Lucky Joke"	2:37
9.	"Minute in Your Mind"	2:21
10.	"What Chaos Is Imaginary"	5:23
11.	"Hoax and the Shrine"	2:37
12.	"Swamp and Bay"	3:12
13.	"Josephs Dad"	2:26
14.	"Roses"	3:33
Total length:		45:32

== Charts ==
Chart	Peak position
US Heatseekers Albums (Billboard)	16
US Independent Albums (Billboard)	40
