= Mandy, Indiana =

English noise rock band

- Origin: Manchester, England
- Genres: Noise rock; experimental rock; post-industrial
- Years active: 2016–present
- Labels: Fire Talk, Sacred Bones
- Members: Valentine Caulfield; Scott Fair; Simon Catling; Alex Macdougall
- Past members: Liam Stewart

Mandy, Indiana are an English–French noise rock band based between Manchester and Berlin, formed in 2018. The band's lineup consists of vocalist and lyricist Valentine Caulfield, guitarist and producer Scott Fair, synth player Simon Catling, and drummer Alex Macdougall.

Caulfield is from Paris and a native French speaker, and sings almost entirely in French. The band's name is derived from Gary, Indiana, changing the city name to "Mandy".

The band released their debut album, I've Seen a Way, in 2023 to positive reception. It was partially recorded in a cave in the West Country and in a nearby crypt. Their second studio album, Urgh, was released in February 2026 to widespread acclaim.

== Discography ==
Adapted from AllMusic Guide, Discogs, and MusicBrainz.

=== Studio album ===
- I've Seen a Way (2023)
- Urgh (2026)

=== EP ===
- ...EP (2021)

=== Singles ===
- "Nike of Samothrace" (2020)
- "Pashto" (2020)
- "Berlin" (2020)
- "Alien 3" (2021)
- "Bottle Episode" (2021)
- "Injury Detail" (2023)
- "Magazine" (2025)
