= KRAI (AM) =

Radio station in Craig, Colorado

- Craig, Colorado; United States
- Frequency: 550 kHz
- Branding: 55 Country

Programming
- Format: Country

Ownership
- Owner: Don Tlapek; (Blizzard Broadcasting, LLC)
- Sister stations: KRAI-FM

Technical information
- Licensing authority: FCC
- Facility ID: 72436
- Class: B
- Power: 5,000 watts day 500 watts night
- Transmitter coordinates: 40°32′45″N 107°31′52″W
- Translators: K286CV (105.1 MHz, Craig)

Links
- Public license information: Public file; LMS
- Website: www.krai.com

KRAI (550 AM) is a radio station broadcasting a country music format. Licensed to Craig, Colorado, the station is currently owned by Don Tlapek, through licensee Blizzard Broadcasting, LLC The radio station was founded by George Oliver Cory.

== History ==
KRAI went on the air in 1948 at 1230 kHz. Broadcasting with 250 watts, KRAI was owned by Newel S. Cahoon's Craig Broadcasting Company; the Northwestern Colorado Broadcasting Company acquired it in 1949, and George Oliver Cory consolidated his ownership in 1951. In 1955, KRAI was approved to move to 550 at 1,000 watts day and 500 night; it increased its daytime power to the present 5,000 watts in 1968.
