= Feeble Little Horse =

American indie rock band

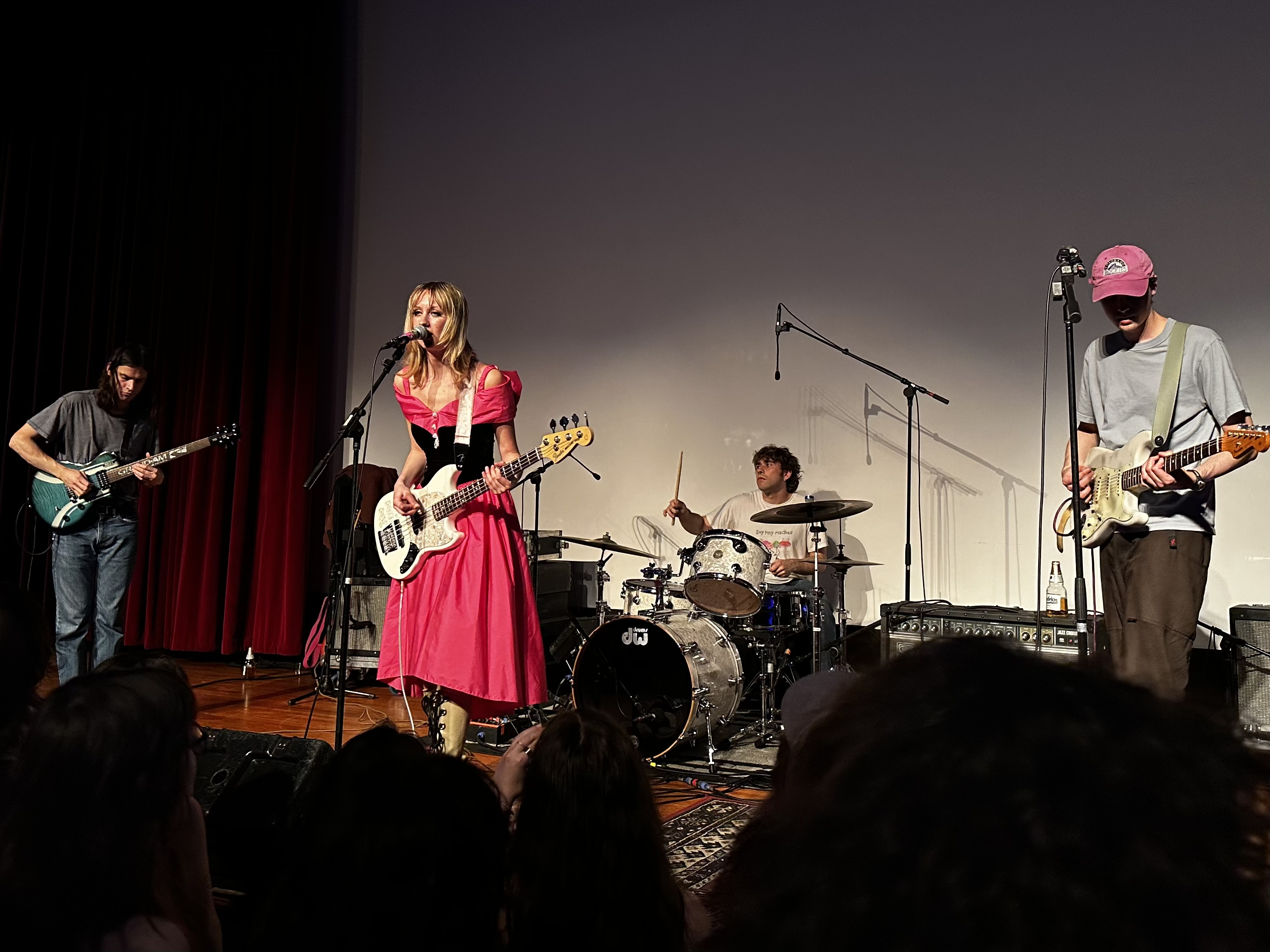
- Feeble Little Horse performing at the University of Massachusetts Amherst auditorium in 2025

Background information
- Origin: Pittsburgh, Pennsylvania, U.S.
- Genres: Indie rock; noise pop; shoegaze; slacker rock
- Years active: 2021–present
- Labels: Julia's War; Saddle Creek
- Members: Sebastian Kinsler; Jake Kelley; Lydia Slocum
- Past members: Ryan Walchonski

feeble little horse (styled in all lowercase) is an American indie rock band from Pittsburgh, Pennsylvania, that formed in 2021. It currently comprises three founding members: multi-instrumentalist Sebastian Kinsler, drummer Jake Kelley, and vocalist-bassist Lydia Slocum. Guitarist Ryan Walchonski was also a founding member but left the group in 2025. The band is currently signed to Saddle Creek Records; they have three albums and one EP.

== History ==
Feeble Little Horse was formed in early 2021 by guitarists Sebastian Kinsler and Ryan Walchonski, who first played together in a short-lived garage rock band. The duo enlisted the help of drummer Jake Kelley to release a debut project. Feeble little horse's first EP, modern tourism, was released in May 2021. The band expanded to include singer and bassist Lydia Slocum, who had previously collaborated with Kinsler under the name Kiddie since early 2021.

Feeble Little Horse released their debut full-length album, Hayday, through Philadelphia label Julia's War Recordings in October 2021. The group signed to Saddle Creek Records in October 2022, and re-released Hayday both through the label and their Unstable Collective imprint, expanding the tracklist to include a bonus track, "Dog Song 2," and a remix of Hayday track "Termites" by the Philadelphia-based shoegaze band Full Body 2. The album's second single, "Chores," received praise from the New York Times and Pitchfork upon rerelease.

On February 27, 2023, Feeble Little Horse announced their second album with Saddle Creek, Girl with Fish, and issued the album's first single, "Tin Man." The single was followed by a second track, "Steamroller," on April 4, 2023, and a third track, "Pocket," on May 10, 2023. The album was released on June 9, 2023. A three-week tour of the album across the United States was cancelled on June 22, 2023, three days before it was set to commence. In a message on Instagram, the band stated they would "have to take a step back and reassess [their] little world for [their] continued health."

The band officially returned from their live hiatus on January 16, 2024, when they announced an appearance at the 2024 Coachella festival. They played their first official public live show back in Ames, Iowa on February 17, 2024.

On March 11, 2025, Feeble Little Horse released their first new song since 2023's Girl With Fish, a single titled "This Is Real".

On May 21, 2026, Feeble Little Horse announced their third album, Bitknot, would be released on the following Tuesday, May 26.

== Discography ==
=== Studio albums ===
- Hayday (2021, reissued 2022)
- Girl with Fish (2023)
- Bitknot (2026)

=== EPs ===
- Modern Tourism (2021)

=== Singles ===
- "This Is Real" (2025)
