= Olga Bell =

American-Russian musician (born 1983)

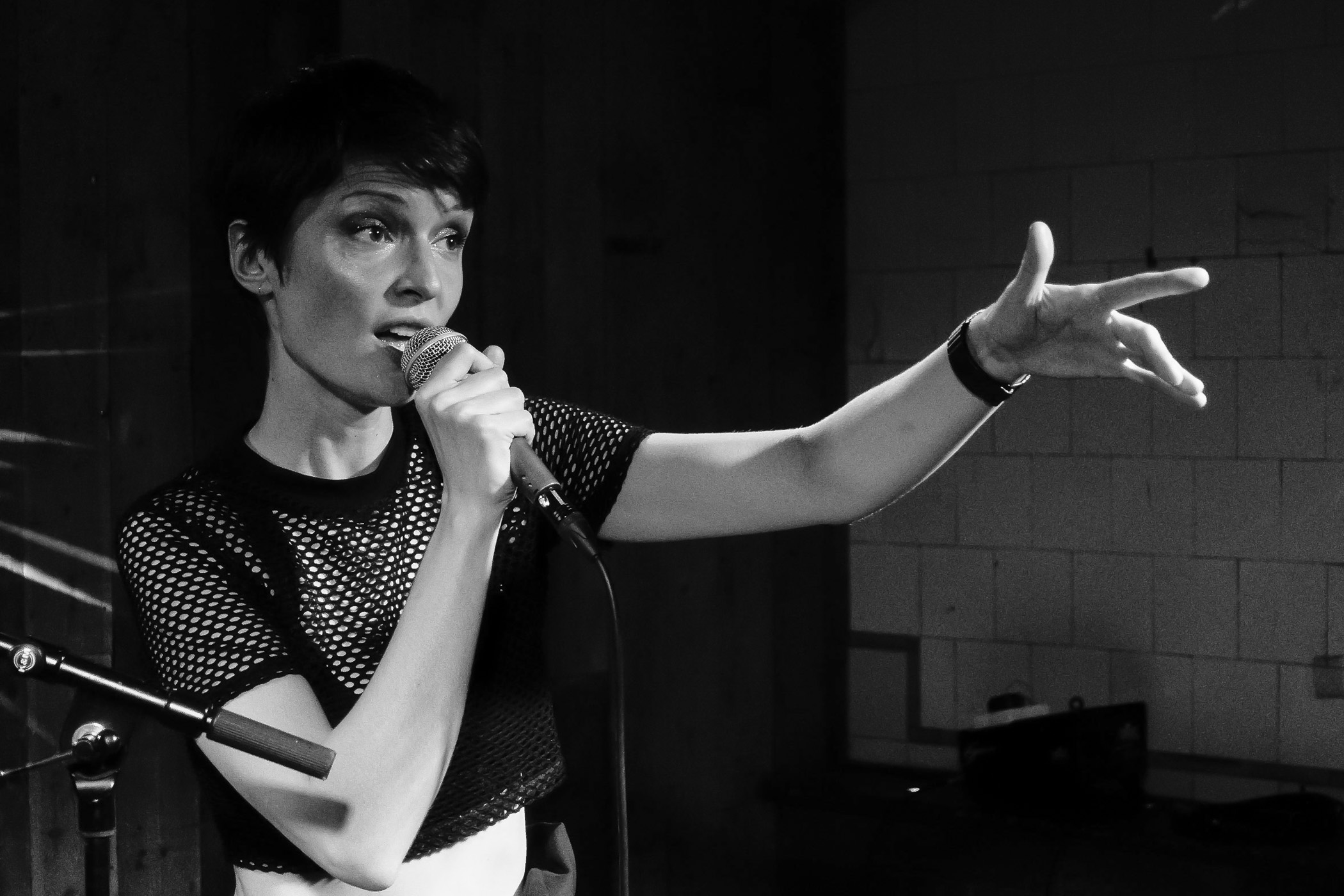
- Bell performing in 2016

Background information
- Born: Olga Balashova; 3 October 1983 (age 42); Moscow, Russian SFSR, USSR
- Origin: Anchorage, Alaska, U.S.
- Genres: Electronic; classical
- Occupations: Singer; songwriter; producer; composer; remixer; video director
- Instruments: Vocals; synthesizer; piano
- Years active: 2007–present
- Labels: One Little Independent; New Amsterdam
- Member of: Dirty Projectors
- Formerly of: BELL; Nothankyou
- Website: bellinspace.com

Olga Bell (born Olga Balashova, Russian: Ольга Балашова, 3 October 1983) is an American-Russian musician, music producer, composer, and singer-songwriter. She was born in Moscow, Russia, and raised in Anchorage, Alaska. A classically trained pianist, she has worked in a variety of musical genres, ranging from classical to electropop. She has released the 2011 album Diamonite (under the moniker BELL) as well as Krai (2014) and Tempo (2016). She is also a member of the rock band Dirty Projectors, and she has collaborated with Tom Vek under the name Nothankyou.

== Early life ==
Bell started playing the piano at age seven, after moving with her mother from Moscow to Anchorage, and she made her public debut two years later. She studied under Svetlana Velichko, a former Moscow Conservatory professor and Samuel Feinberg student, and at age 12, she began performing with the Anchorage Civic Orchestra. In high school, she attended the Aspen Music Festival and School on a scholarship. She has been a fellow of The Banff Centre in Alberta, Canada, and Yale's Norfolk Chamber Music Festival.

== Career ==
=== 2005–13: Beginnings and Diamonite ===
In August 2005, having graduated from the New England Conservatory but not been accepted to the Juilliard School's graduate program, Bell moved to New York City to pursue music outside the classical realm. She bought a laptop and started recording herself, singing into the built-in microphone and creating beats. From 2005 to 2010, she split her time between piano teaching and theater accompaniment gigs and pursuing her new musical project.

During this time, she performed at open mics and formed the band BELL with Jason Nazary, Mike Chiavaro, and Grey McMurray. In 2007, they self-produced and self-released the six-song EP Bell. In 2011, with Chiavaro and McMurray having left the band, Bell worked with Nazary and Gunnar Olsen to produce and release her first full-length album, Diamonite.

Diamonite received positive critical review, with The New York Times praising its "bubbly, glitchy electronic pop songs", driven by Bell's "powerful" voice. Consequence of Sound remarked that "while moments on Diamonite might recall other artists, the band never sounds imitative or even descendant of those influences".

Aside from her work on her own music, Bell produced remixes of tracks by Chairlift, Son Lux, Phoenix, Caroline Shaw, and others. In 2009 she was selected by composer Osvaldo Golijov and soprano Dawn Upshaw for a workshop and concert at Carnegie Hall.

=== 2013-15: Krai and Nothankyou ===
In 2011, Bell received the Jerome Fund Grant from the American Composers Forum to aid in the completion of her second album, Krai, which was released to critical acclaim in 2014, following a sold-out live premiere at the Walker Art Center in Minneapolis. The Daily Telegraph called it "fresh and new".

Bell also pursued the side project Nothankyou, with the British musician Tom Vek, releasing three dance tracks between 2012 and 2014, through Moshi Moshi Records and independently on SoundCloud. In 2013, she directed a video for their single "Oyster".

From 2011 to 2013, Bell toured as a member of the rock band Dirty Projectors, playing keyboardist and singing. She returned to the group in 2017 and has been a member again since 2024.

=== 2015-present: Incitation and Tempo ===
In mid-2015, Bell toured with Son Lux and premiered live versions of songs from Incitation, an EP she released on One Little Independent Records later that year, and Tempo, a full-length album that came out the following year.

In August 2015, Nowness premiered the video for "Goalie", the last track on Incitation, which Bell co-directed with Christina Ladwig. Bell also worked with Noah Kalina to produce a lyric video for the EP's title track. Pitchfork compared Incitation to works by FKA Twigs and Björk, saying it "has an economy of purpose and more serious bent than her previous electronic work" and praising its "melismatic melodies and damaged electronic architecture", while also lamenting that it "hints in plenty of promising directions but hesitates from going all the way toward them".

In March 2016, Bell released "Randomness", which Pitchfork named Best New Track. On her third full-length album, Tempo, Bell explored dance music genres in order to create a record "first for the body, then for the mind". The Quietus said it "takes the recognisable features of a genre and subverts them, playing on our conceptions of musical familiarity and never letting the audience grow complacent".

Also in 2016, Bell toured the U.S. and Europe in support of Chairlift, Empress Of, and Yeasayer.

== Discography ==
=== Studio albums ===
- Diamonite (as BELL) (2011)
- Krai (2014)
- Tempo (2016)

=== EPs ===
- Bell (as BELL) (2007)
- Incitation (2015)
- America (2017)

=== Singles ===
- "Magic Tape" (as BELL) (2009)
- "Dialtone" (as BELL) (2012)
- "Know Yourself / Oyster" (with Tom Vek as Nothankyou) (2013)
- "Goalie" (2015)
- "Incitation" (2015)
- "Randomness" (2016)
- "ATA" (2016)
- "Levitating" (2017)
