= Girlpool =

Indie band from Los Angeles, California

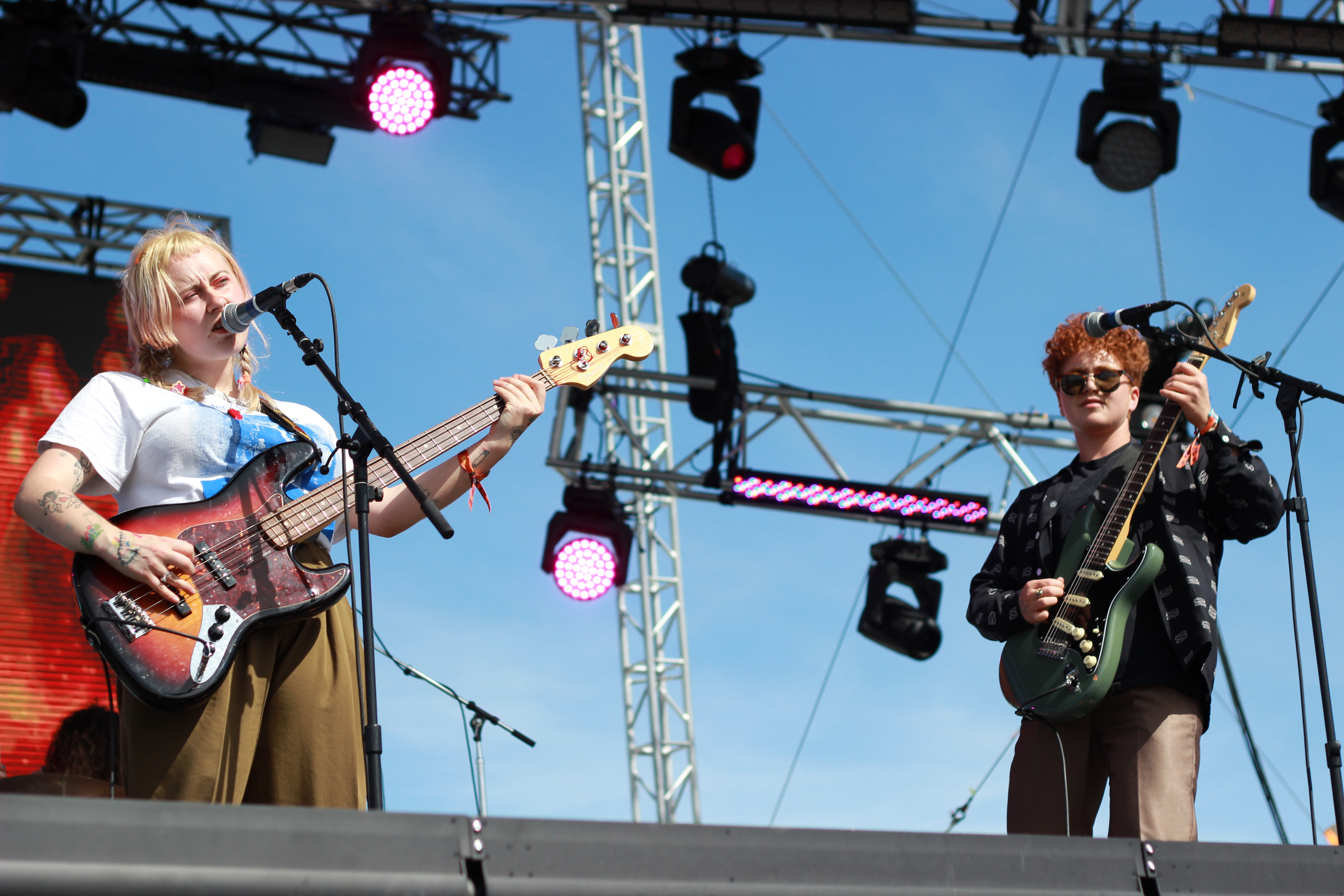
- Girlpool at Sasquatch! Music Festival in May 2018

Background information
- Origin: Los Angeles, California
- Genres: Indie rock; indie pop; dream pop; lo-fi
- Years active: 2013–2022
- Labels: Anti-, Wichita Recordings
- Past members: Avery Tucker; Harmony Tividad

Girlpool was an indie rock band from Los Angeles, California, formed by friends Avery Tucker and Harmony Tividad. Their debut self-titled EP Girlpool was released on Bandcamp in 2014 and re-released on Wichita Recordings later that year. They released their debut album Before the World Was Big in 2015, followed by Powerplant (2017) and What Chaos Is Imaginary (2019). Their fourth and final studio album, Forgiveness (2022), was released on April 29. In August 2022, the duo announced that they will be taking an indefinite break from the band.

== Background ==
=== 2013-2018: Girlpool, Before the World Was Big, and Powerplant ===
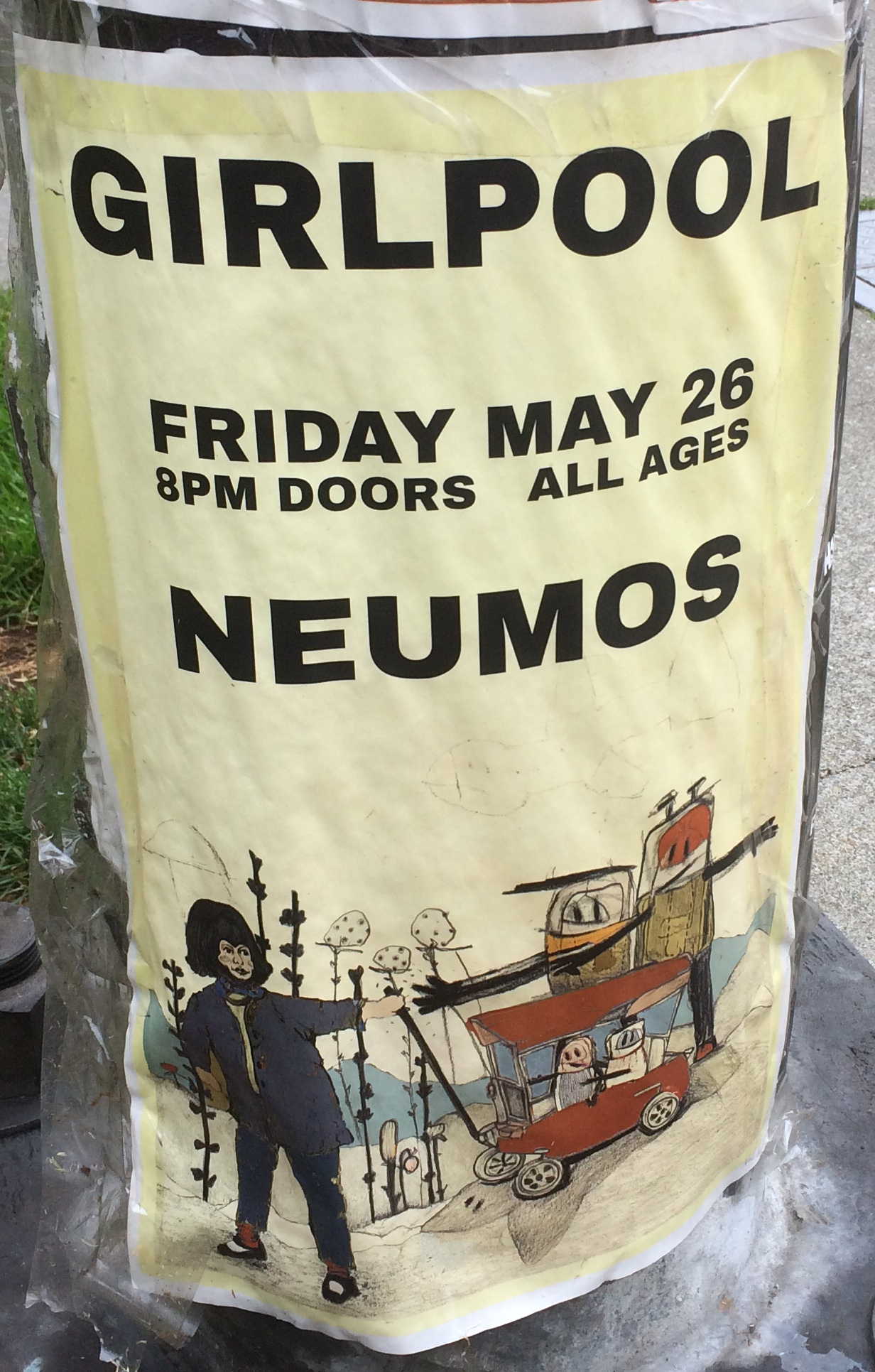
2017 tour flyer with the same art as Powerplant

Girlpool was formed in 2013 by friends Avery Tucker and Harmony Tividad. Their self-titled debut EP "Girlpool" was released on Bandcamp in February 2014, and re-released on Wichita Recordings later that year. The EP received generally favorable reviews from critics, with a weighted average score of 79 on Metacritic. In his review of this EP, Chris Conaton compared their sound to "an angrier, socially conscious Kimya Dawson."

On June 2, 2015, Girlpool released their debut album, Before the World Was Big, also on Wichita Recordings. It also received generally favorable reviews from critics, with a 79 out of 100 score on Metacritic. Pitchfork's Jayson Greene gave it a score of 7.8 out of 10 and described it as "a quiet album of uncommon intensity."

In March 2017, Girlpool announced they had signed to Anti- Records, along with their second studio album and a United States tour. On May 12, 2017, the band released their second studio album, Powerplant, via Anti-. The album received an 8.3 by Jillian Mapes on Pitchfork. Mapes described their new sounds as "echoing second-wave emo sourness ("Your Heart"), Britpop jangle ("She Goes By"), and classic alt-rock loud-quiet-loudness throughout". In Summer 2017, Avery Tucker came out as a trans man.

On February 1, 2018, Girlpool released "Picturesong" featuring Dev Hynes. The band said about the song, "Picturesong is a word invented to explore what we create in each other when we want to feel deep love because of loneliness or otherwise, and brings into question the reality and delusion of the things we feel," Hynes said about making a song with Tucker and Tividad, "I’m such a fan of Girlpool, and loved working with them. Their harmonies are some of my favourites that are out there." The song was initially released on SoundCloud, then on other streaming services a week later.

=== 2018-2021: What Chaos Is Imaginary ===
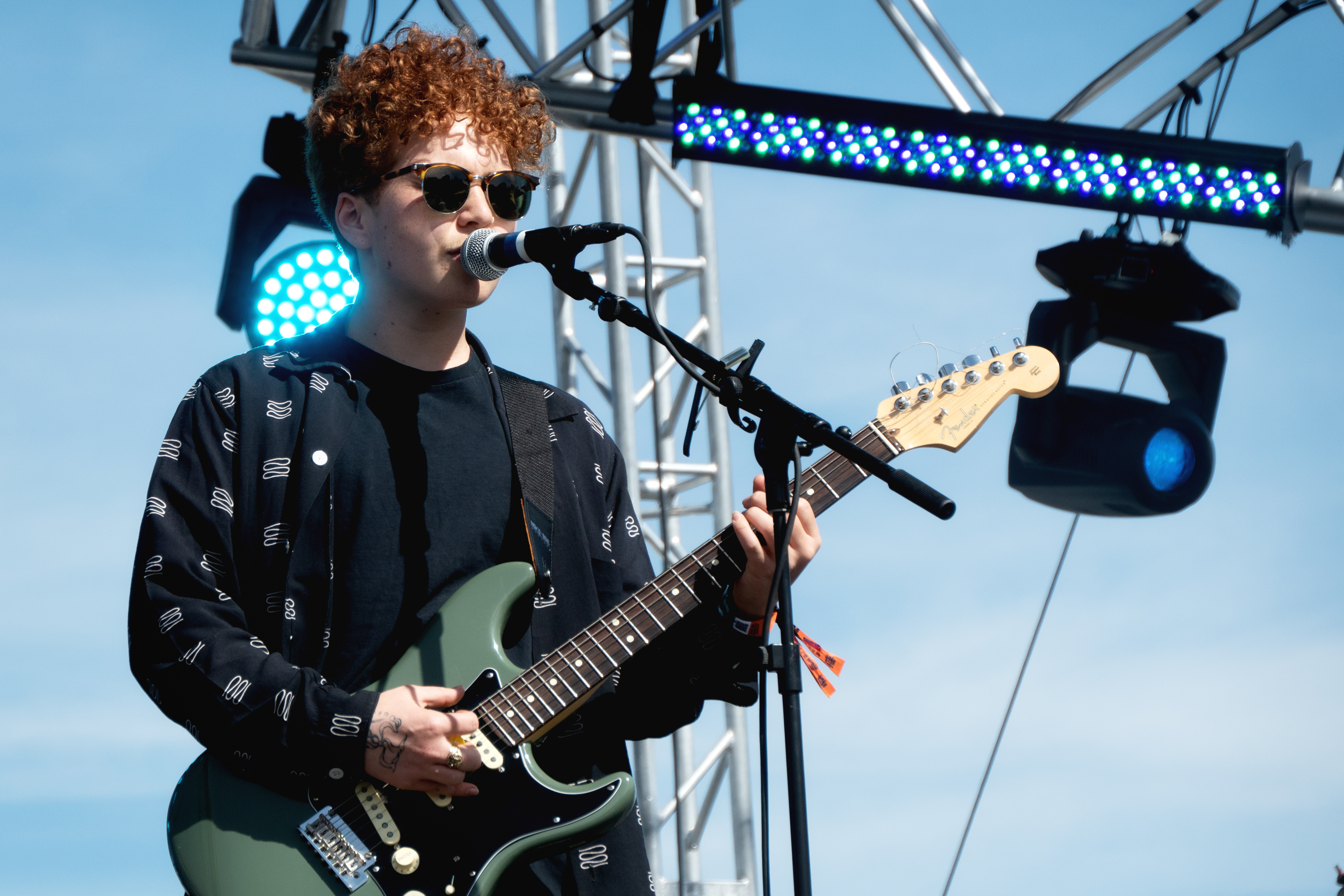
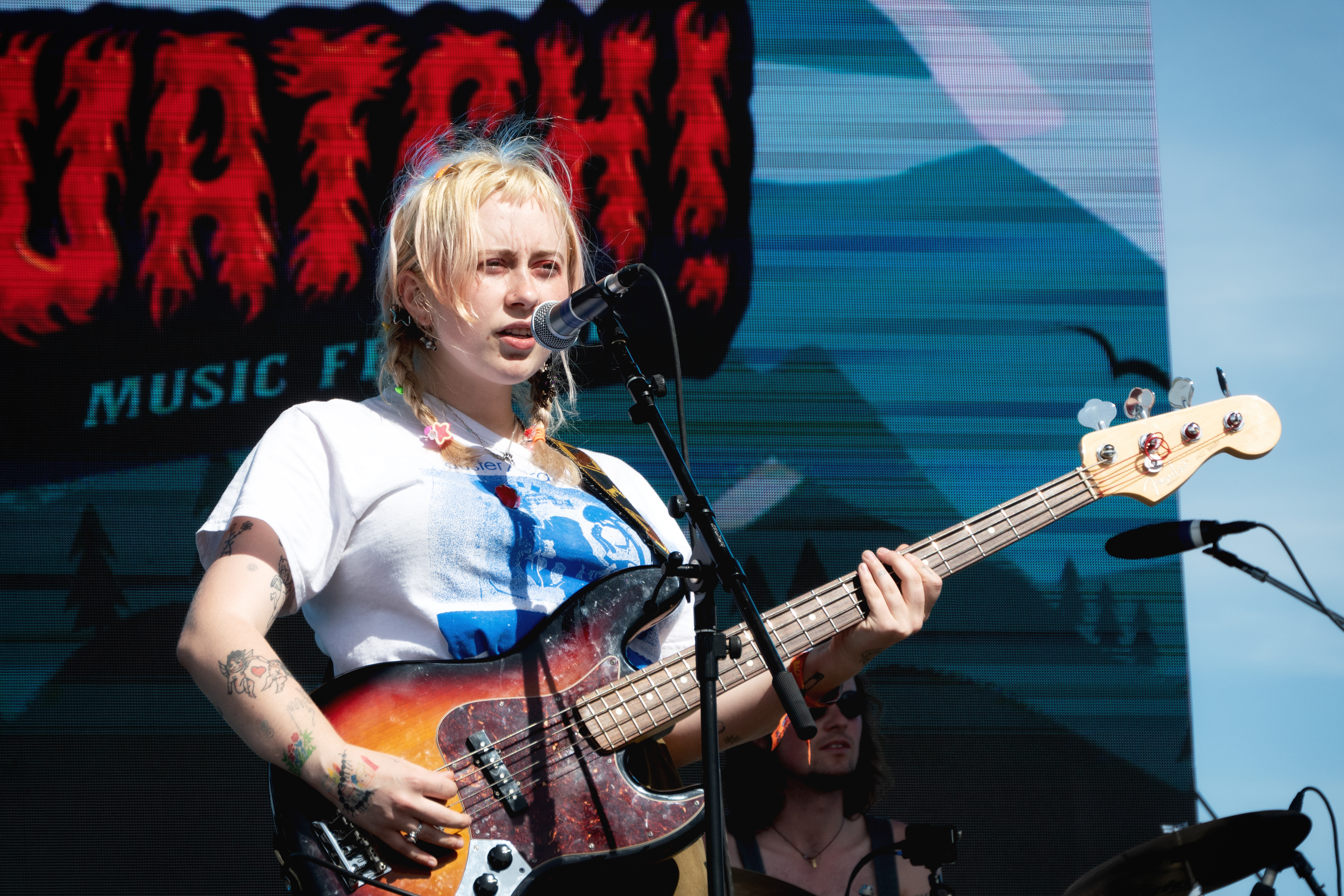
Avery Tucker (top) and Harmony Tividad (bottom) in 2018

On October 9, 2018, the band released the singles "Lucy's" and "Where You Sink", their first release to feature Tucker singing much deeper than he did previously. On November 13, 2018, Girlpool released the single "Hire", and announced their third studio album. The album, titled What Chaos Is Imaginary, was released on February 1, 2019. It received generally favorable reviews, with an average score of 74 on Metacritic. Sasha Geffen of Pitchfork said about the album, "Weaving in and out of concrete, direct, indie-rock songwriting and meditative, impressionistic dream pop, the record takes up more space than any of Girlpool’s previous music."

On March 12, 2020, Girlpool released the single "Like I'm Winning It" and an accompanying music video. Tucker said about the song:

"‘Like I'm Winning It’ is about power and lust: How can the weight of someone’s attention feel so heavy just because of its scarcity? This is a song about playing with that line—the line between the electricity in receiving attention and what’s unattainable."

Shortly after the release of the single, Tucker and Tividad were forced to self-isolate due to the COVID-19 pandemic. On May 1, 2020, Girlpool released Chaos Demos, a collection of demos for songs from their previous studio album, on their Bandcamp. It included a write-up from Avery reflecting on making peace with who he used to be, and being a trans man in a band called Girlpool. On August 31, 2020, the band released a remix EP titled Touch Me (It's Like I'm Winning It) featuring new versions of "Like I'm Winning It" by Porches, Lydia Ainsworth, and previous collaborator Dev Hynes. In April 2021, Tividad appeared as a grocery store employee in the music video for "Posing in Bondage" by Japanese Breakfast. She also appeared as a dancer in the music video for "Slumber Party" by Ashnikko in May.

=== 2021–2022: Forgiveness and split ===
On December 8, 2021, Girlpool released the single "Faultline", alongside a self-directed video featuring Julian Klincewicz.

On January 19, 2022, Girlpool released the song "Lie Love Lullaby" along with a music video directed by Amalia Irons. The band also announced their fourth studio album Forgiveness, which released on April 29, 2022. On February 23, Girlpool released the single "Dragging My Life Into a Dream", alongside a self-directed video.

On August 25, Girlpool announced that they would breakup at the end of 2022, with their remaining tour dates serving as a farewell tour.

=== 2023–present: Solo work ===
On August 25, 2023, Tividad released her debut solo EP Dystopia Girl under the mononymous name Harmony. Harmony's debut album, Gossip, was released on October 11, 2024. Tucker's debut album, Paw, was released on October 10, 2025.

== Musical style and influences ==
According to Timothy Monger of AllMusic: "The band grew from a sparse drummerless duo on their earliest albums into something resembling a more traditional indie rock act on subsequent records like 2019's What Chaos Is Imaginary, borrowing angst from '90s alternative guitar heroes and lush arrangements and bright harmonies from classic radio pop. They tipped the balance toward a glossier, more spacious keyboard pop by their fourth album, 2022's Forgiveness, which looked candidly at twentysomething relationship disappointments." The Fader's Shaad D'Souza said that "Los Angeles duo Girlpool write songs about change, and the things we gain or leave behind when moving from one part of life to another." Music critic Robert Christgau characterized the band's lyrics as "picking their way through a world that ain’t all that big no matter how scary."

Tividad has cited alternative rock bands such as Cocteau Twins and Siouxsie and the Banshees as influences, as well as 2010s solo acts such as Charli XCX and Tyler, the Creator. The band is also often compared to The Shaggs, a band notable for their perceived ineptitude at playing conventional rock music. In an article about the Shaggs, Matt McMahon from The Observer states: "The band most inspiring this spiritual connection [to The Shaggs] is Girlpool, a stripped back punk duo with a penchant for raw instrumentation and emotive harmonies".

== Band members ==
Former members

- Avery Tucker – guitar, bass guitar, vocals (2013–2022)
- Harmony Tividad – bass guitar, guitar, vocals (2013–2022)

Former touring members

- Miles Wintner – drums (2017)
- Stephen Steinbrink – guitar (2017)
- Kevin Boog – guitar (2018)
- Patrick Nolan – guitar, bass (2017–2022)
- Sariah Mae – keyboards (2017–2022)
- Ross Chait – drums (2017–2022)

== Discography ==
=== Albums ===
==== Studio albums ====
- Before the World Was Big (June 2, 2015, Wichita Recordings)
- Powerplant (May 12, 2017, Anti-)
- What Chaos Is Imaginary (February 1, 2019, Anti-)
- Forgiveness (April 29, 2022, Anti-)

==== Demo albums ====
- Chaos Demos (May 1, 2020, Self-released)

=== EPs ===
- Girlpool (November 2014, Wichita Recordings)
- Touch Me (It's Like I'm Winning It) (August 2020, Anti-)

=== Singles ===
- "Chinatown" (2015, Wichita Recordings)
- "Picturesong" (2018, Anti-)
- "Lucy's" (2018, Anti-)
- "Where You Sink" (2018, Anti-)
- "Hire" (2018, Anti-)
- "Like I'm Winning It" (2020, Anti-)
- "Faultline" (2021, Anti-)
- "Lie Love Lullaby" (2022, Anti-)
- "Dragging My Life Into a Dream" (2022, Anti-)
