= Long Beard =

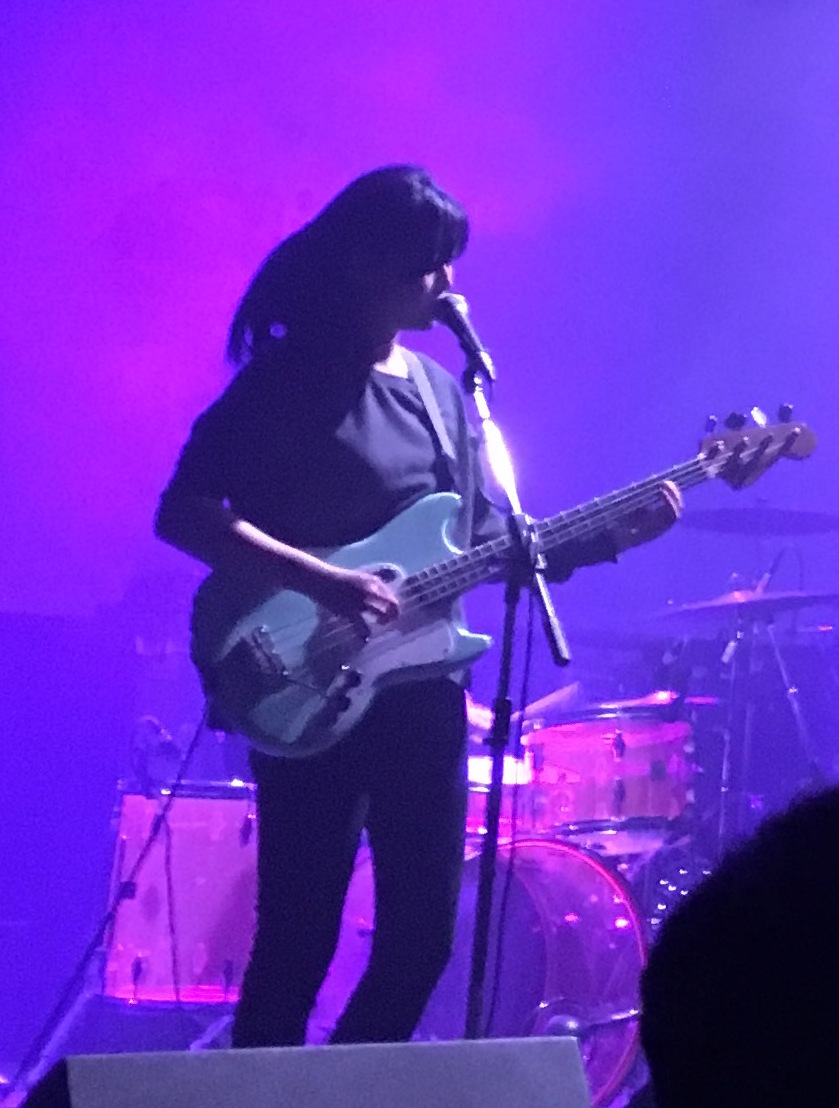
- Bear playing with Japanese Breakfast in 2017

Background information
- Born: Leslie Bear; 23 October 1990 (age 35)
- Origin: New Brunswick, New Jersey, U.S.
- Genres: Indie rock, dream pop
- Instruments: Vocals, guitar, bass
- Years active: 2009–present
- Labels: Double Double Whammy, Team Love
- Website: long-beard.bandcamp.com

Leslie Bear (born 23 October 1990), professionally known as Long Beard, is an American musician from East Brunswick, New Jersey. She released her debut studio album, Sleepwalker, in 2015. Her second studio album, Means to Me, was released in 2019.

== Life and career ==
Leslie Bear was born on 23 October 1990 and was raised in East Brunswick, New Jersey. Growing up, Bear listened to '90s Cantopop and Mandopop musicians such as Faye Wong, singing along and playing melodies on a keyboard. Her mother offered to hire a piano teacher. At fifteen, she borrowed a friend's Squier Stratocaster, bought an Ibanez guitar, and began learning the instrument. Bear began performing after finding that the music scene in the neighboring city of New Brunswick supported local acts. She began using the moniker Long Beard, after a fictional wizard she had created. She graduated from Rutgers University with a degree in computer science and temporarily worked as a software developer before deciding to pursue music full-time.

In 2014, Bear released her debut extended play, Holy Crow. She released the EP due to a desire to put herself "'out there.'"

== Discography ==
=== Studio albums ===
Long Beard discography
- Studio albums: 2
- EPs: 1

List of studio albums
Title	Details
Sleepwalker	Released: 23 October 2015; Label: Team Love Records; Format: Streaming, digital download, cassette
Means to Me	Released: 13 September 2019; Label: Double Double Whammy; Format: Streaming, digital download, LP

=== Extended plays ===
List of extended plays
Title	Details
Holy Crow	Released 2 March 2014; Label: Self-released; Format: Streaming, digital download, cassette
