= Guardian Alien =

US music project by Greg Fox

- Origin: Brooklyn, New York
- Genres: Psychedelic rock, noise rock, experimental rock, avant-garde
- Years active: 2010–present
- Labels: Thrill Jockey, Infinite Limbs, Swill Children, Animal Image Search
- Members: Alex Drewchin Jr.
- Past members: Camilla Padgit-Coles; Justin Frye; Mario Maggio; Turner Williams Jr. Eli Winograd; Bernard Gann; Ashiq Khondker
- Website: www.guardianalien.tumblr.com

Guardian Alien is a music project started by drummer Greg Fox. There have been many collaborators since the project's inception in 2010, and it is currently the duo of Fox and Alexandra Drewchin.

== Background ==
Guardian Alien was formed in 2010 by Greg Fox, former drummer of Teeth Mountain, Dan Deacon, the black metal band Liturgy, and others. They played several shows throughout 2010 and 2011 in Brooklyn, New York and released their self-titled debut album exclusively on vinyl during the same year. Their second album, See the World Given to a One Love Entity, was released on July 24, 2012. It is a 37-minute instrumental one track album. The iTunes version contains a bonus track.

== Collaborators ==
- Greg Fox – Drums, Gong, Kargyraa, Electronics, Arrangement
- Alex Drewchin Jr. – Vocals, Electronics

== Discography ==
- Guardian Alien (2011)
- See the World Given to a One Love Entity (2012)
- Spiritual Emergency (2014)
- Elf in μ (2014)
