= Upchuck (band) =

American punk rock band

- Origin: Atlanta, Georgia, United States
- Genres: Punk rock, garage rock
- Years active: 2018–present
- Labels: Famous Class, Domino, Suicide Squeeze Records
- Members: Kaila "KT" Thompson; Michael "Mikey" Durham; Hoff; Ausar Ward; Chris Salado
- Website: upchuckatlanta.com

Upchuck is an American punk rock band from Atlanta, Georgia, formed in 2018.They are noted for their energetic live performances and politically charged lyrics.

The group consists of vocalist Kaila "KT" Thompson, guitarists Michael "Mikey" Durham, Hoff, bassist Ausar Ward, and drummer Chris Salado.

Upchuck released their first EP "Upchuck" in January 2020, Then released their debut album Sense Yourself on Famous Class Records in 2022, followed by Bite the Hand That Feeds in 2023. In 2024, the band signed with Domino Recording Company to release their third album, I'm Nice Now.

== History ==
Upchuck formed in 2018 in Atlanta, Georgia, when Hoff, Durham, Ward, and Salado began playing together in the city's skateboarding and DIY punk scene. Hoff later recalled that he and Durham "had been jamming together since pre-Upchuck days, and developed the group's shared musical instincts together." They soon recruited vocalist Kaila "KT" Thompson, who joined as the final member of the original lineup. The group established themselves through performances at house shows, skate parks, and small venues around Atlanta.

By 2019, Upchuck had built a local following, performing at Atlanta venues and appearing on festival lineups such as Afropunk.

Their debut album, Sense Yourself, was released on September 30, 2022, by Famous Class Records.

Upchuck's second album, Bite the Hand That Feeds, was released in October 2023 through Famous Class Records. The album was produced by Ty Segall, who invited the band to record at his Harmonizer Studio in Los Angeles after discovering them through their debut.

On October 3, 2025, Upchuck released their third studio album, I'm Nice Now, through Domino Recording Company. The record was also produced and mixed by Ty Segall at Sonic Ranch Studio in Texas and mastered by Heba Kadry.

== Discography ==
=== Albums ===
- Sense Yourself (2022)
- Bite the Hand That Feeds (2023)
- I'm Nice Now (2025)
