= Powerplant (album) =

2017 studio album by Girlpool

Studio album by Girlpool
- Released: May 12, 2017
- Studios: Comp-ny (Los Angeles, CA)
- Genres: Alternative rock; grunge; lo-fi; noise
- Length: 28:29
- Label: Anti-

Girlpool chronology
Before the World Was Big (2015)	Powerplant (2017)	What Chaos Is Imaginary (2019)

Powerplant is the second studio album by American band Girlpool. It was released on May 12, 2017, through Anti-.

== Composition ==
The songs on Powerplant have been seen as "blink-and-you'll-miss-em grunge lullabies", as well as having the "loud-quiet-loudness" of alternative rock throughout. The employment of lo-fi and noise has also been seen in its music, like the distortion used in "Soup".

== Critical reception ==
Professional ratings
Aggregate scores
Source	Rating
Metacritic	80/100
Review scores
Source	Rating
AllMusic	3.5/5 stars
The A.V. Club	B−
Consequence	B+
DIY	3/5 stars
Drowned in Sound	8/10
Exclaim!	8/10
The Guardian	4/5 stars
Pitchfork	8.3/10
The Skinny	5/5 stars
Under the Radar	7.5/10

Powerplant was welcomed with critical applause upon its release. On Metacritic, it has a score of 80 out of 100, indicating "generally favorable reviews", based on 14 reviews.

== Accolades ==
Publication	Accolade	Rank	Ref.
Esquire	Top 20 Albums of 2017	13	
Pitchfork	Top 20 Rock Albums of 2017	11	
Thrillist	Top 40 Albums of 2017	33	
Uproxx	Top 20 Rock Albums of 2017	6	

== Track listing ==
No.	Title	Length
1.	"123"	2:50
2.	"Sleepless"	2:27
3.	"Corner Store"	1:31
4.	"Your Heart"	2:47
5.	"Kiss and Burn"	2:08
6.	"Fast Dust"	2:01
7.	"Powerplant"	2:21
8.	"High Rise"	1:15
9.	"Soup"	2:01
10.	"She Goes By"	2:04
11.	"It Gets More Blue"	3:26
12.	"Static Somewhere"	3:38
Total length:		28:29

== Personnel ==
Girlpool

- Avery Tucker - leading vocals, guitar
- Harmony Tividad - leading vocals, bass guitar
- Miles Wintner - drums

Technical

- Drew Fischer - engineer
- Heba Kadry - mastering

Artwork and design

- Jaxon Demme - artwork
