= Eternal Tapestry =

American psychedelic rock and space rock band

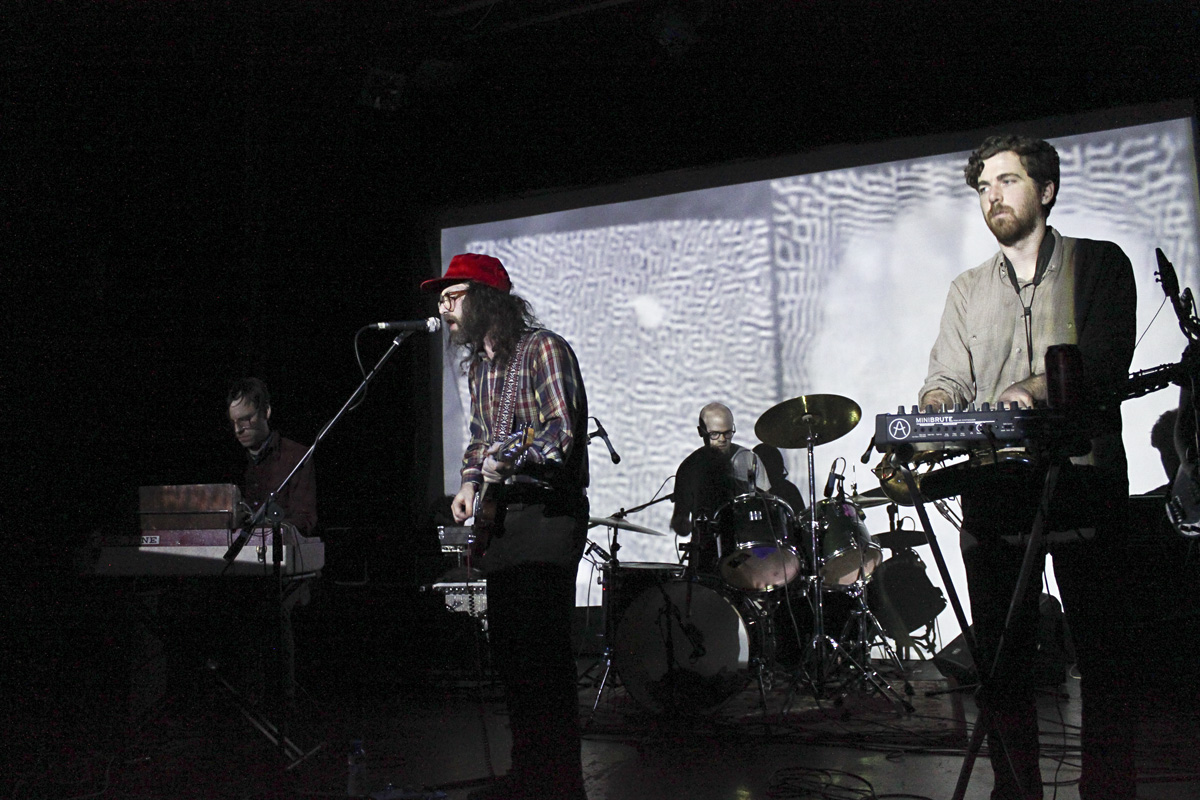
- Eternal Tapestry in 2013

Background information
- Origin: Portland, Oregon, US
- Genres: Psychedelic rock, space rock
- Years active: 2005–2015
- Labels: Solar Commune; Not Not Fun Records; U-Sound Archive; Three Lobed Recordings; Thrill Jockey; KDVS Recordings; Oaken Palace Records; Sky Lantern Records
- Past members: Bob Jones; Dewey Mahood; Jed Bindeman; Krag Likins; Nick Bindeman; Ryan Carlile; Warren Lee

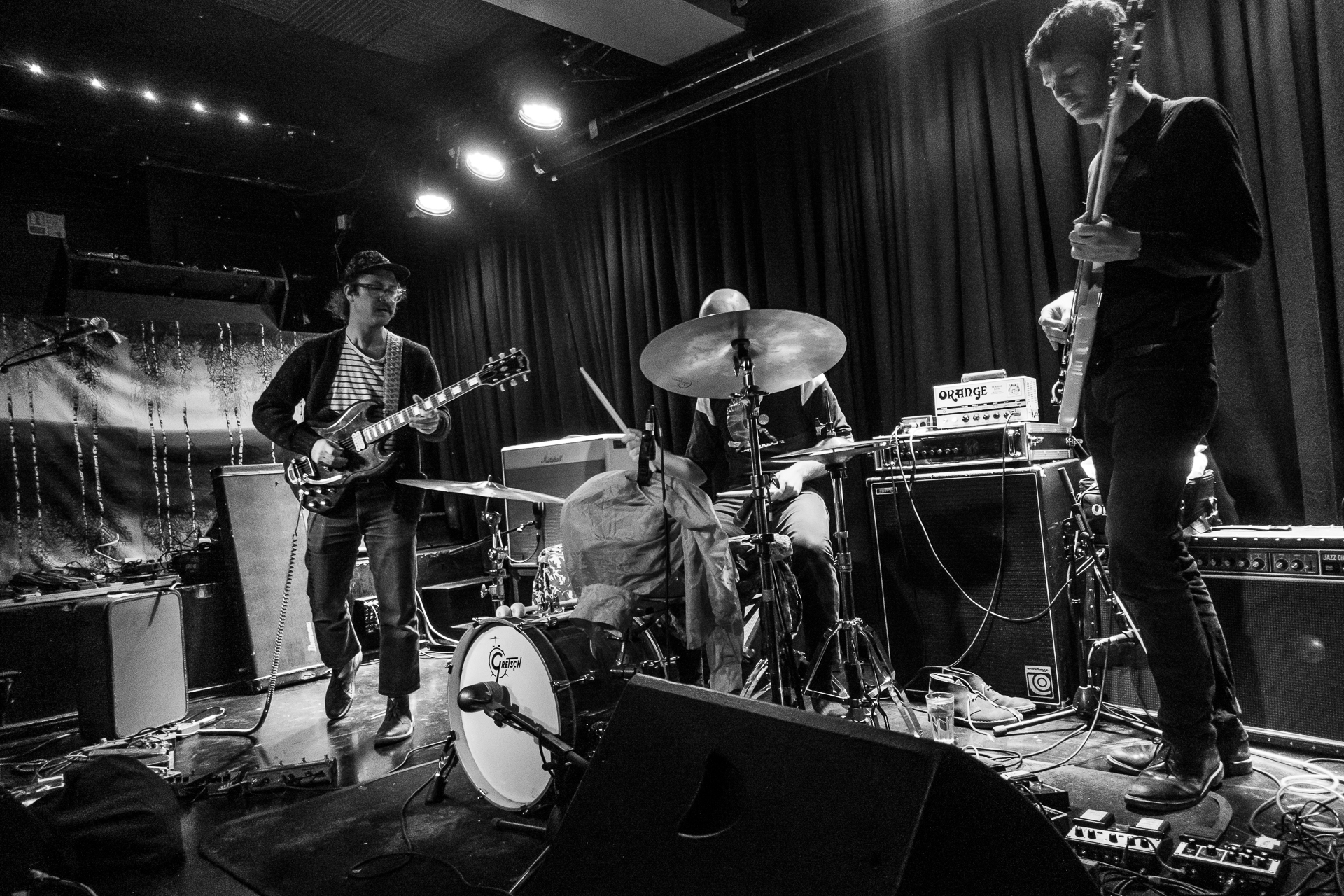
Eternal Tapestry in 2015

Eternal Tapestry was a Portland, Oregon-based psychedelic rock and space rock band. Forming in 2005 and releasing a large number of independent albums and several full-length releases on Thrill Jockey, the band has been dormant since 2015.

== History ==
The group was founded in 2005, based around brothers Jed (drums) and Nick (guitar, vocals) Bindeman and guitarist Dewey Mahood, drawing on the sound of Krautrock, improvisational music, and psychedelic rock.

== Discography ==
Albums

- Eternal Tapestry (2006)
- Seas of Silk (2007)
- The Declining Star (2007)
- Vibrations New Dawn (2007)
- Altar of Grass (2007)
- Mystic Induction (2007)
- Solar Commune (2007)
- Sun Arise (2008)
- Palace of the Night Skies (2009)
- The Invisible Landscape (2009)
- Live at The Artistery May 2nd 2009 (2009)
- Spring Tour 2009 (2009)
- The Hidden Revealed (2009)
- The Net: The Unabomber, LSD, and the Internet (2010)
- Beyond the 4th Door (2011)
- Night Gallery (2011, with Sun Araw)
- Brainwave Entertainment (2011)
- Solar Commune (2011)
- Dawn in 2 Dimensions (2012)
- A World Out of Time (2012)
- Prometheus Rising (2012)
- Mondo Lava and Eternal Tapestry (2012)
- 2013 Tour CD-R (2013)
- Eternal Tapestry (2013)
- Guru Overload (2014)
- Lolo Pass Drifters (2015)
- Wild Strawberries (2015)
- Sleeping on a Dandelion (2016)
