= 2011 in rock music =

This article summarizes the events related to rock music for the year of 2011.

== Notable events ==
=== January ===
- Saving Abel's single "The Sex Is Good" tops the Billboard Mainstream Rock Songs chart for a single week.
- Alter Bridge's single "Isolation" tops the Mainstream Rock chart, and stays there for seven consecutive weeks.
- Cake releases their sixth studio album, Showroom of Compassion. It tops the US all-format Billboard 200 albums chart, selling 44,000 copies in its debut week. It is the band's first album to ever top the chart, and at the time, is the lowest selling album to ever top the chart.
- Cage the Elephant releases their second studio album, Thank You, Happy Birthday. It debuts at number 2 on the Billboard 200, selling 39,000 copies in its opening week.
- The Decemberists release their sixth studio album, The King is Dead. It tops the Billboard 200 chart, selling over 94,000 in its opening week. It is the band's first album to top the chart, and a career-high sales debut for the band as well.
- Social Distortion releases their seventh studio album, Hard Times and Nursery Rhymes. It debuts at number 4 on the Billboard 200, selling 46,000 copies in its debut week. Despite the band's long career, it is their first album to debut in the top ten of the chart.

=== February ===
- Foo Fighters single "Rope" debuts at number one on the Billboard Hot Rock Songs chart. At the time, they are only the second band to ever debut at the top of the chart, after Linkin Park's "The Catalyst". "Rope" goes on to top three separate Billboard song charts - Hot Rock Songs, Alternative Songs, and Mainstream Rock songs. It stays atop of the latter chart for 5 consecutive weeks.
- Red releases their third studio album, Until We Have Faces. It debuts at number 2 on the Billboard 200 chart, selling 43,000 copies.
- At the Super Bowl XLV half-time show, Slash performs a rendition of "Sweet Child O' Mine" with Fergie on vocals. Fergie's performance is not well received, and in retrospect is cited as one of the worst of the Super Bowl's half-time performances.

=== March ===
- Shinedown's single "Diamond Eyes (Boom-Lay Boom-Lay Boom)" tops the Mainstream Rock chart for 3 weeks.
- Panic at the Disco releases their third studio album, Vices & Virtues. It debuts at number 7 on the Billboard 200, selling 56,000 copies. It is the band's only release to be recorded as a duo of Brendon Urie and Spencer Smith, following the departure of guitarist Ryan Ross and bassist Jon Walker, but prior to the bands eventual direction of being a solo project for Urie.
- R.E.M. releases their fifteenth and final studio album prior to their 2011 breakup, Collapse Into Now. It debuts at number 2 on the Billboard 200 chart, selling 57,000 copies. It is the band's tenth album to place in the top ten of the chart.
- Rise Against releases their sixth studio album, Endgame. It debuts at number 2 on the Billboard 200 chart, selling 85,000 copies. The album is the band's highest debuting album of their career in both chart placement and sales.
- The Strokes release their fourth studio album, Angles, after a prolonged and difficult five years of recording. It debuts at number 4 on the Billboard 200, selling 89,000 copies.

=== April ===
- The Foo Fighters release their seventh studio album, Wasting Light. It debuts at the top of the Billboard 200, selling 235,000 copies in its first week. It is the best first album to top the chart. The album continues to sell well in subsequent weeks as well, holding on to number 3 with 72,000 copies sold in its second week, and actually bounces back to number 2 in its third week of sale.
- Radiohead gives a widespread retail release of their eighth studio album, The King of Limbs. Despite being released two months prior directly and exclusively on the band's website, the album still performs well, debuting at number 6 on the Billboard 200, selling 69,000 copies in its first week, and moving up to number 3 in its second week, selling another 67,000 copies.
- Hollywood Undead releases their second studio album, American Tragedy. It debuts at number 4 on the Billboard 200, selling 66,000 copies in its opening week.
- Asking Alexandria releases their second studio album, Reckless & Relentless. It debuts at number 9, selling 31,000, the band's best debut at the time.

=== May ===
- Seether's single titled "Country Song" begins its ten-week run as the top song on the Billboard Mainstream Rock chart.
- Seether releases their fifth studio album, Holding Onto Strings Better Left to Fray. It debuts at number 2 on the Billboard 200, selling 61,000 copies, making it their highest charting debut, and second highest sales debut.
- Sixx A.M. releases their second studio album, This Is Gonna Hurt. It debuts at number 10 on the Billboard 200, selling 30,000 copies.
- Death Cab for Cutie releases their seventh studio album, Codes and Keys. It debuts at number 3 on the Billboard 200, selling 102,000 copies in its first week.
- Eddie Vedder of Pearl Jam releases his second solo studio album, Ukulele Songs. It debuts at number 4 on the Billboard 200, selling 71,000 copies. It is his first solo album to crack to top 10 of the chart.
- My Morning Jacket release their sixth studio album, Circuital. It debuts at number 5 on the Billboard 200, selling 55,000 copies, a career best for the band.
- Flogging Molly releases their fifth studio album, Speed of Darkness. It debuts at number 9 on the Billboard 200, selling 25,000 copies.

=== June ===
- Seether's "Country Song" during its ten-week run atop of the Mainstream Rock Songs, also finds cross-over success, peaking at number 72 on the Billboard all-format Hot 100 song chart.
- Bon Iver releases their second studio album, Bon Iver. It debuts at number 2 on the Billboard 200, selling 104,000 copies.
- Frank Turner releases his fourth album, England Keep My Bones. It peaked at number 12 on the UK albums chart and was certified gold.

=== July ===
- Sixx A.M.'s single "Lies of the Beautiful People" tops the Billboard Mainstream Rock chart, and stays there for 2 weeks.
- Avenged Sevenfold's single "So Far Away" tops the Mainstream Rock chart for 3 weeks.
- Incubus releases their seventh studio album, If Not Now, When?. It debuts at number 2 on the Billboard 200 chart, selling 80,000 copies. It is the band's fourth studio album in a row to debut in the top 2 on the chart.
- Theory of a Deadman releases their fourth studio album, The Truth Is.... It debuts at number 8 on the Billboard 200, selling 38,000 copies in its opening week.
- Sublime with Rome (a reformation of the band Sublime with new singer and guitarist Rome Ramirez) releases their first album together, Yours Truly. It debuts at number 9 on the Billboard 200, selling 35,000 copies in its opening week.
- 3 Doors Down releases their fifth studio album, Time of My Life. It debuts at number 3 on the Billboard 200, selling 60,000 copies. It breaks their two album streak of topping the chart.
- 311 releases their tenth studio album, Universal Pulse. It debuts at number 7 on the Billboard 200 chart, selling 46,000 copies. It is the band's eighth album to debut in the chart's top 10.

=== August ===
- Theory of a Deadman's single "Lowlife" tops the Billboard Mainstream Rock chart, and stays there for 3 weeks.
- Red Hot Chili Peppers release their tenth studio album, and first in 5 years, I'm with You. It debuts at number 2, selling 229,000 copies in its first week. The release is only kept from number 1 in the US by Lil Wayne's Tha Carter IV album release, elsewhere, I'm with You tops 18 other national album charts.

=== September ===
- Foo Fighter's single "Walk" tops the Billboard Mainstream Rock chart for 4 consecutive weeks.
- Blink 182 releases their sixth studio album, Neighborhoods. The album debuts at number 2 on the Billboard 200, selling 151,000 copies. It is the first album the band released in eight years after their 2005 hiatus, and the last album to feature co-founding member Tom Delonge.
- Staind releases their fifth studio album, Chapter V. It debuts at number 5 on the Billboard 200 chart, selling 47,000 copies. It is the band's fourth top 10 album, and their last album released prior to entering a hiatus.
- Pearl Jam releases the live album Pearl Jam Twenty, which serves as a soundtrack to the documentary of the same name. It debuts at number 10 on the Billboard 200, selling 27,000 copies.
- Mastodon releases their fifths studio album, The Hunter. It debuts at number 10 on the Billboard 200 chart, selling 39,000 copies.
- The twentieth anniversary re-issue of Nirvana's Nevermind causes sales to increase by 647%, jumping from 146 to 13 on the Billboard 200 chart, selling 25,000 copies.

=== October ===
- Staind's single "Not Again" tops the Billboard Mainstream Rock chart for four consecutive weeks, and for 7 of 8 weeks total. The song was self-reflective on its difficult recording sessions of its respective album, Chapter V.
- You Me at Six release their third studio album, Sinners Never Sleep. It peaks at number 3 on the UK albums chart and was certified gold.
- Evanescence releases their third studio album, Evanescence. The album tops the Billboard 200 chart, selling 127,000 copies in its opening week. It is the band's second album to top the chart. The album holds on to number 4 in its second week, selling another 40,000 copies.
- Five Finger Death Punch releases their third studio album, American Capitalist. It debuts at number 3 on the Billboard 200 chart, selling 91,000 copies. The album holds on to number 9 in its second week, selling another 29,000 copies.
- Coldplay releases their fifth studio album, Mylo Xyloto. It tops the Billboard 200 chart, selling 447,000 copies. It is the third highest debut on the US chart in 2019, and the biggest debut for a rock album since 2009's No Line on the Horizon by U2. It is the third album for the band to top the chart, and subsequently tops over 17 other nation album charts upon release.

=== November ===
- Seether's single "Tonight tops the Billboard Mainstream Rock chart for a single week, occurring in the middle of Staind's 7 week run at number with the song "Not Again".
- Nickelback releases their seventh studio album, Here and Now. It misses topping the Billboard 200 chart by a .18% margin and ends up debuting at number 2 - Michael Bublé's Christmas sells just over 227,000 copies, while Here and Now sells just under 227,000. It holds on to number 5 in its second week, and stays in the top 10 into the following January.
- Daughtry releases their third studio album, Break the Spell. It debuts at number 8 on the Billboard 200 chart, selling 129,000 copies.

=== December ===
- Chevelle's single "Face to the Floor" tops the Billboard Mainstream Rock charts, and stays for the rest of the month, and eventually for 12 consecutive weeks, running well into 2012.
- The Black Keys release their seventh studio album, El Camino. It debuts at number 2 on the Billboard 200 chart, selling 206,000 copies in its first week.
- Korn releases their eleventh album, The Path of Totality. The album found the band blending their sounds with dubstep. The album debuts at number 10 on the Billboard 200 chart, selling 55,000 copies in its opening week.

== Deaths ==
- Poly Styrene, frontwoman for X-Ray Spex, died on April 25 at age 53 due to breast cancer.
- Taiji Sawada, former bassist of X Japan and Loudness, died on July 17 at the age of 45 from complications arising from a suicide attempt.
- Mikey Welsh, ex-bassist for Weezer, died in October. While only performing on one studio album, Weezer (Green album), he does perform on some of the bands most popular singles from it, including "Hash Pipe" and "Island in the Sun".

== Band breakups ==
- The White Stripes.
- R.E.M.
- The Academy Is...
- Silverchair
