= Krai (album) =

Studio album by Olga Bell
- Released: April 29, 2014
- Studio: Machines With Magnets
- Label: New Amsterdam Records / One Little Indian Records

Olga Bell chronology
Diamonte	Krai	Incitation (EP)

Singles from Krai
- 1. "Perm Krai" Released: March 3, 2014

Krai or Край is a full-length studio album by Russian-born New York singer-songwriter Olga Bell. It is her second solo album, and her first release on independent label One Little Indian Records/New Amsterdam Records. An exploration of themes of territory and identity, the album is sung entirely in Russian.

== Title ==
The album's title, Krai — Край in the Cyrillic alphabet used to write Russian — can be translated variously as edge, frontier, limit, region, or wilderness. Each song on the album also contains the word Край/Krai in its title, because each one focuses on one of Russia's far-flung края (the plural of край) — administrative districts of Russia, yet another meaning of the word.

== Recording and production ==
Krai began as a project Bell put together for the 2011 Ecstatic Music Festival, originally intended as a one-time performance. Following the show, however, she was awarded a grant by the American Composers Forum to create an album based on the initial project.

The songs on the album were written for six voices, four female and two male, but Bell herself performed all six parts. She also played jaw harp and keyboards on the album. Bell's compositions called for cello, electric bass, electric guitar, glockenspiel, kit drums, mallet percussion, and vibraphone players to collaborate with her. Some of the other musicians who contributed to the album were Andrea Lee (cello), Grey McMurray (electric guitar), Jason Nazary (kit drums and other percussion, plus glockenspiel and vibraphone), and Gunnar Olsen (kit drums and other percussion).

Recording took place at Pawtucket, Rhode Island's Machines With Magnets studio. Keith Souza and Seth Manchester performed recording and mixing; Heba Kadry of Timeless Mastering mastered the album.

The lettering and layout for the album cover were designed by Jessica Hische.

== Music and lyrics ==
"Krasnodar Krai", the first track on the album, "tells the story of a Cossack warrior riding home" to find 'home' has changed. The Quietus described second track "Altai Krai" as having "the feel of a square dance," while The New York Times noted its use of the throat singing indigenous to the Altai region. Third track "Perm Krai" was characterized as "smooth fusion with art-prog and metal edges, like a chance meeting of Basia, Henry Cow, and Marnie Stern." The album's fourth track "Stavropol Krai" is a "lament" in which archangels meet a sinful soul, according to The New York Times. "Krasnoyarsk Krai", track 5, features eclectic instrumentation "and Bell's ghostly, pitched-down vocals." A "flurry of Rhodes electric piano" is notable in 6th track "Primorsky Krai", also described as melodic. The New York Times review went on to describe how Bell "sobs pridefully" in "Khabarovsk Krai", track 8, with lyrics praising "Russia, Mother Russia, Russian Motherland". The final track on the album, "Kamchatka Krai", features "changing tempos, piercing guitar lines, and ecstatic vocal swoops," has lyrics referencing shamans and percussion instruments, and is also characterized by "combative vocals and shrill electric guitars."

== Release ==
The world premiere of Krai took place on February 13, 2014 at Minneapolis's Walker Art Center. "Perm Krai", the first single, was released by Pitchfork on March 3, 2014. The album's label is New Amsterdam Records for North America, but One Little Indian Records outside North America.

== Critical reception ==
Peter Margasak of Chicago Reader described how Krai "alternates between dense and frenetic, airy and meditative, but the arrangements are never less than rigorous." The New York Times's Stacey Anderson called Krai "a folkloric study of her homeland and a contemporary exercise in electronic production," and noted that the album was "drastically removed from the pop structures of the Dirty Projectors and her other band, the dance duo Nothankyou." It's "a stirring collection of strange, thrilling noises where it's difficult to know, exactly, what is going on" to critic Jayson Greene of Pitchfork, who concluded that Bell's "mesmerizing, eventful, and strange album brings these remote voices close enough to feel their breath in our ears." Jody Beth of The Quietus praised "Bell's aptitude for melody" and called the album "great and intriguing and perplexing", comparing Bell's work to that of Kate Bush and Trio Bulgarka, while acknowledging that "[t]he 'everything all the time' aspect to Krai — the province of unsung artists who want to put all their heady ideas out there at once — makes it as exhausting as it is impressive." Less conflicted in her praise, reviewer Helen Brown of The Telegraph described the album as "a journey across the vastness of Russia" and dismissed its flaws as "blips in an otherwise richly rewarding odyssey."

Krai was named one of The Quietus's "Albums of the Year" honorees for 2014.

== Track listing ==
Credits adapted from the liner notes of Krai.

Krai
No.	Title	Writer(s)	Cyrillic title	Length
1.	"Krasnodar Krai"	Marina Bell, Olga Bell	Краснодарский Край	6:53
2.	"Altai Krai"	Marina Bell, Olga Bell	Алтайский Край	4:25
3.	"Perm Krai"	traditional	Пермский Край	4:35
4.	"Stavropol Krai"	traditional	Ставропольский Край	6:13
5.	"Krasnoyarsk Krai"	Marina Bell, Olga Bell	Красноярский Край	3:02
6.	"Primorsky Krai"	Marina Bell, Olga Bell	Приморский Край	3:04
7.	"Zabaikalsky Krai"	traditional	Забайкальский Край	3:28
8.	"Khabarovsk Krai"	Marina Bell, Olga Bell	Хабаровский Край	5:14
9.	"Kamchatka Krai"	Marina Bell, Olga Bell	Камчатский Край	2:36
