= Future (disambiguation) =

The future is the time after the present.

Future or The Future may also refer to:

== Music ==
=== Performers ===
- Future (rapper) (born 1983), American rapper
- The Human League, previously The Future, an English synth-pop band
- The Future X, a pop group created in Los Angeles in 2022 by Simon Fuller

=== Albums ===
- Future (Don Diablo album), 2018
- Future (Future album), 2017
- Future (Schiller album) or the title song, 2016
- Future (The Seeds album), 1967
- The Future (From Ashes to New album) or the title song, 2018
- The Future (Guy album) or the title song, 1990
- The Future (Leonard Cohen album) or the title song, 1992
- The Future (Rodney P album) or the title song, 2004
- The Future, by Mr. Del, 2005

=== Songs ===
- "Future" (Madonna and Quavo song), 2019
- "The Future" (song), by Prince, 1990
- "I Miss You" / "The Future", by Cute, 2014
- "Future", by Chai from Punk, 2019
- "Future", by Golden Earring from Cut, 1982
- "Future", by J-Hope from Jack in the Box, 2022
- "Future", by Jagged Edge from J.E. Heartbreak 2, 2014
- "Future", by Paramore from Paramore, 2013
- "Future", by Red Velvet from the soundtrack of the TV series Start-Up, 2020
- "The Future", by Bo Burnham from The Inside Outtakes, 2022
- "The Future", by David Guetta from Nothing but the Beat, 2011
- "The Future", by Joe Budden from Padded Room, 2009
- "The Future", by San Holo, 2017
- "The Future", by the Drums from the self-titled album, 2010
- "The Future (Isn't What It Used to Be)", by Pseudo Echo from Teleporter, 2000
- "Good Morning (The Future)", by Rogue Wave from Permalight, 2010

== Television, film, and audio ==
- The Future (film), a 2011 film by Miranda July
- The Future (audio drama), an audio drama based on the British TV series Doctor Who
- Future Television, a Lebanese television broadcaster
- Steven Universe Future, a 2019 American animated television series; epilogue to Steven Universe
  - "The Future" (Steven Universe Future), the 2020 final episode of Steven Universe Future
- "The Future" (The Amazing World of Gumball), a 2019 episode of The Amazing World of Gumball
- "The Future", a Series F episode of the television series QI (2009)

== Literature ==
- The Future (Leroux novel), a 2020 novel by Catherine Leroux (English translation released in 2023)
- The Future (Alderman novel), a 2023 novel by Naomi Alderman

== Other uses ==
- Future (programming), a computer science term
- Future (train), an excursion train in Taiwan
- Future Group, Indian private conglomerate
- Future perfect, a grammatical form to describe an event expected to happen before a time of reference in the future
- Future plc, a British publishing company
- Futures studies, study of social and technological advancement
- Future Systems, a London-based architectural and design practice
- Future tense, in grammar
- The Future: Six Drivers of Global Change, a 2013 book by Al Gore
- The Future Awards Africa, a Nigerian award series for youths 18–30
- Futurist, a studier of futurology

== See also ==
- Al-Mustaqbal (disambiguation)
- Ancient Future (disambiguation)
- Futur (disambiguation)
- Futures (disambiguation)
- Futurism (disambiguation)
- Viitorul (disambiguation)
