= World of Tomorrow =

World of Tomorrow or Worlds of Tomorrow may refer to:

- Worlds of Tomorrow, a science fiction anthology series
- Worlds of Tomorrow (magazine), a science fiction magazine
- World of Tomorrow (film), a series of animated short films
- World of Tomorrow, the fictional setting in the Sky Captain and the World of Tomorrow
- "The world of tomorrow", motto of the 1939 New York World's Fair
  - The World of Tomorrow (film), a documentary about the 1939 World's Fair

== See also ==
- 2099: World of Tomorrow, a comic book series by Marvel Comics
- The World Tomorrow (disambiguation)
- Tomorrow's World (disambiguation)
- Tomorrow, the World! (1944 film)
- Future World (disambiguation)
