= Future World =

Future World may refer to:

- The future of Earth, as described by current scientific theory
- The afterlife, the concept that consciousness continues after death

Future World, Futureworld, or variation, may also refer to:

== Film ==
- Futureworld, the 1976 sequel to the 1973 science fiction film Westworld
  - Westworld (franchise), the franchise in which "Futureworld" takes place
- Future World (film), a science fiction film directed by James Franco

== Music ==
=== Albums ===
- Future World (Pretty Maids album), a 1987 album by the heavy metal band Pretty Maids
- Future World (Artension album), a 2004 album by progressive metal band Artension
- Futureworld (album), a 1999 album by Trans Am
- Futureworld (soundtrack), a 1976 album for the eponymous Westworld film Futureworld

=== Songs ===
- "Future World" (Helloween song), a 1987 song by Helloween
- "Future World" (Every Little Thing song), a 1996 single album and song from the J-pop band Every Little Thing
- "Future World" (Pretty Maids song), a 1987 song by Pretty Maids from the eponymous album Future World (Pretty Maids album)
- "Future World" (Artension song), a 2004 song by Artension from the eponymous album Future World (Artension album)
- "Futureworld" (song), a 1999 song by Trans Am from the eponymous album Futureworld (album)
- "Futureworld Main Theme", a 1976 song from the eponymous Westworld film Futureworld

== Other uses ==
- Future World, a former themed land that encompassed the northern half of Walt Disney World's Epcot theme park, since subdivided into three smaller themed lands; World Celebration, World Discovery, and World Nature
- Future World, a planned theme land in the canceled Disney WestCOT theme park
- Future Worlds, an RPG from Stellar Gaming Workshop released in 1987
- FutureWorld (Milton Keynes), a housing exhibition held in Milton Keynes in 1994

== See also ==
- Future (disambiguation)
- World (disambiguation)
- Future Worlds Center (founded 1991) a social justice non-profit NGO
- World Future Society (founded 1966) a futurist organization
- World Future Council (founded 2007) an advocacy group "to preserve the world for future generations"
- The World Tomorrow (disambiguation)
- Tomorrow's World (disambiguation)
