= Life Coach (album) =

Studio album by Phil Manley
- Released: January 25, 2011
- Length: 36:15
- Label: Thrill Jockey

Phil Manley chronology
Life Coach (2011)	Surrender to the Night (1997)

Life Coach is a studio album by Phil Manley of the band Trans Am, released in 2011.

== Critical reception ==
Professional ratings
Aggregate scores
Source	Rating
Metacritic	64/100
Review scores
Source	Rating
The 405	8/10
AllMusic	3.5/5 stars
Loud and Quiet	2/10
NME	6/10
Pitchfork	6.5/10
Popmatters	5/10

Life Coach was met with generally favorable reviews from critics. At Metacritic, which assigns a weighted average rating out of 100 to reviews from mainstream publications, the album received an average score of 64, based on 7 reviews.

== Track listing ==
No.	Title	Length
1.	"FT2 Theme"	2:35
2.	"Commercial Potential"	3:01
3.	"Lawrence, KS"	4:05
4.	"Forest Opening Theme"	4:15
5.	"Work It Out"	5:06
6.	"Make Good Choices"	3:37
7.	"Gay Bathers"	1:27
8.	"Night Visions"	9:29
9.	"Life Coach"	2:45
