= British Aerospace =

Aerospace and defence company

British Aerospace plc
- Type: Statutory corporation (1977–1980); Public (1980–1999)
- Industry: Aerospace
- Predecessor: British Aircraft Corporation; Hawker Siddeley; Scottish Aviation
- Founded: 29 April 1977; 49 years ago
- Defunct: 30 November 1999; 26 years ago
- Fate: Merged with Marconi Electronic Systems
- Successor: BAE Systems
- Headquarters: Farnborough, Hampshire, England, UK
- Products: Aircraft
- Subsidiaries: Rover Group (1988–1994); Britten-Norman (1998)
- Website: bae.co.uk at the Wayback Machine (archived 1998-01-21)

British Aerospace plc (BAe) was a British aircraft, munitions and defence-systems manufacturer that was formed in 1977. Its head office was at Warwick House in the Farnborough Aerospace Centre in Farnborough, Hampshire, England. It purchased Marconi Electronic Systems, the defence electronics and naval shipbuilding subsidiary of the General Electric Company, in 1999 to form BAE Systems.

== History ==
=== Formation and privatisation ===
The company has its origins in the Aircraft and Shipbuilding Industries Act 1977, which called for the nationalisation and merger of the British Aircraft Corporation, Hawker Siddeley Aviation, Hawker Siddeley Dynamics and Scottish Aviation. On 29 April 1977, the new entity was formed in the United Kingdom as a statutory corporation.

British Aerospace Act 1980 (Note: Section 15(1).)
- Act of Parliament
- Parliament of the United Kingdom
- Long title: An Act to provide for the vesting of all the property, rights, liabilities and obligations of British Aerospace in a company nominated by the Secretary of State and the subsequent dissolution of British Aerospace; and to make provision with respect to the finances of that company.
- Citation: 1980 c. 26
- Territorial extent: United Kingdom (Note: Section 15(3).)

Dates
- Royal assent: 1 May 1980
- Commencement: 1 January 1981 (Note: The British Aerospace (Appointed Day) Order 1980 (SI 1980/1988).)
Other legislation
Amended by	Insolvency Act 1986; Companies Act 1989; Taxation of Chargeable Gains Act 1992; Statute Law (Repeals) Act 2004; Companies Act 2006 (Consequential Amendments etc) Order 2008; Public Bodies (Abolition of British Shipbuilders) Order 2013
Relates to	Aircraft and Shipbuilding Industries Act 1977

Status: Amended

Text of statute as originally enacted

Revised text of statute as amended

Text of the British Aerospace Act 1980 as in force today (including any amendments) within the United Kingdom, from legislation.gov.uk.

Under the provisions of the British Aerospace Act 1980 (c. 26), on 1 January the statutory corporation was transferred to a limited company, which then re-registered as a public limited company (plc), under the name "British Aerospace Public Limited Company", on 2 January 1981. BAe was privatised in two main phases, the first in February 1981, involving 51.6% shares of the company, during which the public sale was 3.5 times subscribed and at the end of the first day's trading, share prices were 14% above the original offer price. The second phase occurred in May 1985, in which 48.4% shares were sold; this sale was 5.4 times subscribed and the first day closing price was 11% above the initial offer price. The British Government maintained a £1 golden share, which allowed it to veto foreign control of the board or company.

=== Programmes ===
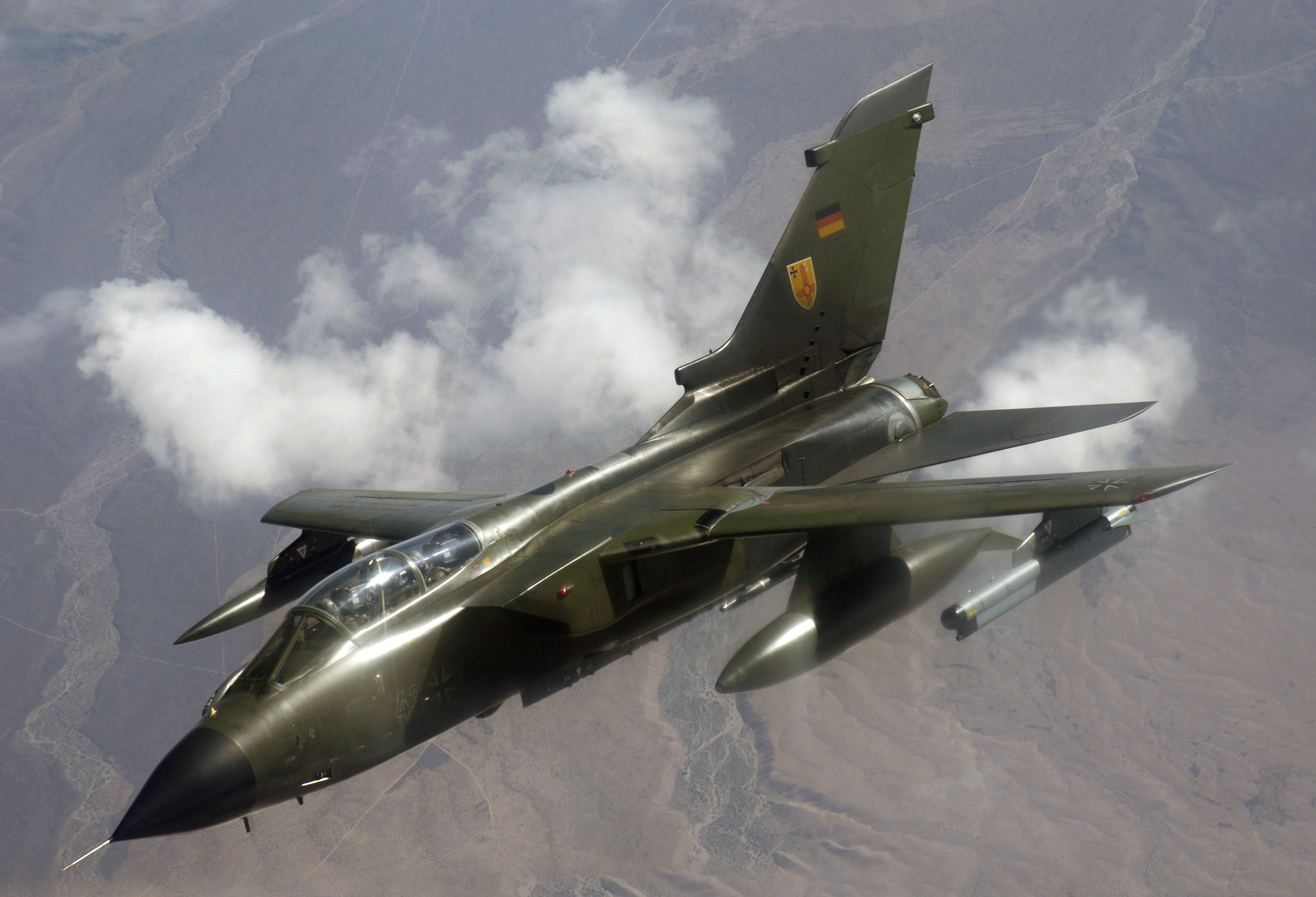
A German Air Force Tornado IDS in flight, 2007

British Aerospace inherited a number of live development programmes from its predecessors. Scottish Aviation was working on a project for a 19-seat turboprop airliner, an upgraded version of the Handley Page Jetstream. BAe placed the Jetstream 31 into production after the first flight of the prototype in March 1980. At the same time, production of Hawker Siddeley's HS 125 business jet, Harrier VTOL jet fighter and HS 748 turboprop airliner continued under BAe, as did that of the Trident jet airliner for a short time. Similarly, low-rate production of the BAC One-Eleven jet airliner, the Strikemaster two-seat military jet trainer/attack aircraft, and the iconic Concorde supersonic airliner also continued.

On 29 July 1976, less than a year prior to BAe's formation, the contract for production of the first batch of the Panavia Tornado, an advanced nuclear-capable fighter bomber, was signed. It was developed and produced via a multinational company, Panavia Aircraft GmbH, of which BAe was one of several companies to be heavily involved. On 10 July 1979, the maiden flight of a production Tornado occurred. On 5 and 6 June 1979, the first aircraft were delivered to the RAF and German Air Force respectively. On 25 September 1981, the first Italian Tornado was delivered.

The Tornado would be produced in large numbers, the 500th aircraft to be completed was delivered to West Germany on 19 December 1987. Production of the Tornado ended in 1998, the final batch being delivered to the Royal Saudi Air Force, that had ordered a total of 96 IDS Tornados. Aviation author Jon Lake noted that "The Trinational Panavia Consortium produced just short of 1,000 Tornados, making it one of the most successful postwar bomber programs".

In 1978, BAe relaunched the BAe 146, a short-haul regional airliner that had been previously worked on by Hawker Siddeley. The company marketed it as a quiet and economic turbofan-powered compact airliner that could replace the previous generation of turboprop-powered feeder aircraft. In 1982, the first completed aircraft made its first flight. Upon its launch into service the following year, it was hailed as being "the world's quietest jetliner". In 1993, an upgraded model of the BAe 146, referred to as the Avro RJ series, superseded the original; changes included the replacement of the original Lycoming ALF 502 turbofan engines by higher-thrust LF 507 turbofan engines, which were housed in redesigned nacelles. The Avro RJ series also featured a modernised cockpit with EFIS replacing the analogue ADI, HSI, and engine instrumentation. Production of the Avro RJ ended with the final four aircraft being delivered in late 2003; a total of 173 Avro RJ aircraft was delivered between 1993 and 2003.

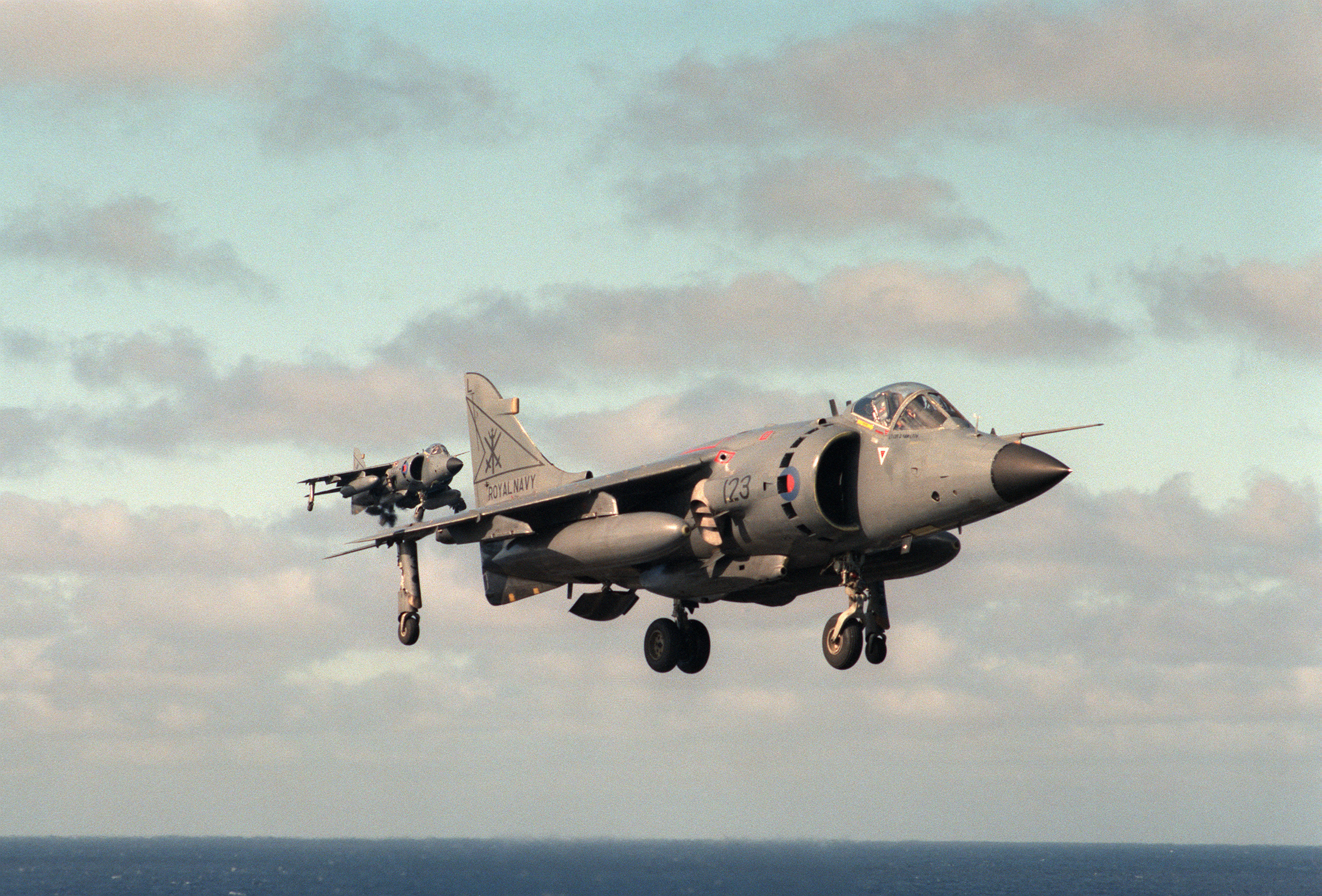
A 800 NAS Sea Harrier FRS1 from HMS Illustrious in post-Falklands War low-visibility paint scheme

BAe developed several advanced models of the Harrier family. In 1978, the Royal Navy received the first BAe Sea Harrier of an initial order for 24. The Sea Harrier was declared operational three years later, being initially embarked on both the first Invincible class aircraft carrier HMS Invincible, and the older HMS Hermes. Following their decisive role in the 1982 Falklands War, several of the lessons learnt from the conflict shaped a new upgrade programme for the fleet authorised in 1984, resulting in the Sea Harrier FRS.2 (later known as FA2). The first flight of the prototype took place in September 1988 and a contract was signed for 29 upgraded aircraft in December of that year. The Sea Harrier FA2 was fitted with the Blue Vixen radar, which was described as one of the most advanced pulse doppler radar systems in the world.

In August 1981, BAe and the American aircraft manufacturer McDonnell Douglas signed a memorandum of understanding regarding the McDonnell Douglas AV-8B Harrier II. Under this agreement, BAe was effectively a subcontractor rather than a full partner, receiving 40 per cent of the airframe's work-share in terms of man-hours. Production took place at McDonnell Douglas' facilities in suburban St Louis, Missouri, and manufacturing by BAe at its Kingston and Dunsfold facilities in Surrey, England. The variant procured for the RAF, which was known as the BAe Harrier II, featured many differences, including avionics fit, armaments and equipment; the wing of the GR5 featured a stainless steel leading edge, giving it different flex characteristics from the AV-8B. In December 1989, the first RAF squadron to be equipped with the Harrier II was declared operational.

In 1979, BAe officially joined the multinational aircraft manufacturer Airbus and acquired a 20% share in the venture, the move effectively reversed a decision made ten years prior in which the UK government had withdrawn its support for the Airbus consortium. Airbus' first aircraft, the A300, had been received with little initial demand, but orders for the airliner had picked up in the late 1970s. By 1979, the consortium had 256 orders for A300, and Airbus had launched its second airliner, the A310, less than 12 months prior to BAe formally joining the consortium. As time went on, it was becoming clear that Airbus was no longer a temporary collaboration to produce a single design as per its original mission statement; it had become a long-term brand for the development of further aircraft. By the late 1980s, work had begun on a pair of new wide-body airliners, the biggest to be produced at this point under the Airbus name; these would be launched in the 1990s as the Airbus A330 and the Airbus A340.

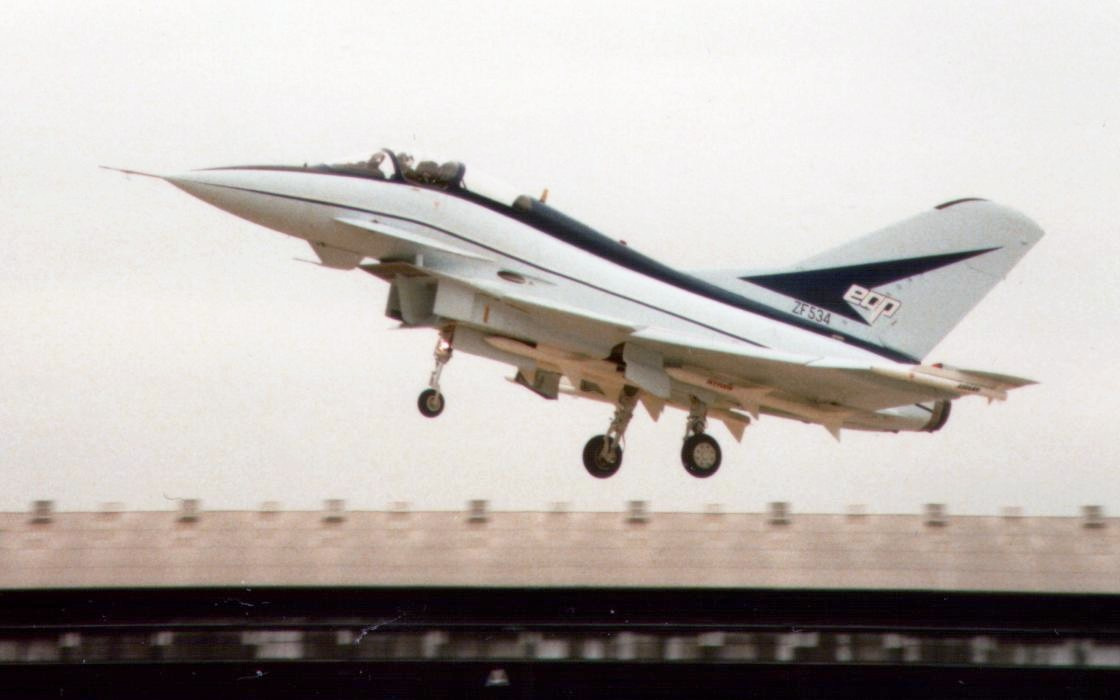
A British Aerospace EAP at the Farnborough Air Show, 1986

During the 1983 Paris Air Show, the launch of the Experimental Aircraft Programme (EAP) to develop and fly an advanced fighter technology demonstrator was announced; at this point, the effort was intended to be a partnership between Britain and several of its European neighbours, including West Germany and Italy. The resulting aircraft, the British Aerospace EAP, ended up being primarily developed by BAe as a private venture; it formed the basis for the multinational Eurofighter Typhoon. In 1986, in conjunction Alenia Aeronautica, CASA and DASA, BAe formed Eurofighter GmbH for the development and production of the Eurofighter. The multinational organisation's head office was established in Hallbergmoos, Bavaria, Germany. The maiden flight of the Eurofighter prototype took place in Bavaria on 27 March 1994, flown by DASA chief test pilot Peter Weger. On 30 January 1998, the first production contract for the Eurofighter was signed between Eurofighter GmbH, engine manufacturer Eurojet and the NATO Eurofighter and Tornado Management Agency, the organisation set up to manage the procurement of the aircraft.

On 26 September 1985, the UK and Saudi Arabian governments signed the Al-Yamamah arms deal with BAe as prime contractor. The contracts, extended in the 1990s and never fully detailed, involved the supply of Panavia Tornado strike and air defence aircraft, BAe Hawk trainer jets, Rapier missile systems, infrastructure works and naval vessels. The Al Yamamah deals are valued at anything up to £20 billion and still continue to provide a large percentage of BAE Systems' profits.

=== Acquisitions and restructuring ===
BAe acquired Royal Ordnance, the British armaments manufacturer, for £190 million on 22 April 1987. The German armaments specialist Heckler & Koch was folded into this division after BAe acquired it four years later.

In 1988, BAe purchased the Rover Group from the British government of Margaret Thatcher for £150 million. The sale was controversial due to opaque financial arrangements between the government and BAe; however the House of Commons Trade and Industry Committee was said to believe that "in spite of a catalogue of complaints, the committee concludes that the sale to BAe may well have been the best solution for the government."

In 1991, BAe acquired a 30% interest in Hutchison Telecommunications through a stock swap deal, where Hutchison was given a controlling stake of 65% in BAe's wholly owned subsidiary Microtel Communications Ltd. In August 1991, BAe formed a naval systems joint venture, BAeSEMA, with the Sema Group. (BAe acquired Sema's 50% share in 1998.) That year also saw BAe begin to experience major difficulties. BAe saw its share price fall below 100p for the first time. On 9 September 1991, the company issued a profits warning and later that week "bungled" the launch of a £432 million rights issue. On 25 September 1991 BAe directors led by CEO Richard Evans ousted the Chairman Professor Sir Roland Smith in a move described by The Independent as "one of the most spectacular and brutal boardroom coups witnessed in many years." Evans described the troubles as a confluence of events:

"our property company [Arlington Securities] was hit with a lousy market. Sales of the Rover Group sank by about a fifth and losses mounted. The government's defence spending volumes underwent a major review. Losses in our commercial aerospace division increased dramatically with the recession in the airline industry."

In mid-1992, BAe wrote off £1 billion of assets, largely as part of redundancies and restructuring of its regional aircraft division. This was the largest asset write-off in UK corporate history. General Electric Company (GEC), later to sell its defence interests to BAe, came close to acquiring BAe at this time. BAe cut 47% of its workforce (60,000 out of 127,000), 40,000 of which were from the regional aircraft division.

Evans decided to sell several of the firm's non-core business activities, these included the Rover Group, Arlington Securities, BAe Corporate Jets, BAe Communications and Ballast Nedam. Although the rationale of diversification had been sound (to shield the company from cyclical aerospace and defence markets), the struggling company could not afford to continue the position: "We simply could not afford to carry two core businesses, cars and aerospace. At one point Rover was eating up about £2 billion of our banking capacity." BAe Corporate Jets and Arkansas Aerospace were sold to Raytheon in 1993. In 1994, the Rover Group was sold to BMW and British Aerospace Space Systems was sold to Matra Marconi Space. In 1998, BAe's shareholding of Orange was reduced to 5%. The Orange shareholding was a legacy of the 30% stake in Hutchison Telecommunications (UK) Ltd.

In 1994, BAeSEMA, Siemens Plessey and GEC-Marconi formed UKAMS Limited as part of the Principal Anti-Air Missile System (PAAMS) consortium. UKAMS would become a wholly owned subsidiary of BAe Dynamics in 1998. In 1995, Saab Military Aircraft and BAe signed an agreement for the joint development and marketing of the export version of the JAS 39 Gripen. In 1996, BAe and Matra Defense agreed to merge their missile businesses into a joint venture called Matra BAe Dynamics. In 1997, BAe joined the Lockheed Martin X-35 Joint Strike Fighter team. The following year, BAe acquired the UK operations of Siemens Plessey Systems (SPS) from Siemens, while DASA purchased SPS' German assets.

In the 1990s, BAe was the largest exporter based in the United Kingdom; a Competition Commission report released in 2005 calculated a ten-year aggregate figure of £45 billion, with defence sales accounting for approximately 80%.

=== Transition to BAE Systems ===
In the late 1990s, European defence consolidation became a prevailing practice; European governments wished to see the merger of their defence manufacturers into a single entity, a European Aerospace and Defence Company. This ambition led to numerous reports linking various European defence groups – mainly with each other but also with American defence contractors. In July 1998, merger discussions began between BAe and DASA. Terms for such a merger had been reportedly agreed between BAe Chairman Richard Evans and DASA CEO Jürgen Schrempp in December 1998. However, when the British General Electric Company (GEC) put its defence electronics business Marconi Electronic Systems (MES) up for sale on 22 December 1998, BAe's management opted to abandon the DASA merger in favour of purchasing its British rival. During 2004, Evans stated that his fear was that an American defence contractor would acquire MES and challenge both British Aerospace and DASA.

Schrempp was angered by BAe's reversal, and opted to pursue other partner companies for DASA to merge with. On 11 June 1999, the Spanish aircraft company CASA signed a memorandum of understanding for such a merger. On 14 October 1999, DASA agreed to merge with Aérospatiale-Matra to create the European Aeronautic Defence and Space Company (EADS). 10 July 2000 was "day one" for the new company, which became the world's second-largest aerospace company after Boeing and the second-largest European arms manufacturer after BAE Systems.

The GEC merger to create a solely British company, compared to the prospective Anglo-German company that would have resulted from merging with DASA, was promoted as having superior prospects for further penetration of the lucrative defence market of the United States. The newly combined company, which was initially referred to as "New British Aerospace", was officially formed on 30 November 1999; it is named BAE Systems.

== Products ==
=== Aircraft ===
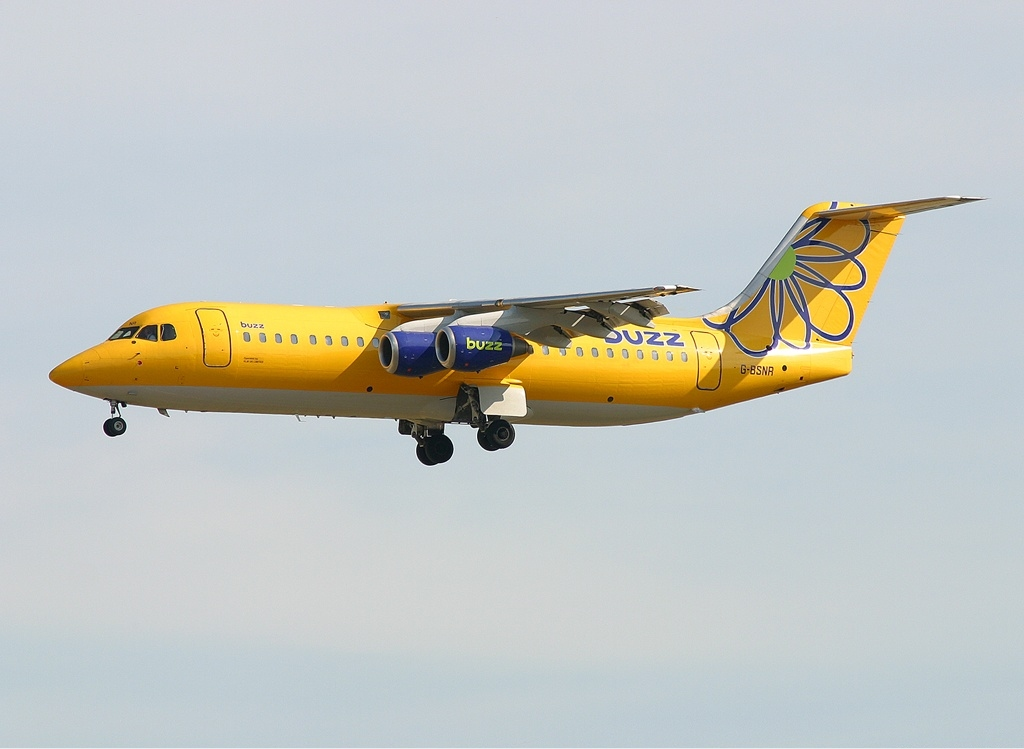
A BAe 146–300 operated by Buzz

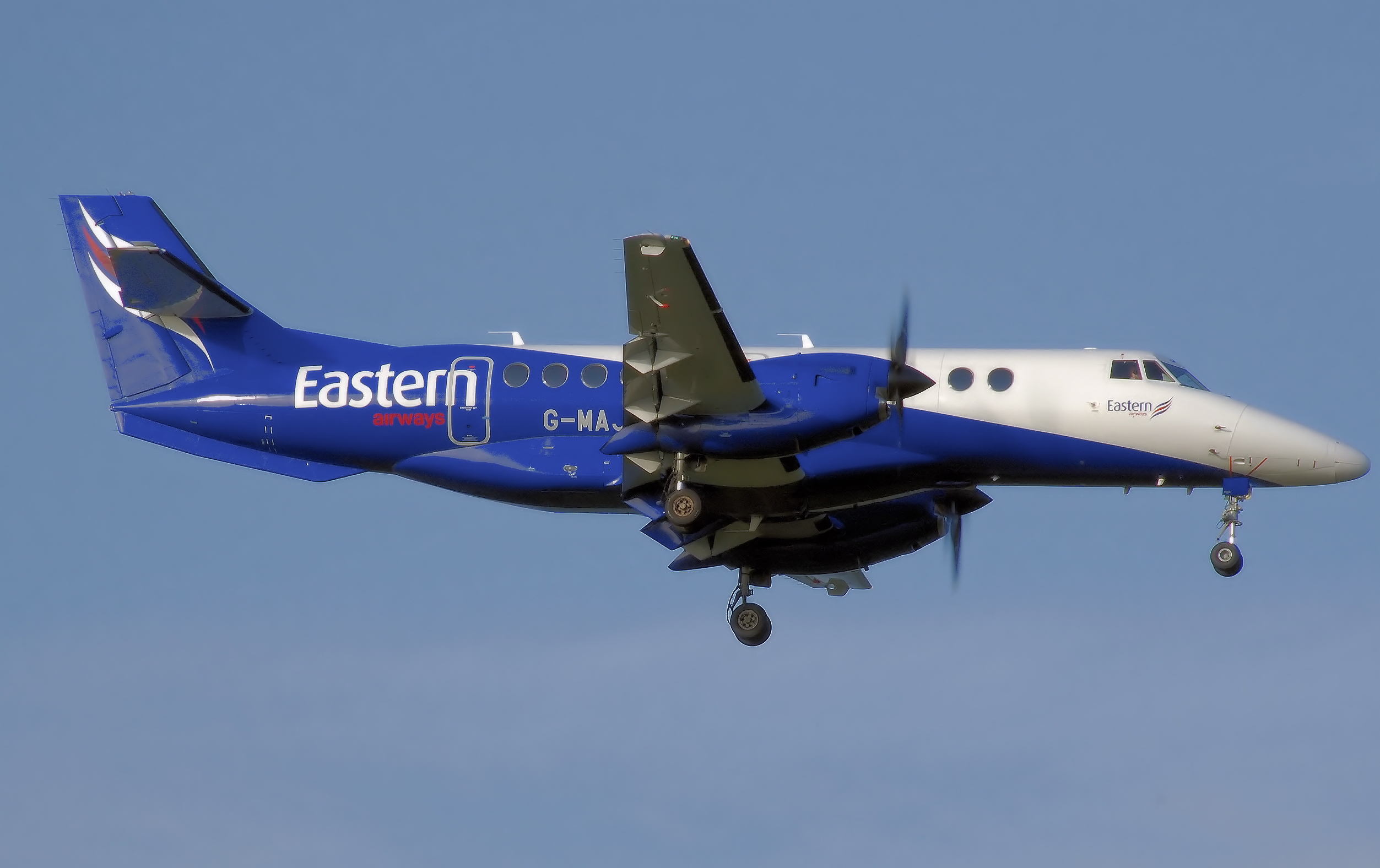
A BAe Jetstream 41 operated by Eastern Airways

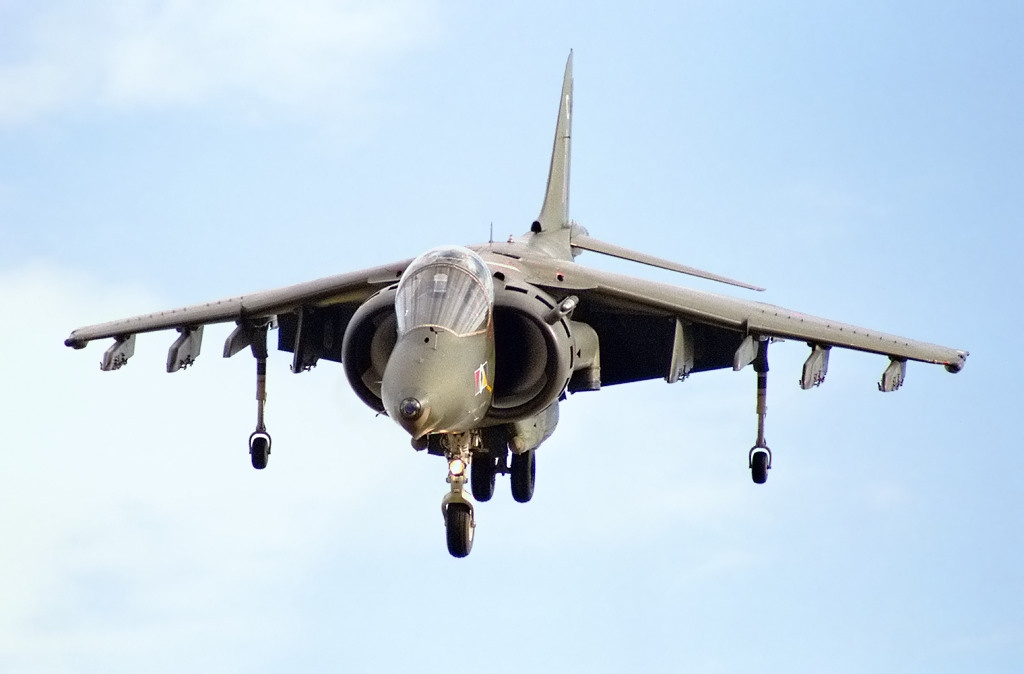
Harrier GR5

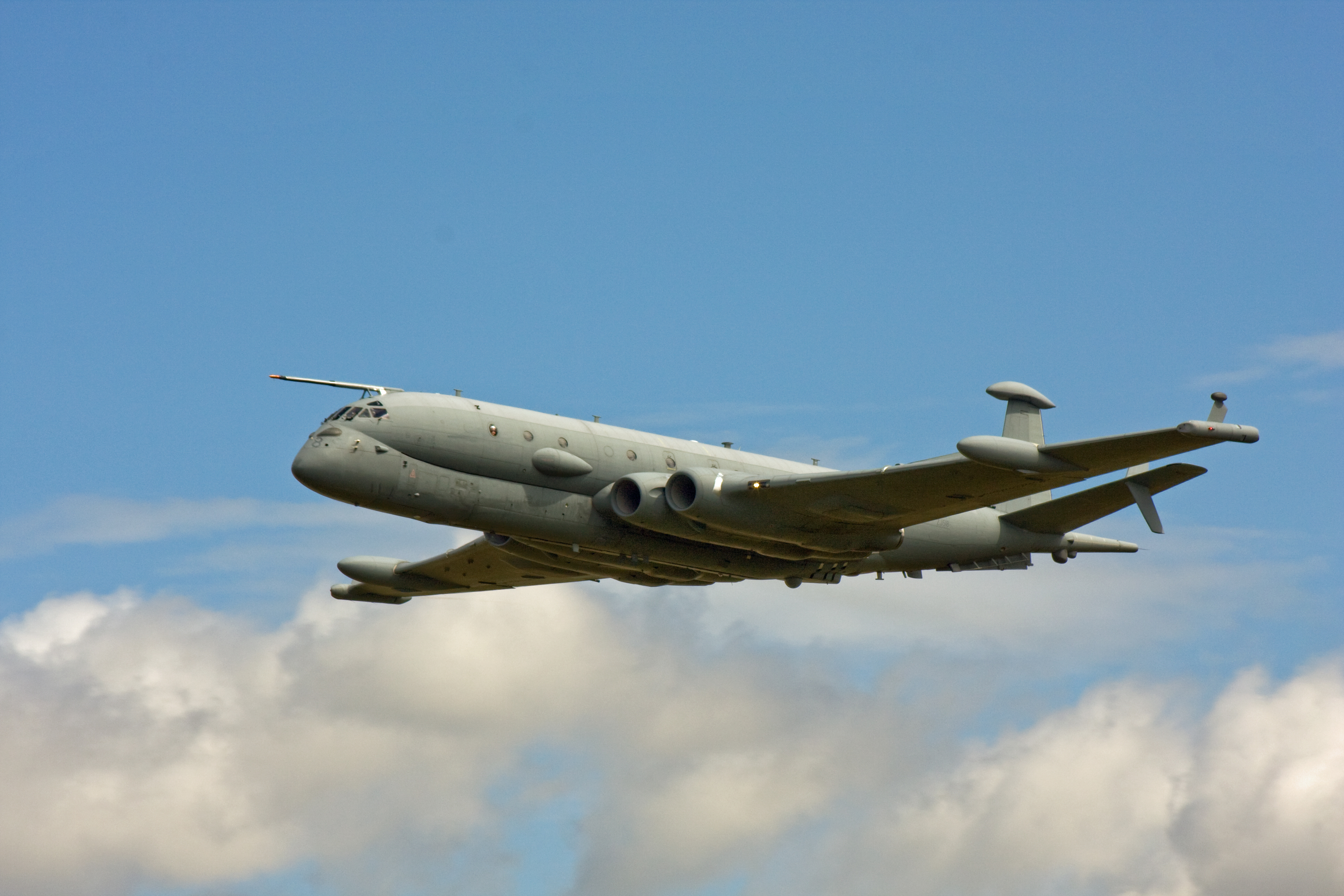
BAe Nimrod MRA4

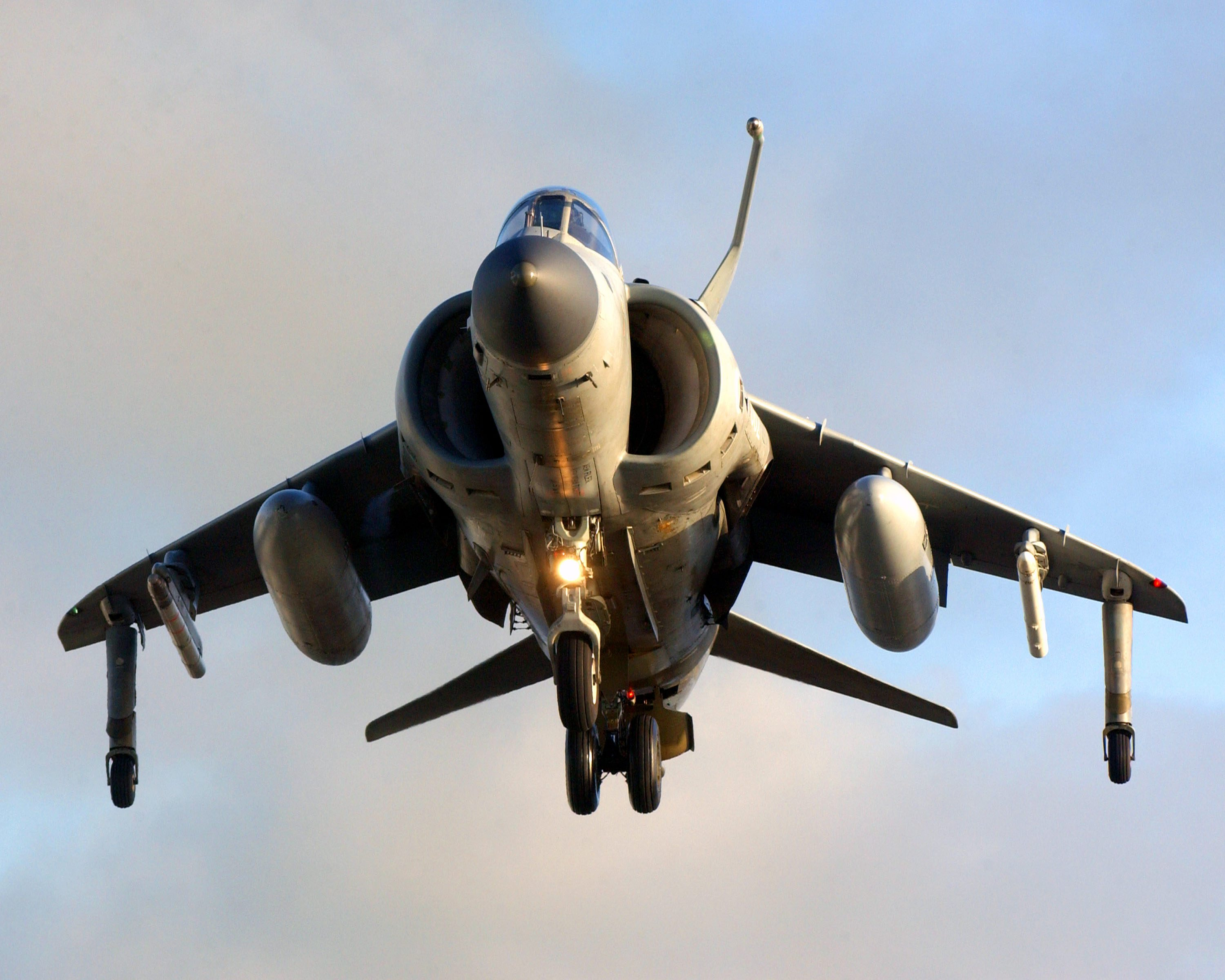
Sea Harrier FA2 hovering

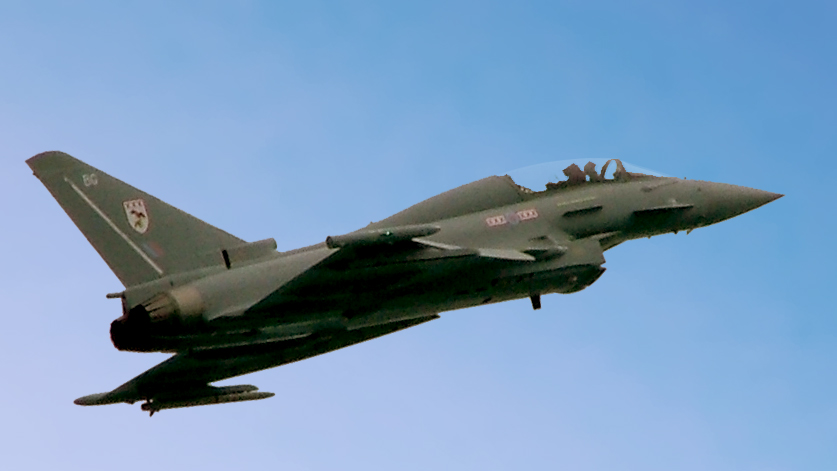
A BAe built Eurofighter development aircraft

==== Airliner/Commercial ====
- BAe Avro 748 – (1960–limited) – (Mid-size turboprop)
- BAe / Hawker Trident – (1964–1995) – (Short-to-medium range; narrow-body jetliner)
- BAe Vickers VC10 – (1964–2013) – (Medium range; narrow-body jetliner & aerial refueler)
- British Aerospace 125 – (1964-limited) – (Mid-size business jet)
- BAe / Handley Page Jetstream – (1967–2011) – (Small-size turboprop)
- BAe / Aerospatiale Concorde – (1969–2003) – (Medium range; narrow-body supersonic jetliner)
- British Aerospace Jetstream 31 – (1980–present) – (Small-size turboprop)
- British Aerospace 146 – (1981–present) – (Short range; narrow-body jetliner. Series: 100, 200, 300 & Avro RJ)
- BAe Hawker 800 – (1983–present) – (Mid-size business jet)
- British Aerospace ATP – (1986–1996) – (Mid-size turboprop)
- British Aerospace Jetstream 41 – (1992–present) – (Small-size turboprop)

==== Trainer ====
- BAe Provost – (1954–1993) – (Basic jet trainer)
- BAe Bulldog – (1969–present) – (Basic piston trainer)
- British Aerospace Hawk – (1974–present) – (Advanced jet trainer)
- BAe / McDonnell Douglas Goshawk – (1988–present) – (Advanced jet trainer)

==== Military ====
- BAe Canberra – (1949–2007) – (Medium bomber)
- Hawker / BAe Hunter – (1951-limited) – (Fighter-bomber)
- BAe Victor – (1952–1993) – (Strategic heavy bomber & aerial refueler)
- BAe Avro Vulcan – (1952–2015) – (Strategic heavy bomber)
- BAe Lightning – (1954–1988) – (Interceptor fighter)
- BAe Buccaneer – (1958–1994) – (Maritime strike fighter)
- BAC/BAe Strikemaster – (1967–1993) – (Attack fighter)
- Hawker / BAe Nimrod – (1967–2011) – (Maritime patrol)
  - Hawker / BAe Nimrod R1 – (1973–2011) – (Reconnaissance)
  - British Aerospace Nimrod AEW.3 – (1980–1986) – (Airborne early warning)
  - BAE Nimrod MRA.4 – (2004) – (Experimental maritime patrol, cancelled)
- Hawker / BAe Harrier – (1967–2006) – (VSTOL fighter)
  - Harrier jump jet – (1967–limited) – (VSTOL fighter)
  - British Aerospace Sea Harrier – (1978–2016) – (VSTOL fighter)
  - British Aerospace Harrier II – (1985–2011) – (VSTOL fighter)
- SEPECAT Jaguar – (1968-limited) – (Attack fighter)
- Panavia Tornado – (1974–present) – (Multirole strike fighter)
  - Panavia Tornado ADV – (1979–2011) – (Interceptor fighter)
- British Aerospace P.125 – (1980s) – (Experimental fighter, cancelled)
- British Aerospace P.1216 – (1980s) – (Experimental fighter, cancelled)
- British Aerospace EAP – (1986) – (Experimental fighter, developed into Eurofighter Typhoon)
- British Aerospace Hawk 200 – (1986–2023) – (Multirole light fighter)
- BAe / Saab Gripen – (1988–2004) – (Multirole fighter, now fully owned by Saab AB)
- Eurofighter Typhoon – (1994–present) – (Air-superiority multirole fighter)
- BAE Replica – (2010s) – (Experimental Fifth Generation fighter, cancelled)
- BAE Systems Tempest – (under development) – (Sixth Generation fighter)

=== Unmanned aerial vehicles ===
- BAe Flybac
- BAE SkyEye
- BAe Stabileye
- BAE Systems Phoenix

=== Missiles ===
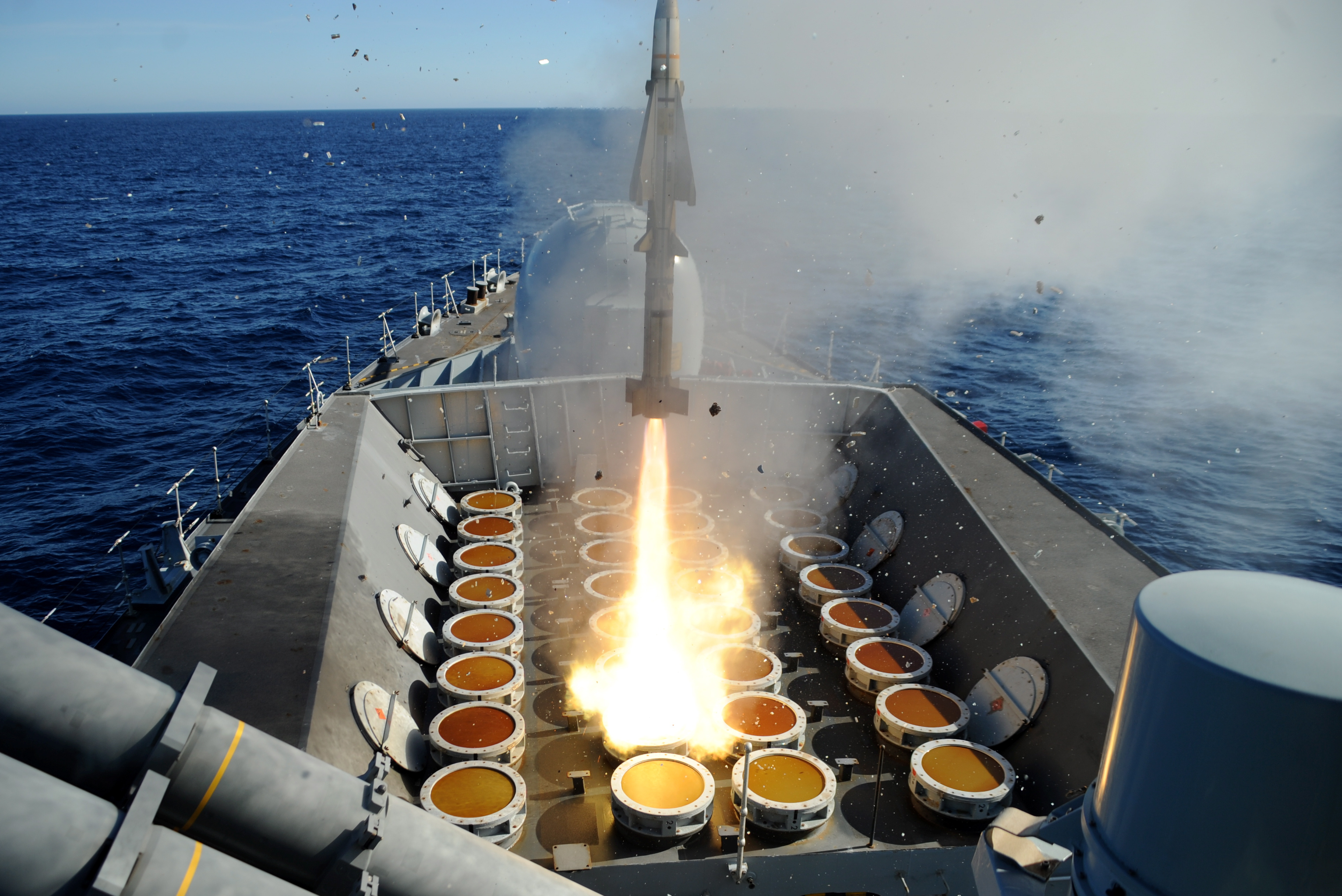
A vertically-launched Sea Wolf

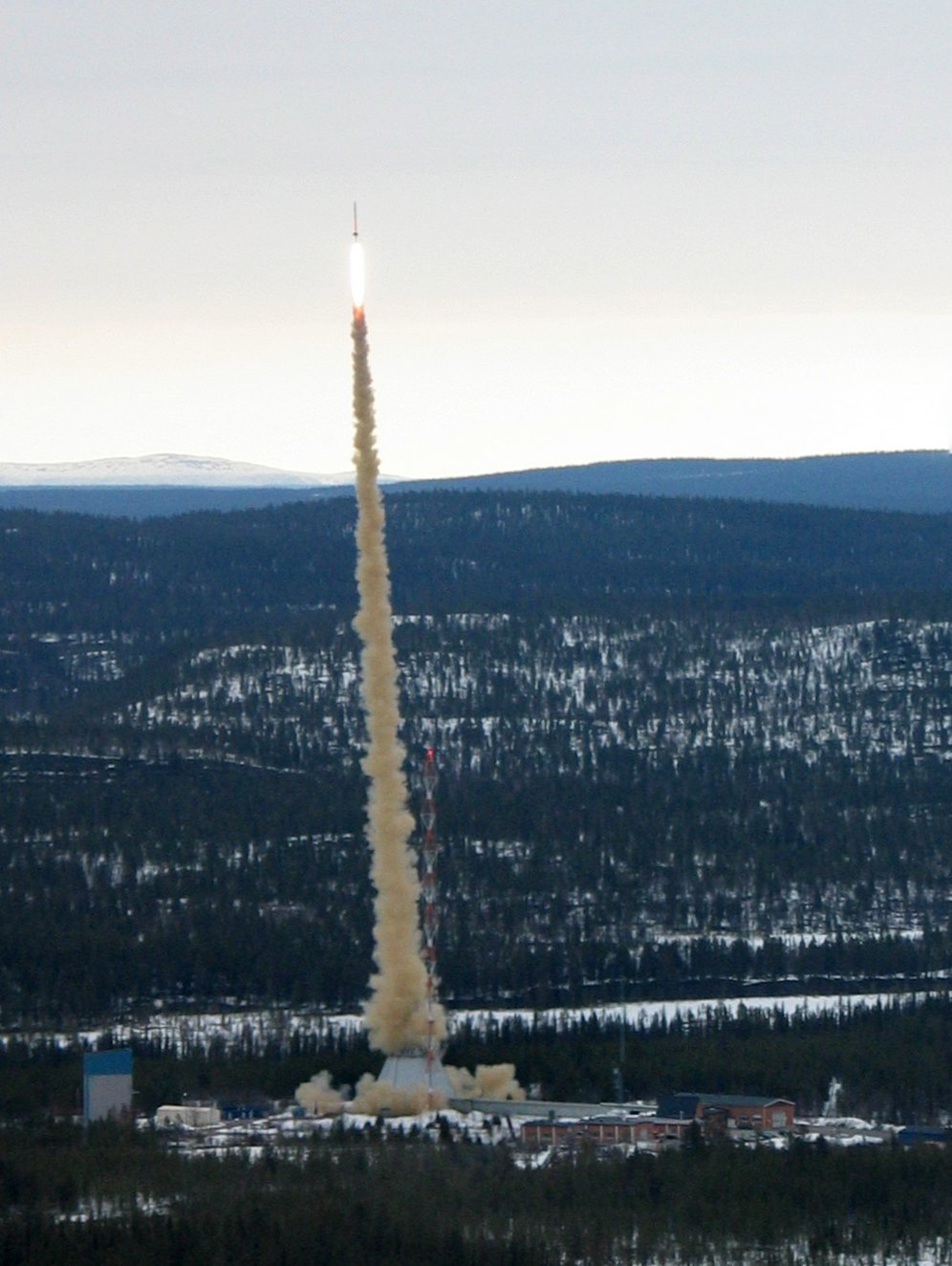
Skylark sounding rocket

- ALARM – (Air-to-surface anti-radiation missile)
- Rapier – (Surface-to-air missile)
- Sea Dart – (Surface-to-air & surface-to-surface missile)
- Sea Eagle – (Surface-to-surface anti-ship missile)
- Sea Skua – (Air-to-surface anti-ship missile)
- Sea Wolf – (Surface-to-air missile)
- Skyflash – (Air-to-air missile)
- Skylark – (Sounding rocket)
- S225XR – (Air-to-air missile, cancelled)

=== Airliner wings ===
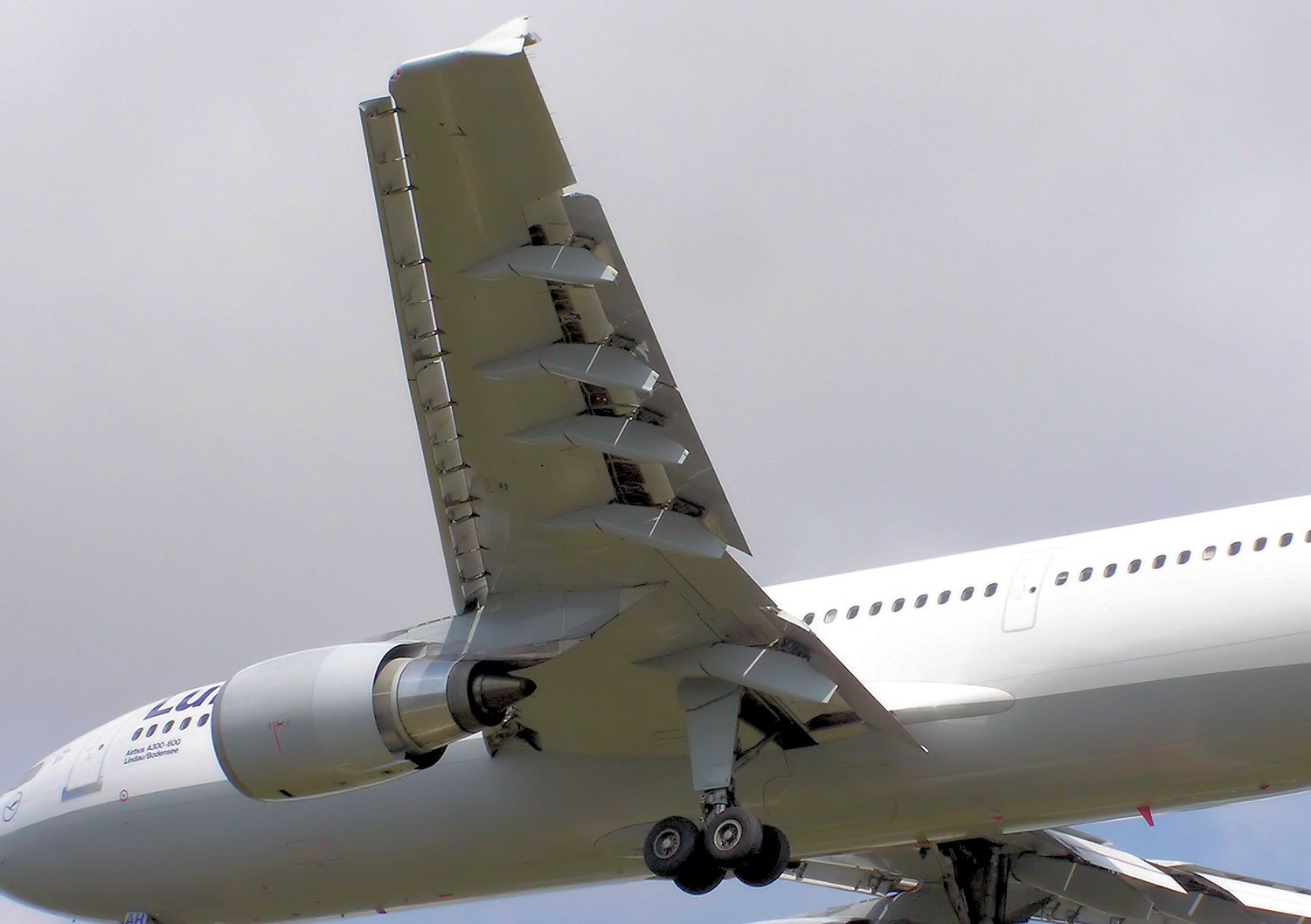
An example of a wing of the first Airbus model, the A300

- Airbus A300
- Airbus A310
- Airbus A320 family
- Airbus A330
- Airbus A340
- Airbus Beluga
- Avion de Transport Supersonique Futur – project

=== Space hardware ===
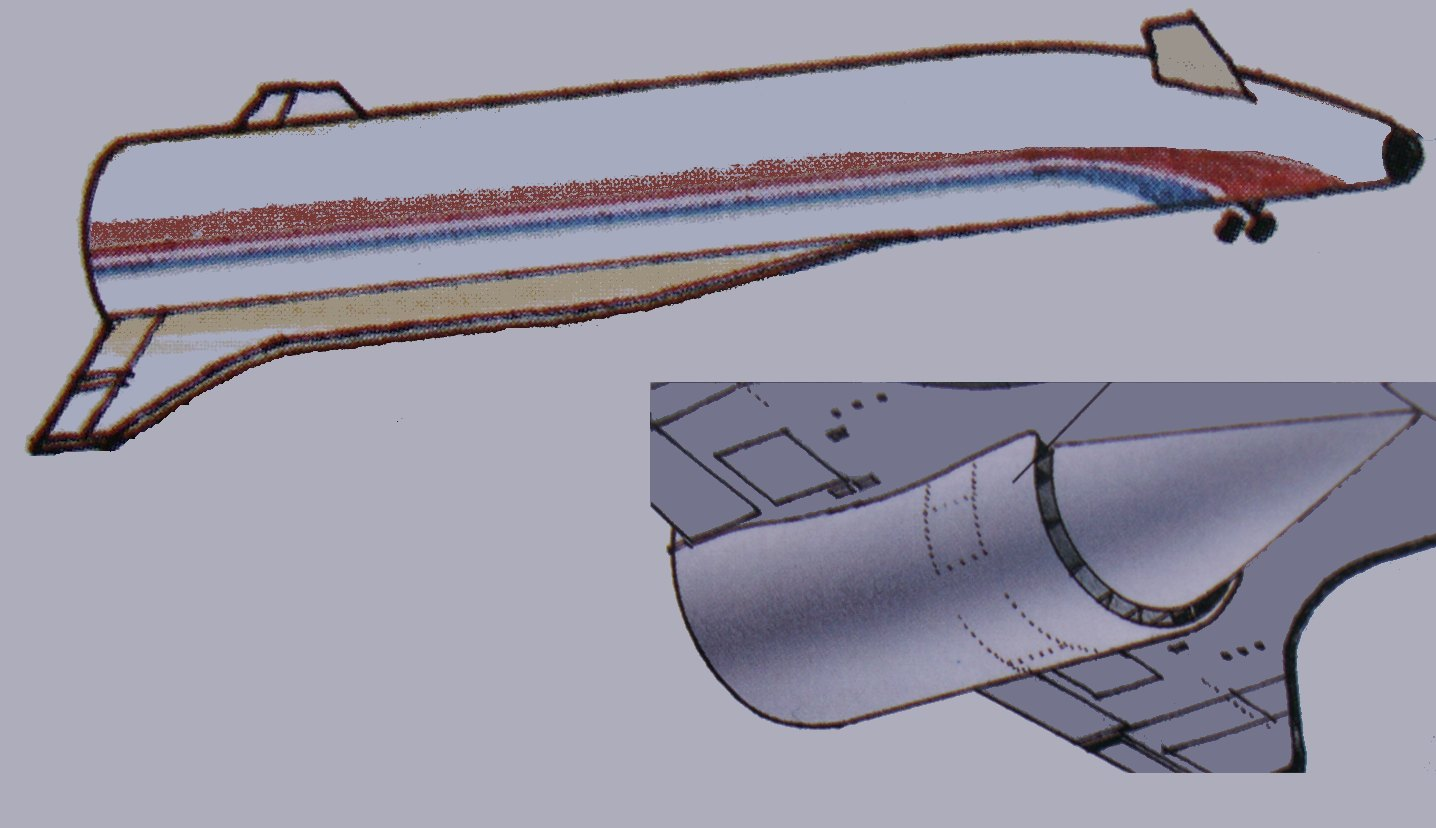
An artist's depiction of HOTOL

- Giotto probe
- HOTOL
- Olympus-1
- Orbital Test Satellite
- Skynet (satellites)

=== Security systems ===
- CONDOR CONtraband DetectOR
- Vehicle Cargo X-Ray Systems

== Corruption investigation and criticisms ==
There have been allegations that the Al Yamamah contracts were a result of bribes ("douceurs") to members of the Saudi royal family and government officials. Some allegations suggested that the former Prime Minister's son Mark Thatcher may have been involved; he has strongly denied receiving payments or exploiting his mother's connections in his business dealings. The National Audit Office investigated the contracts and has so far never released its conclusions – the only NAO report ever to be withheld. The BBC's Newsnight observed that it is ironic that the once classified report analysing the construction of MI5's Thames House and MI6's Vauxhall Cross headquarters has been released, but the Al Yamamah report is still deemed too sensitive.

The 2007 documentary film Welcome Aboard Toxic Airlines contained evidence that vital data was withheld from a 1999–2000 Australian Senate Inquiry into the health and flight safety issues relating to oil fumes on the British Aerospace 146. The film also contains an Australian Senator's speech about money being paid by BAe for silence on the fumes issue.

== See also ==
- Aerospace industry in the United Kingdom
- Hawker Siddeley Company
- Rover Group
