= Sex change =

Sex change may refer to:

== Biology and medicine ==
- Gender-affirming care, health care that helps people to change their physical appearance and/or sex characteristics to accord with their gender identity
  - Gender-affirming hormone therapy, a form of hormone therapy in which sex hormones and other hormonal medications are administered to transgender or gender nonconforming individuals for the purpose of more closely aligning their secondary sexual characteristics with their gender identity
  - Gender-affirming surgery, a surgical procedure, or a series of procedures, that alters a person's physical appearance and sexual characteristics to resemble those associated with their gender identity
- Sequential hermaphroditism, a type of hermaphroditism in which an organism's sex changes at some point in its life

== Other uses ==
- Sex Change (album), a 2007 album by Trans Am

== See also ==
- Gender transition, the process of affirming and expressing internal sense of gender, rather than the sex assigned at birth
- Change of Sex, a 1976 Spanish film
- A Change of Sex, a British television documentary series
