= Red Line (album) =

Studio album by Trans Am
- Released: September 5, 2000
- Studio: National Recording Studio
- Genre: Post-rock
- Length: 73:18
- Label: Thrill Jockey

Trans Am chronology
Futureworld (1999)	Red Line (2000)	TA (2002)

Professional ratings
Review scores
Source	Rating
AllMusic	4.5/5 stars
The Encyclopedia of Popular Music	4/5 stars
The Guardian	3/5 stars
Pitchfork	8.7/10

Red Line is the fifth album by Trans Am, released in 2000.

== Production ==
The album was recorded at the band's National Recording Studio. The track "Let's Take The Fresh Step Together" uses a timestretched sample of the default Windows 98 startup sound. Ian Svenonius guests on "Ragged Agenda".

== Critical reception ==
Trouser Press called the album "a sprawling career summary of Trans Am’s myriad obsessions," writing that "the trio stretches out on ambient mood-pieces like the baffling 'Village in Bubbles' and the psychedelic, spacious noise of 'For Now and Forever'." The New York Times wrote that the band "has finally embraced free-form rock with a beat rather than derivative kitsch." SF Weekly thought that "overall the album is a success—dark at times, frenetic at others, but always covered in a sticky layer of garage-sale gunk."

== Track listing ==
All songs written by Trans Am (Philip Manley, Nathan Means, Sebastian Thomson) unless noted:

1. "Let's Take the Fresh Step Together"
2. "I Want It All"
3. "Casual Friday"
4. "Polizei (Zu spät)"
5. "Village in Bubbles"
6. "For Now and Forever"
7. "Play in the Summer"
8. "Where Do You Want to Fuck Today?"
9. "Don't Bundle Me"
10. "Mr. Simmons"
11. "Diabolical Cracker"
12. "I'm Coming Down"
13. "The Dark Gift"
14. "Air and Space"
15. "Talk You All Tight"
16. "Lunar Landing"
17. "Bad Cat"
18. "Slow Response"
19. "Getting Very Nervous"
20. "Ragged Agenda" (Ian Svenonius, Trans Am)
21. "Shady Groove"

=== Japan release extra tracks ===
1. "Ragged Agenda (Spivvy Nice Mix)"
2. "Grooveship Heights"
3. "Shady Groove (Good Cat Mix)"
