= TA (album) =

Studio album by Trans Am
- Released: May 7, 2002
- Genre: Post-Rock
- Length: 47:50
- Label: Thrill Jockey
- Producer: John McEntire and Trans Am

Trans Am chronology
Red Line (2000)	TA (2002)	Liberation (2004)

Professional ratings
Review scores
Source	Rating
AllMusic	2.5/5 stars
Pitchfork Media	3.5/10

TA is the sixth album by Trans Am, released in 2002.

== Track listing ==
1. Cold War - 4:16
2. Molecules - 3:03
3. Run With Me - 3:48
4. Bonn - 2:55
5. Basta - 1:36
6. Different Kind of Love - 3:42
7. You Will Be There - 3:12
8. Derek Fisher - 0:32
9. Party Station - 3:56
10. Positive People - 3:53
11. Afternight - 4:34
12. C Sick - 5:13
13. Feed On Me - 3:33
14. Infinite Wavelength - 3:37
