= Future (train) =

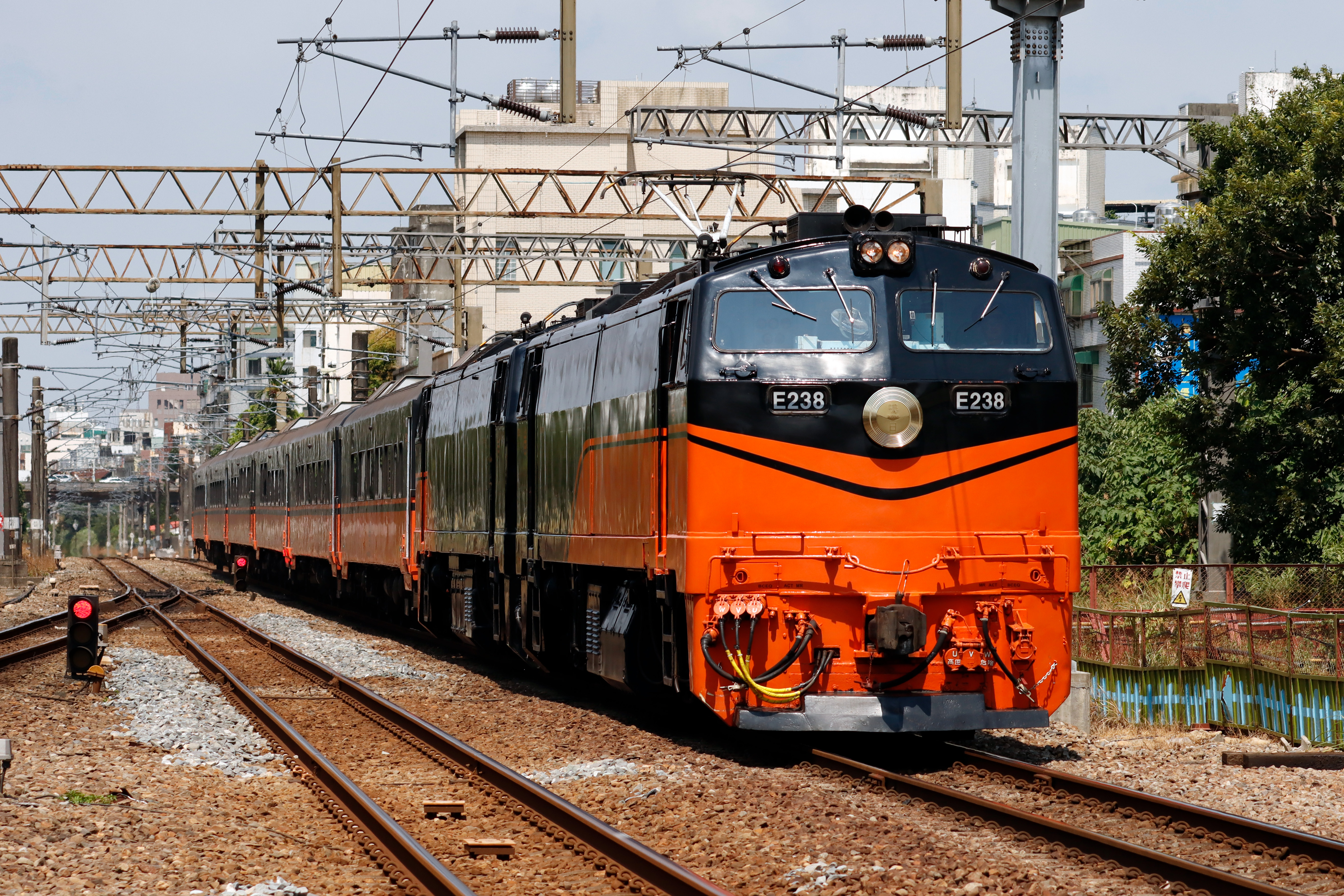
- Future passenger cars with the "sunset" livery

Overview
- Service type: Excursion train
- Status: Reservation only
- First service: 31 December 2020
- Current operator(s): Taiwan Railway

On-board services
- Class(es): Business class only
- Sleeping arrangements: None
- Catering facilities: On-board café
- Baggage facilities: Overhead racks

Technical
- Track gauge: 1,067 mm (3 ft 6 in)
- Operating speed: 110 km/h

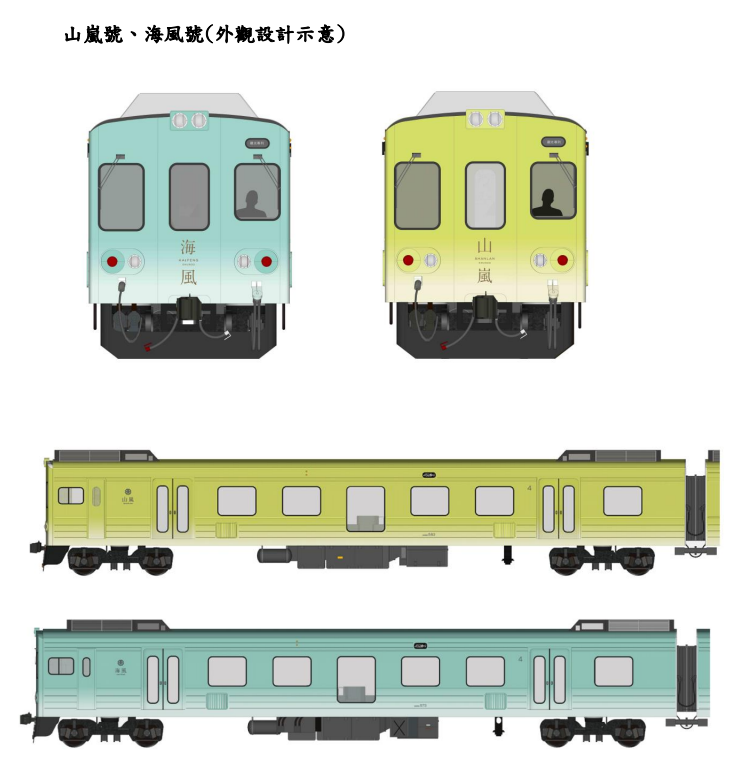
Future passenger cars with the "ocean" and "mountains" livery Schematic diagram

The Future (Chinese: 鳴日號; pinyin: Míngrìhào) is an excursion train operated by Taiwan Railway (TR) that is composed of refurbished Chu-Kuang Express rolling stock. As of November 2020, the train only operates if reserved in advance. The Future began services on 31 December 2020.

== History ==
In February 2019, the Taiwan Railways Administration (TRA) introduced a newly refurbished excursion train to be used for round-island train services, with plans to complete a total of 29 cars. However, the public's reception to these cars were poor: some critics described its interior design as "unappealing" and "hideous". Some of these cars were further remodeled with a theme based around Hello Kitty, which were better received. Meanwhile, the TRA's director-general, Chang Chen-yuan, created a committee in April of "the harshest critics of the train" and allotted 13 not-yet refurbished cars to JC Architecture (柏成設計), a Taiwanese design firm, for redesign.

On 26 November 2019, the TRA announced that they are unveiling three new trainsets, each with its own theme: mountains (山景), ocean (海景), and sunset (夕景). Two days later, the first group of "sunset" themed cars rolled out of Taiwan Rolling Stock Company's plant in Hukou, Hsinchu. Between 13-22 December 2019, TRA held an exhibition in Taipei Station unveiling the design of the train, which was seen as a much better improvement. The train was recognized in the 2020 Good Design Award in Japan.

== Design ==
Thirteen cars were refurbished for the sunset-themed Future: five 10500 series, five 10600 series, and three 10700 series cars. Out of these trains, two are dining cars, three are lounge cars, and eight are passenger cars. The exterior of the "sunset" train is painted in black and orange, a color scheme never used by the TRA before. Faced with a limited budget, the designers left the general layout of the train the same. Less vibrant colors were used for a minimalistic approach. The designers intended on making all seats white, but the TRA had already purchased blue seats for its original excursion train design; therefore, only a third of the seats are white.

== Operation ==
The Future has no regular timetable; instead, the train is only used if reserved, either through TR or through package tours offered by third party tour operators. Future began services on 31 December 2020.

== Gallery ==
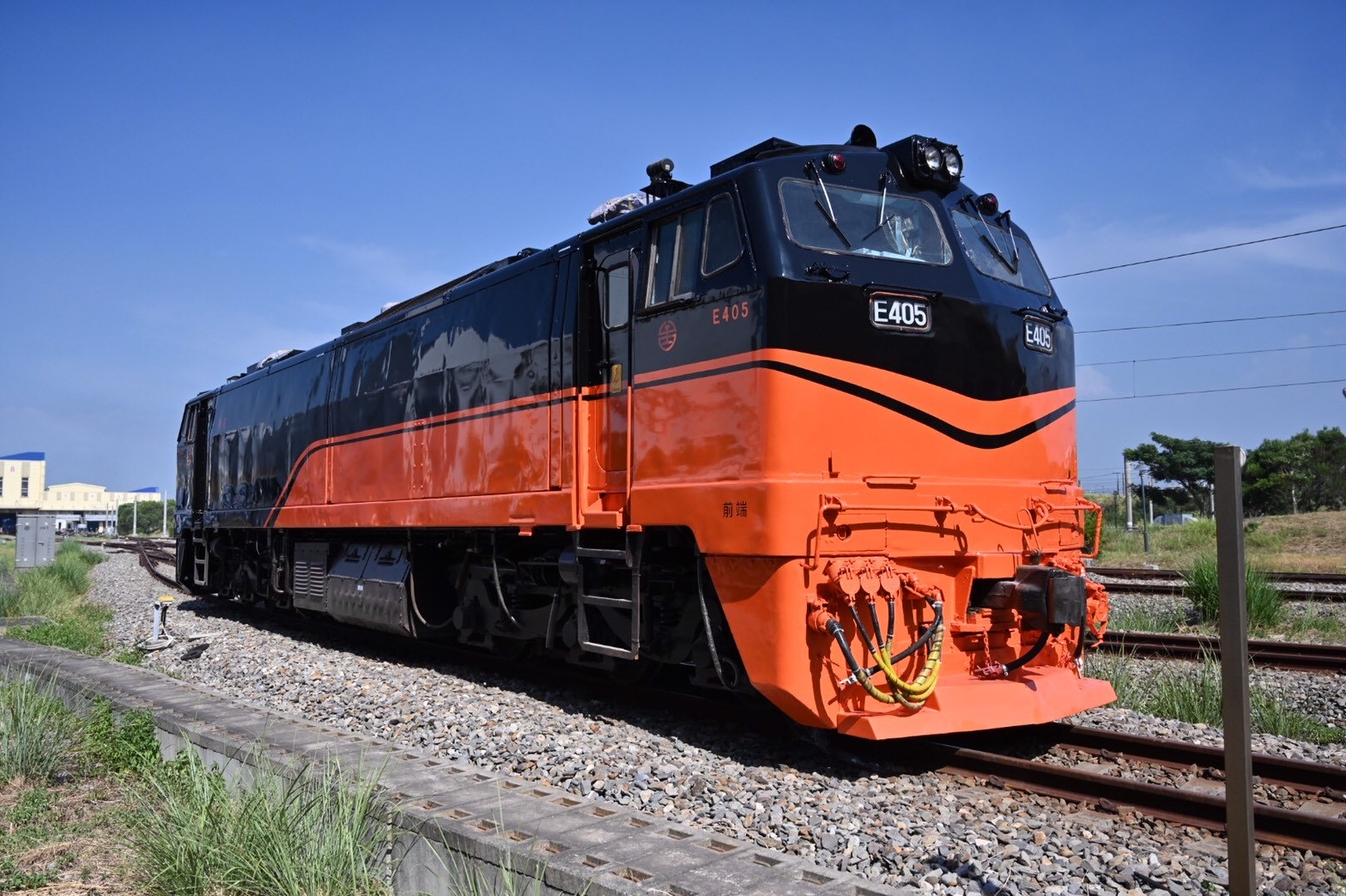
Front of E405

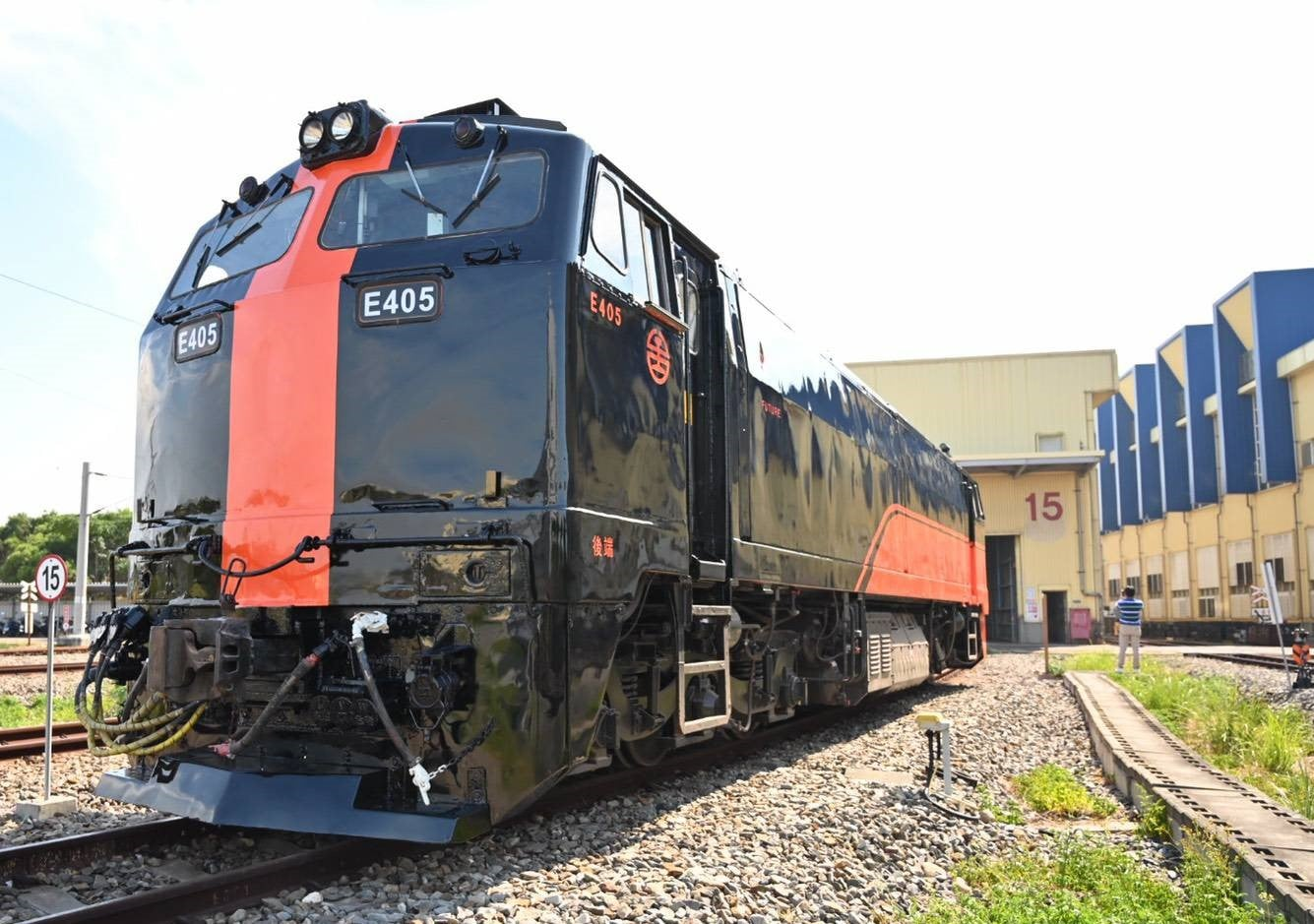
Back of E405

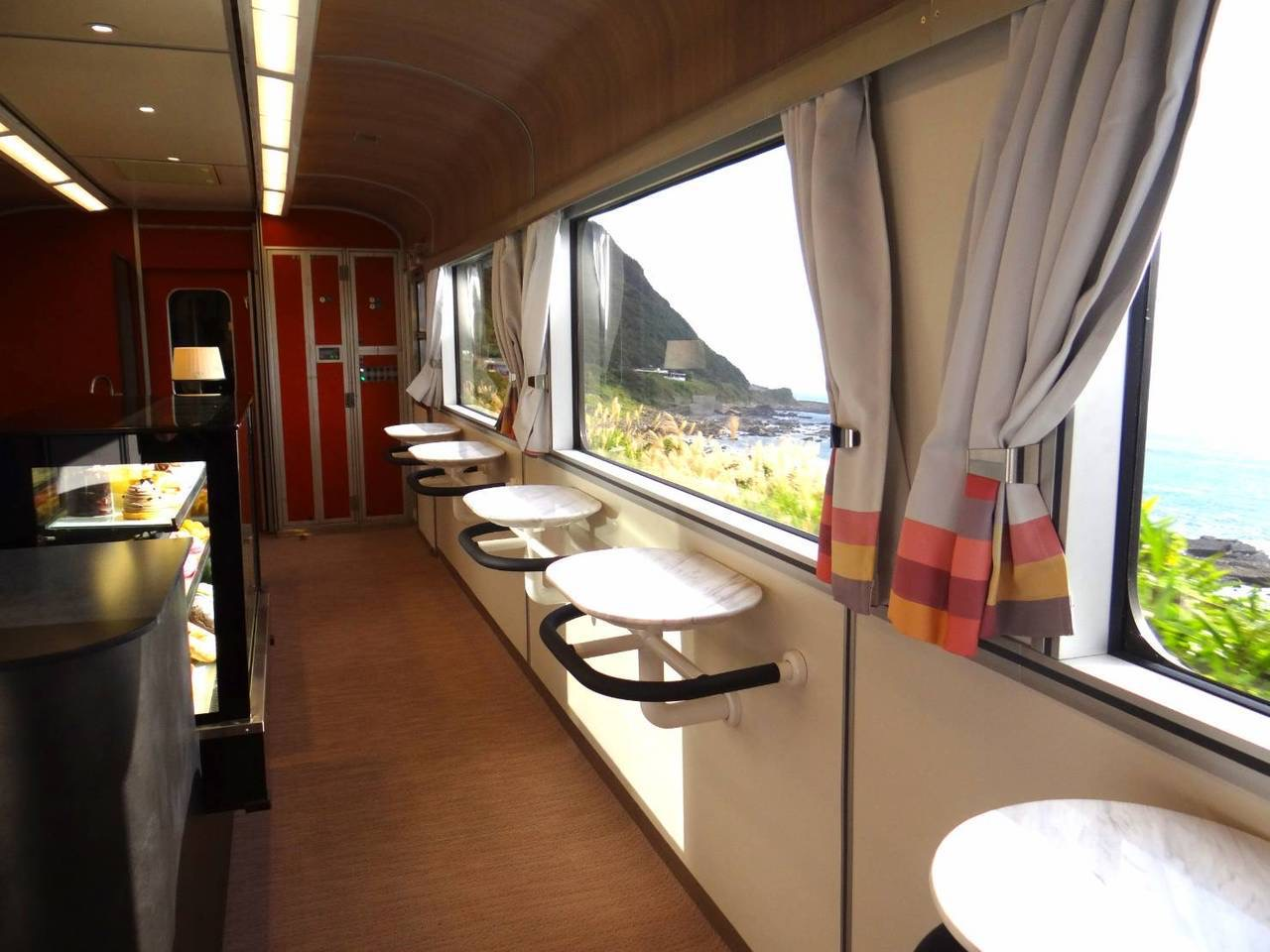
Dining car window

Dining car bar

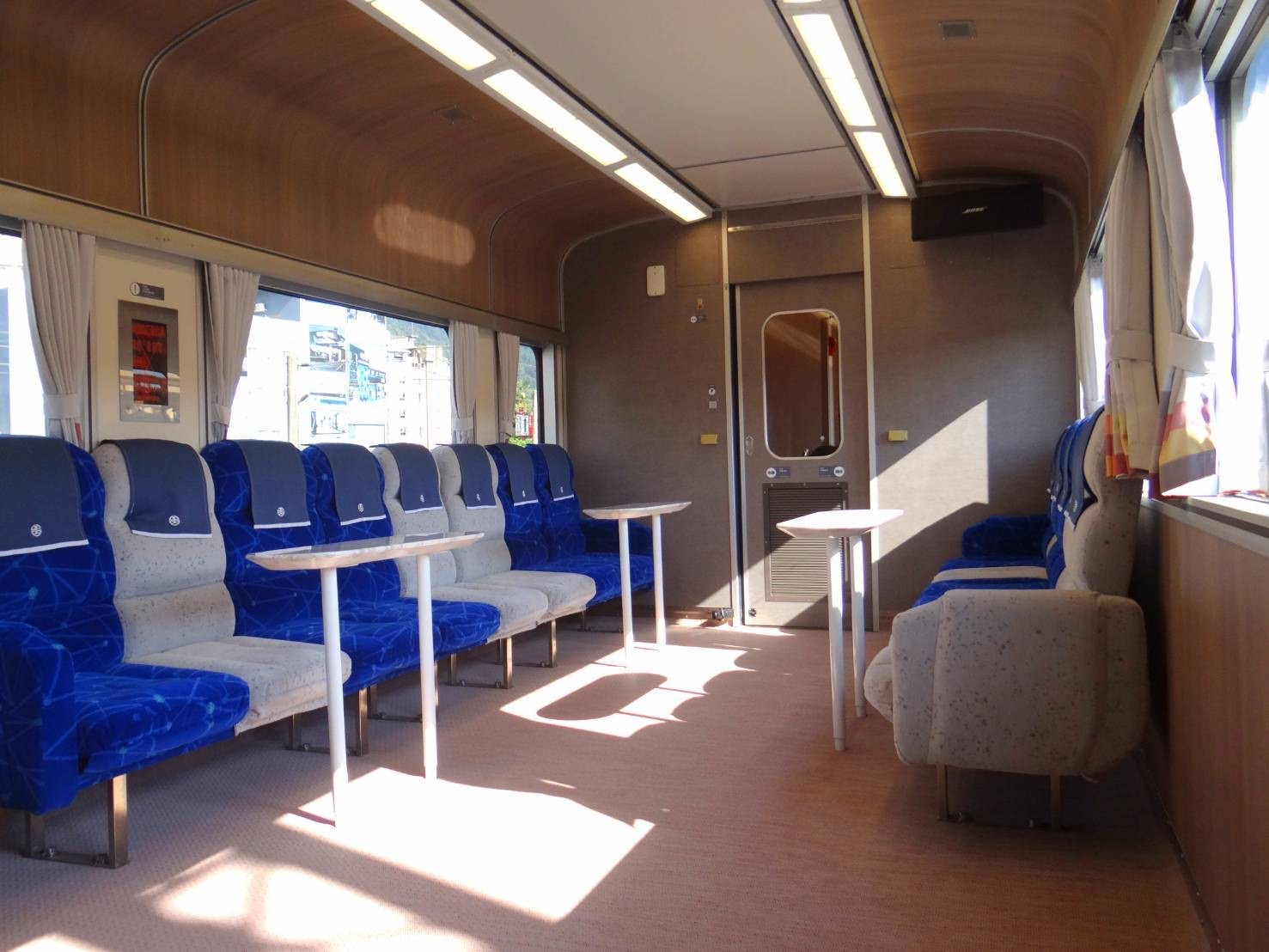
Lounge car
