= Viitorul (disambiguation) =

Viitorul is a Romanian word signifying "the future". On its own, it may refer to Viitorul, a daily political newspaper, or to any of the following football clubs:

- AS Viitorul Axintele
- Viitorul București
- FC Viitorul Constanța
- FC Viitorul II Constanța
- CS Viitorul Dăești
- CSO Viitorul Darabani
- CS Viitorul Ianca
- CS Viitorul Minerul Lupeni
- FC Viitorul Orhei
- Viitorul Scornicești
- Viitorul Șelimbăr
- Viitorul Suceava
- ACS Viitorul Târgu Jiu
- AS Viitorul Vaslui

== See also ==
- Stadionul Viitorul (disambiguation)
