= British Aerospace P.1216 =

Type of aircraft

P.1216
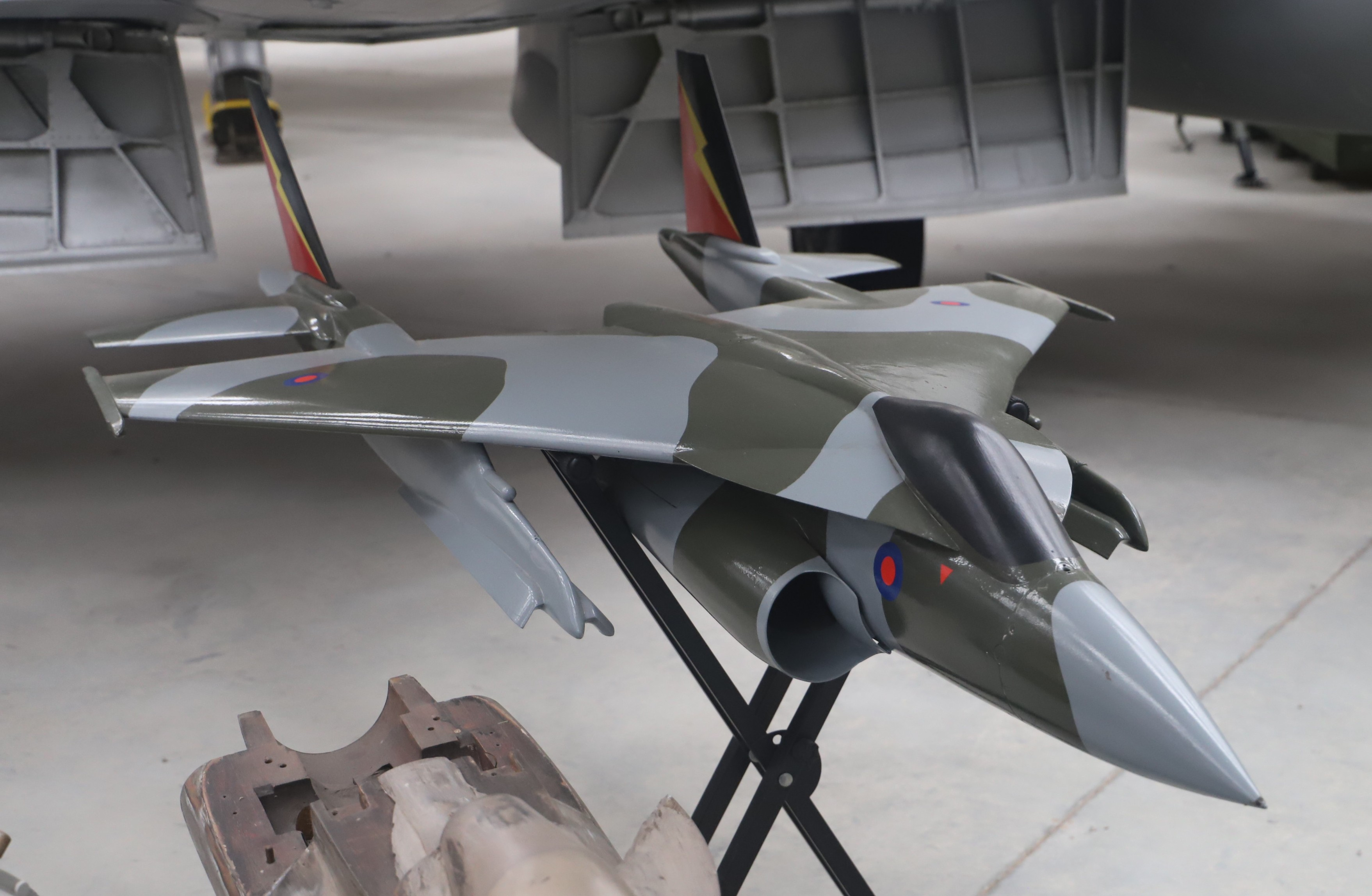
- Model of the British Aerospace P.1216 at Newark Air Museum

General information
- Type: Supersonic advanced short take-off/vertical landing
- National origin: United Kingdom
- Manufacturer: British Aerospace

The British Aerospace (BAe) P.1216 was a planned Advanced Short Take Off/Vertical Landing (ASTOVL) supersonic aircraft from the 1980s. It was designed by the former Hawker design team at Kingston upon Thames, Surrey, England that created the Harrier family of aircraft.

The P.1216 was planned to be powered by a plenum chamber burning (PCB) equipped vectored thrust engine. This used three swivelling engine nozzles rather than the four used in the Harrier. The project was most notable for its use of a twin boom layout in place of a single rear fuselage.

== Background ==
Beginning in 1957 with the P.1127 the former Hawker design team at Kingston upon Thames undertook numerous studies into V/STOL aircraft. these studies identified that the best option was thrust vectoring using rotating engine nozzles. To obtain supersonic flight the design team concluded that plenum chamber burning (PCB) was the most thermodynamically efficient means of obtaining the necessary thrust augmentation. PCB was developed for the vectored thrust Bristol Siddeley BS100 engine for the Hawker Siddeley P.1154 and obtained the additional thrust by burning additional fuel in a turbofan's cold bypass air, instead of the combined cold and hot gas flows as in a conventional afterburning engine.

== Design and development ==
The problem with using PCB was that its thrust developed considerably more heat, noise and thrust induced vibrations compared with that produced in the Harrier. As a result, the rear fuselage configuration employed on the Harrier was not suitable.

Beginning in 1980 the design team began investigating possible solutions. By removing as much of the rear of the airframe as proposed in the preceding P.1212 and P.1214 designs they developed a small short fuselage with twin booms which removed the tailplanes from being directly in the path of the engine's exhaust. A similar solution to the three-nozzle problem was adopted in the later Yakovlev Yak-141 prototype supersonic VTOL interceptor.

The configuration allowed for two nozzles at the front and a single 90-degree rotating rear exhaust which was more efficient than having to split it into the twin rear nozzles used on the Harrier. The booms provided a low drag location for the carrying of cannons in the front as well as missiles and avionics, while also shielding the jet exhausts from heat seeking missiles. Instead of the Pegasus engine whose design dated back to the 1950s the design used the Rolls-Royce RB.422.48 with PCB fitted only on the front nozzles. The design allowed the engine to be removed without needing to remove the wing as on the Harrier. To reduce weight the airframe was to use lithium-based aluminium alloys, superplastic-formed diffusion-bonded titanium and carbon-fibre composites. The booms had all-moving fins and differential tailplanes.

The P.1216 was extensively tested in model form during the 1980s, and a full-scale mock-up was viewed by British Prime Minister Margaret Thatcher during a visit to BAe's Kingston factory in December 1982.

In 1984 they assembled in a test rig at Shoeburyness a Harrier airframe created from the damaged remains of T.Mk.2 XW264 and GR.Mk.1 XV798 to assist in their investigations in the effects of PCB.

The project was extant from 1980 to 1988 and showed promise with only some hot gas recirculation issues having been identified. It was identified that the design offered the possibility of vectoring in forward flight (VIFF) which would allow large longitudinal decelerations thus making it a superior air combat fighter. However issues with the use of PCB, jet nozzle to airframe interference and control of the jet nozzles needed further investigation.

The P.1216 was intended to meet Royal Air Force and Royal Navy requirements for an ASTOVL aircraft, as well as a possible sale to the United States Marine Corps. All these customers subsequently developed the F-35B.

== Specifications (P.1216-6) ==
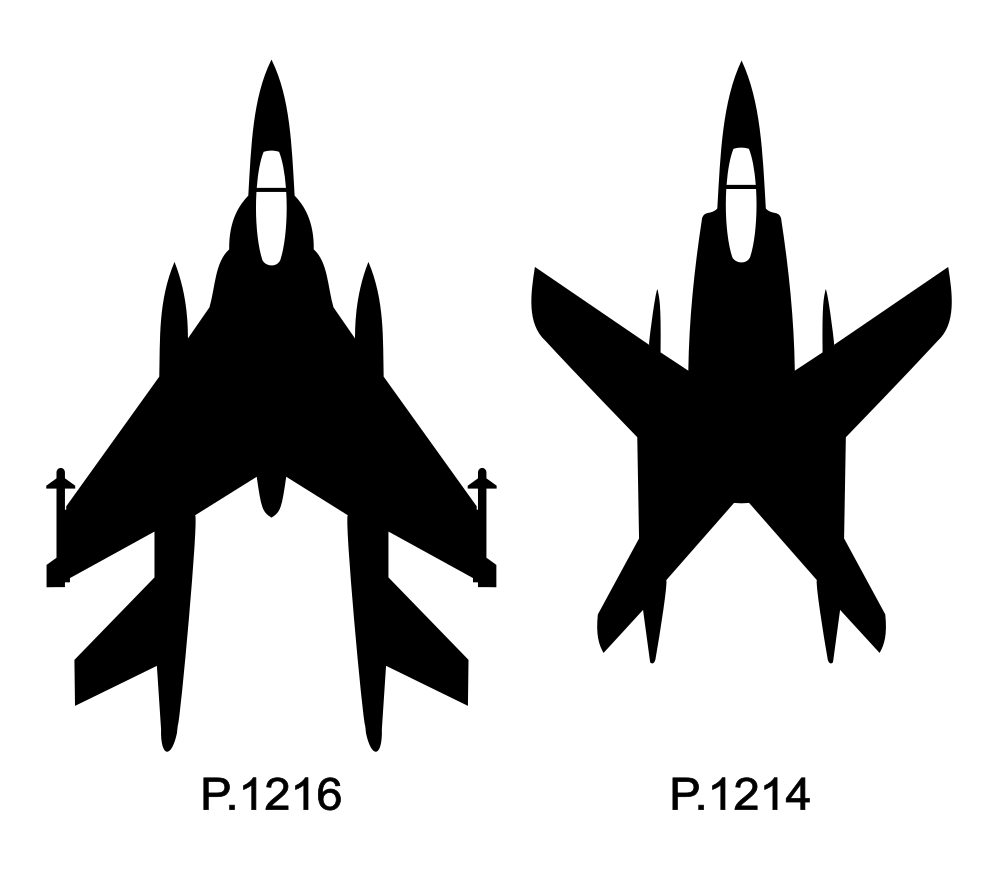
Plan-view silhouettes the P.1214 and P.1216 concepts

Data from British Secret Projects : Jet Fighters since 1950 ( 2nd edition)

General characteristics

- Crew: 1
- Length: 55 ft 10.5 in (17.031 m)
- Wingspan: 34 ft 9 in (10.59 m)
- Wing area: 427 sq ft (39.7 m^{2})
- Gross weight: 35,289 lb (16,007 kg)
- Powerplant: 1 × Rolls-Royce RB.422.48 turbofan with three vectoring nozzles, 25,500 lbf (113 kN) thrust

Performance

- Maximum speed: Mach 1.25 at sea level

Mach 1.7 at 36,090 ft (11,000 m)
Mach 0.9 to 1.38 in 90 seconds at 36,090 ft (11,000 m)

Armament

- Guns: 2 × 27 mm (1.063 in) Mauser cannon
- Hardpoints: At least 4
- Missiles:

- 2 × AIM-9 Sidewinder and 2 × British Aerospace Skyflash

or

- 4 × AIM-9 Sidewinder and/or laser-guided bombs.

- Bombs:

- 6 x iron bombs

or

- 6 x BL755 cluster bombs

== See also ==
- Harrier jump jet / Hawker Siddeley Harrier
- Hawker Siddeley P.1154
- Hawker Siddeley P.1017
