= Futures =

Futures may mean:

== Finance ==
- Futures contract, a tradable financial derivatives contract
- Futures exchange, a financial market where futures contracts are traded
- Modern Trader, formerly Futures, an American finance magazine

== Music ==
- Futures (album), a 2004 album released by Jimmy Eat World
  - "Futures" (song), a single from the above album
- Futures (band), a London-based rock band

== Social sciences ==
- Futures studies, multidisciplinary studies of patterns to determine the likelihood of future trends
- Futures (journal), an academic journal covering futures studies

== Sports ==
- Futures Tour, official developmental golf tour of the Ladies Professional Golf Association (LPGA)
- Futures tennis tournaments

== Other uses ==
- Futures, artist name used by Futures Church, an Australian megachurch, for producing their music
- Futures and promises, two of several constructs used for high-level synchronization mechanisms in some computer programming languages

== See also ==
- Future (disambiguation)
- Futures of American Studies, a summer institute in American Studies at Dartmouth College
