= Trans Am (album) =

Studio album by Trans Am
- Released: January 30, 1996
- Genre: Post-rock
- Length: 29:59
- Label: Thrill Jockey
- Producers: John McEntire, Trans Am

Trans Am chronology
Trans Am (1996)	Surrender to the Night (1997)

Trans Am is the debut album by the American band Trans Am, released on January 30, 1996, by Thrill Jockey Records. The band supported the album with a North American tour.

== Music ==
The material on Trans Am has been characterized as "big dumb rock (of the tongue-in-cheek variety)" by Sean Cooper of AllMusic. The instrumentation is considered to be technical. Some of the guitar licks have drawn comparisons to Foreigner and Boston.

== Artwork ==
The album's artwork was taken from the cover of a 10" flexi disc Space Sounds, which was part of Our Universe Space Kit, published by the National Geographic Society in 1980.

== Critical reception ==
Professional ratings
Review scores
Source	Rating
AllMusic	3.5/5 stars
Alternative Press	4/5 stars

The Chicago Tribune labeled the album "instrumentals that blend traditional rock-trio interaction with angular electronic effects." Guitar Player deemed it a "musicianly spacerock meltdown—replete with Moog blasts and other rich analog synth washes." Sean Cooper of AllMusic wrote: "Absent the irony this would be an absolutely horrendous record, but kept in mind it's an enjoyable, if somewhat expendable listen."

== Track listing ==
1. Ballbados – 3:28
2. Enforcer – 1:31
3. Technology Corridor – 0:50
4. Trans Am – 2:21
5. (interlude) – 0:33
6. Firepoker – 3:09
7. A Single Ray of Light on an Otherwise Cloudy Day – 1:30
8. Prowler – 1:43
9. Orlando – 4:41
10. Love Affair – 1:21
11. American Kooter – 8:49

Japanese release extra tracks

1. American Kooter
2. Simulacrum
3. Man-Machine
4. Illegal Ass
5. Koln
6. Randy Groove
7. Now You Die, Thriddle Fool
8. Star Jammer
9. Strong Sensations
