= Tomorrowland =

Tomorrowland may refer to:

== Arts, entertainment, and media ==
- Tomorrowland (Disney Parks), a theme land at a number of Disney theme parks around the world
- Tomorrowland (festival), an annual electronic dance music festival in Boom, Belgium
- Tomorrowland (film), a 2015 science fiction film directed by Brad Bird
- Tomorrowland (book), a 2015 non-fiction book by Steven Kotler
- "Tomorrowland" (Mad Men), an episode of Mad Men
- Tomorrowland (Black Majesty album), 2007
- Tomorrowland (Ryan Bingham album), 2012

== Other uses ==
- Tomorrowland Terrace, a restaurant in Tomorrowland at Disneyland in Anaheim, California, and also in Magic Kingdom at Walt Disney World in Bay Lake, Florida
- Tomorrowland Speedway, a race car track attraction in Tomorrowland in Magic Kingdom at Walt Disney World Resort in Bay Lake, Florida
- Tomorrowland Transit Authority PeopleMover, an urban mass transit PeopleMover system attraction in Tomorrowland in Magic Kingdom at the Walt Disney World Resort in Bay Lake, Florida

== See also ==
- The World Tomorrow (disambiguation)
- Tomorrow's World (disambiguation)
