= Futur =

Futur is the French word for future.

It may also refer to:

== French grammar ==
- Futur proche
- Futur simple

== Persons ==
- Woldai Futur, politician and minister in Eritrea

== Music ==
- Futur (album), 2012 album of Booba
- Futur 2.0, 2013 album of Booba
- Futur 80, cancelled album of French singer Leslie

== See also ==
- Future
- Avion de Transport Supersonique Futur
