= The World Tomorrow =

The World Tomorrow or World Tomorrow can refer to:

- World Tomorrow, 2012 political talk show, hosted by Julian Assange
- The World Tomorrow (radio and television), Christian radio and television program
- The World Tomorrow (magazine), American political magazine, 1918–1934

== See also ==
- SciTech - Our World Tomorrow, a TV series
- World of Tomorrow (disambiguation)
- Tomorrow's World (disambiguation)
- Future World (disambiguation)
- Tomorrowland (disambiguation)
