= Trans Am (band) =

American rock band

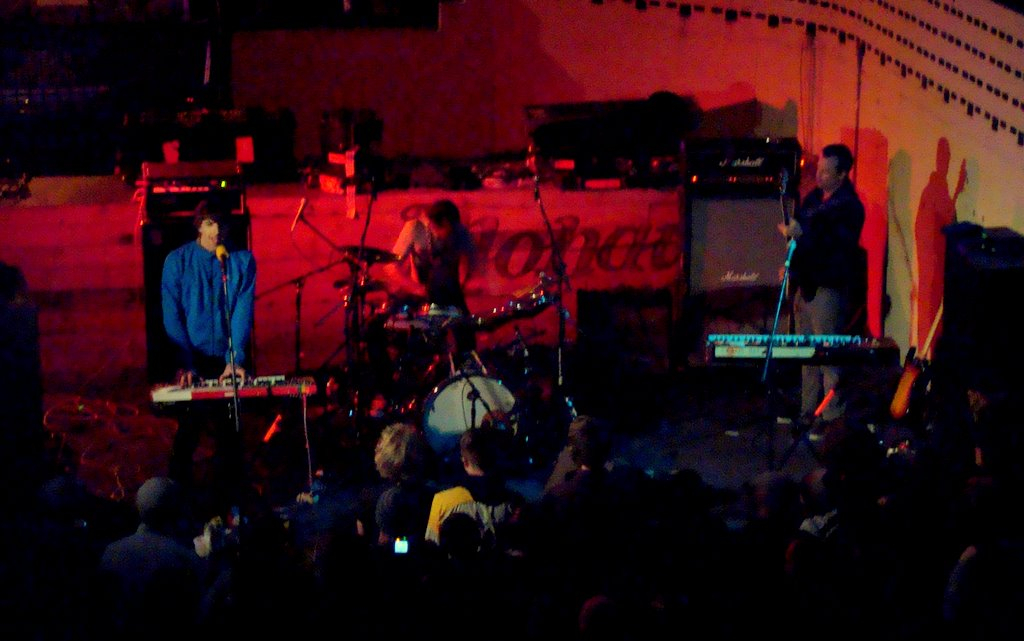
- Trans Am performing in 2007

Background information
- Origin: Bethesda, Maryland, U.S.
- Genres: Post-rock; indie rock
- Years active: 1990–present
- Labels: Thrill Jockey; Low Transit Industries
- Members: Nathan Means; Philip Manley; Sebastian Thomson

Trans Am is a three-piece American band from Bethesda, Maryland, that was one of the originators of "post-rock" in the mid-1990s. Their work combines elements of Krautrock, heavy metal, hardcore punk, synthpop, electronic music, and folk music. Since their inception, the group has toured with Tortoise, Pan Sonic, the Fucking Champs, and Tool.

== History ==
Trans Am was formed in 1990, originally as a "long-distance band" put together by University of North Carolina at Chapel Hill student Nathan Means (bass, keyboards, vocoder, vocals), Oberlin College student Philip Manley (lead guitar, bass, keyboards, vocals), and Bard College student Sebastian Thomson (drums, bass, keyboards, guitar, vocals). The band members moved to Maryland after graduating.

Initially influenced by local hardcore and post-hardcore bands Fugazi, Bad Brains, and Soulside, Trans Am quickly moved away from that sound and began drawing from such bands as Chrome, This Heat, Van Halen, Manowar, and in particular electronica acts such as Kraftwerk, Aphex Twin, and Autechre. According to Thomson, they had searched for a unique sound and "were floundering until one day we hooked up a Casio keyboard in 1993 and realized that a keyboard can also be a punk instrument." Sometime around 1993, Trans Am had a lead singer, who was eventually fired for missing rehearsals, and the band opted not to replace him. Since then, Trans Am's music has been largely instrumental.

The band's self-titled debut was produced by John McEntire of labelmates Tortoise at Idful Music Corporation, in Chicago. Afterwards, Trans Am opened for Tortoise on a brief US tour. In 1996, they released a self-titled EP, which showed a greater reliance on electronics. The group expanded that approach to album length on Surrender to the Night (1997) and The Surveillance (1998). Their sound during this period was reminiscent of such acts as Kraftwerk, Can, and New Order, interspersed with more rock-oriented material. Also in 1996, they appeared on a split single with Wingtip Sloat. One track from that record, "Starjammer", was later included on the electronica label Mille Plateaux's double-CD compilation In Memoriam Gilles Deleuze. Around the time of the release of The Surveillance, Trans Am started to perform material with vocoder-heavy vocals by Nathan Means.

Their fourth album, Futureworld, came out in 1999. The first side of this album featured songs with vocoder and the second side had all instrumentals, including the sprightly "Cocaine Computer". A music video for the title song was filmed and released. In 2000, the group followed up with the double album Red Line, recorded in their own National Recording Studio. A rarities collection, You Can Always Get What You Want, was also released that year.

In 2002, Trans Am released TA, complete with tongue-in-cheek promo photos featuring the band in boy band-esque matching white outfits. TA's cover art was a parody of a REO Speedwagon best-of collection. Though the album was essentially a spoof of the electroclash genre, it was mostly panned by music critics.

During the 2004 U.S. election year, Trans Am released Liberation, an album that questioned the George W. Bush presidency and addressed such issues as the 2003 invasion of Iraq, the war on terror, propaganda, and paranoia.

Sex Change, the band's sixth studio album, was released in 2007. Following the release, Trans Am did a tour of the United States with Zombi and The Psychic Paramount, seventeen shows opening for Tool, and they played the Thrill Jockey 15th anniversary show in Chicago, Illinois.

Also in 2007, Trans Am contributed to the soundtrack of the video game After Burner: Black Falcon for the PSP.

In April 2017, Trans Am released California Hotel, an eight-song album on Thrill Jockey.

== Discography ==
=== Studio albums ===
- Trans Am (1996)
- Surrender to the Night (1997)
- The Surveillance (1998)
- Futureworld (1999)
- Red Line (2000)
- TA (2002)
- Liberation (2004)
- Sex Change (2007)
- Thing (2010)
- Volume X (2014)
- California Hotel (2017)

=== EPs, singles ===
- Trans Am – 7" split with Thigh Mastersson (1996)
- Tuba Frenzy – 12" split with Wingtip Sloat (1996)
- Illegal Ass – 12" (1996)
- Who Do We Think You Are? – Australian Tour EP (1999)
- You Can Always Get What You Want – rarities compilation (2000)
- Extremixxx – remixe EP (2002)

=== Live albums ===
- What Day Is It Tonight? – Trans Am Live 1993–2008 2xLP + DVD limited to 1,500 copies (2009)

=== with the Fucking Champs ===
- Double Exposure recorded as TransChamps (2001)
- Gold recorded as the Fucking Am (2004)

== See also ==
- Life Coach – solo album by Phil Manley
