= Stadionul Viitorul =

Stadionul Viitorul may refer to two Romanian stadiums.

- Stadionul Viitorul (Ovidiu)
- Stadionul Viitorul (Scornicești)
