= Avion de Transport Supersonique Futur =

Aircraft concept

The Avion de Transport Supersonique Futur (ATSF) also known as Alliance, was a concept design for supersonic transport developed by British Aerospace and Aérospatiale together. The aircraft was to be based on the experience learned from the supersonic Concorde, and was to fly at a top speed of roughly Mach 2. Preliminary designs were produced, with some wind-tunnel testing of small-scale models, but development apparently stalled in the early 2000s.

== History ==
By the mid-1980s, it was recognised that Concorde, the first long-serving supersonic transport, had achieved a niche level of profitability on the busiest Transatlantic routes, but that the airliner had not attracted the widespread use that had been hoped, in part due to political complications and poor economic situation following the 1973 oil crisis. Furthermore, during this era, various organisations were undertaking projects, such as the National Aero-Space Plane in the United States, which were aimed at competing with Concorde as next generation supersonic transports. Some political figures, such as US President Ronald Reagan, were outspokenly optimistic on the topic, and directed funding to such ventures; accordingly, several aerospace companies, not least Concorde's manufacturers, British Aerospace and Aérospatiale, kept a keen eye on these developments and often performed their own studies into future supersonic transports.

During the late 1980s, the independent studies performed by British Aerospace and Aérospatiale would coalesce into the Avion de Transport Supersonique Futur (ATSF). A primary objective of this study was to determine not only the technical possibility of such an airliner, but also its commercial viability and compliance with environmental standards, particularly those pertaining to noise and pollution. The study assumed that overland supersonic flight would not be permitted anywhere due to the undesirable sonic booms that people would be otherwise routinely subject to. Operating costs were also examined, as this aspect was particularly valued by the airlines, its prospective customer base. The study recognised that both the development and manufacture of the ATSF would have to be economically feasible, avoid undue technical risks, and likely to be built at such a quantity to be profitable.

It was decided that the ATSF would retain the same Mach 2 maximum speed as Concorde due to the severe engineering challenges posed by going beyond this point. Market analysis had determined that, so long as a supersonic airliner was at least 1.5 times faster than its subsonic competitors, it would attract at least 20 percent of the passengers travelling on that route. Adopting the Mach 2 limit also meant it was relatively easy to compare emerging design concepts to the real life experience garnered from operating Concorde, which had attained 15,000 flight hours fleetwide at this point. A maximum range of 10,000 km was also found to cover 75% of all non-stop long range routes being operated worldwide as of the 1990. Passenger capacity was roughly double that of Concorde, seating 200 passengers; it was speculated that up to 250 could be accommodated on a shorter range ATSF variant.

The basic configuration of the ATSF was broadly similar to Concorde, even to the point of intentionally mimicking design features such as its nose and cockpit. However, reused elements were typically refined for greater aerodynamic efficiency, improved usability, and to address some shortcomings. While an ogee delta wing was also used on the ATSF, substantial effort was placed onto redesigning the wing and fuselage to attain better performance, such as a cruise lift/drag radio of 10. Much attention was paid to the wing and landing gear as to reduce drag; boundary layer control to achieve and maintain laminar flow was also investigated.

Engine installation and selection was also examined; it was quickly found that powerplants that were either substantially larger or heavier would have an undue impact on performance. Even in 1990, the Rolls-Royce/Snecma Olympus 593 turbojet engine, as used on Concorde, still provided the best supersonic performance available amongst existing powerplants. However, if required to perform extended flights at subsonic speeds, it was found that a low-bypass turbofan was optimal. Four engine manufacturers, SNECMA, Rolls-Royce, Pratt and Whitney, and General Electric, had submitted proposals with which to power the ATSF.

By 1994, a trilateral partnership between British Aerospace, Aérospatiale, and the German aircraft manufacturer DaimlerChrysler Aerospace had been formed to develop a supersonic successor to Concorde, which was referred to as the European Supersonic Commercial Transport (ESCT). Amongst other criteria, this project had a similar passenger capacity, top speed, and range to the earlier ATSF. While likely to have been so, it is unclear if this project was a rebranding or restructuring of the earlier ATSF. Irrespectively, the ESCT appears to have taken the role, and place, of the early ATSF project.

== See also ==
- High Speed Civil Transport
- Supersonic transport
