= Tomorrow's World (disambiguation) =

Tomorrow's World was a 1965–2003 BBC series about science and technology.

Tomorrow's World may also refer to:

== Music ==
- Tomorrow's World (album), a 2011 album by Erasure
- Tomorrow's World, a lounge music band that appeared on several compilations of the Él record label
- Tomorrow's World, an electronica band featuring Jean-Benoît Dunckel
- "Tomorrow's World", an all-star country song produced for Earth Day 1990, written by Pam Tillis and Kix Brooks
- "Tomorrow's World", a song by Killing Joke from their 1980 album Killing Joke
- "Tomorrow's World", a 1995 single by Ugly Kid Joe from the album Menace to Sobriety
- "Tomorrow's World", a 2020 single by Matt Bellamy
- "Tomorrow World", a song by Squarepusher from his 1999 album Selection Sixteen

== Television ==
- Tomorrow's World (film), a 20-minute 1943 Canadian documentary film
- Tomorrow's World (1959 TV series), an Australian educational series
- Tomorrow's World, a television program produced by the Living Church of God
- "Tomorrow's World" (Inside Victor Lewis-Smith), a 1993 episode

== See also ==
- TomorrowWorld, an electronic music festival
- Tomorrow, the World!, a 1944 black-and-white film
- Tomorrowland (disambiguation)
- Future World (disambiguation)
- The World Tomorrow (disambiguation)
