= Sex Change (album) =

Studio album by Trans Am
- Released: February 20, 2007
- Genre: Post-Rock
- Length: 42:58
- Label: Thrill Jockey

Trans Am chronology
| Liberation (2004) | Sex Change (2007) | Thing (2010) |

Professional ratings
Review scores
| Source | Rating |
|---|---|
| AllMusic | 4/5 stars |
| Drowned in Sound | 7/10 |
| Pitchfork | 7.0/10 |

Sex Change is the eighth studio album by Trans Am, released in 2007.

== Track listing ==
1. "First Words" – 4:14
2. "North East Rising Sun" – 4:45
3. "Obscene Strategies" – 3:45
4. "Conspiracy of the Gods" – 4:33
5. "Exit Management Solution" – 1:05
6. "Climbing up the Ladder (Parts III and IV)" – 3:30
7. "4,738 Regrets" – 3:50
8. "Reprieve" – 3:38
9. "Tesco v. Sainsbury's" – 2:52
10. "Shining Path" – 4:09
11. "Triangular Pyramid" – 6:41
