= Chang Chen-yuan =

Taiwanese politician

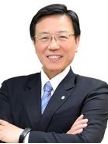
Chang Chen-yuan

Chang Chen-yuan (Chinese: 張政源; pinyin: Zhāng Zhèngyuán), also known by his English name Michael Chang, is a Taiwanese politician.

He graduated from the Department of Transportation and Logistics Management at National Chiao Tung University with a doctorate and served as station master at Taipei Main Station from 1987 to 1991. Chang later successively assumed several public service posts relating to public transportation and tourism. Such positions included leading the tourism division of the Taipei Economic and Cultural Office in New York, a stint as director of the Southwest Coast National Scenic Area, and within Tainan City Government as municipal Bureau of Transportation director and the city's deputy mayor under William Lai.

Chang became political deputy minister of transportation and communications after Lai assumed the premiership. As a result of the derailment of a Puyuma express train in October 2018, Taiwan Railways Administration Director-General Lu Chieh-shen resigned. Chang was appointed to the TRA on 25 October and stepped down at the Ministry of Transportation and Communications to succeed Lu. Chang began his tenure as TRA director-general on 9 November 2018.
