= BAE Systems SkyEye =

Reconnaissance UAV

SkyEye
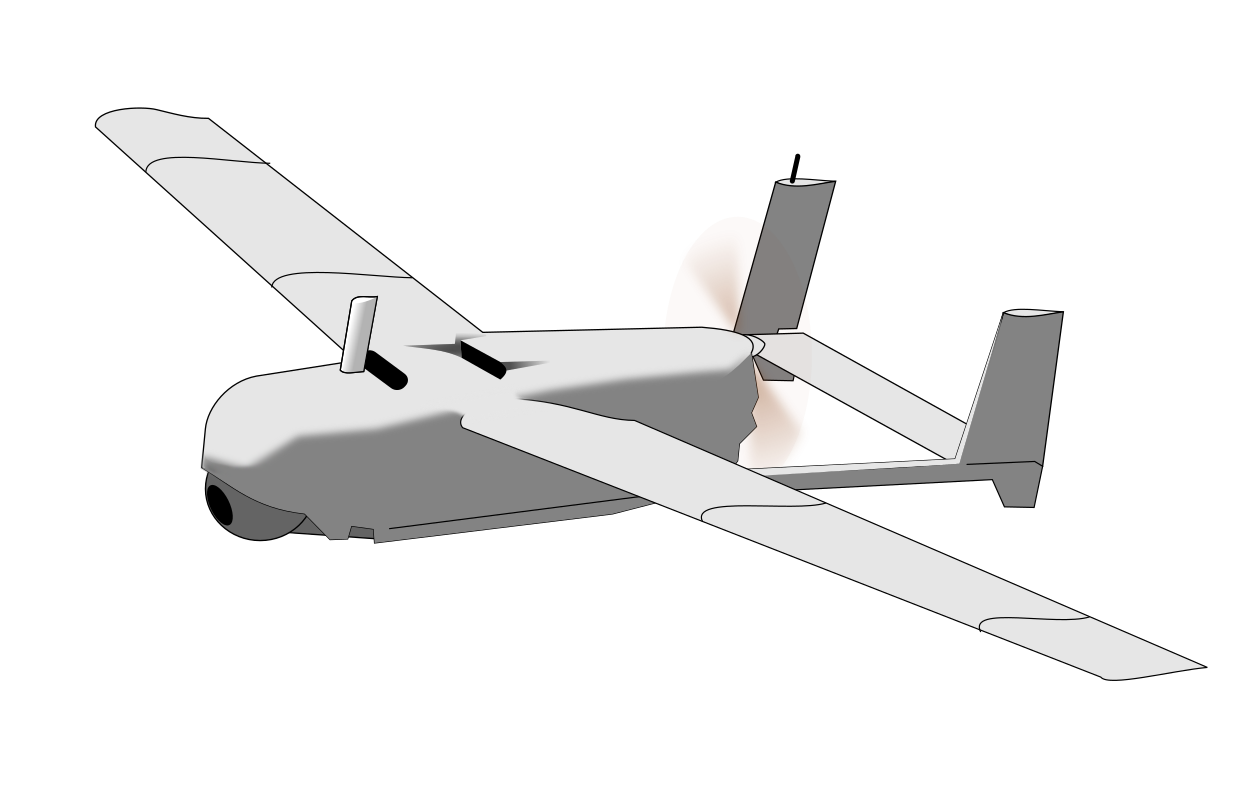
- Artist impression

General information
- Type: Reconnaissance UAV
- National origin: United States, United Kingdom
- Manufacturer: Developmental Sciences Inc, BAE Systems, McDonnell Douglas

History
- First flight: 1973

The BAE Systems SkyEye is a reconnaissance UAV developed in the United States in the early 1970s by Developmental Sciences Inc, later called Developmental Sciences Corporation, a division of Lear Astronics Corporation and ultimately part of BAE Systems. Developmental Sciences Inc was one of the first US companies to investigate battlefield UAVs, flying the first prototype of the SkyEye series in 1973, leading to the first flight of the improved R4E variant in 1981. The R4E has been continuously refined since then in a sequence of subvariants.

The R4E SkyEye is in service with a number of countries, including Egypt and Morocco, for battlefield surveillance, and has also been used commercially for pesticide spraying. Apparently a few stock R4Es were also purchased by the US Army's South Command in Latin America and used for border patrols. The United States Army had also considered a variant of it, the McDonnell Douglas Sky Owl, for the short-range UAV competition. As the Sky Owl, McDonnell Douglas leveraged it into the company's proposal for the Army competition, but apparently it proved generally inferior to the RQ-5 Hunter.

The SkyEye has the common pusher-propeller twin-tailboom configuration, but it has distinctive slightly swept wings and antennas on top of the tailplanes. It is powered by a UAV Engines Limited (UEL) 39 kW (52 hp) rotary engine. The SkyEye can carry two underwing stores along with its other payload. It lands on a retractable centerline skid or can be recovered by parachute.

The R4E-30 variant is designated B.W.1 (Thai: บ.ว.๑) by the Royal Thai Armed Forces.

== Specifications (R4E SkyEye) ==
General characteristics

- Crew: None
- Capacity: 180 lb (82 kg) payload
- Length: 13 ft 5 in (4.10 m)
- Wingspan: 24 ft 0 in (7.32 m)
- Gross weight: 1,250 lb (570 kg)
- Powerplant: 1 × UEL , 52 hp (39 kW)

Performance

- Maximum speed: 125 mph (200 km/h, 109 kn)
- Endurance: >8 hours
- Service ceiling: 15,000 ft (4,600 m)
