= The Future (Steven Universe Future) =

- Steven Universe Future episode
- Title card
- Episode no.: Episode 20
- Directed by: Alonso Ramirez Ramos; Kat Morris
- Written by: Lamar Abrams; Miki Brewster
- Original air date: March 27, 2020

Episode chronology
← Previous "I Am My Monster"	Next → —

"The Future" is the 20th and final episode of the American animated limited series Steven Universe Future, which serves as an epilogue to the 2013–2019 television series Steven Universe; it is therefore also the final episode of the Steven Universe franchise. It originally aired on Cartoon Network on March 27, 2020, as the fourth and final part of the series finale.

This final episode takes place in the aftermath of the events of the series, which focuses on protagonist Steven Universe's unresolved trauma and need to feel needed by his friends and family. In the penultimate episode, Steven's stress builds up to the point that he becomes a monster and endangers his hometown of Beach City until the unconditional emotional support of his loved ones brings him back to normal. In the finale, Steven finally decides to leave Beach City, but he worries that Garnet, Amethyst, and Pearl will not miss him after his departure.

== Plot ==
It has been several months since Steven's (Zach Callison) meltdown, wherein he became a monster as a result of repressed trauma. Now back to normal, Steven and his best friend Connie (Grace Rolek) discuss his plans to leave Beach City and travel the country; he has told everyone about his decision except the Gems. He worries about their reactions and hopes he can let them down easy.

Steven shares homemade Cookie Cat ice cream sandwiches with Garnet (Estelle), Amethyst (Michaela Dietz), and Pearl (Deedee Magno Hall). The Gems sing the Cookie Cat advertising jingle, according to which the Cookie Cat mascot "left his family behind", allowing Steven to segue into his announcement that he's decided to move out the next day. He urges the Gems not to talk him out of his decision, but they seem to take his decision very lightly and are proud of him showing a desire to be independent.

Bismuth (Miriam Hyman), Lapis (Jennifer Paz), and Peridot (Shelby Rabara) are distraught when he gives them the news. Steven gives them farewell gifts: his old pink shirt for Peridot, an art kit for Lapis, and the Crystal Gems' old battle flag for Bismuth. Later, Jasper (Kimberly Brooks) tries to insist on coming with him to protect him, but he assures her that he can protect himself.

Back at the Temple, Steven gives Garnet, Amethyst, and Pearl their farewell gifts: Amethyst gets his old video games, Pearl his ukulele, and Garnet the wedding plan book he used to plan Ruby and Sapphire's wedding. All three accept the gifts nonchalantly, showing little concern about Steven's impending departure. Steven's father Greg (Tom Scharpling) tells him they are probably trying to be supportive. As his parting gift for Greg, Steven encourages his father to move into Steven's room in the beach house.

Steven says his farewells, kisses Connie goodbye, and drives off toward his next destination, but soon stops the car and returns to confront the Gems, demanding to know why they are taking the situation so lightly. The Gems burst into tears and explain they did not want their sad thoughts to prevent Steven from leaving. They assure him that, whatever happens in his future, they will be part of it. Everyone says they love each other, they give Steven one more goodbye, and he drives away to find his own future. The citizens of Beach City wave goodbye as Steven begins his road trip, marking the end of the series.

== Reception ==
=== Viewership ===
The episode was watched by 0.74 million people.

=== Response ===
The episode was favorably received by critics, who praised the themes and result of the finale, especially revolving around the concluding character arc of Steven. Some critics, including Shamus Kelley of Den of Geek, expressed admiration for Steven's revelation of feeling comfort in accepting help from others and felt the series ended the way it had to. Jourdain Searles of The A.V. Club gave the finale episode a score of a B, explaining how the series ending on a quiet and uneventful episode was a correct move, considering how the core objective of the series revolved around Steven coming to terms with his pain, and with the conflict solved, all that was left was to wrap up the series.

== Future ==
While series creator Rebecca Sugar has confirmed that this is the finale of the franchise and that there is no continuation in development, nor any ongoing projects, she has hinted that possible future stories exist. "The story is continuing off-screen and I do know what happens next...But I would have to decide how and when I'd want to dig into that, or if it's best to give them their privacy."

Sugar later told Fast Company "I'm certainly interested in spending more time in this world with these characters. But the thing about Steven Universe, it's about Steven Universe and I want to give him the time to heal", [Sugar says.] "I want to give that to my team as well. So I'm not really sure for certain what's going to happen in the future. I have a few ideas, but I'm going to take a little time to reevaluate everything before I jump into them."

In a much later interview marking 10 years since the original series' premiere, Sugar told Variety that they would be interested in making a revival of the series if demand is high enough, stating that "I would really, really appreciate it if everyone who would be interested in something like that would make a ton of noise and make it really known — because I would be thrilled to explore that. I think in this current media landscape, if there's a huge amount of public demand, then that is something that becomes impossible to ignore."

In June 2025, a spin-off titled Steven Universe: Lars of the Stars was announced.
