= Future Worlds =

1987 science fiction role-playing game

Future Worlds is a science fiction role-playing game published by Stellar Gaming Workshop in 1987.

== Description ==
Future Worlds is a science-fiction space-adventure system set in an interstellar society of the far future. The game includes a section on Mystics, a class of magical spell-casters.

Both the character generation system and the combat system are quite complex.

== Publication history ==
Future Worlds was designed by Patrick Lesser, and published by Stellar Gaming Workshop in 1987 as an 80-page spiral-bound paperback.

== Reception ==
Rick Swan wrote a couple of reviews:

- In Space Gamer/Fantasy Gamer No. 83, Swan commented that "Future Worlds could've been a reasonably good supplement for those wishing to add an advanced combat system to another game. a browse through the spell lists might generate some ideas for an existing fantasy campaign. But as for the game itself – not for me.".
- Two years later, in his book The Complete Guide to Role-Playing Games, Swan noted that although the game purported to mix science fiction and fantasy, "Fantasy takes a distant back seat to a colorless science-fiction setting involving humans and aliens competing for galactic domination... I think (it's pretty vague.)" Swan didn't like the character generation system, commenting that "Character creation focuses on charts and tables, not personality traits, and the resulting characters are little more than collections of numbers." Swan concluded by giving this game a very poor rating of 1.5 out of 4, saying, "With few hints as to how this is all supposed to fit together in a cohesive adventure, the Future World referee will have his work cut out for him."

In his 1991 book Heroic Worlds, Lawrence Schick commented that the game was "Heavy on charts and tables and light on character development."
