= Futureworld (album) =

Studio album by Trans Am
- Released: March 23, 1999
- Genre: Post-Rock
- Length: 47:42
- Label: Thrill Jockey
- Producer: Trans Am

Trans Am chronology
The Surveillance (1998)	Futureworld (1999)	Red Line (2000)

Professional ratings
Review scores
Source	Rating
AllMusic	4/5 stars
NME	6/10
Pitchfork	8.0/10
Spin	8/10

Futureworld is the fourth album by the American band Trans Am, released in 1999. The band uses lyrics in their songs for the first time, employing vocoder synthesis.

== Critical reception ==
Trouser Press wrote that "the heavily processed, robotic singing takes a back seat to the grooves that nearly imprison these songs with their droning insistence." The Village Voice called the album "arguably [the band's] definitive futurist new wave statement."

== Track listings ==
1. "1999"
2. "Television Eyes"
3. "Futureworld"
4. "City In Flames"
5. "AM Rhein"
6. "Cocaine Computer"
7. "Runners Standing Still"
8. "Futureworld II"
9. "Positron"
10. "Sad and Young"

=== Additional tracks on Japanese release ===
1. "Alec Empire is a Nazi/Hippie"
2. "Am Rhein (Party Mix)"
3. "Woffen Shenter"
4. "Thriddle Giggit Dream"
5. "Ardroth Marketplace"
