= Mustaqbal =

Mustaqbal (in Arabic مستقبل) or Al Mustaqbal (in Arabic المستقبل), Mustaqbal means future (as a time).

May refer to:

- Al-Mustaqbal (electoral list), an electoral list in the Palestinian territories
- Al-Mustaqbal (football club), a Libyan football club
- Al-Mustaqbal (newspaper), a Lebanese newspaper
- Al Mustaqbal magazine, Malay language ISIS publication
- Mustaqbal (political party), a political association that participated in the 2021 Puntland municipal elections in Somalia

== See also ==
- Future Movement (in Arabic تيار المستقبل pronounced Tayyar Al-Mustaqbal), Lebanese political movement
- Future Television, (in Arabic تلفزيون المستقبل pronounced Televiziyon Al Mustaqbal), Lebanese television station belonging to Future Movement
