= Surrender to the Night =

Studio album by Trans Am
- Released: January 30, 1997
- Genre: Post-rock
- Length: 45:02
- Label: Thrill Jockey
- Producer: John McEntire and Trans Am

Trans Am chronology
Trans Am (1996)	Surrender to the Night (1997)	The Surveillance (1998)

Professional ratings
Review scores
Source	Rating
AllMusic	3/5 stars
NME	7/10

Surrender to the Night is the second album by Trans Am, released in 1997.

== Critical reception ==
Entertainment Weekly called the album "a blend of Wire-esque jaggedness, arena-rock machismo, and the occasional dance-friendly beat." The Washington Post deemed it "a great record from a band pushing all the dance/noise/punk envelopes."

AllMusic wrote: "The group is at its best when they stumble onto the occasional square foot of new territory (as on 'Cologne', 'Tough Love', and the title cut, all of which wed live, more immediately rock-based instrumentation with electro-funk rhythms and synth figures), but much of Surrender lays on familiar, by now somewhat fallow soil."

== Track listing ==
1. MOTR – 3:42
2. Cologne – 4:05
3. Illegalize It – 3:49
4. Love Commander – 4:54
5. Rough Justice – 3:31
6. Zero Tolerance – 1:53
7. Tough Love – 4:28
8. Night Dreaming – 2:15
9. Night Dancing – 2:40
10. Carboforce – 7:45
11. Surrender to the Night – 5:58

=== Japanese CD release additional live tracks ===
1. Firepoker
2. Strong Sensations
3. Love Commander
4. Surrender to the Night
5. Rough Justice
6. Night Dancing
7. Ankoot Outro
8. Orlando
