= Ancient Future =

Ancient Future may refer to:

- Ancient Future (group), a musical ensemble popular in the world music genre
- Ancient Future (album), an album by American band Warrior
- A series of books by Robert E. Webber
- Ancient Future Churches, otherwise known as the Paleo-orthodoxy of Protestant Christianity
