= Cache Cœur Naïf =

EP by Mouse on Mars
- Released: 12 May 1997
- Genre: IDM, post-rock, electronic
- Length: 17:04
- Label: Too Pure Records; Thrill Jockey Records; Rough Trade Records
- Producer: Jan St. Werner; Andi Toma

Mouse on Mars chronology
Iaora Tahiti (1995)	Cache Cœur Naïf (1997)	Autoditacker (1997)

Cache Cœur Naïf is an EP by German electronic band Mouse on Mars. It was released in 1997 on Too Pure Records, Thrill Jockey Records and Rough Trade Records. It was recorded in collaboration with British band Stereolab, which had also co-created their album Dots and Loops and the Miss Modular EP with Mouse on Mars.

== Track listing ==
All tracks (except 4) have Laetitia Sadier on vocals, track 1 has Mary Hansen on backing vocals.

1. "Cache Cœur Naïf" – 3:20
2. "Schnick-Schnack" – 6:00
3. "Lazergum" – 3:38
4. "Glim" – 6:01

== Credits ==
Taken from the source:

- Eric Bernaud – turntables
- Dinah Frank – photography
- Mary Hansen – vocals (Background)
- London Too Pure – engineer
- Frieda Luczak – art direction, artwork
- Mouse on Mars – arranger, composer, primary Artist, producer
- Laetitia Sadier – vocals
