= Pickly Dred Rhizzoms =

EP by Mouse on Mars
- Released: 3 May 1999
- Genre: IDM; glitch; electronica
- Length: 17:56
- Label: Sonig; Thrill Jockey
- Producer: Jan St. Werner; Andi Toma

Mouse on Mars chronology
Glam (1998)	Pickly Dred Rhizzoms (1999)	Niun Niggung (1999)

Pickly Dred Rhizzoms is an EP by German electronica band Mouse on Mars. It was released on 3 May 1999 by Sonig and Thrill Jockey. It features experiments with glitch and techno further present on band's previous and next albums Autoditacker, Glam and Niun Niggung. EP uses more acoustic instrumentation, polyrythms and breakbeats.

== Track listing ==
All tracks written and composed by Jan St. Werner and Andi Toma, except where noted:

Side one
No.	Title	Writer(s)	Length
1.	"Pickly Dred Rhizzoms"		1:51
2.	"Tape Me Baby"	Dodo NKishi / Toma / St. Werner	3:51
3.	"Stuffed Funk"	Dodo NKishi / Toma / St. Werner	4:58

Side two
No.	Title	Length
4.	"Endlosrile"	0:32
5.	"Pulsacion"	0:25
6.	"Shamp Hare Rama"	6:22

- On some versions "Pickly Dred Rhizzoms" is placed as last track.

== Personnel ==
- Composers: Jan St. Werner, Andi Toma, Dodo NKishi
