= Varcharz =

Studio album by Mouse on Mars
- Released: September 12, 2006
- Recorded: 2003–2006
- Studio: St. Martin Tonstudio, Düsseldorf
- Genre: IDM, glitch, drill 'n' bass
- Length: 52:19
- Label: Ipecac, Sonig
- Producer: Jan St. Werner, Andi Toma

Mouse on Mars chronology
Live 04 (2005)	Varcharz (2006)	Parastrophics (2012)

Varcharz is a studio album by German electronica duo Mouse on Mars. It was released by Ipecac Recordings in 2006. Contrasting with their previous album, Radical Connector, which had a poppier sound, Varcharz has a much more abrasive sound.

== Critical reception ==
Professional ratings
Aggregate scores
Source	Rating
Metacritic	71/100
Review scores
Source	Rating
AllMusic	4/5 stars
Cokemachineglow	65/100
Pitchfork	7.1/10

At Metacritic, which assigns a weighted average score out of 100 to reviews from mainstream critics, Varcharz received an average score of 71% based on 10 reviews, indicating "generally favorable reviews".

Heather Phares of AllMusic said, "Varcharz shows that the duo is just as adamant about -- and adept at -- exploring the wilder fringes of their sound as they are honing it into forward-thinking pop."

== Track listing ==
No.	Title	Length
1.	"Chartnok"	6:01
2.	"I Go Ego Why Go We Go"	5:01
3.	"Duul"	6:34
4.	"Inocular"	5:34
5.	"Skik"	5:43
6.	"Hi Fienilin"	6:51
7.	"Bertney"	5:21
8.	"Retphase"	6:07
9.	"One Day, Not Today"	5:08

Japanese edition bonus track
No.	Title	Length
10.	"Ignition Segments"	4:18

== Personnel ==
Credits adapted from liner notes.

- Jan St. Werner – music, production
- Andi Toma – music, production
