= Nathan Hare =

American sociologist (1933–2024)

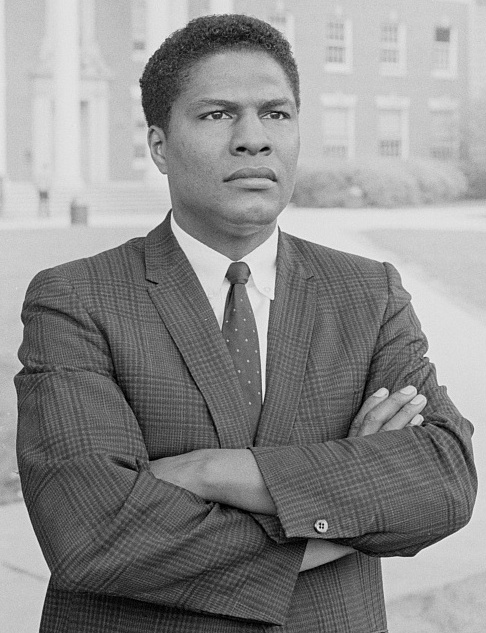
- Hare in 1967
- Born: April 9, 1933; Creek County, Oklahoma, U.S.
- Died: June 10, 2024 (aged 91); San Francisco, California, U.S.
- Spouse: Julia Ann Reed (m. 1956; died 2019)

Academic background
- Education: Langston University; University of Chicago (MA, PhD); California School of Professional Psychology (PhD)

Academic work
- Discipline: Sociology, psychology
- Institutions: Howard University; San Francisco State University

Nathaniel Hare (April 9, 1933 – June 10, 2024) was an American sociologist, activist, academic, and psychologist. In 1968 he was the first person hired to coordinate a Black studies program in the United States. He established the program at San Francisco State University. A graduate of Langston University and the University of Chicago, he became involved in the Black Power movement while teaching at Howard University.

After being fired as chair of the Black Studies program at San Francisco State, in November 1969 Hare and Robert Chrisman co-founded the journal, The Black Scholar: A Journal of Black Studies and Research. Nathan Hare was founding publisher of the journal from 1969 to 1975.

After earning a PhD in clinical psychology, Hare set up a private practice in Oakland and San Francisco. He founded the Black Think Tank with his wife, Julia Hare, and published a periodical called Black Male/Female Relationships for several years. He and Julia Hare have written and published several books together on Black families and Black history.

== Early life and education ==
Hare was born on his parents' sharecropper farm near the Creek County town of Slick, Oklahoma, on April 9, 1933. He attended segregated public schools, L'Ouverture (variously spelled "Louverture") Elementary School and L'Ouverture High School. The two schools were named after the Haitian revolutionary and general Toussaint Louverture; they were part of the so-called "Slick Separate Schools" in the late 1930s and 1940s.

When Hare was eleven years old, his family migrated to San Diego, California during the defense buildup related to World War II. His single mother took a civilian janitorial job with the Navy air station. Hundreds of thousands of blacks left the South and migrated to California and other places on the West Coast, in the Great Migration through 1970, totaling 5 million in all. As World War II ended and his mother was laid off, she brought her family back to Oklahoma. This put on hold Hare's ambition to become a professional boxer, an idea he had picked up after adult neighbors in San Diego assured him that writers all starve to death.

Hare's life changed in high school after he was selected in ninth grade to represent the class at the annual statewide "Interscholastic Meet" of the black students held at Oklahoma's Langston University. (His English teacher had administered standardized tests in English Composition, and selected him for his score on the test.) Hare won first prize at the meet, with more prizes to come in ensuing years. The L'Ouverture principal encouraged him to go to college and arranged for him to start at Langston with a full-time job working in the University Dining Hall to pay his way. By his junior year, Hare was working as a Dormitory Proctor of the University Men, and as a Freshman Tutor in his senior year.

When Hare enrolled at Langston University, it was the only college to admit Black students in the state of Oklahoma. The town of Langston and the college were named for John Mercer Langston, one of five African Americans elected to Congress from the South in the late 19th century, before the former Confederate states passed constitutions that effectively disenfranchised most blacks and ended their participation in politics for decades. The town was founded by black nationalists hoping to make the Oklahoma Territory an all-Black state. Langston, Oklahoma claimed to be the first all-black town established in the United States.

One of Hare's professors was the poet Melvin B. Tolson, whose teaching style would be portrayed in The Great Debaters. Graduating from Langston with his BA in sociology, Hare won a Danforth Fellowship to continue his education; he obtained an MA (1957) and PhD in sociology (1962) from the University of Chicago.

== Career ==
Hare started his academic career in 1961 as an assistant sociology professor at Howard University, a historically black university in Washington, DC. He was dismissed in June 1967 after becoming increasingly involved with the Black Power movement on campus and leading student-faculty protests.

In 1966, he wrote a letter to the campus newspaper, The Hilltop, mocking Howard president James Nabrit's statement to The Washington Post on September 3, 1966, that he hoped to increase white enrollment at Howard to as much as 60%. Nabrit had been part of the NAACP legal team to successfully argue the 1954 Brown vs. Board of Education case before the U.S. Supreme Court, which ruled that segregation of public schools was unconstitutional. By 1966, the civil rights movement had achieved passage of the Civil Rights Act of 1964 and Voting Rights Act of 1965. After that, some activists were seeking "Black Power," as declared by Stokely Carmichael in Montgomery, Alabama, who was a former student of Hare. (Hare had also taught Claude Brown, future author of Manchild in the Promised Land).

On February 22, 1967, Hare held a press conference with students identified as "The Black Power Committee," and read "The Black University Manifesto." It called for "the overthrow of the Negro college with white innards and to raise in its place a black university, relevant to the black community and its needs." Hare had previously published a book called The Black Anglo Saxons; he coined the phrase, "The Ebony Tower," to characterize Howard University.

In the spring of 1967, Hare invited the champion fighter Muhammad Ali to speak at Howard. He was controversial for statements about black power and as one of numerous opponents to the Vietnam War. The champion gave his popular "Black Is Best" speech to an impromptu crowd of 4,000 gathered at a moment's notice outside the university's Frederick Douglass Hall. The administration had padlocked the Crampton Auditorium to prevent Ali from speaking there because of his statements against the war, days before he refused to be drafted. Hare was dismissed effective in June 1967.

Thereafter, Hare briefly resumed his own aborted professional boxing efforts. He won his last fight by a knockout in the first round in the Washington Coliseum on December 5, 1967.

Hare was recruited to San Francisco State in February 1968 by John Summerskill, the college's liberal president, and the Black Student Union leader Jimmy Garrett. Hare wrote the "Conceptual Proposal for a Department of Black Studies"; he coined the term "ethnic studies" (which was being called "minority studies") when Hare was introduced by Garrett to a meeting of the Council of Academic Deans. which was considering the establishment of a program of "minority studies" the day Hare arrived on campus.

At San Francisco State, the Black Student Union demanded an "autonomous Department of Black Studies." Hare was soon involved in a five-month strike to establish such a department. The strike was led by the Black Student Union and backed by the Third World Liberation Front and the local chapter of the American Federation of Teachers. A broad range of students and professors participated in the strike, which also included community leaders and the Black Faculty Union headed by Hare. Mel Stewart was also a member of the Black Faculty Union, but Hare was the only one invited to become a "quasi-member" of the Central Committee of the Black Student Union. (Student Danny Glover was on the committee prior to his years of becoming a successful Hollywood actor.) Student Ronald Dellums spoke almost daily at the noonday strike rallies; he later became a politician, serving in Congress and as Mayor of Oakland, California.

The student-faculty strike disrupted university operations, and contributed to the firing of President Summerskill and resignation of his successor, Robert Smith. The next president was S. I. Hayakawa, a semantics scholar. (He later was elected as a U.S. Senator). Hayakawa used a hard-line strategy to put down the five-month strike, declaring "martial law" and arresting a crowd of 557 rallying professors and students (the overwhelming majority of whom were white). Weeks later, on February 28, 1969, Hayakawa dismissed Hare as chairman of the newly formed black studies department, the first in the United States, effective June 1 of that year. Then, Hare met with the Black Student Union and members of the Black Studies faculty as unofficial "Chairman in Exile" until the end of the fall.

Ten years earlier, in 1959, while doing graduate study in Northwestern University's Medill School of Journalism, Hare had been a part-time clerical assistant to Roger F. Hacket, the white editor of the Journal of Asian Studies. Hare was inspired to dream of editing a "Journal of Negro Studies" ("Negro" was the commonly used word among blacks in 1959). During the next decade, Hare published articles in such magazines and periodicals as: Ebony, Negro Digest, Black World, Phylon Review, Social Forces, Social Education, Newsweek, and The Times.

Months after being fired from San Francisco State, Hare teamed with Robert Chrisman, a black faculty member of the college's English Department, and Allan Ross (an independent white intellectual who owned the Graphic Arts of Marin printing company near Sausalito). They founded the journal, The Black Scholar: A Journal of Black Studies and Research) in November 1969. The three had met at a bar frequented by San Francisco State faculty members in nearby Stonestown. Hare and Chrisman chipped in $300 each to launch the journal, working from a room that Ross made available to them rent-free in the Graphic Arts building. Ross came to the journal space after his own work to set type into the night.

Other early members of the editorial board included Shirley Chisholm, later elected to the US Congress; Imamu Baraka, a noted playwright; Angela Davis, scholar and activist; Dempsey Travis, Max Roach, John Oliver Killens, Ossie Davis, Shirley Graham Du Bois, Ron Karenga, and Lerone Bennett.

The first issue attracted attention because of its cover design. In addition, Hare used it to promote articles and thinkers from the First Pan African Cultural Festival in Algiers, which he had attended. He published articles from leading African intellectuals as well as the American activist Stokely Carmichael and recently exiled Black Panther leader, Eldridge Cleaver. Nathan wrote the lead article, "Algiers 1969: The First Pan African Cultural Festival," to "set the tone" of the journal. This article was reprinted in Abraham Chapman's New Black Voices (a 1972 paperback Mentor Book from New American Library). Its title was featured on a cover that included pieces by Eldridge Cleaver, John Oliver Killens, Ernest J. Gaines, Robert Hayden, Malcolm X, Chester Himes, Imamu Amiri Baraka, Nikki Giovanni, Margaret Walker, James Baldwin, Ralph Ellison and Ishmael Reed.

Through friends and contacts of Hare's wife Julia, who was then Public Information Director of the Western Regional office of the National Committee against Discrimination in Housing, The Black Scholar was featured in Newsweek under an article entitled, "From the Ebony Tower." The New York Times would soon call it "the most important journal devoted to black issues since 'The Crisis,'" the journal of the National Association for the Advancement of Colored People (NAACP).

Hare left The Black Scholar in 1975, in an ideological dispute over the direction of the journal. In an open letter, he said that the editorial board had become too enamored of marxist thought and was not publishing enough other representatives of black nationalist culture.

He changed fields to psychology. He earned his second Ph.D., this one in clinical psychology from the California School of Professional Psychology, in San Francisco. His dissertation was Black Male/Female Relations. Hare set up a private practice of psychotherapy, with offices in San Francisco and Oakland. With his new practice, Hare also worked on developing a movement for "A Better Black Family."

By 1979, in collaboration with his wife, Julia Hare, he founded the Black Think Tank. Among its publications was the periodical, Black Male/Female Relationships, which it published for several years.

Hare continued to run a full-time practice of psychology and directs the Black Think Tank. In 1985, it published a small book written by him and his wife (Bringing the Black Boy to Manhood). This was among numerous publications dealing with black youth, and contributed to the development of a 1980s movement for rites of passage for African-American boys. Both of the Hares lectured and promoted this practice across the United States. Julia Hare later published a book, How to Find and Keep a BMW (Black Man Working) (1995). Her comments at the Tavis Smiley State of the Black Union Conference in 2008 about black leaders were widely covered and posted to YouTube.

== Personal life and death ==
Hare married fellow Langston University student Julia Ann Reed in 1956. She worked in communications and public relations, and later collaborated with him on several books and as cofounder of The Black Think Tank. Nathan Hare died in San Francisco on June 10, 2024, at the age of 91. Julia died in 2019; they had no children.

== Books ==
- The Black Anglo Saxons. New York: Marzani and Munsell, 1965; New York: Collier-Macmillan, 1970; Chicago: Third World Press edition, Chicago, 1990, ISBN 0-88378-130-1.

With Robert Chrisman, Hare co-edited:

- Contemporary Black Thought, Indianapolis: Bobbs-Merrill, 1973, ISBN 0-672-51821-X.
- Pan-Africanism, Indianapolis: Bobbs-Merrill, 1974, ISBN 0-672-51869-4.

Hare wrote books with his wife Julia Hare (formerly a radio talk show host and television guest). They were published by their enterprise, The Black Think Tank of San Francisco. They include:

- The Endangered Black Family, San Francisco: The Black Think Tank, 1984, ISBN 0-9613086-0-5.
- Bringing the Black Boy to Manhood: the Passage, San Francisco: The Black Think Tank, 1985, ISBN 0-9613086-1-3.
- Crisis in Black Sexual Politics, San Francisco: The Black Think Tank, 1989, ISBN 0-9613086-2-1.
- Fire on Mount Zion: An Autobiography of the Tulsa Race Riot, as told by Mabel B. Little. Langston: The Melvin B. Tolson Black Heritage Center, Langston University, 1990, OCLC 22451754 ASIN B0012CRWPQ
- The Miseducation of the Black Child: The Hare Plan to Educate Every Black Man, Woman and Child, San Francisco: The Black Think Tank, 1991, ISBN 0-9613086-4-8.
- The Black Agenda, San Francisco: The Black Think Tank, 2002, ISBN 0-9613086-9-9.
