= AAI (album) =

Studio album by Mouse on Mars
- Released: 26 February 2021
- Genre: Electronic
- Length: 61:55
- Label: Thrill Jockey
- Producer: Andi Toma; Jan St. Werner

Mouse on Mars chronology
Dimensional People (2018)	AAI (2021)

AAI is a studio album by German electronic music group Mouse on Mars. It was released on 26 February 2021 through Thrill Jockey. It received generally favorable reviews from critics.

== Background ==
Mouse on Mars consists of Andi Toma and Jan St. Werner. AAI features contributions from Louis Chude-Sokei and a group of software programmers. It was created using custom-made speech modeling software. The album's title stands for "anarchic artificial intelligence". The album was released on 26 February 2021 through Thrill Jockey.

== Critical reception ==
Professional ratings
Aggregate scores
Source	Rating
Metacritic	80/100
Review scores
Source	Rating
AllMusic	4.5/5 stars
Pitchfork	7.2/10
Spectrum Culture	77%
Uncut	8/10

According to the review aggregator Metacritic, AAI received "generally favorable reviews" based on a weighted average score of 80 out of 100 from 6 critic scores.

Danijela Bočev of The Quietus stated, "Deeply strange, yet strangely accessible record, AAI is an hour-long journey, combining short interludes with complex compositions." Heather Phares of AllMusic commented that "Toma and St. Werner blur the boundaries between organic and mechanical expertly with the warm, rubbery tones they use and with the album's vivid audio storytelling." She added, "their music is evolving in sync with their technology, and AAI presents a bold challenge to conventional notions of creativity, authenticity, learning, and emotion." Philip Sherburne of Pitchfork wrote, "For all their conceptual bent, Mouse on Mars have never let their concepts eclipse the music; part of the pleasure of the duo's output is its very inscrutability."

=== Accolades ===
Year-end lists for AAI
Publication	List	Rank	Ref.
AllMusic	AllMusic Best of 2021	—	

== Track listing ==
AAI track listing
No.	Title	Length
1.	"Engineering Systems"	0:21
2.	"The Latent Space"	6:26
3.	"Speech and Ambulation"	7:05
4.	"Thousand to One"	5:31
5.	"Walking and Talking"	6:19
6.	"Youmachine"	4:08
7.	"Doublekeyrock"	2:24
8.	"Machine Rights"	1:42
9.	"Go Tick"	4:19
10.	"The Fear of Machines"	1:43
11.	"Artificial Authentic"	3:35
12.	"Machine Perspective"	0:43
13.	"Cut That Fishernet"	5:31
14.	"Tools Use Tools"	0:30
15.	"Loose Tools"	1:01
16.	"Seven Months"	2:31
17.	"Paymig"	0:46
18.	"Borrow Signs"	1:50
19.	"New Definitions"	4:14
20.	"New Life Always Announces Itself Through Sound"	1:15
Total length:		61:55

== Personnel ==
Credits adapted from liner notes.

- Andi Toma – instruments, electronics, production
- Jan St. Werner – instruments, electronics, production
- Dodo NKishi – drums, percussion
- Louis Chude-Sokei – text, voice
- Yagmur Uckunkaya – voice, AI
- Tunde Alibaba – percussion
- Drumno – drums
- Eric D. Clarke – loose tool
- Nicholas Gorges – AI
- Florian Dohmann – AI
- Rany Keddo – AI
- Derek Tingle – AI
- Zino Mikorey – mastering
- Kitaro Beeh – vinyl cut
- Casey Reas – computer graphics
- Rupert Smyth Studio – art direction
