= Ya Tosiba =

Finnish electronic music duo

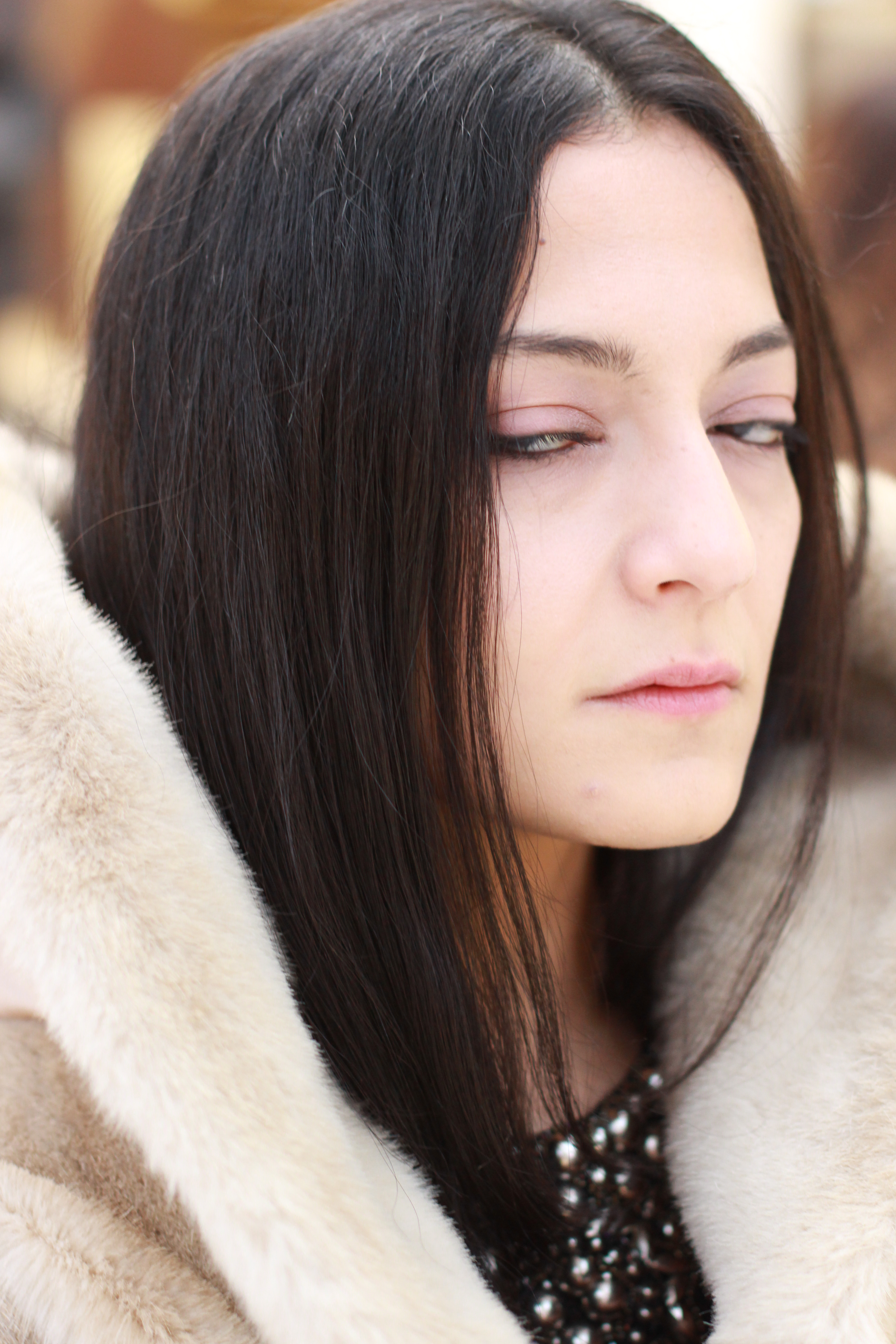
- Singer Zuzu Zakaria

Background information
- Origin: Helsinki, Finland
- Genres: Avant-pop, Global Beats, Hip hop, Electronic dance music, Skweee
- Years active: 2010–present
- Labels: Asphalt Tango Records
- Members: Zuzu Zakaria; Tatu Metsätähti

Ya Tosiba started out as an electronic music duo formed in Finland in 2010, consisting of Norwegian-Azerbaijani singer and producer Zuzu Zakaria and Finnish electronic music producer Tatu Metsätähti (also known as Mesak). Zuzu continues the project as a solo artist.

Their music is a blend of Scandinavian electronic music, Hip hop and classical Arabic, Persian and Turkic music traditions such as Mugam and Ashik. The texts and poetry used are historical and belong to a genre known as Meykhana. Those were found by Zuzu Zakaria at field-trips to Azerbaijan as a part of her MA Thesis for State University in Oslo. Her master's thesis is the only introductory study in English of the genre existing.

== Discography ==
=== Studio albums ===
- 2017 Love Party (Asphalt Tango Records)
- 2023 ASAP inşallah (Huge Bass)

=== Collaborations ===
- 2012 Mouse on Mars: Parastrophics (Monkey Town), track 12: Baku Hipster
- 2012 Center Of The Universe: Astral Harassment (Metronomicon Audio), track 1: Streelight Interference
- 2015 Joxaren: Diir Balek (European Music), track B1: Qurban Gəlir
- 2017 Pykäri: Pykäri (Solina Records), track 09: Anlatamıyorum

=== Remixes ===
- 2016 Racing Heart: What Comes After (Ya Tosiba Remix)

=== Compilations ===
- 2013 Skweee! (Laton Records), track A3: Anti-futbol (Meykhanacid mix)
- 2016 Tribute To Kylmä Sota (Brown Records), track A5: PST
- 2016 Metronomicon Audio 7.0 & 8.0 (Metronomicon Audio), track 2-3: Qoçu

=== Singles and EPs ===
- 2012 Mad Barber (Harmönia)
- 2014 Mollah The Machine (Pingipung)
- 2014 Mollah The Machine Remixes (Pingipung)
