= Robert L. Allen =

American activist, writer, and academic (1942–2024)

- Born: Robert Lee Allen; May 29, 1942; Atlanta, Georgia, U.S.
- Died: July 10, 2024 (aged 82); Benicia, California, U.S.
- Education: University of California, San Francisco
- Occupations: Writer; activist; academic
- Known for: Senior editor of The Black Scholar; Co-founder of Wild Trees Press
- Notable work: Black Awakening in Capitalist America: An Analytic History (1969); Brotherman: The Odyssey of Black Men in America (co-edited with Herb Boyd, 1995)
- Spouse: Pam Allen (m. 1965, divorced) Janet Carter (m. 1995)
- Awards: American Book Award (1995)

Robert Lee Allen (May 29, 1942 – July 10, 2024) was an American activist, writer, and adjunct professor of African-American Studies and Ethnic Studies at the University of California, Berkeley. Allen received his Ph.D. in Sociology from the University of California, San Francisco, and previously taught at San José State University and Mills College.

Allen was senior editor (with editor-in-chief and publisher Robert Chrisman) of The Black Scholar: Journal of Black Studies and Research, published quarterly or more frequently in Oakland, California, by the Black World Foundation since 1969.

== Biography ==
Robert Lee Allen Jr. was born on May 29, 1942, in Atlanta, Georgia, to parents who were both community activists; His mother, Sadie (Sims) Allen, was a teacher at Spelman College, and his father was a mechanic.

He attended the University of Vienna, 1961–62, and Morehouse College (B.S., 1963), did graduate studies at Columbia University (1963–64), and earned an M.A. from the New School for Social Research in 1967.

His first book, published in 1968, was Black Awakening in Capitalist America: A Historical Analysis, and it was followed by several other notable titles, including Brotherman: The Odyssey of Black Men in America: An Anthology (1995), co-edited with Herb Boyd.

In the 1980s, Allen co-founded with Alice Walker the publishing company Wild Trees Press, publishing the work of Third World writers.

Allen married Pam Allen in 1965. He died at his home in Benicia, California, on July 10, 2024, at the age of 82.

== Works ==
- Black Awakening in Capitalist America: An Analytic History (1969)
- A Guide to Black Power in America: An Historical Analysis (1970)
- Reluctant Reformers: The Impact of Racism on Social Movement in the U.S. (1983)
- Brotherman: The Odyssey of Black Men in America (co-edited with Herb Boyd, 1995; reprinted 1996)
- Strong in the Struggle: My Life as a Black Labor Activist (with ILWU militant Lee Brown, 2001)
- Honoring Sergeant Carter: A Family's Journey to Uncover the Truth About an American Hero (with Allene G. Carter, 2004)
- The Port Chicago Mutiny: The Story of the Largest Mass Mutiny Trial in U.S. Naval History (Heyday Books, 1989, republished 2006).

== Awards ==
- Guggenheim Fellowship (1977)
- American Book Award (1995, with Herb Boyd) for Brotherman: The Odyssey of Black Men in America
- The Joseph Small Legacy Award (1998) of the Black Hollywood Education and Research Center. The award honors Port Chicago disaster survivor Joseph R. Small Jr., a member of The Port Chicago 50, who provided the narrative for the first chapter of The Port Chicago Mutiny.
- One of 12 honorees of the San Francisco Public Library's Long Walk to Freedom living-history exhibition (2003)

== See also ==
- Lián Amaris
- Stephan Aarstol
