= Herb Boyd =

American journalist (born 1938)

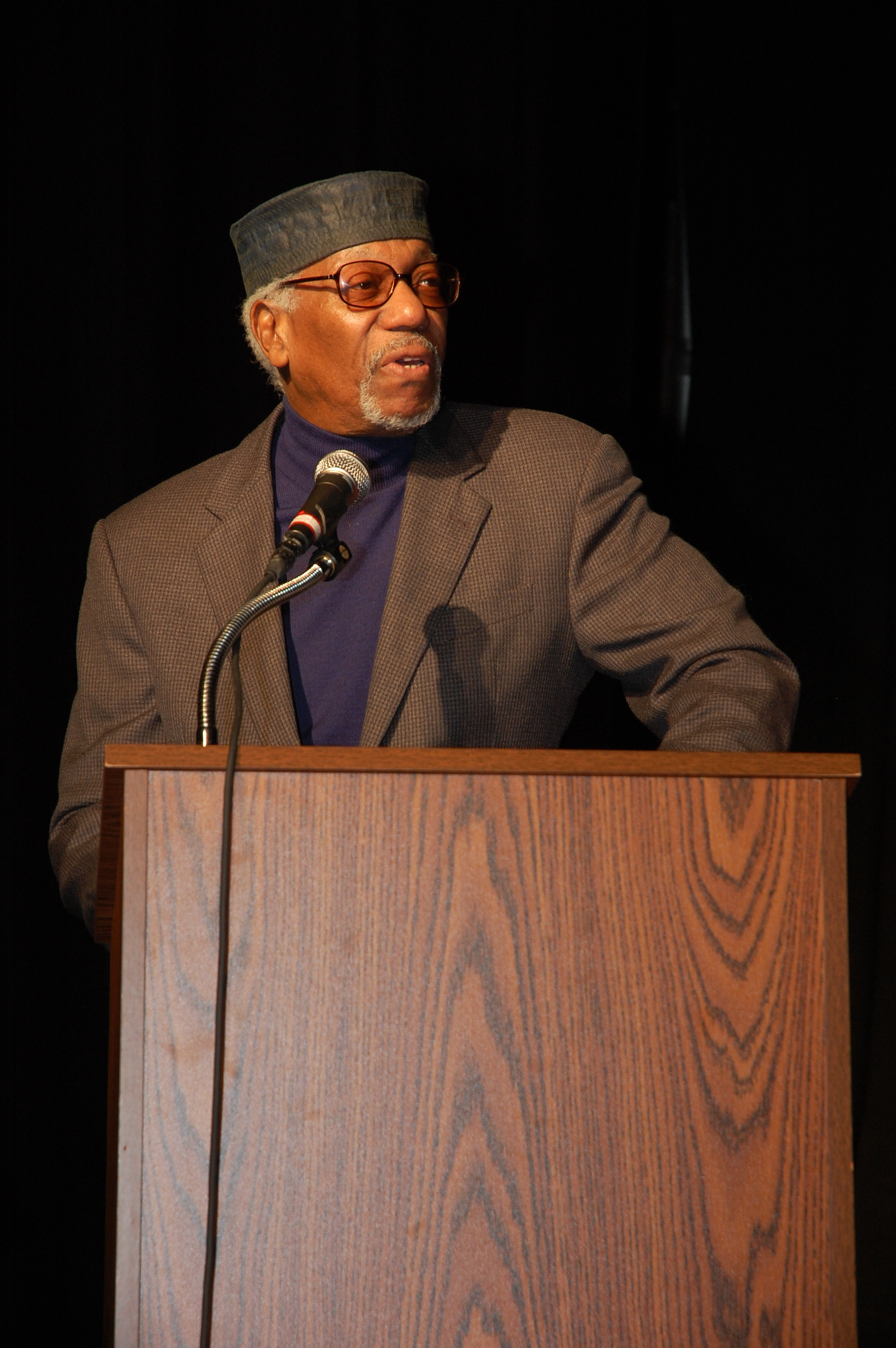
- Boyd speaking at the National Writers Union (NWU – UAW Local 1981) 30th anniversary celebration in NYC
- Born: November 1, 1938 (age 88); Birmingham, Alabama, U.S.
- Education: Wayne State University
- Occupations: Journalist, teacher, author, and activist
- Awards: American Book Award (1995)

Herb Boyd (born November 1, 1938) is an American journalist, teacher, author, and activist. His articles appear regularly in the New York Amsterdam News, where he has served as a columnist and reporter for nearly 42 years. He is a former teacher of black studies at Wayne State University in Detroit, Oberlin College in Ohio, the City College of New York and the College of New Rochelle. He has authored or edited 30 books, and his writing has appeared in national magazines and newspapers, in documentary scripts, and in media consultations.

== Early life and education ==
Herb Boyd was born in Birmingham, Alabama, and grew up in Detroit, Michigan. He earned a Ph.B. degree from Monteith College at Wayne State University (1965–1969), focusing in Anthropology and History. He later pursued graduate studies in Anthropology at Wayne State (1970–1972) and American Studies at the University of Iowa (1983).

He met Malcolm X in 1960 and credits him as an inspiration: "[Malcolm] set me on the path to become the writer-activist I am, to try to live up to the very ennobling things that he represented."

== Academic career ==
During the late 1960s, he helped establish the first black studies classes there and went on to teach at the university for 12 years. He also co-developed and instructed the initial curriculum in jazz studies at the Oberlin Conservatory. Boyd went on to teach at several institutions, serving as an instructor at the University of Iowa (1983), Marist College Bronx Campus (1989–1991), New York City Technical College (1990–1996), and the NYU Gallatin School (1999–2001). He was an adjunct professor at the College of New Rochelle's Manhattan Campus from 1985 to 2011 and an adjunct instructor of African American History and Culture at the City College of New York from 2005 to 2020.

== Journalism, media, and editorial work ==
In addition to the Amsterdam News, Boyd's work has been published in The Black Scholar, The City Sun, DownBeat, Emerge, and Essence. In 1980, he co-founded the Detroit Metro Times, serving as its Arts & Entertainment Editor until 1984. He has been recognized with awards from the National Association of Black Journalists and the New York Association of Black Journalists. In 2014, the National Association of Black Journalists inducted Boyd into its Hall of Fame.

Boyd co-edited, with Robert L. Allen, Brotherman: The Odyssey of Black Men in America, which was given the 1995 American Book Award. His 2004 media-fusion book, We Shall Overcome: The History of the Civil Rights Movement: As It Happened, accompanied by CDs narrated by Ossie Davis and Ruby Dee, was named Blackboard's Book of the Year in photography. Boyd's biography of James Baldwin, Baldwin's Harlem (2008), was nominated for an NAACP Image Award in 2009.

Boyd was managing editor of The Black World Today, a now-defunct online news service. Boyd has made broadcast appearances across national and international television outlets, including C-SPAN, Al Jazeera, The Dennis Miller Show, and Gil Noble's Like It Is. On radio, he has been a frequent guest on Pacifica Radio's WBAI, WBLS, and WLIB alongside host Imhotep Gary Byrd.

== Awards and honors ==
Boyd's early honors include a Wayne State University Board of Governors' Scholarship (1968), a Faculty Research Grant (1975), and arts recognition from the Michigan Council for the Arts and Detroit Council of the Arts (1977). In 1985, he received an award from the Institute for Alternative Journalism. In 2003, he was inducted into the International Literary Hall of Fame for Writers of African Descent, and he is also an inductee of the Madison Square Garden Hall of Fame as a journalist and author.

In 2018, Boyd was honored with the Outstanding Career Achievement Award at the James Aronson Social Justice Journalism Awards at Hunter College. Boyd credited his wife, writer and professor Elza Dinwiddie-Boyd, for editing his published books.

== Selected works ==
- African History for Beginners, For Beginners, 2007. ISBN 978-1-934389-18-8
- Autobiography of a People: Three Centuries of African-American History Told by Those Who Lived It (editor), Anchor Books, 2000. ISBN 978-0-385-49279-9
- Baldwin's Harlem: A Biography of James Baldwin, Atria, 2008. ISBN 978-0-7432-9307-5
- Black Detroit: A People's History of Self-Determination, Amistad Press, 2017. ISBN 978-0-06-234662-9
- Brotherman: The Odyssey of Black Men in America (co-editor with Robert L. Allen), One World/Ballantine, 1995. ISBN 978-0-345-37670-1
- By Any Means Necessary: Malcolm X: Real, Not Reinvented (co-editor with Ron Daniels, Maulana Karenga, and Haki R. Madhubuti), Third World Press, 2012. ISBN 978-0-88378-336-8
- Yusef Lateef; Herb Boyd (2005). The Gentle Giant: The Autobiography of Yusef Lateef. Morton Books Inc. ISBN 978-1929188123.
- We Shall Overcome: The History of the Civil Rights Movement as It Happened, Sourcebooks, 2004. ISBN 978-1-4022-0213-1
- Harlem Renaissance Redux, Third World Press, 2019. ISBN 978-0883783887
- Malcolm X, the CIA, and Other Blacks, Third World Press, 2025
