= WOW (EP) =

EP by Mouse on Mars
- Released: November 2, 2012
- Recorded: 2012
- Studio: Studio Paraverse 4, Berlin
- Genres: Wonky, IDM, footwork
- Length: 33:24
- Label: Monkeytown Records
- Producers: Jan St. Werner, Andi Toma

Mouse on Mars chronology
Parastrophics (2012)	WOW (2012)	21 Again (2014)

Professional ratings
Review scores
Source	Rating
AllMusic	3.5/5 stars
Pitchfork	7.0/10
Spectrum Culture	2.5/5 stars

WOW is an EP by German electronic music duo Mouse on Mars. It was released on Monkeytown Records in 2012.

== Production ==
According to its press release, WOW was recorded within "just a few weeks" and will offer a more "club-oriented counterpoint to [their previous album] Parastrophics". It features guest appearances from Dao Anh Khanh, Eric D. Clarke, and Las Kellies.

== Critical reception ==
Larry Fitzmaurice of Pitchfork gave the EP a 7.0 out of 10, saying, "WOW lacks the gut-punch energy of Parastrophics, but it's still an enjoyable twist on what else can be done with the already malleable world of bass music; once again Mouse on Mars refuse to stay in one place, but they almost always head somewhere interesting."

== Track listing ==
All tracks are written by Jan St. Werner and Andi Toma.

No.	Title	Length
1.	"SOS"	0:57
2.	"DOG"	3:51
3.	"HYM"	4:19
4.	"VAX"	3:30
5.	"PUN"	3:46
6.	"BSD"	0:19
7.	"ACD"	4:20
8.	"APE"	3:51
9.	"CAN"	4:19
10.	"ESO"	0:33
11.	"SUN"	3:00
12.	"WOC"	0:25
13.	"CAT"	0:17

== Personnel ==
Credits adapted from liner notes.

- Jan St. Werner – composition, production
- Andi Toma – composition, production
- Dao Anh Khanh – vocals (1, 6, 8, 12)
- Las Kellies – vocals (3)
- Eric D. Clarke – vocals (9)
