= Robert Chrisman =

American poet, activist and scholar (1937–2013)

- Born: May 28, 1937; Yuma, Arizona, United States
- Died: March 10, 2013 (aged 75); San Francisco, California, United States
- Education: University of California, Berkeley; San Francisco State University; University of Michigan
- Occupations: Writer; poet; critic; activist; scholar; editor; professor
- Known for: Founding editor and publisher of The Black Scholar

Robert Chrisman (May 28, 1937 – March 10, 2013) was a poet, scholar, and founding editor and publisher of The Black Scholar (TBS). Chrisman and the internationally acclaimed TBS "occupied the vanguard of the struggle for recognition of Black Studies as a serious academic endeavor."

== Early life and studies ==
Robert Chrisman was born on May 28, 1937, in Yuma, Arizona, and was raised near Nogales, Arizona. His parents had moved to Arizona from Chicago. Chrisman's father Alfred was an auto mechanic. His mother, Thelma Allimono, was a homemaker and later in life became a teacher. She was a daughter of W. D. Allimono, the first African-American certified public accountant.

In the 1950s, Chrisman's family moved to the Bay Area. He quickly became involved in the diverse San Francisco cultural scene. He studied literature in UC Berkeley's English department, under the mentorship of Josephine Miles. Independently, Chrisman discovered the works of Frederick Douglass, W. E. B. Du Bois, Langston Hughes, Richard Wright, Robert Hayden, James Baldwin, Lorraine Hansberry, Vladimir Lenin, Karl Marx, Che Guevara, Pablo Neruda, Mao Tse-tung, and the Beat Generation writers.

Chrisman graduated from UC Berkeley in 1958 with a BA degree in English Literature and a minor in Philosophy. In 1960, he obtained an MA in English Language Arts from San Francisco State University. Among his instructors at SF State were Herbert Blau, Mark Linenthal and James Schevill. Chrisman's MA thesis was a collection of poems that became the nucleus for his first book of poetry, Children of Empire (1981). Chrisman edited the college literary magazine, Transfer. His poem "Swan Lake", inspired by his then wife Gale Chrisman, received a Borestone Mountain Poetry Award and was published in its 15th annual issue, Best Poems of 1962 (1963). He obtained a PhD in English from the University of Michigan; his dissertation was a study of the Afro-modernist poet Robert Hayden.

== The Black Scholar ==
In November 1969, Chrisman co-founded The Black Scholar (TBS) with Nathan Hare and Allan Ross, a white printer and activist. The launching of TBS came in the wake of the 1968 historic strike at San Francisco State University, which involved thousands of students and faculty, including Chrisman and Hare, in a prolonged and sometimes violent struggle with the administration and the state. The strike, one of the longest of its kind in the US, lasted for five months and grew out of frustrations of black students and instructors who wanted the university to establish an independent Black Studies department.

These demands were eventually won but Chrisman paid a high price for the victory; he and Nathan Hare were fired from their teaching positions. Chrisman was reinstated but not in a tenure-track position. Disappointed with the way in which black struggles were being represented by the mainstream media, Chrisman, Hare, and Ross concluded an independent journal was needed. They determined to create an interdisciplinary journal to unite black street activists and academic intellectuals in common advocacy for the needs of the black community.

Although TBS was inspired by the Black Power and black student movements of the decade, it did not identify with a particular party. Chrisman has said that he and Hare felt that "...blacks were a pre-party state, for the various ideologies and groups that comprised the black movement had not forged a consensus or unity." Chrisman stated: "From the start, we believed every contributor should have her own style. We felt the black studies and new black power movement was yet to build its own language, its own terminology, its own style. So, we said, 'let a thousand flowers bloom. Let's have a lot of different styles.'"

In regards to Chrisman's impact, Robert L. Allen, the long-term Senior Editor of TBS and close friend of Chrisman, stated,

I know of no one who has worked harder than Robert Chrisman to actualize an intellectual vision. In building TBS he demonstrated the power of the principles of self-determination and self-reliance. He built the journal not by relying on grants and funding from foundations and government agencies, but by relying on the people we serve – teachers, students, community activists, labor activists, writers and artists, librarians, academicians, and just plain working people – our subscribers. These folks have shown that they have the power to sustain an intellectual enterprise and keep it independent. Chrisman believed that by relying on community support TBS could be self determining. For over forty years Robert Chrisman's strategic vision enabled TBS to make a path where there was none before.

== Career in academia ==
In addition to his writing and editing, Chrisman maintained a long career in academia. He taught a variety of courses in literature, creative writing, cultural studies, and black studies at institutions that include the University of Hawaii, Honolulu, University of San Francisco, University of Michigan, Williams College, UC Berkeley, University of Vermont, and Wayne State University.

In 2005, he retired as Professor and Chair of the Black Studies Department at the University of Nebraska Omaha (UNO). Among the initiatives he developed while at UNO was the creation of an annual Malcolm X Festival in Omaha, the city where Malcolm X was born.

== Poetry ==
Described as "a poet worthy of praise and wider recognition", Chrisman published three volumes of poetry:

- The Dirty Wars. San Francisco: The Black Scholar Press, 2012, Print. ISBN 978-0-578-08767-2
- Minor Casualties: New and Selected Poems. Detroit: Lotus Press, 1993. Print. ISBN 978-0-916418-82-3
- Children of Empire. Sausalito: The Black Scholar Press, 1981. Print. ISBN 0-933296-02-9

His poems were published in Occident, Transfer, Contact, Plural, Galley Sail Review, Berkeley Review, Callaloo, Wasafiri, South and West, Mexico Quarterly Review, Frisco, The Black Scholar, and elsewhere. Chrisman used poetry as one of the primary forms through which to express his vision. As a poet, he experimented with a broad range of styles and subject matter, while maintaining a modernist poetics characterized by formal rigor and lyrical density.

Chrisman often explores the human consequences of empires both ancient and modern, highlighting local and international perspectives (as in "Children of Empire", CE; "Perfectly Normal", "Goyescas", and "Joseph", MC; "The Road to Basra" and "Leviathan", TDW). Of such poems Andrew Salkey wrote: "The statement poems are all politically engaged [and] morally committed to anti-imperialist discourse and Third World revolutionary aspirations but mindful of the demands of poetic technique and prosodic practice." US popular culture prompts Chrisman's poetic reflections on the operations of collective fantasy ("Carnival II", CE; "Chaplin", TDW). Satire runs across his opus, targeting Afrocentrism ("The Wiz" and "Field Nigguh Blues", MC) as well as the black bourgeoisie ("Lexus Blues", TDW). Deeply engaged with material environment, Chrisman's explorations of urban and wild spaces interweave physical and social observation ("The Birds", CE; "Ghost Dance", MC; "Emerald City" and The Stranded Grebe", TDW). In archetypes and narratives from Greek and Roman mythology, Chrisman finds powerful existential motifs ("Philoctetes", CE; "Perseus' Blues" and "Procne is Among the Slaves", TDW). Other poems chart love and passionate intimacy ("Songs for A.M.", CE; "Scottish Spring" and "Fugata", MC; "Rainsong", TDW), alienation, loss and suffering ("The Metal Heart", CE; "Cicatrice", MC; "Shibui" and "Carmen's Ghost", TDW), and sexual politics ("Mother of the Movement" and "Letter to a Feminist", TDW). Chrisman frequently wrote elegies ("My Father's Mittens") and celebrations of friendship ("At Maya and Paul's", CE; "Los Naranjos", TDW). Chrisman's creative writing has gained recognition from critics and other poets, including Alice Walker and James Baldwin, who described Chrisman as "a very beautiful poet; it is another sound. Something. Else."

== Essays and scholarship ==
Chrisman's other books include four major edited anthologies of writings from TBS. These are:

- The Obama Phenomenon: Toward a Multiracial Democracy. Henry, Charles P., Robert L. Allen and Robert Chrisman, eds. Champaign: University of Illinois Press, 2011. Print. ISBN 0-252-07822-5
- Court of Appeal: The Black Community Speaks out on the Racial and Sexual Politics of Clarence Thomas vs. Anita Hill. The Black Scholar ed. New York: Ballantine Books, 1992. Print. ISBN 0-345-58136-9
- Contemporary Black Thought: The Best of The Black Scholar. Chrisman, Robert, and Nathan Hare, eds. Indianapolis: Bobbs-Merrill, 1974. Print. ISBN 0-672-51821-X
- Pan-Africanism. Chrisman, Robert, and Nathan Hare, eds. Indianapolis: Bobbs-Merrill, 1972. Print. ISBN 0-672-51869-4

In 2001, Chrisman co-edited with Laurence Goldstein the anthology Robert Hayden: Essays on the Poetry (Ann Arbor: University of Michigan Press). Additionally, Chrisman was a prolific essayist who covered a wide range of subject material, from black incarceration and global political struggles to the literary genre of the slave narrative. His many essays include:

- "Globalization and the Media Industry", The Black Scholar 38.2 (2008)
- "Black Studies, the Talented Tenth, and the Organic Intellectual", The Black Scholar 35.2 (2005)
- "The Slave Narrative: Its Influence Upon Black Publishing and Literature", Black Renaissance/Renaissance Noire 3.3 (2001)
- "Nicolas Guillen, Langston Hughes, and the Black American / Afro-Cuban Connection", Michigan Quarterly Review. 33.4 (1994)
- "Nuclear Policy, Social Justice, and the Third World", The Black Scholar 14.6 (1983)
- "The Role of Mass Media in US Imperialism", The Black Scholar 14. 3–4 (1983)
- "Cuba: Forge of the Revolution", The Black Scholar 11.6 (1980)
- "Blacks, Racism, and Bourgeois Culture", College English 38.8 (1977)
- "Aspects of Pan Africanism", The Black Scholar, 4. 10 (1973)
- "Black Prisoners: White Law", The Black Scholar 2.8 (1971)
- "The Formation of a Revolutionary Black Culture", The Black Scholar 1.8 (1970)
- "The Crisis of Harold Cruse", The Black Scholar 1.1 (1969)

== Death ==
Robert Chrisman died on March 10, 2013, at his home in San Francisco of complications from congestive heart failure. He was 75. He is survived by his daughter, Laura Chrisman.
