= Parastrophics =

Studio album by Mouse on Mars
- Released: February 28, 2012
- Recorded: 2007–2011
- Studios: St. Martin Tonstudio, Düsseldorf; Paraverse 4, Berlin
- Genres: IDM, wonky
- Length: 46:14
- Label: Monkeytown
- Producers: Jan St. Werner, Andi Toma

Mouse on Mars chronology
Varcharz (2006)	Parastrophics (2012)	WOW (2012)

Singles from Parastrophics
- 1. "They Know Your Name" Released: 2012

Parastrophics is a studio album by German electronica duo Mouse on Mars. It was released by Monkeytown Records in 2012.

== Critical reception ==
Professional ratings
Aggregate scores
Source	Rating
Metacritic	74/100
Review scores
Source	Rating
AllMusic	4/5 stars
Clash	8/10
Pitchfork	8.2/10
PopMatters	6/10 stars
Resident Advisor	3.5/5
Rolling Stone	3.5/5 stars
The Skinny	4/5 stars
Spin	7/10

At Metacritic, which assigns a weighted average score out of 100 to reviews from mainstream critics, Parastrophics received an average score of 74% based on 22 reviews, indicating "generally favorable reviews".

Heather Phares of AllMusic called it "an album that's a rebirth and a welcome return for one of electronic music's most restlessly creative acts." Matthew Perpetua of Rolling Stone gave the album 3.5 stars out of 5, describing it as "a surreal pop record that gleefully warps the tones and inflections of modern radio tunes into funhouse mirror abstractions."

PopMatters placed it at number 4 on the "Best Electronic Music of 2012" list, as well as number 10 on the "Top 10 Pleasant Surprise Albums of 2012" list.

== Track listing ==
No.	Title	Length
1.	"The Beach Stop"	3:23
2.	"Chordblocker, Cinnamon Toasted"	3:12
3.	"Metrotopy"	3:45
4.	"Wienuss"	3:42
5.	"They Know Your Name"	3:54
6.	"Syncropticians"	5:53
7.	"Cricket"	2:13
8.	"iMatch"	4:53
9.	"Polaroyced"	3:12
10.	"Gearknot Cherry"	2:59
11.	"Bruised to Imwimper"	0:43
12.	"Baku Hipster"	3:07
13.	"Seaqz"	5:18

== Personnel ==
Credits adapted from liner notes.

- Jan St. Werner – writing, lyrics (5)
- Andi Toma – writing, lyrics (5)
- Dodo Nkishi – lyrics (3, 5)
- Ya Tosiba – lyrics, vocals (12)
- Esther Grimaldi – vocals (1)
- Steven Jo – vocals (2)
