= Black Awakening in Capitalist America =

Social sciences book by Robert L. Allen

- Author: Robert L. Allen
- Language: English
- Genre: History
- Publisher: Doubleday
- Publication date: 1969
- Media type: Print
- Pages: 251
- ISBN: 9780385077187

Black Awakening in Capitalist America is a 1969 social sciences and history book by American scholar Robert L. Allen that analyzes the experience of Black residents of the United States as that of a colonized nation within a nation. Allen primarily analyzes Black organizing in the 1960s and often draws from the work of Frantz Fanon.

== Summary ==
Allen focuses on Black activism in the United States following the Civil Rights Movement and details how corporate interests and White-led power structures co-opted and de-radicalized Black Power and Black nationalism. Allen cites the Ford Foundation funding of the Congress of Racial Equality as an example of how Black-led movements are influenced to align with the interest of more mainstream organizations. Allen further explores this idea through the response to the 1967 Newark riots and critiques Black leaders who focused on electoral representation instead of systemic change for communities. As part of his analysis of potential avenues for change he also stridently critiques Black capitalism as a method for social change. N. D. B. Connolly, an American historian and professor writes:

For Allen, the most unjust characteristics of the country's economy—chronic African American underemployment, housing segregation, police brutality, the expansion of corporate power, and the gaping and growing chasm between the wealthy and everyone else—existed for two reasons: (1) the crushing power of white capital and (2) the willingness of black chiefs to broker land and influence with whites as part of the more general workings of capitalism.

== Legacy ==
Black Awakening has been described as "seminal" and "groundbreaking" in the field of Internal Colonialism Theory, and as "the most incisive application of Internal Colonialism Theory to African America." It has also been described as "important" for its examination of Black capitalism. Despite being well-received at its original publication, Allen's work grew neglected as Internal Colonialism Theory lost prominence after the 1970s.

In 2009, an academic conference was held in Berkeley, California to commemorate the forty-year legacy of the book. Allen's work was described as "an often neglected, yet unfortunately all-too timely, work in addressing twenty-first century concerns."

Incite! includes an excerpt of Black Awakening in Capitalist America as a chapter in The Revolution Will Not be Funded (2017).
