= Instrumentals (Mouse on Mars album) =

Studio album by Mouse on Mars
- Released: 13 October 1997
- Recorded: 1995–1997
- Genres: IDM, ambient, experimental
- Length: 51:28
- Label: Sonig
- Producers: Jan St. Werner; Andi Toma

Mouse on Mars chronology
Autoditacker (1997)	Instrumentals (1997)	Glam (1998)

Instrumentals is the fourth studio album by German electronica duo Mouse on Mars. It was originally released by Sonig in 1997 on vinyl and was later reissued by Domino Recording Company and Thrill Jockey on CD in 2000.

== Critical reception ==
Professional ratings
Review scores
Source	Rating
AllMusic	4.5/5 stars
Alternative Press	4/5
The Encyclopedia of Popular Music	4/5 stars
Melody Maker	3.5/5 stars
Muzik	3/5
Pitchfork	9.0/10

Sean Cooper of AllMusic called Instrumentals Mouse on Mars' "most enjoyable and consistent effort." He stated that Instrumentals profiled "the group's more relaxed, experimental side, working tracks up out of a mush of warm, sputtery electronics and vaguely bouncing rhythms.

== Track listing ==
All tracks are written by Jan St. Werner and Andi Toma.

No.	Title	Length
1.	"Auto Orchestra"	3:07
2.	"Owai"	9:20
3.	"Chromantic"	5:59
4.	"Pegel Gesetzt"	10:00
5.	"Rompatroullie"	6:55
6.	"1001"	7:08
7.	"Subnubus"	9:34

=== Japanese Version Bonus Track ===
No.	Title	Length
8.	"Creolian Saphire"	5:12

== Personnel ==
Credits adapted from liner notes.

Mouse on Mars

- Jan St. Werner – music
- Andi Toma – music
