= Marina Rosenfeld =

- Origin: New York, United States
- Genres: Experimental; Avant-Garde; Sound art Sound sculpture sound installation
- Years active: 1993–present
- Labels: Room40, iDEAL, Charhizma, Innova, Softl

Marina Rosenfeld is an American composer, sound artist and visual artist based in New York City. Her work has been produced and presented by the Park Avenue Armory, Museum of Modern Art, Portikus (Frankfurt), Donaueschinger Musiktage, and such international surveys as documenta 14 and the Montreal, Liverpool, PERFORMA, and Whitney biennials, among many others. She has performed widely as an improvising turntablist, and served as co-chair of Music/Sound in the MFA program at the Milton Avery School of the Arts, Bard College, from 2007 to 2020. She has also taught at Harvard, Yale, Brooklyn College, and Dartmouth.

== Early life and education ==
Born in New York, NY, in 1968, she moved with her family to New Jersey at a young age. Rosenfeld graduated from Harvard University in 1991 with an AB in music and then attended California Institute of the Arts, where she received an MFA in fine arts and music in 1994. At CalArts, her teachers included Michael Asher, Charles Gaines, Morton Subotnick, Tom Lawson, and Lucky Moscow.

== Work and career ==
Rosenfeld's first major work was the Sheer Frost Orchestra (1993). Scored for 17 women with 17 guitars and amplifiers, the piece directs its participants via a graphic score to manipulate nail polish bottles in a series of one-fisted choreographic actions: drop, hop, drone, slide, or scratch across the instrument. Sheer Frost Orchestra has been mounted in Los Angeles (Los Angeles Contemporary Exhibitions), San Francisco (Mills College), London (Tate Modern), New York City (Greene Naftali; Whitney Museum of American Art), Cleveland (Cleveland Museum of Art), Chicago (Sexing Sound Symposium); and Innsbruck (Kunstraum Innsbruck).

WHITE LINES (2003–12) is a multi-channel installation consisting of live-action video projections bisected by pairs of animated white lines that fluctuate in width and opacity. Live, improvising musicians have performed these “scores” in Vienna, Perth, New York, Rome, Tbilisi, and Barcelona, among other locations.

Teenage Lontano was Rosenfeld's contribution to the 2008 Whitney Biennial, a "cover version" of composer György Ligeti's 1967 orchestral work Lontano, reconfigured as a choral composition for teenagers. In performance, a choir of teenagers sings along to a suite of 17 different vocal scores heard via earphones and mp3 players. Teenage Lontano has been re-staged in Slovenia, Holland, Australia and Norway, and an installation version has also been exhibited at Tou-Scene (Stavanger, Sweden), the James Gallery (CUNY Graduate Center, New York), and the Cleveland Museum of Contemporary Art. In his review of the 2008 premiere, New York magazine's art critic, Jerry Saltz, wrote, "Watching this piece, I felt the opening of a portal between a failed utopian past and the possibility that the more real present is already something to love. I was transported."

Rosenfeld composed Cannons for four large, resonating “bass cannons” (steel pipes fitted with subwoofers), 2 oversized horn-and-driver pairs, and ensemble (percussion, viola, cello and the composer on turntables) in resonant space. Ranging from one to seven meters long, the cannons were capable of reproducing bass frequencies with unusual fidelity. The concert portion of the work was approximately 30 minutes. It was commissioned in 2010 by UK festival Faster Than Sound, and has also been produced in Australia at the Midlands Railway Workshops, by Ensemble Decibel and Festival THNM/Tura New Music.

The work roygbiv&b constituted Rosenfeld's contribution to the exhibition “Instructions Lab” at the Museum of Modern Art (NY) in 2011. A punning gloss on spectral composition, the work uses the figure of the rainbow to project sound vertically in an architecture; it requires a custom loudspeaker installation and battery of live performers, which have included teenagers, amateur choirs, double basses, and brass. This piece was also mounted at the South London Gallery in 2014 and at the Serralves Museum & Foundation, (Porto, Portugal), in 2011, in a version called “Rainbow Gathering.” In performance, musicians read a score that employs homonyms on the first letters of the colors of the rainbow (red, “are”; blue, “be”; orange, “oh”; yellow, “why”; etc.)

Six Inversions (After Arnold Schoenberg), of 2013, is a two-channel video work that was commissioned by the Arnold Schoenberg Center in Vienna. Rosenfeld applies the Schoenbergian method of inversion to video scenes recorded in Schoenberg's home and archive, in which collaborator Anthony Coleman improvises on Schoenberg ephemera (sketches, notes, fragments, and so on). The work later appeared in Rosenfeld's solo show, “After Notation,” at the Bard Center for Curatorial Studies at Bard College in 2017.

Rosenfeld wrote Free Exercise in 2014 for a mixed ensemble of military and experimental musicians. Premiered at the Borealis Festival in Bergen, Norway, a version of the work was also mounted in 2016 for the Biennale de Montreal. Free Exercise employs large-format score materials and choreographed formations to stage moments of unison and disunison among the military regimental band and a looser collective of improvising musicians.

For a 2017 solo show at Kunsthalle Portikus, Rosenfeld developed Deathstar. An installation with a performance component, the work hung a multi-microphone array from the high ceiling of the gallery. The array recorded continuously during the four weeks of the show, routing its signal through live-processing computer software and then back out into the space, with variable delays, through four loudspeakers. She also added pre-recorded soundfiles to the mix. During the course of the show, Rosenfeld transcribed the sounds of installation into notation for solo piano, which was performed by Marino Formenti for five hours at the close of the exhibition. At Musiktage Donaueschinger 2017, Rosenfeld premiered Deathstar Orchestration, a new version of the work for Ensemble Musikfabrik, with Formenti again as the soloist.

In 2024, Rosenfeld collaborated with scholar Louis Chude-Sokei on her audio and performance art installation "µ (mu)" at the Curtis R. Priem Experimental Media and the Performing Arts Center in New York and the Gwangju Biennale in South Korea in 2024.

She has composed or improvised music for such choreographers as Merce Cunningham, Maria Hassabi, and Ralph Lemon.

== Improvisation and turntablism ==
Rosenfeld has performed extensively as an improviser on turntables. She has performed with Ikue Mori, George Lewis, Philip Jeck, Otomo Yoshihide, Okkyung Lee, Sonic Youth, DJ Olive, the Rova Saxophone quartet, Christian Marclay, Andrew Cyrille, Nels Cline, Tony Conrad, Mattin, and Ken Vandermark, among many others.

== Awards and recognition ==
Rosenfeld's work has been reviewed or discussed in the New York Times, the New Yorker, The Wire, New York, the Guardian, Neue Zürcher Zeitung, Signal to Noise, Bomb, Artforum, The Independent (London), Dusted, ArtNews, Frieze, TimeOut New York, Der Bund, Elle, San Francisco Chronicle, Los Angeles Times, and a host of other publications. Seth Kim-Cohen discusses her work in In the Blink of an Ear, as does Caleb Kelly in Gallery Sound.

Rosenfeld has received grants and residencies from the Foundation for Contemporary Arts, the New York State Council on the Arts, Swedish Electronic Music Studios, New York Foundation for the Arts, Park Avenue Armory, Whitney Museum, STEIM (Amsterdam), and Yerba Buena Center for the Arts (San Francisco).

She is a recipient of The Watermill Center's 2019 Inga Maren Otto Fellowship.

In 2024, she was awarded the Herb Alpert Award in the Arts for Visual Art.

Her writing was included in the second edition of Audio Cultures: Readings in Modern Music (2017), edited by Christoph Cox and Dan Warner, and in John Zorn's Arcana 2: Musicians on Music (2007).

== Discography ==
Feel Anything with Ben Vida (2019, iDEAL Recordings/Gothenburg)

P.A./HARD LOVE (2013, Room40/Sydney), with Okkyung Lee and Annette Henry a.k.a. Warrior Queen

Sour Mash, collaboration with George Lewis (2010, Innova/Minneapolis)

Plastic Materials (2009, Room40/Sydney)

joy of fear (2006, Softl/Cologne), with Okkyung Lee, cello

DJTrio appearance with Christian Marclay, Erik M and Toshio Kajiawara (Asphodel, San Francisco, 2003)

the sheer frost orchestra: hop, drop, drone, slide, scratch and A for anything (2001, Charhizma/Vienna)

a water’s wake, collaboration with Tim Barnes and Toshio Kajiwara (Quakebasket, NY, 2001)

theforestthegardenthesea: music from Fragment opera (1999, Charhizma/Vienna), producer Mayo Thompson
