= Radical Connector =

Studio album by Mouse on Mars
- Released: August 24, 2004
- Genre: IDM, post-rock, glitch pop
- Length: 53:43
- Label: Thrill Jockey, Sonig
- Producer: Jan St. Werner, Andi Toma

Mouse on Mars chronology
Idiology (2001)	Radical Connector (2004)	Live 04 (2005)

Singles from Radical Connector
- 1. "Wipe That Sound" Released: 2004

Radical Connector is a studio album by German electronica duo Mouse on Mars. It was released in 2004. It features vocal contributions from Dodo Nkishi and Niobe.

== Critical reception ==
Professional ratings
Aggregate scores
Source	Rating
Metacritic	75/100
Review scores
Source	Rating
AllMusic	4.5/5 stars
Exclaim!	unfavorable
Pitchfork	8.1/10
PopMatters	mixed
Stylus Magazine	C+
Tiny Mix Tapes	3.5/5 stars

At Metacritic, which assigns a weighted average score out of 100 to reviews from mainstream critics, Radical Connector received an average score of 75% based on 21 reviews, indicating "generally favorable reviews".

Heather Phares of AllMusic said: "This may not be Mouse on Mars' most ambitious album, but it's among the group's most successful -- it's not at all difficult to feel a connection to this truly intelligent dance music." Mark Richardson of Pitchfork gave the album an 8.1 out of 10, describing it as "Mouse on Mars' most conventional album" and "their most predictable in structure." Meanwhile, Kareem Estefan of Stylus Magazine gave the album a grade of C+, saying: "Even if it doesn't advance from Idiology as much as its lengthy development might imply, Radical Connector proves that ten years into the game, Jan St. Werner and Andi Toma still have no intention to repeat themselves."

== Track listing ==
No.	Title	Length
1.	"Mine Is in Yours"	4:53
2.	"Wipe That Sound"	4:11
3.	"Spaceship"	4:58
4.	"Send Me Shivers"	6:05
5.	"Blood Comes"	5:11
6.	"The End"	5:11
7.	"Detected Beats"	5:17
8.	"All the Old Powers"	4:28
9.	"Evoke an Object"	8:11

Japanese edition bonus track
No.	Title	Length
10.	"Ravolver"	4:39

== Personnel ==
Credits adapted from liner notes.

- Jan St. Werner – words, music, production
- Andi Toma – words, music, production
- Jupp Götz – choir (1)
- Dodo Nkishi – words (1, 2, 5, 7, 8)
- Niobe – words (3, 4, 6, 9)
