= Dimensional People =

Studio album by Mouse on Mars
- Released: April 13, 2018
- Recorded: 2016–2017
- Studios: April Base, Wisconsin; Overload Michelberger, Berlin; Paraverse 4, Berlin
- Genres: Electronic; experimental; footwork; nu jazz; electroacoustic; 21st-century classical; glitch; wonky
- Length: 43:46
- Label: Thrill Jockey
- Producers: Jan St. Werner, Andi Toma

Mouse on Mars chronology
21 Again (2014)	Dimensional People (2018)	AAI (2021)

Professional ratings
Aggregate scores
Source	Rating
Metacritic	71/100
Review scores
Source	Rating
Drowned in Sound	6/10
Pitchfork	7.6/10

Dimensional People is the eleventh studio album by German electronica group Mouse on Mars. The 2018 album aims to be one orchestra piece letting musicians express freely instrumentally or vocally and features more than 50 collaborators including Justin Vernon of Bon Iver, The National's Aaron and Bryce Dessner, Spank Rock and Zach Condon of Beirut.

Most of the album was recorded in 2017 in the studio April Base in Wisconsin.

== Release ==
Mouse on Mars debuted Dimensional People at an academic conference at the Massachusetts Institute of Technology in March 2018 and released the album via Thrill Jockey on 13 April 2018 on CD and vinyl. The first single off the album, released in January, was "Dimensional People III", featuring Justin Vernon.

== Reception ==
At Metacritic, which assigns a weighted average score out of 100 to reviews from mainstream critics, Dimensional People received an average score of 71% based on 10 reviews, indicating "generally favorable reviews".

=== Accolades ===
Accolades for Dimensional People
Publication	Accolade	Rank
The Quietus	The Quietus' Top 100 Albums of 2018	34

== Live performances ==
August 24, 2018 - Elbphilharmonie, Hamburg, Germany

February 9th 2019 - Musica nova, Helsinki, Finland with Moritz Simon Geist and Tyondai Braxton

October. 2019 - 43. Leipziger Jazztage, Leipzig, Germany

== Track listing ==
All tracks written and composed by Jan St. Werner and Andi Toma, except where noted.

Side one
No.	Title	Writer(s)	Length
1.	"Dimensional People Part I"		4:00
2.	"Dimensional People Part II"		4:56
3.	"Dimensional People Part III"		3:48
4.	"Foul Mouth"	Amanda Blank, Toma, St. Werner	3:10
5.	"Aviation"	Amanda Blank, Spank Rock, Toma, St. Werner	1:56
6.	"Parliament of Aliens Part I"	Sam Amidon, Toma, St. Werner	4:39

Side two
No.	Title	Writer(s)	Length
7.	"Daylight"	Eric D. Clarke, Toma, St. Werner	5:45
8.	"Tear to My Eye"	Eric D. Clarke, Toma, St. Werner	2:17
9.	"Parliament of Aliens Part II"		4:27
10.	"Parliament of Aliens Part III"		0:33
11.	"Resumé"	Swamp Dogg, Toma, St. Werner	5:02
12.	"Sidney in a Cup"	Zach Condon, Lola Ridge, Toma, St. Werner	3:13

== Personnel ==
- Sam Amidon – violin, voices
- Michelberger Bar – ambience
- JT Bates – drums
- Amanda Blank – voices
- Helen Bledsoe – flute
- Michinori Bunya – double bass
- C.J. Camerieri – trumpet
- Christine Chapman – French horn
- Eric D. Clarke – piano, voices
- Bruce Collings – trombone
- Zach Condon – engineering, voices
- Phil Cooks – banjo
- Aaron Dessner – guitar
- Bryce Dessner – guitar, string arrangements
- DJ Delish – DJ
- April Base Frogs – ambience
- Matti Gajek – electronics
- Moritz Simon Geist – electronic accordion
- Sam Greens – engineer
- Trever Hagen – trumpet
- Lisa Hannigan – voices
- Patrick Hetherington – guitar, voices
- Noah Hill – voices
- Azar Kazimir – art direction
- Benjamin Kobler – piano
- Max Köhrich – mastering
- Ben Lanz – trombone
- Ben Lester – pedal steel
- Mike Lewis – saxophone
- Dirk Leyers – engineer
- Matthew McCaughan – percussion
- Michael Rauter – cello
- Rob Moose – violin
- Zach Morgan – engineer
- Nathan Plante – trumpet
- Melvyn Poore – tuba
- Axel Porath – viola
- Dirk Rothbrust – percussion
- Anatole Serret – voices
- Spank Rock – vocals
- Louie Swain – piano, voices
- Swamp Dogg – voices
- Andi Toma – bass, drums, electronics, guitar, piano, processing
- Justin Vernon – guitar, voices
- Hannah Weirich – violin
- Jan St. Werner – electronics, harmonica, piano, processing, voices
- Dirk Wietheger – continuo violoncello
