= Idiology =

Studio album by Mouse on Mars
- Released: April 24, 2001
- Genre: IDM, electronica, post-rock, ambient
- Length: 49:20
- Label: Domino, Thrill Jockey, Sonig
- Producer: Jan St. Werner, Andi Toma

Mouse on Mars chronology
| Niun Niggung (1999) | Idiology (2001) | Agit Itter It It (2001) |

Singles from Idiology
- 1. "Actionist Respoke" Released: 2001

Professional ratings
Aggregate scores
| Source | Rating |
|---|---|
| Metacritic | 83/100 |
Review scores
| Source | Rating |
| AllMusic | 4.5/5 stars |
| Pitchfork | 9.6/10 |
| PopMatters | favorable |

Idiology is the seventh studio album by German electronica duo Mouse on Mars. It was released on April 24, 2001 and features contributions from a diverse group of musicians. The album was critically acclaimed, with The A.V. Club describing it as a “reassuringly wild and diverse set of organic electronica” with “soundscapes that blur the line between programming and live musicianship.”

A related EP entitled Agit Itter It It was released in November 2001, featuring additional tracks and live versions of "Actionist Respoke" and/or “Introduce,” depending on the version. The bonus tracks found on the Japanese and UK editions of Idiology are from Pickly Dred Rhizzoms, an EP released in 1999.

== Critical reception ==
At Metacritic, which assigns a weighted average score out of 100 to reviews from mainstream critics, Idiology received an average score of 83% based on 14 reviews, indicating "universal acclaim".

Pitchfork gave Idiology a score of 9.6, and ranked it at number 12 on the "Top 20 Albums of 2001" list.

== Track listing ==
| No. | Title | Length |
|---|---|---|
| 1. | "Actionist Respoke" | 4:57 |
| 2. | "Subsequence" | 5:18 |
| 3. | "Presence" | 4:49 |
| 4. | "The Illking" | 3:16 |
| 5. | "Catching Butterflies with Hands" | 5:23 |
| 6. | "Doit" | 5:16 |
| 7. | "First : Break" | 5:16 |
| 8. | "Introduce" | 5:03 |
| 9. | "Unity Concepts" | 1:41 |
| 10. | "Paradical" | 2:29 |
| 11. | "Fantastic Analysis" | 5:52 |

Japanese / UK edition bonus tracks
| No. | Title | Length |
|---|---|---|
| 12. | "Tape Me Baby" | 4:16 |
| 13. | "Stuffed Funk" | 4:47 |

== Personnel ==
Credits adapted from liner notes.

- Jan St. Werner – composition, production, lyrics
- Andi Toma – composition, production, lyrics
- Dodo Nkishi – vocals, lyrics
- Matti Rouse – vocals
- Harald Sack Ziegler – French horn, trumpet
- Peter Stahlhofen – trumpet
- Isolde Hermanns – clarinet, bass clarinet
- Miriam Hardenberg – cello
- Sebastian Reimann – violin
- Hartmut Frank – viola
- Matthew Herbert – piano
- Alois Andre – guitar
- Josef Höltgen – bass guitar, double bass
- Uli Thiesz – drums
- Adam Butler – electronics
- F.X.Randomiz – programming
