= Live 04 =

Live album by Mouse on Mars
- Released: October 11, 2005
- Genre: IDM
- Length: 56:08
- Label: Sonig
- Producer: Jan St. Werner, Andi Toma

Mouse on Mars chronology
Radical Connector (2004)	Live 04 (2005)	Varcharz (2006)

Professional ratings
Review scores
Source	Rating
AllMusic	4/5 stars
Pitchfork	8.0/10
Spin	favorable
XLR8R	favorable

Live 04 is a live album by German electronica duo Mouse on Mars. It was released on Sonig in 2005.

== Critical reception ==
Heather Phares of AllMusic gave the album 4 stars out of 5, saying, "while it's still not quite the same as seeing Mouse on Mars in concert, that it manages to capture even a fraction of the atmosphere and sweat of their shows makes it potent stuff indeed." Mark Richardson of Pitchfork gave the album an 8.0 out of 10, describing it as "a soundtrack to a raucous little party."

== Track listing ==
All lyrics are written by Dodo Nkishi, Jan St. Werner, and Andi Toma; all music is composed by St. Werner and Toma

No.	Title	Length
1.	"Mine Is in Yours"	5:28
2.	"Diskdusk"	5:15
3.	"All the Old Powers"	5:48
4.	"Distroia"	4:14
5.	"Twift"	6:22
6.	"Gogonal"	6:43
7.	"Wipe That Sound"	7:15
8.	"Actionist Respoke"	6:04
9.	"Frosch"	8:54

Enhanced CD edition bonus video
No.	Title	Length
1.	"Wipe That Sound"

== Personnel ==
Credits adapted from liner notes.

- Jan St. Werner – keyboards, electronics
- Andi Toma – bass guitar, electronics
- Dodo Nkishi – drums, vocals
