= Vulvaland =

Studio album by Mouse on Mars
- Released: 1994
- Recorded: 1994
- Studio: Academy of St. Martin in the Streets
- Genres: IDM; ambient; electronica
- Length: 73:02
- Label: Too Pure
- Producers: Jan St. Werner; Andi Toma

Mouse on Mars chronology
Vulvaland (1994)	Iaora Tahiti (1995)

Singles from Vulvaland
- 1. "Frosch" Released: 1994

Vulvaland is the debut studio album by German electronica duo Mouse on Mars. It was released in 1994.

== Critical reception ==
Professional ratings
Review scores
Source	Rating
AllMusic	4/5 stars
The Encyclopedia of Popular Music	4/5 stars

Sean Cooper of AllMusic described Vulvaland as "a wibbly, barely digital match of ambient texturology with experimental strains of techno, dub, and Krautrock."

In 2015, Fact included Vulvaland on its list of "21 Essential Records from Cologne's 90s Renaissance".

== Track listing ==
All tracks are written by Jan St. Werner and Andi Toma.

No.	Title	Length
1.	"Frosch"	9:18
2.	"Elli im Wunderland"	5:28
3.	"Uah"	6:59
4.	"Chagrin"	6:14
5.	"Future Dub"	7:32
6.	"Die Seele von Brian Wilson"	7:43
7.	"Katang"	29:47

== Personnel ==
Credits adapted from liner notes.

Mouse on Mars

- Jan St. Werner – composition, arrangement, production
- Andi Toma – composition, arrangement, production
