= Mouse on Mars =

German electronic music duo

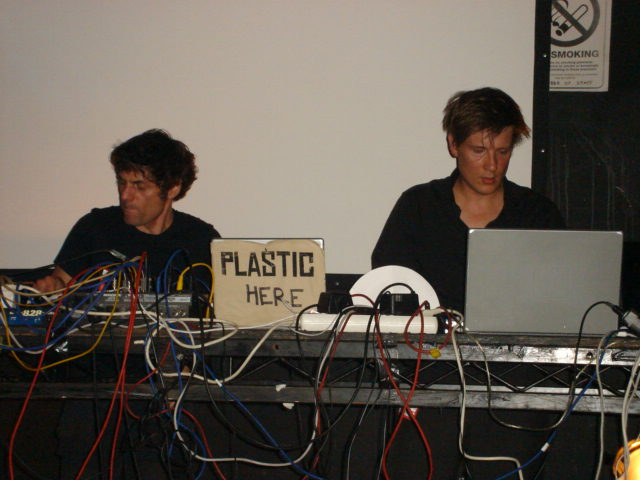
- Mouse on Mars performing live in 2007

Background information
- Origin: Düsseldorf, Germany
- Genres: Electronic; IDM; ambient; glitch; post-rock; experimental
- Years active: 1993–present
- Labels: Domino; Ipecac; Monkeytown; Sonig; Thrill Jockey; Too Pure
- Members: Jan St. Werner; Andi Toma
- Website: www.mouseonmars.de

Mouse on Mars is a German electronic music duo formed in 1993 by Jan St. Werner and Andi Toma. Their music is a blend of electronic genres including IDM, dub, krautrock, breakbeat, and ambient, featuring heavy use of organic analog synth and cross-frequency modulation. Their music also features live instrumentation including strings, horns, drums, bass, and guitar.

== History ==
St. Werner, from Cologne, and Toma, from Düsseldorf, are childhood friends who were born on the same day and in the same hospital. They both experimented with electronic music in the mid 1990s. On earlier recordings, their music was primarily krautrock, dub, techno and ambient, and did not feature vocals, but more recent recordings increasingly include vocals from featured guest artists, many of whom have toured with the duo.

Their first album, Vulvaland, was released in 1994 on the British record label Too Pure. Sean Cooper of AllMusic stated that it is "a wibbly, barely digital match of ambient texturology with experimental strains of techno, dub, and Krautrock."

Their second album, Iaora Tahiti, has a much more playful feel and encompasses a wider variety of electronic dance genres. Over the years, their sound has increased in warmth, playfulness and what the duo term "fantastic analysis". Their sixth album Niun Niggung (released on Domino in 2000), showed live instruments becoming more prominent. Idiology, their seventh album, continued this practice, and on their eighth album, Radical Connector, they took more of an accessible "pop" approach; both also increasingly included vocals, primarily from touring drummer Dodo NKishi.

Mouse on Mars regularly perform live as a three-piece, with Toma & St. Werner augmented by drummer Dodo NKishi. In 2005, they released their first live album, titled Live 04.

The band released their tenth full album, Parastrophics, almost six years later, in February 2012. It was their first album to be released under Modeselektor's Monkeytown record label. Following this another six years later, the band reunited with Thrill Jockey to release Dimensional People in April 2018.

St. Werner has released solo work under his own name, and as Lithops and Noisemashinetapes. St. Werner also partners with Markus Popp of Oval for Microstoria. St. Werner has also collaborated with the renowned visual artist Rosa Barba.

While releasing albums on British indie labels, Mouse on Mars started their own label, Sonig, on which they release their own work and that of other German artists. They have also produced a number of EPs and have recorded music for film soundtracks as well as remixing the work of other musicians.

In 2018 with the release of the Dimensional People release, the band perform under the name of Dimensional People Ensemble, an ensemble of drums, horns, strings, vocals, and electronic instruments, played by robotics and humanoids.

== Collaborations ==
Mouse on Mars collaborated in the studio and toured with Stereolab in the mid 1990s – the results can be heard on Stereolab's Dots and Loops album and the associated Miss Modular EP, and Mouse on Mars' Cache Cœur Naïf EP. St. Werner and Lætitia Sadier have also performed karaoke duets.

The duo collaborated with Mark E. Smith of The Fall, firstly on the Wipe That Sound EP in 2004, and then forming the band Von Südenfed in 2007. Their album is called Tromatic Reflexxions.

In November 2012, Mouse on Mars released WOW. It marked the duo's first recorded collaboration with the vocalist Dao Anh Khanh, producer Eric D. Clarke, and the punk band Las Kellies.

The band also collaborated with scholar Louis Chude-Sokei on the albums Anarchic Artificial Intelligence (AAI) in 2021, and he toured with the band internationally in support of the album, as well as Spatial, No Problem in 2026. Chude-Sokei contributed field recordings for Spatial, No Problem, and performed at the album's live premiere at The Barbican in London.

Spatial, No Problem was also reggae/dub icon Lee "Scratch" Perry's final album project before he died.

Chude-Sokei also collaborated with St. Werner, in a separate project, No Nation Left But the Imagination, at Maerzmusik in March 2026.

== Discography ==
=== Studio albums ===
- Vulvaland (Too Pure, 1994)
- Iaora Tahiti (Too Pure, 1995)
- Autoditacker (Too Pure, 1997)
- Instrumentals (Sonig, 1997)
- Glam (Sonig, 1998)
- Niun Niggung (Domino/Rough Trade/Sonig/Thrill Jockey, 1999)
- Idiology (Domino/Sonig/Thrill Jockey, 2001)
- Radical Connector (Sonig/Thrill Jockey, 2004)
- Varcharz (Ipecac/Sonig, 2006)
- Parastrophics (Monkeytown, 2012)
- Dimensional People (Thrill Jockey, 2018)
- AAI (Thrill Jockey, 2021)

=== Collaborative albums ===
- Tromatic Reflexxions (with Mark E. Smith, as Von Südenfed; Domino, 2007)
- Spatial, No Problem (with Lee "Scratch" Perry; Domino, 2026)

=== Compilation albums ===
- Rost Pocks: The EP Collection (Too Pure, 2003)
- 21 Again (Monkeytown, 2014)

=== Live albums ===
- Live 04 (Sonig, 2005)

=== EPs ===
- Cache Cœur Naïf (Rough Trade/Thrill Jockey/Too Pure, 1997)
- Pickly Dred Rhizzoms (Sonig/Thrill Jockey, 1999)
- WOW (Monkeytown, 2012)
- Synaptics (Monkeytown, 2017)

=== Singles ===
- "Frosch" (Too Pure, 1994)
- "Bib" (Too Pure, 1995)
- "Saturday Night Worldcup Fieber" (Too Pure, 1995)
- "Twift" (Our Choice, 1997)
- "Distroia" (Our Choice, 1999)
- "Diskdusk" (Our Choice, 1999)
- "Actionist Respoke" (Thrill Jockey, 2001)
- "Agit Itter It" (Thrill Jockey, 2002)
- "Wipe That Sound" (Sonig, 2005)
- "They Know Your Name" (Monkeytown, 2012)
- "Spezmodia" (Monkeytown, 2014)

=== Remixes ===
- The Pastels – Illuminati ("Attic Plan"; Domino, 1998)

=== Compilation appearances ===
- Trance Europe Express 3 ("Maus Mobil"; Volume, 1994)
- In Memoriam Gilles Deleuze ("1001"; Mille Plateaux, 1998)
- Silver Monk Time ("Momks No Time"; Play Loud, 2006)
