= Iaora Tahiti =

Studio album by Mouse on Mars
- Released: 3 October 1995
- Studio: Academy of St. Martin in the Streets
- Genre: IDM; electronica; downtempo
- Length: 68:21
- Label: Too Pure
- Producer: Jan St. Werner; Andi Toma

Mouse on Mars chronology
Vulvaland (1994)	Iaora Tahiti (1995)	Autoditacker (1997)

Singles from Iaora Tahiti
- 1. "Bib" Released: 1995

Iaora Tahiti is the second studio album by German electronica duo Mouse on Mars. It was released in 1995.

== Critical reception ==
Professional ratings
Review scores
Source	Rating
AllMusic	5/5 stars
The Encyclopedia of Popular Music	4/5 stars
Muzik	4/5 stars
NME	8/10
Pitchfork	8.3/10
The Village Voice	C+

In 2003, Pitchfork placed Iaora Tahiti at number 67 on its list of "Top 100 Albums of the 1990s". Critic Mark Richardson said, "This is sunny electronic music operating in accordance with the pleasure principle."

== Track listing ==
All tracks are written by Jan St. Werner and Andi Toma, except where noted.

No.	Title	Length
1.	"Stereomission"	4:32
2.	"Kompod"	4:05
3.	"Saturday Night Worldcup Fieber"	4:19
4.	"Schunkel"	5:00
5.	"Gocard"	3:54
6.	"Kanu"	5:57
7.	"Bib"	5:59
8.	"Schlecktron"	4:59
9.	"Preprise"	1:35
10.	"Papa, Antoine"	6:51
11.	"Omnibuzz"	4:33
12.	"Hallo"	3:59
13.	"Die Innere Orange" (St. Werner, Toma, Harald Ziegler)	12:38

Japanese edition bonus track
No.	Title	Length
14.	"Bib" (Lomo Mix)	8:00

== Personnel ==
Credits adapted from liner notes.

Mouse on Mars

- Jan St. Werner – composition, arrangement, production
- Andi Toma – composition, arrangement, production

Additional personnel

- Nobuko Sugai – vocals (1)
- Wolfgang Flür – drums (1)
- Dodo Nkishi – drums (1, 4, 6, 7)
- Bodo Staiger – pedal steel guitar (10)
- Harald Ziegler – lyrics (13), vocals (13)
