= Glam (album) =

Studio album by Mouse on Mars
- Released: 20 July 1998
- Recorded: 1996
- Studio: St. Martin Tonstudio
- Genres: IDM; electronica; ambient; experimental
- Length: 59:26
- Label: Sonig
- Producers: Jan St. Werner; Andi Toma

Mouse on Mars chronology
Instrumentals (1997)	Glam (1998)	Niun Niggung (1999)

Glam is the fifth studio album by German electronica duo Mouse on Mars, released in 1998. It was recorded for the purpose of being the score to the 1997 film of the same name. However, the soundtrack was rejected by the film's director Josh Evans.

== Release ==
In 1998, Glam was originally released by Sonig on vinyl, though a CD was released in Japan by Tokuma Japan Communications. The Japanese release also included the additional tracks "Snap Bar", "Pool, Smooth and Hidder" and "Hetzchase Nailway". The album was later reissued on CD in the US by Thrill Jockey in 2003, with the aforementioned extra tracks included.

== Critical reception ==
Professional ratings
Review scores
Source	Rating
AllMusic	4.5/5 stars
Muzik	4/5 stars
NME	7/10
Pitchfork	9.1/10
Rolling Stone	3/5 stars
Stylus Magazine	A

Ken Micallef of Rolling Stone praised Glam as "a beautiful and vital record." Kareem Estefan of Stylus Magazine said, "The pinnacle of an unimaginably creative band, Glam should be cherished as a masterpiece."

In 2017, Pitchfork placed Glam at number 31 on its list of "The 50 Best IDM Albums of All Time".

== Track listing ==
No.	Title	Length
1.	"Port Dusk"	7:35
2.	"Grindscore"	2:06
3.	"Snap Bar"	4:26
4.	"Tankpark"	4:52
5.	"Mood Leck Backlash"	3:30
6.	"Rerelease Hysteresis"	4:07
7.	"Pool, Smooth and Hidder"	2:53
8.	"Flim"	2:52
9.	"Tiplet Metal Plate"	3:00
10.	"Hi Court Low Cut"	3:14
11.	"Funky Tiste"	7:36
12.	"Starroom"	0:56
13.	"Litamin"	2:38
14.	"Hetzchase Nailway"	5:22
15.	"Glim"	4:11
