= Stephan Aarstol =

American internet entrepreneur

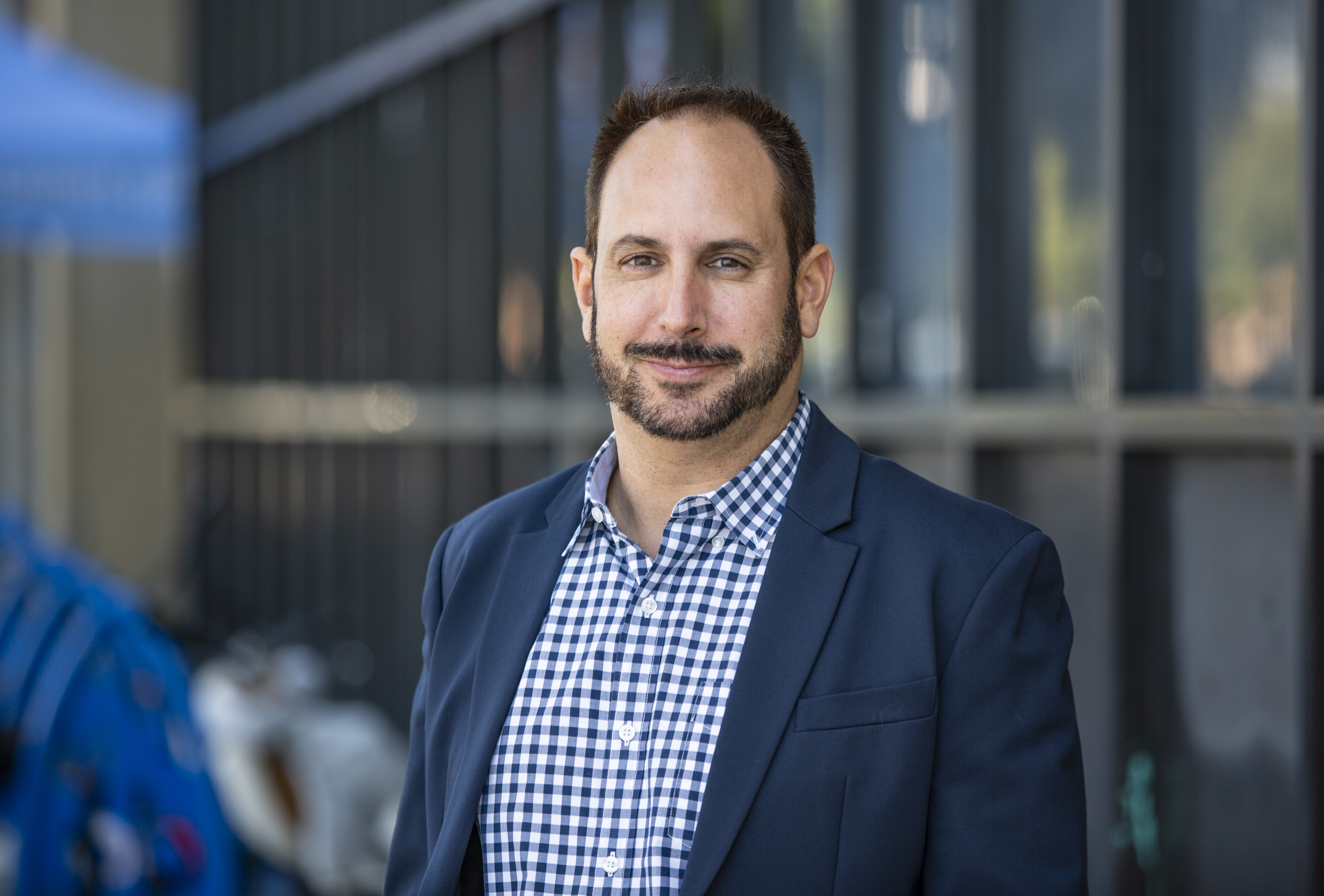
- Education: Western Washington University; University of San Diego
- Occupations: Entrepreneur, author
- Known for: The Five Hour Workday
- Website: www.towerpaddleboards.com fivehourworkday.com

Stephan Aarstol is an American internet entrepreneur and author of the book The Five Hour Workday.

== Life and early career ==
Aarstol grew up in Bellingham, Washington. He graduated from Western Washington University's College of Business and Economics in 1996 with a Bachelor of Arts in Finance, Marketing and Decision Sciences. In September 1999, Aarstol developed a web portal for the medical imaging community. In 2003, he launched a venture producing and selling high-end poker chips. Aarstol quit his day job the following year, by which time his venture was generating $50,000 per month.

== Tower Paddle Boards ==
Aarstol founded Tower Paddle Boards in 2010. Aarstol pitched his business on Shark Tank in 2011. Mark Cuban made an offer and invested $150,000 for a 30% stake in Aarstol's company. In 2013 and 2018, Aarstol was featured as one of Shark Tank's biggest winners by People Magazine. In addition to selling beach products, Aarstol is also the Editor-in-Chief of Tower Life Magazine, a biweekly publication that discusses beach lifestyle.

His company, was ranked San Diego's number one fastest growing private company in 2014. Jeff Bezos' 2015 annual letter to stockholders singles out Aarstol and his company. Aarstol was featured on ABC's Beyond the Tank in January 2016.

In November 2016, Harvard Business School professor Thales S. Teixeira published a case study on Aarstol and Tower Paddle Boards titled "Selling on Amazon at Tower Paddle Boards".

In 2018, Aarstol launched the No Middleman Project, an online directory promoting direct-to-consumer retail models. The project was described by Inc. as part of a broader movement to reduce reliance on third-party marketplaces.

== The Five Hour Workday ==
In June 2016, Aarstol published The Five Hour Workday, a book about switching his company to a five-hour workday and the benefits this change yielded in productivity.
