= Louis Chude-Sokei =

Nigerian writer and scholar

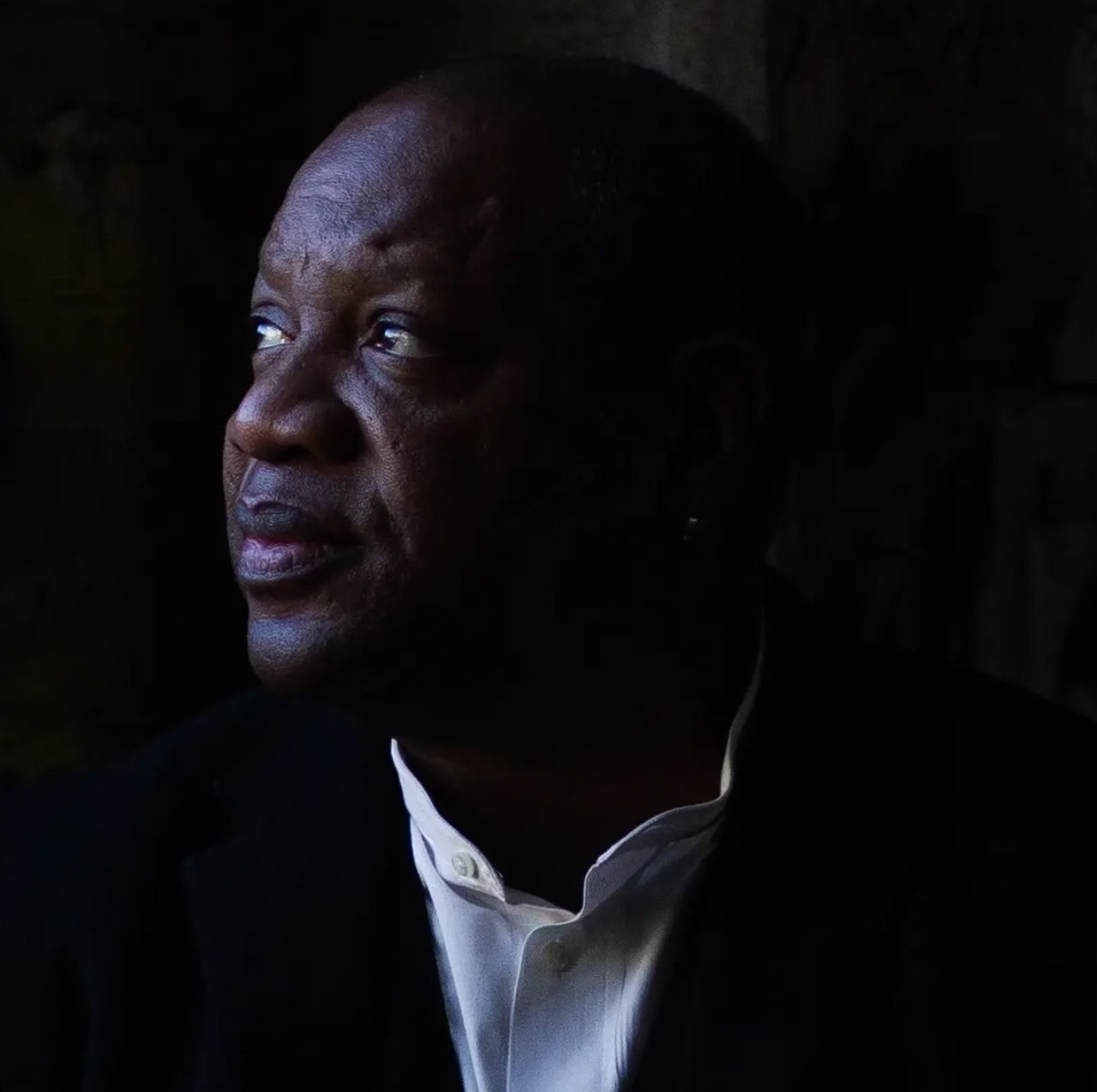
- Photograph of Louis Chude-Sokei taken by Cydney Scott
- Born: Nigeria
- Education: University of California, Los Angeles (B.A., English (Honors); Ph.D., English)
- Occupations: Writer and scholar
- Employer: Boston University

Louis Chude-Sokei is a writer and scholar who was born in Nigeria, raised in Jamaica, and educated in the United States, graduating from the university of California, Los Angeles, where he earned both a bachelor's degree and a Ph.D. in English. He is a Professor of English at Boston University and holds the George and Joyce Wein Chair in African American and Black Diaspora Studies, a program he directed from 2017 to 2025. His work centers around the literary, political, and cultural phenomena of the African diaspora. He was awarded a 2025 Guggenheim Fellowship for General Nonfiction. In 2026, he was awarded the Teshome H. Gabriel Award for Distinguished Research and Scholarship in Africana Studies, presented by the Association for Advanced Research in Africana Studies at the University of California, San Diego.

== Works ==
Chude-Sokei's books include The Last Darky: Bert Williams, Black on Black Minstrelsy, and the African Diaspora (Duke University Press, 2005), The Sound of Culture: Diaspora and Black Technopoetics (Wesleyan University Press, 2015), and the memoir Floating in a Most Peculiar Way (Houghton Mifflin Harcourt, 2021). His work has appeared in numerous languages, including the German publication, Race und Technologie: Essays der Migration (2023) and the Korean translation of Dr. Satan's Echo Chamber: Reggae, Technology and the Diaspora Process (2022).

He was Editor in Chief of The Black Scholar for over ten years, having stepped down in 2025. In his tenure as Editor in Chief he turned one of the oldest journals of Black Studies in America into the leading venue for contemporary Black thought and scholarship. His forthcoming book is Machines of Flesh and Blood: Race and the Making of Artificial Life (Viking/Random House).

Chude-Sokei published The Last Darky: Bert Williams, Black on Black Minstrelsy, and the African Diaspora in 2005, which focused on black performers who opted to wear blackface and on Black immigrants in early 20th century America who performed African American identity. It was a finalist for the Hurston/Wright Legacy Award for Non-fiction. He published The Sound of Culture in 2015, which is a history of the parallel evolution of ideas about race and ideas about technology through his analysis of science fiction and sound. In 2019 it was nominated for the American Musicological Society's Judy Tsou Critical Race Studies Award. Chude-Sokei's memoir Floating in a Most Peculiar Way (2021) was praised by The New York Times and described as, "Too African for Jamaica, too Jamaican for America, too American for Nigeria." It was named a New York Times Editor's Pick, and a Kirkus Books Nonfiction Book of the Year. In assessing Chude-Sokei's three books, The New York Review of Books stated: "Reading Chude-Sokei’s work helps us understand the fractious processes that shape the meaning of Blackness, and also offers a way to make sense of the shifting landscape of Black America due to African, Caribbean, and Latin American immigration."

Chude-Sokei's public and literary writing has been featured in various national and international platforms including The LA Times, The New York Times, The Seattle Times, and The San Francisco Chronicle, to The Believer, The Chicago Quarterly, South Africa's Chimurenga Chronic and The Daily Gleaner in Jamaica. He has also appeared in numerous documentaries including the 2016 Seattle Times documentary, Under Our Skin, the 2022 documentary Right to Offend: The Black Comedy Revolution produced by Kevin Hart, and Henry Louis Gates's Reconstruction: America After the Civil War which appeared on PBS in 2019. He was also featured on Fela Kuti: Fear No Man, a biographical podcast series produced by Jad Abumrad and Higher Ground Productions in 2025,as well as a commentator and narrator in "Sun Ra: Do the Impossible" for PBS' American Masters.

== Sonic Arts ==
Chude-Sokei is founder of Echolocution: Sonic Arts and Archiving, a project which asks the question, "What can we learn if we return to sites of trauma and violence through sound and techniques of listening?" As part of his work with Echolocution he was lead artist/curator of Sometimes You Just Have to Give it Your Attention, a sound art/sonic archiving project which won the Kulturstiftung Des Bundes Award from the German Federal Cultural Foundation in 2020. The album of sound recordings and installations from that project was released in 2024.

Chude-Sokei also collaborated with Marina Rosenfeld on her audio and performance art installation "µ (mu)" at the Curtis R. Priem Experimental Media and the Performing Arts Center in New York and the Gwangju Biennale in South Korea in 2024.

Chude-Sokei's collaborations also include the iconic Berlin electronic artists, Mouse On Mars, with whom he has produced sound installations and the album Anarchic Artificial Intelligence (AAI) and toured with the band internationally in support of the album (Thrill Jockey, 2021).

He also collaborated with them on Spatial, No Problem, released in 2026. The project was reggae/dub icon Lee "Scratch" Perry's final album project before he died. Chude-Sokei contributed field recordings for Spatial, No Problem, and performed at the album's live premiere at The Barbican in London.

He also curated an immersive installation based on the music of Spatial, No Problem at the National Sawdust in Brooklyn as a part of Carnegie Hall's Festival of Afrofuturism in 2022, prior to the release of the album. Chude-Sokei was also a curator of that festival.

Chude-Sokei and Jan St. Werner, co-founder of Mouse on Mars, also collaborated in a separate project, No Nation Left But the Imagination, at Maerzmusik in March 2026.

The Bill T. Jones/Arnie Zane Dance Company adapted sections of his book, The Sound of Culture, for their 2023-2024 touring show Curriculum II. He has also collaborated and performed with renowned figures such as musician and writer, David Grubbs, the Egyptian artist Yara Mekawei, the conceptual artist duo, Mendi &Keith Obadike, Andi Thoma, Tyler Friedman, and the well-known Kurdish vocalist and women's rights activist, Hani Mojtahedy.

He also contributed to Jay Glass Dubs' "Innocent Again", from his 2023 album You Would Love Me Now.

Chude-Sokei's vocals were featured on Indigenous Resistance's track, "Decolonizing Decolonization" from their album IR 80 Searching For The Dub Sublime in 2026.

Chude-Sokei is currently an advisor to the Guggenheim Museum's Art and Technology Initiative in partnership with LG Electronics. His work was central to the official German Pavilion at the 2024 Venice Biennale, where he also contributed a sound installation entitled "Thresholds," which lent its title to the Pavilion itself.

== Bibliography ==
=== Books ===
- Dr. Satan's Echo Chamber: Reggae, Technology and the Diaspora Process (1997) ISBN 9789766102197
- The Last Darky: Bert Williams, Black-on-Black Minstrelsy, and the African Diaspora (2006) ISBN 9780822336051
- The Sound of Culture: Diaspora and Black Technopoetics (2015) ISBN 9780819575784
- Floating in a Most Peculiar Way: A Memoir (2021) ISBN 9781328781079
- Technologie und Race: Essays der Migration (2023) ISBN 9783751890113
