= Black family =

Black family may refer to:

- The Black Family, a professional wrestling group in Lucha Libre AAA Worldwide
- The Black Family (band), a Celtic music ensemble
- The Black family (1772–1797) of Blacksburg, Virginia
- The family of Sirius Black, character in the Harry Potter series of novels
- Black Guerrilla Family, also known as Black Family, African-American prison and street gang
- Black Family Channel, American cable television network which featured programming aimed at African-Americans

== See also ==
- Black (surname)
- Black (disambiguation)
- African-American family structure
