= Niun Niggung =

Studio album by Mouse on Mars
- Released: 1999
- Genres: IDM; glitch; drill 'n' bass
- Length: 62:04
- Labels: Rough Trade, Thrill Jockey, Domino, Sonig
- Producers: Jan St. Werner, Andi Toma

Mouse on Mars chronology
Glam (1998)	Niun Niggung (1999)	Idiology (2001)

Alternative cover
- Thrill Jockey edition

Niun Niggung is a studio album by German electronica duo Mouse on Mars. It was released in 1999. It peaked at number 76 on the German Albums Chart.

== Critical reception ==
Professional ratings
Review scores
Source	Rating
AllMusic	4/5 stars
Pitchfork	7.9/10
PopMatters	favorable

Andrew Duke of Exclaim! gave the album a favorable review, describing it as "an album that immediately becomes a must-have for the electronic music enthusiast."

The Wire named Niun Niggung the record of the year in its annual critics' poll. Spin placed it at number 16 on the "20 Best Albums of 2000" list. NME named it the 33rd best album of 1999.

== Track listing ==
Rough Trade Records edition
No.	Title	Length
1.	"Download Sofist"	2:28
2.	"Yippie"	3:51
3.	"Pinwheel Herman"	4:46
4.	"Super Sonig Fadeout"	4:37
5.	"Booosc"	3:15
6.	"Diskdusk"	3:50
7.	"Gogonal"	5:09
8.	"Albion Rose"	3:32
9.	"Mompou"	1:55
10.	"Distroia"	5:16
11.	"Wald F.X."	4:46
12.	"Circloid Bricklett Sprüngli"	2:18
13.	Untitled	14:37

Thrill Jockey edition
No.	Title	Length
1.	"Download Sofist"	2:28
2.	"Yippie"	3:51
3.	"Mykologics"	3:38
4.	"Gogonal"	5:09
5.	"Diskdusk"	3:50
6.	"Pinwheel Herman"	4:46
7.	"Dispothek"	5:22
8.	"Albion Rose"	3:32
9.	"Tensual"	3:35
10.	"Distroia"	5:16
11.	"Booosc"	3:15
12.	"Mompou"	1:55
13.	"Wald F.X."	4:46

Sonig edition
No.	Title	Length
1.	"Download Sofist"	2:28
2.	"Yippie"	5:28
3.	"Pinwheel Herman"	4:46
4.	"Super Sonig Fadeout"	4:37
5.	"Booosc"	3:15
6.	"Diskdusk"	3:50
7.	"Gogonal"	5:09
8.	"Albion Rose"	3:32
9.	"Mompou"	1:55
10.	"Distroia"	5:16
11.	"Wald F.X."	4:46
12.	"Circloid Bricklett Sprüngli"	2:18
13.	"Mykologic"	5:22
14.	"Dispothek"	3:42
15.	"Hidden Last"	17:15

== Personnel ==
Credits adapted from liner notes.

- Jan St. Werner – composition, arrangement, production
- Andi Toma – composition, arrangement, production
- F.X.Randomiz – digital soundprocessing, sample support
- Dodo Nkishi – drums
- Harald "Sack" Ziegler – French horn, brass arrangement
- Perry White – bass clarinet, flute
- Scott White – cello, violin
- Matty Arouse – fiddle
- Markus Dirk – bass trumpet

== Charts ==
Chart	Peak position
German Albums (Offizielle Top 100)	76
