= The Black Scholar =

The Black Scholar: Journal of Black Studies and Research
- Discipline: African-American studies
- Language: English
- Edited by: Louis Chude-Sokei

Publication details
- History: 1969–present
- Publisher: Routledge (UK)
- Frequency: Quarterly

Standard abbreviations
- ISO 4: Black Sch.

Indexing
- ISSN: 0006-4246 (print); 2162-5387 (web)
- JSTOR: 00064246

Links
- Journal homepage; Journal page at Routledge

The Black Scholar (TBS) is a journal founded in California, in 1969, by Robert Chrisman, Nathan Hare, and Allan Ross. It is the fourth oldest Black studies journal in the US, after the NAACP’s The Crisis (founded in 1910), the Journal of African American History (formerly The Journal of Negro History, founded in 1916), and African American Review (formerly Black American Literature Forum and Negro American Literature Forum, founded in 1967). The journal is currently housed at Boston University's Program in African American Studies. Originally published 10 times a year, and without peer review, the journal introduced peer review and became a quarterly in 2015.

== Production ==
From 1969 to 2009, it was independently published, printed and distributed by the Black World Foundation. From 2009 to 2014, it was published, printed and distributed by Paradigm Press. The Black Scholar's editor-in-chief is the scholar and writer Louis Chude-Sokei. TBS is owned by the Robert Chrisman Foundation, a Seattle based non-profit educational organization, which took over ownership from The Black World Foundation when the latter was dissolved in 2018. It is currently published by Routledge/Taylor & Francis.

== Journal origins ==
Robert Chrisman (1937–2013) and Nathan Hare (b. 1933) were active in the 1968-9 Black studies struggle at San Francisco State University. The experience motivated Chrisman and Hare to create a venue outside of the academy for Black knowledge production. In November 1969, Hare (publisher), Chrisman (editor) and Allan Ross, a white Bay Area printer (as business manager) founded The Black Scholar: A Journal of Black Studies and Research to cover issues of social, cultural, economic and political thought.

Robert L. Allen (b. 1942) joined the journal as associate editor in 1974, then rose to senior editor following Nathan Hare's departure and Robert Chrisman's move to the position of publisher/Editor-in-Chief. Allen remained senior editor until his retirement in 2012. Allan Ross (d. 1974) had left in 1973; his assistant Gloria Bevien took his place as business manager. Hare left The Black Scholar in spring 1975. The public split attracted coverage from national newspapers. In 2012, Robert Chrisman officially retired from his position as editor-in-chief and Publisher of The Black Scholar.

According to Black Studies academic Abdul Alkalimat, "Publishing material that directly reflected different sides of the prominent debates in the Black community was the contribution of The Black Scholar that endeared it to the main activists of Black Studies as Social Movement".

== Notable articles and special issues ==
The journal was an early critic of Black incarceration, publishing two special issues on "The Black Prisoner" (April/May 1971; Oct 1972). Robert Chrisman's essay "Black Prisoners, White Law", from the 1971 issue, was taken up by mainstream media such as the New York Times.

In 1971, a special issue on "The Black Woman" (Dec 1971) featured Angela Davis' "Reflections on the Black Woman's Role in the Community of Slaves". The essay, written and published while Davis was in prison, has been widely cited and anthologized.

The early 1970s also published influential special issues concerning Pan-Africanism ("Pan Africanism I", Feb 1971; "Pan Africanism II", Mar 1971; "The Pan-African Debate", July/Aug 1973) These and related essays were published in 1974 by Bobbs-Merrill, as a book titled Pan-Africanism.

In 1979, the journal published "The Black Sexism Debate" (May/June 1979); this was one of the first public scholarly forums about sexism within the African-American community.

In 1980, the journal published a pair of special issues on "Black Anthropology" (Sept/Oct 1980 and Nov/Dec 1980), guest-edited by Johnnetta Cole and Sheila S. Walker on behalf of the Association of Black Anthropologists, whose editorial (Sept/Oct 1980) explained that this was "the first collection of works by Afro-American anthropologists".

In 1992, following Clarence Thomas’ controversial hearings in the Senate prior to his being confirmed to the Supreme Court, TBS compiled a special issue (Winter 1991/Spring 1992). The essays were later published as Court of Appeal: The Black Community Speaks Out on the Racial and Sexual Politics of Thomas vs. Hill (Ballantine, 1992).

In Spring 1999, the double issue "Black Women Writers" was the first Anglophone publication of the first major international conference devoted to literature from around the world by women of African descent. The conference, "Yari Yari", was organized by Organization of Women Writers of Africa and took place in New York, 1997.

Since 2015, the journal has published issues in Black Studies in response to new Black academics, political activism, and cultural conversations. An issue on Dominican Black Studies was awarded by the Latin American Studies Association.

== Black Scholar Press ==
As part of the educational mission of the journal and The Black World Foundation, The Black Scholar Press was launched in 1978. It concentrated on publishing social science and poetry titles. Social science titles include

- The widely cited book by Charles P. Henry, Jesse Jackson: the Search for Common Ground. Black Scholar Press, 1991

Notable poetry titles include:

- The widely cited book by Sonia Sanchez, I've Been A Woman: New and Selected Poems. Black Scholar Press, 1978
- The prize-winning book by Andrew Salkey, about Chile, In the Hills Where Her Dreams Live. Black Scholar Press, 1979
- The first book of Cuban Nancy Morejon poetry translated into English, trans. Kathleen Weaver, Where the Island Sleeps Like a Wing: Selected Poetry. Black Scholar Press, 1985. This is widely cited in academic studies of poetry and poetics

== Anthologies ==
The editors of The Black Scholar have published anthologies of notable articles from the journal, including:

- Robert Chrisman and Nathan Hare (eds), Contemporary Black Thought: The Best of The Black Scholar, Bobbs-Merrill, 1973
- Robert Chrisman and Nathan Hare (eds), Pan-Africanism, Bobbs-Merrill, 1974
- Court of Appeal: The Black Community Speaks Out on the Racial and Sexual Politics of Thomas vs. Hill (edited by The Black Scholar), Ballantine Books, 1992
- Charles P. Henry, Robert L. Allen and Robert Chrisman (eds), The Obama Phenomenon: Toward a Multiracial Democracy, University of Illinois Press, 2011

== Archive ==
The Black Scholar Records were endowed to the UC Berkeley's Bancroft Library.

== Abstracting and indexing ==
The Black Scholar is abstracted and indexed in the following bibliographic databases:

- Emerging Sources Citation Index (Clarivate)
- Scopus (ELSEVIER)
- Academic Search Ultimate (EBSCO)
- Social Science Premium Collection (ProQuest)
- Social Sciences Abstracts (EBSCO)
- Agricultural & Environmental Science Collection (ProQuest)
- American History and Life (EBSCO)
- Education Abstracts (EBSCO)
- Education Collection (ProQuest)
- Education Source Ultimate (EBSCO)
- Gender Studies Database (EBSCO)
- Psychology & Behavioral Sciences Collection (EBSCO)
- Public Affairs Index (EBSCO)
- RILM Abstracts of Music Literature (Répertoire International de Littérature Musicale)
- Sociology Source Ultimate (EBSCO)
- Historical Abstracts (EBSCO)
- Modern Language Association Database (Modern Language Association of America)
- Political Science Complete (EBSCO)

According to the Journal Metrics Black Scholar webpage at Routledge, The Black Scholar has a 2022 Impact Factor of 0.4, a 2022 CiteScore (Scopus) of 0.7, and a 5 Year Impact Factor of 0.8. Retrieved June 1, 2024.
