= Las Kellies =

Argentine post-punk group

Las Kellies is an Argentine post-punk group formed in 2005 by Cecilia Kelly (vocals/guitar) and Silvina Costa (vocals/drums).

The group has been signed to Fire Records since 2010 and have released five albums: Shaking Dog (2007), Kalimera (2009), Kellies (2011), Total Exposure (2013) and Friends & Lovers (2016).

== Biography ==
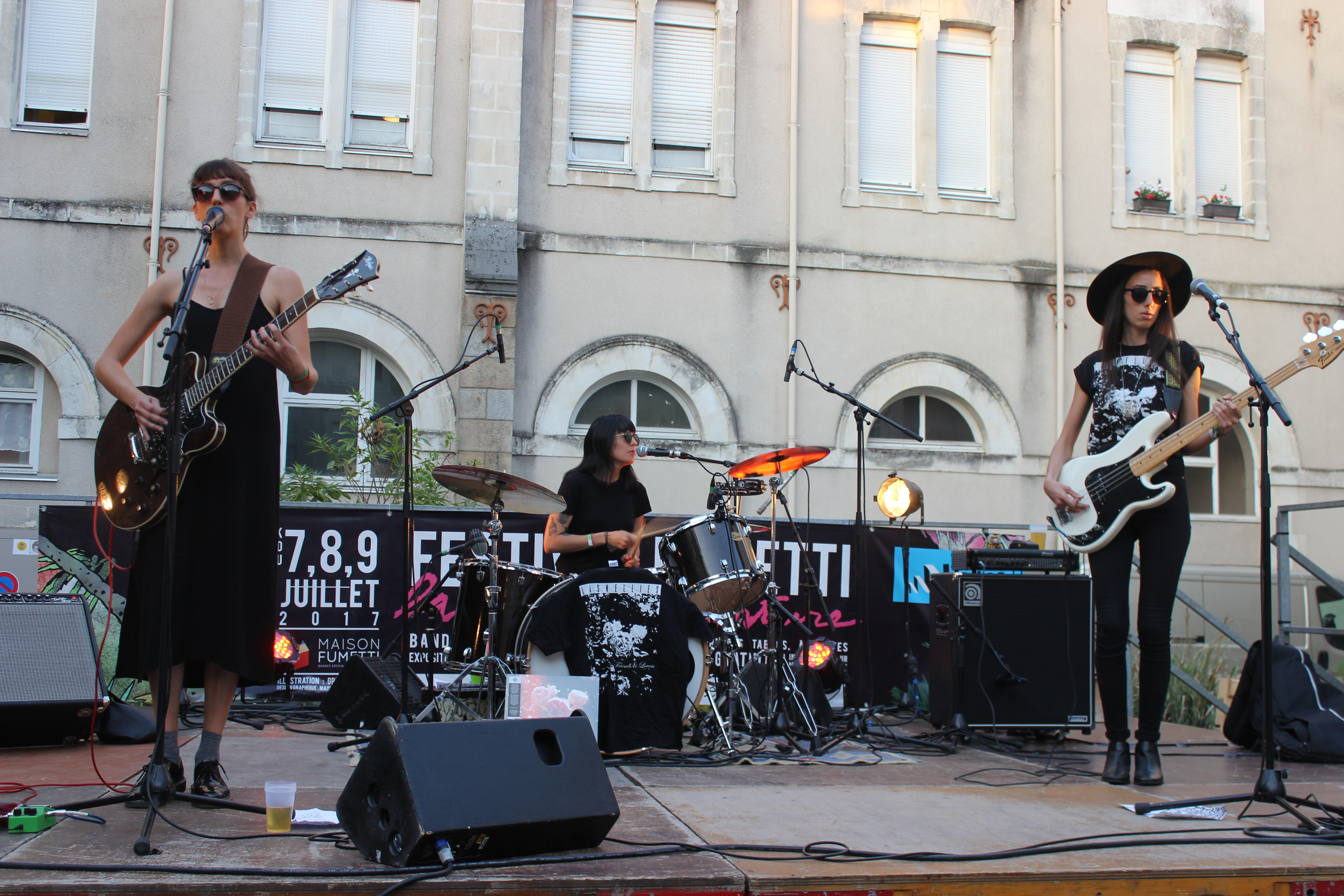
Las Kellies in 2017 during the closing night of the Fumetti festival in Nantes

The band was formed when Kelly and Costa met at a concert in 2005 and decided to form a female rock band. They opted to use the surname of their lead singer and guitarist Cecilia Kelly as a name for the band. Since then all members use the same surname as a pseudonym. Their original bass player Titi Kelly left the band before the release of their first album in 2007 and was replaced by JJ Kelly, who left in 2009 and was replaced by Betty Kelly (Julia Worley). Ceci Kelly was the main songwriter, while the band occasionally played Devo covers. The band made their live debut in Buenos Aires.

After playing together for over two years, Las Kellies released his first album, Shaking Dog in January 2007 on their own independent label. The songs of this album are mainly composed by Ceci Kelly.

Their second album, Kalimera, was released in June 2009. On this occasion Ceci co-wrote the eleven songs with Sil Costa and Julia Worley. The trio toured Europe for the first time, performing at several festivals, such as Down By The River, Open Air, Secret Garden Party, Teenitus Fest, Festival Jarana or Fusion Festival.

Their third album entitled Kellies was released in January 2010. It contained 14 songs and was recorded in Argentina. The album was mixed by Dennis Bovell and released through Fire Records in the UK, produced by Iván Diaz Mathé, aka Ivy Lee of South American dub reggae band, Nairobi. In 2011, bass player Betty Kelly left the group and was replaced by Adry Kelly on bass. In 2012 they joined with the German duo Mouse on Mars and featured on the mini album WOW.

In 2012 Fire Records released a split single vinyl with Bronx post punk legends ESG with Las Kellies covering "Erase You" on the B-side. Las Kellies cited ESG as an influence, and covered their songs live and on recordings.

Before recording their next album, 2013's Total Exposure, Betty Kelly left the band, but contributed songs and recorded on "La Fiesta". For 2016's Friends & Lovers, the band worked with Mathé to oversee the sessions, which favored a more stripped-down punk sound. Bassist Manuela Ducatenzeiler helped out with post-release touring. Continuing to operate as a duo, Ceci and Sil gathered prior influences on their sixth album, Suck This Tangerine. Released on Fire Records in 2020, it featured Betty Kelly on the track "Close Talker."

Adry left the band in 2013 and was replaced with Sofi Kelly. This trio record the album Total Exposure together with Bovell. In 2016 they released their fifth album Friends & Lovers, produced by Iván Diaz Mathé. It was preceded by the single "Summer Breeze" and "Make it Real". The trio embarked on a European tour throughout November–December 2016.

== Members ==
=== Current ===
- Ceci Kelly (vocals and guitars)
- Sil Kelly (drums and vocals)

== See also ==
- Latino punk
- Rock en espagnol
- La Onda
