= Autoditacker =

Studio album by Mouse on Mars
- Released: 18 August 1997
- Recorded: 1996–1997
- Genres: IDM, glitch, ambient dub
- Length: 63:40
- Label: Too Pure
- Producers: Jan St. Werner; Andi Toma

Mouse on Mars chronology
Iaora Tahiti (1995)	Autoditacker (1997)	Instrumentals (1997)

Autoditacker is the third studio album by German electronica duo Mouse on Mars. It was released in 1997.

== Critical reception ==
Professional ratings
Review scores
Source	Rating
AllMusic	5/5 stars
Chicago Tribune	3/4 stars
The Encyclopedia of Popular Music	4/5 stars
Entertainment Weekly	A−
Muzik	7/10
NME	8/10
Pitchfork	7.8/10
Rolling Stone	3/5 stars
Spin	8/10

Marc Weingarten of Entertainment Weekly described Autoditacker as "a messy mosaic of trills, chirps, and buzzing sounds that slam headfirst into dense, abstract, and occasionally danceable grooves." Stephen Thomas Erlewine of AllMusic said, "Each listen reveals new layers of the group's intricate arrangements, and the shifting instrumentation and themes recall the best adventurous jazz in terms of unpredictability."

In 2017, Pitchfork placed Autoditacker at number 18 on its list of "The 50 Best IDM Albums of All Time". Staff writer Mark Pytlik wrote: "Don’t let the synth squiggles and oddball sound effects fool you into thinking of this as a novelty album. From the effervescent opener of the breakneck 'Sui Shop,' to the krautrock-influenced motorik of 'Tamagnocchi,' to the proto-microhouse of 'Schnick Schnack Meltmade,' Autoditacker is expertly constructed music made by skilled musicians with a serious goal. It just so happens that goal is to not take everything so seriously."

== Track listing ==
All tracks are written by Jan St. Werner and Andi Toma, except where noted.

No.	Title	Length
1.	"Sui Shop"	5:12
2.	"Juju"	4:57
3.	"Twift Shoeblade"	4:24
4.	"Tamagnocchi"	5:33
5.	"Dark FX"	3:21
6.	"Scat"	4:55
7.	"Tux & Damask"	5:02
8.	"Sehnsud"	6:32
9.	"X-Flies"	6:10
10.	"Schnick Schnack Meltmade" (Lætitia Sadier, St. Werner, Toma)	6:02
11.	"Rondio"	4:58
12.	"Maggots Hell Wigs"	6:49

Japanese edition bonus tracks
No.	Title	Length
13.	"Cache Coeur Naif"	3:21
14.	"Glim"	4:10

== Personnel ==
Credits adapted from liner notes.

Mouse on Mars

- Jan St. Werner – composition, production
- Andi Toma – composition, production

Additional personnel

- F.X.Randomiz – digital sound processing (2)
- John Frenett – bass guitar (4)
- Lætitia Sadier – lyrics (10)
