= Mark Ruffalo on screen and stage =

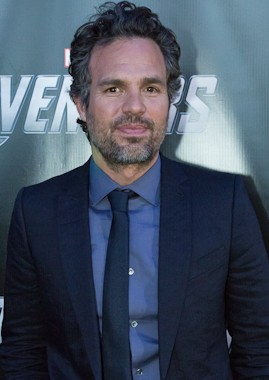
Ruffalo at the Toronto premiere of The Avengers in 2012

Mark Ruffalo is an American actor who has starred in numerous productions on screen and stage. Ruffalo made his acting debut in an episode of CBS Summer Playhouse. He began collaborating with Kenneth Lonergan and appeared in several of his plays, In 1996, he was included in the original cast of Lonergan's play This Is Our Youth (1996) which gained him recognition subsequently he had minor roles in films including The Dentist (1996), Safe Men (1998) and Ang Lee's Civil War Western Ride with the Devil (1999). In 2000, he starred as Laura Linney's character's brother in Lonergan's Academy Award-nominated film You Can Count on Me.

In the mid-2000s, he was featured in the films View from the Top (2002), 13 Going on 30 (2004), Just Like Heaven (2005) and Rumor Has It (2005). In 2006, Ruffalo starred in Awake and Sing! for which he was nominated for a Tony Award for Best Featured Actor in a Play. In 2007, he appeared in David Fincher's mystery thriller Zodiac which was based on a true story. He played the role of SFPD inspector Dave Toschi, who ran the investigation to find and apprehend the Zodiac killer.

In 2012, he replaced Edward Norton in the role of Dr. Bruce Banner / The Hulk in the Marvel Studios film The Avengers (2012). He later reprised the role in Iron Man 3 (2013), Avengers: Age of Ultron (2015), Thor: Ragnarok (2017), Avengers: Infinity War (2018), Captain Marvel (2019), Avengers: Endgame (2019), Shang-Chi and the Legend of the Ten Rings (2021), and Spider-Man: Brand New Day (2026) as well as the Disney+ series What If...? (2021–2024) and She-Hulk: Attorney at Law (2022). He also starred in the Now You See Me film series and in the 2014 biographical drama film Foxcatcher as Dave Schultz which earned him best Supporting Actor nominations for an Academy Award, BAFTA Award, Golden Globe and Screen Actors Guild Award. The next year in 2015, he appeared as journalist Michael Rezendes in the drama film Spotlight, for which he earned his third Academy Award nomination and a BAFTA Award nomination.

== Film ==
Year	Title	Role	Notes	Ref.
1992	Rough Trade	Hank	Short film	
1994	A Gift From Heaven	Danny		
1994	Mirror, Mirror II: Raven Dance	Christian		
1994	There Goes My Baby	J.D.		
1995	Mirror, Mirror III: The Voyeur	Joey		
1996	The Destiny of Marty Fine	Brett	Also screenwriter	
1996	The Dentist	Steve Landers		
1996	Blood Money	Attorney		
1996	The Last Big Thing	Brent Benedict		
1998	Safe Men	Frank		
1998	54	Ricko		
1999	How Does Anyone Get Old?	Johnnie	Short film	
1999	A Fish in the Bathtub	Joel		
1999	Ride with the Devil	Alf Bowden		
2000	You Can Count on Me	Terry Prescott		
2000	Committed	T-Bo		
2001	The Last Castle	Yates		
2001	Apartment 12	Alex		
2002	XX/XY	Coles		
2002	Windtalkers	Private Pappas		
2003	My Life Without Me	Lee		
2003	View from the Top	Ted Stewart		
2003	In the Cut	Detective Giovanni A. Malloy		
2004	We Don't Live Here Anymore	Jack Linden	Also executive producer	
2004	Eternal Sunshine of the Spotless Mind	Stan		
2004	13 Going on 30	Matt Flamhaff		
2004	Collateral	Ray Fanning		
2005	Just like Heaven	David Abbott		
2005	Rumor Has It...	Jeff Daly		
2006	All the King's Men	Adam Stanton		
2007	Chicago 10	Jerry Rubin (voice)		
2007	Zodiac	Inspector Dave Toschi		
2007	Reservation Road	Dwight Arno		
2008	Blindness	Doctor		
2008	What Doesn't Kill You	Brian Reilly		
2009	The Brothers Bloom	Stephen		
2009	Where the Wild Things Are	Adrian		
2009	Sympathy for Delicious	Joe	Also director and producer	
2010	The Kids Are All Right	Paul Hatfield		
2010	Shutter Island	Chuck Aule / Dr. Lester Sheehan		
2010	Date Night	Brad Sullivan		
2011	Margaret	Gerald Maretti		
2012	The Avengers	Bruce Banner / The Hulk		
2013	Iron Man 3	Bruce Banner / The Hulk	Cameo appearance; post-credits scene	
2013	Thanks for Sharing	Adam		
2013	Now You See Me	Agent Dylan Rhodes		
2013	Begin Again	Dan Mulligan		
2014	Infinitely Polar Bear	Cam Stuart	Also executive producer	
2014	Foxcatcher	Dave Schultz		
2015	Avengers: Age of Ultron	Bruce Banner / The Hulk		
2015	Spotlight	Michael Rezendes		
2016	Now You See Me 2	Agent Dylan Rhodes		
2016	Team Thor	Bruce Banner	Short film	
2017	Anything	—N/a	Executive producer	
2017	Thor: Ragnarok	Bruce Banner / The Hulk / Smart Hulk		
2018	Avengers: Infinity War	Bruce Banner / The Hulk / Smart Hulk		
2019	Captain Marvel	Bruce Banner / The Hulk / Smart Hulk	Cameo appearance; mid-credits scene	
2019	Avengers: Endgame	Bruce Banner / The Hulk / Smart Hulk	Also in 2026 extended version	
2019	Dark Waters	Robert Bilott	Also producer	
2021	Shang-Chi and the Legend of the Ten Rings	Bruce Banner / The Hulk	Cameo appearance; mid-credits scene	
2022	The Adam Project	Louis Reed		
2023	Poor Things	Duncan Wedderburn		
2025	Mickey 17	Kenneth Marshall		
2025	Arco	Tom / Mikki (voice)	English dub	
2025	Cracking the Code: Phil Sharp and the Biotech Revolution	Narrator (voice)	Documentary film	
2025	Now You See Me: Now You Don't	Agent Dylan Rhodes	Cameo appearance	
2026	Crime 101	Detective Lou Lubesnick		
2026	Spider-Man: Brand New Day	Bruce Banner / The Hulk / Smart Hulk		
2026	Being Heumann	Joseph A. Califano Jr.		
2026	Avengers: Doomsday †	Bruce Banner / The Hulk	Post-production	
2026	Good Sex †	TBA	Post-production	
2027	Gatto †	Nero (voice)	Post-production	
TBA	Santo Subito! †	Father Joseph Murolo	Post-production	

Key
†	Denotes films that have not yet been released

== Television ==
Year	Title	Role	Notes
1989	CBS Summer Playhouse	Michael Dunne	Episode: "American Nuclear"
1994	Due South	Vinnie Webber	Episode: "A Cop, a Mountie, and a Baby"
1997	On the 2nd Day of Christmas	Bert	Television film
1998	Houdini	Theo	Television film
2000	The Beat	Zane Marinelli	8 episodes
2011	Sesame Street	Himself	Episode: "Big Bad Wolf Huffs and Puffs Slimey"
2014	The Normal Heart	Alexander "Ned" Weeks	Television film; also executive producer
2020	I Know This Much Is True	Dominick Birdsey / Thomas Birdsey	6 episodes; also executive producer
2021–2024	What If...?	Bruce Banner / The Hulk (voice)	5 episodes
2022	Little Demon	Bark Woofalo (voice)	Episode: "The Antichrist's Monster"
2022	She-Hulk: Attorney at Law	Bruce Banner / Smart Hulk	3 episodes
2022	Marvel Studios: Assembled	Himself	Episode: "The Making of She-Hulk: Attorney at Law"
2023	All the Light We Cannot See	Daniel LeBlanc	4 episodes
2025	Hal & Harper	Dad	9 episodes
2025–present	Task	Tom Brandis	7 episodes; also executive producer

Key
†	Denotes television productions that have not yet been released

== Theater ==
Year	Title	Role	Notes
1996	This Is Our Youth	Warren Straub	INTAR Theatre; Off-Broadway
1998–1999	This Is Our Youth	Warren Straub	McGinn-Cazale Theatre; Off-Broadway
1999	The Moment When	Steven	Playwrights Horizons; Off-Broadway
2006	Awake and Sing!	Moe Axelrod	Belasco Theatre; Broadway
2010	Awake and Sing!	Moe Axelrod	Skirball Cultural Center
2017	The Price	Victor Franz	American Airlines Theater; Broadway
2017	Our Town	Dr. Frank Gibbs	Fox Theatre
2018	The Destiny of Me	Ned Weeks	Lucille Lortel Theatre; Off-Broadway

== Audiobook ==
- 2016: Our Revolution: A Future to Believe In (together with Bernie Sanders, the author), Macmillan Audio, ISBN 978-1-4272-8533-1
