= List of awards and nominations received by Mark Ruffalo =

Mark Ruffalo awards and nominations
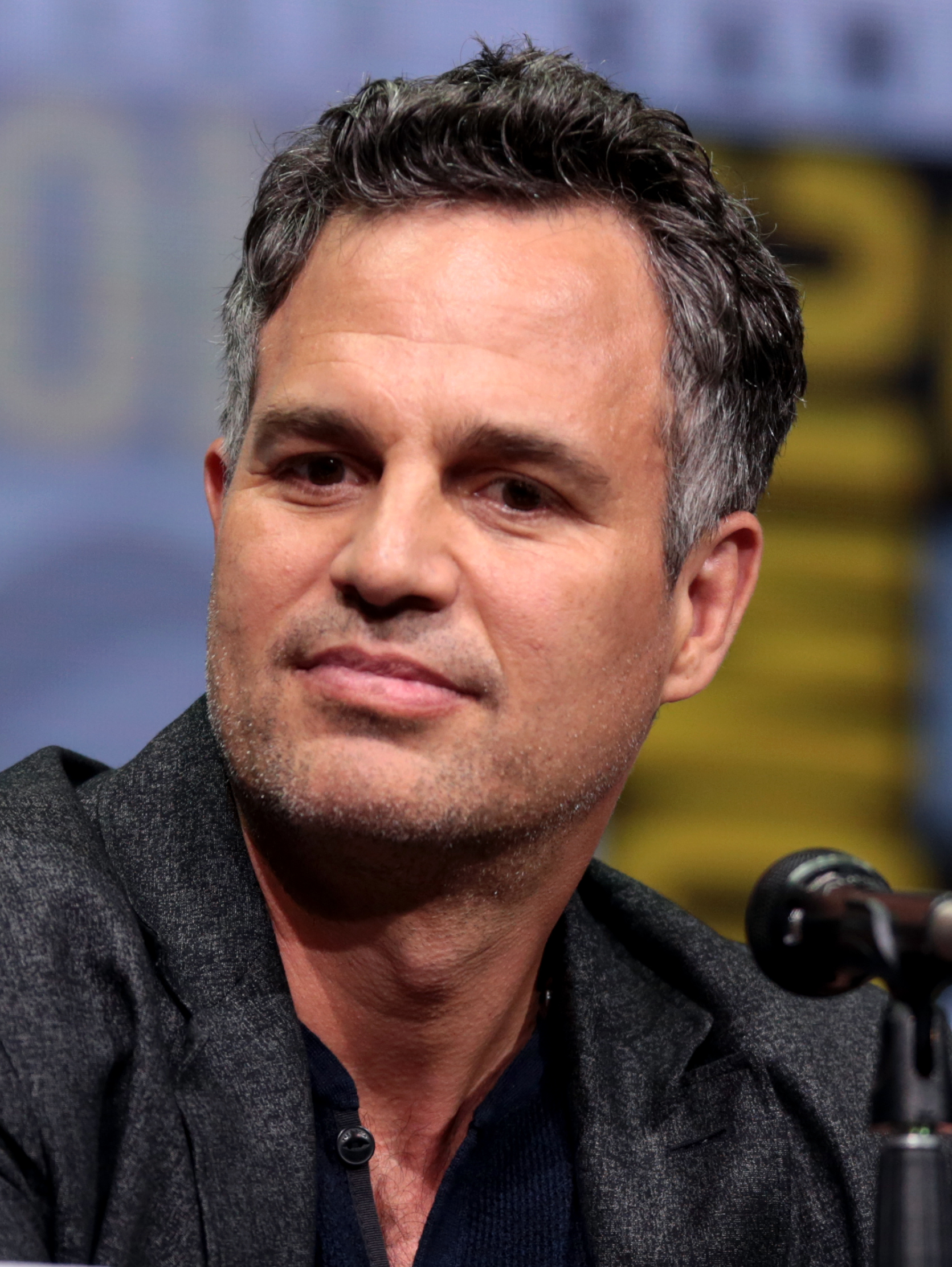
- Ruffalo at the 2017 San Diego Comic Con
Awards and nominations
Award	Wins	Nominations
Academy Award	0	4
BAFTA Awards	0	3
Emmy Award	2	4
Golden Globes	1	7
Grammy Awards	0	1
SAG Awards	3	6
Tony Award	0	1

Totals (Note: Certain award groups do not simply award one winner. They acknowledge several different recipients, have runners-up, and have third place. Since this is a specific recognition and is different from losing an award, runner-up mentions are considered wins in this award tally. For simplification and to avoid errors, each award in this list has been presumed to have had a prior nomination.)
- Wins: 26
- Nominations: 140

Mark Ruffalo is American actor known for his roles on stage and screen. He has received several awards throughout his career including two Primetime Emmy Awards, a Golden Globe Award and three Screen Actors Guild Awards as well as nominations for four Academy Awards, three British Academy Film Awards, six Critics' Choice Awards, a Grammy Award, and a Tony Award.

For his work on film, he has been nominated for four Academy Awards for Best Supporting Actor for his performances as a free spirited sperm donor in the comedy-drama The Kids Are All Right (2010), the wrestler Dave Schultz in the psychological thriller Foxcatcher (2014), the investigative journalist Michael Rezendes in the drama Spotlight (2015), and a debauched lawyer in the absurdist black comedy Poor Things (2023).

On television, he won the Primetime Emmy Award for Outstanding Lead Actor in a Limited Series or Movie for his dual performances as twin brothers Dominick and Thomas Birdsey in the HBO drama miniseries I Know This Much Is True (2020). The role also earned him the Golden Globe Award for Best Actor – Miniseries or Television Film, and the Screen Actors Guild Award for Outstanding Actor in a Miniseries or Movie. He was Emmy-nominated for his portrayal of Ned Weeks, an alter ego for Larry Kramer in the HBO television film The Normal Heart (2014).

On stage, Ruffalo was nominated for the Tony Award for Best Featured Actor in a Play for playing Moe Axelrod in the Broadway revival of the Clifford Odets play Awake and Sing! (2006). He was nominated for the Grammy Award for Best Audio Book, Narration & Storytelling Recording for narrating the Bernie Sanders political book Our Revolution: A Future to Believe (2018).

== Major associations ==
=== Academy Awards ===
Year	Category	Nominated work	Result	Ref.
2011	Best Supporting Actor	The Kids Are All Right	Nominated	
2015	Best Supporting Actor	Foxcatcher	Nominated	
2016	Best Supporting Actor	Spotlight	Nominated	
2024	Best Supporting Actor	Poor Things	Nominated	

=== BAFTA Awards ===
Year	Category	Nominated work	Result	Ref.
British Academy Film Awards
2011	Best Actor in a Supporting Role	The Kids Are All Right	Nominated	
2015	Best Actor in a Supporting Role	Foxcatcher	Nominated	
2016	Best Actor in a Supporting Role	Spotlight	Nominated	
Britannia Awards
2014	Britannia Humanitarian Award		Honored	

=== Critics' Choice Awards ===
Year	Category	Nominated work	Result	Ref.
Critics' Choice Movie Awards
2011	Best Supporting Actor	The Kids Are All Right	Nominated	
2015	Best Supporting Actor	Foxcatcher	Nominated	
2016	Best Supporting Actor	Spotlight	Nominated	
2024	Best Supporting Actor	Poor Things	Nominated	
Critics' Choice Television Awards
2014	Best Actor in a Movie/Miniseries	The Normal Heart	Nominated	
2021	Best Actor in a Movie/Miniseries	I Know This Much Is True	Nominated	
2026	Best Actor in a Drama Series	Task	Nominated	
Critics' Choice Super Awards
2026	Best Actor in an Action Series	Task	Nominated	

=== Emmy Awards ===
Year	Category	Nominated work	Result	Ref.
Primetime Emmy Awards
2014	Outstanding Television Movie	The Normal Heart	Won	
2014	Outstanding Lead Actor in a Limited or Series or Movie	The Normal Heart	Nominated	
2020	Outstanding Lead Actor in a Limited or Series or Movie	I Know This Much Is True	Won	
2026	Outstanding Lead Actor in a Drama Series	Task	Nominated	

=== Golden Globe Awards ===
Year	Category	Nominated work	Result	Ref.
2015	Best Supporting Actor – Motion Picture	Foxcatcher	Nominated	
2015	Best Miniseries or Television Film	The Normal Heart	Nominated	
2015	Best Actor – Miniseries or Television Film	The Normal Heart	Nominated	
2016	Best Actor – Motion Picture Musical or Comedy	Infinitely Polar Bear	Nominated	
2021	Best Actor – Miniseries or Television Film	I Know This Much Is True	Won	
2024	Best Supporting Actor – Motion Picture	Poor Things	Nominated	
2026	Best Actor in a Television Series – Drama	Task	Nominated	

=== Grammy Awards ===
Year	Category	Nominated work	Result	Ref.
2018	Best Spoken Word Album	Our Revolution: A Future to Believe In	Nominated	

=== Screen Actors Guild Awards ===
Year	Category	Nominated work	Result	Ref.
2011	Outstanding Cast in a Motion Picture	The Kids Are All Right	Nominated	
2011	Outstanding Actor in a Supporting Role	The Kids Are All Right	Nominated	
2015	Outstanding Actor in a Supporting Role	Foxcatcher	Nominated	
2015	Outstanding Actor in a Miniseries or Television Movie	The Normal Heart	Won	
2017	Outstanding Cast in a Motion Picture	Spotlight	Won	
2021	Outstanding Actor in a Miniseries or Television Movie	I Know This Much Is True	Won	

=== Tony Awards ===
Year	Category	Nominated work	Result	Ref.
2006	Best Featured Actor in a Play	Awake and Sing!	Nominated	

== Miscellaneous awards ==
Organizations	Year	Category	Work	Result	Ref.
AACTA Awards	2015	Best Supporting Actor	Foxcatcher	Nominated	
Awards Circuit Community Awards	2004	Best Cast Ensemble	Eternal Sunshine of the Spotless Mind	Nominated	
Awards Circuit Community Awards	2010	Best Performance by an Actor in a Supporting Role	The Kids Are All Right	Nominated	
Awards Circuit Community Awards	2014	Best Actor in a Supporting Role	Foxcatcher	Nominated	
Awards Circuit Community Awards	2015	Best Actor in a Supporting Role	Spotlight	Nominated	
Awards Circuit Community Awards	2015	Best Cast Ensemble	Spotlight	Won	
AARP Movies for Grownups Awards	2021	Best Actor	I Know This Much Is True	Won	
Capri Hollywood International Film Festival	2023	Best Supporting Actor	Poor Things	Won	
CinEuphoria Awards	2015	Best Ensemble	The Normal Heart	Won	
Gold Derby Awards	2005	Ensemble Cast	Eternal Sunshine of the Spotless Mind	Nominated	
Gold Derby Awards	2011	Supporting Actor	The Kids Are All Right	Nominated	
Gold Derby Awards	2011	Ensemble Cast	The Kids Are All Right	Won	
Gold Derby Awards	2014	TV Movie/Miniseries Lead Actor	The Normal Heart	Won	
Gold Derby Awards	2015	Supporting Actor	Foxcatcher	Nominated	
Gold Derby Awards	2016	Ensemble Cast	Spotlight	Won	
Gold Derby Awards	2020	Movie/Limited Series Actor	I Know This Much Is True	Nominated	
Golden Schmoes Awards	2014	Best Supporting Actor of the Year	Foxcatcher	Nominated	
Gotham Awards	2010	Best Ensemble Performance	The Kids Are All Right	Nominated	
Gotham Awards	2014	Best Ensemble Performance	Foxcatcher	Won	
Gotham Awards	2015	Best Ensemble Performance	Spotlight	Won	
Hollywood Film Awards	2014	Best Ensemble of the Year	Foxcatcher	Won	
Independent Spirit Awards	2001	Best Male Lead	You Can Count on Me	Nominated	
Independent Spirit Awards	2011	Best Supporting Male	The Kids Are All Right	Nominated	
Independent Spirit Awards	2015	Special Distinction Award	Foxcatcher	Won	
Independent Spirit Awards	2016	Robert Altman Award	Spotlight	Won	
International Online Cinema Awards	2005	Best Ensemble Cast	Eternal Sunshine of the Spotless Mind	Nominated	
International Online Cinema Awards	2015	Best Supporting Actor	Foxcatcher	Nominated	
International Online Cinema Awards	2020	Best Actor in a Limited Series or TV Movie	I Know This Much Is True	Nominated	
Italian Online Movie Awards	2011	Best Supporting Actor	The Kids Are All Right	Nominated	
Italian Online Movie Awards	2015	Best Supporting Actor	Foxcatcher	Nominated	
MTV Movie + TV Awards	2005	Best Musical Performance (with Jennifer Garner)	13 Going on 30	Nominated	
MTV Movie + TV Awards	2013	Best Fight (with The Avengers cast)	The Avengers	Won	
MTV Movie + TV Awards	2013	Best Hero	The Avengers	Nominated	
MTV Movie + TV Awards	2013	Best On-Screen Duo (with Robert Downey Jr.)	The Avengers	Nominated	
MTV Movie + TV Awards	2016	Best Fight (with Robert Downey Jr.)	Avengers: Age of Ultron	Nominated	
MTV Movie + TV Awards	2018	Best Fight (with Chris Hemsworth)	Thor: Ragnarok	Nominated	
Satellite Awards	2008	Best Actor in a Motion Picture, Comedy or Musical	The Brothers Bloom	Nominated	
Satellite Awards	2008	Best Actor in a Motion Picture, Drama	What Doesn't Kill You	Nominated	
Satellite Awards	2015	Best Actor in a Supporting Role	Foxcatcher	Nominated	
Satellite Awards	2015	Best Actor in a Miniseries or Television Film	The Normal Heart	Won	
Satellite Awards	2016	Best Actor in a Supporting Role	Spotlight	Nominated	
Satellite Awards	2019	Best Actor in a Motion Picture, Drama	Dark Waters	Nominated	
Satellite Awards	2021	Best Actor in a Miniseries or Television Film	I Know This Much Is True	Nominated	
Satellite Awards	2024	Best Actor in a Supporting Role	Poor Things	Won	
Scream Awards	2010	Best Supporting Actor	Shutter Island	Nominated	
Teen Choice Awards	2004	Choice Movie: Chemistry	13 Going on 30	Nominated	
Teen Choice Awards	2004	Choice Movie: Liplock	13 Going on 30	Nominated	
Teen Choice Awards	2004	Choice Movie: Actor - Comedy	13 Going on 30	Nominated	
Teen Choice Awards	2012	Choice Movie: Hissy Fit	The Avengers	Nominated	
Teen Choice Awards	2015	Choice Movie: Fight	Avengers: Age of Ultron	Nominated	
Teen Choice Awards	2018	Choice Movie Actor: Sci-Fi	Thor: Ragnarok	Nominated	
Teen Choice Awards	2018	Choice Movie: Hissy Fit	Avengers: Infinity War	Nominated	

== Critics associations ==
Organizations	Year	Category	Work	Result	Ref.
Awards Circuit Community	2004	Best Acting Ensemble	Eternal Sunshine of the Spotless Mind	Nominated	
Boston Society of Film Critics	2000	Best Actor	You Can Count on Me	Nominated	
Boston Society of Film Critics	2010	Best Ensemble Cast	The Kids Are All Right	Nominated	
Chicago Film Critics Association	2000	Best Actor	You Can Count on Me	Nominated	
Chicago Film Critics Association	2010	Best Supporting Actor	The Kids Are All Right	Nominated	
Dallas-Fort Worth Film Critics Association	2000	Best Supporting Actor	You Can Count on Me	Nominated	
Dallas-Fort Worth Film Critics Association	2014	Best Supporting Actor	Foxcatcher	Nominated	
Detroit Film Critics Society	2010	Best Supporting Actor	The Kids Are All Right	Nominated	
Detroit Film Critics Society	2014	Best Supporting Actor	Foxcatcher	Nominated	
Dublin Film Critics' Circle	2010	Best Actor	The Kids Are All Right	Nominated	
Dublin Film Critics' Circle	2015	Best Supporting Actor	Spotlight	Nominated	
Florida Film Critics Circle	2015	Best Supporting Actor	Spotlight	Nominated	
Georgia Film Critics Association	2015	Best Supporting Actor	Spotlight	Nominated	
Houston Film Critics Society	2010	Best Supporting Actor	Foxcatcher	Nominated	
Houston Film Critics Society	2015	Best Supporting Actor	Spotlight	Nominated	
Los Angeles Film Critics Association	2000	New Generation Award	You Can Count on Me	Won	
National Society of Film Critics	2000	Best Actor	You Can Count on Me	Nominated	
National Society of Film Critics	2015	Best Supporting Actor	Spotlight	Nominated	
Nevada Film Critics Society	2015	Best Ensemble Cast	Spotlight	Won	
New York Film Critics Circle	2010	Best Supporting Actor	The Kids Are All Right	Won	
Online Film Critics Society	2010	Best Supporting Actor	The Kids Are All Right	Nominated	
Online Film Critics Society	2014	Best Supporting Actor	Foxcatcher	Nominated	
Online Film Critics Society	2015	Best Supporting Actor	Spotlight	Nominated	
Phoenix Film Critics Society	2010	Best Ensemble Acting	The Kids Are All Right	Nominated	
Phoenix Film Critics Society	2014	Best Actor in a Supporting Role	Foxcatcher	Nominated	
Phoenix Film Critics Society	2015	Best Supporting Actor	Spotlight	Nominated	
San Diego Film Critics Society	2000	Best Actor	You Can Count on Me	Nominated	
San Diego Film Critics Society	2010	Best Supporting Actor	Foxcatcher	Nominated	
San Francisco Film Critics Circle	2010	Best Supporting Actor	Foxcatcher	Nominated	
Seattle Film Critics	2010	Best Supporting Actor	Foxcatcher	Nominated	
Southeastern Film Critics Association	2000	Best Actor	You Can Count on Me	Nominated	
St. Louis Film Critics Association	2010	Best Supporting Actor	Foxcatcher	Nominated	
St. Louis Film Critics Association	2015	Best Supporting Actor	Spotlight	Nominated	
Toronto Film Critics Association Awards	2000	Best Performance, Male	You Can Count on Me	Nominated	
Vancouver Film Critics Circle	2000	Best Actor	You Can Count on Me	Won	
Vancouver Film Critics Circle	2009	Best Supporting Actor in a Canadian Film	Blindness	Nominated	
Vancouver Film Critics Circle	2014	Best Supporting Actor	Foxcatcher	Nominated	
Washington DC Area Film Critics Association	2004	Best Acting Ensemble	Eternal Sunshine of the Spotless Mind	Nominated	
Washington DC Area Film Critics Association	2014	Best Supporting Actor	Foxcatcher	Nominated	

== See also ==
- Mark Ruffalo on screen and stage
