= Mark Ruffalo =

American actor (born 1967)

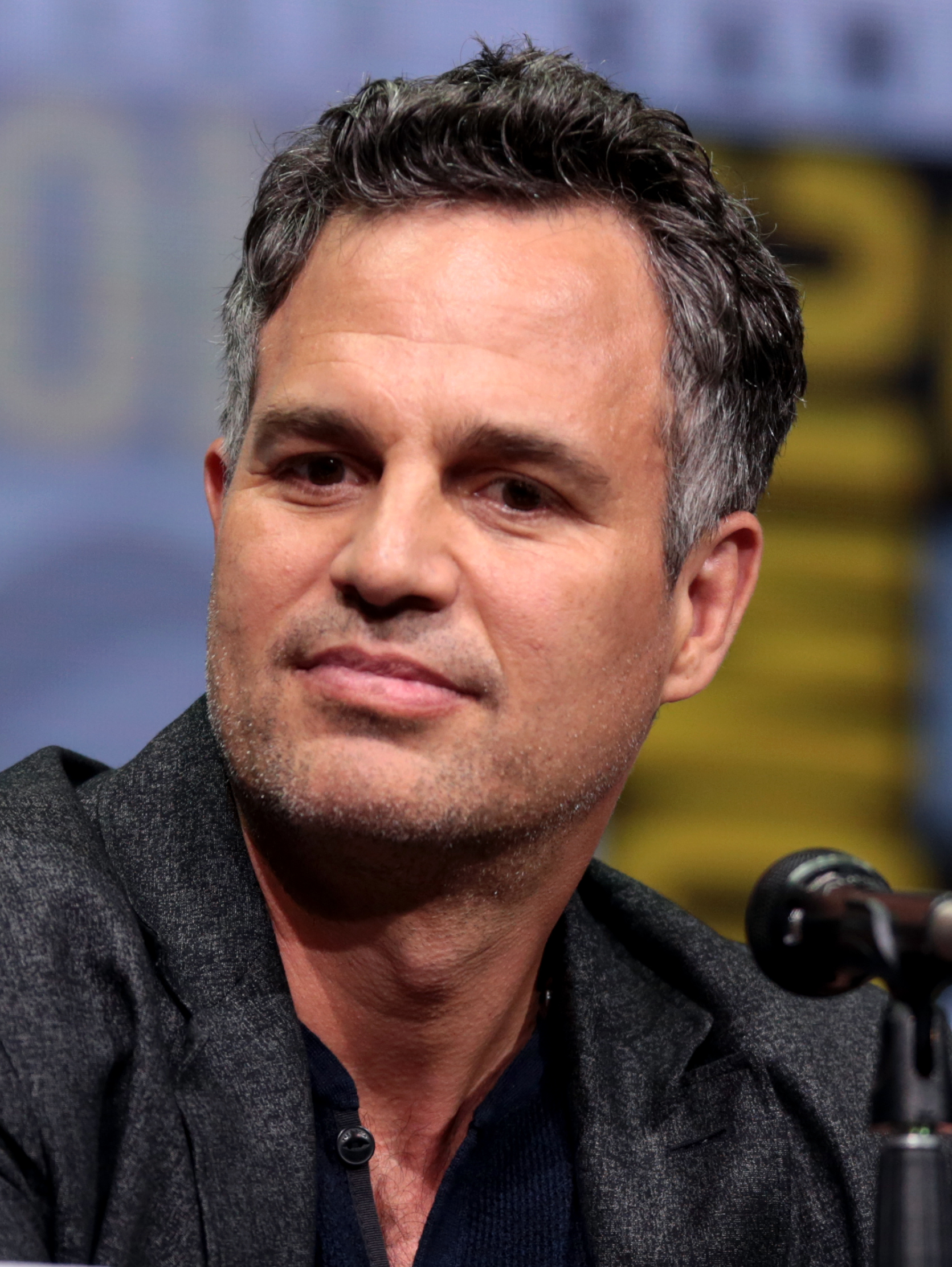
- Ruffalo at the 2017 San Diego Comic-Con
- Born: Mark Alan Ruffalo; November 22, 1967 (age 59); Kenosha, Wisconsin, U.S.
- Occupations: Actor; producer
- Years active: 1989–present
- Works: Full list
- Spouse: Sunrise Coigney (m. 2000)
- Children: 3, including Keen
- Awards: Full list

Mark Alan Ruffalo (/ˈrʌfəloʊ/; born November 22, 1967) is an American actor and producer who began his career in the late 1980s and first gained recognition for his work in Kenneth Lonergan's play This Is Our Youth (1996) and drama film You Can Count on Me (2000). He went on to star in the romantic comedies 13 Going on 30 (2004) and Just like Heaven (2005), and the thrillers In the Cut (2003), Zodiac (2007), and Shutter Island (2010). He received a Tony Award nomination for his supporting role in the Broadway revival of Awake and Sing! in 2006. Ruffalo has gained international recognition for playing Bruce Banner / Hulk in the Marvel Cinematic Universe, beginning with the film The Avengers (2012).

Ruffalo earned a record-tying four nominations for the Academy Award for Best Supporting Actor for playing a sperm donor in The Kids Are All Right (2010), Dave Schultz in Foxcatcher (2014), Michael Rezendes in Spotlight (2015), and a debauched lawyer in Poor Things (2023). He won an Actor Award for Outstanding Male Actor for playing a gay activist in the television drama film The Normal Heart (2015), and a Primetime Emmy Award for Outstanding Lead Actor for his dual role as identical twins in the miniseries I Know This Much Is True (2020).

== Early life ==
Ruffalo was born on November 22, 1967, in Kenosha, Wisconsin. His mother, Marie Rose (née Hébert), is a hairdresser and stylist, while his father, Frank Lawrence Ruffalo Jr., worked as a construction painter. He has two sisters, Tanya Marie, who died in 2023, and Nicole, and a brother, Scott, who died in 2008. His father is of Italian descent, from Marano Marchesato, Calabria, and his mother is of French Canadian and Italian ancestry. His father was a Baháʼí, while his mother was Christian:

I grew up in a household that had three religions in it, (born-again) Christianity, Catholicism and Baháʼísm, so there were different viewpoints and a lot of debate about that, and I immediately began to understand that all these people that I loved very much had very strong feelings about faith, but all of them were valid to me. I felt that none of them, my grandmother, my father or my mother, was better or worse than the other.

Ruffalo attended both Catholic and progressive schools throughout his education. Ruffalo has described himself as having been a "happy kid", although he struggled with undiagnosed dyslexia and ADHD as a child and a young adult. Ruffalo spent his teen years in Virginia Beach, Virginia, where his father worked. He competed in wrestling in junior high and high school in Wisconsin and Virginia. Ruffalo graduated from First Colonial High School in Virginia Beach in 1986, where he acted for the Patriot Playhouse. He moved with his family to San Diego, California, and later to Los Angeles, where he took classes at the Stella Adler Academy and co-founded the Orpheus Theatre Company. With the theater company, he wrote, directed, and starred in a number of plays. He also spent close to a decade working as a bartender.

== Career ==
=== 1989–2002: Early film roles and theatre ===
Ruffalo made his screen debut in an episode of CBS Summer Playhouse (1989), followed by minor film roles. Ruffalo played Vinnie Webber, a minor character in Series 1 Episode 9 of Due South, first broadcast in Canada in 1994. During this time he made his film debut in the horror film Mirror, Mirror II: Raven Dance (1994) followed by Mirror, Mirror III: The Voyeur (1995). He starred as Warren Straub in the original cast of the Kenneth Lonergan play This Is Our Youth (1996) off-Broadway. Lonergan was a founding member of Naked Angels, a theater company that Ruffalo also belonged to. Ruffalo acted opposite Josh Hamilton and Missy Yager.

Ruffalo had minor roles in films including The Dentist (1996), the low-key crime comedy Safe Men (1998), and Ang Lee's Civil War western Ride with the Devil (1999). He reunited with Kenneth Lonergan acting in his film You Can Count on Me (2000). Ruffalo portrayed Laura Linney's character's brother. The film received critical acclaim and two Academy Award nominations. He received favorable reviews for his performance in this film, often earning comparisons to the young Marlon Brando, and won awards from the Los Angeles Film Critics Association and Montreal World Film Festival. His next role was in 2001 in Rod Lurie's The Last Castle playing a bookie in a military prison alongside Robert Redford. It led to other supporting roles, including the films XX/XY (2002), Isabel Coixet's My Life Without Me, John Woo's Windtalkers (2003), Jane Campion's In the Cut (2003), and We Don't Live Here Anymore (2004). Ruffalo later described his in role in The Last Castle as "seminal to me".

=== 2003–2005: Romantic comedies ===
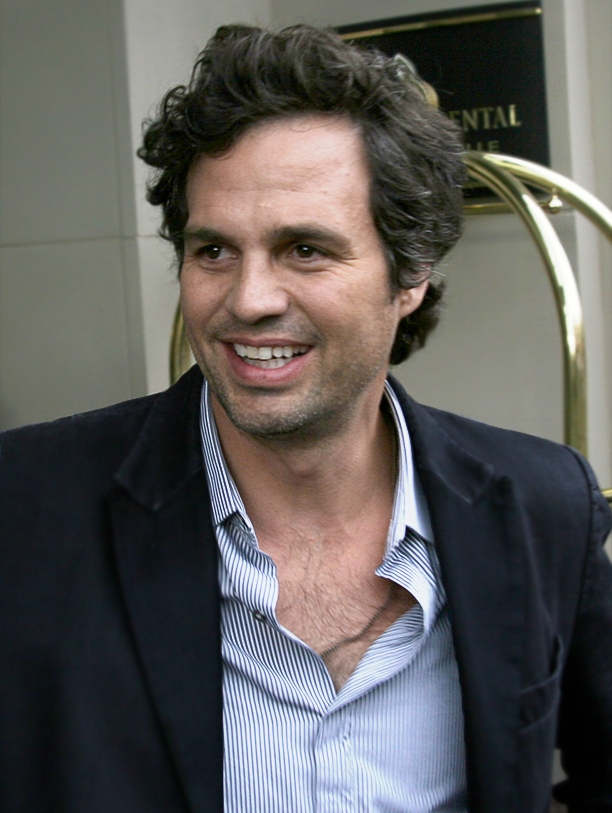
Ruffalo at the 2007 Toronto International Film Festival

In the mid-2000s, Ruffalo appeared as a romantic lead in numerous romantic comedies starting with View from the Top (2003) starring Gwyneth Paltrow. He then starred opposite Jennifer Garner in 13 Going on 30 (2004) which has since become a cult classic. That same year, he also acted in Michel Gondry's romantic fantasy drama Eternal Sunshine of the Spotless Mind (2004) starring Kate Winslet and Jim Carrey. In the film Ruffalo plays a supporting role as Stan who is a technician in charge of erasing people's memories of each other. That same year, he acted opposite Jamie Foxx and Tom Cruise as a narcotics detective in Michael Mann's crime thriller Collateral (2004). Todd McCarthy of Variety praised Ruffalo: "[He] provides an extra dimension of intelligence to what initially looks like a stock cop role." He starred in Just Like Heaven (2005) with Reese Witherspoon which was adapted from the French novel by Marc Levy entitled If Only It Were True. That same year, he acted in the Rob Reiner romantic comedy Rumor Has It (2005) starring Jennifer Aniston, Kevin Costner, and Shirley MacLaine.

=== 2006–2011: Expansion into Broadway, direction, and dramatic roles ===
In 2006, Ruffalo starred in the political drama remake All the King's Men acting opposite Sean Penn, Kate Winslet, Jude Law, and Anthony Hopkins. The film was adapted by Steven Zaillian based on the Robert Penn Warren 1946 novel of the same name. Also in 2006, he made his Broadway debut starring as Moe Axelrod in Clifford Odets's Awake and Sing! at the Belasco Theatre in New York. Ruffalo acted alongside Lauren Ambrose, Pablo Schreiber, and Zoe Wanamaker. Charles Isherwood of The New York Times wrote of his performance, "Nobody slings it with more panache than Mark Ruffalo, the soulful movie and stage actor making his Broadway debut here." David Rooney of Variety wrote: "The most arresting work onstage comes from Ruffalo, channeling prickly charm into a proud man who uses glib aggression to camouflage his frustration. Ruffalo's scenes with Ambrose are the drama's most electric moments." The role earned him a nomination for Tony Award for Best Featured Actor in a Play.

In March 2007, Ruffalo appeared in David Fincher's crime thriller Zodiac as SFPD homicide inspector Dave Toschi, who ran the investigation to find and apprehend the Zodiac killer from 1969 through most of the 1970s. He acted opposite Jake Gyllenhaal and Robert Downey Jr. Critic Roger Ebert described Ruffalo's performance by writing that "Ruffalo plays him not as a hotshot but as a dogged officer who does things by the book because he believes in the book". Toschi was role model for the Clint Eastwood film Dirty Harry. That same year, Ruffalo played divorced lawyer Dwight Arno, who accidentally kills a child and speeds away, in Terry George's film Reservation Road, based on the novel by John Burnham Schwartz.

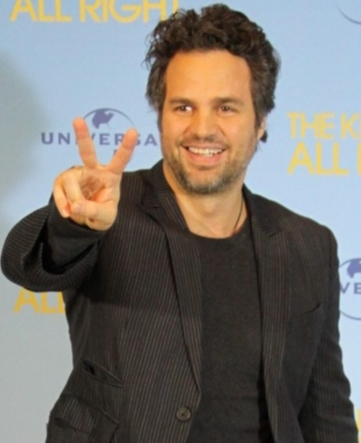
Ruffalo at the premiere of The Kids Are All Right in Berlin (2010)

In 2008, Ruffalo starred as a con man in The Brothers Bloom with Adrien Brody and Rachel Weisz and co-starred with Julianne Moore in Blindness. 2008 also saw Ruffalo in Brian Goodman's What Doesn't Kill You with Ethan Hawke and Amanda Peet, which was shown at the Toronto International Film Festival. In 2009, he played a brief role in the film Where the Wild Things Are as Max's mother's boyfriend. Ruffalo directed a number of plays during his time at the Orpheus Theatre Company, and made his feature film directorial debut with 2010 indie film Sympathy for Delicious starring himself, Juliette Lewis, and Laura Linney, which premiered at the Sundance Film Festival and won the Special Jury Prize. In March 2010, Ruffalo signed with the Creative Artists Agency (CAA); in June 2010, he signed on with the United Talent Agency (UTA).

In 2010, Ruffalo co-starred in the Martin Scorsese thriller Shutter Island as U.S. Marshal Chuck Aule, the partner of Leonardo DiCaprio's character Teddy Daniels. Also in 2010, he starred in Lisa Cholodenko's The Kids Are All Right, with Annette Bening and Julianne Moore. Ruffalo stated in an interview that he approached Cholodenko after watching High Art and said he would love to work with her. Years later, she called Ruffalo and said she wrote a script and had him in mind for the part. Justin Lowe of The Hollywood Reporter praised all three leads for their chemistry and performances writing, "Moore, Bening and Ruffalo all deliver endearingly quirky comic performances". His role earned him an Academy Award nomination for Best Supporting Actor.

=== 2012–2019: Marvel films ===
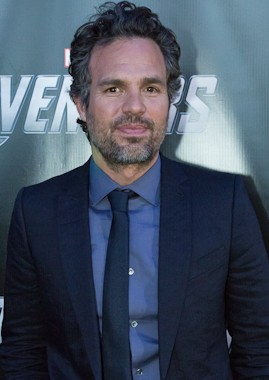
Ruffalo at the Toronto premiere of The Avengers in 2012

Ruffalo starred in The Avengers (2012), the sixth installment of the Marvel Cinematic Universe, replacing Edward Norton as Dr. Bruce Banner/The Hulk. Peter Bradshaw of The Guardian praised Ruffalo's work writing, "Ruffalo actually makes Bruce and Hulk interesting, even droll characters (he also plays the monster in mo-cap), superior to the Eric Bana and Edward Norton incarnations, and his version ingeniously locates the big green monster's secret not in the over-rehearsed subject of 'anger management' but depression and self-hate." He reprised the role again in Iron Man 3 (2013), and in Avengers: Age of Ultron (2015).

In 2013, Ruffalo starred in the romantic comedy Begin Again acting alongside Keira Knightley. The film received positive reviews and was a financial success. The following year, Ruffalo starred as Ned Weeks in the HBO television adaptation of Larry Kramer's AIDS-era play, The Normal Heart (2014), his performance earned him an Emmy nomination. He says he has had an outpouring of support for his performance:

I've never had so sincere and vulnerable a response from people for anything that I've ever done. ... And of everything that I've done since I've been on social media, which hasn't been that long, by the way, I haven't had such an overwhelmingly positive response as I have from The Normal Heart directly to me. And it's a blessing, man. If this is it, if I have a piano dropped on me tomorrow, then I would go down thinking, "You know what, I did okay as far as my career goes, because that's a gift. That's rare."

Also in 2014, Ruffalo received his second Academy Award nomination for his portrayal of wrestler Dave Schultz in the biographical drama Foxcatcher directed by Bennett Miller. Ruffalo co-starred alongside Steve Carell, Channing Tatum, and Vanessa Redgrave. Peter Bradshaw of The Guardian wrote of their performances, "Tatum and Ruffalo, as Mark and Dave, have outdone themselves. These actors give what seems to me the most compelling portrayal of brothers since Joe Pesci and Robert De Niro in Scorsese's Raging Bull."

In 2015, Ruffalo starred as a father of two with bipolar disorder in the independent comedy film Infinitely Polar Bear, for which he earned a Golden Globe Award for Best Actor – Motion Picture Musical or Comedy nomination. Also in 2015, he portrayed journalist Michael Rezendes in the drama film Spotlight, for which he earned his third Academy Award nomination and a BAFTA Award nomination. Ruffalo acted opposite Michael Keaton, Rachel McAdams, John Slattery, and Liev Schreiber. Ruffalo told The Hollywood Reporter that he met with Rezendes and studied him as research for the film saying, "I spent a lot of time with the real journalist, I had meals with him. I talked with him for hours. I sat next to him at work, I watched him work the phones. I watched him write his stories. I talked to him about his life and his family. I had him give me tours of Boston. As much as I could soak him up seemed to be the most important part."

Ruffalo portrayed Agent Dylan Rhodes in Now You See Me 2 (2016) and executive produced the romantic drama Anything (2017). He returned to Broadway in the revival of the Arthur Miller play The Price (2017) at the American Airlines Theatre. Ruffalo acted opposite Danny DeVito and Tony Shalhoub. Marilyn Stasio of Variety wrote, "Ruffalo and DeVito clearly get a kick out of the buying and selling rituals of Victor and Solomon. There is warmth in their tones and mutual respect in their exchange of confidences". In 2019, he starred as Robert Bilott in the Todd Haynes directed legal thriller Dark Waters which he also produced. The film co-starred Anne Hathaway, Tim Robbins, Bill Pullman, and Victor Garber. During this time he reprised his role of Bruce Banner in Thor: Ragnarok (2017), Avengers: Infinity War (2018), Captain Marvel (2019), and Avengers: Endgame (2019). He has been noted for spoiling the endings of Avengers: Infinity War a year ahead of theatrical release, as well as Avengers: Endgame a few weeks ahead of release.

=== 2020–present: Critical resurgence and continued work with Marvel ===
In 2020, Ruffalo portrayed dual roles of Dominick Birdsey/Thomas Birdsey in the HBO limited series I Know This Much Is True where he also served as an executive producer. Daniel D'Addario of Variety wrote, "Ruffalo's performances carry the series. This is his two-man show, with supporting characters glimmering in and out". For his role he earned the Primetime Emmy Award for Outstanding Lead Actor in a Limited or Anthology Series or Movie. Ruffalo has continued to appear as Bruce Banner/The Hulk in Shang-Chi and the Legend of the Ten Rings (2021) and in the Disney+ series She-Hulk: Attorney at Law (2022).

In 2022, Ruffalo acted in the Netflix science fiction action comedy The Adam Project opposite Ryan Reynolds, Jennifer Garner, and Zoe Saldaña. In 2023, he starred in the Yorgos Lanthimos directed black comedy fantasy film Poor Things starring Emma Stone and Willem Dafoe. The film premiered at the Venice International Film Festival where it received the Golden Lion. Maureen Lee Lenker of Entertainment Weekly wrote, "Ruffalo appears to be having the time of his life, chewing the scenery with a manic glee. He's built a career playing solid, decent men, and what fun it is to watch him play a reprobate cad [and] a puffed-up vainglorious peacock, a man whose ego is the size of an entire continent". He received Critics' Choice, Golden Globe, and Academy Award nominations for his performance. The same year, he played Daniel LeBlanc in the Netflix miniseries All the Light We Cannot See (2023). The series is based on Anthony Doerr's Pulitzer Prize winning novel of the same name, and was released November 2, 2023.

In 2025, Ruffalo portrayed Kenneth Marshall in the Bong Joon-ho directed science fiction film Mickey 17. He acted opposite Robert Pattinson, Steven Yeun, and Toni Collette. The film is based on the novel Mickey7 by Edward Ashton. Also in 2025, he starred in the HBO crime drama television series Task. The Rotten Tomatoes critics consensus described his performance in the series as "superb".

In 2026, Ruffalo acted opposite Marvel co-star Chris Hemsworth in the crime thriller film Crime 101. In May 2025, it was confirmed that Ruffalo had been added to the cast of the film Good Sex, opposite his Marvel co-star Natalie Portman, with a Netflix release announced for 2026. In August 2025, it was confirmed that he would be reprising his role as Bruce Banner in the film Spider-Man: Brand New Day, with a theatrical release announced for July 2026.

In May 2026, it was announced that Ruffalo would voice Nero in the Pixar animated film Gatto, which will be released in 2027.

== Personal life ==
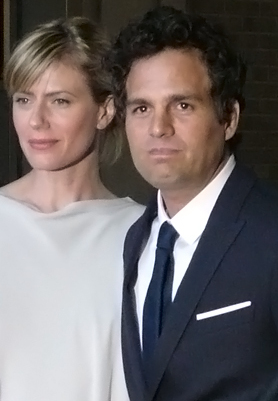
Ruffalo with wife Sunrise Coigney at the premiere of What Doesn't Kill You (2008)

Ruffalo married Sunrise Coigney in 2000. They have three children. After completing work on the film The Last Castle, Ruffalo was diagnosed with a vestibular schwannoma, a type of brain tumor also known as an acoustic neuroma. The tumor was found to be benign; however, the surgery to remove the mass resulted in partial facial paralysis and affected his hearing. The paralysis subsided after a year, but Ruffalo remains deaf in his left ear.

On December 1, 2008, Ruffalo's younger brother, Scott, was found outside his home on North Palm Drive in Beverly Hills with an execution-style bullet wound to the head. Scott was taken to a hospital, but died the following week. The case remains officially unsolved. A Saudi woman, who had initially been charged, Shaha Mishaal Adham (then 26 years old), was released from the Beverly Hills jail for what police records say was "insufficient evidence, per the warrant". Her lawyer stated that Scott Ruffalo had been playing with the gun.

Ruffalo and his family live in Sullivan County, New York, and he describes the Catskills as his "home". Ruffalo also owns two apartments in New York City, one for business and another as an investment. Ruffalo's mother and stepfather live in Boothbay Harbor, Maine, where he and his family occasionally spend their summers. In May 2022, Ruffalo was named in a lawsuit against the producers of I Know This Much Is True by residents of Ellenville, New York alleging improper cleanup of a fire that broke out on the set of a car dealership used as a show location. The lawsuit claims that the residents suffered physical and emotional injuries and added that the fire caused damage to their homes and exposed them to toxic fumes.

== Activism and political views ==
=== Politics ===
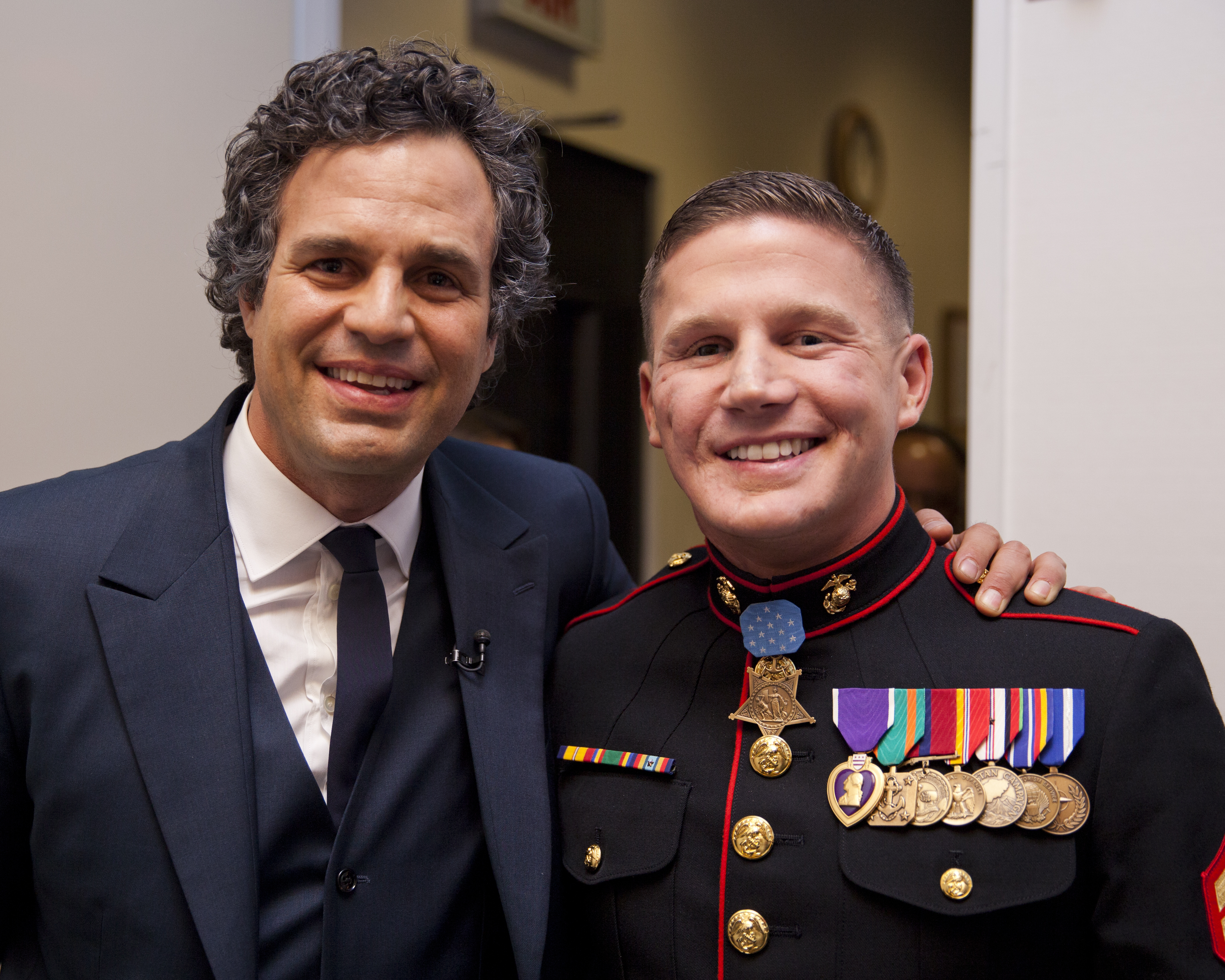
Ruffalo with Medal of Honor recipient Retired U.S. Marine Corps Cpl. Kyle Carpenter, 2014

During an interview in 2007, Ruffalo stated that his first reaction to the September 11 attacks was "buildings don't fall down like that". During the 2014 Brazilian presidential election, Ruffalo initially expressed support for Marina Silva's candidacy. However, he publicly withdrew his endorsement, citing changes in her party's government platform regarding LGBT rights, as well as the candidate's opposition to gay marriage and women's reproductive rights.

In the 2016 Democratic Party presidential primaries, Ruffalo supported Democratic candidate Bernie Sanders. After the primaries, Ruffalo endorsed Democratic presidential nominee Hillary Clinton. While on The Late Show with Stephen Colbert, Ruffalo endorsed Senator Bernie Sanders for president in the 2020 U.S. presidential election, stating "you know when he gets in the office, he is going to be fighting for us". In June 2017, Ruffalo posted a petition on Twitter urging NBC to stop hiring white conservative commentators.

In April 2017, Ruffalo expressed support for recognition of the Armenian genocide.

Ruffalo endorsed Labour Party leader Jeremy Corbyn in the 2017 UK general election. He tweeted: "Because @jeremycorbyn offers people an alternative to the Corporate status quo, which never ends well for them, I humbly endorse Corbyn." Ruffalo signed a letter supporting Corbyn, whom he described as "a beacon of hope in the struggle against emergent far-right nationalism, xenophobia and racism in much of the democratic world", and endorsed him in the 2019 UK general election.

In November 2021, Ruffalo criticized the not-guilty ruling in the case of Kyle Rittenhouse in his hometown of Kenosha, Wisconsin, and said that the people that Rittenhouse shot were victims of murder. In April 2022, Ruffalo urged voters to check voter ID requirements in their states through posts to his social media. Ruffalo cited VoteRiders as a source of assistance for voter ID requirements across the United States.

In the 2024 U.S. presidential election, Ruffalo endorsed Democratic candidate Kamala Harris. He also supported the Green Party in the 2024 British Columbia general election. He took part in the June 2025 No Kings protests, where he marched along with other celebrities such as Susan Sarandon. In a Zeteo interview with Mehdi Hasan in September 2025, Ruffalo criticized Democratic party leadership, specifically Chuck Schumer and Hakeem Jeffries, saying they are "the absolute antithesis of what the Democratic Party needs right now". At the 2026 Golden Globe Awards, Ruffalo wore a pin that read "Be Good" in remembrance and support of Renée Good.

=== Environmentalism ===
In 2008, Ruffalo expressed concern that gas companies were eyeing his family's land in Callicoon, New York, and New York wrote that Ruffalo, after doing his own investigation, became "anti-fracking's first famous face". On October 4, 2010, Ruffalo appeared on The Rachel Maddow Show to discuss hydraulic fracturing and the FRAC Act of 2009. He claimed in the December 2010 issue of GQ that after he organized screenings in Pennsylvania of a documentary about natural-gas drilling called Gasland, he was placed on a terror advisory list. The Pennsylvania Governor's Office of Homeland Security denied the claim.

Ruffalo founded the Water Defense organization in 2010 to measure and report water contamination in areas affected by industrial pollution and runoff. During the Flint water crisis, Ruffalo stated that corroded lead and galavanized iron pipes could have caused disinfection byproducts. Virginia Tech engineering professor Marc Edwards said that disinfection byproducts do not come from corroded pipes. Water Defense's Chief Technology Officer Scott Smith said that Flint's tap water contained hazardous levels of chloroform. Edwards said the levels of chloroform were not a cause for alarm. Water Defense promoted a device known as the WaterBug, which could produce incorrect results due to nonsterile sampling techniques and measuring the presence of chemicals in the ambient air as well as the water. An apparent conflict of interest was also present, as Smith invented the WaterBug and had previously marketed it to various groups facing spill cleanup events. He did not profit from any business dealings in Flint. Ruffalo later responded to criticisms, stating that "Water Defense has never said it is not safe to bathe or shower in Flint... The people of Flint have every right to demand to know exactly what is in their water and to maintain a certain degree of skepticism based on what they have been through.” Smith left Water Defense in 2017. Ruffalo's work with Water Defense influenced his portrayal of Robert Bilott in Dark Waters (2019).

In March 2016, Ruffalo narrated and produced Dear President Obama: The Clean Energy Revolution Is Now, a documentary by director Jon Bowermaster which looks at President Barack Obama's environmental tenure and legacy concerning the massive expansion of oil and natural-gas drilling. In October 2017, Ruffalo actively supported the Standing Rock Sioux Reservation in their opposition to the Dakota Access Pipeline project.

In 2019, Ruffalo starred in and co-produced Dark Waters, which spotlighted another one of his environmental concerns with its true-life depiction of a corporate lawyer's relentless pursuit of justice to expose poisonous pollution by chemical behemoth DuPont. In June 2020, Ruffalo appeared in a webinar conference for the Irish Green Party to encourage members to accept the recently negotiated programme for government, agreed between the party, Fine Gael and Fianna Fáil. In 2020, Ruffalo praised the closure of the Indian Point Nuclear Power Plant, and called for the closure of additional nuclear power plants.

=== Anti-war activism ===
In October 2019, Ruffalo criticized Ellen DeGeneres's friendship with former US president George W. Bush, tweeting that "until [he] is brought to justice for the crimes of the Iraq War, (including American-led torture, Iraqi deaths & displacement, and the deep scars—emotional & otherwise—inflicted on our military that served his folly), we can't even begin to talk about kindness."

In March 2022, Ruffalo expressed support for Ukraine during Russia's invasion and referred to Ukrainian president Volodymyr Zelenskyy as a hero. He criticized political commentator Tucker Carlson, calling him a "crony" for Russian president Vladimir Putin.

In September 2023, Ruffalo raised awareness for the Armenian humanitarian crisis during the nine-month blockade of Nagorno-Karabakh.

==== Israeli–Palestinian conflict ====
During the 2014 Gaza War, Ruffalo criticized Israel for striking the El-Wafa hospital in Gaza. He questioned allegations that Hamas was using human shields and whether Hamas had kidnapped three Israeli teenagers prior to the war.

In October 2020, speaking to Mehdi Hasan, Ruffalo condemned what he called Israel's "asymmetrical warfare" against the Palestinians, stating, "There is no reason that an ally of America should not be held to the same standards as any other nation in the world", while also relating that he had been called an antisemite for his views, saying, "[It's] really tough to hear. And the fact that so many people will take it to that extreme, when you're talking about that kind of inequality, that kind of oppression, that kind of apartheid."

During the 2021 Israel–Palestine crisis, Ruffalo posted numerous tweets critical of Israel. He later tweeted an apology for suggesting Israel was committing genocide, stating, "It's not accurate, it's inflammatory, disrespectful & is being used to justify antisemitism here & abroad."

Ruffalo signed an October 2023 open letter of Artists4Ceasefire during the Israeli bombardment of Gaza. In November 2023, Ruffalo criticized Israeli prime minister Benjamin Netanyahu for describing the civilian deaths during the Israeli attacks on Gaza as "collateral damage". At the 96th Academy Awards, Ruffalo was one of several celebrities wearing an "Artists Call for Ceasefire Now" pin on his lapel. Ruffalo called out in support of protestors blocking the red carpet at the Awards.

In September 2024, Ruffalo, alongside Susan Sarandon, Cynthia Nixon, and Rosie O'Donnell, signed an open letter from SAG-AFTRA and Sister Guild Members calling for a ceasefire and condemning the "industry's McCarthyist repression of members who acknowledge Palestinian suffering". The letter followed the November 2023 firing of Melissa Barrera from the Scream franchise, due to her comments on the Gaza war in which she equated Gaza to a "concentration camp" and accused Israel of "distorting the Holocaust to boost the Israeli arms industry". In May 2025, Ruffalo signed a letter criticizing the killing of Palestinian photojournalist Fatima Hassouna in an Israeli airstrike. In September 2025, Ruffalo signed an open pledge with Film Workers for Palestine pledging not to work with Israeli film institutions that "are implicated in genocide and apartheid against the Palestinian people".

In August 2026, Ruffalo criticized Oracle and the Ellison family on his Instagram story. In response to a video of an Oracle executive discussing collaboration with the Israeli military and providing them with "really profoundly scary technology", Ruffalo accused both Oracle and the Ellison family of complicity in "what we now have come to see as a genocide" and reaffirmed his opposition to Paramount's takeover bid for Warner Bros. Discovery. Ruffalo also criticized Larry and David Ellison for "crushing workers and consolidating the wealth of the world for their own power and concentrated dominance". He said the merger would be "catastrophic for our film industry" due to job losses, higher cable costs and reduced competition. Paramount criticized Ruffalo's remarks as antisemitic in a formal response. Ruffalo's remarks were also criticized by the pro-Israel groups Creative Community for Peace, the Simon Wiesenthal Center and the Anti-Defamation League, as well as by the CEO of Jewish Federation Los Angeles and industry figures such as Haim Saban, Teddy Schwarzman, Lawrence Bender, Avi Issacharoff, and Ynon Kreiz. In response, Ruffalo called the accusations of antisemitism "appalling and fundamentally dishonest" and stated that he was criticising the actions of Netanyahu and executives who supply military technology to Israel, not Jewish people. Ruffalo was supported by artists including Joel Cohen, Tony Kushner, John Cusack, and Hannah Einbinder, the latter of whom signed an open letter of support alongside more than 180 other Jewish artists and academics.

=== Civil rights ===
Ruffalo is pro-choice. He has explained his opinion by saying: "I don't want to turn back the hands of time to when women shuttled across state lines in the thick of night to resolve an unwanted pregnancy, in a cheap hotel room." Ruffalo has called for an economic revolution, saying that "capitalism today is failing us, killing us, and robbing from our children's future." He has shown support for the LGBTQ community; however, he has received backlash from the transgender community for supporting the casting of Matt Bomer, a cisgender man, to play a trans woman in the film Anything, on which Ruffalo was an executive producer.

In 2015, Ruffalo supported the "Education Is Not a Crime" campaign alongside other artists and intellectuals, including Nazanin Boniadi, Abbas Milani, Mohsen Makhmalbaf, Azar Nafisi, Omid Djalili, Eva LaRue, Mohammad Maleki (former president of the University of Tehran), and Nobel Peace laureates such as Archbishop Desmond Tutu, Shirin Ebadi, Tawakkol Karman, Jody Williams, and Mairead Maguire, to draw attention to the Iranian government's systematic denial of university education to young Baháʼís.

==== Immigration ====
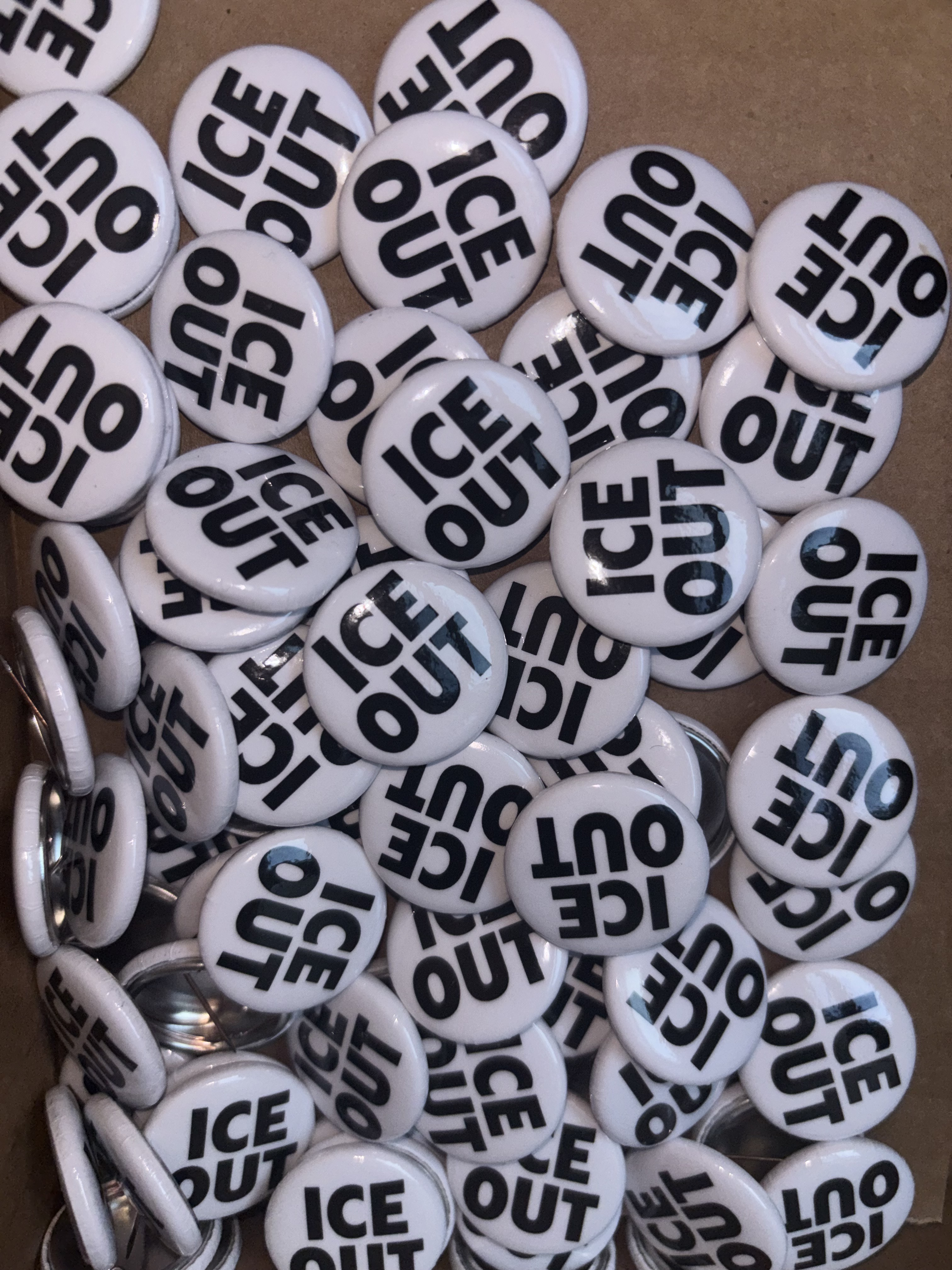
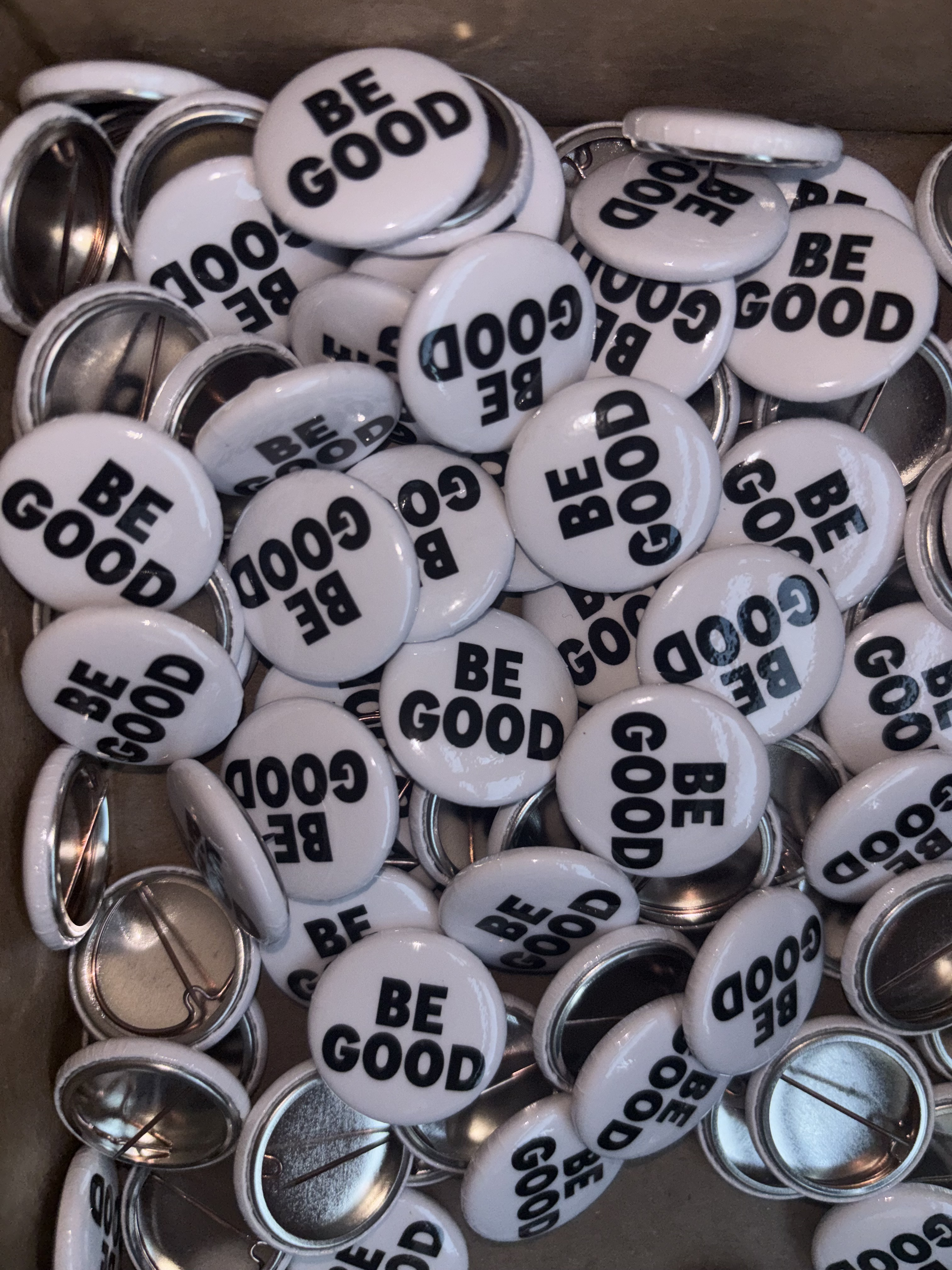
"ICE Out" and "Be Good" buttons worn by Mark Ruffalo and other celebrities in remembrance of Renée Good and in protest against ICE.

In June 2025, Ruffalo participated in the No Kings protest opposing deportation practices under the second presidency of Donald Trump. In a video and accompanying Instagram post, Ruffalo defended immigrants as vital to the U.S. economy and accused the ultra-wealthy of being "the real threat to society", stating that "it's time to take our country back from extreme wealth that has its hands all over the power of the nation". In July 2025, Ruffalo criticized podcaster Joe Rogan on Threads for belatedly opposing ICE raids after having supported Donald Trump's 2024 re-election, writing that "it's a little late now to pretend like Project 2025 didn't exist".

At the 83rd Golden Globe Awards on January 11, 2026, Ruffalo wore a "Be Good" pin on the red carpet in protest of the killing of Renee Good by an ICE agent in Minneapolis. In a red carpet interview, he said the pin was "for the people in the United States who are terrorized and scared today", adding that "I love this country, and what I'm seeing here is not America". Prior to the ceremony, he had written on Instagram: "This week an American citizen was killed by ICE, and as a concerned human, I can't pretend like this is normal." Other celebrities wearing the pins, which were distributed as part of the #BeGood campaign, included Ariana Grande, Jean Smart, Wanda Sykes, and Natasha Lyonne. In February 2026, Ruffalo called for the abolition of ICE on X, writing "Abolish ICE and start over".

=== Historic preservation ===
In 2023, Ruffalo sought to block the sale of the West Park Presbyterian Church, a city landmark built in the 1880s, to prevent its demolition and construction of housing in its place. The congregation said it could not afford the cost of maintaining the deteriorating church building and wanted to use the proceeds of the sale for charity work. He lives in the church neighborhood and has started a campaign to raise money for the building. An independent analysis published in October 2023 found that the church would be very expensive to repair. West-Park temporarily withdrew its application to demolish the church in January 2024. Celebrities and residents had resumed their preservation efforts by 2025, and the New York Court of Appeals ruled in June 2025 that the church's community center, the Center at West Park, could be evicted. Afterward, the Center of West Park asked local lawmakers to intervene, and they were given a final eviction notice that July. Following further community meetings regarding West-Park, Manhattan Community Board 7 voted in October 2025 to recommend against demolition, and the Landmarks Preservation Commission hosted a hearing that December to determine whether the demolition should be approved.

== Acting credits and awards ==
Ruffalo has had a range of credits on screen and stage, including several performances of varying genres—mostly as a supporting actor.

- Emmy Awards — 2 wins
  - 2014 — Outstanding Television Movie — The Normal Heart
  - 2020 — Outstanding Lead Actor in a Limited Series or Movie — I Know This Much Is True

On February 8, 2024, accompanied by his wife Sunrise Coigney and the two elder of his three children, Ruffalo received a star on the Hollywood Walk of Fame.

== See also ==
- List of actors with Academy Award nominations
- List of actors with more than one Academy Award nomination in the acting categories
- List of Golden Globe winners
- List of Primetime Emmy Award winners
