= Vismayathumbathu =

2004 Malayalam film

Vismayathumbathu.
- Promotional poster
- Directed by: Fazil
- Written by: Fazil
- Produced by: Fazil
- Starring: Mohanlal; Mukesh; Nayanthara
- Cinematography: Anandakuttan
- Edited by: K. R. Gaurishankar; T. R. Shekhar
- Music by: Ouseppachan
- Production company: Ammu International
- Distributed by: Century Release
- Release date: 9 April 2004
- Country: India
- Language: Malayalam

Vismayathumbathu (transl. In the tip of wonder) is a 2004 Indian Malayalam-language psychological horror film written, directed and produced by Fazil. It stars Mohanlal, Mukesh, and Nayanthara. Mohanlal plays Sreekumar, who possess sixth sense, while Nayanthara does the role of a wandering spirit who get associated with Sreekumar. The film is based on the novel If Only It Were True (Et si c'était vrai...) by Marc Levy which was also adapted into 2005 American film Just Like Heaven.

== Plot ==
Drawn by an invisible force, Sreekumar meets his school-time friend, Govindan Kutty. That's where he meets with a girl, Rita Mathews, whom he initially mistakes to be a prostitute. Later he discovers that she is the spirit of a Medical College student who had disappeared a while ago. Sreekumar is the only one who is able to see her. Initially, his friends are apprehensive about him, but slowly begin to believe him. Finally, Sreekumar, the spirit and his friends collaborate to unravel the mystery behind the disappeared girl.

== Cast ==
- Mohanlal as Sreekumar
- Mukesh as Govindan Kutty
- Nayanthara as Reetha Mathews
- Harisree Ashokan as Gopan
- Salim Kumar as Koshy
- Nedumudi Venu as Dr. Joseph Sunny
- Cochin Haneefa as C.I. Nandakumar
- K. B. Ganesh Kumar as Dr. Simon Mathew, Reetha's professor
- Kaviyoor Ponnamma as Lathika, Sreekumar's mother
- Sukumari as Hostel Warden
- Rizabawa as V. B. Prathapan
- Kalpana as Maya
- Lakshmi Krishnamoorthy as Sreekumar's grandmother
- T. P. Madhavan as Sivamohan
- Mithra Kurian as Sarala Menon, Reetha's friend
- Abu Salim as Inspector Ravi
- Jijoy Rajagopal as Zachariah Jacob

== Reception ==
Sify wrote: "Stunning! is the word for Fazil's new psychological thriller Vismayathumbathu [...] The film has a solid story, great acting and a surprise climax that not even a jaded critic like yours truly saw coming. Fazil has made it believable; despite the heights you have to take your mind to believe the story premise". Also, "Fazil's control over the medium is outstanding. The meticulous and carefully written screenplay accelerates towards the climax which is absorbing and spell-binding. Only after the film's chilling conclusion will you be able to fit the pieces of this ingenious super natural puzzle together". They conclude by writing: "Vismayathumbathu is an audacious mind game that is simply unmissable." The film despite receiving mixed to positive reviews was a flop at the box office.

== Soundtrack ==
Music: Ouseppachan, Lyrics: Kaithapram Damodaran Namboothiri

- "Priyane Nee Enne" - K. J. Yesudas
- "Etho Kaliyarangin" - Ganga
- "Etho Kaliyarangin" (Extended) - Ganga
- "Etho Kaliyarangin" (Nayika Nee) - Version I - Dr. Fahad Mohammad, Ganga
- "Etho Kaliyarangin" (Nayika Nee) - Version II - Afsal, Ganga
- "Konchi Konchi" - K. J. Yesudas Raga: Kapi (raga)
- "Mizhikalkkinnenthu Velicham" (D) - Vijay Yesudas, Sujatha Mohan
- "Mizhikalkkinnenthu Velicham" (M) - Vijay Yesudas
- "Priyane Nee Enne" - Sujatha Mohan

== Remake ==
Fazil planned to remake the film in Tamil if it was a success. The film was unofficially remade in Tamil as Aavi Kumar (2015).
