= Just like Heaven (2005 film) =

Film by Mark Waters

Just Like Heaven
- Theatrical release poster
- Directed by: Mark Waters
- Screenplay by: Peter Tolan; Leslie Dixon
- Based on: If Only It Were True by Marc Levy
- Produced by: Laurie MacDonald; Walter F. Parkes
- Starring: Reese Witherspoon; Mark Ruffalo
- Cinematography: Daryn Okada
- Edited by: Bruce Green
- Music by: Rolfe Kent
- Production company: Parkes/MacDonald Productions
- Distributed by: DreamWorks Pictures
- Release date: September 16, 2005
- Running time: 95 minutes
- Country: United States
- Language: English
- Budget: $58 million
- Box office: $102.9 million

Just Like Heaven is a 2005 American fantasy romantic comedy film directed by Mark Waters and starring Reese Witherspoon and Mark Ruffalo. It is based on the 1999 French novel If Only It Were True (Et si c'était vrai...) by Marc Levy.

Lonely landscape architect David Abbot finds an amazing San Francisco apartment to sublet, only to find it is inhabited by Elizabeth Masterson, the spirit of the overachieving doctor previous tenant.

Steven Spielberg obtained the rights to produce the film from the book. The film was produced by Parkes/MacDonald Productions and released in the United States by DreamWorks Pictures on September 16, 2005. Despite mixed reviews from critics, it grossed $102.9 million on a budget of $58 million.

== Plot ==
Elizabeth Masterson, a dedicated young San Francisco physician, is in a serious car crash. Three months later, the grieving recent widower David Abbott sublets Elizabeth's apartment.

Elizabeth begins appearing in the apartment, confusing both. She initially believes David is a squatter, and he thinks she broke in. They soon realize Elizabeth can move through walls and objects. She does not know who she is, but insists she is not dead.

David unsuccessfully tries to have Elizabeth's spirit exorcised. As only he can see and hear her, others think he is hallucinating. Elizabeth asks him to help her discover who she really is, so David first talks to neighbours in the building but no one knows her.

David enlists help from psychic bookstore clerk Darryl, who agrees Elizabeth is not truly dead. He says David has a blocked heart and must emotionally release the woman who was in his life. When Elizabeth says he should get over being dumped, he storms out. Darryl, unable to see Elizabeth, tells her not to disrespect the dead. She finds David and he explains about his wife's death.

At a nearby restaurant, Elizabeth talks David through saving a man's life. Suddenly, she remembers being a doctor. They go to the nearest hospital where Elizabeth's memories come flooding back. Dr. Fran Lo, Elizabeth's mentor, takes him to Elizabeth, who is in a coma. When David touches her hand, she feels it, meaning she is still connected to her body.

Elizabeth's sister Abby arrives, and Dr. Brett Rushton – Elizabeth's rival – notifies her that Elizabeth signed a DNR order. When he asks her to sign off on disconnecting Elizabeth's life support, she agrees to consider it.

David and Elizabeth bond. When he takes her to a beautiful landscaped garden he designed, she senses having been there before. In fact, she was dreaming of the garden (in the opening scenes of the film), while catnapping during a long shift.

When David is offered a long-term lease on Elizabeth's apartment, he realizes she will be taken off life support. To prevent it, he goes to Abby and says she is communicating with him. While there, Elizabeth discovers that her niece Lily can see her. David begs Abby to keep her alive, but she has already signed the papers to disconnect her life support the next day. As a last-ditch effort, David blurts out Abby's secret kiss to J.J. on her wedding day, freaking her out so she chases him out.

Elizabeth opts to spend her last night with David in the apartment. The next morning, he is determined to prevent her death by stealing her body from the hospital; he enlists his therapist friend Jack to help. Upon reaching her body, Elizabeth suddenly recognises Jack as Abby's former college boyfriend J.J., who reveals that the two of them had set up David and Elizabeth for a blind date on the night of the crash. David realizes he can see her because they were destined to meet. He admits to Jack and Elizabeth that he loves her.

Security guards catch them trying to steal Elizabeth's body. As they pull Jack away, her breathing tube comes off. Elizabeth is now dying, and David frantically attempt mouth-to-mouth respiration as her spirit fades away. Her heartbeat returns and she awakens. She recognizes Abby, but not David, so he sadly leaves.

Sometime later, Elizabeth moves back into her apartment. Drawn to the roof, she finds David, who has transformed it into a landscaped garden. He reveals he got in with the spare key that her spirit showed him. When Elizabeth asks for it back, their hands touch; her memory of what happened during her coma is restored, and they kiss happily.

The final scene fades away from the rooftop to show Darryl staring into a snow globe, happy with "seeing" how things have turned out.

== Cast ==
- Reese Witherspoon as Elizabeth Masterson
- Mark Ruffalo as David Abbott
- Donal Logue as Jack
- Dina Waters as Abby
- Ben Shenkman as Brett
- Ivana Miličević as Katrina
- Caroline Aaron as Grace
- Rosalind Chao as Dr. Fran Lo
- Ron Canada as Dr. Walsh
- Willie Garson as Maitre D'
- Jon Heder as Darryl

== Reception ==
=== Critical response ===
On the review aggregator website Rotten Tomatoes, 54% of 149 critics' reviews are positive, with an average rating of 5.6/10. The website's consensus reads: "Delightfully sweet like a lollipop, Just Like Heaven is a dreamy romantic comedy that may give you a toothache when it attempts to broach difficult end of life issues by throwing a cherry on top." Metacritic, which uses a weighted average, assigned the film a score of 47 out of 100, based on 31 critics, indicating "mixed or average" reviews.

Roger Ebert, Richard Roeper, and A. O. Scott all gave it favorable reviews, agreeing that the plot had logical flaws that were somewhat overcome by good dialogue and characterization. Gene Shalit on the Today Show called the film "maginficent and extraordinary".

=== Box office ===
Just like Heaven grossed $48.3 million in the United States and Canada, and $54.5 million in other territories, for a worldwide total of $102.9 million, against a budget of $58 million.

== Home media ==
DreamWorks Home Entertainment released Just like Heaven on DVD on February 7, 2006. The DVD release included a number of special features, such as an audio commentary with director Mark Waters, editor Bruce Green, and cinematographer Daryn Okada. Other extras included a gag reel, a collection of deleted scenes with optional commentary, and a featurette titled "Meet the Cast" with interviews from the film's stars. A general "making of" documentary was also included. In Hong Kong, Just like Heaven received a VCD release on February 14, 2006, from local distributor Intercontinental Video. The film's DVD was briefly shown during a scene in the DreamWorks Animation film Flushed Away (2006). The scene depicted several DreamWorks Animation DVDs, alongside Just like Heaven and other live-action DreamWorks DVDs including Mouse Hunt, Old School, Paulie, Red Eye, The Last Castle, The Love Letter and The Peacemaker.

In February 2006, Viacom (now known as Paramount Skydance) acquired the rights to Just like Heaven and all 58 other live-action films DreamWorks had released since 1997, following their $1.6 billion acquisition of the studio's live-action film library and the library of DreamWorks Television. As part of the deal, Viacom/Paramount signed a six-year distribution agreement with DreamWorks Animation, which became its own separate company in October 2004 after splitting off from the live-action divisions of DreamWorks.

Paramount Home Entertainment reissued Just like Heaven on DVD on September 26, 2017, although they have currently never released the film on Blu-ray or 4K Ultra HD. Paramount later added the film to their subscription streaming service Paramount+, which launched in 2021, in addition to making it available on their free streaming service Pluto TV. In Australia, it was also on the streaming service for the Paramount-owned broadcaster Network 10.

== Music ==
=== Theme song and score ===
The title of this film is also that of a popular 1987 song, "Just like Heaven" by The Cure. Singer Katie Melua recorded a cover version of the song for the soundtrack of the film. Melua's version is played over the opening titles and has lines such as "she said" changed to "he said" to maintain a heterosexual narrative. The original version by The Cure, as well as the remainder of Melua's version, are played over the closing credits.

The orchestral score was written by Rolfe Kent, and orchestrated by Tony Blondal.

=== Soundtrack album ===
A soundtrack album for the film was released on September 13, 2005. The album was handled by Columbia Records rather than DreamWorks' own label DreamWorks Records, which had been sold to Universal Music Group in November 2003 for $100 million, and which was shut down around the time Just like Heaven was released. Columbia had also handled the soundtrack for Win a Date with Tad Hamilton! (2004), another DreamWorks film released following UMG's takeover of DreamWorks Records.

==== Album track listing ====
Track No.	Title	Writer and music composer	Performer	Producer	Courtesy (TM/C)	License
01	"Just like Heaven"	Robert Smith, Boris Williams, Simon Gallup, Paul Thompson, and Laurence Tolhurst	Katie Melua	Ralph Sall and Mike Batt	Dramatico Records	
02	"Lust for Life"	David Bowie and Iggy Pop	Kay Hanley	Ralph Sall		
03	"Strange Invitation"	Beck	Beck		Geffen Records	Universal Music Enterprises
04	"Good Times Roll"	Ric Ocasek	The Cars		Elektra Entertainment Group	Warner Music Group (Film & TV)
05	"I Put a Spell on You"	Jay Hawkins	Screamin'; Jay Hawkins		Epic Records	Sony/BMG Music; Entertainment
06	"Just My Imagination (Running Away with Me)"	Barrett Strong and Norman J. Whitfield	Pete Yorn	Ralph Sall	Columbia Records (Pete Yorn appearance)	
07	"Bad Faith" "Fuji Dawn"	Andrew Dorfman			Megathor Music	
08	"Tomorrow" (from the Broadway musical Annie)	Martin Charnin and Charles Strouse	Reese Witherspoon			
09	"Ghostbusters"	Ray Parker Jr.	Bowling for Soup	Ralph Sall and Jaret Reddick	Jive Records (Bowling For Soup appearance)	
10	"Big Brown Eyes"	Ron Hacker	Ron Hacker			
11	"Moonbeam Lullabye"	Daniel May	Daniel May		Marc Ferrari/Matersource	
12	"Jungle Fever"	Bill Ador	The Chakachas		Universal Music S.A. (Belgium)	Universal Music Enterprises
13	"Brass in Pocket"	Chrissie Hynde & James Honeyman-Scott	Kelis	Ralph Sall	LaFace Records/ The Zomba Label; Group (Kelis appearance)	
14	"Swim with Me"	Murray Cook, Jeff Fatt, Anthony Field, Greg Page, and Paul Paddick	The Wiggles		The Wiggles Production PTY Limited	
15	"Bad Case of Lovin' You"	John Martin	Emerson Hart	Ralph Sall		
16	"Spooky"	Buddy Buie, James Cobb, Harry Middlebrooks, and Mike Shapiro	Imogen Heap	Ralph Sall and Imogen Heap	Megaphone Records (Imogen Heap appearance)	Zync Music Inc.
17	"Colors"	Amos Lee	Amos Lee		Blue Note Records	EMI Film and Television Music
18	"Just like Heaven"		The Cure		Elektra Entertainment Group; Warner Music Group; Film & TV Licensing & Fiction Records Limited/ Polydor Ltd. (U.K.)	Universal Music Enterprises

== See also ==
- Always
- Endukante... Premanta!
- Ghost
- Ghost Town
- Soulmates
- Vismayathumbathu
- Bring It On, Ghost
- I See You
