= Vous revoir =

Vous revoir is a 2005 romantic novel by Marc Levy. It is meant to serve as a sequel to his first novel If Only It Were True (Et si c'était vrai...).

== Plot summary ==
When Arthur returns to San Francisco after a self-imposed exile in Paris, he rediscovers his best friend, his job, and the city he loves. The one thing missing is Lauren: the woman he had sacrificed everything to save, only to lose her minutes later. Arthur is resigned to never see Lauren again. But when fate intervenes, it is Lauren’s turn to save Arthur, if she can find him in time.
