= If Only It Were True =

1999 novel by Marc Levy

- First edition cover, as published by Éditions Robert Laffont
- Author: Marc Levy
- Original title: Et si c'était vrai...
- Language: French
- Genre: Romantic fantasy
- Publisher: Robert Laffont
- Publication date: 1999
- Publication place: France
- English publication date: 2000

If Only It Were True (French: Et si c’était vrai...) is the first novel by the French author Marc Levy. It was released in 1999 by Éditions Robert Laffont, and was translated into English the following year. The novel has been adapted into an array of motion pictures, including the 2005 American film Just Like Heaven.

== Plot ==
If Only it Were True is set against the backdrop of San Francisco and tells the story of Lauren Kline, a young, pretty, medical resident, completely devoted to her work in the emergency room of San Francisco Memorial Hospital. She works round-the-clock dealing with patients until she gets into a serious car crash. As a result of the crash, Lauren enters a coma. She "wakes" to awareness outside of her still comatose body and is frustrated to learn that she cannot communicate with anyone. She chooses to spend most of her time in her old apartment, where she is discovered by Arthur, the new tenant. Only he can see, hear, or touch her. After some initial disbelief on his part, Arthur agrees to help Lauren.

== Sequel ==
A sequel to the novel entitled Vous revoir was published in 2005.

== Adaptations ==
The novel has been adapted into several films including the American film Just Like Heaven and the Indian films Vismayathumbathu, Endukante Premanta and I See You.
