= Marc Levy =

French writer (born 1961)

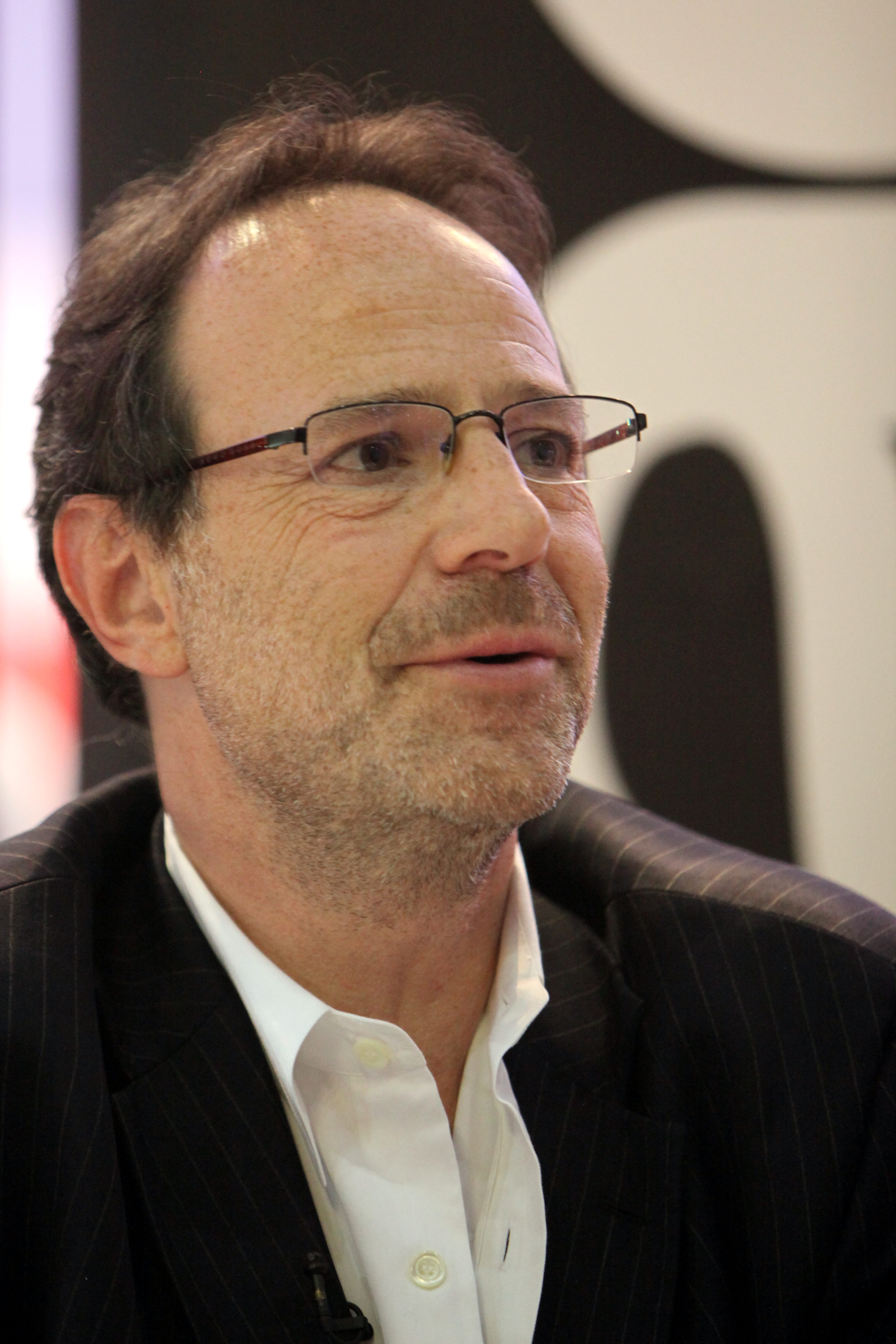
- Marc Levy at the Salon du Livre 2011 in Geneva
- Born: 16 October 1961 (age 65); Boulogne-Billancourt, France
- Occupation: Novelist
- Writing career
- Genre: Novel
- Notable works: If Only It Were True, Vous revoir
- Website: www.marclevy.info

Marc Levy (born 16 October 1961) is a French novelist.

== Career ==
Levy was born in Boulogne-Billancourt, Hauts-de-Seine, and studied management and computers at Paris Dauphine University.

In the late 1990s, Levy wrote a story that his sister, then a screenwriter, encouraged him to send to Editions Robert Laffont, who immediately decided to publish If Only It Were True. Before it was published, Steven Spielberg (DreamWorks) acquired film rights to the novel. The movie, Just like Heaven, produced by Steven Spielberg, and starring Reese Witherspoon and Mark Ruffalo, was a #1 box office hit in America in 2005.

After If Only It Were True, Marc Levy began writing full-time.

Levy was first married at the age of 26; he had a son, the inspiration for If Only It Were True. He is married and lives in New York City.

In 2026, Marc Levy's novel Noa was classified as extremist material in Belarus.

== Bibliography ==
- If Only It Were True, 2000 (adapted for film in 2005)
- Finding You, 2001 (adapted for television in 2007)
- Seven Days for an Eternity, 2003
- In Another Life, 2004
- Vous revoir, 2005 (the sequel to If Only It Were True)
- London Mon Amour, 2006 (adapted for film in 2008)
- Children of Freedom, 2007
- All Those Things We Never Said, 2008.
- The First Day, 2009
- The First Night, 2009 (the sequel to The First Day)
- The Shadow Thief, 2010
- The Strange Journey of Mr. Daldry, 2011
- Replay, 2012
- Stronger than Fear, 2013
- Another Idea of Happiness, 2014
- P.S. from Paris, AmazonCrossing, 2015, trans. Sam Taylor
- The Last of the Stanfields, AmazonCrossing, 2019, trans. Daniel Wasserman
- A Woman Like Her, AmazonCrossing, 2020, trans. Kate Deimling
- Hope, AmazonCrossing, 2021, trans. Hannah Dickens-Doyle

== Filmography ==
- La tortue sur le dos (1978) - Gus, le voyageur
- L'amour dure trois ans (2011) - Himself

Short film

- La Lettre de Nabila directed for Amnesty International, adapted from a short story he co-wrote with Sophie Fontanel.
