= Brian Goodman =

American film and TV director, writer, and actor (born 1963)

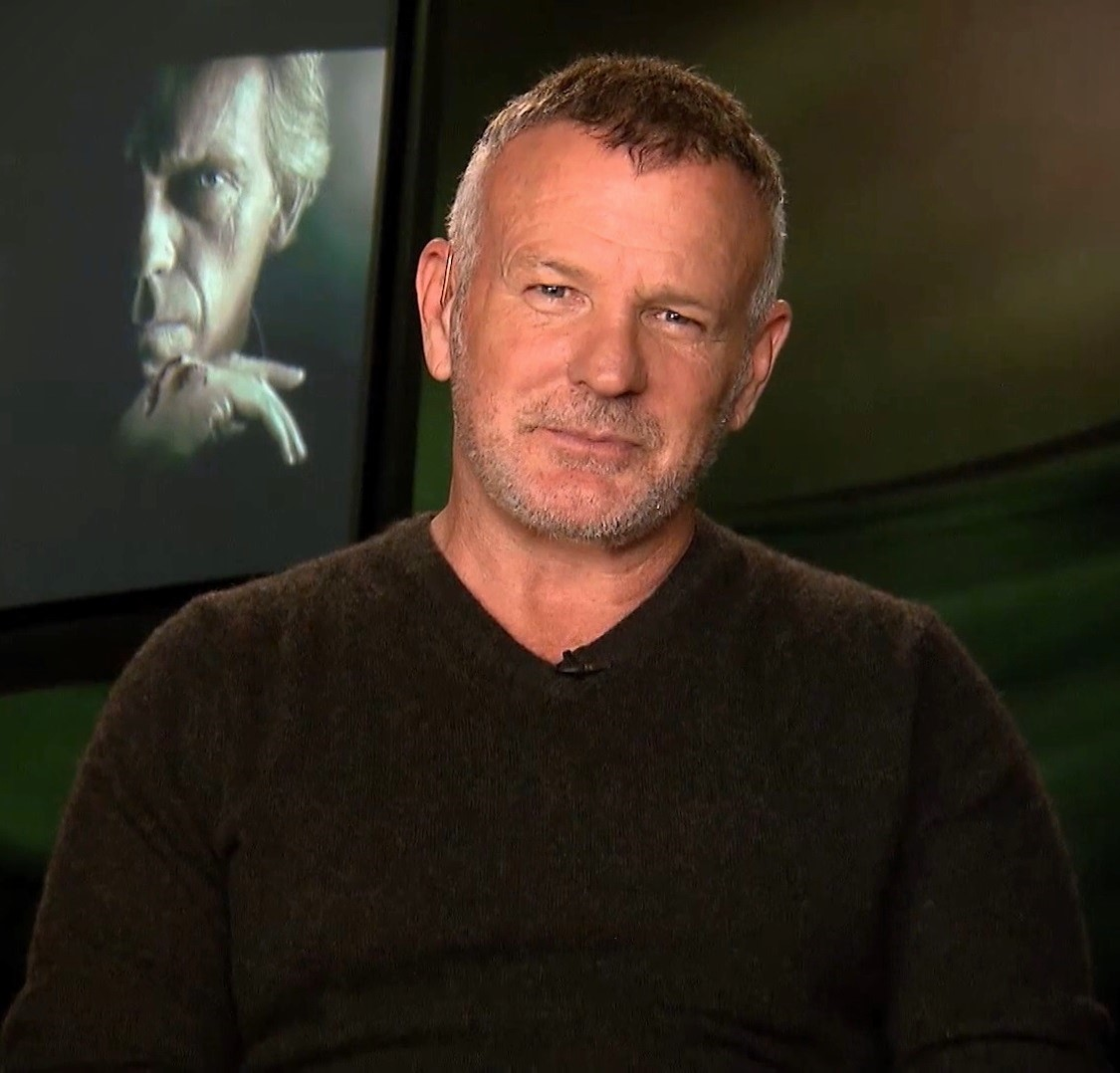
- Goodman in 2017
- Born: June 1, 1963 (age 63); Boston, Massachusetts, U.S.
- Occupations: Film director, television director, writer, actor
- Years active: 1989–present

Brian Goodman (born June 1, 1963) is an American film director, television director, writer, and actor.

== Career ==
Brian Goodman auditioned for, and received, a role in the low-budget film titled Southie with Donnie Wahlberg.

In 2008, Goodman co-wrote and directed the film What Doesn't Kill You. Goodman has also had recurring and guest-starring roles in a number of different films and television series, including all thirteen episodes of Line of Fire (as Donovan Stubbin) and three episodes of Lost as Ryan Pryce.

He also appeared in The Last Castle (2001), Catch Me If You Can (2002), The Fast and the Furious: Tokyo Drift (2006), and two episodes of 24. He was a main cast member in seasons 1 through 4 of Rizzoli & Isles.

== Filmography ==
=== Film ===
Year	Title	Role	Notes
1998	Southie	Monk	
1998	Noose	Gavin	
1999	In Dreams	Policeman in Squad Car	
2000	The Black Rose		
2000	Just One Night	Defendant 2	
2001	The Last Castle	Beaupre	
2001	Scenes of the Crime	Trevor	
2001	Blow	Guard Gus	
2001	Orphan	Uncle Bill	
2002	Catch Me If You Can	Motel Owner	
2002	Bikers of Texas	Isaac Cooper (voice)	Direct-to-video
2005	Munich	Belligerent American	
2006	Annapolis	Bill Huard	
2006	The Dog Problem	Joe the Guard	
2006	The Fast and the Furious: Tokyo Drift	Major Boswell	
2007	Finishing the Game: The Search for a New Bruce Lee	TJ	
2008	What Doesn't Kill You	Pat Kelly	
2009	Mercy	Security Guard	
2010	Sympathy for Delicious	C.O. Jacko	
2011	Sal	Det. Tankersley	
2017	Black Butterfly	Truck Driver / Agent Rothwell	Also Director
2017	The Eradication	Mr. Marcelo	(Short)
2018	Sweet 16	Detective Burns	(Short)
2022	Last Seen Alive	None	Director

=== Television ===
Year	Title	Role	Notes
2001	Thieves	Casino Manager	TV series, 1 episode
2002	Boomtown	Spath	TV series, 1 episode
2003	24	Raymond O'Hara	TV series, 2 episodes
2003–2005	Line of Fire	Donovan Stubbin	TV series, 13 episodes
2004	NYPD Blue	Mickey Cole	TV series, 1 episode
2004	Capital City		(TV movie)
2005	Jack & Bobby	Detective Simmons	TV series, 1 episode
2006	Day Break	Lt. Graves	TV series, 1 episode
2006	CSI: Crime Scene Investigation	Derek Paul	TV series, 1 episode
2006	In Justice	Russell O'Brian	TV series, 1 episode
2007	The Closer	Vince Kemble	TV series, 1 episode
2007	Lost	Ryan Pryce	TV series, 3 episodes
2007	Kings of South Beach	Lt. Jim Hawke	(TV movie)
2007	Eyes	Jimmy Doyle	TV series, 2 episodes
2008	Criminal Minds	Lou Jenkins	TV series, 1 episode
2009	Ronna & Beverly	Ray Natoli	(TV movie), pilot show that was not picked up
2009	Leverage	Jed Rucker	TV series, 1 episode
2010	Bones	Mike Dworsky	TV series, 1 episode
2010	Lie to Me	Dale Anslinger	TV series, episode "Black and White"
2010	Drop Dead Diva	Sergeant Lou Contorsi	TV series, 1 episode
2010	Three Rivers	Capt. Lance Carlyle	TV series, 1 episode
2010	In Plain Sight	Ray Petevich	TV series, 1 episode
2010	CSI: NY	Tony Dirisa	TV series, 1 episode
2010	Justified	Joe	TV series, 1 episode
2010	NCIS: Los Angeles	Damien Salerno	TV series, 1 episode
2010–2014	Rizzoli & Isles	Lieutenant Sean Cavanaugh	TV series, 42 episodes
2011	Sons of Anarchy	Huff	TV series, 1 episode
2011	Castle	Gary McCallister	TV series, 2 episodes
2011	Mortal Kombat: Legacy	Brian Himmerick	Web series, 1 episode
2011	Hawaii Five-0	Commander Sam Hale	TV series, 1 episode
2011–2012	Revenge	Carl Porter	TV series, 4 episodes
2012	Fairly Legal	Lt. Frank O'Hara	TV series, 1 episode
2012–2013	The Mob Doctor	Eddie Nolan	TV series, 2 episodes
2015–2016	Aquarius	Joe Wilson	TV series, 6 episodes
2016–2017	Chance	Detective Kevin Hynes	TV series, 6 episodes
2017	Movie Trivia Schmoedown	Himself	TV series, 1 episode - Jonathan Rhys Meyers Vs Brian Goodman (2017)
2020	I Know This Much Is True	Al	TV series, 1 episode
2023	Fatal Attraction	Arthur Tomlinson	TV series, 8 episodes
2025	Task	Vincent Hawkes	Miniseries
