= Mirror, Mirror III: The Voyeur =

- DVD cover
- Directed by: Rachel Gordon; Virginia Perfili
- Written by: Steve Tymon
- Produced by: Jimmy Lifton
- Starring: Billy Drago; David Naughton; Monique Parent; Mark Ruffalo
- Cinematography: Nils Erickson
- Edited by: Paulette Renee Victor
- Music by: Jimmy Lifton; Marc Mann; Peter Waldman
- Production company: Miranda Entertainment
- Release date: March 5, 1995
- Running time: 91 minutes
- Country: United States
- Language: English

Mirror, Mirror III: The Voyeur is a 1995 American erotic horror film directed by Rachel Gordon and Virginia Perfili, and starring Billy Drago, David Naughton, Monique Parent, and Mark Ruffalo.

The film was released directly-to-video in 1995. Ruffalo, who appeared in the previous installment, Mirror, Mirror II: Raven Dance, appears in an unrelated role in the film.

== Cast ==
- Billy Drago as Anthony
- David Naughton as Detective Kobeck
- Monique Parent as Cassandra
- Mark Ruffalo as Joey
- Richard Cansino as Julio
- Elizabeth Baldwin as Carolyn
- Rudolf Weber as Ramon

== Release ==
Anchor Bay Entertainment released Mirror, Mirror III: The Voyeur on DVD on October 24, 2000. On March 9, 2004, Anchor Bay re-released the film on DVD as part of a four-film set featuring all of the films in the Mirror, Mirror series.

== Reception ==
=== Critical response ===
TV Guide awarded the film one out of four stars, noting: "The only surprise to be had in Mirror, Mirror III is that it took two credited directors to pilot this melange of listless acting, perfunctory horror elements, lengthy but ineffective sex scenes, and amateurish action set pieces."
