= Michael Rezendes =

American journalist

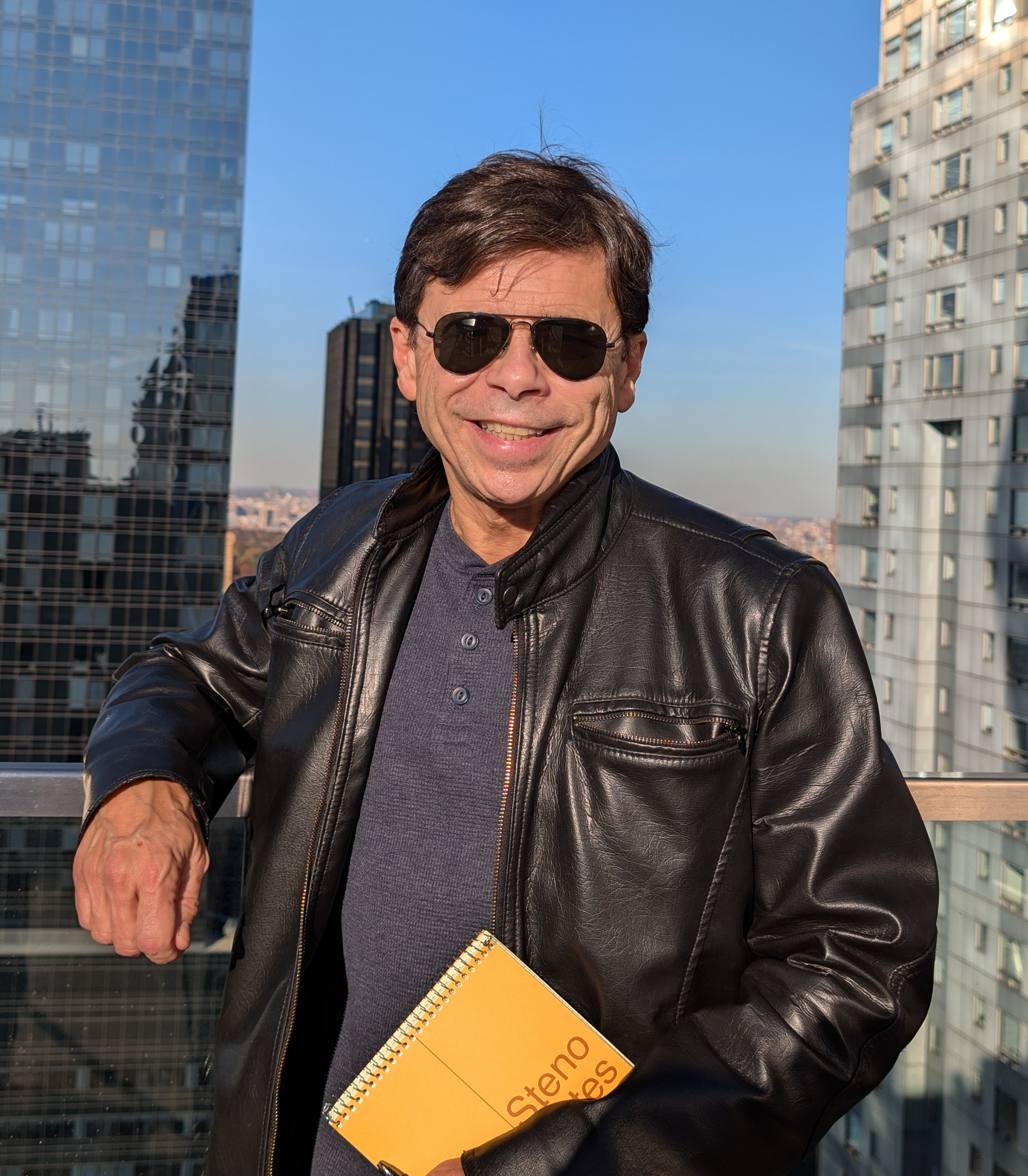
- Education: Boston University (BA); American Film Institute (MFA)
- Employer: The Associated Press
- Known for: Exposing the coverage of the Roman Catholic clergy sexual abuse scandal
- Awards: • Pulitzer Prize • George Polk Award for National Reporting • Goldsmith Prize for Investigative Reporting • Selden Ring Award for Investigative Reporting
- Website: mikerezendes.com

Michael Rezendes is an American journalist who shared a Pulitzer Prize and other awards for his investigative work at The Boston Globe. He also worked as a member of the global investigative team at The Associated Press.

== Personal life and education ==
Rezendes is of Azorean Portuguese descent, born in Maine. He graduated from Boston University with a BA in English and with an MFA from American Film Institute. In 2008 and 2009, he was the recipient of a John S. Knight journalism fellowship at Stanford University.

== Career ==
Before arriving at The Boston Globe, Rezendes was a staff writer at The Washington Post, and a government and politics reporter for the San Jose Mercury News and the Boston Phoenix. He was also a contributing writer at Boston magazine and the editor of the East Boston Community News.

He joined The Boston Globe in 1989, where he covered presidential, state and local politics, and was a weekly essayist, roving national correspondent, city hall bureau chief, and the deputy editor for national news. He moved to The Associated Press in the spring of 2019.

=== Catholic church scandal ===
For more than a decade, Rezendes was a member of the Boston Globe's Spotlight Team, a group of investigative reporters whose work in exposing various Catholic Church sex abuse cases won the newspaper the 2003 Pulitzer Prize for Public Service. For his reporting and writing on the Church, he also shared the George Polk Award for National Reporting, the Goldsmith Prize for Investigative Reporting, the Selden Ring Award for Investigative Reporting, and numerous other honors.

Rezendes's reporting revealed that top Catholic officials covered up the abuses committed by the Rev. John Geoghan, a Boston priest who molested more than 100 children at six parishes over three decades. Rezendes also broke stories about similar cover-ups by Church officials in New York City and Tucson, Arizona.

=== Further investigations as Spotlight member ===
Rezendes and the Spotlight Team were also Pulitzer Prize finalists for a series of stories that uncovered abuses in the debt collection industry. "Debtors Hell" won the Public Service Award from the Society of Professional Journalists and was a finalist for the Goldsmith Prize.

As a Spotlight Team member, Rezendes played a key role in many of the Globe's most significant investigations, including those probing the September 11 attacks on the World Trade Center and the Pentagon, financial corruption in the nation's charitable foundations, and the plight of mentally ill state prisoners. He was also on a team of reporters that won a first-place award from the Education Writers Association for a special section on school desegregation.

=== LDS Church scandal ===
On August 4, 2022, Rezendes published "Seven years of sex abuse: How Mormon officials let it happen," which described how the Church of Jesus Christ of Latter-day Saints (LDS Church) had handled certain sexual abuse allegations received through their help line. The article revealed a number of instances in which LDS Church knew about sexual abuse but did not report it to civil authorities because such communication was claimed by the Church to have been given under clergy privilege under state law. There have been criticisms of Rezendes' article from the LDS Church and church members, including allegations of misrepresentation of evidence found in court cases relied upon in the article. However, the church's official statement did not dispute any facts in Rezendes' story.

=== Alaska Daily ===
In 2022, Rezendes worked as a staff writer in ABC's crime drama Alaska Daily. The show stars Hilary Swank, a journalist who, after fumbling a major story about a U.S. general, leaves New York to work for The Daily Alaskan, a fictional newspaper based on the Anchorage Daily News, in Anchorage, Alaska. The show was inspired by the 2019 Anchorage Daily News and ProPublica article series Lawless: Sexual Violence in Alaska, as well as subsequent related reporting by the project's lead reporter Kyle Hopkins. In May 2023, ABC cancelled the series after one season.

== Books ==
He is a co-author (along with Matt Carroll and Sacha Pfeiffer) of Betrayal: The Crisis in the Catholic Church, and a contributing author to Sin Against the Innocents: Sexual Abuse by Priests and the Role of the Catholic Church.

== In popular culture ==
In the 2015 film Spotlight, he was portrayed by Mark Ruffalo, who was nominated for an Academy Award for Best Supporting Actor for his performance.
