= I Know This Much Is True (miniseries) =

American television miniseries

- Based on: I Know This Much Is True by Wally Lamb
- Written by: Derek Cianfrance; Anya Epstein
- Directed by: Derek Cianfrance
- Starring: Mark Ruffalo; Melissa Leo; John Procaccino; Rob Huebel; Michael Greyeyes; Gabe Fazio; Juliette Lewis; Kathryn Hahn; Rosie O'Donnell; Imogen Poots; Archie Panjabi; Philip Ettinger; Aisling Franciosi; Bruce Greenwood; Marcello Fonte; Harris Yulin
- Narrated by: Mark Ruffalo; Marcello Fonte
- Music by: Harold Budd
- Country of origin: United States
- Original languages: English; Sicilian
- No. of episodes: 6

Production
- Executive producers: Wally Lamb; Anya Epstein; Ben Browning; Glen Basner; Lynette Howell Taylor; Gregg Fienberg; Mark Ruffalo; Derek Cianfrance
- Producer: Jeffrey T. Bernstein
- Cinematography: Jody Lee Lipes
- Editors: Ron Patane; Jim Helton; Malcolm Jamieson; Dean Palisch; Nico Leunen
- Running time: 59–80 minutes
- Production companies: Willi Hill; FilmNation Entertainment; HBO Productions

Original release
- Network: HBO
- Release: May 10 – June 14, 2020

I Know This Much Is True is an American drama television miniseries directed and co-written by Derek Cianfrance, based on the 1998 novel by Wally Lamb. The series stars Mark Ruffalo in a dual role as twin brothers Dominick and Thomas Birdsey. It premiered on HBO on May 10, 2020, and concluded on June 14, 2020, consisting of six episodes. Ruffalo's performance was widely acclaimed and won him a Primetime Emmy Award, a Golden Globe Award, and a Screen Actors Guild Award.

== Plot summary ==
The show takes place in Three Rivers, Connecticut, in the early 1990s. Dominick Birdsey's identical twin, Thomas Birdsey, has paranoid schizophrenia. With medication, Thomas is able to live his life in relative peace and work at a coffee stand, but occasionally, he experiences severe episodes of his illness. Thinking he is making a sacrificial protest that will stop the Gulf War, Thomas cuts off his own hand while at a public library. Dominick sees him through the ensuing decision not to attempt to reattach the hand, and makes efforts on his behalf to free him from what he knows to be an inadequate and depressing hospital for the dangerously mentally ill.

== Cast ==
=== Main ===
- Mark Ruffalo as Dominick and Thomas Birdsey
  - Philip Ettinger as Young Dominick and Thomas Birdsey
- Melissa Leo as Ma, Dominick and Thomas's mother. It is later revealed her full name is Concettina Ipolita Tempesta Birdsey.
- John Procaccino as Ray Birdsey, Dominick and Thomas's stepfather
- Rob Huebel as Leo, Dominick's best friend
- Michael Greyeyes as Ralph Drinkwater, a former classmate from Dominick and Thomas's youth whose life intersects once again with Dominick's
- Juliette Lewis as Nedra Frank, a self-absorbed grad student hired by Dominick
- Kathryn Hahn as Dessa Constantine, Dominick's ex-wife
  - Aisling Franciosi as Young Dessa
- Rosie O'Donnell as Lisa Sheffer, a social worker for unit two at the Hatch Forensic Institute
- Imogen Poots as Joy Hanks, Dominick's live-in girlfriend
- Archie Panjabi as Dr. Patel, Thomas's newly-appointed psychologist
- Bruce Greenwood as Dr. Hume
- Marcello Fonte as Domenico Onofrio Tempesta, Dominick and Thomas's maternal grandfather from Sicily
- Harris Yulin as Father LaVie

=== Recurring ===
- Donnie Masihi as 8-year-old Dominick Birdsey
- Rocco Masihi as 8-year-old Thomas Birdsey
- Joseph Ragno as Henrey Rood
- Laura Esterman as Ruth Rood
- Annie Fitzgerald as Miss Hanker
- Irene Muscara as Prosperine Tucci ("The Monkey"), Ignazia's sister, loathed by Domenico Tempesta.
- Matt Helm as Young Leo
- Agatha Nowicki as Angie Constantine, Dessa's sister
- Tatanka Means as Nabby Drinkwater
- Achakos Johnson as Penny Ann Drinkwater

=== Guest ===
- Guillermo Diaz as Sergeant Mercado ("One")
- Gabe Fazio as Shawn Tudesco, a weightlifter and an insurance adjuster. Fazio also played Dominick and Thomas Birdsey as an off-screen acting partner for scenes where both of them would appear.
- Brian Goodman as Al ("One")
- Joe Grifasi as Steve Falice ("Four")
- Laura Silverman as Kristin ("One")
- Felix Solis as Nurse ("Four")
- Sue Jean Kim as Dr. Yup ("Four")
- Roberta Rigano as Ignazia Tucci Tempesta (Violetta d'Annunzio), Dominick's grandmother from Pescara. ("Five")
- Simone Coppo as Vincenzo Tempesta, youngest brother of Domenico Tempesta. ("Five")
- Zaria Degenhardt as Concettina Tempesta, Dominick and Thomas's mother as a young girl ("Six")

== Episodes ==
Episodes of I Know This Much Is True
No.	Title	Directed by	Written by	Original release date	U.S. viewers (millions)
1	"Episode 1"	Derek Cianfrance	Derek Cianfrance	May 10, 2020	0.323
2	"Episode 2"	Derek Cianfrance	Derek Cianfrance	May 17, 2020	0.313
3	"Episode 3"	Derek Cianfrance	Derek Cianfrance	May 24, 2020	0.314
4	"Episode 4"	Derek Cianfrance	Derek Cianfrance	May 31, 2020	0.391
5	"Episode 5"	Derek Cianfrance	Derek Cianfrance and Anya Epstein	June 7, 2020	0.377
6	"Episode 6"	Derek Cianfrance	Derek Cianfrance and Anya Epstein	June 14, 2020	0.452

== Production ==
=== Development ===
In June 1998, it was announced that 20th Century Fox had acquired film rights to I Know This Much Is True by Wally Lamb, with Clinica Estetico producing, and Jonathan Demme potentially directing. In July 2000, it was announced Matt Damon would star in the film, with Jim Sheridan directing from a screenplay by Richard Friedenberg. In July 2004, it was announced Gina Prince-Bythewood would direct and re-write the film. The film rights expired and reverted to Lamb, who thought the novel would be better adapted into a miniseries rather than a film. Being a fan of Mark Ruffalo's work, Lamb suggested Ruffalo should play the role of the twins. Ruffalo was sent the book and wrote an e-mail to Lamb confessing his love for the novel, stating he definitely wanted to be involved.

Ruffalo had been interested in working with Derek Cianfrance, and reached out to see if Cianfrance would be interested in directing and writing the series. Lamb told Cianfrance and Ruffalo to make the material their own, and did not ask to see the scripts. In October 2017, it was announced HBO would produce and distribute the series, with Ruffalo starring and executive producing, Cianfrance directing, writing and executive-producing alongside Lamb, with FilmNation Entertainment producing the series. In October 2018, the series was greenlit.

Ruffalo first shot all of his scenes as Dominick, requiring him to lose 15 pounds (6.8 kg). After finishing his scenes as Dominick, Ruffalo took a six-week break to gain 30 lb (14 kg) and then shoot his scenes as Thomas. Gabe Fazio worked as a stand-in for both Dominick and Thomas. He is the same height as Ruffalo and lost 30 lb to play Dominick when Ruffalo shot his scenes as Thomas. Production concluded in October 2019.

=== Casting ===
In April 2019, Melissa Leo, Rosie O'Donnell, Archie Panjabi, Imogen Poots, Juliette Lewis and Kathryn Hahn joined the cast of the series. In November 2019, it was announced Aisling Franciosi, John Procaccino, Rob Huebel, Philip Ettinger and Michael Greyeyes had joined the cast of the series.

The members of the Psychiatric Security Review Board in Episode 4 are played by some local officials in Dutchess County, New York, where most of the series was filmed: State Senator Sue Serino, sheriff Butch Anderson, and his wife Danielle, president of the Mid-Hudson Civic Center in Poughkeepsie.

=== Filming ===
Principal photography began in April 2019, in New York's Hudson Valley. On May 9, 2019, a fire erupted on the set of the series at a used car dealership in Ellenville. The building, film equipment and 20 vintage cars were destroyed. There were no injuries but it put filming on hold.

==== Locations ====
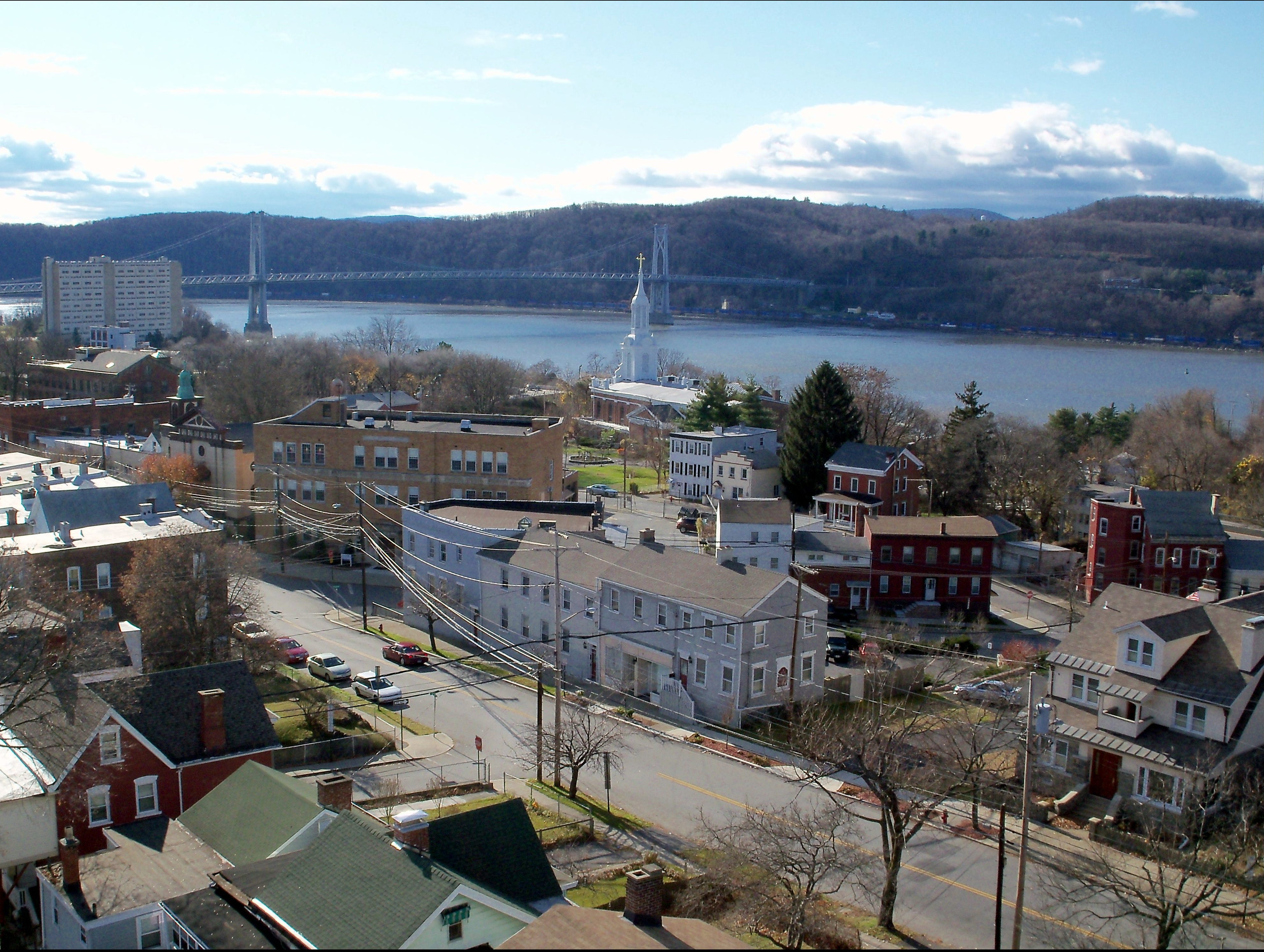
Poughkeepsie cityscape with Mid-Hudson Bridge, similar to view used in series

Poughkeepsie was used for many of the scenes set in Three Rivers, with the Mid-Hudson Bridge visible in the background of the cityscape in most establishing shots. The Birdsey family home is at the corner of Delafield and Hoffman streets. The Vassar College campus is used for scenes set at the University of Connecticut, and Dr. Patel's office is in a strip mall on U.S. Route 9 south of the city. A flashback scene in a later episode required covering Mount Carmel Avenue with dirt to recreate a pre-automotive era. The casino in the closing scenes of the series is the new patient pavilion at Vassar Brothers Hospital, still under construction while it was used in the production.

Elsewhere in Dutchess County, Dominick and Joy's apartment is at Pleasant Valley Estates, and he and Leo play their racquetball match at a Fishkill club; Seasons restaurant in that community was also the location for some scenes. The flashback to 1922 was filmed at the Market Street Industrial Park in Wappingers Falls, where the costumes and sets were stored as well. Many of the mental hospital scenes were filmed at the Taconic Development Disability Services offices in Wassaic.

Across the Hudson River, Thomas's initial breakdown in the opening scene was filmed in the Newburgh library, looking out across the river, and Dominick and Dessa are shown entering the terminal at Stewart International Airport near that city in flashback, where she boards a flight for Europe. In addition to the Ellenville car dealership used for the scenes with Leo, some other locations in Ulster County were used, including Awosting Falls in Minnewaska State Park Preserve on the Shawangunk Ridge west of New Paltz. The Springtown Truss Bridge on the Wallkill Valley Rail Trail across the Wallkill River north of that village, also known for its use in the opening scenes of the 2018 horror film A Quiet Place and its 2021 sequel, was used for the flashback scene where Dominick and Thomas's grandfather throws a bag with a live monkey into the river. A section of U.S. Route 209 outside Kingston also was used for a confrontation between Dominick and Thomas in the first episode; the road was closed for two days in both directions for filming.

== Reception ==
=== Critical response ===
On Rotten Tomatoes, the miniseries holds an approval rating of 74% based on 57 reviews, with an average rating of 7.0/10. The website's critical consensus reads, "I Know This Much is True's relentlessly grim plotting makes it a difficult watch, but the strength of Mark Ruffalo's dual performances is enough to make it a dark tale worth tuning into." On Metacritic, it has a weighted average score of 66 out of 100 based on 29 reviews, indicating "generally favorable reviews".

Writing for The A.V. Club, Ines Bellina rated the series a B−, praising Ruffalo's performance but criticizing it for not being enjoyable to watch and summing it up as "an uneven journey, overwhelming in its self-indulgent trauma... [but] Against all odds, it ends on a more heartfelt and hopeful note than the preceding six hours would lead you to believe."

=== Ratings ===
Viewership and ratings per episode of I Know This Much Is True
No.	Title	Air date	Rating (18–49)	Viewers (millions)	DVR (18–49)	DVR viewers (millions)	Total (18–49)	Total viewers (millions)
1	"Episode 1"	May 10, 2020	0.05	0.323	—N/a	—N/a	—N/a	—N/a
2	"Episode 2"	May 17, 2020	0.06	0.313	—N/a	0.256	—N/a	0.569
3	"Episode 3"	May 24, 2020	0.06	0.314	—N/a	0.264	—N/a	0.578
4	"Episode 4"	May 31, 2020	0.08	0.391	—N/a	0.224	—N/a	0.615
5	"Episode 5"	June 7, 2020	0.04	0.377	—N/a	0.282	—N/a	0.659
6	"Episode 6"	June 14, 2020	0.06	0.452	—N/a	0.246	—N/a	0.698

=== Accolades ===
Year	Award	Category	Nominee(s)	Result	Ref.
2020	Primetime Emmy Awards	Outstanding Lead Actor in a Limited Series or Movie	Mark Ruffalo	Won	
2020	TCA Awards	Individual Achievement in Drama	Mark Ruffalo	Nominated	
2021	Critics' Choice Television Awards	Best Actor in a Limited Series or TV Movie	Mark Ruffalo	Nominated	
2021	Golden Globe Awards	Best Actor – Limited Series or Television Film	Mark Ruffalo	Won	
2021	Satellite Awards	Best Actor in a Miniseries or TV Film	Mark Ruffalo	Nominated	
2021	Screen Actors Guild Awards	Outstanding Performance by a Male Actor in a Television Movie or Limited Series	Mark Ruffalo	Won	
2021	Visual Effects Society Awards	Outstanding Supporting Visual Effects in a Photoreal Episode	Eric Pascarelli, Keith Kolder and Ariel Altman (for Episode 1)	Nominated	

== Controversy ==
In May 2022, both HBO and Mark Ruffalo were sued by residents of Ellenville, New York, for not cleaning up a fire that broke out on the set of a car dealership that was used as a location for the miniseries. The residents claimed that they have suffered physical and emotional injuries and added that the fire caused damage to their homes and exposed them to toxic fumes.
