= The Last Castle =

2001 film directed by Rod Lurie

- Theatrical release poster
- Directed by: Rod Lurie
- Screenplay by: David Scarpa; Graham Yost
- Story by: David Scarpa
- Produced by: Robert Lawrence
- Starring: Robert Redford; James Gandolfini; Mark Ruffalo; Clifton Collins Jr.; Delroy Lindo
- Cinematography: Shelly Johnson
- Edited by: Michael Jablow; Kevin Stitt
- Music by: Jerry Goldsmith
- Production company: Robert Lawrence Productions
- Distributed by: DreamWorks Pictures
- Release date: October 19, 2001
- Running time: 131 minutes
- Country: United States
- Language: English
- Budget: $72 million
- Box office: $27.6 million

The Last Castle is a 2001 American action drama film directed by Rod Lurie, and starring Robert Redford, James Gandolfini, Mark Ruffalo, and Delroy Lindo. The film portrays a struggle between inmates and the warden of a military prison, based on the United States Disciplinary Barracks at Fort Leavenworth.

A highly decorated U.S. Army Lieutenant General, court martialed and sentenced for insubordination, challenges the prison commandant, a colonel, over his treatment of the prisoners. After mobilizing the inmates, the former general leads an uprising aiming to seize control of the prison.

The film was released by DreamWorks Pictures in the United States on October 19, 2001. It received mixed reviews from critics and was a financial disappointment, grossing just $27.6 million against its $72 million budget.

== Plot ==
Lieutenant General Eugene Irwin is sentenced to 10 years in a maximum security military prison for sending his troops on a rescue mission in Burundi, which violated a presidential order and resulted in the deaths of eight soldiers. Prison commandant Colonel Winter admires Irwin, until Irwin calls Winter's prized military artifacts collection something no true battlefield veteran would possess. An offended Winter, who has never seen combat, opposes Irwin's attempt to change the attitudes of the prisoners.

A tenet of Winter's command is that prisoners are no longer soldiers and therefore should not follow military customs and courtesies. On one occasion, Irwin is reprimanded for stopping a guard from clubbing a prisoner, Corporal Ramon Aguilar, who had saluted Irwin in the prison yard.

Irwin attempts to unify the prisoners by building a wall of stone and mortar resembling a medieval castle. Envying the respect Irwin earns, Winter orders his guards to destroy the wall. When Aguilar blocks a bulldozer, Winter orders Corporal Zamorro to fire a rubber bullet directly at Aguilar’s head, killing him.

After the wall is destroyed, Irwin and the inmates pay final respects to Aguilar. Winter offers some small concessions which Irwin rejects as insufficient. Irwin calls Winter a disgrace to the uniform and demands his resignation.

The prisoners begin to behave like soldiers around Irwin, who organizes a plot to have Winter removed by showing his friend Brigadier General Wheeler, who is also Winter's superior, that Winter is unfit. During a visit from Wheeler, Winter receives a letter demanding that he resign, otherwise the prisoners will kidnap Wheeler.

After ordering a response, Winter discovers the letter was a bluff Irwin used to gain intelligence on how the guards would react during an actual uprising. Winter offers to transfer Irwin to another prison but Irwin declines. An infuriated Winter bribes Yates, an asocial prisoner, with a reduced sentence to inform about Irwin's plans. Yates tells Winter that Irwin intends to take over the prison, then raise the flag upside down to signal distress. Yates steals a U.S. flag from Winter's office, revealing he is on Irwin's side. Winter orders the prisoners to the yard in an attempt to prevent their plot, but Irwin anticipated this and an uprising commences. Using improvised weapons and a makeshift trebuchet to bombard Winter's office with stones, the prisoners capture an armored vehicle and the prison helicopter, which Yates uses to kill Zamorro. The prisoners inform Wheeler's headquarters of the riot, and Winter attempts to regain control by ordering the use of live ammunition.

Winter orders the prisoners to surrender or the sharpshooters will fire. Irwin orders them to give up and lie face down. Winter demands Irwin return his flag, saying "It's not your flag", but Irwin instead carries it to the flagpole. Winter again instructs Irwin "You will not raise that flag upside down" and orders the sharpshooters to fire. They refuse, so Winter shoots Irwin in the back. Dying from his wound, Irwin raises the flag. Captain Peretz arrests Winters and the prisoners salute the flag, which Irwin raised right-side-up. The flag flies above the prison's walls as Wheeler arrives. Winter is taken away in handcuffs. The inmates build a new wall as a memorial to their fallen comrades, which includes the names of Aguilar and Irwin.

== Cast ==
- Robert Redford as Lieutenant General Eugene Irwin
- James Gandolfini as Colonel Ed Winter
- Mark Ruffalo as Sam Yates
- Delroy Lindo as Brigadier General Jim Wheeler
- Steve Burton as Captain Peretz
- Paul Calderón as Sergeant Major Dellwo
- Samuel Ball as Duffy
- Jeremy Childs as Cutbush
- Clifton Collins Jr. as Corporal Aguilar
- Brian Goodman as Beaupre
- Michael Irby as Enriquez
- Robin Wright as Rosalie Irwin, the general's daughter (uncredited)
- David Alford as Corporal Zamorro

== Production ==
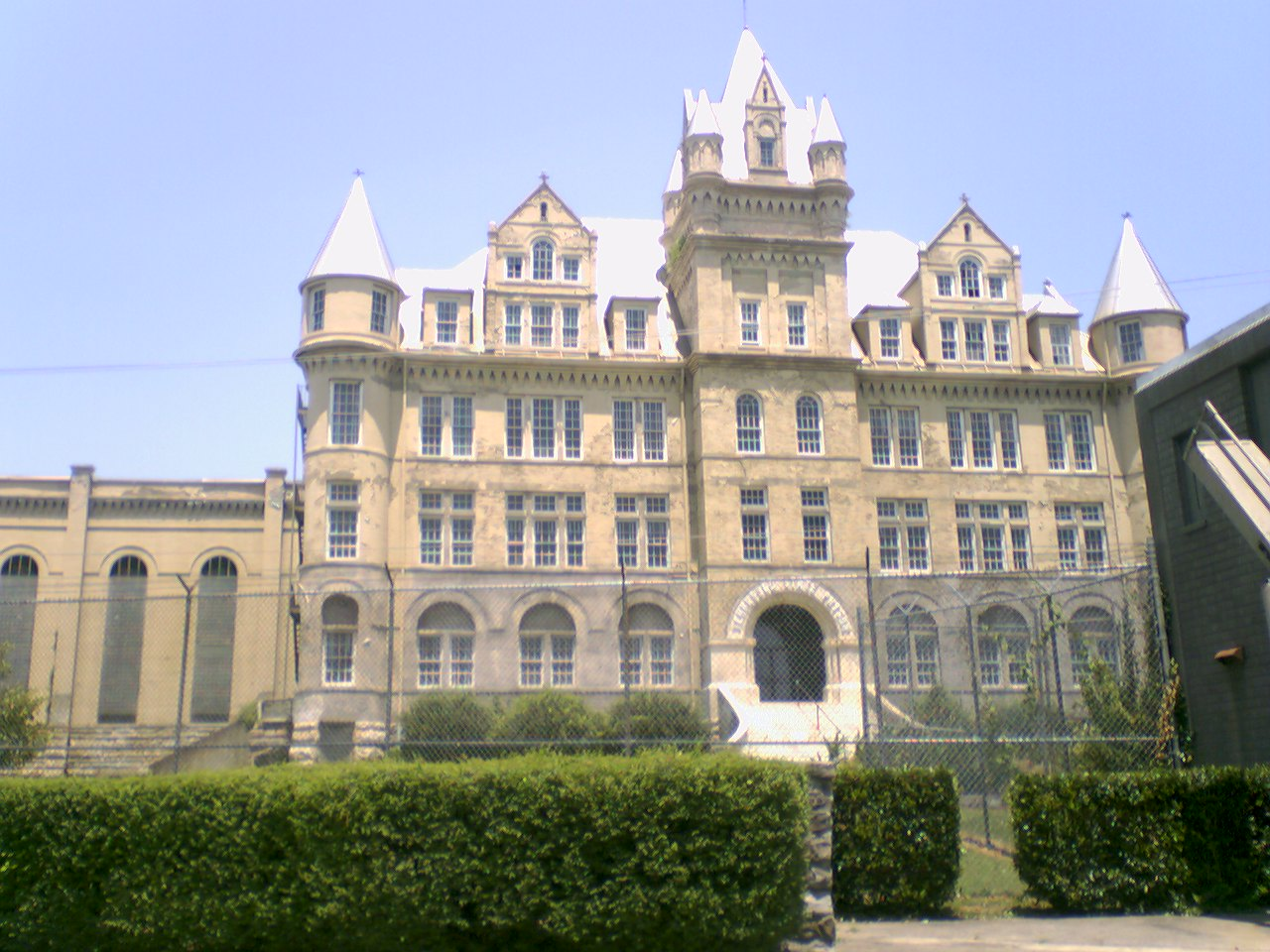
The castle-like appearance of the former Tennessee State Prison

The film was shot mainly at the 103-year-old former Tennessee State Prison in Nashville, which had previously been used for filming in The Green Mile and Last Dance, and was chosen because of its Gothic and castle-like appearance. The state of Tennessee offered to provide the location rent-free, with exemption from the state's 6 percent state sales tax. James Gandolfini earned $5 million for co-starring in the film after finishing the third season of The Sopranos in March 2001.

A crew of 150 worked on refurbishing existing buildings and constructing new buildings in a time limit of nine weeks. A wall 61 metres (200 ft) long and six metres (20 ft) high was built, serving as the prison's entrance. A metal walkway and two towers were also built as vantage points for the guards. The film required an office with a large window through which the warden could watch the inmates; this was constructed by the production crew. Director Rod Lurie insisted on having the prisoners' cells face each other, but this is not the case at the Tennessee State Prison. To solve the problem, production designer Kirk Petruccelli created cells in a warehouse near the prison.

=== Cinematography ===
To show the balance of power, the film crew used multiple cinematography techniques involving different displays of color, lighting, camera and costumes. In the warden's office intense color was used to reflect freedom or power, in contrast to the washed-out colors from the less powerful yard. The contrasts shift as the story progresses, showing the increasing power of the prisoners. The American flag in the yard is described by Petruccelli as "the heart of The Castle" and is the only exemption to the washed-out color palette.

Cinematographer Shelly Johnson, in collaboration with director Lurie and the design team, also used lighting and camerawork to signify the shifting of powers. For example, the yard is at first naturally lit and more influenced by daylight, in contrast to Winter's office, which is artificially illuminated by lamps. As the film progresses, the office is more fully infiltrated by exterior light through a broken window. The shift of power is also emphasized through camera techniques. Hand-held cameras were used when filming in the yard to make the audience feel as if they were "participants in the action". However, a very precise, sterile camera composition was used in the warden's office. The prisoners' world gets more precise during the film, while the colonel's world is filmed more loosely.

Costume designer Ha Nguyen also demonstrates this contrast in the clothing of the cast. The film starts with the prisoners having their clothing divided by ethnicity, with African Americans wearing different headwear, Latinos wearing vests and various arm accessories, and the White Americans in cut-off T-shirts. After the arrival of General Irwin, the prisoners start wearing more similar clothing in a "sharp military manner". The uniforms of the prisoners change from the usual chocolate brown color to light grey, because of its muddled look on film and excessive darkness in some scenes. Ha Nguyen also contrasted the non-battlefield ribbons found on Colonel Winter's uniform with the battlefield medals found on General Irwin's uniform (seen only in the opening scene as Irwin is inducted into the prison).

The wall created by the prisoners in the middle of the yard also represents change and incarnation. What is at first a "discombobulated mess" representing the lack of unity among prisoners later becomes a perfect wall, a "powerful symbol of the results of [Irwin's] leadership".

=== Effects ===
Special effects supervisor Burt Dalton and stunt coordinator Mic Rodger created the battle weapons used in the final scenes. The trebuchet, used by prisoners to throw rocks, was capable of throwing a 68 kilograms (150 lb) rock a distance of 60 metres (200 ft) with an accuracy of ten feet around the target. The water cannon had the power to shoot 76 litres (20 US gal) of water per second. Some of the cast did their own stunts, including Mark Ruffalo, who performed one scene hanging from a helicopter. Interiors of the helicopter were not created with blue screen effects; instead, a special gimbal was used to hold a full-sized Huey-A type military helicopter. The gimbal was capable of rotating the helicopter 360 degrees and vertically moving it 20 feet. The gimbal was controlled by a computer, allowing Dalton to precisely set speed and movement; this ensured precise repeatability for multiple takes.

== Release ==
The original poster that was pulled out of circulation

Prior to release, DreamWorks pulled the original poster from circulation, which depicted an American flag flying upside down (a standard distress call), due to concerns about public sensitivity related to the September 11 attacks.

The film was released on October 19, 2001, in 2,262 North American theaters, grossing $7,088,213 on its opening weekend with an average of $3,133 per theater, ranking in fifth place behind From Hell, Riding in Cars with Boys, Training Day and Bandits. The release spanned 63 days (9 weeks), closing on December 20, 2001, with a total domestic gross of $18,244,060. The film grossed $9,398,647 overseas, with the lowest earning in Egypt ($5,954) and the highest ($1,410,528) in Germany.

== Reception ==
On Rotten Tomatoes, the film has an approval rating of 52% based on 114 reviews, with an average rating of 5.5/10. The website's critical consensus reads, "The Last Castle is well acted and rousing for the most part, but the story cannot stand up to close scrutiny." At Metacritic, a rating website which assigns a normalized rating, the film has a score of 43 out of 100, based on 32 critics, indicating "mixed or average reviews". Audiences polled by CinemaScore gave the film an average grade of "A−" on an A+ to F scale.

Mick LaSalle from the San Francisco Chronicle mentioned the cast, describing Redford as "no George C. Scott" and Gandolfini as an unusual choice to play an icy intellectual. LaSalle stated that "The Last Castle, on the surface, seems like a naive film about a great leader's capacity to inspire", but at closer look "seems to mean one thing but means another upon reflection". Roger Ebert from the Chicago Sun-Times saw it as "a dramatic, involving story" but criticized its "loopholes and lapses." Ebert wrote that Irwin is no less evil than Winter and that they both "delight in manipulating those they can control." He pointed out that the film fails to portray how the prisoners manufacture the weapons and hide them under Winter's observation. Ed Gonzalez of Slant Magazine gave the film a rating of one out of four, saying, "Rod Lurie accomplishes the impossible by churning out a flag-waving action yarn even more ham-fisted than Pearl Harbor."

It received 3 out of 5 stars on IGN; the review noted that though a well paced and well acted film, it "suffers from this overall militaristic, streamlined approach."

Kenneth Turan of the Los Angeles Times said the film's "pretensions lead to a slow, even stately pace, what should be crackling confrontations between Irwin and Winter end up playing more like a tea party than a Wagnerian battle of wills." Owen Gleiberman of Entertainment Weekly gave the movie a "C-plus" grade, writing: "As staged by Lurie, the drama has all the subtlety and surprise of a showdown between the sissy-bully son of Captain Queeg and a hero who's like a fusion of Brubaker, Spartacus, and Norma Rae."

Variety wrote: "Much of the potential dramatic juice has been drained out of The Last Castle, a disappointingly pedestrian prison meller that falls between stools artistically and politically." Claudia Puig of USA Today criticized the writing, citing "a losing battle with an implausible script."

Elvis Mitchell of The New York Times wrote: "The movie is exuberant, strapping and obvious—a problem drama suffering from a steroid overdose."

=== Accolades ===
The Last Castle won the Taurus World Stunt Award for best fire stunt and was nominated for best aerial work and best stunt coordination sequence. Clifton Collins, Jr. was nominated for an ALMA Award in the "Outstanding Supporting Actor in a Motion Picture" category.

== Home media ==
The Last Castle was released on DVD and VHS on March 5, 2002.
