= What Doesn't Kill You (film) =

- Theatrical release poster
- Directed by: Brian Goodman
- Screenplay by: Donnie Wahlberg; Brian Goodman; Paul T. Murray
- Produced by: Marc Frydman; Rod Lurie; Bob Yari
- Starring: Ethan Hawke; Mark Ruffalo; Amanda Peet; Donnie Wahlberg; Angela Featherstone
- Cinematography: Chris Norr
- Edited by: Robert Hoffman
- Music by: Alex Wurman
- Production companies: Battleplan Productions; Bob Yari Productions
- Distributed by: Yari Film Group Releasing
- Release date: December 12, 2008
- Running time: 100 minutes
- Country: United States
- Language: English

What Doesn't Kill You is a 2008 American crime drama loosely based on the true life story of the film's director Brian Goodman, detailing his own exploits involved with South Boston's Irish Mob. Starring Ethan Hawke and Mark Ruffalo, it premiered at the 2008 Toronto International Film Festival, and was released on a very small scale in December 2008 due to the collapse of its distributor Yari Film Group. The title alludes to the Nietzsche quote Was mich nicht umbringt, macht mich stärker (What does not kill me makes me stronger).

== Premise ==
Hawke and Ruffalo play childhood friends Paulie and Brian, who are forced to survive on the tough streets of South Boston through a life of petty thievery. They join a local gang of criminals, but Brian finds it hard to reconcile his work and friendship with Paulie and his relationship with his wife (Amanda Peet) and sons.

== Cast ==
- Mark Ruffalo as Brian Reilly
- Ethan Hawke as Paulie McDougan
- Amanda Peet as Stacy Reilly
- Lenny Clarke as Hogie
- Will Lyman as Sully
- Brian Goodman as Pat Kelly
- Donnie Wahlberg as Detective Moran
- Angela Featherstone as Katie
- Lindsey McKeon as Nicole
- Johnny Serret as Young Brian

== Reception ==
On Rotten Tomatoes the film has an approval rating of 65% based on 34 reviews. On Metacritic the film has a score of 71 out of 100 based on reviews from 10 critics, indicating "generally favorable reviews".
