= The Lofty Pillars =

- Origin: Chicago, Illinois, United States
- Genres: Folk rock, americana
- Years active: 2000–present
- Labels: Atavistic
- Members: Wil Hendricks; Michael Krassner
- Website: www.loftypillars.com

The Lofty Pillars is an American slowcore band from Chicago, Illinois, United States. The band is composed of Wil Hendricks, Michael Krassner; Krassner is known as the founder of the Boxhead Ensemble. The Lofty Pillars have released two studio albums.

== History ==
The Lofty Pillars were formed when Wil Hendricks and Michael Krassner penned the songs for Krassner's 1999 debut album. They had been composing together since 1993 and decided to officially being a musical project together. The Lofty Pillars released their first album When We Were Lost in 2000, although it never came to critical or commercial success. The music was composed as a response to The Ice Storm by Ang Lee.

== Discography ==
- When We Were Lost (2000)
- Amsterdam (2001)
