= The Evening Hour (novel) =

2012 novel by Carter Sickels

- Author: Carter Sickels
- Language: English
- Publisher: Bloomsbury Publishing
- Publication date: January 1, 2012
- Pages: 336
- ISBN: 978-1-608-19597-8

The Evening Hour is a literary fiction novel by American writer Carter Sickels, published by Bloomsbury Publishing in 2012.

== Plot ==
Set in modern-day West Virginia, The Evening Hour looks at life in a small mining town, where residents must often choose between remaining in their homes or selling off their property to mining conglomerates. The novel follows Cole Freeman, who works as an aide in a nursing home and illegally sells prescription medications to support his family.

After 17 years away, Cole's mother, Ruby, returns after being banished by her Pentecostal father for sinful behavior; Cole's father left before he was born. Other influences in Cole's life include his wild and heavily tattooed off-and-on girlfriend, Charlotte, and his childhood friend, Terry Rose, who aims to cook meth.

Meanwhile, Cole imagines settling down into a better life with Lacy, who works as a waitress at a local restaurant.

== Themes ==
The Evening Hour explores themes relating to environmentalism, as well as gender and masculinity.

== Reception ==
The Evening Hour was well received by critics.

Diane T. Masucci, writing for The Brooklyn Rail, discussed how the novel shows the reader the impacts coal mining in a compelling way, writing, "Sickels thinks hard about the things that many of us take for granted, dramatizing these issues in a compelling mystery that examines the effects of strip mining on the land and the individual".

Speaking to the overall narrative, Publishers Weekly found that "despite moments of heavy-handed foreshadowing and repetitive conversations, the novel is grounded in rich storytelling."

Reviewers often praised Sickels for how he handled the characters in the novel. As Kirkus Reviews wrote, Sickels "refreshingly presents them as fully realized characters rather than as clichés or stereotypes." Speaking directly of the novel's protagonist, Publishers Weekly added, "Even at his worst, Cole proves well-intentioned and likable, with deep caring for others that proves refreshing, particularly when disaster strikes."

The Evening Hour was selected by the Southern Independent Booksellers Alliance (SIBA) for its 2011 Spring Okra Picks. In 2013, it was a finalist for the Lambda Literary Award for LGBT Debut Fiction, Edmund White Award, and Oregon Book Award.

== Adaptation ==
The Evening Hour was adapted into a film of the same name, premiering at the 2020 Sundance Film Festival. The film is directed by Braden King and features Philip Ettinger, Marc Menchaca, Cosmo Jarvis, Stacy Martin, Kerry Bishé, and Lili Taylor. In 2020, it was nominated for the Big Screen Award at International Film Festival Rotterdam, the Grand Jury Prize in the US Drama competition at the Sundance Film Festival, and the Prize of the City of Torino at the Torino Film Festival.
