= Carter Sickels =

American author and educator (born 1970s)

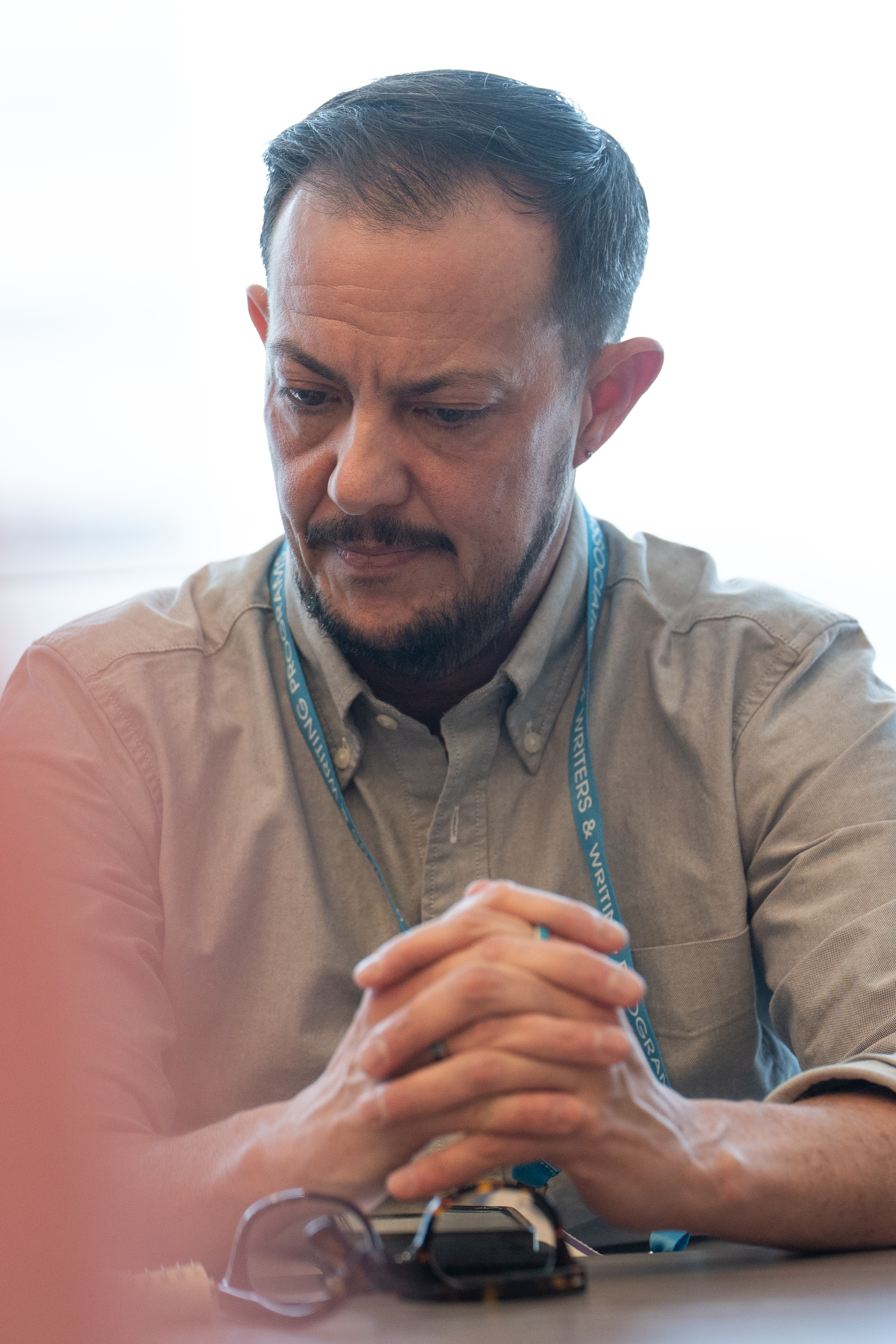
- Sickels in 2026
- Occupations: Author and educator
- Writing career
- Genre: Literary fiction
- Notable awards: Betty Berzon Emerging Writer Award (2013); Southern Book Prize (2020); Jim Duggins Outstanding Mid-Career Novelists' Prize (2025)
- Website: cartersickels.com

Carter Sickels (born 1970s) is an American author and educator. He is the author of The Evening Hour (2012) and The Prettiest Star (2020), as well as the editor of Untangling the Knot (2015). Among other honors, he won the 2013 Betty Berzon Emerging Writer Award, the 2020 Southern Book Prize, and the 2025 Jim Duggins Outstanding Mid-Career Novelists' Prize.

== Early life and education ==
Sickels was born in the 1970s and grew up in a small town in Central Ohio in the 1980s. He earned a Master of Fine Arts from Pennsylvania State University and a Master of Arts in folklore from the University of North Carolina at Chapel Hill.

== Career ==
Sickels's debut novel, The Evening Hour, is a literary fiction novel published by Bloomsbury Publishing in January 2012. The Evening Hour was adapted into a film of the same name, premiering at the 2020 Sundance Film Festival. The film is directed by Braden King and features Philip Ettinger, Marc Menchaca, Cosmo Jarvis, Stacy Martin, Kerry Bishé, and Lili Taylor. In 2020, it was nominated for the Big Screen Award at International Film Festival Rotterdam, the Grand Jury Prize in the US Drama competition at the Sundance Film Festival, and the Prize of the City of Torino at the Torino Film Festival.

In 2015, Ooligan Press published Untangling the Knot: Queer Voices on Marriage, Relationships and Identity, an anthology about marriage equality, which Sickels edited. In 2016, the American Library Association included Untangling the Knot on their annual Over the Rainbow book list.

Sickels's most accomplished book, The Prettiest Star, is a literary fiction novel published by Hub City Press in April 2020. Set at the beginning of the AIDS epidemic in the United States, the novel centers Brian Jackson who, after his lover dies from AIDS, returns to the family who rejected him in a small town in Ohio. The novel is written from multiple perspectives.

Beyond writing, Sickels has taught at Eastern Kentucky University and the Gotham Writers' Workshop. As of 2025, he was an associate professor of English at North Carolina State University.

== Personal life ==
Sickels is queer and transgender. He came out as gay while in college, then later came out as transgender around the time The Evening Hour was published.

== Awards and honors ==
As a writer, Sickels won the 2013 Betty Berzon Emerging Writer Award, an early career prize for LGBTQ writers, later followed by the 2025 Jim Duggins Outstanding Mid-Career Novelists' Prize, a mid-career writing prize from the Lambda Literary Foundation. That same year, he was a finalist for the Dos Passos Prize, a literary award for "America's most talented but underappreciated writers". He has received writing residencies from MacDowell (2004, 2006, 2024) and Good Hart Artist Residency (2022).

The Evening Hour was selected by the Southern Independent Booksellers Alliance (SIBA) for its 2011 Spring Okra Picks.

The Prettiest Star was selected for SIBA's 2020 Spring Okra Picks. That year, Kirkus Reviews named it one of the best adult novels of the year, and Oprah Daily included it on their list of the year's best LGBTQ books. The following year, the American Library Association also included it as a top ten book on their Over the Rainbow book list.

Awards for Sickels's work
Year	Title	Award	Result	Ref.
2013	The Evening Hour	Lambda Literary Award for LGBT Debut Fiction	Finalist	
2013	The Evening Hour	Edmund White Award	Finalist	
2013	The Evening Hour	Oregon Book Award	Finalist	
2020	The Prettiest Star	Weatherford Award for Fiction	Winner	
2021	The Prettiest Star	Southern Book Prize for Fiction	Winner	
2021	The Prettiest Star	Ohioana Book Award for Fiction	Winner	
2025	—	Lambda Literary Award, Duggins Prize (Special Award)	Winner	

== Publications ==
=== Books ===
- Sickels, Carter (2013). The Evening Hour. Bloomsbury. ISBN 978-1-608-19597-8.
- Sickels, Carter, ed. (2015). Untangling the Knot: Queer Voices on Marriage, Relationships and Identity. Ooligan Press. ISBN 978-1-932-01075-6.
- Sickels, Carter (2020). The Prettiest Star. Hub City Press. ISBN 978-1-93823-562-7.

=== Book chapters ===
- Sickels, Carter (2012). "Saving". In Leger, Tom; MacLeod, Riley (eds.). The Collection: Short Fiction from the Transgender Vanguard. Topside Press. ISBN 978-0-983-24220-8.
- Ricketts, Wendel, ed. (2014). Blue, Too: More Writing by (for or about) Working-Class Queers. FourCats Press. ISBN 978-0-989-98001-2.
- Sickels, Carter (2014). "Carter Sickels: Dear Teenage Me". In Moon, Sarah (ed.). The Letter Q: Queer Writers' Notes to Their Younger Selves. Arthur A. Levine Books. ISBN 978-0-545-39933-3.
- Sickels, Carters (2015). "Bittersweet: On Transitioning and Finding Home". In Blevins, Adrian; McElmurray, Karen Salyer (eds.). Walk Till the Dogs Get Mean : Meditations on the Forbidden From Contemporary Appalachia. Ohio University Press. pp. 73–79. ISBN 978-0-821-42167-3.
- Berman, Steve, ed. (2016). Best Gay Stories 2016. Lethe Press. ISBN 978-1-590-21588-3.
- Sickels, Carter (2019). "Saving". In Mann, Jeff; Watts, Julia (eds.). LGBTQ Fiction and Poetry from Appalachia. West Virginia University Press. pp. 210–236. ISBN 978-1-946-68492-9.
- Sickels, Carter (2024). "Troublesome Rising". In Helton, Melissa (ed.). Troublesome Rising: A Thousand-Year Flood in Eastern Kentucky. Fireside Industries. pp. 79–84. ISBN 978-1-950-56442-2.
