= When We Were Lost =

Studio album by The Lofty Pillars
- Released: July 18, 2000
- Recorded: Truckstop Audio Recording Company, Chicago, IL
- Genre: Folk rock, americana
- Length: 44:00
- Label: Atavistic
- Producer: Michael Krassner

The Lofty Pillars chronology
When We Were Lost (2000)	Amsterdam (2001)

Professional ratings
Review scores
Source	Rating
Pitchfork Media	(6.5/10)

When We Were Lost is the debut album of The Lofty Pillars, released on July 18, 2000, through Atavistic Records.

== Track listing ==
All tracks are written by Wil Hendricks and Michael Krassner.

No.	Title	Length
1.	"Lost"	3:19
2.	"At the Station"	4:42
3.	"Anna Lee"	5:22
4.	"Prodigal Son"	2:27
5.	"Still Life"	4:24
6.	"Snow"	2:14
7.	"Response"	5:03
8.	"Someone"	4:32
9.	"I Have Become You"	2:43
10.	"Snow"	3:18
11.	"Victim"	4:57

== Personnel ==
The Lofty Pillars

- Gerald Dowd – drums, vocals
- Joe Ferguson – vocals, engineering, mixing
- Ryan Hembrey – bass guitar
- Wil Hendricks – accordion, piano, vocals
- Charles Kim – electric guitar
- Glenn Kotche – drums
- Michael Krassner – singing, guitar, production, mixing
- Nate Lepine – reeds
- Fred Lonberg-Holm – cello, nyckelharpa, arrangement
- Julie Pomerleau – violin

Production and additional personnel

- Pierre Hambur – painting
- David Pavkovic – mastering
