= Dutch Harbor – Where the Sea Breaks Its Back =

Soundtrack album by Boxhead Ensemble
- Released: March 11, 1997
- Recorded: July 10, 1996 at Truckstop Audio Recording Company, Chicago, IL
- Genre: Post-rock
- Length: 69:54
- Label: Atavistic

Boxhead Ensemble chronology
| Dutch Harbor – Where the Sea Breaks Its Back (1997) | The Last Place to Go (1998) |

Professional ratings
Review scores
| Source | Rating |
|---|---|
| Allmusic | 3/5 stars |

Dutch Harbor – Where the Sea Breaks Its Back is an album by post-rock/ambient musical collective Boxhead Ensemble, released on March 11, 1997 through Atavistic Records. It consists of an alternative live soundtrack for the 1998 documentary film Dutch Harbor.

== Track listing ==
| No. | Title | Writer(s) | Length |
|---|---|---|---|
| 1. | "Introduction" | | 5:01 |
| 2. | "Unalaska Island" | | 1:16 |
| 3. | "For the Glory of the Wind and the Water" | | 4:03 |
| 4. | "Ship Supply" | | 9:44 |
| 5. | "Telegraph Hill" | | 4:12 |
| 6. | "The Ravens" | | 8:08 |
| 7. | "Mother Gromoff" | | 1:19 |
| 8. | "Captain's Bay Road" | | 4:33 |
| 9. | "At Sea" | | 13:06 |
| 10. | "The Valley" | | 10:19 |
| 11. | "Ebb's Folly" | Will Oldham | 4:53 |
| 12. | "In Closing" | | 3:20 |

== Personnel ==
Musicians

- Joe Ferguson – guitar (10, 12)
- David Grubbs – guitar (6, 9, 10, 12)
- Charles Kim – guitar (1–3, 9, 10, 12), violin (4, 10), piano (12)
- Michael Krassner – musical direction, guitar (4, 10), piano (5), mixing, mastering
- Doug McCombs – bass guitar (6, 10, 12)
- Mother Gromoff – voice (7)
- Jim O'Rourke – guitar (1, 3, 4, 6, 8, 11)
- Will Oldham – vocals (11), guitar (11)
- Rick Rizzo – guitar (6)
- Buck Rogers – voice (12)
- Ken Vandermark – reeds (1, 3, 4, 6)
- David Williams – voice (3)

Production and additional personnel

- Braden King – engineering, mixing, mastering, tape (4)
