= The Last Place to Go =

Live album by Boxhead Ensemble
- Released: October 20, 1998
- Recorded: November 11, 1997–November 29, 1997
- Genre: Post-rock
- Length: 59:40
- Label: Atavistic

Boxhead Ensemble chronology
Dutch Harbor - Where the Sea Breaks Its Back (1997)	The Last Place to Go (1998)	Niagara Falls (1999)

Professional ratings
Review scores
Source	Rating
Allmusic	4/5 stars
Pitchfork Media	(8.5/10)

The Last Place to Go is a live album by Boxhead Ensemble, released on October 20, 1998 through Atavistic Records.

== Track listing ==
No.	Title	Length
1.	"Introduction"	2:37
2.	"Coastal Boarder"	5:47
3.	"Nobody"	7:46
4.	"Dust and Rain"	4:49
5.	"Fading Cold"	3:24
6.	"Two Ravens"	2:56
7.	"Carolyn's Theme"	2:31
8.	"The Last Place to Go"	6:39
9.	"Choices Made"	6:07
10.	"Deep Sea"	0:52
11.	"Medley" (Far Gone/Big Sky)	16:12

== Personnel ==
Musicians

- Edith Frost – vocals (9)
- Ryan Hembrey – bass guitar (4–8)
- Charles Kim – bowed guitar, steel guitar and violin (1–3, 10, 11)
- Michael Krassner – musical direction, guitar, keyboards and melodica (2–5, 7–10), mixing, recording
- Fred Lonberg-Holm – cello (1–3, 10, 11)
- Will Oldham – guitar and melodica (1, 2, 11)
- Julie Pomerleau – violin (4–6, 8)
- Carolyn Reed – vocals (7)
- Scott Tuma – guitar (2–5, 7–9)
- Mick Turner – guitar and melodica (1, 2, 11)
- Jim White – drums and percussion (2–11)

Production and additional personnel

- Jan Hiddink – production (1, 2)
- Berry Kamer – production (1, 2)
- Braden King – mixing, recording
