= Amsterdam (The Lofty Pillars album) =

Studio album by The Lofty Pillars
- Released: September 18, 2001
- Recorded: Winter 2001 at Truckstop Audio Recording Company, Chicago, IL
- Genre: Folk rock, americana
- Length: 62:55
- Label: Atavistic
- Producer: Joe Ferguson, Michael Krassner

The Lofty Pillars chronology
When We Were Lost (2000)	Amsterdam (2001)

Professional ratings
Review scores
Source	Rating
Allmusic	4/5 stars

Amsterdam is the second album by The Lofty Pillars, released on September 18, 2001, through Atavistic Records.

== Track listing ==
All tracks are written by Wil Hendricks and Michael Krassner, except "Fade Away" co-written with Fred Lonberg-Holm.

No.	Title	Length
1.	"Amsterdam"	4:25
2.	"Roll Down"	3:10
3.	"Guest of Dishonour"	2:49
4.	"Fade Away"	4:46
5.	"Sons of Solemn Men"	3:17
6.	"Eulogy"	3:34
7.	"Field of Honour"	7:13
8.	"Mothers of Arms"	3:51
9.	"Three Men"	6:35
10.	"Wasted"	2:25
11.	"Down the River"	7:28
12.	"Farewell Song"	3:37
13.	"Longing"	5:52
14.	"Underworld"	3:53

== Personnel ==
The Lofty Pillars

- Joe Ferguson – production, recording, mixing, backing vocals (11)
- Wil Hendricks – lead vocals (2, 4, 6, 8, 10, 12, 14), piano (1–6, 8–14), organ (5, 8, 10), bass guitar (1, 5, 6, 8, 9, 11–14), acoustic bass (3), twelve-string acoustic guitar (7), acoustic guitar (2, 7), backing vocals (1, 3, 5, 9, 11, 13)
- Michael Krassner – lead vocals (1, 3, 5, 7, 9, 11, 13), acoustic guitar (3, 5, 7–9, 11–14), electric guitar (4), bass guitar (2), backing vocals (12, 14), production, recording, mixing
- Fred Lonberg-Holm – cello (1–6, 8, 9, 13, 14), arrangements

Additional musicians and personnel

- Jason Adasiewicz – drums (4)
- Jessica Billey – violin (1, 4, 6, 9, 13, 14)
- Kyle Bruckmann – Cor anglais (2, 4, 5, 13, 14), oboe (14)
- Steve Dorocke – pedal steel guitar (7, 11, 12)
- Gerald Dowd – drums (1, 2, 9, 11, 12, 14)
- Mike Hagler – mastering
- Ryan Hembrey – bass guitar (4, 7)
- Glenn Kotche – drums (7), percussion (5)
- Jen Paulsen – viola (1–6, 9, 13, 14), violin (5)
- Matt Schneider – electric guitar (1, 6, 11, 12), acoustic guitar (1)
