= Two Brothers (album) =

Studio album by Boxhead Ensemble
- Released: August 21, 2001
- Recorded: Truckstop Audio Recording Company, Chicago, IL
- Genre: Chamber, post-rock
- Length: 63:00
- Label: Atavistic

Boxhead Ensemble chronology
| Niagara Falls (1999) | Two Brothers (2001) | Quartets (2003) |

Professional ratings
Review scores
| Source | Rating |
|---|---|
| AllMusic | 4.5/5 stars |
| Pitchfork Media | (8.9/10) |

Two Brothers is the debut studio album of Boxhead Ensemble, released on August 21, 2001 through Atavistic Records.

== Track listing ==
| No. | Title | Length |
|---|---|---|
| 1. | "Still" | 2:10 |
| 2. | "From This Point Onward" | 10:55 |
| 3. | "When Johnny Comes Marching Home" | 3:37 |
| 4. | "Two Brothers" | 18:14 |
| 5. | "The Half-Light" | 4:01 |
| 6. | "Requiem" | 9:48 |
| 7. | "Sba?" | 3:27 |
| 8. | "Come Again No More" | 9:44 |
| 9. | "Epilogue" | 1:04 |

== Personnel ==
Boxhead Ensemble

- Jessica Billey – violin
- Ryan Hembrey – bass guitar
- Glenn Kotche – drums
- Michael Krassner – musical direction, mixing
- Fred Lonberg-Holm – cello, nyckelharpa
- Scott Tuma – guitar

Production and additional personnel

- David Michael Curry – viola
- Steve Dorocke – guitar
- Gerald Dowd – drums
- Joe Ferguson – engineering
- Guillermo Gregorio – reeds
- Mike Hagler – mastering
- Braden King – design
- Jeff Parker – guitar
- Andrew Sopko – cover art
- Mick Turner – guitar
- Jeff Tweedy – guitar
- Jim White – drums
