= Quartets (Boxhead Ensemble album) =

Studio album by Boxhead Ensemble
- Released: October 7, 2003
- Recorded: Truckstop Audio Recording Company, Chicago, IL
- Genre: Ambient, chamber music
- Length: 42:32
- Label: Atavistic

Boxhead Ensemble chronology
Two Brothers (2001)	Quartets (2003)	Nocturnes (2006)

Professional ratings
Review scores
Source	Rating
Allmusic	4.5/5 stars
Mojo	5/5 stars

Quartets is the second album by Boxhead Ensemble, released on October 7, 2003 through Atavistic Records.

== Track listing ==
No.	Title	Length
1.	"One"	5:24
2.	"Two"	3:44
3.	"Three"	4:09
4.	"Four"	12:06
5.	"Five"	8:57
6.	"Six"	6:43
7.	"Seven"	1:29

== Personnel ==
Boxhead Ensemble

- Jessica Billey – violin
- Michael Colligan – reeds
- Ryan Hembrey – bass guitar
- Glenn Kotche – drums
- Michael Krassner – musical direction, mixing
- Fred Lonberg-Holm – cello
- Scott Tuma – guitar
