= Michael Krassner (album) =

Studio album by Michael Krassner
- Released: May 18, 1999
- Recorded: Truckstop Audio Recording Company, Chicago, IL
- Genre: Folk rock
- Length: 38:08
- Label: Atavistic
- Producer: Joe Ferguson, Michael Krassner

Professional ratings
Review scores
Source	Rating
Allmusic	4/5 stars
Pitchfork Media	(5.7/10)

Michael Krassner is the eponymously titled debut solo album of composer Michael Krassner, released on May 18, 1999, through Atavistic Records.

== Track listing ==
All tracks are written by Wil Hendricks and Michael Krassner

No.	Title	Length
1.	"This Time"	5:11
2.	"Water Lets the Life In"	2:51
3.	"You're Such a Fool"	4:27
4.	"Glass in Garden"	2:34
5.	"Atcnement Song"	2:44
6.	"Remedios the Beauty"	3:16
7.	"Maybellene"	4:53
8.	"Business of Death"	3:15
9.	"To Lose Is to Gain"	4:19
10.	"Dawn"	4:33

== Personnel ==
Musicians

- Jim Becker – instruments
- Jessica Billey – instruments
- Gerald Dowd – instruments
- Joe Ferguson – instruments, production, engineering, mixing
- Ryan Hembrey – instruments
- Wil Hendricks – instruments
- Charles Kim – instruments
- Glenn Kotche – drums, percussion
- Michael Krassner – instruments, production, engineering, mixing
- Fred Lonberg-Holm – cello, arrangement
- Ernst Long – instruments
- Steve Poulton – instruments

Production and additional personnel

- Mike Hagler – mastering
- Pierre Hambur – painting
- Braden King – photography, design
