= Flubber =

Flubber may refer to:

- "Flying rubber", a fictional material in the 1961 Disney film The Absent-Minded Professor
  - Son of Flubber, a 1963 sequel to The Absent-Minded Professor
  - Flubber (film), a 1997 remake of The Absent-Minded Professor
- Flubber (material), a visco-elastic material often used in children's science projects
- Flubber, a Xavier Institute student in the fictional Marvel Comics universe
- Flubber (album), a 1989 album by Souled American
- Flubber (comics), a fictional character
