= The Evening Hour (film) =

- Theatrical release poster
- Directed by: Braden King
- Screenplay by: Elizabeth Palmore
- Based on: The Evening Hour by Carter Sickels
- Produced by: Lucas Joaquin; Braden King; Derrick Tseng
- Starring: Philip Ettinger; Stacy Martin; Cosmo Jarvis; Michael Trotter; Kerry Bishé; Lili Taylor
- Cinematography: Declan Quinn
- Edited by: Andrew Hafitz; Joseph Krings
- Music by: Boxhead Ensemble
- Production companies: Secret Engine; Washington Square Films
- Distributed by: Strand Releasing
- Release dates: January 27, 2020 (Sundance); July 30, 2021 (United States)
- Running time: 115 minutes
- Country: United States
- Language: English

The Evening Hour is a 2020 American drama film, directed by Braden King from a screenplay by Elizabeth Palmore. It is based upon the 2012 novel of the same name by Carter Sickels. It stars Philip Ettinger, Stacy Martin, Cosmo Jarvis, Michael Trotter, Kerry Bishé and Lili Taylor.

It had its world premiere at the Sundance Film Festival on January 27, 2020. It was released on July 30, 2021 by Strand Releasing.

== Plot ==
Cole works as a nursing aide at an elderly care facility in rural Appalachia. As a side job, he redistributes excess medication from residents to local buyers. Cole sees himself as a caretaker who keeps addicts out of the path of the town's drug kingpin. His double life becomes suddenly threatened when a childhood friend returns after years away with plans to follow Cole into the local drug trade.

== Cast ==
- Philip Ettinger as Cole Freeman
- Stacy Martin as Charlotte Carson
- Cosmo Jarvis as Terry Rose
- Michael Trotter as Reese Campbell
- Kerry Bishé as Lacy Cooper
- Lili Taylor as Ruby Freeman, Cole's mother
- Marc Menchaca as Everett
- Ross Partridge as Randy
- Frank Hoyt Taylor as Clyde Freeman
- Tess Harper as Dorothy Freeman
- Cathy Lellie as Jody Hampton

== Production ==
In March 2016, it was announced Cynthia Nixon, Brian Geraghty, Marin Ireland and Michael Trotter had joined the cast of the film, with Braden King directing from a screenplay by Elizabeth Palmore based upon the 2012 novel of the same name by Carter Sickels. In November 2018, it was announced Philip Ettinger, Stacy Martin, Cosmo Jarvis, Kerry Bishé, Lili Taylor, Marc Menchaca, Tess Harper and Frank Hoyt Taylor had joined the cast of the film, replacing Nixon, Geraghty and Ireland. It was filmed in Harlan, Kentucky.

== Release ==
It had its world premiere at the Sundance Film Festival on January 27, 2020. In December 2020, Strand Releasing acquired U.S. distribution rights to the film. It was released on July 30, 2021.

== Reception ==
=== Critical response ===
The review aggregator website Rotten Tomatoes reports an approval rating of 75% with an average score of 6.7/10, based on 20 reviews.
