= Around the Horn (disambiguation) =

- Around the Horn is an American sports talk program.
- "Around the Horn" is a baseball term referring to either a "5-4-3" double play or the throw around the infield that occurs after an out is recorded.
- Around the Horn (album), a 1992 album by Souled American
- Around the Horn with Maynard Ferguson, a 1956 jazz album
- For the British radio comedy starring Kenneth Horne, see Round the Horne.
