= Tyrel (film) =

- Theatrical release poster
- Directed by: Sebastián Silva
- Written by: Sebastián Silva
- Produced by: Jacob Wasserman; Max Born; Sebastián Silva
- Starring: Jason Mitchell; Christopher Abbott; Michael Cera; Caleb Landry Jones
- Cinematography: Alexis Zabé
- Edited by: Sofia Subercaseaux; Jennifer Lame
- Production company: Hidden Content
- Distributed by: Magnolia Pictures
- Release dates: January 20, 2018 (Sundance); December 5, 2018 (United States)
- Running time: 86 minutes
- Country: United States
- Language: English
- Box office: $6,059

Tyrel is a 2018 American comedy drama film written and directed by Sebastián Silva and starring Jason Mitchell, Christopher Abbott, Michael Cera, Caleb Landry Jones, and Reg E. Cathey in his final film role. The story follows a raucous guys' weekend where Tyler, a Black man, attempts to fit in with the mostly white guests.

Tyrel had its world premiere at the Sundance Film Festival on January 20, 2018. It was released on December 5, 2018 by Magnolia Pictures.

== Plot ==
When his girlfriend's family temporarily takes over his Manhattan apartment, Tyler, a young Black man, agrees to join his friend Johnny for a guys' weekend of debauchery in the Catskill Mountains. On the way to the secluded cabin of Nico, the weekend's host, Johnny and Tyler are forced to push their car down a road while waiting for Johnny's friends to come get them. A group of friends arrives in a truck, with birthday celebrant Pete among them. Things get off to an awkward start when one of the guys greets Tyler as "Tyrel", with the true intention behind the mispronounced name not being made clear. Tyler later discovers that he is the only Black person at the gathering. On the first night, Tyler gets out of the rowdy festivities by claiming fatigue and heading to bed early, for which he is called a "wet blanket" by Johnny. As the guys engage in competitive trash-talking with one another, Tyler mostly bonds with Cosmo, a pit bull. The following night, Tyler decides to drink alongside everyone else, but once again finds himself out of sync with the other guests. Things shift with the arrival of latecomer Alan, a spoiled rich kid.

== Cast ==
- Jason Mitchell as Tyler
- Christopher Abbott as Johnny
- Michael Cera as Alan
- Caleb Landry Jones as Pete
- Roddy Bottum as Dylan
- Ann Dowd as Silvia
- Philip Ettinger as Charles
- Michael Zegen as Eli
- Reg E. Cathey as Reggie
- Max Born as Max
- Nicolas Arze as Nico

== Production ==
In March 2017, it was announced Sebastián Silva would write and direct the film, with Michael Cera, Caleb Landry Jones, Jason Mitchell, Christopher Abbott, and Roddy Bottom set to star. Filming, which took place at the actual residence of actor Nicolas Arze, was said to have been completed by May.

== Release ==
The film had its world premiere at the Sundance Film Festival in January 2018. Shortly after, Magnolia Pictures acquired distribution rights to the film. Tyrel was given a limited release on December 5, 2018.

== Reception ==
On Rotten Tomatoes, the film holds a 60% approval rating, based on 50 reviews with an average score of 6.3/10. The website's critics consensus reads: "Tyrel uses its seemingly innocuous setup to take an admirably uncomfortable -- albeit occasionally somewhat diffuse -- look at modern American race relations." On Metacritic, Tyrel has a score of 71 based on 18 critics' reviews, indicating "generally favorable reviews".

Because the film debuted at the 2018 Sundance Film Festival and dealt with themes like race and fish-out-of-water situations, Tyrel received comparisons to Get Out, which premiered at Sundance a year earlier and went on to become a major critical and commercial success. Critics noted the comparisons but also pointed out the differences between the films. Chris Nashawaty of Entertainment Weekly said, "It's both unavoidable and a bit unfair to compare writer-director Sebastian Silva's squirm-inducing new indie Tyrel to last year's Get Out. In most ways, they couldn't be more different. But in at least one major one, they're companion pieces about race, otherness, and slights both actual and perceived."

Positive reviews praised the story's social commentary and nuances. Dennis Harvey of Variety said "this lively, unpleasant seriocomedy...does very well at capturing the queasiness of being alone and uneasy at a party you immediately know you won't fit into", while David Fear of Rolling Stone called it "a character study, racial satire, and horror movie all in one." Fear added, "Viewers are both complicit in Tyler's breakdown — the look of self-contempt on his face after he's pressured to imitate an elderly black woman feels like a slap to ours — and right there with him as he goes deeper into a nightmare fueled by tone-deaf idiocy and too much Irish coffee."

Emily Yoshida of Vulture noted "the issue of Tyler's race — rarely addressed explicitly but of course always in the room — compounds all the garden-variety alienation." Writing for The New York Times, Bilge Ebiri commented that the film takes on a more "surreal" tone with Michael Cera's appearance, but said, "the stranger Tyrel gets, the more accurate it feels. The ecosystem of behaviors and attitudes on display is so unnervingly sharp that some of us may well find ourselves wincing in recognition." Critics also noted how the depictions of characters Nico and Dylan, who are Argentinian and gay, respectively, show how "something so theoretically nice as intersectional solidarity is not necessarily on the table here."

Multiple reviews commended Mitchell's performance, with Yoshida writing, "Silva makes a chamber orchestra of unconscious prejudice and passive-aggression out of his all-bro ensemble, with Mitchell's performance as the violin solo at the center of it that grows from a tentative tremolo to lonesome wail." Fear wrote Tyrel is "also one of the least dogmatic takes on the subject of race in ages, and so much of that is courtesy of [Mitchell]."

Criticisms focused on the script's occasional heavy-handedness and the film's skirting of deeper issues on race. Nashawaty wrote, "Where Silva is slightly less successful is when he telegraphs things too much. The weekend happens to fall during the inauguration of Donald Trump." While some critics welcomed the subtle way in which the subject matter was handled, others said it made for a tepid and relatively uneventful film. Yolanda Machado of TheWrap expressed that the film did not go far enough into why Tyler felt the need to code-switch and fit in with this all-white group. Harvey commented, "Nothing terrible happens in Tyrel, at least no more terrible than the kind of weekend you hope to forget because of personal behavior you don't entirely remember anyway, among people you'd probably prefer not to see again."

== See also ==
- List of black films of the 2010s
