= One Dollar (TV series) =

- Genre: Mystery; Thriller; Drama
- Created by: Jason Mosberg
- Directed by: Craig Zobel
- Starring: John Carroll Lynch; Nathaniel Martello-White; Philip Ettinger; Christopher Denham; Kirrilee Berger; Joshua Bitton; Níkẹ Uche Kadri; Gracie Lawrence; Hamilton Clancy
- Composer: Heather McIntosh
- Country of origin: United States
- Original language: English
- No. of seasons: 1
- No. of episodes: 10

Production
- Executive producers: Rafael Yglesias; Jason Mosberg; Graham Gordy; Alexandre Dauman; Matt DeRoss; Craig Zobel
- Producers: Kris Baucom; Jonathan Starch
- Cinematography: Darran Tiernan
- Editors: Jane Rizzo; William Henry; Karen Sim
- Camera setup: Single-camera
- Running time: 49–59 minutes
- Production companies: Zobot Projects; Anonymous Content; CBS Television Studios

Original release
- Network: CBS All Access
- Release: August 30 – November 1, 2018

One Dollar is an American mystery thriller drama television series created by Jason Mosberg that premiered on August 30, 2018, on CBS All Access. The series centers on the denizens of a small rust belt community and shifts perspective from person to person as a dollar bill changes hands. The ensemble cast consists of John Carroll Lynch, Nathaniel Martello-White, Philip Ettinger, Christopher Denham, Kirrilee Berger, Joshua Bitton, Níkẹ Uche Kadri, Gracie Lawrence, and Hamilton Clancy. On December 12, 2018, it was announced that the series had been canceled after one season.

== Premise ==
One Dollar is set in "a small rustbelt town in post-recession America, where a one-dollar bill changing hands connects a group of characters involved in a shocking multiple murder. The path of the dollar bill, and point of view in each episode, paints a picture of a modern American town with deep class and cultural divides that spill out into the open as the town's secrets get revealed."

== Cast and characters ==
=== Main ===
- John Carroll Lynch as Bud Carl
- Nathaniel Martello-White as Jake Noveer
- Philip Ettinger as Garrett Drimmer
- Christopher Denham as Peter Trask
- Kirrilee Berger as Danielle "Dannie" Furlbee
- Joshua Bitton as Chewy
- Níkẹ Uche Kadri as Rook
- Gracie Lawrence as Julie Gardner
- Hamilton Clancy as Tom

=== Recurring ===
- Ashlie Atkinson as Terri Mitchell
- Greg Germann as Wilson Furlbee
- Erik LaRay Harvey as Dante
- Josh Salatin as Tyler Bennett
- Adelyn and Emerson Bowman as Carrie Drimmer
- Lucy Owen as Sandy Furlbee
- Gregory Johnstone as Jonno
- Margot Bingham as Cass
- Sturgill Simpson as Ken Fry
- Manuel Herrera as Michael Goodman
- Medusa as Reverend Etta Whitney
- Ida Chapman as Cooper Shaw
- Wayne Duvall as Benjamin Walsh
- Nicolas Hardin as Ricky Mitchell
- Kristy Nolen as Lori Brenneman
- Jeb Kreager as Officer Martin Huddle
- Leslie Odom Jr. as Randall Abatsy
- Aleksa Palladino as Chelsea Wyler
- Deirdre O'Connell as Carol
- Che Tafari as Markell Jenkins
- James McMenamin as Rick
- Nancy McNulty as Mary Shaw
- Jeff Perry as Charles Wyler
- Meredith Holzman
- Mary MacDonald Kerr as Janet Miller
- Lindsay Burdge as Jenny Ludlow
- Gia Crovatin
- Jacob Knoll as Dan Fry
- Kate Nowlin as Cathy
- Timothy Busfield as Uncle Rich
- Pernell Walker as Laila
- Jayden Marine as Cesar
- David Drumm as Old Man
- Nathan Hollabaugh as Adam
- Maya Sayre as Heidi
- Rachel McKeon as Robyn

=== Guest ===
- Timothy Busfield as Uncle Rich ("Chelsea Wyler")
- Lindsay Burdge as Jenny Ludlow ("Jenny Ludlow")
- Annie Golden ("Jenny Ludlow")
- Darius Kaleb as Jeremy ("Jenny Ludlow")
- Denise Burse ("Wilson Furlbee")
- Cotter Smith as Mayor Britt ("Wilson Furlbee")
- Susan Blommaert ("Cooper Shaw")
- Matt Chapman as Clark Shaw ("Cooper Shaw")

== Episodes ==
No.	Title	Directed by	Written by	Original release date
1	"Garrett Drimmer"	Craig Zobel	Jason Mosberg	August 30, 2018
2	"Ken Fry"	Craig Zobel	Story by : Jason Mosberg; Teleplay by : Jason Mosberg and Ann Packer & Rafael Yglesias	September 6, 2018
3	"Carol Seerveld"	Craig Zobel	Ann Packer & Rafael Yglesias and Jason Mosberg	September 13, 2018
4	"Chelsea Wyler"	Craig Zobel	Story by : Jason Mosberg; Teleplay by : Jason Mosberg and Ann Packer & Rafael Yglesias	September 20, 2018
5	"Jenny Ludlow"	Craig Zobel	Ann Packer & Rafael Yglesias	September 27, 2018
6	"Wilson Furlbee"	Craig Zobel	Story by : Ann Packer; Teleplay by : Ann Packer and Graham Gordy	October 4, 2018
7	"Cooper Shaw"	Craig Zobel	Story by : Ann Packer & Rafael Yglesias and Jason Mosberg; Teleplay by : Graham Gordy and Ann Packer & Rafael Yglesias	October 11, 2018
8	"Dante Jenkins"	Craig Zobel	Graham Gordy	October 18, 2018
9	"Rick Mitchell"	Craig Zobel	Rafael Yglesias	October 25, 2018
10	"Jake Noveer"	Craig Zobel	Graham Gordy	November 1, 2018

== Production ==
Promotional poster

=== Development ===
On August 1, 2017, it was announced that CBS All Access had given the production, then titled $1, a series order. The series was created by Jason Mosberg and was set to be executive produced by Matt DeRoss, Alexandre Dauman, and Craig Zobel, who was also expected to direct. Production companies involved with the series were slated to include CBS Television Studios and Anonymous Content. On July 2, 2018, it was announced that the series had been retitled One Dollar and that it would premiere on August 30, 2018. On December 12, 2018, it was announced that CBS All Access had canceled the series.

=== Casting ===
On March 6, 2018, it was announced that John Carroll Lynch, Philip Ettinger, Chris Denham, Nathaniel Martello-White, Kirrilee Berger, and Gracie Lawrence had joined the main cast as series regulars and that Jeff Perry, Leslie Odom Jr., and Sturgill Simpson were cast in recurring roles. Later that month, the cast was rounded out with the addition of Nike Kadri, Joshua Bitton, and Hamilton Clancy as series regulars and Ashlie Atkinson as a recurring guest star. On April 10, 2018, it was announced that Aleksa Palladino had joined the cast in a recurring capacity.

=== Filming ===
Principal photography for the first season began on March 27, 2018, in Pittsburgh, Pennsylvania. Since it was filmed in Pittsburgh, it was decided that the region's Yinzer accent would be prominently displayed, one of the first programs filmed in the city to use the accent prominently.

== Release ==
On July 2, 2018, a promotional poster for the series was released. On August 5, 2018, a teaser trailer for the series was released. On August 13, 2018, the official trailer was released.

== Reception ==
The series has been met with a generally positive response from critics upon its premiere. On the review aggregation website Rotten Tomatoes, the series holds an 80% approval rating, with an average rating of 6 out of 10 based on 10 reviews. Metacritic, which uses a weighted average, assigned the series a score of 64 out of 100 based on 6 critics, indicating "generally favorable reviews".

In a positive review, Los Angeles Times's Robert Lloyd praised the series saying, "The excellence of the acting and the admirable, one might almost say English naturalism of the production balance the sometimes improbable, even implausible action and the occasional sacrifice of sense to drama; it is true that in life, people do not act sensibly, but fictional characters should be held to a higher standard of consistency. Still, the writing gives the actors a lot to play with." In a more mixed critique, TV Guide's Liam Mathews discussed the show's various sub-plots saying, "They writers are much more interested in the vignettes that build out the town...These smaller side stories give the show an indie movie-like texture about people trying to make it in America. They're sort of like short films within the bigger show, and they contain much of the show's best writing and acting. They would be better if they didn't have the unnecessary dollar bill gimmick connecting them all, but it's not that distracting." In an outright negative assessment, The Hollywood Reporter's Tim Goodman criticized the series saying, "There's not enough good writing here, not enough motivation to follow characters that are either intentionally half-baked or are merely uninteresting. Characters have quirks, but the quirks prove there's not much else there. Smart people eventually do exceptionally dumb things."

== See also ==
- Twenty Bucks, a 1993 film with a similar premise and structure, albeit more comical.
