= Fe (Souled American album) =

Album by Souled American

Studio album by Souled American
- Released: 1988
- Recorded: 1988
- Length: 46:49
- Label: Rough Trade
- Producer: Souled American, Jeff Hamand, Jim Rondinelli

Souled American chronology
| Fe (1988) | Flubber (1989) |

Professional ratings
Review scores
| Source | Rating |
|---|---|
| AllMusic | 4/5 stars |

Fe is the debut album by Chicago-based alternative country band Souled American. It was released in 1988 by Rough Trade Records, and re-released, as part of the Framed box set, by tUMULt Records in 1999. The title of the album (pronounced "fee") was taken from the word used by Bob Marley for "feel."

== Production ==
According to 35 Days of Fe, a booklet by Camden Joy based on his research and interviews with the participants, Fe was created with minimal overdubs in different studios over weekends and evenings when co-producer Jim Rondinelli was able to obtain the most favorable rates.

The debut stands apart from the rest of their more experimental discography, not just because the others were each recorded in a single studio but because of how well Fe documents the high-energy live performances that first caught the ear of the American subsidiary of Rough Trade Records to earn them a recording contract.

Defining features include the unusual dominance of Joe Adducci’s busy bass guitar, the rich evocative drawl of Chris Grigoroff's vocals, and a rhythm section that brought reggae-and-roots upbeats to the group’s folk-infused originals. The album performed poorly, failing to attract much critical attention outside of the band’s native Midwest. It was the first of three Souled American albums released over an eighteen-month period that concluded with the collapse of their record label.

== Critical reception ==
"Fe," wrote Mark Guarino, in his book Country & Midwestern, "became an instant benchmark for a genre that had yet to be defined." Writing in a syndicated review for Knight-Ridder, Tom Moon observed, "The bass and drum parts are locked up throughout, revisiting Bo Diddley beats and twang-bar blues with appropriate punk-like recklessness."

== Track listing ==
1. "Notes Campfire" – (4:52)
2. "Field & Stream" – (3:16)
3. "Soldier's Joy" – (2:34)
4. "Full Picture" – (2:37)
5. "Make Me Laugh, Make Me Cry" – (4:03)
6. "Fisher's Hornpipe" – (2:33)
7. "Tall Boy Blues" – (3:39)
8. "Magic Bullets" – (3:22)
9. "Lottery Brazil" – (3:15)
10. "Goin' Home" – (4:24)
11. "She Broke My Heart" – (4:45)
12. "True Swamp Too" – (3:48)
13. "Feel Better" – (3:33)

All songs by Souled American except "Soldier's Joy" and "Fisher's Hornpipe" traditionals.

== Personnel ==
- Joe Adducci – bass, vocals
- Jamey Barnard – drums
- Chris Grigoroff – guitar, vocals
- Scott Tuma – guitar
- Bob Egan – pedal steel on "Tall Boy Blues," "She Broke My Heart"
