= Triumph of the Will (upcoming film) =

- Directed by: Gabriel Nussbaum
- Written by: Gabriel Nussbaum
- Produced by: David Kaplan; Andrew Morrison; Gabriel Nussbaum; Elizabeth Wood
- Starring: Shira Haas; Samuel H Levine; Betsy Aidem; Simon Helberg; John Carroll Lynch; Philip Ettinger
- Production companies: Kaplan Morrison; Bank Street Films
- Country: United States
- Language: English

Triumph of the Will is an upcoming American historical drama film written and directed by Gabriel Nussbaum. It stars Shira Haas, Samuel H Levine, Betsy Aidem, Simon Helberg, John Carroll Lynch, and Philip Ettinger.

== Premise ==
A woman leaves her husband in Amsterdam in 1937 to start a new life with her daughter in Berlin. She takes up with a firebrand rabbi on a mission to help Jews get out of Nazi Germany.

== Cast ==
- Shira Haas
- Samuel H Levine
- Betsy Aidem
- Simon Helberg
- John Carroll Lynch
- Philip Ettinger
- Carolyn Kettig

== Production ==
Gabriel Nussbaum made his directorial debut for a period war drama film set in Nazi Germany, with principal photography commencing on July 17, 2025, in New York. Filming also occurred in Troy and Albany, New York.

Filming wrapped in February 2026, with Shira Haas, Samuel H Levine, Betsy Aidem, Simon Helberg, John Carroll Lynch, Philip Ettinger, and Carolyn Kettig revealed as part of the cast.
