= Lovers (2020 film) =

Film by Nicole Garcia

- Theatrical release poster
- French: Amants
- Directed by: Nicole Garcia
- Written by: Nicole Garcia; Jacques Fieschi
- Produced by: Philippe Martin; David Thion
- Starring: Pierre Niney; Stacy Martin; Benoît Magimel; Christophe Montenez; Nicolas Wanczycki; Grégoire Colin; Roxane Duran
- Cinematography: Christophe Beaucarne
- Edited by: Frédéric Baillehaiche; Juliette Welfling
- Music by: Grégoire Hetzel
- Production companies: Les Films Pelléas; Mars Films; Mars Cinéma; France 3 Cinéma; Impala; Pauline's Angel
- Distributed by: Wild Bunch
- Release dates: 3 September 2020 (Venice); 17 November 2021 (France)
- Running time: 102 minutes
- Country: France
- Language: French
- Box office: $1.9 million

Lovers (French: Amants) is a 2020 French romantic thriller film directed by Nicole Garcia, who co-wrote the screenplay with Jacques Fieschi. It stars Pierre Niney, Stacy Martin and Benoît Magimel.

The film had its world premiere at the 77th Venice International Film Festival on 3 September 2020. It was released theatrically in France on 17 November 2021 by Wild Bunch.

== Plot ==
In Paris, young lovers, student Lisa (Stacy Martin) and drug dealer Simon (Pierre Niney), split when Simon has to flee the country. Heartbroken Lisa soon meets older and wealthy Léo (Benoît Magimel).

There are three locales, Paris, Mauritius and Geneva. We move from place to place as Lisa changes from girlfriend of a drug dealer to housewife of a rich businessman, to both when having an affair with Simon while married to Léo.

On Mauritius, the gorgeous surroundings contrast with Lisa being miserable and Léo almost forcing himself on her. Then, Simon turns up as a tour guide at their resort.

Lisa makes the men around her suffer while trying not to hurt anybody. Simon is a con-man with no options but Lisa and her money. Léo, who has a shady past, hopes to buy happiness.

Léo hires Simon as his driver. It looks like they could become friends, until Léo discards Simon like a used Kleenex.

In this world of haves and have-nots, of serve-or-be-served, you're either young, poor and in love, or older, rich and despairing. Lisa is caught between Simon and Léo, and either leads to ruin.

== Cast ==
- Stacy Martin as Lisa
- Pierre Niney as Simon
- Benoît Magimel as Léo Redler
- Christophe Montenez as Pierre-Henri
- Nicolas Wanczycki as Lisa's father
- Grégoire Colin as Paul
- Roxane Duran as Nathalie

== Production ==
In December 2018, it was announced Pierre Niney, Stacy Martin and Benoît Magimel had joined the cast of the film, with Nicole Garcia directing from a screenplay she co-wrote with Jacques Fieschi.

== Release ==
The film had its world premiere at the 77th Venice International Film Festival on 3 September 2020. It was released theatrically in France on 17 November 2021 by Wild Bunch.
