= John Carroll Lynch =

American actor and film director (born 1963)

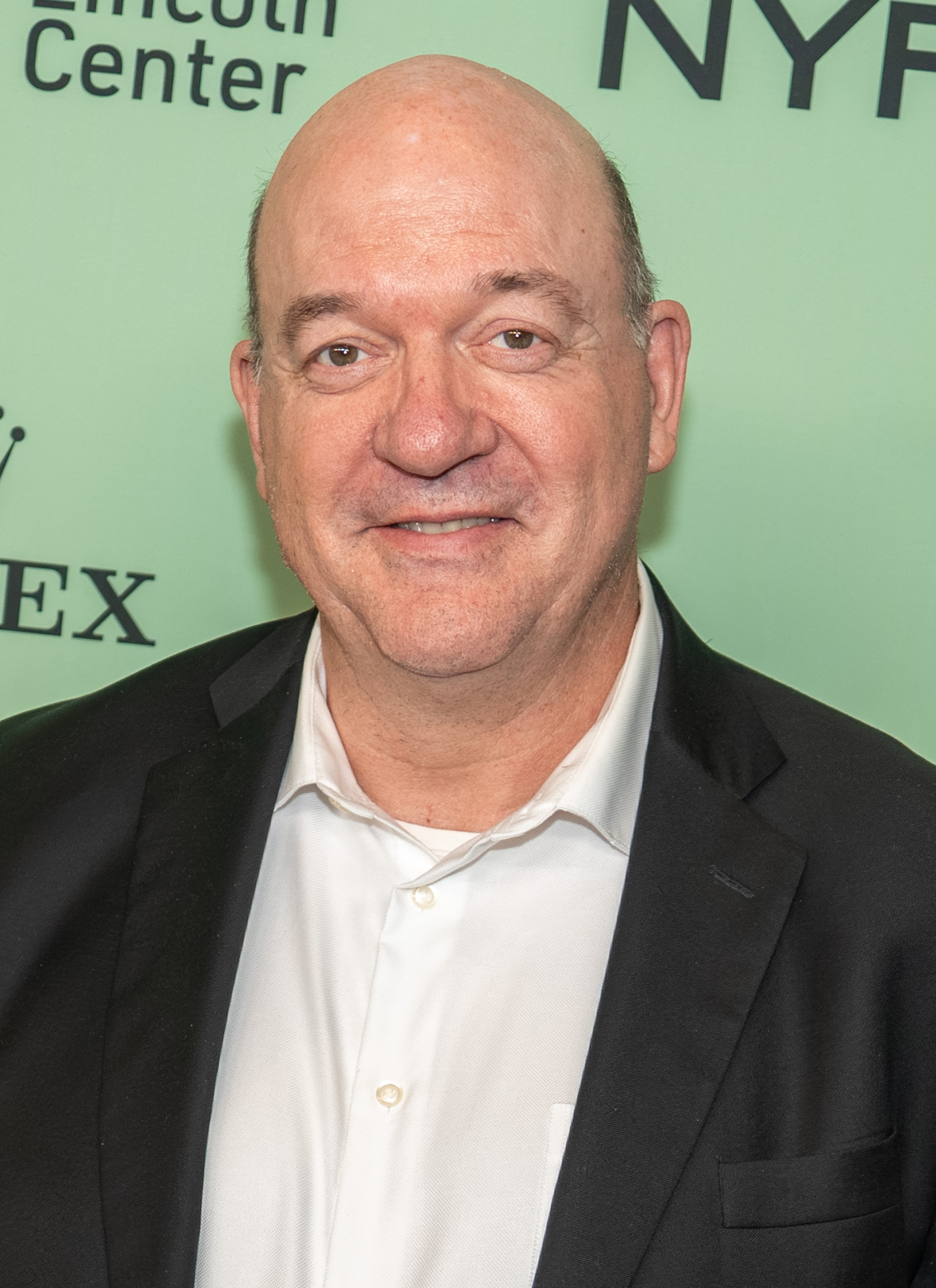
- Lynch in 2025
- Born: August 1, 1963 (age 63); Boulder, Colorado, U.S.
- Education: Catholic University (BFA)
- Occupations: Actor, director
- Years active: 1990–present
- Spouse: Brenda Wehle (m. 1997)

John Carroll Lynch (born August 1, 1963) is an American character actor and film director. He first gained notice for his role as Norm Gunderson in Fargo (1996). He is also known for his television work on the ABC sitcom The Drew Carey Show (1997–2004) as the title character's cross-dressing brother, Steve Carey, as well as on four seasons of American Horror Story (2014–2019), most notably as breakout character Twisty the Clown. His films include Face/Off (1997), Mercury Rising (1998) Gothika (2003), Zodiac (2007), Gran Torino (2008), Shutter Island (2010), Crazy, Stupid, Love (2011), Ted 2 (2015), The Invitation (2015), The Founder (2016), and The Trial of the Chicago 7 (2020). He made his directorial debut with the 2017 film Lucky.

== Life and career ==
=== Early years and education ===
Lynch was born on August 1, 1963, in Boulder, Colorado. He attended Regis Jesuit High School in Denver. He studied theater at The Catholic University of America, graduating with a Bachelor of Fine Arts degree in 1986.

=== Career ===
Lynch was a member of the Guthrie Theater company. He starred in several productions, toured with the company and worked there for over eight seasons.

Lynch made his feature film debut in Grumpy Old Men (1993). He gained notice in a supporting role as Norm Gunderson in the Coen brothers' film Fargo (1996). His other notable films are Face/Off (1997), Bubble Boy (2001), Gothika (2003), Things We Lost in the Fire (2007), Gran Torino (2008), Shutter Island (2010), Paul (2011) and Crazy, Stupid, Love (2011). He portrayed Arthur Leigh Allen in Zodiac (2007) and the first establisher of McDonald's, Mac McDonald, in The Founder (2016).

Lynch has also had an extensive career in television. He appeared in ABC sitcom The Drew Carey Show as the title character's cross-dressing brother, Steve Carey. He has also been a regular cast member on series such as Close to Home, Carnivàle, Body of Proof and seasons 4, 5, 7 and 9 of American Horror Story.

In 2018, Lynch was cast in the lead role of Bud Carl in the CBS All Access drama One Dollar. The series was cancelled after one season. In 2020, Lynch plays the lead role of Rick Legarski in the ABC crime drama series Big Sky, created by David E. Kelley. After his character was killed off, he resurfaced as Wolf Legarski, Rick's twin brother. He also co-starred in Aaron Sorkin's acclaimed film The Trial of the Chicago 7, as activist David Dellinger. In 2025, he co-starred in the 1st season of Ballard alongside Maggie Q.

In 2025, Lynch made his Broadway debut, playing Creon in Oedipus, directed by Robert Icke.

== Personal life ==
Lynch has been married to actress Brenda Wehle (also a former member of the Guthrie Theatre Company) since 1997.

== Theatre credits ==
Year	Title	Role	Notes
2025	Oedipus	Creon	Broadway Debut

== Filmography ==
=== Film ===
Year	Title	Role	Notes
1993	Grumpy Old Men	Moving Man	
1995	The Cure	Skipper #1	Credited as John Lynch
1996	Beautiful Girls	Frank Womack	
1996	Fargo	Norm Gunderson	
1996	Feeling Minnesota	Cop	
1997	Volcano	Stan Olber	
1997	Face/Off	Prison Guard Walton	
1997	A Thousand Acres	Ken LeSalle	
1998	Mercury Rising	Martin Lynch	
1998	The Naked Man	Sticks' Driver	
1998	Restaurant	John English	
1999	Anywhere but Here	Jack Irwin	
1999	The Minus Man	Bartender	Uncredited cameo
1999	Pushing Tin	Doctor Freeze	
1999	Freak Weather	Ed	
2000	Waking the Dead	Father Mileski	
2000	Gone in 60 Seconds	Impound Manager	Uncredited cameo
2001	Bubble Boy	Mr. Livingston	
2002	The Good Girl	Jack Field	
2002	Bug	Wallace Gregory	
2002	Three Days of Rain	Dinner Guest	
2003	Gothika	Sheriff Ryan	
2003	Confidence	Leon Ashby	
2004	Catch That Kid	Al Hartmann	
2005	Mozart and the Whale	Gregory	
2005	Trust the Man	Doctor	Scene deleted
2005	Looking for Comedy in the Muslim World	Stewart	
2007	Full of It	Hank Leonard	
2007	Zodiac	Arthur Leigh Allen	
2007	Things We Lost in the Fire	Howard Glassman	
2008	Gran Torino	Barber Martin	
2009	Love Happens	Walter	
2010	Sympathy for Delicious	Evangelist Carroll	
2010	Shutter Island	Deputy Warden McPherson	
2010	Hesher	Larry	
2011	Paul	Moses Buggs	
2011	Crazy, Stupid, Love	Bernie Riley	
2012	Lay the Favorite	Dave Greenberg	
2013	The Pretty One	Frank	
2014	Camp X-Ray	Col. James Drummond	
2015	Hot Pursuit	Captain Emmett	
2015	Ted 2	Tom Jessup	
2015	The Invitation	Pruitt	
2016	Miracles from Heaven	Pastor Scott	
2016	Jackie	Lyndon B. Johnson	
2016	The Founder	Mac McDonald	
2016	Shangri-La Suite	Colonel Tom Parker	
2017	Lucky	—N/a	Directorial debut
2017	Anything	Early Landry	
2018	Private Life	Charlie	
2018	White Orchid	Sheriff Mann	
2019	The Highwaymen	Lee Simmons	
2020	Kiss Me Before It Blows Up	Ron Shalev	
2020	The Trial of the Chicago 7	David Dellinger	
2024	Outlaw Posse	Carson	
2024	Babes	Dr. Morris	
2025	Sorry, Baby	Pete	
2025	She Rides Shotgun	Houser	
2026	Family Movie	TBA	Post-production
TBA	Triumph of the Will	TBA	Post-production

=== Television ===
Year	Title	Role	Notes
1996	Frasier	Actor playing Franklin	Episode: "The Show Where Diane Comes Back"
1996	Murder One	Officer Carl Bickley	Episode: "Chapter Thirteen"
1996	The Client	Frank	Episode: "Damn Yankees"
1996	Voice from the Grave	Prosecutor O'Gane	Television film
1996	A Friend's Betrayal	Mr. Franks	Television film
1996, 1997	Life's Work	District Attorney Agee / Crazy Larry	2 episodes
1997–2004	The Drew Carey Show	Steve Carey	Main role (seasons 6–8), recurring role (seasons 3–5), guest (season 9), 72 episodes
1997	The Practice	Dr. Robert Larson	Episode: "Search and Seizure"
1997	The Visitor	Joe York	Episode: "Going Home"
1998	From the Earth to the Moon	Robert R. Gilruth	2 episodes
1999	Star Trek: Voyager	Gerald Moss	Episode: "11:59"
1999	Late Last Night	Sgt. Van Wyck	Television film
1999	Tuesdays with Morrie	Walter Moran	Television film
2000	The Fugitive	Raynor	Episode: "Pilot"
2000	The West Wing	Jack	Episode: "Galileo"
2001	Gideon's Crossing	Sonny Green	Episode: "The Race"
2002	Live from Baghdad	John Holliman	Television film
2003	The Brotherhood of Poland, New Hampshire	Mayor Garrett Shaw	7 episodes
2005	Carnivàle	Varlyn Stroud	12 episodes
2005	American Dad!	Mr. Simms	Voice; episode: "Stannie Get Your Gun"
2005–2006	Close to Home	Steve Sharpe	Main role
2007–2008	K-Ville	Captain James Embry	Main role
2007	Big Love	Officer Chuck Tuttle	2 episodes
2009	Lie to Me	Mr. Reed	Episode: "Truth or Consequences"
2009	Monk	Kurt Pressman	Episode: "Happy Birthday, Mr. Monk"
2009	CSI: Crime Scene Investigation	Buddy Arnold	Episode: "Bloodsport"
2010	How to Make It in America	Larry	Episode: "Keep on Truck'n"
2010–2012	The Glades	Mike Ogletree	2 episodes
2011–2013	Body of Proof	Bud Morris	Main role
2013	Do No Harm	Will Hayes	10 episodes
2013–2014	Comedy Bang! Bang!	Ned Dooley	2 episodes
2014	House of Lies	Gil Selby	2 episodes
2014	The Americans	Fred	6 episodes
2014	Manhattan	Daniel Ellis	2 episodes
2014	Us & Them	Ed	Episode: "Coeds & Carburetors"
2014–2015	American Horror Story: Freak Show	Twisty the Clown	5 episodes
2015	The Walking Dead	Eastman	Episode: "Here's Not Here"
2015–2016	American Horror Story: Hotel	John Wayne Gacy	2 episodes
2016	Billions	Mr. Gilbert	Episode: "The Punch"
2016–2017	Turn: Washington's Spies	James Rivington	8 episodes
2017	American Horror Story: Cult	Twisty the Clown	2 episodes
2017	Channel Zero: The No-End House	John Sleator	6 episodes
2018	The Handmaid's Tale	Dan	Episode: "Unwomen"
2018	Crawford	Owen	12 episodes
2018	One Dollar	Bud Carl	Main role
2018	The Good Cop	Sherman Smalls	Episode: "Who Is the Ugly German Lady?"
2019	Veep	Lloyd Hennick	3 episodes
2019	American Horror Story: 1984	Benjamin Richter / Mr. Jingles	9 episodes
2019–2020	Perfect Harmony	Pastor Magnus	3 episodes
2020–2022	Big Sky	Rick Legarski / Wolf Legarski	22 episodes
2021	American Horror Stories	Larry Bitterman	Episode: "Drive In"
2022	Gaslit	L. Patrick Gray	4 episodes
2023	White House Plumbers	John N. Mitchell	2 episodes
2024	Evil	Henry Stick	Episode: "Fear of the Future"
2025	Ballard	Thomas Laffont	10 episodes
2025	Elsbeth	Judge Edwin Dousant	2 episodes
2026	The Beauty	Meyer Williams	3 episodes
2026	Star Wars: Maul - Shadow Lord	Nico Deemis	Episode: "Chapter 1: The Dark Revenge"
2026	American Horror Story: 13	Twisty the Clown	Episode: "1:13 AM"

== Awards and nominations ==
Year	Association	Category	Nominated work	Result	Ref.
2016	Saturn Awards	Best Guest Starring Role on Television	The Walking Dead	Nominated	
2017	Fangoria Chainsaw Awards	Best Supporting Actor	The Invitation	Nominated	
2017	Camerimage	Directors' Debuts Competition	Lucky	Nominated	
2017	Chicago Film Critics Association	Most Promising Filmmaker	Lucky	Nominated	
2017	Haifa International Film Festival	Carmel Award for Best Film	Lucky	Nominated	
2017	Haifa International Film Festival	Fedeora Award - Directors of Tomorrow	Lucky	Won	
2017	Locarno Festival	Golden Leopard	Lucky	Nominated	
2017	Locarno Festival	Prize of the Ecumenical Jury	Lucky	Won	
2017	Satellite Awards	Special Achievement Award for Best First Feature	Lucky	Won	
2017	Los Angeles Film Festival	Special Mention for Acting	Anything	Won	
2021	Screen Actors Guild Awards	Outstanding Performance by a Cast in a Motion Picture	The Trial of the Chicago 7	Won	
