= Flubber (album) =

Studio album by Souled American
- Released: 1989
- Recorded: 1989
- Genre: Country folk
- Length: 50:59
- Label: Rough Trade
- Producers: Souled American, Jeff Hamand

Souled American chronology
Fe (1988)	Flubber (1989)	Around the Horn (1990)

Flubber is the second album by Chicago-based band Souled American. It was released in 1989 by Rough Trade Records, and re-released, as part of the Framed box set, by tUMULt Records in 1999. "Cupa Cowfee" is the band's interpretation of the John Fahey song "The Last Steam Engine Train".

In 2025, Camden Joy, who became the band's manager in 2023, wrote and self-published a slim book about the album, Unforgetting Flubber: The Making of an Unremembered Classic by an Unremembered Band.

== Critical reception ==
Professional ratings
Review scores
Source	Rating
AllMusic	4/5 stars
Chicago Tribune	3/4 stars
New Musical Express	8/10

The Chicago Tribune wrote: "Employing odd, broken rhythms and unorthodox sequences of notes and chords in a guitars-bass-drums format, Souled American basically breaks up the conventions of country-folk then reassembles them in a new and distinctive way." The Chicago Reader called Flubber "an offhandedly pretty and searchingly lyrical record."

Tracy Santa, writing in the San Francisco Bay Guardian, described it as "a postmodern Music from Big Pink" and "lost soul music" adding, "Aside from the deadpan joy and unpredictable creakiness of it all, what has probably kept me listening is that I just don’t have the slightest idea what they’re singing about. Do I care? There have always been plenty of easy answers floating around in pop music (see 'hook'). Flubber sounds like it’s having a hard time posing a question. I can respect that kind of confusion."

== Track listing ==
1. "All Good Things" (Adducci) – (4:41)
2. "Mar'boro Man" (Adducci/Grigoroff) – (2:56)
3. "Wind to Dry" (Adducci) – (4:08)
4. "Drop in the Basket" (Grigoroff) – (2:59)
5. "Heywire" (Adducci/Grigoroff/Tuma) – (2:33)
6. "The Torch Singer" (Prine) – (7:08)
7. "True Swamp" (Adducci/Barnard/Grigoroff/Tuma) – (3:19)
8. "Marleyphine Hank" (Adducci/Grigoroff) – (2:33)
9. "You and You Alone" (Adducci) – (4:41)
10. "Cupa Cowfee" (Fahey) – (2:14)
11. "Over the Hill" (Grigoroff) – (4:57)
12. "Zillion" (Adducci) – (4:55)
13. "Why Are You" (Adducci/Grigoroff) – (3:37)

== Personnel ==
- Joe Adducci – bass, vocals
- Jamey Barnard – drums
- Chris Grigoroff – guitar, vocals
- Scott Tuma – guitar
