= Here (2011 film) =

American drama film

- Film poster
- Directed by: Braden King
- Written by: Braden King; Dani Valent
- Produced by: Braden King; Lars Knudsen; Jay Van Hoy
- Starring: Ben Foster; Lubna Azabal
- Cinematography: Lol Crawley
- Edited by: Nat Sanders
- Music by: Boxhead Ensemble
- Distributed by: Strand Releasing
- Release dates: January 2011 (Sundance Film Festival); April 13, 2012 (United States)
- Running time: 126 minutes
- Country: United States
- Language: English

Here is a 2011 American drama adventure film directed by Braden King, who also co-wrote with Dani Valent. The film stars Ben Foster and Lubna Azabal.

== Plot ==
Will Shepard (Foster), a solitary young man who lives in the San Francisco Bay area, travels to Armenia to undertake a mapping survey in the rural areas of the country to confirm ground features and coordinates with GPS satellite data. There he meets Gadarine Nazarian (Azabal), a spirited Armenian expat and professional photographer, who has returned home to face family issues. She decides to accompany Will on his journey, acting as his interpreter, while taking photographs too. They fall in love as they wander the countryside. Their affair lasts several days, but he has to move on.

== Production ==
The film was shot on location in Armenia. After filming of the movie ended, five members of the cast and crew, including Ben Foster, got tattooed with the letters T.I.A., which stands for This Is Armenia.

== Reception ==
Here garnered mostly positive reviews and holds a 71% positive rating on Rotten Tomatoes based on 13 reviews. The film won the Special Jury Prize at the 2011 Berlin Film Festival. Stephen Holden of The New York Times said of the film, "Here, filmed by Lol Crowley, is still a stunner. Flawed as it is, I admire it immensely."

== Awards and nominations ==
- 2011 Berlin Film Festival
  - Special Jury Prize (Won)
- 2012 Independent Spirit Awards
  - Best Cinematography: Lol Crowley (Nominated)
