= Sonny (album) =

Studio album by Souled American
- Released: 1992
- Recorded: 1992
- Genre: Rock
- Length: 35:52
- Label: Rough Trade
- Producers: Souled American, Jeff Hamand

Souled American chronology
Around the Horn (1990)	Sonny (1992)	Frozen (1994)

Professional ratings
Review scores
Source	Rating
AllMusic	4/5 stars

Sonny is the fourth album by Chicago-based alternative country band Souled American and the first to be released after the departure of drummer Jamey Barnard. Like their first three albums, it was released in 1992 by Rough Trade Records, though Sonny was only released in the UK after Rough Trade's American branch folded. It was re-released as part of the Framed box set, by tUMULt Records in 1999. Sonny is also set apart from other Souled American releases by its content being almost completely cover songs, the only originals being the first and final instrumental tracks (the latter of which was composed by bassist Joe Adducci's mother).

== Track listing ==
1. "Sonny" (Souled American) – 2:08
2. "Dark as a Dungeon" (Merle Travis) – 4:43
3. "Please Don't Let Me Love You" (Ralph Jones) – 2:39
4. "Buck Dancer's Choice" (trad.) – 2:55
5. "If You Don't Want My Love" (John Prine) – 3:51
6. "Changin' the Words" (Louvin Brothers) – 2:57
7. "Little Bessie" (trad.) – 5:05
8. "Blue Eyes Crying in the Rain" (Willie Nelson) – 3:30
9. "Rock That Cradle Lucy" (trad.) – 2:28
10. "Not Over" (Adducci) – 4:36

== Personnel ==
- Joe Adducci – bass, vocals
- Chris Grigoroff – guitar, vocals
- Scott Tuma – guitar
