= Pinetop Seven =

American alternative country band

- Origin: Chicago, Illinois
- Genres: Alt country; indie rock
- Years active: 1994–2006
- Labels: Truckstop; Empyrean; Atavistic
- Members: Darren Richard; Nate Walcott; Melissa Bach; Mack Hagood; Ned Folkerth
- Past members: Charles Kim; Ryan Hembrey

Pinetop Seven is an American band from Chicago, Illinois. The group initially revolved around three core members, supplemented by instruments such as double bass, accordion, slide guitar, banjo, and mandolin; more recent recordings have a more fluid lineup and increasingly orchestral textures. The group is a key representative of the Chicago alt country musical scene.

== History ==
Bandmembers Darren Richard and Charles Kim first met at Vanderbilt University, and began playing music on the Nashville club scene starting in 1990; in 1994, they moved to Chicago and formed Pinetop Seven. After adding Ryan Hembrey to the lineup in 1995, the band began touring, and eventually landed a record deal with Truckstop Records, who began releasing the band's material in 1997. 1998's Rigging the Toplights featured clarinet work from fellow Chicagoan Ken Vandermark. In 2000, Charles Kim left the band, and the group expanded to a larger ensemble featuring more orchestral musical textures, beginning with 2000's Bringing Home the Last Great Strike. Their 2005 release The Night's Bloom and its subsequent sessions release, Beneath Confederate Lake, feature further orchestral exploration, as well as a revamped core of members, featuring original member Richard, trumpeter Nate Walcott, cellist Melissa Bach, bassist Andy Rader, guitarist Mack Hagood, and drummer Ned Folkerth.

Throughout its career, the band garnered considerable critical acclaim from outlets such as Pitchfork Media, NPR radio, One Times One, The Orlando Weekly, Paste Magazine, and others.

A few months after the release of Beneath Confederate Lake, Richard enrolled in law school, and the group went on hiatus. As of 2010, Richard was working as a lawyer in the music industry.

== Discography ==
- Pinetop Seven (Truckstop, 1997)
- Rigging the Toplights (Truckstop/Atavistic, 1998)
- No Breath in the Bellows EP (Truckstop/Atavistic, 1998)
- Bringing Home the Last Great Strike (Atavistic, 2000)
- Lest We Forget (2001)
- The Night's Bloom (Sky/Empyrean, 2005)
- Beneath Confederate Lake (Sky/Empyrean, 2006)
