= Poem Rocket =

American band

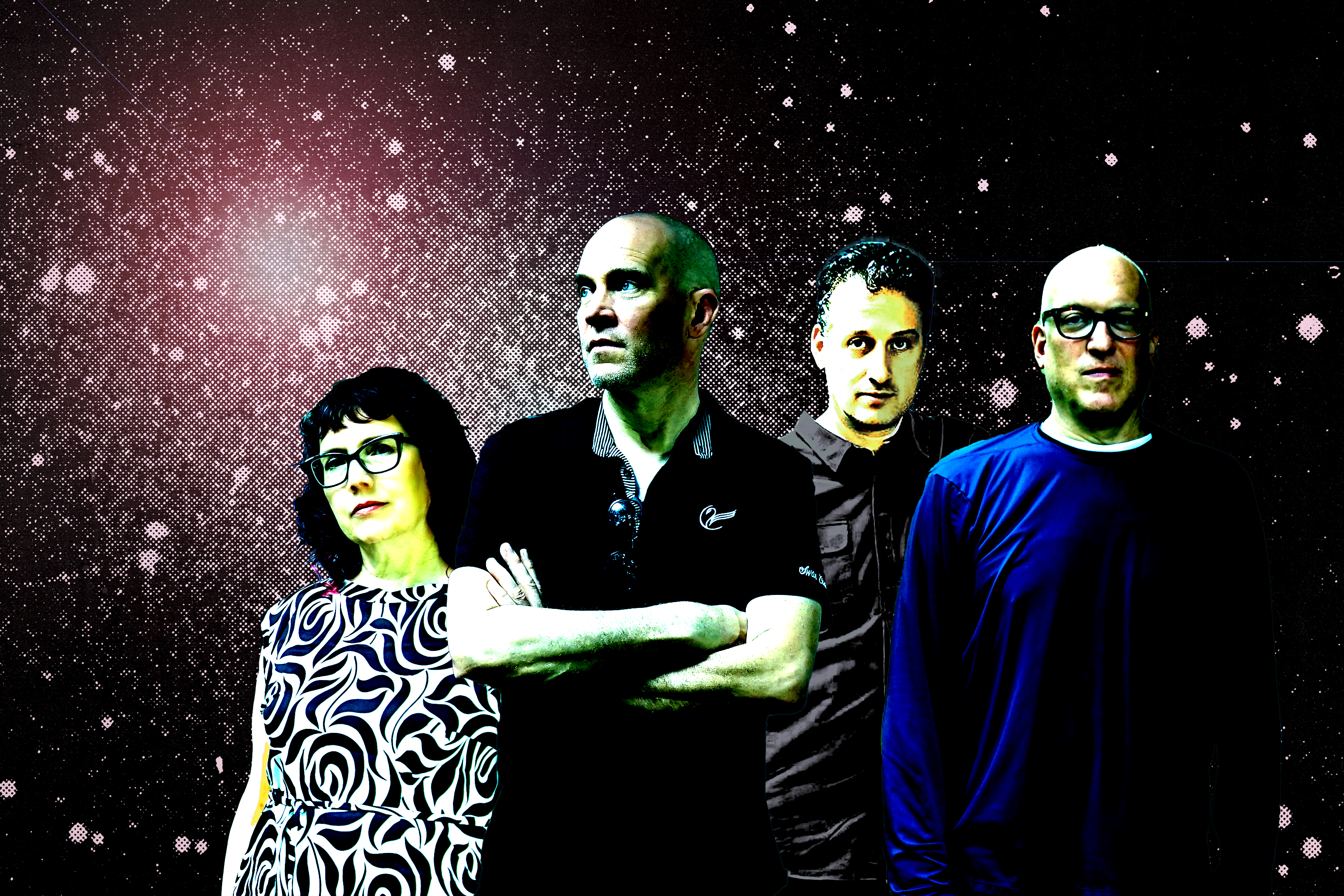
Poem Rocket Poem Rocket 2024: Sandra Gardner, Michael Peters, Peter Gordon, Mike Knowlton

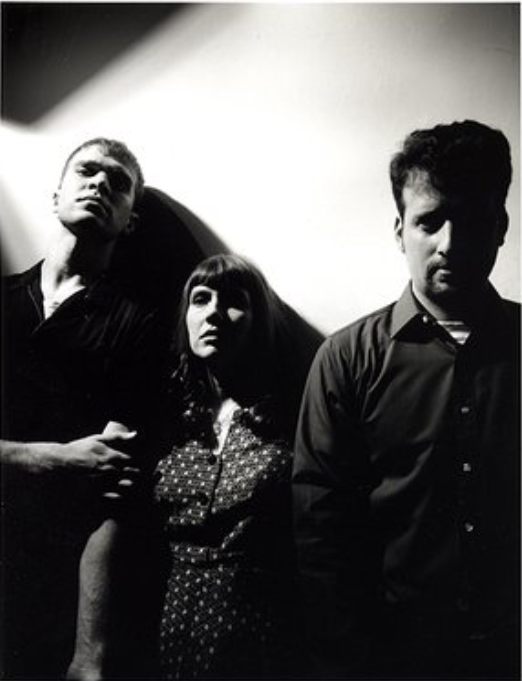
- Poem Rocket ca. 1998: L to R, Michael Peters, Sandra Gardner, and Peter Gordon

Background information
- Origin: New York City, New York, United States
- Genres: Art rock Post-punk; Noise Rock; Indie rock
- Instruments: Guitar, bass, drums, piano, tape loops
- Years active: 1992–present
- Labels: Atavistic; PCP/ Matador; Magic Eye/ Secret Eye; Bear Records; Silver Girl Records
- Members: Michael Peters (vocals, guitar); Sandra Gardner (vocals, bass guitar); Peter Gordon (drums); Mike Knowlton (guitar)
- Past members: Andrew Nelson (drums, 1993-1998); Dennis Bass (guitar, 1993 - 1996); William Shin (drums, 1993); Ian Christe (drums, 1993); Adam Cooke (drums, 2002)

Poem Rocket is an American experimental art rock/ noise rock band based currently in rural New York, originally hailing from New York City.

== Biography ==
Formed in 1992, the band currently consists of Michael Peters (vocals, guitar, songwriting), Sandra Gardner (vocals, bass, songwriting), Peter Gordon (drums), and Mike Knowlton (guitar). Peters and Gardner were married in 1997; they had a child in winter of 2003. Founding member Dennis Bass played guitar. A string of (often short-lived) drummers most notably included William Shin (Seam) and musician/author Ian Christe. Other drummers auditioned for the band, including author Paul Collins, who performed with the band in 1993 at CBGB. Drummer Andrew Nelson joined in late 1993, completing the early Poem Rocket sound.

The band started off by releasing a few 7" singles and a 10" EP; many songs from these were compiled on the Felix Culpa compilation CD in 1995. Proper debut album Infinite Retry On Parallel Time-out was recorded in 1996-1997 at The Funhouse with William Weber, and was mixed by Wharton Tiers; it was released in early 1998 by PCP Entertainment, a daughter label of Matador Records. After heavy touring in 1995-1996, Bass departed in late 1996, leaving the band as a three-piece. Nelson stayed until 1998, quitting shortly after throwing his drum kit into the audience at the end of a set in Atlanta, GA.

Peter Gordon of Gapeseed replaced Nelson on drums in early 1998. Gordon's bandmate and friend, Mike Knowlton (Gapeseed, Unlettered) occasionally played with the band on an instrument he coined a "b-uitar" (baritone guitar). Knowlton played on the "lost" EP. Poem Rocket began working with Atavistic Records, releasing the concept album psychogeography on Atavistic Records in 2000.

Sometime in the next few years (ca. 2002 or 2003), Adam Cooke of Baltimore rock band Roads To Space Travel briefly replaced Gordon on drums. In 2002, the band began work on a double album, titled Invasion! The album was completed in 2006 and released in 2007.

The "lost" EP, Lend-Lease, was recorded in 1999 at Six Finger Satellite's studio in Providence, RI, and is scheduled for release in late 2024 on Silver Girl Records. Peters is also a member of the experimental literary collective Be Blank Consort, and has been working on a biography of French architect Fleury Colon. As of 2007, Poem Rocket's full-length CDs remain in print, but their EPs have been out of print and scarce for years. Of their albums, only Felix Culpa has been re-released on vinyl, but it is an extended edition with extra songs included.

== Sound and influences ==
Poem Rocket, while in most respects a visceral rock band, draws upon a broad palette of influences, both musical and otherwise. Being originally immersed in the New York City music/art world exposed them to myriad creative stimuli. Rock influences include Throwing Muses, Suicide, Can, Live Skull, Bauhaus, The Church, Fugazi, Talking Heads, Pixies, The Ex, Band Of Susans and Gang Of Four. My Bloody Valentine, The Birthday Party, The Stooges, Slint, Unwound, and Siouxsie And The Banshees seem to have informed Poem Rocket's sound as well. Some less rock-music-based influences include the "guitar orchestras" of Rhys Chatham/Glenn Branca, ambient soundscapes of Brian Eno, and pulse compositions of Steve Reich.

They also draw from conceptual art, situationism, and varied literary inspirations. Their 2000 album was titled after Guy Debord's concept of Psychogeography, which is the study of how the geography and architecture of environments shape the behavior and thought processes of their inhabitants. Sample lyrics from "Reurbanization Of The Space" read, "Here is the new trend, examine the implications in the public and the private sectors... You're creating the mythology of the Great American City... The space around the buildings is the soul of the city." Peters generally sings a careening, animated, androgynous voice, while Gardner uses more of a controlled, breathy purr. Themes of existentialism, architecture, alienation, outer space, and biology crop up frequently, though the lyrics are open-ended enough to warrant multiple interpretations. Peters and Gardner can often be found harmonizing sweetly while atonal squalls of noise and throbbing basslines churn around them, leading to a disorienting, kinetic overall sound. Key examples of songs in this style include "Small White Animal," "Appeal To The Imagination," "Box: Tallow, Felt And Ice" and "Blue Chevy Impala." They have had a few acoustic numbers, such as "God Damn Alien Sundial" and the sexually-suggestive love ballad "Milky White Entropy." They have a song named after Dutch painter Karel Appel. Subdued travelogue "Budapest" features reversed cymbal and guitar loops. The twelve-minute "Levy 9 R.S.V.P." appears to be about the collision of comet Shoemaker-Levy 9 into Jupiter in 1994; the line "If it hits us, say I told you so/ No regrets" is repeated several times with increasing urgency. After an extended crescendo, it concludes with a whispered line about "fragmentary guests... deep in the dense layers of hydrogen." "Bataille" is apparently about controversial philosopher Georges Bataille.

== Touring ==
Poem Rocket's national (and/or international) touring history is uncertain, though they were known to play frequently around the New York City area in the 1990s at avant-garde music clubs such as The Knitting Factory and The Cooler, and CBGB's. They are known to have played live with Blastula, Wharton Tiers Ensemble, Mecca Normal, labelmates Slug (rock band, not rap group), Tono-Bungay, Bride Of No-No, Pilot To Gunner, Sweep the Leg Johnny, Royal Trux, and Hippopotamus. They are believed to have played live with their recording partners Six Finger Satellite.

== Discography ==
=== Albums ===
- Infinite Retry On Parallel Time-out CD (recorded in 1997) (PCP, 1998)
- psychogeography CD (Atavistic, 2000)
- Invasion! 2xCD (Atavistic, 2007) ["Ileah" mp3 excerpt:

=== EPs ===
- Into The Aether (a.k.a. "Blue Chevy Impala") 10" (Bear/ Carcrashh, 1995)
- The Universe Explained In Six Songs CD EP/ mini-album (in oversized clamshell case) (Secret Eye, 1999)
- Lend/Lease EP (recorded in 1999, planned release November 2024 on Silver Girl Records)

=== Singles ===
- "Period (punctuation or the amount of time required for a cyclic movement to occur)" b/w "Flaw" 7" (Bear, 1994)
- "Small White Animal" b/w "Milky White Entropy" 7" (PCP, 1995)
- "Desire Illuminated" b/w "Electronimo" 7" (Magic Eye Singles, 1997)

=== Compilation ===
- Felix Culpa CD (singles/ rarities compilation) (PCP, 1995)

=== Various-artist compilation tracks (ca. 1995-97) ===
- "Deus Absconditus," "The Animal Planter," "Begging To Please You," "Pretty Baby," "Return In Disarray" (never formally released; full mp3:, "The Path Of Coterminous Crescendoes"

=== Music videos ===
- "Small White Animal" (Directed by Poem Rocket and Peter Gordon) (MPG video excerpt:)
- "Box: Tallow, Felt, And Ice" (Directed by Elizabeth Bustamante; cinematography by Dave Anderson)
- "Ka-boom" (Directed by Poem Rocket and Peter Gordon) (MPG video excerpt:)
