= Souled American =

American alternative country band

- Origin: Chicago, Illinois, U.S.
- Genres: Roots rock, alternative country, Americana
- Years active: 1986–present
- Labels: Rough Trade, Tumult, Catamount, Omnivore Recordings
- Members: Joe Adducci; Chris Grigoroff
- Past members: Jamey Barnard; Scott Tuma
- Website: https://www.souledamerican.net/

Souled American is an American alternative country band from Chicago that was active mostly in the late 1980s and early 1990s. The band started in 1986 with a quartet of musicians from Illinois. The initial lineup consisted of rhythm guitar/singer Chris Grigoroff, bassist/singer Joe Adducci, lead guitarist Scott Tuma, and drummer Jamey Barnard. The band made six records between 1988 and 1995; Barnard left the group during the making of the fourth record Sonny, while Tuma departed during the making of the sixth record, Notes Campfire. Since then, Souled American has survived as a duo featuring the original songwriters Adducci and Grigoroff, aided and accompanied by a variety of other musicians.

In 2023, Grammy Award-winning musician Jeff Tweedy wrote about Souled American in his book, World Within a Song. Though Souled American, he explained, were contemporaries of his first band Uncle Tupelo, they never achieved widespread popularity; instead, as Uncle Tupelo shot to stardom in the burgeoning alternative country movement of the early 1990s, Souled American fell from sight. Consequently, Tweedy wrote, this Souled American song he was celebrating, "was likely the hardest track to find of any" he wrote about.

Nor was this Tweedy's first effort to bring attention to this forgotten band. In 2016, in a video for Pitchfork Magazine entitled, "The One Song I Wish I'd Written," Tweedy nominated Souled American's "Before Tonight."

In 2025, to rectify this imbalance, Omnivore Recordings issued Rise Above It, a compilation of twenty Souled American songs. In a highly-starred review published April 25, 2025, Jon Dale of Uncut pointed out how the band used country music as "the shell, of sorts, for a quixotic combination that pulled from all kinds of genres – the heartbreak and melodicism of country and folk; the groove of reggae and dub; and touches of R&B in some of the singing and playing, and in their choice of covers."

This followed an earlier attempt by tUMULt Records to revive interest through the 1999 reissue of their first four records in a remastered CD box set Framed, which inspired reviews and features in Rolling Stone, Pitchfork, and others.

Novelist/songwriter John Darnielle penned an essay ("How Souled American's Flubber Changed My Life") which underscored what songwriter/musician (Camper Van Beethoven/Cracker) David Lowery told a radio DJ in 1990 that "...in the way The Pixies sorta summed up all the sort of musical undercurrents in underground rock over the last ten years, Souled American did it for a different set of musical undercurrents (namely the American folk roots tradition). They took it and stood it on its head, in maybe the way Beefheart did, but in a more pop/folky way..."

== History ==
Mark Guarino, in his book Country & Midwestern, describes Chicago's developing music scene of the late 1980s that helped bring attention to this new style of roots music. "Souled American was likely playing Phyllis's Musical Inn, a corner dive on Division...[they were] drawn to the fatalism and soul of the early twentieth century string-band music." In 1988, they were signed by the newly-formed Rough Trade US, a division of Rough Trade Records, which released three Souled American records over the course of the next eighteen months: Fe (1988), Flubber (1989), and Around the Horn (1990). Rough Trade US folded soon after.

In 1992, Souled American recorded an album of American country covers called Sonny that was released only in Europe by Rough Trade Records.

The band re-emerged in 1994 with Frozen and 1996's Notes Campfire, both released on the small German label Moll Tonträger.

In 1997, guerrilla artist Camden Joy created a poster project with his best friend Mark Lerner which they called, "Fifty Posters About Souled American," consisting of typewritten comments and stories by various artists and musicians; Joy then plastered the posters around New York City.

In the 30 years following their 1996 release of Notes Campfire, the band released three songs. One was a cover of Kris Kristofferson's "Please Don't Tell Me How the Story Ends," on a 2002 tribute album. The second was "Ringside Suite," included on a 2006 compilation CD in issue No. 4 of Yeti magazine. The last was "Sorry State," released in 2024 via the group's Bandcamp page.

In early 2026, the band announced that Sanctions, their first album-length release of new material in 30 years, would be released April 17, 2026, on Jealous Butcher Records, with band members Joe Adducci and Chris Grigoroff writing, performing, and producing. The band also announced a set of US tour dates for spring and summer of 2026.

== Personnel ==
- Joe Adducci, bass, vocals
- Chris Grigoroff, guitar, vocals
- Scott Tuma, guitar (left the band in 1995)
- Jamey Barnard, drums (left the band in 1992)

== Discography ==
On Rough Trade Records

- 1988: Fe
- 1989: Flubber
- 1990: Around the Horn
- 1992: Sonny

On Moll Tonträger

- 1994: Frozen
- 1996: Notes Campfire

On tUMULt Records

- 1999: Framed – 4-CD re-issue of the first four albums

On Omnivore Recordings

- 2025: Rise Above It: A Souled American Anthology

On Jealous Butcher Records

- 2026: Sanctions

Compilation appearances

- 2002: "Please Don't Tell Me How the Story Ends" on "Nothing Left to Lose: A Tribute to Kris Kristofferson"
- 2006: "Ringside Suite" on the Yeti Magazine No. 4 compilation
