= Scott Tuma =

American musician and singer-songwriter

Scott Tuma is an American musician from Chicago who is best known for his live performances and also for having played guitar in the pioneering alt-country band Souled American. He was in Souled American from its foundation in 1986 until leaving in 1996, shortly before the release of their sixth album Notes Campfire. Afterwards, Tuma has performed and recorded with Chicago's Boxhead Ensemble, released numerous solo records, and collaborated with members of the band Zelienople (Mike Weis and Matt Christensen) in a project dubbed Good Stuff House.

Souled American's albums had gradually become more and more minimal over the years. Tuma's solo records also sound sparse, are influenced by folk and country, and are almost entirely instrumental, usually consisting of an acoustic guitar (whether layered or not); a harmonium (pump organ) has also been used.

== Discography ==
- 2001 Hard Again (Atavistic Records)
- 2003 The River 1 2 3 4 (Truckstop Records)
- 2008 Not For Nobody (Digitalis Recordings)
- 2009 Taradiddle with Mike Weis LP (Digitalis Recordings)
- 2010 Peeper/Love Songs Loud and Lonely - Split with Brothers Pus (Bathetic)
- 2010 Dandelion (Digitalis Recordings)
- 2014 "Hard Again / The River 1 2 3 4" (2xLP) (Scissor Tail Editions)
- 2014 'Cracker Where Am I' cassette (Bathetic - Dynasty at Ghost Town)
- 2015 'Eyrie' (Immune)
- 2016 "Ragged Hollow 12" Split w/ Nevada Greene" (Hitt Records)
- 2017 'No Greener Grass' 2xLP (Dismal Niche)
- 2022 'Nobody's Music' cassette/cd (haha.institute)
- 2023 'Gone to Turin' 12" Split w/ Loren Connors (A West Bound Brook) (Profane Illuminations)

=== With Souled American ===
- 1988 Fe (Rough Trade Records)
- 1988 Flubber (Rough Trade Records)
- 1990 Around the Horn (Rough Trade Records)
- 1992 Sonny (Rough Trade Records)
- 1994 Frozen (Moll Tonträger)
- 1996 Notes Campfire (Moll Tonträger)

=== With the Boxhead Ensemble ===
- 1998 The Last Place to Go (Atavistic Records)
- 2001 Two Brothers (Atavistic Records)
- 2003 Quartets (Atavistic Records)

=== With Good Stuff House ===
- 2006 Good Stuff House CD-R (Time-Lag Records)
- 2008 Endless Bummer (Root Strata)
- 2013 Untitled (Indian Queen Records)

=== Featured in film ===
- 2010 The Wolf Knife by Laurel Nakadate
- 2015 Felt by Jason Banker
- 2016 Incident Reports by Mike Hoolboom
- 2023 Ain't Got Time to Die by Marten Krafft
- 2023 Provo by Emma Thatcher

=== Other guest appearances ===
- 2000 Jack the Dog - "Missa Canibus" (set design, Orchard Records)
- 2002 Bevel - "Where Leaves Block the Sun" (harmonica, Jagjaguwar Records)
