= Camden Joy =

1990s guerrilla artist

- Born: Tom Adelman; 1964 (age 61–62); United States
- Occupations: Writer, musician

Camden Joy is the pseudonym of American writer and musician Tom Adelman. Joy is the author of six books—including The Last Rock Star Book or Liz Phair: A Rant and Lost Joy, a collection of stories, pamphlets, and posters.

In 1991, Adelman accompanied The David Lowery Band as they toured the country, first by Greyhound and later in the van as the band’s roadie. Adelman then spent several years researching David Lowery’s previous band, Camper Van Beethoven, interviewing band members, roadies, fans, producers, managers, videographers. Dissatisfied with the result, he started it over under the name Camden Joy. The result was a novel that included accounts of both The David Lowery Band’s road trip and Camper Van Beethoven’s break-up. Much later, in 2000, Harper Collins published the novel as Boy Island under its Quill imprint.

In 1994, Camden Joy wrote two tracts (“Lost Pamphlets”) entitled The Greatest Record Album Ever Told and The Greatest Record Album Singer That Ever Was.

Joy moved from Los Angeles to New York in 1995, and attained a brief notoriety for his New York City postering projects and street manifestos. The Lost Manifestoes of Camden Joy were wheat-pasted around Manhattan and Brooklyn throughout the last months of 1995. This Poster Will Not Never Change Your Life { was a multi-poster project in 1996, as was the collaborative Dear CMJ... Joy’s final act of street postering occurred in the summer of 1997 when he unveiled the collaborative Fifty Posters About Souled American.

Joy's essays, which were a combination of music criticism, memoir, and fiction, appeared in a number of periodicals, including the Village Voice, the Boston Phoenix, San Francisco Weekly, and McSweeney's and on This American Life.

After hearing Liz Phair’s Exile in Guyville in 1993, Joy wrote a novel, The Last Rock Star Book or Liz Phair: A Rant, in response. Verse Chorus Press published the novel in 1998.

In 2001, three new novellas by Joy were published by Highwater Books: Palm Tree 13, Pan, and Hubcap Diamondstar Halo. An excerpt of the latter appeared in “Best American Nonrequired Reading 2002” edited by Dave Eggers.

In 2002, Joy’s self-published tracts were collected as Lost Joy, which also contains short stories, record reviews, essays, and all of his NYC street posters. The book was published by Seattle's TNI Books.

== Retrospective ==
On November 8, 2013, Joy appeared as the President's Keynote Speaker at the 55th Annual Convention of the Midwest Modern Language Association in Milwaukee, Wisconsin. A roundtable on Joy's work was held the next day, entitled "Ode to Joy: The Career of Camden Joy." Participants included Samuel Cohen, Trinie Dalton, Ben Bush, David N. Meyer, and Adam Wilson. Each spoke to the value of Joy's (by now) largely-forgotten works. Earlier the same week, a panel discussion entitled "Majesty of Impulse: On the Great Lost Works of Camden Joy" occurred at Housing Works Bookstore in New York. Justin Taylor joined the discussion along with many of the Milwaukee participants, each explaining how they first discovered Joy's works.

== Reissues ==
On July 14, 2015, Verse Chorus Press of Portland, Oregon, brought "Lost Joy" back into print. Featuring an introduction by Jonathan Lethem, a foreword by Dennis Cooper, and blurbs from Dave Eggers and Ira Glass, with a new cover designed by Mark Lerner at Rag & Bone Shop.

== Recordings ==
On October 28, 2013, Camden Joy appeared as a live guest on the Airborne Event radio show on WFMU. He spoke with host Dan Bodah and performed several songs in advance of his Housing Works and MLA retrospectives. The recordings of the session are available in the WFMU archives and at the Free Music Archive

On October 1, 2015, Camden Joy released a dozen original songs called "Hasta La Bye Bye." Joy recorded these songs with his friends under the name The Oswalds, reviving a band that had not played together since the late eighties. Critic John Burdick called it, "noisy, skittish, comic and profoundly imaginative."

Between January 1, 2020, and March 4, 2022, Camden Joy released forty-eight songs. He wrote and produced all. The first batch "Updated Just Now" was released on New Year’s Day, 2020. The Addison Independent said, “[it] evokes a sort of revolution-inspired passion with an overlay of more experimental indie-rock. Think Bob Dylan meets Pavement.” The songs elsewhere earned praise for their “poignant lyrics and powerful imagery.”

The second batch “American Love” was released on the Fourth of July, 2020.

The third and fourth batches “rerouting…” and “roaming on” were released on the Fourth of March, 2022. A music journalist in Burlington, Vermont called “rerouting…” a "hot and tangled mess of lo-fi primitivism, joyfully juvenile catharsis and deep, abiding sorrow.” A cultural critic in the weekly "Seven Days" described “roaming on” as “a record that plays out like a jumbled slice-of-life document, full of surprise and charm."

Joy has been licensed to perform in Burlington’s Church Street Marketplace and frequently busks there.

== Souled American ==
In 2023, Camden Joy became involved with Souled American as their manager. In the spring of 2025, he published a book about their debut Fe (Souled American album) entitled "35 Days of Fe."

== Publications ==
- Joy, Camden (1995). The greatest record album ever told. Phoenicia, New York: Rag & Bone Shop. ASIN B0006QZLZM.
- Joy, Camden (1998). The last rock star book, or Liz Phair, a rant (1st ed.). Portland, OR: Verse Chorus Press. ISBN 978-1891241079.
- Joy, Camden (2002). Lost Joy. Seattle, WA: TNI Books. ISBN 978-0967870328.
- Joy, Camden (1995). The Lost Manifestoes of Camden Joy. New York: C. Joy.
- Joy, Camden (2002). Lost Joy. Seattle, WA: TNI Books. ISBN 978-0967870328.
- Joy, Camden (2001). Palm Tree 13. Cambridge, MA: Highwater Books. ISBN 978-0970085887.
- Joy, Camden; Morton, Colin B. (2001). Pan : a novella. Cambridge, MA: Highwater Books. ISBN 978-0970085870.
- Joy, Camden (2001). Hubcap Diamondstar Halo. Cambridge, MA: Highwater Books. ISBN 978-0970085894.
- Joy, Camden (2000). Boy island : a novel (1st ed.). New York: Quill. ISBN 978-0688170332.
- Joy, Camden; et al. (1997). MAKE ME LAUGH, MAKE ME CRY: 50 Posters About Souled American. Phoenicia, New York: Rag & Bone Shop.
- Joy, Camden (2025) 35 Days of Fe. Seaside, CA: C. Joy.
- Joy, Camden (2025) Unforgetting Flubber: The Making of an Unremembered Classic by an Unremembered Band. Self-published.
