= Around the Horn (album) =

Studio album by Souled American
- Released: 1990
- Genre: Americana
- Length: 40:43
- Label: Rough Trade
- Producer: Souled American, Jeff Hamand, Brian Deck

Souled American chronology
Flubber (1989)	Around the Horn (1990)	Sonny (1992)

Around the Horn is the third album by the Chicago-based band Souled American. It was released in 1990 by Rough Trade US, a subsidiary of Rough Trade Records, shortly before the label went into receivership. The band supported the album by touring with Camper Van Beethoven.

The album was re-released, as part of the Framed box set, by tUMULt Records in 1999.

== Production ==
The band recorded the album quickly, as they thought that Rough Trade may close. The album title refers to the band's desire to use guitars to reproduce the feel of marching band horn lines. "I Keep Holding Back the Tears" was written by bassist Joe Adducci's mother. "Durante's Hornpipe" is a version of the traditional instrumental.

== Critical reception ==
Professional ratings
Review scores
Source	Rating
AllMusic	4/5 stars
Entertainment Weekly	B+

The Chicago Tribune wrote that "Souled American's music seems to spring from familiar folk, country and old-time acoustic blues roots, but the forms are odd and warped, slow and quavery." The Washington Post advised: "Imagine hearing a recording of Neil Young's whiny tenor playing at the wrong speed, revolving at the dreariest pace, accompanied by amateurish guitars, an occasional trombone and muted bass and drums." Entertainment Weekly stated that Souled American's music "is irresistibly deadpan, sounding not at all inept, but simply homemade... Maybe they're telling us that traditional country life has now declined into something threadbare and dim."

As Mark Guarino wrote in his book Country & Midwestern, with this album, "Souled American served as a brief pivot point that foreshadowed trance-root artists like Richard Buckner, Sun Kil Moon, and Will Oldham. As alternative country gained more traction, the band itself faded..."

According to AllMusic: "Around the Horn shows the band now fully master of a unique kind of Americana, here much more melancholy and gently downbeat than ever before, guitars more apt to ring softly or solitarily than anything else. The dub and r'n'b touches prevalent on the first two albums aren't as apparent here, but what the band loses in relative breadth it more than makes up for in atmosphere."

== Track listing ==
1. "Around the Horn" – 3:43
2. "Second of All" – 4:01
3. "Old, Old House" – 3:31
4. "Durante's Hornpipe" – 2:02
5. "Rise Above It" – 6:10
6. "Six Feet of Snow" – 4:18
7. "Willdawg" – 3:23
8. "I Keep Holding Back the Tears" – 4:26
9. "You" – 4:11
10. "Luggy Di" – 2:39
11. "In the Mud" – 2:19

All songs by Souled American except "Old, Old House" by George Jones, "Six Feet of Snow" by Little Feat, "Durante's Hornpipe" (traditional), and "I Keep Holding Back the Tears" by bassist Joe Adducci's mother.

== Personnel ==
- Joe Adducci – bass, vocals
- Jamey Barnard – drums
- Chris Grigoroff – guitar, vocals
- Scott Tuma – guitar
- Jaimo (Jaimo Ferrone) - trombone on "Second of All"
