= Philip Ettinger =

American actor (born 1985)

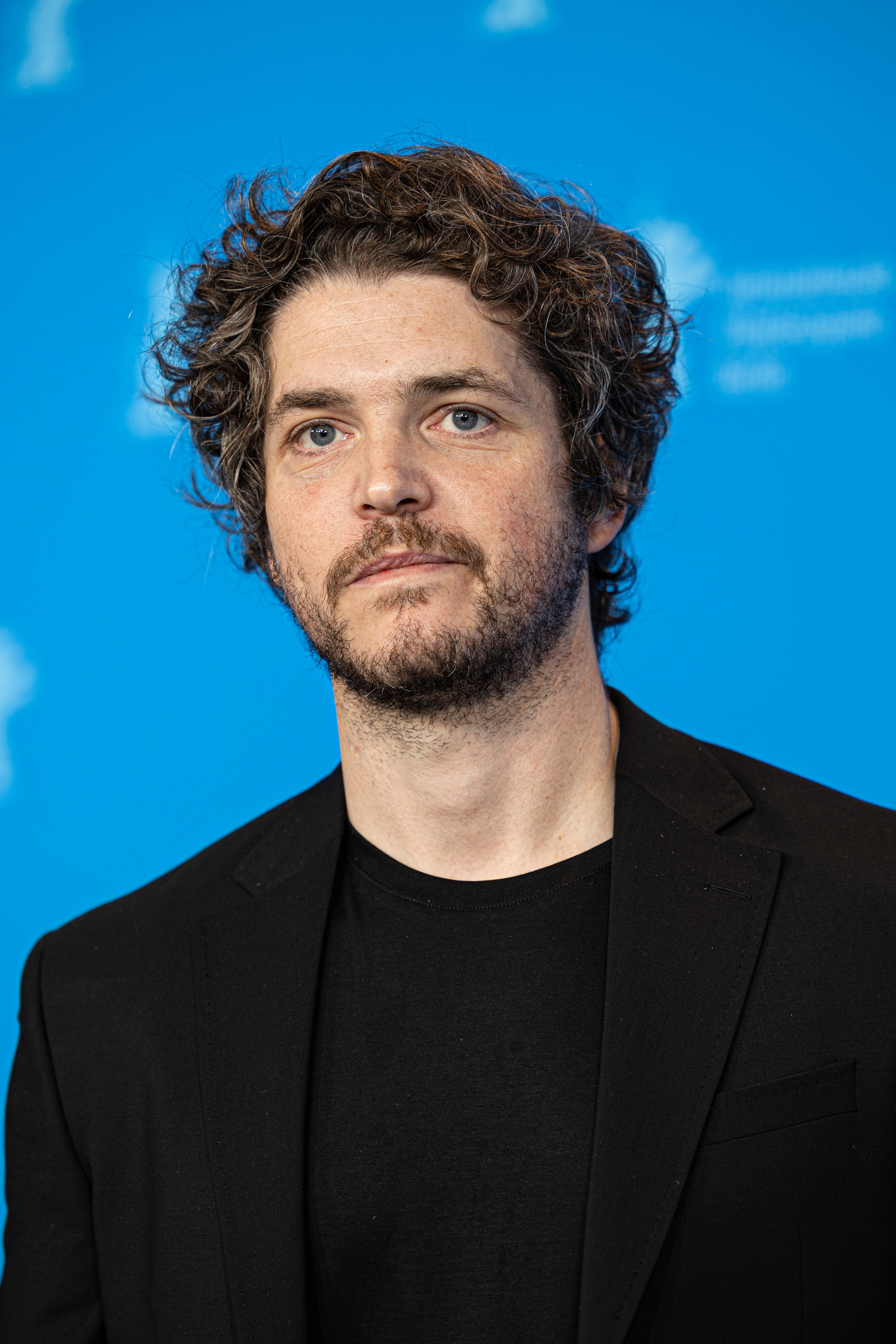
- Ettinger at the Berlin Film Festival 2023
- Born: September 8, 1985 (age 41); Fair Lawn, New Jersey, U.S.
- Occupation: Actor
- Years active: 2008–present

Philip Ettinger (born September 8, 1985) is an American actor. He first gained attention for his supporting role as the troubled environmental activist, Michael, in Paul Schrader's First Reformed (2017). Other significant roles have been as Garrett Drimmer in the CBS All Access series One Dollar (2018), as the young-adult version of Mark Ruffalo's twin characters, Dominick and Thomas Birdsey, in HBO's I Know This Much Is True in 2020, and in the lead role of Cole Freeman in Braden King's cinematic adaptation of the Carter Sickels' novel The Evening Hour (2020).

== Early life ==
Philip Ettinger was born September 8, 1985 to a Jewish family in Fair Lawn, New Jersey. He attended Fair Lawn High School, where he was a member of the Masques drama club. He began studying film directing at Emerson College in Boston, Massachusetts. After unexpectedly winning the lead role in a play his freshman year, however, he enrolled in a summer acting program at William Esper Studio in New York City, where a teacher encouraged Ettinger to transfer to the Mason Gross School of the Arts at Rutgers University in New Brunswick, New Jersey. This course included spending a year in England studying at the Globe Theatre in London. He graduated with a Bachelor of Fine Arts degree.

== Career ==
Ettinger's professional career began in 2008 in an episode of Law & Order: Special Victims Unit.

In 2014, Ettinger was nominated for a Lucille Lortel Award for Outstanding Featured Actor in a Play, for his work in Joshua Harmon's Bad Jews. (The awards are to recognize excellence in New York Off-Broadway Theatre). Ettinger starred alongside Ethan Hawke and Amanda Seyfried in the supporting role of Michael, the troubled husband of Seyfried's character, Mary, in Paul Schrader's film First Reformed, which was premiered at the 2017 Toronto Film Festival. The performance was a breakthrough for the actor; so much so, that the Los Angeles Times film critic, Justin Chang stated in an article regarding his personal choices for what should land on the 2018 Oscar nomination ballot, "When lead performances sneak into the wrong categories, it makes it all the harder for an organization to recognize a genuinely supporting turn — like, for example, Ettinger's galvanizing work in First Reformed, which lasts all of one scene and continues to stay with me.." Ettinger continued to make strides in 2018, starring as Garrett Drimmer, a young steel mill worker raising a toddler on his own, in the CBS All Access ensemble series One Dollar, and appearing in the Sebastián Silva-directed film Tyrel, which premiered at the 2018 Sundance Film Festival.

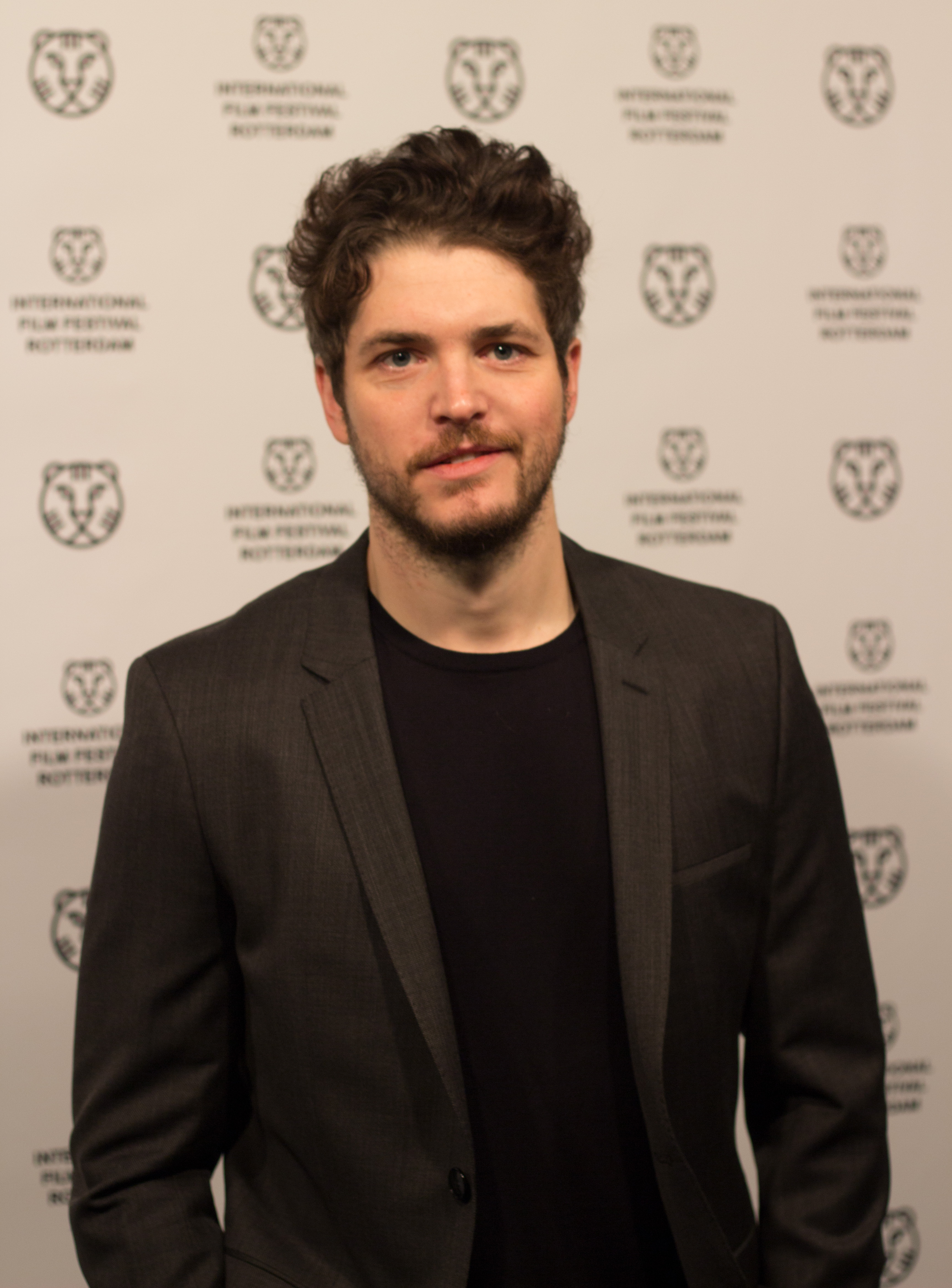
Ettinger at the 2020 International Film Festival Rotterdam

In 2020, Ettinger landed the role of playing the 17–19-year-old versions of Mark Ruffalo's twin characters, Dominick Birdsey and his paranoid schizophrenic twin, Thomas, in HBO's I Know This Much Is True. This brought him considerable critical notice, with Dan Seddon of NME noting, "Actor Philip Ettinger (among the series' supporting players) makes a case for himself too, whose stint as the college-aged twins during flashbacks is a raw and fascinating portrayal of the Birdseys complicated youth." Vanity Fair's Richard Lawson examined Ettinger and star Ruffalo's collaboration on the twins with favor, "The relationship between Dom and Thomas is drawn with aching clarity, one brother trying to be good to the other while resentments build up around them. Crucially, neither Ruffalo nor Ettinger overplay Thomas's condition. Though he is volatile, and frustrating, and wounded, there is nothing childlike about him, really—at least not in the style of so many misbegotten depictions of mental illness on screen... In the other role, Ruffalo and Ettinger both keenly express Dom's agony over his assumed responsibilities and all they deny him in his own life. It's particularly heartbreaking to watch Ettinger's youthful appetite for escape dissipate as he realizes just how serious his brother's situation is, how much time and attention and patience it will require. I Know This Much Is True is wise enough to both regret and accept that onus, gradually allowing Dom to find the ragged purpose in a life he feels has been robbed of that very thing. Ruffalo communicates that hopeful resignation quite well, building on Ettinger's more wide-eyed performance to craft a man in full." Haaretz's Adrian Hennigan pointed out Ettinger's success in portraying both twins, "The actors (including Donnie and Rocco Masihi) playing the younger versions of the twins are also outstanding: Philip Ettinger subtly delineates how these identical twins are very different characters..."

Earlier that year Ettinger attended both the 2020 Sundance Film Festival and the International Film Festival Rotterdam in the Netherlands to promote his first lead role as Cole Freeman in Braden King's cinematic adaptation of the Carter Sickels novel The Evening Hour. In it, Ettinger depicts a young nursing home aide struggling to support himself, and his grandparents, in economically depressed Appalachia, by buying excess pain meds from members of his West Virginian community, and reselling them to others in that same area. The film was released in 2021. Other projects include Ian Barling's 2021 short film Safe, which premiered at La Semaine de la Critique at Cannes in July 2021, Hold Up in 2022 by writer-director Alex Rollins Berg, and Little Brother, an indie film written and directed by Sheridan O'Donnell. Ettinger also stars alongside Emmy-winner Martha Plimpton in Sardinia, a 2024 short film written and directed by Paul Kowalski and Executive Produced by Patton Oswalt. The film is about a serious man trying to avoid catching a deadly laughing plague in a growingly polarized and dystopian society, and was named a 2025 Oscar contender for Best Live Action Short by Deadline.

== Filmography ==
=== Film ===
Key
†	Denotes films that have not yet been released

Year	Title	Role	Notes
2010	Twelve	Hunter McCulloch	
2011	The Brooklyn Brothers Beat the Best	John John	
2012	Compliance	Kevin	
2012	Sleepwalk with Me	Doug	
2013	The Maid's Room	Brandon Crawford	
2014	Chu and Blossom	Donnie	
2015	Anesthesia	Roger	
2016	Indignation	Ron Foxman	
2016	Last Call	Alexi	
2017	One Percent More Humid	Billy	
2017	The Pirates of Somalia	Alex	
2017	First Reformed	Michael Mensana	
2017	Brawl in Cell Block 99	Derrick	
2017	November Criminals	Mike Lorriner	
2018	Tyrel	Charles	
2019	The Undiscovered Country	Richie	
2020	The Evening Hour	Cole Freeman	
2020	Viena and the Fantomes	Boyer	
2021	Safe	Danny	Short film
2022	Hold Up	Graham	Short film
2022	Every Last Secret	Cabbot	
2023	Manodrome	Jason	
2023	Little Brother	Pete	
2023	Wildcat	Cal Lowell	
2024	My First Film	Dustin	
2024	Sardinia	Ryszard Przybyszewski	Short film
2025	After This Death	Ronnie	
2026	Josephine	Greg	
TBA	Triumph of the Will †	TBA	Post-production

=== Television ===
Key
†	Denotes television productions that have not yet been released

Year	Title	Role	Notes
2008	Law & Order: Special Victims Unit	Alec Bernardi	Episode: "Babes"
2009	The Closer	Jake Burrell	Episode: "Maternal Instincts"
2010	Mercy	Nathan	Episode: "We're All Adults"
2011	Blue Bloods	John John	Episode: "Innocence"
2012	Girls	Zach	Episode: "The Return"
2013	The Good Wife	Michael	Episode: "A Precious Commodity"
2014	Manhattan	Watts	Episode: "Last Reasoning of Kings"
2016	Elementary	Toby Dannon	Episode: "Down Where the Dead Delight"
2017	The Mist	Nash	2 episodes
2017	Chicago Med	Eric Adams	Episode: "Trust Your Gut"
2018	One Dollar	Garrett Drimmer	10 episodes
2020	I Know This Much Is True	Young Dominick and Thomas Birdsey	2 episodes
2021	Cinema Toast	Man (voice)	Episode: "Warehouse Friends"
2022	Angelyne	Cory Hunt	3 episodes
2022	A Friend of the Family	Joe Berchtold	Miniseries
2023	Bupkis	Evan	7 episodes
2025	Happy Face	Shane Jesperson	2 episodes
2026	The Terror: Devil in Silver	'Louie'	2 episodes
TBA	Seven Sisters †	TBA	Main role

=== Theatre ===
Year	Title	Role	Venue	Notes
2010	Edgewise	Ruckus	Walkerspace	
2012-2013	Bad Jews	Jonah Haber	Roundabout Theatre Company	

== Awards and nominations ==
Year	Award	Category	Nominated work	Result	Ref.
2015	Lucille Lortel Award	Outstanding Featured Actor in a Play	Bad Jews	Nominated	
2023	Soho International Film Festival	Best Acting Performance in a Leading Role – US Feature	Little Brother	Winner	
