= Boxhead Ensemble =

American musical group

- Origin: Los Angeles, California, United States
- Genres: Post-rock, ambient, chamber music
- Years active: 1991–present
- Label: Dark Companion
- Members: Jim Becker; Shahzad Ismaily; Michael Krassner; Fred Lonberg-Holm; Tim Rutili; Jim White; Joshua Hill
- Past members: Jessica Billey; Michael Colligan; David Michael Curry; Joe Ferguson; David Grubbs; Ryan Hembrey; Jacob Kollar; Glenn Kotche; Charles Kim; Doug McCombs; Jim O'Rourke; Will Oldham; Julie Pomerleau; Darren Richard; Frank Rosaly; Scott Tuma; Mick Turner; Ken Vandermark

Boxhead Ensemble is a musical collective founded by composer Michael Krassner. The project began in 1991 to record music for the independent film The Original Pantry Café. The group features an ever rotating line-up, which as included Edith Frost, David Grubbs, Glenn Kotche, Fred Lonberg-Holm, Jim O'Rourke, Doug McCombs, Scott Tuma, Mick Turner, Ken Vandermark, Jim White. Krassner is the only consistent member and Lonberg-Holm has contributed the most frequently to the project.

== History ==
Boxhead Ensemble was formed Los Angeles, California, in 1991 when Michael Krassner was commissioned by Braden King and Larry Stuckey to record the music for their independent student documentary The Original Pantry Café. Krassner assembled local musicians who improvised the music comprising the score. In 1996, King invited Krassner to create the music for another documentary he had filmed, Dutch Harbor. Having moved to Chicago, Krassner became familiar with the local music and decided that Gastr del Sol would fit with the mood he was looking to create with the music. Reed player Ken Vandermark joined the group and the improvised score was released in 1997 as Dutch Harbor – Where the Sea Breaks Its Back. The film and its soundtrack received some acclaim and Dutch Harbor began touring Europe, with Boxhead Ensemble providing improvised musical accompaniment to every screening of the film. Some of the music performed at the showings appeared in The Last Place to Go, released in 1998.

After the tour of Dutch Harbor, Krassner drastically altered the line-up of the group and Boxhead Ensemble started recording studio albums. They produced Two Brothers in 2001, Quartets in 2003 and Nocturnes in 2006.

In 2010, Boxhead Ensemble composed the soundtrack to Braden King's feature-length dramatic film Here. The group also performed for the movie's premier at the Museum of Modern Art, where they improvised the score while screening the film. In the last year Krassner joined italian avant-garde label Dark Companion and played gigs as Boxhead Ensemble including Lino Capra Vaccina and Annie Barbazza.

== Discography ==
- Dutch Harbor – Where the Sea Breaks Its Back (1997)
- The Last Place to Go (1998)
- Two Brothers (2001)
- Quartets (2003)
- Nocturnes (2006)
- The Unseen Hand: Music for Documentary Film (2014)
- La Hora Magica (2015)
- Here: Chicago Sessions (2017)
- Ancient Music (2023)
- Armenia (2024)
- Feather and Pine (2025)
