= Stacy Martin =

French actress (born 1990)

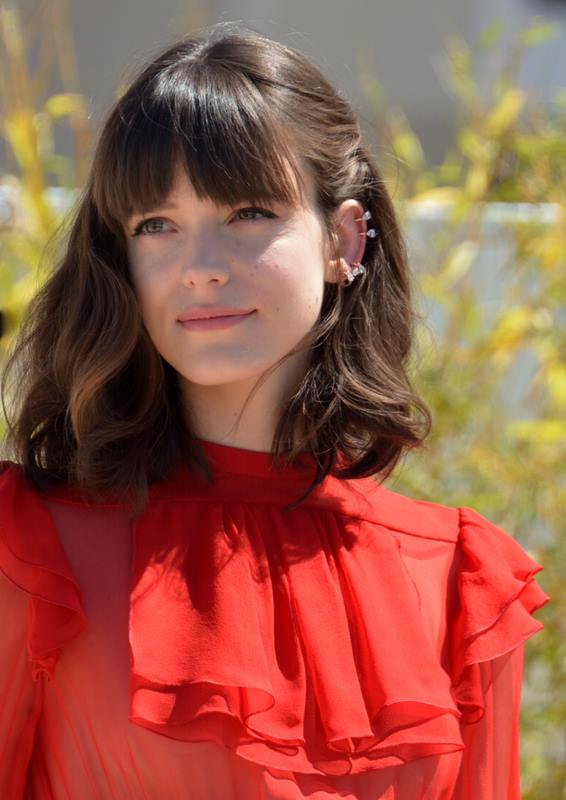
- Martin at the 2017 Cannes Film Festival
- Born: 20 March 1990 (age 36); Paris, France
- Occupation: Actress
- Years active: 2013–present

Stacy Martin (born 20 March 1990) is a French actress. Following her film debut in Nymphomaniac (2013), Martin had lead roles in films such as Redoubtable (2017), Amanda (2018), The Evening Hour, and Lovers (both 2020), as well as supporting roles in High-Rise (2015), All the Money in the World (2017), The Night House (2020), and The Testament of Ann Lee (2025).

She is a frequent collaborator with Brady Corbet, having appeared in his films The Childhood of a Leader (2015), Vox Lux (2018), and The Brutalist (2024). Martin is also known for her supporting role as Juliette Voclain on the BBC One crime drama miniseries The Serpent (2021).

== Early life ==
Martin was born in Paris, where she spent her early childhood. She moved to Tokyo when she was seven, where she lived with her French father, René Martin, a hairstylist, and her English mother, Annette, until she was thirteen. She then returned to Paris. After finishing school, she moved to London to study Media and Cultural Studies at the University of the Arts London's College of Communication whilst modeling on the side. She studied the Meisner technique of acting at the Actors' Temple.

== Career ==
In 2013, Martin starred as Young Joe aged 15 to 31, in the drama film Nymphomaniac. For her role in the film, which featured unsimulated sex, Martin had a "porn double" and used a prosthetic vagina. The role earned her nominations for Best Actress from two Danish organizations, the Robert Awards and the Bodil Awards. She was also a part of the Breakthrough Brits of 2014 which was organized by BAFTA to recognize emerging talents. She played Faye in the 2015 film High-Rise and Young Dora in Tale of Tales, also in 2015.

As a model, Martin was part of the Rag & Bone Spring 2014 campaign and the Miu Miu 2014 and 2015 Fall/Winter campaigns, and served as the face of Miu Miu's first fragrance.

== Filmography ==
=== Film ===
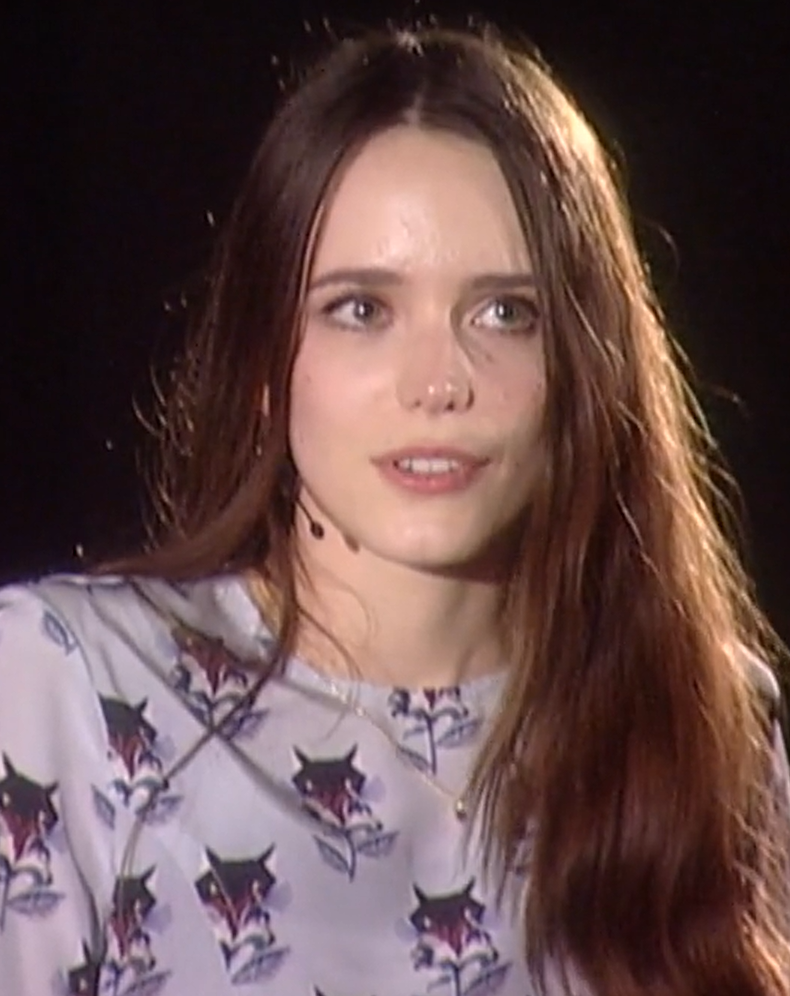
Stacy Martin at Nymphomaniac One Night Stand Q&A in 2014

Key
†	Denotes films that have not yet been released

Year	Title	Role	Notes
2013	Nymphomaniac	Young Joe	Film debut role
2015	Tale of Tales	Young Dora	
2015	Subjective Reality	Model	Short film
2015	The Lady in the Car with Glasses and a Gun	Anita Caravaille	
2015	The Childhood of a Leader	The Teacher	
2015	Taj Mahal	Louise	
2015	High-Rise	Fay	
2015	Winter	Sophie	
2017	The Last Photograph	Bird	
2017	Redoubtable	Anne Wiazemsky	
2017	All the Money in the World	J. Paul Getty's assistant	
2018	Treat Me Like Fire	Ella	
2018	Rosy	Rosy	
2018	Leading Lady Parts	Herself	Short film
2018	Amanda	Léna	
2018	Vox Lux	Eleanor	
2019	Casanova, Last Love	Marianne de Charpillon	
2020	The Night House	Madelyne	
2020	The Evening Hour	Charlotte Carson	
2020	Archive	Jules Almore J3 J2 (voice)	
2020	Lovers	Lisa Redler	
2021	The Electrical Life of Louis Wain	Felicie Wain	
2024	The Brutalist	Maggie Van Buren	
2025	Islands	Anne	
2025	The Testament of Ann Lee	Jane Wardley	
2026	Sense and Sensibility	Fanny Dashwood	
TBA	The Queen of Fashion †	Daphne Guinness	Post-production
TBA	Eleven Missing Days †		Filming

=== Television ===
Year	Title	Role	Notes
2021	The Serpent	Juliette Voclain	Limited series

== Awards and nominations ==
Year	Award	Title	Result
2014	Bodil Award for Best Actress in a Leading Role	Nymphomaniac	Nominated
2015	Robert Award for Best Actress in a Supporting Role	Nymphomaniac: Director's Cut	Nominated
