= Michael Krassner =

American musician (born 1971)

- Born: 1971 (age 53–54); Wisconsin, U.S.
- Genres: Post-rock, folk
- Occupation: Musician
- Instrument(s): Vocals, guitar, keyboards
- Years active: 1991–present
- Labels: Atavistic

Michael Krassner (born 1971) is an American musician and composer, known for his work in the Boxhead Ensemble and The Lofty Pillars. He has collaborated with numerous musical artists, including Califone, Dirty Three, Gastr del Sol, Fred Lonberg-Holm, Will Oldham, Scott Tuma and Ken Vandermark.

== Biography ==
Michael Krassner grew up in Wisconsin and moved to Arizona when he was a teenager. He began writing music at the age of fourteen after hearing The Velvet Underground. In 1991, Krasner formed the Boxhead Ensemble in Los Angeles to record a soundtrack for Braden King. After relocating to Chicago, the ensemble comprised Charles Kim, Ken Vandermark and members of the post-rock group Gastr del Sol. Under his direction, the group recorded the soundtrack for the film Dutch Harbor. The line-up for the group has constantly changed, with Krassner being the only consist member. After the release of his debut solo album in 1999, Krassner formed The Lofty Pillars with singer-songwriter Wil Hendricks, with whom he had been writing songs since 1993.

== Discography ==
- Michael Krassner (1999)
