= Atavistic Records =

American record label

- Founded: 1985
- Founder: Kurt Kellison
- Genre: Rock, avant-garde, jazz
- Country of origin: U.S.
- Location: Chicago, Illinois
- Official website: www.atavistic.com

Atavistic Records is an American record label based in Chicago, Illinois, known for its no wave and free jazz recordings.

Atavistic has released albums by Glenn Branca, Nels Cline, Lydia Lunch, Peter Brötzmann, Ken Vandermark, Pinetop Seven, Swans, Elliott Sharp, Larry Ochs, Mars, Davey Williams, Brian Harnetty, Zeena Parkins, and Poem Rocket, among others. The label was founded in Columbus, Ohio in 1985 by Kurt Kellison as a video label producing live VHS recordings by bands such as Live Skull and The Flaming Lips. The label was relocated when Kellison moved to Chicago in 1988.

Atavistic's Unheard Music Series imprint focuses on the reissuing of out-of-print free improvisation/ avant-garde jazz recordings.

== See also ==
- List of record labels
