= Paul Kowalski =

Polish-British film director and screenwriter (born 1981)

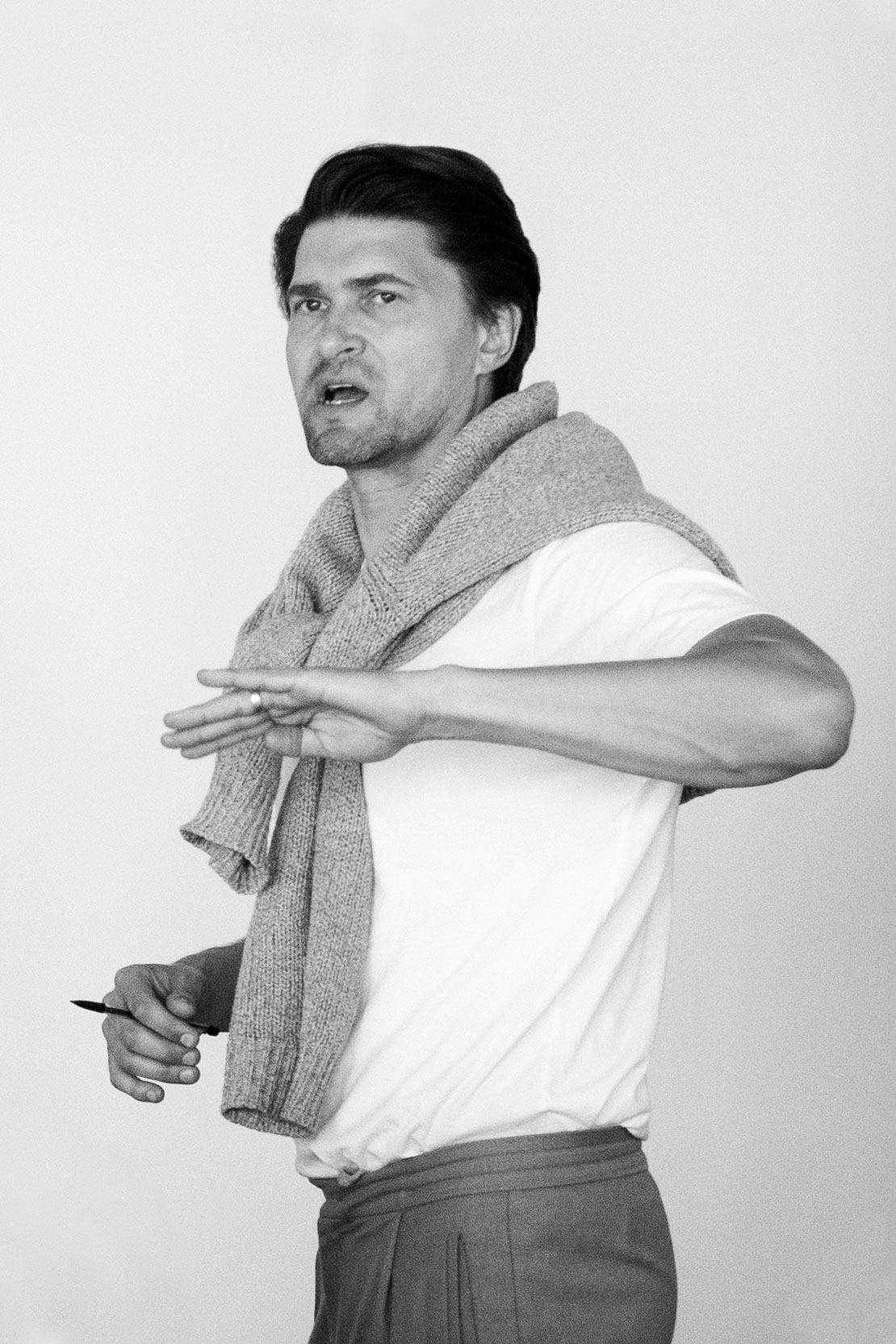
- Born: Paul John Kowalski; 13 May 1981 (age 45); Epsom, Surrey, England
- Education: Brown University; AFI Conservatory
- Occupations: Film Director; Screenwriter
- Spouse: Sorel Carradine (m. 2018)
- Children: 1

Paul Kowalski (born 13 May 1981) is a Polish-British film director and screenwriter based in Los Angeles.

== Early life ==
Kowalski was born in Epsom, England to Polish immigrants and raised in North Africa, England, the Middle East, Southeast Asia, Poland and across the USA. While living in Riyadh, Saudi Arabia in the early 1990s, he worked as an actor for a children's program on English-language channel Saudi TV-2.

Kowalski studied literature and writing at Brown University, where he also made his earliest films. He later received his MFA in film directing at the AFI Conservatory.

== Career ==
Kowalski's films center around identity, exile and obsession, often featuring dark psychologies and the supernatural. As a film director and screenwriter, he has won recognition from the American Society of Cinematographers, Austin Film Festival, Rhode Island International Film Festival, Indy Shorts International Film Festival, Beijing Film Academy, CINE, Aesthetica Short Film Festival, Raindance Film Festival, deadCENTER Film Festival, Cinequest Film & Creativity Festival and Beverly Hills Film Festival, among others.

His debut feature Paper Tiger premiered at Austin Film Festival in 2020, winning the Audience Award and a Jury mention. The film was sold by The Gersh Agency and distributed by Gravitas Ventures. In 2021, Kowalski was named one of “25 Screenwriters To Watch” by Austin Film Festival.

His film Sardinia was long-listed for the 2025 Best Live Action Short Oscar. Deadline named it a front-runner in November 2024, with Executive Producer Patton Oswalt calling it "an effortlessly original piece of work" and "beyond timely”. Sardinia follows a serious man trying to avoid catching a deadly laughing plague in a growingly polarized and dystopian society; it stars Philip Ettinger, Emmy-winner Martha Plimpton, Olek Krupa and Breeda Wool. Kowalski won Grand Prize Best Director at the Rhode Island International Film Festival, and was nominated for Best Short in 2025 at both Raindance Film Festival and Aesthetica Short Film Festival for the film, which Omeleto praised as “beautifully crafted, intellectually irreverent and thought-provoking", likening it to "a modern Kafka fable for our times”.

== Personal ==
Kowalski is married to actress Sorel Carradine.

His uncle, Lech Kowalski, directed punk rock documentary, D.O.A.: A Rite of Passage, and East of Paradise which won at the Venice Film Festival. The film is about Paul Kowalski's grandmother's escape from a Soviet workcamp during World War II.
