= Paper Tiger (2020 film) =

- Official Poster
- Directed by: Paul Kowalski
- Written by: Paul Kowalski
- Produced by: Pin-Chun Liu; Bonnie Buckner; Paul Kowalski
- Starring: Lydia Look; Alan Trong; Elaine Kao; Seth Numrich; John Harlan Kim; Lynn Chen; Carrie Wampler
- Cinematography: Ed Wu
- Edited by: Steven Wang
- Music by: Lucas Lechowski
- Production company: XRM Media
- Distributed by: Gravitas Ventures
- Release dates: October 23, 2020 (Austin Film Festival); August 24, 2021
- Running time: 94 minutes
- Country: United States
- Language: English

Paper Tiger is a 2020 American drama thriller film written and directed by Paul Kowalski.

The film world premiered at the 2020 Austin Film Festival. It was subsequently sold by The Gersh Agency, and was released on August 24, 2021, by Gravitas Ventures.

== Cast ==
- Lydia Look as Lily
- Alan Trong as Edward
- Elaine Kao as Mei
- Seth Numrich as JT
- John Harlan Kim as Kevin
- Lynn Chen as Ms. Li
- Carrie Wampler as Jessica

== Release ==
After premiering at Austin Film Festival on October 23, 2020, the film won the festival's Audience Award and a mention from the Jury. Continuing its festival run, Paper Tiger was awarded Best in Show and Best Narrative Feature awards at the 2021 Fargo Film Festival. On August 9, Variety announced The Gersh Agency had negotiated a sale, with Gravitas Ventures picking up North American distribution rights. The film was released on August 24, 2021.
