= Detained (2024 film) =

Film by Felipe Mucci

- Theatrical release poster
- Directed by: Felipe Mucci
- Written by: Jeremy Palmer; Felipe Mucci
- Produced by: Ryan Scaringe
- Starring: Abbie Cornish; Laz Alonso; Moon Bloodgood; John Patrick Amedori; Justin H. Min; Breeda Wool; Silas Weir Mitchell
- Cinematography: Dennis Zanatta
- Edited by: Marc Sedaka
- Music by: Matthew James
- Production company: Kinogo Pictures
- Distributed by: Quiver Distribution
- Release date: August 2, 2024
- Running time: 98 minutes
- Country: United States
- Language: English

Detained is a 2024 American psychological thriller film directed by Felipe Mucci. It stars Abbie Cornish, Laz Alonso, Moon Bloodgood, John Patrick Amedori, Justin H. Min, Breeda Wool, and Silas Weir Mitchell.

== Cast ==
- Abbie Cornish as Rebecca Kamen
- Laz Alonso as Detective Avery
- Moon Bloodgood as Detective Moon
- John Patrick Amedori as Robert
- Justin H. Min as Isaac Barsi
- Josefine Lindegaard as Jess
- Breeda Wool as Sarah
- Silas Weir Mitchell as Sullivan

== Production ==
Filming occurred in Los Angeles for a period of 20 days and wrapped on October 29, 2021.

== Release ==
In May 2023, it was announced that Sublimity Entertainment acquired worldwide sales rights to the film. In May 2024, it was announced that Quiver Distribution acquired North American distribution rights to the film. It was released in limited theaters and VOD on August 2, 2024.

== Reception ==
On the review aggregator website Rotten Tomatoes, 81% of 16 critics' reviews are positive, with an average rating of 6.1/10.
