= Erasing Eden =

- Official poster
- Directed by: Beth Dewey
- Screenplay by: Beth Dewey; Justo Diaz
- Produced by: Tina Pavlides
- Starring: Breeda Wool; Ben Rovner
- Cinematography: Yasu Tanida
- Edited by: Beth Dewey
- Production companies: Film Entity; Still Standing
- Distributed by: Indie Rights
- Release date: October 15, 2016 (Tallgrass Film Festival)
- Running time: 70 minutes
- Country: United States
- Language: English

Erasing Eden is a 2016 independent drama film directed by Beth Dewey. The film stars Breeda Wool as a young woman named Eden, who sabotages her wedding day, and makes a life-changing journey in order to regain her identity and independence, leading her down a dark and self-destructive path.

== Plot ==
On the eve of her wedding, Eden, overcome with anxiety at the prospect of married life, drinks a full bottle of scotch in order to numb the suppressed feelings she has been struggling to remain unconscious of. These uncertain feelings had previously been indicated by the need Eden felt in the days leading up to the wedding to record daily supportive messages for herself, affirming that she is doing the right thing in getting married.

The morning after drinking the scotch Eden awakes in the desert, raped, covered in cuts and bruises and having no recollection of the night before. Seeking help, Eden finds it difficult to communicate as her jaw is broken. She encounters some strangers and is mistaken for a homeless person and a meth addict. Following a seizure caused by a head injury, she is taken to the hospital by a reluctant sheriff.

In the meantime Christopher, Eden's fiancee, tries to contact her despite having been told by Eden to not contact her while she is preparing on the morning of the wedding. He becomes frantic.

At the hospital Eden undergoes an operation to repair her broken jaw; however, when it is discovered that there is a problem with medical insurance, she is offered no further help and is dropped off in Skid Row still dressed in a revealing hospital gown. She wanders around until she is helped by a kind biker named Sam who takes her to a local shelter, run by a religious pastor. Eventually walking off again, Eden finds a scooter and wanders the streets, making various dangerous encounters, until she decides it's time to return home.

Having picked up her wedding dress from the store, Eden goes to her apartment, still unsure about marriage. In trying to convince herself that she loves him enough to marry him, she begins to masturbate while fantasizing about Christopher, which ultimately she finds upsetting. Christopher, still distraught from not being able to contact Eden, finally receives a reply from her. The wedding is to go ahead on the beach as planned. But when Eden arrives at the beach, she looks at Christopher and the guests from a distance, then decides not to go through with wedding and again wanders off.

Eden, still in her wedding dress, goes to a tattoo parlor. She is shown having the right side of her face tattooed with an image of a cross which reads "RIP Christopher".

== Production ==
Erasing Eden was shot over the course of one year. Director Beth Dewey worked closely with screenplay writer Justo Diaz, where they constructed the story in a way which was stripped down so that the leading character was left to herself in order to tell her story, as opposed to simplifying the plot having it run at a faster pace. Certain aspects of the film were inspired by Dewey's real-life experiences of blackout drinking, where she admitted that when she was in college she would wake up in places and was unaware of how she go there; Dewey also revealed that during the making of the film, her marriage was beginning to unravel and that the story reflected that. Dewey described the character, stating that "Eden demonstrates that the modern woman no longer needs a hero or villain in her life. She can be both."

The film was shot on a minimal budget using a Canon EOS 5D Mark III, while lighting was supplied by a simple household clip light. During the filming, people were mistaken and believed that the crew were photographing a wedding. Dewey mentioned that "it was liberating to roam around with nothing but a bounce board and a DSLR camera."

The story was written so that the character of Eden has virtually no dialogue during the film and we become acutely aware of Eden’s behaviors and reactions. Post production was a much bigger challenge as it was obvious that the story was difficult to follow without dialogue, therefore, Eden's messages to herself were added so that we can get inside her head.

== Cast ==
- Breeda Wool as Eden
- Ben Rovner as Christopher
- Jess Adams as Sugar
- E. Shepherd Stevenson as Martin
- Suanne Spoke as Joan
- Germaine De Leon as Bailey
- Carl Bressler as Sheriff Robert 'Bob' Berg
- Mickey River as Pete
- Jerrad Machado as Ellis
- Jeneta St. Clair as Candy
- David Carrera as Sam the Biker
- Ben Fritz as Pastor Frank
- Joanne Busch as Nurse Calista
- Sherri Perry as Nurse Rachel
- Aries Sanders as Admitting Clerk
- Verona Blue as Lila

== Reception ==
=== Critical reception ===
Erasing Eden has received a mixed reception. In a somewhat favorable review from Katie Walsh of the Los Angeles Times, she commented on the film's themes of exploration and self-sabotage, however, she went on to mention that "those morals are lost in the downright disturbing and degrading gauntlet Eden has to walk through to find herself. With so much focus on the darkness, it’s hard to embrace the eventual light."

In a positive review from Alan NG of Film Threat, he gave the film a rating of 7 out of 10 and praised the lead's performance, as well as the writing. He said "Breeda Wool gives an exhausting performance in a good way as Eden. She first puts herself through the physical wringer, only to be shoved through an emotional one later on. Kudos to writer/director Beth Dewey and co-writer Justo Diaz for not taking the easy route with their story. Erasing Eden’s story is not for everyone. Sometimes I wanted to quit in the same way I almost (and actually) gave up on my friends like Eden. But it pays off in the end if you open your heart and stick it out."

=== Award nominations ===
Tallgrass International Film Festival (2016)
– Stubbornly Independent Award for Best Film

Connect Film Festival (2016)
– Jury Prize for Best Film for Best Feature Glimpse

Blow-Up Chicago International Arthouse Film Fest (2017)
– Festival Award
