= Sardinia (film) =

- Official Poster
- Directed by: Paul Kowalski
- Written by: Paul Kowalski
- Produced by: Paul Kowalski; Patton Oswalt; Stephanie Furtun; Daniel Leighton
- Starring: Philip Ettinger; Martha Plimpton; Olek Krupa; Breeda Wool
- Cinematography: Arlene Muller
- Edited by: Spencer Koobatian; Paul Kowalski
- Music by: Andreu Diport
- Production company: PKino Films
- Release date: July 26, 2024
- Running time: 19 minutes
- Countries: United States, Poland
- Languages: English, Polish

Sardinia is a 2024 satirical drama short film written and directed by Paul Kowalski, about a serious man who tries to avoid catching a deadly laughing plague in a growingly polarized and dystopian society.

The film is Executive Produced by Emmy-winner Patton Oswalt, and stars Philip Ettinger, Martha Plimpton, Olek Krupa and Breeda Wool.

In November 2024, Deadline named Sardinia an Oscar front runner after it was long-listed for the 2025 Best Live Action Short Academy Award.

The film had previously won Grand Prize Best Director at the 42nd Flickers Rhode Island International Film Festival, after world premiering at the 2024 Indy Shorts film festival. In 2025 it was nominated for both Best Short at Raindance Film Festival and Aesthetica Short Film Festival.

Patton Oswalt described the film "an effortlessly original piece of work" and "beyond timely”. Omeleto called Sardinia “beautifully crafted, intellectually irreverent and thought-provoking…a brilliant inversion of traditional dystopian tropes", likening it to "a modern Kafka fable for our times”.

== Plot ==
After an exotic bird arrives from Sardinia to a US port, a serious Polish-American man called Ryszard Przybyszewski notices his work colleagues stricken with uncontrollable laughter – despite finding himself immune. With news arising that a contagion disrupting nerve signaling and causing fatal laughter is spreading around the globe, Ryszard tries his best to protect his unruly Polish immigrant father and jovial wife, all the while trying to survive in an increasingly dystopian and glum society.

== Cast ==
- Philip Ettinger as Ryszard Przybyszewski
- Olek Krupa as Grzegorz Przybyszewski
- Martha Plimpton as Judith
- Breeda Wool as Hilary
