= AWOL (2016 film) =

- Directed by: Deb Shoval
- Screenplay by: Deb Shoval; Karolina Waclawiak
- Based on: AWOL by Deb Shoval
- Produced by: L.A. Teodosio; Jessica Caldwell; Michel Merkt
- Starring: Lola Kirke; Breeda Wool
- Cinematography: Gal Deren
- Edited by: Jeffrey Wolf
- Music by: Gingger Shankar
- Production companies: Race Point Films; Public Square Films
- Distributed by: The Orchard
- Release dates: April 15, 2016 (Tribeca); May 22, 2017 (US)
- Running time: 85 minutes
- Country: United States
- Language: English

AWOL is a 2016 romantic drama film written and directed by Deb Shoval. It starred Lola Kirke and Breeda Wool. It is based on Shoval's 2010 short film of the same name. It is also Shoval's directorial debut.

== Premise ==
A young woman, Joey, is in search of direction in her small town. A visit to an Army recruiting office appears to provide a path, but when she meets and falls in love with Rayna, that path diverges in ways that neither woman anticipates.

== Cast ==
- Lola Kirke as Joey
- Breeda Wool as Rayna
- Dale Soules as Ruthie
- Bill Sage as Roy
- Ted Welch as Pete
- Britne Oldford as Haley
- Libby George as Gram
- Charlotte Maltby as Kristen
- Sadie Butler as Sadie
- Hannah Dillon as Hannah
- David Koral as Chet

== Reception ==
The film has a 93% approval rating on Rotten Tomatoes based on 15 reviews, with an average rating of 6.8/10.
