= Austin Film Festival =

Film festival

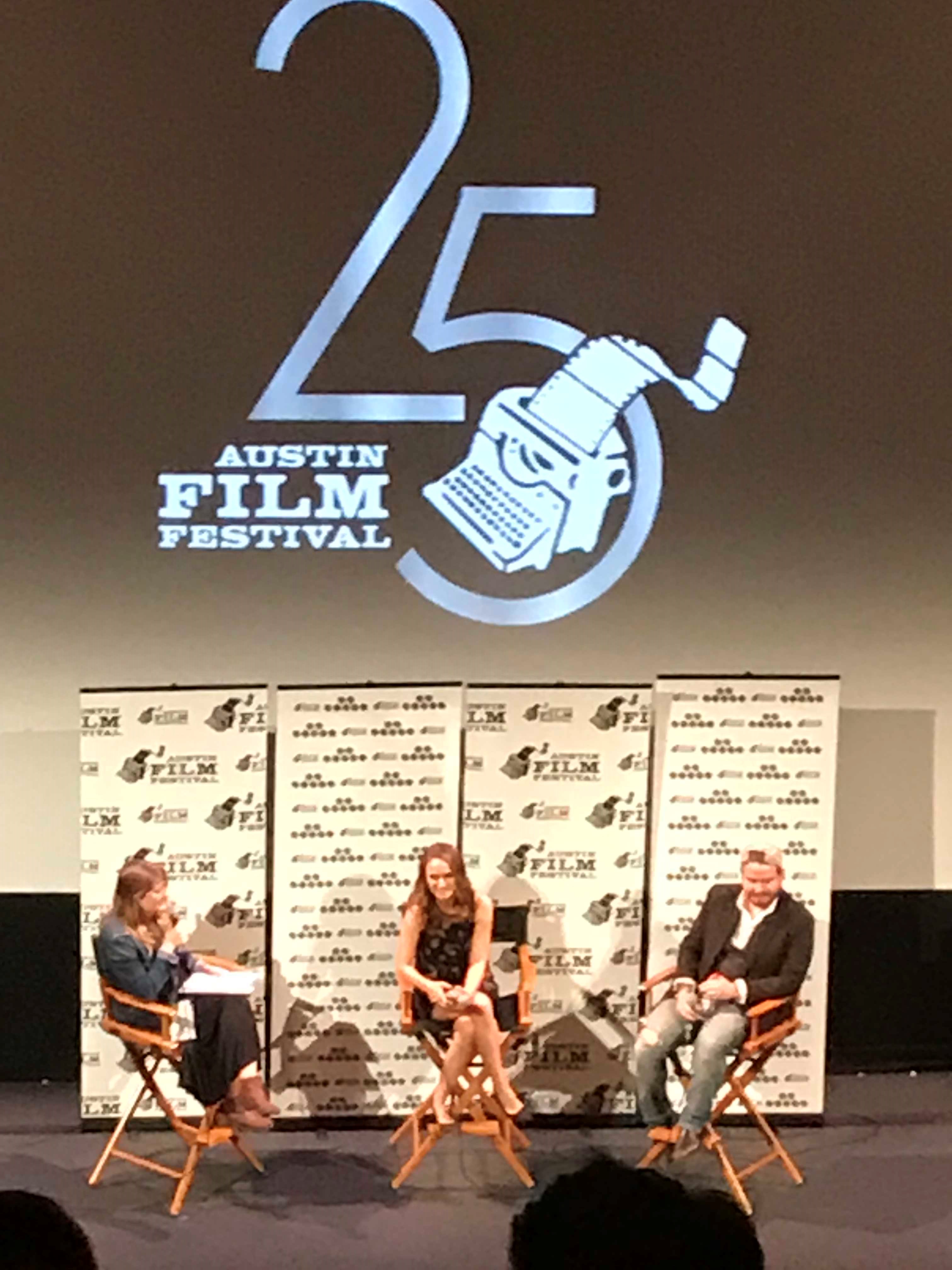
- Austin Film Festival
- Location: Austin, Texas, United States
- Founded: 1994
- Founded by: Barbara Morgan
- Most recent: 2023
- Festival date: October 26 - November 3
- Language: English
- Website: austinfilmfestival.com

Austin Film Festival (AFF), founded in 1994, is an organization in Austin, Texas, that focuses on writers' creative contributions to film. Initially, AFF was called the Austin Heart of Film Screenwriters Conference and functioned to launch the careers of screenwriters, who historically have been underrepresented within the film industry.

AFF is known for its annual October Austin Film Festival & Conference, which is an Oscar-qualifying film festival. The Conference was the first event of its kind, bringing professional and amateur screenwriters together to celebrate the role of screenplays in filmmaking and host conversations focusing on craft and on particular films and television series. In addition, the Screenplay Competition receives more entries than any other competition in the world. Several competition finalists and semi-finalists have made sales or found managers and agents at the conference.

== Film Festival ==
=== Overview ===
Each October, Austin Film Festival & Conference presents a program of narrative, animated and documentary features and shorts, including premieres, advance screenings and independent films. Films showcase the art and craft of strong narrative storytelling and screenings are often accompanied by question and answer sessions with cast members and filmmakers.

Past guests of the Festival include Joel and Ethan Coen, Ron Howard, Luke Wilson, Owen Wilson, Steven Zaillian, David Milch, Wes Anderson, Robert Duvall, Buck Henry, Dennis Hopper, Shane Black, Robert Altman, Caroline Thompson, David Chase, James Franco, Johnny Depp, John Landis, Garry Shandling, Bryan Singer, Oliver Stone, James L. Brooks, Harold Ramis, Mitchell Hurwitz, Lawrence Kasdan, Claire Danes, Barry Levinson, Russell Crowe, Sydney Pollack, Mike Judge, Buck Henry, John Lasseter, Robert Rodriguez, Jeff Daniels, and David Simon.

=== Past films ===
Recent major films screened at recent festivals include Saltburn (2023), Inside Llewyn Davis (2013), Silver Linings Playbook (2012), The Artist (2011), The Descendants (2011), Jeff Who Lives at Home (2011), 127 Hours (2010), Black Swan (2010), Up in the Air (2009), Precious: Based on the novel Push by Sapphire (2009), and the US Premiere of Jeff Nichol's first film Shotgun Stories in 2007.

- In 2009, AFF screened Ron Howard's Apollo 13 – winner of two Oscars in 1996 – as part of a special presentation
- In 2006, playwright/screenwriter Horton Foote and actor Robert Duvall were present at AFF for a special screening of their 1983 film Tender Mercies.
- In 2005, Austin Film Festival hosted a screening of Shane Black's directorial debut Kiss Kiss Bang Bang, which had been given a staged reading at the 2003 Festival.
- In 1998, The Coen Brothers premiered the director's cut of Blood Simple at the Festival.
- Dennis Hopper was on hand at the 1997 Festival for a screening of 1969's Oscar-nominated classic Easy Rider.
- In 1996, AFF held an anniversary screening of 1987's indie classic Hollywood Shuffle attended by writer/director Robert Townsend;

=== 2011 ===
Among 2011's screenings were Michel Hazanavicius' The Artist, Jay and Mark Duplass' Jeff Who Lives at Home, and Alexander Payne's The Descendants. Restive, a thriller written and directed by newcomer Jeremiah Jones won the Esurance Audience Award for Best Narrative Feature, while there was a tie in Best Documentary Feature category between Adam Cornelius' Ecstasy of Order: The Tetris Masters and Dennis Rice's Stories from an Undeclared War. The award for Extraordinary Contribution to Film-Actor award was given to Johnny Depp.

=== 2012 ===
The 2012 Austin Film Festival opened with David Chase's Not Fade Away with Chase in attendance. Julia Stiles represented both Silver Linings Playbook and It's a Disaster, the screening for which included a majority of the cast and crew. Distinguished Screenwriter Awardee Eric Roth presented a screening of The Insider and Outstanding Television Writer awardee Chris Carter showed episodes from both The X-Files and Millennium as well as a retrospective screening of Murder By Decree. Other guest programmers included Paul Feig who selected The Human Tornado and Phil Rosenthal who selected Broadway Danny Rose. The film slate, programmed by Bears Fonte and Stephen Jannise, featured more World and U.S. Premieres than in any prior year of the festival including the world premieres of Ambush at Dark Canyon (as To Kill a Memory), Come Morning, Congratulations, Ex-Girlfriends, Flatland 2: Sphereland, Idol Is Dead, Junk, Last Man(s) on Earth, Mar Del Plata, Murt Ramirez Wants to Kick My..., The Muslims Are Coming!, Pictures of Superheroes, The Rep, Sample This, Spinning Plates, and Spring Eddy, which was produced by Executive Director Barbara Morgan and written and directed by George Anson, one of the first AFF programmers.

=== 2013 ===
The 20th Anniversary Austin Film Festival honored actress Susan Sarandon with the 2013 Extraordinary Contribution to Filmmaking Award. Sarandon presented a retrospective screening of John Turturro's Romance and Cigarettes, and joined a conversation on the art and craft of storytelling with the other 2013 awardees, Vince Gilligan (Outstanding Television Writer), Jonathan Demme (Extraordinary Contribution to Filmmaking), Callie Khouri (Distinguished Screenwriter), and Barry Josephson (Heart of Film Award).

Austin Film Festival's Opening Night featured the US premiere of Jonathan Sobel's break-out Toronto International Film Festival heist hit The Art of the Steal starring Kurt Russell, Matt Dillon and Jay Baruchel, as well as the world premiere of AFF success story Coffee, Kill Boss, a film that emerged from the festival's Screenplay Competition in 2011. Coffee, Kill Boss stars Eddie Jemison (Ocean's 11-13, Hung), Noureen DeWulf (Anger Management) and Robert Forster (Jackie Brown, Mulholland Drive). AFF's closing night film featured the US premiere of All Cheerleaders Die. Lucky McKee and Chris Sivertson co-wrote and directed the film, hailed as a monster midnight sensation in the Toronto International Film Festival.

Programmed by Ryan Darbonne and Bears Fonte, the 20th anniversary lineup featured more world and U.S. premieres than ever before in the festival's history. Overall, the 2013 festival included 28 world premiere features: Cavemen, Finding Neighbors, Jack, Jules, Esther and Me, The Odd Way Home, Siren, Dog Days, Living Dolls, Political Bodies, Take Away One, 120 Days, La Navaja de Don Juan, Brightest Star, Coffee, Kill Boss, Mop King, Blood Punch, Dark Mountain, Innocence, Dug Up, Dear Sidewalk, The Road to Livingston, Sombras de Azul, Always Learning, The Bloc, The Fable of Shannon Cable, Handy, Not Safe For Work, Speak Now, and 3 References, as well as another 8 US premieres. 9 films were picked up for distribution within two weeks of the festival's close.

=== 2014 ===
The 2014 Austin Film Festival honored writer and director Jim Sheridan with the 2014 Distinguished Screenwriter Award. Sheridan presented his 1993 film In the Name of the Father, followed by a conversation with other 2014 awardees, Matthew Weiner (Outstanding Television Writer), and Edward Zwick (Extraordinary Contribution to Filmmaking).

Austin Film Festival's Opening Night featured a screening of Richard Lagravenese's The Last Five Years starring Anna Kendrick and Jeremy Jordan. During the Closing Night, Jon Stewart made his screenwriting and directorial debut when he screened his feature film Rosewater. Rosewater, based on the New York Times best-selling memoir Then They Came for Me: A Family's Story of Love, Captivity, and Survival, stars Gael Garcia Bernal.

Overall, the 21st annual Austin Film Festival featured 18 world premieres including: 7 Minutes and Dawn Patrol. The festival also featured the Academy Award-winning film The Imitation Game starring Benedict Cumberbatch and Keira Knightley, as well as Big Hero 6, winner of the Academy Award for Best Animated Feature.

=== 2018 ===
Notable films screened at AFF included Shoplifters, Boy Erased, Can You Ever Forgive Me?, The Front Runner, Little Woods, Roger Corman's Rock All Night (1957), and The Black String.

=== 2019 ===
AFF screened features A Hidden Life (Writer/Director: Terrence Malick), Clemency (Writer/Director: Chinonye Chukwu), Crazy Ex-Girlfriend: Oh My God I Think It's Over (Director: Katie Hyde), Ford v Ferrari (Writer: Jez & John Henry Butterworth, Jason Keller, Director: James Mangold), Harriet (Writer: Gregory Allen Howard and Kasi Lemmons, Director: Kasi Lemmons), Honey Boy (Writer: Shia LaBeouf, Director: Alma Har’el), Last Week At Ed's (Director: Meg Kasdan, Lawrence Kasdan), Marriage Story (Writer/Director: Noah Baumbach), Motherless Brooklyn (Writer: Edward Norton (Screenplay), Jonathan Lethem (based on the novel by), Director: Edward Norton), Peace (Writer/Director: Robert Port), Portrait of a Lady on Fire (Writer/Director: Céline Sciamma), Rattlesnake (Writer/Director: Zak Hilditch), Skyman (Writer/Director: Daniel Myrick), The Kill Team (Writer/Director: Dan Krauss), The Report (Writer/Director: Scott Z. Burns), The Truth (Writer: Hirokazu Koreeda, Adaption by Lea Le Dimna, Director: Hirokazu Koreeda), The Two Popes (Writer: Anthony McCarten, Director: Fernando Meirelles), Waves (Writer/Director: Trey Edward Shults), Yellow Rose (Writer: Diane Paragas & Annie J. Howell, Director: Diane Paragas), The Bygone (Writer/Director: Graham Phillips, Parker Phillips), DC Noir (Writer: George Pelecanos, Director: George Pelecanos, Gbenga Akinnagbe, Nick Pelecanos, Stephen Kinigopoulos), Drowning (Writer/Director: Melora Walters), Family Obligations (Writer/Director: Kenneth R. Frank), The Illegal (Writer/Director: Danish Renzu) The Killing of Kenneth Chamberlain (Writer/Director: David Midell), Limbo (Writer: Anil Kizilbuga, Director: Tim Dunschede), Not To Be Unpleasant But We Need To Have A Serious Talk (Writer: Giorgos Georgopoulos, Maria Fakinou, Director: Giorgos Georgopoulos), Undertow (Writer/Director: Miranda Nation), Wade in the Water (Writer: Chris Retts, Director: Mark Wilson), The Witness (Writer: Mitko Panov, Wladyslaw Pasikowski, David Riker, Director: Mitko Panov).

=== 2020 ===
AFF screenings in 2020 went all-virtual due to the impact of COVID-19 pandemic.

Writer-Director Paul Kowalski won the Narrative Feature Audience Award and a Jury mention for his film Paper Tiger, which made its world premiere. Kowalski was subsequently named one of “25 Screenwriters To Watch” by the festival.

The Badger, written and directed by Kazem Mollaie, made its North American premiere, and won the Best Narrative Jury Award.

The virtual writer's conference included panels and workshops featuring Lindsay Doran, Scott Frank, Kevin Willmott and Tracey Scott Wilson.

=== 2021 ===
The first in-person return since 2019 was held. The Writer's Conference featured Brad Ingelsby, Lisa Joy and Linda Yvette Chavez (Gentefied). The opening night film was Peter Hedges' COVID-19 themed The Same Storm on October 21–28. Notable films were C'mon C'mon, The French Dispatch, The Souvenir Part II and The Worst Person in the World.

=== Film competition ===
AFF is accredited by the Academy of Motion Picture Arts & Sciences, making all Jury Award-winning Narrative Short, Documentary Short, and Animated Short films eligible for an Academy Award.

Notable Past Winners

- In 2000, Jason Reitman won the Jury Award for his short film In God We Trust and later won AFF Audience Awards for Juno (2007) and Up in the Air (2009). Juno went on to receive four Academy Award nominations, winning the Oscar for Best Writing: Original Screenplay in 2008; Up in the Air was nominated for six Oscars in 2010, including a nomination for Best Director for Reitman.
- In 2003 and 2005, Cary Fukanaga received AFF awards for his student short films; Fukanaga has since gone on to direct the critically acclaimed Sin Nombre (2009) and Jane Eyre (2011).
- The Fantastic Flying Books of Mr. Morris Lessmore, the 2011 AFF Best Animated Short Jury and Audience Award Winner, went on to win the Academy Award for Best Animated Short in 2012.

== Writer's Conference ==
=== Overview ===
The conference, which takes place in October and lasts for four days, features a variety of panel discussions, conversations with filmmakers and screenwriters, workshops, roundtables, script-to-screen examples, and attracts producers, agents, managers, development executives, working screenwriters and filmmakers. The conference sessions cover basics like researching and editing your story, pitching and marketing your script or film, finding and working with a writing partner or director, facing a blank page on a bad day, or risking a new direction after establishing success.

The 2011 conference featured more than 90 sessions including such examples as:

- A Conversation with Alec Berg (Seinfeld, Curb Your Enthusiasm)
- The Art of Storytelling with John Lasseter (Chief Creative Officer for Walt Disney and Pixar), Caroline Thompson (Edward Scissorhands, The Nightmare Before Christmas), and Hart Hanson (Bones, The Finder)
- In-depth presentations on the script-to-screen process for Toy Story 3 with screenwriter Michael Arndt, Fight Club with screenwriter Jim Uhls and author Chuck Palahniuk, Bob's Burgers with writer/producer Jim Dauterive, and Veronica Mars with show creator Rob Thomas

=== Awards ===
Since its inception, Austin Film Festival has awarded prominent screenwriters for their contribution to the industry. In 2000, the festival created a separate award for television writers, and then in 2006, an award for filmmakers, usually a director or a writer/director. Four times the festival has awarded an actor with a separate award, in 2011, 2013, 2014, and 2015. In 2013, the festival created an award for producers, naming it the Heart of Film Award after the original name of the festival.

- Distinguished Screenwriter Award
- Outstanding Television Writer Award
- Extraordinary Contribution to Filmmaking Award
- Extraordinary Contribution to Film - Acting Award

=== Past awardees ===
Distinguished Screenwriter Award Recipients

2025 Rian Johnson (Knives Out trilogy)
2024 Robin Swicord (The Curious Case of Benjamin Button)
2023 Scott Alexander and Larry Karaszewski (Ed Wood, The People vs. Larry Flynt, Man on the Moon)
2022 James Gray (Armageddon Time)
2021 Scott Frank (The Queen's Gambit)
2019 Ronald Bass (Rain Man)
2018 Tony Gilroy (Michael Clayton (film)
2017 Kenneth Lonergan (Manchester by the Sea)
2016 Nancy Meyers (The Intern), (The Holiday)
2015 Brian Helgeland (42), (A Knight's Tale)
2014 Jim Sheridan (My Left Foot), (In the Name of the Father)
2013 Callie Khouri (Thelma & Louise), Nashville
2012 Eric Roth (Forrest Gump, The Insider, Munich)
2011 Caroline Thompson (Edward Scissorhands, The Nightmare Before Christmas)
2010 David Peoples (Blade Runner, Unforgiven)
2009 Steven Zaillian (Schindler's List, The Girl with the Dragon Tattoo)
2007 John Milius (Apocalypse Now, Conan the Barbarian)
2006 Shane Black (Lethal Weapon, Kiss Kiss Bang Bang)
2005 Harold Ramis (Ghostbusters, Groundhog Day)
2004 Barry Levinson (Sleepers, Toys)
2003 Frank Pierson (Dog Day Afternoon, Cool Hand Luke)
2002 Richard LaGravenese (P.S. I Love You, The Fisher King)
2001 Lawrence Kasdan (Return of the Jedi, Raiders of the Lost Ark)
2000 Paul Mazursky (Down and Out in Beverly Hills, An Unmarried Woman)
1999 James L. Brooks (The Simpsons, As Good as It Gets)
1998 Paul Schrader (Taxi Driver, Raging Bull)
1997 Buck Henry (The Graduate, Catch-22)
1996 Bill Wittliff (Legends of the Fall, The Perfect Storm)
1995 Horton Foote (To Kill a Mockingbird, Tender Mercies)

Outstanding Television Writer Award Recipients

2025 Yvette Lee Bowser (Living Single)
2024 Ronald D. Moore (For All Mankind, Outlander)
2023 Damon Lindelof (The Leftovers, Watchmen)
2022 Stephen Merchant (The Outlaws)
2021 Michael Schur (Parks and Recreation)
2019 David Benioff & D. B. Weiss (Game of Thrones)
2018 Larry Wilmore (The Bernie Mac Show)
2017 Keenen Ivory Wayans (In Living Color)
2016 Marta Kauffman (Grace and Frankie), (Friends)
2015 Norman Lear (All in the Family), (The Jeffersons)
2014 Matthew Weiner (Mad Men), (The Sopranos)
2013 Vince Gilligan (Breaking Bad), (The Lone Gunmen)
2012 Chris Carter (The X-Files), (Millennium)
2011 Hart Hanson (Bones, The Finder)
2010 David Simon (Homicide: A Year on the Killing Streets, The Wire)
2009 Mitchell Hurwitz (The Ellen Show, Arrested Development)
2008 Greg Daniels (King of the Hill, The Office)
2007 Glenn Gordon Caron (Now and Again, Medium)
2006 David Milch (NYPD Blue, Deadwood)
2005 Mike Judge (Beavis and Butt-Head, Office Space)
2004 Garry Shandling (It's Garry Shandling's Show, The Larry Sanders Show)
2003 Tom Fontana (The Jury, Oz)
2002 Darren Star (Sex and the City, Beverly Hills, 90210)
2001 Gary David Goldberg (Family Ties, Spin City)
2000 David Chase (Northern Exposure, The Sopranos)

Extraordinary Contribution to Filmmaking Award Recipients

2025 Christopher McQuarrie (Mission: Impossible (film series))
2022 Darren Aronofsky (The Whale)
2018 Roger Corman (The Wild Angels), (The Pit and the Pendulum (1961 film)
2017 Walter Hill (Alien), (The Warriors)
2016 Paul Feig (Ghostbusters), (The Heat)
2015 John Singleton (Four Brothers), (2 Fast 2 Furious), (Shaft)
2014 Edward Zwick (Glory), (Legends of the Fall)
2013 Jonathan Demme (The Silence of the Lambs),(Philadelphia)
2012 Frank Darabont (Shawshank Redemption, The Walking Dead, The Green Mile)
2011 John Lasseter (Up, Tangled, Toy Story)
2010 Robert Rodriguez (Sin City, Grindhouse)
2009 Ron Howard (The Da Vinci Code, A Beautiful Mind)
2008 Danny Boyle (Slumdog Millionaire, 127 Hours)
2007 Oliver Stone (Platoon, Wall Street)
2006 Sydney Pollack (Out of Africa, Tootsie)

Extraordinary Contribution to Film – Acting Award Recipients

2015 Chris Cooper (The Bourne Identity), (American Beauty)
2013 Susan Sarandon (Dead Man Walking), (Atlantic City), (Thelma & Louise)
2011 Johnny Depp (Edward Scissorhands, Alice In Wonderland, Pirates of the Caribbean)

Heart of Film Award Recipient

2023 James V. Hart (Hook, Bram Stoker's Dracula, and Contact)
2019 Daniel Petrie Jr. (Beverly Hills Cop)
2013 Barry Josephson (Columbia Pictures), (Enchanted), (Bones)

Polly Platt Award for Producing

2025 Christine Vachon (Carol, Boys Don't Cry, Far from Heaven)
2024 Kathleen Kennedy (The Sixth Sense, Lincoln, Star Wars: The Force Awakens)
2023 Lauren Shuler Donner (X-Men franchise, Pretty in Pink, Free Willy)
2022 Dede Gardner (Women Talking)
2021 Stephanie Allain (Hustle & Flow)
2019 Sarah Green (film producer) (The Tree of Life (film)), (Loving (2016 film))

New Voice Award

2024 Rachel Kondo (Shōgun)
2023 So Young Shelly Yo (Smoking Tigers)
2022 Nikyatu Jusu (Nanny)
2021 Channing Godfrey Peoples (Miss Juneteenth)
2019 Catherine Reitman (Workin' Moms)

Writers’ Writer Award

2025 Greg Kwedar & Clint Bentley (Train Dreams)
2024 Justin Marks (Shōgun)
2023 Cord Jefferson (American Fiction)

== Screenplay and teleplay competitions ==
=== History/background ===
Since 1994, Austin Film Festival has been recognizing the work of the writer through the Screenplay and Teleplay Competitions. With representatives from agencies and production companies participating in the judging process, advancing writers and their scripts gain industry attention, networking opportunities and workshops.

In past years, judges have included representatives from Warner Bros., Nickelodeon Movies, ABC Studios, Fortis Films, Pixar, Escape Artists at Sony, Oasis Media, United Talent Agency and many others.

All awards are presented during the Austin Film Festival Awards Luncheon. Those advancing to the Semifinalist level or beyond will have the option to attend exclusive panels hosted by participating panelists. They will also be included in the Producers Book, distributed to competition judges and other industry professionals.

=== Categories ===
Categories for the Screenplay Competition include:

- Drama
- Comedy
- The Enderby Entertainment Award
- The Skybound Entertainment Sci-Fi Award
- Horror
- The HUMANITAS Originals
- Short Screenplay

Categories for the Teleplay Competition include:

- AMC One-Hour Pilot
- One-Hour Spec
- Sitcom Pilot
- Sitcom Spec
- The HUMANITAS Originals

AFF also has a category for Scripted Digital Series, both written and produced.

In 2017 AFF announced their inaugural Playwriting and Scripted Fiction Podcast competitions aimed at supporting writers and championing story across all mediums.

Finalists in all categories receive one complimentary Producer's Badge to attend the Austin Film Festival and Conference and one complimentary Awards Luncheon ticket.

== Young Filmmakers Program ==
The Young Filmmakers Program was created to encourage and support students ranging in ages from 9 – 18 with their creativity and literacy skills through the arts of screenwriting and filmmaking.

=== Digital Storytelling ===
Digital Storytelling (DS), an arts education program improving students’ reading, writing and communication skills using film, was launched in fall 2005 and integrated into high school English Language Arts (ELA) classes.

DS provides the curriculum, reading materials, state-of-the-art film equipment, and professional filmmaker instructors to participating schools. The curriculum developed by Austin Film Festival and Austin Independent School District has allowed DS to be an effective component of TEKS test preparation, and has been implemented in high schools with a high number of economically disadvantaged students or students considered at-risk. DS has proven to be a success over the past years in Akins High School, where the program has been used since 2005. Akins High School ELA TEKS scores have increased from 77% in 2005 to 86% in 2007, while the district average score was 83% in 2007. Both the principal and teachers of Akins High School acknowledge DS as a main contributor to this improvement. DS is working toward being incorporated into all Austin ISD high school as well as neighboring school systems.

=== Arts education outreach ===
Austin Film Festival's Young Filmmakers Program Arts Education Outreach Scholarship grants access to over 300 scholarships awarded to students and teachers in both middle and high school. Participants are given the chance to attend the 19th Annual Austin Film Festival and Conference to learn more about the art and business of filmmaking and screenwriting. The conference also hosts panels specifically designed for students and teachers.

=== Summer Film Camp ===
Summer Film Camp, presented by Austin Film Festival's Young Filmmakers Program, is an annual program of screenwriting, filmmaking, and claymation workshops designed specifically for young and aspiring filmmakers. The camp is held at Austin High School, home to one of the leading media arts programs in the U.S. Specialized workshops offer students ages 9–18 access to in-depth personal instruction from industry professionals.

Campers are also given the opportunity to participate in panel discussions with talented guest speakers concerning their expertise and experiences in the industry. Past speakers include Anne Rapp (screenwriter - Dr. T and the Women, script supervisor - Funny People, He's Just Not That Into You, The Color Purple), Jeff Nichols (writer/director – Shotgun Stories, Take Shelter), Dan French (Emmy Award-nominated late-night comedy writer), Alvaro Rodriguez (screenwriter, Machete) and Tom Holland (writer/director - Fright Night, Child's Play).

== Austin Film Festival's On Story ==
On Story, AFF's thirty-minute television series on Public television, first aired in 2011 on Austin’s PBS station KLRU. It is distributed nationwide by the National Educational Telecommunications Association. On Story gives viewers a look behind the scenes at the creative process behind the making of popular movies and television shows. The series consists of footage from AFF panels and screenings, featuring screenwriters and filmmakers discussing their talents and films. Each episode is aired with one or two short films that have been previously screened at the Festival with an introduction from the film's writer or director.

In October 2013, AFF published On Story--Screenwriters and Their Craft with the University of Texas Press. This book presents the advice of award-winning screenwriters who have appeared on the show On Story, including John Lee Hancock, Peter Hedges, Lawrence Kasdan, Whit Stillman, Robin Swicord and Randall Wallace.

In 2014, On Story received the Lone Star EMMY Award for the episode Breaking Bad: A Conversation with Vince Gilligan.

In February 2015, On Story launched a radio program airing on Austin's public radio station KUT FM and Public Radio International (now Public Radio Exchange).

On Story is currently in over 80% of television markets. Season 6 of the On Story television series was launched in April 2016.
