= Ultrasound (film) =

2021 American film by Rob Schroeder

- Theatrical release poster
- Directed by: Rob Schroeder
- Written by: Conor Stechschulte
- Based on: Generous Bosom by Conor Stechschulte
- Produced by: Rob Schroeder; Georg Kallert; Charlie Prince
- Starring: Vincent Kartheiser; Chelsea Lopez; Breeda Wool; Tunde Adebimpe; Rainey Qualley; Chris Gartin; Bob Stephenson
- Cinematography: Matthew Rudenberg
- Edited by: Brock Bodell
- Music by: Zak Engel
- Production company: Lodger Films
- Distributed by: Magnet Releasing
- Release dates: June 15, 2021 (Tribeca); March 11, 2022 (United States)
- Running time: 103 minutes
- Country: United States
- Language: English
- Box office: $2,908

Ultrasound is a 2021 American science fiction film directed and produced by Rob Schroeder in his feature directorial debut. It is based on the comic book Generous Bosom by Conor Stechschulte, who also wrote the screenplay. It stars Vincent Kartheiser, Chelsea Lopez, Breeda Wool, Tunde Adebimpe, Rainey Qualley, Chris Gartin, and Bob Stephenson. The plot follows a man's sexual encounter with a married woman that results in them questioning their sanity. The film premiered at the Tribeca Film Festival on June 15, 2021, and was released in the United States on March 11, 2022, by Magnet Releasing. It received generally positive reviews from critics.

== Plot ==
On a rainy night, Glen's car runs over a spike strip. He seeks refuge in the nearby home of married couple Art and Cyndi. Art invites him to spend the night and persuades him to sleep with Cyndi, since Art's antidepressants have largely ruined his own intimacy with her. Some time later, Art inexplicably shows up at Glen's apartment and reveals to him that Cyndi is pregnant. Art implores Glen to pursue his relationship with Cyndi and to consider being a father to her child. At the same time, Cyndi decides to leave Art and move in with Glen. Months later, while preparing to go to the hospital, Glen and a very pregnant Cyndi are kidnapped by two men who had secretly been recording their conversations since Cyndi first moved in.

Shortly thereafter, Cyndi and Glen (who is now paralyzed) are patients in a psychiatric research facility, unaware of each other's fates after the kidnapping. Newly-hired Dr. Shannon works with both under the guidance of lead researcher Dr. Conners, who is developing hypnotic therapy technology using high-pitched audio frequencies. During their therapy sessions, Dr. Shannon and Glen role play his and Cyndi's previous interactions while Dr. Connors observes and plays various frequencies over the audio system. The medical team promises Glen that these activities will eventually allow him to overcome his paralysis. Dr. Shannon also works with Cyndi, revealing to her that Art is not actually her husband. He is a hypnotist who performed at her high school when she was 17. He used her as a subject and, when she proved to be particularly susceptible, put her into a permanent delusion that he was her English teacher, on whom she had a crush, ultimately leading to their marriage when she was 19.

Private conversations between Dr. Shannon and Dr. Connors reveal that Art had originally been Dr. Connors' partner, but suffered a mental breakdown and split off to pursue their research on his own. He used his hypnosis stage-act to identify susceptible individuals for his experiments. After discovering Glen during a wedding performance, he hypnotically induced the relationship between Glen and Cyndi, as well as their false perception that Cyndi was pregnant. Dr. Connors' team kidnapped the two so that they could reverse engineer the work Art had done on them, help them regain their original memories, and use the knowledge to positively impact society.

However, during a demonstration to military investors, Dr. Connors reveals that Glen's paralysis is actually a hypnotic suggestion which his team induced and which they can turn on and off with sound. He proposes this as a method for prisoner control. Outraged, Dr. Shannon, who did not realize her efforts were being used in this way, helps Glen and Cyndi escape the facility, though Glen remains partly under the original hypnotic delusions induced by Art.

In a secondary plotline, aspiring senator Alex Harris has begun an extra-marital affair with a young woman named Katie, who is now visibly pregnant with his child but is also somehow oblivious to it. Desperate to maintain his image, Harris had hired Art to prevent Katie from realizing that she is pregnant and to keep her willfully sequestered during his campaign. Art induced the relationship between Glen and Cyndi, and the illusion of pregnancy, so that the child could eventually be passed off to them without anyone knowing. However, when Harris viciously beats Art due to his mistaken belief that Art had sex with Katie, Art undoes Katie's hypnosis. At one of Harris' political rallies, Art can be seen as a supporter preparing to use his hypnotic technology in some way.

== Cast ==
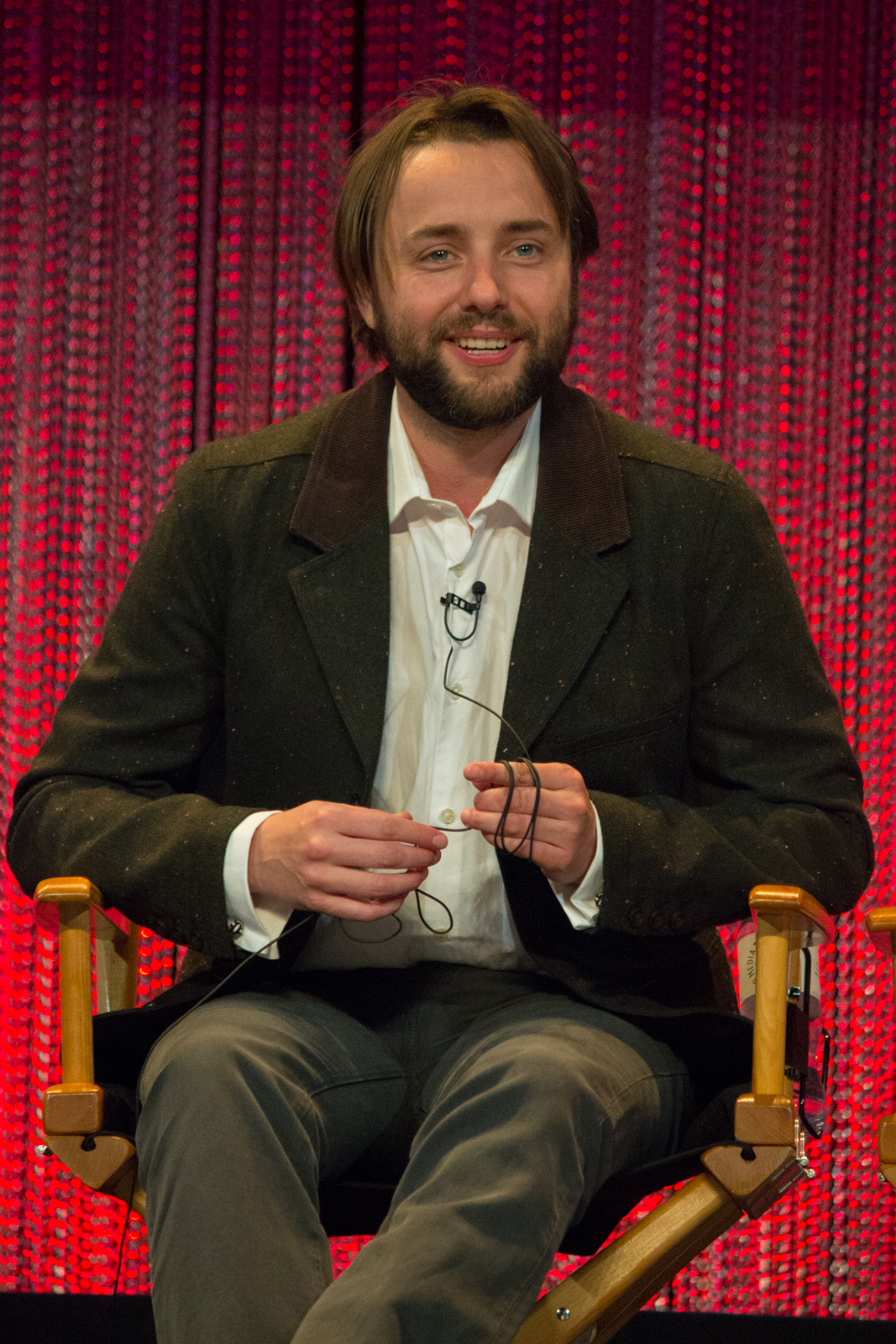
Vincent Kartheiser plays Glen

- Vincent Kartheiser as Glen
- Chelsea Lopez as Cyndi
- Breeda Wool as Shannon
- Tunde Adebimpe as Dr. Conners
- Rainey Qualley as Katie
- Chris Gartin as Senator Harris
- Bob Stephenson as Art

== Production ==
Ultrasound is based on the four-book comic Generous Bosom by Conor Stechschulte, who began writing the screenplay in the summer of 2016. The first draft took four to five months to complete. Beth Nugent, Janet Desaulniers, Jesse Ball, Chris Sullivan, and Jim Trainor contributed to the script. Stechschulte said director and producer Rob Schroeder contacted him after he finished writing the second book in the series: "When he approached me with optioning just the story and get someone else to write the script, I was well ... no: I'd really like to write the script and see where it's going to go. I didn't fully know where it was going to go and I wanted to be in charge of that journey." Schroeder cited The Manchurian Candidate (1962) as a major influence. Filming in Los Angeles concluded on March 19, 2020. Editing was completed by producer Brock Bodell.

== Release ==
Ultrasound premiered at the Tribeca Film Festival on June 15, 2021, at Pier 76 in Hudson River Park. The film was also screened at Fantasia International Film Festival on August 6, 2021. In October 2021, Magnet Releasing acquired the film's distribution rights. The film was released in the United States on March 11, 2022.

== Reception ==
In the United States and Canada, the film earned $2,195 from six theaters in its opening weekend. It reached the bottom of the box office charts in its second weekend with $81 from one theater. On the review aggregator website Rotten Tomatoes, 79% of 53 critics' reviews are positive, with an average rating of 6.8/10. The website's consensus reads: "An auditory funhouse of intrigue, Ultrasound pushes narrative boundaries to deliver an audacious look at the horrors of gaslighting." Metacritic, which uses a weighted average, assigned the film a score of 55 out of 100, based on 7 critics, indicating "mixed or average" reviews.
