= Aleksander Krupa =

Polish actor (born 1947)

Olek Krupa
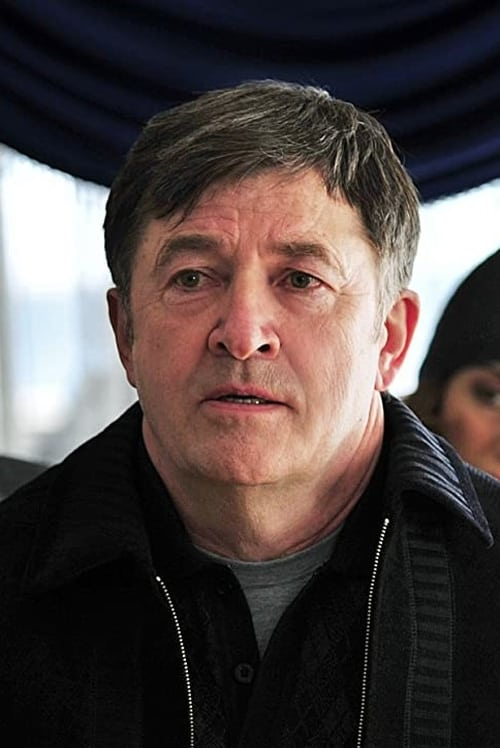
- Olek Krupa in Blue Bloods, 2011
- Born: Aleksander Krupa; 18 March 1947 (age 79); Rybnik, Poland
- Other name: Olek Krupa
- Occupation: Actor
- Years active: 1974–present
- Notable work: Home Alone 3
- Spouse: Noa Ain (div.)
- Children: 1

Aleksander Krupa (born 18 March 1947), often credited as Olek Krupa, is a Polish-American film and television actor known for playing villains and criminals, such as in Eraser, Blue Streak, Home Alone 3 and The Italian Job. He portrayed a Bosnian Serb general engaged in genocide against Bosnian Muslims in Behind Enemy Lines and portrayed the President of Russia in the action thriller film Salt. Krupa played minor roles in Hollywood movies including X-Men: First Class, Hidden Figures, and The Fate of the Furious.

== Early life ==
Krupa was born in Rybnik, Poland. In 1974 he graduated from the Aleksander Zelwerowicz National Academy of Dramatic Art in Warsaw and later began performing on stage, notable in Theater Scena STU in Kraków. In 1981, Krupa emigrated to United States.

== Career ==
Krupa first appeared in a documentary in 1984 entitled Far from Poland. He later began performing on off-Broadway stage. His film debut was in the 1986 film 9½ Weeks. In the following years he played Edward Teller in the made-for-television movie Day One (1989), and Erich von Stroheim in the miniseries The Kennedys of Massachusetts (1990). He guest-starred on the television series Miami Vice, New York Undercover, Law & Order, Law & Order: Special Victims Unit, Law & Order: Criminal Intent, Blue Bloods, Person of Interest and The Blacklist. Krupa had a recurring role in the FX period drama series, The Americans.

== Personal life ==
He married Noa Ain, a composer and painter. They have one child.

== Filmography ==
Key
| † | Denotes films that have not yet been released |

=== Film ===
List of Aleksander Krupa film appearances
| Year | Title | Role | Notes |
|---|---|---|---|
| 1984 | Far from Poland | Jan | Voice role; Documentary |
| 1986 | 9½ Weeks | Bruce | |
| 1988 | Call Me | Hennyk | |
| 1989 | Misplaced | Jacek's father | |
| 1989 | Black Rainbow | Tom Kuron | |
| 1990 | Miller's Crossing | Tad | |
| 1990 | Men of Respect | Beda | |
| 1992 | Mac | Polowski | |
| 1993 | Geoffrey Beene 30 | Man | Short film |
| 1993 | Undercover Blues | Zubic | |
| 1993 | Naked in New York | Professor Korta | |
| 1993 | The Contenders | Romanian bureaucrat | |
| 1995 | Fair Game | Zhukov | |
| 1996 | Eraser | Sergei Ivanovich Petrofsky | |
| 1996 | Under the Bridge | —N/a | |
| 1997 | Kicked in the Head | Borko | |
| 1997 | Home Alone 3 | Peter Beaupre | |
| 1998 | OK Garage | Yannick | |
| 1998 | Stardust | Karol Wasacz | |
| 1999 | Simply Irresistible | Valderon | |
| 1999 | No Vacancy | Leonard | |
| 1999 | Blue Streak | Jean LaFleur | |
| 1999 | Oxygen | Madelin's Lover | |
| 2000 | The Opportunists | Ted Walikaki | |
| 2000 | Thirteen Days | Andrei Gromyko | |
| 2001 | Brooklyn Babylon | Uncle Vlad | |
| 2001 | Behind Enemy Lines | Miroslav Lokar | |
| 2003 | Bringing Rain | Head Master Gula | |
| 2003 | The Italian Job | Mashkov | |
| 2006 | 508 Nelson | Yuri Nemov | |
| 2007 | The Fifth Patient | Khodorov | |
| 2007 | Neal Cassady | Julian Nabokov | |
| 2008 | Burn After Reading | Krapotkin | |
| 2008 | 1937 | Bernard | Short film |
| 2009 | Whatever Works | Morgenstern | |
| 2010 | Salt | Russian President Matveyev | |
| 2011 | X-Men: First Class | Soviet Captain | |
| 2011 | Katya | Viktor | Short film |
| 2011 | Someday This Pain Will Be Useful to You | Henryk Maria | |
| 2012 | The Dictator | Gazprom Executive | |
| 2013 | Admission | Polokov | |
| 2013 | One Trick Dieter | Tom | Short film |
| 2013 | Blood Ties | Tommy | |
| 2013 | Butterflies of Bill Baker | Dr. Burzeckaia | |
| 2014 | I'm Obsessed with You | Stanislaw | |
| 2016 | Hidden Figures | Karl Zielinski | Ensemble cast |
| 2017 | The Fate of the Furious | Russian Minister of Defence | |
| 2018 | Bel Canto | Fyodorov | |
| 2019 | The Sunlit Night | Vassily | |
| 2024 | Reagan | Mikhail Gorbachev | |
| 2024 | Sardinia | Grzegorz Przybyszewski | Short film |
| TBA | 4 Kings † | Shant | Post-production |

=== Television ===
List of Aleksander Krupa television appearances
| Year | Title | Role | Notes |
|---|---|---|---|
| 1987 | Spenser: For Hire | Latta | Episode: "The Song of Orpheus" |
| 1987 | Miami Vice | Vater Wajda | Episode: "God's Work" |
| 1988 | Tattingers | Elaine's fiancé | Episode: "Virgin Spring" |
| 1989 | Day One | Edward Teller | Television movie |
| 1990 | The Kennedys of Massachusetts | Erich von Stroheim | Television Miniseries (3 episodes) |
| 1990 | Ivory Hunters | —N/a | Television movie |
| 1991–1999 | Law & Order | Constantin Volsky / Victor Popov / Sasha Osinski | 4 episodes |
| 1994 | Normandy: The Great Crusade | Jan Jesionek | Voice role; Television movie |
| 1995 | My Antonia | Krajiek | Television movie |
| 1995 | New York Undercover | Don Casaloma | Episode: "Young, Beautiful and Dead" |
| 1996 | Andersonville | Olek Winsnovsky | Television movie |
| 1997 | Dellavenura | Krinsky | Episode: "Clean Slate" |
| 1998 | Soldier of Fortune, Inc. | Wilhelm Dieter Heinrich | Episode: "A Walk in the Park" |
| 1999 | Oz | Yuri Kosygin | 2 episodes |
| 2000 | Law & Order: Special Victims Unit | Alex Strizkopf | Episode: "Russian Love Poem" |
| 2001 | Deadline | Alvi Udogova aka 'Godzilla' | Episode: "Red Herring" |
| 2001 | As the World Turns | Inspector Guido Boggia | Recurring role (4 episodes) |
| 2003 | Law & Order: Criminal Intent | Ben Laurette | Episode: "Undaunted Mettle" |
| 2004 | Monk | Elmer Gratnik | Episode: "Mr. Monk Takes Manhattan" |
| 2004 | The Grid | Stana Moore | Television Miniseries (6 episodes) |
| 2008 | New Amsterdam | Viktor Brodsky | Episode: "Reclassified" |
| 2009 | Life on Mars | Vasilli Lukin | Episode: "Take a Look at the Lawmen" |
| 2011 | Blue Bloods | Maximilian Gruschenko | Episode: "Family Ties" |
| 2011 | White Collar | Alec | Episode: "Scott Free" |
| 2011 | Person of Interest | Ivan Yogorov | Episode: "Witness" |
| 2013–2017 | The Americans | General Vijktor Zhukov | Recurring role (3 episodes) |
| 2015 | Forever | The King | Episode: "The King of Columbus Circle" |
| 2015 | The Blacklist | Leonid Javin | Episode: "Ruslan Denisov (No. 67)" |
| 2015 | Madam Secretary | President Pavel Ostrov | Recurring role (3 episodes) |
| 2016 | MacGyver | Victor | Episode: "Wire Cutter" |
| 2016 | Divorce | Gustav | Episode: "Gustav" |
| 2017 | Iron Fist | Radovan Bernivig | Recurring role (3 episodes) |
| 2017 | Elementary | Fyodor Ukhov | Episode: "Fly Into a Rage, Make a Bad Landing" |
| 2022 | WeCrashed | Evgeny Risakov | Episode: "This Is Where It Begins" |
