= Breeda Wool =

American actress, writer and producer

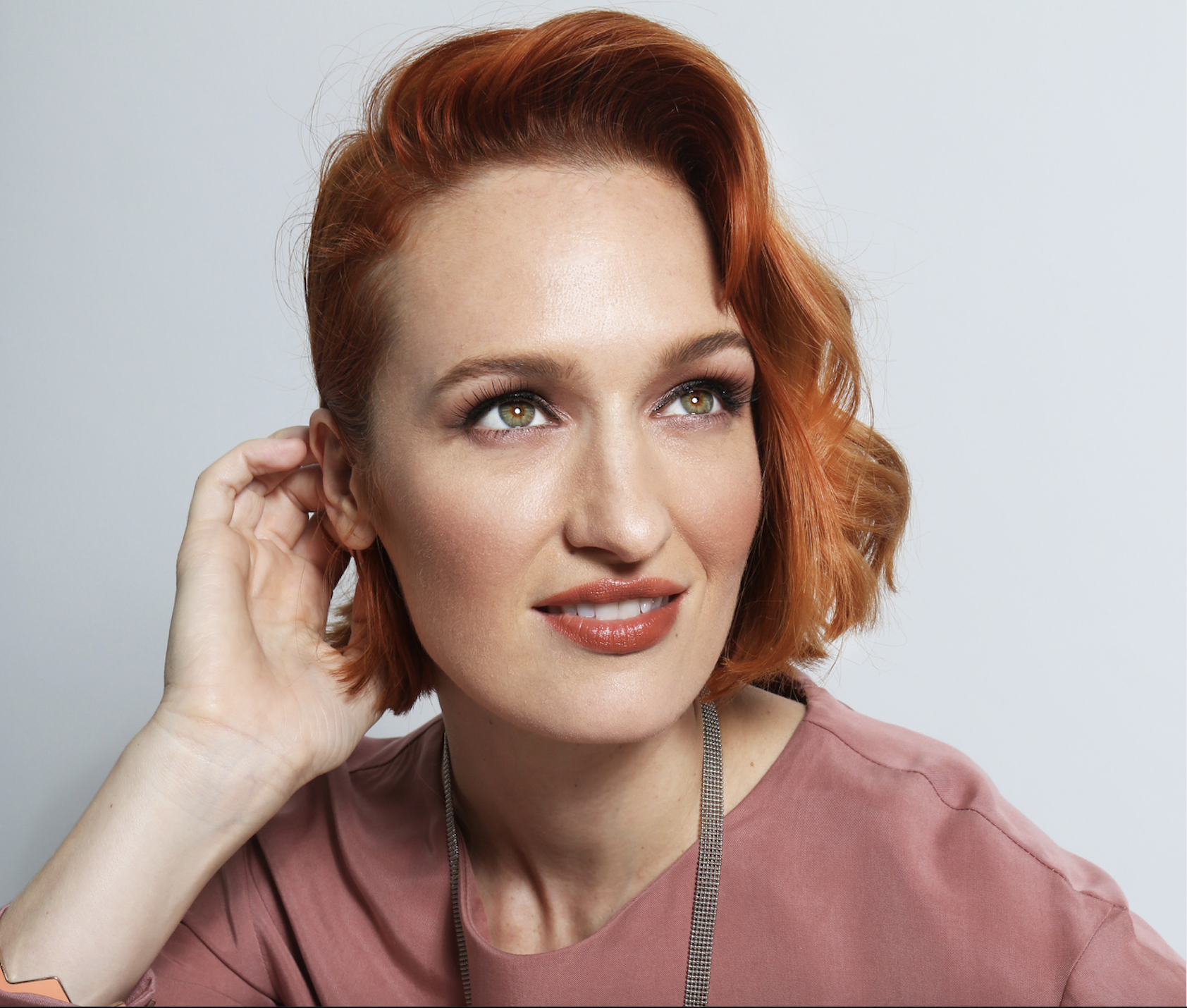
- Born: Urbana, Illinois, U.S.
- Years active: 2007–present
- Partner: Matt Friedman
- Children: 1

Breeda Wool is an American actress, writer and producer. She is best known for her roles as Lou Linklatter in the Audience crime drama series Mr. Mercedes (2017–2019) and Faith Duluth in the Lifetime/Hulu drama series UnREAL (2015–2018).

Her major film credits include AWOL (2016), XX (2017), Automatic at Sea (2016), Erasing Eden (2016) and Craters of the Moon (2013).

Wool also appeared as Victoria in the Amazon digital series Betas (2013). She made guest appearances in Freeform's Famous in Love (2017–2018), NBC's Midnight, Texas (2017–2018), Law & Order: Special Victims Unit, two episodes of Law & Order: Criminal Intent (2001–2011), the two-hour series finale of CSI: Crime Scene Investigation (2000–2015), and HBO's Room 104 (2020).

== Early life ==
Wool was born and raised in Urbana, Illinois. Wool knew that she wanted to be a performer at a young age. She starred in numerous theatrical productions throughout her elementary and high school career, before her talent landed her a musical theater scholarship to Wagner College. While there, she transitioned from theater to short films, starring in the Columbia University graduate short, Dandelion Fall. Her desire to pursue acting after college took her to New York City, where she spent ten years performing in theater, reciting Shakespeare, sketch comedy, and avant-garde movement dance before relocating to Los Angeles. Since making the move, she has continued to nurture her craft by taking a weekly class at the Imagined Life Theater.

Wool's late father was a "wild, Irish guitar-playing scientist" and her mother, whom she greatly admires, is a "California, artist beach-babe" who studied in Ireland where they met. They were both college professors.

== Education ==
Wool graduated Wagner College, where she triple-majored in Psychology, Theater and Philosophy. Wool studied acting at the Imagined Life Theater from 2010 to 2013.

== Career ==
In 2010, Wool began performing with the Upright Citizens Brigade improv sketch comedy troupe. In 2010, Wool starred in the critically acclaimed short film AWOL, which received recognition from the Sundance Women in Film Panel and the Gotham Independent Film Awards before being adapted as a feature-length film in 2016. She was awarded Best Shorts Actress in 2013 by the Woods Hole Film Festival for her role in the short film Lambing Season.

She appeared in various other short films, including The Slows (2018), Rflktr (2018), Midnight Confession (2017), The Boy Who Cried Fish! (2016), and Dandelion Fall (2007), amongst others.

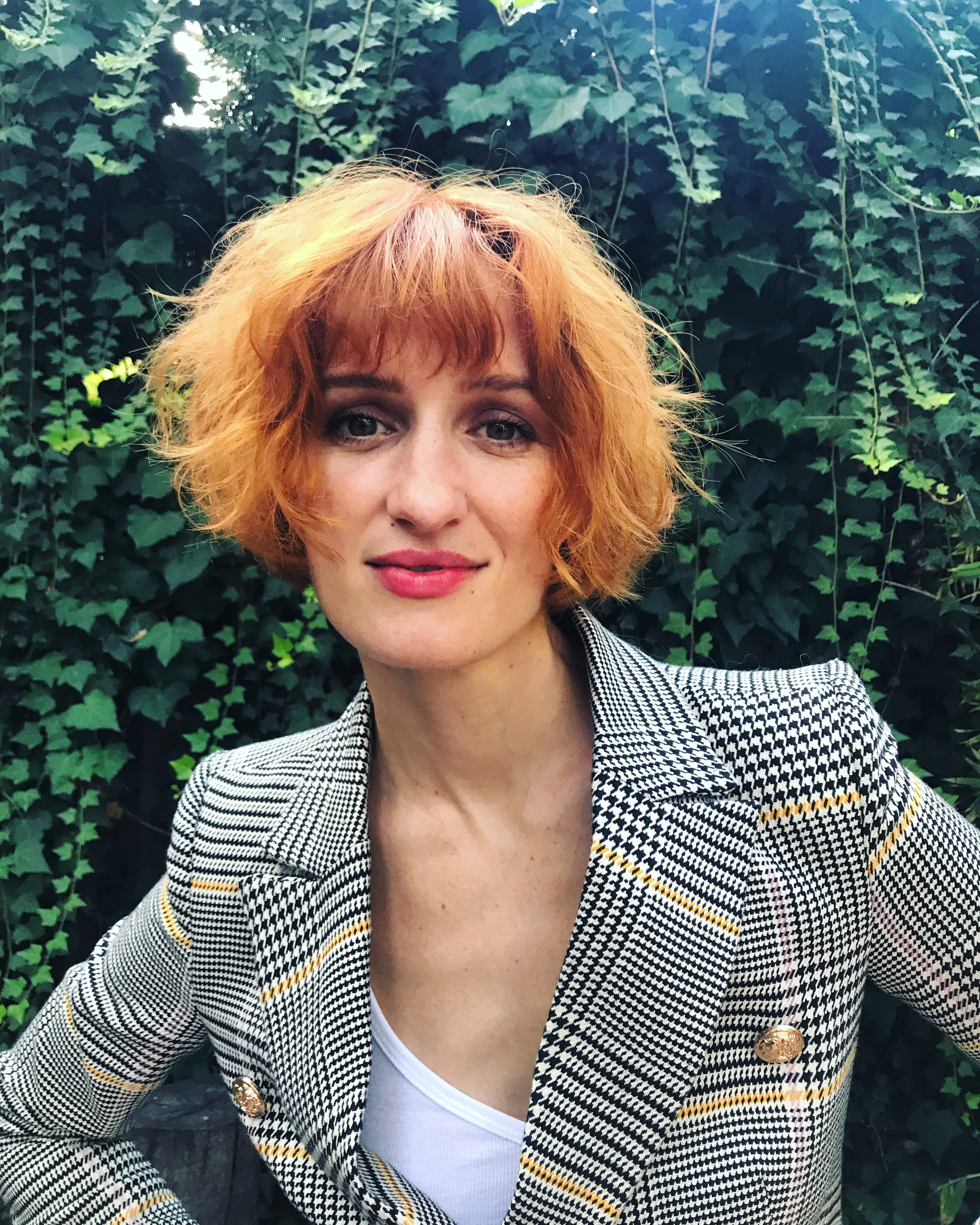
Mr. Mercedes

She was featured in Metallica's music video for "Confusion". Wool has appeared on various television programs, including The Affair (2018), Famous in Love (2017), Vice Principals (2017), Midnight, Texas (2017), Strangers (2017), CSI: Crime Scene Investigation (2015), Weeds (2010), Law & Order: Special Victims Unit (2010), and Law & Order: Criminal Intent (2007, 2009).

Wool was an executive producer and co-writer for the feature film Mother's Little Helpers. She also was a producer for Rflktr (2018) and Miss Miao (2014), as well as a writer for the short film Shelton's Oasis (2013).

In 2013, Wool was cast as Victoria in Amazon's web series Betas.

In 2015, Wool appeared in the first season of UnREAL as Faith, a closeted Christian lesbian. She reprised her role as Faith in a 2017 web series spin off, The Faith Diaries, and returned to UnREAL in the fourth season.

In 2017, Wool was cast as a series regular in the Audience crime drama Mr. Mercedes, a series based on the Stephen King's Bill Hodges trilogy. Mr. Mercedes was renewed for a third season on the Audience network.

== Personal life ==
Wool practices Yoga, plays volleyball, draws, and takes piano lessons. Wool favors vegetarian food.

Wool lives in Los Angeles, California with her boyfriend Matt Friedman. Friedman, a music producer and musician, is an outspoken feminist. They have a daughter born in June 2020.

== Filmography ==
=== Film ===
Year	Title	Role	Notes
2007	Black Hole	Christine	Short film
2007	Dandelion Fall	Billie	Short film
2009	Dumping Lisa	Strip Club Hostess	
2010	The Masterpiece	The Journalist	
2010	AWOL	Rayna	Short film
2011	Bee	Christine	Short film
2013	Craters of the Moon	Molly	
2013	Shelton's Oasis	Bridgette	Short film
2013	Santa Monica	Arguing Wife	Short film
2013	Home	Alpha Feral Woman	Short film
2013	Lambing Season	Bridget	Short film
2014	Upstairs	Piper Olsen	Short film
2014	Miss Miao	Patrice	Short film
2014	Disaster Preparedness	Rose	Short film
2015	Rhie: The New Sovereignty	Model	Short film
2015	White Cops and Unarmed Civilians Playset!		Short film
2015	I'll Eat You Alive	Martha	Short film
2016	AWOL	Rayna	
2016	The Boy Who Cried Fish!	Miranda	Short film
2016	Jo Cool	Emcee	Short film
2016	Erasing Eden	Eden	
2016	Automatic at Sea	Grace	
2017	XX	Gretchen	Segment: "Don't Fall"
2017	Midnight Confession	Donna Donna	Short film
2018	Rflktr	Captain Ezra Avery	Short film
2018	A Place to Stay	Rose	Short film
2018	Breaking News	Carol Kelly	Short film
2018	The Slows	Greta	Short film
2019	Mother's Little Helpers	Julia Pride	
2019	Long Time Listener, First Time Caller	Nan	Short film
2021	Mass	Judy	
2021	Ultrasound	Shannon	
2022	The Seven Faces of Jane	Jane B	
2023	Birth/Rebirth	Emily	
2024	Detained	Sarah James	
2024	Sardinia	Hilary	Short film

=== Television ===
Year	Title	Role	Notes
2007	Law & Order: Criminal Intent	Protestor No. 1	Episode: "Offense"
2009	Law & Order: Criminal Intent	Woman	Episode: "Identity Crisis"
2010	Law & Order: Special Victims Unit	Lynn Drexel	Episode: "Savior"
2010	Weeds	Boarding Agent	Episode: "Theoretical Love Is Not Dead"
2012	The Boring Life of Jacqueline	Breeda	Episode: "The Close Encounter"
2013–2014	Betas	Victoria	5 episodes
2015	CSI: Immortality	Rebecca O'Bryan	TV movie
2015–2018	UnREAL	Faith Deluth	11 episodes
2016	UnREAL: The Faith Diaries	Faith Deluth	Web series
2016	Slumber Party	Herself	Episode: "Breeda Wool"
2016	Dream Corp LLC	Mother (voice)	2 episodes
2017	Strangers	Zoe	Episode: "Honeymooners"
2017	Midnight, Texas	Bowie	Episode: "Angel Heart"
2017	Vice Principals	Lynn Russell	Episode: "Think Change"
2018	Famous in Love	Marva Dunwoody	Episode: "Guess Who's (Not) Coming to Sundance?"
2018	The Affair	Mrs. Cruz	Episode: #4.6
2019	GLOW	Denise	2 episodes
2017–2019	Mr. Mercedes	Lou Linklatter	Series regular
2020	The Walking Dead	Aiden	Episode: "What We Become"
2020	Room 104	Poppy March	Episode: "Bangs"
2022–2023	National Treasure: Edge of History	Kacey	10 episodes
2024	The Walking Dead: The Ones Who Live	Aiden	Episode: "Gone"
2026	NCIS	Dr Childs	Episode: in too deep

=== Music videos ===
Year	Title	Notes
2016	"Confusion"	Metallica video

=== Producer ===
Year	Title	Notes
2014	Miss Miao	Short
2018	Rflktr	Short
2019	Mother's Little Helpers	

=== Writer ===
Year	Title	Notes
2013	Shelton's Oasis	Short
2019	Mother's Little Helpers	

== Accolades ==
Year	Association	Category	Work	Result
2013	Woods Hole Film Festival	Best Shorts Actress	Lambing Season	Won
2014	Victoria TX Indie Film Fest	Best Actress	Craters of the Moon	Nominated
2016	Action on Film International Film Festival, USA	Best Supporting Actress – Short	The Boy Who Cried Fish!	Nominated
2021	Independent Spirit Awards	Robert Altman Award	Mass	Won
