= Alan Silva & the Sound Visions Orchestra =

Live album by Alan Silva
- Released: 2001
- Recorded: May 31, 1999
- Venue: St. Nicholas of Myra Church, New York City
- Genre: Free jazz
- Label: Eremite Records; MTE026
- Producer: Michael Ehlers

Alan Silva chronology
Transmissions (1999)	Alan Silva & the Sound Visions Orchestra (2001)	Emancipation Suite (2002)

Alan Silva & the Sound Visions Orchestra is a live album by multi-instrumentalist Alan Silva. It was recorded in May 1999 at St. Nicholas of Myra Church in New York City during the annual Vision Festival, and was released in 2001 by Eremite Records. On the album, Silva is joined by a large ensemble known as the Sound Visions Orchestra.

== Reception ==
Professional ratings
Review scores
Source	Rating
AllMusic	3/5 stars
The Penguin Guide to Jazz	2.5/4 stars

In a review for AllMusic, Steve Loewy wrote: "Silva gathered some of the cream of the East Coast avant-garde for this huge production... The results are loud, brash, brassy, and violent, pulverizing with squalls of power... All three parts of the composition are laced with plenty of solos, which explode with giddiness... This is a majestic and magnificent recording, and if it is difficult to listen to at one setting, it is nonetheless worth the effort."

The authors of the Penguin Guide to Jazz Recordings stated: "the recording quality simply isn't good enough to handle such a complex entity, and some absorbing solos and ensemble passages get lost in the mix."

Derek Taylor, writing for All About Jazz, commented: "The sheer magnitude of the instrumental arsenal at Silva's disposal makes for some unbelievably dense collective dissonance and the undulating unified sound fills the audio space in gargantuan gusts... With the Visions Orchestra Silva has accomplished a rare feat in creative improvised music, a sustainable large-piece ensemble that makes full and impressive use of both its girth and diversity."

In an article for Paris Transatlantic, Dan Warburton wrote: "when [Silva's] 23-piece Sound Visions Orchestra is in full flight, we might as well be back in the glory days of the Celestrial Communication Orchestra... Silva, like nobody else I can think of except perhaps Cecil Taylor, knows just how to set ensembles on fire... Play this mother loud and let these guys throw their sound against your walls."

== Track listing ==
Composed by Alan Silva.

1. "I" – 21:26
2. "II" – 17:56
3. "III" – 13:14

== Personnel ==
- Alan Silva – synthesizer, conductor
- Elliot Levin – piccolo, flute, soprano saxophone
- William Connell Jr. – bass clarinet, flute
- Karen Borca – bassoon
- Ori Kaplan – alto saxophone
- Rob Brown – alto saxophone
- Sabir Mateen – tenor saxophone, clarinet, flute
- Andrew Lamb – tenor saxophone
- Edward "Kidd" Jordan – tenor saxophone
- Scott Currie – baritone saxophone
- J. D. Parran – bass saxophone, alto clarinet
- Raphe Malik – trumpet
- Stephen Haynes – trumpet, brass
- Taylor Ho Bynum – trumpet, brass
- Roy Campbell Jr. – trumpet, flugelhorn
- Art Baron – trombone
- Steve Swell – trombone
- Bill Lowe – bass trombone, tuba
- Mark Taylor – French horn
- Joseph Daley – tuba
- Mark Hennen – piano
- Wilber Morris – bass
- Jackson Krall – drums
- Steve Dalachinsky – voice (poet)
