= Blue Winter =

Live album by Fred Anderson
- Released: 2005
- Recorded: December 12, 2004
- Venue: Dibden Center for Arts, Johnson State College, Johnson, Vermont
- Genre: Jazz
- Length: 109:26
- Label: Eremite
- Producer: Michael Ehlers

Fred Anderson chronology
Back Together Again (2004)	Blue Winter (2005)	Timeless, Live at the Velvet Lounge (2006)

Blue Winter is a double album by American jazz saxophonist Fred Anderson, which was recorded live at Vermont's Johnson State College in 2004 and released on Eremite, a label founded by producer Michael Ehlers. The set features four long improvisations by a trio with bassist William Parker and drummer Hamid Drake. While the three have worked together before, in quartet with Kidd Jordan on the album 2 Days in April, this is their first trio recording.

== Reception ==
Professional ratings
Review scores
Source	Rating
The Penguin Guide to Jazz Recordings	3/4 stars

The All About Jazz by Kurt Gottschalk states "Blue Winter is pure Anderson —with the best rhythm section in the land to be sure— and an indispensable selection of energy improv."

In an article for the Chicago Tribune, Howard Reich ranked the album as number 2 jazz record of 2005 and notes that "Anderson rarely has been more faithfully recorded, the often leathery quality of his midrange, the acidity of his high notes and the barreling quality of his nethermost pitches captured more vividly than ever before."

== Track listing ==
All compositions by Anderson / Drake / Parker

1. "I" - 44:16
2. "II" - 37:59
3. "III" - 13:08
4. "IV" - 14:03

== Personnel ==
- Fred Anderson - tenor sax
- Hamid Drake - drums
- William Parker - bass, nagaswaram
