= From the River to the Ocean =

Studio album by Fred Anderson & Hamid Drake
- Released: 2007
- Studio: Soma Studios, Chicago
- Genre: Jazz
- Length: 63:43
- Label: Thrill Jockey

Fred Anderson chronology
The Great Vision Concert (2007)	From the River to the Ocean (2007)	Live at the Velvet Lounge Volume III (2008)

From the River to the Ocean is an album by American jazz saxophonist Fred Anderson with drummer Hamid Drake, which was released in 2007 on the Thrill Jockey label.

== Music ==
For this project Anderson and Drake drafted three fellow Chicagoans: guitarist Jeff Parker and bassists Harrison Bankhead and Joshua Abrams, both of whom double on other instruments.

"Planet E" is an Anderson composition which appears previously on The Milwaukee Tapes Vol. 1 and Fred Anderson / DKV Trio. "Strut Time" is a classic set-closing blues by the saxophonist. "For Brother Thompson" is a modal piece dedicated to the late trumpeter Malachi Thompson and featuring Bankhead on piano and Drake chanting in Arabic. The title track and the closer, “Sakti/Shiva”, find Abrams moving to guimbri, a three-stringed acoustic bass associated with the Gnawa music.

== Reception ==
Professional ratings
Review scores
Source	Rating
AllMusic	4.5/5 stars

In his review for AllMusic, Sean Westergaard states "They might be known as avant-garde players, but this album is totally approachable and extremely soulful. From the River to the Ocean is not only among Anderson's finest albums to date, it has to be among the top jazz albums of 2007."

The All About Jazz review by Troy Collins notes that "The resonant, mature beauty found on From the River to the Ocean proves that contemporary free jazz doesn't always have to burn white-hot to generate emotional heat; simmering intensity can yield the same results."

The JazzTimes review by David Whiteis says "This set emphasizes subtlety over show, group interplay over individual scenery chewing, and ideas over pyrotechnics. In other words, it demands your full attention — it’s not background music for multitasking."

== Track listing ==
1. "Planet E" (Fred Anderson) - 14:43
2. "Strut Time" (Fred Anderson) - 21:15
3. "For Brother Thompson" (Harrison Bankhead) - 7:44
4. "From the River to the Ocean" (Josh Abrams, Hamid Drake) - 13:36
5. "Sakti/Shiva" (Fred Anderson, Josh Abrams, Hamid Drake) - 6:25

== Personnel ==
- Fred Anderson - tenor sax
- Hamid Drake - drums, frame drum
- Jeff Parker - guitar
- Harrison Bankhead - cello, piano, bass
- Josh Abrams - bass, guimbri
- Jim Newberry - photography
