= Timeless, Live at the Velvet Lounge =

Live album by Fred Anderson
- Released: April 18, 2006
- Recorded: July 12 &b 13, 2005
- Venue: Velvet Lounge, Chicago
- Genre: Jazz
- Length: 66:22
- Label: Delmark
- Producer: Robert G. Koester

Fred Anderson chronology
Blue Winter (2005)	Timeless, Live at the Velvet Lounge (2006)	The Great Vision Concert (2007)

Timeless, Live at the Velvet Lounge is an album by American jazz saxophonist Fred Anderson, which was recorded in 2005 and released on Delmark. It was the third live recording on Bob Koester's label made at Fred's own club, the Velvet Lounge, shortly before the original venue's demolition and a month after Anderson was honored at the 2005 Vision Festival. He's backed by long-time associates, bassist Harrison Bankhead and drummer Hamid Drake. The event was also filmed and issued on DVD.

== Reception ==
Professional ratings
Review scores
Source	Rating
AllMusic	4.5/5 stars

In his review for AllMusic, Sean Westergaard states "The whole performance is practically a non-stop series of highlights, although the title track alone might be worth the price of admission. The interplay between these players is simply amazing; improvised music doesn't get much better than this."

The All About Jazz review by Glenn Astarita notes that "On these extended workouts, the trio exposes its force with hypnotically engineered Latin grooves, African rhythms and expansive ostinatos. In addition, Anderson sets himself apart from many of his peers, navigating the avant-garde with melodic phrasings which serve as improvisational forays."

The JazzTimes review by Chris Kelsey says "Each of Anderson’s stream-of-consciousness phrases is unique unto itself. His elliptical lines move in, around, above and below the rhythm section, engaging then disengaging the rhythm and harmony with a gruff capriciousness. With Bankhead in the bass chair, this is one of the best trios going."

The PopMatters review by Daniel Spicer claims "This is breathtaking stuff" and notes that "Anderson may be 77 years old but his is a powerful, thrashing, muscular tone that’s not afraid to take risks. You get the feeling that, here in his own club, he’s comfortable enough to just blow."

== Track listing ==
All compositions by Anderson / Bankhead / Drake

1. "Flashback" - 14:05
2. "Ode to Tip" - 16:11
3. "By Many Names" - 12:35
4. "Timeless" - 23:31

== Personnel ==
- Fred Anderson - tenor sax
- Harrison Bankhead - bass
- Hamid Drake - drums, percussion
