= Oluyemi Thomas =

American jazz saxophonist

- Born: Oluyemi Thomas; August 16, 1952 (age 73); Detroit, Michigan
- Genres: Jazz, free jazz, avant-garde jazz
- Occupation: Musician
- Instruments: bass clarinet, saxophone

Oluyemi Thomas (born August 16, 1952) is a free jazz bass clarinetist and saxophonist.

Thomas was born in Detroit, Michigan. He began playing clarinet as a child, and was exposed to the music of Billie Holiday, Dinah Washington, Dizzy Gillespie, and Duke Ellington by his parents. He attended Washtenaw College in Ann Arbor Township, Michigan, studying engineering and music, and receiving an Associate of Science degree in Mechanical Engineering, then worked for Bechtel. In 1974, he moved to the San Francisco Bay Area, where he was employed by a construction company and became involved with the music scene. During this time, he met his future wife and musical partner, the poet Ijeoma Chinue Thomas, who was visiting from Washington, D.C.. Thomas moved to D.C. to join her, and the couple soon married before moving back to the west coast, settling in Oakland.

Together, the duo founded a group called Positive Knowledge, performing works inspired by their Baháʼí Faith. Over the years, in addition to releasing a number of albums, they toured the world, and collaborated with a wide range of musicians, including Marshall Allen, Eddie Gale, Henry Grimes, Kidd Jordan, Peter Kowald, Miya Masaoka, Roscoe Mitchell, Sunny Murray, Larry Ochs, William Parker, Wadada Leo Smith, Cecil Taylor, John Tchicai, and Michael Wimberly. Writing for The New York Times, Ben Ratliff stated that the group was responsible for "the best moments" of the opening concert of the 2002 Vision Festival, and commented: "The Thomases practice a mixture of free jazz and poetry, and practice it well. Mr. Thomas played interval-jumping improvisations that recalled bird songs and Eric Dolphy; Ms. Thomas intoned and repeated lines, going from whisper to shriek. They played in close communication, feeding off each other's sputtering energy."

Thomas refers to his music as "adventurous jazz," and acknowledged the influence of Eric Dolphy, calling him "my great teacher." Although Thomas performs on both bass clarinet and saxophone, he stated that "the bass clarinet has that floor-of-the-ocean tone that I really adore." In an AllMusic review, Michael G. Nastos wrote: "The bass clarinet of Oluyemi Thomas is freely able to discourse at length in an overblown harmonic fashion reminiscent of latter-period John Coltrane. This unabashed sovereignty creates more rhythmic opportunities than melodic ones. He sounds like an extension of David Murray, and the difference is the emphasis on building sheets of sound gradually from pianissimo to forte and back again on... longer improvisations."

In addition to being an improvisor, Thomas composes, and is known for his colorful graphic scores, which, according to Duane Deterville, who interviewed him, resemble paintings by Kandinsky. Thomas began experimenting with notation in the 1970s, and said that his engineering background influenced the appearance of his scores.

According to Thomas, his music is an expression of his Baháʼí faith. In an interview, he commented that "music comes from the world of beyond... to convey collective reality," and stated that the performance of music is "having a conversation with God."

== Discography ==
=== As leader or co-leader ===
- Unity in Multiplicity (Rastascan, 1996)
- Transmissions (Eremite, 1999) with Alan Silva
- Before The Beginning (Recorded, 2002)
- Nigeria (Not Two, 2006)
- The Power of Light (Not Two, 2007) with Henry Grimes
- Beneath Tones Floor (NoBusiness, 2010) with Sirone and Michael Wimberly

=== With Positive Knowledge ===
- Another Day's Journey (Music & Arts, 1994)
- Invocation #9 (Music & Arts, 1995)
- At the Center of the Threshold (Ear Light, 2000)
- Live in New York (Edgetone, 2003)
- First Ones (Charles Lester, 2005)
- Invisible Wisdom (Charles Lester, 2006)
- Edgefest Edition (Not Two, 2010)
- Live in Detroit (self-released, 2018)

=== As sideman ===
With Marco Eneidi

- Marco Eneidi & The American Jungle Orchestra (Botticelli, 1996)

With Henry Kaiser and Wadada Leo Smith

- Yo Miles! (Shanachie, 1998)

With Sunny Murray

- Perles Noires Vol. 2 (Eremite, 2005)

With Alan Silva

- H.Con.Res.57/Treasure Box (Eremite, 2003)

With Gino Robair

- Buddy Systems: Selected Duos and Trios (Meniscus, 1999)
