= Emancipation Suite =

Emancipation Suite #1

Live album by Alan Silva, Kidd Jordan, and William Parker
- Released: 2002
- Recorded: May 29, 1999
- Venue: Vision Festival, St. Nicholas of Myra Church, New York City
- Genre: Free jazz
- Label: Boxholder Records; BXH 023
- Producer: Alan Silva, Kidd Jordan, William Parker

Alan Silva chronology
Alan Silva & the Sound Visions Orchestra (2001)	Emancipation Suite #1 (2002)	H.Con.Res.57/Treasure Box (2003)

Emancipation Suite #1 is a live album by multi-instrumentalist Alan Silva, saxophonist Kidd Jordan, and bassist William Parker. It was recorded in May 1999 at the Vision Festival, St. Nicholas of Myra Church in New York City, and was released in 2002 by Boxholder Records.

== Reception ==
Professional ratings
Review scores
Source	Rating
AllMusic	3/5 stars

In a review for AllMusic, David R. Adler wrote: "Together the three players reach ecstatic, uproarious heights, sounding something like late Coltrane meets Bartók. Silva's instrument lends a good deal of symphonic magnitude, its high-pitched string section passages and thundering, timpanic, low-register motifs giving the impression that there are scores of people on-stage, not just three."

Glenn Astarita, writing for All About Jazz, stated: "With this release, the trio's liberating improvisational forays are steered by Silva's complex chord progressions and polytonal mosaics. Throughout this 7-part suite, the musicians pursue a rite of passage that is at times, mind-boggling... Jordan melds furious exchanges with Silva's grand opuses and massive walls of sound... the trio manages to equate turmoil and upheaval with a comprehensive and well-defined sense of purpose. Strongly Recommended!"

Charlie Wilmoth of Dusted Magazine commented: "Silva... hyperactively punches out dense orchestra hits, avalanche-like cymbal crashes and moaning oboe bleats, often all at the same time, loading the mix with weird and joyous layers of sound... Parker's... wounded groans and frantic plucks play a critical role in establishing the mood... Silva... has found a solution to the problem of how to incorporate synthetic sounds into a free jazz context, and while I'm not sure I'd like to hear his solution attempted by a lesser player, I'll be returning to Emancipation Suite #1 again and again."

In an article for Billboard, Steve Graybow wrote that the album, which finds Silva "approximating an entire orchestra on his synthesizer," "can be likened to a well-structured melée, as Silva creates dense orchestrations behind Jordan's dissonant lines, and Parker alternately holds down the bottom and jumps into the fray to trade solos."

== Track listing ==
Composed by Alan Silva, Edward "Kidd" Jordan, and William Parker.

1. "Introduction by Patricia Nicholson Parker" – 0:38

Emancipation Suite #1

2. "Part I: To Free From Bondage" – 10:36
3. "Part II: Deliverance" – 6:52
4. "Part III: Freedom" – 7:12
5. "Part IV: Independence" – 8:59
6. "Part V: Liberation" – 16:48
7. "Coda" – 6:16

== Personnel ==
- Alan Silva – synthesizer
- Kidd Jordan – tenor saxophone
- William Parker – bass
