= On the Run, Live at the Velvet Lounge =

Live album by Fred Anderson
- Released: November 13, 2001
- Recorded: March 25, 2000
- Venue: Velvet Lounge, Chicago
- Genre: Jazz
- Length: 71:02
- Label: Delmark
- Producer: Robert G. Koester

Fred Anderson chronology
Duets 2001 (2001)	On the Run, Live at the Velvet Lounge (2001)	Back at the Velvet Lounge (2003)

On the Run, Live at the Velvet Lounge is an album by American jazz saxophonist Fred Anderson, which was recorded in 2000 at his Chicago club, the Velvet Lounge, and released on Delmark. He's backed by his regular rhythm section of bassist Tatsu Aoki and drummer Hamid Drake.

== Reception ==
Professional ratings
Review scores
Source	Rating
AllMusic	4/5 stars

In his review for AllMusic, Alex Henderson states "Like John Coltrane, Anderson can be long-winded, and like Coltrane, he is such a wealth of creativity and imagination that his excesses can easily be forgiven."

The All About Jazz review by Derek Taylor notes that "Delmark has some explaining to do. Why it’s taken them nearly four decades to record and release Fred Anderson’s debut for the label is a mystery crying out for clarification."

The PopMatters review by Marshall Bowden says "Anderson and his cohorts never call attention to their formidable technique at the expense of driving the music forward and creating an exciting listening experience for the audience. If more jazz musicians worked this way, maybe it would be a more popular musical genre."

== Track listing ==
All compositions by Anderson / Aoki / Drake

1. "Ladies in Love" - 4:31
2. "On the Run" - 16:00
3. "Smooth Velvet" - 19:13
4. "Tatsu's Groove" - 18:37
5. "Hamid's on Fire" - 12:41

== Personnel ==
- Fred Anderson - tenor sax
- Tatsu Aoki - bass
- Hamid Drake - drums
