= The Great Vision Concert =

Live album by Fred Anderson
- Released: 2007
- Recorded: May 22, 2003
- Venue: St. Patrick's Center, New York City
- Genre: Jazz
- Length: 57:12
- Label: Ayler

Fred Anderson chronology
Timeless, Live at the Velvet Lounge (2006)	The Great Vision Concert (2007)	From the River to the Ocean (2007)

The Great Vision Concert is an album by American jazz saxophonist Fred Anderson with bassist Harrison Bankhead, which was recorded live at the 2003 Vision Festival and released four years later on Ayler Records, a Swedish label founded by Jan Ström and Åke Bjurhamn.

== Reception ==
Professional ratings
Review scores
Source	Rating
The Free Jazz Collective	4/5 stars

In a multiple review for All About Jazz Kurt Gottschalk states "This is the relaxed Anderson, stretching out with a friend, in no hurry to go anywhere: three long improvisations (15 to 22 minutes) followed by a 5-minute vamp."

A reviewer for The Free Jazz Collective wrote: "it is great from beginning to end... it is inspiring music, fun to hear, a joy for the attentive listener. Technical and musical skills abound, but the players' main focus is on the common project: the musical end result."

The authors of the 2008 Britannica Book of the Year called the album "some of his finest recent work."

== Track listing ==
All compositions by Fred Anderson

1. "Cloverleaf" - 15:26
2. "Wandering" - 22:29
3. "Trying to Cath the Rabbit" - 14:14
4. "The Strut" - 4:56

== Personnel ==
- Fred Anderson - tenor sax
- Harrison Bankhead - bass
