= Fred Anderson Quartet Volume One =

Live album by Fred Anderson
- Released: 1999
- Recorded: 1998
- Venue: Velvet Lounge, Chicago
- Genre: Jazz
- Length: 70:18
- Label: Asian Improv
- Producer: Fred Anderson, Clarence Bright, Tatsu Aoki

Fred Anderson chronology
Live at the Velvet Lounge (1999)	Fred Anderson Quartet Volume One (1999)	The Milwaukee Tapes Vol. 1 (2000)

Fred Anderson Quartet Volume One is an album by American jazz saxophonist Fred Anderson which was recorded live during the 1998 season at the Chicago club owned by Anderson, the Velvet Lounge, and released on the Asian Improv label. The Anderson's Quartet features longtime partner trumpeter Bill Brimfield, drummer Chad Taylor and Asian American bassist Tatsu Aoki.

== Reception ==
Professional ratings
Review scores
Source	Rating
AllMusic	3/5 stars
The Penguin Guide to Jazz Recordings	3/4 stars

In her review for AllMusic, Joslyn Layne states about Anderson that "His horn has a time-carved warmth that somewhat recalls the warm sound of Hank Mobley and early Ben Webster, but remains entirely Anderson's own sound; when he blows, you can hear all the years of playing behind that sound."

The All About Jazz review by Mark Corroto says "Anderson sounds like a mellow Ornette Coleman on tenor, especially with the addition of Bill Brimfield on trumpet... The grooves, while not laid back, are some of the most accessible and enjoyable free music I’ve heard."

== Track listing ==
All compositions by Fred Anderson

1. "The Moon Song" - 14:10
2. "Dark Day" - 10:57
3. "Get It Right" - 22:22
4. "Three on Two" - 22:49

== Personnel ==
- Fred Anderson - tenor sax
- Bill Brimfield - trumpet
- Chad Taylor - drums
- Tatsu Aoki - bass
