= Live in New York =

Live in New York may refer to:

- Hot Swing Trio: Live in New York, 2005 album by Mark O'Connor's Hot Swing Trio
- Live in New York (Archie Shepp and Roswell Rudd album), released in 2001
- Live in New York (The Doors live album), 6-disc box set released in 2009
- Live In New York (The Doors sampler), 2nd disc of The Doors: Box Set, released in 1997
- Live in New York (Fred McDowell album), released in 1972
- Live in New York (James Brown album), 1981 double album
- Live in New York (Joe Cocker album), released in 1981
- Live in New York (Julius Hemphill and Abdul Wadud album), released in 1978
- Live in New York (Kylie Minogue album), released in 2009
- Live in New York (Laurie Anderson album), 2-CD album released in 2002
- Live in New York (Nektar album), released in 1977
- Live in New York (Positive Knowledge album), released in 2003
- Live in New York (Sonny Sharrock album), released in 1989
- Summer in the City: Live in New York, 2000 album by Joe Jackson and Sheldon Steiger

== See also ==
- Live in New York City (disambiguation)
- Live in NYC (disambiguation)
- MTV Unplugged in New York, a 1994 LP by Nirvana
