= Fred Anderson Quartet Volume Two =

Live album by Fred Anderson
- Released: 2000
- Recorded: 1999
- Venue: Velvet Lounge, Chicago
- Genre: Jazz
- Length: 128:04
- Label: Asian Improv
- Producer: Fred Anderson, Clarence Bright, Tatsu Aoki

Fred Anderson chronology
2 Days in April (2000)	Fred Anderson Quartet Volume Two (2000)	Duets 2001 (2001)

Fred Anderson Quartet Volume Two is a double album by American jazz saxophonist Fred Anderson which was recorded live during the 1999 season at the Chicago club owned by Anderson, the Velvet Lounge, and released on the Asian Improv label. Anderson's Quartet features longtime partner drummer Hamid Drake, guitarist Jeff Parker and Asian American bassist Tatsu Aoki.

== Reception ==
Professional ratings
Review scores
Source	Rating
AllMusic	4/5 stars

In his review for AllMusic, Alex Henderson states "The Chicagoan was 70 when these excellent performances were recorded, and he continues to play with the authority of someone who is very much in his prime."

The All About Jazz review by Glenn Astarita says "Mr. Anderson possesses a deep, rugged tone while portraying a starkly lyrical yet altogether vigorous approach to his craft while often performing in a workmanlike, no-nonsense manner."

== Track listing ==
All compositions by Fred Anderson

Disc One:

1. "Look Out!" - 15:58
2. "Road Trip" - 37:40
3. "Tomato Song" - 12:11

Disc Two:

1. "December 4th" - 15:04
2. "Exotic Dreams" - 22:31
3. "Jeff's Turnaround" - 34:41

== Personnel ==
- Fred Anderson - tenor sax
- Hamid Drake - drums, percussion
- Jeff Parker - guitar
- Tatsu Aoki - bass
