= Back at the Velvet Lounge =

Live album by Fred Anderson
- Released: November 10, 2003
- Recorded: November 18, 2002
- Venue: Velvet Lounge, Chicago
- Genre: Jazz
- Length: 65:01
- Label: Delmark
- Producer: Robert G. Koester

Fred Anderson chronology
On the Run, Live at the Velvet Lounge (2001)	Back at the Velvet Lounge (2003)	Back Together Again (2004)

Back at the Velvet Lounge is an album by American jazz saxophonist Fred Anderson, which was recorded in 2002 and released on Delmark. This second installment on Bob Koester's label of live recordings made at Fred's own club, the Velvet Lounge, features the young trumpeter Maurice Brown making his first appearance on CD, Chicago Underground's guitarist Jeff Parker and drummer Chad Taylor, and bassists Tatsu Aoki and Harrison Bankhead.

== Reception ==
Professional ratings
Review scores
Source	Rating
AllMusic	4/5 stars
Tom Hull	A−

In his review for AllMusic, Scott Yanow states "Although technically 'avant-garde', the music on this lively outing should interest straight-ahead jazz fans too, for these Chicago-based musicians are all worthy of greater recognition."

The All About Jazz review by Derek Taylor notes that "Hearing Anderson (and his friends) blow can be a cathartic and intensely enjoyable experience, especially in person in the funky confines of the Lounge. But his palette is limited by choice and has thus far only rarely allowed for substantial deviations from standard vernacular."

The JazzTimes review by Nate Chinen says "Back at the Velvet Lounge has its scattered failings, but there are quite a few moments elsewhere in the set -like Anderson's choruses on the laid-back 'Syene'- that manage to compensate."

Reviewing for The Village Voice in September 2004, Tom Hull said of Anderson's performance, "On his home court, with a full band behind him, he feels comfortable enough to toss us a soft one."

== Track listing ==
All compositions by Fred Anderson

1. "Fougeux" - 12:59
2. "Olivia" - 15:29
3. "Job Market Blues" - 13:43
4. "Syene" - 10:25
5. "King Fish" - 12:25

== Personnel ==
- Fred Anderson - tenor sax
- Maurice Brown - trumpet
- Jeff Parker - guitar
- Harrison Bankhead - acoustic guitar on 3, bass on 1-2
- Tatsu Aoki - bass on 2-5
- Chad Taylor - drums
