= Birthday Live 2000 =

Live album by Fred Anderson Trio
- Released: 2009
- Recorded: March 22 and 25, 2000
- Venue: The Velvet Lounge, Chicago, Illinois
- Genre: Free jazz
- Label: Asian Improv Records

Fred Anderson chronology
21st Century Chase (2009)	Birthday Live 2000 (2009)	Black Horn Long Gone (2010)

Birthday Live 2000 is a live album by saxophonist Fred Anderson. It was recorded at the Velvet Lounge in Chicago, Illinois, on March 22 and 25, 2000, and was released in 2009 by Asian Improv Records as a limited edition "official bootleg." On the album, Anderson is joined by bassist Tatsu Aoki and drummer Chad Taylor.

== Reception ==
In a review for All About Jazz, Jeff Stockton wrote: "Birthday Live 2000 captures Anderson as a steamroller running roughshod over the bedrock rhythms established by Taylor's skilled work around the rims and Aoki's resonating neck-bending... it's Anderson's authoritative blues-drenched sound and boundless creativity that whip Aoki and Taylor into shape."

Ken Waxman, writing for Jazz Word, stated: "Both incendiary and knife-sharp, [Anderson's] carved-up timbres partition still further as he churns out double-and-triple tongued trills plus jagged Woody Woodpecker-like bites. Rappelling from just below the ligature down through the bow to the bell of his horn and back up again, the saxophonist's glissandi radiate every which way. His explorations are backed by slapping bass strings plus opposite sticking and cross pulsing from Taylor."

A writer for the Downtown Music Gallery commented: "There's something about the kind of conversations you can have with old friends--you can skip straight to the heart of the matter. As is the case with this trio."

== Track listing ==
1. "Track 1" – 22:40
2. "Track 2" – 13:14
3. "Track 3" – 14:24

== Personnel ==
- Fred Anderson – tenor saxophone
- Tatsu Aoki – bass
- Chad Taylor – drums
