= Destiny (Marilyn Crispell album) =

Live album by Marilyn Crispell, Fred Anderson, Hamid Drake
- Released: 1995
- Recorded: April 8, 1994
- Venue: HotHouse, Chicago
- Genre: Jazz
- Length: 66:41
- Label: Okka Disk
- Producer: Marilyn Crispell

Marilyn Crispell chronology
Spring Tour (1995)	Destiny (1995)	Live at Mills College, 1995 (1995)

Fred Anderson chronology
Vintage Duets (1994)	Destiny (1995)	Birdhouse (1996)

Destiny is an album by American jazz pianist Marilyn Crispell with saxophonist Fred Anderson and drummer Hamid Drake recorded in the 1994 "Women of the New Jazz" festival at Chicago’s HotHouse and released on Okka Disk.

== Background ==
First time she heard Anderson playing tenor sax at the Velvet Lounge, Crispell knew she would work with him. Asked with whom she wanted to play at the festival, she took the opportunity. Crispell and Drake had already worked together as a trio with German saxophonist Peter Brötzmann, playing a short run of concerts that resulted in the album Hyperion, released on Music & Arts.The three musicians had played together only in a studio rehearsal the day before the live show.

Anderson and Drake recorded a duet at this session that was included on Anderson's Birdhouse (1996).

== Reception ==
Professional ratings
Review scores
Source	Rating
AllMusic	3/5 stars
The Penguin Guide to Jazz	3.5/4 stars
Down Beat	4.5/5 stars
Tom Hull – on the Web	B+

In her review for AllMusic, Joslyn Layne states "this is an incredible performance by a stunning group of musicians whose skill and chemistry completely sidestep the fact that this is only the second time that these three great jazz improvisers ever played together."

The Down Beat review by Jon Andrews says that Anderson "communicates without the harshness and split tones that alienated many listener in that era" and notes that Crispell "displays a broad range of expression from percussive rage to crystalline delicacy."

The authors of the Penguin Guide to Jazz Recordings awarded the album 3½ stars, and commented: "this seems like a relationship written in the stars, and it allows them to build up whole areas of interaction in which the exchange of ideas is almost too fast to follow. Drake provides sterling accompaniment and... often takes the initiative in breaking up Crispell's long, suspended lines into shorter, more discursive sections."

== Track listing ==
All compositions by Marilyn Crispell, Hamid Drake, Fred Anderson

1. "Destiny 1" - 14:16
2. "Destiny 2" - 8:26
3. "Destiny 3" - 7:29
4. "Destiny 4" - 13:36
5. "Destiny 5" - 14:37
6. "Destiny 6" - 8:17

== Personnel ==
- Marilyn Crispell - piano
- Fred Anderson - tenor sax
- Hamid Drake - percussion
