= Live in NYC =

Live in NYC may refer to:

- Live in NYC (Jane's Addiction album), album and DVD released in 2013
- Live in NYC 12/31/92, 2006 album by Pearl Jam
- Live in NYC - 1975: Red Patent Leather, 1985 album by New York Dolls
- Live in NYC '97, 1998 album by Johnny Winter
- Live In NYC, 1996 album by Alan Licht with Loren Mazzacane Connors
- Live in NYC, 2009 album by Chris Brokaw and Wrekmeister Harmonies
- Live in NYC, 2008 album by Dana Fuchs
- Live in NYC, 2008 album by Dan Donnelly (singer)
- Live in NYC, 2013 Grammy-nominated album by Gretchen Parlato
- Live in NYC, 5-song CD released in 2004 by Toothless George & His One-Man Band
- Live in NYC, 2011 album by VAST
- Brazilian Girls: Live in NYC , 2005 video by the Brazilian Girls
- Oceania: Live in NYC, 2013 concert film by The Smashing Pumpkins
- The Living Room - Live in NYC - Vol.1, 2002 compilation CD recorded at The Living Room
- Too Tough to Die Live in NYC, 2003 album by Dee Dee Ramone
- You + Me – Live in NYC, 2013 album by The Polyphonic Spree

== See also ==
- Live in New York City (disambiguation)
- Live in New York (disambiguation)
