= Birdhouse (disambiguation) =

A birdhouse or nest box is an artificial nest for birds.

Birdhouse may also refer to:

- Birdhouse (album), by Fred Anderson
- Birdhouse Skateboards, founded by Tony Hawk and Per Welinder in 1992
- "Birdhouse in Your Soul", a song by They Might Be Giants
