= Live at the Velvet Lounge Volume III =

Live album by Fred Anderson
- Released: 2008
- Recorded: October 13, 2007
- Venue: Velvet Lounge, Chicago
- Genre: Jazz
- Length: 73:49
- Label: Asian Improv
- Producer: Fred Anderson

Fred Anderson chronology
From the River to the Ocean (2007)	Live at the Velvet Lounge Volume III (2008)	A Night at the Velvet Lounge Made in Chicago 2007 (2009)

Live at the Velvet Lounge Volume Three is an album by American jazz saxophonist Fred Anderson which was recorded during the 2007 Chicago Asian American Jazz Festival at the club owned by Anderson, the Velvet Lounge, and released on the Asian Improv label. Anderson's Quartet features San Franciscan saxophonist Francis Wong, drummer Chad Taylor and bassist Tatsu Aoki.

== Reception ==
The All About Jazz review by Jeff Stockton states "On second saxophone, Wong sounds like an Anderson student, his lines just a little bit less weighty than the mentor's but equally well-thought-out and coherent, seamlessly complementing Anderson's lead."

In an article for the Chicago Reader Bill Meyer notes that "Anderson and Wong have similar tones but contrasting styles: Anderson is more rhythmic and gives each note in his dancing figures an individual emphasis, while Wong works slurs and eerie vocalizations in his horn’s upper register."

== Track listing ==
1. "Andersonville" - 14:17
2. "Acceleration" - 9:47
3. "Beyond the Bridge" - 14:45
4. "Positive Changes" - 9:55
5. "Best Time of Life" - 10:13
6. "Discreet Identifier" - 14:52

== Personnel ==
- Fred Anderson - tenor sax
- Francis Wong - tenor sax
- Chad Taylor - drums
- Tatsu Aoki - bass
