= The Power of Light =

The Power of Light may refer to:

- The Power of Light (film)
- The Power of Light (album)
