= 21st Century Chase =

Live album by Fred Anderson
- Released: September 22, 2009
- Recorded: March 22, 2009
- Venues: Velvet Lounge, Chicago
- Genre: Jazz
- Length: 66:26
- Label: Delmark
- Producer: Robert G. Koester

Fred Anderson chronology
Staying in the Game (2009)	21st Century Chase (2009)	Birthday Live 2000 (2009)

21st Century Chase is an album by American jazz saxophonist Fred Anderson, which was recorded in 2009 and released on Delmark. This fourth live recording on Bob Koester's label made at Fred's own club, the Velvet Lounge, documents the finale to a week of concerts honoring Anderson's 80th birthday. He is joined by New Orleans saxophonist Kidd Jordan, guitarist Jeff Parker, bassist Harrison Bankhead and drummer Chad Taylor. The last piece is dedicated to the AACM drummer Alvin Fielder. The event was also filmed and issued on DVD with a bonus track, “Gone But Not Forgotten”, with guest bassist Henry Grimes.

== Reception ==
Professional ratings
Review scores
Source	Rating
AllMusic	4/5 stars

In his review for AllMusic, Sean Westergaard states:

The night really belongs to the two tenors: Fred, with his huge, burly tone, and Kidd's unsurpassed abilities at the upper end of the horn's range make for some exciting music making. These guys are perfect foils because their styles are so complementary... Terrific stuff.

— Westergaard, Sean. Fred Anderson - 21st Century Chase: Review at AllMusic. Retrieved November 23, 2014.

The JazzTimes review by David Whitels says:

Fellow tenorman Kidd Jordan is the perfect foil for Anderson. Though best known for his high-end overtone fusillades, he’s equally capable of unleashing complex, full-bodied middle-register lines. Charged with churchy fervor and a forward-driving impetus, his patterns weave through Anderson’s dancing circles, merging and melding into new shapes and shards.

— Whitels, David. "21st Century Chase review". JazzTimes.

The PopMatters review by Andrew Zender claims:

While he’s backed by a top-notch group, Anderson is the star here. His ability to command a stage —but to also yield to those making music with him— is impressive.

— Zender, Andrew. "21st Century Chase review". PopMatters.

== Track listing ==
All compositions by Fred Anderson

1. "21st Century Chase Pt. I" - 36:13
2. "21st Century Chase Pt. II" - 14:13
3. "Ode to Alvin Fielder" - 16:00

== Personnel ==
- Fred Anderson - tenor sax
- Kidd Jordan - tenor sax
- Jeff Parker - guitar
- Harrison Bankhead - bass
- Chad Taylor - drums

== Sources ==
- Whitels, David. "21st Century Chase review". JazzTimes.
- Zender, Andrew. "21st Century Chase review". PopMatters.
