= Beneath Tones Floor =

Live album by Oluyemi Thomas, Sirone, and Michael Wimberly
- Released: 2010
- Recorded: 2008
- Venue: Brecht Forum, New York City
- Genre: Free jazz
- Label: NoBusiness Records
- Producer: Danas Mikailionis

Beneath Tones Floor is a live album by reed player Oluyemi Thomas, bassist Sirone, and drummer Michael Wimberly recorded at the Brecht Forum in New York City in 2008. It was released in 2010 by NoBusiness Records.

== Reception ==
Professional ratings
Review scores
Source	Rating
All About Jazz	4/5 stars

In a review for All About Jazz, John Sharpe wrote: "Part of the strength of this set... is the tension created as the three never totally cut loose. They simmer with fierce intent, occasionally flaring but avoiding total combustion. Another of the main attractions is the intersection between Sirone's rich so-deep-it-is-almost-subterranean bass and Thomas' bass clarinet. Working through insistent phrases with the vocalized edge of an Eric Dolphy, the reed man overlays a nervy yelp in the upper register onto his gruff exclamations, while he is nasal on the musette but full-toned and astringent on soprano saxophone. Wimberly colors the exchanges, stoking the fires when needed, but largely supplies unselfish support for the double act of celebrated protagonists."

In a separate All About Jazz article, Tim Niland commented: "this beautiful package... makes for a fitting send off for the great bassist Sirone who passed away not long after this recording was completed... the music unfolds gradually, with a sense of calm dignity that shows the musicians compassion for the performance and the Cosmos at large. There is spaciousness amongst the trio that allows their music to develop in an organic and unhurried manner... The trio's ability to improvise together as a collective unit and to sculpt the sound world around them makes this an impressive recording that deserves careful consideration and close listening."

Writing for Moment's Notice, Ed Hazell stated: "Oluyemi Thomas has said that music has an element of prayer in it. That's certainly true of the music on this album... its supplication, compassion, and sanctified joy is prayerful indeed. It's also artfully contrived free jazz improvisation that makes brilliant use of contrasts in color and texture, instrumentation, and structure... The trio... are sure hands at free jazz improvisation. Each improvisation develops organically at its own pace, and without any fixed plan... Thomas, Sirone, and Wimberly play with a fervor imparted by a belief that what they're creating is more majestic, vaster, than the individual. There's a genuine feeling of praise and celebration, a hope borne of faith in a spiritual realm, and an energy and urgency that's needed to break the bonds and illusions of this world and reach a higher truth. Beautiful stuff."

Ken Waxman, in an article for JazzWord, remarked: "Sirone's tough strumming and col legno patterning add the appropriate connecting thread to the 10 tracks which flow seamlessly into one another. Wimberly... knows exactly how to color the proceedings; using cross sticking, focused rim shots and clattering rumbles... Sirone's death means this rare example of cohesive, in-the-moment improvising can never be repeated. Luckily someone had the foresight to record this program."

Clifford Allen, writing for Paris Transatlantic, commented: "While Sirone is not the leader here, the recording presents him front and center, directing the improvisations with furious growling wisps and surges that crackle with electricity and dovetail with Thomas's bass clarinet squawk... Sirone was never as well documented as he should have been, so it's all the more wonderful that this fine release captures his artistry within this very sympathetic trio."

== Track listing ==
1. "Beneath Tones Floor" – 6:47
2. "...Where Sacred Lives" – 3:37
3. "Mystic Way" – 6:36
4. "Reflections Of Silence, Painting Silence, Images Of Silence" – 9:27
5. "Dream Worlds" – 3:22
6. "Newest Happiness And Joy" – 3:23
7. "Rotation 360 Degrees Hummingbird" – 6:49
8. "Heavenly Wisdom" – 8:50
9. "Silence On The Move" – 6:35
10. "Spirit Of Ifa" – 6:43

== Personnel ==
- Oluyemi Thomas – bass clarinet, flute, soprano saxophone, musette, percussion
- Sirone – bass
- Michael Wimberly – drums, percussion
