= Black Horn Long Gone =

Studio album by Fred Anderson
- Released: 2010
- Recorded: January 1993
- Studios: Sparrow Sound Design, Chicago
- Genre: Jazz
- Length: 61:11
- Label: Southport
- Producer: Fred Anderson

Fred Anderson chronology
Birthday Live 2000 (2009)	Black Horn Long Gone (2010)	Quintessential Birthday Trio Vol. II (2015)

Black Horn Long Gone is an album by American jazz saxophonist Fred Anderson recorded in 1993 but not issued until 2010 by the Chicago-based Southport label.

== Background ==
The title refers to the Selmer tenor saxophone Anderson played on this four-hour session. It features Anderson's trio with longtime associates in the AACM, bassist Malachi Favors Maghostut, a member of the Art Ensemble of Chicago, and drummer Ajaramu (aka AJ Shelton), a veteran of the bop era. Both Favors and Ajaramu died before the release of the album. The last piece is an unaccompanied solo homage to saxophonist Clifford Jordan, who would die only two months later.

== Reception ==
Professional ratings
Review scores
Source	Rating
AllMusic	3.5/5 stars

In his review for AllMusic, Alex Henderson states "Anderson plays with a lot of passion and conviction on avant-garde originals like 'Saxoon', 'The Strut Time', 'Bernice', and 'Wandering'; his playing is quite free and uninhibited." The All About Jazz review by Francis Lo Kee states "For those interested in investigating Anderson's great playing and original compositions, Black Horn Long Gone is an outstanding place to start."

== Track listing ==
All compositions and improvisations by Fred Anderson

1. "Wandering" - 5:58
2. "Our Theme" - 6:27
3. "Saxoon" - 6:41
4. "Three on Two" - 10:00
5. "Bernice" - 9:26
6. "The Strut Time" - 8:30
7. "Malachi's Tune" - 6:06
8. "Ode to Clifford Jordan" - 8:03

== Personnel ==
- Fred Anderson - tenor sax
- Malachi Favors Maghostut - bass
- Ajaramu (AJ Shelton) - drums
