= The Missing Link (Fred Anderson album) =

Studio album by Fred Anderson
- Released: 1984
- Recorded: September 17, 1979
- Studio: Pierce Arrow Recorders, Evanston
- Genre: Jazz
- Length: 47:40 (LP); 62:28 (CD)
- Label: Nessa
- Producer: Fred Anderson, Chuck Nessa

Fred Anderson chronology
Dark Day (1979)	The Missing Link (1984)	Vintage Duets (1994)

The Missing Link is an album by American jazz saxophonist Fred Anderson, recorded in 1979 but not issued until 1984 by Nessa Records.

== Background ==
Originally scheduled as an Anderson's working quartet recording, trumpeter Billy Brimfield was in California unable to make the session, and Anderson decided to go ahead with the date, adding percussionist Adam Rudolph at Hamid Drake's suggestion. Larry Hayrod was then a newcomer to the quartet, replacing bassist Steven Palmore, who had left for New York after a trip to Europe with one of Anderson's ensembles. The CD reissue adds a bonus track, Drake's composition "Tabla Peace".

== Reception ==
Professional ratings
Review scores
Source	Rating
AllMusic	4.5/5 stars
The Penguin Guide to Jazz	3.5/4 stars

In his review for AllMusic, Thom Jurek states that "Anderson is pushing the blues; however elongated and angular, they are recognizable as such and are the spiritual conscience of all the music he plays here." The Penguin Guide to Jazz says that "if he is a missing link, what he's bridging is the gap between the spare, blues-soaked sound of early Ornette and the clean-sweep radicalism of AACM."

== Track listing ==
All compositions by Fred Anderson except as indicated

1. "Twilight" - 16:37
2. "A Ballad for Rita" - 13:52
3. "The Bull" - 17:11

Bonus track on CD

4. "Tabla Peace" (Hamid Drake)- 14:48

== Personnel ==
- Fred Anderson - tenor sax
- Larry Hayrod - bass
- Hamid Drake - drums
- Adam Rudolph - percussion
