= Constellation (nightclub) =

Performing arts club in Chicago, Illinois

Coordinates: 41°56′17″N 87°41′16″W

Constellation is a performing arts club in Chicago, Illinois located at 3111 N. Western Ave, "with an emphasis on forward-thinking practices particularly in the areas of jazz, improvised, experimental, and contemporary classical music."

Constellation was founded in 2013 by Mike Reed, a Chicago-based drummer and composer, on the site of the former Viaduct Theater. The modern Constellation incorporates elements from the defunct theater, including its recessed pipes, its raised stage, and technical booth. Its odd seats are repurposed from the remodel of the Film Center in 2013. Reed was originally Constellation's for-profit (nominally) owner and then, from 2018 through 2026, its nonprofit organization president.

Constellation has replaced, and expanded upon, the now closed Velvet Lounge as a hub of avant garde jazz and improvised music in Chicago. Decor from the Velvet was repurposed in the new Constellation space, including the bar. Musicians who have played at Constellation include Fred Hersch, Bobby Broom, Ari Brown, Josh Berman, and many others. Many of these shows are available to livestream on Constellation's YouTube, though a suggested virtual ticket of $5 is encouraged.

Constellation hosts a number of recurring series, including the New Music Frequency series (programmed by Berlin-based Chicagoan Peter Margarsek), the 2x4 (programmed by Julian Kirschner), Dimensions & Extensions (programmed by Julian Kirschner), and the Winter Solstice concerts.

Sound and Gravity, a festival launched in 2025 following the death of Pitchfork and Links Hall, serves as an annual fundraiser for Constellation and takes place at several venues in Roscoe Village every September.

Reed co-owns another Chicago jazz club called The Hungry Brain.

== See also ==
- List of jazz clubs
