= Live in New York (Positive Knowledge album) =

Live album by Positive Knowledge
- Released: 2003
- Recorded: May 31, 2001
- Venue: Vision Festival, New York City
- Genre: Free jazz
- Label: Edgetone; EDT4018
- Producer: Ijeoma Thomas, Michael Wimberly, Oluyemi Thomas

Live in New York is a live album by Positive Knowledge, the jazz group founded and led by reed player Oluyemi Thomas and poet Ijeoma Chinue Thomas. It was recorded in May 2001 at the Vision Festival in New York City, and was released in 2003 by Edgetone Records. On the album, the duo are joined by bassist Wilber Morris and drummer Michael Wimberly.

== Reception ==
Professional ratings
Review scores
Source	Rating
AllMusic	4/5 stars

In a review for AllMusic, Steve Loewy wrote: "the group projects the liquefied, eclectic, even elastic, approach of Oluyemi Thomas' reeds which, no matter how vigorous the attack, seem to speak with a relaxed confidence. He locks horns often with Ijeoma; and her vocal gymnastics simulate the braying of the saxophone. She rises above the rubble like a confident prophetess who knows she is right... This is one of those rare occasions where the mix of poetry and jazz succeeds on so many levels; setting an example for the genre."

Writing for All About Jazz, Jerry D'Souza commented: "The music here has moments of great inspiration... Oluyemi Thomas churns a torrid air with squiggles, cries and yowls when he has 'Direct Focus'; Wimberly accents lightly, letting the horn do the singing, and then gradually kicks up the tempo. Thomas shows a distinct flair for heady improvisations constantly stoking the fire of changes."

Improvijazzation Nation's Dick Metcalf stated: "You don't get more soulful than this!... Ijeoma Thomas does the spoken-word/scat in 'free-spirit' mode, riding the waves like th' surfer of soul(s) that she is... Oluyemi Thomas' reed & wind performances are totally complimented by drums from Michael Wimberly & bass by Wilber Morris... A great jazz & poetry outing that gets our MOST HIGHLY RECOMMENDED rating… it’s a classic that you'll have to have!"

== Track listing ==
1. "Proofs (For Alan Silva)" – 10:31
2. "Secrets of Imperfection" – 8:27
3. "The Upper Chamber House of Prayer" – 6:59
4. "Righteous Intent" – 5:36
5. "Ask Eric / Iron Soul (For Eric Dolphy)" – 4:13
6. "Mother Africa (For Wilber Morris)" – 7:11
7. "In One Heart (For Jeanne Lee)" – 8:08
8. "Direct Focus" – 8:28
9. "Beauty is Hidden" – 8:32

== Personnel ==
- Oluyemi Thomas – bass clarinet, C-melody saxophone, soprano saxophone, musette, flute, percussion
- Ijeoma Thomas – vocals, poetry, percussion
- Wilber Morris – bass
- Michael Wimberly – drums, percussion
