= Fred Anderson / DKV Trio =

Studio album by Fred Anderson
- Released: 1997
- Recorded: December 3, 1996
- Studio: Airwave, Chicago
- Genre: Jazz
- Length: 47:54
- Label: Okka Disk
- Producer: Ken Vandermark, Bruno Johnson

Fred Anderson chronology
| Fred Chicago Chamber Music (1997) | Fred Anderson / DKV Trio (1997) | Live at the Velvet Lounge (1999) |

Ken Vandermark chronology
| Single Piece Flow (1997) | Fred Anderson / DKV Trio (1997) | All Night Burner (1997) |

Fred Anderson / DKV Trio is an album by the American jazz saxophonist Fred Anderson with the DKV Trio, composed of drummer Hamid Drake, bassist Kent Kessler and reedist Ken Vandermark. The album was recorded in 1996 and released on Okka Disk. The DKV Trio formed in the summer of 1994 and started performing at Anderson's Velvet Lounge very early in their career. Those meetings led to the idea of doing a record with Fred. "Black Woman", a classic Anderson composition that appears on several of his other recordings, is a tenor sax duet.

== Reception ==
Professional ratings
Review scores
| Source | Rating |
|---|---|
| AllMusic | 4.5/5 stars |
| The Penguin Guide to Jazz | 3/4 stars |

In her review for AllMusic, Joslyn Layne states that "Fred Anderson & DKV Trio cannot disappoint any free-jazz fan; with its lyrical beauty, passion, and warmth, it will convert many a jazz enthusiast who thinks 'free' means 'squalling.'" The Penguin Guide to Jazz states: "The DKV Trio collaboration was an important turning point in perceptions of Fred Anderson's music, since these younger player were leading something of a charge in contemporary Chicagoan jazz."

== Track listing ==
All compositions by Fred Anderson

1. "Planet E" - 8:30
2. "Aaron's Tune" - 5:55
3. "Black Woman" - 6:09
4. "Our Theme" - 5:56
5. "Dark Day" - 10:54
6. "Lady's in Love" - 10:30

== Personnel ==
- Fred Anderson - tenor saxophone
- Ken Vandermark - reeds
- Kent Kessler - bass
- Hamid Drake - percussion
