= Fred Anderson (musician) =

American jazz saxophonist (1929–2010)

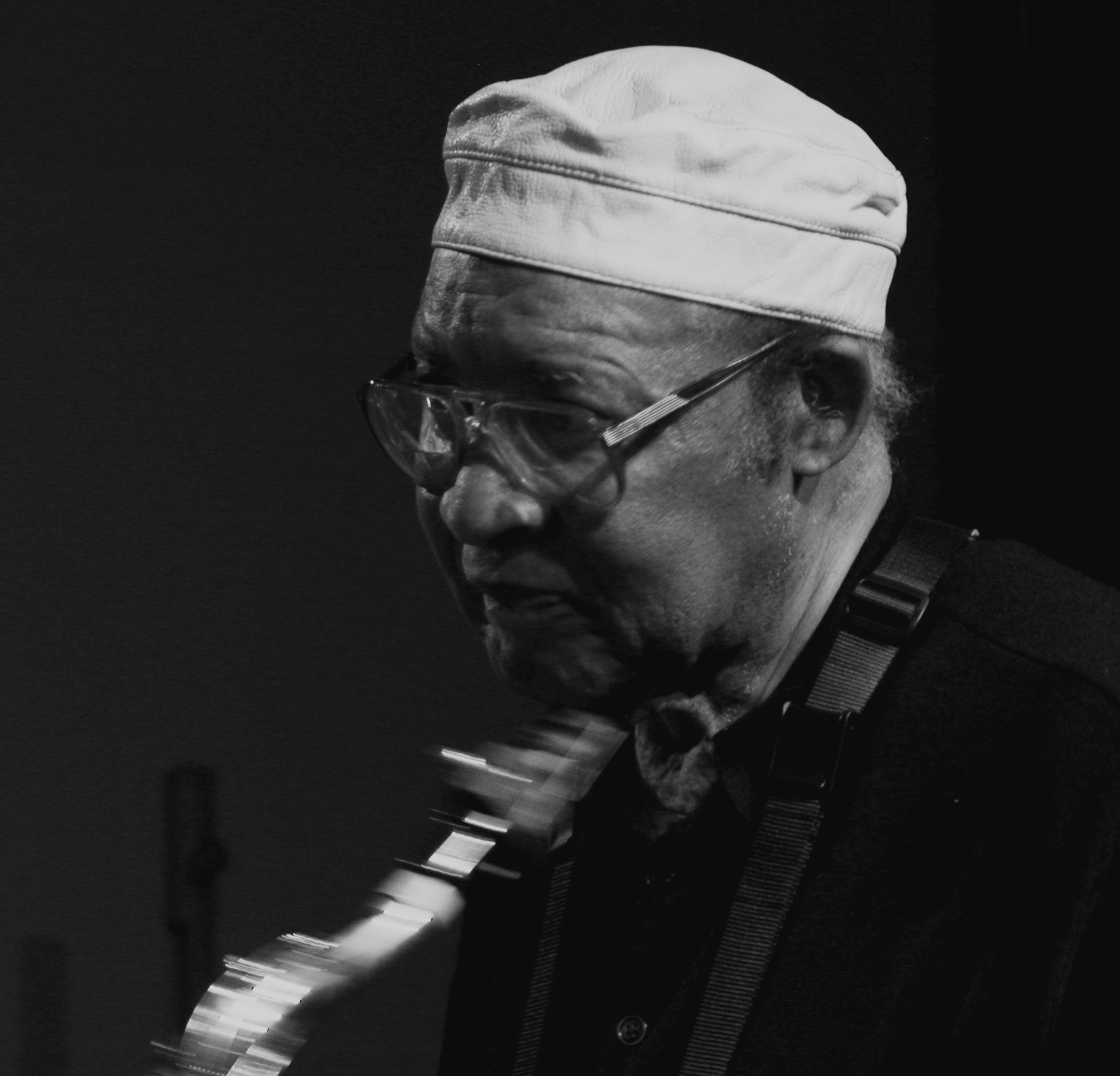
- Fred Anderson in 2005; photo by Seth Tisue

Background information
- Born: March 22, 1929; Monroe, Louisiana, U.S.
- Died: June 24, 2010 (aged 81) Chicago, Illinois, U.S.
- Genres: Jazz
- Occupation: Musician
- Instrument: Saxophone

Fred Anderson (March 22, 1929 – June 24, 2010) was an American jazz tenor saxophonist who was based in Chicago, Illinois. Anderson's playing was rooted in the swing music and hard bop idioms, but he also incorporated innovations from free jazz. Anderson was also noted for having mentored numerous young musicians. Critic Ben Ratliff called him "a father figure of experimental jazz in Chicago". Writer John Corbett referred to him as "scene caretaker, underground booster, indefatigable cultural worker, quiet force for good." In 2001, author John Litweiler called Anderson "the finest tenor saxophonist in free jazz/underground jazz/outside jazz today."

== Biography ==
Anderson was born in Monroe, Louisiana. When he was ten, his parents separated, and he moved to Evanston, Illinois, where he initially lived with his mother and aunt in a one-room apartment. When Anderson was a teenager, a friend introduced him to the music of Charlie Parker, and he soon decided he wanted to play saxophone, purchasing his first instrument for $45. He listened to Lester Young, Johnny Hodges, Dexter Gordon, Gene Ammons, and Illinois Jacquet, all of whom would influence his playing. He also heard Young and Parker in concert on multiple occasions. Unlike many musicians at the time, Anderson did not play with dance bands or school ensembles, and instead focused on practicing, taking private lessons, and studying music theory at the Roy Knapp Conservatory in Chicago, all the while supporting his family by working as a waiter. He also began making an effort to develop a personal sound on his instrument, with the goal of combining Ammons' "big sound" with Parker's speed. Regarding Parker's influence, Anderson stated: "I tried to figure out how he was doing certain things - not so much the notes that he was playing. He had a unique way about placing things." He also recalled: "Charlie Parker was one of the freest musicians I had ever heard... [his] technique was superb. Each one of the notes would just come out and hit you... His music was so involved. It was hard. It's still hard." At around this time, he began to develop a series of exercises which he incorporated into his daily practice routine, and which eventually became a book titled "Exercises for the Creative Musician".

In the early 1960s, Anderson began listening to and studying the music of Ornette Coleman, and immediately related Coleman's playing to that of Charlie Parker. He recalled: "When I heard Ornette Coleman back in those days... I knew exactly what he was doing. It wasn’t strange to me. I knew exactly where he was coming from." At around this time, influenced by Coleman, he formed a piano-less band with trumpeter Bill Brimfield, with whom he had been practicing since 1957, bassist Bill Fletcher, and drummer Vernon Thomas, playing a mixture of bebop standards and Anderson originals. In 1963, Anderson began participating in weekly jam sessions in Chicago, where he met Roscoe Mitchell, Joseph Jarman, and Richard Abrams, with whom he began discussing the idea of forming a new organization to promote their music. In 1965, the AACM was born, with Anderson as one of its earliest members. (As per George E. Lewis, Anderson was not a charter member, but attended the early meetings and got in on the ground floor.) On August 16, 1965, Anderson played on the first AACM event as part of the Joseph Jarman Quintet, which also featured Brimfield as well as bassist Charles Clark and drummer Arthur Reed. In late 1966, Anderson participated in the recording of Jarman's debut album, Song For, and in 1968, he played on Jarman's As If It Were the Seasons. Both albums were released on the Delmark label.

In the late 1960s, when many of his AACM colleagues moved to Europe, Anderson chose to remain behind, supporting his wife and three young children by working at a rug company, practicing his instrument, and heading the AACM's Evanston chapter with Brimfield. Around 1972 he formed the Fred Anderson Sextet, with trombonist George E. Lewis, reedist Douglas Ewart, bassist Felix Blackmon, drummer Hamid Drake (then known as Hank), and vocalist Iqua Colson, all of whom were much younger than Anderson. Paul Steinbeck of the University of Chicago wrote: "These performers were a full generation younger than Anderson and comparatively inexperienced, yet he granted them considerable creative agency as members of his band... The expressive multiplicity and non-hierarchic social structure promoted by Anderson made his 1970s band resemble a 'mutuality' - a special kind of collective enterprise that requires its members to achieve a 'high degree of autonomy' while maintaining a sense of 'full partner[ship]'... Anderson's inclusiveness and ardent support of his collaborators' creative development performed a crucial leveling function, partially erasing generational boundaries and also re-focusing the group on their autonomous, continually unfolding expressive aims." George E. Lewis recalled: "Fred let you play as long as you wanted, and you could try out anything."

In February 1977, Anderson and Brimfield visited Europe, where they recorded Accents with the Austrian trio Neighbours (pianist Dieter Glawischnig, bassist Ewald Oberleitner, and drummer Joe Preininger). In May of that year, Anderson opened a venue in Chicago that he named the Birdhouse, named after Charlie Parker. Anderson encountered resistance and harassment from officials and people in the neighborhood, who were suspicious of his motives, and he ended up closing the club a year later. In 1978, Anderson visited Europe again with a quintet, playing at the Moers festival, where he recorded Another Place, his first album as a leader. In 1979, he recorded Dark Day with Brimfield, bassist Steven Palmore, and drummer Hamid Drake, and The Missing Link with bassist Larry Hayrod, Drake, and percussionist Adam Rudolph. (The second album was not released until 1984.)

In 1982, Anderson took over ownership of a bar in Chicago called the Velvet Lounge, and transformed it into a center for the city's jazz and experimental music scenes, hosting Sunday jam sessions and numerous concerts. The club expanded and relocated in the summer of 2006. According to jazz critic John Fordham, "The venue became a spiritual home to many musicians who shared the uncommercial player's perennial need for an intimate space run by, and for, the people who cared." Regarding the environment at the Velvet Lounge, Paul Steinbeck wrote: "Under Anderson's supervision, participating musicians were encouraged to develop performance methodologies that were 'contributive, not competitive'... the musical and social practices that had characterized Anderson's bands since the 1960s were transmitted, in whole or in part, to a broader network of performers and listeners."

Though he remained an active performer, Anderson rarely recorded for about a decade beginning in the early 1980s. (Recordings from this sparse period include Vintage Duets with drummer Steve McCall, recorded in 1980 but not released until 1994, and The Milwaukee Tapes Vol. 1, with Brimfield, Drake, and bassist Larry Hayrod, also recorded in 1980 but not released until 2000.) In 1990, however, he received the first Jazz Masters Fellowship from Arts Midwest, and by the mid-1990s, he resumed a more active recording schedule, both as a solo artist, and in collaboration with younger performers, such as pianist Marilyn Crispell (Destiny), with whom he toured in 1994, and often with familiar colleagues such as Hamid Drake and Bill Brimfield. In 1999, Anderson and Von Freeman appeared as soloists with a 30-piece orchestra in a performance of a work composed and conducted by Edward Wilkerson at the Chicago Jazz Festival. In 2002, the festival honored Anderson, and he appeared as a soloist with the NOW Orchestra, conducted by George E. Lewis, and featuring Bill Brimfield and Roscoe Mitchell. Meanwhile, the Velvet Lounge became internationally known, attracting artists from around the world. In 2005, the Vision Festival presented Fred Anderson Day in his honor, and in 2009, the Velvet Lounge hosted an 80th-birthday celebration featuring four sets of music from some of Chicago's top jazz artists. He continued to record and tour throughout the 2000s, and continued mentoring countless younger musicians, including Harrison Bankhead, Nicole Mitchell, and Dee Alexander, stating "My role in the city is to keep young musicians playing. I will always have a place for them to play." He died on June 24, 2010, at the age of 81, and was survived by two sons, Michael and Eugene (a third son, Kevin, predeceased him), as well as five grandchildren and six great-grandchildren. He was scheduled to perform the day he died.

== Discography ==
=== As leader ===
| Release year | Title | Label | Notes | Recording Date |
|---|---|---|---|---|
| 1978 | Another Place | Moers | Quintet, with Billy Brimfield (trumpet), George E. Lewis (trombone), Brian Smith (bass), Hamid Drake (drums) | 1978 |
| 1979 | Dark Day + Live In Verona | Message | Quartet, with Billy Brimfield (trumpet), Steven Palmore (bass), Hamid Drake (drums) | May 15, 1979 & May 19, 1979 |
| 1984 | The Missing Link | Nessa | Quartet, with Larry Hayrod (bass), Hamid Drake (drums), Adam Rudolph (percussion). | September 17, 1979 |
| 1994 | Vintage Duets | Okka Disk | Duo with Steve McCall (drums). | January 11, 1980 |
| 1995 | Destiny | Okka Disk | Trio, with Marilyn Crispell (piano), Hamid Drake (drums) | April 8, 1994 |
| 1996 | Birdhouse | Okka Disk | Quartet, with Jim Baker (piano), Harrison Bankhead (bass), Hamid Drake (drums) | |
| 1997 | Fred Chicago Chamber Music | Southport | With Tatsu Aoki (bass), Afifi Phillard (drums), Bradley Parker-Sparrow (piano) | |
| 1997 | Fred Anderson / DKV Trio | Okka Disk | With the DKV Trio: Hamid Drake (drums), Kent Kessler (bass), Ken Vandermark (reeds) | |
| 1999 | Live at the Velvet Lounge | Okka Disk | Trio, with Peter Kowald (bass), Hamid Drake (percussion) | |
| 1999 | Fred Anderson Quartet Volume One | Asian Improv | Quartet, with Bill Brimfield (trumpet), Chad Taylor (drums), Tatsu Aoki (bass) | |
| 2000 | The Milwaukee Tapes Vol. 1 | Atavistic | Quartet, with Billy Brimfield (trumpet), Larry Hayrod (bass), Hamid Drake (drums). | January & February 1980 |
| 2000 | 2 Days in April | Eremite | Quartet, with Hamid Drake (drums), Kidd Jordan (tenor sax), William Parker (bass) | |
| 2000 | Fred Anderson Quartet Volume Two | Asian Improv | Quartet, with Hamid Drake (drums), Jeff Parker (guitar), Tatsu Aoki (bass) | |
| 2001 | Duets 2001 | Thrill Jockey | Duo with Robert Barry (drums) | |
| 2001 | On the Run, Live at the Velvet Lounge | Delmark | Trio, with Tatsu Aoki (bass), Hamid Drake (drums) | |
| 2003 | Back at the Velvet Lounge | Delmark | With Maurice Brown (trumpet), Jeff Parker (guitar), Harrison Bankhead, Tatsu Aoki (bass), Chad Taylor (drums) | |
| 2004 | Back Together Again | Thrill Jockey | Duo with Hamid Drake (drums) | |
| 2005 | Blue Winter | Eremite | Trio with William Parker (bass), Hamid Drake (drums) | |
| 2006 | Timeless, Live at the Velvet Lounge | Delmark | Trio with Harrison Bankhead (bass), Hamid Drake (drums) | |
| 2007 | The Great Vision Concert | Ayler | Duo with Harrison Bankhead (bass) | |
| 2007 | From the River to the Ocean | Thrill Jockey | With Hamid Drake (drums), Jeff Parker (guitar), Harrison Bankhead, Josh Abrams (bass) | |
| 2008 | Live at the Velvet Lounge Volume III | Asian Improv | Quartet, with Francis Wong (tenor sax), Chad Taylor (drums), Tatsu Aoki (bass) | |
| 2009 | A Night at the Velvet Lounge Made in Chicago 2007 | Estrada Poznańska | Trio, with Harrison Bankhead (bass), Dushun Mosley (drums) | |
| 2009 | Staying in the Game | Engine | Trio, with Harrison Bankhead (bass), Tim Daisy (drums) | |
| 2009 | 21st Century Chase | Delmark | With Kidd Jordan (tenor sax), Jeff Parker (guitar), Harrison Bankhead (bass), Chad Taylor (drums) | |
| 2009 | Birthday Live 2000 | Asian Improv Records | With Tatsu Aoki (bass), Chad Taylor (drums) | |
| 2010 | Black Horn Long Gone | Southport | Trio, with Malachi Favors (bass), Ajaramu (AJ Shelton) (drums). | January 1993 |
| 2015 | Quintessential Birthday Trio Vol. II | Asian Improv | Trio, with Tatsu Aoki (bass), Chad Taylor (drums). | |
| 2016 | Fred Anderson Quartet Volume IV | Asian Improv | Quartet, with Tim O'Dell (saxophones), Tatsu Aoki (bass), Avreeayl Ra (drums). Recorded in 2010. | |
| 2019 | Fred Anderson Quartet – Live Volume V | FPE | Quartet, with Toshinori Kondo (trumpet, electronics), Tatsu Aoki (bass), Hamid Drake (drums). Recorded in 1994. | |
| 2023 | The Milwaukee Tapes Vol. 2 | Corbett vs. Dempsey | Quartet, with Billie Brimfield (trumpet), Larry Hayrod (bass), Hamid Drake (drums). | January & February 1980 |

=== As sideman ===
With Muhal Richard Abrams

- SoundDance (Pi, 2011)

With The Art Ensemble of Chicago

- Peace Be Unto You (AECO, 2008)

With Joseph Jarman

- Song For (Delmark, 1967)
- As If It Were the Seasons (Delmark, 1968)

With Misha Mengelberg

- Two Days In Chicago (hatOLOGY, 1999)

With Neighbours

- Accents (MRC, 1978)

With Matana Roberts

- The Chicago Project (Central Control, 2008)

With Irene Schweizer and Hamid Drake

- Willisau & Taktlos (Intakt, 2007)

With Ken Vandermark and Territory Band-6

- Collide (Okka Disk, 2007)
