= First Ones =

Studio album by Positive Knowledge
- Released: 2005
- Recorded: April 2005
- Studio: BellBoy Studio, Richmond, California
- Genre: Free jazz
- Length: 1:13:45
- Label: Charles Lester Music; CLM 26-008
- Producer: Ike Levin, Oluyemi Thomas

First Ones is an album by Positive Knowledge, the jazz group founded and led by reed player Oluyemi Thomas and poet Ijeoma Chinue Thomas. It was recorded in April 2005 in Richmond, California, and was released later that year by Charles Lester Music.

== Reception ==
Professional ratings
Review scores
Source	Rating
Tom Hull – on the Web	B+

Tom Hull awarded the album a grade of "B+", and wrote: "This one is a throwback to the intersection of the avant-garde with the black power renaissance of the late '60s -- or rather, an attempt to move forward again... mostly this breaks down to two reeds plus drums -- shades of Sonny Simmons and Prince Lasha. Plus poetry and percussion. This is still at the interesting level for me."

Rex Butters of All About Jazz stated: "Live and on record, Oluyemi and Ijeoma Thomas cover a lot of musical ground with their Positive Knowledge projects. First Ones continues that trend... Exponents of universalism and extended creativity, the artists of Positive Knowledge withhold nothing, playing music drenched in soul brilliance and joy."

In a review for Cadence, Robert Iannapollo commented: "the music they make is one of the more successful mergers of poetry and free jazz. The reason for that is that Ijeoma pays as much attention to being an instrumentalist as well as a poet. She and Oluyemi seem to have worked out an almost telepathic approach to both improvising and accompanying... Positive Knowledge occupies a unique place in the free jazz landscape and First Ones is a worthwhile addition to its growing discography."

Improvijazzation Nation's Dick Metcalf stated: "The most notable thing about the performances on this particular album is the degree of freedom & energy they project. 'Never a dull moment' is an axiom that CERTAINLY applies here. I enjoyed this thoroughly, & if your mind is open enough, you surely will, too. I rate it MOST HIGHLY RECOMMENDED for those who love to hear what creativity in music truly is."

== Track listing ==
1. "Unexplainable Reality/Events at the Edge" – 8:57
2. "Message of the Stones" – 11:18
3. "First Ones" – 3:51
4. "Mystic Dialogues" – 7:49
5. "Sumotuwe (After Betty Carter)" – 8:51
6. "In the Center of the Boom" – 3:04
7. "Expression for Peace" – 4:32
8. "Crisis to Victory" – 12:05
9. "Sea of Joy (For Dr. Elsie Austin)" – 6:29
10. "Prayerful Devotion" – 6:49

== Personnel ==
- Oluyemi Thomas – bass clarinet, C-melody saxophone, soprano saxophone, musette, flute, gong, talking drum, percussion
- Ijeoma Thomas – vocals, poetry, gong, percussion
- Ike Levin – bass clarinet, tenor saxophone, percussion
- Spirit – drums, percussion, talking drum
