= Fred Chicago Chamber Music =

Studio album by Fred Anderson
- Released: 1997
- Recorded: March 23 & May 3, 1996
- Studio: Sparrow Sound Design, Chicago
- Genre: Jazz
- Length: 137:18
- Label: Southport
- Producer: Fred Anderson

Fred Anderson chronology
Birdhouse (1996)	Fred Chicago Chamber Music (1997)	Fred Anderson / DKV Trio (1997)

Fred Chicago Chamber Music is a double album by American jazz saxophonist Fred Anderson recorded in 1996 and released on the Chicago-based Southport label. The first disc matches him in a trio with bassist Tatsu Aoki and drummer Afifi Phillard, while the second is composed of Anderson/Aoki duets with Southport co-owner Bradley Parker-Sparrow joining in on piano for two tracks.

== Reception ==
Professional ratings
Review scores
Source	Rating
AllMusic	4/5 stars
The Penguin Guide to Jazz	3/4 stars

In his review for AllMusic, Scott Yanow states "All of the numbers are group improvisations, but the results are far from random or chaotic. Anderson is not afraid to embrace a melody, or to play quite tonally and use repetition, space and rhythmic ideas."

The Penguin Guide to Jazz notes that "Fred sometimes overplays to cover for the absence of a chordal instrument, he doesn't always seem entirely secure with his drummer, a relative unknown, and tries to pack the metre."

The JazzTimes review by Willard Jenkins states "Befitting Anderson's spontaneous expressions, the pieces here are credited to the collective whole. As for the state of the tenor, Fred Anderson is an original who is not to be missed.."

== Track listing ==
Disc One

All compositions by Anderson / Aoki / Philliard

1. "Fred's Blues" - 11:53
2. "Grasshopper Greens" - 6:24
3. "Indiana" - 16:51
4. "Grizzle" - 20:44
5. "Afro-Asia" - 14:37

Disc Two

All compositions by Anderson / Aoki / Sparrow

1. "Twice as Good" - 6:41
2. "Reward" - 9:26
3. "Instantaneous Hot Water Heater" - 7:17
4. "Sand" - 6:15
5. "Bi-Pack" - 6:13
6. "Rusty Swing" - 6:12
7. "Ring: Duet Version" - 7:05
8. "North Avenue" - 8:22
9. "Steady Things Are..." - 6:21
10. "Ice Bucket" - 2:41

== Personnel ==
- Fred Anderson - tenor sax
- Tatsu Aoki - bass
- Afifi Phillard - drums, percussion on disc one
- Bradley Parker-Sparrow - piano on disc two #8, #10
