= Tatsu Aoki =

Tatsu Aoki 青木 達幸
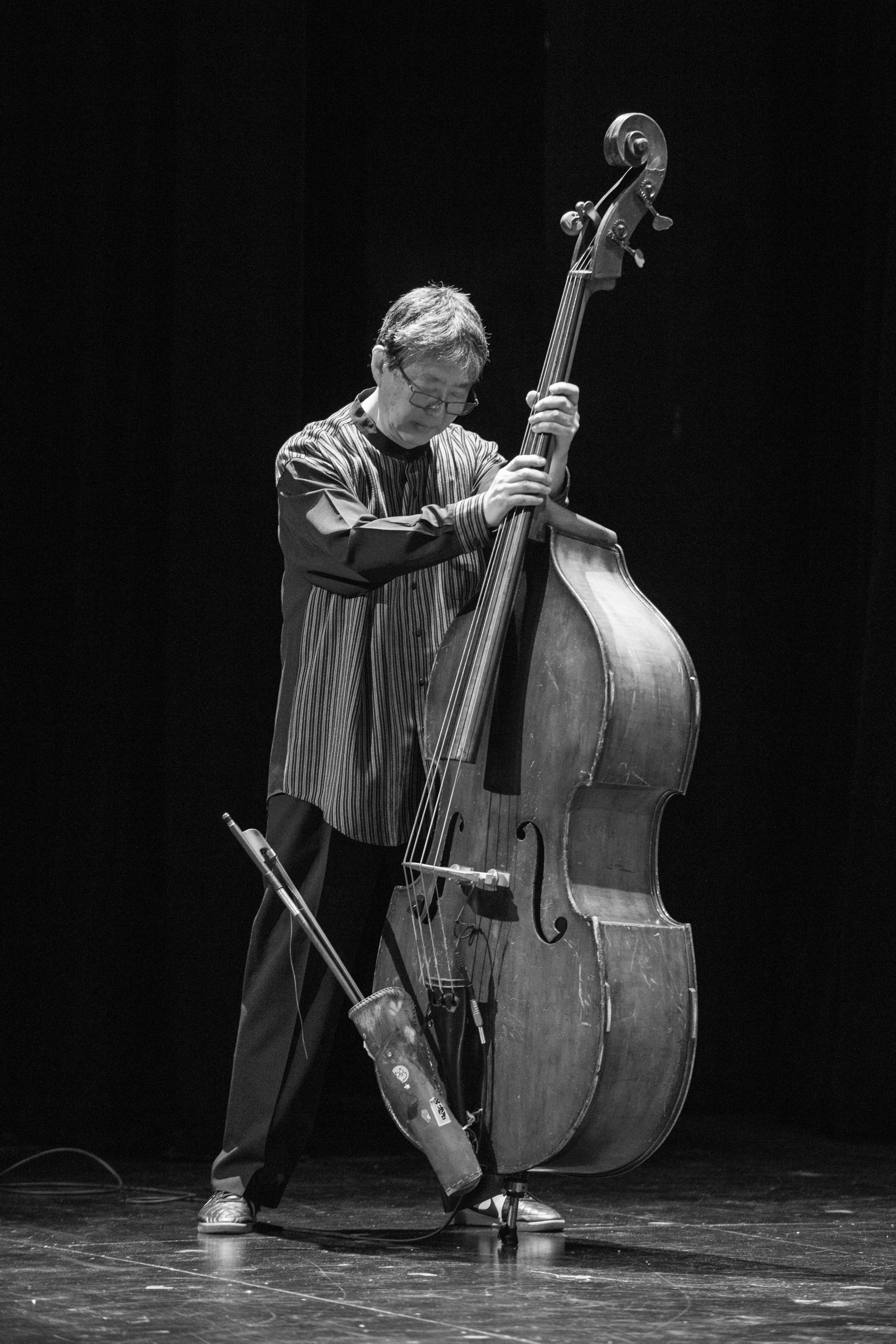

Background information
- Born: Aoki Tatsuyuki; September 19, 1957 (age 68); Tokyo, Japan
- Genres: Jazz / Experimental / World Music
- Occupations: Musician, filmmaker
- Instrument: Double bass
- Years active: 1970–present
- Label: Asian Improv
- Member of: MIYUMI Project
- Website: tatsuaoki.com

Tatsu Aoki (青木 達幸, Aoki Tatsuyuki) (born September 19, 1957) is a multi-instrumentalist trained in traditional Japanese music (i.e.: taiko and shamisen), educator and experimental filmmaker. In his career as Chicago's Jazz and creative improvisor, he is mostly known as a long-standing bassist for Fred Anderson and he has also worked with George Freeman, and Von Freeman in the 90s. Aoki also has curious recording projects with Malachi Favors, Roscoe Mitchell, Don Moye, Wu Man, and other internationally renowned artists. Aoki also directs cultural events that promote the history of Japanese artistic traditions and contemporary Asian influences in jazz. As the founder and artistic director of Asian Improv Arts Midwest, he hosts events such as the annual Chicago Asian American Jazz Festival and the Japanese American Service Committee's Tsukasa Taiko Legacy arts residency program.

== Biography ==
Tatsu Aoki is an advocate for the Asian American community as well as a filmmaker, educator, composer and a performer of traditional and experimental music forms. He was born in Tokyo in 1957 to Toyoakimoto, an artisan family proficient in okiya, the tradition of working as booking and training agents for geisha in downtown Tokyo. Starting at the age of four, Aoki was part of his family's performance crew and received traditional Tokyo geisha cultural training and studies which combined history with creativity. In the late 1960s, during Tokyo's economic and social decline, many traditional family businesses were forced to close. With his grandmother's passing, he shifted his training to American pop and experimental music. In the early 1970s, he became a member of Gintenkai, an experimental ensemble that combined traditional music with Western forms. He began to work in small-gauge and experimental films, influenced by his biological father, who was a movie producer at Shintoho studio.

In 1977, Aoki left Tokyo to study experimental filmmaking at the School of the Art Institute of Chicago, where he has taught film production and art history. He has produced more than thirty experimental films and performs on double bass, shamisen, and taiko. He was a visiting professor at Northwestern University, teaching courses in Asian American Arts Practices and Identity. He is the founder and artistic director of the Chicago Asian American Jazz Festival. In 1999 he became president of Asian Improv Records in San Francisco. He has managed or produced more than fifty albums for the label, including the Max Roach and Jon Jang collaboration The Beijing Trio.

Since 1995, Aoki has led the Miyumi Project ensemble. The Miyumi Project has had a varying number of musicians; the only continuous members have been Aioki and Mwata Bowden. With drummer Afifi Phillard they originally called the group Power Trio. In 2016, the Miyumi Project ensemble was the official musical presenter for Yoko Ono's Skylanding installation at Jackson Park in Chicago. Ono produced the band's album Skylanding. In 2017, the Miyumi Project contributed to And Then They Came for Us, a documentary about internment of Japanese Americans and released an album of the same name. For twenty years he has played bass for saxophonist Fred Anderson. He has also worked with Hamid Drake, Von Freeman, Nicole Mitchell, and Jeff Parker and has had extensive recording processes with Roscoe Mitchell, Don Moye, Wu Man, Joseph Jarman, and Malachi Favors.

Aoki's suite Rooted: Origins of Now, a four-movement suite for big band, premiered in 2001 at Ping Tom Memorial Park and was performed at the Chicago Jazz Festival and MCA Stage as part of the Chicago Asian American Jazz Festival. Additional albums include Basser Live (1999) and Basser Live II (2005), recorded live at MCA Stage; Symphony of Two Cities (2002); and Posture of Reality with Wu Man (2003). In 2016 he toured as part of Nicole Mitchell's Black Earth Ensemble. He leads Tsukasa Taiko, a traditional Japanese drumming group, and has performed with Toyoaki Shamisen Ensemble and Shubukai Classical Dance

As executive director of Asian Improved arts Midwest, an Asian American cultural arts presenter organization, Aoki has initiated and managed several programs to advance the understanding of traditional arts, including the annual Chicago Asian American Jazz Festival, the Tsukasa Taiko Legacy, and the Toyoaki Shamisen arts residency projects.

He began making films in regular 8 gauge in early childhood. His biological father, Wahei Hoshino, was a movie producer in the 1960s and influenced his work in small gauge, experimental filmmaking. His super 8 diary films and experimental films with optical printing have been screened around the world. He presented the documentary That Asian Thing in 2008 and worked as a composer for the short film Farewell, Mr. Griswell in 2010. He has published sample versions of films such as FLUX Project, Gate, Puzzle - Part III, Ah Sou Desuka: Is that So!, and Solution A.

== Awards and honors ==
- 2001 Chicagoan of the Year, Chicago Tribune
- 2007 Milestone Award, Asian American Institute
- 2010 Cultural Achievement Award, Japan America Society of Chicago
- 2014 Living in Our Culture Award, Japanese American Service Committee
- 2015 Jazz Heroes Award, Jazz Journalists Association
- 2017 Best Experimental Film, Light, Canada International Film Festival
- 2017 Commendation for the Promotion of Japanese Culture, Ministry of Foreign Affairs in Japan
- 2017 Community Service Award, Asian American Advisory Council of Illinois, Illinois Secretary of State Jesse White
- 2018 George Award, George Freeman
- 2018 Silver Gavel Award, American Bar Association
- 2019 Community Service award, Asian American Coalition of Chicago
- 2020 United States Artist Fellowship and Illinois Arts Council Fellowship

== Selected discography ==
- Depressingly Happy (Innocent Eyes & Lenses, 1990)
- Needless to Say (Sound Aspects, 1992)
- Kioto (Asian Improv, 1994)
- If It Wasn't for Paul (Southport, 1995)
- Urban Reception (Southport, 1996)
- Actual Music (TOE, 1996)
- Live at Blue Rider Theatre (Innocent Eyes & Lenses, 1997)
- Basser Live (Asian Improv, 1999)
- 2 x 4 (Southport, 1999) with Malachi Favors Maghostut
- Trio (Melungeon 2006)
- Boxes (Asian Improv, 2019)

=== As sideman ===
With Fred Anderson

- Fred Chicago Chamber Music (Southport, 1997)
- Fred Anderson Quartet Volume One (Asian Improv, 1999)
- Fred Anderson Quartet Volume Two (Asian Improv, 2000)
- On the Run, Live at the Velvet Lounge (Delmark, 2001)
- Back at the Velvet Lounge (Delmark, 2003)
- Live at the Velvet Lounge Volume III (Asian Improv, 2008)
- Birthday Live 2000 (Asian Improv, 2009)
- Quintessential Birthday Trio Vol. II (Asian Improv, 2015)
- Fred Anderson Quartet Live Vol. IV (Asian Improv, 2016)
- Tsukasa Taiko: Gintenkai (Asian Improv, 2017)
- Fred Anderson Legacy Band (Asian Improv, 2018)
- Live Vol. V (FPE, 2019)

With the Miyumi Project

- The Miyumi Project (Southport, 2000)
- Rooted: Origins of Now (Southport, 2002)
- Re:Rooted (Southport, 2006)
- MIYUMI Project: RAW and ALIVE (Asian Improv, 2016)
- And Then They Came for Us/Un-American (Asian Improv, 2017)
- Reduction Ensemble - MIYUMI Project (Asian Improv, 2018)
- MIYUMI Project: "RAW and ALIVE II" (Asian Improv, 2018)
- Best of the MIYUMI Project (FPE, 2020)

With others

- Jeff Chan, Jeff Chan's Horns of Plenty (Asian Improv, 2009)
- Von Freeman, Fire with Von Freeman (Southport, 1996)
- Jason Kao Hwang, Graphic Evidence (Asian Improv, 2006)
- Kenny Millions, Midnight in Chicago (Hum Ha, 2002)
- Kenny Millions, Kenny Meets Tatsu (Hum Ha, 2002)
- Nicole Mitchell, Mandorla Awakening II: Emerging Worlds (FPE, 2017)
- Roscoe Mitchell, First Look, Chicago Duos (Southport, 2005)
- Don Moye, A Symphony of Cities (Southport, 2002)
- Francis Wong, Chicago Time Code (Asian Improv, 1995)
- Francis Wong, Early Abstractions (Estrada Poznanska, 2009)
- Francis Wong, Wojtck Trio (Asian Improv, 2013)
- Francis Wong, Miyoshi Sketches (Asian Improv, 2017)
- Edward Wilkerson, that's what it WAZ (Asian Improv, 2017)
- Rami Atassi, atashi wa rami (Asian Improv, 2020)
