= Duets 2001 =

Live album by Fred Anderson
- Released: 2001
- Recorded: May 22, 1999
- Venue: Empty Bottle, Chicago
- Genre: Jazz
- Length: 53:08
- Label: Thrill Jockey

Fred Anderson chronology
Fred Anderson Quartet Volume Two (2000)	Duets 2001 (2001)	On the Run, Live at the Velvet Lounge (2001)

Duets 2001 is an album by American jazz saxophonist Fred Anderson with former Sun Ra drummer Robert Barry, which, despite the title, was recorded live in 1999 at Chicago's Empty Bottle after having performed together only once before. It was released on the Thrill Jockey label.

== Reception ==
Professional ratings
Review scores
Source	Rating
AllMusic	4/5 stars
The Penguin Guide to Jazz	3.5/4 stars

In his review for AllMusic, Glenn Astarita states, "Duets 2001 is a rousing success, as the duo embarks upon a series of mid-tempo swing vamps atop free bop-style dialogue and brisk interplay, thanks to Anderson's corpulent tone, limberly executed lines, and Barry's polyrhythmic swing beats."

The Penguin Guide to Jazz says, "Barry is a powerful drummer, well used to marshalling the most chaotic and anarchic of ensembles, but here he can be quite delicate, and only a recording of this quality would have captured all of his quieter figures."

The All About Jazz review by Mark Corroto notes that, "While this session is billed as an improvising occasion, the duo is anything but loose and no musical idea finds a dead end. It seems that for every action one player takes, there is the positive reaction by the other."

In an article for the Chicago Reader, Neil Tesser claims, "I've been listening to tenor saxophonist Fred Anderson for about 30 years, and I can't recall a more joyful, liberated, lyrical example of his playing than his latest disc, Duets 2001".

== Track listing ==
1. "Bouncing" - 13:05
2. "Speed Way" - 8:17
3. "Taps" - 8:46
4. "Off Blue" - 8:41
5. "We" - 6:20
6. "Dark Day" - 7:59

== Personnel ==
- Fred Anderson - tenor sax
- Robert Barry - drums
- Jim Newberry - photography
