= Vintage Duets =

Studio album by Fred Anderson
- Released: 1994
- Recorded: January 11, 1980
- Studio: Soto, Chicago
- Genre: Jazz
- Length: 44:28
- Label: Okka Disk
- Producer: Fred Anderson

Fred Anderson chronology
The Missing Link (1984)	Vintage Duets (1994)	Destiny (1995)

Vintage Duets is an album by American jazz saxophonist Fred Anderson with drummer Steve McCall.

== Background ==
Before joining Henry Threadgill's Air trio, McCall worked with Anderson at various points from early in his career, playing together in 1966 on Joseph Jarman's Song For, a seminal document of the AACM. Vintage Duets was recorded in 1980 at the request of the tiny Austrian Message label, but the company went out of business before the album was released and finally the tapes were the primary instigation that started Bruno Johnson's Okka Disk label in 1994. The album was Anderson's first recording released in a decade.

== Reception ==
Professional ratings
Review scores
Source	Rating
AllMusic	4/5 stars
The Penguin Guide to Jazz	3/4 stars

In her review for AllMusic, Joslyn Layne states "is not only energetic and masterful, but somehow so full, warm, and grounded that (to free-jazz ears) it is also soothing."

Howard Reich, writing for the Chicago Tribune, called the album "revelatory," and wrote: "the lucid structure, logical development, impeccable phrasing, accomplished technique and melodic sensitivity of his solos... run counter to almost everything 'free jazz' has come to mean today."

The authors of the Penguin Guide to Jazz Recordings stated that the duets "are as laid back and unhurried as could ever be, sometimes to the point where the listener feels excluded."

== Track listing ==
1. "Within" - 21:17
2. "Wandering" - 23:11

== Personnel ==
- Fred Anderson - tenor sax
- Steve McCall - percussion
