= Nigeria (Oluyemi Thomas album) =

Studio album by Oluyemi Thomas
- Released: 2006
- Recorded: September 8, 2001
- Studio: Solid Studio, Ann Arbor, Michigan
- Genre: Free jazz
- Label: Not Two Records
- Producer: Kenn Thomas, Oluyemi Thomas

Nigeria is an album by reed player Oluyemi Thomas. It was recorded in September 2001 at Solid Studio in Ann Arbor, Michigan, and was released in 2006 by Not Two Records.

== Reception ==
Professional ratings
Review scores
Source	Rating
AllMusic	4/5 stars
The Free Jazz Collective	3.5/5 stars
Tom Hull – on the Web	B+

In a review for AllMusic, Michael G. Nastos wrote: "Thomas has chosen a free-flowing music based on the precepts of Chicago's Association for the Advancement of Creative Musicians and the echoes of Africa... For those who need a change of pace, this fine recording... is well worth seeking out and deeply listening to."

Dan Warburton, writing for Paris Transatlantic, stated: "there's something about this... outing that keeps me coming back for more... it makes a welcome change to come across a free jazz album that manages to steer clear both of post hardbop stylings and all out neural meltdown... an intriguing album."

A reviewer for The Free Jazz Collective commented: "this record is unusual, if only because it's rare to find free jazz albums with both synthesizer and fretless bass... The album is a kind of suite, without pauses between the tracks, reinforcing the very strong musical unity, and an incredible raw poetic power. From the very beginning the four musicians are into the music, led by drums and piano, with the screeching, howling cries of the bass clarinet soaring through the space, evolving into a very intense and more uptempo moment, just to calm down again and to soften on the tones of the synthesizer... Raw poetic power, I can't find any other words for it."

== Track listing ==
1. "Nigeria (After Orie & Benjamin)" – 15:01
2. "Conversation with Yourself" – 4:23
3. "Recreated by Fire" – 11:43
4. "Homeward Bound" – 1:23
5. "Byrd Song" – 2:50
6. "Life Long Journey" – 2:54
7. "Prayer" – 2:53
8. "Silently Speaking" – 3:49
9. "The Other Side of Self" – 11:35

== Personnel ==
- Oluyemi Thomas – bass clarinet, musette, percussion, voice
- Kenn Thomas – piano, electric piano
- Eugene Wilson IV – electric bass
- Howard Byrdsong – drums
