= Back Together Again =

Studio album by Fred Anderson & Hamid Drake
- Released: March 23, 2004
- Recorded: December 2003
- Studio: Soma Studios, Chicago
- Genre: Jazz
- Length: 72:43
- Label: Thrill Jockey

Fred Anderson chronology
Back at the Velvet Lounge (2003)	Back Together Again (2004)	Blue Winter (2005)

Back Together Again is an album by American jazz saxophonist Fred Anderson with drummer Hamid Drake, which was recorded in 2003 and released on the Thrill Jockey label. They played together for more than 30 years, but this was their first duo recording. A bonus CD-ROM includes footage of three of the tunes along with interviews in which Anderson and Drake dissect the process of how the songs evolve and the different styles and approaches the two use.

== Reception ==
Professional ratings
Review scores
Source	Rating
AllMusic	4.5/5 stars
The Penguin Guide to Jazz Recordings	3/4 stars
The Village Voice	A−

Reviewing for The Village Voice in September 2004, Tom Hull said, "It feels like [Anderson]'s finally found his way. Master drummer Drake, who learned to play alongside Anderson's son when his family moved to Chicago, keeps the rhythms bubbling, getting a robust but subdued sound from his frame drums that keeps Anderson relaxed and generous."

In his review for AllMusic, Sean Westergaard states "Anderson can spin endlessly creative melodic improvisations on tenor, and Hamid Drake is every bit his equal on the traps and frame drums. It should be no surprise that this set is amazing. Both men are at the top of their game."

The All About Jazz review by Rex Butters says "Hamid Drake and Fred Anderson bring the fruits of their long association to bear and share that magic chemistry as a stunning document of just how much music two people can make."

The JazzTimes review by Mike Shanley notes that "The eight tracks are likely spontaneous improvisations, but each has a structural focus in rhythm and melody. Neither musician pushes at the other too aggressively, preferring instead to move in tandem."

In another review for JazzTimes, Chris Kelsey claims "This is a very solid, occasionally superlative session-proof positive that the best jazz coming from Chicago still has its roots in the AACM."

The PopMatters review by Patrick Sisson states "Back Together Again finally documents an amazing working relationship between two friends and musicians. With such stellar results, it’s almost more unbelievable that nobody has ever had these two record as a duet before."

== Track listing ==
1. "Leap Forward" - 7:39
2. "Black Women" - 7:23
3. "Back Together Again" - 13:49
4. "Losel Drolma" - 5:49
5. "A Ray from THE ONE" - 9:03
6. "Louisiana Strut" - 9:30
7. "Know Your Advantage (The Great Tradition)" - 6:42
8. "Lama Khgenno (Heart's Beloved)" - 12:48

== Personnel ==
- Fred Anderson - tenor sax
- Hamid Drake - drums
