= Live at the Velvet Lounge =

Live album by Fred Anderson
- Released: 1999
- Recorded: June 1, 1998
- Venue: Velvet Lounge, Chicago
- Genre: Jazz
- Length: 73:52
- Label: Okka Disk
- Producer: Fred Anderson, Peter Kowald

Fred Anderson chronology
| Fred Anderson / DKV Trio (1997) | Live at the Velvet Lounge (1999) | Fred Anderson Quartet Volume One (1999) |

Live at the Velvet Lounge is an album by American jazz saxophonist Fred Anderson with German free jazz bassist Peter Kowald and long-time collaborator drummer Hamid Drake. The record documents a June 1998 performance at the Chicago club owned by Anderson, the Velvet Lounge, and was released on the Okka Disk label.

== Reception ==
Professional ratings
Review scores
| Source | Rating |
|---|---|
| AllMusic | 4.5/5 stars |
| The Penguin Guide to Jazz | 3.5/4 stars |

In her review for AllMusic, Joslyn Layne states "Before you know it, the trio is in the midst of a lively musical display that melds Anderson's all-out blowing, Kowald's extended techniques, and Drake's skill in hand percussion." The Penguin Guide to Jazz states "The live session comes from Anderson's own club and it has the self-indulgent relaxation of focus that comes with a home gig."

== Track listing ==
All compositions by Fred Anderson, Peter Kowald, Hamid Drake

1. "Straight, but not Straight" - 33:17
2. "To Those Who Know" - 11:41
3. "Multidimensional Reality" - 28:54

== Personnel ==
- Fred Anderson - tenor sax
- Peter Kowald - bass
- Hamid Drake - percussion
