= Transmissions (Alan Silva and Oluyemi Thomas album) =

Live album by Alan Silva and Oluyemi Thomas
- Released: 1999
- Recorded: October 16, 1999
- Venue: Fire in the Valley festival, Unitarian Meetinghouse, Amherst, Massachusetts
- Genre: Free jazz
- Label: Eremite Records; MTE027
- Producer: Michael Ehlers

Alan Silva chronology
A Hero's Welcome: Pieces for Rare Occasions (1999)	Transmissions (1999)	Alan Silva & the Sound Visions Orchestra (2001)

Transmissions is a live album by bassist Alan Silva and multi-instrumentalist Oluyemi Thomas. It was recorded in October 1999 at the Fire in the Valley festival at the Unitarian Meetinghouse in Amherst, Massachusetts, and was released later that year by Eremite Records

== Reception ==
Professional ratings
Review scores
Source	Rating
AllMusic	4/5 stars
The Penguin Guide to Jazz	3/4 stars

In a review for AllMusic, Steve Loewy wrote: "These five conversations... are exercises in how to maintain a continuous flow of ideas for nearly an hour of live performance. Thomas' primitive style has roots way in the past, but his radical approach and non-swinging style and partial rejection of traditional swing marks his lines as something beyond the ordinary. Silva caresses his strings, sliding, stretching, even whining, and, like Thomas, embraces unconventional ways of playing. Together, these two unsung adventurers wander in the wilderness and discover, if not oil, then at least some new perspectives on the musical experience."

The authors of the Penguin Guide to Jazz Recordings noted that some of the pieces are "simple, almost sweetly beatific," while most of the interest "centres around Silva's often brilliant work."

Bill Shoemaker, writing for Jazz Times, stated: "Transmissions... is a welcomed opportunity to hear Silva reassert his compelling voice on the instrument... Silva is a keen listener, as is Thomas, who repeatedly ratchets the tension or shifts the color at the right moment to charge the dialogue. Transmissions is an absorbing album, and a clear signal of Silva’s ongoing vitality."

In an article for All About Jazz, Derek Taylor commented: "Never to my knowledge have bass clarinet and bass been wedded so consummately in isolation. The title to the disc is an apt one and captures the feeling of this team of tone scientists beaming out sonic signals that transcend the conventional continuums of space and time." Another AAJ reviewer remarked: "There is plenty of material on Transmissions to engage even the most stolid listener. Repeated listenings offer new rounds of discovery... This is wide open territory: Silva and Thomas charge into it like there's no tomorrow."

One Final Note's Scott Hreha stated: "Rare as it may be, some records are instant classics. Take this meeting between Alan Silva and... Oluyemi Thomas—an artifact so beautifully recorded, so spiritually executed, so evocative of deep fountains of knowledge that it seizes the attention from practically the first seconds of play. From there, Silva and Thomas meld their collective experience into 50 minutes of pure intuition, resulting in an unfathomable tone world of bass, reeds and peripherals guaranteed to open the doors to cultural perception."

== Track listing ==
All compositions by Alan Silva and Oluyemi Thomas.

1. "Connecting with the Divine" – 16:20
2. "Lofty Flight" – 12:30
3. "Root & Branch" – 11:49
4. "Offering to the Exalted One" – 5:25
5. "Soft Flowing Waters" – 4:35

== Personnel ==
- Alan Silva – double bass
- Oluyemi Thomas – bass clarinet, C melody saxophone, wooden flute, percussion
