= A Night at the Velvet Lounge Made in Chicago 2007 =

Live album by Fred Anderson
- Released: 2009
- Recorded: November 17, 2007
- Venue: Pietrze Theatre, Poznań
- Genre: Jazz
- Length: 77:11
- Label: Estrada Poznańska

Fred Anderson chronology
Live at the Velvet Lounge Volume III (2008)	A Night at the Velvet Lounge Made in Chicago 2007 (2009)	Staying in the Game (2009)

A Night at the Velvet Lounge Made in Chicago 2007 is an album by American jazz saxophonist Fred Anderson which, despite its title, was recorded live in Poznań, Poland, at the second Made in Chicago Festival, and released by Estrada Poznańska, a small Polish cultural arts agency. Anderson is accompanied by bassist Harrison Bankhead and 8 Bold Souls drummer Dushun Mosley.

== Reception ==
Professional ratings
Review scores
Source	Rating
The Free Jazz Collective	4/5 stars

In an article for the Chicago Reader Bill Meyer notes that "Mosley's shifts between relaxed swing and edgy funk keep his partners on their toes, and the CD's high point comes when his lively calypso beat on 'Gin and Bourbon Street' prompts Anderson to channel his inner Sonny Rollins." A reviewer for The Free Jazz Collective wrote: "here is another excellent Fred Anderson album... You can not but admire the man. His love of music is truly contagious. Impossible to listen to this without enjoying it too!"

== Track listing ==
All compositions by Anderson / Bankhead / Mosley

1. "Juke Box Jazz" - 16:09
2. "Clearing the Air / Me We" - 10:42
3. "Gin and Bourbon Street" - 9:07
4. "Africa" - 10:27
5. "Trying to Cath the Rabbit" - 12:51
6. "Funky Fred" - 8:34
7. "The Strut" - 9:21

== Personnel ==
- Fred Anderson – tenor sax
- Harrison Bankhead – bass
- Dushun Mosley – drums
