= Dark Day (Fred Anderson album) =

Live album by Fred Anderson
- Released: 1979
- Recorded: May 15, 1979
- Venue: Museum of Contemporary Art, Chicago
- Genre: Jazz
- Length: 59:14
- Label: Message
- Producer: Robert Kai Jon Kasseckert

Fred Anderson chronology
| Another Place (1978) | Dark Day (1979) | The Missing Link (1984) |

Dark Day is an album by American jazz saxophonist Fred Anderson recorded live in 1979 at the Museum of Contemporary Art, Chicago and released in a small batch on the tiny Austrian Message label. The performance was part of a series of AACM concerts presented by the museum. Anderson's Quartet features long-time partner trumpeter Billy Brimfield, bassist Steven Palmore and young drummer Hamid Drake, who contributes the piece "The Prayer", later retitled "Bombay (Children of Cambodia)".

The album was reissued on CD by Atavistic in 2001 as part of their Unheard Music Series with a bonus CD including an unreleased master recorded at Verona Jazz 1979, only four days after the Chicago concert.

== Reception ==
Professional ratings
Review scores
| Source | Rating |
|---|---|
| AllMusic | 4.5/5 stars |
| The Penguin Guide to Jazz | 3/4 stars |

In his review for AllMusic, Thom Jurek states about the Atavistic reissue "these two dates on a pair of very reasonably prices CDs, with great sound, are gifts rescued from the islands of obscurity, and should be listened to with the awe and wonder they inspire." The Penguin Guide to Jazz says that "Dark Day is the definitive Anderson performance, sombre and cutting by turns, packed with muscular phrases but also strangely tender and vulnerable."

== Track listing ==
All compositions by Fred Anderson except as indicated

1. "Dark Day" - 18:40
2. "Saxoon" - 11:32
3. "Three On Two" - 18:07
4. "The Prayer" (Hamid Drake) - 10:55

Atavistic reissue CD 2 Live in Verona

Recorded live May 19, 1979 at Palazzo Della Gran Guardia, Verona, Italy.

1. "The Bull" - 16:32
2. "Three On Two" - 31:46
3. "Dark Day" - 25:12

== Personnel ==
- Fred Anderson - tenor sax
- Billy Brimfield - trumpet
- Steven Palmore - bass
- Hamid Drake - drums, tablas
