= H.Con.Res.57/Treasure Box =

Live album by Alan Silva
- Released: 2003
- Recorded: May 24 and 27, 2001
- Venue: Uncool Festival, Poschiavo, Switzerland
- Genre: Free jazz
- Label: Eremite Records; MTE039/040/041/042
- Producer: Alan Silva, Michael Ehlers

Alan Silva chronology
Emancipation Suite (2002)	H.Con.Res.57/Treasure Box (2003)	Crimson Lip (2011)

H.Con.Res.57/Treasure Box (also referred to as HR57 I–IV or HR57 Treasure Box) is a live, 4-CD album by multi-instrumentalist Alan Silva. It was recorded on May 24 and 27, 2001, at the Uncool Festival in Poschiavo, Switzerland, and was released in 2003 in limited quantities by Eremite Records. On the album, Silva is joined by a large ensemble known as the Celestrial Communication Orchestra. The performances marked the first occasion on which Silva's choice of musicians was completely unrestricted in terms of budget or geography.

The title refers to a 1987 United States House of Representatives resolution sponsored by Congressman John Conyers Jr of Michigan "respecting the designation of jazz as a rare and valuable national American treasure." The text of the resolution was recited at both concerts by Ijeoma Thomas.

The four CDs are housed in boxes that were assembled and embellished by hand, and that also contain reproductions of art work and booklets featuring photos and essays.

== Reception ==
Professional ratings
Review scores
Source	Rating
AllMusic	4/5 stars
The Penguin Guide to Jazz	4/4 stars

In a review for AllMusic, Thom Jurek called the album "an exemplary document of Alan Silva's consummate skill as a composer, big band leader, arranger, and improviser." He singled out the May 24 performance of "Amplitude" for praise, acknowledging its "nearly frightening power and beauty," and writing: "aural divisions and arbitrary categories implode and then dissolve. Jazz and classical, musically tempered, and free improvisation become part of something much larger, something sublimely connected to a force outside itself, and perhaps even outside the realm of music." He concluded: "This set... is worth its weight in gold and should be referred to continually in the jazz canon for its revelatory control and exploration."

The authors of the Penguin Guide to Jazz Recordings awarded the album 4 stars, but cautioned that they found the music "aurally 'difficult,' sometimes frustrating." They wrote: "Describing the music is almost impossible. So large are the sections of HR57 in its various incarnations that any generalization is impossible, but the sound has a strong, almost primitive quality which perhaps recalls Silva's association with Albert Ayler in his later days... Silva isn't so very far from the great bandleaders of a later generation. If one can imagine the Albert Ayler group guesting with the Stan Kenton band, that isn't very far from reality... As an assertion of jazz's authority and position in American culture, these four hours of music are unequalled."

Grego Edwards, writing for All About Jazz, commented: "This is in all a vibrant, exalting, exuberant, flaming conflagration of voices, a gathering of the free tribe, a melding of the many ultra-individual voices into a massively powerful whole. The compositional-conductional element brings cohesion and structure points into what otherwise could have been chaos. And the elements do so in ways that are pure Alan Silva. Brilliant... If you are a serious student of the avant arts, you owe it to yourself to study (and enjoy) what Alan and the master musicians are up to here. It's a monumental achievement."

== Track listing ==
Composed by Alan Silva.

=== Disc 1 ===
1. "Amplitude I" – 4:50
2. "Amplitude II" – 21:30
3. "Amplitude III" – 20:14
4. "Amplitude IV" – 15:41

=== Disc 2 ===
1. "HR57 I" – 23:48
2. "HR57 II" – 15:50
3. "What Is Your Name?" – 9:35

=== Disc 3 ===
1. "Amplitude I" – 15:43
2. "Amplitude II" – 10:46
3. "HR57 I" – 15:41
4. "HR57 II" – 18:56

=== Disc 4 ===
1. "HR57 III" – 31:14
2. "Soon" – 26:30
3. "What Is Your Name?" – 8:10
- Recorded at the Uncool Festival in Poschiavo, Switzerland. Discs 1 and 2 recorded on May 24, 2001. Discs 3 and 4 recorded on May 27, 2001.

== Personnel ==
- Alan Silva – synthesizer, conductor
- Marshall Allen – alto saxophone, flute
- Kidd Jordan – tenor saxophone
- Daniel Carter – tenor saxophone, alto saxophone, B♭ clarinet, flute, trumpet
- Sabir Mateen – tenor saxophone, alto saxophone, clarinet, flute
- Francis Wong – tenor saxophone, flute
- J. D. Parran – baritone saxophone, clarinet, flute
- Oluyemi Thomas – bass clarinet, C melody saxophone, flute
- Karen Borca – bassoon
- Baikida Carroll – trumpet, flugelhorn
- Roy Campbell Jr. – trumpet, flugelhorn
- Itaru Oki – trumpet
- Johannes Bauer – trombone
- Joseph Bowie – trombone
- Steve Swell – trombone
- William Lowe – bass trombone, tuba
- Joe Daley – tuba, tenor horn
- Bobby Few – piano
- Wilber Morris – bass
- William Parker – bass
- Jackson Krall – drums
- Warren Smith – drums
- Ijeoma Thomas – vocals
