= Staying in the Game =

Studio album by Fred Anderson
- Released: 2009
- Recorded: November 9, 2008
- Studio: Fullerton Recording, Chicago
- Genre: Jazz
- Length: 66:40
- Label: Engine

Fred Anderson chronology
A Night at the Velvet Lounge Made in Chicago 2007 (2009)	Staying in the Game (2009)	21st Century Chase (2009)

Staying in the Game is an album by American jazz saxophonist Fred Anderson, which was recorded in 2008 and released on Engine Studios, a small independent label operated by Steven Walcott. Anderson leads a trio with the rhythm section of bassist Harrison Bankhead and drummer Tim Daisy.

== Reception ==
Professional ratings
Review scores
Source	Rating
AllMusic	4.5/5 stars

In his review for AllMusic, Michael G. Nastos states "The fluid nature of Anderson's elongated solos and inexhaustible ideas fare well alongside those of Rollins, and at his advanced age are as fresh as any in the business."

The All About Jazz review by Henry Smith notes that the album "It's a fitting entrance for an artist who, at over 80 years of age, continues to broaden his approach and push himself forward with unrelenting passion."

== Track listing ==
1. "Sunday Afternoon" - 24:32
2. "The Elephant and the Bee" - 8:14
3. "60 Degrees in November" - 10:48
4. "Wandering" - 6:33
5. "Springing Winter" - 6:11
6. "Changes and Bodies and Tones" - 10:22

== Personnel ==
- Fred Anderson - tenor sax
- Harrison Bankhead - bass
- Tim Daisy - drums
