= Live in New York City =

Live in New York City may refer to:

- Across a Wire: Live in New York City, 1998 album by Counting Crows
- Barney Live in New York City, video of a Barney & Friends 1994 stage show
- Bruce Springsteen & The E Street Band: Live in New York City, 1999–2000 Reunion Tour film by HBO
- Evil or Divine – Live in New York City, video album recorded in 2002 by Dio
- Live in New York City (Dave Matthews Band album), recorded and released in 2010
- Live in New York City (John Lennon album), recorded 1972, released posthumously in 1986
- Live in New York City (Natasha Bedingfield video), recorded and released in 2006
- Live in New York City 12-31-05, 2006 EP by Trey Anastasio
- Mind Body & Soul Sessions: Live in New York City, 2004 DVD video album by Joss Stone
- Live in New York City, 2012 live video and album by Paul Simon

== See also ==
- Live in NYC (disambiguation)
- Live in New York (disambiguation)
- Live from New York City, 1967, by Simon and Garfunkel
