= The Milwaukee Tapes Vol. 1 =

Live album by Fred Anderson
- Released: 2000
- Recorded: January or February, 1980; Milwaukee
- Genre: Jazz
- Length: 70:16
- Label: Atavistic
- Producer: John Corbett

Fred Anderson chronology
Fred Anderson Quartet Volume One (1999)	The Milwaukee Tapes Vol. 1 (2000)	2 Days in April (2000)

The Milwaukee Tapes Vol. 1 is an album by American jazz saxophonist Fred Anderson recorded live in 1980 but not issued until 2000 by Atavistic as part of their Unheard Music Series.

== Background ==
Anderson took his working quartet with trumpeter Billy Brimfield, bassist Larry Hayrod and drummer Hamid Drake to play somewhere in Milwaukee in early 1980 and made arrangements to have a professional 8-track recording made of the concert. 20 years later, when Anderson started to garner attention issuing records more frequently, producer John Corbett released the tapes.

Anderson and Brimfield collaborated since the beginning of the 1960s when they had a pre-AACM quartet. Hayrod was a newcomer to the quartet, replacing Steven Palmore. Anderson and Drake enjoyed a close relationship dating back to the early 1970s.

== Reception ==
Professional ratings
Review scores
Source	Rating
AllMusic	4/5 stars
The Penguin Guide to Jazz	3/4 stars

In his review for AllMusic, Stewart Mason states "Anderson and compatriots are at the top of their game singly and collectively." The Penguin Guide to Jazz says that "there is a tendency to meander through solos in what sounds like a second-gear version of late Coltrane."

In a multiple review for JazzTimes, Harvey Pekar notes that "This is not a free-jazz date; it features five varied and impressive compositions by Anderson and Drake and contains solos based on preset structures."

The PopMatters review by Imre Szeman says that the album "not only allows us to get a glimpse of Anderson in the midst of one of the most exciting periods in his career, but also gives us a chance to hear this Olympian jazz man play live in all his glory."

== Track listing ==
All compositions by Fred Anderson except as indicated

1. "A Ballad for Rita" - 17:01
2. "The Bull" - 19:22
3. "Black Woman" - 13:26
4. "Bombay (Children of Cambodia)" (Hamid Drake) - 10:05
5. "Planet E" - 10:22

== Personnel ==
- Fred Anderson - tenor sax
- Billy Brimfield - trumpet
- Larry Hayrod - bass
- Hamid Drake - drums, tablas
