= The Power of Light (album) =

Live album by Oluyemi Thomas and Henry Grimes
- Released: 2007
- Recorded: July 1, 2006
- Venue: Modern Formations Gallery and Performance Space, Pittsburgh, Pennsylvania
- Genre: Free jazz
- Length: 1:00:06
- Label: Not Two Records; MW 787-2

The Power of Light is a live album by multi-instrumentalist Oluyemi Thomas and bassist Henry Grimes. It was recorded in July 2006 at the Modern Formations Gallery and Performance Space in Pittsburgh, Pennsylvania, and was released in 2007 by Not Two Records

== Reception ==
Professional ratings
Review scores
| Source | Rating |
|---|---|
| Tom Hull – on the Web | B+ |

In a review for Dusted Magazine, Marc Medwin called the album "an immediate and powerful document of improvised music," and wrote: "Once in a great while, a disc comes along that makes believing in the myths a bit easier. It puts the blues and the rituals of joyous communication beyond the craftily narrow constructs in which many half-hearted academics seek to trap them... it affirms again the voices of those brave souls, past and present, who dared to make this music what it is, to endow it with such multivalent and beautiful traditions, steeped in the language of victory over oppression."

John Sharpe, writing for All About Jazz, stated: "In the early stages both men are setting out their stalls, but as the concert progresses the connections become more tangible. The most arresting moments stem from felicitous confluences between the falsetto-register horns pitched against Grimes' wavering arco. Towards the end the combinations of earthy bass first with wood flute and then serpentine soprano take on a satisfyingly elemental, almost ritual cast."

== Track listing ==
1. "Grace for the Race" (Grimes) – 9:36
2. "Water of Thine Eternity" (Thomas) – 4:56
3. "Fractured Flow" (Thomas) – 9:22
4. "Brothers Telling Song" (Grimes) – 8:57
5. "Hidden Mystery" (Thomas) – 7:55
6. "Lightbathers in Soundwaves" (Grimes) – 5:37
7. "Dance of the Planets, Spirits Abounding" (Grimes) – 8:42
8. "Tabernacle" (Thomas) – 5:01

== Personnel ==
- Oluyemi Thomas – bass clarinet, soprano saxophone, musette, gong, flute, percussion
- Henry Grimes – bass
