= Birdhouse (album) =

Studio album by Fred Anderson
- Released: 1996
- Recorded: February 20, 1995 (track 4 April 7, 1994)
- Studio: Sparrow Sound Design, Chicago
- Genre: Jazz
- Length: 62:59
- Label: Okka Disk
- Producer: Fred Anderson, Bruno Johnson

Fred Anderson chronology
Destiny (1995)	Birdhouse (1996)	Fred Chicago Chamber Music (1997)

Birdhouse is an album by the American jazz saxophonist Fred Anderson, released in 1996 on Okka Disk.

The title refers to Anderson's Chicago club that closed in 1978. Three pieces are played by a quartet with pianist Jim Baker and long-time collaborators bassist Harrison Bankhead and drummer Hamid Drake. "Like Sonny" is dedicated to saxophonist Sonny Stitt. The final song, "Waiting for M.C.", is an Anderson-Drake duo from the sessions for the album Destiny (1994) by pianist Marilyn Crispell

== Reception ==
Professional ratings
Review scores
Source	Rating
AllMusic	3/5 stars
The Penguin Guide to Jazz	3/4 stars

In her review for AllMusic, Joslyn Layne stated: "Birdhouse finds tenor sax great Fred Anderson leading his quartet through four originals that cover a spectrum of moods."

The authors of the Penguin Guide to Jazz Recordings wrote: "Birdhouse never quite fires, perhaps because the pianist is so restrictive, though 'Like Sonny', a tribute to Sonny Stitt with no hint of pastiche, is worth the wait."

== Track listing ==
All compositions by Fred Anderson except as indicated

1. "Birdhouse" - 18:55
2. "Bernice" - 16:11
3. "Like Sonny" - 15:33
4. "Waiting for M.C." (Fred Anderson - Hamid Drake) - 12:20

== Personnel ==
- Fred Anderson - tenor sax
- Jim Baker - piano
- Harrison Bankhead - bass
- Hamid Drake - drums
