= 2 Days in April =

Live album by Fred Anderson
- Released: 2000
- Recorded: April 1 & 2, 1999
- Venue: Day 1: Bezanson Recital Hall, UMass, Amherst; Day 2: Killian Hall, MIT, Cambridge
- Genre: Jazz
- Length: 100:14
- Label: Eremite
- Producer: Michael Ehlers

Fred Anderson chronology
The Milwaukee Tapes Vol. 1 (2000)	2 Days in April (2000)	Fred Anderson Quartet Volume Two (2000)

2 Days in April is a double album by a free jazz quartet consisting of saxophonists Fred Anderson and Kidd Jordan, bassist William Parker and drummer Hamid Drake, documenting two 1999 concerts at the University of Massachusetts at Amherst and the Massachusetts Institute of Technology at Cambridge. It was released on Eremite, a label founded by producer Michael Ehlers. Anderson and Jordan first meeting was at a mid-80s AACM concert in Chicago, but this is their first recording together.

== Reception ==
Professional ratings
Review scores
Source	Rating
AllMusic	4.5/5 stars
The Penguin Guide to Jazz Recordings	3.5/4 stars
Tom Hull – on the Web	B−
Encyclopedia of Popular Music	4/5 stars

In his review for AllMusic, Thom Jurek states:

There isn't anything remotely 'inside' about the playing on these two CDs. They are documents of concerts in which two brilliant veteran saxophonists engaged each other, stretched each other's musical vocabularies to the breaking point and pushed their rhythm section into places they hadn't dreamed of going before.

Phil Freeman, writing for Burning Ambulance, commented: "sprawling, sputtering, ferocious liveage featuring two killer, veteran saxophonists and maybe the best rhythm team in early '00s free jazz. A high-water mark for everyone involved."

The authors of the Penguin Guide to Jazz Recordings wrote: "there is no possibility of detachment from this music, which is either a token of its power or a sign that perhaps it is so intensely private that it fails to communicate."

== Track listing ==
All compositions by Anderson / Drake / Jordan / Parker

Disc One: 1st Day

1. – 17:26
2. – 11:55
3. – 15:44
4. – 10:01

Disc Two: 2nd Day

1. – 10:00
2. – 17:17
3. – 17:51

== Personnel ==
- Fred Anderson - tenor sax
- Hamid Drake - drums
- Kidd Jordan - tenor sax
- William Parker - bass
