= Too Tough to Die Live in NYC =

Too Tough To Die Live in NYC is a 2003 album by Dee Dee Ramone, released posthumously through Artmonkey Records / Wanker Records.

The US version released by Artmonkey Records contains selections taken from Dee Dee Ramone's last advertised New York City show at the Spa Club June 2001. The album features Dee Dee Ramone on bass and vocals, Michel Solis on guitar and vocals and Paul Kostabi on drums.

== Track listing ==
1. "53rd & 3rd"
2. "Beat on the Brat"
3. "Mister Postman"
4. "Born to Lose"
5. "Chinese Rocks"
6. "I Want to Be Sedated"
7. "I Don't Care"
8. "Horror Hospital"
9. "Locomotion"

== Personnel ==
- Dee Dee Ramone - vocals & bass
- Paul Kostabi - drums
- Michel Solis - guitar, backing vocals
