= Kidd Jordan =

American saxophonist (1935–2023)

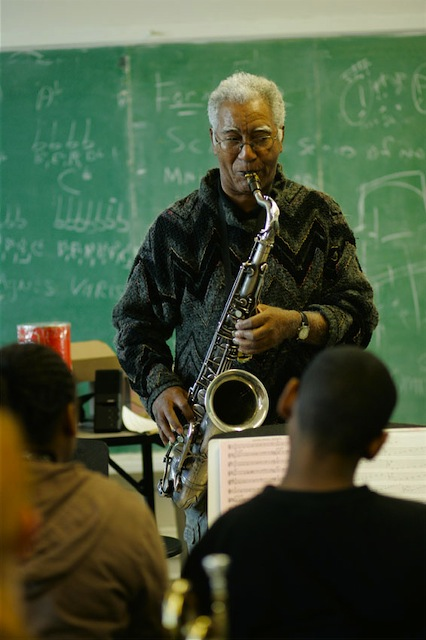
- Jordan at Luscher School

Background information
- Born: Edward Jordan; May 5, 1935; Crowley, Louisiana, U.S.
- Origin: New Orleans, Louisiana, U.S.
- Died: April 7, 2023 (aged 87) New Orleans, Louisiana, U.S.
- Genres: Jazz
- Occupations: Saxophonist, music educator
- Instrument: Saxophone
- Years active: 1950s–2023

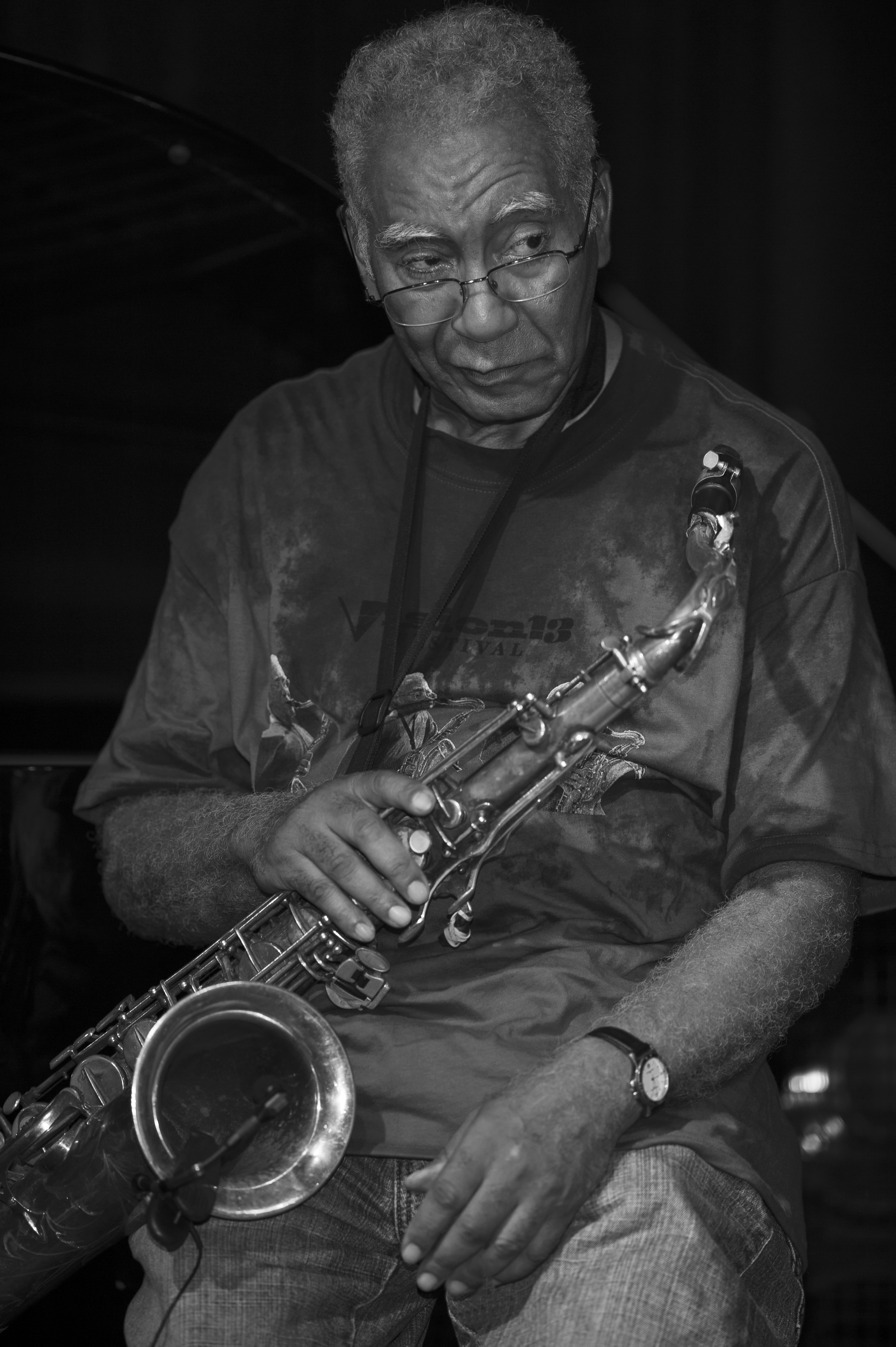
Kidd Jordan, Vision XIII Festival

Edward "Kidd" Jordan (Crowley, May 5, 1935 – April 7, 2023) was an American jazz saxophonist and music educator from New Orleans, Louisiana. He taught at Southern University at New Orleans from 1974 to 2006.

== Biography ==
Jordan was born in Crowley, Louisiana, and was raised during the time when rice farming was the predominant economic activity in the area. Jordan has noted that the music in southwestern Louisiana was "strictly Zydeco and Blues from way around, and that's what I came up listening to." Zydeco musician Clifton Chenier hailed from the same area, as did tenor saxophonist Illinois Jacquet (whose music teacher also instructed Jordan).

Jordan's first instruments were C-melody and alto saxophones. While in high school, Jordan began performing "stock arrangements for three or four saxophones" with some older musicians, and immersed himself in the music of Charlie Parker. Jordan read transcribed solos in Down Beat magazine but also learned Parker's music by ear. He credits Illinois Jacquet with first giving him the idea of playing free improvisation, but was more profoundly affected by the free jazz of Ornette Coleman (who had previously performed in the area with blues bands).

Jordan majored in music education at Southern University in Baton Rouge, attending the school at the same time as his brother-in-law, Alvin Batiste. He originally planned to become a classical alto saxophonist. He moved to New Orleans in 1955, and began playing frequent R&B gigs with musicians such as Guitar Slim, Ray Charles, Big Maybelle, Big Joe Turner, Chuck Willis (with George Adams on baritone) and Choker Campbell. Jordan has described these gigs as being "satisfying for me, because there was a feeling that you'd get from dealing with that. I've played with some of the great female vocalists, from Gladys Knight to Aretha Franklin, or Big Maybelle, Little Esther, Lena Horne, and there's an aesthetic in dealing with those people that a whole lot of people don't get to. And the aesthetic from the Blues is a part of the thing that I want to have in my playing. I don't care how out it gets."

Jordan performed on tenor, baritone, soprano, alto, C-melody and sopranino saxophones, as well as contrabass and bass clarinets. He indicated a preference for playing "outside" music (for example, free improvisation) on tenor, because he closely associated the alto with his earlier study of classical repertoire, tone, and technique. Jordan performed and recorded with a wide selection of musicians in styles ranging from R&B to avant-garde jazz, including Ray Charles, Stevie Wonder, R.E.M., William Parker, Alvin Fielder, Archie Shepp, Fred Anderson, Ornette Coleman, Ellis Marsalis, Cannonball Adderley, Ed Blackwell, and Cecil Taylor. In 2008, he was awarded a lifetime recognition honor by the Vision Festival.

In his performances and recordings, his music was entirely improvised: "Everything you hear on my albums is improvised." he explained. "It's collective improvisation, but there are no tunes. I tried writing down ideas a long time ago but I don't do that anymore.".

The French Ministry of Culture recognized Jordan as a Knight (Chevalier) of the Ordre des Arts et des Lettres in 1985. The French government bestowed him with their highest artistic award for his impetus as a visionary educator and performer.

Jordan taught Donald Harrison and Branford Marsalis while the two were teenagers, and was an instructor at New Orleans Center for Creative Arts (NOCCA). As an instructor of jazz studies at Southern University at New Orleans, Jordan encouraged his students to pursue new approaches to traditional musical forms. One of Jordan's students was trombonist Charles Joseph, who would go on to co-found the Dirty Dozen Brass Band. Jordan composed "Kidd Jordan's Second Line" for the Dirty Dozen Brass Band prior to their first European appearance in 1982, and has also performed with the band.

In 2006, Jordan lost his home and most of his possessions during the aftermath of Hurricane Katrina. A few weeks after the hurricane, he recorded the album Palm of Soul in Brooklyn with William Parker and Hamid Drake. Jordan later returned to Orleans.

In 2007, Kidd Jordan went west with Alvin Fielder and William Parker to play with Prince Lasha and John Handy in The Eddie Gale All Star band for the San Jose Jazz Festival.

On November 7, 2010, Jordan was Inducted into The Louisiana Music Hall Of Fame in an event at Montrele's Bistro in New Orleans.

In 2011, the television series Treme featured a track from Palm of Soul, "Last of the Chicken Wings." Jordan later made a brief appearance in Treme.

Jordan died on April 7, 2023, at the age of 87. He had seven children, all of whom he taught music to. His son Kent Jordan is a jazz flautist and another son, Marlon Jordan, is a jazz trumpeter. His daughter Stephanie Jordan is a jazz vocalist and another, Rachel Jordan, is a classical violinist.

== Discography ==
=== As leader or co-leader ===
- New Orleans Festival Suite (Silkheart, 1999)
- Kidd' Stuff (Danjor, 2001)
- The All-Star Game (Eremite, 2003)
- Live at the Tampere Jazz Happening 2000 (Charles Lester, 2004)
- Palm of Soul (AUM Fidelity, 2006)
- On Fire (Engine, 2011)
- On Fire Volume 2 (Engine, 2012)
- A Night in November (Valid, 2013)
- Trio and Duo in New Orleans (NoBusiness, 2013)
- Live in New Orleans (No Business, 2013)
- Last Trane to New Orleans (2020)

=== As sideman ===
with Larry Williams:

- Bad Boy (Specialty)

with Professor Longhair:

- Mardi Gras in Baton Rouge (Rhino)

with The Improvisational Arts Quintet:

- No Compromise! (Prescription)

with Hamiet Bluiett:

- The Clarinet Family (Black Saint)

with Johnny Adams:

- Good Morning Heartache (Rounder)

with Joel Futterman:

- Revelation (Kali)
- New Orleans Rising (Konnex Records)
- The Joel Futterman / 'Kidd' Jordan Trio with Alvin Fielder-Southern Extreme (Drimala Records)

with William Parker

- Essence of Ellington (Centering, 2012)

with Alan Silva:

- Emancipation Suite (Boxholder, 2002)
- Alan Silva & the Sound Visions Orchestra (Eremite, 2001)
- H.Con.Res.57/Treasure Box (Eremite, 2003)

with R.E.M.:

- Out of Time (Warner Bros. Records)

with Fred Anderson

- 2 Days in April (Eremite, 2000)
- 21st Century Chase (Delmark, 2009)

with World Saxophone Quartet

- Yes We Can (Jazzwerkstatt, 2010)
