= St. Nicholas of Myra Church (Manhattan) =

Church in Manhattan, New York

Coordinates: 40°43′40″N 73°58′58″W

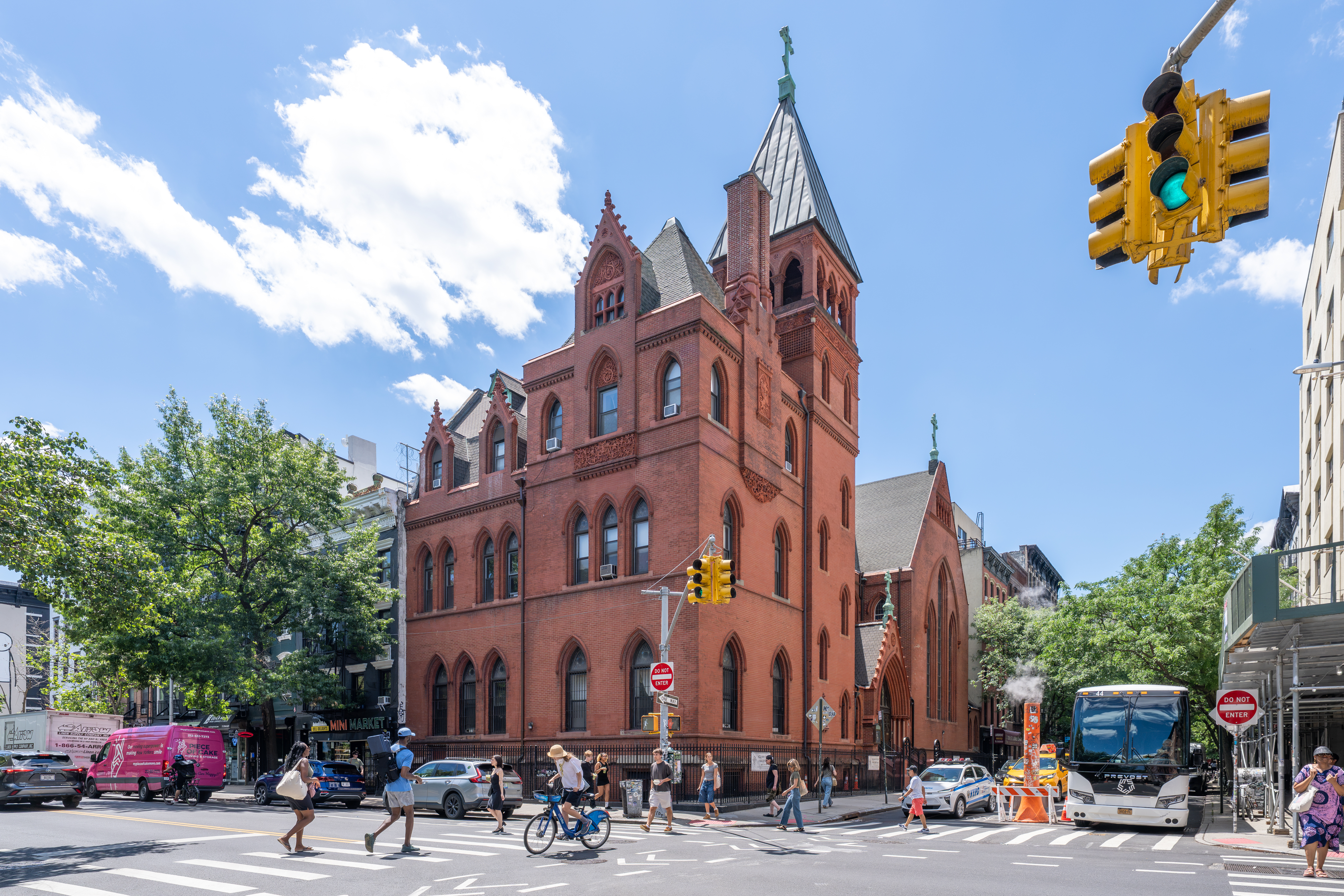
The church as seen from Avenue A in 2026

The St. Nicholas of Myra Church is an American Carpatho-Russian Orthodox Diocese (ACROD) church dedicated to Saint Nicholas, located at 288 East 10th Street, on the corner of Avenue A in the East Village neighborhood of Manhattan, New York City, across from Tompkins Square Park.

The church was built in 1883 as the Memorial Chapel of St. Mark's Church in-the-Bowery, designed in Gothic Revival style by James Renwick Jr. – who also designed Grace Church and St. Patrick's Cathedral – and W. H. Russell. The chapel was a gift of Rutherfurd Stuyvesant, a descendant of the Dutch governor Peter Stuyvesant, in memory of his wife.

The church later became the Holy Trinity Slovak Lutheran Church, and then, in 1925, the ACROD rented it for use as the Church of St. Nicholas of Myra, and bought it outright in 1937. The church draws its parishioners from the tri-state area: New York, New Jersey and Connecticut.

== See also ==
- James Renwick Jr.
- St. Mark's Church in-the-Bowery
- Eastern Orthodoxy in North America
