= Vision Festival =

Annual festival of experimental music, art, film and dance held in New York City

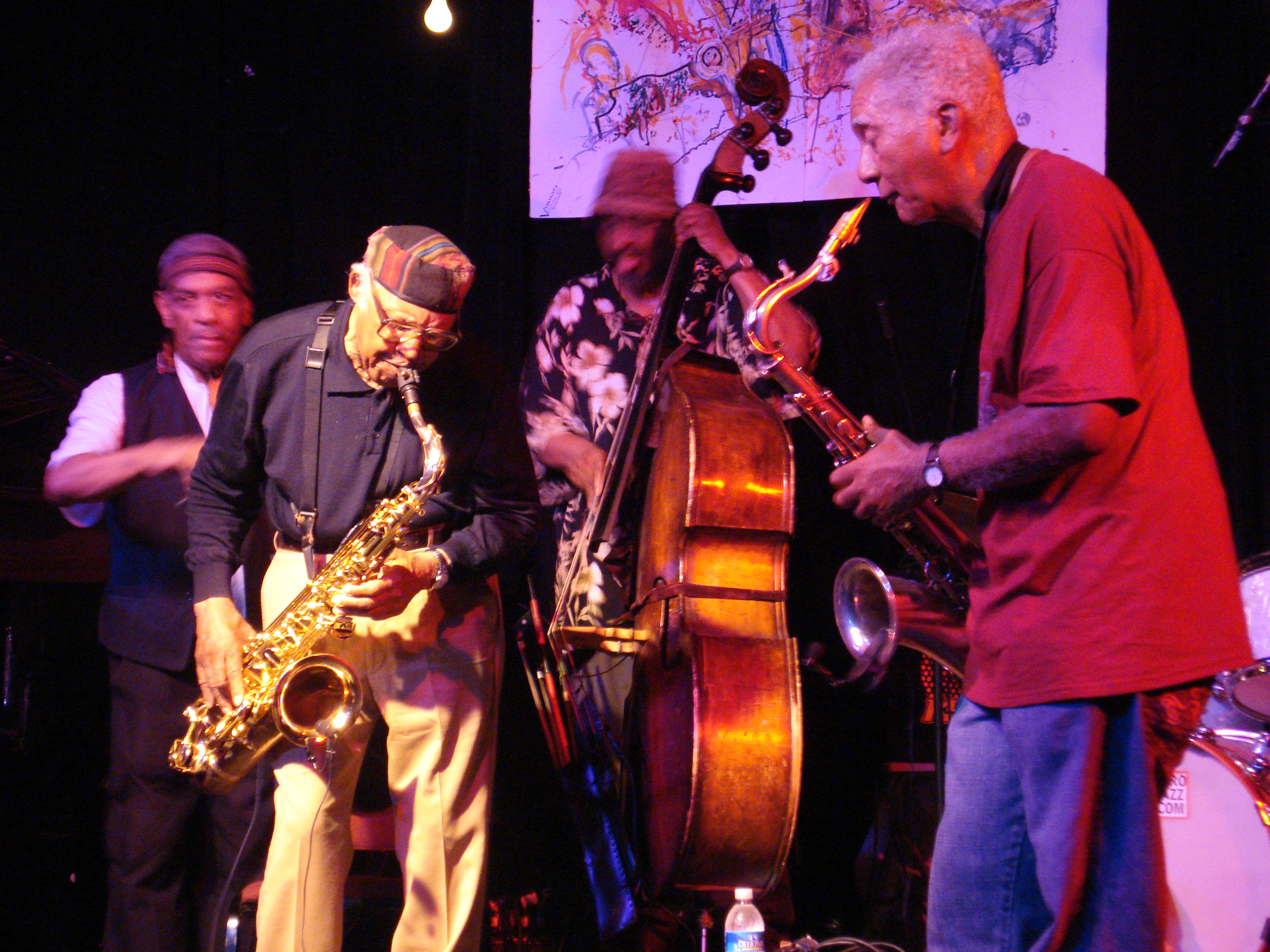
2Final set from Vision Festival XIII, June 11, 2008. From left to right: Billy Bang, Fred Anderson, William Parker and Kidd Jordan.

The Vision Festival is the world's premier festival of experimental music (typically free jazz/avant-garde jazz), art, film and dance, held annually in May/June on the Lower East Side of New York City from 1996 to 2011, in Brooklyn from 2012 to 2014, and returning to Manhattan in 2015. It usually consists of between thirty and sixty performances, spread out over a number of days.

Inspired by the 1984 and 1988 Sound Unity Festivals, it was a direct outgrowth of the seminal but short-lived Improvisors Collective (1994–95). In 1996, the collective's founder, dancer-choreographer Patricia Nicholson Parker, staged the first Vision Festival at the Learning Alliance on Lafayette Street, and subsequently founded the not-for-profit Arts for Art, Inc to organize the festival on an annual basis, along with other events and concert series throughout the year. In addition to Nicholson Parker, other members of Arts for Art's Board of Directors include: Hal Connolly, Patricia Ali, Jo Wood Brown, Whit Dickey, Judy Gage, Patricia Nicholson Parker, William Parker, Todd Nicholson and Patricia Wilkins.

Over the years, the festival has taken place in numerous venues, including the Angel Orensanz Center for the Arts, the St. Nicholas of Myra church basement, the New Age Cabaret (formerly known as the Electric Circus), the Knitting Factory, St. Patrick's youth center, CBGB, Clemente Soto Vélez Cultural Center, the Abrons Arts Center, Roulette Intermedium and Judson Memorial Church.

== Music performers ==
The list of artists who have performed at the Vision Festival is long and varied, including David S. Ware, Cooper-Moore, Sam Rivers, Frank Lowe, Abbey Rader, Daniel Carter, William Parker, Roy Campbell, Jr., Hamid Drake, Nicole Mitchell, Rob Brown, Kidd Jordan, Henry Grimes, Marc Ribot, Chad Taylor, Rashied Ali, Joe McPhee, Jason Kao Hwang, Jayne Cortez, Fred Anderson, Matthew Shipp, Michael Bisio, Billy Bang, Eddie Gale, Whit Dickey, Amiri Baraka, Roscoe Mitchell, Steve Lacy, DJ Spooky, Yo La Tengo, Peter Kowald, Peter Brötzmann, Cat Power and Louis Moholo, among others. The festival also often features special "event" performances, such as the 2004 reunion of the Revolutionary Ensemble, who had not performed publicly together in almost thirty years.

== About Arts for Art, Inc. ==
Arts for Art, Inc. is a multicultural, artist-initiated and artist-run organization whose purpose is to build awareness and understanding of avantjazz and related expressive movements. Our principal activities are the presentation of cutting edge music, multi-discipline performances, and the exhibition of visual arts installations. Arts for Art, is devoted to the presentation of experimental American music from an Afro-American perspective and traditions. Avantjazz is a direct outgrowth of jazz, historically an African-American music. It has gone world wide and gained audience and artists from all cultures. Our programming is multi-racial, reflecting this development of avantjazz into a multi-cultural art form. Yet we respect and encourage the roots of this music, which are essentially black.

=== Arts for Art mission statement ===
Arts For Art supports diversity in music, dance, art and ideas that embrace improvisation as a means to transform both artist and audience. Its mission statement is: "Arts For Art Is Dedicated To The Exceptional Creativity That Originated In The African American Multi-Arts Jazz Culture That Utilizes Improvisation To Express A Larger, More Positive Dream Of Inclusion And Freedom."
