= Velvet Lounge =

Nightclub in Chicago, Illinois, U.S.

Coordinates: 41°53′N 87°38′W

The Velvet Lounge was a nightclub in the South Loop of Chicago. It started as a jazz club and was called the "dusty epicenter of the Midwest's free form jazz scene." It was located at 2128 1/2 S. Indiana Avenue before moving to 67 E. Cermak when the original building was scheduled for demolition. It closed permanently in 2019.

== History ==
The club was established in 1983 by jazz saxophonist Fred Anderson who owned the business until his death in 2010. Many live albums were recorded at the club, including a series of performances featuring Anderson himself, on the Delmark label, and 1998's Live at the Velvet Lounge with Anderson, Peter Kowald, and Hamid Drake. Many prominent musicians played the Velvet Lounge early in their careers, particularly in Sunday night jam sessions. The club's standard lineup of the early 1990s featured trumpeter Billy Brimfield, saxophonist Art Taylor, pianist Jim Baker, bassist Mike Cristol, and drummer Gerald Donovan. From the mid 1990s, the "Velvet Graduates" house band included tenor saxophonist David Boykin, baritone saxophonist Aaron Getsug, alto saxophonist Greg Ward II, bassist Karl E. H. Seigfried, and drummer Isaiah Spencer. After Anderson's death, the club was purchased by a neighboring business which ended the jazz performances and instead presented DJs, hip hop music, and comedians.

In 2013, Mike Reed founded the Constellation club, in part to fill the void left after the Velvet Lounge closed.

== Albums Recorded At The Velvet Lounge ==
- Jemeel Moondoc & William Parker with Hamid Drake - New World Pygmies Vol. 2
- Chicago Trio - Velvet Songs
- Ernest Dawkins' New Horizon Ensemble - Mother's Blue Velvet Shoes

== See also ==
- List of jazz clubs
