= Harrison Bankhead =

American jazz musician (1955–2023)

- Birth name: Harrison Napoleon Bankhead III
- Born: March 1, 1955; Waukegan, Illinois, U.S.
- Died: April 5, 2023 (aged 68)
- Genres: Jazz
- Instrument: Double bass

Harrison Napoleon Bankhead III (March 1, 1955 – April 5, 2023) was an American jazz double-bassist.

== Life and career ==
Bankhead became associated with the Chicago jazz scene in the early-1980s. Early in his career, he performed with Fred Anderson on tour and at Anderson's Chicago club, the Velvet Lounge. Bankhead has worked with Oliver Lake, Roscoe Mitchell, Von Freeman, Malachi Thompson, 8 Bold Souls, and Hamid Drake, and was a member of the Association for the Advancement of Creative Musicians. His first album as a leader, Morning Sun/Harvest Moon, was released on Engine, a sub-label of ESP-Disk, in 2011, and featured sidemen Edward Wilkerson, Jr., Mars Williams, James Sanders, Avreeayl Ra, and Ernie Adams. He followed this with Velvet Blue, with Wilkerson, Williams, and Ra, whose name and title track pay tribute to Fred Anderson and the Velvet Lounge.

Bankhead died on April 5, 2023, at the age of 68.

== Discography ==
As leader

- Morning Sun/Harvest Moon (Engine Studios, 2011)
- Velvet Blue (Engine Studios, 2013)
- The Fire of Compassion (Engine Studios, 2014)

With Malachi Thompson

- The Jaz Life (Delmark, 1992)
- Lift Every Voice (Delmark, 1993)
- Buddy Bolden's Rag (Delmark, 1995)
- 47th Street (Delmark, 1997)
- Freebop Now! (Delmark, 1998)
- Rising Daystar (Delmark, 1999)
- Talking Horns (Delmark, 2001) with Hamiet Bluiett and Oliver Lake
- Blue Jazz (Delmark, 2003) with Gary Bartz and Billy Harper

With 8 Bold Souls

- Sideshow (Arabesque Jazz, 1992)
- Ant Farm (Arabesque Jazz, 1994)
- Last Option (Thrill Jockey, 2000)

With Dee Alexander

- Wild is the Wind (BluJazz, 2009)
- Songs My Mother Loves (BluJazz, 2014)

With others

- Frequency (Edward Wilkerson, Nicole Mitchell, Harrison Bankhead, and Avreeayl Ra) - Frequency (Thrill Jockey, 2006)
- Fred Anderson/Harrison Bankhead - The Great Vision Concert (Ayler Records, 2007)
- Nicole Mitchell, Harrison Bankhead, Hamid Drake - Indigo Trio: Live in Montreal (2007)
- The Turbine! (Harrison Bankhead, Benjamin Duboc, Hamid Drake, Ramon Lopez) - Entropy/Enthalpy (RogueArt, 2015)
- Shanta Nurullah's Sitarsys, Sitar Black (Storywiz, 2016)
