= Ann E. Ward =

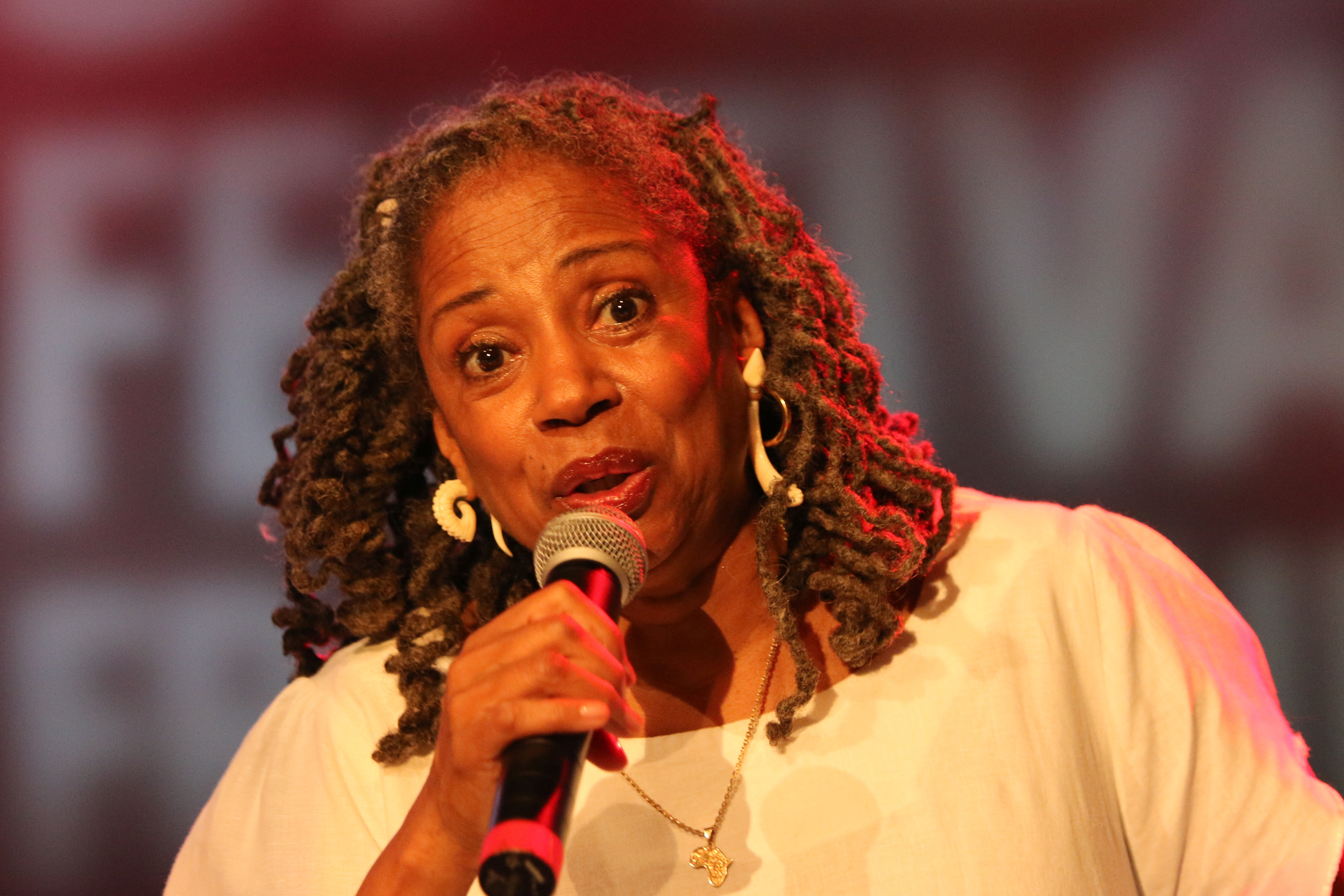
- Ann E. Ward

Background information
- Born: 1949; Chicago
- Died: July 18, 2016 (aged 66–67)
- Genres: Creative Music
- Occupations: Performer, Composer, Educator
- Instruments: Piano, Vocals, Percussion

Ann E. Ward was an improviser, composer and educator, and a long-serving member of the Association for the Advancement of Creative Musicians (AACM). A native of Chicago who studied music from a young age, she attended Chicago Musical College of Roosevelt University, studying piano, and graduated from Kentucky State College with a degree in music composition. After performing as a vocalist with the Ken Chaney Experience, she joined the AACM in 1981, eventually becoming an integral part of the organization. Ward was one of the most noted female composers in the AACM, and performed with many ensembles such as the Great Black Music Ensemble and Samana as a vocalist, pianist and African percussionist. She served as the director of the AACM School from 1983 to 2008, volunteering her time to take an active role in music education. Ward died in 2016 at age 67.

== Early life and education ==
Ward grew up in a highly musical family that listened to many different types of music, and started piano lessons at the age of four. She graduated from Englewood High School in 1967 with a four-year scholarship in music at Kentucky State University, where she studied with Frederick Tillis, pursuing her goal to become a composer. While at KSU, she also took part in the Black Student Union, and formed a gospel choir at the school.

== Musical career ==
=== Early career ===
Ward had a varied career as an artist and community leader. After graduating from college in 1973, she auditioned for pianist and composer Ken Chaney, and sang and toured with the Ken Chaney Experience for three years before joining the AACM.

She was a pianist and music director for productions including Kuumba, ETA, Chocolate Chip, Steppenwolf, North Light and the Chicago Theater, and served as the Minister of Music At Chatham Bethlehem Presbyterian Church for over 20 years. She was also featured on the final track of Uncommon Time, an album by flautist Janice Misurell-Mitchell released in 2010.

=== AACM ===
Ward served as a member of the Association for the Advancement of Creative Musicians for nearly four decades: from 1981 to her death in 2016. She composed and performed for numerous ensembles within the organization, including Samana, the AACM Vocal Ensemble, the Experimental Ensemble, and the AACM Great Black Music Ensemble. She was present for many of the AACM's major concerts and events, and is featured on at least two of the organization's live recordings.

In April 1994, Ward was featured at the second annual Women of the New Jazz Festival in Chicago. She performed alongside Maia and Shanta Nurullah in Samana and led her own quartet, AWard, and her arrangements were described as “fascinating,” mentioning a “marvelous thumb piano trio” backing flutist Ari Brown.

Ward performed as part of the AACM's 35th Anniversary Celebration in April 2000 as part of a large ensemble led by Douglas Ewart. She appeared in a series of concerts in May 2005 marking the AACM's 40th Anniversary. The first was held at the Chicago Cultural Center with the AACM Experimental Chamber Ensemble which also included Nicole Mitchell, Douglas R. Ewart, Edward Wilkerson Jr., Mwata Bowden, Ari Brown, and Dushun Mosley. She participated in “Historical Perspectives” at Chicago's Museum of Contemporary Art along with five other AACM members, and later in the evening performed with George Lewis in an “affectionate and comedic" duo. Ward also featured on a live recording of the AACM Great Black Music Ensemble at the Umbria Jazz Festival in 2009.

During 2015 Ward was active in several important AACM events. For the AACM's 50th Anniversary she is featured in “Cutting Edge Spirit Music: The Women of the AACM” at the DuSable Museum that included a performance and conversation about women in music. She also appeared as part of the AACM Experimental Ensemble on A Suite Unheard, recorded in honor of the AACM's 50th Anniversary. In July she performed with AACM leaders Ernest Dawkins, Taalib-Din Ziyad and Art Turk Burton in “Interactive Healing Concerts in Bronzville,” a series of events that emphasized the spiritual healing power of music. In October 2015 she joined the International Contemporary Ensemble (ICE) for a performance of George Lewis’s Afterword: The AACM (as) Opera at Chicago’s Museum of Contemporary Art.

== Impact as an Educator ==
Ward was a notable figure in arts education in Chicago, and, as her obituary in Downbeat states, had a passion for “educating and inspiring new generations of artists.” Along with teaching music at the Betty Shabazz International Charter Schools, she served as the director of the AACM School from 1983 to 2008. Ward was beloved by many in the Chicago arts community, and her values as a teacher reflect her role in the AACM as a creative improviser.

Ward taught at the AACM school, making the program tuition-free. In 1992 Ward;'s school was housed in a small space above an ice cream store; eventually classes took place on the campus of Chicago State University. Ward was involved in education throughout her life, leading the school in a “program of Great Black Music” at the Museum of Contemporary Art in Chicago in 2015.

Ward's approach to education centered on self-expression and the importance of African American cultural traditions. She taught music in a way that allowed for open-mindedness and exploration. She “insisted that my children learn the qualities of each sound in the musical alphabet.” Along with the students she would ask questions such as ‘Is it tight? Is it wide? Is it thick? Is it thin? Is it low and deep?’” She encouraged students to develop and alter written musical phrases, in order to discover that “music is a means toward expressing themselves”.

Vocalist Saalik Ziyad called Ward a “beautiful spirit”. His father, Taalib Din-Ziyad said Ward “had a great, wise encompassing influence on the black community through her music and teaching. She was always about teaching the children, not just about music, but life.”
