= Velvet Blue =

Studio album by Harrison Bankhead
- Released: 2013
- Recorded: March 29, 2013
- Studio: Northfire Recording Studios, Amherst, Massachusetts
- Genre: Jazz
- Label: Engine Studios e052

Harrison Bankhead chronology
Morning Sun/Harvest Moon (2011)	Velvet Blue (2013)	The Fire of Compassion (2014)

Velvet Blue is the second album by American jazz double-bassist Harrison Bankhead. It was recorded in March 2013 in Amherst, Massachusetts, and was released later that year by Engine Studios. On the album, Bankhead is joined by saxophonists Mars Williams and Edward Wilkerson, and drummer Avreeayl Ra.

The title track is an homage to the Velvet Lounge, the club owned by saxophonist Fred Anderson.

== Reception ==
Professional ratings
Review scores
Source	Rating
All About Jazz	3.5/5 stars

Writing for All About Jazz, Mark Corroto commented: "Harrison Bankhead's time has come. The... AACM is on a roll with the release of Velvet Blue... this isn't just a blowing session. The bassist's AACM affiliation necessitates the exploration of meditative sounds."

In an article for Something Else!, S. Victor Aaron remarked: "Harrison Bankhead's second album confirms that Morning Sun Harvest Moon was no one-off fluke... [he] makes the case once again he's not only a first-rate bassist but a creator of adventurous jazz who deserves much wider notice. Velvet Blue confirms his ability to lead records that can stand right alongside the stronger records of his better-known bosses."

Peter Margasak, writing for the Chicago Reader, stated: "It's another diverse, satisfying effort from Bankhead, a bandleader who knows when to stay out of the way. Here's hoping the recordings and shows keep coming."

== Track listing ==
1. "Velvet Blue" – 15:15
2. "After Hours" – 9:11
3. "Right on It" – 6:41
4. "Ancestors of the Pharoahs of Nabta Playa" – 9:08
5. "Take It to the Bridge Ya'll" – 4:59
6. "Rhythm of the Earth" – 13:55
7. "A Sketch of Stravinski" – 13:55

== Personnel ==
- Harrison Bankhead – bass, marimba, piano
- Mars Williams – alto saxophone, tenor saxophone, soprano saxophone, kalimba
- Edward Wilkerson – tenor saxophone, clarinet, alto clarinet, didgeridoo, harmonica
- Avreeayl Ra – drums, thumb piano
