= Michael Logan (bassist) =

American jazz musician

Michael Logan is an American jazz bassist. He worked with, among others, Muhal Richard Abrams, Walter Bishop Jr., Artie Simmons and the Jazz Samaritans, and Clifford Jordan.

In 1974 he collaborated with the Italian singer-songwriter and musician Giuni Russo in writing her first album, Love Is a Woman (1975), entirely in English. In particular, he wrote the entire song Every Time You Leave.

== Discography ==
- 1990: Night Out (Muse Records) with Cecil Brooks III, Benny Green, Joe Ford, Houston Person

== Songs written for other artists ==
- 1975: Love Is a Woman for Giuni Russo (lyrics by Giuni Russo, music by Michael Logan), released on Love Is a Woman;
- 1975: Every Time You Leave for Giuni Russo (lyrics and music by Michael Logan), released on Love Is a Woman;
- 1975: Carol for Giuni Russo (lyrics by Giuni Russo, music by Michael Logan), released on Love Is a Woman;
- 1975: Suddenly I'm Alone for Giuni Russo (lyrics by Giuni Russo, music by Michael Logan), released on Love Is a Woman;
- 1975: Acting the Part for Giuni Russo (lyrics by Giuni Russo, music by Michael Logan), released on Love Is a Woman;
- 1975: Give Me One Reason for Giuni Russo (lyrics by Giuni Russo, music by Michael Logan), released on Love Is a Woman;
- 1975: If You Really Wanna Say Goodbye for Giuni Russo (lyrics by Giuni Russo, music by Michael Logan), released on Love Is a Woman
