= Ant Farm (album) =

Studio album by 8 Bold Souls
- Released: 1994
- Recorded: July 30 and 31, 1994, and August 3, 1994
- Studio: Streeterville, Chicago
- Genre: Jazz
- Length: 1:02:38
- Label: Arabesque; AJ0114
- Producer: 8 Bold Souls

8 Bold Souls chronology
| Sideshow (1992) | Ant Farm (1994) | Last Option (2000) |

Ant Farm is the third album by the jazz group 8 Bold Souls. It was recorded in July and August 1994 in Chicago and was released later that year by Arabesque Records. The album features performances by saxophonist, clarinetist, and composer Edward Wilkerson, saxophonist Mwata Bowden, trumpeter Robert Griffin, Jr., trombonist Isaiah Jackson, tubist Aaron Dodd, cellist Naomi Millender, bassist Harrison Bankhead, and drummer Dushun Mosley.

== Reception ==
Professional ratings
Review scores
| Source | Rating |
|---|---|
| AllMusic | 3/5 stars |
| The Penguin Guide to Jazz | 3.5/4 stars |

In a review for AllMusic, Brian Olewnick wrote: "All the pieces are by leader Wilkerson, tending toward a jaunty swing spiced with a tinge of down-home rhythm and blues and a taste of gospel. Once again, his ensemble is made up of all fine instrumentalists, playing the written parts with verve and improvising imaginatively."

The authors of the Penguin Guide to Jazz Recordings awarded the album 3 1/2 stars, calling it "a fine continuation" of the band's previous release, Sideshow. They noted that Wilkerson's "debt to Henry Threadgill's early work is... clear," and commented: "the group has its own democratic character: Jackson, Bowden and Griffin impress as individual voices, growing in stature, and the leader's writing always seems to have a surprise up its sleeve."

== Track listing ==
All compositions by Edward Wilkerson.

1. "Half Life" – 8:52
2. "A Little Encouragement" – 9:29
3. "Ant Farm" – 16:07
4. "The Corner of Walk and Don't Walk" – 10:12
5. "Furthest From My Mind" – 9:35
6. "The Big Dig" – 8:21

== Personnel ==
- Edward Wilkerson – alto saxophone, tenor saxophone, alto clarinet, clarinet, voice
- Mwata Bowden – baritone saxophone, tenor saxophone, clarinet, bass clarinet, voice
- Robert Griffin, Jr. – trumpet, piccolo trumpet, voice
- Isaiah Jackson – trombone, timbales, voice
- Aaron Dodd – tuba, voice
- Naomi Millender – cello, voice
- Harrison Bankhead – bass, voice
- Dushun Mosley – drums, congas, voice
