= 8 Bold Souls =

American jazz ensemble

8 Bold Souls is an American jazz ensemble, led by reedist Edward Wilkerson.

The group was founded in 1985 by Wilkerson, also associated with the Association for the Advancement of Creative Musicians. They began at Chicago Filmmakers, a performance spot in Chicago, where they played on Thursdays. The performances were dubbed "New Music for 8 Bold Souls", and the group eventually adopted the shortened name for performances elsewhere. 8 Bold Souls were active intermittently through the 1990s, recording for Arabesque Records, and in 1999 released an album on Thrill Jockey, following it with performances at the Chicago Symphony Center and at festivals.

Mwata Bowden is among the musicians to play in the group. Other members include trumpeter Robert Griffin, trombonist Isaiah Jackson, original tubist Aaron Dodd and tubist Gerald Powell, cellist Naomi Millender, original bassist Richard Jess Brown, Jr. (also known as Jess Brown and R. Jess Brown, Jr.), bassist Harrison Bankhead, original percussionist Steve McCall and percussionist Dushun Mosley.

Aaron Dodd died on June 17, 2010, due to complications of chronic obstructive pulmonary disease. In addition to his time with 8 Bold Souls, Dodd worked with Leroy Hutson, The Pharaohs and he recorded for Motown Records with Donny Hathaway.

Naomi Millender died in 2018. Harrison Bankhead died in 2023.

== Discography ==
- 8 Bold Souls (Sessoms Records, 1987)
- Sideshow (Arabesque, 1992)
- Ant Farm (Arabesque, 1994)
- Last Option (Thrill Jockey, 2000)
