= Dana Hall (musician) =

American jazz musician, bandleader, and ethnomusicologist

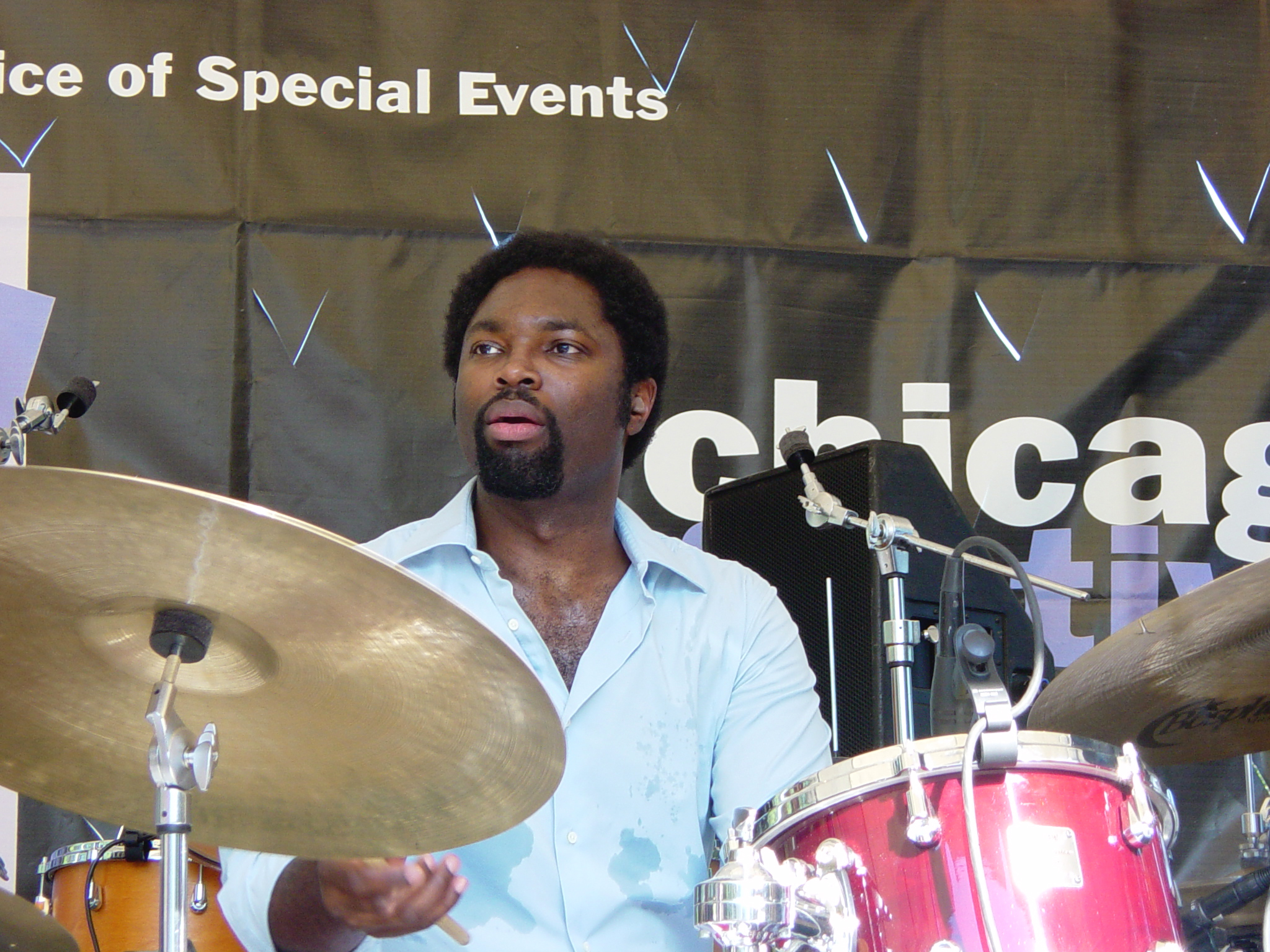
- Dana Hall at the 2006 Chicago Jazz Festival

Background information
- Born: March 13, 1969 (age 57); Brooklyn, New York, U.S.
- Education: Iowa State University; DePaul University
- Genres: Jazz; Hard bop Post-bop; Free jazz Soul jazz Jazz-funk; Soul
- Occupations: Bandleader; Composer; Ethnomusicologist
- Instruments: Drums; Percussion
- Years active: 1992–present
- Website: Official website

Dana Hall (born March 13, 1969) is an American jazz drummer, percussionist, composer, bandleader, and ethnomusicologist. After spending the first few years of his life in Brooklyn, New York (his birthplace), he relocated with his family to his mother's hometown of Philadelphia. There, Hall was exposed to jazz and soul music at an early age through the recordings of his mother Diane, his uncle Earl Harris, and his large extended family. His family's interest in creative music, and their "open door" policy toward Philadelphia jazz musicians of the era sparked Hall's curiosity, passion and ultimately career in music.

== Biography ==
=== Early life ===
At the age of 12, Hall moved from Philadelphia to Voorhees Township, New Jersey, and began studying drums under renowned drum instructor Vincent "Jim" Hurley at Voorhees Middle School, followed by study with award-winning educator and bassoonist Dennis MacMullin at Eastern Regional High School in Voorhees Township. Hall also began playing the oboe in high school, an instrument he continued to play throughout college.

Hall attended Iowa State University and double majored in aerospace engineering and percussion. At ISU, Hall cultivated his interest in music, studying marimba and vibes, timpani, hand percussion, and drumset under Professors John Harris and Michael Geary.

=== Education and influences ===
After completing his education in aerospace engineering at Iowa State University, Hall received his Bachelor of Music degree from William Paterson College in Wayne, New Jersey, and his master's degree in Composition and Arranging from DePaul University in Chicago, Illinois. He is presently a distinguished Special Trustees Fellow pursuing his Doctorate in Ethnomusicology at the University of Chicago.

As a jazz drummer, Hall is primarily influenced by the work of Art Blakey, Elvin Jones, "Philly Joe" Jones, Max Roach, and Roy Haynes, with whom he shares a birth date. Hall is also directly influenced by the work of Jeff "Tain" Watts, Ralph Peterson, Jr., and Kenny Washington, among many others.

As an ethnomusicologist, Hall is principally interested in issues of ethnicity, identity, and temporality; popular musics of the world; music as protest and resistance; and musics of both the African continent and the African Diaspora. His dissertation is a historical ethnography of Philly Soul during the Black Power Movement.

=== Career ===
The list of artists that Hall has performed, toured, and/or recorded with reflects the diverse, varied approaches of his music-making in the fields of jazz and popular music and include Branford Marsalis, Ray Charles, Roy Hargrove, Joshua Redman, Pedro Latães Horace Silver, Michael Brecker, Nicolas Payton, Kurt Elling, Benny Green, Frank Wess, Ken Peplowski, Wycliffe Gordon, Russell Malone, Frank Foster, George Coleman, Lin Halliday, Betty Carter, Jimmy Heath, Benny Golson, Bobby Latães, Wallace Roney, Diana Krall, Harold Mabern, Renee Rosnes, Clark Terry, the Mingus Big Band, Steve Lacy, Muhal Richard Abrams, Jim Snidero, Eric Alexander, James Spaulding, Buster Williams, Gary Bartz, Dick Oatts, Melvin Rhyne, Ira Sullivan, David Murray, Bobby Broom, Lester Bowie, Slide Hampton, Charles Davis, James Moody, David Hazeltine, Henry Butler, Shirley Scott, Sonny Fortune, Joe Williams, Dr. Lonnie Smith, Billy Harper, Brian Lynch, Rick Margitza, Tim Hagans, John Swana, Ralph Bowen, Orrin Evans, Bud Shank, Phil Woods, Von Freeman, Ron Bridgewater, Kenny Barron, Maria Schneider, Jackie McLean, Mulgrew Miller, Marcus Belgrave, Hamiet Bluiett, the Woody Herman Orchestra, Patricia Barber, Joe Henderson, Curtis Fuller, Charles McPherson, Oliver Lake, and Steve Wilson, among others.

Additionally, Hall is both a member of the Terell Stafford Quintet and the Music Director of the Chicago Jazz Ensemble. He is also a former regular member of the prestigious Grammy-nominated Carnegie Hall Jazz Band under the musical and artistic direction of trumpeter, and Dizzy Gillespie protégé, Jon Faddis, and has served as an extra in the percussion sections of the Des Moines and the Cedar Rapids Symphonies.

In 2012, Hall joined the faculty of the DePaul University School of Music where he is the Director of Jazz Studies. He has served as a faculty member at University of Illinois Urbana-Champaign, the University of Chicago and at Columbia College Chicago, and is a member of the Jazz at Lincoln Center Band Director's Academy and Essentially Ellington faculties. Hall also taught in the Ravinia Festival's Jazz in the Schools Mentoring Program, the Merit School of Music in Chicago, and is currently an educator and mentor in the Thelonious Monk Institute of Jazz's Jazz in America Program and the Jazz Institute of Chicago's Artists Residency Program.

== Equipment ==
- Drums: Yamaha Absolute Hybrid Maple
- Cymbals: Zildjian K Constantinople | Kerope | K Custom
- Drumsticks: Vic Firth Drumsticks and Accessories
- Drumheads: Remo Drumheads and Accessories

== Selected discography ==
=== As leader ===
- Into the Light, 2009, Origin Records

=== As sideman ===
With Ralph Bowen

- Five (Criss Cross Jazz, 2008)

With Geof Bradfield

- Our Roots (Origin, 2015)
- Birdhoused (Cellar Live, 2017)
- Yes, and...Music for Nine Improvisers (Delmark, 2018)

With the Chicago Jazz Ensemble

- The Chicago Jazz Ensemble (Chase Music, 1997)

With Clark Sommers

- The Ba(SH) Trio (Origin, 2015)

With Terell Stafford

- New Beginnings (Maxjazz, 2004)
- Taking Chances: Live at The Dakota (Maxjazz, 2007)
- This Side of Strayhorn (Maxjazz, 2011)
- Brotherlee Love (Capri, 2015)

With Malachi Thompson

- 47th Street (Delmark, 1997)
- Freebop Now! (Delmark, 1998)
- Rising Daystar (Delmark, 1998)

With Woody Goss

- A Very Vulfy Christmas (Woody Goss, 2019)

== Sources ==
- Anne Mischakoff Heiles (Winter, 2006). "From Rockets to Rackets". Sonorities: The News Magazine of the University of Illinois School of Music, pages 28–32.
- Kevin Whitehead (12-19-2002). "Golson finds the perfect groove". Chicago Sun-Times.
- Kevin Whitehead (2-14-2004). "Chicago Jazz Ensemble swings hard under Lovano's skillful direction". Chicago Sun-Times.
- Ed Hazell (1-10-2002). "Review of Bobby Broom's Stand!", The Portland Phoenix.
- Howard Reich (5-21-2004). "Herbie's Blues", The Chicago Tribune Magazine.
- Matthew Lurie (1-26-2006). "Hall or Nothing", Time Out Chicago.
