= Zane Massey =

American jazz musician

Zane Wayne Massey (born 1957) is an American jazz saxophonist.

Massey was born in Philadelphia but raised in New York City. He is the son of Cal Massey and played in his father's band when he was young. He began his professional career in the 1970s, working with Earl Freeman, Carlos Garnett, and then Ronald Shannon Jackson, with whom he toured and recorded extensively until the late 1980s. He appeared with Sun Ra at the Chicago Jazz Festival in 1984 and also worked with Jemeel Moondoc around the same time. Starting in the mid-1980s, he began organizing bands for the Music Under New York project, including for a performance of Cal Massey's Liberation Suite. In the 1990s he performed with Roy Campbell and recorded under his own name for Delmark Records.

== Discography ==
- Brass Knuckles (Delmark Records, 1993)
- Safe to Imagine (Delmark, 1995)

With Malachi Thompson

- Buddy Bolden's Rag (Delmark, 1995)
