= Uptown/Downtown =

Live album by McCoy Tyner
- Released: 1989
- Recorded: November 25 & 26, 1988
- Venue: The Blue Note, NYC
- Genre: Jazz
- Label: Milestone

McCoy Tyner chronology
Revelations (1988)	Uptown/Downtown (1989)	Live at Sweet Basil (1989)

Professional ratings
Review scores
Source	Rating
Allmusic	4.5/5 stars
The Penguin Guide to Jazz Recordings	3.5/4 stars

Uptown/Downtown is a 1988 live album by McCoy Tyner released on the Milestone label, his first for the label since 13th House (1980). It was recorded in November 1988 and features performances by Tyner's Big Band, which included tenor saxophonists Junior Cook and Ricky Ford, trumpeter Kamau Adilifu and trombonist Steve Turre, recorded at the Blue Note jazz club in New York City. The Allmusic review by Scott Yanow states that "the results are quite memorable and frequently exciting. Recommended".

== Track listing ==
1. "Love Surrounds Us Everywhere" - 8:25
2. "Three Flowers" - 6:56
3. "Genesis" - 7:57
4. "Uptown" - 7:11
5. "Lotus Flower" (Turre) - 6:52
6. "Blues for Basie" - 9:34

All compositions by McCoy Tyner except as indicated
- Recorded at the Blue Note, NYC, November 25 & 26, 1988.

== Personnel ==
- McCoy Tyner – piano, arranger
- Kamau Adilifu – trumpet
- Earl Gardner – trumpet
- Virgil Jones – trumpet
- Robin Eubanks – trombone, arranger
- Steve Turre – trombone, didgeridoo, arranger
- John Clark – french horn
- Howard Johnson – tuba
- Joe Ford – alto saxophone, soprano saxophone, flute
- Doug Harris – alto saxophone, soprano saxophone, flute
- Junior Cook – tenor saxophone
- Ricky Ford – tenor saxophone
- Avery Sharpe – double bass, electric bass
- Louis Hayes – drums
- Dennis Denizia – arrangers
- Jerry Hey – arrangers
