= 8 Bold Souls (album) =

Studio album by 8 Bold Souls
- Released: 1987
- Recorded: 1986
- Studio: Chicago Recording Company, Chicago
- Genre: Jazz
- Length: 51:33
- Label: Sessoms; 0002
- Producer: Shadow Vignettes Productions

8 Bold Souls chronology
8 Bold Souls (1987)	Sideshow (1992)

8 Bold Souls is the debut album by the jazz group of the same name. It was recorded in 1986 in Chicago, and was released in 1987 by Sessoms Records. The album features performances by saxophonist, clarinetist, and composer Edward Wilkerson, saxophonist Mwata Bowden, trumpeter Robert Griffin, Jr., trombonist Isaiah S. Jackson, Jr., tubist Aaron Dodd, cellist Naomi Millender, bassist Richard Jess Brown, Jr., and drummer Dushun Mosley.

Wilkerson founded Sessoms Records in 1986 in order to release an album by his big band, Shadow Vignettes. He recalled: "I had a car trunk filled with records and all of these dudes would laugh at me, but I didn't care. I had to sell my stuff."

== Reception ==
Professional ratings
Review scores
Source	Rating
AllMusic	4/5 stars
The Virgin Encyclopedia of Jazz	5/5 stars

The editors of AllMusic awarded the album 4 stars.

Writer John Corbett stated: "The record has things in common with the group of jazz composers writing 'architecturally' for chamber-sized ensembles, like David Murray, John Carter, Anthony Davis, and especially [Henry] Threadgill. But it is unique, both in Wilkerson's singular compositional style and in its evidence of the developing group dynamic. Evocative textures float elegantly through shifting meters, easily slipping into another funky world."

In an article for The Washington Post, Mike Joyce noted that the group "features a vibrant and occasionally incendiary reed and brass section," and commented: "Several tracks veer from traditional big bang harmonies into braying cacophony and explosive solos, spurred on relentlessly by drummer Dushum Mosley and bassist Robert Jess Brown Jr."

== Track listing ==
All compositions by Edward Wilkerson.

1. "The Hunt" – 9:22
2. "Shining Waters" – 9:09
3. "Dervish" – 7:10
4. "Chapel Hill" – 11:29
5. "Through the Drapes" – 7:44
6. "Favorite Son" – 6:31

== Personnel ==
- Edward Wilkerson – alto saxophone, tenor saxophone, alto clarinet, clarinet
- Mwata Bowden – baritone saxophone, tenor saxophone, clarinet
- Robert Griffin, Jr. – trumpet, flugelhorn
- Isaiah S. Jackson, Jr. – trombone, ram's horn
- Aaron Dodd – tuba
- Naomi Millender – cello
- Richard Jess Brown, Jr. – bass
- Dushun Mosley – drums, percussion
