= Sideshow (album) =

Studio album by 8 Bold Souls
- Released: 1992
- Recorded: November 23, 24, and 25, 1991
- Studio: Streeterville, Chicago
- Genre: Jazz
- Length: 1:05:58
- Label: Arabesque; AJ0103
- Producer: 8 Bold Souls

8 Bold Souls chronology
8 Bold Souls (1987)	Sideshow (1992)	Ant Farm (1994)

Sideshow is the second album by the jazz group 8 Bold Souls. It was recorded in November 1991 in Chicago, and was released in 1992 by Arabesque Records. The album features performances by saxophonist, clarinetist, and composer Edward Wilkerson, saxophonist Mwata Bowden, trumpeter Robert Griffin, Jr., trombonist Isaiah Jackson, tubist Aaron Dodd, cellist Naomi Millender, bassist Harrison Bankhead, and drummer Dushun Mosley.

== Reception ==
Professional ratings
Review scores
Source	Rating
AllMusic	4/5 stars
Los Angeles Times	2/4 stars
The Penguin Guide to Jazz	3.5/4 stars
The Virgin Encyclopedia of Jazz	3/5 stars

In a review for AllMusic, Brian Olewnick wrote: "The entire cast of musicians is solid and creative... Sideshow is one of the finest and most unduly neglected jazz albums of the '90s and is highly recommended." The authors of The Penguin Guide to Jazz Recordings awarded the album 3½ stars, and stated: "By emphasizing the unusual timbres of the instrumentation... [the] band creates a singular ensemble sound that is finally more interesting than the often impassioned solos... the stealthy, deliberate pace of the record is... hypnotic." The Los Angeles Times determined that it "lacks the vibrant, swinging side this band has displayed in the past."

== Track listing ==
1. "Black Herman" (Wilkerson) – 17:11
2. "Glass Breakers" (Wilkerson) – 10:42
3. "Lonely Woman" (Ornette Coleman) – 16:52
4. "Sideshow" (Wilkerson) – 13:09
5. "Light on the Path" (Wilkerson) – 8:02

== Personnel ==
- Edward Wilkerson – alto saxophone, tenor saxophone, bass saxophone, alto clarinet, clarinet
- Mwata Bowden – baritone saxophone, tenor saxophone, clarinet
- Robert Griffin, Jr. – trumpet, flugelhorn
- Isaiah Jackson – trombone
- Aaron Dodd – tuba
- Naomi Millender – cello
- Harrison Bankhead – bass
- Dushun Mosley – drums, percussion
