= Morning Sun/Harvest Moon =

Studio album by Harrison Bankhead
- Released: 2011
- Recorded: April 11, 2010
- Studio: Fullerton Recording Studios, Chicago
- Genre: Jazz
- Label: Engine Studios e039

Harrison Bankhead chronology
Morning Sun/Harvest Moon (2011)	Velvet Blue (2013)

Morning Sun/Harvest Moon is the debut album by American jazz double-bassist Harrison Bankhead. It was recorded in April 2010 in Chicago, and was released in 2011 by Engine Studios. On the album, Bankhead is joined by saxophonists Mars Williams and Edward Wilkerson, violinist James Sanders, percussionist Ernie Adams, and drummer Avreeayl Ra.

== Reception ==
Professional ratings
Review scores
Source	Rating
AllMusic	4/5 stars
All About Jazz	4/5 stars
Tom Hull – on the Web	A−

In a review for AllMusic, Alex Henderson wrote: "there is no shortage of AACM influence on Morning Sun/Harvest Moon... But here's the thing that separates this 2010 recording from a lot of AACM-minded efforts: Bankhead and the other members of his cohesive acoustic sextet... occasionally detour into the sort of dense, clobbering, screaming free jazz that the AACM was a departure from... more often than not, this fine album is unapologetically avant-garde. It's great to see Bankhead finally getting a chance to record as a leader."

Writing for All About Jazz, Raul d'Gama Rose commented: "Bankhead is a composer with a sensibility finely attuned to a painterly impressionism, while being unafraid to fly in the face of convention, dappling his music with torrid references to avant-garde atonalism... Bankhead writes music that is erudite, intellectually challenging and well-rounded, with a sublime sense for the elements of song... He is also a sublime accompanist and the manner in which he urges horn men Ed Wilkerson and Mars Williams to wax eloquent... is remarkably reminiscent of Mingus."

Lyn Horton of Jazz Times stated: "Bankhead leaves no question about his capacity for translating his feelings into sound... It is easy for the group to vary its textures from the quiet to raucous; the melodic to abstract and to produce what is otherworldly both at the start and the finish."

In an article for Something Else!, S. Victor Aaron remarked: "Bankhead waited a long time before making his first record but evidently he knew just what to do... He made a record that pulled in the best elements of Pharoah Sanders, Art Ensemble of Chicago and Fred Anderson into a varying set of moods connected together by good ensemble instincts, otherworldliness and outstanding musicianship... Now that he's led his own date on a record that does nothing except showcase all that is great about AACM jazz, Bankhead has nothing left to prove."

Point of Departure's Ed Hazell wrote: "Bankhead may provide guidance and suggestions for the development of the improvisations, but more often than not, it's the collective decision making that determines the shape of the piece. He gives everyone in the band free rein to work together in spontaneous, organic ways. That might be the highest mark of his abilities as a leader."

Peter Margasak, writing for the Chicago Reader, called the recording "a damn good album," and stated: "Bankhead leads a sextet made up of players he’s worked with for years... and they flow between his original tunes and group improvisations with organic ease."

== Track listing ==
Track timings not provided.

1. "Morning Sun/Harvest Moon"
2. "Chicago Señorita"
3. "East Village"
4. "Over Under Inside Out"
5. "Red is the Color in Jean-Michel Basquiat's Silk Blue"
6. "22nd Street Hustle (In Memory Of Fred Anderson)"
7. "Flying Through Your Dreams"
8. "A Sketch of Leroy Jenkins"

== Personnel ==
- Harrison Bankhead – bass
- Mars Williams – alto saxophone, tenor saxophone, soprano saxophone, sopranino saxophone, clarinet, autoharp, flute
- Edward Wilkerson – tenor saxophone, clarinet, alto clarinet, didgeridoo
- James Sanders – violin
- Ernie Adams – percussion
- Avreeayl Ra – drums, percussion, wooden flute
