= Joe Ford (jazz musician) =

- Born: May 7, 1947; Buffalo, New York, U.S.
- Died: May 25, 2025 (aged 78)
- Genres: Jazz, big band
- Instruments: Saxophone

Joe Ford (May 7, 1947 – May 25, 2025) was an American jazz saxophonist.

== Background ==
Ford was born in Buffalo, New York. He studied saxophone under Makanda Ken McIntyre, Jackie McLean, and Frank Foster, and percussion under Joe Chambers. He earned his bachelor's degree in music education in 1968 from Central State University.

Ford died on May 25, 2025, at the age of 78.

== Career ==
After graduating from college, Ford taught in Buffalo Public Schools from 1968 to 1972. While working at the Buffalo Public Library in 1974 and 1975, Ford played in the Birthright Ensemble, then with McCoy Tyner in 1976. Since the early-1980s, he has worked extensively as a sideman, playing with Sam Jones, Lester Bowie, Jimmy Owens, Idris Muhammad, Abdullah Ibrahim, Chico O'Farrill, Saheb Sarbib (1984), Avery Sharpe (1988), Jerry Gonzalez (from 1988), Larry Willis (1989), Michael Logan (1990), Malachi Thompson (1991), John Blake (1992), Ronnie Burrage (1993), Hannibal Marvin Peterson (1993), Freddie Cole (1993), Steve Berrios (1995), and Nova Bossa Nova (1997).

In the late-1990s, Ford led two ensembles, the Black Art Sax Quartet and a big band group called The Thing. He has released one album as a leader, 1993's Today's Night on Blue Moon Records. It features Charles Fambrough, Kenny Kirkland and Jeff "Tain" Watts.

== Discography ==
=== As leader ===
- 1993: Today's Night

=== As sideman ===
With Nova Bossa Nova

- Jazz Influence (1997)

With Malachi Thompson

- The Jaz Life (Delmark, 1992)
- New Standards (Delmark, 1993)
- 47th Street (Delmark, 1997)
- Freebop Now! (Delmark, 1998)

With McCoy Tyner

- Focal Point (Milestone, 1976)
- Inner Voices (Milestone, 1977)
- The Greeting (Milestone, 1978)
- Horizon (Milestone, 1979)
- 13th House (Milestone, 1981)
- Uptown/Downtown (Milestone, 1988)
- The Turning Point (Birdology, 1992)
- Journey (Birdology, 1993)

With Larry Willis

- Heavy Blue (SteepleChase, 1990)
- Blue Fable (HighNote, 2007)
- I Fall In Love Too Easily (HighNote, 2020)
