= Anne Ward =

Anne or Ann Ward may refer to:

- Anne Ward (suffragist) (1825–1896), temperance leader and welfare worker in New Zealand
- Anne V. Ward (1877–1971), Scottish-born American educator
- Ann Ward (printer) (1715–1789), printer of The York Courant newspaper and The Life and Opinions of Tristram Shandy, Gentleman
- Ann E. Ward (c. 1949–2016), American jazz pianist
- Ann Ward (born 1991), American fashion model
- Ann Radcliffe (1764–1823), née Ward, English author
- Ann Hould-Ward (born 1954), American costume designer
