= Last Option =

Studio album by 8 Bold Souls
- Released: 2000
- Recorded: August 7 and 8, 1999
- Studio: Electrical Audio Recording, Chicago
- Genre: Jazz
- Length: 1:00:45
- Label: Thrill Jockey; 071
- Producer: 8 Bold Souls, Casey Rice

8 Bold Souls chronology
Ant Farm (1994)	Last Option (2000)

Last Option is the fourth album by the jazz group 8 Bold Souls. It was recorded in August 1999 in Chicago, and was released in 2000 by Thrill Jockey. The album features performances by saxophonist, clarinetist, and composer Edward Wilkerson, saxophonist Mwata Bowden, trumpeter Robert Griffin, Jr., trombonist Isaiah Jackson, tubist Gerald Powell, cellist Naomi Millender, bassist Harrison Bankhead, and drummer Dushun Mosley.

== Reception ==
Professional ratings
Review scores
Source	Rating
AllMusic	4.5/5 stars
The Penguin Guide to Jazz	4/4 stars
Spin	8/10 stars

In a review for AllMusic, Sean Westergaard called Last Option the group's "finest album to date," and commented: "the results are stellar... Wilkerson's compositions and arrangements are the true star of the show, with everyone in the band playing beautifully in service to the compositions... Every soloist is up to the task."

The Penguin Guide to Jazz said that "the ensemble's music is taking on an increasingly lived-in and confident feel... With Henry Threadghill's groups seemingly in abeyance at present, there's little else being made and played in this style... A marvellous feast of new jazz."

Mark Corroto, writing for All About Jazz, stated: "Wilkerson's writing never muddies or gets stuck in this sound because he can easily shift from New Orleans to uptown Ellington... The band favors odd time signatures to showcase its instruments and compositions. From a funeral dirge to the circus-like, the creative octet fourth recording is getting noticed by all the right listeners."

In an article for the Chicago Tribune, Bill Meyer wrote: "The disc captures the ensemble's carefully balanced blend of vivacious soloing and meticulous arrangements, which simultaneously evoke the long history of jazz and explore the novel textures created by juxtaposing the bowed strings of cellist Naomi Millender and double bassist Harrison Bankhead with a swaggering brass section."

In a review for Spin, D. Strauss remarked: "8 Bold Souls is very much in the AACM lineage of placing tradition in a taffy pull - stretching its sweetness and gathering a few gnats, too. Imagine Henry Threadgill leaving the ashram for an extended engagement at the 5 Spot, plus a David Murray-esque talent for turning an octet into a gentle army."

CMJ New Music Report's Ron Hart stated that the album "nimbly leaps over the wall that separates jazz music's traditional melodic obligations from its jones for the avant-garde with astounding skill and invention... Last Option... is an expansive freewheeling recording so varied in tempo and form that it almost sounds like an imaginary, late-night jam-session between Duke Ellington and Sun Ra... It's as if the group harnessed all of Chi-town's wind and set it free in wild bursts of beauty and madness."

Peter Margasak, writing for JazzTimes, commented: "Whereas earlier recordings sanded away most of the music's edges, here they remain sharp, revealing an urgency and spark missing on the others... As usual it's Wilkerson's superb compositions that make sense of that urgency, episodic gems that shape-shift invisibly... Each performance is marked by a telepathic ensemble sound, as the group-together for over 15 years with only three personnel changes-communicates on a super-human level."

== Track listing ==
All compositions by Edward Wilkerson.

1. "Odyssey" – 12:18
2. "Third One Smiles" – 8:03
3. "Last Option" – 7:57
4. "The Art of Tea" – 7:37
5. "Pachinko" – 6:50
6. "Gang of Four" – 9:17
7. "Brown Town" – 11:12

== Personnel ==
- Edward Wilkerson – alto saxophone, tenor saxophone, alto clarinet, clarinet
- Mwata Bowden – baritone saxophone, clarinet
- Robert Griffin, Jr. – trumpet, flugelhorn, piccolo trumpet
- Isaiah Jackson – trombone, percussion
- Gerald Powell – tuba
- Naomi Millender – cello
- Harrison Bankhead – bass
- Dushun Mosley – drums, percussion
