= Songs My Mother Loves =

Studio album by Dee Alexander
- Released: 2014
- Studio: Tone Zone Recording, Chicago, Illinois
- Genre: Jazz
- Length: 59:35
- Label: Blujazz; BJ3415

Dee Alexander chronology
Sketches of Light (2013)	Songs My Mother Loves (2014)	It's Too Hot For Words (2019)

Songs My Mother Loves is an album by Chicago-based jazz vocalist Dee Alexander. It was recorded at Tone Zone Recording in Chicago, Illinois, and was released in 2014 by the Blujazz label. On the album, Alexander is accompanied by a core group consisting of pianist Miguel Delacerna, double bassist Harrison Bankhead, and drummer Yuseff Ernie Adams, plus six guest artists: cellist Tomeka Reid, guitarist Scott Hesse, double bassist Junius Paul, saxophonists Ari Brown and Oliver Lake, and trumpeter Corey Wilkes.

The album pays tribute to the music her mother played around the house when Alexander was young. She reflected: "Every Sunday, my brothers and I would be awakened to the wonderful music my mother played while she did the ironing. I decided to do a tribute to her while I still have her."

== Reception ==
Professional ratings
Review scores
Source	Rating
All About Jazz	4.5/5 stars
Gina Loves Jazz	3/5 stars

In a review for All About Jazz, Dan Bilawsky wrote: "Alexander puts her own spin on classics and infrequently-performed winners that her mother enjoys, giving every single number a new lease on life... In her band mates, Alexander finds kindred spirits... While Dee Alexander is rightly viewed as a musical treasure in her hometown of Chicago, albums like this... should go a long way in expanding her reach. Her voice and talents can't be bound by any city, style or subject."

Christopher Loudon of JazzTimes called the album "nearly flawless," and described the players as "a stellar assortment of musicians." He commented: "Simply put, Songs My Mother Loves is a top contender for this year’s finest vocal release."

== Track listing ==
1. "As Long as You're Living" (Julian Priester, Tommy Turrentine) – 6:18
2. "Now or Never" (Billie Holiday, Curtis Reginald Lewis) – 6:41
3. "Guess Who I Saw Today" (Murray Grand, Elisse Boyd) – 4:53
4. "Perdido" (Juan Tizol, Ervin Drake, Hans Lengsfelder) – 4:20
5. "Lonesome Lover" (Max Roach, Abbey Lincoln) – 7:20
6. "Nature Boy" (eden ahbez) – 6:30
7. "Letter from Home" (Junior Mance, Orrin Keepnews) – 6:01
8. "What a Difference a Day Makes" (María Grever, Stanley Adams) – 4:48
9. "Softly, as in a Morning Sunrise" (Sigmund Romberg, Oscar Hammerstein II) – 3:59
10. "Soul Serenade" (Curtis Ousley, Luther Dixon) – 4:53
11. "Perdido" (Juan Tizol, Ervin Drake, Hans Lengsfelder) (alternate take) – 3:59

== Personnel ==
- Dee Alexander – vocals
- Miguel Delacerna – piano
- Harrison Bankhead – double bass
- Yuseff Ernie Adams – drums, percussion
- Tomeka Reid – cello (track 10)
- Scott Hesse – guitar (tracks 8, 9)
- Junius Paul – double bass (tracks 8, 10)
- Ari Brown – tenor saxophone (tracks 2, 7)
- Oliver Lake – alto saxophone (tracks 1, 5)
- Corey Wilkes – trumpet (track 6)
