= Horizon (McCoy Tyner album) =

Studio album by McCoy Tyner
- Released: 1980
- Recorded: April 24–25, 1979
- Studio: Van Gelder, Englewood Cliffs, NJ
- Genre: Jazz
- Length: 39:11 (original LP)
- Label: Milestone
- Producer: Orrin Keepnews

McCoy Tyner chronology
Together (1978)	Horizon (1980)	Quartets 4 X 4 (1980)

Horizon is an album by jazz pianist McCoy Tyner. It was released in 1979 on the Milestone label. It was recorded in April 1979 and features performances by Tyner with alto saxophonist Joe Ford, tenor saxophonist George Adams, violinist John Blake, bassist Charles Fambrough, drummer Al Foster and percussionist Guilherme Franco.

== Reception ==
Professional ratings
Review scores
Source	Rating
AllMusic	5/5 stars
The Rolling Stone Jazz Record Guide	3/5 stars

The San Francisco Examiner called the album "perhaps Tyner's most brilliant recording, from a technical standpoint."

The AllMusic review by Michael G. Nastos stated: "Tyner realizes a perfectly balanced, extroverted, compatible and utterly unique front line. It enables him to offer some of the most remarkable, memorable and powerful music of his career".

== Track listing ==
All compositions by McCoy Tyner except where noted

1. "Horizon" - 12:01
2. "Woman of Tomorrow" (Blake) - 7:41
3. "Motherland" (Blake) 7:17
4. "One for Honor" (Fambrough) - 4:29
5. "Just Feelin'" - 7:44
6. "Horizon" [alternate take] - 11:46 Bonus track on 2007 reissue

== Personnel ==
- McCoy Tyner – piano
- Joe Ford – alto saxophone (track 3), soprano saxophone (tracks 1, 5 & 6), flute (track 2)
- George Adams – tenor saxophone (tracks 1, 3, 5 & 6), flute (track 2)
- John Blake – violin (tracks 1–3, 5 & 6)
- Charles Fambrough – bass
- Al Foster – drums
- Guilherme Franco – congas (tracks 1–3, 5 & 6)
