= Entropy/Enthalpy =

2015 live album by The Turbine!

Live album by The Turbine! (Harrison Bankhead, Benjamin Duboc, Hamid Drake, Ramón López)
- Released: 2015
- Recorded: February 6–22, 2014
- Venue: France
- Genre: Jazz
- Length: 1:58:51
- Label: Rogueart; ROG-0058
- Producer: Michel Dorbon

Entropy/Enthalpy is a two-CD live album by the jazz ensemble The Turbine!, consisting of double bassists Harrison Bankhead and Benjamin Duboc, and drummers Hamid Drake and Ramón López. It was recorded during February 2014 at various locations in France during a tour that took place as part of a transatlantic exchange of musicians called The Bridge. While the first CD presents just the core group, three guest artists appear on the second CD: saxophonist Lionel Garcin, trumpeter Jean-Luc Cappozzo, and double bassist William Parker. The album was released in 2015 by the Rogueart label.

The group's name was proposed by López, who was "inspired by the thought that two basses and two drum kits would lead to perpetual motion and perpetual sound, much like an actual turbine." The track titles were taken from concepts in thermodynamics and physics.

== Reception ==
Professional ratings
Review scores
Source	Rating
All About Jazz	3.5/5 stars
The Free Jazz Collective	4/5 stars

In a review for The Free Jazz Collective, Eric McDowell wrote: "Given the members' pedigrees, as well as their chosen name (and punctuation!), we shouldn't be surprised to find that the music on Entropy/Enthalpy... is full of concentrated energy and power... Each track is credited to the entire group, reflecting a perfect union of parts... The effect is to subsume individual personalities under a common identity and allow listeners to sharpen their focus on the sounds themselves."

John Sharpe of All About Jazz stated that, of the two double bassists, Bankhead "typically signals melodic intent," while Duboc "majors on texture and timbre." He also noted that "Even though nothing is scripted, the Drake/Bankhead tandem ensures that links to the jazz tradition are never far away."

Writing for The New York City Jazz Record, Andrey Henkin suggested that the ensemble "wins the griffin-shaped award for oddest instrumental ensemble in recent memory," and commented: "Within the pieces there are trios, duos and solo segments, so that once a listener becomes accustomed to the timbral palette and appreciates the subtle change in dynamic flow... no frontline instrument seems lacking."

== Track listing ==
CD 1

1. "Rotor/Stator" – 8:49
2. "Thermodynamic Potential" – 7:50
3. "Electric Network" – 6:45
4. "Steaming" – 5:18
5. "Magnetic Induction" – 5:47
6. "Sparks in the Dark" – 9:30
7. "Natural Energy" – 7:20
8. "Compression/Depression" – 4:42

CD 2

1. "Electrical Coil" – 20:00
2. "Free Power" – 28:22
3. "Relief Valves" – 6:11
4. "500 Megawatts" – 8:13

== Personnel ==
The Turbine!

- Harrison Bankhead – double bass
- Benjamin Duboc – double bass
- Hamid Drake – drums, frame drum, vocals
- Ramon Lopez – drums, tabla, percussions

Guests

- Jean-Luc Cappozzo – trumpet (CD 2, track 1)
- Lionel Garcin – alto saxophone (CD 2, track 4)
- William Parker – double bass (CD 2, tracks 2–3)
