= Lift Every Voice (Malachi Thompson album) =

Studio album by Malachi Thompson
- Released: 1993
- Recorded: August 24 & 25, 1992
- Studio: Riverside, Chicago
- Genre: Jazz
- Length: 61:13
- Label: Delmark; DE-463
- Producer: Robert G. Koester

Malachi Thompson chronology
The Jaz Life (1992)	Lift Every Voice (1993)	New Standards (1993)

Lift Every Voice is an album by the American jazz trumpeter Malachi Thompson, released by the Delmark label in 1983.

== Reception ==
Professional ratings
Review scores
Source	Rating
AllMusic	4.5/5 stars
The Penguin Guide to Jazz Recordings	3/4 stars

AllMusic reviewer Ron Wynn stated, "Malachi Thompson merges hard bop, free, African rhythms, and gospel stylings on this release... Thompson deserves high praise not just for trying something different, but succeeding".

== Track listing ==
All compositions by Malachi Thompson except where noted

1. "Elephantine Island" – 3:44
2. "Old Man River" (Jerome Kern, Oscar Hammerstein II) – 12:18
3. "Tales of Ancient Kemet" – 7:49
4. "Transition" (John Coltrane) – 6:23
5. "Lift Ev'ry Voice and Sing" (James Weldon Johnson, John Rosamond Johnson) – 10:37
6. "Nubian Call" – 5:40
7. "The Trick of the Trip" – 4:13
8. "Nobody Knows the Trouble I've Seen" (Traditional) – 10:29

== Personnel ==
- Malachi Thompson – trumpet, conch, steer horn
- Bob Griffin, David Spencer, Elmer Brown, Kenny Anderson – trumpet
- Bill McFarland, Edwin Williams, Ray Ripperton – trombone
- Steve Berry – bass trombone
- Carter Jefferson – tenor saxophone
- Kirk Brown – piano
- Harrison Bankhead – bass
- Avreeayl Ra – drums
- Enoch, Richard Lawrence – percussion
- A.T. Crawford, Dee Dee McCall, James Spinks, Louise Thompson, Patsy Mullins, Rita Warford, Theo Reed, Valerie Mullins – vocals (track 5)
