= Quartets 4 X 4 =

Studio album by McCoy Tyner
- Released: 1980
- Recorded: March 3, 5–6 & May 29, 1980
- Studios: Van Gelder Studio, Englewood Cliffs, NJ
- Genres: Jazz, post-bop, modal jazz
- Length: 76:20
- Label: Milestone M 55007
- Producer: Orrin Keepnews

McCoy Tyner chronology
Horizon (1979)	Quartets 4 X 4 (1980)	13th House (1980)

Quartets 4 X 4 is a 1980 album by jazz pianist McCoy Tyner, released on the Milestone label. It was recorded in March and May 1980 by Tyner with bassist Cecil McBee and drummer Al Foster and featuring trumpeter Freddie Hubbard, guitarist John Abercrombie (here playing mandolin), vibraphonist Bobby Hutcherson and alto saxophonist Arthur Blythe, each for one side of the original double LP. The album was digitally remastered and first issued on a single CD in 1993.

== Reception ==
Professional ratings
Review scores
Source	Rating
AllMusic	4/5 stars
The Penguin Guide to Jazz Recordings	3/4 stars
The Rolling Stone Jazz Record Guide	2/5 stars

The AllMusic review by Scott Yanow states: "This collection is a fine all-around showcase for the brilliant pianist even if no new ground is broken". The authors of The Penguin Guide to Jazz are "pretty disappoint[ed], given the personnel. Everyone plays politely rather than with any pressing need to communicate anything, and as a result it's perhaps the meeting with Hutcherson [...] which comes off best".

== Track listing ==
1. "Inner Glimpse" - 6:18
2. "Manhã de Carnaval" (Luiz Bonfá, Antônio Maria) - 5:19
3. "Paradox" (Cecil McBee) - 6:51
4. "Backward Glance" (John Abercrombie) - 9:11
5. "Forbidden Land" - 10:39
6. "Pannonica" (Thelonious Monk) - 5:57
7. "I Wanna Stand over There" (Bobby Hutcherson) - 5:19
8. "The Seeker" - 7:38
9. "Blues in the Minor" - 8:05
10. "Stay as Sweet as You Are" (Harry Revel, Mack Gordon) - 4:36
11. "It's You or No One" (Jule Styne, Sammy Cahn) - 6:27

All compositions by McCoy Tyner except as indicated.

- Recorded at Van Gelder Studio, Englewood Cliffs, New Jersey, on March 3 (tracks 9–11), 5 (tracks 4–5) and 6 (tracks 6–8), and May 29 (tracks 1–3), 1980.

== Personnel ==
- McCoy Tyner - piano
- Cecil McBee - bass
- Al Foster - drums
- Freddie Hubbard - trumpet on "Inner Glimpse" and "Paradox" and flugelhorn on "Manhã de Carnaval"
- John Abercrombie - electric mandolin (tracks 4–5)
- Bobby Hutcherson - vibraphone (tracks 6–8)
- Arthur Blythe - alto saxophone (tracks 9–11)
