= La Leyenda de La Hora =

La Leyenda de la Hora

Studio album by McCoy Tyner
- Released: 1981
- Recorded: 1981
- Studio: Van Gelder Studio, Englewood Cliffs, NJ
- Genre: Jazz
- Length: 35:21
- Label: Columbia
- Producer: McCoy Tyner

McCoy Tyner chronology
13th House (1981)	La Leyenda de la Hora (1981)	Looking Out (1982)

Professional ratings
Review scores
Source	Rating
Allmusic	4/5 stars
The Rolling Stone Jazz Record Guide	3/5 stars

La Leyenda de la Hora (The Legend of the Hour) is a 1981 album by jazz pianist McCoy Tyner released on the Columbia label. It features performances by Tyner with alto saxophonist Paquito D'Rivera, tenor saxophonist Chico Freeman, trumpeter Marcus Belgrave, flautist Hubert Laws, vibraphonist Bobby Hutcherson, bassist Avery Sharpe, drummer Ignacio Berroa, and percussionist Daniel Ponce, plus a string section conducted by William Fischer.

== Reception ==
The AllMusic review by Scott Yanow states "The music (five Tyner originals) is highly rhythmic and generally quite stimulating. A strong effort."

== Track listing ==
All compositions by McCoy Tyner

1. "La Vida Feliz (The Happy Life)" - 7:29
2. "Ja'cara (A Serenade)" - 4:59
3. "La Habana Sol" - 6:36
4. "Walk Spirit, Talk Spirit" - 9:56
5. "La Busca (The Search)" - 6:21

== Personnel ==
- McCoy Tyner – piano
- Paquito D'Rivera – soprano saxophone, alto saxophone
- Chico Freeman – tenor saxophone
- Marcus Belgrave – trumpet, flugelhorn
- Hubert Laws – flute
- Bobby Hutcherson – vibraphone, marimba
- Avery Sharpe – acoustic bass
- Ignacio Berroa – drums
- Daniel Ponce – percussion
- Harold Kohan – violin
- John Blake – violin
- Karen Milne – violin
- Elliot Rosoff – violin
- Jesse Levine, Julien Barber – viola
- Kermit Moore – cello
- Jonathan Abramowitz – cello
- William Fischer – conductor
