= Freebop Now! =

Studio album by Malachi Thompson
- Released: 1998
- Recorded: April 21, 1993, February 22, 1998 and May 3, 1998
- Studio: Riverside, Chicago
- Genre: Jazz
- Length: 74:35
- Label: Delmark; DE-506
- Producer: Robert G. Koester, Steve Wagner, Malachi Thompson

Malachi Thompson chronology
47th Street (1998)	Freebop Now! (1998)	Rising Daystar (1999)

Freebop Now! (subtitled {20th Anniversary of the Freebop Band}) is an album by the American jazz trumpeter Malachi Thompson, released by the Delmark label in 1998.

== Reception ==
Professional ratings
Review scores
Source	Rating
AllMusic	3/5 stars
The Penguin Guide to Jazz Recordings	3/4 stars

AllMusic reviewer Don Snowden stated. "Freebop Now! is designed both as a manifesto for Malachi Thompson's aesthetic principles and a 20th anniversary celebration of his Freebop Band concept. But it's a rather disjointed disc jamming together two sextet sessions with different goals ... while that doesn't derail Freebop Now!, it's not the strongest disc in Thompson's consistently interesting catalog".

On All About Jazz Jack Bowers said, "Thompson states in his liner notes that Free-bop "takes the most exciting elements of bop and combines [them] with the exploratory aspects of avant-garde jazz," which seems a more accurate description of his band's purpose. Thus Free-bop strives to broaden the parameters of Jazz without abandoning the music's customary precepts of order and discipline. It is 'free' only in the sense that Thompson and his colleagues seek to rearrange the basic building blocks of bop and upraise them to a new and more exciting plane. In fact, the Free-bop Band sounds for the most part much like many other bop-based groups who try as best they can to communicate within the vernacular... Except for a few minor bumps in the road, this is high-caliber bop, Free or otherwise".

== Track listing ==
All compositions by Malachi Thompson except where noted

1. "Black Nile" (Wayne Shorter) – 6:13
2. "Goree Island" – 5:21
3. "Flight to Senegal" – 5:55
4. "Freebop Now!" – 5:31
5. "Just a Look" – 3:54
6. "'Round Midnight" (Thelonious Monk) – 4:39
7. "Cancerian Moon" – 6:36
8. "Jammin' at the Point" – 8:02
9. "Worm Hole" – 8:19
10. "Ancient African Horns" – 1:02
11. "Black Hole" – 2:57
12. "Heathens and Space/Time Projection" – 3:41
13. "Jammin' at the Point (Reprise)" – 2:25

== Personnel ==
- Malachi Thompson – trumpet, recitation
- Steve Berry – trombone
- Oliver Lake – alto saxophone (tracks 5, 8, 9 & 11–13)
- Joe Ford – soprano saxophone (track 7)
- Billy Harper (tracks 1–4, 6 & 10), Carter Jefferson (track 7), Sonny Seals (track 3) – tenor saxophone
- Kirk Brown – piano
- Harrison Bankhead (tracks 5, 8, 9 & 11–13), James Cammack (tracks 1–4, 6 & 10), John Whitfield (track 7) – bass
- Nasar Abedey (track 7), Dana Hall (tracks 1–6 & 8–13), Richard "Drahseer" Smith (track 6) – drums
- Hamid Drake (tracks 8 & 13), Tony Carpenter – percussion (track 7)
- Amiri Baraka (track 12), Sharese Locke (track 11) – recitation
- Mae Koen (track 3), Larry Smith (track 12) – voice
