= Rising Daystar =

Studio album by Malachi Thompson
- Released: October 26, 1999
- Recorded: May 3, 1998 – June 7, 1999
- Studio: Riverside, Chicago
- Genre: Jazz
- Length: 64:22
- Label: Delmark; DE-518
- Producer: Robert G. Koester, Steve Wagner, Malachi Thompson

Malachi Thompson chronology
Freebop Now! (1999)	Rising Daystar (1999)	Talking Horns (2001)

Rising Daystar is an album by the American jazz trumpeter Malachi Thompson, released by the Delmark label in 1999.

== Reception ==
Professional ratings
Review scores
Source	Rating
AllMusic	4/5 stars
The Penguin Guide to Jazz Recordings	3/4 stars

AllMusic reviewer Alex Henderson stated: "When Malachi Thompson calls his music 'free bop,' it isn't empty rhetoric; he really does take a free, open-minded approach to bop, and he savors 'the tradition' without being enslaved by it. Recorded at three separate sessions in 1997, 1998, and 1999, Rising Daystar is primarily a hard bop/post-bop CD... But while Rising Daystar is more inside than outside ... the Chicagoan isn't limited to that approach ... he detours into the avant garde and savors the pleasures of dissonant outside improvisation". In JazzTimes, Tom Terrell observed: "Feeling their collective hard bopping, free jazzing, Afro-head swinging inner child, Malachi and Freebop get all the way open".

== Track listing ==
All Compositions BY Malachi Thompson except where noted

1. "Rising Daystar" – 8:01
2. "Mansa" – 10:46
3. "Busy Little Fingers" – 4:17
4. "Nefertiti" (Wayne Shorter) – 7:52
5. "Surrender Your Love" – 4:48
6. "Fanfare for Trane" – 12:25
7. "Song for Morgan" – 10:15
8. "Circles in the Air (Dedicated to Fred Hopkins)" – 5:36

== Personnel ==
- Malachi Thompson – trumpet
- Gary Bartz – alto saxophone, soprano saxophone (tracks 1–7)
- Sonny Seals – tenor saxophone (track 5)
- Kirk Brown – piano (tracks 1–7)
- James Cammack (track 5), Harrison Bankhead (tracks 1 & 3–5), Fred Hopkins (track 8), John Whitfield (tracks 2, 6 & 7) – bass
- Nasar Abedey (tracks 1, 3 & 4), Dana Hall (tracks 5 & 8) – drums
- Tony Carpenter – percussion (tracks 2 & 5–7)
- Dee Alexander – vocals (track 5)
