= Samuel "Savoirfaire" Williams =

American jazz musician

Samuel "Savoirfaire" Williams is a classically-trained, American jazz violinist from Chicago.

== Biography ==
At the age of three, he began playing violin at his parents' church. Two years later, Samuel joined a group of child prodigies under the tutelage of Suzuki Violin instructor, Betty Haag. His first performance was at Chicago's Orchestra Hall during a public television broadcast which became an annual event spanning more than 35 years. Samuel performed with this group for five of those years.

He attended the Merit School of Music in Chicago, and studied music theory while participating in youth orchestras including the City Youth Symphony, Chicago Youth Symphony Orchestra, Protégé, All-City and All-State. Afro-Panamanian musician Joseph Williams gave him private violin instruction when he was 16. During this time, musician and conductor Frank Winkler invited him to play lead for the City Youth String Ensemble's viola section. The following year, Samuel earned a scholarship to study Classical viola under the guidance of Edward Adelson during summer camp (formerly the National Music Camp) at Interlochen Center for the Arts in Michigan. At Interlochen, Samuel sat in with Milt Jackson (Modern Jazz Quartet) at a workshop.

While working at the Chicago Symphony Center, Samuel met and performed for Wynton Marsalis who suggested he study with Jazz violin legend, Johnny Frigo. Though Mr. Frigo was not interested in teaching, he allowed Samuel to sit in with him at local performances. Eventually, Samuel studied Classical violin with violinist and composer Harold Geller and Richard Ferrin, principal violist for the Chicago Symphony Orchestra. As many independent artists do, Samuel "busked" (performed in public places for gratuities) on the streets to pay for violin lessons. During one of his street performances, Jazz guitar great Kenny Burrell observed his skill and invited Samuel to collaborate with himself, Willie Pickens and Larry Gray on a Bebop performance at Chicago's Jazz Showcase.

In 2000, Samuel was voted into the Chicago Chapter of the Association for the Advancement of Creative Musicians (AACM), which earned him the moniker “Savoirfaire.” That same year, Samuel began an apprenticeship with luthier Martin Sheridan to learn the art of violin-making. He later became the owner of the violin shop and managed it for three years.

After releasing three live albums on his own, Bob Koester discovered his work and in 2004, Delmark Records produced the internationally acclaimed release “Running Out of Time." Over the years, Savoirfaire has been invited to record with a plethora of artists in various genres and at international Jazz festivals - most notably as a session string player for Otis Clay and R. Kelly.

Samuel was tapped to play principal violinist with his quartet, Renascent String Quartet, as extras in the 2005 feature film Proof starring Gwyneth Paltrow and Anthony Hopkins. Through his indie label, Central Coast Entertainment Group, Inc. he released "This Just In" in 2011 and a pop electronic instrumental album entitled "Threads" in 2012.

In 2015, Samuel founded the Chicago Gypsy Project (a trio with Dave Miller on guitar and Charlie Kirchen on bass), which produced the most recent independent release, "We Swing." He continues to perform with his group Savoirfaire Jazz Quartet as well as busking on the streets, and in various venues throughout Chicago.

== Discography ==
- SavoirFaire Debut (2000)
- In the Moment (2001)
- Vision Quest (2001)
- Afrika Rising (2002)
- Baddigo (2002)
- The Only Other Option (2002)
- Ancient to Future (2003)
- Live at the Velvet Lounge (2003)
- Heat (2003)
- Live at the Shark Bar (2004)
- Running Out Of Time (2005)
- Huazzteo (2005)
- This Just In (2007)
- Threads (2011)
- Simple Classical Melodies (2012)
- We Swing (2015)
