= Dee Alexander =

American jazz singer

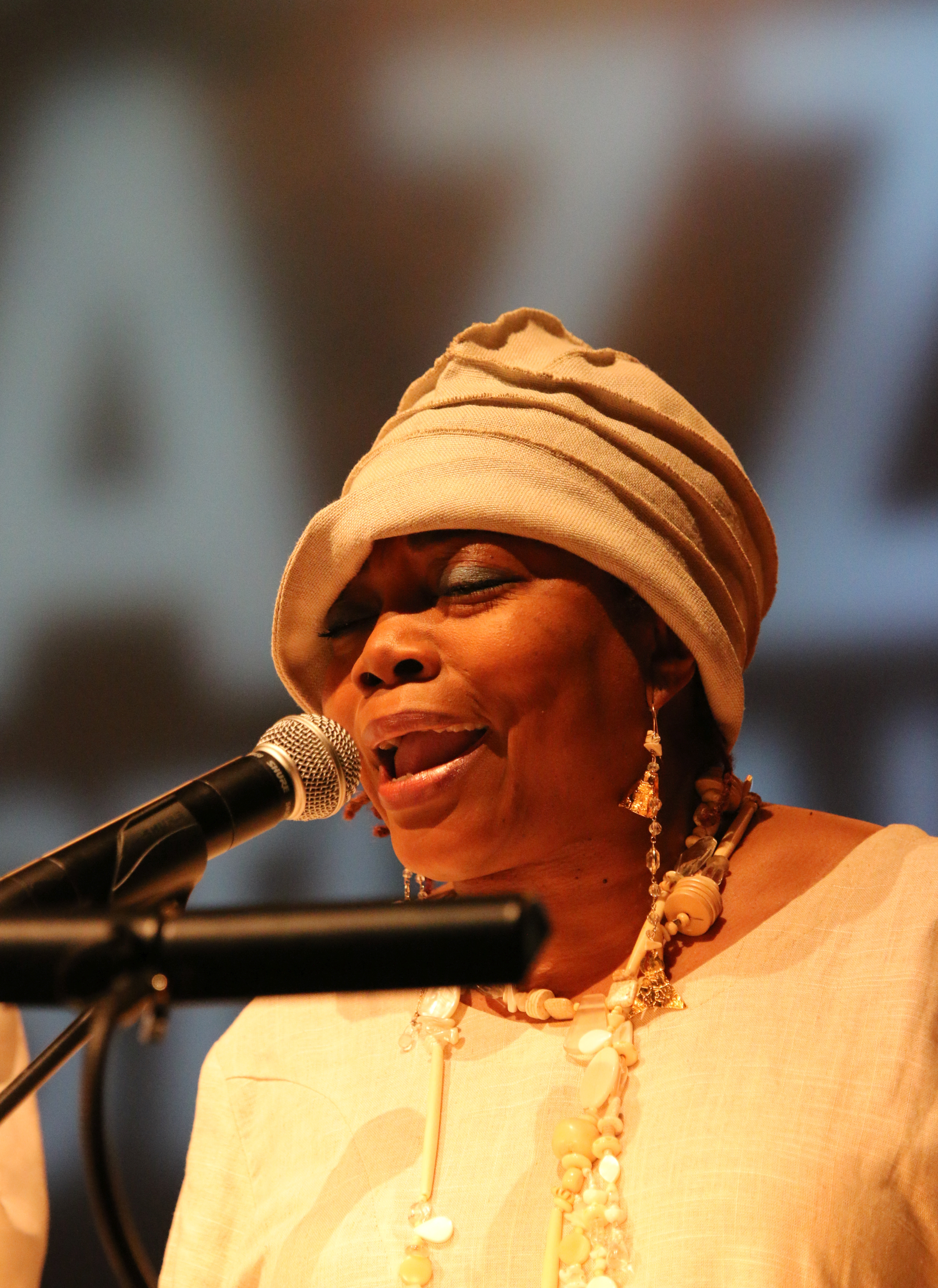
Alexander in 2015

Deleatrice "Dee" Alexander (born 1956 or 1957) is an American jazz singer. She is a member of the AACM and appeared at the Newport Jazz Festival in 2013.

Alexander is the host of Sunday Jazz with Dee Alexander, a syndicated radio show on the WFMT Radio Network's Jazz Network.

In 2026 she was named Jazz Legacies Fellow by the Mellon Foundation

== Discography ==
As leader or co-leader

- Wild Is the Wind (Blujazz, 2009)
- Sketches of Light (EGEA-UJ, 2012)
- Songs My Mother Loves (Blujazz, 2014)
- It's Too Hot For Words (Delmark, 2019) with the Metropolitan Jazz Octet

With the Chicago Soul Jazz Collective

- On the Way to be Free (JF Music, 2022)

With Isaiah Collier & The Chosen Few

- The Almighty (Division 81 Records, 2024)

With Emma Dayhuff

- Innovations & Lineage The Chicago Project (Division 81 Records, 2025)

With Ernest Dawkins

- Misconception of a Delusion Shades of a Charade (Dawk, 2005)
- Memory in the Center (Dawk Music, 2014)
- New Horizons Redux: 12-13-14-25-46: 45 Years of Great Black Music (Live the Spirit Residency)

With Hamid Drake and Bindu

- Blissful (RogueArt, 2008)

With Douglas Ewart

- Velvet Fire: Dedicated to Baba Fred Anderson (Aarawak, 2009)

With Ramsey Lewis

- Urban Knights VII (Ropeadope, 2019)

With R. Kelly

- Happy People/U Saved Me (Jive, 2004)

With Malachi Thompson

- 47th Street (Delmark, 1997)
- Rising Daystar (Delmark, 1999)
- Blue Jazz (Delmark, 2003) with Gary Bartz and Billy Harper
