= Association for the Advancement of Creative Musicians =

American nonprofit organization

- Abbreviation: AACM
- Predecessor: Experimental Band
- Formation: May 1965
- Founder: Muhal Richard Abrams; Jodie Christian; Steve McCall; Phil Cohran
- Type: Non-profit organization
- Purpose: Support and encourage jazz performers, composers and educators
- Location: Chicago, Illinois
- Region served: U.S.
- Official language: English
- Key people: Henry Threadgill; Anthony Braxton; Roscoe Mitchell
- Affiliations: Black Artists Group
- Endowment: MacArthur Foundation
- Website: aacmchicago.org

The Association for the Advancement of Creative Musicians (AACM) is an American nonprofit organization, founded in 1965 in Chicago by pianist Muhal Richard Abrams, pianist Jodie Christian, drummer Steve McCall, and composer Phil Cohran. The AACM is devoted "to nurturing, performing, and recording serious, original music," according to its charter. It supports and encourages jazz performers, composers and educators. Although founded in the jazz tradition, the group's outreach and influence has, according to Larry Blumenfeld, "touched nearly all corners of modern music." Per the AACM, it "pays homage to the diverse styles of expression within the body of Black Music in the USA, Africa and throughout the world."

== Background ==
By the 1960s, jazz music was losing ground to rock music, and the founders of the AACM felt that a proactive group of musicians would add creativity and outlet for new music. The AACM was formed in May 1965 by a group of African-American musicians in Chicago centered on pianist Muhal Richard Abrams, who had organized the Experimental Band since 1961. The musicians were generally steadfast in their commitment to their music, despite a lack of performance venues and sometimes indifferent audiences. From 1969 the AACM organised a music education program for inner-city youths. In the 1960s and 1970s AACM members were among the most important and innovative in all of jazz, though the AACM's contemporary influence has waned some in recent years. Many AACM members have recorded widely: in the early days on the Delmark Records Avant Garde Jazz series and later on the Black Saint/Soul Note and India Navigation labels, and to a lesser extent on the Arista Records and ECM labels.

The musical endeavors of members of the AACM often include an adventurous mixing of avant-garde jazz, classical, and world music. The AACM also ran a school, The AACM School of Music, with classes in all areas taught by members of the AACM. The AACM also had a strong relationship with an influential sister organization, the Black Artists Group (BAG) of St. Louis, Missouri. The AACM has received aid from the MacArthur Foundation and has a strong relationship with Columbia College. A Power Stronger Than Itself: The AACM and American Experimental Music by AACM member George E. Lewis, which documents the AACM's history, has been published by the University of Chicago Press (May 2008).

In 2015, a 50-year retrospective exhibition of art, music and group-related artifacts, entitled, "Free at First", was held at the DuSable Museum of African American History.

== Music ==
The AACM has been on the forefront of the avant-garde since its inception in 1965. Anthony Braxton, Henry Threadgill, and the Art Ensemble of Chicago pushed the boundaries of jazz and challenged the avant-garde classical movement led by John Cage. Concerts were heavily improvised, and many AACM members created scores that blended music, geometry, painting, and ciphers to be interpreted by the performers live. The AACM was part of an artistic movement on the South Side of Chicago that included AFRICobra (African Commune of Bad Relevant Artists) and other collectives. In the third decade of the 21st century, AACM members continue to produce vibrant avant-garde jazz and jazz-influenced music in Chicago and elsewhere.

== Members ==
(some deceased; largely complete through at least early 2026)

- Muhal Richard Abrams
- Peggy Abrams
- Soji Adebayo
- Willel Afi-Fi
- Ajaramu Joseph Shelton
- Dee Alexander
- Martin Alexander
- Leon Q. Allen
- Frederick "Fred" Anderson
- JoVia Armstrong
- Khari B
- Harrison Bankhead
- Renee Baker
- Zahra Glenda Baker
- Thurman Barker
- Yosef Ben Israel
- Fredrick "Fred" Berry
- Stephen E. "Steve" Berry
- Felix Blackmon
- Mwata Bowden
- Byron Bowie
- Lester Bowie
- David Boykin
- Joel Brandon
- Anthony Braxton
- William "Billy" Brimfield
- Ari Brown
- Arthur "Art Turk" Burton
- Ken Chaney
- Jodie Christian
- Charles Clark
- Chet
- Charles Wes Cochran
- Phil Kelan Cohran
- Isaiah Collier
- Adegoke Steve Colson
- Iqua Colson
- Pete Cosey
- Gordon Emmanuel Cranshaw
- Jerome Croswell
- Michael Danzy
- Edwin Daugherty
- Rahmlee Michael Davis
- Vincent Davis
- Ernest Khabeer Dawkins
- Kalapurasha Ahrah Difdah/Maurice McIntyre
- Justin Dillard
- Eugene "Gene" Dinwiddie
- Drahseer Khalid
- Sura Ramses Dupart
- Eugene Easton
- Jimmy Ellis
- Coco Elysses
- Kahil El'Zabar
- Douglas R. Ewart
- Malachi Favors Maghostut
- Alvin Fielder
- Benjamin Ford
- Earl "Chico" Freeman
- Christopher Gaddy
- T. Steven Galloway
- Sarnie Garrett
- Ben LaMar Gay
- Aaron Getsug
- Frank Gordon
- Aquilla Graves
- Robert L. Griffin
- Jeff Harris
- Vandy Harris
- Walter Henderson
- Tony Herrera
- Frederic J. "Fred" Hopkins
- Edward "Ed" House
- Billy Howell
- Light Henry Huff
- "Maia The Artiste" Sonjia Hupert Harper
- Frederick "Fred" Jackson, Jr.
- Isaiah "Ike" Jackson
- John Shenoy Jackson
- Shaku Joseph Jarman
- Leroy Jenkins
- James Johnson
- Shaun Johnson
- Leonard E. Jones
- Edward "Kidd" Jordan
- Buford Kirkwood
- Janis Lane-Ewart
- Lester Lashley
- Sandra Lashley
- Khari Lemuel
- George E. Lewis
- Alex Lombre
- Evod Magek
- Steven "Steve" McCall, IV
- Wallace Laroy McMillan
- Nicole "Niki" Mitchell
- Roscoe Mitchell
- Bernard Mixon
- Donovan Mixon
- Dushun Mosley
- Famadou Don Moye
- Ameen Muhammed
- Amina Claudine Myers
- Mankwe Ndosi
- Reggie Nicholson
- Eddie "Gip" Noble, Jr.
- Seitu "Rah Bird" Nurullah
- Shanta Nurullah
- Ugochi Nwaogwugwu
- Norman Palm
- Jeff Parker
- Junius Paul
- Regina Perkins
- John Powell
- Carlos Pride
- Amen Ra
- Avreeayl Ra
- Michael "Mike" Reed
- Tomeka Reid
- Matana Roberts
- Troy Robinson
- Bata Rutlin
- Sherry Scott
- Davu Seru
- Sar Abshalom Ben Sholamo
- Rasul Siddik/Sadik
- Wadada Leo Smith
- Isaiah Spencer
- John Stubblefield
- Hanah Jon Taylor
- Malachi Thompson
- Henry Threadgill
- Umchaka Uba
- Frank Walton
- Ann E. Ward
- Greg Ward
- Rita Warford
- Jesus Wayne
- Edward Wilkerson, Jr.
- Corey Wilkes
- Jose Williams
- Samuel "Savoirfaire" Williams
- Reggie Willis
- Jonathan Woods
- avery r. young
- Adam Zanolini
- Sabu Zawadi
- Saalik Ahmad Ziyad
- Taalib-Din Ziyad
