= Blue Jazz =

2003 studio album by Malachi Thompson

Studio album by Malachi Thompson and Africa Brass featuring Gary Bartz and Billy Harper
- Released: October 21, 2003
- Recorded: February 27 & 28, 2003
- Studio: Riverside, Chicago
- Genre: Jazz
- Length: 68:23
- Label: Delmark; DE-548
- Producer: Robert G. Koester

Malachi Thompson chronology
Talking Horns (2001)	Blue Jazz (2003)

Blue Jazz is the final studio album by the American jazz trumpeter Malachi Thompson, released by the Delmark label in 2003.

== Reception ==
Professional ratings
Review scores
Source	Rating
AllMusic	4.5/5 stars
The Penguin Guide to Jazz Recordings	3.5/4 stars

AllMusic reviewer Thom Jurek stated, "Trumpeter, composer, arranger, and bandleader Malachi Thompson has outdone himself with Blue Jazz ... Thompson and his notion of reinventing the manner in which a brass-driven big band explores the relationships between harmony and rhythm, and the more tenacious linguistic commonalities between bebop and free jazz have never been as articulately or gracefully rendered as they are in this pair of suites. The band is stellar... The two suites, "Black Metropolis" and "Blues for a Saint Called Louis," are stunning compositions in and of themselves... The spirit is raucous, joyous, and utterly sophisticated; it looks forward and back across 20 years of Thompson's own free bop amalgam, but also through the entirety of jazz history. The album is, simply put, a singular achievement and one of the great big band records in recent years, and a serious candidate for big band album of 2003". In JazzTimes John Litweiler observed, "Trumpeter Thompson solos at length throughout Blue Jazz. He’s a fanciful player, a master of the lyrical side of ’50s late-bop players... But he cares less about hard bop’s flair and great formal sophistication-instead, his lines are diffuse, so inspired passages often jostle uninspired ideas... There’s pleasure in Thompson’s soulful compositions and arrangements. Like his friend Lester Bowie, he presents a variety of settings for his five trumpets and four trombones, with plenty of blues and backbeats".

== Track listing ==
All compositions by Malachi Thompson except where noted

1. "Black Metropolis" – 9:10
2. "The Panther" – 6:48
3. "Jaaz Revelations" – 5:33
4. "Genesis / Rebirth" – 10:35
5. "Po' Little Louie" – 3:41
6. "Get on the Train" – 4:12
7. "Blues for a Saint Called Louis" – 5:48
8. "Blue Jazz" – 8:28
9. "Footprints" (Wayne Shorter) – 9:12
10. "Mud Hole" – 4:29

== Personnel ==
- Malachi Thompson – trumpet, flugelhorn
- Gary Bartz – alto saxophone, soprano saxophone
- Billy Harper – tenor saxophone
- David Spencer, Kenny Anderson, Micah Frazier, Elmer Brown – trumpet
- Tracy Kirk, Steve Berry, Bill McFarland, Omar Jefferson – trombone
- Kirk Brown – piano
- Harrison Bankhead – bass
- Leon Joyce Jr. – drums
- Ari Brown – tenor saxophone, clarinet (tracks 4 & 7)
- Gene "Daddy G" Barge – tenor saxophone (track 10)
- Dee Alexander (tracks 5, 7 & 8), The Big DooWopper (track 10) – vocals
