= Spirit (Malachi Thompson album) =

Studio album by Malachi Thompson
- Released: 1983
- Recorded: 1983
- Studio: Glasswing
- Genre: Jazz
- Length: 46:38
- Label: Delmark; DS-442
- Producer: Robert G. Koester

Malachi Thompson chronology
The Seventh Son (1980)	Spirit (1983)	The Jaz Life (1992)

Spirit is an album by the American jazz trumpeter Malachi Thompson, released by the Delmark label in 1983.

== Reception ==
Professional ratings
Review scores
Source	Rating
AllMusic	4/5 stars
The Penguin Guide to Jazz Recordings	3/4 stars

AllMusic reviewer Scott Yanow stated: "This is a varied advanced jazz set by trumpeter Malachi Thompson ... the strong band plays five originals that cover a lot of different moods ... Worth exploring".

== Track listing ==
All compositions by Malachi Thompson, except where indicated.

1. "Spirit of Man" – 6:49
2. "Back to the One" – 7:07
3. "A Rising Daystar" – 7:07
4. "Dhyia Malika" – 8:27
5. "I Remember Clifford" (Benny Golson) – 7:53
6. "Dearly Beloved" (John Coltrane) – 4:45 Additional track on CD reissue
7. "No More Hard Times" – 4:30

== Personnel ==
- Malachi Thompson – trumpet
- Carter Jefferson – tenor saxophone
- Albert Dailey – piano
- James King – bass
- Nasar Abadey – drums
- Randy Abbott – congas
- Arnae Burton (track 2), Leon Thomas (track 7) – vocals
