= The Jaz Life =

Studio album by Malachi Thompson
- Released: 1992
- Recorded: June 30, 1991
- Studio: P.S., Chicago, Illinois
- Genre: Jazz
- Length: 48:33
- Label: Delmark; DD-453
- Producer: Robert G. Koester

Malachi Thompson chronology
Spirit (1983)	The Jaz Life (1992)	Lift Every Voice (1993)

The Jaz Life is an album by the American jazz trumpeter Malachi Thompson, recorded in 1991 and released by the Delmark label the following year. "Mystic Trumpet Man" is a tribute to Miles Davis.

== Reception ==
Professional ratings
Review scores
Source	Rating
AllMusic	4/5 stars
The Penguin Guide to Jazz Recordings	3/4 stars

The Chicago Tribune called the album "spirited and bluesy," writing that Thompson "is a real talent."

AllMusic reviewer Michael G. Nastos stated that "these six compositions are not only life-affirming, but acknowledgments to such important icons as John Coltrane, Art Blakey, Miles Davis, and some of their important sidemen, who have inspired Thompson during his struggle with a rare lymphomatic cancer ... Thompson really hits the note consistently with this band of modern mainstream jazz masters performing at their best. Recommended."

== Track listing ==
All compositions by Malachi Thompson except where noted

1. "In Walked John" – 7:08
2. "My Romance" (Richard Rodgers, Lorenz Hart) – 9:23
3. "Drown in My Own Tears" (Henry Glover) – 7:27
4. "Mystic Trumpet Man" – 5:49
5. "Croquet Ballet" (Billy Harper) – 6:39
6. "Lucky Seven" – 12:07

== Personnel ==
- Malachi Thompson – trumpet
- Joe Ford – alto saxophone, soprano saxophone
- Carter Jefferson – tenor saxophone
- Kirk Brown – piano
- Harrison Bankhead – bass
- Nasar Abadey – drums
- Richard Lawrence – congas
