= Frequency (Frequency album) =

2006 studio album by American jazz group

Studio album by Frequency (Edward Wilkerson, Nicole Mitchell, Harrison Bankhead, and Avreeayl Ra)
- Released: 2006
- Studio: Riverside Studio, Chicago
- Genre: Free jazz
- Length: 1:09:57
- Label: Thrill Jockey; THRILL 164

Frequency is the debut album by Chicago-based collective jazz quartet Frequency, featuring saxophonist Edward Wilkerson, flutist Nicole Mitchell, bassist Harrison Bankhead, and percussionist Avreeayl Ra. It was recorded at Riverside Studio in Chicago, and was released in 2006 by Thrill Jockey. The album includes compositions by all four musicians, along with group improvisations.

== Reception ==
Professional ratings
Review scores
Source	Rating
AllMusic	4/5 stars
All About Jazz	5/5 stars

In a review for AllMusic, Sean Westergaard wrote: "Frequency... draws from the well of 'Spiritual Jazz' that informed so many great Impulse recordings, but with an AACM sensibility.... There are some stunning flute and clarinet solos, and the way Mitchell and Wilkerson's lines intertwine at times is nothing short of sublime. Bankhead's bass playing is intuitive and supportive... Avreeayl Ra is an extremely attentive drummer, able to push the music in an Elvin Jones/Rashied Ali style or play melodic lines on the kit... Frequency is an excellent debut and demonstrates once again that Chicago's jazz talent is second to none."

Writing for All About Jazz, Troy Collins commented: "Frequency is a rare beast: a supergroup that actually lives up to its billing. Drawing equally from individual strengths without holding back inspiration, no matter how far out, this is a winning document of the finest creative jazz Chicago has to offer."

The Chicago Reader's Peter Margasak stated: "The flute's soft timbre often leads to ruminative, spacious exercises... These players have worked together for years, and you can hear it in the relaxed, stunningly empathetic performances."

In an article for Alarm Magazine, Jason Verhagen remarked: "Frequency's music is a delightful mix of free jazz with nods to traditional African modes... just by looking at the group's album cover art and listening through the record, a listener can tell that Frequency is very in tune with nature. Whether it's the hot plains of Africa or the concrete jungles of Chicago, Frequency composes the perfect backdrop to each."

Regarding Mitchell's contribution to the album, Michael J. West of Jazz Times wrote: "The many woodwinds of frontline partner and de facto leader Edward Wilkerson might have overwhelmed a lesser musician, but Mitchell's is the most penetrating, distinctive sound on this quartet disc.... this is some of the flutist's best playing on record. She even manages to find ingenuity in the rustling of a plastic bag."

Matthew Grigg of The Free Jazz Collective commented: "Moving through soulful grooves to heated free blowing," the musicians "all double on a variety of instruments which ensures a rich sonic palette, and inevitably gives rise to Art Ensemble comparisons. However, at their most cohesive they present a meditative and spiritual approach not dissimilar in intent to the early 70's work of Alice Coltrane and Pharoah Sanders."

== Track listing ==
1. "Pitiful James" (Edward Wilkerson) – 5:23
2. "Take Refuge" (Nicole Mitchell) – 4:49
3. "Satya" (Avreeayl Ra) – 18:47
4. "Portrait of Light" (Harrison Bankhead) – 5:22
5. "Fertility Dance" (Frequency) – 8:25
6. "From the Other Side" (Frequency) – 10:36
7. "The Tortoise" (Nicole Mitchell) – 4:35
8. "Optimystic" (Frequency) – 6:07
9. "Serenity" (Frequency) – 5:53

== Personnel ==
- Edward Wilkerson – tenor saxophone, clarinet, flute, bells
- Nicole Mitchell – flute, alto flute, bass flute, piccolo, melodica, harp, vocals, plastic bag
- Harrison Bankhead – double bass, cello, flute, bells
- Avreeayl Ra – percussion, kalimba, flute, vocals
