= Talking Horns =

Studio album by Malachi Thompson with Hamiet Bluiett and Oliver Lake
- Released: August 14, 2001
- Recorded: March 2–4, 1999
- Studio: Riverside, Chicago
- Genre: Jazz
- Length: 63:35
- Label: Delmark; DE-532
- Producer: Robert G. Koester, Malachi Thompson

Malachi Thompson chronology
Rising Daystar (1999)	Talking Horns (2001)	Blue Jazz (2003)

Talking Horns is an album by the American jazz trumpeter Malachi Thompson, released by the Delmark label in 2001.

== Reception ==
Professional ratings
Review scores
Source	Rating
AllMusic	4/5 stars
The Penguin Guide to Jazz Recordings	3/4 stars

AllMusic reviewer Alex Henderson stated that "the improvisers favor an inside/outside approach and divide their time between hard swinging post-bop and more abstract, AACM-minded avant-garde jazz. ... Thompson, true to form, insists on keeping his options open -- the trumpeter sees no reason why he cannot be influenced by Freddie Hubbard one minute and Lester Bowie the next. As a result, Talking Horns is unpredictable -- you never know from one track to the next if the sextet will go in a straight-ahead post-bop direction or an AACM-influenced avant-garde direction. But whatever direction the sextet chooses, this album is consistently strong and serves as a fine example of Midwestern acoustic jazz".

In JazzTimes Aaron Steinberg wrote, "Talking Horns isn’t really a recording of manifesto-fueled excitement or much of a departure for the trumpeter, however. Thompson’s outfit reinvestigates familiar territory-robust hard-bop edged with squeally outbursts-with moderation and restraint. On the mostly vamp or groove-based tunes, the rhythm section ticks off measures without any real sense of urgency. Even free-blown passages come across as a little tame. Thompson himself plays with a big, brassy sound but turns in able if not particularly memorable solos".

All About Jazz said, "On his latest Delmark release, trumpeter Malachi Thompson has as a not-so-ulterior motive illustrating that jazz, in its free manifestation, continues as a vibrant creative medium. He and World Saxophone Quartet alumni, Oliver Lake and Hamiet Bluiett, acquit themselves famously in this endeavor and offer a tasty plate of avant-garde music ... Talking Horns captures the essence of jazz that the best albums do: heavy, fat groovin’ that sways the body combined with incisive, intelligent improvisation that excites the mind". Mark Corroto was less impressed, noting, "The good news is trumpeter Malachi Thompson mixes multiple styles and approaches on his latest release. But that is also the bad news. Thompson packs a wealth of music into his discs... Thompson’s eclecticism informs us of jazz history, but that also distracts from a singular message... His tendency to display multiple directions leaves the whole less than the sum of the musical parts".

== Track listing ==
All compositions by Malachi Thompson except where noted

1. "Woody's Dream" – 6:24
2. "Brass and Oak" (Oliver Lake) – 7:45
3. "Scope" (Lake) – 4:45
4. "Way Back When We Didn't Understand" (Hamiet Bluiett) – 5:10
5. "Fred Hopkins" (Bluiett) – 8:44
6. "Talking Horns" – 8:06
7. "Lucky Seven" – 11:40
8. "Circles in the Air" – 10:40

== Personnel ==
- Malachi Thompson – trumpet
- Oliver Lake – alto saxophone
- Hamiet Bluiett – baritone saxophone, contrabass clarinet
- Willie Pickens – piano
- Harrison Bankhead – bass
- Reggie Nicholson – drums
