= 47th Street (album) =

Studio album by Malachi Thompson
- Released: February 10, 1998
- Recorded: April 20, 1993 – September 14, 1996
- Studio: Riverside, Chicago
- Genre: Jazz
- Length: 70:43
- Label: Delmark; DD-497
- Producer: Robert G. Koester, Steve Wagner

Malachi Thompson chronology
Buddy Bolden's Rag (1993)	47th Street (1998)	Freebop Now! (1998)

47th Street is an album by the American jazz trumpeter Malachi Thompson, released by the Delmark label in 1998. The album formed part of Thompson's efforts to revitalize the Sutherland Hotel one of the last remaining links to the 47th Street Jazz Scene in Chicago.

== Reception ==
Professional ratings
Review scores
Source	Rating
AllMusic	4/5 stars
The Penguin Guide to Jazz Recordings	3/4 stars

AllMusic reviewer Tim Sheridan stated that "Thompson's terrific ode to a unique time and place in African-American history is filled with exciting musical ideas while also remaining accessible". In JazzTimes, Duck Baker observed: "He adapts his playing, with a minimum of fine tuning, to a gamut of styles from blues and swing to hard bop and free jazz. You could say that one hears the range and rambunctiousness of Lester Bowie tempered with some of Booker Little’s purpose and lyricism. One hears Chicago, that’s for sure. The supporting cast, while too extensive to credit individually, is never less than excellent... A proud statement by all concerned".

== Track listing ==
All Compositions BY Malachi Thompson except where noted

1. "47th Street" – 7:16
2. "Is It Not True Simply Because You Cannot Believe It?" (Billy Harper) – 7:56
3. "X" (Joe Ford) – 4:43
4. "C.J.'s Blues" – 5:07
5. "Some Freebop for Monk" – 13:56
6. "Miyako" (Wayne Shorter) – 6:43
7. "African Sun Dance" – 8:17
8. " Mystery of Jaaz (Suite): Discovery, the House of Jaaz" – 3:33
9. " Mystery of Jaaz (Suite): An Elevated Cry" – 8:07
10. " Mystery of Jaaz (Suite): Lamentation and the Harmony of Yah" – 5:05

== Personnel ==
- Malachi Thompson – trumpet
- Steve Berry – trombone
- Joe Ford – alto saxophone, soprano saxophone (tracks 3, 4 & 7)
- Billy Harper, Carter Jefferson (tracks 3, 4 & 7), Ron Bridgewater (track 1) – tenor saxophone
- Kirk Brown – piano
- Harrison Bankhead (tracks 1, 2, 5, 6 & 8–10), John Whitfield (tracks 3, 4 & 7) – bass
- Nasar Abedey (tracks 3, 4 & 7), Dana Hall (tracks 1, 2, 5, 6 & 8–10) – drums
- Dr. Cuz – percussion (track 7)
- Marianne Haynes – recitation (track 10)
- Dee Alexander (tracks 1 & 10), Vocal Poynt: Mae Koen, Dianne Madison, Byron Woods and Dan Porter (tracks 1 & 10) – vocals
