= New Standards (Malachi Thompson album) =

Studio album by Malachi Thompson
- Released: 1993
- Recorded: April 20–22, 1993
- Studio: Riverside, Chicago
- Genre: Jazz
- Length: 71:39
- Label: Delmark; DD-473
- Producer: Robert G. Koester

Malachi Thompson chronology
Lift Every Voice (1993)	New Standards (1993)	Buddy Bolden's Rag (1993)

New Standards is an album by the American jazz trumpeter Malachi Thompson, released by the Delmark label in 1993.

== Reception ==
Professional ratings
Review scores
Source	Rating
AllMusic	4/5 stars
The Penguin Guide to Jazz Recordings	3/4 stars

AllMusic reviewer Steven McDonald stated, "New Standards takes on a nice variety of material... The playing is entertainingly upbeat, keeping the music interesting even when Thompson and the band go off into improvisational wilds. Thompson's trumpet work is outstanding, entertaining and listenable without condescending to the production of light and fluffy jazz".

== Track listing ==
1. "Joshua" (Victor Feldman) – 6:38
2. "Pinnoccio" (Wayne Shorter) – 8:25
3. "Crescent" (John Coltrane) – 8:48
4. "Resolution" (Coltrane) – 5:57
5. "If I Only Had a Brain" (Harold Arlen, Yip Harburg) – 8:57
6. "We Speak" (Booker Little) – 11:31
7. "Dhyia Malika" (Malachi Thompson) – 8:25
8. "Chicago Soundscapes" (Thompson) – 12:58

== Personnel ==
- Malachi Thompson – trumpet
- Steve Berry – trombone (tracks 1, 2 & 5–8)
- Joe Ford – alto saxophone (tracks 5–8)
- Ron Bridgewater (tracks 1 & 2), Carter Jefferson (tracks 5–8), Sonny Seals (tracks 3 & 4) – tenor saxophone
- Kirk Brown – piano
- Yosef Ben Israel (tracks 1 & 2), John Whitfield (tracks 3–8) – bass
- Nasar Abedey (tracks 3, 4, 7 & 8), Avreeayl Ra (tracks 1, 2, 5 & 6) – drums
- Dr. Cuz – percussion (track 8)
