= Nova Bossa Nova =

Nova Bossa Nova was a Brazilian jazz ensemble consisting of Claudio Roditi on trumpet, Bob Mintzer on tenor sax, Joe Ford on alto sax, and Eddie Monteiro on vocals. They released one album in 1997, Jazz Influence. The first new Marcos Valle album available worldwide since the late 1960s, Nova Bossa Nova was a return to form. Much more than his superstar Brazilian contemporaries like Gilberto Gil and Caetano Veloso, Valle was up on trends in the dance community. The production was crunchy and indebted to acid jazz (with even a drum 'n' bass breakbeat or two), while the title track and "Bahia Blue" were just as slick and well-produced as his 1980s material for Arkadia Jazz.
