= Un'estate al mare (song) =

Single by Giuni Russo

from the album Energie (re-release)
- B-side: "Bing Bang Being"
- Released: 1982
- Genre: Pop, New wave
- Length: 3:16
- Label: CGD / Ariola
- Songwriter(s): Franco Battiato, Giusto Pio

Giuni Russo singles chronology
"Una vipera sarò" (1981)	"Un'estate al mare" (1982)	"Good Goodbye" (1982)

Music video
- "Un'estate al mare" on YouTube

"Un'estate al mare" (lit. 'A summer at the beach') is a 1982 song written by Franco Battiato and Giusto Pio and performed by Giuni Russo.

== Background ==
Following the tepid reception of the Battiato-produced Russo's previous album Energie, Battiato, who was fresh from the massive success of the album La voce del padrone, decided to pen a more commercial song for Russo to push her career.

== Lyrics ==
The song tells the story of a prostitute dreaming to take a break from her job to go on a vacation. Originally the lyrics were more sexually explicit, as they included the word "erezioni" ('erections'), later modified in "illusioni" ('illusions').

== Reception ==
The song entered the 1982 Festivalbar, winning the Disco Verde competition. It proved to be a major hit and became Russo's signature song, even if it tied Russo to the unwanted stereotype of an easy pop songs performer; Russo, who was interested to a more mature and sophisticated repertoire, ended up to refuse to perform the song for years.

== Cover versions ==
Paloma San Basilio covered the song in Spanish with the title "Unas vacaciones". Artists who covered the song also include Cecilia Gayle, Marvin, and Federica Abbate with Selton.

== Track listing ==
No.	Title	Writer(s)	Length
1.	"Un'estate al mare"	Franco Battiato, Giusto Pio	3:16
2.	"Bing Bang Being"	Giuni Russo, Maria Antonietta Sisini, Tommaso Tramonti	3:04

== Charts ==
Chart (1981)	Peak position
Italy (Musica e dischi)	2
