= Buddy Bolden's Rag =

Studio album by Malachi Thompson & Africa Brass featuring Lester Bowie
- Released: 1995
- Recorded: 1995
- Studio: Riverside, Chicago
- Genre: Jazz
- Length: 70:40
- Label: Delmark; DE-481
- Producer: Robert G. Koester

Malachi Thompson chronology
New Standards (1993)	Buddy Bolden's Rag (1995)	47th Street (1997)

Buddy Bolden's Rag (subtitled [100 Years of Jazz]) is an album by the American jazz trumpeter Malachi Thompson, released by the Delmark label in 1995.

== Reception ==
Professional ratings
Review scores
Source	Rating
AllMusic	4.5/5 stars
The Penguin Guide to Jazz Recordings	3/4 stars

AllMusic reviewer Alex Henderson stated: "On Buddy Bolden's Rag, Thompson and his band Africa Brass salute Bolden in an unconventional way; instead of playing traditional New Orleans jazz, they provide inside/outside post-bop that acknowledges Crescent City brass bands as well as avant-garde and AACM jazz. Thompson looks back on jazz's early history but does so without being the least bit dogmatic about it, and the result is a very enriching and unpredictable CD".

== Track listing ==
All compositions by Malachi Thompson except where noted

1. "Buddy Bolden's Rag" – 5:58
2. "World View" – 8:32
3. "The Chaser in Brazil" – 5:44
4. "We Bop" (Lester Bowie) – 5:40
5. "Nubian Call" – 12:42
6. "The Chaser in America" – 8:49
7. "Kojo Time" (Roland Alexander) – 7:17
8. "Harold the Great" (Bill McFarland) – 9:49
9. "A Mouse in the House" – 6:43

== Personnel ==
- Malachi Thompson – trumpet, conch shell, steer horn, sekulu
- David Spencer, Phillip Perkins, Kenny Anderson – trumpet
- Bill McFarland, Edwin Williams, Ray Ripperton – trombone
- Steve Berry – bass trombone
- Kirk Brown – piano
- Harrison Bankhead – bass
- Darryl Ervin – drums
- Dr. Cuz, Richard Lawrence – percussion

Guests

- Lester Bowie – trumpet (tracks 3, 5 & 6)
- Ari Brown – tenor saxophone (track 8)
- Zane Massey – tenor saxophone (track 7)
