= 13th House =

Studio album by McCoy Tyner
- Released: 1981
- Recorded: October 1980
- Genre: Jazz
- Label: Milestone
- Producer: Orrin Keepnews

McCoy Tyner chronology
| Quartets 4 X 4 (1980) | 13th House (1981) | La Leyenda de La Hora (1981) |

Professional ratings
Review scores
| Source | Rating |
|---|---|
| Allmusic | 4/5 stars |
| The Rolling Stone Jazz Record Guide | 4/5 stars |

13th House is a 1981 album by jazz pianist McCoy Tyner released on the Milestone label. It was recorded in October 1980 and features performances by Tyner with a big band that includes alto saxophonist Joe Ford, flautist Hubert Laws, tenor saxophonist Ricky Ford, trombonist Slide Hampton, bassist Ron Carter and trumpeters Oscar Brashear and Charles Sullivan.

== Reception ==
The Allmusic review by Scott Yanow states "everyone wanted to play with McCoy Tyner! The powerful music lives up to its potential".

== Track listing ==
All tracks are written by McCoy Tyner, except where noted.

| No. | Title | Length |
|---|---|---|
| 1. | "Short Suite" | 7:46 |
| 2. | "13th House" (Heath) | 5:58 |
| 3. | "Search for Peace" | 7:33 |
| 4. | "Love Samba" | 8:38 |
| 5. | "Leo Rising" (Foster) | 9:13 |

Recorded in NYC, October, 1980

== Personnel ==
- McCoy Tyner – piano, arranger
- Oscar Brashear – trumpet
- Kamau Muata Adilifu – flugelhorn
- Slide Hampton – trombone, arrangement
- Gregory Williams – french horn
- Bob Stewart – tuba
- Hubert Laws – piccolo, flute
- Joe Ford – alto saxophone, soprano saxophone, flute
- Ricky Ford – tenor saxophone, soprano saxophone
- Frank Foster – tenor saxophone, soprano saxophone, clarinet, arranger
- Ron Carter – bass
- Jack DeJohnette – drums
- Airto Moreira – percussion
- Dom Um Romao – percussion
- Jimmy Heath – arranger
