= Isaiah Collier (musician) =

American jazz musician (born 1998)

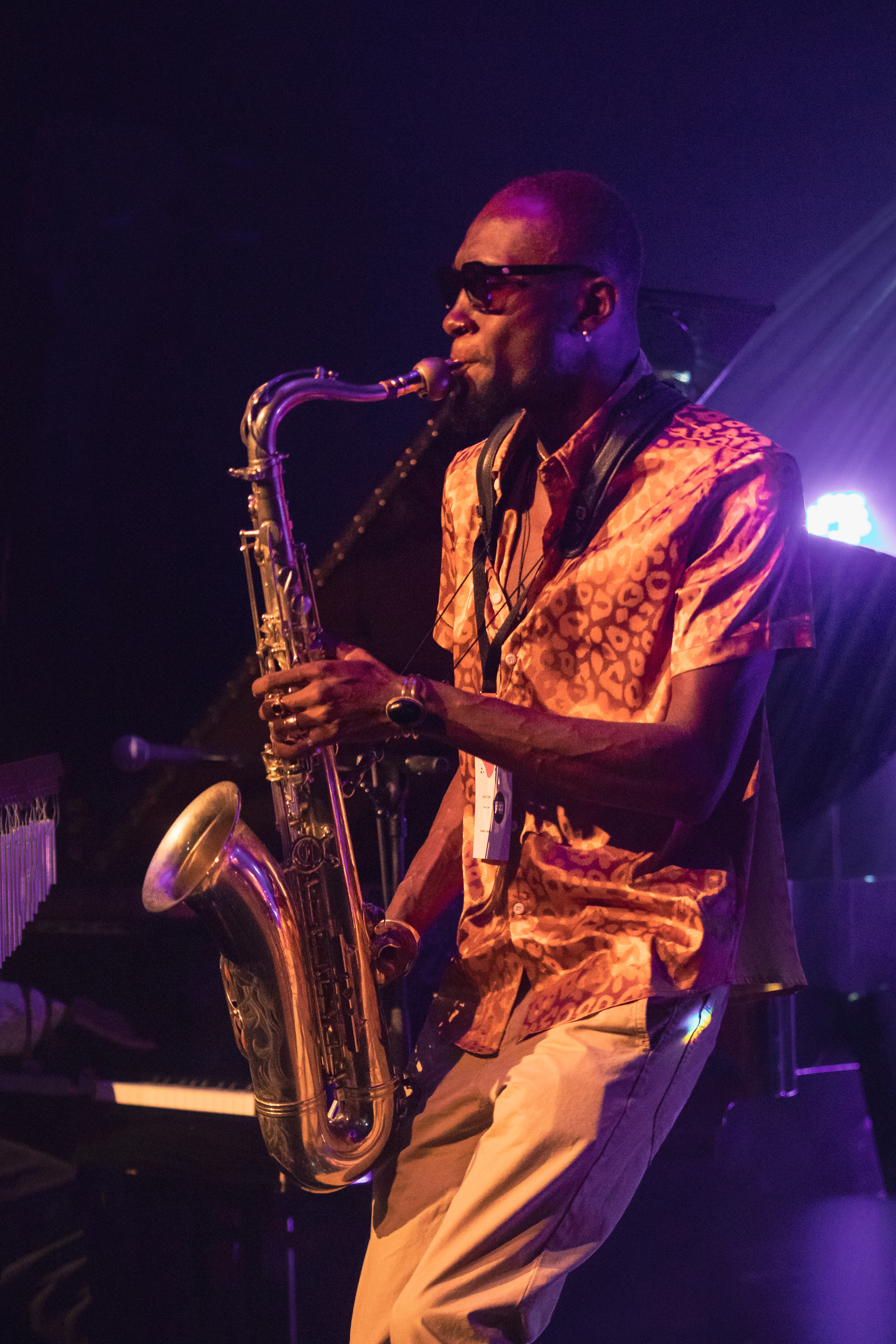
- Isaiah Collier during Kongsberg Jazzfestival with The Chosen Few at Energimølla July 8, 2022

Background information
- Born: 1998 (age 27–28)
- Genre: Jazz
- Instrument: saxophone
- Years active: 2018–present
- Member of: The Chosen Few
- Website: www.colliersworld.com

Isaiah Collier (born 1998) is an American jazz composer and saxophonist based in Chicago and Brooklyn. He started playing saxophone at age 11. Until 2024, he performed with his band The Chosen Few. He was selected as one of the top 25 rising jazz stars by Downbeat Magazine in July 2024. He has recorded six albums as of 2024. In 2025, he performed a tribute concert in honour of the 60th anniversary of John Coltrane's A Love Supreme.

== Discography ==
- Return of the Black Emperor (2018)
- Cosmic Transitions (2021)
- I AM BEYOND (2022)
- Parallel Universe (2023)
- The Almighty (2024)
- The World Is On Fire (2024)
