= Ken Chaney =

American musician, pianist and music educator (1938–2012)

Kenneth "Ken" Chaney (December 21, 1938 — December 19, 2012) was a Canadian-born American jazz pianist, composer and music teacher.

== Life and work ==
Chaney grew up in Edmonton, led dance bands as a teenager and moved first to Detroit, then to Chicago in the early 1960s. In 1965, he took part in the first sessions of the Association for the Advancement of Creative Musicians and in 1967, worked with Muhal Richard Abrams and Jodie Christian. During this time, he began his work as a music teacher and taught music theory. With the soul-jazz trio Young-Holt Unlimited around Redd Holt, he recorded the title Soulful Strut, an instrumental version of the song "Am I the Same Girl", which sold over a million copies and reached #3 on the Billboard Hot 100 charts. After the dissolution of Young-Holt Unlimited in the early 1970s, Chaney founded the post-hard bop sextet The Awakening, which played in the style of Art Blakey's Jazz Messengers, supplemented by the electric piano and musical influences from Woody Shaw and Pharoah Sanders. The band included Frank Gordon, Steve Galloway and Ari Brown, among others. The Awakening recorded two albums on Black Jazz; in 1972, the album Hear, Sense And Feel was released, followed by Mirage in 1973. The group later came together again (in 1998) for the Chicago Jazz Festival.

In the following years, Chaney led other bands, first his Experience from 1973, with which he toured internationally and recorded several albums. The group was voted the best jazz band in Chicago at the Ninth Annual Reggae Awards; in 1992, it received first prize at the Hennesy Best of Chicago Jazz Search. He also worked in the Jazz Links program of the Jazz Institute Chicago (JIC) and led monthly jam sessions at the Chicago Cultural Center. In the course of his career, Chaney played with John Klemmer (with whom he also made several albums), Milt Jackson, Eddie Harris, Slide Hampton and David Fathead Newman, among others, and worked with Chicago musicians such as Dee Alexander, Kimberly Gordon and Steve Hashimoto. He was also the long-time artistic director of the JIC concert series Jazz City and Bebop Brass.

== Death ==
Chaney died of natural causes on December 19, 2012, in his adopted hometown of Chicago, Illinois. He received a tribute from the Jazz Institute of Chicago, featuring both of his bands, the Experience and the Awakening.

A few months later, bandmate Ari Brown recorded a tribute to Chaney called "One for Ken" on his album Groove Awakening.
