= Giuni Russo =

Italian singer (1951–2004)

Background information
- Born: Giuseppa Romeo; 7 September 1951; Palermo, Italy
- Died: 13 September 2004 (aged 53) Milan, Italy
- Genres: Easy listening; experimental; pop; classical; jazz; opera
- Occupation: Singer
- Years active: 1968–2004
- Labels: EMI-Columbia; BASF; Durium; Ghibli; WEA; CGD; Ricordi; L'Ottava; NAR; Sony; Radiofandango; Edel
- Website: giunirusso.it

Giuseppa Romeo (7 September 1951 – 13 September 2004), known professionally as Giuni Russo (Italian pronunciation: [ˈdʒuːni ˈrusso]), was an Italian singer who specialised in experimental music after a short successful stint as an art-pop singer in the early 1980s. With her five-octave range, she could produce extremely high notes and experimental sounds. She sang in Italian, English, Sicilian, Neapolitan, Japanese, French, German, Chinese, Spanish, Hebrew, Arabic, Persian and Latin.

== Biography ==
Giuseppa Romeo was born in Palermo, Sicily, on 7 September 1951, the eighth of nine siblings. Busy with several family matters, her father Pietro registered her three days later, on 10 September.

As a child, singing was more important to Russo than playing or studying. She was often asked to perform at school. Her teacher offered her own desk to Russo to be used as a stage, but she was so shy she preferred to perform while hiding behind the classroom door. Her first public appearance was on a small stage at the Politeama Theatre in Palermo.

Without her family's knowledge, Russo took singing lessons from Master Ettore Gaiezza, paying him with the money earned from her local shows.

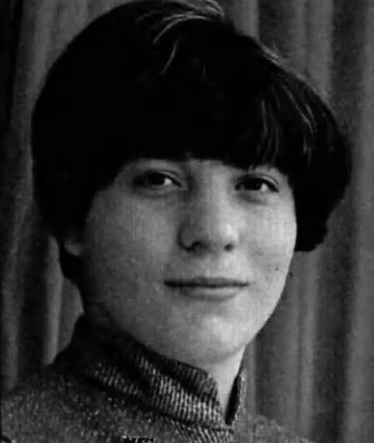
Giusy Romeo in 1967

At age 15, she sang at the Castrocaro Festival, reaching the semifinal. The following year she won the festival by unanimous vote, singing "Hurt" by Timi Yuro and "A chi" by Fausto Leali. The following year she competed in the Sanremo Festival under the name of Giusy Romeo, singing "No amore".

She released two singles during 1968, "No amore" and "L'onda". After her participation in Un Disco per l'Estate, Cantagiro and Festivalbar with the song "L'onda", she recorded the cover version of "Smoke in your eyes" and the cover of "I Say A Little Prayer" by Aretha Franklin in 1969. That year, she moved to Milan to collaborate with musician and songwriter Maria Antonietta Sisini.

=== 1970s ===
In the 1970s, Russo began with several participations as a chorist for many artists' publications. In 1972, she sang in the choirs of Balletto di Bronzo's Ys.

In 1974 she signed a contract for the German label BASF, which gave her the pseudonym of Junie Russo, later changed to the Italian spelling Giuni. The following year, her first LP, Love Is a Woman (sung in English), was released. In this period, she also collaborated with Sisini as a songwriter for other authors. Meanwhile, many singles were published, such as "Everything is gonna be alright", a cover by PP Arnold. The last single recorded as Junie Russo, "Mai", was released in 1976 for the Durium.

In the meantime, Russo and Sisini were appreciated as music composers for other artists' songs.

In 1978, she was renamed Giuni Russo and recorded a single for WEA (Italian arm of Warner Music Group), "Soli noi" (it), which became a surprise hit in France, leading to the French branch of RCA offering her a recording contract, an offer she turned down when she decided to remain in Italy.

=== 1980s ===
In 1979 she met the Sicilian singer-songwriter Franco Battiato, who produced her second LP, entitled Energie for the label CGD, released in 1981, containing the work of musicians such as Sisini, Franco Battiato, Giusto Pio, Alberto Radius and others.

In 1982, Giuni reached the peak of her popularity with the hit "Un'estate al mare", which went Gold Disc. She participated in the "Festivalbar", "Vota la voce", and many other events and broadcasts singing.

In 1983 she released the LP Vox, followed by her last work for that label LP Mediterranea (1984).

After divergences with the label's producer, Caterina Caselli, who wanted more commercial works, in 1986 she moved to the label Ricordi, for which she released the LPs Giuni (1986), ALBUM (1987) and the more experimental A casa di Ida Rubinstein (1988), which featured influences of classical music.

Giuni and her life companion, Maria Antonietta Sisini, began to undergo a religious conversion and became practising Catholics. Many of her works subsequently developed a religious nature, such as "La Sua Figura". Giuni became devoted to St. Ignatius of Loyola and especially St. Teresa of Ávila.

=== 1990s ===
In the 1990s, Russo devoted herself to World Music and music-theatre.

In 1992, she released Amala, an album with world-music sounds, in Arabic.

In 1994, she released a new album, Se fossi più simpatica sarei meno antipatica.

The title is inspired by Ettore Petrolini's monologue Fortunello. This album marked Russo's return to Emi, her first record company.

After two participations in the 'Premio Tenco' in 1994 with "Ciao amore ciao", a cover by Luigi Tenco, and in 1995 with a minishow. In 1997 Russo published the single "Gabbiano", with the label NAR International; a CD was supposed to follow, but that never happened because of a different point of view of the label manager.

Her first live album, Voce prigioniera, was released in 1998.

=== 2000s ===
In 2002, she released the second live album, Signorina Romeo, by Sony Music. An emotional journey through classic and unpublished songs, in which Giuni's spiritual research and the artistic and human evolution clearly emerge.

Russo competed in the Sanremo Music Festival 2003 with the song "Morirò d'amore" ("I Will Die of Love"), which she had written with Maria Antonietta Sisini and Vania Magelli in the 1980s. The song had been rejected by the Sanremo artistic commission twice before, in 1989 and 1997. It placed seventh, and was released as a single on 7 March 2003, with the album Morirò d'amore. On 28 November 2023, she released another new album, Demo de midi.

In April 2004, she released her last new album Napoli che canta, a musical suite thought of as a soundtrack for the eponymous mute film by Roberto Roberti, on DVD.

=== Death ===
Russo died from cancer in her home in Milan on the night of 13 September 2004, at age 53. She was buried in a section of the Cimitero Maggiore di Milano traditionally reserved for Carmelite nuns.

== Legacy ==
The year following her death, Russo's immense repertoire began to be published, starting with NAR, in 2005, of Mediterranea Tour, a 1984 concert, and the remixed and remastered A casa di Ida Rubinstein, which, in the meantime, became unobtainable on the market. The DVD/CD is, like all the previous and following works, produced by Maria Antonietta Sisini and is the best-selling product of all the charts, staying on the top for many weeks.

In 2005, after 25 years, Energie is back on the charts, the only case of the kind, reprinted by Wea and including three bonus tracks: Un'estate al mare, Bing bang being and Adeste fideles.

In 2006, Giuni virtually duets with various national and international artists in Unusual, in which Giuni's voice sings with Caparezza, Lene Lovich, Franco Battiato, Toni Child and others, alternating original musical arrangements with brand new ones.

2007 is the year of three publications: the whole remastered reprint Se fossi pi' simpatica sarei meno antipatica (1994), The complete Giuni, a triple anthological CD, the only official one, and the DVD Docufilm La sua figura of Franco Battiato. Both works immediately hit the charts.

In 2008, the album Cercati in me was released. It contains five previously unpublished and a fascinating ethnic-sounding mini-suite.

In 2009, he sees the light: the official biography, published by Bompiani, Giuni Russo, da Un'estate al mare al Carmelo, written by Bianca Pitzorno, with the collaboration of Maria Antonietta Sisini, and a note by Franco Battiato. In addition to the book, the box contains the DVD/Docufilm "La sua figura" (2007) by Franco Battiato and a CD of six tracks of unreleased demos.

In 2011, "A casa di Ida Rubinstein 2011", Cd+DVD, a new edition of the 1988 album with some great guests and a "jazz hint": Uri Caine, Brian Auger, Paolo Fresu.

In April 2012, the 1975 album Love Is a Woman was released on CD for the first time. The album, entirely sung in English, was recorded under the name "Junie Russo". Among the musicians was Enrico Rava on trumpet.

27 May 2012 The Gallery of the Zancanaro Theatre has been dedicated to Giuni Russo. On GiuniParaSiempre Fan Club's request, the City of Sacile, Friuli Venezia Giulia, was happy to pay tribute to Giuni, who in 2003 gave her last concert in that Theatre.

In 2013, Pope Francis personally wrote to Maria Antonietta Sisini, Giuni Russo's life companion, expressing his appreciation for the spiritual music of Giuni Russo.

== Discography ==
=== As Giusy Romeo ===
Single

- 1968 – No amore / Amerai Columbia/EMI (SCMQ 7082)
- 1968 – L'onda / Lui e Lei Columbia/EMI (SCMQ 7095)
- 1968 – I primi minuti / Fumo negli occhi Columbia/EMI (SCMQ 7118)

=== As Junie Russo ===
Single

- 1975 – Milk of Paradise / I've Drunk in my Dream BASF (06 13325-Q)
- 1975 – Everything Is Gonna Be Alright / Vodka BASF (06 13330-Q)
- 1975 – In trappola / Lui nell'anima GHIBLI (CD 4506)
- 1976 – Mai / Che mi succede adesso DURIUM (Ld A 7950)

Albums

- 1975 – Love Is a Woman BASF (21-23326 Q)

=== As Giuni Russo ===
Singles

- 1978 – Soli noi / La chiave ELEKTRA (T 12290)
- 1982 – Un'estate al mare / Bing bang being CGD (CGD 10401)
- 1982 – Good Good Bye / Post moderno CGD (CGD 10437)
- 1982 – Una Vipera Sarò / Tappeto Volante
- 1983 – Good Good Bye / Un'estate al mare
- 1984 – Mediterranea / Limonata cha cha cha CGD (CGD 10548)
- 1986 – Alghero / Occhiali colorati BUBBLE/RICORDI (BLU 9233)
- 1987 – Ragazzi al luna-park / Mango papaia BUBBLE/RICORDI (BLU 9238)
- 1987 – Adrenalina / Adrenalina (remix strumental) BUBBLE/RICORDI (BLUX 934)
- 1987 – Mango Papaia / Mango papaia (remix strumental) BUBBLE/RICORDI (BLUX ?)
- 1990 – Un'estate al mare / Una vipera sarò (CGD 3984 23892-9)
- 1994 – Se fossi più simpatica sarei meno antipatica
- 1995 – Un'estate al mare (love guitar remix) / Un'estate al mare (deep mix) / Un'estate al mare (July 41 st) ITWHY (ITW 05)
- 1997 – Gabbiano / Fonti mobili NAR (NAR 40132)
- 2000 – Un'estate al mare (space mix) / Un'estate al mare (cub mix) / Un'estate al mare (dub version) HITLAND (EXTRA 05 CDs)
- 2003 – Morirò d'amore / Il re del mondo (live)
- 2006 – Un'estate al mare (remix feat. Megahertz) – PROMO
- 2006 – Adrenalina (remix feat. MAB) – PROMO
- 2006 – Una vipera sarò (remix feat. Caparezza) – PROMO

Albums

- 1981 – Energie CGD (CGD 20269)
- 1983 – Vox CGD (CGD 20360)
- 1984 – Mediterranea CGD (CGD 20409)
- 1986 – Giuni BUBBLE/RICORDI (BLULP 1822)
- 1987 – Album BUBBLE/RICORDI (BLULP 1825)
- 1988 – A casa di Ida Rubinstein L’OTTAVA/EMI (64 7915301)
- 1992 – Amala CGD (4509-90011-2)
- 1994 – Se fossi più simpatica sarei meno antipatica EMI (7243 8 29956 2 3)
- 1998 – Voce prigioniera NAR (NAR 1349 2)
- 2002 – Signorina Romeo Live
- 2003 – Morirò d'Amore
- 2003 – Demo De Midi
- 2004 – Napoli che canta
- 2006 – Unusual
- 2008 – Cercati in me
- 2011 – A casa di Ida Rubinstein 2011 Cd+ Dvd
- 2012 – Love Is a Woman
- 2016 – Fonte d'amore

DVDs

- 2004 – Napoli che canta
- 2005 – Mediterranea Tour (with CDs)
- 2007 – La sua figura

Compilations

- 1983 – Un'estate al mare
- 1987 – Sere d'agosto
- 1989 – I successi di Giuni Russo SPINNAKER/RICORDI (SPI13)
- 1990 – Le più belle canzoni CGD musicA (9031 72212-2)
- 1996 – Onde leggere TRING (TRI 028)
- 1997 – La sposa FUEGO (PCD 2100)
- 1999 – Alghero REPLAY MUSIC (RSCD 8032)
- 2000 – Il meglio (rearranged tracks) MR MUSIC/D.V. MORE RECORD (MRCD 4198)
- 2000 – I miei successi (rearranged tracks) D.V. MORE RECORD (CD DV 6411)
- 2003 – Irradiazioni (unreleased tracks)
- 2004 – Voce che grida
- 2007 – The Complete Giuni (with unreleased tracks and rearranged tracks)

== Bibliography ==
- 2009 – Bianca Pitzorno, Maria Antonietta Sisini. Giuni Russo, da Un'estate al mare al Carmelo (with DVD La sua figura and CD with tracks unreleased demos). Bompiani, 2009. ISBN 8845263533.
