= Edward Wilkerson =

- Born: Edward Wilkerson Jr. July 27, 1953 (age 73); Terre Haute, Indiana, U.S.
- Genre: Jazz
- Occupations: bandleader and composer and musician
- Instruments: Saxophone, Piano, Clarinet, Didgeridoo
- Labels: Thrill Jockey, Sessoms

Edward L. Wilkerson Jr. (born July 27, 1953, in Terre Haute, Indiana) is an internationally recognized American jazz composer, arranger, musician, and educator based in Chicago. As founder and director of the cutting-edge octet 8 Bold Souls, and the 25-member performance ensemble Shadow Vignettes, Wilkerson has toured festivals and concert halls throughout the United States, Europe, Japan, and the Middle East. "Defender", a large-scale piece for Shadow Vignettes, was commissioned by the Lila Wallace/Reader's Digest Fund and featured in the 10th Anniversary of New Music America, a presentation of BAM's Next Wave Festival.

His music can be heard on 14 recordings, including two film soundtracks and the critically acclaimed albums Birth of a Notion, and 8 Bold Souls, both on his own Sessoms Records label.

One of the great saxophone and clarinet players on the Chicago scene, Wilkerson from the 1980s into the new millennium may have become best known as a bandleader and composer, particularly associated with medium- to large-scale projects (somewhat daunting in an era when creative music bandleaders are challenged to keep even small ensembles together). He has also been a major presence in Chicago's Association for the Advancement of Creative Musicians (AACM), teaching composition at the organization's music school and serving for a time as AACM president.

The AACM collective, with its spirit of community as well as unbridled creativity, has been a predominant nurturing force for Wilkerson and has informed much of his work. He was an original member of the Ethnic Heritage Ensemble (formed by percussionist Kahil El'Zabar upon El'Zabar's 1976 graduation from the AACM school) and remained with the group until 1997, when he was replaced by Ernest "Khabeer" Dawkins. However, while appearing on such Ethnic Heritage Ensemble recordings as Three Gentlemen From Chicago (Moers), Hang Tuff (Open Minds), and Dance with the Ancestors (Chameleon), Wilkerson was also becoming more involved in leading his own projects, which characteristically saw the reedman thinking big. His most ambitious project, Shadow Vignettes, was initiated in 1979; with 25 musicians and incorporating dance, poetry, and visual arts, the ensemble's influences include the big band work of Muhal Richard Abrams, Duke Ellington, Count Basie, and Sun Ra. Shadow Vignettes released one CD, Birth of a Notion, on the Sessoms Records label in 1985. One of Shadow Vignettes' major pieces is entitled "Defender", commissioned by the Lila Wallace/Reader's Digest Fund and featured in the tenth anniversary of New Music America, presented by the Brooklyn Academy of Music's Next Wave Festival.

Wilkerson's best-documented ensemble as a leader is 8 Bold Souls, an octet initiated in January 1985 with a series of Thursday-night concerts at the Chicago Filmmakers performance space. The popularity of the concerts led Wilkerson to establish 8 Bold Souls as a working band, and since their formation, four Souls CDs have been issued: 8 Bold Souls on Sessoms Records, Sideshow and Ant Farm on Arabesque Records, and Last Option on Thrill Jockey. Influenced by the small groups of Duke Ellington and Jimmie Lunceford, 8 Bold Souls also makes plenty of room for adventurous experimentation in the AACM spirit, drawing fully on the unusual sonic possibilities of the group's instrumentation of two woodwinds, trumpet, trombone, cello, tuba, bass, and trap drums. Overall, Wilkerson's work may be heard on 14 recordings, including two film soundtracks.

In addition to his work with 8 Bold Souls, Shadow Vignettes, and the Ethnic Heritage Ensemble, Wilkerson has also played with the AACM Big Band, Roscoe Mitchell, Douglas Ewart, The Temptations, Chico Freeman, Geri Allen, the Lyric Opera of Chicago, Muhal Richard Abrams, Aretha Franklin, and George Lewis.

Wilkerson's most recent release is the ensemble performance, Frequency, on the Thrill Jockey label. Encompassing distinctive compositions, and high-quality improvisational flights plus World and Native American sonic echoes, this debut CD confirms both the talents of the band Frequency and the continued adaptability of AACM members.

Besides the AACM-link, each participant in this Chicago-based quartet brings different sensibilities to the session. It includes reedist Ed Wilkerson and bassist Harrison Bankhead from 8 Bold Souls. Flautist Nicole Mitchell leads her own groups as well as working as an educator, while veteran percussionist Avreeayl Ra’s AACM involvement goes back almost to the cooperative's founding.

Wilkerson has received grants from the Illinois Arts Council, the National Endowment for the Arts, Meet the Composer, and the Community Arts Assistance Program, and has been cited in numerous music polls.

In his free time, Wilkerson, past president and longtime member of the Association for the Advancement of Creative Musicians (AACM), teaches composition at the AACM School of Music.

== Discography (incomplete as leader/coleader) ==
- 1985 - Birth of a Notion (& Shadow Vignettes) - Sessom Records
- 1986 - 8 Bold Souls - Sessom Records
- 1992 - Light on the Path (quartet) - Sound Aspects (Ed Wilkerson, Rod McGaha, Harrison Bankhead, Reggie Nicholson)
- 1992 - Sideshow (& 8 Bold Souls) - Arabesque Jazz
- 1994 - Ant Farm (& 8 Bold Souls) - Arabesque Jazz
- 1999 - Last Option (& 8 Bold Souls) - Thrill Jockey
- 1999 - Frequency (quartet) - Thrill Jockey (Ed Wilkerson, Nicole Mitchell, Harrison Bankhead, Avreeayl Ra')
