= Mwata Bowden =

American jazz musician

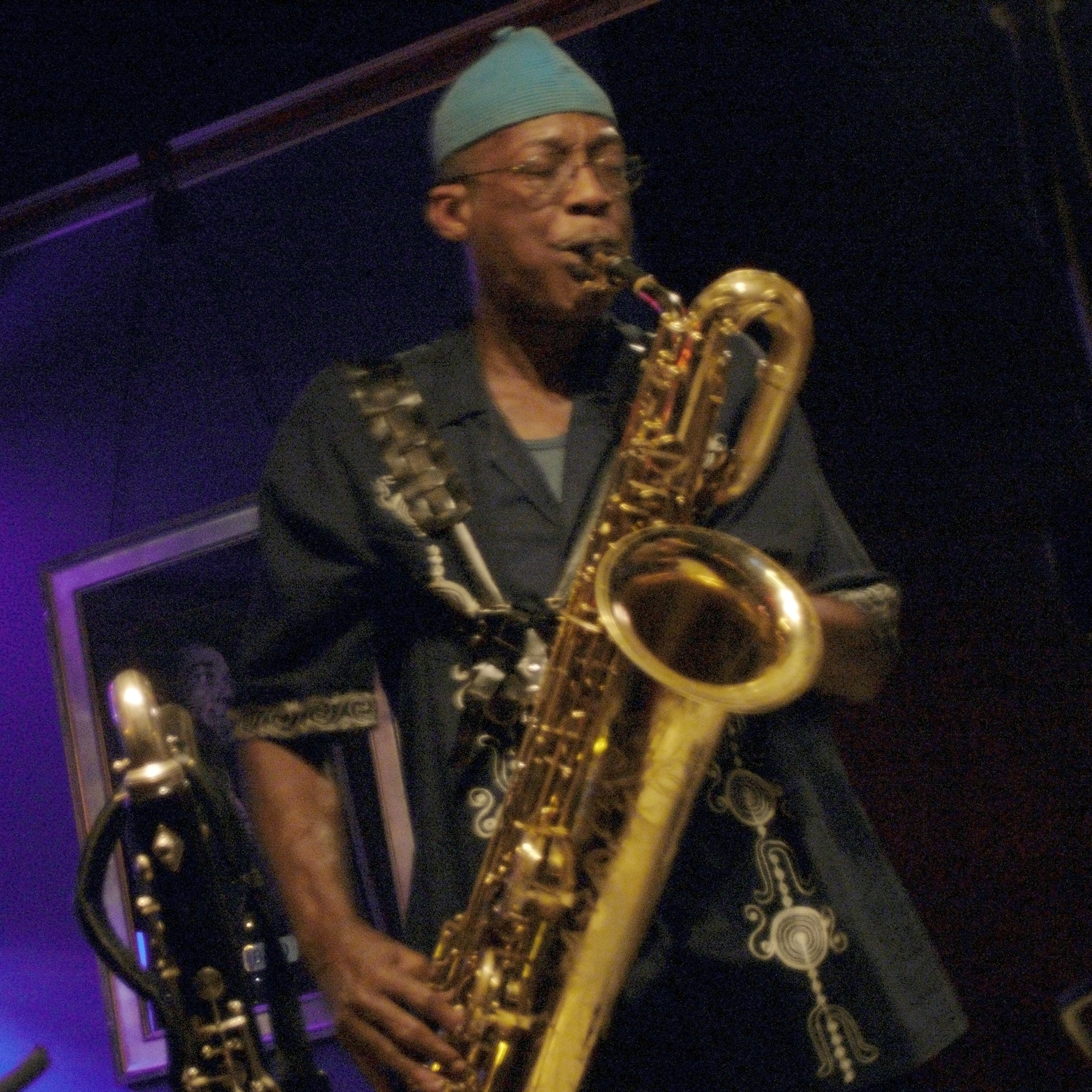

Mwata Bowden (born October 11, 1947 in Memphis, Tennessee, United States) is an American jazz reeds player associated with the Association for the Advancement of Creative Musicians and an instructor in improvisational Jazz at the University of Chicago. He is part of a group known as 8 Bold Souls but also frequently engages in collaborations with Tatsu Aoki, and helped establish the Miyumi Project which was a blend of music with different ethnic backgrounds, highlighting contributions from Japanese taiko drumming in the framework of jazz music.

As part of his regular repertoire, Bowden plays a range of saxophones and clarinets as well as flute and didgeridoo.

He teaches young aspiring musicians in the Chicago area. Mwata has a son who performs "Disco Poetry" under the name Khari B.
