= Malachi Thompson =

American jazz trumpeter and bandleader (1949–2006)

Malachi Richard Thompson (August 21, 1949, in Princeton, Kentucky — July 16, 2006), was an American avant-garde jazz trumpet player. In addition to his own work as a bandleader, Thompson was known for his work in the brass ensemble led by fellow trumpeter Lester Bowie.

Born in Princeton, Kentucky, Malachi Thompson moved to Chicago as a child. He credited his interest in the trumpet to hearing Count Basie's band at the Regal Theatre when he was 11 years old. Thompson worked in the rhythm and blues scene on Chicago's South Side as a teen. In 1968, he joined the Association for the Advancement of Creative Musicians (AACM), spending some time in the AACM big band. He performed and toured with the Operation Breadbasket Big Band, which was affiliated with the Southern Christian Leadership Conference.

Thompson graduated from Governors State University in 1974 with a degree in music composition.

He worked with saxophonists Joe Henderson, Jackie McLean, Frank Foster, and Archie Shepp, among other musicians, while living in New York City. Thompson formed his "Freebop" band in 1978, and eventually relocated to Washington, D.C. He also worked with Lester Bowie's Hot Trumpets Repertory Company and formed Africa Brass, a group inspired by traditional New Orleans brass bands.

With a goal of preserving the Sutherland Theater on Chicago's South Side, he founded the Sutherland Community Arts Initiative, a non-profit corporation, in 1991. He also wrote incidental music for a play about the theater.

Informed in 1989 that he suffered from T-cell lymphoma and had one year to live, Thompson claimed he was healed by radiation and reading about jazz. He died in Chicago, Illinois, from a relapse of his cancer in 2006.

== Discography ==
=== As leader ===
- The Seventh Son (RA, 1980)
- Legends and Heroes (RA, 1983)
- Spirit (Delmark, 1989)
- The Jaz Life (Delmark, 1992)
- Lift Every Voice (Delmark, 1993) with Africa Brass
- New Standards (Delmark, 1993)
- Buddy Bolden's Rag (Delmark, 1995) with Africa Brass featuring Lester Bowie
- 47th Street (Delmark, 1997)
- Freebop Now! (Delmark, 1998)
- Rising Daystar (Delmark, 1999)
- Timeline (Delmark, 2000) recorded 1972–86
- Talking Horns (Delmark, 2001)
- Blue Jazz (Delmark, 2003)

=== As sideman ===
- Lester Bowie's Brass Fantasy, Works (ECM)
- Lester Bowie's Brass Fantasy, Twilight Dreams (Virgin)
- Lester Bowie's Brass Fantasy, I Only Have Eyes for You (ECM)
- Lester Bowie's Brass Fantasy, Avant Pop (ECM)
- Kalaparusha Maurice McIntyre, Ram's Run (Cadence)
- Shamek Farrah, La Dee La La (RA)
- Errol Parker, Tentet (Sahara)
- Archie Shepp, Attica Blues (Blue Marge)
- Mustafa, Polygamy (Fatima)
- Hubert Eaves, Esoteric Funk (Inner City)
- Kalaparusha Maurice McIntyre, Kwansa (Baystate)
- Roland Alexander, Live at the Axis (Kharma)
- Gil Scott-Heron, The Baron (Soundtrack) (Arista)
- Quincy Jones, Save the Children (Soundtrack) (Capitol)
