= Whit Dickey =

American drummer

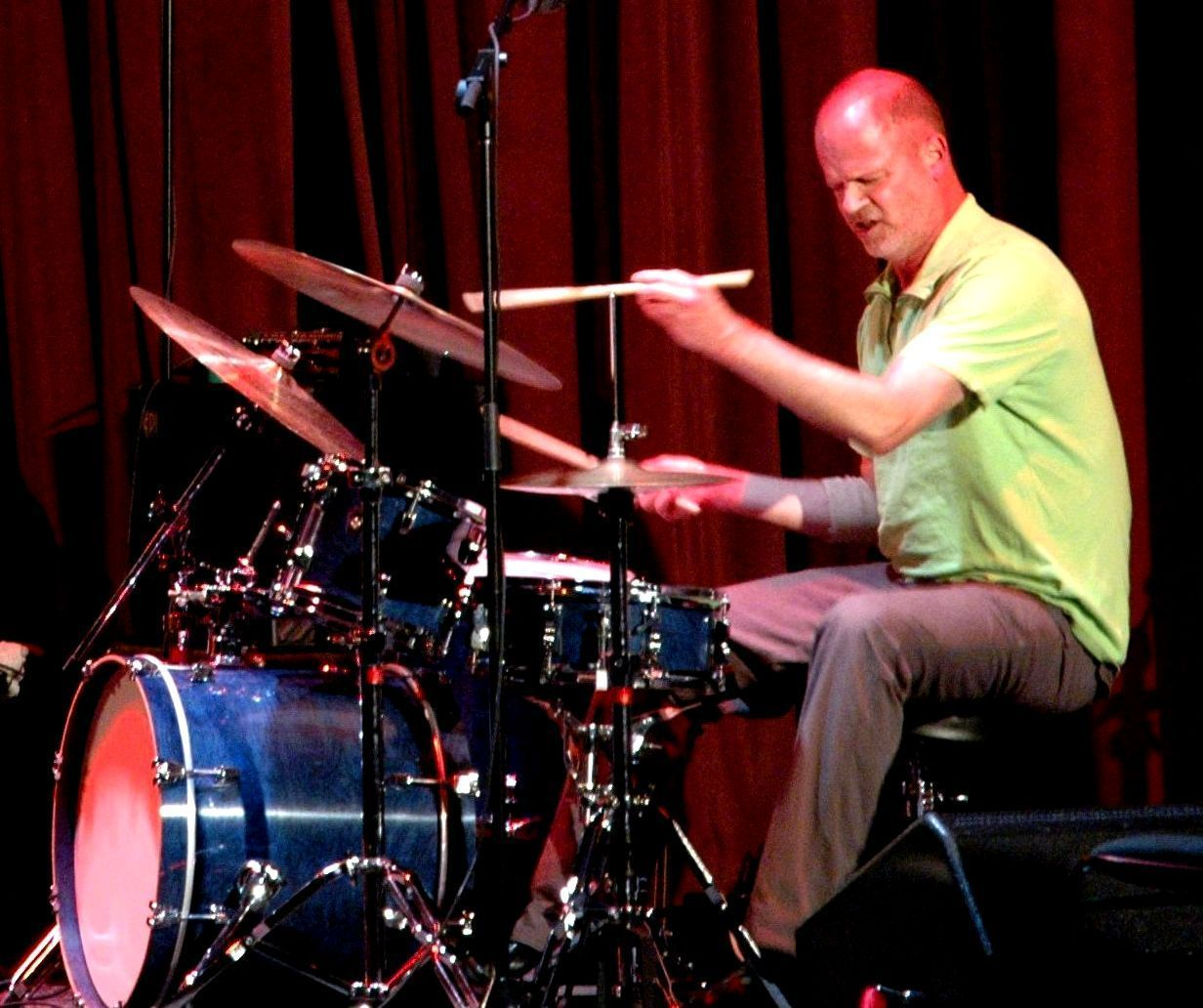
- Dickey at the world premiere of the David S. Ware Unit, International House, Philadelphia, January 12, 2007

Background information
- Born: May 28, 1954 (age 71); New York City, U.S.
- Genres: Jazz, free jazz avant-garde jazz, free improvisation
- Occupation: Musician
- Instrument: Drums

Whit Dickey (born May 28, 1954) is an American drummer. He has recorded albums with David S. Ware and Matthew Shipp.

== Biography ==
His first album as a leader was Transonic, in 1998. Two years later, Wobbly Rail issued his Big Top. In 2001, Dickey recorded six of his compositions with Mat Maneri, Shipp, and Rob Brown under the name Nommonsemble, resulting in the album Life Cycle.

== Discography ==
=== As leader ===
Release year	Title	Label	Notes
1998	Transonic	AUM Fidelity	Trio, with Rob Brown (alto sax, flute), Chris Lightcap (bass)
2000	Big Top	Wobbly Rail	Quartet, with Joe Morris (guitar), Chris Lightcap (bass), Rob Brown (alto sax, tenor sax, flute)
2001	Life Cycle	AUM Fidelity	As the band The Nommonsemble; quartet with Rob Brown (alto sax, flute), Mat Maneri (viola), Matthew Shipp (piano)
2002	Prophet Moon	Riti	As the band Trio Ahxoloxha; with Joe Morris (guitar), Rob Brown (alto sax)
2004	Coalescence	Clean Feed	Quartet, with Roy Campbell (trumpet), Rob Brown (alto sax, flute), Joe Morris (bass)
2005	In a Heartbeat	Clean Feed	Quintet, with Roy Campbell (trumpet, flugelhorn), Rob Brown (alto sax), Joe Morris (guitar), Chris Lightcap (bass)
2006	Sacred Ground	Clean Feed	Quartet, with Roy Campbell (trumpet), Rob Brown (alto sax), Joe Morris (bass)
2009	Emergence	Not Two	Trio, with Daniel Carter (reeds, trumpet, flute), Eri Yamamoto (piano)
2016	Fierce Silence	Clean Feed	Duo, with Kirk Knuffke (cornet)
2017	Vessel in Orbit	AUM Fidelity	Trio, with Mat Maneri (viola), Matthew Shipp (piano)
2019	Peace Planet / Box of Light	AUM Fidelity	Peace Planet (Quartet): with Rob Brown (alto sax), Matthew Shipp (piano), William Parker (bass) / Box of Light (Quartet): with Rob Brown (alto sax), Steve Swell (trombone), Michael Bisio (bass)
2020	Morph	ESP-Disk	CD 1: Reckoning: with Matthew Shipp (piano); CD 2: Pacific Noir with Nate Wooley (trumpet), Matthew Shipp (piano)
2020	Expanding Light	Tao Forms	Trio: Brandon Lopez (bass), Rob Brown (alto sax)

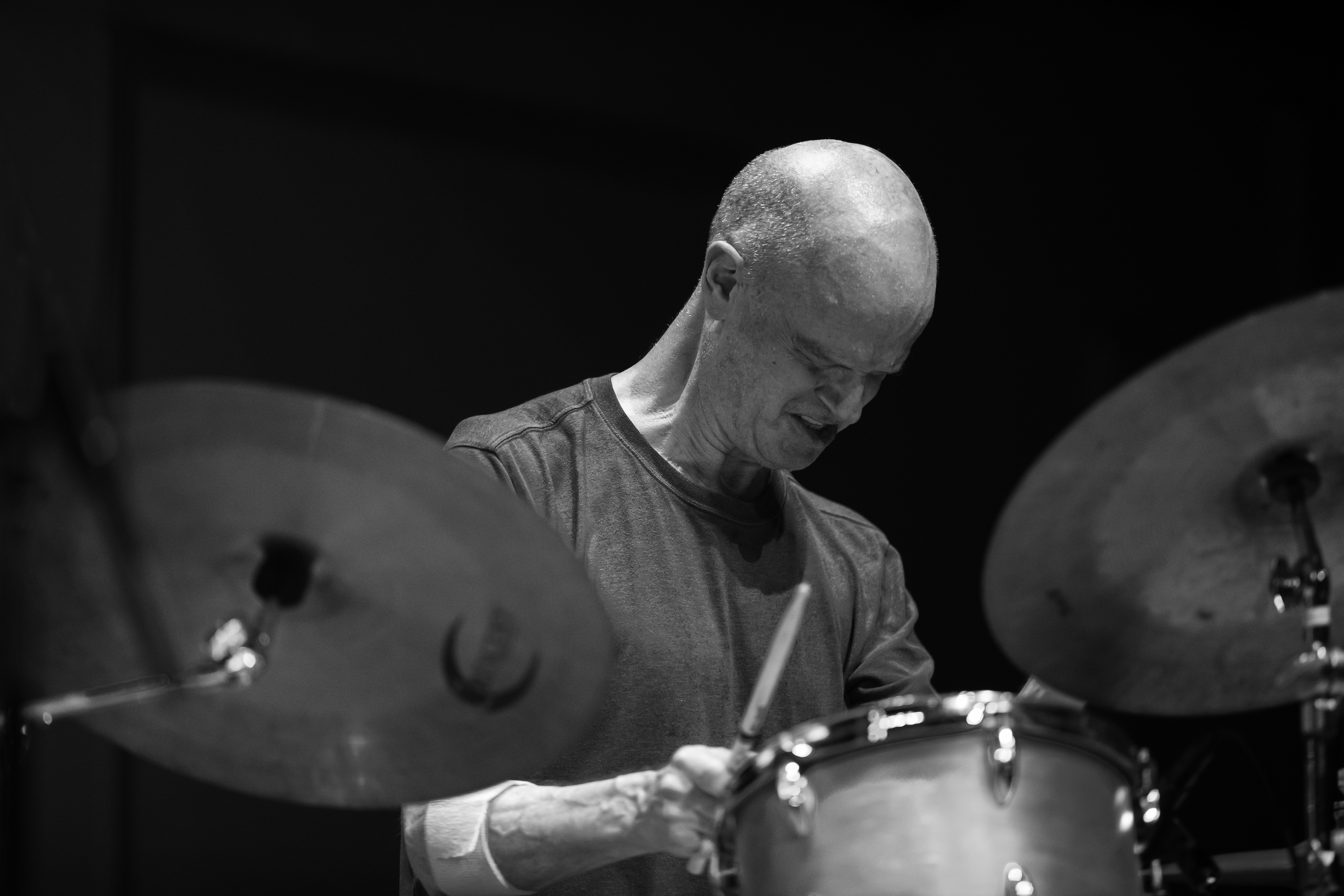
Whit Dickey, Arts for Art - Vision Festival 2024. Photo by Marek Lazarski

=== As sideman ===
Release year	Leader	Title	Label
1993	David S. Ware	Third Ear Recitation	DIW
1994	David S. Ware	Earthquation	DIW
1995	David S. Ware	Cryptology	Homestead
1996	David S. Ware	Oblations and Blessings	Silkheart
1996	David S. Ware	DAO	Homestead
1992	Matthew Shipp	Points	Silkheart
1992	Matthew Shipp	Circular Temple	Quinton
1995	Matthew Shipp	Critical Mass	2.13.61
1996	Matthew Shipp	Prism	Brinkman
1997	Matthew Shipp	The Flow of X	2.13.61
2007	Matthew Shipp	Piano Vortex	Thirsty Ear
2008	Matthew Shipp	Right Hemisphere	RogueArt
2008	Matthew Shipp	Cosmic Suite	Not Two
2009	Matthew Shipp	Harmonic Disorder	Thirsty Ear
2011	Matthew Shipp	Art of the Improviser	Thirsty Ear
2012	Matthew Shipp	Elastic Aspects	Thirsty Ear
2014	Matthew Shipp	Root of Things	Relative Pitch
2015	Matthew Shipp	To Duke	RogueArt
2017	Matthew Shipp	Not Bound	Fortune
2018	Matthew Shipp	Sonic Fiction	ESP-Disk'
1992	Rob Brown	Youniverse	Riti
1996	Joe Morris	Elsewhere	Homestead
2012	Ivo Perelman	The Clairvoyant	Leo Records
2013	Ivo Perelman	Enigma	Leo Records
2013	Ivo Perelman	The Edge	Leo Records
2014	Ivo Perelman	The Other Edge	Leo Records
2015	Ivo Perelman	Tenorhood	Leo Records
2015	Ivo Perelman	Butterfly Whispers	Leo Records
2016	Ivo Perelman	Soul	Leo Records
2016	Ivo Perelman	The Art Of The Improv Trio Volume 2	Leo Records
2017	Ivo Perelman	The Art Of Perelman-Shipp Volume 3: Pandora	Leo Records
2017	Ivo Perelman	The Art Of Perelman-Shipp Volume 5: Rhea	Leo Records
