= Piano Sutras =

Studio album by Matthew Shipp
- Released: 2013
- Recorded: February 20, 2013
- Studio: Park West Studios, Brooklyn
- Genre: Jazz
- Length: 52:11
- Label: Thirsty Ear
- Producer: Peter Gordon

Matthew Shipp chronology
Rex, Wrecks & XXX (2012)	Piano Sutras (2013)	Root of Things (2014)

Piano Sutras is a solo album by American jazz pianist Matthew Shipp, which was recorded in 2013 and released on Thirsty Ear's Blue Series.

== Reception ==
Professional ratings
Review scores
Source	Rating
Allmusic	4/5 stars
Down Beat	4/5 stars

In his review for AllMusic, Thom Jurek states " As a whole, Piano Sutras is instructive; it showcases Shipp's musical dialogue with the listener as evolutionary. It offers an incremental glimpses into his process of discovery and evidence of his mastery when kinetically applying his finely tuned sense of hearing."

The Down Beat review by Daniel A. Brown describes the album as "a 13-track collection of pieces that are in turn meditative and aggressive, at times in the same song" and says that "also further reveals Shipp’s mastery of dynamic playing, his awareness of both the timbral limits and sonic possibilities of the piano."

The All About Jazz review by John Sharpe notes that "Of all his outings, Piano Sutras most resembles Un Piano in that it comes across as a series of spontaneous improvisations, eschewing the more overtly scripted numbers present on other studio sessions such as 4D and One."

The JazzTimes review by Bill Beuttler states "Nobody judging Shipp by Piano Sutras could accuse him of lacking a language of his own. Shipp himself admits no influences. To the extent others might recognize them here, they seem drawn from artists similarly removed from conventional jazz piano."

In a review for Tiny Mix Tapes Clifford Allen notes that "Piano Sutras may at times seem singular and hermetic, separate as it is from group music, but Shipp's solos are multivalent and extraordinarily open."

The PopMatters review by Will Layman states "Piano Sutras is a glorious, generous, fully mature expression of creativity that could only have come from one artist. It is as good and adventurous as jazz is going to sound in 2013."

== Track listing ==
All compositions by Matthew Shipp except as indicated

1. "Piano Sutras" – 4:46
2. "Cosmic Shuffle" – 5:55
3. "Surface to Curve" – 3:48
4. "Blue to a Point" – 4:50
5. "Cosmic Dust" – 2:57
6. "Giant Steps" (John Coltrane) – 1:11
7. "Uncreated Light" – 3:48
8. "Fragment of a Whole" – 4:34
9. "Space Bubble" – 4:32
10. "Nefertiti" (Wayne Shorter) – 2:18
11. "Angelic Brain Cell" – 5:49
12. "Silent Cube" – 3:45
13. "The Indivisible" – 3:58

== Personnel ==
- Matthew Shipp - piano
