= The Gospel According to Matthew & Michael =

Studio album by Matthew Shipp
- Released: 2015
- Recorded: October 30, 2014
- Studio: Parkwest Studios, Brooklyn
- Genre: Jazz
- Length: 60:42
- Label: Relative Pitch
- Producer: Matthew Shipp

Matthew Shipp chronology
To Duke (2015)	The Gospel According to Matthew & Michael (2015)	Our Lady of the Flowers (2015)

The Gospel According to Matthew & Michael is an album by American jazz pianist Matthew Shipp, which was recorded in 2014 and released on Relative Pitch. It was the first recording featuring his Chamber Ensemble, a trio with Michael Bisio on bass and Mat Maneri on viola. Shipp led a similar group with Maneri and bassist William Parker in the late 1990s and early 2000s known as the String Trio, which recorded the albums By the Law of Music and Expansion, Power, Release.

== Reception ==
Professional ratings
Review scores
Source	Rating
Down Beat	2.5/5 stars

The Down Beat review by Bradley Bambarger states "The 15 'chapters' of Shipp’s archly titled yet intense, interior suite don’t offer much of a journey in terms of color—this hour of music ranges from austerely ruminative to evocative of angst in the manner of postwar high modernism."

In a review for Tiny Mix Tapes, Clifford Allen says "The Gospel According to Matthew and Michael is of a piece with much of Shipp’s work, as it focuses on multivalent communication between individuals to create a group language that is both singular and partial."

== Track listing ==
1. "Chapter 1" – 4:22
2. "Chapter 2" – 2:03
3. "Chapter 3" – 2:24
4. "Chapter 4" – 4:33
5. "Chapter 5" – 2:20
6. "Chapter 6" – 3:57
7. "Chapter 7" – 2:35
8. "Chapter 8" – 6:57
9. "Chapter 9" – 3:02
10. "Chapter 10" – 2:36
11. "Chapter 11" – 5:55
12. "Chapter 12" – 3:00
13. "Chapter 13" – 4:02
14. "Chapter 14" – 8:16
15. "Chapter 15" – 4:40

== Personnel ==
- Matthew Shipp – piano
- Michael Bisio – bass
- Mat Maneri – viola
