= To Duke =

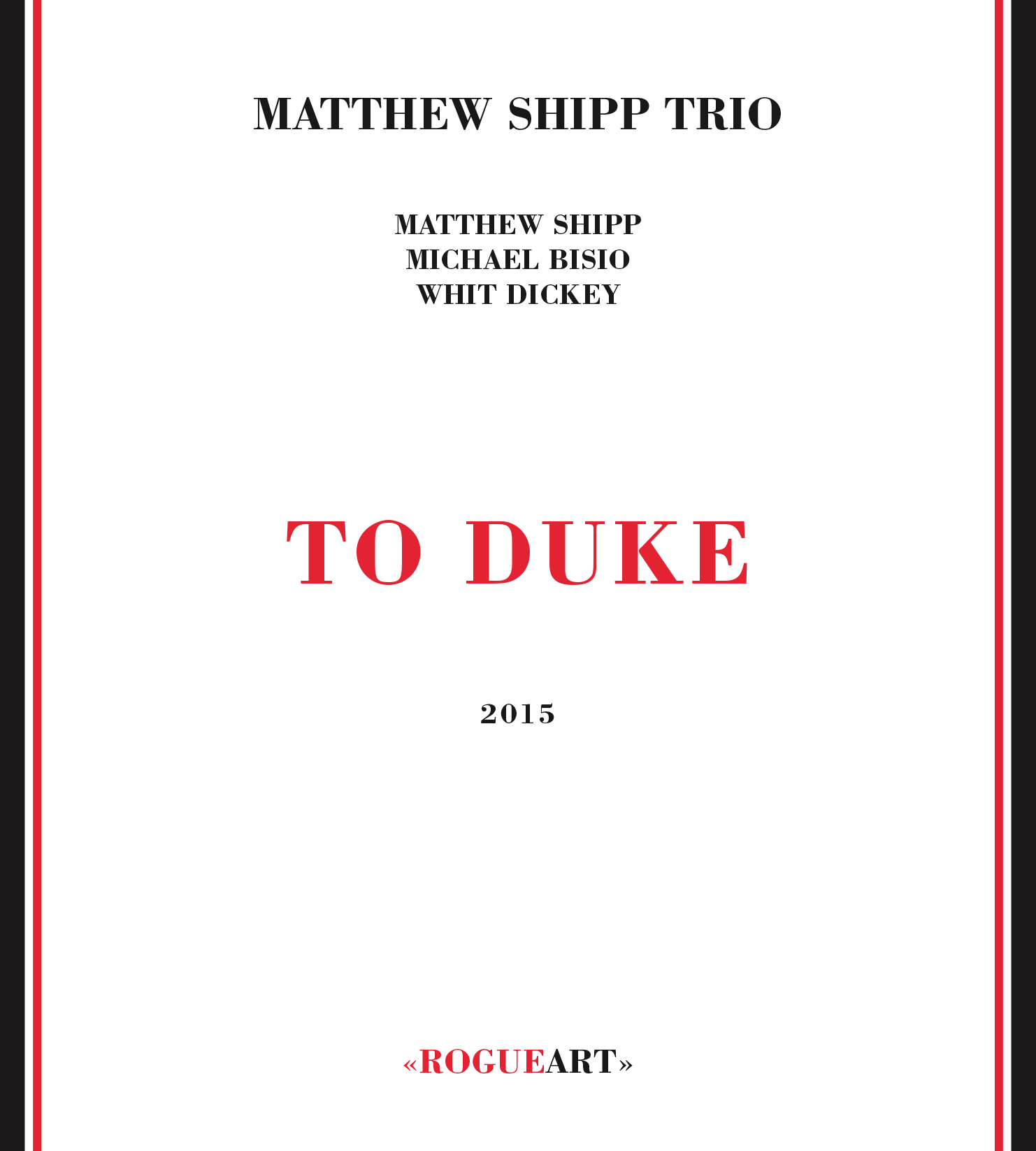

Studio album by Matthew Shipp
- Released: 2015
- Recorded: June 10, 2014
- Studio: LowFish Studio, New York City
- Genre: Jazz
- Length: 56:28
- Label: RogueArt
- Producer: Michel Dorbon

Matthew Shipp chronology
I've Been to Many Places (2014)	To Duke (2015)	The Gospel According to Matthew & Michael (2015)

To Duke is an album by American jazz pianist Matthew Shipp, which was recorded in 2014 and released on the French RogueArt label. The album is a tribute to Duke Ellington, featuring Shipp's trio with bassist Michael Bisio and drummer Whit Dickey playing seven Ellington classics plus some Shipp compositions.

== Reception ==
Professional ratings
Review scores
Source	Rating
Down Beat	4/5 stars

The Down Beat review by Bradley Bambarger notes that "Shipp’s instrument has been captured well on To Duke—whether he’s playing glittering lines in the Ellingtonia or the prepared-piano phrases of his original “Tone Poem For Duke”—so it’s too bad the hardworking rhythm section sounds so woolly and boomy."

The All About Jazz review by Mark Corroto states "The trio suggests that if you want to listen to Duke, then buy Ellington records. But if you want to magnify the experience, then try some new music."

== Track listing ==
All compositions by Matthew Shipp except as indicated

1. "Prelude to Duke" – 0:44
2. "In a Sentimental Mood" (Duke Ellington) – 6:19
3. "Satin Doll" (Duke Ellington / Billy Strayhorn) – 8:48
4. "I Got It Bad and That Ain't Good" (Duke Ellington) – 5:03
5. "Take the A Train" (Billy Strayhorn) – 9:04
6. "Mood Indigo" (Duke Ellington / Barney Bigard) – 5:47
7. "Dickey Duke" – 4:44
8. "Tone Poem for Duke" – 5:02
9. "Prelude to a Kiss" (Duke Ellington) – 3:54
10. "Sparks" – 3:26
11. "Solitude" (Duke Ellington) – 3:22

== Personnel ==
- Matthew Shipp – piano
- Michael Bisio – bass
- Whit Dickey – drums
