= Harmonic Disorder =

Studio album by Matthew Shipp
- Released: 2009
- Recorded: August 2008
- Studio: Systems Two, New York City
- Genre: Jazz
- Length: 54:53
- Label: Thirsty Ear
- Producer: Matthew Shipp, Peter Gordon

Matthew Shipp chronology
Cosmic Suite (2008)	Harmonic Disorder (2009)	4D (2010)

Harmonic Disorder is an album by American jazz pianist Matthew Shipp recorded in 2008 and released on Thirsty Ear's Blue Series. It was the second recording by the trio with Joe Morris on bass and Whit Dickey on drums, following Piano Vortex. The album includes two jazz standards: "There Will Never Be Another You" and "Someday My Prince Will Come".

== Reception ==
Professional ratings
Review scores
Source	Rating
Allmusic	4/5 stars
Down Beat	4/5 stars

In his review for AllMusic, Thom Jurek states "The title Harmonic Disorder may read like this is one of Shipp's more intense outings, but the truth is, while it has wonderfully fiery moments, this is an intimate recording filled with new ideas, humor, depth, and warmth."

The Down Beat review by Peter Margasak notes that "While the pianist is in constant motion here, there’s a sense of patience and restraint that his early work lacked. He sounds more complete than ever before."

In a review for JazzTimes Mike Shanley says "Shipp again has shown his vast command of his instrument’s history, which he filters through his sharp perspective."

The All About Jazz review by John Sharpe states "The trio's wares here are spread over 14 tracks, with only three cuts breaking the five-minute barrier, in a program a shade under 55 minutes. With so much concentrated into small capsules like musical haikus, there is a lot to absorb and much pleasure to be had in doing so."

The PopMatters review by Will Layman states "All across Harmonic Disorder, Matthew Shipp is finding ways to blend his envelope-pushing with the sense of conventional order that reigned in piano trio music for a few decades."

== Track listing ==
All compositions by Matthew Shipp except as indicated

1. "GNG" – 4:35
2. "There Will Never Be Another You" (Mack Gordon, Harry Warren) – 3:15
3. "Harmonic Disorder" – 5:29
4. "Someday My Prince Will Come" (Frank Churchill, Larry Morey) – 3:52
5. "Mel Chi 2" – 1:56
6. "Mr. JM" – 4:33
7. "Mel Chi 1" – 1:48
8. "Roe" – 5:13
9. "Orb" – 3:16
10. "Compost" – 4:06
11. "Zo Number 2" – 6:18
12. "Quantum Wawes" – 4:54
13. "Light" – 3:01
14. "When the Curtain Falls on the Jazz Theatre" – 2:37

== Personnel ==
- Matthew Shipp – piano
- Joe Morris – bass
- Whit Dickey – drums
