= Night Logic =

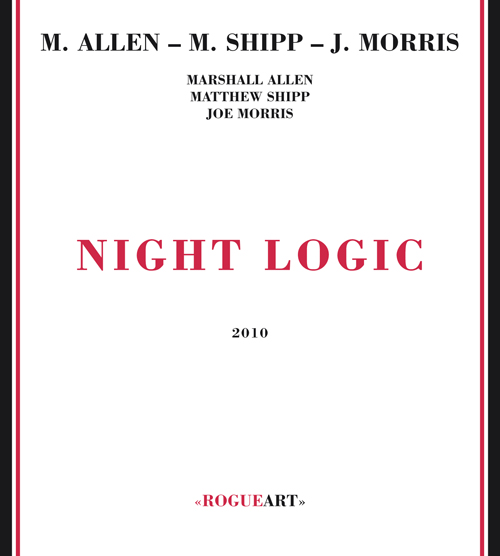

Live album by Marshall Allen, Matthew Shipp, and Joe Morris
- Released: 2010
- Recorded: July 26, 2010
- Venue: Roulette, New York City
- Genre: Free jazz
- Length: 1:10:29
- Label: RogueArt; ROG-0028
- Producer: Michel Dorbon

Marshall Allen chronology
Cosmic Tsunami (2005)	Night Logic (2010)	Vibrations of the Day (2011)

Night Logic is a live album by saxophonist Marshall Allen, pianist Matthew Shipp, and bassist Joe Morris. It was recorded on July 26, 2010, at Roulette in New York City, and was released later that year by RogueArt.

== Reception ==
Professional ratings
Review scores
Source	Rating
Tom Hull – on the Web	B+
The Free Jazz Collective	3.5/5 stars

In a review for JazzTimes, Lyn Horton wrote: "each musician contribut[es] to the dynamic that moves the music through an amazing gravity-less space to produce sound that dances with the light... The transitions from one track to another are invisible in keeping with the album's primary concept. The listener's awareness is fundamental to hearing the instrumental changes, the responsiveness of one musician to the other as each plays into earshot and falls away into a distant proximity."

A writer for The Free Jazz Collective stated: "the music is intimate and expansive and lyrical like we've come to appreciate from especially Matthew Shipp." However, they disliked Allen's use of the "electronic valve instrument" and its "awful electronics, full of bleeps and squeaks."

Stephen Mejias of Stereophile called the album "a thrilling release from an especially fiery jazz trio," and praised the track titled "New Age for the Milk Sea Nightmare," commenting: "silences in this music were stark, detail was delicious, and the power with which Shipp pounds his keys, Allen blows his sax, and Morris runs up and down his bass was so staggering that... when the trio reaches a chaotic climax, it was almost too much to endure."

Writing for JazzWord, Ken Waxman described the album as "more like a cozy song-swap around the campfire by a trio of equals than an intergenerational showdown or torch passing," and remarked: " Without compromising any of the players' exploratory impulses, consonant interludes trump disharmony with the musical result as satisfying as it is high class. Depending on the time frame all of this might not have unrolled within night logic, but it was the right logic for this CD."

== Track listing ==
Composed by Joe Morris, Marshall Allen, and Matthew Shipp.

1. "Ark of Harmonic Covenant" – 5:41
2. "Bow in the Cloud" – 8:05
3. "Night Logic" – 8:04
4. "Heart Aura" – 4:11
5. "Star Dust Splatter" – 9:41
6. "Cosmic Hammer" – 6:27
7. "Particle Physics" – 7:53
8. "Harmonic Quanta" – 8:11
9. "New Age for the Milk Sea Nightmare" – 9:45
10. "Res X" – 2:07

== Personnel ==
- Marshall Allen – alto saxophone, flute, electronic valve instrument [EVI]
- Matthew Shipp – piano
- Joe Morris – double bass
