= Our Lady of the Flowers (album) =

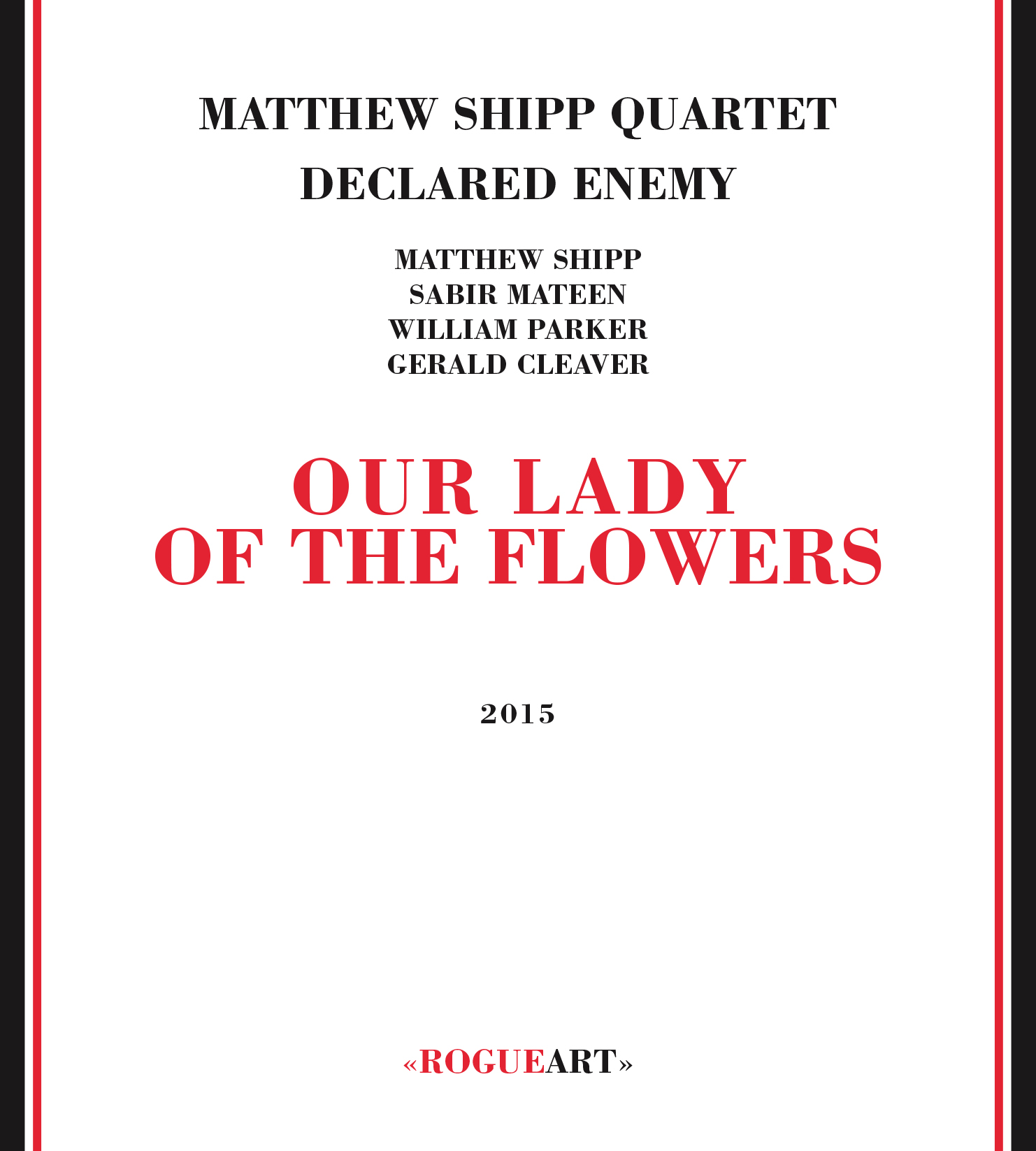

Studio album by Matthew Shipp
- Released: 2015
- Recorded: June 13, 2013
- Studio: Park West Studio, Brooklyn
- Genre: Jazz
- Length: 68:56
- Label: RogueArt
- Producer: Michel Dorbon

Matthew Shipp chronology
The Gospel According to Matthew & Michael (2015)	Our Lady of the Flowers (2015)	The Conduct of Jazz (2015)

Our Lady of the Flowers is an album by American jazz pianist Matthew Shipp, which was recorded in 2013 and released on the French RogueArt label. The album is named after the novel by French writer Jean Genet. It was the second disc by Shipp's Declared Enemy, the quartet he assembled for Salute to 100001 Stars with reedist Sabir Mateen, bassist William Parker and drummer Gerald Cleaver.

== Reception ==
The All About Jazz review by John Sharpe states "Shipp propounds his utterly distinctive style, with nagging motifs prominent, though he reins in his customary explosions."

== Track listing ==
All compositions by Matthew Shipp

1. "Atomic Note" – 7:03
2. "New Tension" – 5:18
3. "A Different Plane" – 7:38
4. "From the Beyond" – 8:27
5. "Silence Blooms" – 4:24
6. "Irrational" – 6:46
7. "Our Lady of the Flowers" – 11:03
8. "Gasp" – 7:41
9. "Cosmic Joke" – 8:56

== Personnel ==
- Matthew Shipp – piano
- Sabir Mateen – tenor sax, clarinet
- William Parker – double bass
- Gerald Cleaver – drums
