= Elastic Aspects =

Studio album by Matthew Shipp
- Released: 2012
- Recorded: July 8, 2011
- Studio: Systems Two, New York City
- Genre: Jazz
- Length: 48:44
- Label: Thirsty Ear
- Producer: Peter Gordon

Matthew Shipp chronology
Broken Partials (2011)	Elastic Aspects (2012)	Floating Ice (2012)

Elastic Aspects is an album by American jazz pianist Matthew Shipp recorded in 2011 and released on Thirsty Ear's Blue Series. It was the debut studio recording by the trio with Michael Bisio on bass and Whit Dickey on drums, following a live performance included in Art of the Improviser.

== Reception ==
Professional ratings
Review scores
Source	Rating
Down Beat	4/5 stars

In a review for JazzTimes Mike Shanley notes that "His playing here, and especially on the solo tracks, has a lyrical, delicate quality that should surprise anyone expecting more familiar avant-garde moves, like heavy thunder from the bottom of the keyboard."

The All About Jazz review by John Sharpe states "Shipp sounds like no-one else, with a style characterized by abrupt contrasts of crystalline delicacy rubbing shoulders with dissonant depth charges and insistent circular motifs."

The Down Beat review by Bill Meyer says that "Elastic Aspects can be seen as a companion piece to its predecessor in the way that it very explicitly breaks down the components of his trio music and isolates how they interact."

== Track listing ==
All compositions by Matthew Shipp

1. "Alternative Aspects" – 2:19
2. "Aspects" – 0:27
3. "Psychic Counterpart" – 4:47
4. "Frame Focus" – 3:52
5. "Flow Chart" – 1:30
6. "Mute Voice" – 3:12
7. "Explosive Aspects" – 3:19
8. "Raw Materials" – 5:30
9. "Rainforest" – 5:08
10. "Stage 10" – 3:12
11. "Dimension" – 3:24
12. "Elastic Aspects" – 4:30
13. "Elastic Eye" – 7:36

== Personnel ==
- Matthew Shipp – piano
- Michael Bisio – bass
- Whit Dickey – drums
