= Matthew Shipp =

American pianist, composer, and bandleader (born 1960)

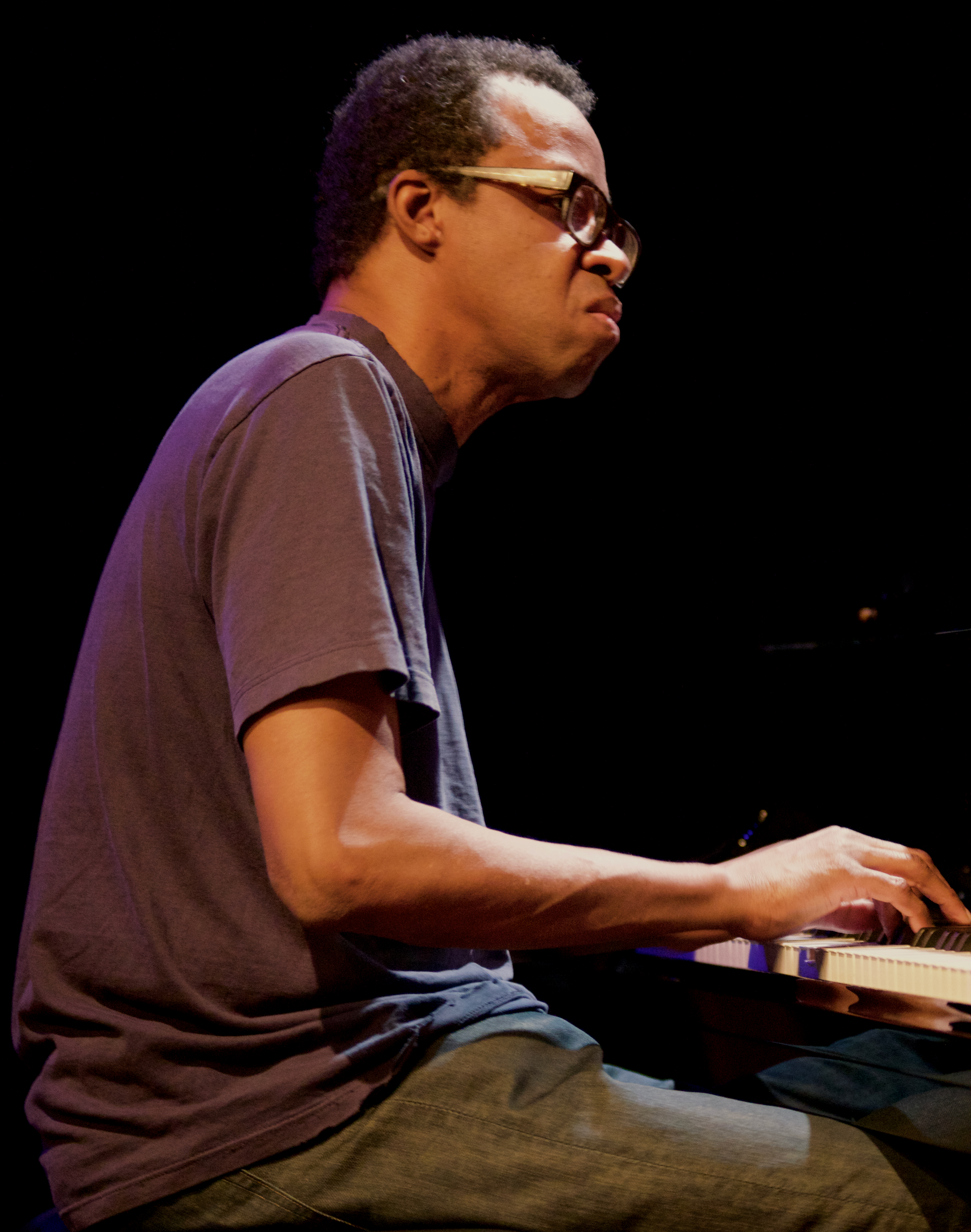
- Shipp performing in Amsterdam, 2016

Background information
- Born: December 7, 1960 (age 65); Wilmington, Delaware, U.S.
- Genres: Free jazz; avant-garde jazz; free improvisation; post-bop
- Occupation: Musician
- Instrument: Piano
- Years active: 1987–present
- Labels: Thirsty Ear; FMP; No More; hatOLOGY; RogueArt; ESP-Disk'; AUM Fidelity
- Website: matthewshippjazzpianist.blogspot.com

Matthew Shipp (born December 7, 1960) is an American avant-garde jazz pianist, composer, and bandleader.

== Early life and education ==
Shipp was raised in Wilmington, Delaware. His mother was a friend of trumpeter Clifford Brown.

He began playing piano at five years old. Shipp was strongly attracted to jazz, but also played in rock groups while in high school.

Shipp attended the University of Delaware for "a couple years" before dropping out. He opted instead to live with his parents and focus on practicing, though he frequently traveled to Philadelphia to pick up gigs as a cocktail pianist and to study with Dennis Sandole, who Shipp has cited as playing an important role in his development.

He later spent a year at the New England Conservatory of Music, where he studied with saxophonist and composer Joe Maneri, but again dropped out without completing a degree.

== Career ==
Shipp moved to New York in 1984 and has been very active since the early 1990s, appearing on dozens of albums as a leader, sideman, or producer. (Before making a living playing music, Shipp worked in a bookshop as an assistant manager. He was fired, threw some books at his boss, and decided he would not look for a day job anymore.)

He was initially most active in free jazz but has since branched out, particularly exploring music that touches on contemporary classical, hip-hop, and electronica. Earlier in his career, Shipp was compared to some of his predecessors in the jazz piano pantheon, but has since been recognized as a complete stylistic innovator on the piano, with AllMusic referring to his "unique, instantly recognizable style", and Larry Blumenfeld in Jazziz magazine referring to Shipp as "stunning in originality" and to his album 4D as "further proof of his idiosyncratic genius".

Shipp has also been celebrated by a wide range of artists: David Bowie had praised his work (specifically "Rocket Shipp" from the album Nu Bop), and Thurston Moore, who first saw him perform in 1990, has complimented his cross-genre appeal: "I see the same people showing up for Matthew's gigs as for Merzbow". (As a member of the David S. Ware Quartet, Shipp has opened for Sonic Youth.) Shipp has also been noted for his association with punk-rock icon Henry Rollins, who released several of Shipp's records on his 2.13.61 imprint. In 2010, Rollins wrote, "Matthew Shipp and his work have fascinated me since I first heard him many years ago. His originality and approach sometimes stretches the limits of what is considered Jazz music yet at the same time, describes perfectly the fierce freedom of it. ... Matthew is not only a brilliant Jazz pianist, he is a true artist and visionary." In the early 1990s Shipp also befriended Chan Marshall (a.k.a. Cat Power), then his next-door neighbor.

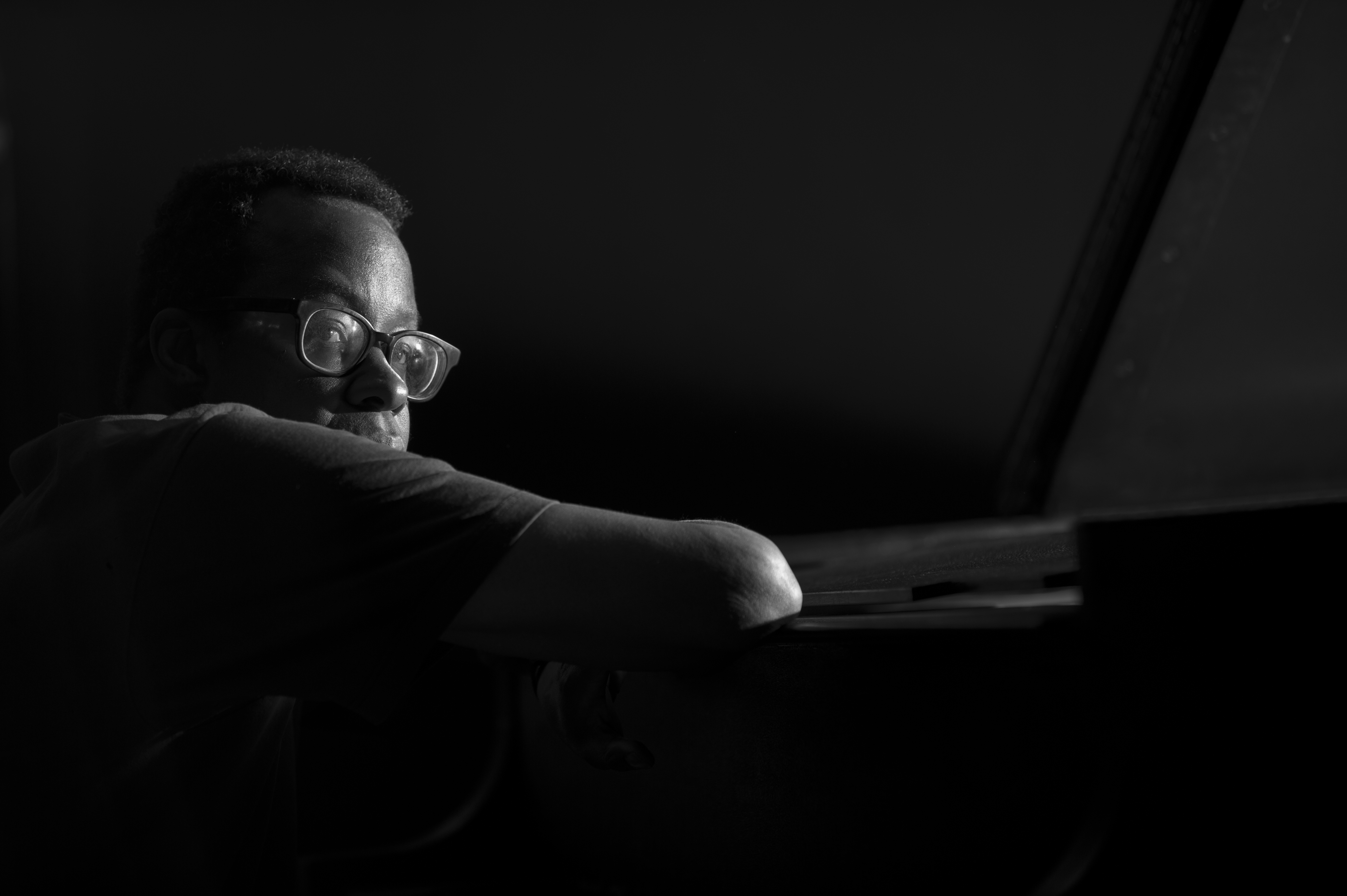
Shipp in Buffalo, New York, 2012

One of the first people Shipp sought out upon arriving in New York was William Parker, whom he knew from his recordings with Cecil Taylor; Parker later recommended Shipp for saxophonist David S. Ware's quartet, alongside Parker himself and a series of drummers (Marc Edwards, Susie Ibarra, Guillermo E. Brown, and Whit Dickey). As a member of Ware's quartet, Shipp recorded albums for Homestead (Cryptology and DAO), Thirsty Ear (Threads, Live in the World, and BalladWare), AUM Fidelity (the label's first release, Wisdom of Uncertainty, as well as Corridors & Parallels, Freedom Suite, and Renunciation), Silkheart (Great Bliss, Vol. 1 Great Bliss, Vol. 2, and Oblations and Blessings), Columbia (Go See the World and Surrendered), and DIW (Flight of I, Third Ear Recitation, Earthquation, and Godspelized).

In addition, the rhythm section of Shipp, Parker, and Brown recorded Ware compositions without Ware in 2003, released by Splasc(h) Records as The Trio Plays Ware, and Shipp and Ware performed as a duo, recorded in concert and released by AUM Fidelity as Live in Sant'Anna Arresi, 2004. In 2001, Gary Giddins wrote for The Village Voice that "The David S. Ware Quartet is the best small band in jazz today". After Ware's death, Shipp wrote, "Some have compared our unit to the classic Coltrane quartet, but the members of our group all brought something to the table that only someone playing now could bring—resulting in a gestalt that is of its time and does not look back. When free jazz seemed like a spent force, he brought something new—and greatly beautiful—to it."

Shipp was also a member of Roscoe Mitchell's Note Factory, which Shipp said "could be seen as an extension of some post-Coltrane concepts, but in Roscoe's hands it is extended technique with multiple pulses", noting "[Mitchell's] insistence at all times of transcending cliché".

Shipp has recorded or performed with many other musicians, including High Priest and Beans of Antipop Consortium, Michael Bisio, Daniel Carter, DJ Spooky, El-P, Mat Maneri, Joe Morris, Ivo Perelman, Mat Walerian, Allen Lowe, and Chad Fowler. He has also co-led the group East Axis, with bassist Kevin Ray, drummer Gerald Cleaver, and saxophonists Allen Lowe (first album) and Scott Robinson (second album).

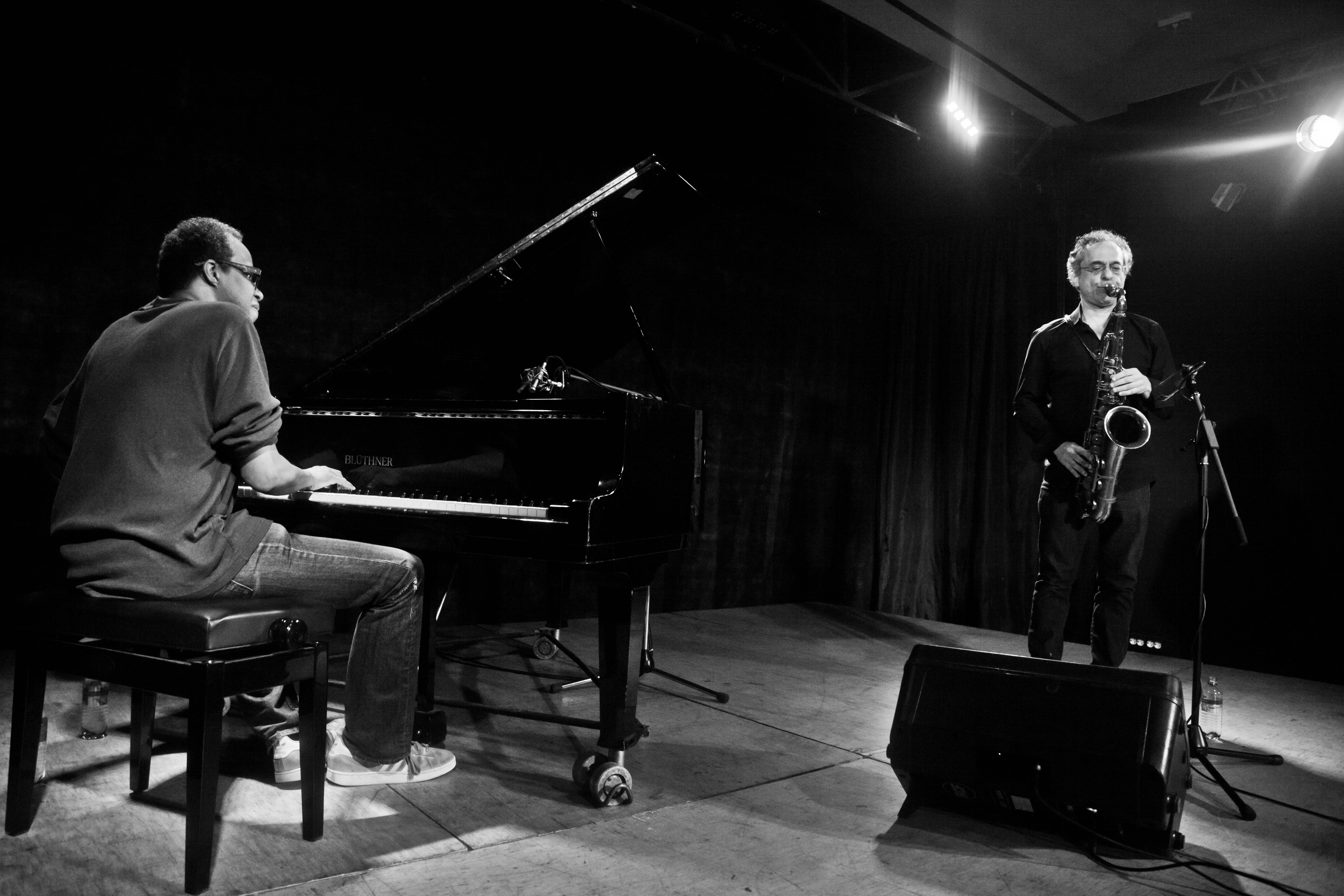
Shipp with Ivo Perelman in Moscow, 2017

The New York Times has noted Shipp's curatorial work for Thirsty Ear Recordings as "one of the label's chief consultants and most prolific artists". Shipp's own releases on the label include 2011's double-disc album, entitled Art of the Improviser; AllMusic called the work a "testament to Shipp's achievements, yet it is also a continuation of the discovery in his developmental musical language" and the Chicago Tribune called the project "monumental" and "galvanic as ever". Thirsty Ear also released Shipp's 2013 solo record Piano Sutras, which PopMatters described as "the kind of record we talk about and play for each other decades later ... music that frames up a whole history: of an artist, of listeners, of the artists who formed the history of the art form, of the culture and time that allowed this art to flourish". This was followed by 2015's The Conduct of Jazz, the first album by Shipp's trio with bassist Michael Bisio and drummer Newman Taylor Baker.

Shipp's work with the France-based RogueArt imprint began with the 2006 album Salute to 100001 Stars: A Tribute to Jean Genet by the group Declared Enemy (Sabir Mateen, Shipp, William Parker, and Gerald Cleaver). From 2006 to 2013, Shipp appeared on five albums released through RogueArt, one of which (Un Piano) billed Shipp as leader; from 2015 to 2022, the label put out six more albums with Shipp as leader, and another nine on which he was co-billed with, among others, Mark Helias, Nate Wooley, William Parker, Mat Maneri, John Butcher, and Evan Parker. Shipp's work on RogueArt, along with biographical material and placement of Shipp's artistic evolution within the context of the downtown Manhattan avant-garde jazz scene, is the subject of music journalist Clifford Allen's 2023 book Singularity Codex: Matthew Shipp on RogueArt; the Burning Ambulance review by Todd Manning declares that "Singularity Codex examines so many aspects of [Shipp's] life and the scene around him that it is not only indispensable to anyone trying to come to a deeper understanding of his work but also for those wanting to study the avant-garde jazz scene of New York City’s Lower East Side."

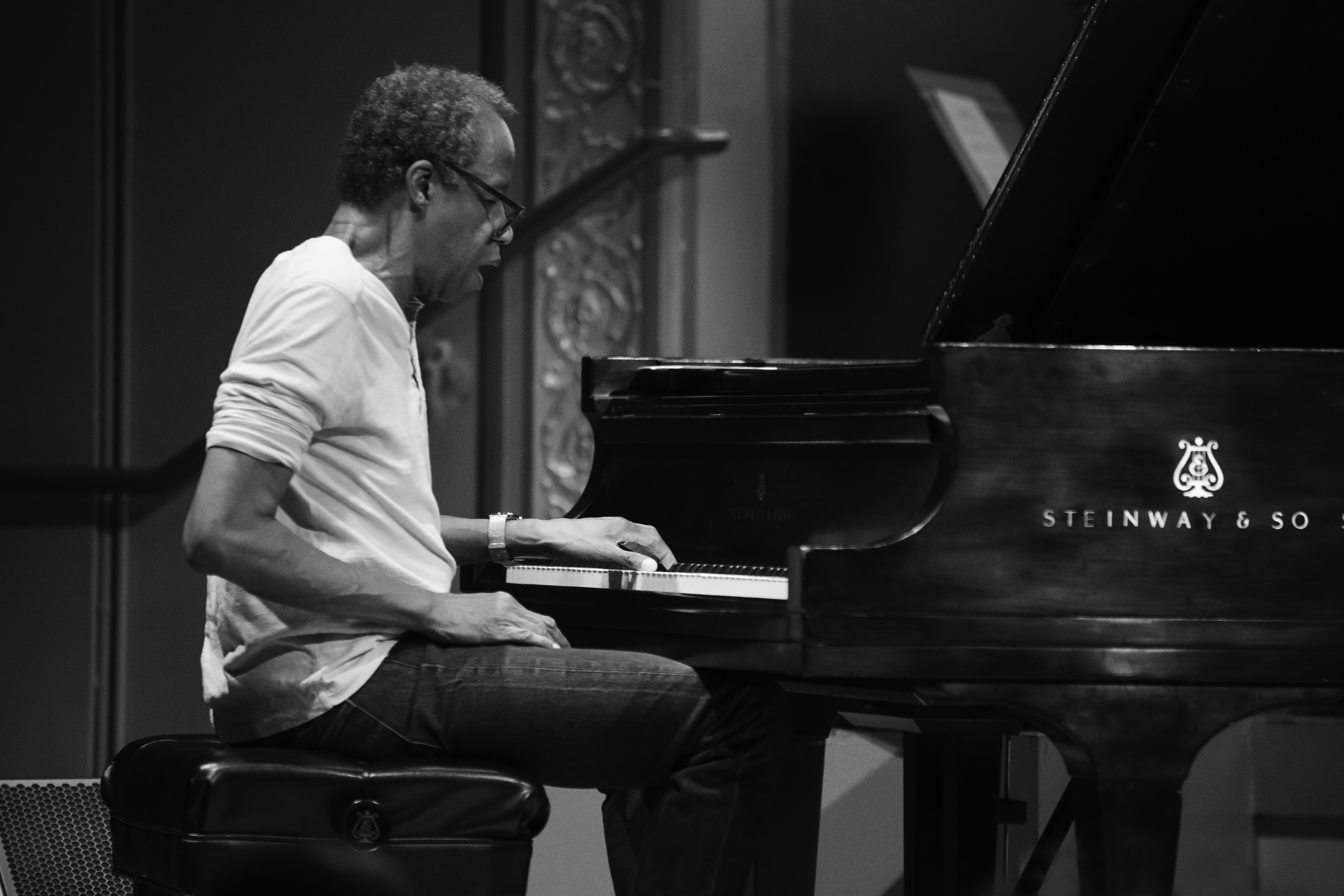
Shipp at the Vision Festival, hosted by Arts for Art in New York City, 2024

Shipp began working with ESP-Disk' with the Shipp/Mat Walerian duo album Live at Okuden, billed as The Uppercut. Issued in 2015, it was the last new release approved by ESP-Disk's founder Bernard Stollman. All four of Walerian's albums with Shipp have been released on ESP-Disk'. Shipp's first ESP albums as leader were a quartet album, Sonic Fiction, and a solo album, Zer0, both issued in 2018. After that, he released several albums by his trio with Michael Bisio and Newman Taylor Baker: Signature, The Unidentifiable, World Construct, and New Concepts in Piano Trio Jazz. World Construct was called "a career-defining album" and awarded five stars by critic Mike Hobart in the Financial Times, while New Concepts in Piano Trio Jazz was called by Tony Dudley-Evans of the London Jazz Times "an album of great beauty that is state of the art in terms of the possibilities of the jazz piano trio." In 2022 a duo album by Shipp and Ivo Perelman, Fruition, was released by ESP, with NPR's Nate Chinen stating in his review, "The freeform alchemy between Brazilian saxophonist Ivo Perelman and American pianist Matthew Shipp is by now a proven fact: rarely do two musicians achieve a higher flow state in real time."

In 2020, longtime Shipp collaborator Whit Dickey started a label called Tao Forms; as of January 2023, the label had released two Shipp albums, The Piano Equation and Codebreaker, both solo releases, and four further albums on which he collaborates. That same year, one of Shipp's most systematized statements, "Black Mystery School Pianists", was published on the website of New Music USA. Five years later, when this essay found its way into print in the book Black Mystery School Pianists and Other Writings (a collection of Shipp's essays plus a transcribed lecture), Stewart Smith, reviewing the book in The Wire, called the titular essay "a thought-provoking counter-history to the official accounts of the jazz academy." In 2026, Black Mystery School Pianists and Other Writings received a 2026 American Book Award from the Before Columbus Foundation.

== Discography ==
=== As leader/co-leader ===
Release year	Title	Label	Personnel/Notes
1988	Sonic Explorations	Cadence Jazz	Duo with Rob Brown (alto sax)
1992	Points	Silkheart	Quartet with Rob Brown (alto sax), William Parker (bass), Whit Dickey (drums)
1992	Circular Temple	Quinton	Trio with William Parker (bass), Whit Dickey (drums)
1994	Zo	Rise	Duo with William Parker (bass)
1995	Critical Mass	2.13.61	Quartet with Mat Maneri (violin), William Parker (bass), Whit Dickey (drums)
1996	Symbol Systems	No More	Solo piano
1996	Prism	Brinkman	Trio with William Parker (bass), Whit Dickey (drums)
1996	2-Z	2.13.61	Duo with Roscoe Mitchell (saxophones)
1997	The Flow of X	2.13.61	Quartet with Mat Maneri (violin), William Parker (bass), Whit Dickey (drums)
1997	Before the World	FMP	Solo piano
1997	By the Law of Music	hatHUT	String Trio with Mat Maneri (violin), William Parker (bass)
1997	Thesis	hatOLOGY	Duo with Joe Morris (guitar)
1998	The Multiplication Table	hatOLOGY	Trio with William Parker (bass), Susie Ibarra (drums)
1998	Strata	hatOLOGY	Quartet with Roy Campbell (trumpet), Daniel Carter (saxophones, flute, trumpet), William Parker (bass)
1999	DNA	Thirsty Ear	Duo with William Parker (bass)
1999	Magnetism	Bleu Regard	Solo, duo and trio performances with Rob Brown (alto sax, flute), William Parker (bass)
2000	Gravitational Systems	hatOLOGY	Duo with Mat Maneri (violin)
2000	Pastoral Composure	Thirsty Ear	Quartet with Roy Campbell (trumpet), William Parker (bass), Gerald Cleaver (drums)
2001	Expansion, Power, Release	hatOLOGY	String Trio with Mat Maneri (violin), William Parker (bass)
2001	New Orbit	Thirsty Ear	Quartet with Wadada Leo Smith (trumpet), William Parker (bass), Gerald Cleaver (drums)
2002	Songs	Splasc(h)	Solo piano
2002	Nu Bop	Thirsty Ear	With William Parker (bass), Guillermo E. Brown (drums), Daniel Carter (sax, flute), FLAM (synths, programming)
2003	Equilibrium	Thirsty Ear	With William Parker (bass), Gerald Cleaver (drums), Khan Jamal (vibes), FLAM (synths, programming)
2003	Antipop vs. Matthew Shipp	Thirsty Ear	
2003	The GoodandEvil Sessions	Thirsty Ear	With Roy Campbell (trumpet), Alex Lodico, Josh Roseman (trombone), Miso (turntables), William Parker (bass), Danny Blume (drums, guitar, programming), Chris Kelly (drums, programming)
2003	The Sorcerer Sessions	Thirsty Ear	With Evan Ziporyn (clarinets), William Parker (bass), Gerald Cleaver (drums), FLAM (synths, programming), Daniel Bernard Roumain (violin)
2004	The Trio Plays Ware	Splasc(h)	Trio with William Parker (bass), Guillermo E. Brown (drums)
2004	Harmony and Abyss	Thirsty Ear	With William Parker (bass), Gerald Cleaver (drums), FLAM (synths, drums programming)
2005	In Finland	Cadence Jazz	Trio with Joe McPhee (soprano sax, trumpet), Dominic Duval (bass)
2005	One	Thirsty Ear	Solo piano
2006	Phenomena of Interference	Hopscotch	With Steve Dalachinsky
2006	Salute to 100001 Stars – A Tribute to Jean Genet	RogueArt	As the band Declared Enemy; with Sabir Mateen (alto sax, flute, clarinet), William Parker (bass), Gerald Cleaver (drums), Denis Lavant (spoken words)
2007	Piano Vortex	Thirsty Ear	Trio with Joe Morris (bass), Whit Dickey (drums)
2007	Abbey Road Duos	Treader	Duo with Evan Parker (tenor sax, soprano sax)
2008	Right Hemisphere	RogueArt	As the band Right Hemisphere; quartet with Rob Brown (alto sax), Joe Morris (bass), Whit Dickey (drums)
2008	Un Piano	RogueArt	Solo piano
2008	Cosmic Suite	Not Two	Quartet with Daniel Carter (reeds), Joe Morris (bass), Whit Dickey (drums)
2009	Harmonic Disorder	Thirsty Ear	Trio with Joe Morris (bass), Whit Dickey (drums)
2010	4D	Thirsty Ear	Solo piano
2010	SAMA	Not Two	Duo with Sabir Mateen (reeds)
2010	Creation Out of Nothing (Live in Moscow)	SoLyd	Solo piano
2011	Night Logic	RogueArt	Trio with Marshall Allen (alto sax, flute, EVI), Joe Morris (bass)
2011	Art of the Improviser	Thirsty Ear	Solo piano and trio with Michael Bisio (bass), Whit Dickey (drums)
2011	SaMa Live in Moscow	SoLyd	Duo with Sabir Mateen (saxophone)
2011	Cosmic Lieder	AUM Fidelity	Duo with Darius Jones (alto sax)
2011	Broken Partials	Not Two	Duo with Joe Morris (bass)
2012	Elastic Aspects	Thirsty Ear	Trio with Michael Bisio (bass), Whit Dickey (drums)
2012	Floating Ice	Relative Pitch	Duo with Michael Bisio (bass)
2013	Rex, Wrecks & XXX	RogueArt	Duo with Evan Parker (tenor sax)
2013	Piano Sutras	Thirsty Ear	Solo piano
2014	Root of Things	Relative Pitch	Trio with Michael Bisio (bass), Whit Dickey (drums)
2014	The Darkseid Recital	AUM Fidelity	Duo with Darius Jones (alto sax)
2014	I've Been to Many Places	Thirsty Ear	Solo piano
2015	To Duke	RogueArt	Trio with Michael Bisio (bass), Whit Dickey (drums)
2015	Live at Okuden	ESP-Disk	As the band The Uppercut; with Mat Walerian (reeds)
2015	The Gospel According to Matthew & Michael	Relative Pitch	Chamber Ensemble; trio with Mat Maneri (viola), Michael Bisio (bass)
2015	Our Lady of the Flowers	RogueArt	As the band Declared Enemy; quartet with Sabir Mateen (tenor sax, clarinet), William Parker (bass), Gerald Cleaver (drums)
2015	The Conduct of Jazz	Thirsty Ear	Trio with Michael Bisio (bass), Newman Taylor Baker (drums)
2016	Live in Seattle	Arena Music Promotion	Duo with Michael Bisio (bass)
2016	Live at Okuden	ESP-Disk'	As the band Jungle; with Mat Walerian (reeds), Hamid Drake (drums)
2016	Cactus	Northern Spy	Duo with Bobby Kapp (drums)
2017	Piano Song	Thirsty Ear	Trio with Michael Bisio (bass), Newman Taylor Baker (drums)
2017	Invisible Touch At Taktlos Zürich	hatOLOGY	Solo piano
2017	This Is Beautiful Because We Are Beautiful People	ESP-Disk'	As the band Toxic; with Mat Walerian (reeds), William Parker (bass, shakuhachi)
2017	Not Bound	Fortune	Quartet with Daniel Carter (reeds), Michael Bisio (bass), Whit Dickey (drums)
2018	Accelerated Projection	RogueArt	Duo with Roscoe Mitchell (tenor & soprano sax, flute)
2018	Zero	ESP-Disk'	Solo piano
2018	Sonic Fiction	ESP-Disk'	Quartet with Mat Walerian (reeds), Michael Bisio (bass), Whit Dickey (drums)
2019	Signature	ESP-Disk'	Trio with Michael Bisio, Newman Taylor Baker
2020	The Unidentifiable	ESP-Disk'	Trio with Michael Bisio, Newman Taylor Baker
2020	The Piano Equation	TAO Forms	Solo piano
2020	The Reward	RogueArt	Solo piano
2021	Codebreaker	TAO Forms	Solo piano
2021	Cool With That	ESP-Disk'	As East Axis; with Gerald Cleaver, Kevin Ray, Allen Lowe
2021	Village Mothership	TAO Forms	Trio with Whit Dickey, William Parker
2022	World Construct	ESP-Disk'	Trio with Michael Bisio, Newman Taylor Baker
2023	No Subject	Mack Avenue- Brother Mister	As East Axis; with Gerald Cleaver, Kevin Ray, Scott Robinson
2024	New Concepts in Piano Trio Jazz	ESP-Disk'	Trio with Michael Bisio, Newman Taylor Baker
2025	The Cosmic Piano	Cantaloupe Music	Solo piano

=== As sideman ===
Release year	Leader	Title	Label
1991	David S. Ware	Great Bliss, Vol. 1	Silkheart
1991	David S. Ware	Great Bliss, Vol. 2	Silkheart
1992	David S. Ware	Flight of I	DIW/Columbia
1993	David S. Ware	Third Ear Recitation	DIW
1994	David S. Ware	Earthquation	DIW
1995	David S. Ware	Cryptology	Homestead
1996	David S. Ware	Oblations and Blessings	Silkheart
1996	David S. Ware	DAO	Homestead
1996	David S. Ware	Godspelized	DIW
1997	David S. Ware	Wisdom of Uncertainty	AUM Fidelity
1998	David S. Ware	Go See the World	Columbia
2000	David S. Ware	Surrendered	Columbia
2001	David S. Ware	Corridors & Parallels	AUM Fidelity
2002	David S. Ware	Freedom Suite	AUM Fidelity
2003	David S. Ware	Threads	Thirsty Ear
2005	David S. Ware	Live in the World	Thirsty Ear
2006	David S. Ware	BalladWare	Thirsty Ear
2007	David S. Ware	Renunciation	AUM Fidelity
2009	David S. Ware	Live in Vilnius	NoBusiness
2016	David S. Ware	Live in Sant'Anna Arresi, 2004	AUM Fidelity
1997	Rob Brown	Blink of an Eye	No More
1998	Mat Maneri	So What?	hatOLOGY
2001	Whit Dickey	Life Cycle	AUM Fidelity
2017	Whit Dickey	Vessel in Orbit	AUM Fidelity
2004	El-P	High Water	Thirsty Ear
1992	Roscoe Mitchell	This Dance Is for Steve McCall	Black Saint
1999	Roscoe Mitchell	Nine to Get Ready	ECM
2003	Roscoe Mitchell	The Bad Guys	Around Jazz
2014	Jemeel Moondoc	The Zookeeper's House	Relative Pitch
2018	Jemeel Moondoc	The Astral Revelations	RogueArt
1996	Joe Morris	Elsewhere	Homestead
2000	Other Dimensions In Music	Time Is of the Essence Is Beyond Time	Homestead
1996	Ivo Perelman	Cama de Terra	Homestead
1997	Ivo Perelman	Bendito of Santa Cruz	Cadence Jazz
1999	Ivo Perelman	Brazilian Watercolour	Leo
2011	Ivo Perelman	The Hour of the Star	Leo
2012	Ivo Perelman	The Foreign Legion	Leo
2012	Ivo Perelman	The Clairvoyant	Leo
2012	Ivo Perelman	The Gift	Leo
2013	Ivo Perelman	The Edge	Leo
2013	Ivo Perelman	The Art of the Duet, Volume One	Leo
2013	Ivo Perelman	Enigma	Leo
2013	Ivo Perelman	Serendipity	Leo
2013	Ivo Perelman	A Violent Dose of Anything	Leo
2014	Ivo Perelman	Book of Sound	Leo
2014	Ivo Perelman	The Other Edge	Leo
2015	Ivo Perelman	Callas	Leo
2015	Ivo Perelman	Butterfly Whispers	Leo
2015	Ivo Perelman	Complementary Colors	Leo
2016	Ivo Perelman	Soul	Leo
2016	Ivo Perelman	Corpo	Leo
2016	Ivo Perelman	The Art Of The Improv Trio Volume 3	Leo
2017	Ivo Perelman	The Art Of Perelman-Shipp Volume 1: Titan	Leo
2017	Ivo Perelman	The Art Of Perelman-Shipp Volume 2: Tarvos	Leo
2017	Ivo Perelman	The Art Of Perelman-Shipp Volume 3: Pandora	Leo
2017	Ivo Perelman	The Art Of Perelman-Shipp Volume 4: Hyperion	Leo
2017	Ivo Perelman	The Art Of Perelman-Shipp Volume 5: Rhea	Leo
2017	Ivo Perelman	The Art Of Perelman-Shipp Volume 6: Saturn	Leo
2017	Ivo Perelman	The Art Of Perelman-Shipp Volume 7: Dione	Leo
2017	Ivo Perelman	Live in Brussels	Leo
2017	Ivo Perelman	Live in Baltimore	Leo
2017	Ivo Perelman	Heptagon	Leo
2017	Ivo Perelman	Scalene	Leo
2017	Ivo Perelman	Philosopher's Stone	Leo
2018	Ivo Perelman	Oneness	Leo
2022	Ivo Perelman	Fruition	ESP-Disk'

== Bibliography ==
- Logos And Language: A Post-Jazz Metaphorical Dialogue (RogueArt, 2008) with Steve Dalachinsky
- Allen, Clifford: Singularity Codex. Matthew Shipp on RogueArt (210 pages, RogueArt, 2023)
- Black Mystery School Pianists and Other Writings (94 pages, Autonomedia, 2025)
