= Piano Song =

Studio album by Matthew Shipp Trio
- Released: 2017
- Recorded: April 5, 2016
- Studio: Park West, New York City
- Genre: Jazz
- Length: 58:33
- Label: Thirsty Ear
- Producer: Peter Gordon

Matthew Shipp chronology
Cactus (2016)	Piano Song (2017)

Piano Song is an album by the Matthew Shipp Trio, led by American jazz pianist Matthew Shipp, recorded in 2016 and released on Thirsty Ear's Blue Series. It was the second recording by his trio with Michael Bisio on bass and Newman Taylor Baker on drums.

== Reception ==
Professional ratings
Aggregate scores
Source	Rating
Metacritic	77/100
Review scores
Source	Rating
AllMusic	4/5 stars
Down Beat	4/5 stars

Response was positive, with Metacritic assigning the album an aggregate score of 77 out of 100 based on 4 critical reviews indicating "Generally favorable reviews".

In his review for AllMusic, Thom Jurek states "For those who haven't encountered him before, Piano Song is an excellent and accessible introduction that surrenders nothing in terms of creativity. For fans, this authoritative statement is a revelatory chapter from one of the most fascinating musicians since 1980s."

The All About Jazz review by Jakob Baekgaard notes "Piano Song feels like an entirely fresh take on the piano trio, a vibrant continuum of sounds that avoids the pitfalls of both mainstream and avant-garde music."

The Down Beat review by Peter Margasak says "This album may be saying goodbye to a particular partnership, but musically it feels like an exciting new beginning for one [of] the most preeminent pianists of the last three decades."

== Track listing ==
All compositions by Matthew Shipp

1. "Links" – 1:48
2. "Cosmopolitan" – 7:31
3. "Blue Desert" – 4:37
4. "Silence Of" – 5:32
5. "Flying Carpet" – 5:53
6. "Scrambled Brain" – 5:33
7. "Microwave" – 4:03
8. "Mind Space" – 4:47
9. "Void of Sea" – 3:34
10. "The Nature Of" – 5:16
11. "Gravity Point" – 5:27
12. "Piano Song" – 4:32

== Personnel ==
- Matthew Shipp – piano
- Michael Bisio – bass
- Newman Taylor Baker – drums
