= Right Hemisphere (album) =

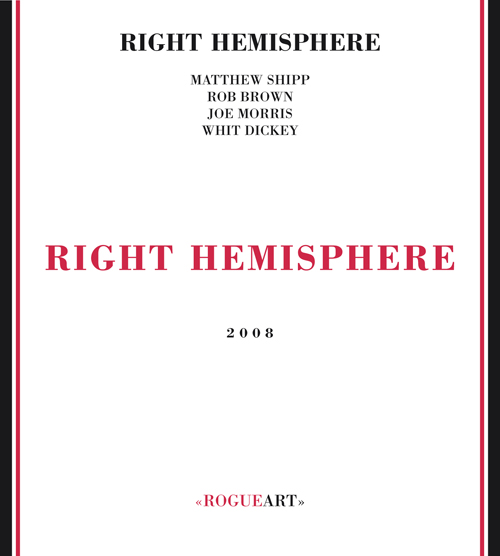

Studio album by Right Hemisphere
- Released: 2008
- Recorded: January 5, 2006
- Studio: Leon Lee Dorsey Studio, New York City
- Genre: Jazz
- Length: 54:22
- Label: RogueArt
- Producer: Michel Dorbon

Rob Brown chronology
Sounds (2007)	Right Hemisphere (2008)	Live in Chicago (2008)

Matthew Shipp chronology
Piano Vortex (2007)	Right Hemisphere (2008)	Un Piano (2008)

Right Hemisphere is the album by the free jazz collective quartet consisting of Rob Brown on alto sax, Matthew Shipp on piano, Joe Morris on bass and Whit Dickey on drums. It was recorded in 2006 and released on the French RogueArt label. Right Hemisphere has been in existence since 1984 when Shipp and Brown first arrived in New York. The group originally had as its drummer Frank Bambara and shortly after Dickey replaced him. The trio was joined by bassist William Parker and their first recording Points appeared in 1990 under Shipp's leadership.

== Reception ==
The All About Jazz review by Florence Wetzel states "The eleven songs explore a wide range of moods... And yet even when the emotions feel familiar, there's something deliciously elusive about this music; it never settles for easy answers or familiar aural territory."

== Track listing ==
All compositions by Shipp/Brown/Morris/Dickey except as indicated

1. "Right Hemisphere" – 3:22
2. "You Rang" – 4:31
3. "Bubbles" (Brown/Morris/Dickey) – 3:33
4. "Ice" – 3:39
5. "Hyperspace" – 2:12
6. "Dice" (Shipp/Morris/Dickey) – 5:14
7. "Incremental" – 5:45
8. "Falling In" (Brown/Morris/Dickey) – 5:59
9. "The Sweet Science" (Shipp) – 1:44
10. "Lava" – 8:41
11. "Red in Gray" – 9:06

== Personnel ==
- Matthew Shipp – piano
- Rob Brown – alto sax
- Joe Morris – bass
- Whit Dickey – drums
