= The Trio Plays Ware =

Studio album by Matthew Shipp
- Released: 2004
- Recorded: April 19, 2003
- Studios: The Studio, New York City
- Genre: Jazz
- Length: 51:55
- Label: Splasc(H)
- Producer: Matthew Shipp

Matthew Shipp chronology
The Sorcerer Sessions (2003)	The Trio Plays Ware (2004)	Harmony and Abyss (2004)

The Trio Plays Ware is an album by American jazz pianist Matthew Shipp performing music composed by saxophonist David S. Ware, which was recorded in 2003 and released on the Italian Splasc(H) label. The trio with Shipp, bassist William Parker and drummer Guillermo E. Brown was at the time of the recording the rhythm section of the David S. Ware Quartet.

== Reception ==
In a double review for All About Jazz, Jeff Stockton notes that "You keep waiting for Ware to burst in, but he doesn't, and you're left with Shipp's densely barometric piano, Parker's stirring contrabass and Brown's structural drumming."

== Track listing ==
All compositions by David S. Ware

1. "Manu's Ideal" – 5:31
2. "Godspelized" – 6:56
3. "Dinosauria" – 4:49
4. "Lexicon" – 8:28
5. "Reign of Peace" – 5:09
6. "Wisdom Through Time" – 4:26
7. "Dao Forms" – 8:33
8. "Mystic March" – 7:53

== Personnel ==
- Matthew Shipp - piano
- William Parker - bass
- Guillermo E. Brown - drums
