= Floating ice =

Floating ice may refer to:

- Drift ice, floating sea ice
- Floating Ice, a 2012 album by Michael Bisio

== See also ==
- Iceberg
