= Pastoral Composure =

Studio album by Matthew Shipp
- Released: 2000
- Recorded: January 6, 2000
- Studio: Seltzer Sound, New York City
- Genre: Jazz
- Length: 48:15
- Label: Thirsty Ear
- Producer: Matthew Shipp

Matthew Shipp chronology
Gravitational Systems (2000)	Pastoral Composure (2000)	Expansion, Power, Release (2001)

Pastoral Composure is an album by American jazz pianist Matthew Shipp, recorded in 2000 and released on Thirsty Ear. It was the first installment of the Blue Series, a collection of releases curated by Shipp. He leads a quartet with trumpeter Roy Campbell, bassist William Parker and drummer Gerald Cleaver. The album includes a version of Duke Ellington composition "Prelude to a Kiss" and a rendition of the French traditional song "Frère Jacques".

== Reception ==
Professional ratings
Review scores
Source	Rating
AllMusic	4.5/5 stars
The New Rolling Stone Album Guide	4/5 stars
The Penguin Guide to Jazz Recordings	3.5/4 stars

In her review for AllMusic, Joslyn Layne states: "one of Shipp's more accessible albums, making it great place to start for those interested in checking out this important modern jazz pianist." The Pitchfork review by Matt LeMay claims: "It's remarkably complex and musically proficient, yet instantly accessible, and a keeper in every respect."

== Track listing ==
All compositions by Matthew Shipp except as indicated

1. "Gesture" – 6:49
2. "Visions" – 7:56
3. "Prelude to a Kiss" (Duke Ellington) – 4:38
4. "Pastoral Composure" – 4:39
5. "Progression" – 5:33
6. "Frère Jacques" (Traditional) – 5:36
7. "Merge" – 5:46
8. "Inner Order" – 3:44
9. "XTU" – 3:34

== Personnel ==
- Matthew Shipp – piano
- Roy Campbell – trumpet, pocket trumpet, flugelhorn
- William Parker – bass
- Gerald Cleaver – drums
