= Corridors & Parallels =

Corridors and Parallels

Studio album by David S. Ware
- Released: September 18, 2001
- Recorded: February 26 & 27, 2001; Sorcerer Sound, New York City
- Genre: Jazz
- Length: 48:48
- Label: AUM Fidelity; AUM 019
- Producer: Steven Joerg

David S. Ware chronology
Surrendered (2000)	Corridors and Parallels (2001)	Live in the Netherlands (2001)

Corridors and Parallels is an album by American jazz saxophonist David S. Ware which was recorded in 2001 and released on the AUM Fidelity label.

== Reception ==
Professional ratings
Review scores
Source	Rating
AllMusic	4.5/5 stars
Pitchfork Media	6.2/10 stars
The Guardian	3/5 stars
The Penguin Guide to Jazz Recordings	3.5/4 stars

Ware's move to more electronic textures divided the critics. In his review for AllMusic, Sam Samuelson called it "his most inspired record thus far" and said "This recording is not to be missed". Pitchfork's Christopher Dare was less impressed, stating "I'll leave it to the listener to decide whether the good half of an album makes it worth the purchase. Unfortunately, the other half weakens all its supports with some tacky choices regarding sound palettes and dynamics-- deconstruction in the least clever sense". The Guardian's John Fordham noted "Much of it is as fiercely remorseless as you'd expect. But there are also Afro-funk grooves as tight as a club disc, endless tenor notes against gongs and bells, sci-fi electronic bleepings and twitterings, and an awe-inspiring tribute to Ware's late mother that is one of the most impassioned free-jazz tenor soliloquies of recent times". All About Jazz noted "This new effort is a fine record: a living document of a group in flux, and a stand-alone work of art. It will be quite revealing to hear what happens next after such a dramatic change. This is living, breathing music". Daniel Piotrowski wrote in JazzTimes that "Sometimes Corridors feels like an experiment in progress more than a cohesive idea, but it is still one of his most exciting and intriguing recordings".

The Wire placed the album in their "50 Records Of The Year 2001" list.

== Track listing ==
All compositions by David S. Ware except as indicated

1. "Untitled" - 1:20
2. "Straight Track" - 10:03
3. "Jazz Fi-Sci" - 4:22
4. "Superimposed" - 5:58
5. "Sound-a-Bye" - 3:09
6. "Untitled" - 0:37
7. "Corridors & Parallels" (Matthew Shipp, David S. Ware) - 9:00
8. "Somewhere" - 3:11
9. "Spaces Embraces" - 3:18
10. "Mother May You Rest in Bliss" - 6:08
11. "Untitled" - 1:48

== Personnel ==
- David S. Ware – tenor saxophone
- Matthew Shipp – synthesizer
- William Parker – bass
- Guillermo E. Brown – drums
