= Sama (Matthew Shipp and Sabir Mateen album) =

SAMA

Studio album by Matthew Shipp & Sabir Mateen
- Released: 2010
- Recorded: March 10, 2009
- Studio: Roulette, New York City
- Genre: Jazz
- Length: 49:35
- Label: Not Two
- Producer: Marek Winiarski

Matthew Shipp chronology
4D (2010)	SAMA (2010)	Creation Out of Nothing (2010)

Sabir Mateen chronology
Urdla XXX (2010)	SAMA (2010)	SaMa Live in Moscow (2011)

Sama is an album by American jazz pianist Matthew Shipp and reedist Sabir Mateen, which was recorded in 2009 and released on the Polish Not Two label. This eight part suite of completely improvised music was the first collaboration between Shipp and Mateen.

== Reception ==
In a double review for All About Jazz, John Sharpe notes that "Mateen forgoes his regular reed arsenal to concentrate solely on clarinet. Perhaps the chamber instrumentation exerted an influence on both men's thinking as Shipp somewhat reins in his customary hammered repetitions and motifs, emphasizing his brooding romantic side."

== Track listing ==
All compositions by Sabir Mateen & Matthew Shipp

1. "Sama One" - 8:26
2. "Sama Two" - 5:56
3. "Sama Three" - 3:55
4. "Sama Four" - 7:37
5. "Sama Five" - 8:47
6. "Sama Six" - 4:34
7. "Sama Seven" - 6:16
8. "Sama Eight" - 4:04

== Personnel ==
- Matthew Shipp – piano
- Sabir Mateen – clarinet
