= Life Cycle (Whit Dickey album) =

Studio album by Whit Dickey
- Released: 2001
- Recorded: September 15, 2000
- Studio: Hillside Sound, Englewood, New Jersey
- Genre: Jazz
- Length: 41:44
- Label: Aum Fidelity
- Producer: Whit Dickey

Whit Dickey chronology
Big Top (2000)	Life Cycle (2001)	Prophet Moon (2002)

Life Cycle is an album by American jazz drummer Whit Dickey recorded in 2000 and released on the Aum Fidelity label. Dickey leads the Nommonsemble, which includes Rob Brown on alto sax and flute, Mat Maneri on viola and Matthew Shipp on piano.

== Reception ==
Professional ratings
Review scores
Source	Rating
AllMusic	3/5 stars
The Penguin Guide to Jazz	3/4 stars

In his review for AllMusic, Sam Samuelson states "The Nommonsemble pull together a concise and pleasing recording that for the most part proves itself to be relevant and thought-provoking."

The Penguin Guide to Jazz notes that "They're a highly compatible quartet, four thinkers who prefer the dryer end of free jazz and, while the record isn't exactly exciting, it certainly makes its own space."

The JazzTimes review by Aaron Steinberg says "Though obdurate and knotty on the whole, Life Cycle maintains a calm and spacious core throughout, which is due largely to Dickey's drumming and his sensitive interaction with Shipp."

== Track listing ==
All compositions by Whit Dickey

1. "Wonder" – 5:32
2. "War" – 7:04
3. "Games" – 4:50
4. "Love" – 7:02
5. "Acceptance" – 7:55
6. "Transformation" – 9:21

== Personnel ==
- Whit Dickey – drums
- Rob Brown – alto sax, flute
- Mat Maneri – viola
- Matthew Shipp – piano
