= The Conduct of Jazz =

Studio album by Matthew Shipp
- Released: 2015
- Recorded: May 28, 2015
- Studio: Systems Two, New York City
- Genre: Jazz
- Length: 48:54
- Label: Thirsty Ear
- Producer: Peter Gordon

Matthew Shipp chronology
Our Lady of the Flowers (2015)	The Conduct of Jazz (2015)	Cactus (2016)

The Conduct of Jazz is an album by American jazz pianist Matthew Shipp recorded in 2015 and released on Thirsty Ear's Blue Series. It was the debut recording by the trio with Michael Bisio on bass and Newman Taylor Baker on drums.

== Reception ==
Professional ratings
Review scores
Source	Rating
Down Beat	4.5/5 stars

The All About Jazz review by Troy Collins states "From abstract expressionism to bluesy introspection, every facet of Shipp's artistry is on display.. The Conduct of Jazz offers irrefutable proof of Shipp's enduring mastery of the jazz idiom."

In another review for All About Jazz, John Sharpe notes "Shipp in full flow is unmistakable— a unique stylist who propounds his memorable mix of infectious motifs, glittering runs and avalanches of dense clusters."

The Down Beat review by Ken Micallef says "Shipp mines so many inspired melodic and rhythmic collisions that it’s worth focusing on the individual moments that make up the pianist’s larger compositional landscape: the Monkish delights of the title track, the nightmarish spirals of 'Ball And Space,' the expansive trio skirmishes of 'Primary Form' —together they form a gateway to higher improvisation that is practically without parallel."

== Track listing ==
All compositions by Matthew Shipp

1. "Instintive Touch" – 5:06
2. "The Conduct of Jazz" – 7:48
3. "Ball in Space" – 6:44
4. "Primary Form" – 4:45
5. "Blue Abyss" – 6:33
6. "Stream of Light" – 5:24
7. "The Bridge Across" – 12:34

== Personnel ==
- Matthew Shipp – piano
- Michael Bisio – bass
- Newman Taylor Baker – drums
