= Symbol Systems =

Studio album by Matthew Shipp
- Released: 1995
- Recorded: November 22, 1995
- Studio: Baby Monster, New York City
- Genre: Jazz
- Length: 60:51
- Label: No More
- Producer: Alan Schneider

Matthew Shipp chronology
Critical Mass (1995)	Symbol Systems (1995)	Prism (1996)

Symbol Systems is an album by American jazz pianist Matthew Shipp which was recorded in 1995 and became the first release on No More, a label founded by producer Alan Schneider. It was the first solo piano released by Shipp but was recorded five months after Before the World, a live performance which was released later.

He was approached by the producer to offer up some ideas for it, so Shipp later presented Schneider with what he had in mind "scribbled on a napkin." Spending one day in the recording studio, Shipp manufactured a recording of thirteen "compact miniatures of ideas imposed on a structure."

== Reception ==
Professional ratings
Review scores
Source	Rating
Allmusic	4.5/5 stars

In his review for AllMusic, Thom Jurek says about the album that "is a recommended place for those who are interested but unfamiliar with Shipp as a pianist, improviser, and composer to discover why, along with Marilyn Crispell, he is the most exciting pianist in music." In an article for the Boston Phoenix, Norman Weinstein states "Pensive, moody, full of flinty melodies that remind you Shipp's classical roots are firmly planted in Russian soil, these compositions haunt and unsettle."

== Track listing ==
All compositions by Matthew Shipp

1. "Clocks" – 7:04
2. "Harmonic Oscillator" – 3:51
3. "Temperate Zone" – 1:56
4. "Symbol Systems" – 4:50
5. "The Highway" – 6:09
6. "Self-Regulated Motion" – 3:20
7. "Frame" – 5:12
8. "Flow Of Meaning" – 7:14
9. "Dance Of The Blue Atoms" – 3:25
10. "Bop Abyss" – 4:37
11. "Nerve Signals" – 3:33
12. "Algebraic Boogie" – 2:16
13. "The Inventor Pt. 1" – 4:17
14. "The Inventor Pt. 2" – 3:07

== Personnel ==
- Matthew Shipp - piano
