= Before the World =

Live album by Matthew Shipp
- Released: 1997
- Recorded: June 14 & 15, 1995
- Venue: Akademie der Künste, Berlin
- Genre: Jazz
- Length: 68:24
- Label: FMP
- Producer: Jost Gebers

Matthew Shipp chronology
| The Flow of X (1997) | Before the World (1997) | By the Law of Music (1997) |

Before the World is an album by jazz pianist Matthew Shipp which was recorded live in 1995 and released on the FMP label. This was his first recorded solo album, although Symbol Systems was released before.

== Background ==
Shipp was invited to perform a solo concert during the Workshop Freie Musik '95 at The Akademie der Künste, in Berlin. He was informed that the concert would be recorded. A first for him, Shipp was "giddy" with the novelty of the experience, so before he played he conditioned his mind to "sound good for the recording." As he was quoted in the liner notes, "Since this was my first solo concert, to get my hands really accustomed to using the whole piano I actually worked on some things from the classical literature—baroque stuff mostly. That got me thinking in some new directions, and now I really want to work at it."

== Reception ==
Professional ratings
Review scores
| Source | Rating |
|---|---|
| AllMusic | 4/5 stars |
| The Penguin Guide to Jazz | 3/4 stars |

In his review for AllMusic, Thom Jurek states "Many of the themes and schematics here reveal themselves as fundamentals of or 'bases' for later works." The JazzTimes review by Willard Jenkins says about Shipp that the concert "displays his enormous facility at the keyboard. From a ripple to a scream, Shipp is quite literally all over the piano, though he never chooses to overwhelm with simple technique just for the sake of illustrating his capacity."

== Track listing ==
All compositions by Matthew Shipp

1. "Before #1" – 32:44
2. "Before #2" – 5:42
3. "Before #3" – 3:42
4. "Before #4" – 4:09
5. "Before #5" – 22:07

== Personnel ==
- Matthew Shipp - piano
