= Root of Things =

Studio album by Matthew Shipp
- Released: 2014
- Recorded: September 7, 2013
- Studio: Parkwest Studios, New York City
- Genre: Jazz
- Length: 43:45
- Label: Relative Pitch
- Producer: Mike Panico

Matthew Shipp chronology
Piano Sutras (2013)	Root of Things (2014)	The Darkseid Recital (2014)

Root of Things is an album by American jazz pianist Matthew Shipp, which was recorded in 2013 and released on Relative Pitch. It was the second studio recording by his trio with Michael Bisio on bass and Whit Dickey on drums.

== Reception ==
In a review for JazzTimes Mike Shanley states "If anyone is still convinced that Shipp doesn’t know how to swing, the walking bass and syncopated chords of 'Jazz It' should prove otherwise."

== Track listing ==
All compositions by Matthew Shipp

1. "Root of Things" – 6:33
2. "Jazz It" – 9:39
3. "Code J" – 4:04
4. "Path" – 9:46
5. "Pulse Code" – 4:11
6. "Solid Circuit" – 9:32

== Personnel ==
- Matthew Shipp – piano
- Michael Bisio – bass
- Whit Dickey – drums
