= Wisdom of Uncertainty =

Studio album by David S. Ware
- Released: September 30, 1997
- Recorded: December 2 and 3, 1996; Sound on Sound Studio, New York City
- Genre: Jazz
- Length: 62:32
- Label: AUM Fidelity; AUM 001
- Producer: David S. Ware

David S. Ware chronology
Godspelized (1996)	Wisdom of Uncertainty (1997)	Go See the World (1998)

Wisdom of Uncertainty is the eleventh album by American jazz saxophonist David S. Ware which was recorded in 1996 and became the first release on the AUM Fidelity label.

== Reception ==
Professional ratings
Review scores
Source	Rating
AllMusic	4.5/5 stars

In his review for AllMusic, Thom Jurek states "This is a record that sings; its song is a wild and wooly one to be sure, but it is a giant leap compositionally for Ware, and for the ensemble."

Mike Joyce of The Washington Post wrote: "Ware has developed an increasingly compelling voice as an instrumentalist on his own recordings in recent years. The sheer force of his tone -- and his seemingly superhuman ability to sustain and manipulate its raw emotional power -- are a marvel to behold, perhaps more so now than ever."

== Track listing ==
All compositions by David S. Ware

1. "Acclimation" - 12:45
2. "Antidromic" - 7:47
3. "Utopic" - 15:34
4. "Alignment" - 7:16
5. "Sunbows Rainsets Blue" - 7:41
6. "Continuum" - 11:34

== Personnel ==
- David S. Ware – tenor sax
- Matthew Shipp – piano
- William Parker – bass
- Susie Ibarra – drums
