= Cryptology (album) =

Studio album by David S. Ware
- Released: 1995
- Recorded: December 2, 1994
- Studio: Sound on Sound, New York
- Genre: Jazz
- Length: 61:36
- Label: Homestead
- Producer: David S. Ware

David S. Ware chronology
Earthquation (1994)	Cryptology (1995)	Oblations and Blessings (1996)

Cryptology is an album by jazz saxophonist David S. Ware, recorded in 1994 and released by Homestead Records.

== Background ==
In fall 1992, Steven Joerg took over as Homestead Records' manager. While he continued the label's indie-rock trajectory, Joerg adopted a radically different vision integrating free jazz on the same label where Sonic Youth, Dinosaur Jr and Big Black recorded seminal records. Pianist Matthew Shipp, who had a duo record with bassist William Parker on a Texas punk-rock label which had a deal with Homestead's parent company, talked him into signing the David S. Ware Quartet. According to Ware, Cryptology was "a meditation on Coltrane's example of using music as a vehicle for transcendence."

== Reception ==
Professional ratings
Review scores
Source	Rating
AllMusic	4/5 stars
The Penguin Guide to Jazz	3/4 stars

In his review for AllMusic, Thom Jurek says about the album "It is raw, unwavering, and intense almost beyond measure." The Penguin Guide to Jazz states that "the long-form, linked improvisations on Cryptology is an impressive first draft."

The album garnered a Lead Review slot in Rolling Stone by David Fricke, who says about the title piece "It's a sharp lesson for anyone who thinks free jazz is just a euphemism for no discipline".

The Wire placed the album in their "50 Records Of The Year 1995" list.

== Track listing ==
All compositions by David S. Ware

1. "Solar Passage" – 6:42
2. "Direction: Pleiades" – 9:04
3. "Dinosauria" – 10:03
4. "Cryptology / Theme Stream" – 14:19
5. "Panoramic" – 10:45
6. "The Liberator" – 10:44

== Personnel ==
- David S. Ware – tenor sax
- Matthew Shipp – piano
- William Parker – bass
- Whit Dickey – drums
