= 4D (album) =

Studio album by Matthew Shipp
- Released: 2010
- Recorded: May 17, 2009
- Studio: Roulette, New York City
- Genre: Jazz
- Length: 59:56
- Label: Thirsty Ear
- Producer: Peter Gordon

Matthew Shipp chronology
Harmonic Disorder (2009)	4D (2010)	SAMA (2010)

4D is a solo album by American jazz pianist Matthew Shipp, which was recorded in 2009 and released on Thirsty Ear's Blue Series.

== Reception ==
Professional ratings
Review scores
Source	Rating
Allmusic	4/5 stars

In his review for AllMusic, Thom Jurek states "On 4D, Shipp nods to history with keen depth perception and articulates his new directions gracefully."

The All About Jazz review by John Sharpe notes that "Shipp features standards and popular songs alongside his own compositions, with some recognizable straight away but others treated so obliquely as to be unrecognizable."

== Track listing ==
All compositions by Matthew Shipp except as indicated

1. "4D" – 4:18
2. "The Crack in the Piano" – 5:06
3. "Equilibrium" – 3:08
4. "Teleportation" – 4:17
5. "Dark Matter" – 2:35
6. "Stairs" – 2:57
7. "Jazz Paradox" – 4:49
8. "Blue Web in Space" – 5:36
9. "What Is This Thing Called Love" (Cole Porter) – 3:30
10. "Autumn Leaves" (Joseph Kosma / Jacques Prévert) – 2:46
11. "Sequence and Vibration" – 8:00
12. "Frère Jacques" (traditional) – 2:59
13. "Prelude to a Kiss" (Duke Ellington) – 3:01
14. "What a Friend We Have in Jesus" (Charles Converse) – 0:54
15. "Primal Harmony" – 3:43
16. "Greensleeves" (traditional) – 2:17

== Personnel ==
- Matthew Shipp - piano
