= Cosmic Suite =

Studio album by Matthew Shipp
- Released: 2008
- Recorded: January 31, 2008
- Studio: Leon Lee Dorsey Studio, New York City
- Genre: Jazz
- Length: 61:40
- Label: Not Two

Matthew Shipp chronology
Un Piano (2008)	Cosmic Suite (2008)	Harmonic Disorder (2009)

Cosmic Suite is an album by American jazz pianist Matthew Shipp recorded in 2008 and released on the Polish Not Two label. He leads a quartet with Daniel Carter on reeds, Joe Morris on bass and Whit Dickey on drums. This particular lineup has not recorded before, although all of the members have played together in other combinations.

== Reception ==
The All About Jazz review by John Sharpe states "Although billed as a suite, there are no obvious links between the cuts, which inhabit that delicious middle ground between the preconceived and the extemporized where distinctions blur, making the resultant offering more unknowable than a composition, yet more structured than complete improvisation."

== Track listing ==
All compositions by Matthew Shipp

1. "Cosmic Suite Part One" – 10:30
2. "Cosmic Suite Part Two" – 3:20
3. "Cosmic Suite Part Three" – 7:55
4. "Cosmic Suite Part Four" – 7:10
5. "Cosmic Suite Part Five" – 6:37
6. "Cosmic Suite Part Six" – 6:41
7. "Cosmic Suite Part Seven" – 4:34
8. "Cosmic Suite Part Eight" – 8:28
9. "Cosmic Suite Part Nine" – 6:25

== Personnel ==
- Matthew Shipp – piano
- Daniel Carter – reeds
- Joe Morris – bass
- Whit Dickey – drums
