= Equilibrium (Matthew Shipp album) =

Studio album by Matthew Shipp
- Released: 2003
- Recorded: July 2002
- Studios: Sorcerer Sound, New York City
- Genre: Jazz
- Length: 41:07
- Label: Thirsty Ear
- Producer: Matthew Shipp

Matthew Shipp, FLAM chronology
Nu Bop (2002)	Equilibrium (2003)	Antipop vs. Matthew Shipp (2003)

Equilibrium is an album by American jazz pianist Matthew Shipp recorded in 2002 and released on Thirsty Ear. According to Shipp, this fourth Blue Series record is a synthesis of what he learned from all their other albums in the series. He continues exploring beat elements with modern jazz.

== Reception ==
Professional ratings
Review scores
Source	Rating
AllMusic	4.5/5 stars
The New Rolling Stone Album Guide	4.5/5 stars
The Penguin Guide to Jazz	3/4 stars

In his review for AllMusic, Thom Jurek states "Shipp, whose restless vision is never clouded by grandiosity or pretense, has become the most important pianist on the scene today. Equilibrium is soul music for the mind."

The Penguin Guide to Jazz notes that "FLAM never seems fully integrated into music which retains its power through old-fashioned jazz staples such as improvisational interplay and rhythmical momentum."

The Pitchfork review by Chris Dahlen claims "With Equilibrium, Shipp has created a puzzle box, full of nuanced performances and cryptic details. It's not his most passionate work, but it's the closest to perfect, so precisely constructed that every note invites attention."

In his review for JazzTimes, Stuart Nicholsonn states "Part of a work in progress, Equilibrium moves beyond the so-called 'jazz tradition' to the real jazz tradition, where imagination has free reign [sic] and ideas evolve and develop their own momentum, inspired by the present and future as much (or more) than by the past."

== Track listing ==
All compositions by Matthew Shipp

1. "Equilibrium" – 3:44
2. "Vamp to Vibe" – 5:28
3. "Nebula Theory" – 5:25
4. "Cohesion" – 6:35
5. "World of Blue Glass" – 5:26
6. "Portal" – 1:13
7. "The Root" – 5:03
8. "The Key" – 4:12
9. "Nu Matrix" – 4:01

== Personnel ==
- Matthew Shipp – piano
- William Parker – bass
- Gerald Cleaver – drums
- Khan Jamal – vibes
- FLAM – synths + programming
