= Prism (Matthew Shipp album) =

Live album by Matthew Shipp
- Released: 1996
- Recorded: March 26, 1993
- Venue: Roulette, New York City
- Genre: Jazz
- Length: 55:35
- Label: Brinkman hatOLOGY
- Producer: Johan Kugelberg

Matthew Shipp chronology
Symbol Systems (1996)	Prism (1996)	2-Z (1996)

Prism is an album by American jazz pianist Matthew Shipp featuring his trio with bassist William Parker and drummer Whit Dickey, which was recorded live in 1993 and released on the small Dutch Brinkman label. The album was reissued in 2000 by hatOLOGY.

== Reception ==
Professional ratings
Review scores
Source	Rating
Allmusic	3/5 stars
The Penguin Guide to Jazz	3/4 stars

In his review for AllMusic, David R. Adler states "Prism is not as memorable as Shipp's later, more eclectic work, but it's still a significant statement." The Penguin Guide to Jazz says that "the two long pieces suggest, as usual in this period, that Shipp was trying out, discarding and picking up again all manner of ideas." The All About Jazz review by Glenn Astarita states "Prism is a relatively strong and noteworthy addition to Matthew Shipp's increasingly significant legacy."

== Track listing ==
All compositions by Matthew Shipp

1. "Prism I" – 29:55
2. "Prism II" – 25:40

== Personnel ==
- Matthew Shipp – piano
- William Parker – bass
- Whit Dickey – drums
