= Earthquation =

Studio album by David S. Ware
- Released: 1994
- Recorded: May 4 & 5, 1994
- Studio: Power Station, New York
- Genre: Jazz
- Length: 56:05
- Label: DIW
- Producer: Kazunori Sugiyama

David S. Ware chronology
| Third Ear Recitation (1993) | Earthquation (1994) | Cryptology (1995) |

Earthquation is an album by the American jazz saxophonist David S. Ware, recorded in 1994 and released on the Japanese DIW label.

== Music ==
As in previous DIW sessions, the quartet plays two standards, Eddie Heywood's "Canadian Sunset", which Ware first heard when he was young on Prestige record Boss Tenor by the saxophonist Gene Ammons, and two different versions of Walter Gross' "Tenderly". "Cococana" is dedicated to the Dutch filmmaker Coco Schrijber, who made the documentary about Ware In Motion.

== Reception ==
Professional ratings
Review scores
| Source | Rating |
|---|---|
| AllMusic | 3/5 stars |
| The Encyclopedia of Popular Music | 4/5 stars |
| The Penguin Guide to Jazz | 4/4 stars |

In his review for AllMusic, Don Snowden wrote: "Earthquation is almost certainly a lesser work in the David S. Ware discography." By contrast, The Penguin Guide to Jazz thought that the album "is the more visceral to date, and the first that really begins to push the envelope; Coltrane, Ayler and Sanders suddenly do seem like a generation back." The Gramophone wrote that "the swarming intensity, the restless momentum ... sound here like so much huffing and puffing; strenuous bravura standing in for loss of direction." Option wrote that Ware "is not out of control; he's just able to sustain solos for several minutes without a lot of melodic information."

== Track listing ==
All compositions by David S. Ware except as indicated

1. "Canadian Sunset" (Eddie Heywood / Norman Gimbel) - 7:32
2. "Inverse Alchemy" - 8:55
3. "Tenderly" (Walter Gross / Jack Lawrence) - 5:35
4. "Ideational Blue" - 8:26
5. "Cococana" - 11:32
6. "Tenderly" (Walter Gross / Jack Lawrence) - 4:45
7. "Earthquation" - 9:20

== Personnel ==
- David S. Ware - tenor saxophone
- Matthew Shipp - piano
- William Parker - double bass
- Whit Dickey - drums
