= Oblations and Blessings =

Studio album by David S. Ware
- Released: 1996
- Recorded: September 27 & 28, 1995
- Studio: Sound on Sound, New York
- Genre: Jazz
- Length: 69:00
- Label: Silkheart
- Producer: David S. Ware

David S. Ware chronology
Cryptology (1995)	Oblations and Blessings (1996)	DAO (1996)

Oblations and Blessings is an album by jazz saxophonist David S. Ware, recorded in 1995 and released on the Silkheart label. It features the David S. Ware Quartet with pianist Matthew Shipp, bassist William Parker and drummer Whit Dickey playing all original Ware compositions.

== Reception ==
Professional ratings
Review scores
Source	Rating
AllMusic	4/5 stars
The Penguin Guide to Jazz Recordings	3.5/4 stars

In his review for AllMusic, Don Snowden states "No one who hears Oblations and Blessings could ever doubt the generosity of Ware's offering here. The man must have been absolutely, utterly drained—emotionally, physically and spiritually—after this session."

== Track listing ==
All compositions by David S. Ware

1. "Oblations and Blessings" – 17:05
2. "Riff Unknown" – 10:53
3. "Of Shambhala" – 11:05
4. "Fire Within" – 11:07
5. "Manu's Ideal" – 10:13
6. "Serpents and Visions" – 8:37

== Personnel ==
- David S. Ware – tenor sax
- Matthew Shipp – piano
- William Parker – bass
- Whit Dickey – drums
