= DAO (album) =

Studio album by David S. Ware
- Released: 1996
- Recorded: September 29, 1995
- Studio: Sound on Sound, New York
- Genre: Jazz
- Length: 72:20
- Label: Homestead; HMS 230-2
- Producer: David S. Ware

David S. Ware chronology
Oblations and Blessings (1996)	DAO (1996)	Godspelized (1996)

DAO is an album by the American jazz saxophonist David S. Ware, recorded in 1995 and released on Homestead. In contrast with most of the quartet's previous albums, they didn't undergo the usual rigorous rehearsals for the recording, getting into the studio the day after the Oblations and Blessings sessions. DAO was the fifth and last recording by the David S. Ware Quartet with drummer Whit Dickey, who would be replaced by Susie Ibarra.

== Reception ==
Professional ratings
Review scores
Source	Rating
AllMusic	4/5 stars
The Penguin Guide to Jazz	3.5/4 stars

In his review for AllMusic, Thom Jurek states: "This is a stunner, and a beautiful example of four musicians listening intently to one another in the process of discovery." The Penguin Guide to Jazz wrote that "DAO is Ware's attempt to create his own A Love Supreme, a connected sequence of highly spiritual themes for what was rapidly becoming a 'classic quartet'."

== Track listing ==
All compositions by David S. Ware

1. "Interdao" – 6:22
2. "Motif Dao" – 9:18
3. "Rhythm Dao" – 7:00
4. "Tao Above Sky" – 7:36
5. "Dao Forms" – 18:16
6. "Dao Feel" – 8:28
7. "Dao" – 15:20

== Personnel ==
- David S. Ware – tenor sax
- Matthew Shipp – piano
- William Parker – bass
- Whit Dickey – drums
