= Expansion, Power, Release =

Studio album by Matthew Shipp
- Released: 2001
- Recorded: November 18, 1999
- Studio: Seltzer Sound, New York City
- Genre: Jazz
- Length: 56:04
- Label: hatOLOGY
- Producer: Art Lange

Matthew Shipp chronology
Pastoral Composure (2000)	Expansion, Power, Release (2001)	New Orbit (2001)

Expansion, Power, Release is an album by American jazz pianist Matthew Shipp which was recorded in 1999 and released on the Swiss hatOLOGY label. It was the second album by his String Trio with violinist Mat Maneri and bassist William Parker, the first was By the Law of Music.

== Reception ==
Professional ratings
Review scores
Source	Rating
The New Rolling Stone Album Guide	4/5 stars
The Penguin Guide to Jazz	3/4 stars

The Penguin Guide to Jazz states "The trio record functions somewhat in the manner of a classical ensemble, with some Vienesse references slipping into the design, but the pianist is at his freshest and most beguiling on what is a compact, smartly delivered set of mostly short pieces."

== Track listing ==
All compositions by Matthew Shipp

1. "Organs" – 2:22
2. "Expansion" – 2:57
3. "Waltz" – 3:58
4. "Combinational Entity" – 2:31
5. "Speech of Form" – 5:01
6. "Environment" – 3:00
7. "Weave Now a Web Rooted" – 5:38
8. "Connection" – 2:27
9. "Pulse Form" – 3:10
10. "Power" – 8:23
11. "Functional Form" – 2:58
12. "Reflex" – 2:21
13. "Release" – 8:07
14. "One More" – 3:11

== Personnel ==
- Matthew Shipp – piano
- Mat Maneri – violin
- William Parker – bass
