= Prophet Moon =

Live album by Whit Dickey
- Released: 2002
- Recorded: February 17, 2002
- Venue: Roulette, New York City
- Genre: Jazz
- Length: 54:15
- Label: Riti
- Producer: Whit Dickey

Whit Dickey chronology
Life Cycle (2001)	Prophet Moon (2002)	Coalescence (2004)

Prophet Moon is an album by American jazz drummer Whit Dickey recorded live in 2002 at the New York club Roulette and released on the Riti label, operated by free jazz musician Joe Morris. Dickey leads Trio Ahxoloxha, which includes Morris on guitar and Rob Brown on alto sax. The same lineup was originally an ensemble organized by Brown to record the CD Youniverse a decade before and has at various times been led by Morris as well.

== Reception ==
Professional ratings
Review scores
Source	Rating
The Penguin Guide to Jazz	3/4 stars

The Penguin Guide to Jazz states "The timbre of the group can seem a little monochrome at times, gives Morris's penchant for a neutral tone and Brown's even dynamics, but Dickey's own playing has rare clarity, which seems to bind the music together."

In a multiple review for JazzTimes Aaron Steinberg says "Morris shows up here on his familiar ax, the undistorted electric guitar, which Dickey sets against the punchy cries of Rob Brown's alto sax to great effect."

== Track listing ==
All compositions by Whit Dickey

1. "The Word on the Street" – 8:49
2. "Prophet Moon" – 18:39
3. "Trial by Fire" – 7:15
4. "Riptide" – 14:44
5. "Telling Moment" – 4:46

== Personnel ==
- Whit Dickey – drums
- Joe Morris – guitar
- Rob Brown – alto sax
