= Un Piano =

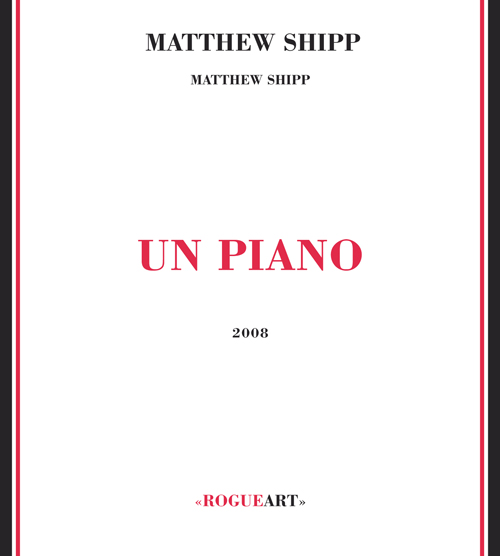

Studio album by Matthew Shipp
- Released: 2008
- Recorded: July 21 & 22, 2007
- Studio: MPI Studios, New York City
- Genre: Jazz
- Length: 47:25
- Label: RogueArt
- Producer: Michel Dorbon

Matthew Shipp chronology
Right Hemisphere (2008)	Un Piano (2008)	Cosmic Suite (2008)

Un Piano is a solo album by American jazz pianist Matthew Shipp which was recorded in 2007 and released on the French RogueArt label.

== Reception ==
The All About Jazz review by Lyn Horton states "Shipp reaches sonorities similar to the ones he has discovered before, but has found them starting from a different standpoint, a wider yet more honed transfiguration of the 88-key spectrum within which he breathes."

== Track listing ==
All compositions by Matthew Shipp

1. "Enter In" – 3:05
2. "Geometry" – 4:11
3. "Sparks" – 2:40
4. "Spike" – 3:31
5. "Linear Shocks" – 5:42
6. "Two Things Together" – 4:46
7. "Whole Zone" – 1:58
8. "Simple Fact" – 3:18
9. "Riddle" – 6:10
10. "Cloud Chamber 6" – 6:10
11. "Harmony of Apollo" – 4:56
12. "Exit Out" – 3:26

== Personnel ==
- Matthew Shipp – piano
