= Freedom Suite (David S. Ware album) =

Studio album by David S. Ware
- Released: October 1, 2002
- Recorded: July 13, 2002; Systems Two Studio, Brooklyn, NY
- Genre: Jazz
- Length: 39:25
- Label: AUM Fidelity; AUM 023
- Producer: Steven Joerg & David S. Ware

David S. Ware chronology
Live in the Netherlands (2001)	Freedom Suite (2002)	Threads (2003)

Freedom Suite is an album by saxophonist David S. Ware featuring his interpretation of the Sonny Rollins composition which was recorded in 2002 and released on the AUM Fidelity label.

== Reception ==
Professional ratings
Review scores
Source	Rating
AllMusic	4.5/5 stars
The Penguin Guide to Jazz Recordings	4/4 stars

In his review for AllMusic, Thom Jurek said "This is a passionate piece that's passionately played; its layers of meaning are particularly evocative at the turn of the 21st century, where the very meaning of freedom is hotly debated in all cultures. This is the most masterful of interpretations".

The All About Jazz review noted "The Freedom Suite is emotionally involving the whole way through. And after these forty minutes have passed, there's a palpable sense of calm and resolution. Perhaps that's a sign that Ware has managed to pass along some of his spiritual vision". The JazzTimes review by John Litweiler commented "It's good music, and I hope Sonny Rollins feels honored by this performance".

== Track listing ==
All compositions by Sonny Rollins

1. "The Freedom Suite: Movement 1" - 7:05
2. "The Freedom Suite: Interlude" - 11:37
3. "The Freedom Suite: Movement 2" - 8:12
4. "The Freedom Suite: Movement 3" - 12:30

== Personnel ==
- David S. Ware – tenor saxophone
- Matthew Shipp – piano
- William Parker – bass
- Guillermo E. Brown – drums
