= I've Been to Many Places =

Studio album by Matthew Shipp
- Released: 2014
- Recorded: March 31, 2014
- Studio: Park West Studios, Brooklyn
- Genre: Jazz
- Length: 60:12
- Label: Thirsty Ear
- Producer: Peter Gordon

Matthew Shipp chronology
The Darkseid Recital (2014)	I've Been to Many Places (2014)	To Duke (2015)

I've Been to Many Places is a solo album by American jazz pianist Matthew Shipp, which was recorded in 2014 and released on Thirsty Ear's Blue Series.

== Reception ==
Professional ratings
Review scores
Source	Rating
Allmusic	4/5 stars
Down Beat	4/5 stars

In his review for AllMusic, Thom Jurek states "I've Been to Many Places sounds like the record Shipp had to make for his own edification, one that chronicles his expansive, fearless push toward the spirit of the unknown with purpose, one that deepens and widens the already expansive reach of his language."

The Down Beat review by John Corbett claims "Shipp's in fine form, prime for retrospection and reinvigoration."

== Track listing ==
All compositions by Matthew Shipp except as indicated

1. "I've Been to Many Places" – 5:26
2. "Summertime" (George Gershwin) – 4:39
3. "Brain Stem Grammer" – 4:04
4. "Pre-Formal" – 2:03
5. "Web Play" – 3:36
6. "Tenderly" (Walter Gross/Jack Lawrence) – 3:02
7. "Life Cycle" – 4:28
8. "Brain Shatter" – 3:53
9. "Symbolic Access" – 3:57
10. "Waltz" – 2:06
11. "Reflex" – 3:21
12. "Naima" (John Coltrane) – 4:24
13. "Where Is the Love?" (Ralph MacDonald) – 1:31
14. "Light Years" – 3:19
15. "Where Is the Love? (reprise)" (Ralph McDonald) – 2:34
16. "Blue Astral Bodies" – 3:43
17. "Cosmic Wave" – 4:06

== Personnel ==
- Matthew Shipp - piano
