= Art of the Improviser =

Live album by Matthew Shipp
- Released: 2011
- Recorded: Trio (Disc One); April 1, 2010; Solo (Disc Two); June 12, 2010
- Venue: Trio (Disc One); The Arts Center of the Capital Region, Troy, New York; Solo (Disc Two) (Le) Poisson Rouge, New York City
- Genre: Jazz
- Length: 81:16
- Label: Thirsty Ear

Matthew Shipp chronology
Night Logic (2011)	Art of the Improviser (2011)	SaMa Live in Moscow (2011)

Art of the Improviser is a double CD by American jazz pianist Matthew Shipp featuring two 2010 live performances, a trio date at The Arts Center of the Capital Region in Troy, New York and a solo piano recital at (Le) Poisson Rouge in New York City. It was released on Thirsty Ear's Blue Series.

== Reception ==
Professional ratings
Review scores
Source	Rating
Allmusic	4/5 stars
Down Beat	4/5 stars
Tiny Mix Tapes	4.5/5 stars

In his review for AllMusic, Thom Jurek states "Art of the Improviser serves as a testament to Shipp’s achievements, yet it is also a continuation of the discovery in his developmental musical language."

In a review for JazzTimes Mike Shanley says about the solo date "Shipp tumbles around the keyboard but his ideas always seem fully developed no matter how rapidly he travels."

The All About Jazz review by Mark Corroto states "With the release of Art Of The Improviser, he has essentially summed up his first fifty years on two CDs of resolute and committed music."

The Down Beat review by Alain Drouot notes that "Few pianists can mix swing, angularity and dissonance with Shipp’s poise and aplomb. He negotiates with ease and nimbleness the many twists and turns he challenges himself with."

== Track listing ==
All compositions by Matthew Shipp except as indicated

Disc One

1. "The New Fact" - 12:27
2. "3 in 1" - 9:15
3. "Circular Temple #1" - 16:01
4. "Take the "A" Train" (Billy Strayhorn) - 7:44
5. "Virgin Complex" - 6:49

Disc Two

1. "4D" - 5:39
2. "Fly Me to the Moon" (Bart Howard) - 5:12
3. "Wholetone" - 8:03
4. "Module" - 7:52
5. "Gamma Ray" - 7:24
6. "Patmos" - 4:50

== Personnel ==
- Matthew Shipp – piano
- Michael Bisio – bass (Disc One)
- Whit Dickey – drums (Disc One)
