= One (Matthew Shipp album) =

Studio album by Matthew Shipp
- Released: 2005
- Recorded: August 18, 2005
- Studio: Leon Lee Dorsey Studios, New York City
- Genre: Jazz
- Length: 40:33
- Label: Thirsty Ear
- Producer: Matthew Shipp, Peter Gordon

Matthew Shipp chronology
In Finland (2004)	One (2005)	Phenomena of Interference (2006)

One is a solo studio album by American jazz pianist Matthew Shipp, which was recorded in 2005 and released on Thirsty Ear's Blue Series.

== Reception ==
Professional ratings
Review scores
Source	Rating
Allmusic	4/5 stars
The Penguin Guide to Jazz	4/4 stars

In his review for AllMusic, Thom Jurek states "One is a fully realized and poetic work by a mature pianist who should finally begin getting his due, not only as an improviser and a visionary but as a technician as well."

The Penguin Guide to Jazz notes that "he delves into the worlds of Cecil Taylor, Bud Powell and Thelonious Monk, but without ever once referencing any of these ancestral presences directly."

The All About Jazz review by Nic Jones claims "If indeed it is the case that the solo piano recital is fraught with potential hazards, then Shipp manages to avoid them through the simple expedient of writing his own rulebook."

The Pitchfork review by Matthew Murphy states "With their compact, elegant architecture and measured elocution, One's 12 songs often resemble the early 20th century piano studies of Ravel or Debussy as closely as they do modern jazz."

== Track listing ==
All compositions by Matthew Shipp.

1. "Arc" – 3:08
2. "Patmos" – 3:38
3. "Gamma Ray" – 4:27
4. "Milky Way" – 3:25
5. "Blue in Orion" – 3:32
6. "Electro Magnetism" – 2:43
7. "The Encounter" – 4:05
8. "The Rose Is a Rose" – 2:08
9. "IEOU" – 3:21
10. "Abyss Code" – 2:30
11. "Zero" – 3:23
12. "Module" – 4:13

== Personnel ==
- Matthew Shipp – piano
