= Piano Vortex =

Studio album by Matthew Shipp
- Released: 2007
- Recorded: February 28, 2007
- Studio: MPI Studios, New York City
- Genre: Jazz
- Length: 53:13
- Label: Thirsty Ear

Matthew Shipp chronology
Salute to 100001 Stars (2006)	Piano Vortex (2007)	Right Hemisphere (2008)

Piano Vortex is an album by American jazz pianist Matthew Shipp recorded in 2007 and released on Thirsty Ear's Blue Series. He leads a traditional acoustic piano trio with Joe Morris on bass and Whit Dickey on drums.

== Reception ==
Professional ratings
Review scores
Source	Rating
Allmusic	4/5 stars

In his review for AllMusic, Thom Jurek states "Piano Vortex is the most intimate recording Shipp has made in a long while. He looks back through the music's history and speaks with it, as it informs his own extension of it."

The All About Jazz review by Troy Collins says "The trio blends turbulent swing with brooding ambience. Shipp's writing embodies a dusky, foreboding quality, coloring restless momentum with shades of uncertainty; his pieces veer from still melancholy to tumultuous agitation."

== Track listing ==
All compositions by Matthew Shipp

1. "Piano Vortex" – 10:27
2. "Key Swing" – 3:21
3. "The New Circumstance" – 9:12
4. "Nooks and Corners" – 4:10
5. "Sliding Through Space" – 8:54
6. "Quivering with Speed" – 6:39
7. "Slips Through the Fingers" – 3:17
8. "To Vitalize" – 7:13

== Personnel ==
- Matthew Shipp – piano
- Joe Morris – bass
- Whit Dickey – drums
