= David S. Ware =

American jazz saxophonist

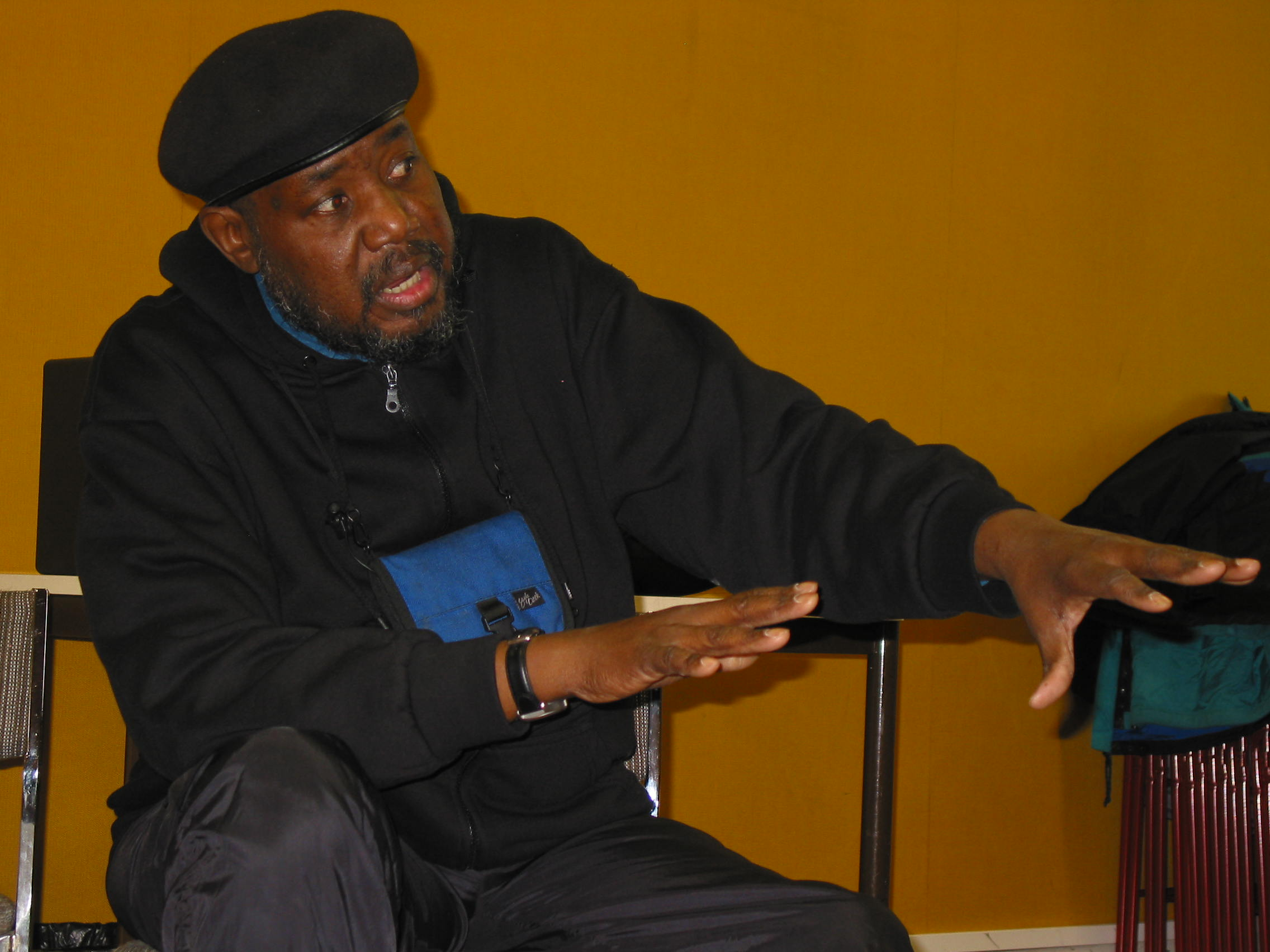
- David S. Ware

Background information
- Born: David Spencer Ware; November 7, 1949; Plainfield, New Jersey, U.S.
- Died: October 18, 2012 (aged 62) New Brunswick, New Jersey, U.S.
- Genres: Jazz, free jazz, avant-garde jazz
- Occupations: Musician, composer, bandleader
- Instrument: Saxophone
- Labels: Silkheart, DIW, Homestead, AUM Fidelity, Columbia, Thirsty Ear
- Website: davidsware.com

David Spencer Ware (November 7, 1949 – October 18, 2012) was an American jazz saxophonist, composer, and bandleader.

== Biography ==
Ware was born in Plainfield, New Jersey, and grew up in Scotch Plains, New Jersey. While in high school he attended music camp at the University of Connecticut taught by Ron Carter, Charlie Mariano, and Alan Dawson and played in his school's bands as well as in the New Jersey All-State band. He graduated from Scotch Plains-Fanwood High School and briefly attended the Berklee College of Music in 1967–68.

Ware moved from Boston to New York City in 1973, where he participated in the loft jazz scene, and later worked as a cab driver for 14 years in order to focus on his own group concept. In the early 1980s, he returned to Scotch Plains with his wife Setsuko S. Ware.

Ware's debut album as a leader was recorded in 1977 – together with pianist Gene Ashton (aka Cooper-Moore) and drummer Marc Edwards – and released by HatHut in 1979. He performed and recorded with the groups of pianist Cecil Taylor and drummer Andrew Cyrille in the mid-late 1970s. He formed his own quartet in 1989. The group was originally composed of Ware, pianist Matthew Shipp, bassist William Parker, and drummer Marc Edwards. While Shipp and Parker were members for the group's entire existence, the drum chair was later occupied by Whit Dickey, Susie Ibarra, and Guillermo E. Brown.

The David S. Ware Quartet performed across the US and Europe and released a series of increasingly acclaimed albums spanning the 1990s on the independent labels Silkheart, DIW, Homestead, and AUM Fidelity. Saxophonist Branford Marsalis signed Ware to Columbia Records in 1998 for a three-album contract. In 2001, jazz critic Gary Giddins described Ware's quartet as "the best small band in jazz today". In 2007, after 17 years together, the quartet was disbanded following the release of the album Renunciation and a final European tour that spring. Ware proceeded to perform concerts and record albums with a series of new group configurations: a new quartet featuring guitarist Joe Morris, William Parker, and drummer Warren Smith; a special trio celebrating his 50th year of playing saxophone (in 2009) with Parker and Smith; a 2-volume series of solo saxophone performances; and finally with his last quartet, Planetary Unknown, featuring Cooper-Moore, Parker, and drummer Muhammad Ali. His final concert performance was with Planetary Unknown on August 27, 2011, at Jazzfestival Saalfelden in Austria. The recording of that concert was released in July 2012 on AUM Fidelity.

Ware was first diagnosed with kidney failure in 1999. He continued a decade of creative activity while on a strict regimen of peritoneal dialysis, and Ware underwent a successful kidney transplantation in May 2009. The organ donor was Floridian Laura Mehr, who responded to an urgent email message sent out to nearly 1,000 of Ware's fans. He returned to the stage that October, and continued to perform and record highly acclaimed work for the next two years, even as he endured serious complications brought on by required immunosuppressant medication. He finally succumbed to an aggressive blood infection and died on October 18, 2012, at Robert Wood Johnson University Hospital in New Brunswick, New Jersey, age 62.

== Discography ==
=== As leader ===
- From Silence to Music (Palm, 1978)
- Birth of a Being (HatHut, 1979) – recorded in 1977; expanded and remastered version issued in 2015
- Passage to Music (Silkheart, 1989) – recorded in 1988
- Great Bliss, Vol. 1 (Silkheart, 1991) – recorded in 1990
- Great Bliss, Vol. 2 (Silkheart, 1991) – recorded in 1990
- Flight of I (DIW/Columbia 1992)
- Third Ear Recitation (DIW, 1993)
- Earthquation (DIW, 1994)
- Cryptology (Homestead, 1995)
- Oblations and Blessings (Silkheart, 1996)
- DAO (Homestead, 1996)
- Godspelized (DIW, 1996)
- Wisdom of Uncertainty (AUM Fidelity, 1997)
- Go See the World (Columbia, 1998)
- Surrendered (Columbia, 2000)
- Corridors & Parallels (AUM Fidelity, 2001)
- Live in the Netherlands (Splasc(H), 2001)
- Freedom Suite (AUM Fidelity, 2002)
- Threads (Thirsty Ear, 2003)
- Live in the World (Thirsty Ear, 2005)
- BalladWare (Thirsty Ear, 2006) – recorded in 1999
- Renunciation (AUM Fidelity, 2007)
- Live in Vilnius (NoBusiness, 2009)
- Shakti (AUM Fidelity, 2009)
- Saturnian (AUM Fidelity, 2010)
- Onecept (AUM Fidelity, 2010)
- Planetary Unknown (AUM Fidelity, 2011)
- Organica (AUM Fidelity, 2011)
- Live at Jazzfestival Saalfelden 2011 (AUM Fidelity, 2012)
- Live in Sant'Anna Arresi, 2004 (AUM Fidelity, 2016)
- Live in New York, 2010 (AUM Fidelity, 2017)
- The Balance (AUM Fidelity, 2018)
- Théâtre Garonne, 2008 (AUM Fidelity, 2019)

=== As sideman ===
With Ahmed Abdullah

- Ahmed Abdullah and the Solomonic Quintet (Silkheart, 1988) – recorded 1987

With Abdul Hannan / The Third World

- Awareness (Abdul Hannan, 1971)

With Andrew Cyrille & Maono

- Celebration (IPS, 1975)
- Junction (IPS, 1976)
- Metamusicians' Stomp (Black Saint, 1978)
- Special People (Soul Note, 1980)

With DJ Wally

- Nothing Stays the Same (Thirsty Ear, 2003) – 1 track on "Out of the Blue"

With Cecil Taylor Unit

- Dark to Themselves (Enja, 1977) – recorded 1976

With Beaver Harris

- African Drums (Owl, 1978)

With Ahmed Abdullah

- Ahmed Abdullah and the Solomonic Quintet (Silkheart, 1988)

With Cooper-Moore

- Outtakes 1978 (Hopscotch, 2005)

With William Parker

- Centering: Unreleased Early Recordings 1976–1987 (NoBusiness, 2012)
