= Cactus (Bobby Kapp and Matthew Shipp album) =

Studio album by Bobby Kapp and Matthew Shipp
- Released: 2016
- Recorded: 2016
- Studio: Systems Two, Brooklyn
- Genre: Jazz
- Length: 61:21
- Label: Northern Spy

Matthew Shipp chronology
The Conduct of Jazz (2015)	Cactus (2016)	Piano Song (2017)

Cactus is an album by American jazz drummer Bobby Kapp and pianist Matthew Shipp, which was recorded in 2016 and released on Northern Spy. It was their first duo recording, following 2015's Kapp quartet album Themes 4 Transmutation.

== Reception ==
In a review for Pitchfork Marc Masters notes "The thrill of Cactus is not that the music could fall apart at any moment, but that this duo can handle anything they throw at each other."

The All About Jazz review by Dan MccLenaghan states "Everything meshed on this set. Cactus proves itself cohesive CD full of unpretentious, adventurous, improvised beauty."

In another review for All About Jazz Karl Ackermann says "The music is engaging from beginning to end and, more importantly, there is an element of surprise in each piece that makes the overall album extremely satisfying."

== Track listing ==
All compositions by Kapp/Shipp.

1. "Overture" – 8:32
2. "Before" – 4:27
3. "During" – 5:51
4. "Money" – 6:11
5. "Cactus" – 5:32
6. "After" – 8:09
7. "Good Wood" – 10:50
8. "Snow Storm Coming" – 5:41
9. "The 3rd Sound" – 6:08

== Personnel ==
- Bobby Kapp – drums
- Matthew Shipp – piano
