= Floating Ice =

Studio album by Michael Bisio & Matthew Shipp
- Released: 2012
- Recorded: January 17, 2012
- Studio: Parkwest Studios, New York City
- Genre: Jazz
- Length: 57:52
- Label: Relative Pitch
- Producer: Michael Bisio, Mike Panico

Matthew Shipp chronology
| Elastic Aspects (2012) | Floating Ice (2012) | Rex, Wrecks & XXX (2013) |

Floating Ice is an album by American jazz bassist Michael Bisio and pianist Matthew Shipp, which was recorded in 2012 and released on Relative Pitch Records. It was their first recording together as a duo.

== Reception ==
Professional ratings
Review scores
| Source | Rating |
|---|---|
| Down Beat | 4/5 stars |

In a review for JazzTimes Mike Shanley notes that "Although the musicians occasionally digress into personal tangents, they always manage to reconnect before things get too chaotic. Floating Ice offers an engaging look at their thought process."

The All About Jazz review by Troy Collins states "Floating Ice is a revealing portrait of two master improvisers engaged in spontaneous discourse, with every nuance of their attentive interplay captured in minute detail."

The Down Beat review by Michael Jackson says that "Matthew Shipp has an interest in the sweet science of boxing, and it doesn’t surprise given his knuckle-dusting duck ’n’ dive pianism.. Shipp’s music is speedball attack and shadow boxing."

In a review for The Guardian John Fordham says "It's free-jazz, but full of melody, and every sound counts."

== Track listing ==
All compositions by Bisio / Shipp

1. "Floating Ice" – 8:09
2. "The Queen's Ballad" – 7:04
3. "Swing Laser" – 9:04
4. "Disc" – 6:37
5. "Supernova" – 6:53
6. "Holographic Rag" – 10:28
7. "Decay" – 9:37

== Personnel ==
- Michael Bisio – bass
- Matthew Shipp – piano
