= By the Law of Music =

Studio album by Matthew Shipp
- Released: 1997
- Recorded: August 5, 1996
- Studio: Seltzer Sound, New York City
- Genre: Jazz
- Length: 60:46
- Label: HatART
- Producer: Art Lange

Matthew Shipp chronology
Before the World (1997)	By the Law of Music (1997)	Thesis (1997)

By the Law of Music is an album by American jazz pianist Matthew Shipp which was recorded in 1996 and released on the Swiss HatART label. It was re-released on the hatOLOGY imprint in 2002.

The record marks the debut of his String Trio with violinist Mat Maneri and bassist William Parker. On all other previous recordings Maneri played electric violin, but in this session used exclusively acoustic violin. The album was conceived as a twelve-part suite, but Shipp decided to record Duke Ellington's "Solitude" as a final touch after the suite.

== Reception ==
Professional ratings
Review scores
Source	Rating
AllMusic	4/5 stars

In his review for AllMusic, Steve Loewy states "As with almost any artistic invention, the music can be heard on a variety of levels: as chamber jazz, it has a beauty that rewards even the casual listener, while the sophisticated interrelationships give it a great depth and even charm." The JazzTimes review by Josef Woodard says that "The album closes disarmingly, with an anarchic reading of Duke Ellington's 'Solitude', in which the pianist lays down the recognizable form of the tune, while the others dance in atonal abandon."

== Track listing ==
All compositions by Matthew Shipp except as indicated

1. "Signal" – 0:17
2. "By the Law of Music" – 2:51
3. "Implicit" – 6:58
4. "Fair Play" – 5:00
5. "Grid" – 6:45
6. "Whole Movement" – 3:05
7. "Game of Control" – 7:56
8. "Point to Point" – 4:21
9. "P X" – 3:28
10. "Grid" – 5:36
11. "Coo" – 5:05
12. "X Z U" – 4:31
13. "Solitude" (Duke Ellington) – 4:53

== Personnel ==
- Matthew Shipp – piano
- Mat Maneri – violin
- William Parker – bass
