= Michael Bisio =

American jazz musician

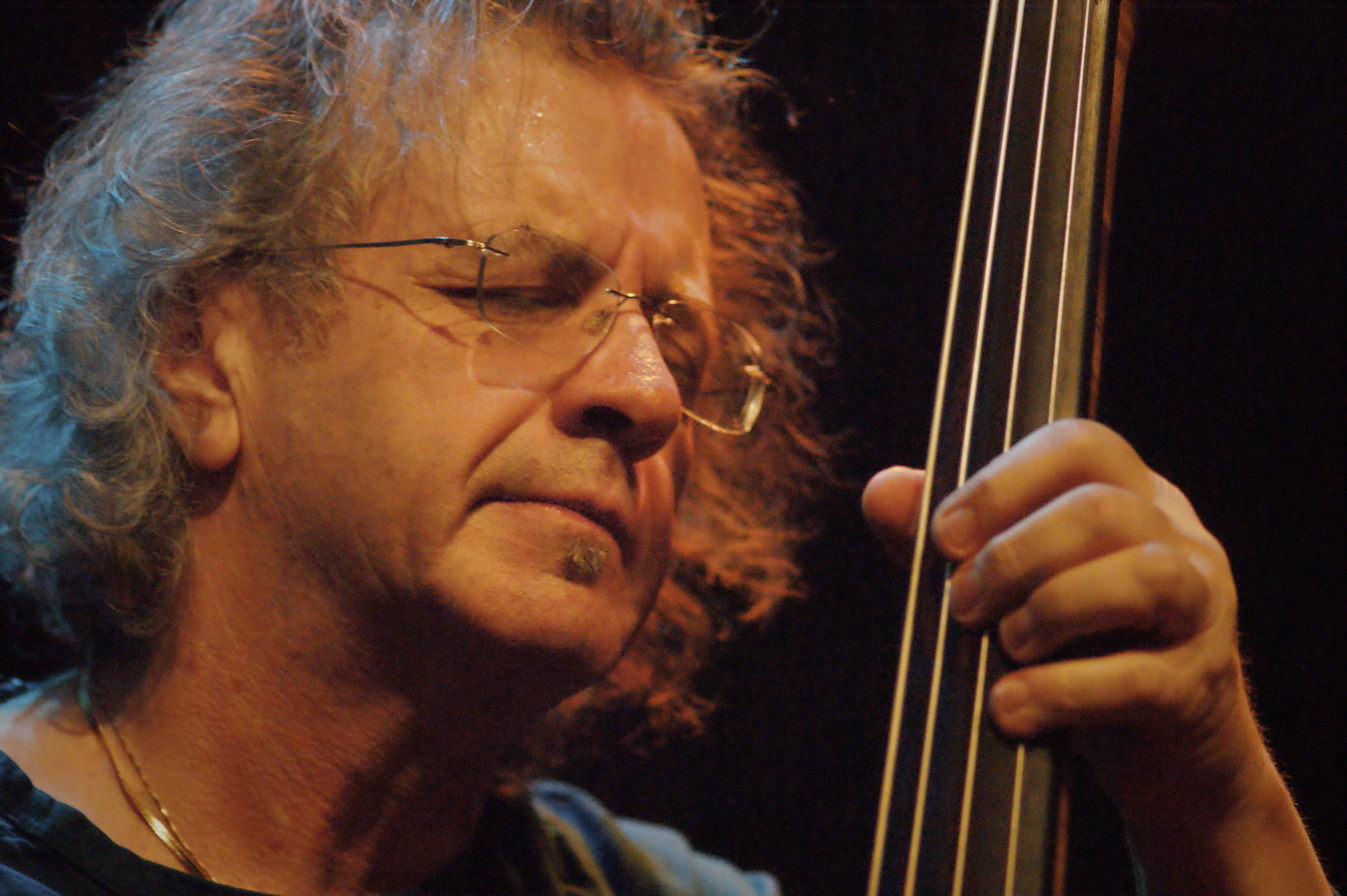
Bisio pictured in 2011

Michael Bisio (March 4, 1955 Troy, New York) is an American jazz double bassist, composer, and bandleader. Since 2009 he has been the bassist for the Matthew Shipp Trio.

Bisio appears on over 100 CDs, leading on 12 CDs and co-leading on another dozen.

Bisio has composed over one hundred works which have been performed in clubs, concert venues, and festivals. They have been broadcast over assorted media. Most have been recorded; some were composed for films and theater, and one found was used in animation.

In his book Jackson Street After Hours, music critic Paul de Barros called Bisio one of the heirs to Seattle's earthy yet innovative tradition and marked his compositional style as "a spare, bluesy sound, the sweet- and-sour timbres favored by Charles Mingus."

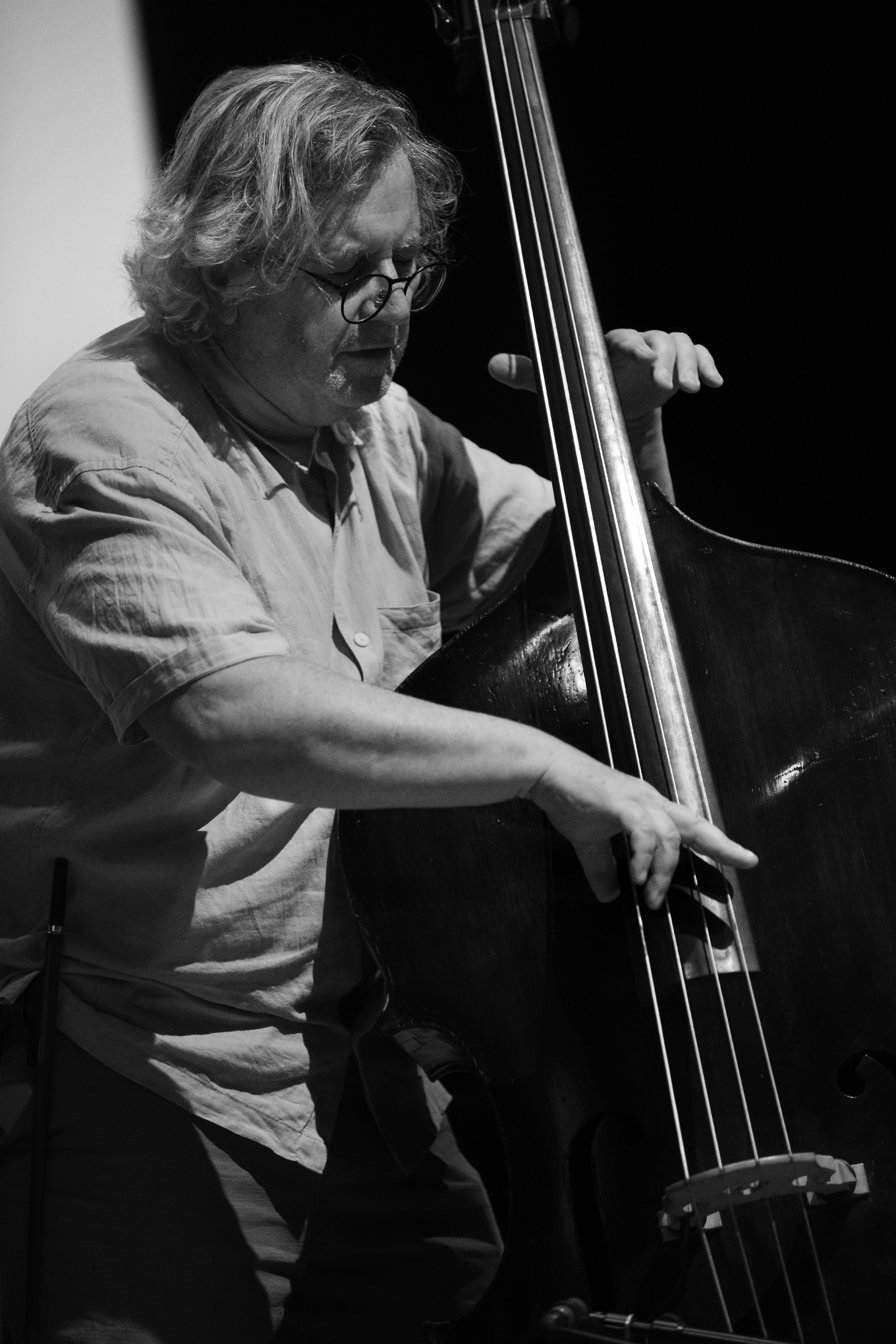
Michael Bisio, Arts for Art - Vision Festival 2024. Photo by Marek Lazarski

Bisio composed the music for Karl Krogstad's film Strings (1985). Beat Angel (2004), a film by Randy Allred with Vincent Balestri, features Bisio's compositions and improvisations. In his film Time & Object, animator Bernard Roddy uses "Something Different" from Zebulon as the score. Bisio composed music for Music for American Voices: Bukowski, Micheline and the First Amendment, a play written and performed by Vincent Balestri.

== Discography ==
=== As leader ===
- In Seattle (Silkheart, 1987)
- Finger Wigglers (CIMP, 1997)
- MBEK (Meniscus, 1999)
- Undulations (Omnitone, 2000)
- Covert Choreography (Cadence, 2002)
- Composance (Cadence, 2004)
- Collar City Createology (MJB, 2009)
- Session at 475 Kent (Mutable Music, 2010)
- Three (Clean Feed, 2011)
- The Gift (Leo, 2012)
- The Edge (Leo, 2013)
- The Other Edge (Leo, 2014)
- Soul (Leo, 2016)
- Discovers (CIMP, 2016)
- AM (CIMP, 2017)

=== As sideman ===
With Matthew Shipp

- Art of the Improviser (Thirsty Ear, 2011)
- Elastic Aspects (Thirsty Ear, 2011)
- Floating Ice (Thirsty Ear, 2011)
- Root of Things (Relative Pitch, 2013)
- The Gospel According to Matthew and Michael (Relative Pitch, 2014)
- The Conduct of Jazz (Thirsty Ear, 2015)
- Live in Seattle (Arena Music Promotion, 2016)
- Piano Song (Thirsty Ear, 2017)
- Not Bound (Fortune, 2017)
- Sonic Fiction (ESP-Disk, 2018)

With Joe McPhee

- Common Threads (Deep Listening, 1996)
- Zebulon (CIMP, 1998 [1999])
- In the Spirit (CIMP, 1999)
- No Greater Love (CIMP, 1999 [2000])
- Port of Saints (CjR, 2000 [2006])
- Remembrance (CjR, 2001 [2005])
