= RogueArt =

French independent record label

- Founded: 2005
- Founder: Michel Dorbon
- Genre: Jazz, avant-garde jazz, improvisation
- Country of origin: France
- Location: Paris
- Official website: roguart.com

RogueArt (also written Rogueart and Rogue Art) is a French independent record label based in Paris. It was founded by record producer Michel Dorbon in 2005 and specialises in jazz and improvised music.

== History ==
RogueArt was founded by record producer Michel Dorbon in 2005, and its first release was the album, Bindu by jazz percussionist Hamid Drake.

In the 1960s and 1970s, Dorbon listened to rock groups like Cream, Soft Machine and Henry Cow because of their use of improvisation. His first exposure to free jazz was at an Archie Shepp concert in the 1970s. His interest in this type of jazz led him to start working for various record labels. In the late 1990s he began producing records for Bleu Regard, a French record label. After several years, Dorbon decided he wanted more control of the production process, and in 2005, he established his own record label, RogueArt in Paris.

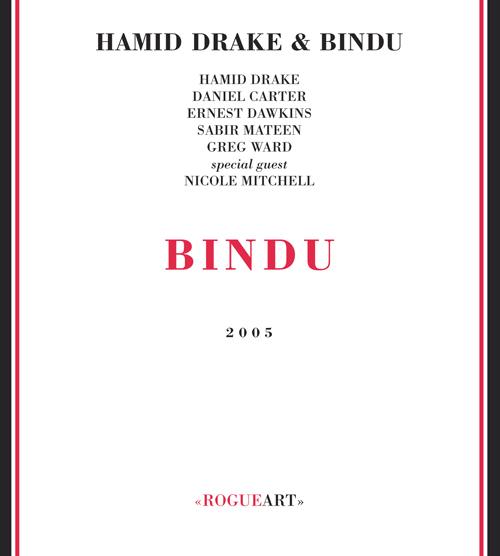
Bindu by Hamid Drake, RogueArt's first release, showing the label's distinctive cover design

Dorbon said "'RogueArt' is a natural name for a label that provides shelter for music that is outside the mainstream." He wanted the RogueArt covers to be "original, sober, noticeable and beautiful", and asked artist Max Schoendorff for ideas. Schoendorff proposed a design of a white cover with no images or pictures, plain red and black text in the middle, and red and black stripes on the left and right borders. Dorbon accepted the design without any changes and used it for all RogueArt's releases.

RogueArt features some European musicians, but mostly American artists because of Dorbon's "love for American, and particularly New York, jazz". As of December 2020 RogueArt had released over 100 albums. Included in their catalogue is Passages (2012), a concept album by cellist Didier Petit and writer Alexandre Pierrepont. It was made during a 2011 trip across America during which they stopped at Los Angeles, Woodstock, Chicago and New York City to improvise and record with local musicians, including Drake, Gerald Cleaver, Marilyn Crispell, Nicole Mitchell and Michael Zerang. Pierrepont's contribution was a booklet of texts describing their trip and musical encounters.

In addition to audio releases, RogueArt has also published several books, including Conversations, Conversations II and Conversations III by free jazz double bassist William Parker. The three volumes comprise photographs and interviews conducted by Parker. All RogueArt books have the same white covers with red and black text as their albums.

== See also ==
- Lists of record labels
