= Raining on the Moon =

Studio album by William Parker Quartet featuring Leena Conquest
- Released: May 21, 2002
- Recorded: October 2, 2001; Strobe-Light Studio, NYC
- Genre: Jazz
- Length: 48:41
- Label: Thirsty Ear; THI57119-2
- Producer: William Parker

William Parker chronology
Raincoat in the River (2001)	Raining on the Moon (2002)	Eloping with the Sun (2003)

Raining on the Moon is an album by American jazz bassist and composer William Parker's Quartet featuring vocalist Leena Conquest, which was recorded in 2001 and released on the Thirsty Ear label. Since the original album, the name has also come to identify the group from this record, including, on all subsequent releases to date, pianist Eri Yamamoto.

== Reception ==
Professional ratings
Review scores
Source	Rating
AllMusic	4/5 stars
Pitchfork	8.4/10
The Penguin Guide to Jazz	3.5/4 stars

In her review for AllMusic, Paula Edelstein states "Parker's basslines exchange and transform the compositions into textured applications of free jazz, loaded with unfamiliar improvisations and shifting between crisp and blunt and through blues, bop, and free" Pitchfork's review noted "The album generally sticks with a strident, determined tone, with echoes of 60s and 70s protest music-- Conquest often evokes the spirit of, say, Abbey Lincoln on Max Roach's Freedom Now Suite-- yet the lyrics don't signify opposition so much as they dream of alternatives: a better world, more justice, watermelons that grow on trees... These are wild visions, but they sure seem real, and even attainable, when Conquest sings of them". The Penguin Guide to Jazz observed "There is something refreshingly sanguine and upbeat about all the music on this record".

The All About Jazz review noted "What marks Raining on the Moon as unique in Parker's long list of recordings is its raw accessibility. Listeners from various backgrounds will find this disc inviting and exciting. And if that serves the purpose of introducing Parker's vision to new ears, it's more than done its job". PopMatters enthused "With Raining on the Moon, Parker gives evidence to back up his large stature in creative music, showing himself to be a modern day Charles Mingus. Here, he proves once and for all that any divisions between mainstream jazz and its more avant garde brethren need only be drawn in the minds of myopic listeners".

== Track listing ==
All compositions by William Parker

1. "Hunk Pappa Blues" – 6:57
2. "Song of Hope" – 6:33
3. "Old Tears" – 5:32
4. "Raining on the Moon" – 14:09
5. "Music Song" – 3:37
6. "The Watermelon Song" – 2:28
7. "James Baldwin to the Rescue" – 8:01
8. "Donso Ngoni" – 1:24

== Personnel ==
- William Parker – bass
- Leena Conquest – vocals
- Lewis Barnes – trumpet
- Rob Brown – alto saxophone, flute
- Hamid Drake – drums

== Discography ==
Since the release of this album, credited to "William Parker Quartet featuring Leena Conquest," several albums have been released with the Quartet and Leena Conquest, as well as pianist Eri Yamamoto. These albums are credited to "William Parker / Raining on the Moon" or "William Parker & Raining on the Moon"

- Corn Meal Dance (recorded 2007)
- Great Spirit (recorded 2007/2012)
- "Friday Afternoon" (recorded 2012), disk 7 of Wood Flute Songs: Anthology/Live 2006–2012
