= Never Too Late But Always Too Early =

Live album by Peter Brötzmann, William Parker, and Hamid Drake
- Released: 2003
- Recorded: April 10, 2001
- Venue: Casa del Popolo, Montréal
- Genre: Free jazz
- Label: Eremite; MTE037/38
- Producer: Michael Ehlers, Peter Brötzmann

Never Too Late But Always Too Early is a two-CD live album by saxophonist Peter Brötzmann, bassist William Parker, and drummer Hamid Drake. It was recorded in April 2001 at Casa del Popolo in Montréal, and was released in 2003 by Eremite Records. The album is dedicated to Peter Kowald.

The Brötzmann / Parker / Drake group has been known as the "Die Like a Dog Trio" since recording the album Die Like a Dog: Fragments of Music, Life and Death of Albert Ayler with trumpeter Toshinori Kondo in 1993. An April 24, 2001, concert in Houston, Texas was described as "an electrifying performance that left the crowd drained but begging for more." Tad Hendrickson of CMJ New Music Report wrote that the trio "operates at a level of intuitive musicianship seldom achieved by others."

== Reception ==
Professional ratings
Review scores
Source	Rating
AllMusic	4.5/5 stars
The Penguin Guide to Jazz	4/4 stars
Pitchfork	8.5/10 stars

The album was included in The Wire's 2003 Rewind, and was listed as the year's #1 jazz recording.

In a review for AllMusic, Thom Jurek wrote: "Brötzmann, Parker, and Drake reveal in depth here just how they have gelled as a trio... the intensity level is high from the jump."

The authors of the Penguin Guide to Jazz Recordings awarded the album 4 stars, stating that it "catches the trio in magnificent form... Two long sets have very little in the way of treading water."

A reviewer for Pitchfork commented: "This is a pernicious, pummeling disarray, like all of Brötzmann's albums, and he still makes time for some significant innovations... The instruments are still gloriously combusting all over this show, but there's a more melancholy lyricism affixed to them. This is the first Brötzmann album... that got stuck in my head hours after it had ended."

Bill Shoemaker, writing for Jazz Times, stated: "whenever Brotzmann plays with bassist William Parker and drummer Hamid Drake, there is a palpable aura of spirits unleashed, furiously seeking right... the cathartic power of this album makes for a fitting tribute to Kowald."

In an article for Dusted Magazine, Jason Bivins wrote: "It's a marathon ride, and from Brötz's opening shrieks on tarogato you know that seatbelts should remain firmly fastened. The trio cycles through most of its moods, registers, and instrumentations throughout the long and rewarding sets: crushing funk, rolling free expressionism, muscular swing, and the occasional dark textural mood... both discs are filled with the nice, harsh lyricism that distinguishes this band."

The Free Jazz Collective's Stuart Broomer noted the album's "searing, visceral pull," and called Brötzmann "one of the great existential improvisers of free jazz, in that his intensity does not seem to move toward transcendence but instead speaks of expanding passion."

== Track listing ==
=== Disc One ===
1. "Never Run but Go I" – 19:19
2. "Never Run but Go II" – 4:47
3. "Never Run but Go III" – 9:31
4. "Never Run but Go IV" – 9:51
5. "The Heart and the Bones" – 18:26

=== Disc Two ===
1. "Never Too Late but Always Too Early I" – 16:51
2. "Never Too Late but Always Too Early II" – 11:02
3. "Never Too Late but Always Too Early III" – 17:22
4. "Half-Hearted Beast" – 7:41

== Personnel ==
- Peter Brötzmann – tenor saxophone, tárogató, alto clarinet
- William Parker – double bass, ngoni
- Hamid Drake – drums
