= Scrapbook (album) =

Studio album by William Parker Violin Trio
- Released: June 17, 2003
- Recorded: May 2002
- Studio: Strobe-Light Studio, NYC
- Genre: Jazz
- Length: 40:38
- Label: Thirsty Ear; THI57133-2
- Producer: William Parker

William Parker chronology
| Eloping with the Sun (2003) | Scrapbook (2003) | Spontaneous (2003) |

Scrapbook is an album by American jazz bassist and composer William Parker's Violin Trio featuring Billy Bang which was recorded in 2002 and released on the Thirsty Ear label.

== Reception ==
Professional ratings
Review scores
| Source | Rating |
|---|---|
| AllMusic | 4/5 stars |
| The Penguin Guide to Jazz | 3.5/4 stars |

In his review for AllMusic, Thom Jurek states "This is a restrained and lovely album that possesses real firepower in places, but it's almost never necessary because the level of communication runs so deep between these players that everything feels light as a breeze, poignant as a memory, and as fresh as a wound" The Penguin Guide to Jazz observed "There is plenty of open improvisation to be found but it's the structure of these six songs that is intriguing".

The All About Jazz review said the album "combines the raw sounds of the blues, spirituals, and funk with a keen sense of adventurous experimentation". JazzTimes enthused "This CD can easily sit alongside Parker's recent and equally brilliant quartet recording, O'Neal's Porch".

== Track listing ==
All compositions by William Parker.

1. "Scrapbook" - 8:02
2. "Sunday Morning Church" - 11:31
3. "Singing Spirits" - 5:00
4. "Dust on a White Shirt" - 5:06
5. "Urban" - 7:24
6. "Holiday for Flowers" - 3:23

== Personnel ==
- William Parker - bass
- Billy Bang - violin
- Hamid Drake - drums
