= Matt Lavelle =

American jazz musician

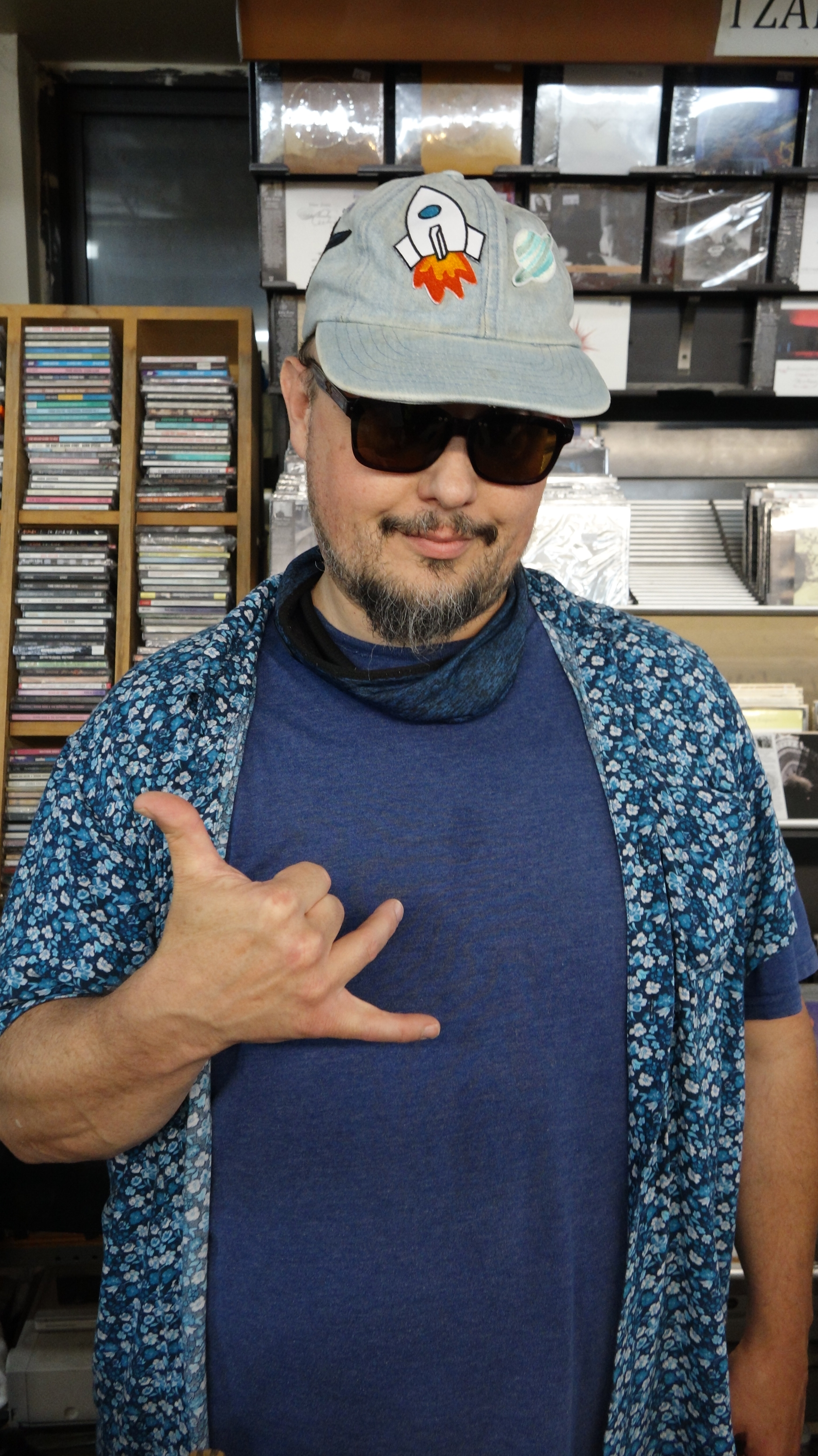
Matt Lavelle at Downtown Music Gallery

Matt Lavelle (born 1970 in Paterson, New Jersey) is an American jazz trumpet, flugelhorn, alto clarinet, and bass clarinet player.

== Career ==
Lavelle began his music career with Hildred Humphries, a swing era veteran who played with Count Basie and Billie Holiday. He has played in ensembles led by Sabir Mateen since 2002. In 2005, he began study with Ornette Coleman. Lavelle was a member of the Bern Nix quartet since 2010. He recorded with Giuseppi Logan in 2010. In 2011 he created the 12 Houses Orchestra. Lavelle is also a visual artist inspired by his Grandfather Fritz Kluber. Lavelle is author of the Substack No Sound Left Behind.

Lavelle published a book titled New York City Subway Drama and Beyond, in 2011. In 2013 he published a short story titled The Jazz Musician's Tarot Deck.

== Discography ==
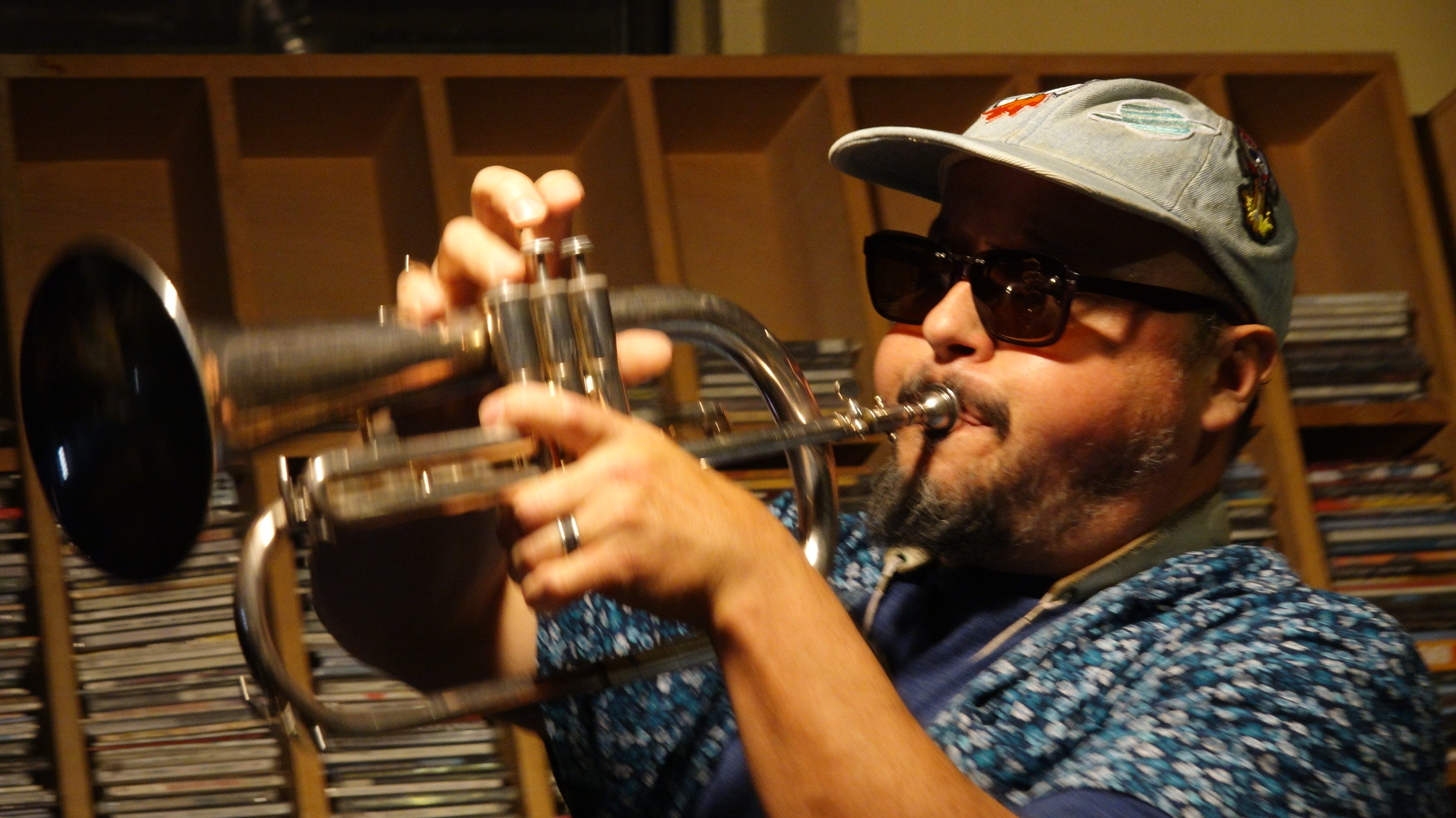
at Downtown Music Gallery

As a leader

- The Crop Circles Suite, part 1 (Mahakala, 2024)
- Harmolodic Duke (Unseen rain, 2023)
- The House Keeper (Unseen rain, 2023)
- In Swing We Trust (Unseen Rain, 2022)
- The Big Picture (Bandcamp-self released 2020)
- Trumpet Rising Bass Clarinet Moon 2020 (Bandcamp-self released 2020)
- The Abandoned Sound (Bandcamp-self released 2020)
- Hope (Unseen Rain,2019)
- Retrograde (ESP,2018)
- The Matt Lavelle Quartet (Unseen Rain,2017)
- Matt Lavelle and the 12 Houses - End Times (Unseen rain,2017)
- Harmolodic Monk (Unseen Rain,2016)
- Matt Lavelle and the 12 Houses - Solidarity (Unseen Rain,2013)
- Goodbye New York, Hello World (Spiritual Power,2010)
- Matt Lavelle and Morcilla, the Manifestation Drama (Spiritual Power, 2008)
- Cuica In The Third House (KMB Jazz, 2007)
- Matt Lavelle Trio-Spiritual Power Silkheart, 2006
- Trumpet Rising, Bass Clarinet Moon (Spiritual Power, 2003)
- Handling The Moment (CIMP, 2002)

With Sumari

- Sumari (Unseen Rain,2014)
- Sumari II (Unseen Rain,2016)
- Sumari III (Unseen Rain, 2019)
- Before Testo (Unseen Rain,2020)
- Sumari IV (Unseen Rain, 2021)

With Eye Contact

- Embracing the Tide (Utech, 2005)
- Making Eye Contact With God (Utech, 2005)
- War Rug (KMB Jazz, 2006)

With Daniel Carter

- Daniel Carter and Matt Lavelle the piano album (Bandcamp-self released 2020)
- Daniel Carter and Matt Lavelle live at Tower Records (Antnimara, 2006)
- Daniel Carter and Matt Lavelle (Spiritual Power, 2004)

With Bern Nix

- Negative Capability (Kitchen Records,2013)

With Giuseppi Logan

- The Giuseppi Logan Quintet (Tompkins Square, 2010)
- Giuseppi Logan live in concert in 2009 (Bandcamp- self released 11/22)

with Matana Roberts

- Coin Coin Chapter Five: In the Garden (Constellation, 2023)

With William Hooker

- Red (Gaffer Records, 2014)
- Jubilation (Org Music, 2025)

With Francois Grillot

- Francois Kitchen, duets with Francois Grillot (bandcamp-self released 11/22)

With Steve Swell

- This Now! (Cadence, 2005)
- Live at the Bowery Poetry Club (Ayler, 2006)
- Business of Here (Cadence, 2012)

With Sabir Mateen

- Prophecies Come To Pass (577 records, 2006)
- The Jubilee ensemble (Not Two, 2007)

With Ras Moshe

- Into the Openess (Music Now, 2002)
- Schematic (Jump Arts, 2002)
- Live Spirits (Utech, 2005)
- Sparks Trio- Short Stories In Sound (Utech, 2006)

With Assif Tsahar

- The Labyrinth (Hopscotch, 2003)
- Embracing the void (Hopscotch, 2003)

With William Parker

- Irving Stone memorial concert (Tzadik)
- Spontaneous (Splasc(H), 2002)
- For Percy Heath (Victo, 2006)
- Essence of Ellington (Centering, 2012)
- Universal Tonality (Aum Fidelity, 2022)
- Migration of silence into and out of the Tone World (Aum Fidelity, 2021)

With Charles Waters

- Peace Forms One (Nurecords,2017)
- Brass Mass (Nurecords, 2002)

With Barry Chabala

- I Like to Play (Roeba Records, 2007)

With Earth People

- Waking the living (Undivided vision, 2001)

With Allen Lowe

- We Will Gather When We Gather, featuring Hamiet Bluiett (Constant Sorrow, 2015)

With D3

- D3 + 1.1 (Unseen Rain, 2019)

With Julie Lyon

- Moonflower (Unseen Rain, 2016)
- Julie (Unseen Rain, 2017)

With Tom Cabrera

- Hathor (Woodshedd, 2020)
- Invocation with Ras Moshe (Woodshedd, 2021)

With The cooperative sound

- Cooperative Sound #3 (Nendo Dango, 2017)

With Stars Like Fleas

- The Ken Burns Effect (2007, Talitres Records in Europe) (May 20, 2008 Hometapes, distribution via Absolutely Kosher/Misra)

With Eric Plaks

- The Orbora Tree Suite (Darkfyre, 2022)

With Pete Dennis

- Live At Abyssinia by 99 Futures (Search for the Infinite Light, 2023)
