= Summer Freeze =

Summer Freeze may refer to:

- "Summer Freeze", track from the 2001 album Leaves Turn Inside You by Unwound
- "念夏 Summer Freeze", 2017 single by singer Sun Sheng Xi
- Mountain Dew Summer Freeze, a Mountain Dew flavor of soft drink

== See also ==
- Summer Snow (disambiguation)
