= From Valley to Valley =

Live album by Peter Brötzmann, Roy Campbell Jr., William Parker, and Hamid Drake
- Released: 1999
- Recorded: July 25, 1998
- Venue: Bezanson recital hall, Amherst, MA
- Genre: Free jazz
- Label: Eremite Records; MTE018
- Producer: Michael Ehlers

From Valley to Valley is a live album by the Die Like a Dog Quartet: saxophonist Peter Brötzmann, trumpeter Roy Campbell Jr. (substituting for Toshinori Kondo), bassist William Parker, and drummer Hamid Drake. It was recorded in July 1998 at the Fire in the Valley festival held at the University of Massachusetts Amherst's Bezanson recital hall in Amherst, Massachusetts, and was released in 1999 by Eremite Records.

== Reception ==
Professional ratings
Review scores
Source	Rating
AllMusic	4.5/5 stars
The Penguin Guide to Jazz	3.5/4 stars

In a review for AllMusic, Steve Loewy wrote: "From the perspective of free-style jazz, it does not get much better than this, the group totally in sync... From any perspective, this very tight, highly disciplined unit is one of the leading ventures in the history of avant-garde jazz."

The authors of the Penguin Guide to Jazz Recordings awarded the albums 3 1/2 stars, stating: "Campbell has no problem with the turbulent setting, but he does bring a boppish feel to some of his parts."

A reviewer for All About Jazz commented: "The relative tightness of the rhythm section helps anchor the wild, unrestrained freedom of the front line... As you might not expect, there is a wide variety of moods here, from exuberant to curious to contemplative. You might even have to turn up the volume in a couple of places."

Author Todd S. Jenkins noted the album's "brutal energy," and stated: "The session illustrates the cellular level of intuition and listening among the performers, including a 'finishing of the sentences' comparable to that between Ornette Coleman and Don Cherry."

== Track listing ==
Composed by the Die Like a Dog Quartet.

1. "I" – 16:40
2. "Announcement" – 1:27
3. "II" – 40:02
4. "Encore" – 10:07

== Personnel ==
- Peter Brötzmann – alto saxophone, tenor saxophone, clarinet, tarogato
- Roy Campbell Jr. – flugelhorn, trumpet, pocket trumpet
- William Parker – double bass
- Hamid Drake – drums, percussion
