= Live at the Empty Bottle =

Live album by Peter Brötzmann, Hamid Drake, and Kent Kessler
- Released: 1999
- Recorded: July 22, 1996
- Venue: The Empty Bottle, Chicago
- Genre: Free jazz
- Length: 58:06
- Label: Okka Disk; ODL10005
- Producer: Andrew Choate, Bruno Johnson, John Corbett

Live at the Empty Bottle is a live album by saxophonist Peter Brötzmann, drummer Hamid Drake, and bassist Kent Kessler. It was recorded on July 22, 1996, at The Empty Bottle in Chicago, and was released in 1999 by Okka Disk as a limited-edition CD.

In his liner notes, David Grubbs wrote: "Reader, where do you live? Do people where you live stand up and whistle and scream and holler at gigs of improvised music? Give it up for the rhythm section, and give it up for their awesome boogie force. I'm serious. I was there; I was dancing."

== Reception ==
Professional ratings
Review scores
Source	Rating
AllMusic	3/5 stars
The Penguin Guide to Jazz	3.5/4 stars
The Virgin Encyclopedia of Jazz	3/5 stars

In a review for AllMusic, Joslyn Layne wrote: "Excellent, energetic solos (and interplay) are heard from every musician."

The authors of The Penguin Guide to Jazz Recordings called the album "an hour of top music," and stated: "Brötz sounds both passionate and cheery... Drake isn't a muscleman drummer, but the leader has had so many of those behind him over the years that Hamid's more tractable, polymorphous sound is a source of refreshment: there's nothing wanting."

Derek Taylor of One Final Note commented: "Uncapped for your pleasure, the heady aromas of Brötzmann's horns ferment with bass and trap set in a combination so beguiling it may prove difficult to resist rapturous inebriation at their hands. Like the fine vodka that is one of the German's few admitted passions this performance packs a pungent bite and deserves to be sipped and savored at length."

== Track listing ==
1. "Something from Your Heart" – 17:04
2. "Crest of the Wave" – 41:02

== Personnel ==
- Peter Brötzmann – reeds
- Kent Kessler – bass
- Hamid Drake – drums
