= Requiem (William Parker album) =

Live album by William Parker Bass Quartet featuring Charles Gayle
- Released: 2006
- Recorded: May 31, 2004
- Venue: Vision Festival, The Center, St. Patrick's Old Cathedral, New York City
- Genre: Jazz
- Length: 65:38
- Label: Splasc(H); CDH 885.2

William Parker chronology
| Luc's Lantern (2004) | Requiem (2006) | Sound Unity (2005) |

Requiem is a live album by bassist and composer William Parker's Bass Quartet featuring Charles Gayle, which was recorded at the Vision Festival in New York in 2004 and released on the Italian Splasc(H) label.

== Reception ==
The All About Jazz review stated "The group's significance stemmed from the stylistic lineage evident from Grimes to Silva to Sirone to Parker and the addition of guest saxophonist Charles Gayle added a wrinkle, an uncommon hierarchy with a horn playing over four bassists".

== Track listing ==
All compositions by William Parker

1. "Four Strings Inside a Tree" - 7:08
2. "When All Is Sad" - 4:59
3. "For Wilber Morris" - 4:48
4. "The Little Smile" - 4:16
5. "Sky Came" - 4:42
6. "Heaven" - 4:16
7. "Blues in the Hour Glass" - 8:10
8. "Shores of Kansas" - 2:51
9. "Spirits Inside the Bright House" - 9:08
10. "Bermuda/Atlanta/Philadelphia/Bronx" - 11:34
11. "The Last Song" - 3:46

== Personnel ==
- William Parker, Alan Silva, Henry Grimes, Sirone - bass
- Charles Gayle - alto saxophone
