= Double Sunrise Over Neptune =

Live album by William Parker & The Little Huey Creative Music Orchestra
- Released: 2008
- Recorded: June 20, 2007
- Venue: Vision Festival, Angel Orensanz Foundation, New York City
- Genre: Jazz, free jazz
- Length: 65:48
- Label: AUM Fidelity; AUM 047
- Producer: William Parker

William Parker chronology
Alphaville Suite (2007)	Double Sunrise Over Neptune (2008)	Petit Oiseau (2007)

Double Sunrise Over Neptune is a live album by American jazz musician and composer William Parker, which was recorded in 2007 and originally released on the AUM Fidelity label. Though best known as a bassist, Parker on this album plays various ethnic double reed instruments and the African stringed instrument doussn'gouni.

== Reception ==
Professional ratings
Review scores
Source	Rating
AllMusic	4.5/5 stars

In his review for AllMusic, Michael G. Nastos describes the album as perhaps the best of Parker's career, writing: "One who listens closely, and more than once, will reap great rewards from this, another excellent document in the growing and substantive discography of the consistently forward thinking Parker".

The All About Jazz review noted "One of Parker's most fully realized large ensemble recordings, Double Sunrise Over Neptune is cosmic groove music with a global flair—a seamless merger of Eastern and Western traditions conveyed with passionate conviction". The JazzTimes review by Brent Burton commented "this groovy large ensemble recording acknowledges that a little freedom goes a long way. The occasional explosion of brass-and-string squall is more or less leavened by a cool-blue pulse"

== Track listing ==
All compositions by William Parker

1. "Morning Mantra" – 15:08
2. "Lights of Lake George" – 27:24
3. "O'Neal's Bridge" – 0:37
4. "Neptune's Mirror" – 22:39

== Personnel ==
- William Parker – double reeds, doussn'gouni, conductor
- Sabir Mateen – tenor saxophone, clarinet
- Rob Brown – alto saxophone
- Bill Cole – double reeds
- Dave Sewelson – baritone saxophone
- Lewis Barnes – trumpet
- Joe Morris – guitar, banjo
- Sangeeta Bandyopadhyay – vocals
- Jason Kao Hwang, Mazz Swift – violin
- Jessica Pavone – viola
- Shiau-Shu Yu – cello
- Brahim Frigbane – oud
- Shayna Dulberger – bass
- Hamid Drake, Gerald Cleaver – drums
