= Little Birds Have Fast Hearts =

1998 live album

Live album by Peter Brötzmann, Toshinori Kondo, William Parker, and Hamid Drake
- Released: 1998 and 1999
- Recorded: November 7–9, 1997
- Venue: Podewil, Berlin
- Genre: Free jazz
- Label: FMP; CD 97 (No. 1); CD 101 (No. 2)
- Producer: Jost Gebers, Peter Brötzmann

No. 2 cover

Little Birds Have Fast Hearts, Nos. 1 and 2, is a pair of live albums by the Die Like a Dog Quartet: saxophonist Peter Brötzmann, trumpeter Toshinori Kondo, bassist William Parker, and drummer Hamid Drake. The albums were recorded in November 1997 at the 30th "Total Music Meeting" held at the Podewil in Berlin, and were released in 1998 (No. 1) and 1999 (No. 2) by FMP.

In the liner notes to the first album, Alan Warner wrote: "this music it wont be, shant be taken from you and brutalised and stolen, they cant take this brave, honest music and use it to sell whisky and car tyres in our plastic, MTV satellite old madame Europe, like your childhood memories this music is both safe and dangerous at the same time." [sic]

In 2007, the albums were reissued as part of the compilation Die Like a Dog Quartet: The Complete FMP Recordings.

== Reception ==
Professional ratings
Review scores
Source	Rating
AllMusic No. 1	4.5/5 stars
AllMusic No. 2	4.5/5 stars
The Penguin Guide to Jazz	4/4 stars

The albums were included in The Wire's 1998 and 1999 year-end Rewinds listing 50 notable recordings.

Regarding the 1998 release, AllMusic reviewer Joslyn Lane wrote: "there is no 'casual' mode, there is no collapsing into old forms, this is a work-out, and all four musicians give 100 percent as they are known to do. This is not music for people wanting to hear some nice jazz, some hum-along-able standards; this is music for listeners who want to take a journey and are willing to let this quartet steer." Concerning the 1999 release, Lane stated: "Little Birds Have Fast Hearts, No. 2 complements the first volume, including more of this quartet's excellent interplay and self-feeding energy."

The authors of the Penguin Guide to Jazz Recordings awarded the albums 4 stars, calling Parker and Drake "the best 'rhythm section' Brötz has had for years." They commented: "Kondo, one of the most unfettered and genie-like spirits in free playing, is far too seldom encountered in this kind of situation now and his madcap sounds are the heat-haze high-altitude counter to Peter's massive, earth-rooted oratory."

Author Todd S. Jenkins stated: "all is spontaneously improvised and absolutely frenetic. Parker and Drake pave the way with brisk turns and spills, trying to trip up the dextrous hornmen with little success. On the second volume, Brötzmann stretches out on both clarinet and tarogato, complementing the cloudless pitch of Kondo's trumpet."

Peter Margasak, in a 1999 article for the Chicago Reader, called the albums "the best work I've heard from any of Brotzmann's ensembles in five years," and remarked: "Kondo adapts the dark, smeary sound of Miles's better electric albums..., stripping off the funky grooves and running them through Brotzmann and Parker's sublimely muscular improvisational wringer."

== Track listing ==
Composed by Peter Brötzmann.

=== No. 1 ===
1. "Part 1" – 45:45
2. "Part 2" – 21:59

=== No. 2 ===
1. "Part 3" – 20:19
2. "Part 4" – 25:41
3. "Part 5" – 8:48
4. "Part 6" – 4:25

== Personnel ==
- Peter Brötzmann – tenor saxophone, tárogató, clarinet
- Toshinori Kondo – trumpet, electronics
- William Parker – double bass
- Hamid Drake – drums
