= Painter's Spring =

Studio album by William Parker Trio
- Released: June 20, 2000
- Recorded: April 2, 2000; Strobe-Light Studio, NYC
- Genre: Jazz
- Length: 44:42
- Label: Thirsty Ear; THI 57088-2
- Producer: Matthew Shipp

William Parker chronology
Mayor of Punkville (1999)	Painter's Spring (2000)	Piercing the Veil (2000)

Painter's Spring is an album by American jazz bassist and composer William Parker's Trio, featuring saxophonist Daniel Carter and drummer Hamid Drake, which was recorded in 2000 and released on the Thirsty Ear label.

== Reception ==
Professional ratings
Review scores
Source	Rating
AllMusic	4.5/5 stars
The Penguin Guide to Jazz Recordings	3/4 stars

In her review for AllMusic, Paula Edelstein states " Painter's Spring by the William Parker Trio sustains the living bolt of energy infused in the free and avant-garde jazz genres ... this program pierces the veil of avant-garde and free jazz mystery" PopMatters' review noted "Painter’s Spring is more creative and interesting than what passes for new jazz on most major record labels, and is the product of a trio of gifted musicians who tackle sounds old and new with not only skill but also a dose of imagination". The All About Jazz review noted "The beauty of this record is that it bears obvious appeal to free jazz newbies, or listeners coming from more traditional contexts. Hopefully this vehicle will transport many listeners into the depth of musical expression that is William Parker. It's certainly among the greatest pieces of work he's put out". JazzTimes stated "the set has a decidedly cool aspect that is most inviting".

== Track listing ==
All compositions by William Parker except as indicated

1. "Foundation #1" - 7:47
2. "Come Sunday" (Duke Ellington) - 5:48
3. "Blues for Percy" - 5:26
4. "Flash" - 4:54
5. "There Is a Balm in Gilead" (Traditional) - 3:36
6. "Foundation #4" - 5:50
7. "Foundation #2" - 9:26
8. "Trilog" - 1:55

== Personnel ==
- William Parker - bass
- Daniel Carter - alto saxophone, tenor saxophone, flute, clarinet
- Hamid Drake - drums
