= Wood Flute Songs =

Live album by William Parker
- Released: November 12, 2013
- Recorded: May 24, 2006 at Yoshi's in Oakland, California, January 3, 2007 at Systems Two Studio, Brooklyn, April 7, 2007 at DiverseWorks in Houston, Texas, June 15, 2009 at Angel Orensanz Foundation, NYC, April 6, 2011 at AMR Jazz Festival in Geneva, Switzerland, June 9, 2012 at Roulette in Brooklyn
- Genre: Jazz
- Length: 569:14
- Label: AUM Fidelity; AUM 080-87
- Producer: William Parker and Steven Joerg

William Parker chronology
Essence of Ellington (2012)	Wood Flute Songs (2013)

Wood Flute Songs (subtitled Anthology/Live 2006–2012) is an eight-CD box set by bassist and composer William Parker which was recorded in California in 2006, Houston in 2007, Geneva and Montreal in 2011and New York in 2009 and 2012, and released on the AUM Fidelity label.

== Reception ==
Professional ratings
Review scores
Source	Rating
AllMusic	4/5 stars
The Guardian	4/5 stars

AllMusic awarded the album 4 stars stating "Wood Flute Songs is of exceptional quality and breadth even in its more difficult moments; it belongs the collection of every serious fan of new jazz". The Guardian observed "Of course it's something of a free-jazz purist's specialist item, but a wider audience might be startled by how much captivating melody dances amid the collective-improv clamour". The All About Jazz review noted "What must have convinced label chief Steven Joerg to release these live dates was the opportunity to witness the energy and uninhibited joy which these four musicians create in a live setting". JazzTimes noted "this eight-CD live box is a magnificent document that captures one of jazz's greatest, most prolific and most versatile bandleaders at the height of his powers, demonstrating a stunning range of creativity with a superb cast of musicians".

== Track listing ==
All compositions by William Parker except as noted

Disc One: Live at Yoshi's 2006 (1st Set) - Quartet

1. "Tears for the Children of Rwanda" - 25:12
2. "Petit Oiseau" - 15:01
3. "Groove #7 - 14:19
4. "Hopi Spirits" - 14:44

Disc Two: Live at Yoshi's 2006 (2nd Set) - Quartet

1. Wood Flute Song"- 21:14
2. "Alphaville / Daughter's Joy / The Golden Bell" - 42:37
3. "Malachi's Mode" - 11:47

Disc Three: Live in Houston 2007 (1st Set) - Quartet

1. "Groove #7 - 11:14
2. "Hawaii" - 9:32
3. "Broken Roofs / Green Paper" - 12:57
4. "Hamid's Groove / Daughter's Joy" - 21:17
5. "Malachi's Mode" - 7:00
6. "Corn Meal Dance" - 2:51
7. "Corn Meal Dance" [from Yoshi's 2006] - 8:49

Disc Four: Live in Houston 2007 (2nd Set) - Quartet

1. "O'Neal's Porch" - 9:52
2. "Red Desert" - 9:15
3. "Ojibway Song" - 14:31
4. "Sunrise in the Tone World" - 6:25
5. "The Square Sun" - 7:12
6. "Etchings" (Drake/Parker) - 9:39
7. "Ascent of the Big Spirit" - 8:38
8. "Moon" [from Yoshi's 2006] - 8:58

Disc Five: Light Cottage Draped in a Curtain of Blues - Septet

1. "O'Neal's Porch" - 13:42
2. "Daughter's Joy" - 11:35
3. "Gilmore's Hat" - 7:14
4. "Deep Flower / Ascent of the Big Spirit" - 17:11
5. "Wood Flute Song" - 6:10
6. "Chicago" [from AMR 2011] - 9:05

Disc Six: Creation - Ensemble

1. "Psalm for Billy Bang" - 6:08
2. "All I Want" - 2:40
3. "Earth in Pain" - 19:03
4. "Deep Flower" - 22:46
5. "Wood Flute Song" - 18:55

Disc Seven: Friday Afternoon - Raining on the Moon

1. "3+3 = Jackie McLean" - 13:33
2. "My Name is Peace" - 13:40
3. "Late Man of This Planet" - 9:01
4. "For Abbey Lincoln" - 16:05
5. "Boom Boom Bang Bang" - 14:38
6. "Sweet Breeze" - 5:05

Disc Eight: Kalaparusha on the Edge of the Horizon - In Order to Survive

1. "Aquixo Waiting at Dark Corridor" - 9:01
2. "Falling Promise" - 9:30
3. "Slipping Into the Light" - 6:40
4. "Shadows Arms Waving" - 15:06
5. "Theme for Rondo Hattan" - 16:50
6. "Prayer-Improv" [outtake from Corn Meal Dance session] - 5:53
7. "Great Spirit" [outtake from Corn Meal Dance session] - 6:44

== Personnel ==
- William Parker - bass
- Lewis Barnes - trumpet
- Rob Brown - alto saxophone
- Hamid Drake - drums

With:

- Billy Bang - violin (Disc Five, tracks 1–5)
- Bobby Bradford - cornet (Disc Five, tracks 1–5)
- James Spaulding - alto saxophone (Disc Five, tracks 1–5)
- Eri Yamamoto - piano (Disc Seven and Disc Eight, tracks 6 & 7)
- Leena Conquest - vocals (Disc Seven and Disc Eight, tracks 6 & 7)
- Cooper-Moore - piano (Disc Eight, tracks 1–5)

AMR Ensemble (Dísc Six and Disc Five, track 6)

- Massimo Pinca - bass
- Aina Rakotobe - baritone sax
- Ernie Odoom - voice
- Ludovic Lagana - trumpet
- Philippe Ehinger - bass clarinet
- Maurice Magnoni - soprano saxophone
- Manu Gesseney - alto saxophone
- Stéphane Métraux - tenor saxophone
