= CT: The Dance Project =

Live album by Cecil Taylor
- Released: 2008
- Recorded: July 8, 1990
- Venue: Akademie der Kunste, Berlin
- Genre: Jazz
- Length: 39:16
- Label: FMP
- Producer: Jost Gebers

CT: The Dance Project is a live album by Cecil Taylor recorded during the Summer Music concert series at the Akademie der Kunste, Berlin on July 8, 1990, and released in 2008 by FMP. The album documents a multimedia event that featured Taylor, bassist William Parker, percussionist Masashi Harada, and a group of four dancers.

Taylor's fascination with dance dated back to his youth, when he saw The Four Step Brothers and Baby Laurence. In the early 1950s, he worked with Bill Bailey and Buck Washington of Buck and Bubbles, and he would later go on to collaborate with a variety of choreographers and dancers, such as Dianne McIntyre, Heather Watts, Mikhail Baryshnikov, Min Tanaka, and Cheryl Banks-Smith. One of Taylor's most frequently quoted statements is "I try to imitate on the piano the leaps in space a dancer makes".

The album liner notes provide a recollection of the first few minutes of the event:

Rustling and rattling in the background. Three musicians creeping about, a scene which turns into a ritual for a few moments. Voices communicating with each other – way beyond words. Steps which merge into a sequence of images and sounds, before the first key of the piano has been struck. From the far back of the room four dancers advance with wave-like movements... The combination of music and dance, mirroring each other, mutual inspiration. After the rustling beginning with sparse gestures, voices and percussive sounds, the three musicians formed into the trio...

== Reception ==
Professional ratings
Review scores
Source	Rating
AllMusic	3.5/5 stars

In his AllMusic review, arwulf arwulf awarded the album 3.5 stars, commenting: "This recording, like the event which it documents, transcends all notions and parameters of conventional presentation, let alone entertainment. There is a sense that the artists are tapping into something infinitely older, more vast and enduring than what usually passes for culture in mainstream media. 'Art did not begin with us,' quoth Cecil, 'it was here before we got here.'" Writing for All About Jazz, Marc Medwin stated that the album "presents a more introspective side of [Taylor's] art, an aspect discussed too infrequently." He commented: "The sound-world is sparer than much of Taylor's work of the period... even the densest moments on Dance Project are somehow replete with space. Masashi Harada's playing accounts for much of the novel aesthetic, his touch light and his interjections fewer than those of other drummers in Taylor's orbit. Harada's approach to sound is beautifully aphoristic, a well-placed roll or cymbal stroke speaking volumes in his hands. Even at the moments of highest drama, when Taylor leaves predetermined structure for free flight, Harada's playing is astutely reactive... Bassist William Parker and Taylor's symbiotic relationship is beautifully captured here... Taylor's approach brings the most surprise and enjoyment. While the percussive nature of his work gets the most attention, he commands every detail of each note he plays. His virtuosity here is attendant to his sense of detail, as he executes gorgeous tremolos and exquisite glissandi, the angular arpeggiations more meaningful as a result of the seemingly limitless timbral variety with which they are contextualized."

Reviewer Henry Smith wrote: "the whole of the album is marked by a distinct sense of restraint, highlighting interaction and careful mood setting rather than dynamic buildups and dramatic delivery. The result... is an angular work whose flow is marked as much by the spaces between the musicians and their individual sound worlds as by the tautness of the unit's delivery. It is a compelling and creative work that bubbles with spontaneity as the musicians sonically move among themselves and their dancing counterparts." In a review for Temporary Fault, Massimo Ricci wrote: "the exceptional meshing of technical adroitness and physical boldness that this performance offers is something to literally contemplate and remain astonished at. Following a classic Taylor approach – utterances and exclamations preceding the contact with the instruments – the trio launches a succession of purposeful explorations of dynamics, immediately acclimatizing to the live environment (which of course featured a dance act on the stage) and eliciting a chain of reciprocal visceral responses from the musicians, who move across the borders of a murderous elegance to arrive at the perfect synthesis of bodily expression and meaningful eloquence. Intellectualism is thoroughly annihilated, Taylor's fragmented fluency shifting the centre of attention between persistence and venomous ardour, Parker confident and perspicacious at once, Harada only apparently in the background yet ready to let his influence be felt without any need of sounding thunderous."

== Track listing ==
All compositions by Cecil Taylor

A: Astral Fluid on the Earth

1. "Looking Into The Universe" - 11:00
2. "Emerging From The Cosmic Exterial" - 4:19

B: Soul Activities

1. "Feeling" - 12:12
2. "Willing" - 11:45
- Recorded at the Akademie der Kunste, Berlin on July 8, 1990

== Personnel ==
- Cecil Taylor - piano, voice
- William Parker - bass
- Masashi Harada - percussion
