= Raincoat in the River =

Live album by William Parker & the Little Huey Creative Music Orchestra
- Released: 2002
- Recorded: February 23, 2001
- Venue: ICA Theater, Boston, MA
- Genre: Jazz
- Length: 59:18
- Label: Eremite; MTE-36
- Producer: Michael Ehlers

William Parker chronology
Bob's Pink Cadillac (2001)	Raincoat in the River (2002)	Raining on the Moon (2002)

Raincoat in the River is a live album by bassist and composer William Parker's Little Huey Creative Music Orchestra, which was recorded in Boston in 2001 and released on the Eremite label.

== Reception ==
Professional ratings
Review scores
Source	Rating
AllMusic	3.5/5 stars
The Penguin Guide to Jazz Recordings	3/4 stars

The AllMusic awarded the album 3½ stars.

== Track listing ==
All compositions by William Parker

1. "Five Rivers into One Teardrop I: Meditation for Two Voices" – 9:47
2. "Five Rivers into One Teardrop II: Mountain/Maintain" – 10:00
3. "Five Rivers into One Teardrop III: Anast Crossing the Lake of Light" – 9:52
4. "Five Rivers into One Teardrop IV: Raincoat in the River" – 19:41
5. "Five Rivers into One Teardrop V: Painter's Celebration" – 9:58

== Personnel ==
- William Parker – bass, marimba, shakuhachi, bombard
- Roy Campbell, Jr. – trumpet, flugelhorn
- Lewis Barnes, Richard Rodriguez – trumpet
- Masahiko Kono, Alex Lodico, Steve Swell – trombone
- Darryl Foster – tenor saxophone, soprano saxophone
- Ori Kaplan, Rob Brown – alto saxophone
- Charles Waters – alto saxophone, clarinet
- Dave Sewelson – baritone saxophone
- Dave Hofstra – tuba
- Leena Conquest – vocals
- Shia-Shu Yu – cello
- Andrew Barker, Guillermo E. Brown – drums
