= Luc's Lantern =

Studio album by William Parker
- Released: March 22, 2005
- Recorded: 2004
- Studio: Park West Studios, Brooklyn, New York City
- Genre: Jazz
- Length: 46:32
- Label: Thirsty Ear; THI 57158-2
- Producer: Peter Gordon

William Parker chronology
Spontaneous (2003)	Luc's Lantern (2005)	Requiem (2006)

Luc's Lantern is an album by bassist and composer William Parker which was recorded in 2004 and released on the Thirsty Ear label.

== Reception ==
Professional ratings
Review scores
Source	Rating
Pitchfork	7/10
The Penguin Guide to Jazz Recordings	3.5/4 stars

The AllMusic review states: "Luc's Lantern is something of a departure--it's a piano trio session that evokes the poignant lyricism and straightforward intimacy of 1960s works by Bill Evans, Herbie Hancock, and Monty Alexander. While there are indeed "free" moments, Lantern, on the whole, shines a contemplative, relaxing, and slightly melancholy light".

Pitchfork observed "with its adroit, seemingly effortless take on traditionalism, Luc's Lantern should prove to be as accessible a point of entry as a newcomer could hope for, and as a refreshing, uncomplicated rear-view glance for Parker's established jazz audience".

JazzTimes noted "the three musicians show a restraint that's all the more admirable for sounding unstudied".

The All About Jazz review said "This amazing trio sounds as if it is a working trio—fresh, relaxed, and assured, and with great affinity towards Parker's rhythmic leadership. Hopefully it will become a regular working trio, maturing with future releases".

== Track listing ==
All compositions by William Parker

1. "Adena" – 5:12
2. "Song for Tyler" – 4:18
3. "Mourning Sunset" – 7:09
4. "Evening Star Song" – 3:33
5. "Luc's Lantern" – 6:33
6. "Jaki" – 4:17
7. "Bud in Alphaville" – 3:35
8. "Charcoal Flower" – 5:13
9. "Phoenix" – 5:28
10. "Candlesticks on the Lake" – 1:20

== Personnel ==
- William Parker – bass
- Eri Yamamoto – piano
- Michael Thompson – drums
