= Spontaneous (album) =

Live album by William Parker & the Little Huey Creative Music Orchestra
- Released: 2003
- Recorded: May 29, 2002; CBGB's, NYC
- Genre: Jazz
- Length: 61:45
- Label: Splasc(H); CDH 855.2
- Producer: Giorgio Mortarino

William Parker chronology
Scrapbook (2002)	Spontaneous (2003)	Luc's Lantern (2004)

Spontaneous is a live album by bassist and composer William Parker's Little Huey Creative Music Orchestra, which was recorded at the Vision Festival in New York in 2002 and released on the Italian Splasc(H) label.

== Reception ==
Professional ratings
Review scores
Source	Rating
AllMusic	4/5 stars
The Penguin Guide to Jazz Recordings	3/4 stars

AllMusic awarded the album 4 stars stating "Those who enjoy big-band abstractions immersed in wild, loud, and abrasive surroundings – 1960s style – should appreciate the freestyle energy emanating from the orchestra... the uninitiated will likely find this all overwhelmingly imposing, but the rewards are numerous for the disciplined listener who takes the time to listen closely". Jazz Review noted "Parker leads his band-mates through torrid swing vamps and variable pulses, yet the music is a study in perpetual motion guided by the soloists’ blaring lines. A high-octane effort for sure, although there’s a noticeable bonding process that occurs, which is a trait that has become a staple of this unit’s line of attack".

== Track listing ==
All compositions by William Parker

1. "Spontaneous Flowers" - 28:55
2. "Spontaneous Mingus" - 32:50

== Personnel ==
- William Parker - bass
- Roy Campbell, Jr. - trumpet, flugelhorn
- Lewis Barnes, Matt Lavelle - trumpet
- Dick Griffin, Masahiko Kono, Alex Lodico, Steve Swell - trombone
- Dave Hofstra - tuba
- Sabir Mateen - tenor saxophone
- Rob Brown - alto saxophone, flute
- Charles Waters - alto saxophone, clarinet
- Ori Kaplan - alto saxophone
- Darryl Foster - tenor saxophone, soprano saxophone
- Dave Sewelson - baritone saxophone
- Andrew Barker, Guillermo E. Brown - drums
