= Eloping with the Sun =

Live album by William Parker, Joe Morris & Hamid Drake
- Released: January 21, 2003
- Recorded: December 12, 2001
- Venue: AUM HQ, Brooklyn, New York City
- Genre: Jazz
- Length: 55:36
- Label: Riti; CD 007
- Producer: Joe Morris

William Parker chronology
| Raining on the Moon (2001) | Eloping with the Sun (2003) | Scrapbook (2003) |

Eloping with the Sun is an album by William Parker, Joe Morris & Hamid Drake which was recorded in 2001 and released in a limited edition on Morris' Riti label.

== Reception ==
Professional ratings
Review scores
| Source | Rating |
|---|---|
| AllMusic | 4/5 stars |
| The Penguin Guide to Jazz Recordings | 2.5/4 stars |

In his review for AllMusic, Eugene Chadbourne states "Three musicians who play together regularly, much of their music totally improvised, get together for another recording session that will feature not their normal instruments but a variation that is deliberately stripped quite bare... This instrumental concept means a much less heavy type of assault than is usual for these artists, yet this becomes a special treasure, a demonstration of expressive mastery"

The All About Jazz review said "The surprise in the pairing of these three creative music superstars is not that they have finally recorded together. The astonishing thing about Eloping With The Sun is the music they decided to make". JazzTimes noted "Morris has plenty of solo space on the disc, as Drake and Parker content themselves with setting a groove and sticking with it for minutes on end. The heart of the music is Drake and Parker's slowly evolving rhythms, however, which leaves Morris standing off to the side".

== Track listing ==
All compositions by William Parker, Joe Morris and Hamid Drake

1. "Sand Choir" - 7:59
2. "Dawn Son" - 2:04
3. "Hop-kin" - 16:49
4. "Stepdance" - 12:53
5. "Dream" - 15:48

== Personnel ==
- William Parker - sintir
- Joe Morris - banjo, banjouke
- Hamid Drake - frame drum
