= Petit Oiseau =

Studio album by the William Parker Quartet
- Released: October 14, 2008
- Recorded: December 2007
- Studio: Systems Two Studio; Brooklyn, NYC
- Genre: Jazz
- Length: 70:21
- Label: AUM Fidelity; AUM 050
- Producer: William Parker

William Parker chronology
Double Sunrise Over Neptune (2007)	Petit Oiseau (2008)	Beyond Quantum (2008)

Petit Oiseau is an album by the William Parker Quartet, recorded in December 2007 and released on October 14, 2008 on AUM Fidelity.

== Reception ==
Professional ratings
Review scores
Source	Rating
AllMusic	4.5/5 stars
PopMatters	8/10 stars

The review for AllMusic stated, "Petit Oiseau should be regarded as a triumphant achievement by one of the early 21st century's strongest and most rewarding quartets."

PopMatters's review observed, "Petit Oiseau follows in a line of great recordings by the quartet, and is unrelenting in its artistic vision. They know how to let each other go out on tangents while knowing the exact time to swing, and swing hard."

All About Jazz said "A welcome return to the studio from one of today's most esteemed working groups, Petit Oiseau is one of Parker's most accessible and enjoyable releases."

The JazzTimes review noted, "No matter what they do, the William Parker Quartet shows us that avant-garde music doesn’t have to be weird and off-putting. It can even swing."

== Track listing ==
All compositions by William Parker

1. "Groove Sweet" – 18:00
2. "Talaps Theme" – 5:33
3. "Petit Oiseau" – 9:34
4. "The Golden Bell" – 6:26
5. "Four for Tommy" – 4:07
6. "Malachi's Mode" – 8:07
7. "Dust from a Mountain" – 5:56
8. "Shorter for Alan" – 12:38

== Personnel ==
- William Parker – bass, cedar flute
- Lewis Barnes – trumpet
- Rob Brown – alto saxophone, soprano clarinet
- Hamid Drake – drums, frame drum, balafon
