= The Dried Rat–Dog =

Studio album by Peter Brötzmann and Hamid Drake
- Released: 1995
- Recorded: May 24, 1994
- Studio: Sparrow Sound Design, Chicago
- Genre: Free jazz
- Label: Okka Disk; OD12004
- Producer: Hamid Drake, John Corbett, Peter Brötzmann

The Dried Rat–Dog is an album by saxophonist Peter Brötzmann and drummer Hamid Drake. It was recorded in May 1994 at Sparrow Sound Design in Chicago, and was released in 1995 by Okka Disk.

Regarding the album title, producer John Corbett wrote: "A lovely night in late April. Walking to the Hopleaf bar... Looking down one of the sidestreets Terri points at a little pet on its evening walk. 'Rat-dog,' she mumbles quietly. 'Hmm. Rat-dog. Rattenhund.' Brötzmann smiles brushing back his beard as he does when he thinks. 'Zat's not baaad! Have to check it with Hamid...but I like it.'"

== Reception ==
Professional ratings
Review scores
Source	Rating
AllMusic	4/5 stars
The Penguin Guide to Jazz	4/4 stars
Tom Hull – on the Web	B

In a review for AllMusic, Joslyn Lane called the album "a free jazz energy wallop," and stated that it "move[s] through an array of moods and approaches, but never lets up on creativity and musicianship, making The Dried Rat-Dog a must-hear for all fans of either musician, although not the best place to start for the uninitiated."

The authors of the Penguin Guide to Jazz Recordings awarded the album 4 stars, and wrote: "Drake has become a particularly perceptive and persuasive partner... Drake's rhythms have a steadier, more momentous pulse than most free-jazz drumming and his use of frame drums and tablas adds a global touch. There are six pieces, brimful of eloquent interplay, and on 'Trees Have Roots in the Earth' and 'Dark Wings Carry Off the Sky' Brötz uncorks some of his most vivid tenor-playing for some time."

Peter Margasak, writing for the Chicago Reader, described the album as "gorgeous," and remarked: "Brötzmann may draw from a wide range of moods and colors, but all of them are sharp and well articulated."

Author Todd S. Jenkins compared Drake to Han Bennink, another drummer with whom Brötzmann has frequently played and recorded, and noted: "It is only logical that Drake would prove as satisfactory a partner for Brötzmann as the Dutch genius had been. Drake is a more serious performer than Bennink, engaging in intensified coloration rather than wild-eyed humor on tracks like the tarogato feature 'It's an Angel on the Door.' On this... Brötzmann continues to prove that he is eternally full of surprises."

== Track listing ==
Composed by Hamid Drake and Peter Brötzmann.

1. "The Dried Rat-Dog" – 13:50
2. "It's an Angel on the Door" – 6:51
3. "Open Into the Unknown" – 5:17
4. "Trees Have Roots in the Earth" – 10:57
5. "Uninvited Entertainer" – 16:09
6. "Dark Wings Carry Off the Sky" – 7:21

== Personnel ==
- Peter Brötzmann – alto saxophone, tenor saxophone, clarinet, tárogató
- Hamid Drake – drums, frame drum, tabla
