= Aoyama Crows =

Live album by Peter Brötzmann, Toshinori Kondo, William Parker, and Hamid Drake
- Released: 2002
- Recorded: November 3, 1999
- Venue: Podewil, Berlin
- Genre: Free jazz
- Length: 1:10:09
- Label: FMP; CD 118
- Producer: Jost Gebers, Peter Brötzmann

Aoyama Crows is a live album by the Die Like a Dog Quartet: saxophonist Peter Brötzmann, trumpeter Toshinori Kondo, bassist William Parker, and drummer Hamid Drake. It was recorded in November 1999 at the "Total Music Meeting" held at the Podewil in Berlin, and was released in 2002 by FMP.

In the album liner notes, Brötzmann recalled the circumstances leading up to the performance: "Got up at four o'clock in the morning, somewhere in Sweden - Hamid was there, as well, we were on tour with our Chicago tentet - the flight was late - got to Berlin in the afternoon - Kondo came in from Tokyo, William from New York, so they both had their share of stress, as well. Then soundcheck, then play. Two sets, two hours. It was simply exhausting but... it just happened like that, we had to do it."

In 2007, the album was reissued as part of the compilation Die Like a Dog Quartet: The Complete FMP Recordings.

== Reception ==
Professional ratings
Review scores
| Source | Rating |
|---|---|
| AllMusic | 3/5 stars |
| The Penguin Guide to Jazz | 3.5/4 stars |

The album was included in The Wire's 2002 year-end Rewind listing 50 notable recordings.

In a review for AllMusic, François Couture wrote: "The performance... contains all the elements necessary for an enticing free improv session... Aoyama Crows is a satisfying and entertaining album -- yes, entertaining, let's not be ashamed of it, please!"

The authors of the Penguin Guide to Jazz Recordings awarded the album 3½ stars, and stated: "Brötzmann says in his notes that they played in a state of near-exhaustion; whether that makes this fierce, dark music any fiercer and darker is a matter for the listener, though one can hardly call it fatigued."

Writing for One Final Note, Derek Taylor commented: "These four may have been feeling the debilitating effects of jet lag, sleep deprivation and hunger during their performance, but these mortal ailments hardly damper the ecstatic nature of their improvisations. If anything, their collective sound is laid bare and expanded under the aegis of exhaustion as they plumb regions of expression hardly probed in the past... a meaty effort backed by plenty of thrills. Well worth the ticket price and testament to the fact that this ensemble still has much more to say."

Author Todd S. Jenkins stated that Kondo "takes an earthier path through the music this time around, grounded in the blues while still peering outward. Brötzmann's performance is more accessible as well, not to say that either has grown complacent. The heightened unity that comes from a long period of working together has simply paid off in a new comfort level, permitting the players to let down their guard and follow as friends instead of strangers."

== Track listing ==
Composed by Peter Brötzmann.

1. "Aoyama Crows, Pt. 1" – 27:45
2. "Aoyama Crows, Pt. 2" – 15:50
3. "Aoyama Crows, Pt. 3" – 22:39
4. "Aoyama Crows, Pt. 4" – 3:52

== Personnel ==
- Peter Brötzmann – tenor saxophone, clarinet, tárogató
- Toshinori Kondo – trumpet, electronics
- William Parker – double bass
- Hamid Drake – drums
