= Bob's Pink Cadillac =

Studio album by William Parker Clarinet Trio
- Released: 2002
- Recorded: January and August 2001; Strobe-Light Studio and Tonic, NYC
- Genre: Jazz
- Length: 130:24
- Label: Eremite; MTE032/033
- Producer: Michael Ehlers

William Parker chronology
O'Neal's Porch (2000)	Bob's Pink Cadillac (2002)	Raincoat in the River (2001)

Bob's Pink Cadillac is a double album by bassist and composer William Parker's Clarinet Trio, clarinetist Perry Robinson and drummer Walter Perkins, which was recorded in the studio in January 2000 and live at Tonic in August 2001 and released on the Eremite label.

== Reception ==
Professional ratings
Review scores
Source	Rating
AllMusic	4/5 stars
The Penguin Guide to Jazz Recordings	3/4 stars

In his review for AllMusic, David Dupont states "The trio session offers plenty of room for unfettered blowing, and each member takes full advantage of the format".

== Track listing ==
All compositions by William Parker

Disc One:

1. "Bob's Pink Cadillac" – 13:55
2. "Overcoat in the River" – 10:40
3. "Blue Flower" – 18:26
4. "Fence in the Snow" – 28:44

Disc Two:

1. "Ebony Fantasy I" – 14:40
2. "Ebony Fantasy II" – 13:49
3. "Ebony Fantasy III" – 9:54
4. "Ebony Fantasy IV" – 11:45
5. "Ebony Fantasy V" – 8:38

== Personnel ==
- William Parker – bass, gralle, orchestra bells, jogibaba, vocals
- Perry Robinson – clarinet, ocarina
- Walter Perkins – trap drums, vocals
