= Summer Snow =

Summer Snow may refer to:

- Summer Snow (TV series), a 2000 Japanese television drama
- Summer Snow (film), a 1995 Hong Kong comedy-drama film
- Summer Snow (album), 2007, by William Parker & Hamid Drake
- Summer Snow, a single by Ash, from the series A–Z Series
- Summer Snow (2014 film)
