= Summer Snow (album) =

Studio album by William Parker & Hamid Drake
- Released: April 10, 2007
- Recorded: September 21, 2005
- Studio: Systems Two Studio, Brooklyn, New York City
- Genre: Jazz
- Length: 52:43
- Label: AUM Fidelity; AUM 041
- Producer: Steven Joerg, William Parker, Hamid Drake

William Parker chronology
For Percy Heath (2005)	Summer Snow (2007)	Corn Meal Dance (2007)

Summer Snow is an album by bassist William Parker and drummer Hamid Drake, which was recorded in 2005 and released on the AUM Fidelity label. The album is the second volume of duets by the pair following Piercing the Veil (2001).

== Reception ==
Professional ratings
Review scores
Source	Rating
AllMusic	4/5 stars
PopMatters	8/10 stars
The Penguin Guide to Jazz Recordings	3.5/4 stars

In his review for AllMusic, Michael G. Nastos said "The album works as a whole and should be listened to all the way through for maximum enjoyment. All of our natural and otherworldly elements are at the duo's command, whether they be ethnic music sources from Asia, Africa, greater Europe, the Middle East, or the heartland of the U.S.A. This is exactly what one should expect from these masters of creative improvised music, and is delivered in spades".

The All About Jazz review noted "Summer Snow incorporates jazz improvisation into myriad ethnic traditions in a satisfyingly organic way. Blending cultures and aesthetics, this is global music in the truest sense, equal parts uncharted future and primordial past".

The JazzTimes review noted "A duo album by a bassist and drummer might not seem like a good idea, unless you consider that William Parker and Hamid Drake aren’t just a bassist and a drummer—they’re master improvisers with a jazz bias, prone to styles that encompass an assortment of folk traditions".

PopMatters stated "What Parker and Drake do together is less a string of classic jazz duets—the kind of thing, say, that Jim Hall and Bill Evans used to do—than an act of collective groove and sound that happens, almost incidentally, to be performed by jazz musicians".

== Track listing ==
All compositions by William Parker and Hamid Drake

1. "Awake, Arise" - 0:23
2. "Sky" - 7:30
3. "Earth" - 3:03
4. "Pahos" - 9:22
5. "Sifting the Dust" - 3:49
6. "Edge of Everything" - 3:31
7. "Traces of the Beloved" - 1:38
8. "Anaya Dancing" - 3:53
9. "Konte" - 11:33
10. "Faces" - 7:18
11. "Hadra" - 0:43

== Personnel ==
- William Parker - bass, water bowls, doson'ngoni, talking drum, dumbek, shakuhachi
- Hamid Drake - drums, frame drum, tabla, gong
