= Sound Unity =

Live album by William Parker Quartet
- Released: 2005
- Recorded: June 27, 2004 and July 2, 2004
- Venue: Suoni Per Il Popolo, Montreal and the Vancouver International Jazz Festival
- Genre: Jazz
- Length: 72:30
- Label: AUM Fidelity; AUM 022
- Producer: William Parker

William Parker chronology
Requiem (2004)	Sound Unity (2005)	For Percy Heath (2005)

Sound Unity is a live album by American jazz double bassist William Parker, which was recorded in 2004 and originally released on the AUM Fidelity label.

== Reception ==
Professional ratings
Review scores
Source	Rating
AllMusic	4.5/5 stars
The Penguin Guide to Jazz	3.5/4 stars

In his review for AllMusic, Thom Jurek states "Sound Unity is the most beautifully wrought of William Parker's ensemble recordings ... This is a stellar offering from one of the music's greatest lights." The Penguin Guide to Jazz observed ""Hawaii" and the title track are both exceptional lines dealt with at length and "Poem for June Jordan" , dedicated to the black feminist writer, is an intense statement".

The All About Jazz review noted "Each tune in this generous (70-minute) set has its own dedication and story, elaborated in the liner notes along with a few other words from the composer. Each is sufficiently different that you'll run into plenty of surprises along the way. But once you've heard the record out, what's most striking is its overall connectedness". The JazzTimes review by Nate Chinen commented "The new disc, recorded live in Canada during a summer tour last year, advances Parker's claim to a post-bop experimentalism that swings"

== Track listing ==
All compositions by William Parker

1. "Hawaii" - 12:32
2. "Wood Flute Song" - 10:43
3. "Poem for June Jordan" - 8:53
4. " Sound Unity" - 21:02
5. "Harlem" - 8:48
6. " Groove" - 8:19

Tracks 1, 2, 5, 6 recorded at Vancouver East Cultural Centre on Friday, July 2, 2004 . [Vancouver International Festival] Tracks 3, 4 recorded at La Sala Rossa on Sunday, June 27, 2004. [Suoni Per Il Popolo (Montreal)]

== Personnel ==
- William Parker - bass
- Lewis Barnes - trumpet
- Rob Brown - alto saxophone
- Hamid Drake - drums
