= Essence of Ellington =

Live album by William Parker Orchestra
- Released: September 11, 2012
- Recorded: February 5, 2012, at the Teatro Manzoni in Milano, Italy
- Genre: Jazz
- Length: 132:39
- Label: Centering; CENT1008/9
- Producer: William Parker

William Parker chronology
The Gowanus Session (2012)	Essence of Ellington (2012)	Wood Flute Songs (2012)

Essence of Ellington (subtitled Live in Milano) is a double live album by bassist and composer William Parker's Orchestra, which was recorded in Italy in 2012 and released on the Centering label. The album features new arrangements of songs written by or associated with Duke Ellington in addition to new songs by Parker.

== Reception ==
Professional ratings
Review scores
Source	Rating
AllMusic	4/5 stars

AllMusic awarded the album 4 stars. The All About Jazz review noted "Parker has delivered a unique take on the Ellington repertoire which pulls off the trick of being both stridently modern and affectionately reverent". JazzTimes noted "You know that an orchestra organized by William Parker to pay tribute to Duke Ellington is going to result in something sprawling and stupendous, and Essence of Ellington doesn’t disappoint".

== Track listing ==
All compositions by William Parker except as indicated

Disc One:

1. Introduction by William Parker – 3:12
2. "Portrait of Louisiana" – 20:15
3. "Essence of Sophisticated Lady / Sophisticated Lady" (Parker / Duke Ellington) – 26:38
4. "Take the Coltrane" (Ellington) – 21:09

Disc Two:

1. "In a Sentimental Mood" (Ellington) – 7:28
2. "Take the "A" Train / Ebony Interlude" (Billy Strayhorn / Parker) – 16:35
3. "Caravan" (Juan Tizol) – 23:16
4. "The Essence of Ellington" – 14:13

== Personnel ==
- William Parker – bass
- Kidd Jordan – tenor saxophone
- Ras Moshe – tenor saxophone, soprano saxophone
- Rob Brown, Darius Jones – alto saxophone
- Sabir Mateen – tenor saxophone, clarinet
- Dave Sewelson – baritone saxophone
- Roy Campbell Jr.- trumpet, flugelhorn
- Matt Lavelle – trumpet
- Steve Swell, Willie Applewhite – trombone
- Dave Burrell – piano
- Hamid Drake – drums
- Ernie Odoom – vocals
