= I Plan to Stay a Believer =

Live album by William Parker
- Released: September 3, 2010
- Recorded: March 13, 2001, April 3, 2002, February 10, 2007, June 15 and October 25 & 29, 2008
- Genre: Jazz
- Length: 139:50
- Labels: AUM Fidelity; AUM 062/63
- Producer: William Parker

William Parker chronology
At Somewhere There (2008)	I Plan to Stay a Believer (2010)	Winter Sun Crying (2009)

I Plan to Stay a Believer (subtitled The Inside Songs of Curtis Mayfield) is a double live album by American jazz bassist William Parker, recorded between 2001 and 2008 and released on the AUM Fidelity label.

== Reception ==
Professional ratings
Review scores
Source	Rating
AllMusic	4.5/5 stars
Pitchfork Media	8.2/10

In his review for AllMusic, arwulf arwulf states "Any and all recordings made by William Parker and his troupe in honor of Curtis Mayfield really should be obtained and played at high volume for all to hear. This is music of global relevance and cosmic importance. It is also distinctly approachable and, one might even say, embraceable". Pitchfork stated "I have no idea what Mayfield would think of these versions of his songs, but it's hard to imagine him being anything but flattered by the immense thought and planning that clearly went into these arrangements. To pull and stretch these songs so much and still preserve their essential identity is a true feat of art". The All About Jazz review noted "On the surface of it there might not seem to be much continuity between the music of William Parker's and Curtis Mayfield, but scratch away at it and the overlap is revealed. On a social level both men were/are activists, conscious of rights human as well as merely social and, on the basis of the evidence caught in this double live set, both men were/are capable of galvanizing bands to a level of spontaneous joy that's uplifting as well as heartfelt".

== Track listing ==
All compositions are by Curtis Mayfield except as indicated.

Disc One:

1. "I Plan to Stay a Believer" – 12.52
2. "If There's a Hell Below" – 21.23
3. "We the People Who Are Darker Than Blue" – 17.41
4. "I'm So Proud / Ya He Yey Ya" (Curtis Mayfield / William Parker) – 15.15
5. "This Is My Country (Paris)" – 5.44

Disc Two:

1. "People Get Ready/The Inside Song" (Curtis Mayfield / William Parker) – 14.38
2. "This Is My Country (New York)" – 10.56
3. "It's Alright" – 5.13
4. "Move On Up" – 17.27
5. "Freddie's Dead" – 11.26
6. "New World Order" – 6.59
- Disc One, track 5 and Disc Two, track 6 recorded at the Banlieues Bleues Festival, Paris, France on March 13, 2001
- Disc One, track 4 recorded at The Magic Triangle Jazz Concert Series, Buckley Recital Hall, Amherst College, Amherst, MA on April 3, 2002
- Disc One, tracks 1 & 2 recorded at 10th Festival di Cultura e Musica Jazz di Chiasso, Spazio Officina, Chiasso, Switzerland on February 10, 2007
- Disc Two, tracks 1, 2 & 5 recorded at Vision Festival, Main Stage, Clemente Soto Véalez, New York City on June 15, 2008
- Disc One, track 3 and Disc Two, track 3 recorded at the Jazz & Wine of Peace Festival, Cormons, Italy on October 25, 2008
- Disc Two, track 4 recorded at the Teatro Centro Lucia, Botticino Jazz, Botticino, Italy on October 29, 2008

== Personnel ==
- William Parker – bass, doussn'gouni, balofon
- Lewis Barnes – trumpet
- Darryl Foster – tenor saxophone, soprano saxophone
- Sabir Mateen – alto saxophone, tenor saxophone, flute
- Dave Burrell – piano
- Hamid Drake – drums
- Leena Conquest – vocals
- Amiri Baraka – voice, poetry
- Lafayette Gilchrist – piano (Disc One, tracks 1 & 2)
- Guillermo E. Brown – drums (Disc One, tracks 1 & 2)
- New Life Tabernacle Generation of Praise Choir of Brooklyn, NY (Disc Two, tracks 1 & 2)
