= Toshinori Kondo =

Japanese jazz trumpeter (1948–2020)

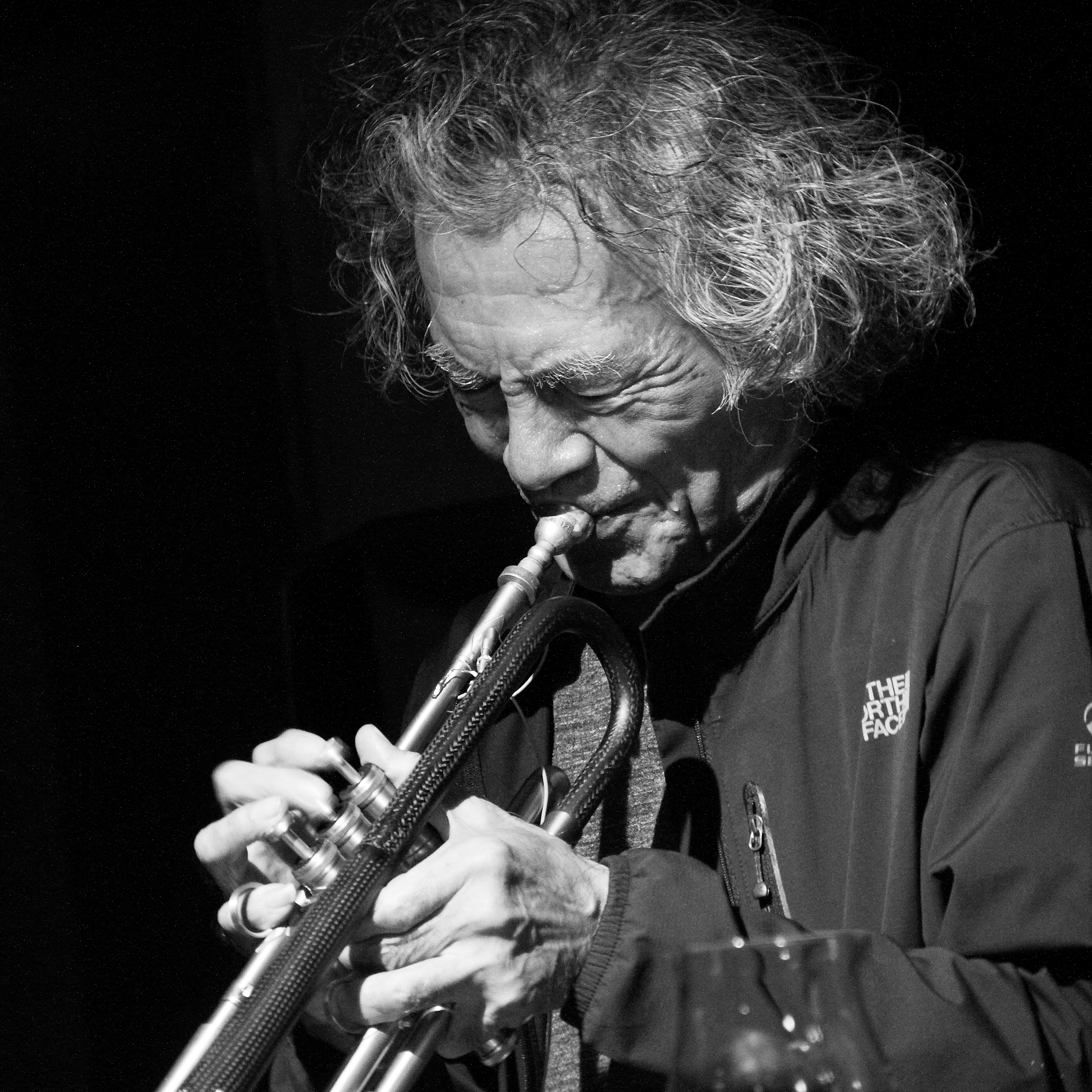
- In concert at Club W71, Weikersheim, 2017

Background information
- Born: December 15, 1948; Ehime Prefecture, Japan
- Died: October 17, 2020 (aged 71) Kawasaki, Kanagawa, Japan
- Genres: Jazz, jazz fusion, avant-garde jazz
- Occupations: Trumpeter, composer
- Instrument: Trumpet

Toshinori Kondo (近藤 等則, Kondō Toshinori; 15 December 1948 – 17 October 2020) was a Japanese trumpeter known for working avant-garde jazz and jazz fusion.

== Career ==
Kondo was born in Ehime Prefecture. He attended Kyoto university in 1967, and became close friends with percussionist Tsuchitori Toshiyuki. In 1972 the pair left university, and Toshiyuki went on to work with Peter Brook, while Kondo joined Yosuke Yamashita. In 1978 he moved to New York, and began performing with Bill Laswell, John Zorn, Fred Frith, and Eraldo Bernocchi. A year later he released his first recording, toured Europe with Eugene Chadbourne, and collaborated with European musicians such as Peter Brötzmann. Returning to Japan, he worked with Ryuichi Sakamoto, Kazumi Watanabe, and Herbie Hancock. In the mid-1980s he began focusing on his own career, blending his avant-garde origins with electronic music. In the 1990s he was part of the collective called Die Like a Dog whose first album Fragments Of Music, Life And Death of Albert Ayler was released in 1994. In 2002, he worked on an international peace festival in Hiroshima after being approached by the Dalai Lama about organizing one. He was a former member of Praxis. Kondo cooperated with Bill Laswell to make the album Inamorata in 2007.

He founded the band Kondo IMA in 1984. Kondo IMA achieved commercial success but moved to Amsterdam to be alone and to start "Blow the Earth" in 1993. They started "Blow the Earth in Japan" in the summer of 2007 and ended in the autumn of 2011. The film Blow the Earth in Japan is his first experience as a film director.

== Personal life ==
On October 17, 2020, he died in Kawasaki City, aged 71.

== Discography ==
=== As leader or co-leader ===
- Environment for Sextet (Ictus, 1979) with John Zorn, Andrea Centazzo, Eugene Chadbourne, Tom Cora, and Polly Bradfield
- Fuigo From a Different Dimension (Bellows, 1979)
- Moose and Salmon (Music Gallery, 1979) with Henry Kaiser and John Oswald
- Possibilities of the Color Plastic (Bellows, 1979) with Eugene Chadbourne
- Protocol (Metalanguage, 1979) with Henry Kaiser and Andrea Centazzo
- Artless Sky (Caw, 1980) with John Russell and Roger Turner
- The Last Supper (Po Torch, 1981) with Paul Lovens
- Imitation of Life (Y, 1981) with Tristan Honsinger, Steve Beresford, and David Toop
- Death is Our Eternal Friend (DIW, 1983) with Paul Lovens and Paul Lytton
- What Are You Talking About? (DIW, 1983) with Tristan Honsinger, Peter Kowald, and Sabu Toyozumi
- China Boogie (Polydor, 1985)
- Kamikaze Blow (Alfa, 1989) with IMA
- Ki-Oku (Sony, 1996) with DJ Krush
- Fear No Fall (Lowlands, 1998) with Jim O'Rourke, Zeena Parkins, David Shea, DJ Low, and Dirk Wachtelaer
- Aida's Call (Starlight, 1999) with Kaoru Abe, Motoharu Yoshizawa, and Derek Bailey
- Charged (Apollo, 1999) with Eraldo Bernocchi and Bill Laswell
- Jazz Bunker (Golden Years, 2000) with Han Bennink and Eugene Chadbourne
- Life Space Death (Meta, 2001) with Bill Laswell
- The Warriors (Ictus, 2007) with Eugene Chadbourne and Andrea Centazzo
- The War Fairy Tales (self-released, 2014)
- Interstellar (Chant Records, 2020) with Jason Wayne Sneed
- Typhoon 19 (TK, 2020) with IMA21
- The Sea is Rough (Bocian, 2020) with Brom
- Renzoku Jump (Metalanguage, 2022) with Henry Kaiser, Greg Goodman and John Oswald
- Eternal Triangle (I Dischi Di Angelica, 2022) with Massimo Pupillo and Tony Buck

With the Die Like a Dog Quartet (Kondo, Peter Brötzmann, William Parker, and Hamid Drake)

- Die Like a Dog: Fragments of Music, Life and Death of Albert Ayler (FMP, 1994)
- Little Birds Have Fast Hearts Nos. 1 and 2 (FMP, 1998/1999)
- Aoyama Crows (FMP, 2002)
- The Complete FMP Recordings (Jazzwerkstatt, 2007) compilation
- Close Up (FMP, 2011)

With Hairy Bones (Kondo, Peter Brötzmann, Massimo Pupillo, and Paal Nilssen-Love)

- Hairy Bones (Okka, 2009)
- At Fresnes (self-released, 2010)
- Snakelust (To Kenji Nakagami) (Clean Feed, 2012)

=== As sideman ===
With Maki Asakawa

- Hi Tomoshi Goro (Express, 1976)
- Cat Nap (Express, 1982)
- Scandal 1982 (Pignose, 2011)

With Borbetomagus

- Industrial Strength (Leo, 1983)
- Borbeto Jam, (Cadence, 1985)

With Peter Brötzmann

- Alarm (FMP, 1983)
- Berlin Djungle (FMP, 1987)
- The März Combo Live in Wuppertal (FMP, 1993)
- Stone/Water (Okka, 2000)
- Long Story Short (Trost, 2013)
- Concert for Fukushima, Wels 2011 (Trost, 2013)
- Tonic 2000 Vol. 1 (OMX, 2020)
- Tonic 2000 Vol. 2 (OMX, 2020)
- Berlin 1999 (OMX, 2020)

With DJ Krush

- Holonic-The Self Megamix (Sony, 1997)
- Cosmic Yard (Es.U.Es, 2018)

With Globe Unity Orchestra

- Intergalactic Blow (Japo, 1983)
- 20th Anniversary (FMP, 1993)

With Tristan Honsinger

- Picnic (Data, 1985)
- From the Broken World (Eastworld, 1992)

With Bill Laswell

- Points of Order (Innerhythmic, 2001)
- The Only Way to Go Is Down (Sublight, 2006) with Method of Defiance
- Inamorata (Ohm, 2007) with Method of Defiance
- Tokyo Rotation K2: Japan Rise (self-released, 2020)
- Tokyo Rotation 4 - Day 3 (self-released, 2021)
- Tokyo Rotation 1 - Day 2 Set 1 (self-released, 2021)
- Tokyo Rotation 1 - Day 2 Set 2 (self-released, 2021)
- Tokyo Rotation 3 - Day 3 Set 1 (self-released, 2021)
- Tokyo Rotation 3 - Day 3 Set 2 (self-released, 2021)
- Montreux Jazz Festival (self-released, 2022)
- Sapporo (self-released, 2022)

With others

- Evolution Ensemble Unity, Concrete Voices (EEU, 1976)
- Jam Rice Sextet, Jam Rice Relaxin' (Frasco, 1976)
- Yosuke Yamashita and Yasutaka Tsutsui, Ie (Frasco, 1976)
- Milford Graves, Meditation Among Us (Kitty, 1977)
- King Kong Paradise, Talking About Fussa (Tam, 1977)
- Derek Bailey, Duo & Trio Improvisation (Kitty, 1978)
- Peter Kuhn, Livin' Right (Big City, 1979)
- Eugene Chadbourne, 2000 Statues and the English Channel (Parachute, 1979)
- William Parker, Through Acceptance of the Mystery Peace (Centering, 1980)
- Misha Mengelberg and the ICP Orchestra, Japan Japon (ICP, 1982)
- Herbie Hancock, Sound-System (Columbia, 1984)
- Ryuichi Sakamoto, Ongaku Zukan (Midi, 1984)
- Autonomous Zone, The Map is Not the Territory (Meldac, 1991)
- David Toop, Spirit World (Virgin, 1997)
- Ferretti Lindo Giovanni, CO.DEX (Mercury, 2000)
- Anarchy, Freaksnegoti (Gold Diggers, 2000)
- Peter Kowald, Duos²: Europa America Japan (FMP, 1991)
- Robert Miles, Miles_Gurtu (Salt, 2004)
- Dirk Wachtelaer, Reconstruction (FMR, 2005)
- Somma, Somma (Verba Corrige, 2007)
- Sigillum S, 23/20 (Verba Corrige, 2007)
- Levity, Chopin Shuffle (Universal, 2010)
- Sugizo, Tree of Life (Avex Trax, 2011)
- Jon Batiste, Chad Smith, and Bill Laswell, The Process (MOD, 2014)
- Rone, Creatures (Infiné, 2014)
- Dashmesh, The Peacock's Tale (Invincible, 2016)
- Arthur Williams, Forgiveness Suite (NoBusiness, 2016)
- Company, 1981 (Honest Jon's, 2019)
- Fred Anderson, Live Volume V (FPE, 2019)
