= For Percy Heath =

Live album by William Parker & the Little Huey Creative Music Orchestra
- Released: 2006
- Recorded: May 22, 2005; Victoriaville, Canada
- Genre: Jazz
- Length: 61:45
- Label: Les Disques Victo; Victo CD 102
- Producer: Joanne Vézina and Michel Levasseur

William Parker chronology
Sound Unity (2004)	For Percy Heath (2006)	Summer Snow (2005)

For Percy Heath is an album by bassist and composer William Parker's Little Huey Creative Music Orchestra, which was recorded in 2005 and released on the Canadian Victo label. The album is a suite of compositions inspired by and dedicated to bassist Percy Heath, who died in 2005.

== Reception ==
Professional ratings
Review scores
Source	Rating
AllMusic	4.5/5 stars
The Penguin Guide to Jazz Recordings	4/4 stars

AllMusic awarded the album 4½ stars stating "Sounding in part like Coltrane's Ascension or Cherry's Symphony for Improvisers, Parker's For Percy Heath is a four-part suite actuated by the Little Huey Creative Music Orchestra, here consisting of three trumpeters, three trombonists, three reed players, tuba, drums, and bass".

== Track listing ==
All compositions by William Parker

1. "For Percy Heath: Part One" - 10:34
2. "For Percy Heath: Part Two" - 9:49
3. "For Percy Heath: Part Three" - 10:15
4. "For Percy Heath: Part Four" - 17:40

== Personnel ==
- William Parker - bass
- Roy Campbell Jr., Lewis Barnes, Matt Lavelle - trumpet
- Masahiko Kono, Alex Lodico, Steve Swell - trombone
- Dave Hofstra - tuba
- Sabir Mateen - tenor saxophone
- Rob Brown - alto saxophone
- Charles Waters - alto saxophone, clarinet
- Ori Kaplan - alto saxophone
- Darryl Foster - tenor saxophone, soprano saxophone
- Dave Sewelson - baritone saxophone
- Andrew Barker - drums
