= O'Neal's Porch =

Studio album by William Parker
- Released: 2001
- Recorded: May 26, 2000; Seltzer Sound, New York City
- Genre: Jazz
- Length: 72:30
- Label: AUM Fidelity; AUM 022
- Producer: William Parker

William Parker chronology
Piercing the Veil (2000)	O'Neal's Porch (2001)	Bob's Pink Cadillac (2001)

O'Neal's Porch is an album by American jazz double bassist William Parker, which was recorded in 2000 and originally released in a limited edition on the on Centering label and given a wider release on the AUM Fidelity label.

== Reception ==
Professional ratings
Review scores
Source	Rating
AllMusic	4/5 stars
The Penguin Guide to Jazz	4/4 stars

In his review for AllMusic, Sam Samuelson states "this collection also demonstrates that jazz can be propelled within its traditions as a stepping stone and not necessarily as a model to copy. O'Neal's Porch and Parker's brand of inside/outside compositions mark territory that proves the so-called avant is not that philosophically far away from the modern mainstream revivalists." The Penguin Guide to Jazz observed "Parker has been bolder and will write more ambitious music, but he will find it more challenging to top this one for sheer listenability and intrigue".

The All About Jazz review noted "Much of the intrigue about O'Neal's Porch derives from the ambiguous structure of the music. You never really know where it's headed: whether in or out, whether back to the theme or out into space. Even when the tunes have a familiar swinging, funky, or melancholic feel, Parker's quartet offers plenty of surprises". The JazzTimes review by Aaron Steinberg commented "On O'Neal's Porch, a debut recording with his new quartet, the bassist is a rock, a steady locus of sound and rhythm aware of his sonic context but absolutely sure of his own gestures"

== Track listing ==
All compositions by William Parker

1. "Purple" - 9:56
2. "Sun" - 13:56
3. "O'Neal's Porch" - 13:42
4. "Rise" - 9:39
5. "Song for Jesus" - 9:01
6. "Leaf" - 4:50
7. "Song for Jesus ¾" - 6:18
8. "Moon" - 5:12

== Personnel ==
- William Parker - bass
- Lewis Barnes - trumpet
- Rob Brown - alto saxophone
- Hamid Drake - drums
