= Die Like a Dog (album) =

Die Like a Dog: Fragments of Music, Life and Death of Albert Ayler

Live album by Peter Brötzmann, Toshinori Kondo, William Parker, and Hamid Drake
- Released: 1994
- Recorded: August 19, 1993
- Venue: Townhall Charlottenburg, Berlin
- Genre: Free jazz
- Label: FMP; CD 64
- Producer: Jost Gebers, Peter Brötzmann

Die Like a Dog: Fragments of Music, Life and Death of Albert Ayler is a live album by saxophonist Peter Brötzmann, trumpeter Toshinori Kondo, bassist William Parker, and drummer Hamid Drake. It was recorded in August 1993 at Townhall Charlottenburg in Berlin, and was released in 1994 by FMP. The group, which would go on to tour and make multiple recordings, became known as the Die Like a Dog Quartet.

The album pays tribute to saxophonist Albert Ayler, and some of the tracks feature short quotations from his music. Brötzmann reflected: "The idea of expressing my love of and admiration for Albert Ayler - both man and music - in a musical statement is not new. We both tried to do similar or almost identical things at the same point in time, each independently and without knowing anything about each other - each of us within his own culture."

In 2007, the album was reissued as part of the compilation Die Like a Dog Quartet: The Complete FMP Recordings.

== Reception ==
Professional ratings
Review scores
Source	Rating
AllMusic	4/5 stars
The Penguin Guide to Jazz	3.5/4 stars
Tom Hull – on the Web	B

In a review for AllMusic, Joslyn Lane wrote: "here... you get four musicians who, whenever they're playing, play with every ounce of their attention, passion, and ability. Add to this each musician's great ability on his respective instrument and you get music that is alternately moving, invigorating, and astonishing."

The authors of the Penguin Guide to Jazz Recordings awarded the album 3½ stars, calling it "a stark, harrowing meditation on the life and work of Albert Ayler." They commented: "it's fuming and intractable stuff, but its spiritual measure is palpable and the quartet plays with stunning commitment."

Critic Tom Hull described the album as "impressive, exhaustive work," and stated that "the ghost of Albert Ayler looms large." He remarked that, in comparison with Ayler's music, Die Like a Dog is "more mediated, so while it easily attains the intended levels of intensity and difficulty, its reconstructed Ayler is more knowing and expert."

Writing for All About Jazz, Clifford Allen commented: "Die Like a Dog shows the quartet rightly as a working and cooperative band, one with a shared European, American and Japanese heritage and a sensibility that crosses numerous creative isles with a few fell swoops."

Author Todd S. Jenkins called the album "an apt tribute to the free-jazz great who died like a dog in the East River," noting that it "acknowledges Ayler's music directly and in spirit."

== Track listing ==
1. "No. 1" (Brötzmann) – 21:47
2. "No. 2A: Saint James Infirmary" (Don Redman) – 4:07
3. "No. 2B: Untitled" (Brötzmann) – 10:37
4. "No. 2C: Saint James Infirmary" (Don Redman) – 1:15
5. "No. 3A: Two Birds in a Feather" (Brötzmann) – 1:23
6. "No. 3B: Untitled" (Brötzmann) – 17:28
7. "No. 4" (Brötzmann) – 16:05

== Personnel ==
- Peter Brötzmann – tenor saxophone, alto saxophone, tárogató
- Toshinori Kondo – trumpet, electronics
- William Parker – double bass
- Hamid Drake – drums, frame drum
