= Piercing the Veil =

Studio album by William Parker & Hamid Drake
- Released: June 5, 2001
- Recorded: April 3, 2000; Systems Two Studio, Brooklyn, NY
- Genre: Jazz
- Label: AUM Fidelity; AUM 017 (Reissue AUM 039/40)
- Producer: William Parker

William Parker chronology
Painter's Spring (2000)	Piercing the Veil (2001)	O'Neal's Porch (2001)

Piercing the Veil is an album by bassist William Parker and drummer Hamid Drake, which was recorded in 2000 and originally released on the AUM Fidelity label. The album was later reissued in 2007 as a 2-CD set adding the live recording First Communion.

== Reception ==
Professional ratings
Review scores
Source	Rating
AllMusic	4/5 stars
PopMatters	8/10 stars
The Penguin Guide to Jazz Recordings	3/4 stars

In his review for AllMusic, Tom Schulte said the album featured "stunning, unexpected twists of Byzantine rhythms one would expect from such a free thinking rhythm section without other instruments". The All About Jazz review noted "Piercing the Veil excels because it embraces what should be conventional and tired. It is "world music" made wondrous".

The All About Jazz review of expanded edition noted "First Communion is a spontaneously creative and intimate epic. Parker and Drake may call the contrabass and trap drums their primary instruments, but 2001's Piercing the Veil offered the full range of the duo's musical vocabulary, including a showcase for Parker's affection for exotic double-reeds". PopMatters stated "Among the finest and most accessible recordings made by “free players” in recent years is Piercing the Veil by the duo of bassist William Parker and drummer Hamid Drake. You can tell it’s a bunch of kooky-crazy out-jazz because—“What?! Just drums and acoustic bass and no ‘real’ instruments!?” And then you listen and what you hear is: swing, groove, excitement, melody, and beauty. And you thought you didn’t like “free jazz”. Piercing the Veil has now been reissued along with a live concert recorded the previous day, First Communion—a glorious release that reminds fans how good the original 1999 disc was".

== Track listing ==
All compositions by William Parker and Hamid Drake

1. "Black Cherry" - 2:42
2. "Chatima" - 6:17
3. "Heavenly Walk" - 3:44
4. "Japeru" - 4:41
5. "Nur Al Anwar" - 3:55
6. "Piercing the Veil" - 2:50
7. "Loom Song" - 6:35
8. "Chaung Tzu's Dream" - 8:55
9. "Bodies Die/Spirits Live" - 4:26

Bonus CD with 2007 Reissue: First Communion

1. "First Communion I" - 20:32
2. "First Communion II" - 13:51
3. "First Communion III" - 53:57
- Recorded at AUM HQ in Brooklyn, NY on April 1, 2000

== Personnel ==
- William Parker - bass, balafon, slit drum, dumbek, shakuhachi
- Hamid Drake - drums, bells, tabla, percussion
