= Hamid Drake =

American jazz drummer and percussionist (born 1955)

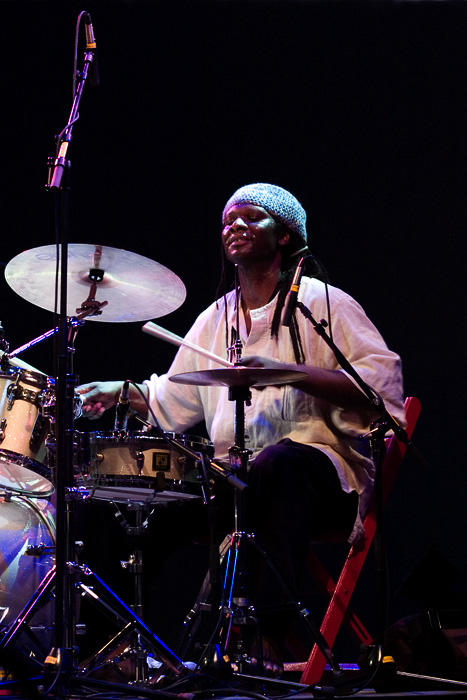
- Drake at Moers Festival 2006, Germany

Background information
- Born: Henry Lawrence Drake; August 3, 1955 (age 71); Monroe, Louisiana, U.S.
- Genre: Jazz
- Occupation: Musician
- Instruments: Drums, tabla, conga
- Years active: 1970–present

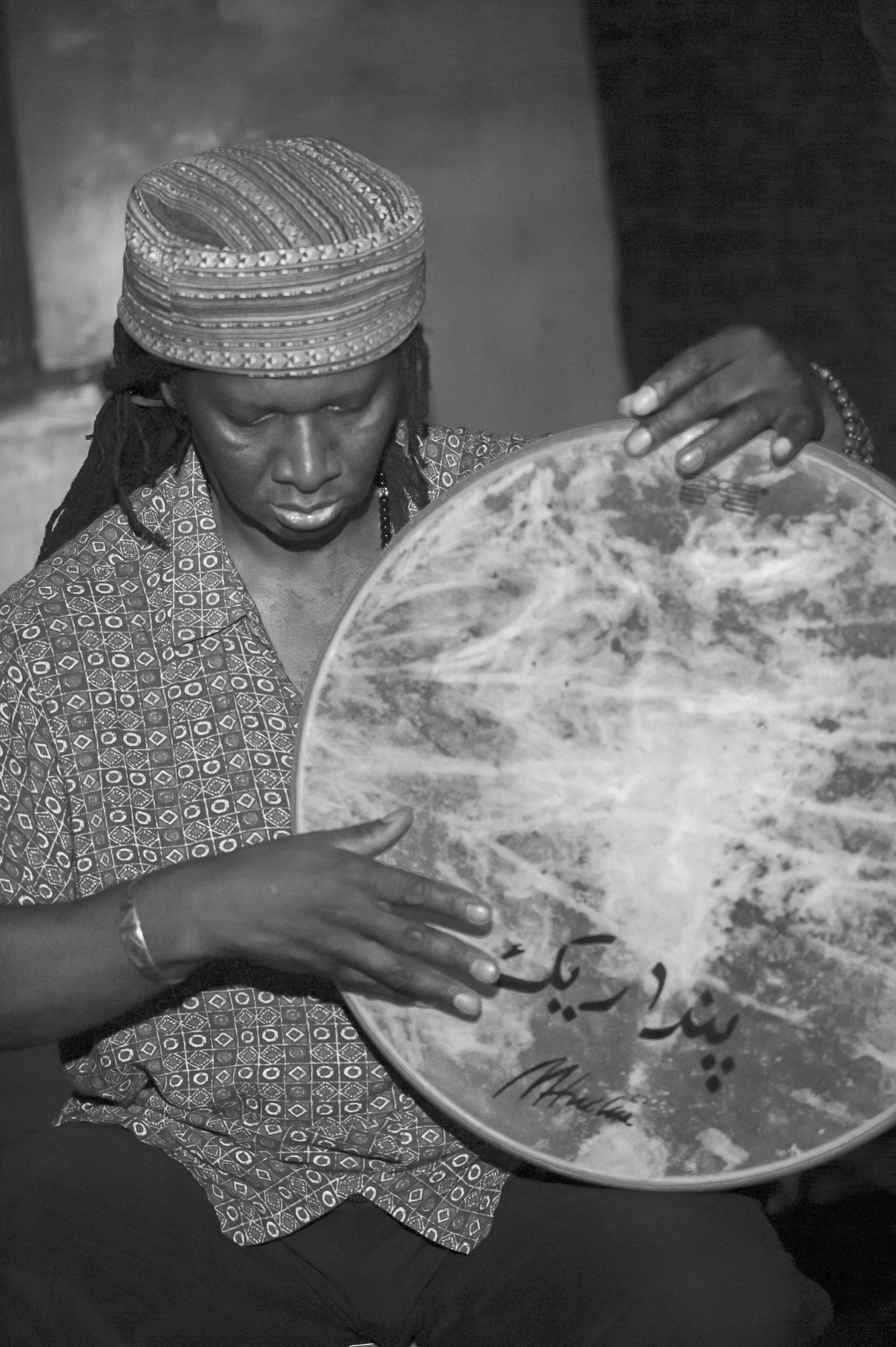
Hamid Drake, Vision Festival XIII. Photo by Marek Lazarski

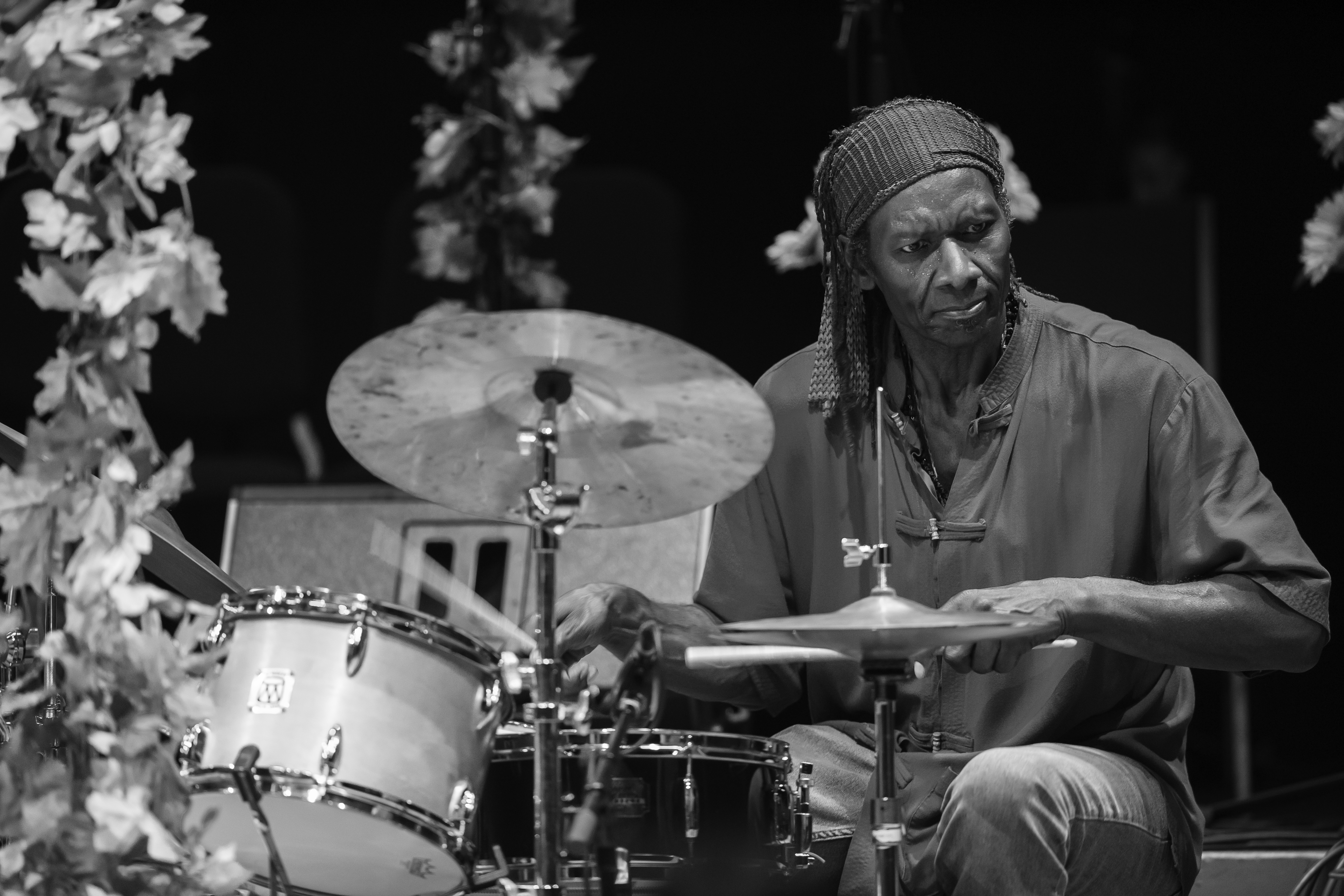
Hamid Drake, Arts for Art - Vision Festival 2024. Photo by Marek Lazarski

Hamid Drake (born August 3, 1955) is an American jazz drummer and percussionist.

By the close of the 1990s, Hamid Drake was widely regarded as one of the best percussionists in jazz and improvised music. Incorporating Afro-Cuban, Indian, and African percussion instruments and influence, in addition to using the standard trap set, Drake has collaborated extensively with top free jazz improvisers. Drake also has performed world music; by the late 1970s, he was a member of Foday Musa Suso's Mandingo Griot Society and has played reggae throughout his career.

Drake has worked with trumpeter Don Cherry, pianist Herbie Hancock, saxophonists Pharoah Sanders, Fred Anderson, Archie Shepp and David Murray, and bassists Reggie Workman and William Parker (in many lineups).

Drake studied drums extensively, including eastern and Caribbean styles. He frequently plays without sticks, using his hands to develop subtle commanding undertones. His tabla playing is notable for his subtlety and flair. Drake's questing nature and his interest in Caribbean percussion led to a deep involvement with reggae.

== Early life ==
Hamid Drake (birth name Henry Lawrence Drake) was born in 1955 in Monroe, Louisiana, and when he was a child, he moved to Evanston, Illinois to live with relatives. There, he started playing with local rock and R&B bands, which eventually brought him to the attention of Fred Anderson, an older saxophonist who had also moved to Evanston from Monroe as a child decades earlier. Drake worked with Anderson from 1974 to 2010, including on Anderson's 1979 The Missing Link. At Anderson's workshops, a young Hamid met Douglas Ewart, George E. Lewis and other members of Chicago's Association for the Advancement of Creative Musicians (AACM). Another of the most significant percussion influences on Drake, Ed Blackwell, dates from this period. Drake's flowing rhythmic expressions and interest in the roots of the music drew like-minded musicians together into a performance and educational collective named the Mandingo Griot Society, which combined traditional African music and narrative with distinctly American influences.

== Career ==
Don Cherry, who Drake first met in 1978, was another continuing collaborator. After meeting Cherry, Drake and fellow percussionist Adam Rudolph travelled with Don to Europe, where they explored the interior landscape of percussion and shared deeply in Mr. Cherry's grasp of music's spiritually infinite transformational possibilities. Drake worked extensively with him from 1978 until Cherry's death in 1995.

Drake was one of the founders, along with Foday Musa Suso and Adam Rudolph, of The Mandingo Griot Society. His other frequent collaborators include New York bassist William Parker, saxophonist David Murray, composer and percussionist Adam Rudolph, German free jazz saxophonist Peter Brötzmann and drummer Michael Zerang.

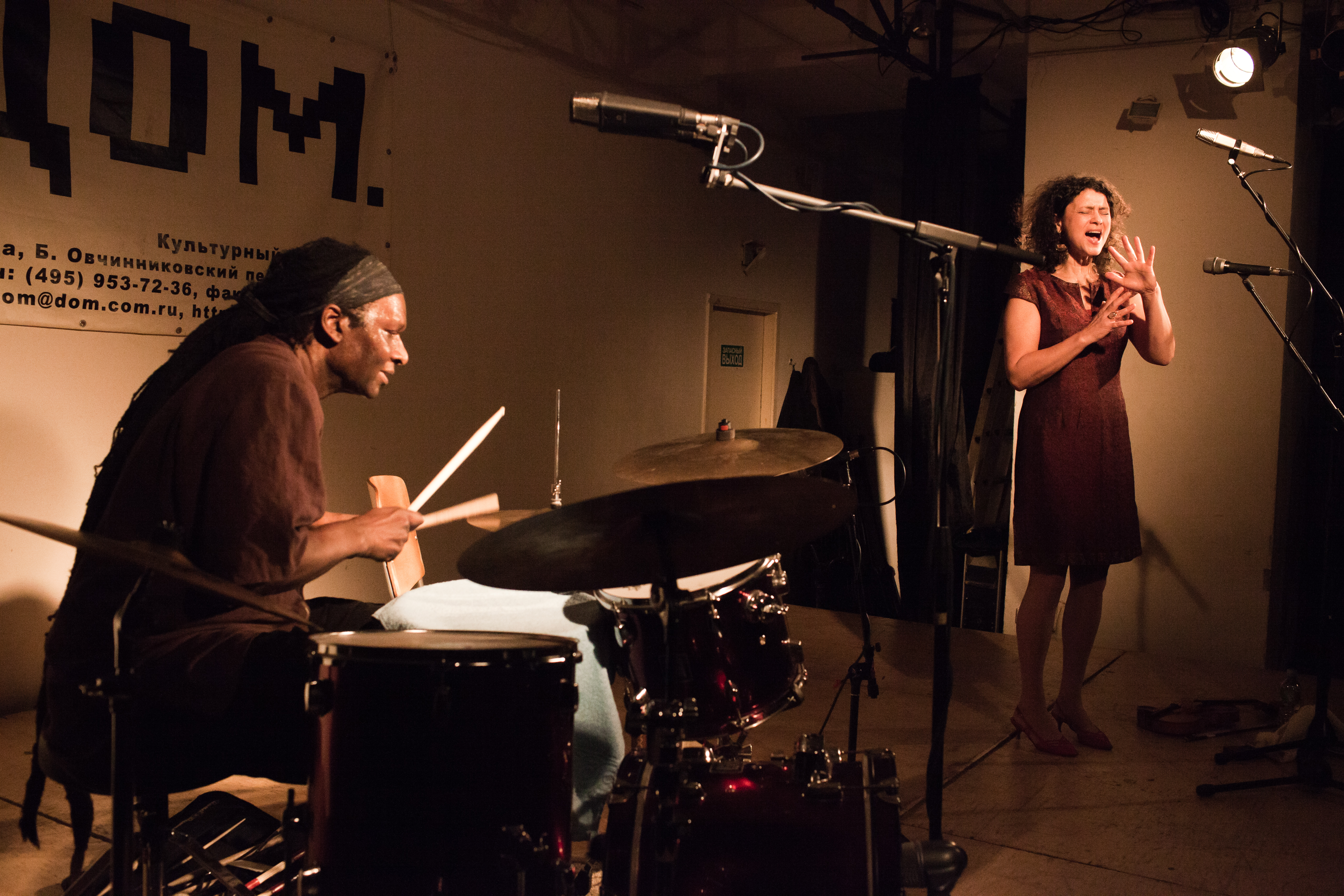
Drake performing with Iva Bittová in Moscow in January 2014

Drake has played and/or recorded with: Don Cherry, Pharoah Sanders, Fred Anderson, Herbie Hancock, Archie Shepp, bassist William Parker (in many lineups), Reggie Workman, Yusef Lateef, Wayne Shorter, Bill Laswell, David Murray, Joe Morris, Evan Parker, Paolo Angeli, Peter Brötzmann, Jim Pepper, Roy Campbell, Matthew Shipp, Sabir Mateen, Rob Brown, Mat Walerian, Marilyn Crispell, Johnny Dyani, Dewey Redman, Joe McPhee, Adam Rudolph, Hassan Hakmoun, Joseph Jarman, George E. Lewis, John Tchicai, Iva Bittová, Ken Vandermark, and almost all of the members of the AACM. These diverse artists all play in a broad range of musical settings which allows Drake to comfortably adapt to north and west African and Indian impulses as well as reggae and Latin. Although engaged as sideman, he has also devoted his energies and creativity as a band leader; focusing on his own groups and projects such as Bindu and Indigo Trio.

Drake has frequently appeared with jazz legend Archie Shepp in various configurations. The most common is the group Phat Jam along with human beat boxer and rapper Napoleon Maddox. Drake also works with Maddox in the jazz hip hop group ISWHAT?!. Drake performs with European jazz groups, recording with Hungarian musicians such as Viktor Tóth and Mihály Dresch. In addition to the drum set, Drake performs on the frame drum, the tabla, and other hand drums.

=== Winter solstice concerts by Drake & Zerang Duo ===
Since 1991, Drake has collaborated with fellow percussionist Michael Zerang to present annual winter solstice concerts. Both musicians have been committed to return to Chicago, from wherever they may be performing, to stage the solstice event which commemorates the northern hemisphere's shortest day. Currently, the duo plays at Constellation, in the Roscoe Village area of Chicago. About the winter event Drake has said,

"The solstice is an important time for all people of any religion or race, because it's about the cycling of the earth itself, and nobody can really claim that. It's a time of the year when a lot of people are home and visiting, and we wanted to create something that people would enjoy at that particular time, regardless of whatever they might be following. I think it just kind of naturally turned into this continuing event. I don't think that we planned it at the beginning."

Occasionally, including in 2020, the Hamid Drake & Michael Zerang Duo have also performed a summer solstice concert in Chicago. The duo has released two albums – Ask the Sun (1996) and For Ed Blackwell (2015, recorded in 1995).

In most years, about a week later Drake performs again in Chicago with the DKV Trio.

== Partial discography ==
=== As leader/coleader ===
- Emancipation Proclamation: A Real Statement of Freedom (Okka Disk, 1999, [2000]) with Joe McPhee
- The All-Star Game (Eremite, 2000, [2003]) with Marshall Allen, Kidd Jordan, William Parker, and Alan Silva
- Hu: Vibrational Universal Mother (Soul Jazz, 2006)
- Live at Okuden (ESP-Disk, 2016)

with Bindu

- Bindu (RogueArt, 2005)
- Blissful (RogueArt, 2008)
- Reggaeology (RogueArt, 2010)

with DKV Trio

- See also: Ken Vandermark discography#DKV Trio

with Indigo Trio

- The Ethiopian Princess Meets the Tantric Priest (RogueArt, 2011)
- Anaya (RogueArt, 2009)
- Live in Montreal (Greenleaf, 2007)

with Mandingo Griot Society

- Mandingo Griot Society
- Mighty Rhythm
- Watto Sitta

with Adam Rudolph

- Contemplations
- 12 Arrows
- Dream Garden

with Pharoah Sanders and Adam Rudolph

- Spirits (Meta, 2000)

with Irène Schweizer

- Celebration (Intakt, 2021)

with Spaceways Inc.

- See also: Ken Vandermark discography#with Spaceways Inc.

with The Turbine! (Harrison Bankhead, Benjamin Duboc, Drake, Ramon Lopez)

- Entropy/Enthalpy (RogueArt, 2015)

Various duos

- Drake/Stewart – Timelines
- Drake/Mateen – Brothers Together
- Drake/McPhee – Emancipation Proclamation
- Drake/Tsahar – Live at Glenn Miller Café
- Drake/Tsahar – Soul Bodies vol. 1
- Drake/Zerang – Ask the Sun (1996, Okka Disk/Pink Palace)
- Drake/Zerang – For Ed Blackwell, recorded 1995 (2015, Pink Palace)

=== As sideman ===
with Joshua Abrams

- Magnetoception (Eremite Records MTE-63/64, 2015)

With Fred Anderson

- Another Place (Moers, 1978)
- Dark Day (Message, 1979); reissue as Dark Day + Live in Verona (Atavastic, 2001)
- The Missing Link (Nessa, 1979, issued 1984)
- The Milwaukee Tapes Vol. 1 (Atavistic, 1980, issued 2000)
- Destiny (Okka Disk, 1995)
- Birdhouse (Okka Disk, 1996)
- Live at the Velvet Lounge (Okka Disk, 1999)
- 2 Days in April (Eremite, 2000)
- Fred Anderson Quartet Volume Two (Asian Improv, 2000)
- On the Run, Live at the Velvet Lounge (Delmark, 2001)
- Back Together Again (Thrill Jockey, 2004)
- Blue Winter (Eremite, 2005)
- Timeless, Live at the Velvet Lounge (Delmark, 2006)
- From the River to the Ocean (Thrill Jockey, 2007)

with Beans

- Only (with William Parker) (2006)

with Albert Beger and William Parker

- Evolving Silence Vol. 1 (Earsay's Jazz, 2005)
- Evolving Silence Vol. 2 (Earsay's Jazz, 2006)

With Black Top (Orphy Robinson and Pat Thomas)

- Some Good News (Otoroku, 2021)

with Peter Brötzmann

- Brötzmann/Drake – The Dried Rat–Dog
- Brötzmann/Drake – Brötzmann/Drake
- Brötzmann/Kessler/Drake – Live at the Empty Bottle
- Brötzmann/Mahmoud Gania/Drake – The Wels Concert
- Brötzmann/Moukhtar Gania/Drake – The Catch of a Ghost
- Brötzmann/Kondo/Parker/Drake – Die Like a Dog: Fragments of Music, Life and Death of Albert Ayler
- Brötzmann/Parker/Drake – Never Too Late But Always Too Early
- Brötzmann Chicago Tentet – Broken English
- Brötzmann Chicago Octet/Tentet – The Chicago Octet/Tentet
- Brötzmann Chicago Tentet – Images
- Brötzmann Chicago Tentet – Short Visit to Nowhere
- Brötzmann Chicago Tentet – Signs
- Brötzmann Chicago Tentet – Stone/Water
- Brötzmann/Die Like a Dog – Aoyama Crows
- Brötzmann/Die Like a Dog – Close Up
- Brötzmann/Die Like a Dog – From Valley to Valley
- Brötzmann/Die Like a Dog – Little Birds Have Fast Hearts No. 1
- Brötzmann/Die Like a Dog – Little Birds Have Fast Hearts No. 2
- Parker/Brötzmann – The Bishop's Move
- Drake/Brötzmann/Hopkins – The Atlanta Concert

with Rob Brown

- The Big Picture (Marge, 2004)

with Roy Campbell

- Ethnic Stew and Brew

with Chicago Trio (Ernest Dawkins, Harrison Bankhead, Drake)

- Velvet Songs (RogueArt, 2011)

with Marilyn Crispell and Peter Brötzmann

- Hyperion (Music & Arts, 1995)

with Scott Fields

- Five Frozen Eggs (Music and Arts/Clean Feed, 1997/2011)
- Dénouement (Geode/Clean Feed, 1999/2011)

with Chico Freeman / George Freeman

- All in the Family (Southport, (2015)

with Herbie Hancock

- Sound-System (Columbia, 1984)
- Jazz Africa (NEC Avenue, 1987)

with IsWhat?!

- You Figure It Out (Hyena, 2004)
- The Life We Chose (Hyena, 2006)

with David Murray

- Gwotet
- Live in Berlin
- Waltz Again

with Natural Information Society

- Mandatory Reality (Eremite, 2019)
- Since Time Is Gravity (Eremite, 2023)

with Painkiller

- 50th Birthday Celebration Volume 12 (2003)

with William Parker

- Painter's Spring (Thirsty Ear, 2000)
- Piercing the Veil (AUM Fidelity, 2001) – reissued in 2007 as Piercing the Veil + First Communion
- O'Neal's Porch (AUM Fidelity, 2000)
- Eloping with the Sun (Riti, 2001) – with Joe Morris and William Danced
- Raining on the Moon (Thirsty Ear, 2002)
- Scrapbook (Thirsty Ear, 2003)
- Sound Unity (AUM Fidelity, 2005)
- Summer Snow (AUM Fidelity, 2005 [2007])
- Corn Meal Dance (AUM Fidelity, 2007)
- Alphaville Suite (RogueArt, 2007)
- I Plan to Stay a Believer (AUM Fidelity, 2010)
- Double Sunrise Over Neptune (AUM Fidelity, 2007)
- Petit Oiseau (AUM Fidelity, 2007)
- Essence of Ellington (Centering, 2012)
- Wood Flute Songs (AUM Fidelity, 2013)
- Organic Grooves [Parker/Drake] – Black Cherry
- Palm of Soul – Jordan/Parker/Drake
- The Last Dances – Drake/Gahnold/Parker
- Heart Trio — Parker/Drake/Cooper-Moore (AUM Fidelity, 2024)

with Hugh Ragin

- Revelation (Justin Time, 2004)

with Pharoah Sanders

- Message from Home (Verve, 1996)

with Irene Schweizer and Fred Anderson

- Willisau & Taktlos (Intakt, 2007)

with Mako Sica

- Ronda (Feeding Tube co-released with Astral Spirits/Instant Classic, (2018)
- Balancing Tear (Feeding Tube co-released with Astral Spirits, 2020)
- Ourania featuring Tatsu Aoki & Thymme Jones (Feeding Tube/Instant Classic, 2021)

with Steve Swell

- Swimming in a Galaxy of Goodwill and Sorrow (RogueArt, 2007)

with Malachi Thompson

- Freebop Now! (Delmark, 1998)

with David S. Ware

- Live in the World (Thirsty Ear, 2005)

with Yakuza

- Transmutations (Prosthetic, 2007)
