= William Parker (musician) =

American jazz musician

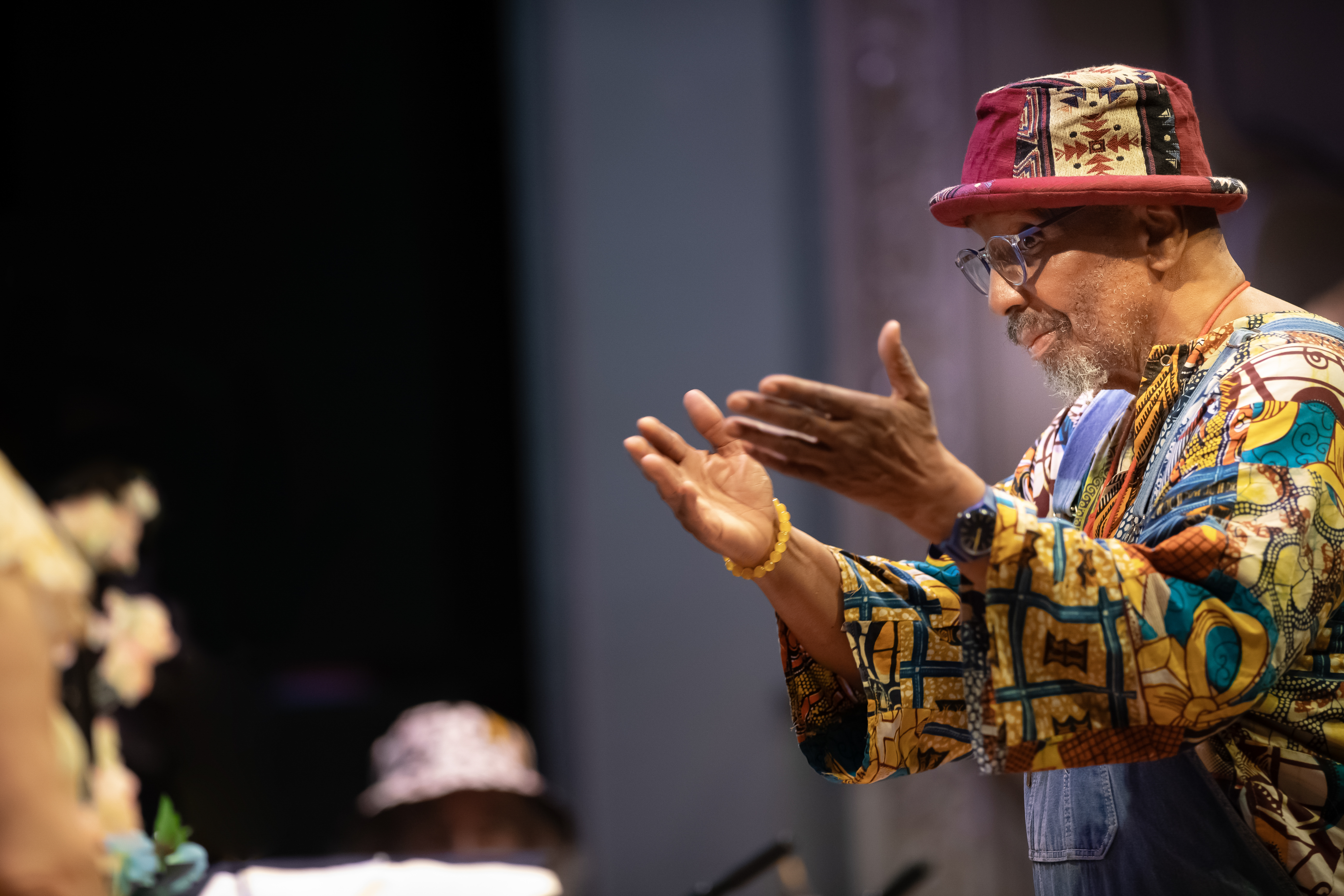
- Parker in 2024

Background information
- Born: January 10, 1952 (age 74); New York City, U.S.
- Genres: Free Jazz
- Occupations: Musician, composer, poet
- Instrument: Double bass
- Years active: 1970s–present
- Labels: Centering, 577 Records, AUM Fidelity, Intakt, Tzadik, Thirsty Ear, RogueArt
- Website: williamparker.net

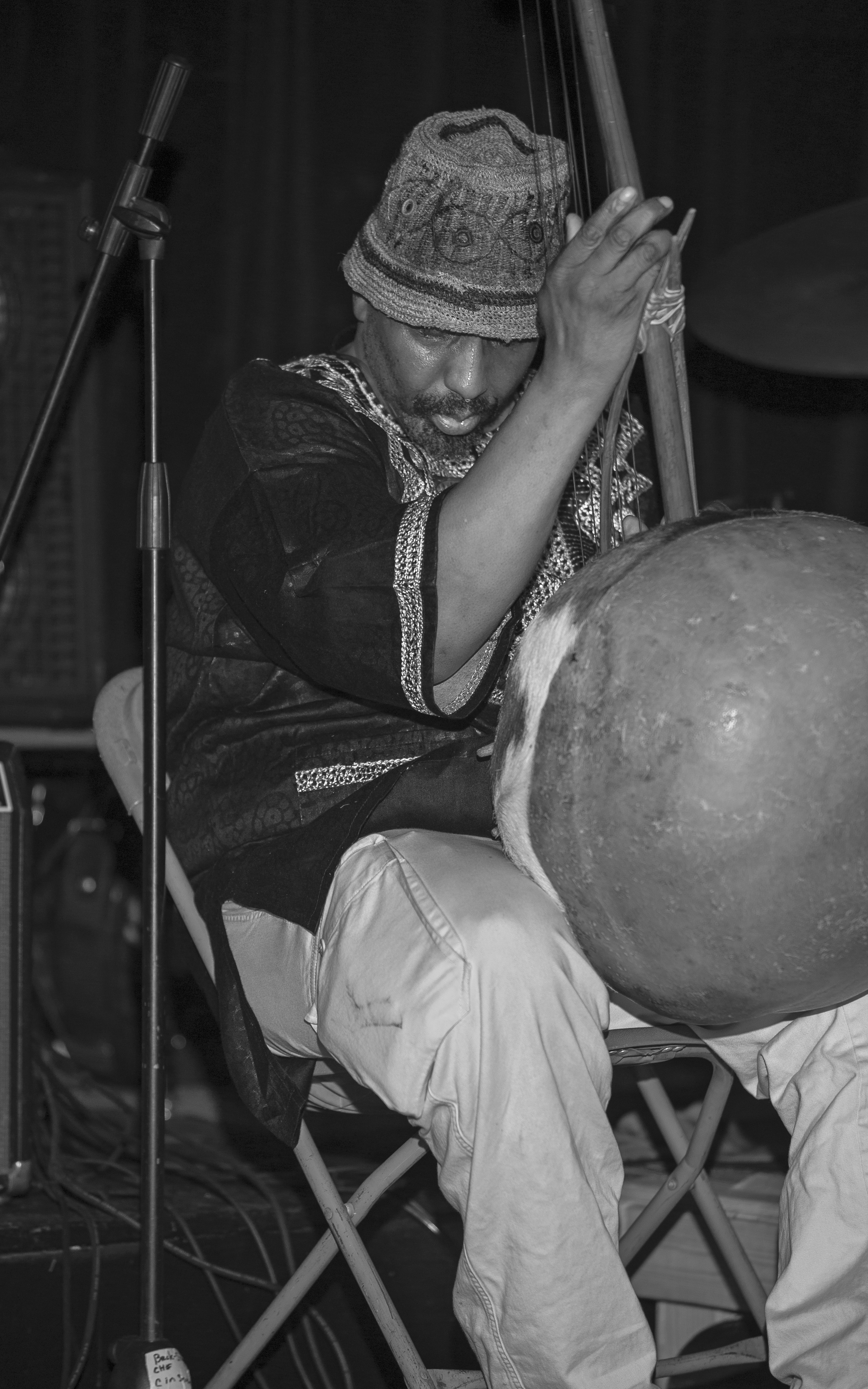
William Parker, Vision Festival 2008. Photo by Marek Lazarski

William Parker (born January 10, 1952) is an American free jazz double bassist. Beginning in the 1980s, Parker played with Cecil Taylor for over a decade, and he has led the Little Huey Creative Music Orchestra since 1981. The Village Voice named him "the most consistently brilliant free jazz bassist of all time" and DownBeat has called him "one of the most adventurous and prolific bandleaders in jazz".

== Early life and career ==
Parker was born in the Bronx, New York City, and grew up in the Melrose housing project. His first instrument was the trumpet, followed by the trombone and cello. Parker was not formally trained as a classical player, but in his youth studied with Jimmy Garrison, Richard Davis, and Wilbur Ware in learning the tradition.

While Parker has been active since the early 1970s, he first came to public attention playing with pianist Cecil Taylor in the 1980s. He has performed in many of Peter Brötzmann's groups, and played with saxophonist David S. Ware from 1989 until his last concert performance in 2011. He is a member of the Other Dimensions In Music cooperative. His work as leader came to greater prominence in the 1990s with groups such as the Little Huey Creative Music Orchestra and In Order to Survive.

Parker's "breakout" albums were released in the early 2000s, first with the William Parker Quartet (with saxophonist Rob Brown, drummer Hamid Drake, and trumpeter Lewis Barnes): O'Neal's Porch was included in Best of 2001 lists in The New York Times, DownBeat, and the Jazz Journalists Association; in 2002, Raining on the Moon, featuring guest Leena Conquest, received rave reviews in publications including Pitchfork. The album Sound Unity by the William Parker Quartet was chosen as one of Amazon.com's Top 100 Editor's Picks of 2005. Petit Oiseau was chosen as one of the best jazz disks of 2008 by The Wall Street Journal, the BBC's Radio Three, The Village Voice, and PopMatters. Double Sunrise Over Neptune, also released in 2008, was listed as one of the top 10 2008 (through end of August) Jazz CDs at Amazon.

Increasing prominence throughout the 2000s also led to a revisiting of his back catalogue, with the release of a number of early recordings.

Parker is a prominent musician in the New York City experimental jazz scene, where he leads a number of groups and is associated with the Vision Festival, organized by his wife, the dancer Patricia Nicholson; he is also frequently noted for his community dedication, mentorship, and status as "free-jazz caretaker" and "unofficial mayor of the New York improvisational scene".

He has performed at music festivals around the world, including the Guelph Jazz Festival in southern Ontario.

Parker frequently plays arco. Bass has been his primary instrument for the duration of his career, but he also plays trumpet, tuba, bamboo flutes, shakuhachi, flute, double reeds, the West African kora, gembri, and donso ngoni, an instrument first introduced to him by Don Cherry.

In 2006, Parker was awarded the Resounding Vision Award from Nameless Sound. In March 2007, his book, Who Owns Music?, was published by buddy's knife jazzedition in Cologne, Germany. Who Owns Music? assembles his political thoughts, poems, and musicological essays.

In June 2011, Parker began publishing his ongoing interviews with creative musicians in the experimental music scene, some taken on their deathbeds. To date, Conversations I-IV have been released by RogueArt, with more volumes slated. Parker's conversations, inspired by Arthur Taylor's Notes and Tones (1977), are one of the only extant archives from this corner of the jazz scene. The books are accompanied by records, a mix of Parker's free solos and interview clips, and published photos by scene photographer Jacques Bisceglia.

== Discography ==
=== As leader ===
| Release year | Artist | Title | Label |
|---|---|---|---|
| 1980 | William Parker | Through Acceptance of the Mystery Peace | Centering Records |
| 1994 | William Parker & the Little Huey Creative Music Orchestra | Flowers Grow in My Room | Centering |
| 1995 | William Parker | In Order to Survive | Black Saint |
| 1995 | William Parker | Testimony | Zero In |
| 1996 | William Parker / In Order to Survive | Compassion Seizes Bed-Stuy | Homestead |
| 1997 | William Parker & the Little Huey Creative Music Orchestra | Sunrise in the Tone World | AUM Fidelity |
| 1997 | William Parker | Lifting the Sanctions | No More |
| 1998 | William Parker / In Order to Survive | The Peach Orchard | AUM Fidelity |
| 1999 | William Parker / In Order to Survive | Posium Pendasem | FMP |
| 2000 | William Parker & the Little Huey Creative Music Orchestra | Mayor of Punkville | AUM Fidelity |
| 2000 | William Parker Trio | Painter's Spring | Thirsty Ear |
| 2001 | William Parker Quartet | O'Neal's Porch | AUM Fidelity |
| 2001 | William Parker | Song Cycle | Boxholder |
| 2002 | William Parker Quartet featuring Leena Conquest | Raining on the Moon | Thirsty Ear |
| 2002 | William Parker Clarinet Trio | Bob's Pink Cadillac | Eremite |
| 2002 | William Parker & the Little Huey Creative Music Orchestra | Raincoat in the River | Eremite |
| 2002 | William Parker Trio | ... and William Danced | Ayler Records |
| 2003 | William Parker Violin Trio | Scrapbook | Thirsty Ear |
| 2003 | William Parker & the Little Huey Creative Music Orchestra | Mass for the Healing of the World | Black Saint |
| 2003 | William Parker | Fractured Dimensions | FMP |
| 2003 | William Parker & the Little Huey Creative Music Orchestra | Spontaneous | Splasc(H) |
| 2005 | William Parker | Luc's Lantern | Thirsty Ear |
| 2005 | William Parker Quartet | Sound Unity | AUM Fidelity |
| 2006 | William Parker Bass Quartet featuring Charles Gayle | Requiem | Splasc(H) |
| 2006 | William Parker | Long Hidden: The Olmec Series | AUM Fidelity |
| 2006 | William Parker & the Little Huey Creative Music Orchestra | For Percy Heath | Victo |
| 2007 | William Parker Double Quartet | Alphaville Suite | RogueArt |
| 2007 | William Parker / The Inside Songs Of Curtis Mayfield | The Inside Songs of Curtis Mayfield: Live in Rome | Rai Trade |
| 2007 | William Parker / Raining on the Moon | Corn Meal Dance | AUM Fidelity |
| 2008 | William Parker | Double Sunrise Over Neptune | AUM Fidelity |
| 2008 | William Parker Quartet | Petit Oiseau | AUM Fidelity |
| 2010 | William Parker | I Plan to Stay a Believer: The Inside Songs of Curtis Mayfield | AUM Fidelity |
| 2010 | William Parker Organ Quartet | Uncle Joe's Spirit House | Centering |
| 2010 | William Parker | At Somewhere There | Barnyard Records |
| 2011 | William Parker | Crumbling In The Shadows Is Fraulien Miller's Stale Cake | Centering |
| 2011 | William Parker & ICI Ensemble | Winter Sun Crying | NEOS Jazz |
| 2012 | William Parker Orchestra | Essence of Ellington: Live in Milano | Centering |
| 2012 | William Parker | Centering. Unreleased Early Recordings 1976–1987 | NoBusiness |
| 2013 | William Parker Quartet | Live In Wroclove | ForTune |
| 2013 | William Parker | Wood Flute Songs | AUM Fidelity |
| 2015 | William Parker | For Those Who Are, Still | AUM Fidelity |
| 2015 | William Parker / Raining on the Moon | Great Spirit | AUM Fidelity |
| 2016 | William Parker ft. Lisa Sokolov and Cooper-Moore | Stan's Hat Flapping in the Wind | Centering |
| 2017 | William Parker Quartets | Meditation/Resurrection | AUM Fidelity |
| 2018 | William Parker | Lake Of Light: Compositions For Aquasonics | Gotta Let It Out |
| 2018 | William Parker | Voices Fall From The Sky | Centering |
| 2018 | William Parker | Flower In a Stained-Glass Window -&- The Blinking of The Ear | Centering |
| 2019 | William Parker / In Order to Survive | Live/Shapeshifter | AUM Fidelity |
| 2021 | William Parker | Migration of Silence Into and Out of the Tone World (Volumes 1–10) | Centering |
| 2021 | William Parker | Mayan Space Station | AUM Fidelity |
| 2021 | William Parker | Painters Winter | AUM Fidelity |
| 2022 | William Parker | Universal Tonality | Centering |

=== As co-leader ===
| Release year | Artist | Title | Label |
|---|---|---|---|
| 1994 | Peter Brötzmann / Gregg Bendian / William Parker | Sacred Scrape / Secret Response | Rastascan |
| 1996 | Derek Bailey, John Zorn, William Parker | Harras | Avant |
| 1996 | Rashid Bakr / Frode Gjerstad / William Parker | Seeing New York From The Ear | Cadence Jazz Records |
| 1999 | David Budbill & William Parker | Zen Mountains/Zen Streets: A Duet For Poet & Improvised Bass | Boxholder |
| 1999 | Ye-Ren: Toshi Makihara, Gary Hassay, and William Parker | Another Shining Path | Drimala |
| 2000 | Fred Anderson, Hamid Drake, Kidd Jordan, William Parker | 2 Days in April | Eremite |
| 2001 | William Parker & Hamid Drake | Piercing the Veil | AUM Fidelity |
| 2002 | Peter Brötzmann, William Parker, Michael Wertmüller | Nothung | In Tone Music |
| 2003 | William Parker, Joe Morris, Hamid Drake | Eloping with the Sun | Riti |
| 2006 | Kidd Jordan / Hamid Drake / William Parker | Palm of Soul | AUM Fidelity |
| 2007 | William Parker & Hamid Drake | Summer Snow | AUM Fidelity |
| 2007 | Anders Gahnold, William Parker, & Hamid Drake | The Last Dances | Ayler Records |
| 2008 | Anthony Braxton, Milford Graves, William Parker | Beyond Quantum | Tzadik |
| 2009 | Gerald Cleaver, William Parker, Craig Taborn | Farmers by Nature | AUM Fidelity |
| 2010 | Ninni Morgia & William Parker | Prism | Ultramarine |
| 2011 | Farmers by Nature (Cleaver, Parker, Taborn) | Out of This World's Distortions | AUM Fidelity |
| 2013 | William Parker / Conny Bauer / Hamid Drake | Tender Exploration | Jazzwerkstatt |
| 2014 | Billy Bang & William Parker | Medicine Buddha | NoBusiness |
| 2014 | Farmers by Nature (Cleaver, Parker, Taborn) | Love and Ghosts | AUM Fidelity |
| 2015 | Oliver Lake & William Parker | To Roy | Intakt |
| 2017 | William Parker & Stefano Scodanibbio | Bass Duo | Centering |
| 2020 | Parker, Matthew Shipp, Daniel Carter, Gerald Cleaver | Welcome Adventure! Vol. 1 | 577 Records |
| 2022 | Andrew Cyrille, William Parker, and Enrico Rava | 2 Blues for Cecil | TUM Records |
| 2022 | Peter Brötzmann, Milford Graves, and William Parker | Historic Music Past Tense Future | Black Editions Archive |
| 2024 | William Parker, Hamid Drake, Cooper-Moore | Heart Trio | AUM Fidelity |

=== As sideman ===
With Fred Anderson

- Blue Winter (Eremite, 2005)

With Billy Bang

- The Fire from Within (Soul Note, 1981)
- Live at Carlos 1 (Soul Note, 1984)

With Albert Beger

- Evolving Silence, Vol. 1 (2005)
- Evolving Silence, Vol. 2 (2006)

With John Blum (pianist)

- Astrogeny (Eremite, 2005)

With Peter Brötzmann

- Never Too Late But Always Too Early (Eremite, 2003)
- The Bishop's Move (Les Disques Victo, 2004)

With Peter Brötzmann Chicago Tentet

- Stone/Water (Okka Disk, 2000)
- Short Visit To Nowhere (Okka Disk, 2002)
- Broken English (Okka Disk, 2002)
- American Landscapes 1 (Okka Disc, 2007)
- American Landscapes 2 (Okka Disc, 2007)

With the Brötzmann Clarinet Project

- Berlin Djungle (FMP, 1987)

With Brötzmann's Die Like A Dog Quartet

- Die Like a Dog: Fragments of Music, Life and Death of Albert Ayler (FMP, 1994)
- Little Birds Have Fast Hearts, No. 1 (FMP, 1998)
- Little Birds Have Fast Hearts, No. 2 (FMP, 1999)
- From Valley to Valley (Eremite, 1999)
- Aoyama Crows (FMP, 2002)
- Close Up (FMP, 2011)

With Rob Brown

- Breath Rhyme (Silkheart Records, 1990)
- High Wire (Soul Note, 1996)
- Round the Bend (Bleu Regard, 2002)
- The Big Picture (Marge, 2004)
- Crown Trunk Root Funk (AUM Fidelity, 2008)

With Roy Campbell, Joe McPhee & Warren Smith

- Tribute to Albert Ayler Live at the Dynamo (Marge, 2009)

With Daniel Carter and Federico Ughi

- LIVE! (577 Records, 2017)
- Navajo Sunrise (Rudi Records. 2013)
- The Dream (577 Records, 2006)

With Bill Dixon

- Thoughts (Soul Note, 1985 [1987])
- Vade Mecum (Soul Note, 1994)
- Vade Mecum II (Soul Note, 1994)

With Hamid Drake and Bindu

- Blissful (RogueArt, 2008)

With Marco Eneidi

- Cherry Box (Eremite, 2000)

With Charles Gayle

- Touchin' on Trane (FMP, 1991 [1993])
- Translations (Silkheart, 1993)
- Raining Fire (Silkheart, 1993)
- Blue Shadows (Silkheart, 1993 [2008])
- More Live at the Knitting Factory (Knitting Factory, 1993)
- Consecration (Black Saint, 1993)
- Daily Bread (Black Saint, 1995)
- Live at Crescendo (Ayler, 2008)

With Frode Gjerstad

- Remember To Forget (Circulasione Totale, 1998)
- Ultima (Cadence Jazz Records, 1999)
- The Other Side (Ayler Records, 2006)
- On Reade Street (FMR Records, 2008)

With Alan Glover

- Kings Of Infinite Space (Omolade Music 2006)
- The Juice Quartet Archives (Omolade Music 2010)

With Wayne Horvitz

- Some Order, Long Understood (Black Saint, 1982)

With Gianni Lenoci

- Secret Garden (Silta)

With Frank Lowe

- Black Beings (ESP-Disk', 1973)
- The Loweski (ESP-Disk', 2012)

With Jimmy Lyons

- Wee Sneezawee (Black Saint, 1983)
- The Box Set (Ayler Records, 2003)

With Raphe Malik

- Last Set: Live at the 1369 Jazz Club (Boxholder, 2004)
- ConSequences (Eremite, 1999)
- Companions (Eremite, 2002)

With Michael Marcus

- Under The Wire (Enja, 1990)

With Thollem McDonas & Nels Cline

- The Gowanus Session (Porter, 2012)

With the Melodic Art-Tet (Charles Brackeen, Ahmed Abdullah, Parker, Roger Blank, Tony Waters)

- Melodic Art–Tet (NoBusiness, 2013)

With Roscoe Mitchell

- This Dance Is for Steve McCall (Black Saint, 1993)
- Nine to Get Ready (ECM, 1997)

With Jemeel Moondoc

- First Feeding (Muntu, 1977)
- The Evening of the Blue Men (Muntu, 1979)
- Konstanze's Delight (Soul Note, 1983)
- Nostalgia in Times Square (Soul Note, 1986)
- New World Pygmies (Eremite, 1999)
- New World Pygmies vol. 2 (Eremite, 2002)
- Live at Glenn Miller Café Vol 1 (Ayler, 2002)
- Live in Paris (Cadence, 2003)
- Muntu Recordings (NoBusiness, 2009)

With Joe Morris

- Illuminate (Leo, 1995)
- Elsewhere (Homestead, 1996)
- Invisible Weave (No More, 1997)
- Altitude (AUM Fidelity, 2012)

With Other Dimensions In Music

- Other Dimensions In Music (Silkheart, 1990)
- Now! (Aum Fidelity, 1998)
- Time Is of the Essence Is Beyond Time (Aum Fidelity, 2000)
- Live at the Sunset (Marge, 2007)
- Kaiso Stories (Silkheart, 2011)

With Ivo Perelman

- Cama de Terra (Homestead, 1996)
- En Adir (Music & Arts, 1997)
- Sound Hierarchy (Music & Arts, 1997)
- Serendipity (Leo, 2013)
- Book of Sound (Leo, 2014)

With Hugh Ragin

- Revelation (Justin Time, 2004)

With Matthew Shipp

- Points (Silkheart, 1992)
- Circular Temple (Quinton, 1992)
- Zo (Rise, 1994)
- Critical Mass (2.13.61, 1995)
- Prism (Brinkman, 1996)
- The Flow of X (2.13.61, 1997)
- By the Law of Music (HatART, 1997)
- The Multiplication Table (hatOLOGY, 1998)
- Strata (hatOLOGY, 1998)
- DNA (Thirsty Ear, 1999)
- Magnetism (Bleu Regard, 1999)
- Pastoral Composure (Thirsty Ear, 2000)
- Expansion, Power, Release (hatOLOGY, 2001)
- New Orbit (Thirsty Ear, 2001)
- Equilibrium (Thirsty Ear, 2003)
- Our Lady of the Flowers (RogueArt, 2015)

With Steve Swell

- Swimming in a Galaxy of Goodwill and Sorrow (RogueArt, 2007)

With Cecil Taylor

- The Eighth (HatHut, 1986)
- Winged Serpent (Sliding Quadrants) (Soul Note, 1987)
- Olu Iwa (Soul Note, 1987)
- Live in Bologna (Leo, 1987)
- Live in Vienna (Leo, 1987)
- Tzotzil/Mummers/Tzotzil (Leo, 1988)
- Alms/Tiergarten (Spree) (FMP, 1988)
- In Florescence (A&M, 1989)
- Looking (Berlin Version) Corona (FMP, 1989)
- Looking (Berlin Version) The Feel Trio (FMP, 1989)
- Celebrated Blazons (FMP, 1990)
- 2 Ts for a Lovely T, (Codanza Records, 1990 [2002])
- CT: The Dance Project (FMP, 1990 [2008])

With David S Ware

- Passage to Music (Silkheart 1988)
- Great Bliss, Vol. 1 (Silkheart 1991)
- Great Bliss, Vol. 2 (Silkheart 1991)
- Flight of I (DIW 1992)
- Third Ear Recitation (DIW 1992)
- Earthquation (DIW 1994)
- Cryptology (Homestead 1995)
- Oblations and Blessings (Silkheart, 1996)
- DAO (Homestead 1996)
- Godspelized (DIW, 1996)
- Wisdom of Uncertainty (AUM Fidelity, 1997)
- Go See the World (Columbia, 1998)
- Surrendered (Columbia, 2000)
- Corridors & Parallels (AUM Fidelity, 2001)
- Freedom Suite (AUM Fidelity, 2002)
- Threads (Thirsty Ear, 2003)
- Live in the World (Thirsty Ear, 2005)
- BalladWare (Thirsty Ear, 1999 [2006])
- Renunciation (AUM Fidelity, 2007)
- Live in Vilnius (NoBusiness Records 2007)
- Shakti (AUM Fidelity, 2009)
- Onecept (AUM Fidelity, 2009)
- Planetary Unknown (AUM 2010)
- Live at Jazzfestival Saalfelden 2011 (AUM 2011)
- Live in New York, 2010 (AUM Fidelity, 2017)

== Books ==
- Who Owns Music? (buddy's knife jazzedition, 2007)
- Conversations I (RogueArt, 2010)
- Conversations II (RogueArt, 2015)
- Conversations III (RogueArt, 2019)
- Conversations IV (RogueArt, 2023)

== Films ==
- 2001 – Inside Out in the Open (2001). Directed by Alan Roth. Asymmetric Pictures. Distributed by Third World Newsreel.
