= Corn Meal Dance =

Studio album by William Parker / Raining on the Moon
- Released: September 4, 2007
- Recorded: January 3, 2007
- Studio: Systems Two Studio, Brooklyn, New York City
- Genre: Jazz
- Length: 69:40
- Label: AUM Fidelity; AUM 043
- Producer: William Parker

William Parker chronology
Summer Snow (2005)	Corn Meal Dance (2007)	Alphaville Suite (2007)

Corn Meal Dance is an album by American jazz bassist and composer William Parker's Raining on the Moon, which was recorded in 2007 and released on the AUM Fidelity label.

== Reception ==
Professional ratings
Review scores
Source	Rating
AllMusic	4.5/5 stars
PopMatters	7/10 stars
The Penguin Guide to Jazz Recordings	4/4 stars

The review for AllMusic stated "These evocative, vocal-based tracks may seem surprising to those used to Parker's usual fare, but one listen through Corn Meal Dance will covert the suspicious". All About Jazz said "Corn Meal Dance is another great recording from an artist whose talent seems to have no limits".

Other reviewers were more reserved. PopMatters's review observed "Corn Meal Dance is hardly the best of William Parker, but as yet another facet of his considerable jazz spectrum it is a graceful expansion of territory. Whether it is for the jazz content, the politics, or the accessible jazz-soul grooves, this latest release for the outstanding jazz bassist is a strong effort". The JazzTimes review noted "the album would’ve benefited had the stronger performances in the middle and at the end been brought to the fore".

== Track listing ==
All compositions by William Parker except as indicated

1. "Doctor Yesterday" – 8:45
2. "Tutsi Orphans" – 7:17
3. "Poem for June Jordan" – 3:04
4. "Soledad" – 9:57
5. "Corn Meal Dance" – 9:02
6. "Land Song" – 11:40
7. "Prayer" – 3:58
8. "Old Tears" (Parker, Leena Conquest) – 8:41
9. "Gilmore's Hat" – 7:16

== Personnel ==
- William Parker – bass
- Leena Conquest – vocals
- Louis Barnes – trumpet
- Rob Brown – alto saxophone
- Eri Yamamoto – piano
- Hamid Drake – drums
