= Craig Taborn discography =

Craig Taborn is a pianist, keyboard and electronics player, chiefly in jazz. By the end of 2020, he had appeared on 14 albums as a leader or co-leader and more than 100 as a sideman.

== As leader/co-leader ==
An asterisk (*) after the year indicates that it is the year of release.

Year recorded	Year released	Title	Label	Notes
1994	1994	Craig Taborn Trio	DIW	Trio, with Jaribu Shahid (bass), Tani Tabbal (drums)
2001	2001	Light Made Lighter	Thirsty Ear	Trio, with Chris Lightcap (bass), Gerald Cleaver (drums)
2004	2004	Junk Magic	Thirsty Ear	Quartet, with Aaron Stewart (tenor sax), Mat Maneri (viola), Dave King (drums)
2010	2011	Avenging Angel	ECM	Solo piano
2012	2013	Chants	ECM	Trio, with Thomas Morgan (bass), Gerald Cleaver (drums)
2015	2016	Flaga: Book of Angels Volume 27	Tzadik	Trio, with Christian McBride (bass), Tyshawn Sorey (drums) composed by John Zorn
2015	2017	Ljubljana	Clean Feed	Duo, co-led with Mats Gustafsson (slide sax, baritone sax)
2016	2017	Daylight Ghosts	ECM	Quartet, with Chris Speed (tenor saxophone, clarinet), Chris Lightcap (bass), Dave King (drums)
2016	2018	Octopus	Pyroclastic	Duo, co-led with Kris Davis (piano)
2017	2017	Highsmith	Tzadik	Duo, co-led with Ikue Mori (electronics)
2017	2019	Da'at	Tzadik	Six tracks solo piano; two tracks duo, with Vadim Neselovskyi (piano); other tracks do not feature Taborn
2018	2019	The Transitory Poems	ECM	Duo, co-led with Vijay Iyer (piano)
2018	2019	Golden Valley Is Now	Intakt	Trio, co-led with Reid Anderson (electric bass, electronics), Dave King (drums)
2020*	2020	Compass Confusion	Pyroclastic	As "Junk Magic"; quintet, with Chris Speed (tenor sax, clarinet), Mat Maneri (viola), Erik Fratzke (bass), Dave King (drums)
2020	2021	Shadow Plays	ECM	Solo piano; in concert
2022	2023	hEARoes	Rogueart	Trio, co-led with Joëlle Léandre (bass), Mat Maneri (viola); in concert
2022	2024	Weird of Mouth	Otherly Love	Trio, co-led with Mette Rasmussen (alto sax, percussion), Ches Smith (drums, percussion)

== As sideman ==
An asterisk (*) after the year indicates that it is the year of release.

Year recorded	Leader	Title	Label	Notes
2005	Lotte Anker	Triptych	Leo	Trio, with Gerald Cleaver (drums)
2005	Lotte Anker	Live at the Loft	ILK Music	Trio, with Gerald Cleaver (drums); in concert
2008	Lotte Anker	Floating Islands	ILK Music	Trio, with Gerald Cleaver (drums); in concert
2002*	Art Ensemble of Chicago	Selected Recordings	ECM	
2014*	Diego Barber	Tales	Sunnyside	Duo
2000	Tim Berne	Sensitive	Screwgun	Trio, with Tom Rainey (drums); in concert
2001	Tim Berne	The Shell Game	Thirsty Ear	Trio, with Tom Rainey (drums)
2001	Tim Berne	Science Friction	Screwgun	Quartet, with Marc Ducret (guitar), Tom Rainey (drums)
2003	Tim Berne	The Sublime And	Thirsty Ear	Quartet, with Marc Ducret (guitar), Tom Rainey (drums); in concert
2003	Tim Berne	+size	Screwgun	As Science Friction; quintet, with Herb Robertson (trumpet), Marc Ducret (guitar), Tom Rainey (drums); in concert; released 2020
2003–2004	Tim Berne	Electric and Acoustic Hard Cell Live	Screwgun	Trio, with Tom Rainey (drums); in concert
2005	Tim Berne	Feign	Screwgun	Trio, with Tom Rainey (drums)
2007	Tim Berne	The Cosmos	Screwgun	Trio, with Tom Rainey (drums); in concert
2003	David Binney	Welcome to Life	Mythology	Sextet, with Chris Potter (tenor sax), Scott Colley (bass), Adam Rogers (guitar), Brian Blade (drums)
2006	David Binney	Cities and Desire	Criss Cross	Quintet, with Mark Turner (tenor sax), Thomas Morgan (bass), Dan Weiss (drums, tabla, vocals)
2006	David Binney	Out of Airplanes	BK	With Bill Frisell (guitar) Eiyvind Opsvik (bass), Kenny Wollesen (drums); Adam Rogers (guitar) added on some tracks
2009*	David Binney	Third Occasion	Mythology	With Scott Colley (bass), Brian Blade (drums), Ambrose Akinmusire (trumpet), Brad Mason (trumpet, flugelhorn), Corey King and Andy Hunter (trombone)
2011	David Binney	Graylen Epicenter	Mythology	With Chris Potter (tenor sax), Ambrose Akinmusire (trumpet), Wayne Krantz (guitar), Eivind Opsvik (bass), Brian Blade and Dan Weiss (drums), Kenny Wollesen (percussion, vibes), Roberto Boccato (percussion), Gretchen Parlato (vocals); Nina Geiger (vocals) added on one track
2012	David Binney	Lifted Land	Criss Cross	Quartet, with Eivind Opsvik (bass), Tyshawn Sorey (drums)
2012	Jakob Bro	December Song	Loveland	Quintet, with Bill Frisell (guitars), Lee Konitz (alto sax), Thomas Morgan (bass)
2007	Rob Brown	Crown Trunk Root Funk	Aum Fidelity	Quartet, with William Parker (bass), Gerald Cleaver (drums)
2010	Rob Brown	Unknown Skies	RogueArt	Trio, with Nasheet Waits (drums); in concert
1993	James Carter	JC on the Set	DIW	Quartet, with Jaribu Shahid (bass), Tani Tabbal (drums)
1994	James Carter	Jurassic Classics	DIW	Quartet, with Jaribu Shahid (bass), Tani Tabbal (drums)
1994	James Carter	The Real Quiet Storm	Atlantic	Quartets, with Dave Holland and Jaribu Shahid (bass; separately), Leon Parker and Tani Tabbal (drums; separately)
1996	James Carter	Conversin' with the Elders	Atlantic	Quartet, with Jaribu Shahid (bass), Tani Tabbal (drums)
1998	James Carter	In Carterian Fashion	Atlantic	Taborn plays with Jaribu Shahid (bass), Tani Tabbal (drums), plus Cassius Richmond (alto sax), Dwight Adams (trumpet), Kevin Carter (guitar) on some tracks
2000	Gerald Cleaver	Adjust	Fresh Sound	Sextet, with Andrew Bishop (clarinet, soprano sax, tenor sax), Mat Maneri (violin), Ben Monder (guitar), Reid Anderson (electric bass, acoustic bass)
2008	Gerald Cleaver	Farmers by Nature	AUM Fidelity	As the band "Farmers by Nature". Trio, with William Parker (bass)
2009	Gerald Cleaver	Be It as I See It	Fresh Sound	Also credited to "Uncle June"
2010	Gerald Cleaver	Out of This World's Distortions	AUM Fidelity	As the band "Farmers by Nature"
2011	Gerald Cleaver	Love and Ghosts	AUM Fidelity	As the band "Farmers by Nature"; in concert
2003*	Steve Coleman	Lucidarium	Label Bleu	Includes 19 musicians
2005	Scott Colley	Architect of the Silent Moment	Cam Jazz	
2009	Scott Colley	Empire	Cam Jazz	Quintet, with Ralph Alessi (trumpet), Bill Frisell (electric guitar), Brian Blade (drums)
2016*	Kris Davis	Duopoly	Pyroclastic	Duo
2002	Dave Douglas	Freak In	RCA Bluebird	
2002-2003	Marty Ehrlich	Line on Love	Palmetto	With Michael Formanek (bass), Billy Drummond (drums)
2017*	Amir ElSaffar	Not Two	New Amsterdam	With the Rivers of Sound ensemble: Ole Mathisen (tenor sax), Zafer Tawil (oud), Tareq Abboushi (buzuq), Carlo DeRosa (bass), Nasheet Waits (drums), Dena ElSaffar (violin), Naseem Alatrash (cello), George Ziadeh (oud, vocals), Mohamed Saleh (oboe), Fabrizio Cassol (alto sax), J. D. Parran (bass sax, clarinet), Jason Adasiewicz (vibraphone), Miles Okazaki (guitar), Rajna Swaminathan (mridangam), Tim Moore (dumbek, riqq)
2010	Shane Endsley	Then the Other	Low Electrical	Quartet, with Matt Brewer (bass), Ted Poor (drums)
2009	Michael Formanek	The Rub and Spare Change	ECM	With Tim Berne and Gerald Cleaver
2009	Michael Formanek	Other Zones	Circular File	With Tim Berne and Gerald Cleaver
2011	Michael Formanek	Small Places	ECM	With Tim Berne and Gerald Cleaver
2014	Michael Formanek	Pre-Apocalyptic	Out Of Your Head Records	With Tim Berne and Gerald Cleaver
2007*	Gang Font	The Gang Font Feat. Interloper	Thirsty Ear	
2003*	Ya Ya Fornier	Bearcat	Random Chance	Taborn plays with David Murray (tenor sax), Jaribu Shahid (bass), Gerald Cleaver (drums), Asson (percussion)
2004	Drew Gress	7 Black Butterflies	Premonition	Quintet, with Tim Berne (alto sax), Ralph Alessi (trumpet), Tom Rainey (drums)
2004	Drew Gress	The Irrational Numbers	Premonition	Quintet, with Tim Berne (alto sax), Ralph Alessi (trumpet), Tom Rainey (drums)
2013*	Drew Gress	The Sky Inside	Pirouet	Quintet, with Tim Berne (alto sax), Ralph Alessi (trumpet), Tom Rainey (drums)
2010*	Jonathon Haffner	Life on Wednesday	Cachuma	With Wayne Krantz (guitar), Eivind Opsvik (bass), Jochen Rueckert and Kenny Wollesen (drums)
2012	Dave Holland	Prism	Dare2	Quartet, with Kevin Eubanks (guitar), Eric Harland (drums)
2017	Dave Holland	Uncharted Territories	Dare2	Quartet, with Evan Parker (tenor saxophone), Ches Smith (drums)
2001	Susie Ibarra	Songbird Suite	Tzadik	Trio, with Jennifer Choi (violin)
2004	Susie Ibarra	Folkloriko	Tzadik	With Jennifer Choi (violin), Roberto Rodriguez (percussion), Wadada Leo Smith (trumpet)
1999*	Innerzone Orchestra	Programmed	Astralwerks	
2000*	Bill Laswell	Dub Chamber 3	ROIR	
2007*	Bill Laswell	Inamorata	Ohm Resistance	Credited to "Method of Defiance"; Taborn plays on one track
2016*	Ingrid Laubrock	Serpentines	Intakt	With Peter Evans (trumpet, piccolo trumpet), Miya Masaoka (koto), Sam Pluta (electronics), Dan Peck (tuba), Tyshawn Sorey (drums)
2011*	Okkyung Lee	Noisy Love Songs	Tzadik	With Ikue Mori (electronics), Satoshi Takeishi (percussion, electronics), Cornelius Dufallo (violin), Peter Evans (trumpet), John Hollenbeck (percussion), Christopher Tordini (bass)
2020*	Steve Lehman	The People I Love	PI	Quartet
2008	Chris Lightcap	Deluxe	Clean Feed	With Chris Cheek and Tony Malaby (tenor sax), Gerald Cleaver (drums); Andrew D'Angelo (alto sax) added on some tracks
2013	Chris Lightcap	Epicenter	Clean Feed	With Chris Cheek and Tony Malaby (tenor sax), Gerald Cleaver (drums);
2020*	Chris Lightcap	SuperBigmouth	Pyroclastic	Octet, including Tony Malaby, Chris Cheek, Gerald Cleaver
2000	Mat Maneri	Blue Decco	Thirsty Ear	Quartet, with William Parker (bass), Gerald Cleaver (drums)
2001	Mat Maneri	Sustain	Thirsty Ear	Quartet, with Joe McPhee (soprano sax), William Parker (bass), Gerald Cleaver (drums)
2004	Mat Maneri	Pentagon	Thirsty Ear	With Ben Gerstein (trombone), Joe Maneri (piano, alto sax, vocals), Jamie Saft (mellotron), John Herbert (bass), John McLellan and Tom Rainey (drums), T.K. Ramakrishnan (mridangam), Sonia Maneri (vocals)
2005	Meat Beat Manifesto	At the Center	Thirsty Ear	With Peter Gordon (flute), Jack Dangers (bass, bass flute, bass clarinet), David King (drums, percussion)
2010	Nicole Mitchell	Emerald Hills	RogueArt	Quartet, with David Boykin (tenor sax), Chad Taylor (drums)
2014*	Nicole Mitchell	The Secret Escapades of Velvet Anderson	RogueArt	Quartet, with David Boykin (tenor sax), Chad Taylor (drums, guitar)
1997	Roscoe Mitchell	Nine to Get Ready	ECM	With "The Note Factory" (including Matthew Shipp as second pianist)
2001	Roscoe Mitchell	Song for My Sister	PI	With Vijay Iyer (piano), Leon Dorsey and Jaribu Shahid (bass), Vincent Davis and Gerald Cleaver (drums), Spencer Barefield (guitar), Corey Wilkes (trumpet)
2004	Roscoe Mitchell	Composition/Improvisation Nos. 1, 2 & 3	ECM	With Evan Parker (tenor sax, soprano sax), Anders Svanoe (alto sax, baritone sax), Corey Wilkes (trumpet, flugelhorn), John Rangecroft (clarinet), Neil Metcalfe (flute), Nils Bultmann (viola), Philipp Wachsmann (violin), Marcio Mattos (cello), Barry Guy and Jaribu Shahid (bass), Paul Lytton and Tanni Tabbal (drums, percussion); in concert
2005	Roscoe Mitchell	Turn	RogueArt	Quintet, with Corey Wilkes (trumpet, flugelhorn, percussion), Jaribu Shahid (double bass, electric bass, percussion), Tani Tabbal (drums, percussion)
2007	Roscoe Mitchell	Far Side	ECM	With "The Note Factory" (including Vijay Iyer as second pianist); in concert
2014*	Roscoe Mitchell	Conversations I	Wide Hive	Trio, with Kikanju Baku (percussion)
2014*	Roscoe Mitchell	Conversations II	Wide Hive	Trio, with Kikanju Baku (percussion)
2015	Roscoe Mitchell	Bells for the South Side	ECM	
2018–19	Hafez Modirzadeh	Facets	Pi	Duo; other tracks feature other pianists
1999*	Francisco Mora Catlett	World Trade Music	Community Projects	
2005*	Francisco Mora Catlett	River Drum	Premier Cru	
2007	Francisco Mora Catlett	Outerzone	Premier Cru	
2010*	Francisco Mora Catlett	Outerzone 2010 Andromeda M-31	AACE	
2011	Francisco Mora Catlett	Live at the Bronx Museum	AACE	
2017*	Miles Okazaki	Trickster	PI	Quartet, with Anthony Tidd (bass), Sean Rickman (drums)
2002	Eivind Opsvik	Overseas	Fresh Sound	With Jason Rigby (soprano sax, bass clarinet), Loren Stillman (alto sax), Tony Malaby (tenor sax), Wells Hanley and Jacob Sacks (piano), Gerald Cleaver and Jeff Davis (drums), Dan Weiss (percussion)
2004	Eivind Opsvik	Overseas II	Fresh Sound	With Loren Stillman (alto sax), Tony Malaby (tenor sax), Jacob Sacks (piano), Jeff Davis and Kenny Wolleson (drums)
2020?	Kassa Overall	I Think I'm Good	Brownswood	With various
2023?	Kassa Overall	Animals	WARP	With various
2004	Evan Parker	Boustrophedon	ECM	Band includes Roscoe Mitchell; in concert
2012	Evan Parker	Rocket Science	More Is More	Quartet, with Sam Pluta (laptop), Peter Evans (trumpet)
2013*	Mario Pavone	Arc Trio	Playscape	Trio, with Gerald Cleaver (drums); in concert
2021	Ivo Perelman	Brass and Ivory Tales	Fundacja Słuchaj	Duo; Taborn plays on one CD
2005	Chris Potter	Underground	Sunnyside	Most tracks quartet, with Wayne Krantz (guitar), Nate Smith (drums); two tracks quintet, with Adam Rogers (guitar) added
2007	Chris Potter	Follow the Red Line	Sunnyside	Quartet, with Adam Rogers (guitar), Nate Smith (drums); in concert
2009	Chris Potter	Ultrahang	ArtistShare	Quartet, with Adam Rogers (guitar), Nate Smith (drums)
2011	Chris Potter	The Sirens	ECM	Quintet, with David Virelles (prepared piano, celeste, harmonium), Larry Grenadier (bass), Eric Harland (drums)
2013	Chris Potter	Imaginary Cities	ECM	Septet plus string quartet; with Adam Rogers (guitar), Steve Nelson (vibraphone, marimba), Fima Ephron (bass guitar), Scott Colley (bass), Nate Smith (drums), Mark Feldman and Joyce Hammann (violin), Lois Martin (viola), Dave Eggar (cello)
2022	Chris Potter	Got the Keys to the Kingdom: Live at the Village Vanguard	Edition	Quartet, with Scott Colley (bass), Marcus Gilmore (drums)
1999	Hugh Ragin	An Afternoon in Harlem	Justin Time	With David Murray (bass clarinet), Jaribu Shahid (bass), Bruce Cox and Andrew Cyrille (drums), Amiri Baraka (vocals)
2000	Hugh Ragin	Fanfare & Fiesta	Justin Time	With Clark Terry (flugelhorn), Dontae Winslow (trumpet), James Zollar (trumpet), Omar Kabir (trumpet), Jaribu Shahid (bass), Bruce Cox (drums)
2001	Hugh Ragin	Feel the Sunshine	Justin Time	With Assif Tsahar (saxophone), Jaribu Shahid (bass), Tani Tabbal (drums)
2012*	Mike Reed	Clean on the Corner	482 Music	With Greg Ward (alto sax), Tim Haldeman (tenor sax), Jason Roebke (bass); Josh Berman (cornet) added on some tracks. Also credited to "People, Places & Things"
2007	Pete Robbins	Do the Hate Laugh Shimmy	Fresh Sound New Talent	
2002*	Roberto Rodriguez	El Danzon de Moises	Tzadik	With Peter Apfelbaum (soprano sax), Matt Darriau (trompeta china, clarinet, Mark Feldman (violin), Susie Ibarra (percussion), Brad Jones (bajo), David Krakauer (clarinet), Ted Reichman (accordion), Roberto Juan Rodriguez (percussion), Roberto Luis Rodriguez (trumpet), Marcus Rojas (baritone horn, tuba), Jane Scarpantoni (cello)
1997	David Rogers	The World Is Not Your Home	Jumble	Mostly sextet, with Marion Hayden (bass), Gerald Cleaver (drums, percussion), Mark Stone (xylophone, vibraphone, percussion), Derek Bermel (clarinet, xylophone, percussion)
2010	Louis Sclavis	Eldorado Trio	Clean Feed	Trio, with Tom Rainey (drums)
2011	Alex Sipiagin	Destinations Unknown	Criss Cross	Sextet, with Chris Potter (tenor sax), David Binney (alto sax), Boris Kozlov (bass), Eric Harland (drums)
2015	Ches Smith	The Bell	ECM	Trio, with Mat Maneri (viola)
2020	Ches Smith	Interpret It Well	Pyroclastic	Quartet, with Bill Frisell (guitar), Mat Maneri (viola)
2002–2004	Wadada Leo Smith	Lake Biwa	Tzadik	With Wes Brown (bass), Jennifer Choi (violin), Anthony Coleman, Yuko Fujiyama and Jamie Saft (piano), Erik Friedlander (cello), Susie Ibarra, Kwaku Kwaakye Obeng and Gerald Cleaver (drums), John Lindberg (bass), Marc Ribot (guitar), Marcus Rojas (tuba), John Zorn (alto sax), orchestra
2018–2022	Thomas Strønen	Relations	ECM	Taborn plays on two tracks
2001	Assif Tsahar	Embracing the Void	Hopscotch	With Ori Kaplan (alto saxophone), Alex Harding (baritone saxophone, tenor saxophone), Oscar Noriega (bass clarinet, alto saxophone), Curtis Hasselbring, Reut Regev and Steve Swell (trombone), Antoine Brye, Matt Lavell and Taylor Ho Bynum (trumpet), Tom Abbs (bass), Andrew Barker (drums)
2005	David Torn	Prezens	ECM	Quartet, with Tim Berne (alto sax), Tom Rainey (drums)
2006	David Torn	Slipped On A Bar	Screwgun	Quartet, with Tim Berne (alto sax), Tom Rainey (drums)
2007	David Torn	xForm	Screwgun	Quartet, with Tim Berne (alto sax), Tom Rainey (drums)
2019*	David Torn	Sun of Goldfinger	ECM	With Tim Berne, (alto sax), Ches Smith (drums, electronics, tanbou), Mike Baggetta and Ryan Ferreira (guitar), Scorchio Quartet
2017*	(Various)	The Passion of Charlie Parker	Impulse!	
2018*	Dan Weiss	Starebaby	Pi	Quintet, with Matt Mitchell (piano, Prophet-6, modular synthesizers), Ben Monder (guitars), Trevor Dunn (electric bass)
2018	Winged Serpents	Six Encomiums for Cecil Taylor	Tzadik	Solo piano; each of five other pianists plays one solo piece

== Remixes ==
Year recorded	Title	Label	Notes
2004*	The Val-Inc. Remixes	Thirsty Ear	Val-Inc remixes of tracks from Junk Magic; quartet, with Aaron Stewart (tenor sax), Mat Maneri (viola), Dave King (drums)

Sources: and others.
