= Abboushi =

Abboushi is a surname. Notable people with the surname include:

- Tareq Abboushi (born 1978), Palestinian-American musician and composer
- Fahmi al-Abboushi (1895–1975), Palestinian politician and banker
