= Daylight Ghosts =

Studio album by Craig Taborn
- Released: February 3, 2017
- Recorded: May 2016
- Studios: Avatar (New York, New York)
- Genre: Jazz
- Length: 54:41
- Label: ECM
- Producer: Manfred Eicher

Craig Taborn chronology
Flaga: Book of Angels Volume 27 (2016)	Daylight Ghosts (2017)	Ljubljana (2017)

Professional ratings
Review scores
Source	Rating
All About Jazz	4/5 stars
AllMusic	4.5/5 stars
Blurt	4/5 stars
Financial Times	4/5 stars
The Guardian	4/5 stars
The Irish Times	4/5 stars
Pitchfork	8.2/10
PopMatters	8/10
RTÉ.ie	4/5 stars
The Times	4/5 stars

Daylight Ghosts is an album by Craig Taborn, with Chris Speed (tenor saxophone, clarinet), Chris Lightcap (double bass, bass guitar), and Dave King (drums, percussion). It was released by ECM Records in 2017.

== Background ==
Taborn's previous releases as leader for ECM Records were the solo piano Avenging Angel from 2011 and the trio recording Chants, released two years later. For Daylight Ghosts, Taborn wanted to record something "simple and clear".

== Recording and music ==
All of the compositions are by Taborn, except for "Jamaican Farewell", a 3/4 waltz by Roscoe Mitchell. "'The Shining One' mixes quick, boppish exchanges of motifs with twisting, written-unison lines. 'New Glory' is exhilarating free-jazz with a Chick Corea-like Latin vamp in it, and there are deep clarinet and bass interludes, brief bursts of rock-piano riffing and subtle minglings of electronic loops and long-tone sax sounds on 'Phantom Ratio'." On "Ancient", "the quartet snakes around a bass vamp in C, in a series of contrapuntal variations, before (in Taborn's words) 'falling together', as if the four instruments had fused into one". Taborn also used a Farfisa organ and synthesizers (including Prophet 6) on the album.

== Release ==
Daylight Ghosts was released on February 3, 2017, by ECM.

== Reception ==
Critic John Fordham wrote that, "Only players with deep jazz insights and wide musical references could have made this fine album." Writing for JazzTimes, Colin Fleming stated, "the challenge in making a hybrid acoustic/electronic album sound like a genuine blend rests in large part with ensemble play, from which solos emerge—tendrils as extensions of the whole. This four-piece unit, led by Craig Taborn on piano and various electronic accouterments [...] proves itself befitting of the specters of the title, moving in diaphanous forms with haunting presence." RTÉ.ie's Paddy Kehoe stated, "At times you sense here solid, cerebral cubes of sound being made to melt in the heat of performance, yet it’s not as simple as that, as Taborn and company do so much more. Recommended." Michael Toland of Blurt commented, "A remarkable work that takes his artistry to the next level, Daylight Ghosts puts Taborn in the league of the jazz greats." Cormac Larkin of The Irish Times added, "Eclectic and episodic, like a vaguely unsettling art movie, Daylight Ghosts glows with the heat of invention, but it’s couched in language that Taborn’s predecessors would have understood."

== Track listing ==
ECM – ECM 2527

All music is composed by Craig Taborn, except track 7, which was written by Roscoe Mitchell.

No.	Title	Length
1.	"The Shining One"	3:34
2.	"Abandoned Reminder"	7:46
3.	"Daylight Ghosts"	7:36
4.	"New Glory"	3:14
5.	"The Great Silence"	5:37
6.	"Ancient"	8:15
7.	"Jamaican Farewell"	5:39
8.	"Subtle Living Equations"	4:31
9.	"Phantom Ratio"	8:29
Total length:		54:41

== Personnel ==
- Craig Taborn – piano, electronics
- Chris Speed – tenor saxophone, clarinet
- Chris Lightcap – double bass, bass guitar
- Dave King – drums, percussion

== Charts ==
Chart	Peak position (2017)
US Top Jazz Albums (Billboard)	7
