= At the Old Office =

Live album by Joe Morris
- Released: 2000
- Recorded: November 6, 1999
- Venue: The Old Office, Knitting Factory, New York City
- Genre: Jazz
- Length: 75:01
- Label: Knitting Factory
- Producer: Joe Morris

Joe Morris chronology
Soul Search (2000)	At the Old Office (2000)	Singularity (2001)

At the Old Office is an album by American jazz guitarist Joe Morris which was recorded live in 1999 and released on the Knitting Factory label. The record features his quartet with violinist Mat Maneri, bassist Chris Lightcap and drummer Gerald Cleaver, the same lineup as the previous studio album Underthru.

== Reception ==
Professional ratings
Review scores
Source	Rating
Allmusic	4/5 stars
The Penguin Guide to Jazz	3.5/4 stars

In his review for AllMusic, David R. Adler states "Though short of Sonny Sharrock energy-wise and Derek Bailey in terms of innovation, Morris nonetheless holds high qualities of inventiveness, singular purpose, and individual vision."

The Penguin Guide to Jazz observes that "Maneri's viola has a wonderfully rich quality that sits well with the guitar, probably more comfortably than the electric violin he characteristically uses, and on 'Matter of Fact' the exchange of lead lines is virtuosic and completely convincing."

The All About Jazz review by Glenn Astarita says about the musicians that "collectively represent one of the finest, cutting edge bands in modern jazz, as the music presented on this new release extends some of their now familiar micro-tonal/improvisational style developments and concepts."

In his review for JazzTimes Peter Margasak states "What most distinguishes this group from Morris' other projects is the rhythm section: Cleaver manages to swing while breaking down time and Lightcap limns the proceedings with clarity, although neither one of them is afraid of ratcheting up the energy level when things get a little static."

== Track listing ==
All compositions by Joe Morris except as indicated

1. "Matter of Fact" (Morris, Maneri, Lightcap, Cleaver) – 20:26
2. "Don't Say Too Much" – 24:00
3. "Coil" – 19:58
4. "Closeout" (Morris, Maneri, Lightcap, Cleaver) – 10:37

== Personnel ==
- Joe Morris - guitar
- Mat Maneri – viola
- Chris Lightcap – bass
- Gerald Cleaver – drums
