= Fanfare & Fiesta =

Studio album by Hugh Ragin Trumpet Ensemble with Special Guest Clark Terry
- Released: 2001
- Recorded: June 18 and 19, 2000
- Studio: Sound on Sound Studios, New York City
- Genre: Free jazz
- Length: 1:09:13
- Label: Justin Time; JUST 152-2
- Producer: Hugh Ragin, Jim West

Hugh Ragin chronology
Back to Saturn (2000)	Fanfare & Fiesta (2001)	Feel the Sunshine (2002)

Fanfare & Fiesta is an album by the Hugh Ragin Trumpet Ensemble, led by trumpeter Ragin, and featuring guest artist Clark Terry on flugelhorn and vocals, along with trumpeters Dontae Winslow, James Zollar, and Omar Kabir, pianist Craig Taborn, bassist Jaribu Shahid, and drummer Bruce Cox. It was recorded on June 18 and 19, 2000, at Sound on Sound Studios in New York City, and was released in 2001 by Justin Time Records.

== Reception ==
Professional ratings
Review scores
Source	Rating
AllMusic	4/5 stars
The Penguin Guide to Jazz	3/4 stars

In a review for AllMusic, Glenn Astarita wrote: "Ragin and co. interrogate blues-based themes amid emphatic choruses, torrid soloing, slight injections of free jazz, and climactic opuses. Fanfare & Fiesta is an audacious and refreshing exposition, supplemented by memorable compositions and the ensemble's often dazzling interplay. Recommended!"

Greg Robinson of JazzTimes called the album "an enjoyable treatise on the state of the modern jazz trumpet," and commented: "In spite of the potential for screechiness, the performances never degenerate into mindless pyrotechnical display. While the individual trumpeters' influences may be all over the map, there is such good humor evident in the ensemble... that an anything-goes atmosphere prevails... Making Fanfare and Fiesta must have been a dream come true for Ragin."

Writing for All About Jazz Jim Santella remarked: "It's each soloist's creative input that makes Ragin's second Justin Time album a success. The ensemble's members in turn, whether extended or in brief fours, wear a free attitude in their search for something new in jazz." Another AAJ reviewer wrote: "Much more than a single musical tribute or musical element, Fanfare & Fiesta is a full-bodied CD that brings together all of Ragin's influences for the first time and presents what may become his working ensemble."

== Track listing ==
1. "Finger Filibuster" (Clark Terry) – 7:57
2. "Fanfare & Fiesta" (Hugh Ragin) – 10:23
3. "Spacemen" (Clark Terry) – 6:25
4. "Barnyard Scuffel Shuffel" (Lester Bowie) – 6:05
5. "How Strange" (Lester Bowie) – 5:58
6. "Harmonic Architecture" (Hugh Ragin) – 13:15
7. "A Prayer for Lester Bowie" (Hugh Ragin) – 12:21
8. "Emergency Exit" (Hugh Ragin) – 7:45

== Personnel ==
- Hugh Ragin – trumpet
- Clark Terry – flugelhorn (tracks 1 and 3), vocals (track 3)
- Dontae Winslow – trumpet
- James Zollar – trumpet
- Omar Kabir – trumpet
- Craig Taborn – piano
- Jaribu Shahid – bass
- Bruce Cox – drums
