= Farmers by Nature =

Live album by Gerald Cleaver, William Parker, Craig Taborn
- Released: 2009
- Recorded: June 19, 2008
- Venue: The Stone, New York City
- Genre: Jazz
- Length: 65:07
- Label: AUM Fidelity
- Producer: Gerald Cleaver, Steven Joerg

Gerald Cleaver chronology
Adjust (2000)	Farmers by Nature (2009)	Be It as I See It (2010)

Farmers by Nature is an album by the collective jazz trio of Gerald Cleaver (drums), William Parker (bass), and Craig Taborn (piano). Cleaver specifically brought the trio together. They had previously played together on Rob Brown's album Crown Trunk Root Funk. The album was recorded live at The Stone in 2008 and released by the AUM Fidelity label.

== Reception ==
Professional ratings
Review scores
Source	Rating
AllMusic	4/5 stars
Down Beat	3.5/5 stars

In his review for AllMusic, Thom Jurek wrote: "Farmers by Nature is not for the casual jazz fan. It gives up its secrets slowly, but the gems hidden in this sonic earth are plentiful, poetic, and remarkable."

In Down Beat, Bill Meyer wrote: "The trio ranges freely between pulse-based lyricism, surging energy and gnomic exchanges, as though they were following an elliptical orbit that takes them far out, only to come close again."

== Track listing ==
All compositions by Cleaver/Parker/Taborn

1. "Korteh Khah" – 3:18
2. "The Night" – 8:42
3. "Cranes" – 16:40
4. "Not Unlike Number 10" – 15:35
5. "In Trees" – 6:57
6. "Fieda Mytlie" – 13:55

== Personnel ==
- Gerald Cleaver - drums
- William Parker – bass
- Craig Taborn – piano
