= Song for My Sister =

Studio album by Roscoe Mitchell
- Released: 2002
- Recorded: February 2002
- Studio: Audio for the Arts, Madison, Wisconsin
- Genre: Jazz
- Length: 60:14
- Label: Pi Recordings

Roscoe Mitchell chronology
8 O'Clock: Two Improvisations (2001)	Song for My Sister (2002)	The Bad Guys (2003)

Song for My Sister is an album by American jazz saxophonist Roscoe Mitchell which was recorded in 2002 and released on Pi Recordings. It was the third studio recording by the Note Factory, a nonet with twin rhythm sections. Vijay Iyer and Craig Taborn will later record duo album The Transitory Poems in 2019.

== Reception ==
Professional ratings
Review scores
Source	Rating
AllMusic	4/5 stars
The Penguin Guide to Jazz	3/4 stars

In his review for AllMusic, Don Snowden states "Song for My Sister is a strong album that takes in a wide variety of musical settings—short pieces, long pieces, excursions into tradition, textures, and abstraction—without losing cohesiveness. It's an always interesting journey."

The Penguin Guide to Jazz says "As an entity, the ensemble feels shapeless in the way it handles various talents, and Mitchell himself never imposes enough of himself to unite it all."

In a review for JazzTimes Bill Shoemaker notes that "The deepest aspect of Song for My Sister is that it is merely a glimpse of Mitchell's potential with the Note Factory."

The BBC review by Bill Tilland states "Overall, this CD puts on display the diversity of Mitchell's musical vision, and while most listeners will respond more fully to some of its elements than to others, everything here is eminently worthy of attention."

== Track listing ==
All compositions by Roscoe Mitchell

1. "Song for My Sister" – 10:55
2. "Sagitta" – 4:18
3. "this" – 9:07
4. "When the Whistle Blows" – 3:36
5. "The Megaplexian" – 4:54
6. "Step One, Two, Three" – 8:28
7. "The Inside of a Star" – 3:02
8. "Wind Change" – 11:26
9. "Count-Off" – 4:38

== Personnel ==
- Roscoe Mitchell - soprano sax, alto sax, tenor sax, flute, bass recorder, great bass recorder, percussion
- Leon Dorsey, Jaribu Shahid - bass
- Vijay Iyer, Craig Taborn - piano
- Vincent Davis - drums, percussion
- Gerald Cleaver - drums, marimba
- Spencer Barefield - guitars
- Corey Wilkes - trumpet

Special Guest

- Anders Svanoe - clarinet, bass clarinet
- Willy Walter - bassoon
- Janse H. Vincent - violin
- Nels Bultmann - viola
