= Life in the Sugar Candle Mines =

Studio album by Black Host
- Released: 2013
- Recorded: 2012
- Studio: Trout Recording, Brooklyn
- Genre: Jazz
- Length: 77:38
- Label: Northern Spy

Gerald Cleaver chronology
Out of This World's Distortions (2011)	Life in the Sugar Candle Mines (2013)	Love and Ghosts (2014)

Life in the Sugar Candle Mines is the debut album by Black Host, a free jazz quintet led by drummer Gerald Cleaver, who is joined by alto saxophonist Darius Jones, guitarist Brandon Seabrook, pianist Cooper-Moore and bassist Pascal Niggenkemper. It was released in 2013 on the Northern Spy label.

== Reception ==
Professional ratings
Review scores
Source	Rating
Down Beat	4/5 stars

The Down Beat review by Areif Sless-Kitain notes that "the drummer’s credit for 'sound design' hints at his ringleader role, yet Cleaver functions more as a conduit than a featured player."

In his review for JazzTimes Steve Greenlee states "Anyone who still thinks free jazz is unpleasant random noises needs to hear Life in the Sugar Candle Mines, 78 minutes of loosely structured but highly conceived music by some of the best in the avant-garde game."

== Track listing ==
All compositions by Gerald Cleaver except as indicated

1. "Hover" – 16:10
2. "Ayler Children" – 11:23
3. "Citizen Rose" – 8:04
4. "Test-Sunday" – 6:35
5. "Amsterdam / Frames" (Jones/Seabrook/Ashton/Niggenkemper/Cleaver) – 6:01
6. "Gromek" – 12:58
7. "Wrestling" (Béla Bartók) – 5:59
8. "May Be Home" – 10:28

== Personnel ==
- Darius Jones - alto sax
- Brandon Seabrook – guitar
- Cooper-Moore – piano, synth
- Pascal Niggenkemper – bass
- Gerald Cleaver - drums, sound design
