= Unexplained Phenomena =

Live album by Rob Brown
- Released: 2011
- Recorded: June 23, 2010
- Venue: Abrons Arts Center, New York City
- Genre: Jazz
- Length: 55:14
- Label: Marge
- Producer: Gérard Terronès

Rob Brown chronology
Natural Disorder (2010)	Unexplained Phenomena (2011)	Unknown Skies (2011)

Unexplained Phenomena is an album by American jazz saxophonist Rob Brown, which was recorded live at the 2010 Vision Festival and released on the French Marge label. He leads a new quartet with vibraphonist Matt Moran, bassist Chris Lightcap and drummer Gerald Cleaver.

== Reception ==
Professional ratings
Review scores
Source	Rating
Down Beat	3/5 stars

The Down Beat review states:

Brown shows that he also can conform to conventions, which is reflected in the structure of the pieces and the instrumentation. Ironically, the saxophonist’s playing is sonically more extreme: proof that even though Brown’s tone has been getting more polished over the years, its ferocity and tartness always come back to the fore when he is at his most incandescent.

— Alain Drouot

== Track listing ==
All compositions by Rob Brown

1. "Kite" – 11:00
2. "Wonder/Wander Off" – 9:56
3. "Tic Toc" – 8:42
4. "Lurking/Looking" – 11:51
5. "Bell Tone" – 13:45

== Personnel ==
- Rob Brown – alto sax
- Matt Moran – vibraphone
- Chris Lightcap – bass
- Gerald Cleaver – drums
