= Gallery (Hugh Ragin and Marc Sabatella album) =

Studio album by Hugh Ragin and Marc Sabatella
- Released: 1999
- Recorded: June 23, 1998
- Studio: Dunn Hall, Potsdam, New York
- Genre: Free jazz
- Length: 1:04:17
- Label: CIMP; 177

Hugh Ragin chronology
An Afternoon in Harlem (1999)	Gallery (1999)	Back to Saturn (2000)

Gallery is an album by trumpeter Hugh Ragin and pianist Marc Sabatella. It was recorded on June 23, 1998, at Dunn Hall in Potsdam, New York, and was released in 1999 by the CIMP label.

== Reception ==
Professional ratings
Review scores
Source	Rating
AllMusic	4/5 stars
The Penguin Guide to Jazz	3/4 stars
The Virgin Encyclopedia of Jazz	3/5 stars
The Encyclopedia of Popular Music	3/5 stars

In a review for AllMusic, Steve Loewy wrote: "What is so attractive about this recording is the opportunity it offers to hear both musicians at length, occasionally sparring, but more often working hand-in-glove to produce some surprisingly lyrical gems. Ragin's roots are clearly in the tradition.... Together, they produce some beautiful sounds."

The authors of The Penguin Guide to Jazz Recordings called the album "rugged stuff, bluntly recorded."

Bill Shoemaker of JazzTimes commented: "There is a languid beauty to the music even when the material is built upon jagged contours, and there is a translucency to Ragin and Sabatella's exchanges even when the temperature of the music occasionally spikes; credit Ragin's ability to make any line sing, and Sabatella's sensitivity in curling around Ragin's statements." He also praised CIMP's live to two-track recording technique, which allows "Ragin's clarion horn to meld with a very full piano sound."

== Track listing ==
1. "Gallery" (Marc Sabatella) – 20:14
2. "Feel the Sunshine" (Hugh Ragin) – 24:23
3. "Harmonic Architecture" (Hugh Ragin) – 19:36

== Personnel ==
- Hugh Ragin – trumpet
- Marc Sabatella – piano
