= New Orbit =

Studio album by Matthew Shipp
- Released: 2001
- Recorded: September 14, 2000
- Studio: Seltzer Sound, New York City
- Genre: Jazz
- Length: 39:08
- Label: Thirsty Ear
- Producer: Matthew Shipp

Matthew Shipp chronology
Expansion, Power, Release (2001)	New Orbit (2001)	Songs (2002)

New Orbit is an album by American jazz pianist Matthew Shipp recorded in 2000 and released on Thirsty Ear's Blue Series. Shipp leads a quartet with trumpeter Wadada Leo Smith, bassist William Parker and drummer Gerald Cleaver.

== Reception ==
Professional ratings
Review scores
Source	Rating
The New Rolling Stone Album Guide	3.5/5 stars
Allmusic	4/5 stars
The Penguin Guide to Jazz	3.5/4 stars

In his review for AllMusic, Paula Edelstein states "New Orbit is an excellent delivery of avant-garde and free jazz that remains uncompromising, unrelenting, and totally individual."

The Penguin Guide to Jazz says that "The music is becoming more obviously accessible, yet more mysterious at the same time - a fascinating agenda."

The Pitchfork review by Matt LeMay states "With New Orbit, Matthew Shipp has crafted an album that manages to merge the accessibility and raw appeal of Pastoral Composure with adventurous new textures that go beyond anything he has produced in the past."

In his review for PopMatters, Andrew Johnson notes "Clocking in at a little under forty minutes, one of the most attractive aspects of Matthew Shipp's New Orbit is its brevity and focus."

== Track listing ==
All compositions by Matthew Shipp

1. "New Orbit" – 2:59
2. "Paradox X" – 4:31
3. "Orbit 2" – 3:39
4. "Chi" – 7:50
5. "Orbit 3" – 2:23
6. "U Feature" – 3:56
7. "Syntax" – 7:16
8. "Maze Hint" – 1:09
9. "Paradox Y" – 3:54
10. "Orbit 4" – 1:31

== Personnel ==
- Matthew Shipp – piano
- Wadada Leo Smith – trumpet
- William Parker – bass
- Gerald Cleaver – drums
