= Out of This World's Distortions =

Studio album by Farmers by Nature
- Released: 2011
- Recorded: June 24, 2010
- Studio: Scrootable Labs, New York City
- Genre: Jazz
- Length: 69:54
- Label: AUM Fidelity
- Producer: Gerald Cleaver, Steven Joerg

Gerald Cleaver chronology
Be It as I See It (2010)	Out of This World's Distortions (2011)	Life in the Sugar Candle Mines (2013)

Out of This World's Distortions is the second album by Farmers by Nature, a collective trio consisting of Gerald Cleaver on drums, William Parker on bass and Craig Taborn on piano. It was recorded in 2010 and released on the AUM Fidelity label. The first track is a tribute to saxophonist Fred Anderson, who died the evening before the recording.

== Reception ==
Professional ratings
Review scores
Source	Rating
AllMusic	4/5 stars

In his review for AllMusic, Phil Freeman notes that "The interactions between the three members of the trio are deeply sensitive. In contrast with Parker and Cleaver's work backing Matthew Shipp on several records from the first half of the 2000s, their playing behind Taborn is less about convulsive rhythm than about atmospheric effects."

In his review for JazzTimes Mike Shanley notes that "While the album runs in circles in a few spots, the trio wins points for showing how spare moments can have just as much merit as the wilder sections of improvisation."

== Track listing ==
All compositions by Cleaver/Parker/Taborn

1. "For Fred Anderson" – 8:31
2. "Tait's Traced Traits" – 18:07
3. "Out of This World's Distortions Grow Aspens and Other Beautiful Things" – 8:52
4. "Sir Snacktray Speaks" – 8:04
5. "Cutting's Gait" – 12:27
6. "Mud, mapped" – 13:53

== Personnel ==
- Gerald Cleaver - drums
- William Parker – bass
- Craig Taborn – piano
