= Soul Search =

Music album by Joe Morris

Studio album by Joe Morris
- Released: 2000
- Recorded: August 17, 1999
- Studio: Persona Sound, Cambridge, Massachusetts
- Genre: Jazz
- Length: 62:19
- Label: AUM Fidelity
- Producer: Joe Morris, Mat Maneri, Steven Joerg

Joe Morris chronology
Underthru (1999)	Soul Search (2000)	At the Old Office (2000)

Soul Search is an album by American jazz guitarist Joe Morris featuring a duo with violinist Mat Maneri, which was recorded in 1999 and released on the AUM Fidelity label.

== Reception ==
Professional ratings
Review scores
Source	Rating
AllMusic	4/5 stars
The Penguin Guide to Jazz	3.5/4 stars

In his review for AllMusic, Charie Wilmoth states "Maneri and Morris had developed utterly distinctive instrumental voices: Their senses of phrasing and harmony were, and are, uniquely theirs."

The Penguin Guide to Jazz notes that "The two stringed instruments frequently exchange roles, with Maneri producing big chords and Morris teasing out single-note lines at great speed."

The All About Jazz review by Glenn Astarita states "The musicians engage a very special musical language that is characterized by their remarkable intuition, distinctive craftsmanship and cultivated improvisational speak."

In his review for JazzTimes, Duck Baker states "There are breath-taking moments on Soul Search when the two players find their way into a little musical world that seems utterly undiscovered, and these sublime successes seem to lift the level of the music throughout."

== Track listing ==
All compositions by Joe Morris & Mat Maneri

1. "Slight Of Hand" – 8:04
2. "Adhesive" – 6:40
3. "Eyes Or Gaze" – 5:59
4. "Natural Number" - 7:57
5. "Versicolor" – 7:21
6. "Soul Search" – 2:25
7. "Flyer" – 5:13
8. "Micron" - 3:06
9. "Forwards And Sideways" – 7:08
10. "Pluralize" – 8:26

== Personnel ==
- Joe Morris - electric guitar
- Mat Maneri – electric violin
