= An Afternoon in Harlem =

Studio album by Hugh Ragin
- Released: 1999
- Recorded: December 6 and 7, 1998
- Studio: Sound on Sound Studios, New York City
- Genre: Free jazz
- Length: 1:10:50
- Label: Justin Time; JUST 127-2
- Producer: Hugh Ragin, Jim West

Hugh Ragin chronology
Metaphysical Question (1985)	An Afternoon in Harlem (1999)	Gallery (1999)

An Afternoon in Harlem is an album by trumpeter Hugh Ragin. It was recorded on December 6 and 7, 1998, at Sound on Sound Studios in New York City, and was released in 1999 by Justin Time Records. On the album, Ragin is joined by bass clarinetist David Murray, pianist Craig Taborn, bassist Jaribu Shahid, and drummers Bruce Cox and Andrew Cyrille. Amiri Baraka also appears on the track titled "When Sun Ra Gets Blue."

== Reception ==
Professional ratings
Review scores
Source	Rating
AllMusic	4/5 stars
The Penguin Guide to Jazz	3.5/4 stars

In a review for AllMusic, Michael G. Nastos called the album a "gem of a CD," and wrote: "Ragin effectively utilizes moderate lyricism and a bright, warm, well-rounded tone, stretching phrases and elongating ideas... He's a free bop player who explores modalities, no-time segments, and impressionistic views of the African-American heritage of his current Harlem home... If you're into bop with avant sensibilities, this is one you'll want in your collection."

The authors of The Penguin Guide to Jazz Recordings praised Ragin's "considerable range" and "full, almost vocalized tone," and stated that he "has grown steadily in stature since his first appearances as a leader."

Bill Shoemaker of JazzTimes commented: "Ragin establishes an inviting straight-up feel by opening the album with an easy swinging, mid-tempo blues and an uptempo boppish blues. Ragin then spends the remainder of the quartet performances slyly stretching the program to encompass free bop, avantish ballad forms, and envelope-pushing structures."

A reviewer for All About Jazz noted that Ragin's "total mastery of the trumpet allows him to deliver crystal clear melodies, blistering solos, and twisted screaming avant interludes without hesitation... While Ragin's emphasis on composition provides plenty of formal structure, he seems to exercise his creative powers most stunnningly in the free jazz and avant garde settings. In this end of the musical spectrum, Ragin's musical voice is unique and unparalleled."

== Track listing ==
Composed by Hugh Ragin.

1. "An Afternoon in Harlem" – 6:53
2. "Not a Moment Too Soon" – 3:09
3. "Braxton's Dues" – 7:16
4. "The Moors of Spain" – 15:47
5. "Wisdom and Overstanding" – 10:27
6. "In the Light at the End of the Underground Railroad" – 8:23
7. "When Sun Ra Gets Blue" – 18:55

== Personnel ==
- Hugh Ragin – trumpet
- David Murray – bass clarinet (tracks 6 and 7)
- Craig Taborn – piano
- Jaribu Shahid – bass
- Bruce Cox – drums (tracks 1–5, 7)
- Andrew Cyrille – drums (track 6), percussion (track 7)
- Amiri Baraka – voice (track 7)
