= Lake Biwa (album) =

Studio album by Wadada Leo Smith
- Released: November 2004
- Studio: Avatar (New York, New York)
- Genre: Avant-garde jazz
- Length: 69:34
- Label: Tzadik TZ 8008
- Producer: Wadada Leo Smith

Wadada Leo Smith chronology
Kabell Years: 1971-1979 (2004)	Lake Biwa (2004)	Saturn, Conjunct the Grand Canyon in a Sweet Embrace (2004)

Lake Biwa is a studio album by jazz trumpeter and composer Wadada Leo Smith released on John Zorn's Tzadik label in 2004. The album contains four pieces composed between 2000 and 2004.

== Reception ==
Professional ratings
Review scores
Source	Rating
Allmusic	4/5 stars
Penguin Guide to Jazz	4/4 stars
Tom Hull	B+

The Allmusic review states: "Lake Biwa is a delight, and is full of invention. The players here perform the work's written and improvised sections with a determined sense of attack that also includes warmth, humor, and the desire for collective discovery". Writing for All About Jazz, Kurt Gottschalk commented "Over four pieces ranging from 10 to 25 minutes, the ensemble truly is an orchestra. When called upon to step forward, the voices of Ribot and Zorn especially are unmistakable. But the rest of the time, the group breathes together like an orchestra rather than a session group group reading charts. The compositions themselves are both serious and exciting and violinist Jennifer Choi (a regular performer of Zorn's compositions) especially shines".

== Track listing ==
All compositions by Wadada Leo Smith.

1. "Lake Biwa; A Fullmoon Purewater Gold" - 11:14
2. "Sinai's Enclosed Garden of the Truth" - 23:50
3. "Diamondback Serpent in a House Full of Water and Still Rising" - 16:00
4. "Africana World" - 18:30

== Personnel ==
- Wadada Leo Smith - trumpet
- John Zorn - alto saxophone
- Marcus Rojas - tuba
- Jennifer Choi - violin
- Erik Friedlander - cello
- Marc Ribot - guitar
- Anthony Coleman, Yuko Fujiyama, Jamie Saft, Craig Taborn - piano
- Wes Brown, John Lindberg - bass
- Gerald Cleaver, Susie Ibarra, Kwaku Kwaakye Obeng - drums
