= Shadow Plays =

Live album by Craig Taborn
- Released: October 8, 2021
- Recorded: March 2, 2020
- Venue: Konzerthaus, Vienna
- Genre: Jazz, free improvisation
- Length: 1:16:21
- Label: ECM 2693
- Producer: Manfred Eicher

Craig Taborn chronology
Compass Confusion (2020)	Shadow Plays (2021)	hEARoes (2023)

Shadow Plays is a live solo piano album by Craig Taborn recorded at the Konzerthaus, Vienna, on March 2, 2020, and released on ECM in October the following year.

== Background ==
Taborn's previous solo piano album, Avenging Angel, was recorded in 2010. Since then, he had performed and recorded in a diverse range of bands and styles.

== Recording and music ==
The album was recorded at the Mozart-Saal of the Konzerthaus, Vienna, on March 2, 2020; the concert was billed as Avenging Angel II. All seven of the solo piano pieces were improvised. The album was produced by Manfred Eicher.

== Release and reception ==
Professional ratings
Review scores
Source	Rating
All About Jazz	4/5 stars
AllMusic	4.5/5 stars
DownBeat	4/5 stars
Financial Times	5/5 stars
Jazzwise	4/5 stars
Tom Hull	B+

Shadow Plays was released by ECM Records on 8 October 2021.

The AllMusic reviewer concluded: "Where Avenging Angel opened our ears to Taborn's consummate abilities to compose and organize simultaneously without surrendering his creativity, Shadow Plays extends that by offering a profound sense of intimacy with instrument and audience. It delivers fantastical groups of ideas that flow without undue force or ego to become something that is at once wondrous and revelatory."

The reviewer for the Financial Times wrote that the album features Taborn "delivering spontaneous masterworks with a majestic sense of form and captures his robust touch and uncanny sense of space in pristine sound".

== Track listing ==
All compositions by Craig Taborn

1. "Bird Templars" – 17:02
2. "Discordia Concors" – 8:57
3. "Conspiracy of Things" – 5:50
4. "Concordia Discors" – 11:59
5. "A Code with Spells" – 8:09
6. "Shadow Play" – 18:37
7. "Now in Hope" – 5:47

== Personnel ==
- Craig Taborn – piano
