= Compass Confusion =

Studio album by Junk Magic
- Released: Oct 30, 2020
- Genre: Electronic jazz
- Label: Pyroclastic Records; PR 12
- Producer: Craig Taborn

Craig Taborn chronology
Da'at (2019)	Compass Confusion (2020)	Shadow Plays (2021)

Compass Confusion is an album by the band Junk Magic, led by keyboardist Craig Taborn, and featuring saxophonist and clarinetist Chris Speed, violist Mat Maneri, electric bassist Erik Fratzke, and drummer David King. It was issued by Pyroclastic Records in 2020, 16 years after the group's initial release.

== Reception ==
Professional ratings
Review scores
Source	Rating
All About Jazz	3.5/5 stars
All About Jazz	3.5/5 stars
AllMusic	4/5 stars
DownBeat	3/5 stars
Financial Times	4/5 stars
Jazz Journal	4/5 stars
Jazzwise	4/5 stars
PopMatters	7/10 stars

In a review for DownBeat, John Murph wrote: "Forgoing orthodox concepts about jazz and EDM is crucial to one's enjoyment of Compass Confusion... the combo engages in spontaneous sound sculpting that places premiums on textual ingenuity, spatial awareness and vigorous interactive dialogue."

John Sharpe of All About Jazz stated: "Taborn brings a raft of influences, from minimalism to musique concrète, ambient, hip hop, krautrock, fusion and improv to bear... What's striking is how the improvising sensibility at work in other areas of Taborn's oeuvre manifests here, as he keeps piling new layers of sound one atop the other." AAJ's Mike Jurkovic noted that the album "pulls you along with a lush velvet hook in your mouth," while "reeling it in is a struggle but a blessing."

Writing for PopMatters, Will Layman commented: "There is a refinement to Craig Taborn's vision for this band. Compass Confusion is almost conservative in its focus and discipline. After all these years, that has become clear."

Jazz Journal's Andy Hamilton remarked: "The tracks are a mix of driving polyrhythm and ambient soundscape... A very thoughtful, rewarding synthesis of jazz and contemporary popular genres."

Thom Jurek's review for AllMusic states: "The music... is dark and moody, but far from depressing. If anything, there is mischievous delight as Taborn and company discover one another over and again in refracted sound design, murky abstraction, and head-nodding beats. Challenging and inquisitive, Compass Confusion is, like its 2004 predecessor, the sound of 'next.'"

Mike Hobart of the Financial Times wrote: "This long-delayed follow-up release finds Taborn in familiar company, blurring the boundaries between live performance and studio techniques with a confidence and depth of feeling that newcomers in the field rarely match... the band's quality of sound fully matches Taborn's clarity of vision."

In an article for Jazzwise, Thomas Rees called the album "remarkable," and commented: "Each of the tracks... is as beautiful, strange and surprising as the last... You could listen to this a hundred times and still find something interesting and new."

JazzWord's Ken Waxman described the album as "a varied program which pinpoints Taborn's skills as an orchestrator and sensitive composer... an enjoyable, unforced group work."

A reviewer for Monarch Magazine remarked: "Taborn's textured, probing compositions, inventive use of ambient techniques and artful sound design reveal a true musical visionary at work. The album's sonic meanderings often possess a narrative quality, inviting listeners to follow pathways of diverse sound, jagged grooves and angular melody which alternately murmur and swell in satisfying arcs and swirls, making Compass Confusion one of the most imaginative, rewarding records of the year."

Chris Robinson of Point of Departure stated that, in comparison with the group's first album, "Compass Confusion is more fluid, dynamic, and, despite the heavy use of electronics, more organic. The interface between the compositions, improvisations, sound design, and production is seamless, and the electronic elements sound richer and more nuanced. As a whole, the new album is highly cohesive and plot-driven, suggesting that the band's vision has become fully realized."

== Track listing ==
1. "Laser Beaming Hearts" – 7:10
2. "Dream and Guess" – 5:37
3. "Compass Confusion/ Little Love Gods" – 8:55
4. "The Science of Why Devils Smell Like Sulfur" – 10:37
5. "The Night Land" – 4:10
6. "Sargasso" – 8:35
7. "Sunsets Forever" – 5:31

== Personnel ==
- Craig Taborn – piano, keyboard
- Chris Speed – tenor saxophone, clarinet
- Mat Maneri – viola
- Erik Fratzke – electric bass
- David King – acoustic and electronic drums
