= Unknown Skies =

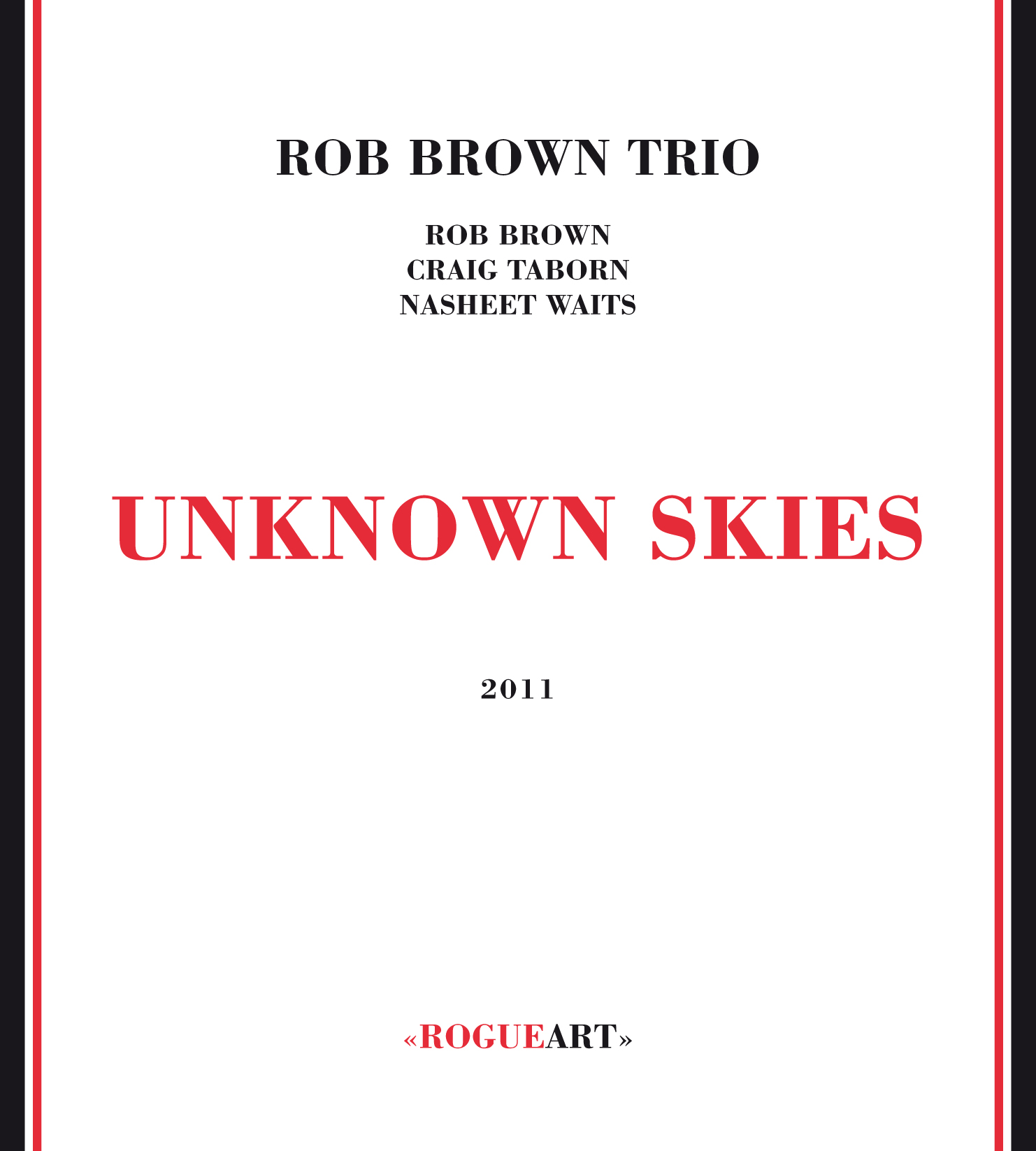

Live album by Rob Brown
- Released: 2011
- Recorded: January 30, 2010; Saint-Mandé, France
- Genre: Jazz
- Length: 61:58
- Label: RogueArt
- Producer: Michel Dorbon

Rob Brown chronology
| Unexplained Phenomena (2011) | Unknown Skies (2011) | Day in the Life of a City (2014) |

Unknown Skies is an album by American jazz saxophonist Rob Brown which was recorded live at 2010 Sons d'Hiver Festival in the suburbs of Paris, and released on the French RogueArt label. He leads a trio with pianist Craig Taborn and drummer Nasheet Waits. The group performed before at the 2009 Vision Festival. Brown thought the idea of such a trio, similar to the one which he formed on arriving New York in the mid-eighties with Matthew Shipp and Frank Bambara and took the name of Right Hemisphere, later a quartet for the eponymous album.

== Reception ==
Professional ratings
Review scores
| Source | Rating |
|---|---|
| Down Beat | 4/5 stars |

The Down Beat review by Alain Drouot notes that "Without a bass, the three musicians operate on a more leveled field, rely less on melodies, and have plenty of room to stretch and develop notions to the fullest."

The All About Jazz review by John Sharpe states "Brown revels in the license to roam, engendered by Taborn and Waits' intersecting lines. One of that select band of instrumentalists, whose soloing isn't dependent on repeated motifs as much as a constantly unfurling narrative, the reedman thrills with his sustained brilliance."

In his review for JazzTimes Lyn Horton says "This music is totally Rob Brown inspired, but also offers uniqueness in its contrasts."

== Track listing ==
All compositions by Rob Brown except as indicated

1. "A Fine Line" – 15:55
2. "Unknown Skies" – 16:31
3. "Bounce Back" – 13:25
4. "The Upshot" – 11:21
5. "Temerity" (Brown, Taborn, Waits) – 4:45

== Personnel ==
- Rob Brown – alto sax
- Craig Taborn - piano
- Nasheet Waits – drums
