= Songs (Matthew Shipp album) =

Studio album by Matthew Shipp
- Released: 2002
- Recorded: November 18, 2001
- Studio: The Studio, New York City
- Genre: Jazz
- Length: 46:57
- Label: Splasc(H)
- Producer: Matthew Shipp, Alan Schneider

Matthew Shipp chronology
New Orbit (2001)	Songs (2002)	Nu Bop (2002)

Songs is a solo album by American jazz pianist Matthew Shipp performing popular standards and spirituals, which was recorded in 2001 and released on the Italian Splasc(H) label. Its "We Free Kings" track is a Roland Kirk composition based on the Christmas carol "We Three Kings".

== Reception ==
Professional ratings
Review scores
Source	Rating
The New Rolling Stone Album Guide	3.5/5 stars
Allmusic	4.5/5 stars
The Penguin Guide to Jazz Recordings	3/4 stars

In his review for AllMusic, Steve Loewy states "The interpretations are original, disturbing at times, but also uplifting and lyrical. The pianist follows a strategy of laying down a melody and slowly deconstructing the piece, but what is remarkable is the way in which he never lets go of the underlying song even at the most extreme moments."

== Track listing ==
1. "We Free Kings" (John Henry Hopkins, Jr.) – 4:16
2. "There Will Never Be Another You" (Harry Warren / Mack Gordon) – 5:42
3. "Almighty Fortress Is Our God" (Martin Luther) – 5:01
4. "Con Alma" (Dizzy Gillespie) – 8:16
5. "Angel Eyes" (Matt Dennis / Earl Brent)– 5:35
6. "On Green Dolphin Street" (Bronislav Kaper / Ned Washington) – 3:53
7. "Bags' Groove" (Milt Jackson) – 3:25
8. "Yesterdays" (Jerome Kern / Otto Harbach) – 5:32
9. "East Broadway Run Down" (Sonny Rollins) – 5:17

== Personnel ==
- Matthew Shipp - piano
