= Love and Ghosts =

Live album by Farmers by Nature
- Released: 2014
- Recorded: Disc One; June 27, 2011; Disc Two; June 28, 2011
- Venue: Disc One; Studio des Resistants Cité de la Musique, Marseille; Disc Two; Petit Kursaal, Besançon
- Genre: Jazz
- Length: 139:53
- Label: AUM Fidelity
- Producer: Gerald Cleaver, Steven Joerg

Gerald Cleaver chronology
Life in the Sugar Candle Mines (2013)	Love and Ghosts (2014)

Love and Ghosts is the third album by Farmers by Nature, a collective trio consisting of Gerald Cleaver on drums, William Parker on bass and Craig Taborn on piano. The double disc set documents two complete, all improvised concerts recorded in France during their 2011 tour. It was released on the AUM Fidelity label.

== Reception ==
Professional ratings
Review scores
Source	Rating
Down Beat	4/5 stars

The Down Beat review by Bradley Bambarger says that "Something like Love And Ghosts can only be made through relationships of extraordinary empathy. There’s a lot of music going on here, more rewarding with every listen.""

In his review for JazzTimes Britt Robson notes that "The abundance of talent, trust, self-confidence, patience and intuition required to collectively improvise at such a high level for more than an hour at a time is possessed by the three members of Farmers by Nature and precious few others."

The PopMatters review by Will Layman states "It’s terrific to hear this kind of music, with its not-obvious but still emotional beauty, coming out of a culture that seems so constrained and plastic at times."

== Track listing ==
All compositions by Cleaver/Parker/Taborn

Disc One

1. "Love and Ghosts" – 18:05
2. "Without a Name" – 6:50
3. "Aquilo" – 16:10
4. "Seven Years In" – 16:21
5. "Massalia" – 12:29

Disc Two

1. "The Green City" – 9:16
2. "Bisanz" – 21:09
3. "Comté" – 17:58
4. "Castle #2" – 16:45
5. "Les Flâneurs" – 4:50

== Personnel ==
- Gerald Cleaver - drums, percussion
- William Parker – bass
- Craig Taborn – piano
