= Got the Keys to the Kingdom: Live at the Village Vanguard =

Live album by Chris Potter
- Released: February 17, 2023
- Recorded: February, 2022
- Genre: Jazz
- Length: 61:19
- Label: Edition Records
- Producer: Dave Stapleton and Louise Holland

Chris Potter chronology
Sunrise Reprise (2021)	Got the Keys to the Kingdom: Live at the Village Vanguard (2023)

Got the Keys to the Kingdom: Live at the Village Vanguard is a 2023 live album by saxophonist Chris Potter, his fourth released on Edition Records, recorded live at the Village Vanguard in NYC. Chris Potter is accompanied by Craig Taborn on piano, Scott Colley on bass and Marcus Gilmore on drums. The album features only cover songs which, in Potter's words, "are tunes people don’t usually play".

== Reception ==
Professional ratings
Review scores
Source	Rating
AllAboutJazz	4/5 stars

Chris May from All About Jazz gave it a favorable review, with 4 out of 5 stars and mentioned that "Potter deserve(d) an honorary set of keys to the Vanguard on the strength of it".

Jeff Cebulski from the website Chicago Jazz suggested that Chris Potter should be considered among the best living saxophonists, pointing out that the album "demonstrate(d) the remarkable depth and breadth of his talent" and "add(ed) to the great recordings from one of Jazz’s holy places".

Bill Milkowski from The Absolute Sound called Potter "the most potent and impactful tenor saxophonist of his generation", giving the album a five-star review.

Jon Turney from London Jazz News called the record outstanding and an "impressive display of twenty-first century jazz playing in full flow".

== Track listing ==
No.	Title	Writer(s)	Length
1.	"You Gotta Move"	Mississippi Fred McDowell	14:01
2.	"Nozani Na"	Amazonian folk tune; Edgar Roquette-Pinto and Heitor Villa-Lobos (transcr.)	10:53
3.	"Blood Count"	Billy Strayhorn	9:01
4.	"Klactoveedsedstene"	Charlie Parker	7:26
5.	"Olha Maria"	Antonio Carlos Jobim; Chico Buarque; Vinicius De Moraes	6:22
6.	"Got the Keys to the Kingdom"	traditional/spiritual	13:36

== Personnel ==
=== Musicians ===
- Chris Potter – tenor saxophone
- Craig Taborn – piano
- Scott Colley – bass
- Marcus Gilmore – drums

=== Technical personnel ===
- Dave Stapleton, Louise Holland – executive producer
- Tyler McDiarmid, Geoff Countryman – recording
- Christopher Allen – mixing
- Nate Wood – mastering
- Oli Bentley – artwork
