= Back to Saturn =

Studio album by Hugh Ragin Collective
- Released: 2000
- Recorded: August 10 and 11, 1993
- Studio: Eye in the Sky Sound, LaPorte, Colorado
- Genre: Free jazz
- Length: 1:05:28
- Label: Black Saint; 120160-2
- Producer: Flavio Bonandrini

Hugh Ragin chronology
Gallery (1999)	Back to Saturn (2000)	Fanfare & Fiesta (2001)

Back to Saturn (Dedicated to the Memory of Sun Ra) is an album by trumpeter Hugh Ragin and his Collective, featuring vibraphonist Greg Carroll, pianist Marc Sabatella, bassist Erik Turkman, and drummer Scott Gordan. It was recorded on August 10 and 11, 1993, at Eye in the Sky Sound in LaPorte, Colorado, and was released in 2000 by the Black Saint label.

== Reception ==
Professional ratings
Review scores
Source	Rating
AllMusic	4/5 stars
The Penguin Guide to Jazz	3/4 stars

In a review for AllMusic, Scott Yanow noted that the album "progress[es] logically from the boppish 'Blue Honda a la Truck,' the grooving 'Fanfare and Fiesta,' and 'Bud-Like' to increasingly freer music before the spacy closer." He wrote: "Virtually every Hugh Ragin recording is well-worth exploring, and this one is no exception."

The authors of The Penguin Guide to Jazz Recordings called the album an "enjoyable set" and a "nice record," but noted that "Ragin's devotion to the music of Sun Ra... is more implicit than explicit."

== Track listing ==
1. "Blue Honda a la Truck" (Marc Sabatella) – 9:18
2. "Fanfare and Fiesta" (Hugh Ragin) – 6:45
3. "Bud-like" (Marc Sabatella) – 4:06
4. "Song for the Old Country" (Don Pullen) – 8:15
5. "Pictures" (Hugh Ragin) – 11:41
6. "Hugh's Blues" (Hugh Ragin) – 7:24
7. "Goblin Market" (Marc Sabatella) – 8:16
8. "Back to Saturn" (Erik Turkman) – 9:43

== Personnel ==
- Hugh Ragin – trumpet
- Greg Carroll – vibraphone, percussion
- Marc Sabatella – piano
- Erik Turkman – bass
- Scott Gordan – drums
