= The Transitory Poems =

Live album by Vijay Iyer and Craig Taborn
- Released: March 15, 2019
- Recorded: March 12, 2018
- Venues: Franz Liszt Academy of Music; Budapest, Hungary
- Genre: Jazz
- Length: 73:57
- Label: ECM 2644
- Producer: Manfred Eicher

Craig Taborn chronology
Octopus (2018)	The Transitory Poems (2019)	Golden Valley Is Now (2019)

Vijay Iyer chronology
Far from Over (2017)	The Transitory Poems (2018)	Uneasy (2021)

Professional ratings
Review scores
Source	Rating
All About Jazz	5/5 stars
AllMusic	4/5 stars
Financial Times	4/5 stars
Jazz Journal	4.5/5 stars
Jazzwise	3/5 stars
Pitchfork	7.5/10
PopMatters	7/10
Tom Hull	B+

The Transitory Poems is a live album by pianists Vijay Iyer and Craig Taborn recorded at the Franz Liszt Academy of Music in Budapest on March 12, 2018 and released on ECM a year later.

== Background ==
The duo had previously played together in Roscoe Mitchell's Note Factory in 2002 on Song for My Sister. The Transitory Poems consists of eight tracks offered as tributes to formative influences including pianists Cecil Taylor, Muhal Richard Abrams, and Geri Allen, and the painter and sculptor Jack Whitten.

== Reception ==
Dan McClenaghan of All About Jazz stated: "The music's in the air, and then it's gone. The disc's title seems to nod to this sentiment. The music itself does, too. Instant composing, spontaneous arrangements, a gorgeous fluidity of ideas mutating in the moment with an enchanting and lovely spaciousness. And then it's gone, unless somebody records it... The Transitory Poems sounds like two artists colluding in a search for solutions to beautiful mysteries, completely in the moment. That there are no solutions is beside the point. It is the search, the journey that counts."

Matthew Kassel of Pitchfork wrote, "They both operate in what might be described as the avant-garde. But they’re also different musicians. Iyer is mathematical at the keyboard, with a precise, percussive touch, while Taborn, who is more of a figurative thinker, gets by on suggestion and metaphor. His sound is ruminative and spacious... Their styles mesh so well that it can be difficult to distinguish one set of hands from the other, as though a four-armed being had taken a seat at the piano and decided to play for an hour and a quarter."

Simon Adams of Jazz Journal commented, "Throughout, the two pianists mesh their lines almost imperceptibly, dovetailing their rhythms and embellishing melodic details but always giving the other room to breathe. In places, their music can be austere, even daunting, but throughout there is an underlying empathetic warmth and sometimes tenderness. For two quite different stylists to have a produced a set of such unified coherence is a remarkable achievement. Full marks and many stars all round."

== Track listing ==
All tracks are written by Vijay Iyer and Craig Taborn except as noted.

No.	Title	Writer(s)	Length
1.	"Life Line (Seven Tensions)"		13:02
2.	"Sensorium"		4:17
3.	"Kairòs"		8:56
4.	"S.H.A.R.D.S."		9:11
5.	"Shake Down"		6:40
6.	"Clear Monolith"		10:46
7.	"Luminous Brew"		8:17
8.	"Meshwork / Libation / When Kabuya Dances"	Vijay Iyer; Craig Taborn; Geri Allen	12:48
Total length:			63:57

== Charts ==
Chart	Peak position
US Top Jazz Albums (Billboard)	9
