= Chris Lightcap =

American double bassist, bass guitarist and composer

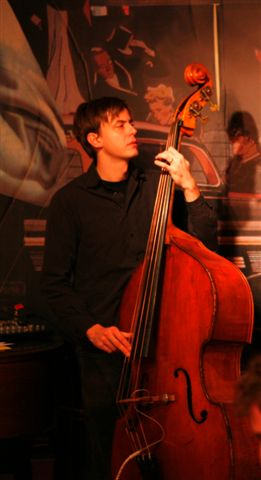

Background information
- Born: Latrobe, Pennsylvania, U.S.
- Genres: Jazz, rock, experimental
- Occupations: Musician, composer
- Instruments: Double bass, bass guitar

Chris Lightcap is an American double bassist, bass guitarist and composer born in Latrobe, Pennsylvania.

== Career ==
In addition to his work as a bassist he has led a variety of bands since 2000 and has produced six albums of original music. Lightcap's first two CDs as a leader, Lay-Up (2000) and Bigmouth (2003) were released on the Fresh Sound New Talent label and featured a quartet line-up with Gerald Cleaver on drums and Tony Malaby and Bill McHenry on tenor saxophones. Two years later he expanded the group to a quintet, naming it Bigmouth and establishing a line-up of Craig Taborn on keyboards, Chris Cheek and Malaby on tenor saxophones and Cleaver on drums. In 2010 Bigmouth recorded Deluxe, Lightcap's third CD as a leader, on Clean Feed Records with alto saxophonist Andrew D'Angelo also joining the group on three selections. The Wall Street Journal called the recording "superb".

In 2006 he received a commission to compose for the ensemble counter)induction, which premiered his piece Wiretap at the Tenri Cultural Center on October 16, 2006. In 2011 he received a New Jazz Works grant from Chamber Music America. Bigmouth premiered Lightcap's resulting work, Lost and Found at the Earshot Jazz Festival on October 28, 2012 in Seattle, WA. The work was subsequently broadcast on NPR for the show Jazzset with Dee Dee Bridgewater. A performance of the piece the following year was reviewed by The New York Times. Bigmouth's 2015 release on Clean Feed Records, Epicenter features this batch of music along with a cover of The Velvet Underground's "All Tomorrow's Parties". 2018 saw the release of his all-electric project Superette on Royal Potato Family which also featured guests Nels Cline and John Medeski. He received a second CMA New Jazz Works grant in 2016, the result of which was SuperBigmouth (which combined his Bigmouth and Superette bands), released on Pyroclastic Records in 2019. Lightcap's albums have appeared on year-end "best of" lists published in The New York Times, NPR, the Village Voice, Jazz Times, and Rolling Stone, among other publications.

Lightcap has worked with Marc Ribot, Regina Carter, Craig Taborn, David Byrne, John Medeski, Tomasz Stanko, John Scofield, The Swell Season, Darius Jones, Mark Turner, Joe Morris, Chris Potter, Glen Hansard, Sheila Jordan, James Carter, Butch Morris, Ben Monder, Ghost Train Orchestra, Tom Harrell, and others.

Lightcap is the cousin of Acetone guitarist Mark Lightcap.

== Selected discography ==
=== As Leader ===
Year released	Title	Label	Notes
2000	Lay-Up	Fresh Sound Records	Quartet, with Tony Malaby (tenor saxophone), Bill McHenry (tenor saxophone), Gerald Cleaver (drums)
2003	Bigmouth	Fresh Sound Records	Quartet, with Tony Malaby (tenor saxophone), Bill McHenry (tenor saxophone), Gerald Cleaver (drums)
2010	Deluxe	Clean Feed Records	Featuring Tony Malaby (tenor saxophone), Chris Cheek (tenor saxophone), Craig Taborn (Wurlitzer, piano), Gerald Cleaver (drums), and guest, Andrew D'Angelo (alto sax)
2015	Epicenter	Clean Feed Records	Featuring Tony Malaby (tenor saxophone), Chris Cheek (tenor saxophone), Craig Taborn (Wurlitzer, piano, organ), Gerald Cleaver (drums)
2018	Superette	Royal Potato Family	Featuring Jonathan Goldberger (electric guitar), Curtis Hasselbring (electric guitar), Dan Rieser (drums), Nels Cline (guest, electric guitar), John Medeski (guest, keyboards)
2019	Superbigmouth	Pyroclastic Records	Featuring Tony Malaby (tenor saxophone), Chris Cheek (tenor saxophone), Craig Taborn (keyboards), Jonathan Goldberger (electric guitar), Curtis Hasselbring (electric guitar), Gerald Cleaver (drums), Dan Rieser (drums)

=== As side musician ===
With Nels Cline

- 2025 Consentrik Quartet (Blue Note Records)

With David Byrne

- 2025 Who Is the Sky? (with Ghost Train Orchestra) (Matador)

With Ghost Train Orchestra and Kronos Quartet

- 2023 Songs and Symphoniques: The Music of Moondog (Cantaloupe Music)

With Darius Jones

- 2024 Legend of E'boi (The Hypervigilant Eye) (AUM Fidelity)

With Regina Carter

- 2003 Paganinni: After a Dream (Verve Records)
- 2010 Reverse Thread (E1)
- 2014 Southern Comfort (Sony)
- 2017 Ella: Accentuate the Positive (Sony)

With Craig Taborn

- 2001 Light Made Lighter (Thirsty Ear)
- 2017 Daylight Ghosts (ECM Records)

With Jon Irabagon

- 2022 Rising Sun (Irabbagast)
- 2024 Recharge the Blade (Irabbagast)
- 2025 Server Farm (Irabbagast)
- 2026 Focus Out (Irabbagast)

With Matt Wilson

- 2008 That's Gonna Leave a Mark (Palmetto Records)
- 2014 Gathering Call (with John Medeski) (Palmetto Records)
- 2016 Beginning of a Memory (Palmetto Records)
- 2020 Hug (Palmetto Records)

With The Swell Season

- 2009 Strict Joy (Anti-)

With Chad Taylor

- 2009 Circle Down (482 Music)

With Gerald Cleaver

- 2008 Detroit (Fresh Sound Records)
- 2019 Live at Firehouse 12 (Sunnyside Records)

With Joe Morris

- 1998 A Cloud of Black Birds (AUM Fidelity)
- 1999 Underthru (Omnitone)
- 2000 At the Old Office (Knitting Factory)
- 2014 Balance (Clean Feed Records)

With Rob Brown

- 1997 Scratching the Surface (CIMP)
- 1998 Jumping Off the Page (No More)
- 2011 Unexplained Phenomena (Marge Records)
- 2019 From Here to Hear (RogueArt)
- 2023 Oblongata (RogueArt)

With Whit Dickey

- 1998 Transonic (AUM Fidelity)
- 2001 Big Top (Wobbly Rail)
- 2005 In a Heartbeat (Clean Feed Records)

With others

- 1997 Vision One, Various Artists (AUM Fidelity)
- 1998 Being and Time, Norman Yamada (Tzadik Records)
- 1998 Longing, Derek Bronston (Hecate)
- 1998 Bab Bab, PLK Trio
- 1999 Standards First, Yoav Polachek (WAMA)
- 1999 With Every Breath, Anthony Coleman (Knitting Factory)
- 2000 Misfit, David Sayers (Dreambox)
- 2000 In Metropolitan Motion, Ben Waltzer (Fresh Sound Records)
- 2003 Another Girl, Yola (Top Shelf)
- 2003 Atrospect Sound, Creative Trans-Informational Alliance
- 2003 Blue Guitar, Mary LaRose (little i)
- 2004 Melodic Workshop, Joe Smith (Fresh Sound Records)
- 2005 Credo, Michael Attias (Clean Feed Records)
- 2006 Shakers-n-Bakers (little i)
- 2006 Memoriaren Mapan, Ruper Ordorika (Elkar)
- 2007 About Time, Claudette Sierra
- 2007 Kairos, David Rogers
- 2007 Green-Wood, James Carney (Songlines)
- 2007 One Summer in Winters, Jeff Alkire
- 2008 YFZ, Shakers-n-Bakers (little i)
- 2008 Ways and Means, James Carney (Songlines)
- 2009 Perennial, Rob Garcia (BJU)
- 2009 Simple, Gabriel Puentes (Fresh Sound Records)
- 2010 Simple Songs For When the World Seems Strange, Jeremy Siskind (BJU)
- 2011 Disney Jazz, Vol. 1: Everybody Wants to Be a Cat, Various Artists (Sony)
- 2011 Mysteries of the Cosmos, Takuya (BNS Records)
- 2012 Bonnie and Clyde (Broadway Records)
- 2012 Attitude, Megumi Hamada (Horipro)
- 2012 Brud, Vols. 1-3, Andre Vida (Pan)
- 2012 Anyscape, Michael Veal (Nektonic)
- 2012 Music Meeting Festival Highlights, Various Artists 2012 (RNW)
- 2012 Quintet (Tristano), Anthony Braxton (Braxton House)
- 2013 Musical Gifts From Joshua Bell and Friends, Joshua Bell (Sony)
- 2013 Reincarnation, Mary LaRose (little i)
- 2014 Plymouth, Saft/Morris/Halvorson/Lightcap/Cleaver (RareNoiseRecords)
- 2014 Afrikan Blues, Miguel Fernandez (SaxOn)
- 2014 Tongue & Groove, Tom Chang (Raw Toast)
- 2014 Venture Bound, Alon Nechushtan (Enja Records)
- 2014 Round Tripper, Lisa Parrott
- 2015 Irwinorange, Lena Hovanesian
- 2015 Up From the Bitterroot, Skye Steele
- 2016 The Wild and Whimsical Worlds Of David Mallamud, David Mallamud (Broadway Records)
- 2018 Heart Love, Shakers-n-Bakers (little i)
- 2020 Vol pour Sidney (retour), Various Artists (Nato)
- 2020 Six of One, David Berkman (Palmetto Records)
- 2020 Enhanced Package, Holistic Butcher (little i)
- 2020 Memento Mori, Jon Dryden
- 2022 Pond Life, Will Bernard (Posi-Tone Records)
- 2022 Trio, Jon Dryden (Secret Sun)
- 2023 Implicatures, Sam Weinberg (Astral Spirits Records)
- 2025 Absent, Stefan Karl Schmid (musichub)
- 2025 Dream Suites Vol. 1, Samo Salamon & Bob Moses (Bandcamp)
- 2026 Light of Day, Michel Gentile (CRW)
- 2026 No One Can Really See, Brian Krock (Toof Records)
- 2026 Some of My Lies Are True, Jon Dryden (Secret Sun)
