= Highsmith (album) =

Studio album by Craig Taborn, Ikue Mori
- Released: May 2017
- Studio: Oktaven Audio, Mount Vernon, New York
- Genre: Jazz
- Length: 48:43
- Label: Tzadik
- Producer: John Zorn

Craig Taborn chronology
Ljubljana (2017)	Highsmith (2017)	Octopus (2018)

Professional ratings
Review scores
Source	Rating
All About Jazz	4/5 stars

Highsmith is an album by Craig Taborn and Ikue Mori. It was released in 2017 by Tzadik Records.

== Background ==
Pianist Craig Taborn and electronics player Ikue Mori first performed as a duo at the Village Vanguard in December 2016. "Taborn, in addition to his status as a top tier jazz pianist, is one of the more dynamic employers of electronics in his music."

== Release and reception ==
Highsmith was released by Tzadik Records in May 2017. An All About Jazz reviewer concluded that the album "takes the electro/acoustic marriage deeper, crafting a unique improvised sound." The Chicago Reader reviewer described the recording as "one of the best recordings" in Mori's career.

== Track listing ==
1. "The Still Point of the Turning World"
2. "Music to Die By"
3. "Two Disagreeable Pigeons"
4. "Nothing That Meets the Eye"
5. "Variations on a Game"
6. "Quiet Night"
7. "A Bird in Hand"
8. "Dangerous Hobby"
9. "Things Had Gone Badly"
10. "Mermaids on the Golf Course"
11. "Trouble with the World"

== Personnel ==
- Craig Taborn – piano
- Ikue Mori – electronics
