= Flaga: Book of Angels Volume 27 =

Studio album by Craig Taborn, Christian McBride and Tyshawn Sorey
- Released: February 2016
- Recorded: November 25, 2015
- Studios: Second Story Sound, New York City
- Genre: Jazz
- Length: 48:57
- Label: Tzadik TZ 8341
- Producer: John Zorn

Craig Taborn chronology
Chants (2013)	Flaga: Book of Angels Volume 27 (2016)	Daylight Ghosts (2017)

Christian McBride chronology
Live at the Village Vanguard (2015)	Flaga: Book of Angels Volume 27 (2016)	Bringin' It (2017)

Flaga: Book of Angels Volume 27 is an album by pianist Craig Taborn, bassist Christian McBride and drummer Tyshawn Sorey which was released in 2016 on John Zorn's Tzadik Records as part of the Zorn's Book of Angels Series.

== Recording and reception ==
Professional ratings
Review scores
Source	Rating
All About Jazz	4.5/5 stars

The album was recorded at Second Story Sound, New York City, on November 25, 2015. All About Jazz stated, "Taborn and his band-mates have—in their immersion on John Zorn's music—crafted a singular trio sound—ruggedly iconoclastic, fresh, fervid, relentlessly off-kilter yet still compellingly melodic, and beautiful, on this splendid recording."

== Track listing ==
All compositions by John Zorn.

1. "Machnia" - 7:59
2. "Peliel" - 4:34
3. "Katzfiel" - 4:18
4. "Talmai" [Take 1] - 4:43
5. "Shoftiel" - 10:41
6. "Agbas" - 4:08
7. "Rogziel" - 2:38
8. "Harbonah" - 4:09
9. "Talmai" [Take 2] - 5:42

== Personnel ==
- Craig Taborn – piano
- Christian McBride – bass
- Tyshawn Sorey – drums
