= Ljubljana (album) =

Live album by Mats Gustafsson and Craig Taborn
- Released: 2017
- Recorded: July 3, 2015
- Venue: Cankerjev Dom, Ljubljana, Slovenia
- Genre: Jazz
- Length: 38:04
- Label: Clean Feed
- Producer: Mats Gustafsson and Craig Taborn

Craig Taborn chronology
Daylight Ghosts (2017)	Ljubljana (2017)	Highsmith (2017)

Ljubljana is an album by saxophonist Mats Gustafsson and pianist Craig Taborn. It was recorded in concert in 2015 and released two years later by Clean Feed Records.

== Recording and music ==
The album was recorded in concert at Cankerjev Dom, Ljubljana, as part of the Ljubljana Jazz Festival, on July 3, 2015. The two tracks, improvised, were credited to the two musicians. On the first track, "The Eyes Moving. Slowly.", Gustafsson employs slap-tonguing and vocalizations. "The Ears Facing The Fantasies. Again.", the second track, builds as "Taborn's percussive left hand churns the improvisation as he brings the piece to a boil, pressing Gustafsson to push his accelerator", then has a quieter section.

== Release ==
Ljubljana was released by Clean Feed Records in 2017. They released it as an LP and as a digital download.

== Reception ==
Professional ratings
Review scores
Source	Rating
All About Jazz	4.5/5 stars
The Free Jazz Collective	4.5/5 stars

In a review for All About Jazz, Mark Corroto wrote: "Congratulations to whomever conceived of this pairing of two improvised music giants... Pairing these seemingly disparate instruments and performers yields an amazing cooperation... The wow factor is quite high for this performance."

Martin Selkelsky of The Free Jazz Collective included the album in his list of 2017's top 10 releases. FJC reviewer Eyal Hareuveni described the album as "a meeting where some mean blows and kicks were exchanged," and "a muscular wrestling of heavy-weight champions of spontaneous improvisations, both as serious as their lives." He noted that both musicians "correspond immediately to each other's gestures," while at the same time "neither Gustafsson or Taborn feel any need to compromise or blur their distinct, strong-minded personalities."

The Downtown Music Gallery's Bruce Lee Gallanter commented: "in what concerns improvisation, if the protagonists are committed explorers of spontaneity anything can happen, even the most extraordinary music... these two fantastic improvisers created music with their differences, entering each other's territory. Who said art is a question of compromise? It isn't. This may well be the jazz album of the year and a landmark on the label."

Writing for Stereogum, Phil Freeman stated that while Gustafsson "pops the valves... screeches, [and] bellows from the very bottom of the horn's range," Taborn, "no matter how much he's playing, always comes across unperturbed." He remarked: "The two of them rarely seem to lock in — they're playing simultaneously, rather than together, but the results are still exciting."

== Track listing ==
1. "The Eyes Moving. Slowly." – 20:24
2. "The Ears Facing the Fantasies. Again." – 17:40

== Personnel ==
- Mats Gustafsson – slide saxophone, baritone saxophone
- Craig Taborn – piano
