= Underthru =

Studio album by Joe Morris
- Released: 1999
- Recorded: March 18, 1999
- Studio: PBS Studios, Westwood, Massachusetts
- Genre: Jazz
- Length: 63:43
- Label: Omnitone
- Producer: Joe Morris

Joe Morris chronology
Many Rings (1999)	Underthru (1999)	Soul Search (2000)

Underthru is an album by American jazz guitarist Joe Morris which was recorded in 1999 and released on OmniTone. In addition to Morris, the quartet for this album features violinist Mat Maneri, bassist Chris Lightcap and drummer Gerald Cleaver.

== Reception ==
Professional ratings
Review scores
Source	Rating
AllMusic	3/5 stars
The Penguin Guide to Jazz	3/4 stars

In his review for AllMusic, Michael G. Nastos states "Though short of Sonny Sharrock energy-wise and Derek Bailey in terms of innovation, Morris nonetheless holds high qualities of inventiveness, singular purpose, and individual vision."

The All About Jazz review by Glenn Astarita claims "In some respects, Underthru is a bit lighter or perhaps less penetrating than previous 'Quartet' outings yet offers another glimpse of a notoriously 'cutting edge' band who seem capable of pursuing just about any avenue imaginable."

In his review for JazzTimes Larry Appelbaum says about the album that "it is the most overtly jazz-based recording in the Morris catalog... Underthru swings and grooves and leaves a lot of space for interaction."

== Track listing ==
All compositions by Joe Morris

1. "Underthru" – 16:24
2. "Remarks" – 14:27
3. "Routine Three" – 10:18
4. "Two Busses and a Long Walk" – 14:14
5. "Manipulatives" – 8:20

== Personnel ==
- Joe Morris - guitar
- Mat Maneri – violin, baritone violin
- Chris Lightcap – bass
- Gerald Cleaver – drums
