= Octopus (Kris Davis and Craig Taborn album) =

Live album by Kris Davis and Craig Taborn
- Released: 26 January 2018
- Recorded: 2016
- Venue: University of Michigan; Wexner Center for the Arts; University of California, San Diego
- Genre: Jazz
- Length: 58:38
- Label: Pyroclastic
- Producer: David Breskin

Craig Taborn chronology
Highsmith (2017)	Octopus (2018)	The Transitory Poems (2019)

Professional ratings
Review scores
Source	Rating
All About Jazz	4/5 stars
Audiophile Audition	4/5 stars
Financial Times	4/5 stars
Jazzwise	4/5 stars

Octopus is a live album by jazz pianists Kris Davis and Craig Taborn. The album was recorded in 2016 and released on 26 January 2018 by Pyroclastic Records.

== Background ==
Octopus is a collection of six compositions taken form three live recordings. The album is based on Davis’s 2016 release Duopoly where she played several duos with clarinetist Don Byron, guitarist Bill Frisell, drummer Marcus Gilmore—one part was with Taborn. In the liner notes for Octopus, Davis explains: "From the moment we started playing I felt instantly transported and free within the music, and had the sense we could go anywhere... There was a feeling of deep listening, a dynamic sense of push and pull, and yet it strangely felt like a conversation we’d been having for years".

== Reception ==
Michael J. Agovino of Village Voice commented "...no two pianists have played with the kind of freedom and grace, abandon and emotion as Kris Davis and Craig Taborn on their new album, Octopus... You can rack your brain at times figuring out which pianist is which—on this song and throughout the set—but, well, you needn’t. It’s an intellectual exercise, true; it’s also, simply, beautiful music". Mac Randall of JazzTimes wrote "An oceangoing organism with one brain and eight independent neuron-bearing limbs is the perfect image to invoke for a rather intense collection of piano duets". Alison Bentley of London Jazz News stated "Kris Davis and Craig Taborn on this new album of piano duets sound as if they’re playing with at least eight arms and probably a few legs too, such is the virtuosity and intensity of their playing. The six tracks on this intriguing CD are drawn from three live gigs, melding free jazz, blues and modern classical music". Doug Simpson of Audiophile Audition added "The performances, which run in length from seven minutes to nearly 15 minutes, incorporate pre-composed material; wholly improvised sections; and two carefully chosen cover tunes. Taborn and Davis’ conversant style is parallel to the free jazz of likeminded pianists such as Cecil Taylor, Don Pullen or Paul Bley". In his review for Financial Times, Mike Hobart commented, "There are times when the criss-crossing lines and rumbling full-piano chords captured on this dazzling live piano duet do indeed conjure a single creature with many arms. Even when playing at full stretch, pianists Kris Davis and Craig Taborn deliver the control and sense of purpose of a single intelligence."

Rolling Stone included the release in its 20 Best Jazz Albums of 2018 list, ranking it #18.

== Track listing ==
No.	Title	Writer(s)	Length
1.	"Interruptions One"	Taborn	10:54
2.	"Ossining"	Davis	8:02
3.	"Chatterbox"	Davis	10:05
4.	"Sing Me Softly of the Blues / Interruptions Two"	Taborn, Carla Bley	14:36
5.	"Interruptions Three"	Taborn	7:15
6.	"Love in Outer Space"	Sun Ra	7:47
Total length:			58:38
