= Gerald Cleaver =

American drummer

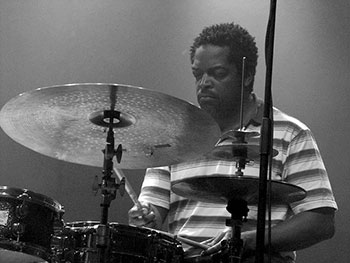

Background information
- Born: May 4, 1963 (age 63); Detroit, Michigan
- Genres: Jazz
- Occupation: Musician
- Instrument: Drums

Gerald Cleaver (born May 4, 1963) is a jazz drummer from Detroit, Michigan.

== Early life ==
Cleaver's father is drummer John Cleaver Jr., originally from Springfield, Ohio, and his mother was from Greenwood, Mississippi. Gerald had six older siblings.

== Career ==
Cleaver joined the jazz faculty at the University of Michigan in 1995. He has performed or recorded with Joe Morris, Mat Maneri, Roscoe Mitchell, Miroslav Vitouš, Michael Formanek, Tomasz Stańko, Franck Amsallem and others.

Under the name Veil of Names, Cleaver released an album called Adjust on the Fresh Sound New Talent label in 2001. It featured Maneri, Ben Monder, Andrew Bishop, Craig Taborn and Reid Anderson and was a Best Debut Recording Nominee by the Jazz Journalists Association.

Cleaver currently leads the groups Uncle June, Black Host, Violet Hour and NiMbNl as well as working as a sideman with many different artists.

== Discography ==
An asterisk (*) indicates that the year is that of release.

=== As leader/co-leader ===
Year recorded	Title	Label	Notes
2000	Adjust	Fresh Sound	Sextet, with Andrew Bishop (clarinet, soprano sax, tenor sax), Mat Maneri (violin), Craig Taborn (piano), Ben Monder (guitar), Reid Anderson (electric bass, acoustic bass)
2007	Gerald Cleaver's Detroit	Fresh Sound	Sextet, with Ben Waltzer (piano), Andrew Bishop (soprano saxophone, bass clarinet, tenor saxophone), J. D. Allen (tenor saxophone), Jeremy Pelt (trumpet), Chris Lightcap (bass)
2008	Farmers by Nature	AUM Fidelity	As the band "Farmers by Nature," with Craig Taborn (piano), William Parker (bass)
2009	Be It as I See It	Fresh Sound	Sextet, with Craig Taborn (piano), Andrew Bishop (flue, soprano and bass clarinet, soprano and tenor saxophone), Tony Malaby (tenor saxophone, soprano saxophone), Mat Maneri (viola), Drew Gress (bass)
2010	Out of This World's Distortions	AUM Fidelity	As the band "Farmers by Nature," with Craig Taborn (piano), William Parker (bass)
2010	Tivoli Trio	Red Piano Records	As the band "Tivoli Trio," with Frank Calberg (piano), John Hebert (bass)
2011	Love and Ghosts	AUM Fidelity	As the band "Farmers by Nature," with Craig Taborn (piano), William Parker (bass); in concert
2013*	Life in the Sugar Candle Mines	Northern Spy	Quintet, As the band "Black Host," with Darius Jones (alto sax), Brandon Seabrook (guitar), Cooper-Moore (piano), Pascal Niggenkemper (bass)
2016*	Our Earth / Our World	pfMENTUM	Leaderless quartet, with Peter Kuhn and Dave Sewelson (reeds) and Larry Roland (bass)
2016*	An Air of Unreality	RogueArt	As the band "Judson Trio," with Joëlle Léandre (bass) and Mat Maneri (viola)
2016*	Ida Lupino	ECM	Leaderless quartet, with Giovanni Guidi (piano), Gianluca Petrella (trombone), and Louis Sclavis (clarinet)
2018*	The Industry of Entropy	Relative Pitch Records	Leaderless quartet, with Brandon Lopez (bass), Andria Nicodemou (vibraphone), Matt Nelson (tenor saxophone)
2018*	Songs of the Wild Cave	RogueArt	duo with Larry Ochs (tenor and sopranino saxophones)
2019*	What Is to Be Done	Clean Feed Records	Leaderless trio, with Nels Cline (guitar), Larry Ochs (tenor and sopranino saxophones)
2019*	Live at Firehouse 12	Sunnyside Records	As "Gerald Cleaver & Violet Hour" with J.D. Allen (tenor saxophone), Andrew Bishop (bass clarinet, soprano & tenor saxophone), Jeremy Pelt (trumpet), Ben Waltzer (piano), Chris Lightcap (bass)
2020*	Signs	577 Records	Solo electronic album
2020*	Welcome Adventure! Vol. 1	577 Records	Leaderless quartet, with Daniel Carter (tenor saxophone, trumpet, flute), Matthew Shipp (piano), William Parker (bass)
2021*	Griots	Positive Elevation Records	Solo electronic album
2023*	22/23	Positive Elevation Records	Solo electronic album
2024*	The Process	Positive Elevation Records	Solo electronic album

=== As sideman ===
With Lotte Anker

- Triptych (Leo, 2005)
- Live at the Loft (ILK, 2009)
- Floating Islands (ILK, 2009)

With Samuel Blaser

- 7th Heaven (Between the Lines, 2008)
- Boundless (Hatology, 2011) with Marc Ducret
- As the Sea (Hatology, 2012) with Marc Ducret
- Spring Rain (Whirlwind, 2015)

With Ellery Eskelin

- Trio Willisau Live (HatOLOGY 2016)
- Trio New York II (Prime source 2013)
- Trio New York (Prime source 2011)

With Chris Lightcap

- Lay-up (Fresh Sound, 2000)
- Bigmouth(Fresh Sound, 2003)
- Deluxe (Clean Feed, 2010)
- Epicenter (Clean Feed, 2015)
- SuperBigmouth (Pyroclastic, 2019)

With Roscoe Mitchell

- The Day and the Night (Dizim, 1997)
- Nine to Get Ready (ECM, 1999)
- Song for My Sister (Pi, 2002)

With Joe Morris

- Underthru (OmniTone, 1999)
- At the Old Office (Knitting Factory, 2000)
- Altitude (AUM Fidelity, 2012)
- Balance (Clean Feed, 2014)

With Ivo Perelman

- Family Ties (Leo, 2012) with Joe Morris
- The Living Jelly (Leo, 2012) with Joe Morris
- The Foreign Legion (Leo, 2012) with Matthew Shipp
- Enigma (Leo, 2013) with Matthew Shipp and Whit Dickey
- Serendipity (Leo, 2013) with Matthew Shipp and William Parker
- The Art of The Improv Trio Volume 1 (Leo, 2016) with Karl Berger
- The Art of The Improv Trio Volume 3 (Leo, 2016) with Matthew Shipp
- The Art of The Improv Trio Volume 4 (Leo, 2016) with William Parker
- The Art of The Improv Trio Volume 5 (Leo, 2016) with Joe Morris
- The Art of The Improv Trio Volume 6 (Leo, 2016) with Joe Morris
- Breaking Point (Leo, 2016) with Mat Maneri and Joe Morris
- Octagon (Leo, 2017) with Brandon Lopez and Nate Wooley

With Matthew Shipp

- Pastoral Composure (Thirsty Ear, 2000)
- New Orbit (Thirsty Ear, 2001)
- The Blue Series Continuum – Sorcerer Sessions (Thirsty Ear, 2003)
- Equilibrium (Thirsty Ear, 2003)
- Harmony and Abyss (Thirsty Ear, 2004)
- Our Lady of the Flowers (RogueArt, 2015)

With Miroslav Vitous

- Universal Syncopations II (ECM, 2007)
- Remembering Weather Report (ECM, 2009)
- Music of Weather Report (ECM, 2016)

With others

- Joshua Abrams' Cloud Script, Cloud Script (Rogueart, 2020)
- Andrew Bishop, Time & Imaginary Time (Envoi, 2006)
- Rob Brown, Crown Trunk Root Funk (AUM Fidelity, 2008)
- Rob Brown, Unexplained Phenomena (Marge, 2011)
- Taylor Ho Bynum, Book of Three (RogueArt, 2010)
- Taylor Ho Bynum, Book of Three – Continuum (Relative Pitch, 2013)
- Benoit Delbecq, Spots on Stripes (Clean Feed, 2018)
- Yelena Eckemoff, In the Shadow of a Cloud (L&H, 2017)
- Liberty Ellman, Ophiuchus Butterfly (Pi, 2006)
- Michael Formanek, The Rub and Spare Change (ECM, 2010) with Tim Berne & Craig Taborn
- Michael Formanek, Small Places (ECM, 2012) with Tim Berne & Craig Taborn
- Charles Gayle, Precious Soul (FMP, 2001)
- Charles Gayle, Shout! (Clean Feed, 2005)
- Daniel Guggenheim, Traces of... (Laika, 2005)
- Frank London, Hazonos (Tzadik, 2005)
- Mat Maneri, Blue Decco (Thirsty Ear, 2000)
- Mat Maneri, Sustain (Thirsty Ear, 2002) with Joe McPhee
- Jemeel Moondoc, Live at the Vision Festival (Ayler, 2003)
- Angelika Niescier, New York Trio (Intakt, 2019)
- Fredrik Nordstrom, Gentle Fire, Restless Dreams (Moserobie, 2016)
- Eivind Opsvik, Overseas (Fresh Sound, 2002)
- William Parker, Double Sunrise Over Neptune (AUM Fidelity, 2007)
- William Parker, Uncle Joe's Spirit House (Centering, 2010)
- Mario Pavone, Orange (Playscape, 2003)
- Mario Pavone, Ancestors (Playscape, 2008)
- Jeremy Pelt, November (MAXJAZZ, 2008)
- Jeremy Pelt, Men of Honor (HighNote, 2010)
- Jeremy Pelt, The Talented Mr. Pelt (HighNote, 2011)
- Jeremy Pelt, Soul (HighNote, 2012)
- Eric Revis, Crowded Solitudes (Clean Feed, 2016)
- Samo Salamon, Government Cheese (Fresh Sound New Talent, 2006)
- Samo Salamon, Stretching Out (Samo Records, 2012)
- Wadada Leo Smith, Lake Biwa (Tzadik, 2004)
- Tomasz Stanko, Wislawa (ECM, 2013)
- Tomasz Stanko, December Avenue (ECM, 2017)
- Steve Swell, Soul Travelers (Roguert, 2016)
- Adam Rogers and Dave Binney, R&B (Criss Cross, 2015)
- Craig Taborn, Light Made Lighter (Thirsty Ear, 2001)
- Craig Taborn, Chants (ECM, 2013)
- Gebhard Ullmann, Hat and Shoes (Between the Lines, 2015)
- Rodney Whitaker, Hidden Kingdom (DIW, 1997)
