= JC on the Set =

Studio album by James Carter
- Released: 1994
- Recorded: April 14 & 15 1993
- Studios: Sound on Sound, New York City
- Genre: Jazz
- Length: 65:09
- Labels: DIW; DIW 875
- Producer: Kazunori Sugiyama

James Carter chronology
JC on the Set (1994)	Jurassic Classics (1995)

JC on the Set is the debut album by saxophonist James Carter, recorded in 1993 and released on the Japanese DIW label. It was released by Columbia Records in the United States. The album was produced by Kazunori Sugiyama.

== Reception ==
Professional ratings
Review scores
Source	Rating
AllMusic	4.5/5 stars
MusicHound Jazz: The Essential Album Guide	5/5 stars
The Penguin Guide to Jazz Recordings	3.5/4 stars
Rolling Stone	4/5 stars
The Rolling Stone Album Guide	4/5 stars

The Chicago Tribune wrote that "Carter draws on bebop, R&B and avant-garde techniques to make a statement; considering his generous use of rasping tone, top-range harmonics, guttural growls and the like, he certainly makes an impression." Rolling Stone noted that "Carter has a conspicuous gift for the entire post-Coltrane jazz vocabulary and a genuine affection for pre-Charlie Parker saxophone techniques, too." USA Today listed JC on the Set as the 10th best jazz album of 1994; the Pittsburgh Post-Gazette listed it as the fourth best.

The AllMusic review by Scott Yanow stated: "Twenty-five at the time of this CD, James Carter had already absorbed much of the tradition... He also shows that he has the courage to play completely outside whenever it seems logical to him... Carter puts on quite a tour-de-force throughout this very impressive set." The Penguin Guide to Jazz Recordings said that the album "delivered in trumps."

== Track listing ==
All compositions by James Carter except as indicated

1. "JC on the Set" - 6:27
2. "Baby Girl Blues" - 7:49
3. "Worried and Blue" (Don Byas) - 8:07
4. "Blues for a Nomadic Princess" - 13:53
5. "Caravan" (Duke Ellington, Irving Mills, Juan Tizol) - 9:44
6. "Hour of Parting" (Mischa Spoliansky, incorrectly credited to Sun Ra) - 8:20
7. "Lunatic" (John Hardee) - 4:20
8. "Sophisticated Lady" (Ellington, Mills, Mitchell Parish) - 6:41

== Personnel ==
- James Carter – tenor saxophone, alto saxophone, baritone saxophone
- Craig Taborn – piano
- Jaribu Shahid – bass
- Tani Tabbal – drums
