= Light Made Lighter =

Studio album by Craig Taborn
- Released: 2001
- Recorded: October 2001
- Studio: The Studio, New York City
- Genre: Jazz
- Length: 40:34
- Label: Thirsty Ear
- Producer: Matthew Shipp

Craig Taborn chronology
Craig Taborn Trio (1994)	Light Made Lighter (2001)	Junk Magic (2004)

Light Made Lighter is the second album by American jazz pianist Craig Taborn, which was released in 2001 on Thirsty Ear's Blue Series.

== Recording and reception ==
Professional ratings
Review scores
Source	Rating
AllMusic	4.5/5 stars
The Penguin Guide to Jazz	3/4 stars

The album was recorded in October 2001.

In his review for AllMusic, Thom Jurek states "This is one of the best records in Thirsty Ear's 'Blue' series thus far, and, more importantly, it reveals to American audiences what a monster Taborn really is as a pianist." The Penguin Guide to Jazz says "There are hints of nursery rhyme and calipso on the opening track which suggest a certain personal resonance, and which inevitably recalls some of Andrew Hill's Caribbean stuff, but elsewhere the tone is more sombre."

== Track listing ==
All compositions by Craig Taborn except as indicated

1. "Bodies We Came Out Of" – 4:57
2. "St. Ride" – 2:03
3. "I Cover the Waterfront" (Johnny Green) – 3:09
4. "Crocodile" – 6:44
5. "Light Made Lighter" – 5:24
6. "Whiskey Warm" – 2:57
7. "Morning Creatures" – 2:26
8. "St. Ranglehold" – 2:56
9. "American Landscape" – 4:22
10. "Light Made Lighter - Piano" – 1:57
11. "Bodies We Came Out Of - Part two" – 3:39

== Personnel ==
- Craig Taborn – piano
- Chris Lightcap – bass
- Gerald Cleaver - drums
