= Chants (album) =

Studio album by Craig Taborn
- Released: April 23, 2013
- Recorded: June 2012
- Studio: Avatar (New York, New York)
- Genre: Jazz
- Length: 64:53
- Label: ECM 2326
- Producer: Manfred Eicher

Craig Taborn chronology
Avenging Angel (2011)	Chants (2013)	Flaga: Book of Angels Volume 27 (2016)

Professional ratings
Review scores
Source	Rating
AllAboutJazz	5/5 stars
Allmusic	4/5 stars
Down Beat	4.5/5 stars
Financial Times	4/5 stars
Tom Hull	B+

Chants is an album by the Craig Taborn Trio recorded in New York in June 2012 and released on ECM April the following year. The trio features Taborn on piano with rhythm section Thomas Morgan and Gerald Cleaver.

== Reception ==
The AllMusic review by Thom Jurek awarded the album four stars, stating "Chants is a strong statement from Taborn both as a composer and bandleader, but it's also a dialogue on the trio format itself, as articulated by this vastly talented, thought-provoking group."

The Financial Times also gave it four stars out of five, describing it as "exuberant trio music with an exceptional group dynamic".

All About Jazz critic John Kelman praised the album, writing, "Chants is an album that augments the label's already vast collection of piano trio recordings with an unmistakably personal album whose hidden beauty unveils itself further with each and every listen."

Down Beat awarded it 4.5 stars, stating that the album "is original to its core".

The album was also nominated for "Record of the Year" 2014 by the Jazz Journalists Association (but lost to Wayne Shorter's Without a Net).

== Track listing ==
All compositions by Craig Taborn.

1. "Saints" – 5:22
2. "Beat the Ground" – 4:03
3. "In Chant" – 8:21
4. "Hot Blood" – 3:52
5. "All True Night/Future Perfect" – 12:46
6. "Cracking Hearts" – 7:08
7. "Silver Ghosts" – 7:36
8. "Silver Days or Love" – 8:24
9. "Speak the Name" – 6:57

== Personnel ==
=== Craig Taborn Trio ===
- Craig Taborn – piano
- Thomas Morgan – bass
- Gerald Cleaver – drums

== Charts ==
Chart	Peak position (2013)
US Top Jazz Albums (Billboard)	12
