= Avenging Angel (album) =

Studio album by Craig Taborn
- Released: May 13, 2011
- Recorded: July 2010
- Studio: Auditorio Radiotelevisione Svizzera, Lugano, Switzerland
- Genre: Jazz
- Length: 67:01
- Label: ECM; ECM 2207
- Producer: Manfred Eicher

Craig Taborn chronology
Junk Magic (2004)	Avenging Angel (2011)	Chants (2013)

Professional ratings
Review scores
Source	Rating
AllAboutJazz	5/5 stars
AllMusic	4/5 stars
FreeJazzBlog	4.5/5 stars
The Guardian	4/5 stars
Pop Matters	8/10 stars
Tom Hull	B+

Avenging Angel is a solo piano album by American jazz pianist and composer Craig Taborn recorded in July 2010 and released on the ECM label.

== Background ==
Taborn had been speaking to producer Manfred Eicher about recording his trio, but coordinating the schedules of everyone required was proving difficult. A week after Taborn had completed a solo piano tour of Europe, Eicher suggested that he record a solo album; Taborn "was ready at that point: shedding for hours a day, just practicing and playing exercises to prepare". For a week before the recording, he had been teaching children jazz in Switzerland; then, after a solo concert, Taborn remembers, "I was driven to Lugano, arriving at like 2 a.m. I was tired the next day going into the studio". Once there, he was determined to record something individual, instead of sounding similar to other solo jazz piano projects.

== Recording and music ==
The album was recorded in a Radiotelevisione svizzera studio in Lugano, Switzerland. The piano was a Steinway concert grand model D. Asked how much of the album was improvised, Taborn replied that, "I would say 90 percent. A couple of the more rhythmic, long-cycle things were preconceptualized." Although two days were available in which to record, a total of 33 or 34 pieces for possible inclusion were recorded on the first day, and on the second Taborn told producer Manfred Eicher, "I think we're good, let's just start listening." The only pre-existing composition on the album is "Over the Water", which featured on Taborn's first album as leader, Craig Taborn Trio.

Taborn's comment on solo piano performance, including for this album, was that "I'm really listening intensely to these very subtle nuances of the sound in the piano. I'm even hearing the three different strings on each note, how they resonate and how the beats work. I wanted to find a way to document that, which can be tricky."

"The Broad Day King" features an ostinato with single-note phrases under it and much sustain and space between ideas. "Glossolalia" is more aggressive: rapid three-octave runs and bass poundings are used. In "This Voice Says So", he plays just 20 notes in the opening minute, including a three-note phrase that is repeated six times. In "Gift Horse/Over the Water", Taborn uses right-hand chords played in different places within each repetition of the ten notes that are used in each unit of two bars.

== Reception ==
The Los Angeles Times hailed the uniqueness of the record as "unlike any other of its kind. Often hushed and spacious where many musicians will opt for a maximalist approach, Avenging Angel specializes in building a contemplative atmosphere all its own." The AllMusic review by Thom Jurek awarded the album 4 stars, stating "Avenging Angel is not an intellectual exercise, it is a major contribution to the actual language of the piano as an improvisational instrument: its 13 pieces feel like a suite: seamless, economical, original, and visionary."

Slate jazz critic Seth Colter Walls nominated the album as a new classic, writing, "Avenging Angel doesn't just seem like an 'album of the year' candidate, but something destined to have one of those 'crown' icons next to its four-star rating in the 30th Penguin Guide to Jazz, however many years from now." The album was placed 30th in Down Beat's Critics Poll jazz album of the year list in 2012. In 2012 the album was also nominated by the Jazz Journalists Association for their award Record of the Year. In 2017, The New York Times' Adam Shatz commented that "'Avenging Angel' is now seen as a benchmark of solo jazz piano".

== Track listing ==
All compositions by Craig Taborn

1. "The Broad Day King" – 6:16
2. "Glossolalia" – 2:44
3. "Diamond Turning Dream" – 4:17
4. "Avenging Angel" – 6:56
5. "This Voice Says So" – 9:43
6. "Neverland" – 4:28
7. "True Life Near" – 4:29
8. "Gift Horse/Over the Water" – 7:37
9. "A Difficult Thing Said Simply" – 4:35
10. "Spirit Hard Knock" – 4:37
11. "Neither-Nor" – 3:18
12. "Forgetful" – 7:58
13. "This Is How You Disappear" – 5:03

== Personnel ==
- Craig Taborn – piano
