= Tareq Abboushi =

Palestinian-American musician and composer

Tareq Abboushi طارق عبوشي
- Education: William Paterson University
- Occupations: Musician and composer

Tareq Abboushi is a Palestinian-American musician and composer who has spent time living and performing in both New York City and Ramallah.

His first instrument was the piano on which he practised western classical music before transitioning to jazz. He then studied for a B.M. in Jazz Piano from William Paterson University, during which time he also began playing the traditional Palestinian buzuq, a long-necked lute. His buzuq playing is influenced by his jazz sensibilities in its form of rhythms and phrasing.

Abboushi plays with many groups in the New York area and is the leader and composer of the Arabic/Jazz fusion quintet SHUSMO, which released its debut album One in 2005, and second album "Mumtastic" in 2011. He has also lectured on Arabic music at Columbia University, New York University, Juilliard School of Music, and the Museum of the City of New York.

In 2000, Tarek Aboushi founded a band in New York City, USA, called "Shou Isma." Tarek Aboushi has also released four albums in collaboration with Dan Zenz and composed the soundtracks for several films and artistic works, most notably "Meeting Point," "Chicken Head," which won the Best Short Film Award at the 2010 Dubai Film Festival, and "Rashi's Marriage," which was nominated for an Academy Award.
