= Craig Taborn Trio =

Studio album by Craig Taborn
- Released: 1994
- Recorded: April 18 & 19, 1994
- Studio: Power Station, New York City
- Genre: Jazz
- Length: 55:45
- Label: DIW
- Producer: Kazunori Sugiyama

Craig Taborn chronology
Craig Taborn Trio (1994)	Light Made Lighter (2001)

Craig Taborn Trio is the debut album by American jazz pianist Craig Taborn. It was recorded in 1994 and released on the Japanese DIW label.

== Background ==
After completing Jurassic Classics with the James Carter Quartet, Taborn appropriated unused studio time to record this album with bandmates bassist Jaribu Shahid and drummer Tani Tabbal: "We three rehearsed for a couple hours before the hit and recorded for two days. I picked tunes that weren't too difficult yet were valid and representative of my stuff". Taborn wrote several of these songs for a straightahead, neo-bop style, and covered under-recorded compositions such as Ornette Coleman's "Compassion", Horace Silver's "Shirl" and John Coltrane's Paul Chambers featured "Bass Blues".

== Reception ==
Professional ratings
Review scores
Source	Rating
AllMusic	4/5 stars
Down Beat	4/5 stars
The Penguin Guide to Jazz Recordings	3/4 stars

In his review for AllMusic, Ken Dryden says that the album "showcases the talented pianist in a variety of settings ranging from post-bop and hard bop to free jazz and avant-garde jazz."

In a combined review with two James Carter's albums for Down Beat, Jon Andrews notes that "Taborn has the same omnivorous esthetic as Carter, assimilating contemporary piano styles as diverse as Keith Jarrett and Cecil Taylor."

== Track listing ==
All compositions by Craig Taborn except as indicated

1. "David the Goliath" – 4:01
2. "Compassion" (Ornette Coleman) – 7:02
3. "Scar" (Andrew Dahlke) – 6:07
4. "A Man of Action" – 5:27
5. "Shirl" (Horace Silver) – 5:27
6. "Over the Water" – 5:45
7. "The Temple" – 4:20
8. "Bass Blues" (John Coltrane) – 5:34
9. "The Soul of Grace" – 6:31
10. "Uproot" – 5:31

== Personnel ==
- Craig Taborn – piano
- Jaribu Shahid – bass
- Tani Tabbal – drums
