= Junk Magic =

Studio album by Craig Taborn
- Released: April 20, 2004
- Studio: Brooklyn Recording, Brooklyn, NY; Integral, Minneapolis, MN
- Genre: Jazz
- Length: 41:58
- Label: Thirsty Ear
- Producer: Craig Taborn

Craig Taborn chronology
Light Made Lighter (2001)	Junk Magic (2004)	Avenging Angel (2011)

Professional ratings
Review scores
Source	Rating
AllMusic	4.5/5 stars
The Penguin Guide to Jazz	4/4 stars
Tom Hull	B

Junk Magic is an album by Craig Taborn, with Aaron Stewart (tenor sax), Mat Maneri (viola), and Dave King (drums). It was released in 2004 by Thirsty Ear Recordings.

== Background ==
The album's title was also the name of the band, which was formed to be Taborn's electronic group, allowing him to explore the interactions of composition, improvisation and electronics. The name came from Sam Shepard's writings.

== Recording and music ==
Taborn produced the album. Texture and pulse were important contributors to the overall sound. The title track contains "skittering beats [...that] layer themselves over off-kilter drum machine pyrotechnics and a looped piano phrase."

== Releases ==
Junk Magic was released on April 20, 2004 by Thirsty Ear Recordings.

== Reception ==
The Penguin Guide to Jazz commented that the album's title "is apposite, since it does resemble something beautiful and even something slightly forbidding created out of the remnants of a throwaway culture". The AllMusic reviewer concluded that "Junk Magic is a stunner from start to finish, and one that challenges the notions and linguistic senses as to what jazz 'is', as well as what it is not." Nate Chinen praised Taborn's work as producer, stating that "What pushes this album into the zone of innovation is his work as a sequencer and producer, which gives the lie to any accusation that 'jazztronica' means jazz musicians superimposing their tunes on synthetic grooves. What Taborn does is infallibly organic, even when he's performing radical reconstructive surgery."

== Track listing ==
All compositions are by Craig Taborn.

1. "Junk Magic" – 6:18
2. "Mystero" – 6:55
3. "Shining Through" – 5:50
4. "Prismatica" – 3:32
5. "Bodies at Rest and in Motion" – 7:07
6. "Stalagmite" – 1:09
7. "The Golden Age" – 11:07

== Personnel ==
- Craig Taborn – piano, keyboards, programming
- Aaron Stewart – tenor sax
- Mat Maneri – viola
- Dave King – drums
