= Craig Taborn =

American keyboardist and composer (born 1970)

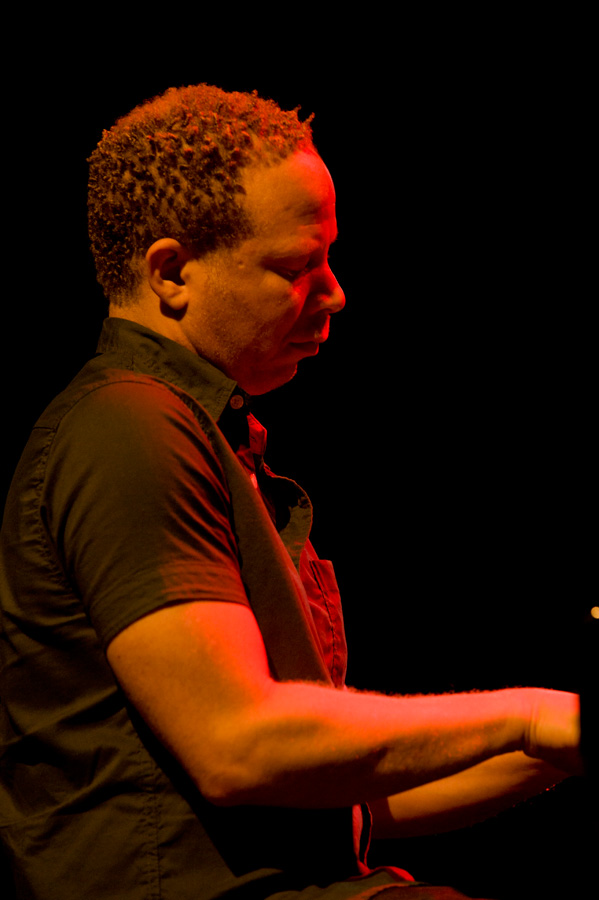
- Taborn at the Moers Festival, 2012

Background information
- Born: Craig Marvin Taborn; February 20, 1970 (age 56); Minneapolis, Minnesota, U.S.
- Genre: Jazz
- Occupations: Musician, composer
- Instruments: Piano, keyboards, organ, electronics
- Years active: Late 1980s–present
- Labels: DIW, Thirsty Ear, ECM
- Website: www.craigtaborn.com

Craig Marvin Taborn (/ˈteɪˌbɔːrn/; born February 20, 1970) is an American pianist, organist, keyboardist and composer. He works solo and in bands, mostly playing various forms of jazz. He started playing piano and Moog synthesizer as an adolescent and was influenced at an early stage by a wide range of music, including by the freedom expressed in recordings of free jazz and contemporary classical music.

While at university, Taborn toured and recorded with jazz saxophonist James Carter. Taborn went on to play with numerous other musicians in electronic and acoustic settings, while also building a reputation as a solo pianist. He has a range of styles, and often adapts his playing to the nature of the instrument and the sounds that he can make it produce. His improvising, particularly for solo piano, often adopts a modular approach, in which he begins with small units of melody and rhythm and then develops them into larger forms and structures.

In 2011, Down Beat magazine chose Taborn as winner of the electric keyboard category, as well as rising star in both the piano and organ categories. By the end of 2020, Taborn had appeared on 14 albums as a leader or co-leader and more than 100 as a sideman.

== Early life ==
Taborn was born in Minneapolis, Minnesota, to John, a psychologist, and Marjorie, a social worker. His father was a department chair at the University of Minnesota and his mother worked for Minneapolis public schools. Taborn's older brother, John Gregory, became a psychologist. They grew up in Golden Valley, Minnesota, where Craig Taborn attended Breck School. His parents gave him a Moog synthesizer as a present when he was 12, which was also around the time when he started playing piano. He received basic instruction initially from his father, who played by ear. Taborn borrowed records from a public library and listened to public radio, discovering music from the Association for the Advancement of Creative Musicians and Sun Ra, among others. As a youth he also listened to heavy metal and contemporary classical music, and identified commonalities among these disparate forms of music.

At high school, Taborn studied music theory and composition for two years with teachers who had doctorates in music. In his own words, he is "not a classically trained pianist at all"; he practiced with others, initially playing rock, progressive rock, and jazz fusion, before becoming more interested in jazz. He borrowed from the library Segments II (Orchestra Of Two Continents) by pianist Cecil Taylor's band while at high school, but found separating the various elements of the music too difficult. After attending a Last Exit concert (a loud free jazz band of Peter Brötzmann, Bill Laswell, Ronald Shannon Jackson and Sonny Sharrock), he went home and listened to the Taylor album again: "It was more manageable in terms of being able to hear detail and listen to content. That was a big moment in terms of being able to relax and process information in more abstract environments."

== Later life and career ==
=== 1988–1999 ===
Taborn studied at the University of Michigan in Ann Arbor from 1988. He auditioned for the jazz program in the university's School of Music, but joined the College of Literature, Science and the Arts. Taborn met drummer Gerald Cleaver soon after arriving at university, and they established an electronic group, the Tracey Science Quartet. Taborn also played with Marcus Belgrave and Wendell Harrison. While still a university student, he became known for his membership of saxophonist James Carter's band, where he contributed to a series of albums, beginning with JC on the Set, which was recorded in 1993.

Taborn's first recording as leader came in 1994, and was released by DIW. Craig Taborn Trio, with bassist Jaribu Shahid and drummer Tani Tabbal, featured Taborn playing in a range of styles on piano and included several of his own compositions. At this stage in his career, his comments on his tastes in composition and performance were: "Even though I like avant garde jazz and classical music, I like to swing. I like to work with harmony and melody in my own music, and I like acoustical instruments. But I can be quite dictatorial about the composed section, and lay down in great detail what everyone is supposed to do and how they should do it."

Frequent performances and tours with Carter and others meant that Taborn's studies were delayed: he graduated from university with a BA in general studies (rather than the intended English literature) in April 1995, after which he moved to New York. He continued playing with Carter into 1998. In the late 1990s, Taborn also recorded with saxophonist Roscoe Mitchell (Taborn's first appearance on the ECM label), and for techno producer Carl Craig's album Programmed as part of Innerzone Orchestra.

=== 2000–2009 ===
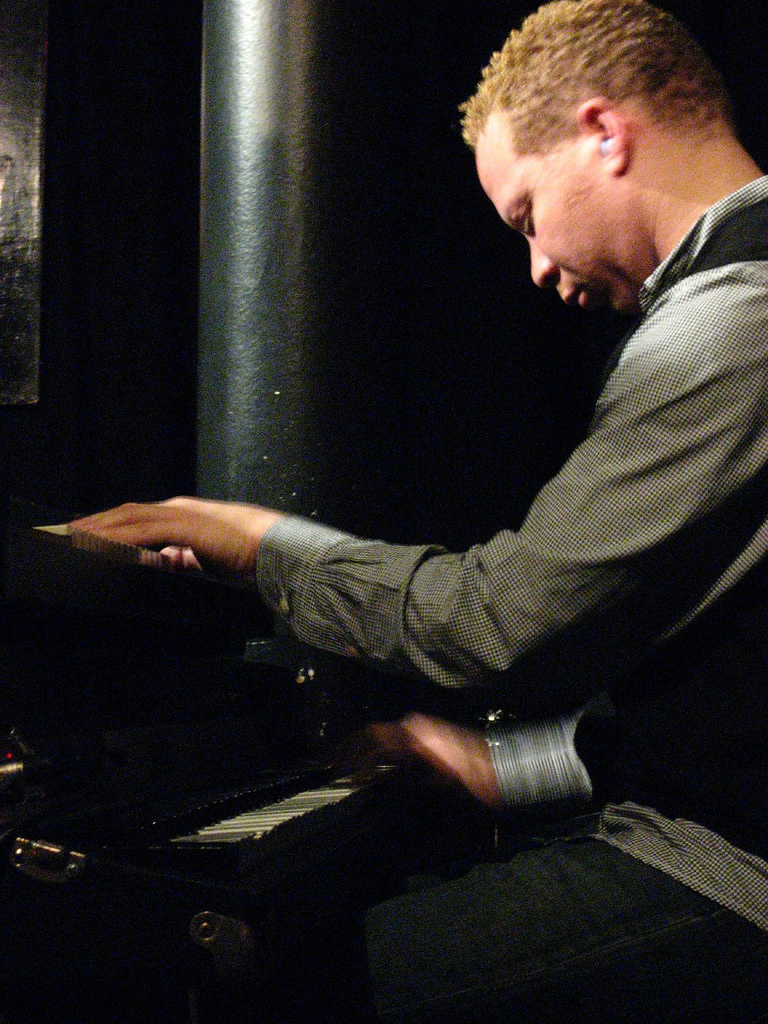
Taborn in 2008

In 2001, Taborn made his second recording as leader: Light Made Lighter, for Thirsty Ear, with Chris Lightcap on bass and Cleaver on drums. "On the strength of this recording", wrote the Los Angeles Times reviewer, "Taborn emerges as one of the most exciting pianists to lead a band since the ascent of Matthew Shipp". Another reviewer commented that "Taborn seems to revel in the cracks the way [Thelonious] Monk did, hitting the awkward-sounding notes between the notes to punctuate his lines".

In the 2000s, "Taborn became one of the most in-demand musicians in New York", in the words of one biographer. He played and recorded with a large, diverse range of musicians, in both free jazz and more mainstream bands, and playing various keyboard and electronic instruments. One critic observed that a lot of his collaborations in the early and mid-2000s did not feature a bassist, and suggested that Taborn's "dexterity and inventiveness [...] stand in for both a keyboard and a bass player." In 2001, he had his first solo concert in New York, and made his first recordings under the leadership of saxophonist Tim Berne, and with a trio led by percussionist Susie Ibarra. On these, he employed electronics as well as piano. Taborn went on to record, during the period 2002–04, as a sideman under the leadership of Steve Coleman, Dave Douglas, Marty Ehrlich, Drew Gress, Evan Parker, Wadada Leo Smith, and others. In 2003, Taborn toured Europe with Ibarra's band, and played with saxophonist Lotte Anker for the first time.

Taborn's third release as a leader was Junk Magic in 2004, again for Thirsty Ear, with tenor saxophonist Aaron Stewart, violist Mat Maneri and drummer Dave King. The album's title was also the name of the band, which was formed to be Taborn's electronic group, allowing him to explore the interactions of composition, improvisation and electronics. Texture and pulse were important contributors to the overall sound.

Taborn played with Chris Potter from around 2005, and toured Europe with the saxophonist's Underground band early in 2007. The pianist played the Monterey Jazz Festival in 2007. In late 2007 and early 2008, Taborn toured internationally with Underground, guitarist David Torn's Prezens, as well as being part of shorter tours and making occasional appearances with Cleaver, Gress, Ibarra, Mitchell, and William Parker. In April 2008 he toured Europe with Berne's Science Friction, was back in Europe for the first three weeks of the following month, this time as part of David Binney's quartet, and returned there in November with Potter. Taborn remarked in 2008 that he was attempting to phase out his use of a laptop in performance, to allow him to concentrate more on improvising, and that he had delayed further performances as a leader, owing to finances. In the same year, he commented on the number of regular, working bands he was a member of: "You could say 15 to 20. But if you're talking about the ones that are regularly working right now, I'd have to say seven or eight."

After joining Michael Formanek's quartet in 2008, Taborn recorded under the double bassist's leadership for the first time the following year. Also in 2009, Taborn played with trumpeter Tomasz Stańko in New York, and returned to Europe for concerts with Torn, violinist Dominique Pifarély, and with his own trio.

=== 2010–present ===
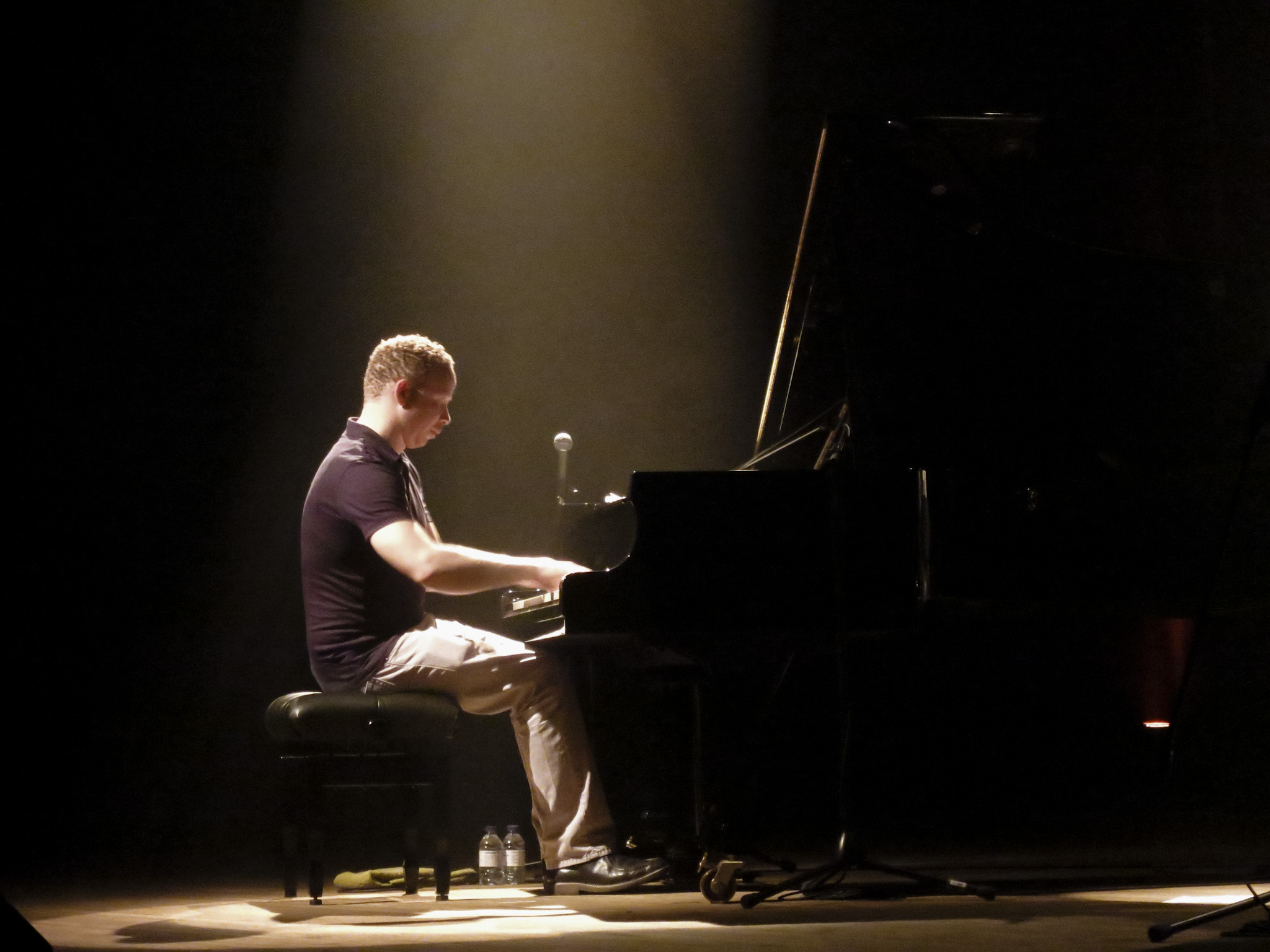
Taborn at Seixal Jazz, 2014

In the early 2010s, Taborn continued playing and recording with others, but also had more solo concerts than earlier in his career. He had a solo tour of Europe in 2010, which may have led to an agreement with ECM to record his first solo piano album, Avenging Angel, which was released in 2011. In critic Nate Chinen's view, this album concentrated on "pure sound", being "full of moments where a note hangs sharply in the air, and you hear the gathering overtones, the vibrations of the strings". The album helped Taborn get more attention as a leader.

In 2010, Taborn also toured Europe with Anker's trio, Potter's Underground, and played piano duets with Vijay Iyer. In the following year, Taborn again performed with Stańko, as part of drummer Paul Motian's quartet, and had another solo tour of Europe. Taborn toured internationally with his own trio, Anker's trio, and with Dave Holland's quartet Prism in 2012, and remained part of Holland's band into 2014.

A further ECM album, Chants, led by Taborn and with bassist Thomas Morgan and drummer Gerald Cleaver, was released in 2013. This was the trio's first release after eight years together. At this point, Taborn's comments on composition and group performance were: "I knew that if I created a context and then deferred, fully, to Gerald's and Thomas's sensibilities it would inherently be stimulating and would also challenge the context. [...] I'd much rather engage with the group, always, than have the format be 'piano adventures with supporting cast'." This band began a tour of Europe in 2014, but Cleaver was replaced by J.T. Bates part of the way through it, owing to illness. Earlier the same year, Taborn played in a small group led by guitarist Bill Frisell. Taborn played as part of the Ches Smith Trio late in 2014 and toured with the percussionist and Mat Maneri early in 2016. His sixth album as leader, Flaga: Book of Angels Volume 27, was released in 2016. The trio recording, with Christian McBride on bass and Tyshawn Sorey on drums, employed compositions by John Zorn. Taborn's next ECM album was the quartet Daylight Ghosts, which combined electronic and acoustic elements. This was followed by a string of duo albums: Octopus with Kris Davis from 2016; Highsmith with Ikue Mori in 2017; and The Transitory Poems with Iyer from 2018. 16 years after their first album, Junk Magic had a second released in 2020 – Compass Confusion, with the Taborn-led band expanded to a quintet. Taborn's second solo piano album, Shadow Plays, was recorded in concert in 2020. The following year, Taborn made available for free streaming 60 X Sixty – 60 tracks of around a minute in length, played in a random order at 60xsixty.com.

== Character and preferences ==
According to Jazz Police, Taborn is "basically shy" and prefers to "let his music do the talking", which is why he "doesn't have, or want, his own website". He also has a minimal social media presence and controls all of his US bookings personally. Some of his friends told The New York Times author of a 2017 profile piece on Taborn "how relieved they were that someone, at last, was profiling him, as if he were being forced out of hiding".

Taborn has explained the limited quantity of albums under his own name as being driven by the "age of almost profligate documentation", which he counters with "almost a discipline to be more selective about releases." He does, however, frequently record his own playing, so that he can study it.

== Artistry ==
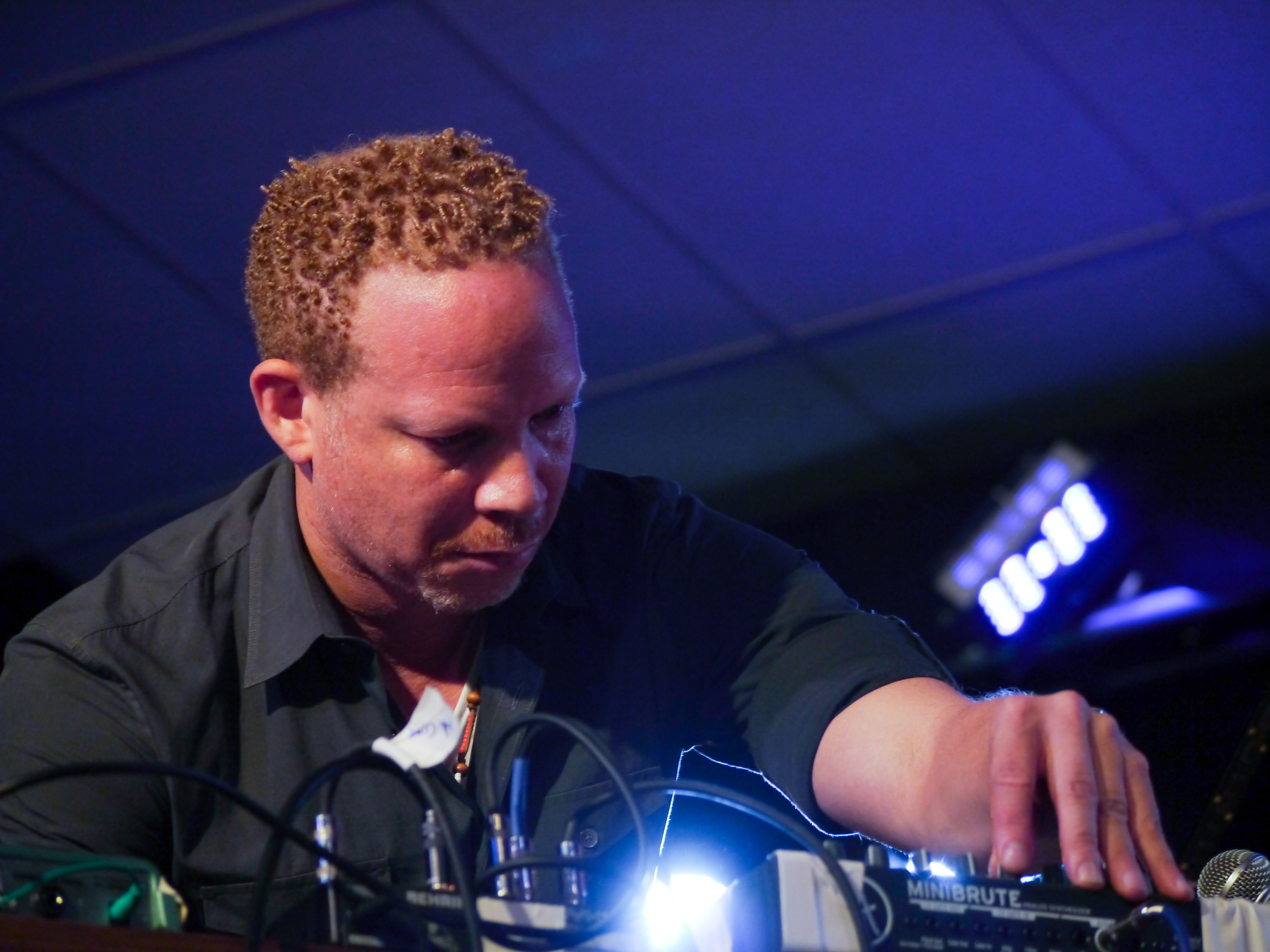
Taborn at the Monterey Jazz Festival, 2013

Taborn's range of playing styles was summarized by Mike Hobart in The Financial Times: Taborn "draws obliquely on the jazz tradition [...] he is as at home in free improvisation as he is in composition". In an interview for Down Beat in 2011, Taborn described his improvising style, particularly for solo piano. When playing, he often adopts a modular approach, using small units of melody and rhythm and then developing them. This can begin from as little as three notes, with structure being built around referring back to elements of the units. He starts simply, using basic elements such as major and minor thirds, varies them in turn, and then continues to expand to create larger structures. He uses a combination of his attack and the piano's sustain pedal to draw attention to the upper partials of a note; this allows a heightened contrast between notes to be perceived.

Taborn has commented on the similarities and differences in his playing on piano and electronic instruments. Comparing his accompaniments on piano and Fender Rhodes, he said that:

I play some of the same chords on the piano, but there are definitely things I would do on the piano because it's a more transparent instrument that I wouldn't do on the Rhodes. [...] The Rhodes is so strong that when you play something on it, it really can dictate, because it's louder and the timbre is much more opaque. So you leave more holes. On the piano, I would maybe play more sustain chords.

Taborn prefers earlier models of Fender Rhodes, for their raunchier sound. He also attempts to retain control over the sound that is presented to an audience when playing electronic instruments: he links his instruments to his own amplifier, and then has the venue take its feed from that amplifier.

Guitarist David Torn commented that Taborn is "the rare musician who takes the approach, 'What can I do with this instrument?' rather than playing through its book of techniques. [...He] is able to eschew the technological aspect in order to get out the sounds that he feels are suitable for the music."

== Compositions ==
Taborn incorporates requirements to improvise within his compositions. Commenting on his writing for trio and quartet, Taborn stated that "I like multiple kinds of rhythmic things. On their own, they're not so complicated, but when you fit them together, it sounds a little mysterious. A lot of that writing extends from my trio writing, where I'm writing things that are playable in real time. There's a certain orchestration you can get out of a four-piece. How far can we suggest a larger ensemble? [I want] to create the illusion of a larger ensemble". His compositions typically do not include chord changes, but contain superimposed, contrapuntal melodies.

== Awards ==
In 2009 and 2010, Down Beat critics selected Taborn as the electric keyboard rising star winner. In 2011, he was chosen as winner of the electric keyboard category, as well as rising star in both the piano and organ categories. In 2012, he was given the North Sea Jazz Festival's Paul Acket Award, which is presented "to an artist deserving wider recognition for extraordinary musicianship". JazzTimes ranked Taborn in their 2013 critics' poll as best piano player. In 2014, the Jazz Journalists Association awarded him the Pianist of the Year award.

In 2014, Taborn was given a Doris Duke Artist Award, worth up to $275,000 and given to "exemplary individual artists in contemporary dance, jazz, theatre and related interdisciplinary work who have proven their artistic vitality and commitment to their field."

In October 2025, Taborn was awarded a MacArthur Foundation Fellowship.

== Discography ==
=== As leader/co-leader ===
Year recorded	Year released	Title	Label	Notes
1994	1994	Craig Taborn Trio	DIW	Trio, with Jaribu Shahid (bass), Tani Tabbal (drums)
2001	2001	Light Made Lighter	Thirsty Ear	Trio, with Chris Lightcap (bass), Gerald Cleaver (drums)
2004	2004	Junk Magic	Thirsty Ear	Quartet, with Aaron Stewart (tenor sax), Mat Maneri (viola), Dave King (drums)
2010	2011	Avenging Angel	ECM	Solo piano
2012	2013	Chants	ECM	Trio, with Thomas Morgan (bass), Gerald Cleaver (drums)
2015	2017	Ljubljana	Clean Feed	Duo, co-led with Mats Gustafsson (slide sax, baritone sax)
2015	2016	Flaga: Book of Angels Volume 27	Tzadik	Trio, with Christian McBride (bass), Tyshawn Sorey (drums)
2016	2017	Daylight Ghosts	ECM	Quartet, with Chris Speed (tenor sax, clarinet), Chris Lightcap (bass), Dave King (drums)
2016	2018	Octopus	Pyroclastic	Duo, co-led with Kris Davis (piano)
2017	2017	Highsmith	Tzadik	Duo, co-led with Ikue Mori (electronics)
2017	2019	Da'at	Tzadik	Six tracks solo piano; two tracks duo, with Vadim Neselovskyi (piano); other tracks do not feature Taborn
2018	2019	The Transitory Poems	ECM	Duo, co-led with Vijay Iyer (piano)
2018	2019	Golden Valley Is Now	Intakt	Trio, co-led with Reid Anderson (electric bass, electronics), Dave King (drums)
2020	2020	Compass Confusion	Pyroclastic	As "Junk Magic"; quintet, with Chris Speed (tenor sax, clarinet), Mat Maneri (viola), Erik Fratzke (bass), Dave King (drums)
2020	2021	Shadow Plays	ECM	Solo piano; in concert
2022	2023	hEARoes	Rogueart	Trio, co-led with Joëlle Léandre (bass), Mat Maneri (viola); in concert
2022	2024	Weird of Mouth	Otherly Love	Trio, co-led with Mette Rasmussen (alto sax, percussion), Ches Smith (drums, percussion)
2024	2025	Trio of Bloom	Pyroclastic	Trio, co-led with Nels Cline (guitar, bass), Marcus Gilmore (drums, percussion)
2024	2026	Dream Archives	ECM	Trio, with Tomeka Reid (violoncello), Ches Smith (drums, percussion, vibraphone, electronics)
