= The Darkseid Recital =

Live album by Darius Jones & Matthew Shipp
- Released: 2014
- Recorded: 2011−2013
- Venue: The Jazz Standard & The Stone, New York City
- Genre: Jazz
- Length: 45:22
- Label: AUM Fidelity
- Producer: Steven Joerg

Darius Jones chronology
Lung (2013)	The Darkseid Recital (2014)	The Oversoul Manual (2014)

Matthew Shipp chronology
Root of Things (2014)	The Darkseid Recital (2014)	I've Been to Many Places (2014)

The Darkseid Recital is an album by American jazz saxophonist Darius Jones and pianist Matthew Shipp, which was recorded live between 2011 and 2013 and released on the AUM Fidelity label. It was their second duo following Cosmic Lieder. The record is named for the character Darkseid created by comic artist Jack Kirby, and song titles reference concepts and characters from Kirby's New Gods series and other DC Comics.

== Reception ==
Professional ratings
Review scores
Source	Rating
AllMusic	4/5 stars
Down Beat	4/5 stars

In his review for AllMusic, Thom Jurek states "The Darkseid Recital is the sound of peers who use improvisation to inquire about the nature of sound and song, but also as a form of discovery that confidently communicates by delivering a welcoming music with uncompromising sophistication, rigorous discipline and passion."

The Down Beat review by Bill Meyer notes that "Shipp has found in Jones a musician whose facility with classical forms, dynamic range and inventiveness in the moment match his own.. But part of what makes these two musicians so compatible is Jones’ singularity."

In his review for JazzTimes Mike Shanley says "This music does not go down easily. Jones possesses a mastery of his horn’s entire range, which means he can potentially shatter glass with his altissimo shrieks. Shipp’s love of his instrument’s low end nearly drowns Jones out during one track."

The Point of Departure review by Jason Bivins states "With deep experience and a shared improvisational milieu, the pair’s contrasting styles but deep commitment to exploration make this release as buoyantly expressive as it is pensive."

== Track listing ==
All compositions by Darius Jones & Matthew Shipp

1. "Celestial Fountain" - 2:36
2. "2,327,694,748" - 6:42
3. "Granny Goodness" - 4:30
4. "Gardens of Yivaroth" - 6:28
5. "Lord of Woe" - 6:03
6. "Life Equation" - 4:05
7. "Sepulchre of Mandrakk" - 5:01
8. "Divine Engine" - 4:09
9. "Novus' Final Gift" - 5:48

== Personnel ==
- Darius Jones – alto sax
- Matthew Shipp – piano
