= The Peach Orchard (album) =

Live album by William Parker's In Order to Survive
- Released: December 8, 1998
- Recorded: February 7 and July 2, 1997, March 20 & 21, 1998; Alterknit, Knitting Factory and Context, NYC
- Genre: Avant-Garde Jazz
- Length: 135:50
- Label: AUM Fidelity; AUM 010/11
- Producer: Steven Joerg

William Parker chronology
Lifting the Sanctions (1998)	The Peach Orchard (1998)	Posium Pendasem (1998)

The Peach Orchard is a double live album by American jazz bassist William Parker and his group In Order to Survive, which was recorded at various venues in New York City in 1997-98 and released on the AUM Fidelity label.

== Reception ==
Professional ratings
Review scores
Source	Rating
AllMusic	4.5/5 stars
The Penguin Guide to Jazz Recordings	4/4 stars

In his review for AllMusic, Tom Schulte states "This cream of the New York, contemporary, free jazz scene veers from such challenging, busy compositions as the explosive first track "Thoth" to such reflective pieces as "Moholo," basically a study in rhythmic intricacy". The JazzTimes review noted "the quartet-rounded out by alto saxophonist Rob Brown, pianist Cooper-Moore, and drummer Susie Ibarra-interprets Parker's often daunting structures with a fiery clarity".

== Track listing ==
All compositions by William Parker

Disc One:

1. "Thot" - 14:12
2. "Moholo" - 18:51
3. "Three Clay Pots" - 15:24
4. "The Peach Orchard" - 20:45

Disc Two:

1. "Posium Pendasem #3" - 11:36
2. "Leaf Dance" - 25:28
3. "Theme from Pelikan" - 17:10
4. "In Order to Survive" - 12:24
- Tracks 2-2 & 2-3 recorded direct to DAT at Alterknit, NYC on February 7, 1997.
- Tracks 1-2, 1-3 & 2-4 recorded on 8-track at Knitting Factory, NYC on July 2, 1997.
- Tracks 1-1 & 1-4 recorded on 8-track at Context, NYC on March 20, 1998.
- Track 2-1 recorded on 8-track at Context, NYC on March 21, 1998.

== Personnel ==
- William Parker - bass
- Rob Brown - alto saxophone
- Cooper-Moore - piano
- Susie Ibarra - drums
- Assif Tsahar - bass clarinet on Disc Two, track #1
