= Feel the Sunshine (album) =

Studio album by Hugh Ragin
- Released: 2002
- Recorded: October 19 and 20, 2001
- Studio: Sound on Sound Studios, New York City
- Genre: Free jazz
- Length: 1:09:10
- Label: Justin Time; JUST 182-2
- Producer: Hugh Ragin, Jim West

Hugh Ragin chronology
Fanfare & Fiesta (2001)	Feel the Sunshine (2002)	Sound Pictures for Solo Trumpet (2002)

Feel the Sunshine is an album by trumpeter Hugh Ragin. It was recorded on October 19 and 20, 2001, at Sound on Sound Studios in New York City, and was released in 2002 by Justin Time Records. On the album, Ragin is joined by saxophonist Assif Tsahar, pianist Craig Taborn, bassist Jaribu Shahid, and drummer Tani Tabbal.

== Reception ==
Professional ratings
Review scores
Source	Rating
AllMusic	3/5 stars
The Penguin Guide to Jazz	3/4 stars

In a review for AllMusic, Paula Edelstein called the album "a diverse, stylistic gem," and wrote: "Ragin's concept behind Feel the Sunshine is one of peace in the jazz community and the world community... the songs are sequenced so that the listener's musical moods are quickly returned to the CD's thematic concept."

The authors of The Penguin Guide to Jazz Recordings called the album "a remarkable record," and "among the best" of saxophonist Tsahar's sessions. They also praised the rhythm section's "reliable inventiveness... a highly reactive and sometimes split-second empathy with Ragin's ideas."

Larry Appelbaum of JazzTimes called Ragin's contribution "simply masterful," and noted that he "has the chops and imagination to impress the stodgiest of moldy figs," playing "inside, outside and downright funky."

Writing for All About Jazz Jim Santella stated that Ragin's "adventurous nature remains evident from start to finish. Standards and originals swing, while introducing flights of fancy throughout. The ensemble interprets with clarity and a natural ease... This one comes recommended for its ease of understanding and its enjoyable attitude."

== Track listing ==
1. "Caravan" – 8:29
2. "Feel the Sunshine" – 13:07
3. "Hugh's Blues" – 6:04
4. "Pain" – 11:43
5. "Gulf Coast Groove" – 6:36
6. "Easy Living" – 8:10
7. "Master Mind" – 3:09
8. "Freedom Jazz Dance" – Freedom Jazz Dance
9. "Say Goodbye" – 2:08

== Personnel ==
- Hugh Ragin – trumpet
- Assif Tsahar – saxophone
- Craig Taborn – piano
- Jaribu Shahid – bass
- Tani Tabbal – drums
