= Compassion Seizes Bed-Stuy =

Studio album by William Parker
- Released: 1996
- Recorded: December 18, 1995
- Studio: Tedesco Studio, Paramus, NJ
- Genre: Jazz
- Length: 69:29
- Label: Homestead
- Producer: William Parker

William Parker chronology
Testimony (1996)	Compassion Seizes Bed-Stuy (1996)	Sunrise in the Tone World (1997)

Compassion Seizes Bed-Stuy is an album by the American jazz double bassist William Parker, recorded in 1995 and released on Homestead.

The album is the third part of a sound trilogy including the sextet In Order to Survive and the solo bass Testimony. In Order to Survive is the name of the ensemble, a quartet with Rob Brown on alto sax, Cooper-Moore on piano, and newcomer Susie Ibarra on drums. "Unrestricted" is a piano-drums duo dedicated to saxophonist Julius Hemphill. "Goggles" is dedicated to bassist Earl Freeman. "For Robeson" is for Paul Robeson. "Malcolm's Smiles" is for Malcolm X. The cover art is a "MusicWitness" painting made during live recording by Jeff Schlanger.

== Reception ==
Professional ratings
Review scores
Source	Rating
AllMusic	4/5 stars
The Penguin Guide to Jazz	3.5/4 stars

In his review for AllMusic, Don Snowden states "Slack moments are rare and the evenly balanced contributions of all four musicians make this a fine example of freewheeling collective improvisation." The Penguin Guide to Jazz says that compared with the previous album the tracks "are more developed and feature some of the bassist's very best writing." In a double review for the Chicago Reader, Peter Margasak says that Parker's original compositions "employ a variety of melodic and structural gambits toward a single goal: highly sensitive and all-enveloping improvisation." In an article for the Boston Phoenix Ed Hazell notes that "Each track is a cathartic cry from the heart, complex, yet with utter clarity of structure."

== Track listing ==
All compositions by William Parker

1. "Compassion" – 10:38
2. "Malcom's Smile" – 9:44
3. "For Robeson" – 5:41
4. "Holiday for Hypocrites" – 8:10
5. "Testimony of the Last Flower" – 0:37
6. "Dejenos en Paz" – 8:05
7. "Unrestricted (for Julius Hemphill)" – 5:42
8. "Goggles" – 10:53
9. "The Eye of the Window" – 9:59

== Personnel ==
- William Parker – bass
- Susie Ibarra – drums
- Rob Brown – alto sax
- Cooper-Moore – piano
