= Guerino Mazzola =

Guerino Bruno Mazzola
- At University of Zurich, 2002

Background information
- Born: Guerino Mazzola; 2 February 1947 (age 79)
- Origin: Dübendorf (Canton of Zürich), Switzerland
- Genres: Free jazz
- Occupations: Mathematician, music theorist, musician
- Instrument: Piano
- Website: www.encyclospace.org

Guerino Bruno Mazzola (born 1947) is a Swiss mathematician, musicologist, jazz pianist, and writer.

== Education and career ==
Mazzola obtained his PhD in mathematics at University of Zürich in 1971 under the supervision of Herbert Groß and Bartel Leendert van der Waerden. In 1980, he habilitated in algebraic geometry and representation theory. In 2000, he was awarded the medal of the Mexican Mathematical Society. In 2003, he was habilitated in computational science at the University of Zürich.

Mazzola was an associate professor at Laval University in 1996 and at Ecole Normale Supérieure in Paris in 2005. Since 2007, he is professor at the School of Music at the University of Minnesota. From 2007 to 2021 he was the president of the Society for Mathematics and Computation in Music.

Mazzola is well known for his music theory book The Topos of Music. The result has drawn dissent from Dmitri Tymoczko, who said of Mazzola: "If you can't learn algebraic geometry, he sometimes seems to be saying, then you have no business trying to understand Mozart."

== Records ==
Mazzola has recorded several free jazz CDs with musicians like Mat Maneri, Heinz Geisser, Sirone, Jeff Kaiser, Scott Fields, Matt Turner and Rob Brown. His 2010 album Dancing the Body of Time was recorded in concert at the Pit Inn in Tokyo.

== Playing style ==
A reviewer of Dancing the Body of Time mentioned similarities between Mazzola's playing style and that of Cecil Taylor. This was also mentioned by the AllMusic reviewer of Mazzola's earlier Toni's Delight: Live in Seoul, who also stated that Mazzola "infuses his incredible technique with a blues aesthetic and a sometimes-romantic stamp, overwhelming everything in his path".

== Bibliography ==
- Gruppen und Kategorien in der Musik. Hermann (1985) ISBN 3-88538-210-5.
- Rasterbild - Bildraster, CAD-gestützte Analyse von Raffaels "Schule von Athen". Springer (1987) ISBN 9783540172673.
- Geometrie der Töne. Birkhäuser (1990) ISBN 3-7643-2353-1.
- Ansichten eines Hirns. Birkhäuser (1990) ISBN 3-7643-2484-8.
- The Topos of Music, Geometric Logic of Concepts, Theory, and Performance. Birkhäuser (2002) ISBN 3-7643-5731-2.
- Perspectives in Mathematical Music Theory.. EpOs (2004). ISBN 978-3-923486-57-1.
- Comprehensive Mathematics for Computer Scientists I & II here and Errata here
- Elemente der Musikinformatik. Birkhäuser (2006) ISBN 3-7643-7745-3.
- La vérité du beau dans la musique. Delatour/IRCAM (2007) ISBN 2-7521-0029-9.
- Flow, Gesture, and Spaces in Free Jazz—Towards a Theory of Collaboration. Springer (2009) ISBN 978-3-540-92194-3.
- Musical Performance. Springer (2011) ISBN 978-3-642-11837-1.
- Musical Creativity—Strategies and Tools in Composition and Improvisation. Springer (2011) ISBN 978-3-642-24516-9.
- Computational Musicology in Hindustani Music. Springer (2014) ISBN 978-3319114712.
- Computational Counterpoint Worlds. Springer (2015) ISBN 978-3-319-11235-0.
- Cool Math for Hot Music. Springer (2016) ISBN 978-3-319-42935-9.
- All About Music. Springer (2016) ISBN 978-3-319-47334-5.
- The Topos of Music, 2nd ed. Vol. I: Theory. Springer (2017) ISBN 978-3-319-64364-9.
- The Topos of Music, 2nd ed. Vol. II: Performance. Springer (2017) ISBN 978-3-319-64444-8.
- The Topos of Music, 2nd ed. Vol. III: Gestures. Springer (2017) ISBN 978-3-319-64481-3.
- The Topos of Music, 2nd ed. Vol. IV: Roots. Springer (2017) ISBN 978-3-319-64495-0.
- Basic Music Technology. Springer (2018) ISBN 978-3-030-00982-3.
- The Future of Music. Springer (2020) ISBN 978-3-030-39708-1.
- Making Musical Time. Springer (2021) ISBN 978-3-030-85628-1.
- Functorial Semiotics for Creativity in Music and Mathematics. Springer (2022) ISBN 978-3-030-85192-7.

== Discography ==
- Mazzola/Piano Solo Kelvin Null OMP Records 1001 LP
- Mazzola/Piano Solo Akroasis Wergo SM 1024 LP
- Mazzola/Moor/Sollberger Aus dem Hinterhalt OMP Records 1002 LP
- Q4 Orchestra Lyons' Brood Creative Works CW 1018 CD
- Guerino Mazzola Synthesis SToA music ST-71.1001 CD
- Jan Beran Immaculate Concept SToA music ST-71.1002 CD
- Q4 Orchestra Yavapai Creative Works CW 1028 CD
- Rissi/Mazzola/Geisser Fuego Creative Works CW 1029 CD
- Brown/Mazzola/Geisser Orbit Music & Arts CD-1015 CD
- Mazzola/Geisser Toni's Delight Cadence Jazz Records 1090 CD
- Mazzola/Geisser/Fields/Turner Maze Quixotic Records 5002 CD
- Mazzola/Geisser /Fields/Maneri Heliopolis Cadence Jazz Records 1122 CD
- Mazzola/Geisser Folia Silkheart Records SHCD 153 CD
- Mazzola/Geisser/Rissi Tierra Cadence Jazz Records 1130 CD
- Mazzola/Geisser/Rissi Agua Cadence Jazz Records, 1150 CD
- Mazzola/Geisser Someday Silkheart Records 154 CD
- Mazzola/Geisser/Fields/Maneri Chronotomy BlackSaint 120173-2 CD
- Mazzola/Geisser/Kato/Saga Live at Airegin Ayler Records aylDL-056 CD
- Mazzola/Geisser/Rissi Herakleitos Ayler Records aylDL-069 CD
- Mazzola/Geisser/Rissi Aire Cadence Jazz Records 1130 CD
- Mazzola/Geisser/Kaiser/Sirone Liquid Bridges CD in Springer book Flow, Gesture, and Spaces
- Mazzola/Geisser/Onuma Dancing the Body of Time Cadence Jazz Records 1239 CD
- Mazzola/Park Passionate Message Silkheart Records 159 CD
- Mazzola/Geisser/Kita Ma pfMentum PFMCD116
- Mazzola/Lubet Deep State pfMentum PFMCD119
- Mazzola/Geisser Live at Le Classique pfMentum PFMCD126
- Mazzola/Leo/Lubet/Zielinski/Holdman Negative Space pfMentum PFMCD136
- Mazzola/Lubet Subtle pfMentum PFMCD141
