= Big Gurl (Smell My Dream) =

Studio album by Darius Jones
- Released: 2011
- Recorded: February 21, 2011
- Studio: Systems Two Studio, Brooklyn
- Genre: Jazz
- Length: 46:46
- Label: AUM Fidelity
- Producer: Darius Jones, Steven Joerg

Darius Jones chronology
Cosmic Lieder (2011)	Big Gurl (Smell My Dream) (2011)	Book of Mæ'bul (Another Kind of Sunrise) (2012)

Big Gurl (Smell My Dream) is an album by American jazz saxophonist Darius Jones, which was recorded in 2011 and released on the AUM Fidelity label. Big Gurl is a new character in the Man'ish Boy universe created by Jones and graphic artist Randal Wilcox.

== Background ==
The album features Jones' regular working trio with bassist Adam Lane and drummer Jazon Nazary. This was the second chapter in an autobiographical conceptual project that began with his debut, Man'ish Boy (A Raw & Beautiful Thing). Big Gurl takes inspiration from his years of study, experimentation and self-discovery at university in Richmond, VA where he began the search for his own voice. The record is dedicated to George Clinton and the Parliament-Funkadelic. "A Train" is based on Billy Strayhorn jazz standard "Take the 'A' Train". "Ol' Metal-Face Bastard" is an homage to underground hip-hop performers MF Doom and Ol' Dirty Bastard.

== Reception ==
Professional ratings
Review scores
Source	Rating
Down Beat	4/5 stars

The Down Beat review by Alain Drouot states "Jones strikes hard from the onset and eschews conventions by developing over an insistent groove multifaceted choruses articulated around probing lines that open many avenues. Elsewhere, Lane and Nazary can lay out intricate backdrops that spur the saxophonist and encourage him to constantly look for ways to add a new dimension to his playing."

The All About Jazz review by Troy Collins says "Fulfilling (and exceeding) expectations, Big Gurl (Smell My Dream) is a rightfully compelling follow-up to his stunning debut. With another installment already in the works, Jones has set the stage for a winning series of albums designed to document his rise as one of the most impressive and unique voices of our time."

In another review for All About Jazz, John Sharpe states "Jones develops his ideas excitingly, delivering impassioned invective in a hoarse throaty dialect. He utilizes the full range of his alto, from keening ululations to lowing textures, via controlled harmonics."

In his review for JazzTimes Carlo Wolff notes that "this tight-knit group knows its way around free-form jazz, funk, even metal.. Still, this music swings on a foundation built of the blues, with Jones’ smears and mild vibrato underlining its vocal quality."

== Track listing ==
All compositions by Darius Jones

1. "E-Gaz" – 4:23
2. "Michele (Heart) Willie" – 6:56
3. "A Train" – 6:03
4. "I Wish I Had a Choice" – 7:15
5. "My Special 'D'" – 7:37
6. "Chasing the Ghost" – 6:34
7. "Ol' Metal-Faced Bastard'" – 7:58

== Personnel ==
- Darius Jones - alto sax
- Adam Lane – bass
- Jason Nazary – drums
