= Live in Sant'Anna Arresi, 2004 =

Live album by David S. Ware
- Released: 2016
- Recorded: September 5, 2004
- Venue: Sant'Anna Arresi, Italy
- Genre: Jazz
- Length: 45:58
- Label: AUM Fidelity
- Producer: Steven Joerg

David S. Ware chronology
Live at Jazzfestival Saalfelden 2011 (2012)	Live in Sant'Anna Arresi, 2004 (2016)	Live in New York, 2010 (2017)

Live in Sant'Anna Arresi, 2004 is an album by American jazz saxophonist David S. Ware, a duo performance with pianist Matthew Shipp recorded in 2004 at Ai confini tra Sardegna e Jazz festival, but not issued until 2016 by AUM Fidelity label. It was the second volume in the David S. Ware Archive Series, after the expanded reissue of Birth of a Being.

== Reception ==
Professional ratings
Review scores
Source	Rating
Down Beat	4.5/5 stars

The All About Jazz review by Karl Ackermann says "we have unconstrained improvisation, sensibly executed with neither excess nor self-imposed limitation. Both Ware and Shipp effect knotty, non-linear phrases only to break off in unexpected directions."

In a review for Down Beat, Bill Meyer notes "Shipp spends considerable time under his piano’s lid, creating otherworldly bursts of pure, fragile sound that contrast most productively with Ware’s fiery blowing."

The Point of Departure review by Chris Robinson states "Ware and Matthew Shipp played a forty minute improvised duo set that is stunning in its urgency, vitality, virtuosity, and coherence as a large scale work."

== Track listing ==
All compositions by Ware / Shipp.

1. "Tao Flow Part 1" – 21:06
2. "Tao Flow Part 2" – 20:23
3. "Encore" – 4:29

== Personnel ==
- David S. Ware – tenor saxophone
- Matthew Shipp – piano
