= Planetary Unknown =

Studio album by David S. Ware
- Released: June 14, 2011
- Recorded: November 23, 2010; Systems Two Studio, Brooklyn, NY
- Genre: Jazz
- Length: 72:25
- Label: AUM Fidelity; AUM 068
- Producer: Steven Joerg & David S. Ware

David S. Ware chronology
Onecept (2010)	Planetary Unknown (2011)	Organica (2011)

Planetary Unknown is an album by saxophonist David S. Ware which was recorded in 2010 and released on the AUM Fidelity label.

== Reception ==
Professional ratings
Review scores
Source	Rating
AllMusic	4/5 stars

In his review for AllMusic, arwulf arwulf said "Anyone who knows and loves modern creative improvised music is sure to be moved by the combination of hearts and minds preserved on this recording".

The All About Jazz review noted "Planetary Unknown marks the first time this quartet played together, though that isn't apparent, given the music's deep roots and connections... the program has the air of a twenty-first century classic about it". The JazzTimes review by Mike Shanley commented "Although no one actually leads the session, Ware’s personality—or perhaps his strong tone—seems to direct much of the proceedings".

== Track listing ==
All compositions by David S. Ware, Cooper-Moore, Muhammad Ali & William Parker

1. "Passage Wudang" - 21:56
2. "Shift" - 7:34
3. "Duality Is One" - 7:00
4. "Divination" - 9:27
5. "Crystal Palace" - 3:40
6. "Divination Unfathomable" - 9:26
7. "Ancestry Supramental" - 13:25

== Personnel ==
- David S. Ware – tenor saxophone, sopranino saxophone, stritch
- Cooper-Moore – piano
- William Parker – bass
- Muhammad Ali – drums
