= Assif Tsahar =

Israeli musical artist

Assif Tsahar אסיף צהר
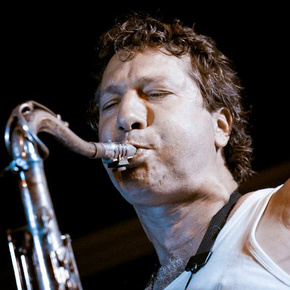
- Saxophonist Assif Tsahar in Levontin7, tel aviv 2011, photographed by Almit Alfonta

Background information
- Born: June 11, 1969 (age 57); Israel
- Genre: Jazz
- Instruments: Tenor saxophone Bass clarinet

Assif Tsahar (Hebrew: אסיף צהר; born Israel, June 11, 1969) is an Israeli tenor saxophonist and bass clarinetist. He has lived in New York City since 1990.

He has performed with Cecil Taylor, Butch Morris, William Parker, Mat Maneri, Hamid Drake, Peter Kowald, Susie Ibarra, Rashied Ali, Warren Smith, Wilbur Morris, Le Quan Ninh, John Tchicai, Fred Anderson, Rob Brown, Roy Campbell, Gerald Cleaver, Agusti Fernandez, Ken Vandermark, Kent Kessler, Joe Daley, Herb Robertson, Cuong Vu, Chris Jonas, Ori Kaplan, Oscar Noriega, Roman Stolyar, Alex Harding, Steve Swell, Cooper-Moore, and Tom Abbs

He founded the label Hopscotch Records in 1999. In 2006 he opened the music club Levontin7 with Daniel Sarid in Tel Aviv.

== Discography ==
=== As leader or co-leader ===
- Shekhina (Eremite, 1996)
- Ein Sof (Silkheart, 1997)
- Home Cookin (Hopscotch, 1998)
- The Hollow World (Hopscotch, 1999)
- Open Systems (Marge, 2001)
- Soul Bodies, vol. 1 (Ayler, 2001)
- Ma: Live at the Fundacio Juan Miro (Hopscotch, 2002)
- Come Sunday (Hopscotch, 2003)
- America (Hopscotch, 2003)
- JAM (Hopscotch, 2003)
- Lost Brother (Hopscotch, 2005)
- Code Re(a)d (Hopscotch, 2011)

=== Digital Primitives ===
- Digital Primitives (Hopscotch, 2007)
- Hum Crackle & Pop (Hopscotch, 2009)

=== As sideman ===
With Rashied Ali

- Deals, Ideas & Ideals (Hopscotch, 2001)

With Rob Brown

- Scratching the Surface (CIMP, 1998)

With Andy McWain

- Resemblance (Fuller Street Music, 2008)
- Starfish (Fuller Street Music, 2003)

With William Parker

- Sunrise in the Tone World (AUM Fidelity, 1995)
- Mass for the Healing of the World (Black Saint, 1998 [2003])

With Hugh Ragin

- Feel the Sunshine (Justin Time, 2002)
- Revelation (Justin Time, 2004)
