= BalladWare =

Studio album by David S. Ware Quartet
- Released: September 26, 2006
- Recorded: March 31, 1999
- Studio: Avatar, New York City
- Genre: Jazz
- Length: 69:17
- Label: Thirsty Ear; THI 57173.2
- Producer: Steven Joerg

David S. Ware chronology
Live in the World (2005)	BalladWare (2006)	Renunciation (2007)

BalladWare is an album by saxophonist and composer David S. Ware's Quartet which was recorded in 1999 but not released on the Thirsty Ear label until 2006.

== Reception ==
Professional ratings
Review scores
Source	Rating
AllMusic	4/5 stars
PopMatters	7/10 stars
The Penguin Guide to Jazz Recordings	3.5/4 stars

In his review for AllMusic, Thom Jurek states "This is a gorgeous and moving recording, one that may show Ware's snobbish, academic detractors that it's time to shut up and listen, but it doesn't matter. What's here is a document of another of Ware's many facets as a leader, soloist, and composer. For the curious, it is also a solid introduction to the man and his work. This is the sound of tenderness and an open heart: come on in". PopMatters observed "This release contains more soul in a couple of randomly chosen seconds than most of today’s singers could muster in an entire career. You want to know the trick of it? David S. Ware ain’t fooling around here. He means every single moment of it".

The All About Jazz review said "Not just an exercise in restraint, BalladWare is a melancholy investigation of roads rarely traveled, and quite rich in simmering detailit seems that Ware is once again searching for some new musical plane that may be unknown but definitely makes the journey interesting".

== Track listing ==
All compositions by David S. Ware except as indicated

1. "Yesterdays" (Otto Harbach, Jerome Kern) - 9:18
2. "Dao" - 10:34
3. "Autumn Leaves" (Joseph Kosma, Johnny Mercer, Jacques Prévert) - 7:50
4. "Godspelized" - 8:29
5. "Sentient Compassion" - 8:21
6. "Tenderly" (Walter Gross, Jack Lawrence) - 9:16
7. "Angel Eyes" (Matt Dennis, Earl Brent) - 15:29

== Personnel ==
- David S. Ware - tenor saxophone
- Matthew Shipp - piano
- William Parker - bass
- Guillermo E. Brown - drums
