= Shakti (David S. Ware album) =

Studio album by David S. Ware
- Released: January 27, 2009
- Recorded: May 9, 2008; Systems Two Studio, Brooklyn, NY
- Genre: Jazz
- Length: 69:53
- Label: AUM Fidelity; AUM 052
- Producer: Steven Joerg & David S. Ware

David S. Ware chronology
Live in Vilnius (2007)	Shakti (2009)	Saturnian (2009)

Shakti is an album by saxophonist David S. Ware which was recorded in 2008 and released on the AUM Fidelity label. This was the first album Ware recorded after the breakup of the quartet that had been his main band for over 20 years.

== Reception ==
Professional ratings
Review scores
Source	Rating
AllMusic	4/5 stars
PopMatters	7/10 stars

In his review for AllMusic, Michael G. Nastos said "Those who enjoy the music of David S. Ware can easily relate to this excellent recording of his new music concept, backed by equally extraordinary players who perfectly understand his vision and purpose". PopMatters review stated "Shakti operates as a call to remind people of their deeper essences".

The All About Jazz review noted "A refreshingly lyrical and emotionally committed performance by masterful improvisers, Shakti ebbs with soulful intensity and inspired interplay, making this one of the most compelling, yet accessible, recordings of Ware's career". The JazzTimes review by Steve Greenlee commented "Ware’s old storminess helped him produce some of free jazz’s finest works. Shakti is no less fascinating. But it is a new direction for Ware, one that promises to be equally fulfilling".

== Track listing ==
All compositions by David S. Ware

1. "Crossing Samsara" - 9:39
2. "Nataraj" - 18:10
3. "Reflection" - 12:38
4. "Namah" - 8:27
5. "Antidromic" - 9:26
6. "Shakti" - 9:33

== Personnel ==
- David S. Ware – tenor saxophone, kalimba
- Joe Morris – guitar, percussion
- William Parker – bass
- Warren Smith – drums, percussion
