= Live in New York, 2010 =

Live album by The David S. Ware Trio
- Released: 2017
- Recorded: October 4, 2010
- Venues: Blue Note Jazz Club, New York City
- Genre: Free jazz
- Length: 2:09:28
- Labels: AUM Fidelity; AUM 102/103
- Producer: Steven Joerg

David S. Ware chronology
| Live in Sant'Anna Arresi, 2004 (2016) | Live in New York, 2010 (2017) |

Live in New York, 2010 is a live album by the David S. Ware Trio, featuring Ware on stritch and tenor saxophone, William Parker on bass, and Warren Smith on drums. It was recorded in October 2010 at the Blue Note Jazz Club in New York City, and was released as a double CD by AUM Fidelity in 2017.

The album was recorded the year following Ware's kidney transplant, and about two years before his death.

== Reception ==
Professional ratings
Review scores
| Source | Rating |
|---|---|
| All About Jazz | 5/5 stars |
| The Free Jazz Collective | 4.5/5 stars |

In a review for All About Jazz, Jakob Baekgaard awarded the album a full 5 stars, calling it "not just a concert, but a journey," and stating that Ware "flew into somewhere else and brought diamonds back from heaven."

Paul Acquaro of Jazz Times described the album as "more than two hours of molten, visceral, spontaneous improvisation," and wrote: "until the end Ware's playing bore an unmistakable faith in the healing power of music."

Critic Tom Hull included the album in a list titled "The Best Jazz Albums of 2017," and commented: "it's worth noting that [Ware]'s in remarkable form here... especially when William Parker (bass) and Warren Smith (drums) help out."

Stereogum's Phil Freeman remarked: "The overwhelming feel of the set is one of intimacy; the bluster and roar of the quartet is gone, replaced by meditative introspection. This is a fantastic performance, absolutely worth hearing."

Regarding Ware's performance on stritch, Chris Robinson of Point of Departure wrote: "One gets the feeling he is exploring what the smaller horn can do and what it allows him to say that the tenor may not." However, he noted that when Ware switches to tenor saxophone, "his performance really hits home. That big, enveloping, rich tone, and the way his sound somehow merges with and becomes one with his line... continues to captivate me."

== Track listings ==
=== Disc 1 ===
1. "1-A" – 15:21
2. "1-B" – 14:27
3. "1-C" – 6:42
4. "2-A" – 17:20
5. "2-B" – 9:04

=== Disc 2 ===
1. "3" – 14:47
2. "4-A" – 14:40
3. "4-B" – 3:58
4. "4-C" – 5:25
5. "5" – 10:31
6. "6-A" – 8:38
7. "6-B" – 8:43

== Personnel ==
- David S. Ware – stritch, tenor saxophone
- William Parker – bass
- Warren Smith – drums
