= Grass Roots (Grass Roots album) =

Studio album by Grass Roots
- Released: 2012
- Recorded: August 26, 2011
- Studio: Systems Two, Brooklyn
- Genre: Jazz
- Length: 58:54
- Label: AUM Fidelity
- Producer: Grass Roots, Steven Joerg

Darius Jones chronology
Book of Mæ'bul (Another Kind of Sunrise) (2012)	Grass Roots (2012)	Lung (2013)

Grass Roots is the debut album by the free jazz collective quartet consisting of Sean Conly on bass, Alex Harding on baritone sax, Darius Jones on alto sax and Chad Taylor on drums. It was recorded in 2011 and released on the AUM Fidelity label.

== Reception ==
Professional ratings
Review scores
Source	Rating
Down Beat	3.5/5 stars

The Down Beat review by Joe Tangari says "The opening minute of Grass Roots is one of the most inviting and warmly joyful introductions I’ve ever heard to an album that deals mostly in free playing."

The All About Jazz review by Mark F. Turner describes the album as "the exceptional debut by a newly formed collective who sound like they've been playing together for decades."

In his review for JazzTimes Mike Shanley notes that "All four of these musicians are involved in several different projects, but hopefully they’ll have opportunities to give this one the priority it deserves."

The Exclaim! review by Bryon Hayes states "A shared ecstasy shines forth in each second of this recording — these guys literally enjoy making music together and demonstrate such a powerful idea through the sounds they produce. What an amazing thing to celebrate."

The Point of Departure review by Troy Collins notes that "Together these four sublimate ego for mutual ideology; each contributes to the writing process, with obvious consideration paid towards maintaining a unified group sound.. Grass Roots conveys the egalitarian nature behind its name with infectious enthusiasm."

== Track listing ==
1. "Hotttness" (Darius Jones) – 8:01
2. "Lovelorn" (Darius Jones) – 9:16
3. "Ricochet" (Grass Roots) – 3:51
4. "Schnibbett" (Sean Conly) – 11:50
5. "Flight AZ 1754" (Alex Harding) – 6:39
6. "Whatiss" (Chad Taylor) – 10:45
7. "Hovering Above'" (Grass Roots) – 8:32

== Personnel ==
- Sean Conly – double bass
- Alex Harding - baritone saxophone
- Darius Jones - alto saxophone
- Chad Taylor – drums
