= Cooper-Moore =

Musical artist (born 1946)

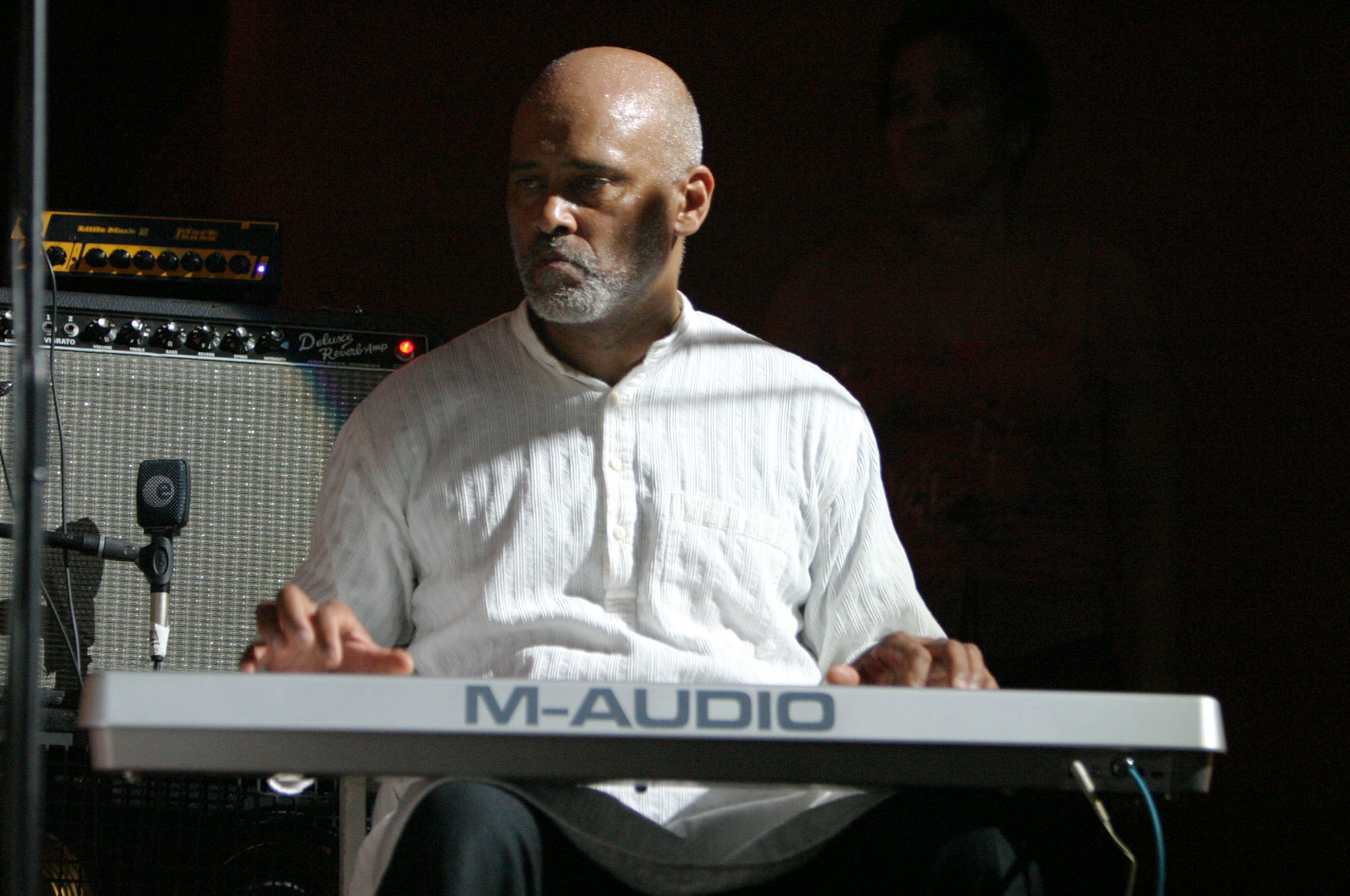
- Photo by Kate Glicksberg

Background information
- Born: Gene Y. Ashton; August 31, 1946 (age 80); Loudoun County, Virginia, U.S.
- Genres: Free jazz Improvisational music
- Instruments: piano, organ, horizontal hoe-handle harp, flute, fife, percussion, ashimba, twanger, three stringed fretless banjo, diddley-bow, mouthbow, TeZe
- Website: https://coopermooremusic.com/home

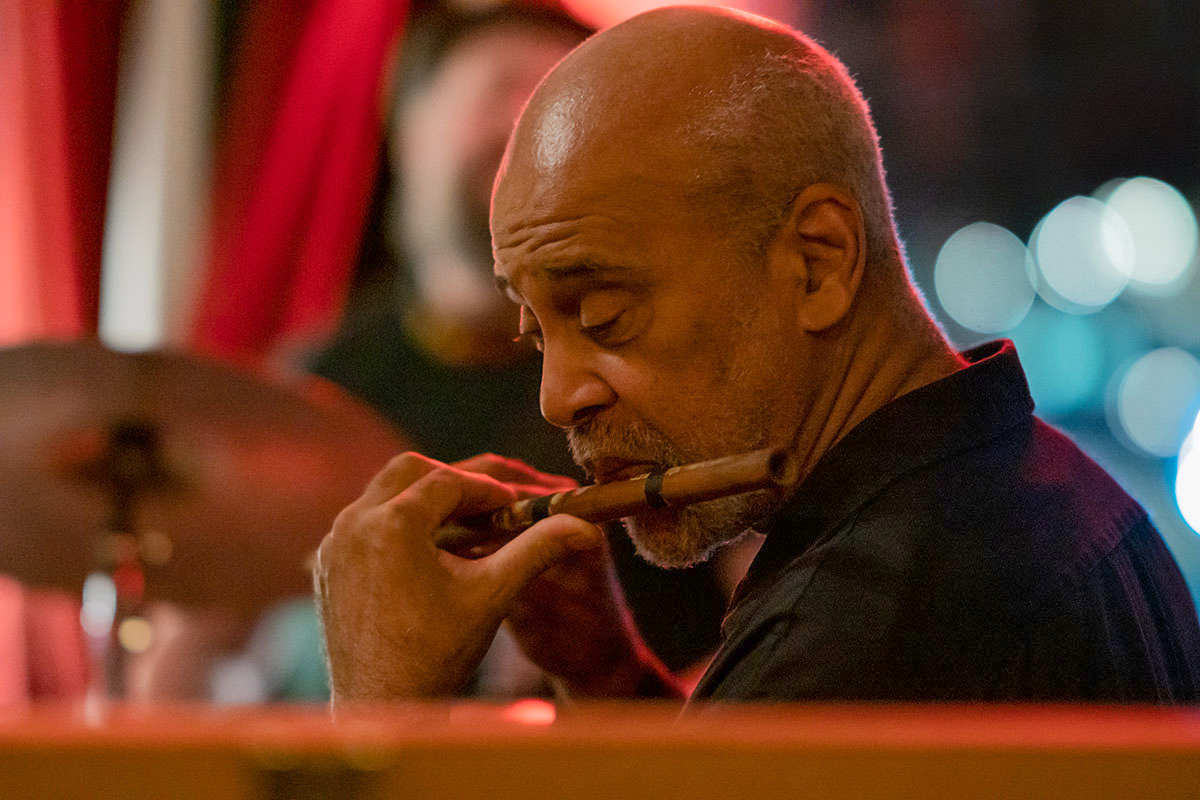
Aarhus (Denmark 2023)

Cooper-Moore (born Gene Y. Ashton; August 31, 1946) is an American jazz pianist, composer and instrument builder/designer based in New York City.

== Early life ==
At age 12, Cooper-Moore was recruited by community leaders to be the piano player for the town, and soon thereafter performed at church services and community functions. This is also the age when he heard musicians such as Ahmad Jamal and Charles Mingus, and was inspired to pursue jazz. He has cited pianist Jaki Byard's contributions to Mingus' band as a particular inspiration.

He moved to Boston in 1967 to briefly attend Berklee College of Music. In Boston he connected with many musicians, some of whom became longtime collaborators, notably saxophonist David S. Ware, drummer Marc Edwards, Cleve Pozar, and Juma Santos. In 1970, he formed a collective trio, Apogee, with Ware and Edwards.

== Career ==
In 1973, the trio of Cooper-Moore, David S. Ware, and Marc Edwards moved to New York City and established a living and performance space at 501 Canal Street, which served as a home base for musicians including Ware, Alan Michael Braufman, Jimmy Hopps, Tom Bruno, and Ellen Christi. Cooper-Moore's first commercial recording appearance was on Braufman's Valley of Search LP, released by India Navigation. Encouraged by Jimmy Hopps, Cooper-Moore began to design and build instruments, beginning with an ashimba, an 11-note xylophone made from discarded wood.

In 1975, he returned to Virginia with his family. There he worked with bands from a variety of genres, continued to further develop an array of handmade instruments, and worked as an educator with the Head Start program. Upon his return to New York City in 1985, he changed his name to Cooper-Moore, derived from the surnames of his grandmothers.

Cooper-Moore has performed and recorded with William Parker's In Order to Survive and Little Huey Creative Music Orchestra and Bill Cole's Untempered Ensemble. He established, recorded, and toured with Triptych Myth, a piano trio with Tom Abbs and Chad Taylor. He has recorded and toured extensively with Digital Primitives, a trio with Chad Taylor and Assif Tsahar. He has also collaborated with Daniel Carter in Parker's Organic Trio. He performs solo on piano and handcrafted instruments, with the Cooper-Moore Trio with Brian Price and Pascal Niggenkemper, and in Gerald Cleaver's Black Host.

He has performed at the Whitney Museum of American Art, in a piano duo with John Blum in 1996, and a solo performance in conjunction with the Blues for Smoke exhibit in 2013.

Outside of the jazz world, he has composed music for theater, including Rita Dove's "The Darker Side of the Earth" at the Guthrie Theater, "Feathers at the Flame" by Laurie Carlos at The Kitchen, and "A Still Life" by Emily Mann. He has worked with dance troupes such as the Joan Miller Dance Players, Rod Rogers Dance Company, Marlies Yearby's Movin' Spirits Dance Theater, Koo Dance, and Judith Jackson. He has scored and composed music for movies, including Central Park: The People's Place and Fireflies in the Abyss. He has worked with lyricists such as Laurie Carlos, Fred L. Price, Carl Hancock Rux, and Arthur T. Wilson. In the 1990s he was the resident storyteller at Prospect Park in Brooklyn.

He has toured extensively in Europe as well as the United States. Among the many instruments Cooper-Moore has built are a diddley-bow, a three-string fretless banjo, and a mouth bow.

Cooper-Moore received the Lifetime Achievement award at the 2017 Vision Festival in New York City.

Cooper-Moore has said, "I have taken stuff out a dumpster to make an instrument which I have used at gigs. If you put me somewhere, and I had to play and didn't have an instrument, I'd get everything I needed and make an instrument within a few hours."

== Discography ==
- Solo: Deep in the Neighborhood of History and Influence (Hopscotch, 2001)
- Cooper-Moore, Assif Tsahar - America (Hopscotch, 2003)
- Cooper-Moore - s/t 5x7" box (50 Miles of Elbow Room, 2004); reissued as The Cedar Box Recordings (50 Miles of Elbow Room / AUM Fidelity, 2008)
- Cooper-Moore / Tom Abbs / Chad Taylor - Triptych Myth (Hopscotch, 2004)
- Outtakes 1978 (Hopscotch, 2005)
- Triptych Myth - The Beautiful (AUM Fidelity, 2005)
- Cooper-Moore / Assif Tsahar - Tells Untold (Hopscotch, 2005)
- Assif Tsahar / Cooper-Moore / Hamid Drake - Lost Brother (Hopscotch, 2005)
- Digital Primitives - s/t (Hopscotch, 2007)
- Digital Primitives - Hum Crackle & Pop (Hopscotch, 2009)
- Digital Primitives - Lipsomuch / Soul Searchin' (Hopscotch)
- Cooper-Moore - Solo Piano #2 (self-released CD-R, 2017)
- Cooper-Moore - Looking Back #1 (self-released CD-R, 2017)
- Cooper-Moore - Looking Back #2 (self-released CD-R, 2017)

With Alan Braufman

- Valley of Search (India Navigation, 1975)
- The Fire Still Burns (Valley of Search, 2020)

With Gerald Cleaver's Black Host

- Life in the Sugar Candle Mines (Northern Spy Records, 2013)

With Bill Cole / The Untempered Ensemble

- Live in Greenfield, Massachusetts, November 20, 1999 (Boxholder, 2000)
- Seasoning the Greens (Boxholder, 2002)
- Duets and Solos, Volume 1 (Boxholder)

With Susie Ibarra

- Radiance (Hopscotch, 1999)
- Flower After Flower (Tzadik Records, 2000)

With Darius Jones

- Man'ish Boy (A Raw & Beautiful Thing) (AUM Fidelity, 2009)

With William Parker

- In Order to Survive (Black Saint Records, 1995)
- Compassion Seizes Bed-Stuy (Homestead Records, 1996)
- Sunrise in the Tone World (AUM Fidelity, 1997)
- Mass for the Healing of the World (Black Saint Records, 1998 [2003])
- The Peach Orchard (AUM Fidelity, 1998)
- Posium Pendasem (FMP, 1999)
- Mayor of Punkville (AUM Fidelity, 2000)
- Uncle Joe's Spirit House (Centering, 2010)
- Wood Flute Songs (AUM Fidelity, 2013)
- For Those Who Are, Still (AUM Fidelity, 2015)
- Stan's Hat Flapping in the Wind (Centering, 2016)
- Meditation / Resurrection (AUM Fidelity, 2017)
- Live / Shapeshifter (AUM Fidelity, 2019)
- The Music of William Parker: Migration of Silence Into and Out of the Tone World (Volumes 1–10) (AUM Fidelity, 2021)
- Heart Trio (AUM Fidelity, 2024) with Hamid Drake

With Brandon Seabrook

- Exultations (Astral Spirits)
- In the Swarm (Astral Spirits)

With Steve Swell

- This Now! (Cadence Jazz Records, 2003)

With David S. Ware

- Birth of a Being (Hat Art, 1979)
- Planetary Unknown (AUM Fidelity, 2011)
- David S. Ware / Cooper-Moore / William Parker / Muhammad Ali - Planetary Unknown: Live at Jazzfestival Saalfelden 2011 (AUM Fidelity, 2012)
- Birth Of A Being [Expanded] (AUM Fidelity, 2015)

With Stephen Gauci

- Studio Sessions Vol. 1 (GauciMusic)
- Conversations Vol. 1 (577 Records)
- Conversations Vol. 2 (577 Records)

With George Carver

- George Carver - The Modern Agriculture - God the Mother (Shrub Music)

With Eric Siegel

- Engine, Shriek, and a Bell (1999)
