= Renunciation (album) =

Live album by David S. Ware
- Released: 2007
- Recorded: June 18, 2006
- Venues: Angel Orensanz Center, New York City
- Genre: Jazz
- Length: 63:00
- Label: AUM Fidelity
- Producers: Steven Joerg, David S. Ware

David S. Ware chronology
BalladWare (2006)	Renunciation (2007)	Live in Vilnius (2009)

Renunciation is an album by American jazz saxophonist David S. Ware, which was recorded live at the 2006 Vision Festival and released on the AUM Fidelity label. It was the last U.S. performance by the David S. Ware Quartet.

== Reception ==
Professional ratings
Review scores
Source	Rating
AllMusic	4/5 stars
The Penguin Guide to Jazz	4/4 stars

In his review for AllMusic, Thom Jurek states "Renunciation is the sound of a band who has been playing together for a very long time and who knows and understands the value of everything, from circular rhythm and mantra-like compositional structures to the extended gift of free improvisation within their own definition of the time/space continuum."

The Penguin Guide to Jazz says "This live recording ranks among Ware's best works and confirms that for all the 'avant-garde' procedures, far-flung dissonance and out-of-line metres, his most distinctive work emerges, like Coltrane, directly out of the blues, church music and song."

The All About Jazz review by Matthew Sumera says "Renunciation, billed as the last incarnation of the David S. Ware quartet, feels less like an immense, concluding, culminating statement than one may hope."

In a review for JazzTimes Chris Kelsey notes "As is usual with this group, the most satisfying moments occur when Ware plays to his sidemen’s strengths."

The Point of Departure review by Bill Shoemaker states "Billed as their farewell US concert, the David S. Ware Quartet’s 2006 Vision Festival performance did not simply signal the end of an illustrious ensemble, but an episode, if not an era in jazz history."

== Track listing ==
All compositions by David S. Ware

1. "Introduction" - 1:51
2. "Ganesh Sound" - 8:32
3. "Renunciation Suite I" - 18:50
4. "Renunciation Suite II" - 6:45
5. "Renunciation Suite III" - 7:22
6. "Mikuro's Blues" - 9:16
7. "Ganesh Sound (reprise)" - 6:40
8. "Saturnian" - 3:44

== Personnel ==
- David S. Ware – tenor saxophone
- Matthew Shipp – piano
- William Parker – bass
- Guillermo E. Brown – drums
