= Live in Vilnius =

Live album by David S. Ware
- Released: 2009
- Recorded: March 24, 2007
- Venue: Lithuanian Russian Drama Theatre, Vilnius
- Genre: Jazz
- Length: 85:04
- Label: NoBusiness

David S. Ware chronology
| Renunciation (2007) | Live in Vilnius (2009) | Shakti (2009) |

Live in Vilnius is an album by American jazz saxophonist David S. Ware, which was recorded in 2007 and released as a double limited edition LP on the Lithuanian NoBusiness label. It was the last recorded work by the David S. Ware Quartet.

== Reception ==
Professional ratings
Review scores
| Source | Rating |
|---|---|
| The Free Jazz Collective | 5/5 stars |

The All About Jazz review by Clifford Allen states "In an age where all-star lineups, unique projects and sideman gigs are extraordinarily common, it's refreshing (if not downright jaw-dropping) to see a band that lasted nearly twenty years playing this music. Live in Vilnius is a fitting document to close out their run, and while not any more or less a jewel than the other 17 releases, it's an excellent final chapter."

A reviewer for The Free Jazz Collective wrote: "I'm sure you've experienced music that blows your socks off when you first hear it, and then you listen to it again and again, and it gets better all the time. This double vinyl album is like that."

== Track listing ==
All compositions by David S. Ware except as indicated

Side A

1. "Ganesh Sound" – 17:25

Side B

2. "Theme of Ages" – 15:46
3. "Mikuro's Blues" – 6:15

Side C

4. "The Stargazers" (Sun Ra) – 22:15

Side D

5. "The Stargazers" (continues) (Sun Ra) – 4:45
6. "Lithuanian Whirl" – 11:20
7. "Surrendered" – 7:18

== Personnel ==
- David S. Ware – tenor saxophone
- Matthew Shipp – piano
- William Parker – bass
- Guillermo E. Brown – drums
