= Mass for the Healing of the World =

Live album by William Parker & the Little Huey Creative Music Orchestra
- Released: August 31, 2003
- Recorded: May 31, 1998; Teatro Nuovo in Verona, Italy
- Genre: Jazz
- Label: Black Saint; 120179-2
- Producer: William Parker

William Parker chronology
Lifting the Sanctions (1997)	Mass for the Healing of the World (2003)	Zen Mountains/Zen Streets (1998)

Mass for the Healing of the World is a live album by American jazz double bassist William Parker & the Little Huey Creative Music Orchestra which was recorded live in 1998 but not released on the Italian Black Saint label until 2003.

== Reception ==
Professional ratings
Review scores
Source	Rating
The Penguin Guide to Jazz Recordings	3/4 stars

In his review for All About Jazz, Rex Butters states "One wonders how many recorded Little Huey performances languish in the can. This one documents a night six years ago that is both timeless and a time capsule. Like all Little Huey projects, all manner of musics emanate from the assembled musicians, all the musics tinted blue".

== Track listing ==
All compositions by William Parker

1. Invocation – 0:30
2. "First Reading (Dawn Song)" – 13:22
3. "Hallelujah" – 8:46
4. "Mysticism" – 5:44
5. "Response (Muezzin's Call)" – 13:00
6. "Second Reading (Cathedral in the Mountains)" – 6:55
7. "Willows (Can You Give Me Back My Life)" – 8:36
8. "Cantos (Love God)" – 13:55

== Personnel ==
- William Parker – bass, pocket cornet
- Roy Campbell, Jr., Lewis Barnes, Richard Rodriguez – trumpet
- Alex Lodico, Masahiko Kono – trombone
- Dave Hofstra – tuba
- Assif Tsahar – tenor sax, bass clarinet
- Darryl Foster – soprano sax, tenor saxophone
- Rob Brown, Marco Eneidi – alto sax
- Chris Jonas – soprano sax
- Dave Sewelson – baritone sax
- Cooper-Moore – piano
- Susie Ibarra – drums, timpani
- Aleta Heyes – vocals
