= Revelation (Hugh Ragin album) =

Studio album by Hugh Ragin
- Released: 2004
- Recorded: September 2, 2003
- Studio: G Spot Studios, Brooklyn, New York
- Genre: Free jazz
- Length: 1:04:57
- Label: Justin Time; JTR 8502-2
- Producer: Assif Tsahar, Hugh Ragin

Hugh Ragin chronology
Sound Pictures for Solo Trumpet (2002)	Revelation (2004)

Revelation is an album by trumpeter Hugh Ragin. It was recorded on September 2, 2003, at G Spot Studios in Brooklyn, New York, and was released in 2004 by Justin Time Records. On the album, Ragin is joined by saxophonist Assif Tsahar, bassist William Parker, and drummer Hamid Drake.

== Reception ==
Professional ratings
Review scores
Source	Rating
AllMusic	4/5 stars
The Penguin Guide to Jazz	3.5/4 stars
All About Jazz	3/5 stars
All About Jazz	3/5 stars
All About Jazz	4/5 stars

In a review for AllMusic, Stewart Mason wrote: "These nine composed pieces are handled with the complete self-assurance of seasoned improvisers, giving Revelation the combination of structure and flexibility that the best free jazz offers."

The authors of The Penguin Guide to Jazz Recordings stated: "Revelation is, aside from the admittedly more specialist solo trumpet album, Ragin's most successful recording to date." They compared the ensemble makeup to that of the classic Ornette Coleman quartet, but concluded: "so Ornette-like, but nowadays Ragin speaks in a voice all his own."

David R. Adler of JazzTimes commented: "the quartet splits the difference between hard-swinging free-bop and a more abstract, almost chamber-jazz aesthetic... Parker and Drake... lend Ragin's music a certain precision amid all the free play."

Writing for All About Jazz Jim Santella remarked: "Ragin retains the tradition of jazz history while forging ahead in an avant-garde direction... Together, the four artists create dissonance and unleash their powerful energy freely." AAJ's John Kelman called the album "an intriguing combination of the jazz tradition with European art house music," and wrote: "fans of the Art Ensemble of Chicago and Albert Ayler's work will find much to like about Ragin's concept." Another AAJ reviewer stated: "these rich, full-bodied statements come straight from the heart and don't lose track of the music's organic roots."

Peter Margasak of the Chicago Reader described the album as "a deeply satisfying inside-out quartet recording propelled by the elastic rhythm section of bassist William Parker and drummer Hamid Drake."

== Track listing ==
Composed by Hugh Ragin.

1. "Restoration Intensive" – 8:23
2. "Kamal's Gift" – 8:44
3. "Revelation" – 14:50
4. "The Battlefield" – 7:22
5. "Skull Hill" – 5:18
6. "Night Life" – 6:42
7. "Wormwood" – 5:55
8. "Speak to the Mountain" – 4:51
9. "Next Time" – 2:20

== Personnel ==
- Hugh Ragin – trumpet, piccolo trumpet, pocket trumpet
- Assif Tsahar – tenor saxophone, bass clarinet, musette
- William Parker – bass, musette, pocket trumpet
- Hamid Drake – drums, percussion
