= Live in the World =

Live album by The David S. Ware Quartets
- Released: February 22, 2005
- Recorded: 1998 and 2003
- Venue: Chiasso, Switzerland (1998); Terni, Italy (2003); Milano, Italy (2003)
- Genre: Free jazz
- Length: 3:45:52
- Label: Thirsty Ear; THI57153.2

David S. Ware chronology
Threads (2003)	Live in the World (2005)	BalladWare (2006)

Live in the World is a live album by the David S. Ware Quartets. Six tracks were recorded in Switzerland in 1998, and feature Ware on saxophone, Matthew Shipp on piano, William Parker on bass, and Susie Ibarra on drums. The remaining tracks were recorded in two locations during 2003: Terni, Italy, with Ware, Shipp, Parker and drummer Hamid Drake; and Milano, Italy, with Drake replaced by Guillermo E. Brown. The album was released as a triple CD set by Thirsty Ear Recordings on February 22, 2005.

== Reception ==
Professional ratings
Review scores
Source	Rating
AllMusic	4.5/5 stars
The Penguin Guide to Jazz	4/4 stars
All About Jazz	5/5 stars
The Guardian	4/5 stars
PopMatters	8/10 stars
Robert Christgau	A−
The Absolute Sound	4.5/5 stars

In a review for AllMusic, Steve Loewy called the album "glorious," and wrote: "This set is destined to be a mini-classic, and a critical addition to the discography of David S. Ware."

The authors of The Penguin Guide to Jazz Recordings awarded the album a full 4 stars, and stated: "The title can be read two ways, as a straightforward description of these live dates..., but also as injunction not to overlook the near-at-hand. For all his mysticism Ware is profoundly committed to the basic mechanics of the music."

A reviewer for All About Jazz commented: "Ware's playing draws broadly from the free jazz tradition, but it steers mercifully clear of the clinical approach adopted by many European improvisers. His compositions seem designed from the outset to match the strengths of his bandmates, who treat the canvas of sound as something to stretch, warp, and remold in the spirit of the moment, capturing an organic, ephemeral glow." He concluded: "Ecstasy, indeed."

The Guardian's John Fordham remarked: "the commitment, energy and skill are occasionally exhausting, often dazzling."

Writing for PopMatters, John Kenyon stated: "these live reinterpretations of Ware's own compositions show the evolving creativity of his side players, while at the same time testifying to the skillful hand of their creator."

Robert Christgau praised the album's "organic integrity," calling it "chaos rendered beautiful," and wrote: "Ware's ideas flow nonstop. After all these years it's clear that he commands one of the great sounds in tenor sax history, very nearly on a par with Rollins, Coltrane, Webster--huge yet lyrical, and so loose."

In a review for the BBC, John Eyles commented: "This is currently top of my list of the year's best. A joyful noise; highly recommended."

Mark Saleski of Something Else!!!! called Ware "one of the most powerful and compelling saxophone voices of modern jazz," and remarked: "His sound has the 'air' of Sonny Rollins right alongside the spiritual howl of an Albert Ayler or even the great John Coltrane. While you can definitely hear Ware's reverence for the masters of jazz, he's not content to just revisit and polish the past."

The Big Takeover's Steve Holtje described the album as "amazingly compelling," and stated that it "offers a thrilling look back at different eras of this long-running group."

Writing for The Village Voice, Larry Blumenfeld called Ware's quartet "the most resilient, least heralded, best-sounding supergroup in modern jazz," and remarked: "A mountain of music—worth the climb for its glimpses of Ware's unencumbered bliss."

== Track listings ==
"The Way We Were" was composed by Barbra Streisand. "Freedom Suite" parts 1–4 were composed by Sonny Rollins. Remaining tracks were composed by David S. Ware.

=== Disc 1 ===
1. "Aquarian Sound" – 31:50
2. "Logistic" – 18:42
3. "The Way We Were" – 17:43
4. "Mikuro's Blues" – 9:05

=== Disc 2 ===
1. "Elder's Path" – 25:35
2. "Unknown Mansion" – 13:44
3. "Sentient Compassion" – 9:26
4. "Co Co Cana" – 12:09
5. "Manu's Ideal" – 6:12
6. "Lexicon" – 3:59

=== Disc 3 ===
1. "Freedom Suite: Part One" – 19:13
2. "Freedom Suite: Part Two" – 17:26
3. "Freedom Suite: Part Three" – 11:06
4. "Freedom Suite: Part Four" – 15:05
5. "Stargazer" – 14:37

Disc 1, disc 2 track 6, and disc 3 track 5 were recorded in Chiasso, Switzerland on December 11, 1998. Disc 2, tracks 1–5 were recorded in Terni, Italy in 2003. Disc 3, tracks 1–4 were recorded in Milano, Italy in 2003.

== Personnel ==
- David S. Ware – saxophone
- Matthew Shipp – piano
- William Parker – bass
- Susie Ibarra – drums (disc 1; disc 2, track 6; disc 3, track 5)
- Guillermo E. Brown – drums (disc 2, tracks 1–5)
- Hamid Drake – drums (disc 3, tracks 1–4)
