= Threads (David S. Ware album) =

Studio album by David S. Ware String Ensemble
- Released: September 23, 2003
- Recorded: April 28 & June 13, 2003; Sorcerer Sound, NYC
- Genre: Jazz
- Length: 44:45
- Label: Thirsty Ear; THI57137.2
- Producer: David S. Ware, Matthew Shipp & Peter Gordon

David S. Ware chronology
Freedom Suite (2002)	Threads (2003)	Live in the World (2005)

Threads is an album by saxophonist and composer David S. Ware's String Ensemble which was recorded in 2003 and released on the Thirsty Ear label.

== Reception ==
Professional ratings
Review scores
Source	Rating
AllMusic	4.5/5 stars
The Guardian	3/5 stars
The Penguin Guide to Jazz Recordings	3.5/4 stars

In his review for AllMusic, Thom Jurek states "Threads is easily Ware's classic thus far in that it showcases the musician at the height of all of his powers: improvisational, compositional, and as an arranger and bandleader. This is Ware's masterpiece and the first really new compositional statement in jazz in years" The Guardian's John Fordham stated "Some fascinating free-improv, often against startlingly tender and conventionally-harmonised textures, though unlikely to suit a Friday night at Ronnie's".

PopMatters observed "if Threads won’t immediately make Ware as well known as a composer as he is as a player, it definitely serves as a loud call that his skills don’t end with his saxophone". The All About Jazz review said "While some may question this seemingly off-kilter group of selections, it seems that Ware is once again searching for some new musical plane that may be unknown but definitely makes the journey interesting". JazzTimes noted "It's hard not to think of Ware as a guest star on Threads, at least on first listen. However the music's power ends up taking over, making the album likely to become one of the most significant offerings in the saxophonist's career".

== Track listing ==
All compositions by David S. Ware except as indicated

1. "Ananda Rotation" (Matthew Shipp, Ware) - 6:39
2. "Sufic Passages" - 9:02
3. "Weave Part 1" (Guillermo E. Brown, Ware) - 3:21
4. "Threads" - 13:00
5. "Carousel of Lightness" - 9:02
6. "Weave Part 2" (Brown, Ware) - 3:41

== Personnel ==
- David S. Ware - tenor saxophone
- Matthew Shipp - piano, Korg Triton
- Daniel Bernard Roumain - violin
- Mat Maneri - viola
- William Parker - bass
- Guillermo E. Brown - drums
