= Orbit (Rob Brown, Guerino Mazzola and Heinz Geisser album) =

Studio album by Rob Brown, Guerino Mazzola, Heinz Geisser
- Released: 1997
- Recorded: October 19 & 20, 1996
- Studio: The Studio, New York City
- Genre: Jazz
- Length: 71:04
- Label: Music & Arts
- Producer: Heinz Geisser, Guerino Mazzola

Rob Brown chronology
Blink of an Eye (1997)	Orbit (1997)	Scratching the Surface (1998)

Orbit is a collaborative album by American jazz saxophonist Rob Brown and the Swiss duo composed of pianist Guerino Mazzola and percussionist Heinz Geisser. It was recorded in 1996 and released on the Music & Arts label. Mazzola and Geisser worked together since 1994, before this album they played as a trio of similar instrumentation with Swiss saxophonist Mathias Rissi instead of Brown.

== Reception ==
In his review for AllMusic, Scott Yanow states "This is a set that grows in interest with each listen but falls short of being essential despite the obvious talents of the musicians."

== Track listing ==
All compositions by Geisser/Mazzola

1. "Boarding" – 4:02
2. "Vision One" – 3:59
3. "Vision Two" – 14:36
4. "Vision Five" – 3:03
5. "Superclusters" – 20:05
6. "Bela's Dream" – 7:49
7. "Bungy Jump" – 17:30

== Personnel ==
- Rob Brown – alto sax, flute
- Guerino Mazzola – piano
- Heinz Geisser – percussion
