= Warren Smith =

Warren Smith may refer to:

== Music ==
- Warren Smith (jazz trombonist) (1908–1975), American trombonist
- Warren Smith (percussionist) (born 1934), American jazz percussionist
- Warren Smith (singer) (1932–1980), American rockabilly singer

== Sports ==
- Warren Smith (guard) (1896–1965), American football player
- Warren Smith (quarterback) (born 1990), American football quarterback
- Warren Smith (cricketer) (born 1941), Australian cricketer
- Warren Smith (golfer) (1915–2015), golf professional, Cherry Hills Country Club
- Warren Cummings Smith (born 1992), American-Estonian alpine skier
- Warren Smith (broadcaster), Australian television sports announcer with Fox Sports News Australia
- Warren W. Smith, American football player and coach

== Other ==
- Warren Allen Smith (1921–2017), American gay activist
- Clip Smith (Warren Smith, 1941–2004), American radio and television announcer
- Warren Billy Smith (1931–2003), paranormal writer
- Warren Brierley Smith, Christian author, goes by "Warren B. Smith"
- Warren J. Smith (1922–2008), president of the Optical Society of America, 1980
- Warren R. Smith (1889–1957), American politician
- Warren Cole Smith (born 1958), American author and journalist who is the president and editor-in-chief at MinistryWatch
