= Onecept =

Studio album by David S. Ware
- Released: September 14, 2010
- Recorded: December 2, 2009; Systems Two Studio, Brooklyn, NY
- Genre: Jazz
- Length: 65:34
- Label: AUM Fidelity; AUM 064
- Producer: Steven Joerg & David S. Ware

David S. Ware chronology
Saturnian (2010)	Onecept (2010)	Planetary Unknown (2011)

Onecept is an album by saxophonist David S. Ware which was recorded in 2009 and released on the AUM Fidelity label.

== Reception ==
Professional ratings
Review scores
Source	Rating
AllMusic	4/5 stars
PopMatters	7/10 stars

In his review for AllMusic, Thom Jurek said "Ware's development as a player is no longer reliant on his physicality -- though he still possesses it in abundance. Rather, it's his centering on that collective voice, which offers so many dimensions and textures to explore, where he expresses his creativity and mastery of his horns. Onecept is an exciting next step in Ware's musical evolution". PopMatters review stated "these nine songs are the rare glimpse of three jazz musicians lifting the sound way above their heads and pushing it through the ceiling. It’s almost a stretch to call it jazz. It’s just…music".

The All About Jazz review noted "Even after half a century playing the saxophone, for Ware the journey continues—and his cohorts are right there with him". The JazzTimes review by Michael J. West commented "David S. Ware could never be accused of following trends. If saxophone-led trios are all the rage, his release of a sax/bass/drums album feels coincidental. Either way, though, Onecept is among the best of that recent lot".

== Track listing ==
All compositions by David S. Ware

1. "Book of Krittika" - 7:53
2. "Wheel of Life" - 6:31
3. "Celestial" - 6:24
4. "Desire Worlds" - 6:56
5. "Astral Earth" - 14:54
6. "Savaka" - 4:35
7. "Bardo" - 6:43
8. "Anagami" - 6:50
9. "Vata" - 4:27
10. "Virtue" - 6:47 Bonus track on vinyl release
11. "Gnavah" - 9:06 Bonus track on vinyl release

== Personnel ==
- David S. Ware – tenor saxophone, stritch, saxello
- William Parker – bass
- Warren Smith – drums, timpani, percussion
