= Sunrise in the Tone World =

Live album by William Parker
- Released: 1997
- Recorded: January 15 & 29, February 19 & 26, 1995
- Venue: Knitting Factory, New York City
- Genre: Jazz
- Length: 121:41
- Label: AUM Fidelity
- Producer: William Parker, Steven Joerg

William Parker chronology
Compassion Seizes Bed-Stuy (1996)	Sunrise in the Tone World (1997)	Lifting the Sanctions (1997)

Sunrise in the Tone World is an album by American jazz double bassist William Parker, which was recorded live in 1995 and released on the AUM Fidelity label.

This is the second recording by William Parker & The Little Huey Creative Music Orchestra, a big band founded in January 1994. The ensemble takes its name from Huey Jackson, a fledgling poet who died before he turned 18. "Voice Dancer Kidd" is dedicated to Kidd Jordan. "Sunship for Dexter" is for Dexter Gordon. "The Painter and the Poet" is a duet between Marco Eneidi and Gregg Bendian.

== Reception ==
Professional ratings
Review scores
Source	Rating
AllMusic	4/5 stars
The Penguin Guide to Jazz	3/4 stars

In his review for AllMusic, Don Snowden states "The freewheeling 25-piece (plus guests) unit can be a lumbering behemoth, but one that's very nimble on its feet, and this strong two-CD set meets a prime goal of this music by taking the listener on a musical and emotional voyage."

The Penguin Guide to Jazz notes that "Their roots are in Trane's Ascension, in Mingus' sprawling big bands and in Sun Ra's Arkestra; but they also had strong affinities with Butch Morris' conducted improvisation and with Anthony Braxton mythic-realist fantasy pieces."

The JazzTimes review by Fred Bouchard states "This 20-piece ensemble develops a powerful synergy out of strong if inchoate ideas of a humanistic and creative revolution welling from the heart and bowels of Brooklyn."

== Track listing ==
All compositions by William Parker.

=== Disc one ===
1. "Sunrise in the Tone World" – 12:14
2. "The Bluest J" – 26:05
3. "Voice Dancer Kidd" – 7:44
4. "Mayan Space Station" – 14:10

=== Disc two ===
1. "Huey Sees Light Through a Leaf" – 40:10
2. "Sunship for Dexter" – 9:55
3. "And Again" – 5:40
4. "The Painter and the Poet" – 5:43

== Personnel ==
- William Parker – bass
- Roy Campbell – trumpet, pocket trumpet, flugelhorn
- Lewis Barnes – trumpet
- Richard Rodriguez – trumpet
- Alex Lodico – trombone
- Masahiko Kono – trombone
- Steve Swell – trombone
- Chris Jonas – soprano sax
- Darryl Foster – soprano sax
- Rob Brown – alto sax
- Will Connell – alto sax, bass clarinet, flute
- Mabo Suzuki – alto sax
- Marco Eneidi – alto sax
- Richard Keene – tenor sax
- Assif Tsahar – tenor sax
- Ben Koen – tenor sax
- Dave Swelson – baritone sax
- Joe Ruddick – baritone sax
- Gregg Bendian – vibes
- Cooper-Moore – piano
- Akira Ando – cello
- Hal Onserud – bass
- Dave Hofstra – tuba
- Susie Ibarra – drums

Special Guests:

- Lisa Sokolov – voice
- Vinny Golia – reeds
- Jason Hwang – violin
- John King – dobro
