= Society for Mathematics and Computation in Music =

- Formation: 2006
- President: Guerino Mazzola
- Website: www.smcm-net.info

The Society for Mathematics and Computation in Music (SMCM) was founded in 2006 as an International Forum for researchers and musicians working in the trans-disciplinary field at the intersection of music, mathematics and computation. The SMCM is registered in the USA. At its inaugural meeting in Berlin on May 20, 2007, 13 board members were elected. The board later elected the officers for the society.

== Officers ==
President: Guerino Mazzola, University of Minnesota

Vice President: Moreno Andreatta, IRCAM/CNRS, Paris

Treasurer: David Clampitt, Ohio State University

Secretary: Johanna Devaney, Ohio State University

== Past Officers ==
Treasurer (2007–2013): Ian Quinn, Yale University

Secretary (2007–2013): Elaine Chew, University of Southern California / Queen Mary University of London

== Conferences ==
The Society hosts a biennial meeting, the International Conference on Mathematics and Computation in Music (MCM).

- MCM 2007, National Institute for Music Research, Berlin, Germany, May 18–20, 2007
- MCM 2009, Yale University, New Haven, Connecticut, USA, June 19–22, 2009
- MCM 2011, IRCAM, Paris, France, June 15–17, 2011
- MCM 2013, McGill University Schulich School of Music and CIRMMT, Montreal, Canada, June 12–14, 2013
- MCM 2015, Queen Mary University of London, London, United Kingdom, June 22–25, 2015
- MCM 2017, MCM 2017, Universidad Nacional Autónoma di México (UNAM), Mexico City, Mexico, June 26–29, 2017

== Journals ==
SMCM's official journal is the Journal of Mathematics and Music.

== See also ==
- Music and mathematics
- List of music software
