= Testimony (William Parker album) =

Live album by William Parker
- Released: 1996
- Recorded: December 28, 1994
- Venue: Knitting Factory, New York City
- Genre: Free jazz
- Length: 1:17:58
- Label: Zero In; 1
- Producer: Derek Milner

William Parker chronology
| In Order to Survive (1995) | Testimony (1996) | Compassion Seizes Bed-Stuy (1996) |

Testimony is a live solo double bass album by William Parker, his first solo release. It was recorded on December 28, 1994, at the Knitting Factory in New York City, and was issued on CD in 1996 by the tiny Zero In label. The music was also included in the 2011 compilation Crumbling in the Shadows is Fraulein Miller's Stale Cake (Centering Records).

The track titled "Testimony" is dedicated to jazz double bassist Beb Guérin, while "Dedication" pays homage to Charles Clark and Albert Stinson.

== Reception ==
Professional ratings
Review scores
| Source | Rating |
|---|---|
| AllMusic | 2.5/5 stars |
| MusicHound Jazz | 3/5 stars |
| The Penguin Guide to Jazz | 3/4 stars |
| The Rolling Stone Jazz & Blues Album Guide | 4/5 stars |
| Tom Hull – on the Web | B+ |

In a review for AllMusic, Brian Flota praised Parker's "amazing emotional and experimental capabilities," but noted the "less than average production of the disc."

The authors of The Penguin Guide to Jazz Recordings wrote: "Solo contrabass performance is a stern discipline. Parker pays full tribute to Barre Phillips, and much of this live recording... recalls Barre's rich, balletic solo works."

Ed Hazell of The Boston Phoenix called the music "stunning," and stated: "Parker plunges in as if he were trying to save a sinner from the devil. From its opening moments, 'Sonic Animation' grabs you with alarming force as Parker wails and declaims with the fury of an Old Testament prophet... With his arsenal of rhetorical devices, speed, and facility on the bass -- and a dark, woody tone that projects honesty and strength -- Parker maintains a remarkable level of intensity for nearly 80 minutes."

The Chicago Reader's John Corbett described the album as "a splintering blindside attack of metal, wood, and bow hair," and commented: "'Sonic Animation' is 23 minutes of furious energy, all arco, while Parker's singular approach to pizzicato–accelerating phrases, string buzzing on the neck, multilinear riffs, and the constant thud of thwacked open notes–is evident on the title cut; moving into the finale, he sits on a single cool melodic line, smacking the bottom-end nastily between numerous repetitions."

== Track listing ==
Composed by William Parker.

1. "Sonic Animation" – 22:58
2. "Testimony" – 11:22
3. "Light #3" – 3:51
4. "Dedication" – 15:38
5. "The 2nd Set" – 24:09

== Personnel ==
- William Parker – double bass
