= Organica: Solo Saxophones, Volume 2 =

Organica

Live album by David S. Ware
- Released: 2011
- Recorded: March 13 & November 5, 2010
- Venue: The Bourbon Room, Park Slope, Brooklyn; Elastic Arts, Chicago
- Genre: Jazz
- Length: 77:30
- Label: AUM Fidelity
- Producer: Steven Joerg

David S. Ware chronology
| Planetary Unknown (2011) | Organica (2011) | Live at Jazzfestival Saalfelden 2011 (2012) |

Organica (subtitled Solo Saxophones, Volume 2) is a live solo album by American jazz saxophonist David S. Ware, which was recorded in 2010 and released on the AUM Fidelity label. The album includes two complete performances: the first was an invite-only event in Brooklyn and the second took place at the Umbrella Music Festival in Chicago. Ware plays tenor sax and for the first time in public sopranino sax.

== Reception ==
Professional ratings
Review scores
| Source | Rating |
|---|---|
| AllMusic | 4/5 stars |
| Down Beat | 4/5 stars |

In his review for AllMusic, Thom Jurek notes that "the full fruition of Ware's musical thought is displayed for the listener progressively, revealing his sense of innate logic, architecture, spiritual discipline, and instinct."

The Down Beat review by Shaun Brady states "Longtime listeners can rest assured that not only has Ware not been weakened by his recent illness, he has reached new heights of invention."

The All About Jazz review by Nic Jones says "There's always been authority in his saxophone playing, but with the passing of time the gravity of his work has become more apparent, as if every note he plays is now invested with the wealth of life's experiences."

== Track listing ==
All compositions by David S. Ware

1. "Minus Gravity 1" - 16:20
2. "Organica 1" - 24:31
3. "Minus Gravity 2" - 22:27
4. "Organica 2" - 14:12

== Personnel ==
- David S. Ware – sopranino sax (track 1 & 3), tenor sax (track 2 & 4)
