= Darius Jones (saxophonist) =

American jazz saxophonist (born 1978)

- Born: May 3, 1978 (age 47) Norfolk, Virginia, U.S.
- Genres: Jazz, avant-garde jazz, New Music, experimental
- Occupation(s): Composer, Alto saxophonist
- Instrument: Alto saxophone
- Years active: 2003–present
- Website: dariusjonesmusic.com

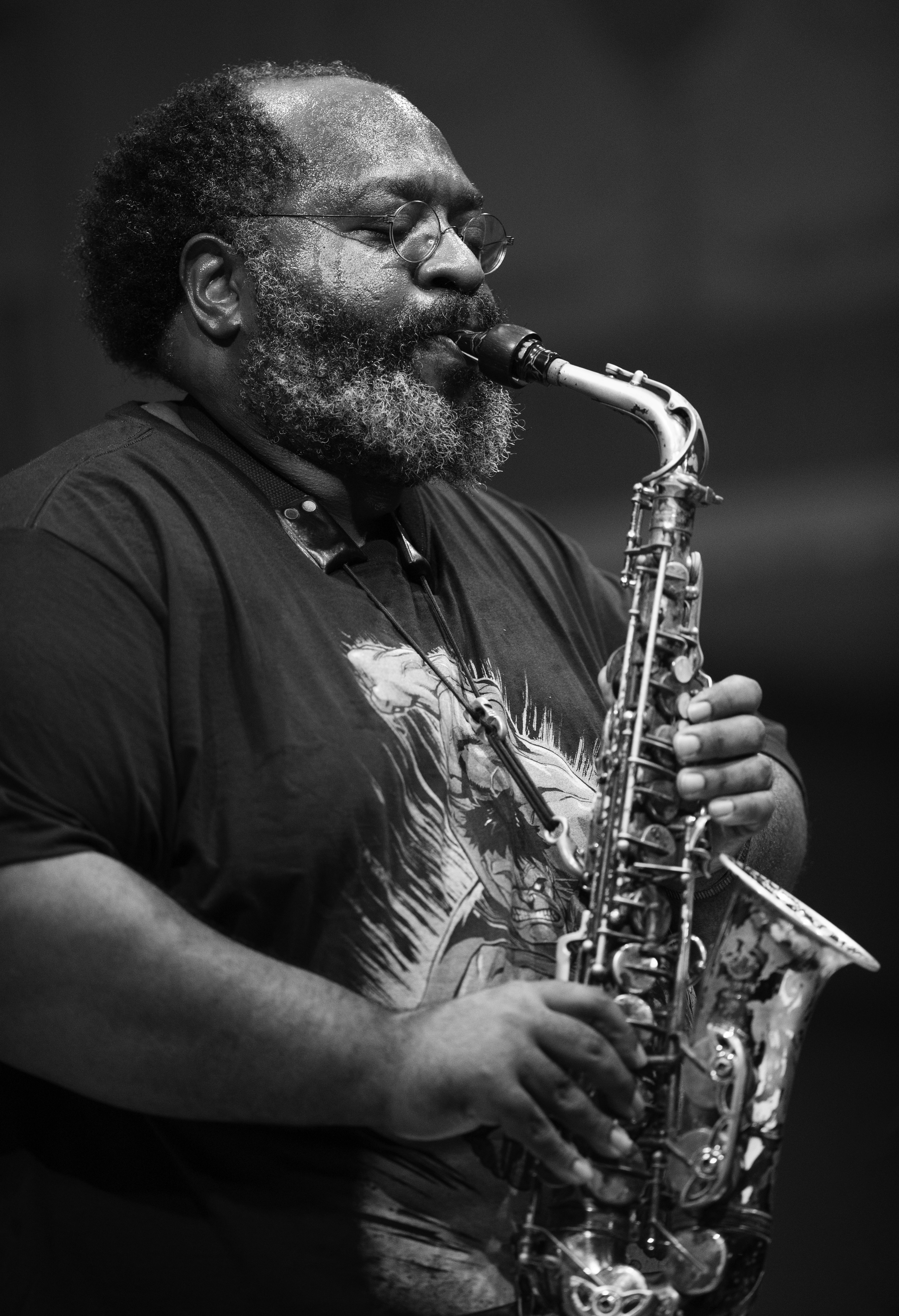
Darius Jones, Arts for Art - Vision Festival 2024. Photo by Marek Lazarski

Darius Jones (born May 3, 1978) is an American saxophonist, composer, and professor of African-American music.

Jones has been recognized for work ranging from solo saxophone to chamber and vocal ensembles, with musical interests including Black music, avant garde music, and experimental music. His compositions and recordings have been included in best-of lists in publications including NPR Music, The Wire, and PopMatters, and his live performances have been acknowledged as among the year's best in The New York Times.

In 2024, Jones was announced as incoming Assistant Professor of Music at Wesleyan University.

== Life and career ==
Jones was born in Virginia and graduated from Virginia Commonwealth University with a Bachelor of Music in Jazz Studies in 2003.

Jones moved to New York City in 2005. In 2008, he was awarded a Van Lier Fellowship and earned a Master of Arts in Jazz Performance/Composition from New York University. He received the French-American Jazz Exchange Award in 2013 and a Jerome Foundation Commission in 2014.

Jones taught saxophone and improvisation at Columbia University in 2017. The following year, Jones received a Harvard University Fromm Music Foundation commission and joined the faculty at The New School, where he taught in the College of Performing Arts and Contemporary Music.

Jones has presented and performed major compositional works throughout the United States and Canada, including during Western Front residencies in Vancouver in 2019 and 2022. Jones was the inaugural Artist-in-Residence and curator for the 2022 MATA Festival.

In 2024, Jones was announced as incoming Assistant Professor of Music at Wesleyan University.

Jones' musical collaborations include performing with Matthew Shipp, the quartet Grass Roots, and the punk-jazz quartet Little Women. Jones has composed for and worked on projects in new music, contemporary and avant-garde jazz groups, chamber ensembles, modern dance performance and multi-media.

Notable releases include Man'ish Boy (A Raw & Beautiful Thing), his debut album as a leader (AUM Fidelity, 2009); Big Gurl (Smell My Dream) (AUM Fidelity, 2011); Raw Demoon Alchemy (a lone operation), his first solo saxophone project (Northern Spy Records, 2021); and the four track LP fLuXkit Vancouver (-i-t-s- suite but sacred), co-released in 2023 by Northern Spy Records and WeJazz.

== Discography ==
=== As leader/co-leader ===
Release year	Artist	Title	Label	Notes
2007	Little Women	Teeth	Sockets	Jones, Travis Laplante (tenor sax), Ben Greenberg (guitar), Jason Nazary (drums)
2009	Darius Jones Trio	Man'ish Boy (A Raw & Beautiful Thing)	AUM Fidelity	Jones, Cooper-Moore (piano, diddley-bo), Rakalam Bob Moses (drums)
2010	Little Women	Throat	AUM Fidelity	Jones, Laplante (tenor sax), Andrew Smiley (guitar), Nazary (drums)
2011	Darius Jones & Matthew Shipp	Cosmic Lieder	AUM Fidelity	Jones, Shipp (piano)
2011	Darius Jones Trio	Big Gurl (Smell My Dream)	AUM Fidelity	Jones, Adam Lane (bass), Nazary (drums)
2012	Darius Jones Quartet	Book of Mæ'bul (Another Kind of Sunrise)	AUM Fidelity	Jones, Matt Mitchell (piano), Trevor Dunn (bass), Ches Smith (drums)
2012	Grass Roots	Grass Roots	AUM Fidelity	Jones, Sean Conly (bass), Alex Harding (baritone sax), Chad Taylor (drums)
2013	Little Women	Lung	AUM Fidelity	Jones, Laplante (tenor sax), Smiley (guitar), Nazary (drums)
2014	Darius Jones & Matthew Shipp	The Darkseid Recital	AUM Fidelity	Jones, Shipp (piano)
2014	Darius Jones	The Oversoul Manual	AUM Fidelity	Composer; performed by The Elizabeth-Caroline Unit: Amirtha Kidambi, Sarah Martin, Jean Carla Rodea, Kristin Slipp (voice)
2015	Darius Jones Quartet	Le bébé de Brigitte	AUM Fidelity	Mitchell (piano), Conly (bass), Pascal Niggenkemper (bass), Smith (drums), ft. Emilie Lesbros (voice, piano)
2021	Darius Jones	Raw Demoon Alchemy (A Lone Operation)	Northern Spy	Solo
2023	Darius Jones	fLuXkit Vancouver (-i-t-s suite but sacred)	Northern Spy / WeJazz	Composer, Darius Jones (alto saxophone) with Gerald Cleaver (drums), Jesse Zubot (violin), Josh Zubot (violin), Peggy Lee (cello), James Meger (bass)
2024	Darius Jones	Legend of E'boi (The Hypervigilant Eye)	AUM Fidelity	Composer, Darius Jones (alto saxophone) with Gerald Cleaver (drums), Chris Lightcap (bass)

=== As sideman ===
Release	Leader	Title	Label
2023	Matana Roberts	Coin Coin Chapter Five: In the Garden	Constellation Records
2021	Marc Ribot	Hope	Northern Spy
2020	Eric Revis	Slipknots Through a Looking Glass	Pyroclastic Records
2019	Fay Victor	Barn Songs	Northern Spy
2016	Nasheet Waits	Between Nothingness and Infinity	Laborie Jazz
2014	Eric Revis	In Memory of Things Yet Seen	Clean Feed
2013	Gerald Cleaver	Life in the Sugar Candle Mines	Northern Spy
2010	William Hooker	Earth's Orbit	NoBusiness
2013	Adam Lane	Absolute Horizon	NoBusiness
2013	Sabir Mateen	The Sabir Mateen Jubilee Ensemble	Not Two
2013	William Parker	Essence of Ellington	Centering
2010	Mike Pride	Betweenwhile	AUM Fidelity
2013	Mara Rosenbloom	Songs from the Ground	Fresh Sound New Talent
2012	Federico Ughi	Songs for Four Cities	Skycap
