= Scratching the Surface (Rob Brown and Lou Grassi album) =

Studio album by Rob Brown and Lou Grassi
- Released: 1998
- Recorded: October 6 & 7, 1997
- Studio: The Spirit Room, Rossie, New York
- Genre: Jazz
- Length: 64:38
- Label: CIMP
- Producer: Robert D. Rusch

Rob Brown chronology
Orbit (1997)	Scratching the Surface (1998)	Visage (2000)

Scratching the Surface is an album by a quartet co-led by jazz saxophonist Rob Brown and drummer Lou Grassi, which was recorded in 1997 and released on CIMP. They are joined by Israeli tenor saxophonist Assif Tsahar and bassist Chris Lightcap.

== Reception ==
Professional ratings
Review scores
Source	Rating
AllMusic	4/5 stars
The Penguin Guide to Jazz	3.5/4 stars

In his review for AllMusic, Steve Loewy states "High points include the wonderful tunes and arrangements by Brown, as well as his highly inventive soloing. If the horns sometimes seem to fly in different directions, the lengthy improvisations should be a sax lover's delight."

The All About Jazz review by Derek Talor notes that "All four men are at the height of their game on this session and the compositions, authored mainly by Brown, are designed with maximum improvisational opportunities in mind."

The Penguin Guide to Jazz observes that "Bob Rusch's sleeve-note seems to hint at a disappointment that this band is playing in a fundamentally conservative style as far as free music is concerned... The result is surely the best record Brown's put his name on".

== Track listing ==
All compositions by Rob Brown except as indicated

1. "The Arc" – 5:14
2. "Stray Arrow" – 3:29
3. "A Hatful" – 8:42
4. "Clean Sweep" – 7:59
5. "3 Rings" – 15:35
6. "Triangle" (Assif Tsahar) – 8:03
7. "Procession" – 8:28
8. "Unitarians" (Chris Lightcap) – 8:08

== Personnel ==
- Rob Brown – alto sax
- Assif Tsahar - tenor sax
- Chris Lightcap – bass
- Lou Grassi – drums
