= Guillermo E. Brown =

American performer and artist (born 1976)

- Born: Guillermo Enrique Brown; 3 May 1976 (age 49); New Haven, Connecticut, U.S.

Guillermo Enrique Brown (born May 3, 1976), also known as Pegasus Warning, is an American drummer, vocalist, performer, and record producer whose works include Soul at the Hands of the Machine, The Beat Kids' Open Rhythm System and Sound Magazine, Black Dreams 1.0, ...Is Arturo Klauft, Handeheld, Shuffle Mode, WOOF TICKET EP, PwEP2, forthcoming full-length album Dream&Destroy and performance piece Bee Boy. His one-man theater piece, Robeson in Space, premiered at Luna Stage (2005).

Additional work includes sound installation cracked unicorns at The Studio Museum in Harlem, performance pieces Postcolonial Bacchanale (Harlem Stage), SYRUP (The Kitchen), supergroup BiLLLL$, the collaborative trio Thiefs, and sound installation for She Talks to Beethoven by Adrienne Kennedy directed by Charlotte Brathwaite at JACK NYC.

== Biography ==
A graduate of Wesleyan University (B.A.) and Bard College (M.F.A.), Brown was adjunct professor at New York University's Clive Davis Institute of Recorded Music and Gallatin School from 2006 to 2008 and Artist-in-Residence at Pacific Northwest College of Art in 2010. He is a recipient of a 2016 Creative Capital Award in Performing Arts for Bee Boy, a recipient of Harvestworks New Works Residency (2001) and Van Lier Fellowship (2002), and a residency at MIT's Center for Art, Science, and Technology (2016–2017).

Most recently he appears as the drummer in the house band (called Melissa) of The Late Late Show with James Corden on CBS, with band leader Reggie Watts. In addition he is featured on over 45 recordings, and has appeared live, recorded and as drummer/vocalist/collaborator with Vijay Iyer, Mike Ladd, David S. Ware, William Parker, Matthew Shipp, Rob Reddy, Roy Campbell, Spring Heel Jack, Anti-Pop Consortium, Anthony Braxton, DJ Spooky, El-P, Carl Hancock Rux, Vernon Reid, DJ Logic, Latasha Diggs, Dave Burrell, George E. Lewis, Mendi & Keith Obadike, Victor Gama, David Gunn, Arto Lindsay, Gordon Voidwell, Tecla, Jahcoozi, Robot Koch, Das Racist, Jamie Lidell, Saul Williams, CANT, Mocky, Twin Shadow, Busdriver, Grisha Coleman, and Wangechi Mutu among others.

== Discography ==
- Pegasus Warning, Woof Ticket EP, (Plug Research), 2013
- Thiefs' full-length LP, drums/voice, (Melanine Harmonique), 2013
- Mocky's Graveyard Novelas, voice, (Heavy Sheet), 2013
- Vijay Iyer/Mike Ladd/Maurice Decaul's Holding It Down: The Veterans' Dreams Project, (Pi Recordings), 2013
- Tecla's We Are The Lucky Ones, co-producer, (Mayimba Music), 2013
- Lucky Paul, Demonspawn, voice, (somethinksounds), 2011
- CANT, Dreams Come True, (Terrible/Warp), 2011
- Andrew Lamb, Rhapsody in Black, (NoBusiness Records), 2011
- Jahcoozi's, Barefoot Wanderer, voice, (Bpitch Control), 2010
- Das Racist's "Don Dada" from Shut Up, Dude, composer/producer, (Michka/Greedhead), 2010
- William Parker, I Plan to Stay a Believer, (Aum Fidelity), 2010
- Shuffle Mode, (Melanine Harmonique later licensed to Cleveland Tapes), 2009
- David S. Ware Quartet, Live in Vilnius, (NoBusiness), 2009
- Guillermo E. Brown/Matthew Shipp Duo, Telephone Popcorn, (Nu Bop Records), 2008
- Crosstalk: American Speech Music, curated by Mendi + Keith Obadike (Bridge Music), 2008
- David S. Ware Quartet, Renunciation, (Aum Fidelity), 2007
- Vijay Iyer + Mike Ladd, Still Life with Commentator, (Savoy Jazz), 2007
- Colorform, Fragments of Youth, (Bonanzagram), 2007
- George Lewis, SEQUEL, (INTAKT), 2006
- Dave Burrell's DB3, Momentum, (High Two Records), 2006
- David S. Ware, BalladWare, (Thirsty Ear), 2006
- Guillermo E. Brown, Handeheld, (Melanine Harmonique Records), 2005
- Guillermo E. Brown, ...is Arturo Klauft, (Melanine Harmonique Records), 2005
- Mike Ladd's Negrophilia, (Thirsty Ear), 2005
- David S. Ware, Live in the World, (Thirsty Ear), 2005
- Guillermo E. Brown's Black Dreams 1.0, (Melanine Harmonique Records), 2004
- El-P, High Water, (Thirsty Ear), 2004
- Matthew Shipp Trio, The Trio Plays Ware, (Splasc(H)), 2004
- DJ Spooky, celestial mechanix, (Thirsty Ear), 2004
- Creative Trans-Informational Alliance, Atrospect Sound 1: An Opera in Four Acts, (CTIA), 2004
- Guillermo E. Brown's The Beat Kids, Open Rhythm System, (7H/Uncle Junior ), 2003
- Antipop Consortium, Antipop vs. Matthew Shipp, (Thirsty Ear), 2003
- David S. Ware String Ensemble, Threads, (Thirsty Ear), 2003
- The Little Huey Creative Music Orchestra, Spontaneous, (Splasc(H)), 2003
- DJ Wally, Nothing Stays the Same, (Thirsty Ear), 2003
- DJ Spooky, Dubtometry, (Thirsty Ear), 2003
- Guillermo E. Brown's Soul at the Hands of the Machine], (Thirsty Ear), 2002
- DJ Spooky's Optometry, (Thirsty Ear), 2002
- Matthew Shipp's Nu Bop, (Thirsty Ear), 2002
- David S. Ware, Freedom Suite, (Aum Fidelity), 2002
- Rob Reddy's Honor System, Seeing by the Light of My Own Candle, (Knitting Factory), 2001
- Spring Heel Jack, Masses, (Thirsty Ear), 2001
- Roy Campbell, It's Krunch Time, (Thirsty Ear), 2001
- David S. Ware, Corridors & Parallels, (Aum Fidelity), 2001
- William Parker and The Little Huey Creative Music Orchestra, The Raincoat in the River Vol. 1, (Eremite), 2001
- David S. Ware, Surrendered, (Sony/Columbia), 2000

== Education ==
- M.F.A., Music/Sound, The Milton Avery Graduate School of the Arts at Bard College, Annandale-on-Hudson, NY, 2005
- B.A., Music, Wesleyan University, Middletown, CT, 1998

== Residencies ==
- Office Hours, The Kennedy Center's REACH, 2022, Washington, DC
- FORM Arcosanti, 2019, Arcosanti, Arizona
- Artist-in-Residence, Pacific Northwest College of Art, 2010, Portland, Oregon
- Future Places Festival, 2009, Porto, Portugal
- Sant'Anna Arresi Jazz Workshop, 2004, Sardinia, Italy
- Van Lier Residency, Harvestworks, 2002–2003, New York City
- Artist Fellowship Harvestworks, 2000–2001, New York City
