= Saturnian (album) =

Live album by David S. Ware
- Released: March 9, 2010
- Recorded: October 15, 2009; Abrons Arts Center, NYC
- Genre: Jazz
- Length: 38:42
- Label: AUM Fidelity; AUM 060
- Producer: Steven Joerg

David S. Ware chronology
Shakti (2009)	Saturnian (2010)	Onecept (2010)

Saturnian (subtitled Solo Saxophones, Volume 1) is a live solo album by saxophonist David S. Ware, who plays the saxello, stritch and tenor saxophone which was recorded in 2009 and released on the AUM Fidelity label.

== Reception ==
Professional ratings
Review scores
Source	Rating
AllMusic	4/5 stars

In his review for AllMusic, Michael G. Nastos wrote "These three pieces flow beautifully, not in the strictest angelic, pretty, or peaceful fashion, but with the clear, assured dignity and confidence Ware has always displayed. It's not intended for garden-variety jazz listeners, but for fans and those aware of the gifts of this giant-stepping innovator in modern creative music".

All About Jazz noted "While Ware may be best known for his quartet work, it's clear that this is but one facet of his overarching vision. He expands his instrumental arsenal here to take in the saxello and the stritch, as well as his customary tenor sax, and the album's three pieces pan out in that order".

== Track listing ==
All compositions by David S. Ware

1. "Methone" - 14:24
2. "Pallene" - 12:37
3. "Anthe" - 11:41

== Personnel ==
- David S. Ware – saxello (track 1), stritch (track 2), tenor saxophone (track 3)
