= The Beautiful (album) =

Studio album by Triptych Myth
- Released: 2005
- Recorded: March 31, 2005
- Studio: Systems Two Studio, Brooklyn
- Genre: Jazz
- Length: 48:22
- Label: AUM Fidelity
- Producer: Steven Joerg, Triptych Myth

Cooper-Moore chronology
Triptych Myth (2004)	The Beautiful (2005)	Tells Untold (2005)

The Beautiful is the second album and the first studio recording by Triptych Myth, a trio consisting of Cooper-Moore on piano, Tom Abbs on bass and Chad Taylor on drums. It was recorded in 2005 and released on the AUM Fidelity label. "Frida K. The Beautiful" is dedicated to Mexican painter Frida Kahlo. "Pooch" is dedicated to bassist Wilber Morris.

== Reception ==
The All About Jazz review by Michael McCaw states "The Beautiful is a deeply affecting album of piano-driven interplay that seamlessly spans a range of jazz genres without a hint of trepidation or a false step."

In his review for JazzTimes Mike Shanley notes that "Free jazz might often consist of blistering, harsh sonorities, but these three prove that the quest for beauty is as much a part of this music as catharsis."

== Track listing ==
All compositions by Cooper-Moore except as indicated

1. "All Up in It" – 4:54
2. "Frida K. The Beautiful" – 5:22
3. "Trident" – 4:16
4. "Spiraling Out" – 6:44
5. "Pooch" – 5:52
6. "A Time To" – 5:01
7. "Last Minute Trip Part One" – 1:46
8. "Last Minute Trip Part Two" – 3:18
9. "Poppa's Gin in the Chicken Feed" – 7:13
10. "Robinia Pseudoacacia" – 3:56

== Personnel ==
- Cooper-Moore – piano
- Tom Abbs – bass
- Chad Taylor - drums
