= Live at Jazzfestival Saalfelden 2011 =

Live album by David S. Ware
- Released: 2012
- Recorded: August 27, 2011
- Venue: Saalfelden, Austria
- Genre: Jazz
- Length: 66:56
- Label: AUM Fidelity
- Producer: Steven Joerg

David S. Ware chronology
Organica (2011)	Live at Jazzfestival Saalfelden 2011 (2012)	Live in Sant'Anna Arresi, 2004 (2016)

Live at Jazzfestival Saalfelden 2011 is an album by American jazz saxophonist David S. Ware released on the AUM Fidelity label. It documents the second live performance by Ware's band Planetary Unknown following its world premiere at Vision Festival 16 in New York.

== Reception ==
Professional ratings
Review scores
Source	Rating
Down Beat	4/5 stars

The All About Jazz review by John Sharpe says that "this is long-form improvisation, where the group navigates towards a satisfactory ending, guided by an innate sense of structure, outstanding instrumental prowess and keen appreciation of each others' contribution."

The Down Beat review by Alain Drouot states "Four individualities, each capable of steering the music in one direction or shaping the music, an intuitive sense of placement, and a clear focus that prevents the band from getting carried away are enough to explain why Planetary Unknown is one of the strongest free-jazz units at the moment."

In his review for JazzTimes Scott Verrastro notes that "It's hard to fathom that the median age of this ensemble is 66 years old, as they burn with more passion than many who could be their grandchildren. This extremely elevated level of empathic interplay could only be achieved by years of experience and artistic engagement."

The Wondering Sound review by Steve Holtje claims "This is music of remarkable intensity, ebbing and flowing organically but always tautly conceived."

== Track listing ==
All compositions by Ware / Cooper-Moore / Parker / Ali

1. "Precessional 1" - 33:15
2. "Precessional 2" - 19:04
3. "Precessional 3" - 14:37

== Personnel ==
- David S. Ware – tenor saxophone
- Cooper-Moore – piano
- William Parker – bass
- Muhammad Ali – drums
