= AUM Fidelity =

Record label

- Founded: 1997
- Founder: Steven Joerg
- Genre: Jazz, avant-garde jazz, free jazz, indie rock
- Country of origin: U.S.
- Location: Brooklyn, New York
- Official website: www.aumfidelity.com

AUM Fidelity is an independent record label in New York City primarily devoted to avant-garde jazz artists such as William Parker, Matthew Shipp, and David S. Ware. It has also released recordings by improvisational rock band Shrimp Boat and exclusively distributes the CaseQuarter and Riti labels. It was founded in 1997 by former Homestead Records label manager Steven Joerg.

== History ==
Founder Steven Joerg is a native of Chicago and has stated that in high school he was heavily influenced by the do-it-yourself (DIY) approach of punk rock, especially labels such as SST Records. Moving to New York City after graduating college, Joerg worked for Bar/None Records. He became a manager of the indie rock label Homestead Records in 1992, where he signed and promoted albums by Babe the Blue Ox, Tara Key, Sleepyhead, Soul-Junk, and others. After releasing a well-received album by free jazz drummer William Hooker, Joerg convinced a reluctant Homestead to sign notable jazz musician David S. Ware and his Quartet. Their first release on the label, Cryptology, received a lead review in Rolling Stone.

Joerg left Homestead in December 1996 and founded AUM Fidelity in Brooklyn in January 1997. His intent was to concentrate on modern jazz. He liquidated his savings, sold half his record collection, and took out a loan. The label derived its name partially from the Charles Mingus album Mingus Ah Um, but mostly from Om, the mantra representing the "soundless sound of the universe, the original tone and source of all creation". Not low fidelity or high fidelity, but AUM Fidelity." The label launched in September 1997 with the release of David S. Ware's Wisdom of Uncertainty, and William Parker's Sunrise in the Tone World.

AUM has released over 90 albums which have been acclaimed around the world. In addition to Ware and Parker, artists who have recorded for the label include Joe Morris, Whit Dickey, Other Dimensions in Music, Test, Farmers by Nature, Matthew Shipp, Mat Maneri, Hamid Drake, Rob Brown, Daniel Carter, Roy Campbell, Cooper-Moore, Chad Taylor, Roy Nathanson, Kidd Jordan, Eri Yamamoto, Gerald Cleaver, Craig Taborn, Bill Dixon, Jim Hobbs/The Fully Celebrated, Darius Jones, Little Women, Mike Pride, and others. AUM Fidelity began distributing Joe Morris' Riti label in 2002. In 2003 it co-launched the CaseQuarter label, which is devoted to gospel music of the American south.

AUM Fidelity has supported the New York City downtown jazz scene. Joerg has volunteered at the Vision Festival since 1996 and produced Vision One, a two-disc benefit compilation of material recorded at the festival. AUM Fidelity was asked by musician and artist John Zorn to curate his avant-garde locale The Stone for June 16–30, 2011, which featured performances by many of the label's artists, including its then most recent signing, alto saxophonist/composer Darius Jones. In January 2009, the label was instrumental in finding a kidney donor for David S. Ware. Following his recovery and prior to his passing, Ware released five new albums with the label, including a recording of his final concert appearance, Live at Jazzfestival Saalfelden 2011. Setsuko S. Ware, David Ware's widow, and Joerg produced the Memorial Service for David S. Ware, which took place on January 7, 2013.

AUM Fidelity celebrated its 15th anniversary in June 2011 with two weeks of curated performances at the Stone, and culminated with a series of concerts in June 2012 at Suoni Per Il Popolo (Montreal) and Vision Festival (New York City). William Parker's 8-CD box set, Wood Flute Songs, was produced the following year and released in late 2013, garnering a 5-star review in Down Beat and chosen as the No.1 Archive Release of the Year by The Wire. AUM continues to produce new recordings, and in 2015 launched the David S. Ware Archive Series (DSW-ARC) with a fully remixed & wholly expanded edition of Ware's first (1977) recordings as a bandleader, Birth of a Being.

== Discography ==
- AUM001 – 1997: Wisdom of Uncertainty by David S. Ware (Quartet)
- AUM002/3 – 1997: Sunrise in the Tone World by William Parker (and The Little Huey Creative Music Orchestra)
- AUM004 – 1997: Antennae by Joe Morris (Trio)
- AUM005 – 1998: Transonic by Whit Dickey (Trio)
- AUM006 – 1998: Now! by Other Dimensions in Music (Roy Campbell, Daniel Carter, William Parker, Rashid Bakr)
- AUM007/8 – 1998: Vision One: Vision Festival 1997 Compiled by Various Artists
- AUM009 – 1998: A Cloud of Black Birds by Joe Morris (Quartet)
- AUM010/11 – 1998: The Peach Orchard by William Parker (In Order to Survive)
- AUM012 – 1999: Test by Test (Tom Bruno, Sabir Mateen, Matthew Heyner, Daniel Carter
- AUM013 – 2000: Time Is of the Essence Is Beyond Time by Other Dimensions in Music (Roy Campbell, Daniel Carter, William Parker, Rashid Bakr, with special guest Matthew Shipp)
- AUM014 – 2000: Soul Search by Joe Morris & Mat Maneri
- AUM015/16 – 2000: Mayor of Punkville by William Parker (& The Little Huey Creative Music Orchestra)
- AUM017 – 2001: Piercing the Veil by William Parker & Hamid Drake
- AUM018 – 2001: Singularity by Joe Morris
- AUM019 – 2001: Corridors & Parallels by David S. Ware (Quartet)
- AUM020 – 2001: Life Cycle by The Nommonsemble (Whit Dickey, Rob Brown, Mat Maneri, Matthew Shipp)
- AUM021 – 2002: Black Cherry by Organic Grooves (dub remix/remake/remodel of AUM017)
- AUM022 – 2002: O'Neal's Porch by William Parker (Quartet)
- AUM023 – 2002: Freedom Suite by David S. Ware (Quartet)
- AUM024 – 2002: Going to Church by Maneri Ensemble (Joe Maneri, Mat Maneri, Matthew Shipp, Roy Campbell, Barre Phillips, Randy Peterson)
- AUM025 – 2003: Luminescence by Daniel Carter & Reuben Radding
- AUM026 – 2003: Skin by Daughter (this NYC punk rock band's one album)
- AUM027 – 2004: {a sampler of} Something Grand by Shrimp Boat (promotion–only CD for the Box Set)
- AUM028–31– 2004: Something Grand [Box Set] by Shrimp Boat
- AUM033 – 2005: Speckly by Shrimp Boat (CD issue of their 1989 LP debut)
- AUM034 – 2005: Sound Unity by William Parker (Quartet)
- AUM035 – 2005: The Beautiful by Triptych Myth (Cooper-Moore, Chad Taylor, Tom Abbs)
- AUM036 – 2006: Long Hidden: The Olmec Series by William Parker (& The Olmec Group)
- AUM037 – 2006: Sotto Voce by Roy Nathanson
- AUM038 – 2006: Palm of Soul by Kidd Jordan, Hamid Drake, William Parker
- AUM039/40 – 2007: First Communion + Piercing the Veil by William Parker & Hamid Drake
- AUM041 – 2007: Summer Snow by William Parker & Hamid Drake
- AUM042 – 2007: Renunciation by David S. Ware (Quartet)
- AUM043 – 2007: Corn Meal Dance by William Parker (Raining on the Moon)
- AUM044 – 2008: Crown Trunk Root Funk by Rob Brown Ensemble (with Craig Taborn, William Parker, Gerald Cleaver)
- AUM045 – 2008: Akhenaten Suite by Roy Campbell Ensemble (with Billy Bang +++)
- AUM046 – 2008: 17 Musicians in Search of a Sound: Darfur by Bill Dixon (Orchestra)
- AUM047 – 2008: Double Sunrise Over Neptune by William Parker (Orchestra)
- AUM048 – 2008: Duologue by Eri Yamamoto (with Daniel Carter, Hamid Drake, William Parker, Federico Ughi)
- AUM049 – 2008: Redwoods by Eri Yamamoto (Trio)
- AUM050 – 2008: Petit Oiseau by William Parker (Quartet)
- AUM051 – 2008: The Cedar Box Recordings by Cooper–Moore
- AUM052 – 2009: Shakti by David S. Ware (with Joe Morris, William Parker, Warren Smith)
- AUM053 – 2009: Farmers by Nature by Gerald Cleaver, William Parker, Craig Taborn
- AUM054 – 2009: Drunk on the Blood of the Holy Ones by The Fully Celebrated (Jim Hobbs, Timo Shanko, Django Carranza)
- AUM056 – 2009: Wildlife by Joe Morris, Petr Cancura, Luther Gray
- AUM057 – 2009: Man'ish Boy (A Raw & Beautiful Thing) by Darius Jones (Trio)
- AUM058 – 2009: Today on Earth by Joe Morris (Quartet)
- AUM059 – 2010: In Each Day, Something Good by Eri Yamamoto (Trio)
- AUM060 – 2010: Saturnian (Solo Saxophones, Volume 1) by David S. Ware
- AUM061 – 2010: Throat by Little Women
- AUM062/63 – 2010: I Plan to Stay a Believer by William Parker (& large ensemble)
- AUM064 – 2010: Onecept by David S. Ware (with William Parker, Warren Smith)
- AUM065 – 2010: Betweenwhile by Mike Pride's From Bacteria To Boys
- AUM066 – 2011: Cosmic Lieder by Darius Jones & Matthew Shipp
- AUM067 – 2011: Out of This World's Distortions by Farmers by Nature (Gerald Cleaver, William Parker, Craig Taborn)
- AUM068 – 2011: Planetary Unknown by David S. Ware (with Cooper-Moore, William Parker, Muhammad Ali)
- AUM069 – 2011: Big Gurl (Smell My Dream) by Darius Jones (Trio)
- AUM070 – 2011: Organica by David S. Ware
- AUM071 – 2012: The Next Page by Eri Yamamoto (Trio)
- AUM072 – 2012: Book of Mæ'bul (Another Kind of Sunrise) by Darius Jones (Quartet)
- AUM073 – 2012: Altitude by Joe Morris, William Parker, Gerald Cleaver
- AUM074 – 2012: Live at Jazzfestival Saalfelden 2011 by David S. Ware (with Cooper-Moore, William Parker, Muhammad Ali)
- AUM075 – 2012: Grass Roots by Grass Roots (Sean Conly, Alex Harding, Darius Jones, Chad Taylor)
- AUM076 – 2013: Lung by Little Women
- AUM077 – 2013: Birthing Days by Mike Pride's From Bacteria to Boys
- AUM078 – 2013: Drummer's Corpse by Mike Pride
- AUM079 – 2013: Firefly by Eri Yamamoto (Trio)
- AUM080–87 – 2013: Wood Flute Songs [Box Set] by William Parker (Quartet/Quintet/Sextet/Septet/Ensemble)
- AUM088 – 2014: The Darkseid Recital by Darius Jones & Matthew Shipp
- AUM089/90 – 2014: Love and Ghosts by Farmers by Nature (Gerald Cleaver, William Parker, Craig Taborn)
- AUM091 – 2014: The Oversoul Manual by Darius Jones (featuring The Elizabeth–Caroline Unit)
- AUM092/93/94 – 2015: For Those Who Are, Still [Box Set] by William Parker (& four different ensembles)
- AUM095 – 2015: Le bébé de Brigitte (Lost in Translation) by Darius Jones (Quartet+)
- AUM096/97 (DSW-ARC01) – 2015: Birth of a Being (Expanded) by David S. Ware (Agogee trio with Cooper-Moore, Marc Edwards)
- AUM098 – 2015: Great Spirit by William Parker (Raining On The Moon)
- AUM099 – 2016: Life by Eri Yamamoto (Trio)
- AUM100 (DSW-ARC02) – 2016: Live in Sant'Anna Arresi, 2004 by David S. Ware & Matthew Shipp
- AUM101 – 2017: Vessel in Orbit by Whit Dickey, Mat Maneri, Matthew Shipp
- AUM102/103 (DSW-ARC03) – 2017: Live in New York, 2010 by David S. Ware Trio (with William Parker, Warren Smith)
- AUM104/105 – 2017: Meditation/Resurrection by William Parker Quartets (with Cooper-Moore, Rob Brown, Hamid Drake, Jalalu-Kalvert Nelson)
- AUM106 – 2018: Seraphic Light by Daniel Carter, William Parker, Matthew Shipp
- AUM107 (DSW-ARC04) – 2018: The Balance (Vision Festival XV +) by David S. Ware Trio (with William Parker, Warren Smith)
- AUM108/109 – 2019: Peace Planet & Box of Light by Whit Dickey Tao Quartets (with R. Brown, M. Shipp, W. Parker, S. Swell, M. Bisio)
- AUM110/111 – 2019: Live/Shapeshifter by William Parker / In Order To Survive (with Rob Brown, Cooper-Moore, Hamid Drake)
- AUM112 – 2019: Goshu Ondo Suite by Eri Yamamoto Trio & Choral Chameleon
- AUM113 (DSW-ARC05) – 2019: Théâtre Garonne, 2008 by David S. Ware New Quartet (with Joe Morris, William Parker, Warren Smith)
- AUM114 – 2020: New World Order b/w Soledad by William Parker Ensembles featuring Leena Conquest
- AUM115 – 2021: Mayan Space Station by William Parker (trio with Ava Mendoza & Gerald Cleaver)
- AUM116 – 2021: Painters Winter by William Parker (trio with Daniel Carter & Hamid Drake)
- AUM117 – 2023: Echolocation by Mendoza Hoff Revels (Ava Mendoza, Devin Hoff, James Brandon Lewis, Ches Smith)
- AUM118 – 2024: Heart Trio by William Parker, Cooper-Moore, Hamid Drake
- AUM119 – 2024: Cereal Music by William Parker & Ellen Christi
- AUM120 – 2024: Legend of e'Boi (The Hypervigilant Eye) by Darius Jones

Centering Records (William Parker & AUM Fidelity cooperative productions)

- CENT1004 – 2010: Uncle Joe's Spirit House by William Parker (Organ Quartet)
- CENT1005/6/7 – 2011: Crumbing in the Shadows Is Fraulein Miller's Stale Cake [Box Set] by William Parker
- CENT1008/9 – 2012: Essence of Ellington by William Parker (Orchestra)
- CENT1012 – 2016: Stan's Hat Flapping in the Wind by William Parker performed by Cooper–Moore & Lisa Sokolov
- CENT1013 – 2017: Bass Duo by William Parker & Stefano Scodanibbio
- CENT1015/16/17 – 2018: Voices Fall From The Sky [Box Set] by William Parker
- CENT1018/19 – 2018: Flower in A Stained-Glass Window & The Blinking of The Ear by William Parker
- CENT1020-ADV – 2020: Trencadís [a selection from Migration of Silence Into and Out of The Tone World] by William Parker
- CENT1020-1029 – 2021: Migration of Silence Into and Out of The Tone World [Box Set] by William Parker (Various Ensembles)
- CENT1030 – 2022: Universal Tonality [Box Set] by William Parker
- CENT1004LP – 2024: Uncle Joe's Spirit House by William Parker (Organ Quartet) – ltd LP edition

CaseQuarter (co–launched by AUM Fidelity; dedicated to sacred music of the American South featuring electric guitar)

- CASE101 – 2003: God's Got It: The Legendary Booker and Jackson Singles by Reverend Charlie Jackson
- CASE102 – 2004: You Without Sin, Cast the First Stone by Isaiah Owens
- CASE103 – 2006: Singing Songs of Praise by The Spiritualaires of Hurtsboro, Alabama
- CASE104 – 2009: I Got Two Wings: Incidents and Anecdotes of The Two–Winged Preacher and Electric Guitar Evangelist [Book+CD] by Elder Utah Smith (book by Lynn Abbott)

== See also ==
- List of record labels
