= Book of Mæ'bul (Another Kind of Sunrise) =

Studio album by Darius Jones
- Released: 2012
- Recorded: September 7, 2011
- Studio: Systems Two, Brooklyn
- Genre: Jazz
- Length: 55:45
- Label: AUM Fidelity
- Producer: Darius Jones, Steven Joerg

Darius Jones chronology
| Big Gurl (Smell My Dream) (2011) | Book of Mæ'bul (Another Kind of Sunrise) (2012) | Grass Roots (2012) |

Book of Mæ'bul (Another Kind of Sunrise) is an album by American jazz saxophonist Darius Jones, which was recorded in 2011 and released on the AUM Fidelity label. Book of the Mæ'bul is the third chapter in the Man'ish Boy series created by Jones and graphic artist Randal Wilcox. The album features his working quartet with pianist Matt Mitchell, bassist Trevor Dunn and drummer Ches Smith.

== Reception ==
Professional ratings
Review scores
| Source | Rating |
|---|---|
| AllMusic | 4/5 stars |
| Down Beat | 4/5 stars |

In his review for AllMusic, Thom Jurek states "Book of Mæ'bul (Another Kind of Sunrise) is the new high-water mark for Jones' leadership ventures in the future; it stands as a giant step forward in his catalog."

The Down Beat review by Peter Margasak says "I think the full picture of Jones’ talent and vision has yet to emerge, but with each new recording we’re seeing another facet of a magnificently gifted musician."

The All About Jazz review by John Sharpe states "Saxophonist Darius Jones has rung the changes on each of his widely acclaimed leadership dates. Book Of Mæ'bul subverts expectations again with an all new quartet drawn from NYC's finest, who shift between intricate script and flowing invention in the blink of an eye."

In his review for JazzTimes Shaun Brady notes that "Jones’ previous releases have been touted as a more warm-blooded alternative to the headier complexity of many of his contemporaries, but Mæ’bul asserts a more integrated view of those approaches, with full-throated emotion bursting out of darting, angular lines, swaggering swing derailed by eccentric swerves."

The Exclaim! review by Bryon Hayes states "With fluid melodies, unhurried pacing and a heightened sense of emotion, Mæ'bul elevates Jones's stature as both a player and composer."

The Point of Departure review by Bill Shoemaker notes that "the piano is the hub for everything that seems new or more refined in Jones’ music. Mitchell’s keen sense of how to shape and shade materials, and his ease in roaming the frontier between lead and support functions, makes him an excellent foil for both Jones the composer and the player."

== Track listing ==
All compositions by Darius Jones

1. "The Enjoli Moon" – 6:50
2. "The Fagley Blues" – 5:43
3. "Winkie" – 4:22
4. "Be Patient With Me" – 7:38
5. "My Baby" – 8:45
6. "You Have Me Seeing Red" – 7:39
7. "So Sad'" – 8:00
8. "Roosevelt'" – 6:48

== Personnel ==
- Darius Jones – alto sax
- Matt Mitchell – piano
- Trevor Dunn – bass
- Ches Smith – drums
