= Sound Pictures for Solo Trumpet =

Studio album by Hugh Ragin
- Released: 2002
- Genre: Jazz
- Length: 1:00:22
- Label: Hopscotch Records; HOP 13

Hugh Ragin chronology
| Feel the Sunshine (2002) | Sound Pictures for Solo Trumpet (2002) | Revelation (2004) |

Sound Pictures for Solo Trumpet is a solo album by trumpeter Hugh Ragin. It was released in 2002 by Hopscotch Records.

== Reception ==
Professional ratings
Review scores
| Source | Rating |
|---|---|
| The Penguin Guide to Jazz | 3.5/4 stars |

The authors of The Penguin Guide to Jazz Recordings wrote: "solo trumpet is a touch discipline for a record, and it's to Hugh's credit that he makes this set as engaging to a listener as it is."

Ken Waxman of JazzWord described Ragin as a "consummate trumpet technician," and stated: "The most interesting pieces... are two of the longest... 'Rhythm Unit #5'... centres around constantly repeated grace notes that fluctuate up the scale. Growls and peeps arise from within the bell followed by a melody that moves from allegro to adagio, finally expanding from chromatic trills into loud, sharp, pinpointed whole notes. 'Rhythm Unit #4'... features a wavering tone, staccato triple tonguing and broken high notes, which — perhaps following Ragin's legit training — continue in a straight line rather than turning chaotic."

A writer for The New York City Jazz Record called the album "a stand-out," and commented: "the trumpeter says it wasn't a strange concept, given solo discs by [Anthony] Braxton, [Leo] Smith and [Roscoe] Mitchell. On it Ragin salutes figures as disparate as Miles Davis, Braxton and even plays 'Variations on a Theme by Paganini' while still maintaining his originality."

== Track listing ==
"Rhythm Units" #1–9 composed by Wadada Leo Smith. "Perpetual Motion" based on a theme by Niccolò Paganini. Remaining compositions by Hugh Ragin.

1. "For the Joy of Sound Space & Music (This is an Improvisation Using Studio Technology)" – 10:29
2. "Parisian Sunrise (This is a Ballad Using Natural Trumpet Tones)" – 4:51
3. "Rhythm Unit #1 (This Composition Reminds Me of the Sun and How It Creates Shadows)" – 2:13
4. "Rhythm Unit #2 (This Rhythm Unit as I Interpreted It, Reminds Me of the Stars and How They Function in the Universe)" – 2:04
5. "Rhythm Unit #3 (Listen to This Rhythm Unit as Mean of Entering Peace)" – 4:12
6. "Rhythm Unit #4 (We Can Change for the Better When We Seek to Expend Our Horizons)" – 2:13
7. "Rhythm Unit #5 (This is a Reflection on Thoughts and Intents)" – 4:34
8. "Rhythm Unit #6 (This Reminds Me of When the Sun Comes Out, You Cannot See the Stars)" – 5:22
9. "Rhythm Unit #7 (Abstract Blue is the Colour of Music)" – 3:43
10. "Rhythm Unit #8 (This a Space for Sound Music)" – 3:28
11. "Rhythm Unit #9 (We Close our Rhythm Units with Sound Music for Space)" – 3:06
12. "Ballad for Miles (Self Explanatory)" – 4:23
13. "Perpetual Motion (Variations on a Theme by Paganini)" – 1:59
14. "Braxton Dues (Dedicated to Anthony Braxton)" – 4:27
15. "Emergency Exit" – 2:04

== Personnel ==
- Hugh Ragin – trumpet
