= Strange Abominable Snowmen =

Strange Abominable Snowmen (ISBN 0445024933) is a book written in 1970 by Warren Smith which claimed to offer scientific proof as to the existence of Bigfoot. The book's main expert was one "Major Stoyanow" who allegedly came into contact with a Bigfoot and relayed the information. The authenticity of the book's claims are often questioned.
