= Moldy figs =

Pejorative term for jazz purists

Moldy figs are purist advocates of early jazz, originally those such as Rudi Blesh, Alan Lomax, and James Jones, who argued that jazz took a wrong turn in the early 1920s with developments such as the introduction of printed scores. Blesh, for example, dismissed the work of Duke Ellington as "tea dansant music" with no jazz content whatever.

The term was later used by the beboppers with reference to those who preferred older jazz to bebop. During the post-World War II era there was something of a revival of "traditional" jazz, and bebop displaced swing as the "modern" music to which it was contrasted. More recently, Gene Santoro has referred to Wynton Marsalis and others, who embrace bebop but not other forms of jazz that followed it, as "latter-day moldy figs", with bebop now lying on the side of "jazz tradition".

Although the term was originally a pejorative, it has at times been embraced by trad jazz fans and players.

In Stan Freberg's recorded comedy sketch "Yankee Doodle Go Home", the fife player isn't happy with the drummer. "No, I mean when I accepted the gig I didn't know I was going to play fife with the kind of moldy fig drumming like what is going on up ahead there, man."

Early uses of the phrase can be cited as starting in 1945, as part of an article published by Esquire magazine about the first wave of jazz traditionalists and their non-acceptance of the bebop style. From 1945 to 2010 the appearance of the phrase had just more than doubled in the common language of all musicians, but in the slang of jazz musicians in particular.

Outside of the musical context, the term "moldy figs," sometimes spelled "mouldy figs" or "mouldy figges," can refer to an individual who is generally conservative and old-fashioned.
