= Warren Smith (author) =

American cryptozoologist and author (1931–2003)

Warren Billy Smith, (Iowa, 1931–2003) was an American author best known for his books on cryptozoology, UFOs and the Hollow Earth theory. In addition he authored a large number of historical romance and western novels.

== Life and career ==
Warren Billy Smith on the banks of the Mississippi River, near his home in Clinton, Iowa

Smith was a writer born in West Virginia on January 24, 1931, who lived in Iowa starting in 1953, living first in Davenport, then Durant, and from 1960 in Clinton, Iowa until his death on May 9, 2003. He published many newspaper reviews of automobiles, newspaper and magazine articles on boating and other subjects, and from 1965 until near his death, a large number (over fifty) of paranormal books on topics such as Bigfoot, ancient astronauts, Atlantis and lost cities. Smith was also a prolific fiction writer with many novels to his credit, including westerns and historical romance series.

Warren Billy Smith was married to Joan Margaret Smith, née Tully (1934- 2015) whom he had met during his strike breaking days, e.g. union busting at newspapers. Warren and Joan were divorced after 31 years of marriage.

In the early 1960s Smith published a weekly newspaper in Durant, Iowa. He maintained the Chandler & Price letterpress along with all the type in his basement until his death in 2003. Also in the 1960s, he was the publisher and editor of Volt Age, a trade journal dealing with rebuilding electric motors.

Warren Smith claimed to have been a student of Lowney Handy at the Handy Writers' Colony. He was. Often simply called the Handy Colony, or The Colony, located in downstate Illinois (Marshall), the colony operated from 1950–1964. In the late 1940s Lowney Handy developed a reputation as an inspirational teacher of writing and her colony achieved national attention, through the success of James Jones, its most celebrated member and the author of From Here to Eternity and Some Came Running. By the early 1960s Lowney Handy also worked with writers by correspondence. Warren Smith was one of them. His letters to Lowney Handy and some of his manuscripts are archived in the Handy Colony Collection Archives, as documented in the book: James Jones in Illinois a Guide to the Handy Writers Colony Collection in the Sagamon State University Library Archives. An inventory of author Smith's letters are listed on pages:107, 114, & 122. Coincidentally, his writing partner, Eugene Olson/Brad Steiger was also in correspondence with Lowney (Page 113).

Waren Smith is best known for his books on the Hollow Earth, and his book on Bigfoot titled Strange Abominable Snowmen. His book This Hollow Earth was a popular book on the Hollow Earth theory which discussed evidence from ancient myths and legends such as the Buddhist city of Agharta to the ideas of a physical hell found in religious texts to conclude they were based on actual places inside the Earth. He also discussed in the book that there are tunnels in specific locations such as mountains in South America which lead into the interior of the Earth. He published a number of books under the pseudonym of Eric Norman and he co-wrote various books with the paranormal writer Brad Steiger.

Warren Billy Smith is a self-admitted hoaxster who contrived some of the UFO encounters he wrote about, most notably the Schirmer abduction. This claim is documented in a book written by one of Smith's confidants, Timothy P, Banse, who enjoyed a 30-year personal and professional relationship with Smith. Banse, a professional writer, studied journalism at the University of Iowa where he won the Wilbur Petersen Scholarship and James Blackburn Award. His book credits include William Morrow and Little Brown as well as hundreds of magazine and newspaper articles (Hearst, Time Warner, Harcourt Brace & Jovanovich). The Hoax allegation has also been reported by noted UFOlogist Kevin D. Randle, who recounts, "Warren Smith, who is quoted in some of the UFO books about abduction simply isn’t reliable. He made things up to pad a story. This is no speculation but fact. He told me this himself. He told the same thing to other researchers and writers, so everything that we have, attributed to him, must be carefully reviewed."

In 2019 Dystopia (a publisher) re-issued a number of Mister Smith's most popular paranormal books using CreateSpace and Lulu print on demand and began to sell them on Amazon Books and other websites. Dystopia claimed the books were in public domain, when in actuality, under US Law, the titles had more than 30-years worth of copyright protection left. A complaint was filed with both Amazon and Lulu and the allegedly infringing books disappeared from sale. The original titles, by the original publishers remain available.

== Birth and death ==
Warren Billy Smith was born on January 24, 1931, in Leets, West Virginia. He died at age 72, on May 9, 2003, at his home on Dunham Street, in Clinton, Iowa. According to long-time personal friend and physician, Grey Musgrave Woodman MD, cause of death was congestive heart failure. Smith's ashes were scattered along the banks of the Mississippi River.

== Bibliography ==
Writing under Warren Smith:

- Finder's Keepers. Belmont, 1965
- Strange Women of the Occult. Popular Library, 1968
- Strange & Miraculous Cures. Ace Star Books, 1968
- Strange Powers of the Mind. Ace Star Books, 1968
- Strange ESP. Popular Library, 1969
- Into the Strange. Popular Library, 1969
- Abominable Snowmen. Award, 1969.
- Strange Murderers & Madmen. Popular Library, 1969
- Strange Abominable Snowmen. Popular Library, 1970.
- Strange Hexes. Popular Library, 1970.
- Talking to the Spirits: 10 World Famous Psychic Reveal Their Occult Secrets. Pinnacle, 1971
- Chains of Fear Delton Press, 1972
- The Strange Ones. Popular Library, 1972
- Triangle of the Lost. Zebra, 1975
- Myth and Mystery of Atlantis. Zebra, 1975
- Secret Forces of the Pyramids. Zebra, 1976
- The Hidden Secrets of the Hollow Earth. Zebra, 1976
- Lost Cities of the Ancients—Unearthed! Zebra, 1976
- Secrets of the Loch Ness Monster Zebra, 1976
- UFO Trek. Sphere, 1977
- Ancient Mysteries of the Mexican and Mayan Pyramids. Zebra, 1977
- The Book of Encounters. Zebra, 1977
- The Secret Origins of Bigfoot. Zebra, 1977
- This Hollow Earth, Sphere, 1977 (Reprint of 1972 Lancer Edition)

Writing under the pseudonym Eric Norman:

- The Under People. Lancer Books, 1969. also 1997 Japanese edition.
- Buried Treasure Guide. Award, 1970
- Gods, Demons & UFOs. Lancer Books, 1970.
- Gods, Demons and Space Chariots. Lancer, 1971
- Bitter Harvest. Delton Press, 1971
- The Strange Ones. Popular Library, 1972
- Predictions for 1973. Award, 1972.
- Predictions for 1974. Award, 1973
- Beyond the Strange. Popular Library, 1972
- This Hollow Earth. Lancer, 1972. Also Japanese edition.
- Gods and Devils from Outer Space. Lancer, 1973

Warren Smith with Brad Steiger/Eugene Olson:

- The Menace of Pep Pills. Merit Books, 1965
- Treasure Hunting. Ace Books, 1965
- What the Seers Predict for 1971. Lancer Books, 1970
- Satan's Assassins. Lancer, 1971
- Predictions for 1972. Lancer, 1971

Warren Smith with co-author Gabrial Green:

- Let's Face Facts About Flying Saucers. Popular Library, 1967

Writing under the pseudonym Paul Warren:

- The Sensual Male. Pinnacle, 1971

Writing under the pseudonym Robert E. Smith:

- Doc Anderson: We Live Many Lives. Paperback Library, 1971. P.
- Doc Anderson: The Healing Faith. Lancer, 1972. P.
- Doc Anderson: The Man Who Sees Tomorrow. Paperback Library, 1970

Writing under the pseudonym Barbara O'Brien:

- Martinis, Manhattans or ME? Zebra, 1974

Writing under the pseudonym Barbara Brooks:

- High Society. Pinnacle, 1974

Writing under the pseudonym Johnny Shearer:

- Sodom, U.S.A. Brandon House, 1965
- The Male Hustler. Brandon House, 1965

Writing under the pseudonym Joanna Warren (Novels)

- The Conrad Chronicles: Belle Mead. Zebra, 1978
- The Conrad Chronicles #2: The Dreamers. Zebra, 1980
- The Conrad Chronicles #3: The Destined. Zebra, 1980.

Writing under the pseudonym David Norman (Novels):

- The Frontier Rakers. Zebra, 1979
- The Frontier Rakers #2: The Forty Niners. Zebra, 1979
- Frontier Rakers #3: Gold Fever. Zebra, 1980
- Frontier Rakers #4: Silver City. Zebra, 1980
- Frontier Rakers: Montana Pass. Zebra, 1982
- Frontier Rakers: Santa Fe Dream. Zebra, 1983

Writing under the pseudonym Norma Warren (Novels):

- Trails West. Zebra, 1985

Writing under the pseudonym Jake Logan (Novels):

- High, Wide, and Deadly. Berkley Western, 1987
- Gold Fever, Berkley Western, 1989

Warren Smith with Harry Petheram:

- Guide to the Timex 1,000 and 2,000 computer. William C. Brown Company, Publishers, 1983
