= Man'ish Boy (A Raw & Beautiful Thing) =

Studio album by Darius Jones
- Released: 2009
- Recorded: April 27, 2009
- Studio: Systems Two, Brooklyn
- Genre: Jazz
- Length: 51:59
- Label: AUM Fidelity
- Producer: Darius Jones, Steven Joerg

Darius Jones chronology
Man'ish Boy (A Raw & Beautiful Thing) (2009)	Throat (2010)

Man'ish Boy (A Raw & Beautiful Thing) is the debut album by American jazz saxophonist Darius Jones, which was recorded in 2009 and released on the AUM Fidelity label. The cover art is a three-piece commission by Randal Wilcox entitled Portrait of a Man'ish Boy.

== Background ==
The record features his trio with pianist Cooper-Moore and drummer Rakalam Bob Moses, and reflects his early childhood growing up in the South. His experiences in church, particularly hearing gospel choirs were a deep inspiration for this project. Jones first met Moses at a performance while still in Virginia and joined forces with Cooper-Moore, a fellow Virginian, after moving to New York. Cooper-Moore was asked specifically to also play diddley bow, a one-wire stringed instrument with roots in the deep south via Africa. The album's bonus track features a 2008 live performance by Jones' regular working trio with bassists Adam Lane and drummer Jason Nazary.

== Reception ==
Professional ratings
Review scores
Source	Rating
AllMusic	4/5 stars

In his review for AllMusic, François Couture states "Darius Jones' recording debut as a leader turned out to be one of the jazz highlights of 2009. This sets the bar pretty high for the young saxophonist's next move."

The All About Jazz review by Troy Collins says "A phenomenal debut, Man'ish Boy (A Raw & Beautiful Thing) presents the singular artistry of Darius Jones; a new voice poised to receive widespread acclaim from the jazz underground."

In another review for All About Jazz, John Sharpe notes that "Jones has a talent for penning intensely emotional themes, which provide a fertile launching pad for his vibrato-laden alto preaching. Whether hollering in a multiphonic falsetto or punctuating his keening cries with gutbucket blasts, the saxophonist exudes complete authority."

The Point of Departure review by Ed Hazell describes the album as "one of the most impressive debuts in recent memory" and says "Amazingly, there’s little sense of two veterans supporting a younger, less experienced player. They sound like a trio of peers, which bodes well for this exciting new voice in the free jazz tradition."

== Track listing ==
All compositions by Darius Jones except as indicated

1. "Roosevelt" –1:14
2. "Cry Out" – 7:03
3. "We Are Unicorns" (Jones/Cooper-Moore) – 4:04
4. "Meekness" – 5:32
5. "Salty" (Jones/Cooper-Moore/Rakalam) – 2:51
6. "Chasing the Ghost" – 9:44
7. "Big Train Rollin'" (Jones/Rakalam) – 5:28
8. "Forgive Me" – 5:48

Bonus track

8. "Chaych" - 10:15

Recorded live at Roulette, New York City on August 6, 2008

== Personnel ==
- Darius Jones - alto sax
- Cooper-Moore – piano, diddley bow
- Rakalam Bob Moses – drums

Bonus track

- Darius Jones - alto sax
- Adam Lane – bass
- Jason Nazary – drums
