= Cosmic Lieder =

Studio album by Darius Jones & Matthew Shipp
- Released: 2011
- Recorded: October 29, 2010
- Studio: Systems Two, Brooklyn
- Genre: Jazz
- Length: 39:51
- Label: AUM Fidelity
- Producer: Steven Joerg

Darius Jones chronology
| Throat (2010) | Cosmic Lieder (2011) | Big Gurl (Smell My Dream) (2011) |

Matthew Shipp chronology
| SaMa Live in Moscow (2011) | Cosmic Lieder (2011) | Broken Partials (2011) |

Cosmic Lieder is an album by American jazz saxophonist Darius Jones and pianist Matthew Shipp, which was recorded in 2010 and released on the AUM Fidelity label. This 13-part song cycle was the first collaboration between Jones and Shipp.

== Reception ==
Professional ratings
Review scores
| Source | Rating |
|---|---|
| AllMusic | 4/5 stars |
| Down Beat | 4/5 stars |

In his review for AllMusic, Thom Jurek states "Cosmic Lieder isn't heavy or indulgent; it's deeply focused, curiously open-ended, and deeply satisfying."

The Down Beat review by Joe Tangari says "The brevity of Cosmic Lieder lends it the sense that this is just the beginning of the conversation and that there’s much more left to explore."

The All About Jazz review by Troy Collins states "Relatively brief and to the point, the oblique angles and abstruse detours of each concise tune invoke the art song tradition, making Cosmic Lieder an entirely appropriate title for this auspicious meeting."

In his review for JazzTimes Mike Shanley notes that "The 13 tracks on the duets project Cosmic Lieder sound like spontaneous inventions, but both men play pointedly and empathetically, and when they lock into a rhythmic groove it is especially rewarding."

The Point of Departure review by Brian Morton says "Lieder tend to deliver some kind of cyclical narrative, some sense of journey or soul’s progress, and that is exactly what these two remarkable musicians have created here: a sequence of out-of-body journeyings that you might reasonably imagine Sun Ra and John Gilmore making, significant as much in their silences and elisions as in anything actually said, full of dark matter and tonal dust, interrupted by violent outbursts, punctuated by calms that seem prepared to run on forever."

== Track listing ==
All compositions by Darius Jones & Matthew Shipp

1. "Bleed" - 3:08
2. "Ultima Thule" - 4:06
3. "Zillo Valla" - 3:23
4. "Multiverse" - 3:37
5. "Mandrakk" - 3:10
6. "Overvoid" - 2:37
7. "Weeja Dell" - 3:42
8. "Motherboxxx" - 2:43
9. "Black Lightning" - 2:17
10. "Nix Uotan" - 3:03
11. "Jonesy" - 2:21
12. "4-D Vision" - 3:07
13. "Geh-Jedollah" - 2:38

== Personnel ==
- Darius Jones – alto sax
- Matthew Shipp – piano
