= Matt Turner (cellist) =

American cellist

Matthew Turner is an American cellist who teaches jazz and improvisation at Lawrence University. He received his bachelor's degree from Lawrence University and his Masters of Music degree from the New England Conservatory of Music. His recordings have appeared on Illusions, Stellar, O.O. Discs, Asian Improv, Penumbra, Fever Pitch, Geode, Tautology and Meniscus Records.
