= In Order to Survive (album) =

Live album by William Parker
- Released: 1995
- Recorded: April 11, 1993 (tracks 1–3); Roulette, New York City; June 28, 1993 (track 4); Knitting Factory, New York City
- Genre: Jazz
- Length: 72:03
- Label: Black Saint
- Producer: William Parker

William Parker chronology
Flowers Grow in My Room (1994)	In Order to Survive (1995)	Testimony (1996)

In Order to Survive is an album by American jazz double bassist William Parker which was recorded live in 1993 and released on the Italian Black Saint label. After the album, Parker groups have been known as In Order To Survive. The cover art was made by Jeff Schlanger, a distinctive artist known for his "MusicWitness" paintings, which are created during live performances.

== Reception ==
Professional ratings
Review scores
Source	Rating
AllMusic	4/5 stars
The Penguin Guide to Jazz	3/4 stars
Tom Hull	A−

In his review for AllMusic, Michael G. Nastos states, "Some tour de force music is found here, which makes one wonder if these performances wouldn't have yielded another CD or three from this band of extraordinary avant-gardists." The Penguin Guide to Jazz says about the first track that "it is an immensely involving piece that opens up acres of improvisational territory for all the soloists."

== Track listing ==
All compositions by William Parker

1. "Testimony of No Future" – 38:47
2. "Anast In Crisis Mouth Full of Fresh Cut Flowers" – 6:55
3. "Testimony of the Stir Pot" – 20:07
4. "The Square Sun" – 6:13

== Personnel ==
- William Parker – bass
- Grachan Moncur III - trombone
- Rob Brown – alto sax
- Lewis Barnes – trumpet
- Cooper-Moore – piano
- Denis Charles – drums on 1–3
- Jackson Krall – drums on 4
