= Denis Charles =

Jazz drummer from the Virgin Islands

Denis Alphonso Charles (December 4, 1933 – March 26, 1998) was a jazz drummer.

== Biography ==
Charles was born in St. Croix, Virgin Islands, and first played bongos at age seven with local ensembles in the Virgin Islands. In 1945, he moved to New York, and gigged frequently around town. In 1954, he began working with Cecil Taylor, and the pair collaborated until 1958. Following this he played with Steve Lacy, Gil Evans, and Jimmy Giuffre. He befriended Ed Blackwell, and the two influenced each other.

He recorded with Sonny Rollins on a calypso-tinged set, and then returned to time with Lacy, with whom he played until 1964. He worked with Archie Shepp and Don Cherry in 1967, but heroin addiction saw him leave the record industry until 1971. In the 1970s and 1980s, he played regularly on the New York jazz scene with Frank Lowe, David Murray, Charles Tyler, Billy Bang, and others, and also played funk, rock, and traditional Caribbean music. He released three discs as a leader between 1989 and 1992, and died of pneumonia in his sleep in New York in 1998.

Charles died four days after a five-week European tour with the Borgmann/Morris/Charles (BMC) Trio, with Wilber Morris and Thomas Borgmann. His last concert with this trio took place at the Berlin's Willy-Brandt-Haus. With the BMC Trio he recorded some albums in his last two years. A fifth CD was released after he died: The Last Concert - Dankeschön, Silkheart Records, 1999.

In 2002, Veronique Doumbe released a film documentary, Denis A. Charles: An Interrupted Conversation, about the life of Charles.

== Discography ==
=== As leader or co-leader ===
- 1989: Queen Mary (Silkheart)
- 1991: Captain of the Deep (Eremite)
- 1992: A Scream for Charles Tyler (Adda)
- 1998: Drum Talk (Wobbly Rail) with Susie Ibarra

=== As sideman ===
With Cecil Taylor

- 1956: Jazz Advance (Transition)
- 1958: At Newport (Verve)
- 1959: Looking Ahead! (Contemporary)
- 1959: Love for Sale (United Artists)
- 1959: In Transition (Blue Note)
- 1960: The World of Cecil Taylor (Candid)
- 1960: Air (Candid)
- 1961: Cell Walk for Celeste (Candid)
- 1961: Jumpin' Punkins (Candid)
- 1961: New York City R&B (Candid) with Buell Neidlinger

With Steve Lacy

- 1958: Soprano Sax (Prestige)
- 1963: School Days
- 1979: Capers (hat Hut)
- 1982: The Flame (Soul Note)

With Gil Evans

- 1959: Great Jazz Standards (World Pacific)

With Sonny Rollins

- 1962: What's New? (RCA Victor)

With Archie Shepp

- 1967: The Magic of Ju-Ju (Impulse!)

With Peter Kuhn

- 1979: Livin' Right (Big City)
- 1981: The Kill (Soul Note)

With Billy Bang

- 1981: Rainbow Gladiator (Soul Note)
- 1982: Untitled Gift (Anima)
- 1982: Invitation (Soul Note)
- 1982: Bangception (hat MUSICS, 1983); reissued as Bangception, Willisau 1982 (HatOLOGY, 1998)
- 1988: Valve No. 10 (Soul Note)
- 1996: Spirits Gathering (CIMP)

With Jemeel Moondoc

- 1981: Konstanze's Delight (Soul Note)
- 1981: We Don't (Eremite, issued 2003)
- 1986: Nostalgia in Times Square (Soul Note)

With Wilber Morris and Charles Tyler

- 1981: Collective Improvisations (Bleu Regard, 1994)

With The Jazz Doctors (Rafael Garrett, Frank Lowe, Billy Bang)

- 1983: Intensive Care (Cadillac)

With Rob Brown

- 1990: Breath Rhyme (Silkheart)

With William Parker

- 1980: Through Acceptance of the Mystery Peace (Centering)
- 1995: In Order to Survive (Black Saint)

With John Blum (pianist)

- 1998: Astrogeny (Eremite, 2005)

With Raphe Malik

- 1999: ConSequences (Eremite)

With Sirone

- 2005: Live (Atavistic)
