= New World Pygmies =

Live album by Jemeel Moondoc & William Parker
- Released: 1999
- Recorded: July 27, 1998
- Venue: UMASS, Amherst, Massachusetts
- Genre: Jazz
- Length: 67:31
- Label: Eremite
- Producer: Michael Ehlers

Jemeel Moondoc chronology
| Fire in the Valley (1997) | New World Pygmies (1999) | Spirit House (2001) |

New World Pygmies is an album by American jazz saxophonist Jemeel Moondoc and bassist William Parker, which was recorded live at the Fire in the Valley Festival in 1998 and released on the Eremite label. It was Moondoc's first recorded encounter with Parker since Nostalgia in Times Square. "Another Angel Goes Home" is a tribute to drummer Denis Charles.

== Reception ==
Professional ratings
Review scores
| Source | Rating |
|---|---|
| AllMusic | 4.5/5 stars |
| The Penguin Guide to Jazz | 4/4 stars |

In his review for AllMusic, Steve Loewy states " Parker is a strong addition to any group, but he is mostly in a supporting role here, while Moondoc spurts forth line after line of creative inspiration... Moondoc is a sort of odd, underrated elder statesman of free music, occupying a role not dissimilar to that of Chicago tenor saxophonist Fred Anderson."

The Penguin Guide to Jazz says "People talk about the conversational quality of duo performance, but this is more like twin preachers in the mission hall, playing hard priest, soft priest alternately, the one threatening brimstone, the other promising redemption."

The All About Jazz review by Derek Taylor states "Moondoc and Parker have teamed up on numerous occasions since the mid-70s... Their familiarity rises immediately to the fore as both men jettison the fetters of decorum and play off each other with a visceral zeal."

== Track listing ==
1. "New World Pygmies" (Moondoc/Parker) - 17:03
2. "Huey Sees a Rainbow" (Parker) - 9:41
3. "Theme for Pelikan" (Parker) - 13:26
4. "Not Quite Ready for Prime Time" (Moondoc) - 12:58
5. "Another Angel Goes Home" (Parker) - 4:55
6. "Encore" (Moondoc/Parker) - 9:28

== Personnel ==
- Jemeel Moondoc - alto sax
- William Parker - bass
