= Cell Walk for Celeste =

Studio album by Cecil Taylor
- Released: 1988
- Recorded: January 9 & 10, 1961
- Genre: Jazz
- Length: 56:06
- Label: Candid

Cecil Taylor chronology
| Air (1960) | Cell Walk for Celeste (1988) | Jumpin' Punkins (1961) |

Cell Walk for Celeste is an album by Cecil Taylor recorded for the Candid label in January 1961 but not released until 1988. The album features performances by Taylor with Archie Shepp, Buell Neidlinger and Denis Charles. Additional recordings from these sessions were released on New York City R&B in 1971 and Jumpin' Punkins in 1987.

== Reception ==
Professional ratings
Review scores
| Source | Rating |
|---|---|
| Allmusic | 4.5/5 stars |
| The Penguin Guide to Jazz Recordings | 3.5/4 stars |

An AllMusic review states: "these Cecil Taylor small group arrangements find the pianist at an intriguing stage of his musical development, encompassing the traditional post-bop jazz of 'Jumpin' Punkins'..., and the more radical, yet still structured approach of the title track. Accompanied by an all-star lineup... Taylor's playing is like aural modern ballet—fractured, flowing, and lyrical."

== Track listing ==
All compositions by Cecil Tayor except as indicated

1. "Cell Walk for Celeste" [Take 1] – 11:32
2. "Davis" [Take 1] (Buell Neidlinger) – 3:12
3. "Section C" [Take 1] – 10:24
4. "Jumpin' Punkins" [Take 4] (Mercer Ellington) – 8:20
5. "Jumpin' Punkins" [Take 5] (Ellington) – 8:20
6. "Davis" [Take 3] – 5:20
7. "Cell Walk for Celeste" [Take 3] – 9:51
  - Recorded Nola's Penthouse Sound Studios, NYC, January 9 & 10, 1961

== Personnel ==
- Cecil Taylor – piano
- Archie Shepp – tenor saxophone
- Buell Neidlinger – bass
- Denis Charles – drums

Tracks 4,5 also includes:

- Billy Higgins – drums
- Clark Terry – trumpet
- Roswell Rudd – trombone
- Steve Lacy – soprano saxophone
- Charles Davis – baritone saxophone
