= Percept (disambiguation) =

Perception is the process of attaining awareness or understanding of sensory information.

Percept may also refer to:

- Percept (artificial intelligence), the input that an intelligent agent is perceiving at any given moment
- Percept, a term used in the pricing of data transfer

== See also ==
- Perception (disambiguation)
