= Two (Jemeel Moondoc album) =

Studio album by Jemeel Moondoc & Connie Crothers
- Released: 2012
- Recorded: December 22, 2011
- Studio: Connie's Loft, New York City
- Genre: Jazz
- Length: 53:53
- Label: Relative Pitch

Jemeel Moondoc chronology
Muntu Recordings (2009)	Two (2012)	Yellow Back Radio Breakdown (2013)

Two is an album by American jazz saxophonist Jemeel Moondoc and pianist Connie Crothers, which was recorded at Connie's Brooklyn loft in 2011 and released on Relative Pitch Records, a NYC based record label founded by Mike Panico and Kevin Reilly. It was the first time they recorded together and Moondoc's first studio recording in 15 years, the previous was Tri-P-Let.

== Reception ==
Professional ratings
Review scores
Source	Rating
The Free Jazz Collective	4/5 stars

The JazzTimes review by Mike Shanley states "Jazz duets often get described as 'conversations' between the two players, and this session clearly falls into that category. While a topic or two goes on a little too long, the overall discussion yields sharp points and empathetic support."

In a review for The Free Jazz Collective, Stan Zappa called Moondoc's contribution "a lasting reading of the alto saxophone's emotive power," and described Crothers as "a consummate musician and wonderfully able operator of the instrument." He commented: "There is an aural starkness, a blunt truthfulness on Two. Not a lot of sonic Vaseline rubbed on the mic to make it all sound dreamy."

Chris Searle of the Morning Star noted that "there's a moving empathy between the musicians which echoes all through the album," and remarked: "Moondoc's raw, impassioned tone tears at the heart and his tender melodic narrative rings like a love song of the lonely, while Crothers's keys answer his every testimony, making a palaver of musical flesh and spirit and a deeply affecting expression of private feeling expressed through sound."

== Track listing ==
All compositions by Moondoc / Crothers except where noted.

1. "Improvisation 1" – 6:25
2. "You Let Me Into Your Life" (Moondoc) – 11:48
3. "Improvisation 2" – 8:06
4. "Deep Friendship" (Crothers) – 5:31
5. "Improvisation 3" – 4:45
6. "Improvisation 4" – 5:55
7. "Improvisation 5" – 4:00
8. "Improvisation 6" – 7:23

== Personnel ==
- Jemeel Moondoc – alto sax
- Connie Crothers – piano
