= Lucky Man: Music from the Film =

Soundtrack album by Billy Bang
- Released: 2021
- Recorded: 2008
- Studio: Various locations in Vietnam
- Genre: Jazz, folk, world music
- Label: BBE Music / IF Music; BBE650ACD

Billy Bang chronology
Medicine Buddha (2014)	Lucky Man: Music from the Film (2021)

Lucky Man: Music from the Film is the soundtrack to the 2010 film Lucky Man, directed by Jean-Marie Boulet and Markus Hansen, documenting violinist and Vietnam veteran Billy Bang's 2008 visit to the country, 40 years after his participation in the Vietnam War as a tunnel rat. The album consists of field recordings created during Bang's travels across Vietnam, during which he interacted with local musicians, and came to appreciate the country's culture while at the same time seeking closure for the trauma he experienced during the war. The recording was released in 2021 on vinyl, CD, and as a digital download by BBE Music in association with IF Music.

== Reception ==
Professional ratings
Review scores
Source	Rating
All About Jazz	4/5 stars
Jazzwise	4/5 stars

In a review for Jazzwise, Kevin Le Gendre wrote: "Bang was nothing if not open-minded and his ability to blend a wide range of black music, from hard blues to open avant-garde, serve him well here in the company of skilled traditional players... This is deeply poignant music that offers invaluable catharsis to the horrors of war."

Karl Ackermann of All About Jazz stated: "The music is unlike anything else that Bang had recorded... Bang sometimes sounds like he has conquered his demons, but at other times, his pain is palpable... Bang's trademark acerbic but animated style is peppered with the violinist's inner dialog."

Writing for Strings Magazine, Greg Cahill called Bang's playing "poignant," and commented: "The personal nature of these field recordings has a healing effect and sheds new light on Bang’s own dogged pursuit of peace."

Jazz Journal's Matthew Wright described the music as "wonderful," with Bang "relating to and recognising the link between the Vietnamese style of playing and sound and his own." He praised the track titled "Mystery of the Mekong," featuring Bang's violin "soaring above a rich aggregation of strings, resonant cellos and almost rhapsodic support from the piano."

In an article for Truth and Lies, Justin Turford called the album "an extraordinary soundtrack to an extraordinary film about an extraordinary man," with music that is "unlike anything I've heard before." He singled out the track titled "Dan Da," on which Bang's violin joins Duc Dau's dan da, a stone lithophone, describing it as "the most perfect example of improvisational skill between two masters from different worlds," and noting: "Their elation and excitement is palpable as they push and drive each other to new heights and is a privilege to behold."

== Track listing ==
1. "Lucky Man: Introduction" – 4:10
2. "Billy playing with the Banhar Gong Group of Kuntum (traditional and improvised)" – 6:16
3. "Lucky Man: Flashback Tunnel Reflections" – 1:26
4. "Mystery of the Mekong" – 6:59
5. "Lucky Man: The Sun Rising - Introduction to Song for Don Cherry" – 1:03
6. "Song for Don Cherry" – 13:26
7. "Lucky Man: Flashback Memories" – 1:45
8. "New Saigon Phunk (Extended Version)" – 11:35
9. "Lucky Man: Traditional Vietnamese Catru Music" – 0:59
10. "Lucky Man: Billy Reflecting on Memories and Feelings" – 0:51
11. "Jungle Lullaby (Live at the Sax n'Art Club)" – 12:26
12. "Lucky Man: Quynh Anh Pham's Memories About Her Father" – 1:07
13. "Dan Da" – 9:45
14. "Lucky Man: Billy Speaking About Music and Art" – 0:47
15. "Lucky Man: Flashlight and a 45 Tunnel Memories" – 1:53
16. "Lucky Man Title Music: Vietnam 1967 Battle Composition" – 1:06
17. "Lucky Man: Teach Me Banhar" – 1:09
18. "Traditional Quan Ho" – 5:47
19. "Lucky Man: Billy Reflecting on America, Music and Being Left Alone" – 1:05
20. "Moments for the KIAMIA (Solo in a Hotel Interior Courtyard)" – 2:30
21. "Lucky Man: Quynh Anh Pham Lullaby" – 0:44
22. "New Saigon Phunk" – 5:51

== Personnel ==
- Billy Bang – violin, voice
- Banhar Gong Group (track 2)
- Hanoi Symphony Orchestra conducted by Tuan Phuong (track 4)
- Duc Dau – dan da (tracks 6, 8, 13, 22)
- Phu Dong Family Band (tracks 6, 8, 9, 22)
- Trần Mạnh Tuấn – saxophone (track 11)
- Quynh Anh Pham – voice (track 12)
- Cau River Singers – vocals (track 18)
