= Revolt of the Negro Lawn Jockeys =

Live album by Jemeel Moondoc
- Released: 2001
- Recorded: May 25, 2000
- Venue: New Age Cabaret, New York City
- Genre: Jazz
- Length: 47:25
- Label: Eremite
- Producer: Michael Ehlers

Jemeel Moondoc chronology
Spirit House (2001)	Revolt of the Negro Lawn Jockeys (2001)	New World Pygmies vol. 2 (2002)

Revolt of the Negro Lawn Jockeys is an album by American jazz saxophonist Jemeel Moondoc, which was recorded live at the 2000 Vision Festival and released on the Eremite label. It was a reunion with vibraphonist Khan Jamal, who recorded with Moondoc before on the album Konstanze's Delight. The quintet also features Nathan Breedlove on trumpet, John Voigt on bass and Codaryl Moffett on drums.

== Reception ==
Professional ratings
Review scores
Source	Rating
AllMusic	4.5/5 stars
The Penguin Guide to Jazz	3/4 stars

In his review for AllMusic, Steve Loewy states "Moondoc never loses focus, as the group marches forward with touches of Ayler, Coltrane, and Coleman, while Moondoc's distinct vision is always in the forefront. The audience's approval evidences the power of this group, who creates some of the best jazz of its kind."

The Penguin Guide to Jazz notes that "while the more upbeat music draws succour from some fine improvising, the ballad seems merely drear."

In a double review for JazzTimes, Daniel Piotrowski says "The cathartic beauty of 'You Let Me Into Your Life' features some of Moondoc's most potently languid and gripping playing, while the title track features some great interaction between him, Breedlove and Jamal."

The Wire placed the album in their "50 Records Of The Year 2001" list.

== Track listing ==
All compositions by Jemeel Moondoc

1. "Moon Mode" - 15:46
2. "You Let Me Into Your Life" - 13:17
3. "Revolt of the Negro Lawn Jockeys" - 15:22
4. "Encore" - 3:00

== Personnel ==
- Jemeel Moondoc - alto sax
- Nathan Breedlove - trumpet
- Khan Jamal - vibraphone
- Codaryl Moffett - drums
- John Voigt - bass
