= Muntu Recordings =

Compilation album by Jemeel Moondoc
- Released: 2009
- Recorded: April 20, 1975; April 17, 1977; March 30, 1979
- Venue: New York City
- Genre: Free jazz
- Length: 1:57:03
- Label: NoBusiness; NBCD 7–8–9
- Producer: Jemeel Moondoc, Danas Mikailionis, Valerij Anosov

Jemeel Moondoc chronology
Live at the Vision Festival (2003)	Muntu Recordings (2009)	Two (2012)

Muntu Recordings is a three-CD box-set compilation album by alto saxophonist Jemeel Moondoc and the ensemble known as Muntu. Disc 1 restores to circulation the group's debut album First Feeding, recorded in a New York City studio in 1977, and originally issued on vinyl that year by Moondoc's Muntu Records as the label's inaugural release. On First Feeding, Moondoc is joined by trumpeter Arthur Williams, pianist Mark Hennen, double bassist William Parker, and drummer Rashid Bakr. Disc 2 is a reissue of Muntu's second recording The Evening of the Blue Men, recorded live at St. Mark's Church in New York City in 1979, and originally issued on vinyl that year as the Muntu label's second and final release. On this recording, Moondoc is accompanied by trumpeter Roy Campbell, double bassist Parker, and drummer Bakr. Disc 3 is a previously unissued 1975 live recording from Ali's Alley in New York City featuring Moondoc, Parker, and Bakr. Muntu Recordings, released in 2009 by NoBusiness Records, also includes a 115-page book containing essays, photographs, and a complete Muntu sessionography.

== Reception ==
Professional ratings
Review scores
Source	Rating
All About Jazz	4.5/5 stars
The Free Jazz Collective	4.5/5 stars

The editors of The Village Voice included the album in their list of 2009's top jazz reissues.

In a review for All About Jazz, John Sharpe called the album "both historic document and vital music," and wrote: "It's a bulletin from another era, the late 1970s, a fertile period in free jazz history which has been sparsely documented. The set goes some way to redressing that imbalance."

Stef Gijssels of The Free Jazz Collective stated: "the nature of the music, the historical context, and the unbelievable quality and dedication with which No Business offered this music back to the world, make this already now one of the most recommended albums of the year."

Dusted Magazine's Derek Taylor called the album "revelatory," and commented: "The arrival of this important and opportune box set will hopefully foster resurgence in attention toward [Moondoc's] art and motivate new music-making in the process."

Writing for Signal to Noise, Michael Rosenstein noted that, with the album, NoBusiness "has made significant strides" in documenting the loft jazz era, remarking: "This fine set is a fitting testament to Muntu and the loft era."

In an article for JazzWord, Ken Waxman wrote: "Like many other lesser-known groups, Muntu was a band which epitomized a particular time. Since its deficiencies were circumstantial and economic despite a wealth of talent, the band should have attained lasting fame and financial rewards. It didn't, but at least this set captures Muntu at its musical heights."

Paris Transatlantic's Clifford Allen suggested that the album might help to restore Moondoc "to his place in the history of this music," and stated: "For anyone wanting a clearer picture of loft jazz, or just some undeniably heavy small-group jazz, the Muntu Recordings are essential."

== Track listings ==
All compositions by Jemeel Moondoc.

Disc 1

1. "First Feeding" – 5:09
2. "Flight (From the Yellow Dog)" – 13:57
3. "Theme for Milford (Mr. Body & Soul)" – 20:37
- Recorded on April 17, 1977, at Bob Blank Studios in New York City.

Disc 2

1. "The Evening of the Blue Men, Part 3 (Double Expo)" – 21:02
2. "Theme for Diane" – 19:39
- Recorded live on March 30, 1979, at Saint Mark's Church in New York City.

Disc 3

1. "Theme for Milford (Mr. Body & Soul)" – 36:35
- Recorded live on April 20, 1975, at Ali's Alley in New York City.

== Personnel ==
- Jemeel Moondoc – alto saxophone
- Arthur Williams – trumpet (disc 1)
- Roy Campbell – trumpet (disc 2)
- Mark Hennen – piano (disc 1)
- William Parker – double bass
- Rashid Bakr – drums
