= Live at Glenn Miller Café Vol 1 =

Live album by Jemeel Moondoc
- Released: 2002
- Recorded: April 15, 2002
- Venue: Glenn Miller Café, Stockholm
- Genre: Jazz
- Length: 60:41
- Label: Ayler

Jemeel Moondoc chronology
New World Pygmies vol. 2 (2002)	Live at Glenn Miller Café Vol 1 (2002)	Live in Paris (2003)

Live at Glenn Miller Café Vol 1 is an album by American jazz saxophonist Jemeel Moondoc, which was recorded in Stockholm and released on Ayler Records, a Swedish label founded by Jan Ström and Åke Bjurhamn. Moondoc leads a trio with bassist William Parker and drummer Hamid Drake. The rhythm section had recorded the studio album ...and William Danced a few hours earlier with local saxophonist Anders Gahnold.

== Reception ==
Professional ratings
Review scores
Source	Rating
AllMusic	4/5 stars
The Penguin Guide to Jazz Recordings	3.5/4 stars
Tom Hull – on the Web	A−

In his review for AllMusic, Steve Loewy stated: "Moondoc is an underrated heavyweight of the saxophone: The elder statesman drinks from the well of Ornette Coleman, but Moondoc plies his own sound with a sighing lyricism that lures the listener into his den."

The authors of The Penguin Guide to Jazz Recordings noted the "exceptional understanding" between the musicians, and remarked: "the interest lies in the moment-to-moment interaction rather than any sense of destination or progress."

JazzWord's Ken Waxman called the album "a representative hour of high class, New York-based free improv sound," and praised the bassist's contribution, writing: "Often flashing by at supersonic speeds, you can note Parker snapping his strings as he illuminates both the high and low parts of his axe and, at times, he seems to be playing duets with himself."

== Track listing ==
All compositions by Jemeel Moondoc

1. "Hi-Rise" - 30:55
2. "Blues for my People" - 29:46

== Personnel ==
- Jemeel Moondoc - alto sax
- William Parker - bass
- Hamid Drake - drums
