= The World of Cecil Taylor =

Studio album by Cecil Taylor
- Released: 1961
- Recorded: October 12–13, 1960
- Genre: Avant-garde jazz
- Length: 47:21
- Label: Candid

Cecil Taylor chronology
Love for Sale (1959)	The World of Cecil Taylor (1961)	Air (1960)

The World of Cecil Taylor is an album by Cecil Taylor, recorded for the Candid label in October 1960. The album features performances by Taylor with Archie Shepp, Buell Neidlinger and Denis Charles. Alternate takes from these sessions were released on Air in 1987. A 1971 reissue of the original album on the Barnaby label was also titled Air.

Some of the tracks the pianist chose to release on this album were improvised, single-take pieces, while others were the result of multiple takes. The track titled "Air" required 29 takes before being approved by Taylor.

== Reception ==
Professional ratings
Review scores
Source	Rating
AllMusic	4.5/5 stars
The Penguin Guide to Jazz Recordings	4/4 stars
The Rolling Stone Jazz Record Guide	5/5 stars
DownBeat	4/5 stars

In a review for AllMusic, Brian Olewnick wrote: "One can only imagine what the reaction of the average jazz fan was in 1960 when this session was recorded. This is a wonderful document from early in Taylor's career, when he was midway between modernist approaches to standard material and his own radical experiments that would come to full fruition a few years hence... What's extra amazing is how deeply entrenched the blues feel and pulse are in this music, already bound for the further reaches of abstraction. They never left Taylor, although many listeners have difficulty discerning them. This session, which has been released under numerous guises, is an especially fine introduction to his work, keeping enough of a foot in 'traditional' jazz forms to offer one purchase while dangling breathtaking visions of the possible within one's reach. A classic recording that belongs in anyone's collection."

DownBeat assigned the album 4 stars. The review states, "At his best I hear Taylor creating a spontaneous, improvised Third Stream music — i.e., a true synthesis of material from jazz and contemporary “classical” music. In itself this is a formidable accomplishment, and Taylor is, to my knowledge, the only musician currently playing (as opposed to composing) this type of music at such a high level".

== Track listing ==
All compositions by Cecil Tayor except as indicated

1. "Air" [Take 28] - 8:41
2. "This Nearly Was Mine" [Take 1] (Oscar Hammerstein II, Richard Rodgers) - 10:51
3. "Port of Call" [Take 2] - 4:22
4. "E.B." [Take 2] - 9:59
5. "Lazy Afternoon" (John Latouche, Jerome Moross) - 14:52

- Recorded Nola's Penthouse Sound Studios, NYC, October 12 & 13, 1960

== Personnel ==
- Cecil Taylor - piano
- Buell Neidlinger - bass
- Denis Charles - drums
- Archie Shepp - tenor saxophone (tracks 1 & 5)
