= The Astral Revelations =

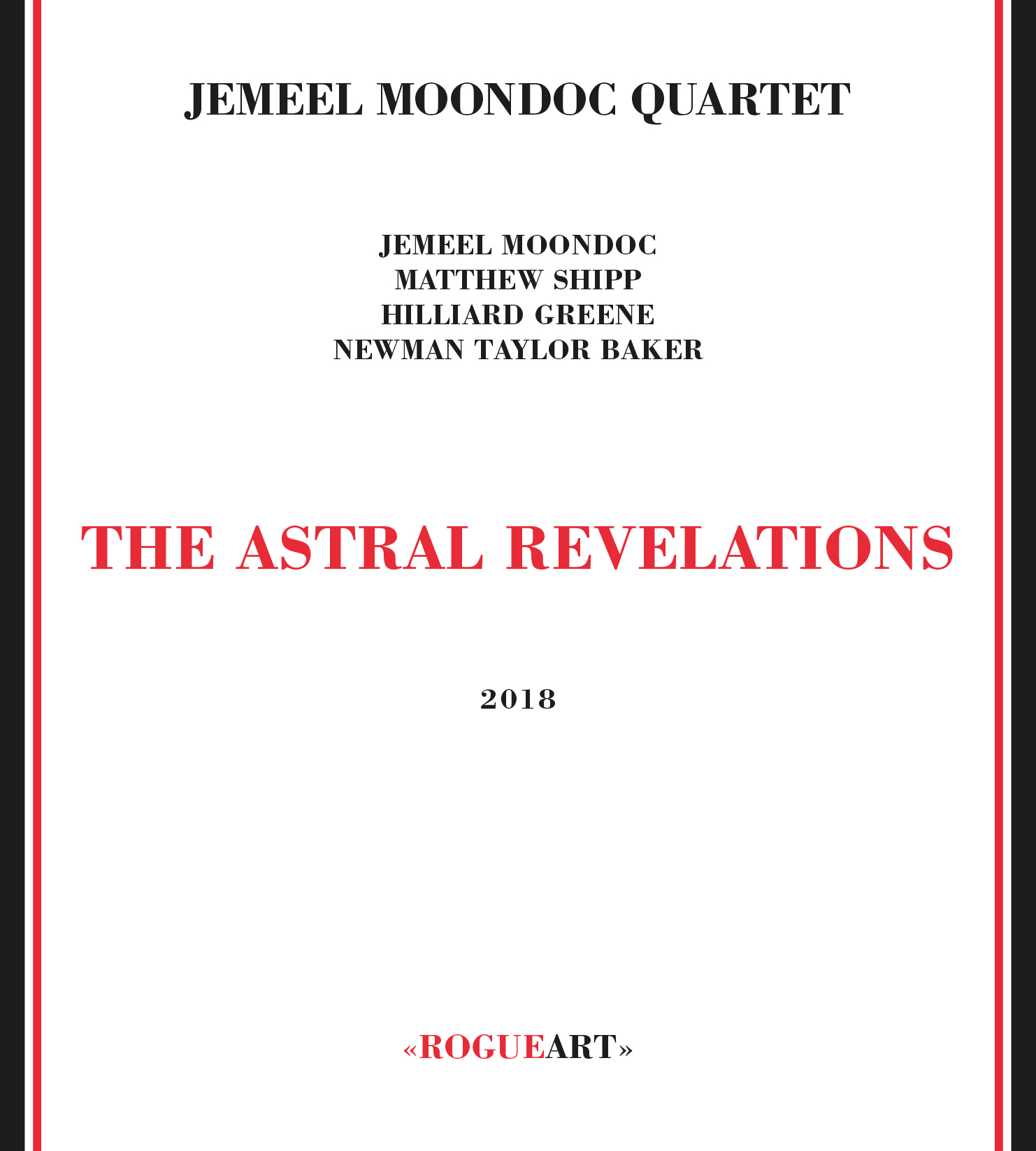

Live album by Jemeel Moondoc Quartet
- Released: 2018
- Recorded: February 5, 2016
- Venue: Bimhuis, Amsterdam, Netherlands
- Genre: Free jazz
- Length: 53:26
- Label: RogueArt; ROG-0081

Jemeel Moondoc chronology
Cosmic Nickelodeon (2016)	The Astral Revelations (2018)

The Astral Revelations is a live album by the Jemeel Moondoc Quartet, led by saxophonist Moondoc, and featuring pianist Matthew Shipp, double bassist Hilliard Greene, and drummer Newman Taylor Baker. Moondoc's final recording prior to his death in 2021, it was recorded on February 5, 2016, at the Bimhuis in Amsterdam, and was released in 2018 by RogueArt.

== Reception ==
Professional ratings
Review scores
Source	Rating
All About Jazz	5/5 stars
The Free Jazz Collective	4/5 stars

Ken Weiss of Cadence included the album in his list of the "Top Ten Recordings" of 2018.

In a review for All About Jazz, John Sharpe awarded the album a full 5 stars, stating that it "breathes new vitality into the legacy of the loft jazz era," and writing: "For those who haven't caught up with Moondoc before, this is the place to start."

The Free Jazz Collective's Stef Gijssels called the album "great stuff," and commented: "Warmth and openness are the key ingredients of this music, inviting listeners in without any degree of shock or alienation, giving them a common platform of familiarity to explore its boundaries, but without overdoing it."

Steve Loewy of The New York City Jazz Record described the album as "a splendid, though not critical, addition to [Moondoc's] discography," and remarked: "Moondoc does not set out to impress but, in his understated way, does exactly that: his performances are devoid of grandstanding, instead focusing on tightly structured group playing and intense solos."

Writing for Point of Departure, Ed Hazell noted that the album "ranks with [Moondoc's] best efforts, an example of the unquenchable creative fire that lasted into his final years."

== Track listing ==
All compositions by Jemeel Moondoc.

1. "Cosmic Nickelodeon" – 17:07
2. "Blues for Katie" – 14:44
3. "Here Now, Gone Now" – 14:17
4. "Ornette Gone Bye" – 7:16

== Personnel ==
- Jemeel Moondoc – alto saxophone
- Matthew Shipp – piano
- Hilliard Greene – double bass
- Newman Taylor Baker – drums
