= Air (Cecil Taylor album) =

Studio album by Cecil Taylor
- Released: 1990
- Recorded: October 12–13, 1960
- Genre: Jazz
- Label: Candid

Cecil Taylor chronology
The World of Cecil Taylor (1960)	Air (1990)	Cell Walk for Celeste (1961)

Air is an album by Cecil Taylor recorded for the Candid label in October 1960. The album features performances by Taylor with Archie Shepp, Buell Neidlinger, Denis Charles and Sunny Murray on alternate takes of material released on The World of Cecil Taylor (1960).

== Reception ==
Professional ratings
Review scores
Source	Rating
Allmusic	4.5/5 stars
The Penguin Guide to Jazz Recordings	3.5/4 stars

A review at AllMusic states: "Avant-garde icon Cecil Taylor has a superfluity of gems in his catalogue, but his recordings from the early 1960s have a special significance in that they represent the pianist's transition from a traditional post-bop approach to his more abstract stylings. Lyrical, bluesy, and driven by bold improvisation, 1960's Air is an excellent example of Taylor's early work. Along with saxophonist Archie Shepp (who sits in on two numbers) and a sharp, tight-knit rhythm section, Taylor can be heard stretching the jazz canvas of the era, forming the radical vocabulary he would master on landmark albums like 1966's Unit Structures. Air is a must for Taylor fans, and is also a good entry point for those who find his later work too jarring or abrasive."

== Track listing ==
All compositions by Cecil Tayor

1. "Number One" [Take 1] – 12:35
2. "Number One" [Take 2] – 8:36
3. "Air" [Take 9] – 17:34
4. "Air" [Take 21] – 11:24
5. "Air" [Take 24] – 10:21
6. "Port of Call" [Take 3] – 4:25
- Recorded Nola's Penthouse Sound Studios, NYC, October 12 & 13, 1960

== Personnel ==
- Cecil Taylor – piano
- Buell Neidlinger – bass
- Archie Shepp – tenor saxophone (tracks 3–5)
- Sunny Murray – drums (tracks 1–2)
- Denis Charles – drums (tracks 3–5)
