= Live in Paris (Jemeel Moondoc album) =

Live album by Jemeel Moondoc
- Released: 2003
- Recorded: March 23, 1999
- Venue: Espace 1789, Saint-Ouen
- Genre: Jazz
- Length: 66:24
- Label: Cadence Jazz
- Producer: Jemeel Moondoc

Jemeel Moondoc chronology
Live at Glenn Miller Café Vol 1 (2002)	Live in Paris (2003)	Live at the Vision Festival (2003)

Live in Paris is an album by American jazz saxophonist Jemeel Moondoc, which was recorded in 1999 at the Banlieues Bleues Festival, in the northern suburbs of Paris, and released on Cadence Jazz. His All-Stars quintet features two longtime associates: trumpeter Roy Campbell and bassist William Parker, and two members of the Jus Grew Orchestra: saxophonist Zane Massey and drummer Cody Moffett. It was the first of Moondoc's small group releases with another saxman.

== Reception ==
Professional ratings
Review scores
Source	Rating
The Penguin Guide to Jazz	3/4 stars

The JazzTimes review by Aaron Steinberg says "The saxophonist tempers a Coleman-like astringency with an earthiness and a touch of sweetness. The latter quality comes out when Moondoc allows himself to improvise melodically."

The Penguin Guide to Jazz notes that "Much of the emphasis falls on the leader, but Massey's rugged tenor and Campbell's yelping trumpet makes their presence felt as well."

== Track listing ==
All compositions by Jemeel Moondoc

1. "HiRise" - 11:47
2. "Not Quite Ready for Prime Time" - 22:34
3. "We Don't" - 17:13
4. "One Down, One Up" - 14:50

== Personnel ==
- Jemeel Moondoc - alto sax
- Cody Moffett - drums
- William Parker - bass
- Roy Campbell - trumpet
- Zane Massey - tenor sax
