= What It Is (Mal Waldron album) =

Studio album by Mal Waldron
- Released: 1982
- Recorded: November 15, 1981
- Genre: Jazz
- Length: 37:14
- Label: Enja
- Producer: Horst Weber

Mal Waldron chronology
Live at Dreher, Paris 1981 (1981)	What It Is (1982)	One Entrance, Many Exits (1982)

What It Is is an album by American jazz pianist Mal Waldron recorded in 1981 and released by the Enja label.

== Reception ==
The Allmusic review by Ron Wynn awarded the album 3 stars stating "dauntless piano".

Professional ratings
Review scores
Source	Rating
Allmusic	3/5 stars

== Track listing ==
All compositions by Mal Waldron except as indicated

1. "Charlie Parker's Last Supper" (Clifford Jordan) — 7:14
2. "Hymn from the Inferno" — 12:02
3. "What It Is" — 17:58
  - Recorded at Vanguard Studios in New York City on November 15, 1981

== Personnel ==
- Mal Waldron — piano
- Clifford Jordan — tenor saxophone
- Cecil McBee — bass
- Dannie Richmond — drums
