= Captain of the Deep =

Live album by Denis Charles
- Released: March 26, 1998
- Recorded: May 9, 1991
- Venue: De Effenaar Cultural Centre, Eindhoven
- Genre: Jazz
- Length: 72:39
- Label: Eremite
- Producer: Michael Ehlers

Denis Charles chronology
Queen Mary (1990)	Captain of the Deep (1998)	A Scream for Charles Tyler (1992)

Captain of the Deep is an album by the American jazz drummer Denis Charles, which was recorded live in 1991 at the Zuid-Nederlands Jazz Festival and released in 1998 on the Eremite label.

The album was issued to the public on the day Charles died.

== Reception ==
Professional ratings
Review scores
Source	Rating
AllMusic	4.5/5 stars
The Penguin Guide to Jazz	3/4 stars

The album was listed as Cadence Magazine's reviewers' choice best recording, and also appeared in the JazzIz critics list of top ten recordings for 1998.

In his review for AllMusic, Steve Loewy wrote, "With a sound often approximating the work of early Ornette Coleman, the two horns spurt attractively dissonant themes, after which the four players turn out repeatedly fascinating solos and interactive lines."

Amiri Baraka called Charles's solos "hip, self-contained, quirky links and carriers of the whole," and noted that "behind Ayler-blunt melodies, straight-ahead timbre, the unique daring simplicity of Charles's rhythmic motive force, Deep has lovely moments."

== Track listing ==
1. "We Don't" (Traditional) - 14:04
2. "Mota" (Breedlove) - 13:37
3. "Round About" (Breedlove / Charles / DeJoode / Moondoc) - 15:38
4. "Jamaj's" (de Joode) - 9:40
5. "Rob" (Breedlove) - 13:35
6. "Tobie Continyou" (de Joode) - 6:05

== Personnel ==
- Denis Charles - drums
- Nathan Breedlove - trumpet
- Wilber de Joode - double bass
- Jemeel Moondoc - alto saxophone
