= We Don't =

Studio album by Jemeel Moondoc
- Released: 2003
- Recorded: July 29, 1981
- Studio: Tucasa Sound Studio, New York City
- Genre: Jazz
- Length: 42:35
- Label: Eremite
- Producer: Michael Ehlers

Jemeel Moondoc chronology
The Intrepid Live in Poland (1981)	We Don't (2003)	Judy's Bounce (1982)

We Don't is an album by American jazz saxophonist Jemeel Moondoc with drummer Denis Charles, which was recorded in 1981 but not issued until 2003 by the Eremite label. The title track is a traditional Caribbean tune.

== Reception ==
Professional ratings
Review scores
Source	Rating
AllMusic	4.5/5 stars
The Penguin Guide to Jazz	3/4 stars

In his review for AllMusic, Steve Loewy states "Jemeel Moondoc and Denis Charles are in outstanding form, with the saxophonist wailing passionately for the length of the album and the drummer egging him on with characteristic panache."The Penguin Guide to Jazz notes that "Saxophone and drums is a tough discipline, sanctified by John Coltrane's duets with Rashied Ali. These are harsher and more abstract sessions, and the more realistic parallel might be Ornette Coleman and Ed Blackwell."

The All About Jazz review by Clifford Allen states "As far as continua are concerned, We Don't is neither fire- breathing heaviness nor ice-cold experimentation, but a creative and energetic ride through the diction of two of the most original voices on their instruments."

The JazzTimes review by Bill Shoemaker says "A passionate duo exchange with alto saxophonist Jemeel Moondoc, We Don't is a fine companion volume to a 1991 recording issued under Charles' leadership, Captain of the Deep, which also featured Moondoc."

== Track listing ==
All compositions by Jemeel Moondoc except as indicated

1. "We Don't" (Traditional) - 9:31
2. "Home" - 11:54
3. "Judy's Bounce" - 9:29
4. "We Do" - 11:41

== Personnel ==
- Jemeel Moondoc - alto sax
- Denis Charles - drums
