= Live at the Vision Festival =

Live album by Jemeel Moondoc
- Released: 2003
- Recorded: June 1, 2001
- Venue: Knitting Factory, New York City
- Genre: Jazz
- Length: 45:58
- Label: Ayler

Jemeel Moondoc chronology
Live in Paris (2003)	Live at the Vision Festival (2003)	Muntu Recordings (2009)

Live at the Vision Festival is an album by American jazz saxophonist Jemeel Moondoc, which was recorded live at the 2001 Vision Festival and released on Ayler Records, a Swedish label founded by Jan Ström and Åke Bjurhamn. It was the second recording by the Jus Grew Orchestra, a large ensemble founded by Moondoc in the early 80s.

== Reception ==
Professional ratings
Review scores
Source	Rating
AllMusic	3/5 stars
The Penguin Guide to Jazz	3/4 stars

The AllMusic review states "Despite some fine soloing, including a typically joyous flight of fancy from Moondoc himself and several impressive features for tenor saxophonist Zane Massey, it's a relatively no-risk affair, underpinned by a rhythm section that seems at times to be just going through the motions."

The Penguin Guide to Jazz says "The music is fine and fiery... The sound isn't exceptional but gives a faithful representation of Moondoc's philosophy."

== Track listing ==
All compositions by Jemeel Moondoc

1. "Opulent Continuum" - 8:43
2. "The Blue Dog - Blues for Earl Cross" - 14:32
3. "Variation of a Riff" - 14:06
4. "Cosmic Tabernacle" - 8:36

== Personnel ==
- Jemeel Moondoc - alto sax, conduction
- Zane Massey - tenor sax
- Michael Marcus - baritone sax
- Roy Campbell - trumpet
- Nathan Breedlove - trumpet
- Steve Swell - trombone
- Tyrone Hill - trombone
- Bern Nix - guitar
- John Voigt - bass
- Gerald Cleaver - drums
