= Lenny Popkin =

American saxophonist (born 1941)

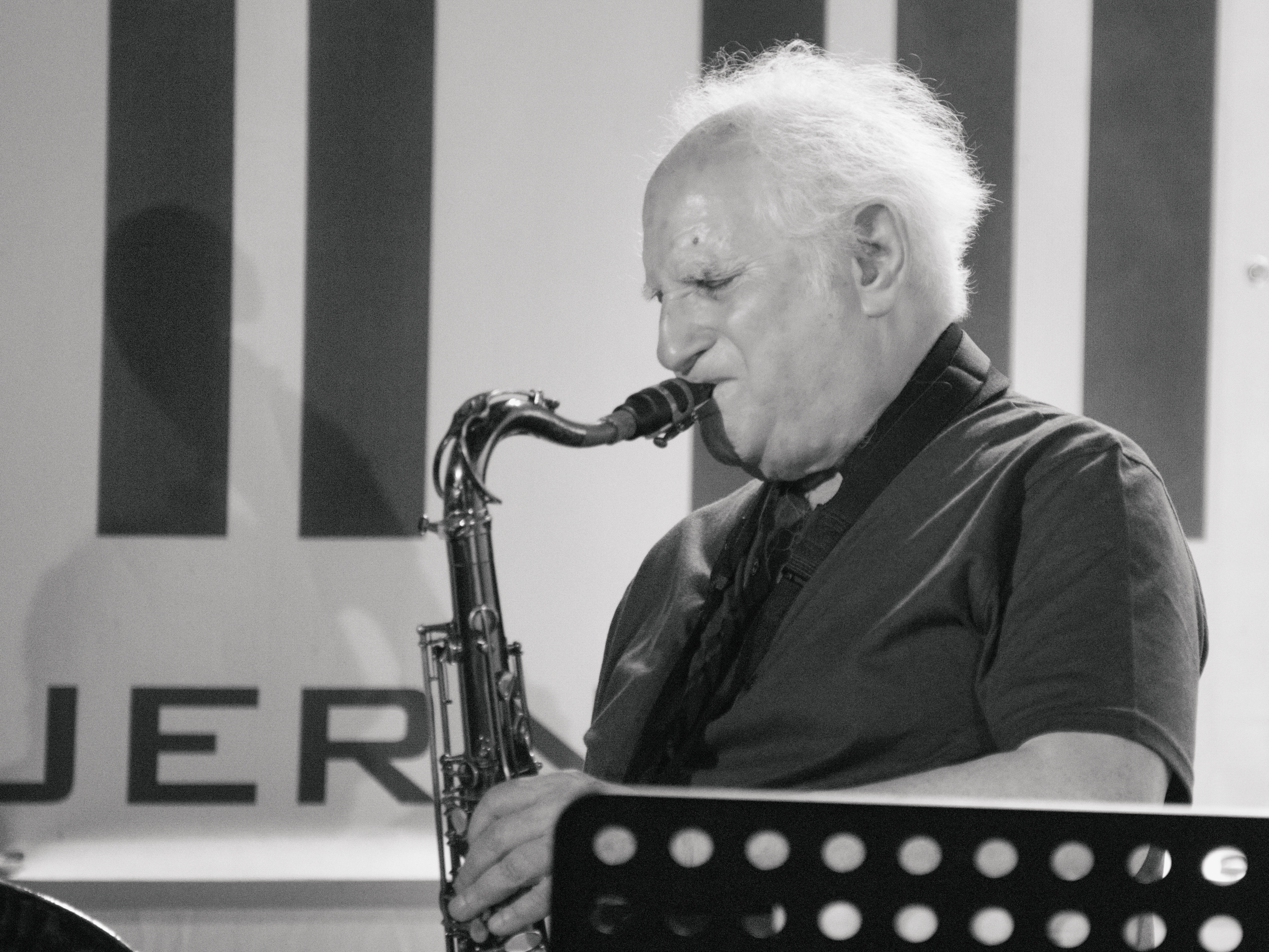
- Lenny Popkin performing with his trio in the Stadel at the INNtöne Jazzfestival 2024.

Background information
- Born: May 30, 1941 (age 84); New York
- Genres: Jazz
- Occupations: Musician, Composer
- Instrument: Tenor Saxophone
- Years active: 1959–present
- Labels: New Artists
- Spouse: Carol Tristano

Lenny Popkin (born May 30, 1941) is a saxophonist whose style is most closely associated with the school of Lennie Tristano, with whom he studied and performed in the 1960s. He is married to Tristano's daughter, Carol.

He has recorded extensively, often in the company of pianist Connie Crothers, and released recordings on her New Artists record label.

== Early life ==
Popkin was born on May 30, 1941, in New York. He initially studied violin, switching to saxophone in his teens. He attended Lennox School of Jazz in 1959, and Brandeis University, where he obtained Bachelor of Arts (1963), and Master of Fine Arts (1966) degrees.

== Career ==
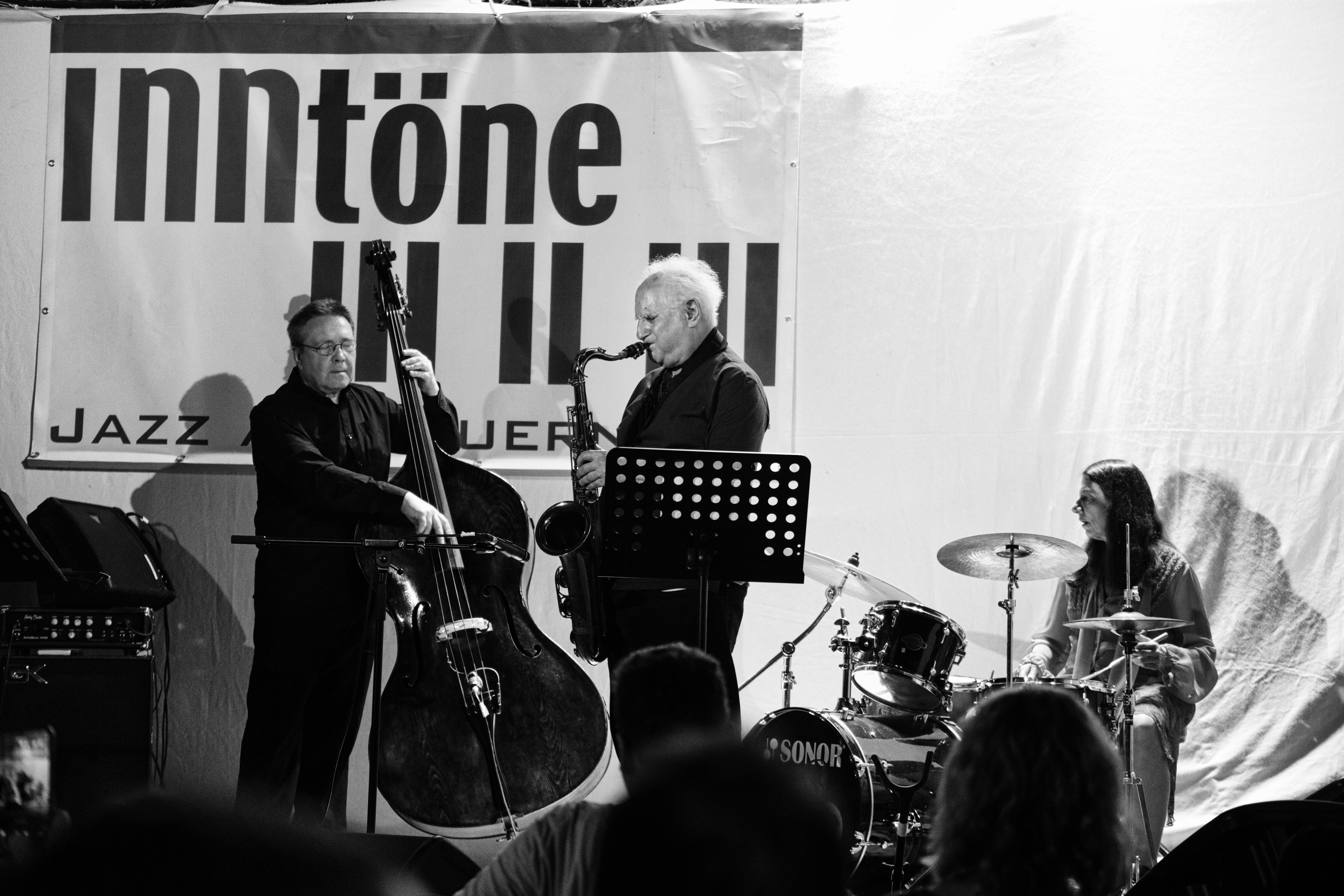
The Lenny Popkin Trio in the Stadel at the INNtöne Jazzfestival 2024.

Popkin studied with Lennie Tristano in the 1960s, joining his quartet in 1968.

Following Tristano's death in 1978, Popkin co-produced, along with Connie Crothers, the Lennie Tristano Memorial Concert at Town Hall, New York, and co-founded the Lennie Tristano Jazz Foundation.

Popkin is married to Lennie Tristano's daughter, drummer Carol Tristano, who is a regular member of his trios. He has recorded at least sixteen albums, frequently with Connie Crothers on piano until her death in 2016. He co-founded New Artists record label with Crothers.

== Discography ==
- 1959. The Lenox Jazz School Concert-August 29, 1959, FreeFactory 064
- 1979. Falling Free, Choice 1027
- 1979. Lennie Tristano Memorial Concert, Jazz Records 3
- 1984. True Fun, Jazz Records 7 (with Eddie Gomez and Liz Gorrill)
- 1988. Love Energy, New Artists 1005 (with Connie Crothers)
- 1989. New York Night, New Artists 1008 (with Connie Crothers)
- 1989. In Motion, New Artists 1013 (with Connie Crothers)
- 1993. Jazz Spring, New Artists 1017 (with Connie Crothers)
- 1997. Session, New Artists 1027 (with Connie Crothers)
- 1997. Lenny Popkin, LifeLine Records 101
- 2004. New York Moment, LifeLine/Paris Jazz Corner Productions 982 941-9 (with Eddie Gomez, Carol Tristano)
- 2007. Belleville, Cristal Records 0714 (with Gilles Naturel)
- 2010. 317 East 32nd, Candid Records 71027
- 2011. Live at Inntöne Festival, PAO Records 11160
- 2012. Time Set, Paris Jazz Corner Productions/LifeLine 103
- 2023. Sax Section LifeLine Records LR 105 CD.

Main sources
