= Connie Crothers =

American jazz pianist

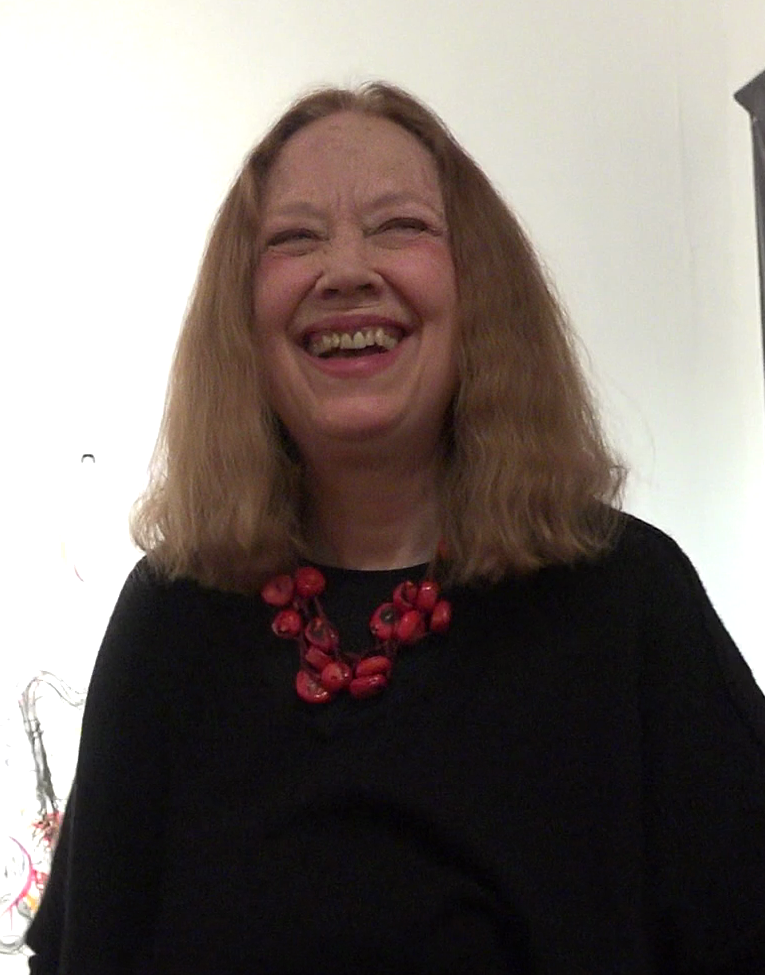
- Connie Crothers at a gallery on the Lower East Side, New York City, 2015

Background information
- Born: May 2, 1941; Palo Alto, California, U.S.
- Died: August 13, 2016 (aged 75) New York City, New York, U.S.
- Genres: Avant-garde jazz, free jazz
- Occupations: Musician, composer, educator
- Instrument: Piano
- Years active: 1972–2016
- Labels: SteepleChase, New Artists
- Formerly of: Lennie Tristano, Richard Tabnik
- Website: www.conniecrothers.net

Connie Crothers (May 2, 1941 – August 13, 2016) was an American jazz improviser and pianist.

== Early life ==
Crothers began studying classical piano at age 9 and went on to major in composition at the University of California, Berkeley. At Berkeley, her teachers emphasized "procedure and structure" and "compositional rigor" over emotional expression, which did not sit well with Crothers. Inspired by his recording of "C Minor Complex," one of the first examples on record of free improvisation, she relocated to New York City to become a student of Lennie Tristano.

== Later life and career ==
After Tristano's death in November 1978, Crothers founded the Lennie Jazz Foundation and recorded a memorial concert album in his honor.

In 1982, she recorded an album with drummer Max Roach for New Artists Records, a label she and Roach founded. She also recorded in groups with, among others, Richard Tabnik and Cameron Brown.

In the fall of 2013, while Connie Crothers was struggling with terminal cancer, she invited Dhamma Ace Yamashita, the only Japanese disciple from Japan, to her private studio and conducted a recording session for several days. Dhamma Ace Yamashita remembers, "At the recording sessions, Connie Crothers' concentration was cosmologically deep. We communicated without a single word; our souls became one, completely within our music."

Crothers died of lung cancer in Manhattan on August 13, 2016.

== Discography ==
=== As leader/co-leader ===
Year recorded	Title	Label	Notes
1974	Perception	SteepleChase	Trio, with Joe Solomon (bass), Roger Mancuso (drums)
1980?	Solo	Jazz	
1982	Swish	New Artists	Duo, with Max Roach (drums)
1984	Concert at Cooper Union	Orchard	Solo piano
1985	Duo Dimension	New Artists	Duo, with Richard Tabnik (alto sax)
1988	Love Energy	New Artists	Quartet, with Lenny Popkin (tenor sax), Cameron Brown (bass), Carol Tristano (drums)
1989	New York Night	Orchard	Quartet, with Lenny Popkin (tenor sax), Cameron Brown (bass), Carol Tristano (drums)
1989	In Motion	Orchard	Quartet, with Lenny Popkin (tenor sax), Cameron Brown (bass), Carol Tristano (drums)
1993	Jazz Spring	Orchard	Quartet, with Lenny Popkin (tenor sax), Cameron Brown (bass), Carol Tristano (drums)
1993–94	Deep into the Center	New Artists	Duo, with Roger Mancuso (drums)
1993–96	Music from Everyday Life	New Artists	Solo piano
1996	Session	New Artists	Quartet, with Lenny Popkin (tenor sax), Rich Califano (bass), Carol Tristano (drums)
1997?	Just for the Joy of It		with Bob Casanova
1998–99	Ontology	New Artists	Quartet, with Richard Tabnik (alto sax), Sean Smith (bass), Roger Mancuso (drums)
1999?	Notes from New York		
2005	Music Is a Place	New Artists	Quartet, with Richard Tabnik (alto sax), Ratzo Harris (bass), Roger Mancuso (drums)
2005	Live at Outpost Performance Space	New Artists	Quartet, with Richard Tabnik (alto sax), Ratzo Harris (bass), Roger Mancuso (drums); in concert
2007?	Conversations	New Artists	
2010?	Session at 475 Kent	Mutable Music	
2011	Two	Relative Pitch	Duo, with Jemeel Moondoc (saxophone)
2011?	Live at the Freight	New Artists	Duo, with Jessica Jones (tenor sax); in concert
2011?	Spontaneous Suites for Two Pianos	RogueArt	Duo, with David Arner (piano)
2012?	Hippin'	New Artists	
2013	UNISON	A.Y.L	Duo, with Dhamma Ace Yamashita (guitar)
2013	Synchronicity	A.Y.L	Duo, with Dhamma Ace Yamashita (guitar)
2014	Concert In Paris	New Artists	Solo piano
2016	Live At The Stone	Imprec	Duo, with Pauline Oliveros (accordion, electronics, voice)

=== As sidewoman ===
- 1992? Lennie Tristano Memorial Concert, Tristanos Disciples
- 1999? The Way I Am, Linda Satin
- 2002? Primal Elegance, Bud Tristano
