= New World Pygmies vol. 2 =

Live album by Jemeel Moondoc & William Parker
- Released: 2002
- Recorded: CD 1: November 5, 2000; CD 2: November 4, 2000
- Venue: CD 1: Spotlight Room, Madison, Wisconsin; CD 2: Velvet Lounge, Chicago
- Genre: Jazz
- Length: 140:09
- Label: Eremite
- Producer: Michael Ehlers

Jemeel Moondoc chronology
| Revolt of the Negro Lawn Jockeys (2001) | New World Pygmies vol. 2 (2002) | Live at Glenn Miller Café Vol 1 (2001) |

New World Pygmies vol. 2 is a double album by American jazz saxophonist Jemeel Moondoc and bassist William Parker, which was recorded live in 2000 and released on the Eremite label. The first disc documents a duo performance from Madison, while the second includes guest drummer Hamid Drake from a Chicago set at the Velvet Lounge.

== Reception ==
Professional ratings
Review scores
| Source | Rating |
|---|---|
| The Penguin Guide to Jazz | 3/4 stars |

The Penguin Guide to Jazz states "An intermittently powerful document which, as with so much in a obsessively documented area, sometimes feels like too much has been taken down."

In a review for One Final Note, Scott Hreha wrote: "by all accounts, this was the point where Moondoc and Parker really hit their communicative stride. The discs certainly support this conclusion, offering full views of the duo in two distinct, yet wholly intimate settings... Even if you weren't fortunate enough to catch this truly dynamic duo in person, Eremite comes through once again with a soul-saver of a two-disc set. And with the clear, warm recording fidelity found on both discs, you might find yourself forgetting that you're one step removed from the real thing."

Writing for Paris Transatlantic, Dan Warburton commented: "There's an integrity to Moondoc's music that is all too often lacking in the work of younger saxophonists, who seem to be more concerned with running all over the instrument, or even blowing it to pieces... Firstly, when you've got a sound on your horn as full and round as Moondoc's, you don't need to run through a whole book of scales and arpeggios to impress. Even in the most active pieces on offer here... you get the distinct impression that Moondoc can always find the necessary breathing space... There must be quite a few young cats out there who'd love to have an album out on Eremite, but they'd do well to remember music as fine as this only comes from many years of playing, training, fortifying and feeding the spirit - and you know it'll still be sounding just as great many years from now."

== Track listing ==
Disc One:

1. "Spirit House" (Moondoc) - 11:43
2. "O'Neal's Porch" (Parker) - 17:10
3. "New World Pygmies" (Moondoc/Parker) - 27:01
4. "You Let Me Into Your Life" (Moondoc) - 17:15

Disc Two:

1. "New World Pygmies" (Moondoc/Parker) - 27:25
2. "Blues for Katie Part I" (Moondoc) - 6:14
3. "Blues for Katie Part II & III" (Moondoc) - 15:08
4. "Three Clay Pots" (Parker) - 17:50

== Personnel ==
- Jemeel Moondoc - alto sax, soprano sax
- William Parker - bass, bombard, gralla
- Hamid Drake - trap drums
