= Sean Smith (bassist) =

American modern jazz double bass player and composer

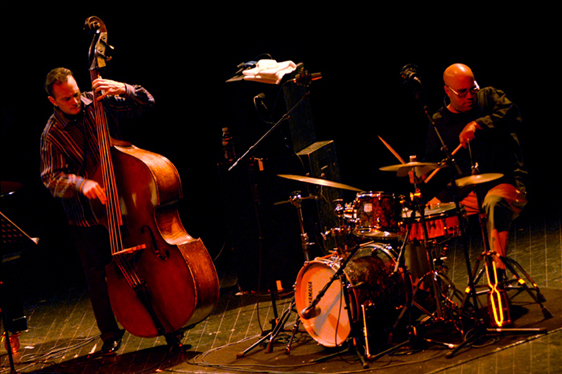
- Leon Parker and Sean Smith (left) in the trio of Jacky Terrasson 2007

Background information
- Birth name: Sean Smith
- Born: November 11, 1965 (age 59); Norwalk, Connecticut, U.S.
- Genres: Jazz
- Occupations: Musician; composer
- Instrument: Double bass
- Years active: 1984–present
- Labels: Progressive Records; Chiaroscuro Records; Ambient; Smithereen Records
- Website: www.seansmithjazz.com

Sean Smith (born 1965 in Norwalk, Connecticut) is an American jazz double bass player and composer.

== Early life and education ==
Sean Smith was born in Norwalk, Connecticut in 1965 to very supportive but non-musical parents. He grew up in Cos Cob, Connecticut. Smith began learning the alto saxophone in the fourth grade, then switched to the electric bass (in junior high school) and played rock and roll, before finally finding the double bass in high school and engaging with jazz music. Some of his early influences were Miles Davis and Weather Report, especially Wayne Shorter and Jaco Pastorius. He was also influenced by Duke Ellington, Billy Strayhorn, Antonio Carlos Jobim, as well as the great jazz composers, Brazilian music, and the great American songbook. In 1990, he completed his studies at the Manhattan School of Music and had already been working in the New York jazz scene since the early 1980s. 1990 was also the year Sean Smith started to compose music.

== Career ==
Smith made his first recording in 1984, with guitarist Greg Packham. In the following years, he played and recorded with Allen Lowe (For Poor B.B. and Others ...), Virginia Mayhew, Richard Peaslee, alto saxophonist Allen Mezquida, and with pianist Bill Charlap, with whom he recorded a duo album in 1993 featuring 6 Sean Smith compositions as well as standards "Donna Lee", "Darn That Dream", and "When Your Lover Has Gone". Worked with Gene Bertoncini starting in the 1980's as well as Flip Phillips, Lee Konitz, Peggy Lee, Rosemary Clooney, Helen Merrill, Mark Murphy, and Bill Mays in the 1990's.

In 1999, his debut album Sean Smith Quartet Live was recorded on the SS Norway; his quartet consisted of Allen Mezquida (alto saxophone), Bill Charlap, and Ron Vincent (drums). Two other albums under his own name followed.

According to Judith Schlesinger of AllMusic, writing in early 2000s, the "pitch-perfect, fluid, and elegant bassist" is one of the most employed musicians in the international jazz scene.

A prolific composer, Smith also composes music for films.

== Awards and honors ==
Smith received the 2007 Back Stage magazine's Bistro Award in the instrumentalist category. His ensemble was awarded the CMA/ASCAP Award for Adventurous Programming in 2015. The song "Song for the Geese" composed by Smith is the title track of an album by Mark Murphy, which was nominated for a Grammy Award. The 2003 album Into the Blue by Emmanuel Pahud and Jacky Terrasson, in which he participated as a bassist, was also nominated for a Grammy.

== Selected discography ==
- Bill Charlap & Sean Smith (Progressive Records, 1993)
- Bill Mays: Mays in Manhattan (Concord Jazz, 1996)
- Gene Bertoncini with Bill Charlap and Sean Smith (Chiaroscuro Records, 1996)
- Peter Brainin / Steve Johns Feat. Ben Monder & Sean Smith: Ceremony (Cats Paw Records, 1998)
- CCQt: Ontology (New Artists, 1998), with Richard Tabnik, Connie Crothers, Sean Smith, Roger Mancuso
- The Sean Smith Quartet Live! (Chiaroscuro Records, 1998)
- Poise (Ambient, 2001), with Allen Mezquida (as), Bill Charlap, Keith Ganz (g), Russell Meissner (dr)
- Trust (Smithereen, 2010), with John Ellis, John Hart
- The Humanity Quartet: Humanity (Cellar Live, 2014), with Joel Frahm, Peter Bernstein, Sean Smith, Leon Parker
