= The Evening of the Blue Men =

Live album by Jemeel Moondoc
- Released: 1979
- Recorded: March 30, 1979
- Venue: St. Mark's Church, New York City
- Genre: Jazz
- Length: 40:41
- Label: Muntu

Jemeel Moondoc chronology
First Feeding (1977)	The Evening of the Blue Men (1979)	New York Live! (1981)

The Evening of the Blue Men is an album by American jazz saxophonist Jemeel Moondoc with Muntu, which was recorded live in 1979 at NYC's St. Mark's Church and released on his own Muntu label. The album was reissued in 2009 as part of the three-CD box Muntu Recordings on the Lithuanian NoBusiness label. This second Muntu unit, a pianoless quartet consisting of Moondoc, trumpeter Roy Campbell, bassist William Parker and drummer Rashid Bakr, made its first performance in December 1978 at Ali's Alley.

== Reception ==
In a review of the Muntu box for AllAboutJazz, John Sharpe says about the album "Without piano, Moondoc's tone sounds lighter and airier, his Ornette Coleman influence more to the fore. Campbell's fluent, slurred legato blends pleasingly with the reedman's plangent holler."

In a review for Paris Transatlantic, Clifford Allen wrote: "Blue Men combines a ringing, sectional quality suggesting Cecil Taylor with a singsong Ornette vibe. Moondoc is... fluid in his exhortations, and though his earlier more ragged style is intriguing, such easy confidence is a gas to hear. As he builds into tortured peals and earthy honks, Campbell swoops in with crackling explosions, joining the incision of Clifford Brown and Donald Ayler to the joviality of Don Cherry. Coupled to the triple-time bombs of Bakr, the accompanying shouts of other band members are understandable... It's a shame that Evening of the Blue Men received such limited circulation at the time, for it might otherwise have been judged a modern jazz classic."

== Track listing ==
All compositions by Jemeel Moondoc

1. "The Evening of the Blue Men, Part 3 (Double Expo)" - 21:02
2. "Theme for Diane" - 19:39

== Personnel ==
- Jemeel Moondoc - alto sax
- Roy Campbell - trumpet
- William Parker - bass
- Rashid Bakr - drums
