= Medicine Buddha (album) =

Live album by Billy Bang and William Parker
- Released: July 1, 2014
- Recorded: May 8, 2009
- Venue: Rubin Museum of Art, New York City
- Genre: Free jazz
- Label: NoBusiness; NBCD 71
- Producer: Danas Mikailionis, William Parker, Valerij Anosov

Billy Bang chronology
Da Bang! (2013)	Medicine Buddha (2014)	Lucky Man: Music from the Film (2021)

Medicine Buddha is a live album by violinist Billy Bang and double bassist William Parker. It was recorded on May 8, 2009, at the Rubin Museum of Art in New York City, and was released on July 1, 2014 by NoBusiness Records.

== Reception ==
Professional ratings
Review scores
Source	Rating
The Free Jazz Collective	4/5 stars
Jazzwise	4/5 stars
Tom Hull – on the Web	A−

In a review for The Free Jazz Collective, Martin Schray called the album "Parker's last good-bye for a lifelong friend" (Bang died in 2011), and wrote: "What's so great about this music is the fact that you can literally listen to a friendship, to a deep emotional connection... In its best moments the album is filled with absolute magic leaping off the strings, dynamic plucks, a vortex of overtones, and an enthusiastic commitment to sheer beauty.

Mike Shanley of JazzTimes stated: "the duo's longstanding friendship involved not only shared musical sensibilities but humor and a sense of joie de vivre as well. Those feelings come across clearly on this set."

Writing for Jazzwise, Spencer Grady described the album as a "sublime string summit, the resumption of an intuitive, spiritual connection," and depicted the opening track as "summoning snaking, blues-driven string drones" that find "antecedents in the avant-garde hillbilly epics of Henry Flynt."

Dusted Magazine's Derek Taylor praised the track titled "Eternal Planet," featuring "Parker covering the low end with a ferocious back and forth between fingers and snapping bow and Bang scribbling and scrawling several registers above, his lines tapering and twirling at dizzying speeds to leave textured trails."

John Sharpe of The New York City Jazz Record called the album "a fitting tribute to Bang," and noted: "The most effective moments come when both men are wielding their bows. Parker is a past master at imaginative yet propulsive underpinning and he partakes in abstract interplay with Bang throughout this set."

Critic Tom Hull included the recording in his "Best Jazz Albums of 2014" list, describing it as "superb," and remarking: "I wouldn't hold much hope for violin-bass duos, but we're talking two all-time jazz greats here, and both have a tendency toward hearts-on-sleeve."

In an article for Point of Departure, Jason Bivins stated that the album is "filled with absolute magic leaping off the strings, propulsive plucks, whorls of overtones, and always a commitment to deep melody." He commented: "What's so great about this music is Bang's and Parker's ability to create... veritable tapestries but to continually imbue them with fresh detail, whether a slice of deep funk or a suggestive, woody detail. Fine stuff."

== Track listing ==
1. "Medicine Buddha" (Billy Bang, William Parker) – 22:30
2. "Sky Song" (Billy Bang, William Parker) – 6:15
3. "Bronx Aborigines" (Billy Bang, William Parker) – 3:42
4. "Eternal Planet (Dedicated to Leroy Jenkins)" (William Parker) – 14:22
5. "Buddha's Joy" (William Parker) – 5:43

== Personnel ==
- Billy Bang – violin, thumb piano
- William Parker – double bass, shakuhachi, dousn gouni
