= Nostalgia in Times Square =

Studio album by Jemeel Moondoc
- Released: 1986
- Recorded: November 24, 1985
- Studio: Zen's Studio, Brooklyn
- Genre: Jazz
- Length: 51:37
- Label: Soul Note
- Producer: Giovanni Bonandrini

Jemeel Moondoc chronology
Konstanze's Delight (1983)	Nostalgia in Times Square (1986)	Tri-P-Let (1996)

Nostalgia in Times Square is an album by American jazz saxophonist Jemeel Moondoc, which was recorded in 1985 and released the following year on the Italian Soul Note label. He leads a quintet that features alto saxophonist Ornette Coleman guitarist Bern Nix, former Roland Kirk pianist Rahn Burton, bassist William Parker and drummer Denis Charles. This is Moondoc's first date with piano since his 1977 debut album, Muntu's First Feeding.

== Music ==
The title track is a medium-tempo blues written by Charles Mingus for the 1959 John Cassavetes film Shadows, recorded by the bassist on the album Jazz Portraits: Mingus in Wonderland and reprised as "Strollin'," with a vocal by Honi Gordon, on Mingus Dynasty. "Flora," a ballad named for Moondoc's maternal grandmother, marks his recorded debut on soprano saxophone, a horn he first played in the early 1970s as a member of Cecil Taylor's student orchestra at Antioch College. "In Walked Monk" is a homage to pianist Thelonious Monk, named after Monk's tribute to Bud Powell "In Walked Bud". "Dance of the Clowns" started off as interlude music for the score that Moondoc wrote for the play The Siberian Express, and would be renamed as "Dance of the Negro Lawn Jockeys" in later years.

== Reception ==
Professional ratings
Review scores
Source	Rating
AllMusic	4.5/5 stars
The Penguin Guide to Jazz	3.5/4 stars

The album was received as a move inside the tradition. The Penguin Guide to Jazz says that "is interesting for the addition of a guitar player and the abandonment of vibes for piano" but notes that "it's certainly a conservative step and there's nothing on the set that really grabs attention."

Writing for All About Jazz, Tim Niland called the recording a "forward thinking, yet swinging album," and commented: "Despite just being a quintet, the group was able to achieve a much bigger sound than their size indicated...This was a very enjoyable album, reminiscent of the music that was made by Charles Mingus last great working band with Don Pullen and George Adams. It's well worth revisiting the Black Saint and Soul Note catalogs for overlooked gems like this."

== Track listing ==
All compositions by Jemeel Moondoc except as indicated

1. "Nostalgia in Times Square" (Charles Mingus) – 13:12
2. "Flora" – 12:18
3. "In Walked Monk" – 15:16
4. "Dance of the Clowns" – 10:51

== Personnel ==
- Jemeel Moondoc – alto sax, soprano sax
- Bern Nix – guitar
- Rahn Burton – piano
- William Parker – bass
- Denis Charles – drums
