= Candid Records =

American jazz record label (founded 1960)

- Parent company: Cadence Records
- Founded: 1960
- Founder: Archie Bleyer
- Genre: Jazz, Blues
- Country of origin: United States
- Location: New York

Candid Records was a jazz record label first established in New York City.

== Early Candid Records ==
The CANDID jazz label was founded in New York City in 1960 as a subsidiary of Cadence Records, owned by Archie Bleyer. The jazz writer and civil rights activist Nat Hentoff was the label's (A&R) director and, consequently, he attempted to create a catalog that represented the prevalent jazz music of the day. Hentoff also worked with the graphic designer and photographer Frank Gauna to create Candid's distinctive album covers.

Candid's catalog included Don Ellis, Abbey Lincoln, Booker Little, Charles Mingus, and Cecil Taylor. Later, the label was acquired by pop singer Andy Williams, who either reissued the catalog on his own Barnaby label or licensed them to foreign record companies into the 1970s and late 1980s.

== The Cadence-era Discography ==
=== The 34 Cadence-era LPs ===
Mono Catalog	Stereo Catalog	Leader	Album	Year
CJM-8001	CJS-9001	Otis Spann	Otis Spann Is the Blues	1961
CJM-8002	CJS-9002	Max Roach	We Insist!	1961
CJM-8003	CJS-9003	Richard Williams	New Horn in Town	1961
CJM-8004	CJS-9004	Don Ellis	How Time Passes	1961
CJM-8005	CJS-9005	Charlie Mingus	Charles Mingus Presents Charles Mingus	1961
CJM-8006	CJS-9006	Cecil Taylor	The World of Cecil Taylor	1961
CJM-8007	CJS-9007	Steve Lacy	The Straight Horn of Steve Lacy	1961
CJM-8008	CJS-9008	Nancy Harrow	Wild Women Don't Have the Blues	1961
CJM-8009	CJS-9009	Clark Terry	Color Changes	1961
CJM-8010	CJS-9010	Lightnin' Hopkins	Lightnin' in New York	1961
CJM-8011	CJS-9011	Benny Bailey	Big Brass	1961
CJM-8012	CJS-9012	Toshiko Mariano	The Toshiko–Mariano Quartet	1961
CJM-8013	CJS-9013	Cecil Taylor	Jumpin' Punkins	1961
CJM-8014	CJS-9014	Booker Ervin	That's It!	1961
CJM-8015	CJS-9015	Abbey Lincoln	Straight Ahead	1961
CJM-8016	CJS-9016	Phil Woods	Rights of Swing	1961
CJM-8017	CJS-9017	Cecil Taylor & Buell Neidlinger	New York City R&B	1961
CJM-8018	CJS-9018	Jaki Byard	Blues for Smoke	1961
CJM-8019	CJS-9019	Various Artists (Charlie Mingus, Max Roach, Booker Little, Cal Massey, Kenny Dorham and others)	The Jazz Life!	1961
CJM-8020	CJS-9020	Pee Wee Russell and Coleman Hawkins	Jazz Reunion	1961
CJM-8021	CJS-9021	Charlie Mingus	Mingus	1961
CJM-8022	CJS-9022	Jazz Artists Guild	Newport Rebels	1961
CJM-8023	CJS-9023	Memphis Slim	Tribute to Broonzy, Carr, Davenport	1961
CJM-8024	CJS-9024	Memphis Slim	Memphis Slim, U.S.A.	1962
CJM-8025	CJS-9025	Mack McCormick	Treasury Of Field Recordings Vol. 1	1962
CJM-8026	CJS-9026	Charlie Mingus	Reincarnation of a Lovebird	1963
CJM-8027	CJS-9027	Booker Little	Out Front	1963
CJM-8028	CJS-9028	Ray Crawford	Smooth Groove	1963
CJM-8029	CJS-9029	Cal Massey	Blues to Coltrane	1963
CJM-8030	CJS-9030	Chamber Jazz Sextet	Plays Pal Joey	1963
CJM-8031	CJS-9031	Marty Paich	The Picasso of Big Band Jazz	1963
CJM-8032	CJS-9032	Don Ellis	Out of Nowhere	1963
CJM-8033	CJS-9033	Eric Dolphy	Candid Dolphy	1963
CJM-8034	CJS-9034	Cecil Taylor	Cell Walk for Celeste	1963

In 1964, due to its financial difficulties, Archie Bleyer opted to shut down Cadence Records, parent company of Candid Records and sold the complete Cadence catalog (inclusive of the Candid Records recordings) to the singer, Andy Williams, owner of Barnaby Records.

== Post-Cadence Italian/German/British Candid Records ==
Catalog	Leader	Album
(Eu) CS-9035	Lucky Thompson	Lord, Lord, Am I Ever Gonna Know?
(Eu) CS-9036	Ricky Ford	Manhattan Blues
(Eu) CS-9037	Art Hodes	Pagin' Mr. Jelly
(Eu) CS-9038		
(Eu) CS-9039		
(Eu) CS-9040	Erica Lindsay	Dreamer
(Eu) CS-9041	David Newman	Blue Head
(Eu) CS-9042	Charlie Mingus	Mysterious Blues
(Eu) CS-9043		
(Eu) CS-9044	Kenny Barron & John Hicks	Rhythm-a-Ning
(Eu) CS-9045	Louis Hayes	The Crawl
(Eu) CS-9046	Cecil Taylor	Air

== Candid Records UK ==
In 1989, the Candid recordings were bought by Black Lion Records, which reissued the vintage material on CDs and produced new recordings succeedingly. The new Candid Records (UK) catalogue expanded to include Greg Abate, Kenny Barron, Luis Bonilla, Art Hodes, Lee Konitz, Dave Liebman, Shorty Rogers and Bud Shank, Mongo Santamaría, Shirley Scott and a host of new jazz talent.
