= Love for Sale (Cecil Taylor album) =

Studio album by Cecil Taylor
- Released: 1959
- Recorded: April 15, 1959
- Genre: Jazz
- Length: 50:11
- Label: United Artists
- Producer: Tom Wilson

Cecil Taylor chronology
Stereo Drive (1959)	Love for Sale (1959)	The World of Cecil Taylor (1960)

Love for Sale is an album by the pianist Cecil Taylor, recorded for the United Artists label in April 1959. The album features performances by Taylor with Buell Neidlinger, and Denis Charles with Bill Barron and Ted Curson added on three tracks.

== Reception ==
Professional ratings
Review scores
Source	Rating
AllMusic	4.5/5 stars
The Penguin Guide to Jazz Recordings	3.5/4 stars

The AllMusic review by Thom Jurek states: "This may be the straightest record Cecil Taylor ever recorded, but it is far from uninspiring... Taylor's approach to three Cole Porter tunes with a trio and three of his own with a quintet is a lively combination, and one which, in lieu of his later work, reveals the construction of his system of improvisation better than his later records do when he is playing from the middle of it... Love for Sale is a delightful anomaly in Cecil Taylor's long career".

The authors of The Penguin Guide to Jazz wrote: "The three Cole Porter songs that open the record are starting-points for interpretations which are as radical as any standard had been subjected to at this point in jazz. Taylor keeps a toehold on melody or harmony, but no more than that and, as his phrase-lengths become ever more unpredictable, his shaping of the material transforms not just the songs but the way jazz after bop could improvise on received forms... Another fascinating stop in the patient transition from jazz orthodoxy to Taylor's mature music."

== Track listing ==
All compositions by Cecil Tayor except as indicated

1. "Get Out of Town" (Cole Porter) - 9:12
2. "I Love Paris" (Porter) - 5:11
3. "Love for Sale" (Porter) - 8:15
4. "Little Lees" (a.k.a. "Louise") - 9:04
5. "Matie's Trophies" (a.k.a. "Motystrophe" or "Blues") - 10:13
6. "Carol/Three Points" - 8:16 Bonus track on CD

- Recorded at Nola's Penthouse Studios, NYC, April 15, 1959

== Personnel ==
- Cecil Taylor – piano
- Buell Neidlinger – bass
- Denis Charles – drums
- Bill Barron – tenor saxophone (tracks 4–6)
- Ted Curson – trumpet (tracks 4–6)
