= Jumpin' Punkins =

Studio album by Cecil Taylor
- Released: 1977, 1987
- Recorded: January 9–10, 1961
- Genre: Jazz
- Length: 33:23
- Label: Candid

Cecil Taylor chronology
Cell Walk for Celeste (1961)	Jumpin' Punkins (1977)	New York City R&B (1961)

Jumpin' Punkins is an album by Cecil Taylor recorded for the Candid label in January 1961 but not issued in the States until 1987. The first release was in Japan by Victor in 1977 as Cecil Taylor All Stars Featuring Buell Neidlinger, although a release was initially scheduled (with a different cover) in 1971, with a promotional edition produced before the intended retail release was cancelled. The album features two small group performances by Taylor with Buell Neidlinger, Denis Charles and Archie Shepp, and two performances by a larger group including Billy Higgins, Clark Terry, Roswell Rudd, Steve Lacy and Charles Davis. Additional recordings from these sessions were released on New York City R&B in 1971 and Cell Walk for Celeste in 1988.

== Reception ==
Professional ratings
Review scores
Source	Rating
Allmusic	4/5 stars
The Penguin Guide to Jazz Recordings	4/4 stars

In a review for AllMusic, Scott Yanow wrote: "The two most intriguing performances are versions of Mercer Ellington's 'Jumpin' Punkins' and 'Things Ain't What They Used to Be' which feature the avant-garde pianist with trumpeter Clark Terry, trombonist Roswell Rudd, soprano saxophonist Steve Lacy, baritonist Charles Davis, tenor Archie Shepp, bassist Buell Neidlinger, and drummer Billy Higgins. Taylor's jarring comping behind the other soloists is quite interesting and somehow works. 'O.P.' and 'I Forgot' feature Taylor with Neidlinger, drummer Dennis Charles, and (on the latter song) the young Archie Shepp. A good sampler of Cecil Taylor's marathon Candid sessions."

== Track listing ==
All compositions by Cecil Tayor except as indicated

1. "Jumpin' Punkins" [Take 6] (Mercer Ellington) - 8:15
2. "O.P." [Take 1] (Buell Neidlinger) - 7:35
3. "I Forgot" [Take 1] (Cecil Taylor) - 8:34
4. "Things Ain't What They Used to Be" [Take 3] (Mercer Ellington) - 8:55

- Recorded Nola's Penthouse Sound Studios, NYC, January 9 (tracks 2 & 3) & 10 (tracks 1 & 4), 1961

== Personnel ==
- Cecil Taylor - piano
- Buell Neidlinger - bass
- Denis Charles - drums (tracks 2 & 3)
- Archie Shepp - tenor saxophone (tracks 1, 3 & 4)
- Billy Higgins - drums (tracks 1 & 4)
- Clark Terry - trumpet (tracks 1 & 4)
- Roswell Rudd - trombone (tracks 1 & 4)
- Steve Lacy - soprano saxophone (tracks 1 & 4)
- Charles Davis - baritone saxophone (tracks 1 & 4)
