= Jemeel Moondoc =

American jazz saxophonist (1946–2021)

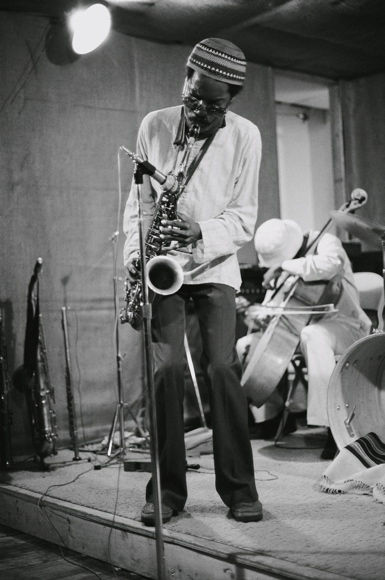
- Moondoc performing at Studio Rivbea July, 1976

Background information
- Born: August 5, 1946; Chicago, Illinois, United States
- Died: August 29, 2021 (aged 75)
- Genres: Jazz
- Occupation: Musician
- Instruments: Alto saxophone, clarinet, piano
- Website: https://www.jemeelmoondoc.com/

Jemeel Moondoc (August 5, 1946 – August 29, 2021) was a jazz saxophonist who played alto saxophone. He was a proponent of a highly improvisational style.

He was born in Chicago, Illinois, United States, and studied clarinet and piano before settling on saxophone at sixteen. He became interested in jazz largely due to Cecil Taylor and at the University of Wisconsin–Madison, he was a student of Taylor's. After that he moved to New York City, where he founded "Ensemble Muntu" with William Parker, Roy Campbell, Jr., and Rashid Bakr. The group also had its own Muntu record label, but eventually faced financial difficulties. In 1984, he formed the Jus Grew Orchestra, which secured a residency at the Neither/Nor club on the Lower East Side. He worked with Parker again in 1998's album, New World Pygmies.

He died in August 2021, at the age of 75 from the effects of sickle cell anemia.

== Discography ==
=== As leader ===
- First Feeding (Muntu, 1977)
- The Evening of the Blue Men (Muntu, 1979)
- New York Live! (Cadence Jazz, 1981)
- The Intrepid Live in Poland (Poljazz, 1981)
- We Don't (Eremite, 1981; issued 2003) - with Denis Charles
- Judy's Bounce (Soul Note, 1982)
- The Athens Concert (Praxis, 1982)
- Konstanze's Delight (Soul Note, 1983)
- Nostalgia in Times Square (Soul Note, 1986)
- Tri-P-Let (Eremite, 1996)
- Fire in the Valley (Eremite, 1997)
- New World Pygmies (Eremite, 1998)
- Revolt of the Negro Lawn Jockeys (Eremite, 2001)
- New World Pygmies vol. 2 (Eremite, 2002)
- Live at Glenn Miller Café Vol 1 (Ayler, 2002)
- Live in Paris (Cadence, 2003)
- Muntu Recordings (NoBusiness, 2009) reissue of First Feeding and The Evening of the Blue Men plus previously unreleased live material
- Two (Relative Pitch, 2012) - with Connie Crothers
- Yellow Back Radio Breakdown (Six Gallery Press, 2013) - with Michael Hafftka
- The Zookeeper's House (Relative Pitch, 2014)
- Cosmic Nickelodeon (Relative Pitch, 2016) - with Hilliard Greene
- The Astral Revelations (RogueArt, 2018)

with the Jus Grew Orchestra

- Spirit House (Eremite, 2001)
- Live at the Vision Festival (Ayler, 2003)

=== As sideman ===
with Active Ingredients (Chad Taylor, Moondoc, Tom Abbs, Steve Swell)

- Titration (Delmark, 2002 [2003])

with Denis Charles

- Captain of the Deep (Eremite, 1998)

with Steve Swell

- This Now! (Cadence Jazz, 2003)
- Swimming in a Galaxy of Goodwill and Sorrow (RogueArt, 2007)
