= Fire in the Valley =

Live album by Jemeel Moondoc
- Released: 1997
- Recorded: July 27, 1996
- Venue: UMASS, Amherst, Massachusetts
- Genre: Jazz
- Length: 41:19
- Label: Eremite
- Producer: Michael Ehlers

Jemeel Moondoc chronology
Tri-P-Let (1996)	Fire in the Valley (1997)	New World Pygmies (1999)

Fire in the Valley is an album by American jazz saxophonist Jemeel Moondoc, which was recorded live at the Fire in the Valley Festival in 1996 and released on the Eremite label. He leads a trio with bassist John Voigt and drummer Laurence Cook, the same lineup as the previous studio album Tri-P-Let.

== Reception ==
Professional ratings
Review scores
Source	Rating
AllMusic	4.5/5 stars
The Penguin Guide to Jazz	3/4 stars

In his review for AllMusic, Thom Jurek notes about Moondoc "Unlike many free jazzers who try to blow the guts out of the horn each and every time they improvise, he digs deep into the jazz tradition for his material... His tone is more reminiscent of Jackie McLean's while his playing style comes from the same place that Charles Tyler's does."

The Penguin Guide to Jazz says that the album "is a tough, often abrasive and, to be honest, slightly unrelieved set which doesn't benefit from a recording which makes no effort to buff up the blunter edges."

The All About Jazz review by Derek Taylor states "Cook and Voigt bustle back and forth between volcanic eruptions and quieter dispersions, and Moondoc’s sound is similarly varied between raw, raucous honks and elongated, emotionally charged lines."

== Track listing ==
All compositions by Jemeel Moondoc

1. "Fire in the Valley" - 39:51
2. "Encore" - 1:28

== Personnel ==
- Jemeel Moondoc - alto sax
- Laurence Cook - percussion
- John Voigt - bass
