= Trần Mạnh Tuấn =

Trần Mạnh Tuấn (born May 7, 1970 in Hanoi) is one of the two most prominent jazz saxophonists in Vietnam (the other being Quyền Văn Minh, also from Hanoi). In 2002, he moved from Hanoi to Ho Chi Minh City and has taught at the Ho Chi Minh City Conservatory. He is also a composer, arranger and producer.

He is from a musical family; his father, mother, and sister are all performers of cải lương, a traditional musical theater form of southern Vietnam. He began playing the saxophone in 1979 and is a graduate of the Berklee College of Music.

He has released five solo CDs and has performed and recorded with several Vietnamese pop singers. He is also known for his interpretations of the songs of Trịnh Công Sơn.

Trần Mạnh Tuấn has performed with a number of well known musicians including Herbie Hancock, Wayne Shorter, Derek Nash, Lillian Boutte, Charlie Bisharat, Dave Grusin, Don Grusin, Hans Dulfer, Fulvio Albano, Rob Mullins, Mike Del Frerro, John Ferguson, Stephan Eicher, Co Co York, Jennifer Ryan, Mezcal Jazz Unit, Dana Leong, and Denis Mininfield.

In 2005 he opened the Sax n' Art jazz club in Ho Chi Minh City.

== Collaboration with Mezcal Jazz Unit ==
In 2005-2007, Tuấn was involved in Tim Gió, a musical and cultural exchange project between Vietnam and France. The project involved the French jazz band Mezcal Jazz Unit, Trần Mạnh Tuấn as well as other Vietnamese folk musicians like Cao Ho Nga (dân t'rưng, đàn tranh), Nguyen Thu Thy (đàn nhị), Nguyen Anh Tran (đàn bầu, đàn nguyệt, đàn đáy). A CD entitled Tim Gió was released in 2006.

== Discography ==
- Độc tấu Saxophone Trần Mạnh Tuấn (1997)
- Biển Khát (2001)
- Hạ Trắng (2002)
- Coming Home (2003)
- The Shadow Of Time (2006)
- Jungle Lullaby (2006)
- Drifting Blossoms and Floating Clouds (2008)
- Ru ta ngậm ngùi (2009)
- Wings of the Flying Crane (2012)
- Angel Eyes (2012)
- Blue Eyes (2013)
- Jazz It Up "Sến" (Thành phố buồn) (2013)
- Simply Soul (2016)
- Legendary Shepherd on the Moon (2016)
- Rhythm of the Fall (2016)

=== Collaborative albums ===
- Lời Ru Mắt Em (Collaboration with Vũ Quang Trung)
- Tim Gió (2006) (Collaboration with the French group Mezcal Jazz Unit)

=== Guest appearances ===
- With Billy Bang: Lucky Man: Music from the Film (BBE, 2021)
