= The Flame (Steve Lacy album) =

Studio album by Steve Lacy
- Released: 1982
- Recorded: January 18–19, 1982
- Genre: Jazz
- Length: 43:18
- Label: Soul Note
- Producer: Giovanni Bonandrini

Steve Lacy chronology
Live at Dreher, Paris 1981 (1981)	The Flame (1982)	Prospectus (1983)

The Flame is an album by Steve Lacy, released on the Italian Soul Note label. It features four of Lacy's compositions and one by Bobby Few performed by Lacy, Bobby Few and Dennis Charles.

== Reception ==
The AllMusic review by Scott Yanow stated: "This adventurous music, with only a quartet [sic], falls along the lines of other brilliant efforts by the leader. On four Lacy originals and one by Few, the musicians tackle circular thematic group improvisations that are never aimless. By exploiting impressive technique and (just as importantly) open ears, the players constantly respond to each other and come up with fresh ideas. An intriguing set, worth the search."

Professional ratings
Review scores
Source	Rating
AllMusic	4.5/5 stars
The Penguin Guide to Jazz Recordings	3.5/4 stars
The Rolling Stone Jazz Record Guide	3/5 stars

== Track listing ==
1. "The Match" - 9:49
2. "Wet Spot" (Bobby Few) - 4:27
3. "Gusts" - 7:35
4. "Licks" - 8:16
5. "The Flame" - 13:11

All compositions by Steve Lacy except as indicated
- Recorded at Barigozzi Studio, Milan, Italy, on January 18–19, 1982

== Personnel ==
- Steve Lacy - soprano saxophone
- Bobby Few - piano
- Dennis Charles - drums
