= Cosmic Nickelodeon =

Studio album by Jemeel Moondoc and Hilliard Greene
- Released: 2016
- Recorded: December 12, 2015
- Studio: Park West Studios, Brooklyn, New York
- Genre: Free jazz
- Label: Relative Pitch; RPR1047

Jemeel Moondoc chronology
| The Zookeeper's House (2014) | Cosmic Nickelodeon (2016) | The Astral Revelations (2018) |

Cosmic Nickelodeon is an album by saxophonist Jemeel Moondoc and bassist Hilliard Greene. It was recorded on December 12, 2015, at Park West Studios in Brooklyn, New York, and was released in 2016 by Relative Pitch Records.

== Reception ==
Professional ratings
Review scores
| Source | Rating |
|---|---|
| All About Jazz | 4/5 stars |
| Tom Hull – on the Web | B+ |

In a review for All About Jazz, Mark Corroto called the album "a set of unhurried and deliberate exchanges" and "a comfort food variety of recording," and wrote: "a gospel tinge permeates the session. Moondoc's alto mixes Ornette Coleman's articulation with that of late-period Art Pepper."

Derek Taylor of Dusted Magazine stated: "Both alto saxophone and double bass are beautifully recorded, the fine grain particulars of each audible alongside the frequent sighs and asides of satisfaction from the musicians."

Writing for Jazz Right Now, drummer Marc Edwards commented: "I enjoyed the music and the performances from Jemeel and Hilliard. I hope they decide to do another recording in the future. If you are into melodic musical explorations, than this CD is for you."

The Morning Star's Chris Searle remarked: "From his first tunnelling notes of opener 'Blues for Katie', Greene digs deep. His plangent, declamatory notes carry through into 'Spiritual Medley', where both musicians' roots are proudly and pulsatingly asserted, while Moondoc's wailing phrases explore 'The Founding of a Lost World' on a record of sheer discovery by two ardent founders of sound."

The editors of The New York City Jazz Record included the album in their May 2016 list of "Recommended New Releases."

== Track listing ==
1. "Blues for Katie" – 5:53
2. "Spiritual Melody (Swing Low, Deep River, Wade in the Water)" – 5:31
3. "The Founding of the Lost World" – 5:03
4. "Hi-lo" – 5:50
5. "Here Now Gone Now" – 6:15
6. "Pizz" – 2:49
7. "Cosmic Nickelodeon" – 11:21

== Personnel ==
- Jemeel Moondoc – alto saxophone
- Hilliard Greene – bass
