= Perception (disambiguation) =

Perception is the process of attaining awareness or understanding of sensory information. It can also be explained as how a person feels towards something.

Perception or Perceptions may also refer to:

== Music ==
- Perception (Art Farmer album), a 1961 jazz album
- Perception (Blessid Union of Souls album), a 2005 alternative rock album
- Perception (Connie Crothers album), a 1974 jazz album
- Perception (The Doors album), a 2006 box set
- Perceptions (Dizzy Gillespie album), a 1962 jazz album
- Perceptions (EP), an experimental album by VersaEmerge
- Perceptions (This Beautiful Republic album), a 2008 Christian rock album
- Perception (NF album), a 2017 rap album
- Perceptual (album), a Brian Blade album

== Television ==
- Perception (American TV series), an American crime drama starring Eric McCormack

== Other ==
- Machine perception, the capability of a computer system to interpret data in a manner that is similar to humans
- Perception (journal), a UK scientific journal investigating perception
- Perception (company), a media entertainment company
- Perception (video game), a 2017 adventure video game
