= Tri-P-Let =

Studio album by Jemeel Moondoc
- Released: 1996
- Recorded: June 16, 1996
- Studio: PBS, Westwood, Massachusetts
- Genre: Jazz
- Length: 54:33
- Label: Eremite
- Producer: Michael Ehlers

Jemeel Moondoc chronology
Nostalgia in Times Square (1986)	Tri-P-Let (1996)	Fire in the Valley (1997)

Tri-P-Let is an album by American jazz saxophonist Jemeel Moondoc, which was recorded in 1996 and became the first release on the Eremite label. It was Moondoc's first recording since 1985. He leads a trio with two Boston based musicians: bassist John Voigt and drummer Laurence Cook. "Triplet" is an extension of the album Judy's Bounce. "Another One the Hard Way" is dedicated to Ornette Coleman, while "Campbell’s Soup" is named after trumpeter Roy Campbell. "Ruby Riches" has the same scale as John Coltrane used in his song "Dear Lord".

== Reception ==
Professional ratings
Review scores
Source	Rating
AllMusic	4.5/5 stars
The Penguin Guide to Jazz	3/4 stars

In his review for AllMusic, Thom Jurek notes that "Tri-P-Let is what listeners have come to expect from Moondoc: nothing less than his measure of delivering perfection as closely and with as much spirited swinging argument as possible."

The Penguin Guide to Jazz says "Tri-P-Let pretty much carries on from work he was doing on Judy's Bounce and other early records. Inspired in almost equal measure by Ornette and Albert Ayler, it trades in fierce harmony runs, bursting rhythms, and intense, free form essays."

The All About Jazz review by Derek Taylor states "From the opening title piece the three players drop into a commensurate, if somewhat diffuse groove. Moondoc moves out front early blowing clipped angular phrases and both Voigt and Cook possess a fluid touch that frees up the trio’s rhythmic center without sacrificing momentum."

== Track listing ==
All compositions by Jemeel Moondoc

1. "Triplet" - 5:48
2. "Another One the Hard Way" - 14:13
3. "Improvisation #61696" - 11:34
4. "Campbell's Soup" - 11:50
5. "Ruby's Riches" - 11:08

== Personnel ==
- Jemeel Moondoc - alto sax
- Laurence Cook - drums
- John Voigt - bass
