= Music from Everyday Life =

Studio album by Connie Crothers
- Recorded: March 1993 – June 1996
- Genre: Jazz
- Label: New Artists

Music from Everyday Life is a solo piano album by Connie Crothers. It was recorded between 1993 and 1996 and released by New Artists.

== Recording and music ==
The album of solo piano performances was recorded privately by Crothers during the period from March 1993 to June 1996. Of the thirteen pieces, eight are Crothers originals, four are standards ("Good Morning Heartache", "How High the Moon", "Lover Man", and "Star Eyes"), and one is based on Béla Bartók's Romanian folk dances. Most of the performances are improvisations. Crothers does not play the melodies of the standards.

== Release and reception ==
Professional ratings
Review scores
Source	Rating
AllMusic	3/5 stars
The Penguin Guide to Jazz	3/4 stars

Music from Everyday Life was released by New Artists. The Penguin Guide to Jazz wrote: "this is deliberately unglamorous jazz that turns completely away from the ego-driven expressiveness of most solo work". The JazzTimes reviewer commented that "Her approach is ponderous and predictable and not particularly jazzy."

== Track listing ==
1. "Be" (Connie Crothers) – 2:37
2. "Lover Man" (Jimmy Davis, Roger "Ram" Ramirez, Jimmy Sherman) – 8:07
3. "Sonance" (Crothers) – 4:32
4. "Ontology" (Crothers) – 9:29
5. "Dig You" (Crothers) – 3:48
6. "Star Eyes" (Gene DePaul, Don Raye) – 3:52
7. "Say It" (Crothers) – 3:18
8. "Etude for the Spirit" (Crothers) – 5:59
9. "Bela Bartok, Buciumeana/Improvisation" – 5:39
10. "Little Sweet One" (Crothers) – 4:05
11. "Good Morning Heartache" (Ervin Drake, Dan Fisher, Irene Higginbotham) – 6:41
12. "How High the Moon" (Nancy Hamilton, Morgan Lewis) – 5:34
13. "Precious Life" (Crothers) – 3:42

== Personnel ==
- Connie Crothers – piano
