= Six Monk's Compositions (1987) =

Studio album by Anthony Braxton
- Released: 1987
- Recorded: June 30 and July 1, 1987
- Genre: Jazz
- Length: 43:53
- Label: Black Saint
- Producer: Giovanni Bonandrini

Anthony Braxton chronology
Moment Precieux (1986)	Six Monk's Compositions (1987) (1987)	Duets 1987 (1987)

Six Monk's Compositions (1987) is an album by American saxophonist and composer Anthony Braxton recorded in 1987 for the Italian Black Saint label. The album features Braxton's interpretations of compositions by Thelonious Monk.

== Reception ==
The AllMusic review by Thom Jurek awarded the album 4½ stars stating "From the jump, the listener can tell this is no ordinary Monk tribute. The music is fast, skittering along at a dervish's pace... radically reinterpreted, played and executed with a degree of musicianship seldom found on any tribute".

Professional ratings
Review scores
Source	Rating
AllMusic	4.5/5 stars
The Penguin Guide to Jazz Recordings	4/4 stars

== Track listing ==
All compositions by Thelonious Monk

1. "Brilliant Corners" – 9:24
2. "Reflections" – 4:58
3. "Played Twice" – 6:51
4. "Four in One" – 9:41
5. "Ask Me Now" – 6:35
6. "Skippy" – 6:43

- Recorded at Barigozzi Studio in Milano, Italy on June 30 and July 1, 1987

== Personnel ==
- Anthony Braxton – alto saxophone
- Mal Waldron – piano
- Buell Neidlinger – bass
- Billy Osborne – drums
