= Richard Tabnik =

American jazz saxophonist (born 1952)

Richard Tabnik (born 1952) is an American jazz saxophonist who lives in New York City.

== History ==
Tabnik studied with jazz alto saxophonist Lee Konitz from 1970 to 1972. From 1975 through 1979, he lived in Buffalo, N.Y. and played lead alto sax in Frank Foster's Big Band at University at Buffalo, The State University of New York.

He has written for and performed in many capacities in Houston, Texas, Atlanta, Georgia, and Providence, Rhode Island. He had studied and performed with Connie Crothers from January 1980.

Tabnik performed with the quartet CCQt with Connie Crothers on piano, Roger Mancuso on drums, and Sean Smith on bass.

== Discography ==
- DUO DIMENSION [NA1003CD or LP] - Connie Crothers, p. Richard Tabnik, a.s.,
- SOLO JOURNEY, [NA1011] - Richard Tabnik, solo a.s.,
- IN THE MOMENT [NA1015] - Richard Tabnik Trio w/ R.T. a.s, Carol Tristano, d., Cameron Brown, b.,
- LIFE AT THE CORE [NA1016] - Richard Tabnik Quartet w/ R.T., a.s., Andy Fite, g., Roger Mancuso, d., Calvin Hill, b
