= Hilliard Greene =

American jazz musician

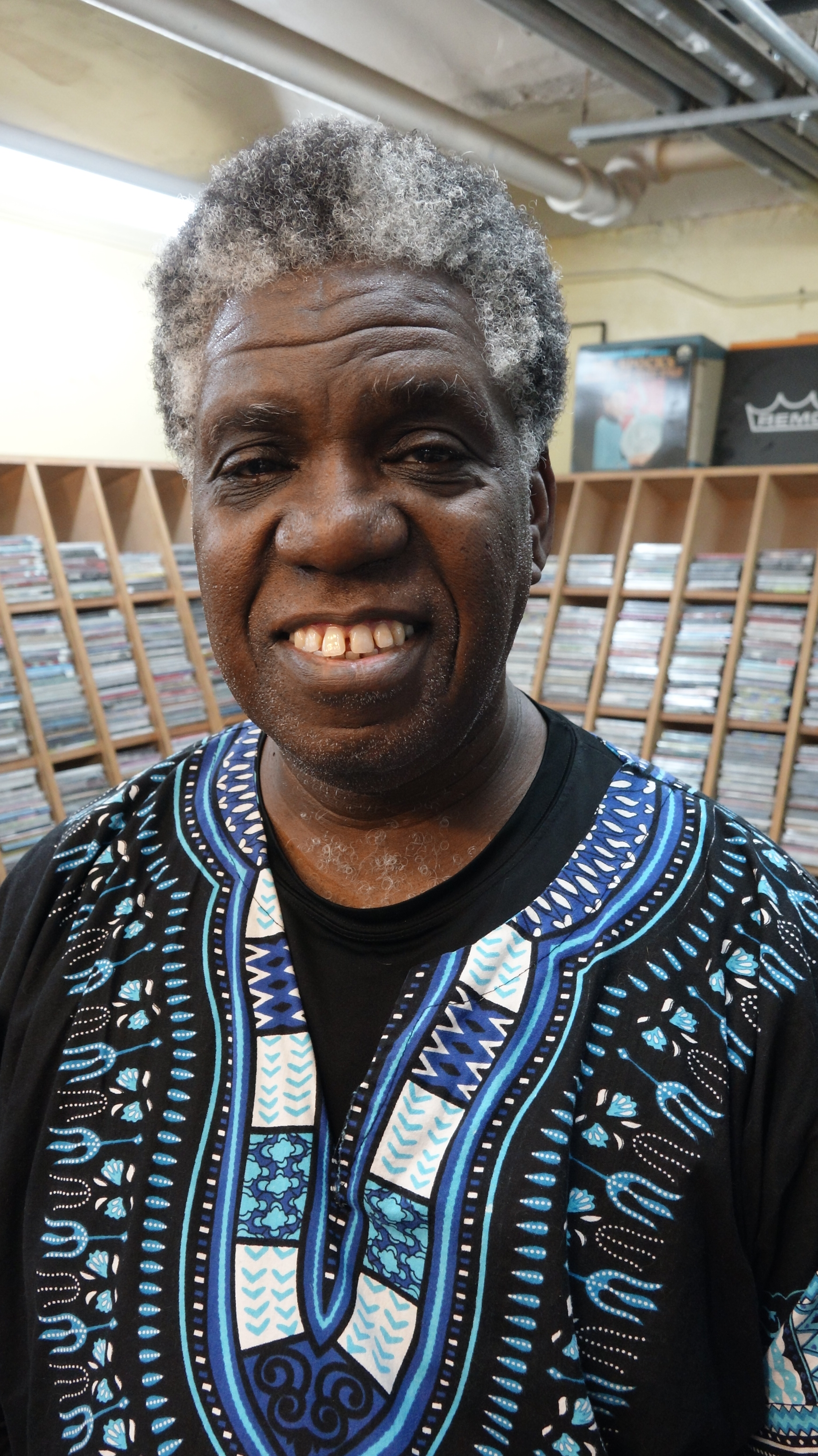

Background information
- Born: February 26, 1958 (age 67)
- Genres: jazz
- Years active: 2003–present

Hilliard Greene (born February 26, 1958) is an American bassist (playing both double bass, and bass guitar) specializing in modern creative, improvised, and jazz music, as well as a music educator.

== Life and work ==
Hilliard Greene studied at the Berklee College of Music in Boston and at the University of Northern Iowa. He worked as musical director for the singer Jimmy Scott for 20 years. For Cecil Taylor he served as concertmaster for the ensemble Phtongos and played in the trio with pianist Don Pullen. Under his own name, Hill worked with his ensemble, The Jazz Expressions, with whom he recorded three albums; He also played in a quartet with Steve Swell, Gebhard Ullmann, and Barry Altschul. In 2003, Hill released his solo album Alone. He has also appeared on recordings by Dave Douglas (Sanctuary, 1997), Klaus Kugel, Perry Robinson, Charles Gayle (Repent, 1997) and Patrick Brennan. Hill currently works as a music teacher at the Bass Collective in New York City, where he teaches workshops and master classes in double bass and bass guitar.

== Selected discography ==
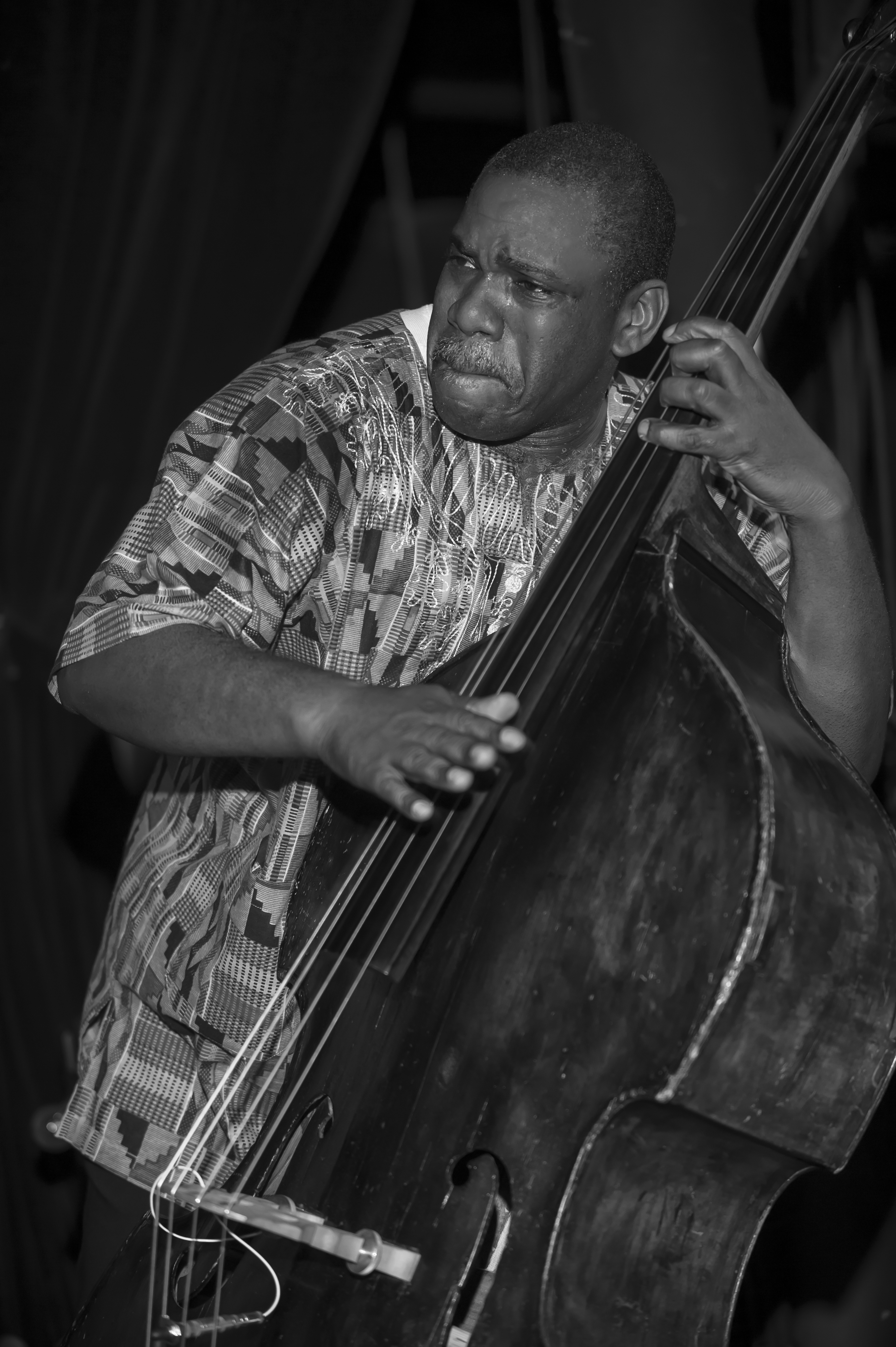
Hilliard Greene, Vision XIII Festival

As leader

- Alone (Soulsearch Music, 2003)

With Billy Bang

- Da Bang! (TUM, 2013)

With Marc Edwards (drummer)

- Time & Space
- Red Sprites Blue Jets

With The Jazz Expressions

- The Jazz Expressions, Bluejay Records
- Yoyogi, Bluejay Records
- On The Road, Wildflower Publications

With Jemeel Moondoc

- Cosmic Nickelodeon (Relative Pitch, 2016)
- The Astral Revelations (RogueArt, 2018)

With Ullmann/Swell 4 with Barry Altschul

- Desert Songs and Other Landscapes (CIMP, 2004)
- News? No News! (Jazzwerskstatt, 2010)
- Live in Montreal (CIMP, 2010)
- We're Playing in Here? (NoBusiness, 2022)

With William Hooker

- Flesh and Bones (2023)

== Bibliography ==
- Richard Cook, Brian Morton: The Penguin Guide to Jazz on CD. 6th edition, London: Penguin, 2002. ISBN 0-14-017949-6
