= Live at Dreher, Paris 1981 =

Live at Dreher, Paris, 1981

Live album by Mal Waldron & Steve Lacy
- Released: 1981
- Recorded: August 10, 13, 14 & 15, 1981
- Genre: Jazz
- Label: Hat Hut
- Producer: Pia Uehlinger and Werner X. Uehlinger

Mal Waldron chronology
News: Run About Mal (1981)	Live at Dreher, Paris, 1981 (1981)	What It Is (1981)

Steve Lacy chronology
Ballets (1981)	Live at Dreher, Paris 1981 (1981)	The Flame (1982)

Live at Dreher, Paris 1981 is a live album by American jazz pianist Mal Waldron and soprano saxophonist Steve Lacy, recorded in Paris in 1981 and released by the Hathut label. The four-CD box set combines recordings previously released on the LPs Snake Out in 1983, Herbe De L'oubli in 1986 and Let's Call This in 1986, with additional recordings from the concert series. The recordings were also released as two double-CD sets Live at Dreher, Paris 1981: Round Midnight Vol. 1 and Live at Dreher, Paris 1981: The Peak Vol. 2.

== Reception ==
The AllMusic review by Thom Jurek stated, "Lacy and Waldron display what so few duets in jazz history have been able to conjure: true synchronicity. This is a wonderfully gratifying set; one only wishes she or he could have been there". The review by Bill Shoemaker in JazzTimes said that "for anyone with a serious interest in either artist, Live at Dreher Paris 1981 is an essential collection. By this time in their respective developments, both artists had stripped their approaches down to the bare essentials".

Professional ratings
Review scores
Source	Rating
AllMusic	4.5/5 stars
The Penguin Guide to Jazz Recordings	4/4 stars

== Track listing ==
All compositions by Mal Waldron except as indicated
Disc one

1. "Let's Call This" (Thelonious Monk) — 7:48
2. "'Round Midnight" (Monk) — 10:32
3. "No Baby" (Steve Lacy) — 11:24
4. "Herb de L'oublie" (Lacy) — 11:14
5. "Snake Out" — 15:02

Disc two

1. "'Round Midnight" (Monk) — 13:22 Originally released on Let's Call This
2. "Deep Endeavours" — 13:10 Originally released on Let's Call This
3. "A Case of Plus 4's" — 10:17 Originally released on Snake Out
4. "The Seagulls of Kristiansund" — 10:23
5. "Snake Out" — 13:16 Originally released on Snake Out

Disc three

1. "Bone" (Lacy) — 10:45 Originally released on Let's Call This
2. "No Baby" (Lacy) — 13:25 Originally released on Snake Out
3. "Blinks" (Lacy) — 11:37 Originally released on Snake Out
4. "I Feel a Draft" (Lacy) — 10:48 Originally released on Let's Call This
5. "'Round Midnight" (Monk) — 12:37
6. "Well, You Needn't" (Monk) — 10:01
7. "Epistrophy" (Monk) — 7:44

Disc four

1. "The Peak" — 17:11 Originally released on Let's Call This
2. "Herbe de L'oubli" (Lacy) — 11:09 Originally released on Herbe De L'oubli
3. "Hooray for Herbie" — 17:40 Originally released on Herbe De L'oubli
4. "Let's Call This" (Monk) — 6:59 Originally released on Let's Call This
5. "Epistrophy" (Monk) — 7:27 Originally released on Herbe De L'oubli
6. "Well You Needn't" (Monk) — 7:54 Originally released on Let's Call This

- Recorded at Dreher, Paris, on August 10 (disc one tracks 1 & 2), August 13 (disc one tracks 3–5 & disc two track 1), August 14 (disc two tracks 2–5 & disc three) and August 15 (disc four), 1981

== Personnel ==
- Mal Waldron — piano
- Steve Lacy — soprano saxophone
