= Sanctuary (Dave Douglas album) =

Live album by Dave Douglas
- Released: 1997
- Recorded: August 6 & 27 1997; Knitting Factory, NYC
- Genre: Jazz
- Length: 54:21
- Label: Avant; Avan 066
- Producer: Dave Douglas

Dave Douglas chronology
Live in Europe (1997)	Sanctuary (1997)	Stargazer (1997)

Professional ratings
Review scores
Source	Rating
Allmusic	4/5 stars

Sanctuary is the seventh album by trumpeter Dave Douglas and his second live album. It was released on the Japanese Avant label in 1997 and features performances by Douglas, Cuong Vu, Yuka Honda, Anthony Coleman, Mark Dresser, Hilliard Greene, Chris Speed and Dougie Bowne.

According to the album's liner notes, Sanctuary was loosely inspired by Ascension, a 1966 album by John Coltrane. Douglas borrowed the basic concept of a larger ensemble than his usual groups of the era, where the performers were given a basic musical structure around which they improvised. Onstage for the performances recorded for Sanctuary, the band members were organized with trios of trumpeter, keyboardist and bassist on each side of the stage while the drummer and saxophonist were in the middle.

== Reception ==
The Allmusic review by Joslyn Layne states "Although Dave Douglas is credited as leader, Sanctuary is not just an album of him supported by a backing band. Instead, Douglas plays as equal member in a project of standout musicians. ...Part abstract space shooting, part late-night dance party, all mixed with the scratching and balladry of outside jazz, Sanctuary is a definite strong addition to any collection that values these musicians, and a good introduction to them for all adventurous listeners ready to jump right in".

== Track listing ==
- Part One (Disc 1)
1. "Apparition" - 9:07
2. "Three Beasts" - 6:27
3. "Swoon" - 6:57
4. "The Lethe" - 3:48
5. "Dark Wood" - 5:20
6. "The Dome" - 6:35
7. "Heavenly Messenger" - 11:44
8. "Among Frogs" - 4:23
- Part Two (Disc 2)
1. "Limbo" - 6:36
2. "The Great Cliff" - 4:43
3. "The Lantern" - 11:52
4. "Mad Dog" - 7:39
5. "The Flower" - 9:13
6. "Contemplation" - 5:50
7. "Coins" - 9:34
8. "Among Stars" - 2:44

All compositions by Dave Douglas
- Part One (Disc 1) recorded at Knitting Factory, New York City on August 6, 1996; Part Two (Disc 2) recorded at Knitting Factory, New York City on August 27, 1996

== Personnel ==
- Dave Douglas: trumpet
- Cuong Vu: trumpet
- Yuka Honda: sampler
- Anthony Coleman: sampler
- Mark Dresser: bass
- Hilliard Greene: bass
- Chris Speed: tenor saxophone, clarinet
- Dougie Bowne: drums
