= Da Bang! =

Studio album by Billy Bang
- Released: June 18, 2013
- Recorded: February 2 and 3, 2011
- Studio: Studio MI, Finnish Broadcasting Company, Helsinki, Finland
- Genre: Jazz
- Length: 58:02
- Label: Tum Records; CD 034

Billy Bang chronology
Black Man's Blues (2011)	Da Bang! (2013)	Medicine Buddha (2014)

Da Bang! is an album by violinist Billy Bang. It was recorded on February 2 and 3, 2011, roughly two months before Bang's death, at Studio MI of the Finnish Broadcasting Company in Helsinki, Finland, and was released on June 18, 2013, by Tum Records. On the album, Bang is joined by trombonist Dick Griffin, pianist Andrew Bemkey, double bassist Hilliard Greene, and drummer Newman Taylor Baker. The recording features one composition each by Bang, Barry Altschul, Don Cherry, Ornette Coleman, Miles Davis, and Sonny Rollins.

== Reception ==
Professional ratings
Review scores
Source	Rating
All About Jazz	4/5 stars
All About Jazz	4.5/5 stars
All About Jazz	4.5/5 stars
All About Jazz	3.5/5 stars
All About Jazz	3.5/5 stars
All About Jazz	4/5 stars
The Irish Times	4/5 stars
PopMatters	7/10 stars

In a review for PopMatters, John Garratt wrote: "Do you know what the difference is between a sad farewell and going out on a happy high note? It's Billy Bang playing 'All Blues' and 'St. Thomas', that's what. To listen to Da Bang! while thinking about death isn't an act of moping. It's reflection, the satisfaction that comes with a life well lived and a career worth preserving for the next generation."

Cormac Larkin of The Irish Times stated: "Fans of the violin in jazz have precious little to choose from..., so this final album from the late Billy Bang will prick a few ears... Bang – who knew he was dying of cancer – delivers a last testament shot through with emotion, referencing the key influences on his music."

Point of Departure's Ed Hazell commented: "As farewell statements go, Da Bang! is a wise and joyful one... It wouldn't be right to call Da Bang! a career summary, but accumulated years of playing experience can be heard in every note Billy Bang plays on it. Instead Da Bang! is the final exclamation point to Billy Bang's long shout of joy and pain."

Writing for The Whole Note, Stuart Broomer remarked: "The front line of Bang's eerily thin violin sound and Dick Griffin's robust trombone is very distinctive, emphasizing the combination of frailty and force that gives Bang's work a special intensity... The band sounds as if Bang assembled it for maximum authority... Da Bang! is a powerful final testament."

In one of six All About Jazz reviews, Hrayr Attarian called the recording a "landmark release" and "a sublime album of rich harmonies, multifaceted emotions, and tight, intellectually stimulating spontaneity." AAJ's Dan McClenaghan noted that Bang's music "is often quite beautiful in its exuberance while compelling in its rough-hewn folksiness," and stated that the tracks "brim with Bang's infectious joy of creation." Troy Collins described the album as "a poignant farewell from a singular artist whose creative legacy will undoubtedly continue to inspire future generations," while John Sharpe praised the "unvarnished verité of the recording, which allows every nuance of string, gut and wood to conjoin in a poignantly vulnerable tone." Glenn Astarita stated that Bang's "artistic brilliance and total command of the jazz vernacular is passionately conveyed here," and Eyal Hareuveni called Da Bang! "A beautiful reminder of Bang the master musician, composer, improviser and a great human being."

Michael Ullman of The Arts Fuse remarked: "Bang played in formidable avant-garde groups, but there is nothing forbidding about his music or his exciting approach to improvisation. His was not what you would call a classical technique: but it was uniquely his, though, and it will be missed."

Writing for Something Else!, S. Victor Aaron commented: "The living vitality of his violin is manifestly evident in a man still at the peak of his powers, plucking, strumming, scraping and so rhythmically aware... He didn't get a chance to script his parting statement the world, but it's not inconceivable that he wouldn't have done it any differently than what he did with Da Bang!."

== Track listing ==
1. "Da Bang" (Barry Altschul) – 8:16
2. "Guinea" (Don Cherry) – 12:26
3. "Daydreams" (Billy Bang) – 13:53
4. "Law Years" (Ornette Coleman) – 7:49
5. "All Blues" (Miles Davis) – 10:06
6. "St. Thomas" (Sonny Rollins) – 5:14

== Personnel ==
- Billy Bang – violin
- Dick Griffin – trombone
- Andrew Bemkey – piano
- Hilliard Greene – double bass
- Newman Taylor Baker – drums
