= Spirit House (album) =

Live album by Jemeel Moondoc
- Released: 2001
- Recorded: March 30, 2000
- Venue: UMASS, Amherst, Massachusetts
- Genre: Jazz
- Length: 73:52
- Label: Eremite
- Producer: Michael Ehlers

Jemeel Moondoc chronology
New World Pygmies (1999)	Spirit House (2001)	Revolt of the Negro Lawn Jockeys (2001)

Spirit House is an album by American jazz saxophonist Jemeel Moondoc, which was recorded live in 2000 at the Magic Triangle Jazz Series organized by the University of Massachusetts Amherst and released on the Eremite label. It was the debut recording by the Jus Grew Orchestra, a large ensemble founded by Moondoc in the early 80s. For this concert Moondoc studied Butch Morris's conduction techniques of guided improvisation with hand gestures. Morris was the original conductor of the band.

== Reception ==
Professional ratings
Review scores
Source	Rating
AllMusic	4/5 stars
The Penguin Guide to Jazz	3/4 stars

In his review for AllMusic, Steve Loewy states "Some listeners may be reminded of some of Henry Threadgill's non-electric, early group efforts, which combined quirky melodies with non-swinging bursts of flaming brass. Moondoc translates the concept to a larger structure, with his own individual stamp and raucous ensemble writing."

The Penguin Guide to Jazz notes that the live sound is inadequate, but says "This is a bustling, often teeming music, brought vividly to life and, given a full and flattering sound, the tremendous blow-out of 'Spirit House' itself would really shake the timbers."

In a double review for JazzTimes, Daniel Piotrowski also remarks the deficient sound mix, but states "The band is handed great compositions and make the most of them by changing speeds adeptly, without making the music seem too hectic. The 26-minute title track is an excellent example of the agile band, which joins together for brief interludes and then passes the baton from soloist to soloist."

== Track listing ==
All compositions by Jemeel Moondoc

1. "Quick Pick" - 10:47
2. "Brass Monkeys" - 9:08
3. "Flora" - 14:54
4. "Spirit House" - 26:32
5. "End Game" - 3:17
6. "In Walked Monk" - 9:14

== Personnel ==
- Jemeel Moondoc - alto sax, conduction
- Lewis 'Flip' Barnes - trumpet
- Roy Campbell - trumpet
- Tyrone Hill - trombone
- Michael Marcus - baritone sax
- Zane Massey - tenor sax
- Codaryl Moffett - drums
- Bern Nix - guitar
- Steve Swell - trombone
- John Voigt - bass
