= Perception (Connie Crothers album) =

Studio album by Connie Crothers
- Released: 1974
- Recorded: Summer 1974
- Genre: Jazz
- Length: 46:19
- Label: SteepleChase; SCS 1022
- Producer: Nils Winther

Connie Crothers chronology
Perception (1974)	Solo (1974)

Perception is the debut album by pianist Connie Crothers recorded in 1974 and released on the Danish label, SteepleChase.

== Reception ==
Professional ratings
Review scores
Source	Rating
AllMusic	4/5 stars
The Penguin Guide to Jazz	2.5/4 stars

Scott Yanow of AllMusic states, "It is ironic that Lennie Tristano is quoted in the liner notes as calling Crothers the most original musician he has worked with for at this early point; Crothers sounded like a close relative of Tristano's. She does show some of her own musical personality in spots, and the music (eight of her originals, plus "My Old Flame" and "All the Things You Are") holds one's interest". The Penguin Guide to Jazz also commented on the similarities between the two pianists and mentioned the album's "preponderance of literal translations of themes like the title-track."

== Track listing ==
All compositions by Connie Crothers except where noted.

1. "Lennie's Scene" – 5:46
2. "Free-Way" – 2:37
3. "Labyrinth" – 3:19
4. "Hillside Avenue" – 5:54
5. "Three-Way" – 4:19
6. "Perception" – 4:13
7. "Convergence" – 5:35
8. "Vibrations" – 4:20
9. "My Old Flame" (Sam Coslow, Arthur Johnston) – 3:33
10. "All the Things You Are" (Jerome Kern, Oscar Hammerstein II) – 5:40

== Personnel ==
- Connie Crothers – piano
- Joe Solomon – bass
- Roger Mancuso – drums
