= Konstanze's Delight =

Live album by Jemeel Moondoc
- Released: 1983
- Recorded: October 24, 1981
- Venue: 3rd Street Music School, New York City
- Genre: Jazz
- Length: 45:24
- Label: Soul Note
- Producer: Jemeel Moondoc

Jemeel Moondoc chronology
| The Athens Concert (1982) | Konstanze's Delight (1983) | Nostalgia in Times Square (1986) |

Konstanze's Delight is an album by American jazz saxophonist Jemeel Moondoc, which was recorded live at the Third Street Music School in 1981 and released on the Italian Soul Note label. He leads a sextet that features Muntu's members Roy Campbell on trumpet and William Parker on double bass, occasional members Khan Jamal on vibraphone and Ellen Christi on wordless vocals, and Denis Charles on drums.

== Reception ==
Professional ratings
Review scores
| Source | Rating |
|---|---|
| The Penguin Guide to Jazz | 3/4 stars |
| The Encyclopedia of Popular Music | 3/5 stars |

The Penguin Guide to Jazz notes "The two horns seem to be engaged in a game of one-on-one ball, chasing, dodging, body-checking and setting up half a dozen false climaxes before the whole thing unwinds."

== Track listing ==
All compositions by Jemeel Moondoc

1. "Konstanze's Delight" - 29:46
2. "Chasing the Moon" - 13:17
3. "High Rise" - 2:21

== Personnel ==
- Roy Campbell - trumpet
- Jemeel Moondoc - alto sax
- Khan Jamal - vibraphone
- William Parker - bass
- Denis Charles - drums
- Ellen Christi - voice
