= Judy's Bounce =

Live album by Jemeel Moondoc
- Released: 1982
- Recorded: November 9, 1981
- Venue: New York University Loeb Student Center, New York City
- Genre: Jazz
- Length: 44:43
- Label: Soul Note
- Producer: Jemeel Moondoc

Jemeel Moondoc chronology
We Don't (2003)	Judy's Bounce (1982)	The Athens Concert (1982)

Judy's Bounce is an album by American jazz saxophonist Jemeel Moondoc, which was recorded live in 1981 and released on the Italian Soul Note label. He leads a trio with bassist Fred Hopkins and drummer Ed Blackwell. The title track is dedicated to concert producer Judy Sneed.

== Reception ==
Professional ratings
Review scores
Source	Rating
The Penguin Guide to Jazz	3/4 stars
The Encyclopedia of Popular Music	3/5 stars

The Penguin Guide to Jazz notes "His early group, Ensemble Muntu, was very much in the Taylor mould, but Moondoc remained open to other influences as well. 'One for Ornette' accounts for only the most obvious; his playing style sits somewhere between Ornette's country wail and Jimmy Lyons' street-corner preaching."

== Track listing ==
All compositions by Jemeel Moondoc

1. "Judy's Bounce" - 8:43
2. "Echo in Blue" - 13:42
3. "One for Ornette" - 8:40
4. "Nimus" - 13:38

== Personnel ==
- Jemeel Moondoc - alto sax
- Fred Hopkins - bass
- Ed Blackwell - drums
