= Veronique Doumbe =

Cameroonian and West Indian independent filmmaker

- Born: Veronique Doumbe; France
- Occupation(s): Independent film director, producer, screenwriter, editor
- Years active: 2002–present
- Known for: Director of The Birthday Party (2009)

Veronique Doumbe is a Cameroonian and West Indian independent filmmaker. She is the founder of Ndolo Films and is known as the director of The Birthday Party (2009), the 2010 winner of the Berlin Black International Cinema Festival Prize Best Film or Video Depicting the Black Experience. She is the director of "Quarter Life Crisis", "Woman to Woman" and other films.

== Career and advocacy ==
Veronique is an advocate for women filmmakers finding places outside of traditional Hollywood's "big machine" to reach their audiences. She sees technology and new advances in ways to seek funding for movies and their distribution as expanding opportunities for filmmakers who may otherwise not have the opportunity.

Doumbe is a member of Film Fatale, an organization aimed at supporting inclusive communities of women filmmakers to share resources and collaborate on projects.

== Personal life ==
Doumbe was born in France and raised in France, Cameroon, and the Ivory Coast. Her mother is from the West Indian island nation of Martinique and her father is Cameroonian. She has lived in the United States for over 35 years and resides in New York City.
