= First Feeding =

Studio album by Jemeel Moondoc
- Released: 1977
- Recorded: April 17, 1977
- Studio: Bob Blank Studios, New York City
- Genre: Jazz
- Length: 39:43
- Label: Muntu
- Producer: Piano Magic & Ensemble Muntu

Jemeel Moondoc chronology
First Feeding (1977)	The Evening of the Blue Men (1979)

First Feeding is the debut album by American jazz saxophonist Jemeel Moondoc with the Ensemble Muntu, which was recorded in 1977 and released on his own Muntu label. The album was reissued in 2009 as part of the three-CD box Muntu Recordings on the Lithuanian NoBusiness label.

== Background ==
Moondoc and Jesse Sharps, a saxophonist from Los Angeles who was a member of Horace Tapscott’s UGMAA, co-founded the Ensemble Muntu in the fall of 1971 at Antioch College in Yellow Springs, Ohio. The name Muntu, a Bantu word usually translated as "man," was inspired by the book Muntu: The New African Culture by Janheinz Jahn. At that time, Muntu was a 12-piece band, composed mostly of students of Cecil Taylor who played in his Black Music Ensemble. For a short time, Muntu was a quintet co-led by Moondoc and trumpeter Arthur Williams.

In the summer of 1973, Moondoc and pianist Mark Hennen, who had also studied with Taylor at Antioch, left Yellow Springs and headed for New York City. In the beginning of the Loft Jazz period, they reconnected with Williams and asked bassist William Parker and drummer Rashied Sinan to join the band. With this lineup, Muntu made its first performance in NYC in December 1973 at Sam Rivers' Studio Rivbea. The quintet’s personnel, with Rashid Bakr replacing Sinan, remained essentially unchanged from the summer of 1974 until the spring of 1978.

== Reception ==
In a review of the Muntu box for AllAboutJazz, John Sharpe says about the album "Together with the cellular keyboard motifs, the simultaneous horn lines of the leader and trumpeter Arthur Williams bear the hallmark of Cecil Taylor's groups at the time (unsurprising given the recent participation of Moondoc et al in Taylor's ensembles at Antioch College in Yellow Springs, Ohio), particularly in the discursively voiced elegiac themes with their deliciously ragged feel."

Writer Graham Reid included the recording in his list of "10 Rare Free Jazz Albums I'm Proud to Own," and remarked: "This is a go-to album for anyone who thinks free jazz is just the cacophonous result of a bunch of people all playing different things at the same time. Ensemble Muntu work together as much as off each other... There is a real discipline at work here, especially when Moondoc and Williams bring martial sounds to the title track and a real pathos and yearning on the closing passages of the 14-minute 'Flight'."

Critic Barry McRae wrote: "Each [composition] is introduced with a well controlled unison, before the group take to freer areas, either contrapuntally or in solo sequence. Both Moondoc and Williams are animated players... the entire record must to rated as a fine first outing for a young group with potential."

Regarding the title track, Clifford Allen wrote: "It's hard not to make a comparison to [Cecil] Taylor's work... At this stage, Hennen is less blocky and more florid in his dusky exploration of cells... The fat tonal bricks and hot, slow blasts of sound that Williams unspools are indebted to Dixon, while comparisons with Silva and Cyrille are apt in the initial rustling interplay of cello and percussion. Once the improvisation begins, however, it's clear that Muntu is its own group. Sections of sound climb over each other and soon become a whirlwind dance, as the rhythms flit and jump in taut angles, Hennen shortening his phrases into stabs around Bakr and Parker's darting blinks. By the piece's end, there's a folksy revision of the theme that makes the front line sound more Ornette-ish than Jimmy Lyons and Dixon might have preferred."

== Track listing ==
All compositions by Jemeel Moondoc

1. "First Feeding" - 5:09
2. "Flight (From the Yellow Dog)" - 13:57
3. "Theme for Milford (Mr. Body & Soul)" - 20:37

== Personnel ==
- Jemeel Moondoc - alto sax
- Arthur Williams - trumpet
- Mark Hennen - piano
- William Parker - bass
- Rashid Bakr - drums
