= Buell Neidlinger =

American jazz cellist and double bassist (1936–2018)

Buell Neidlinger (March 2, 1936 – March 16, 2018) was an American cellist and double bassist. He worked with a variety of pop and jazz performers, prominently with iconoclastic pianist Cecil Taylor in the 1950s and '60s.

== Biography ==
Neidlinger was born in New York City to the former Jane Buell and Roger Nidlinger. He was raised in Westport, Connecticut, where his father ran a cargo shipping business. He played cello in his youth, and began studying double bass after a music teacher recommended it to strengthen his hands. He took lessons from jazz bassist Walter Page. In his teens, Neidlinger suffered a nervous breakdown which he attributed to the pressure of being perceived as a child prodigy on cello. While institutionalized, he met jazz pianist Joe Sullivan who was in treatment for alcoholism.

Neidlinger dropped out of Yale University after one year, where he had been studying orchestral music. He moved to New York City and began playing in various jazz settings. He joined Cecil Taylor's group in 1955, played with Herbie Nichols and recorded extensively with Taylor's groups with Steve Lacy and with Archie Shepp among others until 1961. He was also involved with new directions in classical music (John Cage, Mauricio Kagel, George Crumb) and Gunther Schuller' s Third Stream music.

In 1971, Neidlinger moved to California. He became the principal bassist for the Los Angeles Chamber Orchestra and was also principal bassist in the Warner Bros. studio orchestra for 30 years. He worked extensively as an orchestral and as a session bassist before becoming a musical educator at the New England Conservatory and CalArts. Together with Marty Krystall he founded K2B2 Records. The sessions Neidlinger performed on as a strings player included Tony Bennett's "I Left My Heart In San Francisco" and the Eagles' "Hotel California".

For a short time in the spring of 1974, Neidlinger played bass with Jerry Garcia, David Grisman, and others in the Great American String Band. The Great American String Band played bluegrass and American roots music in and around the Bay Area for about three months.

In 1983, he performed on the Antilles Records release Swingrass '83. In 1997, Neidlinger moved to Whidbey Island, Washington State. There, he played in a band called Buellgrass, which included fiddler Richard Greene and featured their version of bluegrass music. Neidlinger's fourth wife, Margaret Storer, was also a bass player. They played baroque music with friends; he played cello, while she played violin.

Neidlinger's final recording was The Happenings, accompanied by Howard Alden on guitar and Marty Krystall on bass clarinet and flute, released in December 2017.

== Discography ==
=== As leader ===
- 1961: New York City R&B (Barnaby) with Cecil Taylor
- 1980: Ready for the 90's (K2B2 2069) as Krystall Klear and the Buells
- 1981: Our Night Together (K2B2 2169) as Krystall Klear and the Buells
- 1983: Big Day at Ojai (K2B2 2369) as Buellgrass
- 1983: Marty's Garage (K2B2 2269)
- 1987: Thelonious (K2B2 2569)
- 1987: Buell Neidlinger Quartet Live at Ravenna Jazz '87 with Special Guest Steve Lacy (K2B2 3969) with Steve Lacy
- 1989: 2 by 2 (K2B2 4169) with Anthony Braxton
- 1989: The Complete Candid Recordings of Cecil Taylor and Buell Neidlinger (Mosaic) with Cecil Taylor
- 1989: Aurora (Denon 73148) as Aurora
- 1990: Big Drum (K2B2 3069)
- 1991: Locomotive (Soul Note)
- 1995: Blue Chopsticks – A Portrait of Herbie Nichols (K2B2 3169)
- 1996: Across the Tracks (K2B2 6923)
- 1997: Rear View Mirror (K2B2 2969)
- 2001: Thelonious Atmosphere (K2B2 3269)
- 2005: All Strung Out. Adventures in Buellgrass. (K2B2 3569)
- 2005: Krystall Klear and the Buells - This Way Is West (K2B2 3369)
- 2009: Basso Profundo (Vivace 8001)

=== As sideman ===
With Darol Anger

- 1999: Diary of a Fiddler (Compass)

With Bee Gees

- 1968: I Started A Joke (Capitol Records)

With Ruben Blades

- 1988: Nothing But the Truth (Elektra)

With Anthony Braxton

- 1987: Six Monk's Compositions (Black Saint)

With Natalie Cole

- 1991: Unforgettable (Elektra)

With Ry Cooder

- 1987: Get Rhythm (Warner Bros.)

With Stewart Copeland

- 1983: Rumblefish (Original Motion Picture Soundtrack) (A&M)

With Diane Schuur

- 1992: In Tribute (GPR)

With Lionel Richie

- 1982: Lionel Richie (Motown)

With Elvis Costello

- 1989: Spike (Warner Bros.)

With Lindsey Buckingham

- 1992: Out of the Cradle (Mercury)

With Earth, Wind, and Fire

- 1980: Faces (Columbia)

With Michael Bolton

- 1992: Timeless: The Classics (Columbia)
- 1996: This Is The Time: The Christmas Album (Columbia)

With Curtis Stigers

- 1995: Time Was (Arista)

With Duane Eddy

- 1987: Duane Eddy (Capitol)

With Yvonne Elliman

- 1979: Yvonne (RSO)

With Neil Diamond

- 1977: I'm Glad You're Here with Me Tonight (Columbia)

With Richard Greene

- 1979: Ramblin' (Rounder)
- 1997: Sales Tax Toddle (Rebel)
- 1996: Wolves A' Howlin' (Rebel)

With Jimmy Giuffre

- 1960: The Jimmy Giuffre Quartet in Person (Verve)

With Kenny Rogers

- 1985: The Heart of the Matter (RCA)
- 1994: Timepiece (143)

With Clint Black

- 1993: No Time to Kill (RCA)
- 1994: One Emotion (RCA)

With David Grisman

- 1978: Hot Dawg (Horizon)

With Leo Kottke

- 1986: A Shout Toward Noon (Private Music)
- 1988: Regards from Chuck Pink (Private Music)

With Steve Lacy

- 1958: Soprano Sax (Prestige)
- 1959: Reflections (New Jazz)

With Roy Orbison

- 1989: Mystery Girl (Virgin)
- 1992: King of Hearts (Virgin)

With Peter Allen

- 1976: Taught by Experts (A&M)

With Jean-Luc Ponty and Frank Zappa

- 1970: King Kong (World Pacific)
- 1976: Cantaloupe Island (Blue Note)

With Van Dyke Parks

- 1972: Discover America (Warner Bros.)
- 1989: Tokyo Rose (Warner Bros.)

With Sam Phillips

- 1988: The Indescribable Wow (Virgin)

With Bonnie Raitt

- 1994: Longing in Their Hearts (Capitol)

With Peter Rowan

- 1978: Peter Rowan (Flying Fish)
- 1996: Bluegrass Boy (Sugar Hill)

With Bob Seger

- 1991: The Fire Inside (Capitol)
- 1995: It's a Mystery (Capitol)

With Frank Sinatra

- 1993: Duets (Capitol)

With Pops Staples

- 1992: Peace to the Neighborhood (PointBlank)

With Ringo Starr and Harry Nilsson

- 1988: Stay Awake: Various Interpretations of Music from Vintage Disney Films (A&M)

With Barbra Streisand

- 1994: Ordinary Miracles (Columbia)

With Cecil Taylor

- 1956: Jazz Advance (Transition)
- 1958: At Newport (Verve)
- 1959: Looking Ahead! (Contemporary)
- 1959: Love for Sale (United Artists)
- 1959: In Transition (Blue Note)
- 1960: The World of Cecil Taylor (Candid)
- 1960: Air (Candid)
- 1961: Cell Walk for Celeste (Candid)
- 1961: Jumpin' Punkins (Candid)

With The Beach Boys

- 1988: Cocktail (Original Motion Picture Soundtrack) (Elektra)

== Featured classics ==
- Franz Schubert: Quintet in A op. 114 ("Trout") with Peter Serkin and Tashi (RCA ARLI1882)
- Paul Chihara: GRASS Concerto for Bass and Orchestra London Symphony Orchestra (Turnabout 34372)
- Los Angeles Chamber Orchestra with Neville Marriner (Angel 537081)
- Respighi: Ancient Airs and Dances Neville Marriner / Los Angeles Chamber Orchestra (Angel CDC - 7471162)
- Los Angeles Chamber Orchestra with Neville Marriner (Argo ZRG 792)
- Basso Profundo. Solo bass and chamber music by Bussotti, Rosenman, Kagel, Xenakis and Ceely. (Vivace Records)
