= Đàn đá =

Vietnamese instrument

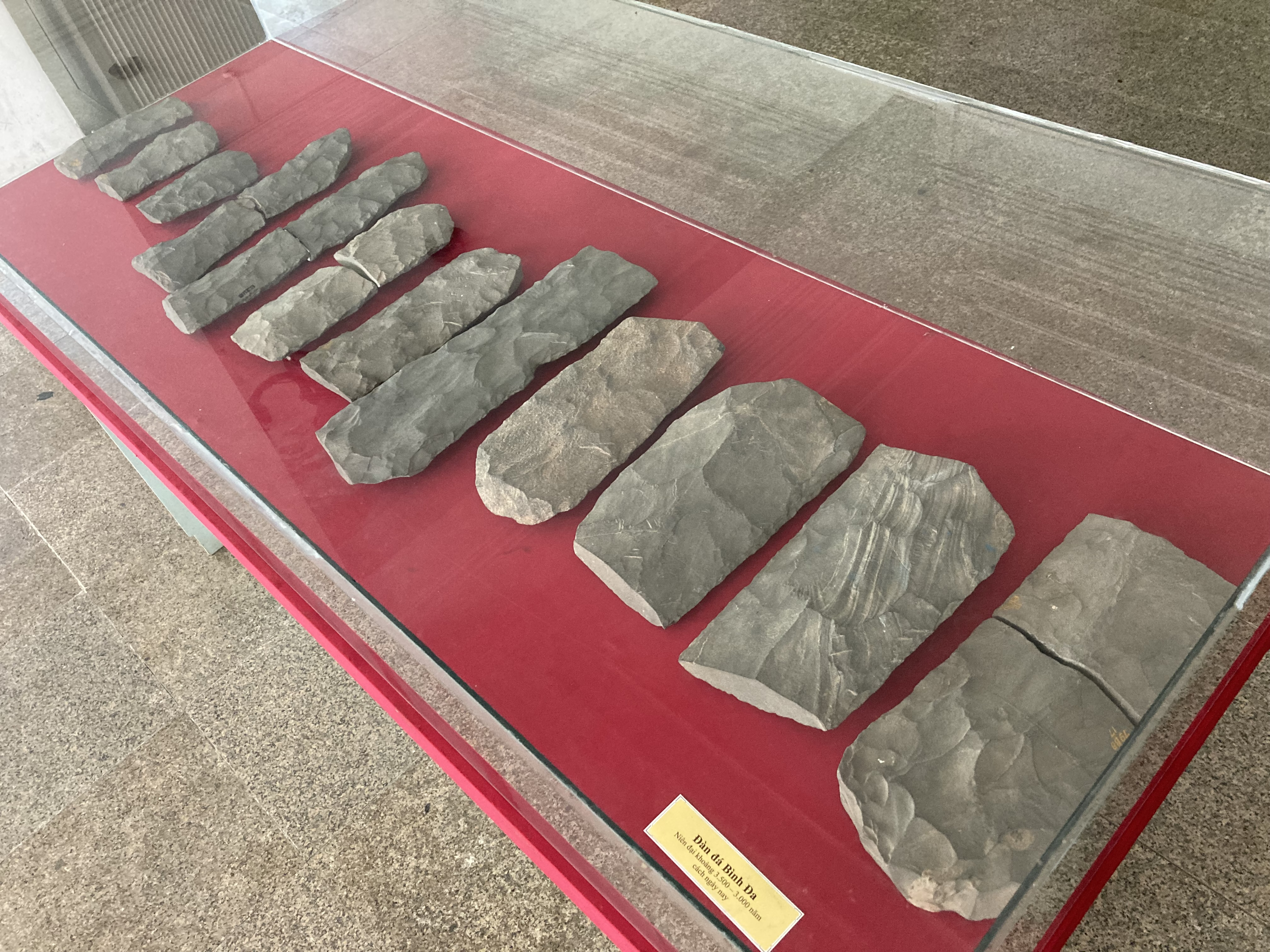
A set of lithophone found at Bình Đa, Đồng Nai

The đàn đá is a lithophone played by ethnic minority groups in the Central Highlands of Vietnam, in the provinces of Lâm Đồng, Đắk Nông, Đắk Lắk, Gia Lai, and Kon Tum. These provinces are also home of the space of Gong culture listed in UNESCO's World Heritage Site. The word đá means "stone" in Vietnamese, đàn is instrument. The term đàn đá is of recent origin among Vietnamese musicologists, it had also been referred to as a đàn goong, a Vietnamese gong.

Several stones of different sizes are placed in a row. The player then uses a stick to knock the stones, each of which produces a different tone. The stone music sounds like the rhythm of the streams and bird songs, and therefore goes well with the surrounding landscape. One of the oldest stone musical instruments ever discovered was found in this area, dating back more than 2,000 years ago.

It is also played by Viet people in nhạc dân tộc cải biên, a form of modern composed classical music, which is often performed for tourists.
