= New York City R&B =

Studio album by Buell Neidlinger / Cecil Taylor
- Released: 1972
- Recorded: January 9 & 10, 1961
- Genre: Jazz
- Length: 36:23
- Label: Barnaby
- Producer: Nat Hentoff

Cecil Taylor chronology
| Jumpin' Punkins (1961) | New York City R&B (1972) | Into the Hot (1961) |

New York City R&B is a 1961 free jazz album originally recorded at a session by bassist Buell Neidlinger but subsequently reissued under joint names with the pianist Cecil Taylor.

== Reception ==
Professional ratings
Review scores
| Source | Rating |
|---|---|
| AllMusic | 4.5/5 stars |
| The Penguin Guide to Jazz Recordings | 3.5/4 stars |

Writing for AllMusic, Scott Yanow commented: "The music is quite advanced for the period, although more accessible to the average listener than Taylor's later recordings; one can hear, even in abstract form, his connection to the bebop tradition and to Duke Ellington."

== Track listing ==
1. "O.P." (Buell Neidlinger) - 9:15
2. "Cell Walk for Celeste" [Take 8] (Cecil Taylor) - 11:38
3. "Cindy's Main Mood" (Billy Higgins, Neidlinger, Taylor) - 5:14
4. "Things Ain't What they Used to Be" [Take 1] (Mercer Ellington) - 10:07

- Recorded at Nola's Penthouse Sound Studios, NYC, January 9 & 10, 1961

== Personnel ==
- Cecil Taylor - piano
- Buell Neidlinger - bass
- Archie Shepp - tenor saxophone
- Clark Terry - trumpet
- Steve Lacy - soprano saxophone
- Roswell Rudd - trombone
- Charles Davis - baritone saxophone
- Denis Charles - drums
- Billy Higgins - drums
