= Moods: Playing with the Elements =

Studio album by Trio X
- Released: 2005
- Recorded: October 20 & 21, 2004 at The Spirit Room in Rossie, New York.
- Genre: Jazz
- Length: 71:30
- Label: CIMP CIMP 328
- Producer: Bob Rusch

Joe McPhee chronology
The Sugar Hill Suite (2004)	Moods: Playing with the Elements (2005)	Roulette at Location One (2005)

Moods: Playing with the Elements is a studio album performed by multi-instrumentalist Joe McPhee's Trio X recorded in 2002 and first released on the CIMP label.

== Reception ==
Professional ratings
Review scores
Source	Rating
Allmusic	3.5/5 stars
The Penguin Guide to Jazz Recordings	4/4 stars

Allmusic reviewer Steve Loewy states "While there are some wonderful moments on this recording -- McPhee's astonishing sax solo and Rosen's muscular backing on "Wegatchie Run" come to mind—as a whole this set is not as consistently compelling as others in the oeuvre of the group". In JazzTimes Marc Masters wrote "On Moods, McPhee stretches further, playing flugelhorn and pocket trumpet, plus more rippling tenor sax. The trio's patterns also widen: often, one player will retreat completely".

== Track listing ==
All compositions by Joe McPhee, Dominic Duval and Jay Rosen except as indicated

1. "Sienna Sun" - 8:00
2. "Wegatchie Run" - 7:22
3. "Burning Wood" - 11:21
4. "Dedicated to You, Joe" (Dominic Duval) - 3:51
5. "Stella by Starlight" (Ned Washington, Victor Young) - 6:07
6. "In Evidence" - 3:39
7. "Lonely Woman" - 2:55
8. "Short Eyes" - 4:18
9. "Legacy" - 5:23
10. "Voices" (Joe McPhee) - 7:38
11. "A Valentine in the Fog of War" - 10:56

== Personnel ==
- Joe McPhee - tenor saxophone, flugelhorn, pocket trumpet
- Dominic Duval - bass
- Jay Rosen - drums
