= Mark Whitecage =

American saxophonist (1937–2021)

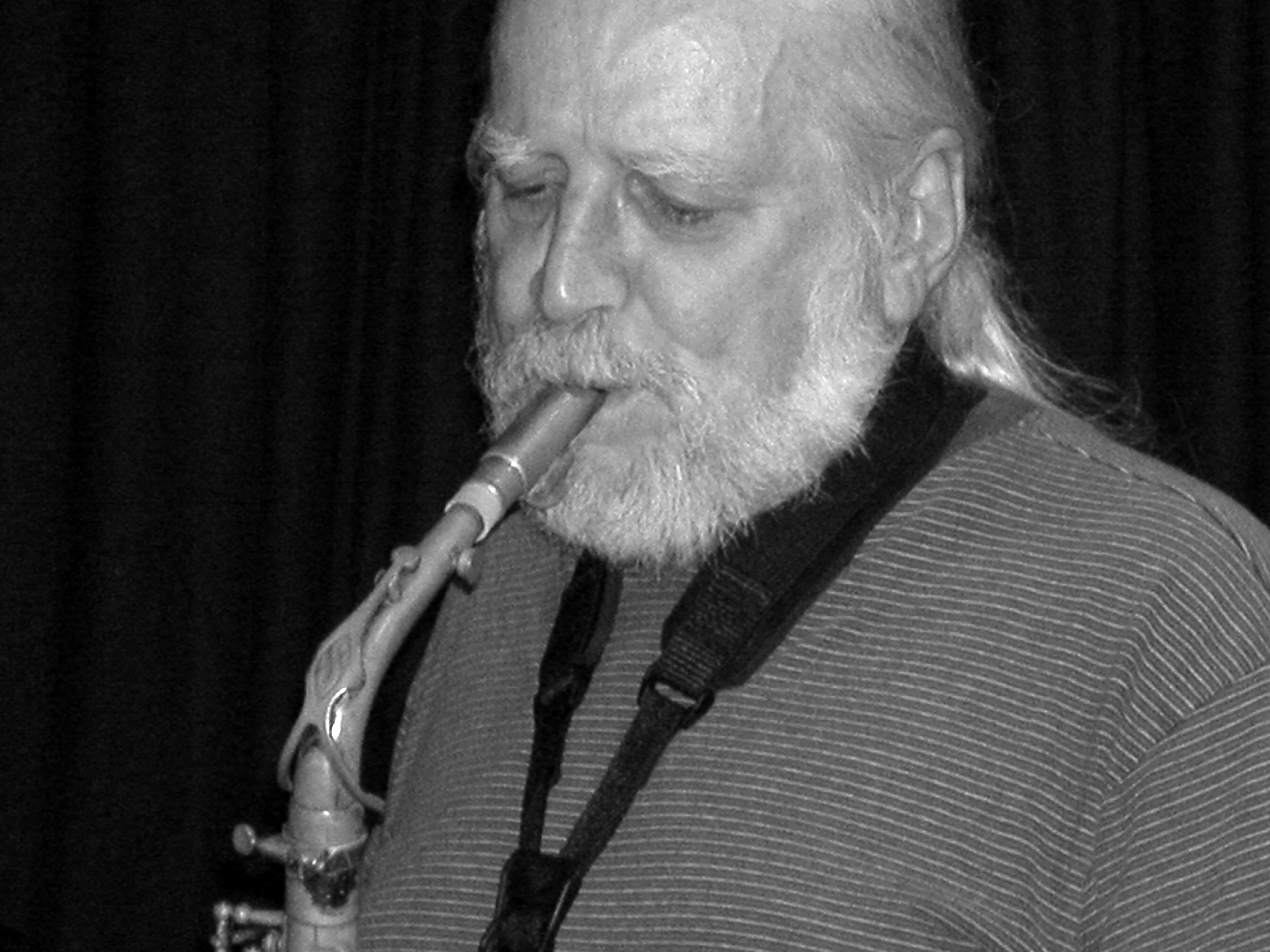
- In concert with the Nu Band, Club W71, Weikersheim, Germany

Background information
- Genres: Jazz
- Occupation: Musician
- Instrument: Saxophone
- Years active: 1980–?
- Label: CIMP

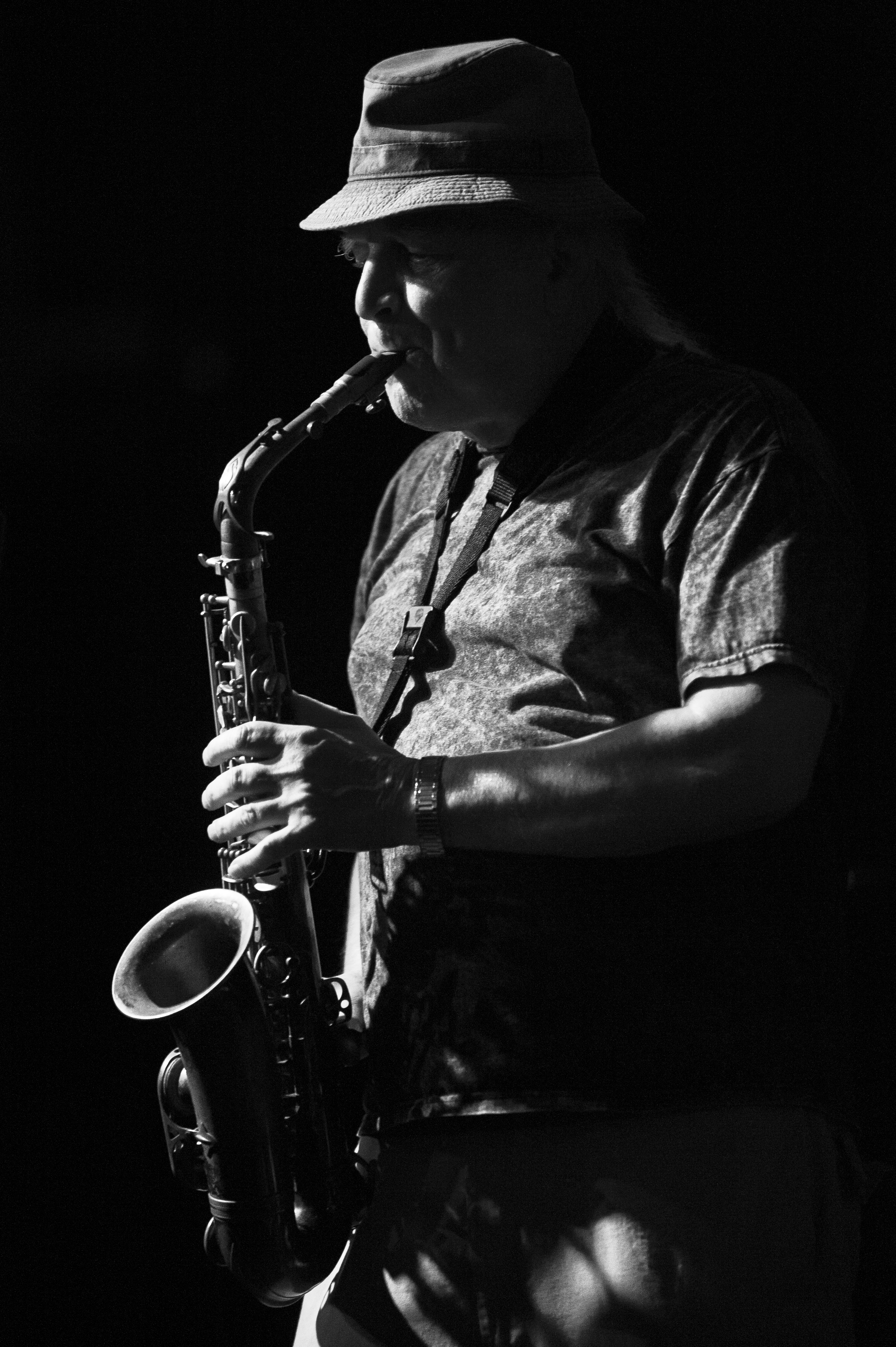
Mark Whitecage, Vision XIII Festival

Mark Whitecage (June 4, 1937 – March 7, 2021) was an American jazz reedist.

== Career ==
Whitecage played in his father's family ensemble as early as age six. In the 1980s, he played with Gunter Hampel's Galaxy Dream Band, Jeanne Lee, and Saheb Sarbib. After touring solo in Europe in 1986, he put together two bands as a leader, Liquid Time and the Glass House Ensemble. In the 1990s, his first release with Liquid Time was chosen by Cadence Magazine as one of the year's best albums. He worked in the Improvisers Collective from 1994, and began releasing albums on CIMP in 1996. Late in the 1990s he worked with Anthony Braxton, including in performances of Braxton's opera, Trillium R. He also played with William Parker, Perry Robinson, Joe Fonda, Dominic Duval, Joe McPhee, Steve Swell, Richie "Shakin'" Nagan and Sikiru Adepoju.

He was married to clarinetist Rozanne Levine; they performed together with Perry Robinson in a trio called Crystal Clarinets.

== Discography ==
=== As leader ===
- Mark Whitecage & Liquid Time (Acoustics, 1990)
- Caged No More (CIMP, 1996)
- Free for Once (CIMP, 1996)
- 3 + 4 = 5 (CIMP, 1998)
- Consensual Tension (CIMP, 1998)
- Split Personality (GM, 1998)
- Research On the Edge (CIMP, 1999)
- Fractured Again (Acoustics, 2000)
- Fractured Standards & Fairy Tales (Acoustics, 2000)
- Fragments of a Dream (Acoustics, 2000)
- Moon Blue Boogie (Acoustics, 2000)
- Turning Point (Acoustics, 2000)
- The Paper Trail (Acoustics, 2001)
- Ducks On Acid (Acoustics, 2003)
- BushWacked (Acoustics, 2005)

=== As sideman ===
With Dominic Duval

- State of the Art (CIMP, 1997)
- Live in Concert (Cadence, 1999)
- Cries and Whispers (Cadence, 2001)
- No Respect (Acoustics, 2002)
- Rules of Engagement Vol. 1 (Drimala, 2003)

With Joe Fonda & Michael Jefry Stevens

- The Wish (Music & Arts, 1995)
- Parallel Lines (Music & Arts, 1997)
- Live from Brugge (W.E.R.F., 1997)
- Evolution (Leo, 1998)

With Gunter Hampel

- Angel (Birth, 1972)
- Broadway/Folksong (Birth, 1972)
- I Love Being with You (Birth, 1972)
- Unity Dance (Birth, 1973)
- Journey to the Song Within (Birth, 1974)
- Out from Under (Birth, 1974)
- Enfant Terrible (Birth, 1975)
- All Is Real (Birth, 1978)
- That Came Down On Me (Birth, 1978)
- All the Things You Could Be If Charles Mingus Was Your Daddy (Birth, 1980)
- Fresh Heat (Birth, 1985)
- Celestial Glory (Birth, 1992)

With INTERface

- INTERface NY (Composers Collective, 1976)
- Live at Environ (ReEntry, 1977)
- This Time (ReEntry, 1978)
- Glimpses (ReEntry, 1979)
- Environ Days (Konnex, 1991)

With the Nu Band

- Live at the Bop Shop/Rochester NY (Clean Feed, 2001)
- Live in Geneva (Not Two, 2017)
- Live in Paris (NoBusiness, 2010)
- Live (Konnex, 2005)
- Lower East Side Blues (Porter, 2008)
- Relentlessness (Marge, 2011)
- The Cosmological Constant (Not Two, 2015)
- The Dope and the Ghost (Not Two, 2007)
- The Final Concert (NoBusiness, 2016)

With Saheb Sarbib

- Aisha (Cadence, 1981)
- Live at the Public Theater (Cadence, 1981)
- UFO Live On Tour (Cadence, 1981)
- Seasons (Soul Note, 1982)
- Jancin' at Jazzmania (Jazzmania, 1985)

With others

- Marshall Allen, Mark–n–Marshall: Monday (CIMP, 1998)
- Marshall Allen, Mark–n–Marshall: Tuesday (CIMP, 1998)
- Anthony Braxton, Trillium R (Braxton House, 1999)
- Anthony Braxton, Six Standards (Quintet) 1996 (Splasc(H), 2004)
- Jacques Coursil, Trails of Tears (Sunnyside, 2010)
- David Eyges, The Captain (Chiaroscuro, 1977)
- John Fischer, 6 x 1 = 10 Duos for a New Decade (ReEntry, 1980)
- Jeanne Lee, Conspiracy (Earthforms, 1975)
- Jeanne Lee, Natural Affinities (Owl, 1992)
- Joe McPhee, Mark Whitecage, Paul Smoker, CIMPhonia 1998 Part 1 (CIMP, 1998)
- Joe McPhee, Mark Whitecage, Paul Smoker, CIMPhonia 1998 Part 2 (CIMP, 1999)
- Bobby Naughton, Understanding (Otic, 1972)
- Mario Pavone, Digit (Alacra, 1979)
- Mario Pavone, Sharpeville (Alacra, 1988)
- Annette Peacock, Revenge (Polydor, 1971)
- Annette Peacock, I'm the One (Ironic, 1986)
- Jay Rosen, Canticles for the New Millennium (CIMP, 2000)
- Michael Jefry Stevens, Elements (Leo, 1996)
- Michael Jefry Stevens, Short Stories (Red Toucan, 1998)
- Steve Swell, Moons of Jupiter (CIMP, 1997)
