= The Watermelon Suite =

Studio album by Trio X
- Released: 1999
- Recorded: May 26 & 27, 1998 at The Spirit Room in Rossie, New York.
- Genre: Jazz
- Length: 72:56
- Label: CIMP CIMP 183
- Producer: Robert D. Rusch

Joe McPhee chronology
Chicago Tenor Duets (2002)	The Watermelon Suite (1999)	Zebulon (1998)

The Watermelon Suite is an album performed by multi-instrumentalist Joe McPhee's Trio X recorded in 1998 and first released on the CIMP label.

== Reception ==
Professional ratings
Review scores
Source	Rating
Allmusic	3/5 stars
The Penguin Guide to Jazz Recordings	3/4 stars

Allmusic reviewer Steve Loewy states "The mood is generally more pensive than to be expected, although fires are lit in a few of the pieces. McPhee shows himself to be a thoughtful, sensitive player, where every note counts and space is just as important... The results are somewhat mixed, though McPhee and Duval fans should find moments of inspiration".

== Track listing ==
All compositions by Joe McPhee, Dominic Duval and Jay Rosen except as indicated

1. "Points" - 7:21
2. "The Watermelon Suite Part 1: The Whole" (Duval, McPhee) - 4:41
3. "The Watermelon Suite Part 2: The Rind" (Duval, McPhee) - 3:11
4. "The Watermelon Suite Part 3: The Meat" (Duval, McPhee) 7:39
5. "The Watermelon Suite Part 4: The Seeds" (Duval, McPhee) - 2:28
6. "Wecotdo Part 1" - 5:50
7. "Wecotdo Part 2" - 3:36
8. "Soundboard Safari" (Duval, Rosen) - 4:47
9. "Solero" - 6:09
10. "A Ballad in Their Own Way" - 6:08
11. "Putter Piece" - 11:26
12. "My Funny Valentine" (Lorenz Hart, Richard Rodgers) - 9:40

== Personnel ==
- Joe McPhee - soprano saxophone (tracks 1–7 & 9–12)
- Dominic Duval - bass
- Jay Rosen - drums, percussion
