= Rapture (Trio X album) =

Live album

Live album by Trio X
- Released: 1999
- Recorded: December 28, 1998
- Venue: Knitting Factory (New York City)
- Genre: Jazz
- Length: 61:59
- Label: Cadence Jazz CJR 1106
- Producer: Bob Rusch and Dominic Duval

Joe McPhee chronology
The Dream Book (1998)	Rapture (1999)	In the Spirit (1999)

Rapture is a live album by multi-instrumentalist Joe McPhee's Trio X featuring bassist Dominic Duval, percussionist Jay Rosen along with guest violinist Rosi Hertlein recorded at the Knitting Factory in late 1998 and released on the Cadence Jazz label.

== Reception ==
Professional ratings
Review scores
Source	Rating
Allmusic	4.5/5 stars
The Penguin Guide to Jazz Recordings	3/4 stars

Allmusic reviewer Steve Loewy states "the group's highlight is clearly the lengthy (more than 47 minutes) "Lift Every Voice and Sing," the lovely spiritual by James Weldon Johnson. The piece slowly unfolds, revealing solo and group improvisations of major substance and incredible beauty, not to mention virtuosity". On All About Jazz Derek Taylor wrote "This disc is easily recommended to both long time McPhee fans and neophytes interested in learning what all the excitement surrounding the man is really about".

== Track listing ==
All compositions by Joe McPhee, Domenic Duval and Jay Rosen except as indicated

1. "Elegy: Upon Mourning" - 1:25
2. "Lift Every Voice and Sing" (James Weldon Johnson, J. Rosamond Johnson) - 47:56
3. "Rapture" - 12:38

== Personnel ==
- Joe McPhee - saxophone
- Dominic Duval - bass, electronics
- Jay Rosen - drums, percussion
- Rosi Hertlein - violin, voice
