= PoZest =

Studio album by Marshall Allen with Lou Grassi's PoBand
- Released: 2000
- Recorded: May 10 and 11, 1999
- Studio: The Spirit Room, Rossie, New York
- Genre: Free jazz
- Label: CIMP; 207
- Producer: Robert D. Rusch

Marshall Allen chronology
Mark–n–Marshall: Tuesday (1998)	PoZest (2000)	The All-Star Game (2003)

PoZest is an album by saxophonist Marshall Allen. It was recorded at The Spirit Room in Rossie, New York on May 10 and 11, 1999, and was released in 2000 by CIMP. On the album, Allen is joined by Lou Grassi's PoBand, featuring Perry Robinson (clarinet), Paul Smoker (trumpet), Steve Swell (trombone), Wilber Morris (bass), and Grassi (drums).

== Reception ==
Professional ratings
Review scores
Source	Rating
AllMusic	4/5 stars
The Penguin Guide to Jazz	3/4 stars
All About Jazz	3.5/5 stars

In a review for AllMusic, David Dupont wrote: "This session very much belongs to the ensemble as a whole, with the honored guest taking his place within the ensemble."

The authors of The Penguin Guide to Jazz Recordings stated that Allen blends with the "dry, slightly academic sound" of the PoBand "rather well," and commented: "On '(Midnight) Blues', the horn-lines are trenchant but contemplative. 'Bird Symphony' and 'LouRa' are different kinds of ensemble piece, the former a sprawling, intense thing, the latter more upbeat and affirmative. Allen isn't a showy or conventionally expressive soloist, but he commands."

Glenn Astarita, writing for All About Jazz, called the album "a slightly boisterous yet heartfelt convergence of acute musical minds at work," and remarked that on "Bird Symphony," "Allen's raspy phrasing on alto sax amid Grassi and Morris' rolling and tumbling rhythms provide a solid forum for engaging group dialogue and brisk interplay."

One Final Note's Scott Hreha wrote: "there's not much fault to find here. An excellent document of a multifaceted ensemble, PoZest enters another quality notch in Allen's extra-Arkestral discography and captures a pivotal moment of development for Grassi's primary musical outlet."

John Murph of Jazz Times singled out "(Midnight) Blues" for praise, commenting: "It's here that you can really hear beauty in the individual voices, and more importantly, free jazz's collective improvisation linkage to Dixieland." However, he stated: "The rest of the album, however, returns to generic ecstatic-jazz antics that sadly argue against its own artistic significance."

== Track listing ==
No.	Title	Songwriters	Length
1.	"Bird Symphony"	Marshall Allen, Lou Grassi, Perry Robinson, Paul Smoker, Steve Swell, Wilber Morris	32:52
2.	"(Midnight) Blues"	Marshall Allen, Lou Grassi, Perry Robinson, Paul Smoker, Steve Swell, Wilber Morris	14:42
3.	"Soft Winds"	Marshall Allen, Lou Grassi, Perry Robinson, Paul Smoker, Steve Swell, Wilber Morris	10:24
4.	"LouRa"	Paul Smoker	11:35
Total length:			69:33

== Personnel ==
- Marshall Allen – alto saxophone
- Lou Grassi – drums
- Perry Robinson – clarinet, whistle
- Paul Smoker – trumpet
- Steve Swell – trombone
- Wilber Morris – bass
