= The Sugar Hill Suite =

Studio album by Trio X
- Released: 2004
- Recorded: October 19, 2004 at The Spirit Room in Rossie, New York.
- Genre: Jazz
- Label: CIMP (CIMP 320)
- Producer: Bob Rusch

Joe McPhee chronology
In Finland (2004)	The Sugar Hill Suite (2004)	Moods: Playing with the Elements (2005)

The Sugar Hill Suite is a studio album performed by multi-instrumentalist Joe McPhee's Trio X recorded in 2004 and first released on the CIMP label.

== Reception ==
Professional ratings
Review scores
Source	Rating
The Penguin Guide to Jazz Recordings	3.5/4 stars

In JazzTimes Marc Masters wrote "The Sugar Hill Suite alternates between slow meditations and swinging vamps. The opening "For Agusta Savage" is mournful, as McPhee traces an Ornette Coleman-ish tenor sax pattern. Later, "Triple Play" and "Monk's Waltz" are catchy yet reflective, at times even serene. This affinity for combining the somber with the upbeat peaks on the stunning 16-minute title track". On All About Jazz Kurt Gottschalk said "There's plenty of payoff in The Sugar Hill Suite, an oddly plaintive dedication to the spirit of Harlem. Far from the jazz-renaissance throwback that might be expected, it is luxuriously languid".

== Track listing ==
All compositions by Joe McPhee, Dominic Duval and Jay Rosen

1. "For Agusta Savage" - 5:26
2. "Triple Play" - 8:08
3. "Sometimes I Feel Like a Motherless Child" (Traditional) - 7:15
4. "Drop Me Off in Harlem" (Duke Ellington) - 6:53
5. "The Sugar Hill Suite" - 16:51
6. "Little Sunflower" - 11:32
7. "Monk's Waltz" - 4:43
8. "Goin' Home" - 6:55

== Personnel ==
- Joe McPhee - tenor saxophone
- Dominic Duval - bass
- Jay Rosen - drums
