= Moons of Jupiter (album) =

Studio album by Steve Swell
- Released: 1997
- Recorded: May 22 & 23, 1997
- Studio: The Spirit Room, Rossie, New York
- Genre: Jazz
- Length: 59:18
- Label: CIMP
- Producer: Bob Rusch

Steve Swell chronology
Out and About (1996)	Moons of Jupiter (1997)	Atmospheels (1999)

Moons of Jupiter is an album by the American jazz trombonist Steve Swell, recorded in 1997 and released on CIMP. He leads a quartet with Mark Whitecage on reeds, Dominic Duval on bass, and Jay Rosen on drums.

== Reception ==
Professional ratings
Review scores
Source	Rating
The Penguin Guide to Jazz	3/4 stars

The Penguin Guide to Jazz notes that: "Moons of Jupiter gets a tumultuous start with the overwhelmingly powerful 'For Henry Darger'. The rest of the record turns out as a free-bop date with flashes of brilliance."

The JazzTimes review by John Murph states that "Swell boasts an intriguing set that keenly balances the hemispheres of the free and structured."

== Track listing ==
All compositions by Steve Swell

1. "For Henry Darger" - 12:03
2. "Callisto" - 4:31
3. "The I Refuse Blues" - 7:33
4. "Io" - 1:33
5. "Moons of Jupiter" - 10:31
6. "Europa" - 2:45
7. "The Human Touch" - 9:39
8. "Ganymede" - 2:43
9. "(be) Conversational" - 8:02

== Personnel ==
- Steve Swell - trombone
- Mark Whitecage - alto sax, alto clarinet
- Dominic Duval - bass
- Jay Rosen - drums
