= Mark–n–Marshall: Monday =

Studio album by Marshall Allen Quartet Featuring Mark Whitecage
- Released: 1998
- Recorded: March 16, 1998
- Studio: The Spirit Room, Rossie, New York
- Genre: Free jazz
- Label: CIMP; 171
- Producer: Robert D. Rusch

Marshall Allen chronology
Mark–n–Marshall: Monday (1998)	Mark–n–Marshall: Tuesday (1998)

Mark–n–Marshall: Monday is an album by saxophonist Marshall Allen, his first as a leader. It was recorded at The Spirit Room in Rossie, New York on March 16, 1998, and was released later that year by CIMP. On the album, which is the companion to Mark–n–Marshall: Tuesday, Allen is joined by saxophonist and clarinetist Mark Whitecage, bassist Dominic Duval, and drummer Luqman Ali.

== Reception ==
Professional ratings
Review scores
Source	Rating
AllMusic	3/5 stars
The Penguin Guide to Jazz	3/4 stars

In a review for AllMusic, Steve Loewy wrote: "It is hard to believe that this is the first release under the name of alto saxophonist Marshall Allen, who was 73 years old when this CD was recorded... with players so good, most everything manages to fall into line... There is a somewhat informal, and even self-indulgent feeling throughout, but that is forgivable, given the high level of musicianship."

The authors of The Penguin Guide to Jazz Recordings stated: "'When You Wish Upon a Star' is an obvious echo of Sun Ra's Disney fascination, but there is also the coda-like 'Star Wishing' to demonstrate how much further Allen is prepared to push things. 'Out of Nowhere' is a titanic performance, while 'Fly Me to the Moon' ensures that the interplanetary strain hasn't been overlooked."

A reviewer for All About Jazz commented: "This Monday date is full of the sound of joy... Whitecage provides mobile flutterings that perfectly complement Allen's Johnny Hodges-meets-Ornette Coleman tone. Dominic Duval provides bass commentary in the revolutionary mode of Scott LaFaro and Gary Peacock... Luqman Ali... supports the group with crisp, propulsive drumming. Who says Mondays are all bad?"

== Track listing ==
No.	Title	Songwriters	Length
1.	"Mr. Whitecage, Meet Mr. Allen"	Dominic Duval, Luqman Ali, Mark Whitecage, Marshall Allen	9:47
2.	"Out of Nowhere"	Dominic Duval, Luqman Ali, Mark Whitecage, Marshall Allen	12:18
3.	"When You Wish Upon a Star"	Leigh Harline, Ned Washington	8:30
4.	"Star Wishing"	Marshall Allen	7:38
5.	"Fly Me to the Moon"	Bart Howard	10:52
6.	"Albatross"	Dominic Duval, Luqman Ali, Mark Whitecage, Marshall Allen	10:54
7.	"Seven and Half Steps"	Dominic Duval, Luqman Ali, Mark Whitecage, Marshall Allen	9:01
Total length:			69:00

== Personnel ==
- Marshall Allen – alto saxophone
- Mark Whitecage – clarinet, alto saxophone, soprano saxophone
- Dominic Duval – double bass
- Luqman Ali – drums
