= Zebulon (album) =

Studio album by Michael Bisio and Joe McPhee
- Released: 1999
- Recorded: July 6 & 7, 1998
- Studio: The Spirit Room in Rossie, New York
- Genre: Jazz
- Label: CIMP CIMP 179
- Producer: Robert D. Rusch

Joe McPhee chronology
The Watermelon Suite (1998)	Zebulon (1999)	The Dream Book (1998)

Professional ratings
Review scores
Source	Rating
AllMusic	4.5/5 stars

Zebulon is an album performed by bassist Michael Bisio and multi-instrumentalist Joe McPhee recorded in 1998 and first released on the CIMP label.

== Track listing ==
All compositions by Joe McPhee and Michael Bisio

1. "Makeover Makeover" - 13:13
2. "Kind of a Ballad" - 8:56
3. "Duosalbosity 2" - 3:56
4. "Something Different" - 14:25
5. "Gracie's Amazing" - 17:18
6. "Undulation" - 6:43
7. "Denis & Charles" - 3:55

== Personnel ==
- Joe McPhee - tenor saxophone, alto saxophone
- Michael Bisio - bass
