= Atmospheels =

Studio album by Steve Swell
- Released: 1999
- Recorded: August 3 & 4, 1998
- Studio: The Spirit Room, Rossie, New York
- Genre: Jazz
- Length: 72:51
- Label: CIMP
- Producer: Bob Rusch

Steve Swell chronology
Moons of Jupiter (1997)	Atmospheels (1999)	Flurries Warm and Clear (1999)

Atmospheels is an album by American jazz trombonist Steve Swell, which was recorded in 1998 and released on CIMP. He leads a trio with Will Connell on reeds and Lou Grassi on drums. They first played together on Grassi's PoBand. This was Connell's first recording in eighteen years.

== Reception ==
Professional ratings
Review scores
Source	Rating
AllMusic	4.5/5 stars
The Penguin Guide to Jazz	3/4 stars

In his review for AllMusic, Steve Loewy states "This is Swell's strongest statement as a leader, as the trombonist brashly swaggers across the court, his big-toned bell belting out rough-edged sounds of joyous tunefulness."

The Penguin Guide to Jazz notes that "With no bassist, Grassi seems unsire of how to make the music go forward, and it tends to clump around his bass-drum pedal. That said, there are still some corking improvisations from the leader, such as his long, blaring take on 'Folk Tune'."

== Track listing ==
All compositions by Steve Swell except as indicated

1. "Labor's Daze" - 8:04
2. "Folk Tune" - 12:29
3. "Cosmo Crater" - 6:07
4. "Saved As One" - 8:23
5. "BA-1" - 11:30
6. "Let's Go Right Ahead" (Swell/Connell/Grassi) - 5:58
7. "Atmospheel - Stage 2" - 9:41
8. "Soul Traveler Con Fuego" (Swell/Connell/Grassi) - 10:39

== Personnel ==
- Steve Swell - trombone
- Will Connell - alto sax, clarinet, bass clarinet
- Lou Grassi - drums, percussion
