= On Tour (Trio X album) =

Live album by Trio X
- Released: 2001
- Recorded: March 24, 2001 at the Bug Jar in Rochester, New York and March 24, 2001 at St. George The Martyr Church, in Toronto, Canada
- Genre: Jazz
- Length: 73:45
- Label: Cadence Jazz CJR 1134
- Producer: Bob Rusch

Joe McPhee chronology
Mister Peabody Goes to Baltimore (2000)	On Tour (2001)	In Black and White (1999-2001)

On Tour (subtitled Toronto/Rochester) is a live album by multi-instrumentalist Joe McPhee's Trio X featuring bassist Dominic Duval and percussionist Jay Rosen recorded in 2001 and released on the Cadence Jazz label.

== Reception ==
Professional ratings
Review scores
Source	Rating
Allmusic	4.5/5 stars
The Penguin Guide to Jazz Recordings	3/4 stars

Allmusic reviewer Steve Loewy called it a "powerful live recording" and states "With the caliber of musicians comprising the trio, it is not surprising that there is a consistently high quality to these unusual interpretations, which, for the most part, merely hint at recognizable melodies... The three performers easily sustain interest for each of the lengthy tracks (the longest being nearly 22 minutes) without repeating themselves or running out of ideas. Pure joy". On All About Jazz John Sharpe said "it is an intriguing blend of the lyrical, whether composed or extemporised, and the abstract".

== Track listing ==
1. "Monkin' Around (Blue Monk)" (Thelonious Monk) - 16:09
2. "Try a Little Tenderness" (Jimmy Campbell, Reg Connelly, Harry Woods) - 13:06
3. "My Funny Valentine" (Lorenz Hart, Richard Rodgers) - 13:39
4. "Trail of Tears (For Jim Pepper)" [Referencing "Send in the Clowns" (Stephen Sondheim)] - 21:52
5. "Old Eyes" (Joe McPhee) - 8:59

== Personnel ==
- Joe McPhee - tenor saxophone, pocket trumpet
- Dominic Duval - bass
- Jay Rosen - drums
