= Mark–n–Marshall: Tuesday =

Studio album by Marshall Allen Quartet Featuring Mark Whitecage
- Released: 1998
- Recorded: March 16 and 17, 1998
- Studio: The Spirit Room, Rossie, New York
- Genre: Free jazz
- Label: CIMP; 180
- Producer: Robert D. Rusch

Marshall Allen chronology
Mark–n–Marshall: Monday (1998)	Mark–n–Marshall: Tuesday (1998)	PoZest (2000)

Mark–n–Marshall: Tuesday is an album by saxophonist Marshall Allen, his second as a leader. It was recorded at The Spirit Room in Rossie, New York on March 16 and 17, 1998, and was released later that year by CIMP. On the album, which is the companion to Mark–n–Marshall: Monday, Allen is joined by saxophonist and clarinetist Mark Whitecage, bassist Dominic Duval, and drummer Luqman Ali.

== Reception ==
Professional ratings
Review scores
Source	Rating
AllMusic	4/5 stars
The Penguin Guide to Jazz	3/4 stars

The authors of The Penguin Guide to Jazz Recordings stated that, in relation to Mark–n–Marshall: Monday, Tuesday "is just as good, but one senses that, the introductions over, the chemistry isn't quite as intense." However, they noted: "'Altobatics' is as close to a showpiece as Allen has released, and 'My Funny Valentine' will challenge any blindfold testee."

John Murph, writing for Jazz Times, wrote: "In... Whitecage, Allen has found a kindred spirit, one who can dance around and intersect through Allen's oblique passages... Bassist Dominic Duval and drummer Luqman Ali provide a supple rhythm section that gently pushes Allen and Whitecage forward while simultaneously adding rich colors and textures... Mark–n–Marshall: Tuesday... softly piques the curiosities of those wanting to hear this great altoist outside of Sun Ra's outer-spaceways."

== Track listing ==
No.	Title	Songwriters	Length
1.	"Yesterday's Flowers"	Dominic Duval, Luqman Ali, Mark Whitecage, Marshall Allen	8:38
2.	"Well, You Needn't"	Thelonious Monk	8:42
3.	"Opus Springtime"	Sun Ra	5:54
4.	"Something About J.C."	Mark Whitecage	6:45
5.	"Duval Calling"	Dominic Duval, Luqman Ali, Mark Whitecage, Marshall Allen	7:41
6.	"East of South"	Dominic Duval, Luqman Ali, Mark Whitecage, Marshall Allen	9:49
7.	"My Funny Valentine"	Richard Rodgers, Lorenz Hart	9:43
8.	"Altobatics"	Dominic Duval, Luqman Ali, Mark Whitecage, Marshall Allen	5:07
Total length:			62:19

== Personnel ==
- Marshall Allen – alto saxophone
- Mark Whitecage – clarinet, alto saxophone
- Dominic Duval – double bass
- Luqman Ali – drums
