= Roulette at Location One =

Live album by Trio X
- Released: 2005
- Recorded: March 4, 2005
- Venue: Roulette at the Location One Gallery, NYC
- Genre: Jazz
- Length: 63:21
- Label: Cadence Jazz CJR 1200
- Producer: Bob Rusch and Joe McPhee

Joe McPhee chronology
Moods: Playing with the Elements (2004)	Roulette at Location One (2005)	Guts (2005)

Roulette at Location One is a live studio album by multi-instrumentalist Joe McPhee's Trio X featuring bassist Dominic Duval and percussionist Jay Rosen. It was recorded in Brooklyn in 2005 and released on the Cadence Jazz label.

== Reception ==
On All About Jazz, Marc Medwin said "Trio X continues its increasingly longstanding tradition of meditative fire music with this stridently contemplative March 2006 live date. Not so much a series of pieces as a collective meditation on Black music and its history, the album is a palimpsest, bringing together various eras and styles in front of an enthusiastic audience. ...the disc is another triumph for the group, maybe one of the most interesting and enjoyable statements in its growing catalogue". In JazzTimes, Scott Verrastro wrote "Roulette at Location One exhibits Trio X in peak form, opting for spatial exploration by utilizing remarkable restraint and extraordinary dynamics".

== Track listing ==
1. "Funny Valentines of War" – 15:09
2. "Improvs and Melodies of Themes" – 17:24
3. "David Danced: Variations on Ellington" – 9:41
4. "Sunflower Musings" – 13:21
5. "Going Home" – 7:46

== Personnel ==
- Joe McPhee – soprano saxophone, pocket trumpet
- Dominic Duval – bass
- Jay Rosen – drums
