= Moons of Jupiter (disambiguation) =

The Moons of Jupiter may refer to:

- Moons of Jupiter, the natural satellites of the planet Jupiter
  - Galilean moons, the four largest moons and first discovered of Jupiter, by Galileo
  - Rings of Jupiter
- Jupiter's moons in fiction
  - The Moons of Jupiter (book), a 1982 book by Alice Munro, an anthology containing the eponymous short story
  - "The Moons of Jupiter" (short story), a 1981 story by Alice Munro
  - Lucky Starr and the Moons of Jupiter, a 1957 novel by Isaac Asimov in the Lucky Starr novel series
- Moons of Jupiter (album), 1997 jazz album by Steve Swell
- Moons of Jupiter, 1998 album by Scruffy The Cat

== See also ==
- Jupiter Moon, a 1990 British science fiction soap opera television series
- Jupiter's Moon, a 2017 film
