= Voices & Dreams =

Live album by Raymond Boni and Joe McPhee
- Released: 2001
- Recorded: May 5, 2000 at Horlieu in Lyon and May 9 & 10, 2000 at Parenthèses in Marseilles.
- Genre: Jazz
- Length: 67:32
- Label: Emouvance émv 1016
- Producer: Françoise Bastianelli

Joe McPhee chronology
Port of Saints (2000)	Voices & Dreams (2001)	Mister Peabody Goes to Baltimore (2000)

Voices & Dreams is a live album by guitarist Raymond Boni and multi-instrumentalist Joe McPhee recorded in France in 2000 and first released on the French Emouvance label.

== Reception ==
Professional ratings
Review scores
Source	Rating
Allmusic	3/5 stars

Allmusic reviewer François Couture states "Recommended, especially to those who prefer their free jazz tempered".

== Track listing ==
All compositions by Joe McPhee

1. "Voices I" - 7:12
2. "Dream I" - 10:00
3. "Voices II" - 12:28
4. "Dream II" - 6:47
5. "Voices III" - 11:10
6. "Dream III" - 8:20
7. "Voices IV" - 11:03

== Personnel ==
- Joe McPhee - tenor saxophone, alto saxophone, pocket trumpet
- Raymond Boni - electric guitar
