= Port of Saints (album) =

Live album by Joe McPhee, Raymond Boni, Michael Bisio and Dominic Duval
- Released: 2006
- Recorded: May 8, 2000
- Venue: Chapelle Sainte Philomène, Puget-Ville, France
- Genre: Jazz
- Length: 63:31
- Label: CjR CjR-6
- Producer: Craig Johnson and Joe McPhee

Joe McPhee chronology
In the Spirit (1999)	Port of Saints (2006)	Voices & Dreams (2000)

Port of Saints is a live album of performed by multi-instrumentalist Joe McPhee recorded in 2000 in France and first released on the CjR label.

== Reception ==
Professional ratings
Review scores
Source	Rating
All About Jazz	4.5/5 stars

On All About Jazz, Lyn Horton wrote "Port of Saints describes an epic journey whose main character is the saxophone. A guitar acts as the saxophone's alter ego. Two basses supply avuncular guide posts for traveling to an unknowable but certain destination. The journey is rife both with fantasy and human spirit".

== Track listing ==
All compositions by Joe McPhee, Raymond Boni, Michael Bisio and Dominic Duval.

1. "Port of Saints" – 51:00
2. "The Snake, the Fish (and Things)" – 13:52

== Personnel ==
- Joe McPhee – tenor saxophone
- Raymond Boni – electric guitar
- Michael Bisio, Dominic Duval – bass
