= In the Spirit (Joe McPhee album) =

Studio album by Joe McPhee Bluette
- Released: 1999
- Recorded: March 17–18, 1999
- Studio: The Spirit Room in Rossie, New York.
- Genre: Jazz
- Length: 63:31
- Label: CIMP CIMP 199
- Producer: Robert D. Rusch

Joe McPhee chronology
The Dream Book (1998)	In the Spirit (1999)	No Greater Love (1999)

In the Spirit is an album of spirituals performed by multi-instrumentalist Joe McPhee's Bluette, recorded in 1999 and released on the CIMP label.

== Reception ==
Professional ratings
Review scores
Source	Rating
AllMusic	4.5/5 stars
The Penguin Guide to Jazz Recordings	3.5/4 stars

AllMusic reviewer Steve Loewy states: "An important contribution to the discography of the spiritual, McPhee gives it a new perspective, but one that is entirely respectful of the tradition. Performed gracefully and tastefully, the group tastes free form without losing sight of the melodies". On All About Jazz, Derek Taylor wrote: "In a career stamped by a continuous string of transcendent recordings this is one of McPhee's best to date, a vital testament that lovingly embraces the indelible tradition of spirituals and expertly applies them to the setting of creative improvisation". In JazzTimes, Harvey Pekar suggested: "Maybe one more extroverted track would have helped the CD, which sometimes gets too subdued, but it's a fine effort nevertheless".

== Track listing ==
1. "Deep River" (Traditional) – 9:32
2. "People Get Ready" (Curtis Mayfield) – 12:01
3. "God Bless the Child" (Billie Holiday, Arthur Herzog, Jr.) – 11:44
4. "Birmingham Sunday/Come Sunday" (Joe McPhee/Duke Ellington) – 14:19
5. "Astral Spirits" (Joe McPhee) – 8:32
6. "Just a Closer Walk With Thee" (Traditional) – 7:23

== Personnel ==
- Joe McPhee – tenor saxophone, soprano saxophone
- Joe Giardullo – flute, bass clarinet, clarinet, soprano saxophone
- Michael Bisio, Dominic Duval – bass
