= No Greater Love (album) =

2000 jazz studio album

Studio album by Joe McPhee, Joe Giardullo, Michael Bisio and Dominic Duval
- Released: 2000
- Recorded: March 17–18, 1999
- Studio: The Spirit Room in Rossie, New York.
- Genre: Jazz
- Length: 63:31
- Label: CIMP CIMP 209
- Producer: Robert D. Rusch

Joe McPhee chronology
In the Spirit (1999)	No Greater Love (2000)	Emancipation Proclamation: A Real Statement of Freedom (1999)

No Greater Love is a live album of performed by multi-instrumentalist Joe McPhee recorded in 1999 and first released on the CIMP label. The album was recorded at the same sessions that produced In the Spirit.

== Reception ==
Professional ratings
Review scores
Source	Rating
AllMusic	4/5 stars
The Penguin Guide to Jazz Recordings	3/4 stars

AllMusic reviewer Steve Loewy states: "While the volume and intensity are toned down a notch from that of some other McPhee excursions, the quality of music is never less than superb". On All About Jazz, Derek Taylor wrote: "Those folks who have already imbibed the intoxicating sounds of In the Spirit will definitely want to check out this second round from the well. Listeners who haven't yet heard either are strongly advised to acquire both and set aside a secluded pair of hours free from worldly distractions to drink this glorious music in".JazzTimes noted the album's "generally uplifting though often contemplative moods".

== Track listing ==
1. "Deep River" (Traditional) – 3:26
2. "Deep Sheep" (Dominic Duval, Joe McPhee) – 5:43
3. "Nancy" (Joe Giardullo) – 5:59
4. "No Greater Love" (Isham Jones, Marty Symes) – 6:20
5. "Strangers in a Strange Land" (McPhee) – 11:34
6. "Ferocious Beauty" (Giardullo) – 7:57
7. "Deep Sleep" (Duval, Michael Bisio) – 11:01
8. "Get That Name" (Duval, Giardullo, McPhee, Bisio) – 2:47
9. "We Just Think It" (Giardullo, McPhee) – 1:55

== Personnel ==
- Joe McPhee – soprano saxophone
- Joe Giardullo – bass clarinet, soprano saxophone
- Michael Bisio, Dominic Duval – bass
