= In Finland =

Live album by Joe McPhee, Matthew Shipp and Dominic Duval
- Released: 2005
- Recorded: July 24, 2004
- Venue: Raahe-Sali in Raahe, Finland.
- Genre: Jazz
- Length: 72:57
- Label: Cadence Jazz (CJR 1186)
- Producer: Bob Rusch

Joe McPhee chronology
Everything Happens for a Reason (2003)	In Finland (2005)	The Sugar Hill Suite (2004)

Matthew Shipp chronology
Harmony and Abyss (2004)	In Finland (2004)	One (2005)

In Finland is a live studio album by multi-instrumentalist Joe McPhee, pianist Matthew Shipp and bassist Dominic Duval recorded in 2004 and released on the Cadence Jazz label.

== Reception ==
Professional ratings
Review scores
Source	Rating
Allmusic	4.5/5 stars
All About Jazz	4.5/5 stars
The Penguin Guide to Jazz Recordings	4/4 stars

Allmusic reviewer Steve Loewy states "By the end of this full-length recording, the listener has participated in a journey that applies new perspectives to common themes, challenges traditional concepts, and soars toward a paradigm of order and structure that emerges from a morass of free improvisation -- a magnificent feat that sparkles majestically". On All About Jazz Rex Butters wrote "These three musicians blend their distinctive voices to unite in the interwoven wonder of improvised performance. Maintaining a compelling dynamism throughout, In Finland captures a valuable musical moment and brings an updated look at Matthew Shipp for some thirsty ears". In JazzTimes Mike Shanley noted "Ultimately, the touchstones are noticeable but they're outweighed by the music that McPhee, Shipp and Duval create in the moment.

== Track listing ==
All compositions by Joe McPhee, Matthew Shipp and Domenic Duval.

1. "Never Before" – 32:43
2. "Never Again" – 25:29
3. "In Finland" – 14:45

== Personnel ==
- Joe McPhee – soprano saxophone, pocket trumpet
- Matthew Shipp – piano
- Dominic Duval – bass
