= Cries and Whispers (disambiguation) =

Cries and Whispers is a 1972 Swedish film.

Cries and Whispers may also refer to:

- Cries and Whispers (album), a live album by Dominic Duval
- "Cries and Whispers" (New Order song), a B-side to "Everything's Gone Green", 1981
- "Cries and Whispers" (Devious Maids), a 2015 television episode
