= Paul Smoker =

American jazz musician

Paul Alva Smoker (May 8, 1941 – May 14, 2016) was an American composer and jazz trumpeter.

== Music career ==
Smoker was born in Muncie, Indiana, grew up in Davenport, Iowa, and moved to Chicago to play professionally. He worked there in the 1960s, playing with Bobby Christian among others. He took his doctorate at the University of Iowa in 1974, and taught at Coe College from 1976 to 1990, as well as for shorter periods at the University of Iowa, the University of Northern Iowa, and the University of Wisconsin–Oshkosh.

In the 1980s and 1990s, Smoker worked with musicians such as Anthony Braxton, Gregg Bendian, Damon Short, Randy McKean, and Phil Haynes. He was a member of Joint Venture, who recorded for Enja Records in the late 1980s and early 1990s. His records issued on CIMP in the 1990s feature sidemen such as Vinny Golia, Ken Filiano, and Steve Salerno.

Outside of jazz, Smoker was also involved in the performance of contemporary classical music, in his university capacities and with the SOMA ensemble. He worked out of upstate New York from 1990.

He died on May 14, 2016, in Pittsford, New York, at the age of 75.

== Discography ==
=== As leader ===
- Mississippi River Rat (Sound Aspects, 1984)
- Alone (Sound Aspects, 1986)
- Come Rain or Come Shine (Sound Aspects, 1986)
- Genuine Fables (Hathut, 1988)
- Halloween '96 (CIMP, 1996)
- Standard Deviation (CIMP, 1998)
- Large Music, Vol. 1 (CIMP, 2000)
- Large Music, Vol. 2 (CIMP, 2001)
- Mirabile Dictu (CIMP, 2001)
- Brass Reality (Nine Winds, 2002)
- Duocity in Brass & Wood (Cadence, 2003)
- Halloween, the Sequel (Nine Winds)

=== As sideman ===
With Marshall Allen

- PoZest (CIMP, 2000)

With Anthony Braxton

- Ensemble (Victoriaville) 1988 (Victo, 1988 [1992])
- Nine Compositions (Hill) 2000 (CIMP, 2001)
