= The Dream Book =

Live album by Joe McPhee and Dominic Duval
- Released: 1999
- Recorded: August 27, 1998
- Venue: Knitting Factory, NYC.
- Genre: Jazz
- Length: 59:57
- Label: Cadence Jazz CJR 1105
- Producer: Bob Rusch

Joe McPhee chronology
Zebulon (1998)	The Dream Book (1999)	Rapture (1998)

The Dream Book is a live album by multi-instrumentalist Joe McPhee and bassist Dominic Duval recorded at the Knitting Factory in 1999 and released on the Cadence Jazz label.

== Reception ==
Professional ratings
Review scores
Source	Rating
Allmusic	4.5/5 stars
The Penguin Guide to Jazz Recordings	4/4 stars

Allmusic reviewer Steve Loewy states "With total command of their instruments, and endless ideas, the duo produces expectantly stunning results. Wondrous and evocative".

== Track listing ==
All compositions by Joe McPhee and Domenic Duval except where noted.

1. "Dance of the Reasons Why" – 18:53
2. "Beyond the Truth-Lies" – 8:17
3. "Moffett's Motif" – 6:39
4. "Old Eyes" (Joe McPhee) – 5:28
5. "Caught in the Moment" – 10:14
6. "And Then Red" – 4:54
7. "Celebration" – 2:00

== Personnel ==
- Joe McPhee – alto saxophone, pocket trumpet
- Dominic Duval – bass
