= The Last Dance (Dominic Duval and Cecil Taylor album) =

Live album by Dominic Duval and Cecil Taylor
- Released: 2009
- Recorded: October 30, 2003
- Venue: San Francisco Jazz Festival, San Francisco, CA
- Genre: Free jazz
- Label: Cadence Jazz Records; CJR 1229, CJR 1230

Cecil Taylor chronology
Being Astral and All Registers – Power of Two (2020)	The Last Dance (2009)	Ailanthus/Altissima: Bilateral Dimensions of 2 Root Songs (2009)

The Last Dance is a live album by bassist Dominic Duval and pianist Cecil Taylor recorded during the San Francisco Jazz Festival on October 30, 2003. It was released in 2009 by Cadence Jazz Records in two volumes.

== Reception ==
Writing for The Village Voice, Francis Davis called the album "one of the great pianist's most totemic recorded works," and commented: "the pleasure here is vicariously tactile — you feel those extended runs of Taylor's (they gather momentum and then stop short, like waves cresting without splashing the shore) throughout your entire body, starting in your fingers. As if conceding no ground to Duval, he positions himself in the bass clef for much of the performance, and his attack is so brutal that during the few moments of silence, you can still hear the piano's wood vibrating. Faced with irrelevance in the wake of Taylor's one-man call-and-response, Duval... shifts resourcefully between selfless accompaniment and head-on encounter — his role is to provide Taylor with a canvas, and he does, artfully."

In a review for Point of Departure, Ed Hazell wrote: "No pianist has as many ways to touch a piano as Taylor, every nerve twitch in his fingers seems directly wired into an expressive intent. A fortissimo cluster of notes can hit as hard as a blacksmith hammer, only to be followed by a pianissimo caress. The abrupt contrasts are so extreme that they still have the power to startle. He's also paying closer attention to the decay of his notes than in other recordings, letting tones linger and the colors slowly fade. At times it's a melancholy effect and the music often has a tragic grace... Duval... is finely attuned to Taylor's mercurial ways. The additional space in the music gives him places to fill in, to add embellishments and commentary... there is a real sense of give and take between Duval and Taylor... More often than not, Taylor is piloting the improvisation in the direction he wants, but Duval is a willing passenger and not altogether subservient, either. Their chemistry is one of this album's many pleasures."

== Track listing ==
=== Disc 1 ===
1. "Untitled" – 1:07:36

=== Disc 2 ===
1. "Bridge Works" – 18:34
2. "Fortuitous Madness" – 4:37
3. "Solo Piano" – 1:52

== Personnel ==
- Cecil Taylor – piano, voice
- Dominic Duval – bass (tracks 1–3)
