= Dominic Duval =

American jazz bassist

- Born: April 27, 1945; New York City, U.S.
- Died: July 22, 2016 (aged 71)
- Genres: Jazz; free jazz; modern classical
- Occupation: Musician
- Instrument: Double bass
- Years active: 1960s–2000s
- Formerly of: C.T. String Quartet, "The Wedding Band", Trio X, Dominic Duval String Ensemble

Dominic Duval (April 27, 1945 – July 22, 2016) was an American classical and free jazz bassist.

== Biography ==
Duval was born in New York City. His father Dominic Duval Sr. was a bassist.

At Eastman School of Music, Duval double majored in Classical Performance and Jazz and Contemporary Media from 2007 to 2011. There, he served as Principal Bassist of the Eastman Philharmonia Orchestra. Duval studied further with bassists Jeff Campbell, Larry Grenadier, Orlando le Fleming, Homer Mensch, François Rabbath, and James Van Demark.

Duval died on July 22, 2016.

== Music career ==
Since the 1990s, Duval was for the most part active on the New York City jazz scene. He did not begin recording regularly until the 1990s, but since then had appeared on a very large number of albums, particularly on the labels CIMP, Cadence Jazz, and Leo Records. As a result, Duval was described by Allmusic as "unquestionably ... one of the most-recorded free jazz bassists on the planet". Todd Jenkins describes Duval and drummer Jay Rosen as the "house rhythm section" for CIMP, given the number of recordings on which they have jointly appeared. Duval's freedom of expression was paramount in his playing. Duval played his Hutchings bass more often like a violin, guitar, or lead saxophone. He displayed fast lines and rich textures. Seldom did he play the bass in a traditional, low-pitch rhythmic role. Instead, he freely interacted with other members within the ensemble.

Duval has recorded alongside many musicians, including Marc Copland, Andrew Cyrille, Gilad Hekselman, Fred Hersch, Dick Hyman, Vic Juris, Dave Kikoski, Lee Konitz, Victor Lewis, Francisco Mela, Luis Perdomo, Rudy Royston, Colin Stranahan, Glenn Zaleski, and with the Cecil Taylor trio. In addition, he has led or co-led ensembles, such as the C.T. String Quartet, "The Wedding Band", Trio X, and the Dominic Duval String Ensemble.

Duval has toured in the United States, Europe, Canada, and Asia.

== Awards and honors ==
Duval's album Night Bird Inventions, a solo bass CD recorded in 1997, was selected in the Top 10 by the Coda Magazine critics poll; his State of the Art, a string ensemble CD, was selected by a Jazziz Magazine poll as one of 1997's top jazz albums.

== Discography ==
=== As leader or co-leader ===
- The Wedding Band (CIMP, 1997)
- State of the Art (CIMP, 1997)
- Nightbird Inventions (Cadence, 1997)
- Live in Concert (Cadence, 1998)
- The Navigator (Leo, 1998)
- Equinox (Leo, 1999)
- Working with the Elements with Glenn Spearman (CIMP, 1999)
- Under the Pyramid (Leo, 2000)
- The Experiment (Blue Jackel, 2000)
- Undersound (Leo, 2000)
- Asylum (Leo, 2001)
- Cries and Whispers (Cadence, 1999 [2001])
- American Scrapbook (CIMP, 2002)
- Undersound II (Leo, 2003)
- No Respect (Acoustics, 2003)
- Rules of Engagement Vol. I (Drimala, 2003)
- Coming From Us (Quixotic, 2004)
- Rules of Engagement Vol. II (Drimala, 2004)
- Monkinus (CIMP, 2006)
- Mountain Air (CIMP, 2006)
- Nowhere to Hide (NotTwo, 2008)
- The Spirit of Things (CIMP, 2008)
- For the Children (Cadence, 2008)
- The Last Dance Volumes 1 and 2 (Cadence, 2009) - with Cecil Taylor
- Monk Dreams (NoBusiness, 2009)
- Magic (NotTwo, 2010)
- Park West Suite (Cadence, 2011)

=== As sideman ===
With Marshall Allen

- Mark–n–Marshall: Monday (CIMP, 1998)
- Mark–n–Marshall: Tuesday (CIMP, 1998)

With Paul Lytton

- The Balance of Trade (CIMP, 1996)

With Joe McPhee

- The Watermelon Suite (CIMP, 1998 [1999]) as Trio X
- The Dream Book (Cadence, 1998 [1999])
- Rapture (Cadence, 1999) as Trio X
- In the Spirit (CIMP, 1999)
- No Greater Love (CIMP, 1999 [2000])
- Port of Saints (CjR, 2000 [2006])
- Angels, Devils & Haints (CjR, 2000 [2009])
- On Tour (Cadence Jazz, 2001) as Trio X
- In Black and White (Cadence, 2002) as Trio X
- Journey (CIMP, 2003) as Trio X
- The Sugar Hill Suite (CIMP, 2004) as Trio X
- In Finland (Cadence Jazz, 2004 [2005]) with Matthew Shipp
- Moods: Playing with the Elements (CIMP, 2005) as Trio X
- Roulette at Location One (Cadence Jazz, 2005) as Trio X
- Air: Above and Beyond (CIMPol, 2006) as Trio X
- 2006 U.S. Tour (CIMPol, 2007) as Trio X
- Live in Vilnius (NoBusiness, 2008) as Trio X
- Live On Tour 2008 (CIMPol, 2010) as Trio X
- Live On Tour 2010 (CIMPol, 2012) as Trio X

With the Glenn Spearman–John Heward Group

- Th (CIMP, 1997)

With Steve Swell

- Moons of Jupiter (CIMP, 1997)
