= Guts (McPhee, Brötzmann, Kessler, and Zerang album) =

Live album by Joe McPhee, Peter Brötzmann, Kent Kessler and Michael Zerang
- Released: 2007
- Recorded: August 3, 2005
- Studio: the Empty Bottle in Chicago
- Genre: Jazz
- Length: 58:57
- Label: Okka Disc OD12062
- Producer: Bruno Johnson and Peter Brötzmann

Joe McPhee chronology
Roulette at Location One (2005)	Guts (2007)	The Open Door (2005)

Peter Brötzmann chronology
No Hard Feelings: For Steve Lacy (2005)	Guts (2005)	Full Blast (2006)

Guts is an album by Joe McPhee, Peter Brötzmann, Kent Kessler and Michael Zerang recorded in 2005 and released on the Okka Disc label in 2007.

== Reception ==
Professional ratings
Review scores
Source	Rating
Allmusic	4/5 stars
All About Jazz	5/5 stars

Allmusic reviewer Phil Freeman states "While the group is capable of Ayler-esque blare, the two horn players (McPhee switches back and forth between saxophones and trumpet or cornet) can also bring things down quite a bit, murmuring introspective phrases with the rhythm section at rest. This happens during each of the two long pieces that make up Guts, and it helps give the listener's ears a momentary break, but also builds tension for when the full ensemble comes back".

== Track listing ==
All compositions by Joe McPhee, Peter Brötzmann, Kent Kessler and Michael Zerang.

1. "Guts" – 17:41
2. "Rising Spirits" – 41:16

== Personnel ==
- Peter Brötzmann – alto saxophone, tenor saxophone, clarinet, tárogató
- Joe McPhee – alto saxophone, tenor saxophone, trumpet
- Kent Kessler – bass
- Michael Zerang – drums
