= Phil Haynes =

American jazz percussionist and composer (born 1961)

Phil Haynes (born 1961 in Hillsboro, Oregon) is an American jazz percussionist and composer.

== Career ==
A veteran artist based in New York for 25 years, Phil Haynes has appeared on more than 85 LPs, CDs, and DVDs across various American and European record labels. Haynes’ recording debut came on the 1984 album QB by The Paul Smoker Trio featuring Anthony Braxton, which critic Kevin Whitehead named the top jazz album of 1985. Throughout this career, international media have drawn comparisons between Haynes' drumming style and that of Jack DeJohnette, Roy Haynes, and Elvin Jones, while noting compositional influences ranging from Duke Ellington and Charles Ives to Charles Mingus and the Art Ensemble of Chicago. In a review for The Free Jazz Collective, critic Stef Gijssels characterized Haynes' work as striking “the perfect middle between tradition and avant-garde, between power and sophistication, between accessibility and adventure. . . standards with a new sense of drama, dynamics, and true moments of fun.”

In addition to the critically acclaimed three recordings for Enja Records by the composer’s collective, "Joint Venture" (w/Paul Smoker, Ellery Eskelin, + Drew Gress), His recordings as a leader include: "Continuum" (violinist Mark Feldman’s jazz debut); the "4 Horns & What?"; his first recording of jazz, "A Couch in Brooklyn" (featuring Israeli born pianist Micu Narununsky and bassist Drew Gress); "The Hammond Insurgency" with organist virtuoso Jeff Palmer; "Free Country’s" trilogy of Americana (w/ cellist/vocalist Hank Roberts & guitarist Jim Yanda); a solo drum-set recording, "Sanctuary," as well as "No Fast Food," his saxophone trio featuring NEA jazz master David Liebman.

Moving to central Pennsylvania in 2003, Haynes founded the nationally noted Jazz@Bucknell chamber series, in 2005, and was subsequently appointed as Bucknell University’s first Kushell Jazz Artist-in-Residence. From 2007-2012, Haynes taught courses in Jazz History, directed his multi-media/new music Bucknell Interdisciplinary Improvisation Ensemble (BIIE), coached the University Jazz Band rhythm section and soloists, worked with various small ensembles and recitalists, maintained a vigorous private studio, and led the 'Bison Band. Later years featured appointments as interim Director of Jazz Studies for both Susquehanna University, PA, and Nazareth College, NY.

Haynes has performed and recorded with a variety of musicians and artists.

In addition to his "Sanctuary" solo concert presentations + duet performances with David Liebman and Herb Robertson, current Haynes touring ensembles include his: romantic, folk-Americana string band, 'Free Country' (featuring cellist/vocalist Hank Roberts, guitarist Jim Yanda, + bassist Drew Gress); the modernist saxophone trio, 'No Fast Food' (w/bass titan Drew Gress and NEA jazz master David Liebman); as well as the classic piano trio, 'Day Dream' (w/pianist Steve Rudolph & Drew Gress).

== Discography ==
=== As leader ===
- "Continuum: the Passing" (Owl, 1991)
- "4 Horns & What?" (Open Minds, 1991)
- "4 Horn Lore" (Open Minds, 1992)
- "Ritual" duets w/ Herb Robertson (CIMP, 2000)
- "Free Country" the eponymous debut (Premonition, 2000)
- "Brooklyn-Berlin" quintet led w/ Herb Robertson (CIMP, 2000)
- "The Way the West Was Won" by Free Country (CornerStoreJazz, 2010)
- "Sanctuary" for solo drum set (CornerStoreJazz, 2013)
- "It Might Be Spring" duets w/ Paul Smoker (Alvas/CornerStoreJazz, 2013)
- "Together / Workin' It" by No Fast Food (CornerStoreJazz, 2014)
- "'60 / '69: My Favorite Things" by Free Country (CornerStoreJazz, 2018)
- "Settings for Three" by No Fast Food (CornerStoreJazz, 2018)
- "Live at the Brooklyn Academy of Music" by 4 Horns & What? (CornerStoreJazz, 2023)

With Joint Venture

- Joint Venture (Enja, 1987)
- Ways (Enja, 1990)
- Mirrors (Enja, 1993)

=== As sideman ===
With Paul Smoker

- QB (Alvas, 1984)
- Mississippi River Rat (Sound Aspects, 1985)
- Alone (Sound Aspects, 1988)
- Come Rain or Come Shine (Sound Aspects, 1989)
- Genuine Fables (Hat ART, 1993)
- Halloween '96 (CIMP, 1997)
- Halloween the Sequel (Nine Winds, 1998)
- Brass Reality (Nine Winds, 2002)
- Cool Lives (Alvas, 2012)
- Landings (Alvas, 2013)

With Gebhard Ullmann

- Trad Corrosion (Nabel, 1995)
- Basement Research (Soul Note, 1995)
- Kreuzberg Park East (Soul Note, 2000)
- Live in Munster (Not Two, 2007)

With others

- Mark Dresser, Force Green (Soul Note, 1995)
- Drew Gress & Steve Rudolph, "Day Dream" (PACT,
- Ellery Eskelin, Setting the Standard (Cadence, 1989)
- Ellery Eskelin, Forms (Open Minds, 1991)
- Andy Laster, Hippo Stomp (Sound Aspects, 1989)
- Andy Laster, Twirler (Sound Aspects, 1990)
- Herb Robertson, Certified (JMT, 1991)
- Herb Robertson, Ritual (CIMP, 2000)
- Steve Rudolph, "Day Dream" (PACT, 2009)
- Steve Rudolph, "Originals" (PACT, 2019)
- Dave Taylor, Past Tells (New World, 1993)
- Jake Wark, "Tremors" (CornerStoreJazz, 2016)
- Tom Varner, Long Night Big Day (New World, 1991)
- Jim Yanda, "Regional Cookin'" (CornerStoreJazz, 2013
- Jim Yanda, "Home Road" (CornerStoreJazz, 2016)
- Jim Yanda, "A Silent Way" (CornerStoreJazz, 2020)
