= Specific Gravity (album) =

Live album by Joe McPhee and Joe Giardullo
- Released: 2001
- Recorded: September 27, 1997, at WPKN in Bridgeport, Connecticut
- Genre: Jazz
- Length: 53:05
- Label: Boxholder BHX021

Joe McPhee chronology
Finger Wigglers (1996)	Specific Gravity (2001)	The Brass City (1997)

Specific Gravity is a live album by the multi-instrumentalists Joe McPhee and Joe Giardullo, recorded in 1997 and first released on the Boxholder label.

== Reception ==
Professional ratings
Review scores
Source	Rating
AllMusic	2.5/5 stars
The Penguin Guide to Jazz Recordings	3/4 stars

AllMusic reviewer, David R. Adler, wrote, "Even the most experienced listeners may not be able to discern what's at stake here theoretically, but in any case, there's much to recommend in this meeting of two highly advanced minds." On All About Jazz, the writer Glenn Astarita wrote, "The force of magnetism between these two master musicians is prominently displayed on this fine outing. Recommended" while Derek Taylor observed, "The art of the duo is a sphere necessarily reserved improvisers able to negotiate its myriad challenges. Giardullo and McPhee prove themselves in possession of such mettle, but those listeners familiar with either player are unlikely to require any such convincing." In JazzTimes, Aaron Steinberg wrote, "The two men work slowly and deliberately, each giving the other the utmost space, focusing on nuance in interval and texture. The recording peaks on the starkly beautiful, delicate rendition of Coltrane's 'After the Rain'."

== Track listing ==
All compositions by Joe Giardullo and Joe McPhee except as indicated

1. "A Priori"- 28:09
2. "Specific Gravity" (Joe McPhee) - 5:39
3. "After the Rain" (John Coltrane) - 10:53
4. "Sienna " - 6:42

== Personnel ==
- Joe McPhee - alto clarinet, soprano saxophone, valve trombone, electronics
- Joe Giardullo - C Flute, bass clarinet, soprano saxophone, electronics
