= Gebhard Ullmann =

German jazz musician and composer (born 1957)

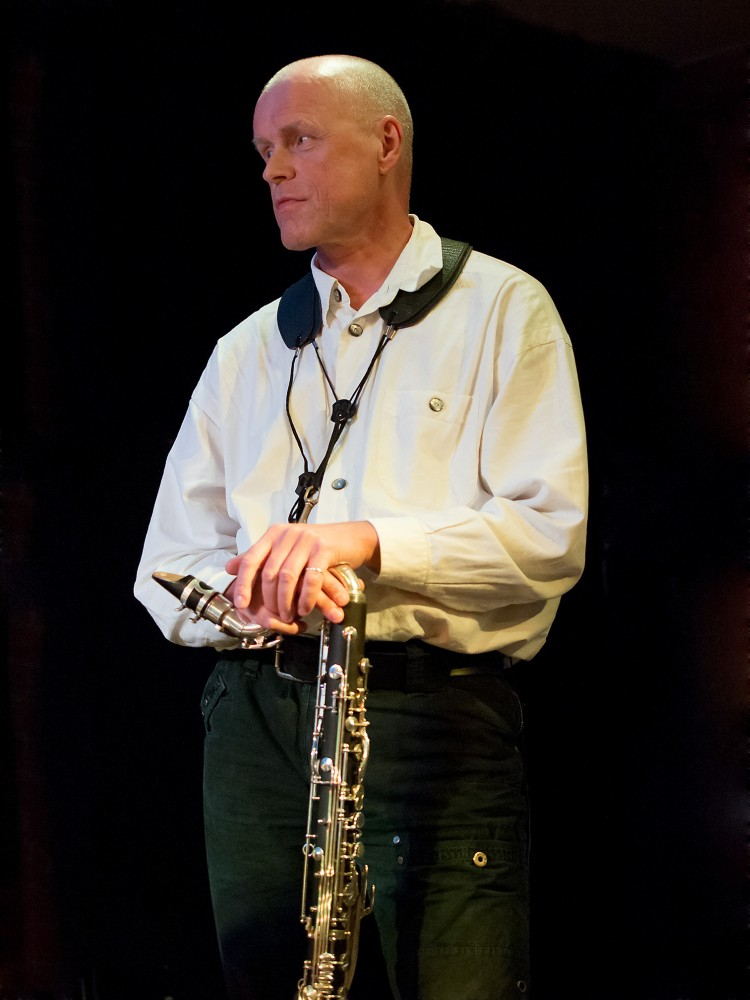
- Ullmann at Jazz Club Unterfahrt, Munich 2013

Background information
- Born: November 2, 1957 (age 68); Germany
- Genres: Jazz
- Occupation: Musician
- Instruments: Saxophone, flutes, bass clarinet
- Website: www.gebhard-ullmann.com

Gebhard Ullmann (born November 2, 1957) is a German jazz musician and composer.

== Career ==
At the age of six, Ullmann started to play the recorder and later classical flute. Since 1976 he studied a.o. with Herb Geller and Dave Liebman and at the University of Hamburg flute and saxophone. He also studied medicine from 1976–1982. During this time he worked with guitarist Andreas Willers and a trio with keyboards and vocals.

Since 1983 he has been living in Berlin, although he lived in both Berlin and New York City from 1999 to 2011. With Willers he started the quartet Out To Lunch in 1983 (later with Enrico Rava), the project Minimal Kidds (with Niko Schäuble, Trilok Gurtu, Glen Moore) and different trios with Steve Argüelles, Marvin Smitty Smith and Phil Haynes.

In 1991 he began his project Tá Lam (up to ten woodwinds plus accordion) that toured worldwide and released 4 CDs that made it to the top-of-the-year lists in many magazines all over the world including a five star review by John Ephland in Down Beat. 1993 Soul Note founder Giovanni Bonandrini invited him to start his project Basement Research in NYC. Originally a quartet with Ellery Eskelin (later Tony Malaby), Drew Gress and Phil Haynes, later it became a quintet with Steve Swell, Julian Argüelles, John Hebert (later Pascal Niggenkemper) and Gerald Cleaver and released seven CDs.

Some of the other projects Ullmann led or co-led and composed music for are:

- The Berlin-based Clarinet Trio (with Jürgen Kupke, Michael Thieke)
- the transatlantic quartet Conference Call (with Michael Jefry Stevens, Joe Fonda, Matt Wilson, later Han Bennink and George Schuller)
- the trio BassX3 (with bassists Chris Dahlgren and Clayton Thomas plus Ullmann on bassflute and bassclarinet)
- his co-lead projects with Steve Swell The Ullmann/Swell 4 (with Hill Greene and Barry Altschul) and The Chicago Plan (with Fred Lonberg-Holm and Michael Zerang)
- the French/German Double Trio de Clarinets (the Clarinet Trio plus Jean-Marc Foltz, Sylvain Kassap and Armand Angster)
- the Berlin-based sextet GULF of Berlin
- the duo with vocalist Almut Kühne
- the electro-acoustic trio Das Kondensat (with Oli Potratz and Eric Schaefer)
- Hemisphere 4, an ongoing project with harpist Anna Viechtl, keyboardist Liz Kosack, accordionist Silke Lange and vibraphonist Taiko Saito.
- In 2019 he released the first CD with the worldwide first quartertone-piano-quartet‚ mikroPULS‘. The NYC Jazz Record wrote: "Ullmann has put out more than his share of great albums but the more one hears mikroPULS, it sounds like one of his best."

Gebhard Ullmann also works as a composer and wrote music for different chamber music ensembles including three string quartets and several solo pieces for woodwind instruments, violin, piano.
He also wrote several larger works for classical orchestra and a new score for the movie 'Berliner Stilleben' from 1929 by László Moholy-Nagy for the BuJazzO plus Choir as part of the project 'Klingende Utopien - 100 Jahre Bauhaus'.
In 2021 he wrote his first symphony entitled 'Symphonische Verwebungen for Orchestra, Voice, Piano and Percussion' and together with composer Udo Agnesens the 25-minute work 'Tá Lam' based on his cycle from the early 1990s.
Currently he is working on a cycle of compositions entitled 'Modules for Orchestra' with No. 1-7 being finished.
His 61-minute work 'Impromptus und Interationen' was released in 2024 by the Viennese label Kairos_(record_label).
The String Quartet No.1 was released 2025 by Challenge Records (1994) in the Netherlands.
All of his compositions are distributed by Universal Edition, Vienna.

In 2024 Ullmann released his 70th CD as a leader or co-leader. As a sideman he works in the orchestras of Japanese pianist Satoko Fujii, German pianist Hannes Zerbe and drummer Günter Sommer . He was a member of projects such as The Silent Jazz Ensemble, Chris Dahlgren's Lexicon, the Berlin-based Die Elefanten (produced by Teo Macero), Günter Lenz’s Springtime, the Scott DuBois Quartet and many others.

He has also worked with Paul Bley, Keith Tippett, Frank Gratkowski, Ernst-Ludwig Petrowsky, the Ensemble Les Percussions de Guinée, William Parker, Herb Robertson, Bob Moses, Bobby Previte, Lauren Newton, Andrew Cyrille, Sylvie Courvoisier, Willem Breuker, Rita Marcotulli, Dieter Glawischnig, Tom Rainey, Ivo Papazov, Sergei Starostin, Alexey Kruglov, Beñat Achiary, Frank Möbus, Tyshawn Sorey and the actor Otto Sander.

== Awards ==
Ullmann received the Julius Hemphill Composition Award (1999) in two categories, one of the first SWR Jazz Awards (together with Andreas Willers in 1987), The German Phonoacademy Award (1983), many awards by the city of Berlin including the first Berlin Jazz Award in 2017. The second CD of his Tá Lam project was nominated best CD of the year by the German Schallplattenkritik and many of his CDs made the best-of-the-year list in magazines and newspapers worldwide including the New York City Jazz Record and the Down Beat magazine (The Clarinet Trio 1999, Final Answer 2002, The Bigband Project 2004, New Basement Research 2006, Poetry in Motion 2008, News? No News 2010, Tá Lam 11 – Mingus! 2011, Hat And Shoes 2015, Impromptus and Other Short Works 2019, Das Kondensat 2 2021). The CD Transatlantic received the Choc of the French Jazz Magazine. Since 2005 Ullmann was listed in the Down Beat critics poll, lately in several categories. In 2022 he received the German Jazz Award in the category woodwinds.

== Discography ==
=== Leader or co-leader albums ===
- Gebhard Ullmann, Andreas Willers Playful (Biber, 1985)
- Gebhard Ullmann, Andreas Willers, Hans-Dieter Lorenz, Nikolaus Schäuble Out to Lunch (Nabel, 1985)
- Minimal Kidds No Age (Intuition, 1987, with Andreas Willers, Nikolaus Schäuble, Trilok Gurtu, Glen Moore, Burhan Öçal, Hans Lüdemann)
- Gebhard Ullmann, Enrico Rava, Andreas Willers, Martin Lillich, Nikolaus Schäuble (Nabel, 1989)
- Per-Dee-Doo (Nabel, 1990; - Gebhard Ullmann, Michael Rodach, Martin Lillich, Nikolaus Schäuble)
- Gebhard Ullmann, Andreas Willers Suite Noire with Marvin Smitty Smith, Bob Stewart (Nabel, 1992)
- Gebhard Ullmann, Andreas Willers Playful '93 (Nabel, 1993)
- Gebhard Ullmann, Hans Hassler Tá Lam (99 Records, 1993)
- Tá Lam 8 Moritat (99 Records, 1994 - Gebhard Ullmann, Dirk Engelhardt, Hans Hassler, Heiner Reinhardt, Jürgen Kupke, Joachim Litty, Thomas Klemm, Volker Schlott)
- Gebhard Ullmann, Ellery Eskelin, Drew Gress, Phil Haynes Basement Research (Soul Note, 1995)
- Gebhard Ullmann, Andreas Willers, Phil Haynes Trad Corrosion (Nabel, 1997)
- Kreuzberg Park East (Soul Note, 1999 - Gebhard Ullmann, Ellery Eskelin, Drew Gress, Phil Haynes)
- Gebhard Ullmann, Jürgen Kupke, Michael Thieke Oct 1, '98 (Leo Records, 1999)
- Tá Lam Zehn Vancouver Concert (Leo Records, 2000- Gebhard Ullmann, Hinrich Beermann, Daniel Erdmann, Hans Hassler, Thomas Klemm, Jürgen Kupke, Joachim Litty, Theo Nabicht, Heiner Reinhardt, Volker Schlott)
- Essencia featuring Carlos Bica (Between the Lines, 2001; with Jens Thomas)
- Clarinet Trio Translucent Tones (Leo Records, 2002- Gebhard Ullmann, Jürgen Kupke, Michael Thieke)
- Conference Call Final Answer (Soul Note, 2002; with Michael Jefry Stevens, Joe Fonda, Matt Wilson)
- Conference Call Variations on a Master Plan (Leo Records, 2003; with Michael Jefry Stevens, Joe Fonda, Han Bennink)
- Conference Call Spirals. The Berlin Concert (482 Music, 2004; with Michael Jefry Stevens, Joe Fonda, George Schuller)
- Steve Swell, Gebhard Ullmann, Hilliard Greene, Barry Altschul Desert Songs and Other Landscapes (CIMP, 2004)
- The Clarinet Trio Ballads and Related Objects (Leo Records, 2004)
- The Big Band Project (Soul Note, 2004, with Claus Stötter, Ingolf Burkhardt, Michael Leuschner, Reiner Winterschladen, Ingo Lahme, Joe Gallardo, Sebastian Hoffmann, Sebastian John, Stefan Lottermann, Peter Bolte, Fiete Felsch, Lutz Büchner, Julian Argüelles, Christof Lauer, Frank Delle, Vladislav Sendecki, Stephan Diez, Lucas Lindholm, Tom Rainey, Marcio Doctor, Dieter Glawischnig)
- Gebhard Ullmann, Chris Dahlgren, Peter Herbert BassX3 (Drimala, 2005)
- Gebhard Ullmann, Chris Dahlgren, Art Lande Die blaue Nixe (Between the Lines, 2006)
- Gebhard Ullmann, Chris Dahlgren, Jay Rosen CutItOut (Leo Records, 2006)
- Gebhard Ullmann & Basement Research Live in Münster (NotTwo Records, 2006)
- Conference Call Live at the Outpost Performance Space (482 Music, 2006; rec. 2003 - Gebhard Ullmann, Michael Jefry Stevens, Joe Fonda, Gerry Hemingway)
- The Clarinet Trio Leo Records 25th Anniversary (Leo Records, 2007)
- Gebhard Ullmann, Steve Swell, Julian Argüelles, John Hebert, Gerald Cleaver New Basement Research (Soul Note, 2007)
- Conference Call Poetry in Motion (Clean Feed, 2008 - Gebhard Ullmann, Michael Jefry Stevens, Joe Fonda, George Schuller)
- Gebhard Ullmann Basement Research Don't Touch My Music Vol 1 & 2 (NotTwo Records, 2009)
- Steve Swell, Gebhard Ullmann, Hilliard Greene, Barry Altschul News? No News! (Jazzwerkstatt, 2010)
- Conference Call What About ...? (NotTwo Records, 2010 - Gebhard Ullmann, Michael Jefry Stevens, Joe Fonda, George Schuller)
- Steve Swell, Gebhard Ullmann, Hilliard Greene, Barry Altschul Live in Montreal (CIMPol, 2010)
- Tá Lam 11 Mingus! (Jazzwerkstatt, 2011 - Gebhard Ullmann, Benjamin Weidekamp, Daniel Erdmann, Hans Hassler, Heiner Reinhardt, Hinrich Beermann, Jürgen Kupke, Michael Thieke, Vladimir Karparov, Volker Schlott)
- The Clarinet Trio: 4 (Leo Records, 2012 - Gebhard Ullmann, Jürgen Kupke, Michael Thieke)
- BassX3: Transatlantic (Leo Records, 2012 - Gebhard Ullmann, Chris Dahlgren, Clayton Thomas)
- The Double Trio de Clarinets: Itinéraire bis (Between the Lines, 2013 - Jean-Marc Foltz, Sylvain Kassap, Armand Angster, Gebhard Ullmann, Jürgen Kupke, Michael Thieke)
- Conference Call. Seven. Live at the Firehouse (NotTwo Records, 2014 - Gebhard Ullmann, Michael Jefry Stevens, Joe Fonda, George Schuller)
- Gebhard Ullmann, Daniel Erdmann, Johannes Fink, Christian Lillinger E und U Mann (WismART 2014)
- Gebhard Ullmann, Gerhard Gschlößl, Johannes Fink, Jan Leipnitz GULF of Berlin (Jazzwerkstatt, 2014)
- Almut Kühne & Gebhard Ullmann Silver White Archives (Unit, 2014)
- Gebhard Ullmann & Basement Research: Hat and Shoes (Between the Lines, 2015)
- Gebhard Ullmann, Achim Kaufmann Geode (Leo Records 2016)
- Almut Kühne, Gebhard Ullmann, Achim Kaufmann Marbrakeys (Leo Records 2016)
- Steve Swell, Gebhard Ullmann, Fred Lonberg-Holm, Michael Zerang The Chicago Plan (Clean Feed 2016)
- The Clarinet Trio Live In Moscow with guest Alexey Kruglov (Leo Records 2017)
- Gebhard Ullmann, Oliver Portratz, Eric Schafer Das Kondensat (WhyPlay Jazz 2017)
- Gebhard Ullmann & Alexey Kruglov Moscow - Berlin (Fancy Music, 2018)
- Gebhard Ullmann & Basement Research Impromptus and Other Short Works (mit Julian Argüelles, Steve Swell, Pascal Niggenkemper, Gerald Cleaver) (WhyPlay Jazz 2019)
- Tatiana Komova, Almut Kühne, Alexey Kruglov, Gebhard Ullmann Deuce Crossings (Fancy Music 2019)
- Gebhard Ullmann, Hans Lüdemann, Oliver Potratz, Eric Schaefer mikroPULS (Intuition Records 2019)
- Conference Call Prism - Gebhard Ullmann, Michael Jefry Stevens, Joe Fonda, Dieter Ulrich (NotTwo Records, 2020)
- Das Kondensat 2 - Gebhard Ullmann, Oliver Potratz, Eric Schaefer (WhyPlay Jazz 2021)
- GULFH of Berlin - Gerhard Gschlössl, Gebhard Ullmann, Johannes Fink, Jan Leipnitz, Michael Haves (ESP-Disk' 2021)
- The Chicago Plan For New Zealand - Steve Swell, Gebhard Ullmann, Fred Lonberg-Holm, Michael Zerang (NotTwo Records 2022)
- The Clarinet Trio Transformations and Further Passages - Gebhard Ullmann, Jürgen Kupke, Michael Thieke (Leo Records 2022)
- Ullmann/Swell 4 We're Playing In Here? - Steve Swell, Gebhard Ullmann, Hilliard Greene, Barry Altschul (NoBusiness Records 2022)
- Das Kondensat: Andere Planeten - Gebhard Ullmann, Liz Kosack, Oliver Potratz, Eric Schaefer (WhyPlayJazz 2023)
- Hemisphere 4 - Gebhard Ullmann, Liz Kosack, Silke Lange, Taiko Saito (JazzHausMusik 2023)
- Twelve+1 Murals - Gebhard Ullmann/Philipp Gerschlauer (Between The Lines 2024)
- Gebhard Ullmann Impromptus und Interationen - Vitalii Kyianytsi (piano solo) (Kairos Recordings 2024)
- New Conference Call New Conference Call - Gebhard Ullmann, Uwe Oberg, Joe Fonda, Dieter Ulrich (HatHut Records 2025)
- Hemisphere 4 Kapitel Zwei - Gebhard Ullmann, Liz Kosack, Silke Lange, Taiko Saito (JazzHausMusik 2025)
- Gebhard Ullmann, Stephan Thelen, Udo Agnesens String Quartets - Al Pari Quartet (Fineline/Challenge 2025)
- GULF of Berlin For Timothy - Antje Messerschmidt, Gerhard Gschlössl, Gebhard Ullmann, Maike Hilbig, Jan Leipnitz, Michael Haves (ESP-Disk' 2026)
- Gebhard Ullmann Coffee and Berries - Steve Swell, Joe Morris, Charles Downs (ESP-Disk' 2026)

=== Sideman albums ===
- Die Elefanten: Nervous City (Nektar, 1985; with Chuck Purrington, Joachim Litty, Thomas Wegel, Andreas Weiser, Burkhard Schäffer, Hans Vogt, Klaus M. Staffa, Klaus Pankoke, Uli Moritz)
- Die Elefanten: Immer Alle, Immer Ich (Nektar, 1987; with Michael Merkelbach, Joachim Litty, Michael Rodach, Gerd Kaulard, Klaus M. Staffa, Andreas Weiser, Nikolaus Schäuble, Uli Moritz)
- Die Elefanten: Wasserwüste (Nabel, 1989, with Joachim Litty, Michael Rodach, Andreas Weiser, Klaus M. Staffa, Nikolaus Schäuble, Ulrich Moritz)
- Silent Jazz Ensemble: Silent Jazz Ensemble (Biber, 1989; with Helmut Engel-Musehold, Volker Heller, Elena Ledda, Johannes Wohlleben, Friedemann Witecka, Martin Lillich, Ulrich Moritz)
- Tayfun with Otto Sander: Eisen, Kohle und Zucker (Open Minds, 1991; with Hans Hartmann, Michael Clifton, Topo Gioia)
- Silent Jazz Ensemble: Kashina (Biber, 1991)
- Niko Schäuble Tibetan Dixie: Nothing too Serious (Larrikin, 1992)
- Günter Lenz: Springtime: Major League (Bellaphon, 1992; with Claus Stötter, Ernst-Ludwig Petrowsky, Bob Degen, Thomas Cremer)
- Die Elefanten: Faust (Klangräume, 1994)
- Silent Jazz Ensemble: Birds of Passage (Biber, 1996)
- Joe Fonda: Full Circle Suite (CIMP, 1999; with Taylor Ho Bynum, Chris Jonas, Kevin Norton)
- Tayfun: Dreams and Dances for a Silent Butterfly (Moods, 2001; with Eddie Hayes, Tobias Morgenstern, Uli Bartel, Matias de Oliveira Pinto, Renaud Garcia-Fons, Hans Hartmann, Andreas Weiser, Topo Gioia)
- Joe Fonda Loaded Basses (CIMP, 2006; with Claire Daly, Joe Daley, Michael Rabinowitz, Gerry Hemingway)
- Stereo Lisa Anno Onno Monno (Jazzwerkstatt, 2008; with Aki Sebastian Ruhl, Almut Kühne, Benjamin Weidekamp, Christian Marien, Ibadet Ramadani, Jürgen Kupke, Matthias Müller, Richard Koch, Michael Haves, Simon Harrer)
- Scott DuBois Quartet Banshees (Sunnyside, 2008)
- Sadiq Bey Slow the Ear (Allzeit Musik, 2009, with Kevin Ellington Mingus, Mfa Kera, Andrea Rost, Sophie Gothier)
- Günter Lenz Springtime Strict Minimum (Jazzwerkstatt, 2010; with Claus Stötter, Ernst-Ludwig Petrowsky, Dieter Glawischnig, Bill Elgart; rec. 2007)
- Chris Dahlgren & Lexicon Mystic Maze (Jazzwerkstatt, 2010)
- Scott DuBois Quartet Black Hawk Dance (Sunnyside, 2010)
- Scott DuBois Quartet Landscape Scripture (Sunnyside, 2012)
- Hannes Zerbe Orchester Eisleriana (JazzHausMusik, 2012)
- Hannes Zerbe Orchester Erlkönig (JazzHausMusik, 2013)
- Hans Hassler Hassler (Intakt, 2013)
- Satoko Fujii Orchestra Berlin Ichigo Ichie (Libra, 2015), with Richard Koch, Nikolaus Neuser, Matthias Müller, Matthias Schubert, Paulina Owczarek, Natsuki Tamura, Kazuhisa Uchihashi, Jan Roder, Michael Griener, Peter Orins
- Scott DuBois Quartet "Winter Light" (ACT Records, 2015)
- Bram De Looze "Septych" (Clean Feed, 2015)
- "United Sounds Of Leo" 3 CDs and DVD (ArtBeat, 2015)
- Scott DuBois Quartet "Autumn WinD" (ACT Records, 2017)
- Hannes Zerbe Orchester "Kalkutta" (JazzHausMusik, 2017)
- Satoko Fujii Orchestra Berlin Ninety-Nine Years (Libra, 2018)
- Vesna Pisarovic Petit Standard (Jazzwerkstatt 2019)
