= Cries and Whispers (album) =

Live album by Dominic Duval Quintet
- Released: 2001
- Recorded: August 30, 1999
- Venue: the Old Office in New York City, NY
- Genre: Jazz
- Length: 63:50
- Label: Cadence Jazz CJR 1111
- Producer: Bob Rusch and Dominic Duval

Dominic Duval chronology
Asylum (1999)	Cries and Whispers (2001)	American Scrapbook (2001)

Cries and Whispers is a live album by bassist Dominic Duval recorded in 1999 and released on the Cadence Jazz label.

== Reception ==
Professional ratings
Review scores
Source	Rating
Allmusic	4.5/5 stars
The Penguin Guide to Jazz Recordings	3/4 stars

Allmusic reviewer Steve Loewy states "this is one of the finest examples of free jazz at the turn of the century as you are likely to find, performed by five respected practitioners of the genre". In JazzTimes Aaron Steinberg noted "Overall, Cries and Whispers is not an easy album to listen to, and Duval's advocates already know what they're getting into with this. Nevertheless, Duval and his men modulate this program very well; they pay attention not only to mood, tempo and dynamics, but also to form, structure and development in a way that doesn't retard their improvisational aims but still makes for great and listenable chunks of music".

== Track listing ==
All compositions by Domenic Duval.

1. "Cries and Whispers I" – 13:40
2. "Cries and Whispers II" – 5:19
3. "Cries and Whispers III" – 8:13
4. "Cries and Whispers IV" – 10:57
5. "Cries and Whispers V" – 9:08
6. "Cries and Whispers VI" – 10:35
7. "Cries and Whispers VII" – 5:58

== Personnel ==
- Dominic Duval – bass
- Joe McPhee – tenor saxophone, flugelhorn
- Mark Whitecage – alto clarinet, alto saxophone
- Jason Hwang – violin
- Tomas Ulrich – cello
