= Dom Minasi =

American jazz guitarist (1943–2023)

Dom Minasi (March 6, 1943 – August 1, 2023) was an American jazz guitarist, composer, and music producer.

Minasi died on August 1, 2023, at the age of 80.

== Selected discography ==
- When Joanna Loved Me (Blue Note, 1974)
- I Have the Feeling I’ve Been Here Before (Blue Note, 1975)
- Finishing Touches (CIMP, 1999)
- Takin’ the Duke Out (CDM, 2002)
- Goin’ Out Again (CDM, 2002)
- Quick Response (CDM, 2004)
- The Vampire’s Revenge (CDM, 2006)
- Dissonance Makes the Heart Grow Fonder (2009)
- The Jon Hemmersam/Dom Minasi Quartet (CDM, 2007)
- The Sunshine Don't Mind My Singing (2014)
- Remembering Cecil (2019)
- Eight Hands One Mind (2021)
- Me Myself and I (2023)
