= The Brass City =

Studio album by Joe McPhee and Jeb Bishop
- Released: 1999
- Recorded: October 23, 1997
- Studio: Airwave (Chicago)
- Genre: Jazz
- Length: 58:44
- Label: Okka Disk OD12025
- Producer: Jeb Bishop and Joe McPhee

Joe McPhee chronology
Specific Gravity (1997)	The Brass City (1999)	Chicago Tenor Duets (2002)

The Brass City is an album by multi-instrumentalist and composer Joe McPhee with trombonist Jeb Bishop recorded in 1997 and first released on the Okka Disk label.

== Reception ==
Professional ratings
Review scores
Source	Rating
Allmusic	2.5/5 stars
The Penguin Guide to Jazz Recordings	3/4 stars

Allmusic reviewer Joslyn Layne states "The Brass City finds jazz original Joe McPhee and trombonist Jeb Bishop engaging in an interplay of extended techniques and freed-up structures."

== Track listing ==
All compositions by Joe McPhee and Jeb Bishop

1. "The Brass City I" - 12:17
2. "The Brass City II" - 3:44
3. "The Brass City III" - 2:16
4. "The Brass City IV" - 7:16
5. "The Brass City V" - 4:44
6. "The Brass City VI" - 5:47
7. "The Brass City VII" - 3:47
8. "Outpost" - 4:26
9. "Transmute" - 6:25
10. "The Rozwell Incident" - 8:02

== Personnel ==
- Joe McPhee - pocket cornet, valve trombone, soprano saxophone
- Jeb Bishop - trombone
