= Joe Giardullo =

American jazz musician

Joe Giardullo (born July 24, 1948, in Brooklyn, NY) is a soprano saxophonist and composer who is known for his work with Joe McPhee. While with McPhee, Giardullo has performed at some of the more notable jazz festivals. More recently, Giardullo has given workshops at themed events.

== Discography ==
- Primal Intentions (2001)
- Language of Swans (2002)
- Shadow & Light (2002)
- Art Spirit (2003)
- Now Is (2003)
- Falling Water (2004)
- Red Morocco (2007)

With Joe McPhee

- Specific Gravity (Boxholder 1997 [2001])
- In the Spirit (CIMP, 1999)
- No Greater Love (CIMP, 1999 [2000])
- Gravity (1979)
- Something Quiet (2011)
