= The Moons of Jupiter (short story) =

- Short story by Alice Munro
- Country: Canada
- Language: English

Publication
- Published in: The New Yorker
- Publication date: 22 May 1978

"The Moons of Jupiter" (1978/1982) is a short story by Canadian author Alice Munro, winner of the Nobel Prize in Literature in 2013. It deals with how facts may change over time. The story is 17 pages in length and made up of 7 sections with the shortest section being the final one.

== Synopsis ==
Janet, a divorced, middle-aged writer who has become somewhat successful, is visiting her dying father in a Toronto hospital, where she had driven him the day before. She stays overnight in the apartment of her younger daughter, Judith, who is taking a holiday with her boyfriend, and thinks about (and misses) her older daughter, Nichola, who prefers not to be in touch. Her father, who had initially decided against surgery (which meant a life expectancy of maybe three more months), has changed his mind and is scheduled for surgery the next day. Janet, who had started coming to terms with his prognosis, is unsettled because surgery means the risk of death on the table; in an effort to regain her composure, she goes to a planetarium and stays for a presentation, which prompts many realizations, among them that what was once fact can be supplanted by new information, new facts. That evening at the hospital, she quizzes her father on the moons of Jupiter and the mythical origins of the name of the moon Ganymede, knowing that these might be the last words she will ever hear him utter. The story ends with her reflecting on the moments after the planetarium show earlier that day, in which she came to some acceptance of her older daughter's and father's respective decisions (who both ran away from home, cutting all contact with their parents) and then returned to the hospital.

== Interpretation and criticism ==
In her congratulatory statement on Alice Munro's Nobel Prize in Literature 2013 in The Guardian, Margaret Atwood said with reference to this story that, first, success must first be striven for, and then it seems one has to apologize for it. Munro's characters are being punished even though they are successful, viz the example of the writer Janet in "The Moons of Jupiter", says Atwood. Tim McIntyre, in an analysis of 2009, points out that Munro's realism with its "capacity for characterization, compassion, and presence" is made to function in opposition to the author's "sophisticated understanding of language's inability to represent perfectly either the world or the totality of being."

== Publication history ==
"The Moons of Jupiter" was originally published in The New Yorker on 22 May, 1978, with a slightly different version being republished as the title story of Munro's fifth collection that came out in 1982. "The Moons of Jupiter" has been included in the author's own compilations three times, in 1996, in 2004 and in 2006, which makes the work range among those that have been republished the most. Furthermore, "The Moons of Jupiter" counts among the stories that generated Munro's international breakthrough during the years around 1980.

In the first version of the story, Janet is no writer but a painter. For the second version, "measurement" was added in section 5 (see italics): "I saw how the forms of love might be maintained with a beloved person but with the love in fact measured and disciplined, because you have to survive." Towards the end of the same section, in the sentence starting "Moonless Mercury rotating three times while circling the sun twice; an old arrangement, not as satisfying as the old one, for once" the comparison in the second version is replaced by "not as satisfying as what they used to tell us – that it rotated once and it circled the sun." (2nd version, 1982)
