= The All-Star Game (album) =

Live album by Marshall Allen, Hamid Drake, Kidd Jordan, William Parker, Alan Silva
- Released: 2003
- Recorded: December 1, 2000
- Venue: ICA Theater, Boston
- Genre: Free jazz
- Label: Eremite; MTE044
- Producer: Michael Ehlers

The All-Star Game is a live album by saxophonists Marshall Allen and Kidd Jordan, bassists William Parker and Alan Silva, and drummer Hamid Drake. It was recorded in December 2000 at the ICA Theater in Boston, and was released in 2003 by Eremite Records.

== Reception ==
Professional ratings
Review scores
Source	Rating
AllMusic	4/5 stars
The Penguin Guide to Jazz	3.5/4 stars

In a review for AllMusic, Thom Jurek wrote: "before you surrender to the erroneous notion that this is just some blowing session where skronk is the name of the game front and back, get real. These men are all improvisers of a different sort. All of them have played in very disciplined units and know how to make the most of dynamic, harmonic interplay, tonal dexterity, and (of course) group interplay as well as solo improvising... this music swings -- albeit in an entirely new way -- as hard as it blows."

The authors of the Penguin Guide to Jazz Recordings awarded the album 3½ stars, and stated: "The real interest of this date is how subtly and strongly the two bass-players work together, developing an involving discourse as the set continues and almost pushing the saxophones into an accompanying role in places."

Bill Shoemaker, writing for Jazz Times, commented: "The All-Star Game... manages to split the difference between a convivial homerun hitting contest and a soul-baring gestalt session... Not only do the musicians get ample opportunities to jack a few out of the park, they are also able to team up in various combinations and create inspired collective statements. Like the best midseason classics, The All-Star Game renews one's love of the game."

An All About Jazz article by Jeff Stockton stated: "Each of these players is an expert musician in every conceivable form of group interplay, from duos and trios to big bands, and The All-Star Game touches on all of them through improvisational creativity, disciplined restraint, or simple flat-out energy... The unifying vision here is hard blowing matched to equally hard swing, with the occasional relaxed passage to give us all a chance to catch our breath. For nearly 75 minutes they have at it, and not a single note is wasted."

Dan Warburton, in a review for Paris Transatlantic, wrote: "The combined age of these five gentlemen may be well past 300, but any one of them could go the full fifteen rounds with the young cats and probably floor them with a hook to boot."

== Track listing ==
All compositions by Marshall Allen, Hamid Drake, Kidd Jordan, William Parker, and Alan Silva.

No.	Title	Length
1.	"I"	9:54
2.	"II"	12:06
3.	"III"	13:34
4.	"IV"	11:16
5.	"V"	11:33
6.	"VI"	16:58
Total length:		75:21

== Personnel ==
- Marshall Allen – alto saxophone
- Kidd Jordan – tenor saxophone
- William Parker – bass
- Alan Silva – bass
- Hamid Drake – drums
