= Mister Peabody Goes to Baltimore =

Live album by Joe McPhee
- Released: 2001
- Recorded: September 21 at the American Visionary Arts Museum, September 22 at The 14K Cabaret and September 23 at The Charles Theater and Charles Street Bridge, as part of the High Zero Festival in Baltimore, Maryland, 2000.
- Genre: Jazz
- Length: 60:57
- Label: Recorded Recorded 005

Joe McPhee chronology
Angels, Devils & Haints (2000)	Mister Peabody Goes to Baltimore (2001)	On Tour (2001)

Mister Peabody Goes to Baltimore is a live album by composer and multi-instrumentalist Joe McPhee recorded in Baltimore, Maryland at the High Zero Festival in 2000 and first released on the Recorded label.

== Reception ==
Professional ratings
Review scores
Source	Rating
Allmusic	4/5 stars

Allmusic reviewer Eugene Chadbourne called it "a must-have for the free improvisation recording collection. On All About Jazz, Michael A. Parker called it "one the year’s most exploratory, and downright strange, improv records".

== Track listing ==
All compositions by Joe McPhee

1. "Before the Fall" - 33:38
2. "Night of the Krell" - 15:31
3. "Klatu" - 8:46
4. "Homeless" - 3:02

== Personnel ==
- Joe McPhee - tenor saxophone, alto saxophone, pocket trumpet, voice
- Jack Wright - reeds (track 1)
- Ian Nagoski - electronics (track 1)
- Michael Johnsen - electronics, soprano saxophone, musical saw (track 2)
- Sean Meehan - percussion (track 2)
- Jerry Lim - guitar (track 3)
- James Coleman - theremin (track 3)
