= Blaise Siwula =

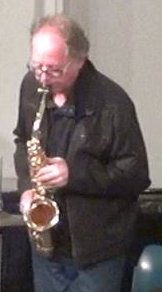
- Siwula playing at ABC No Rio

Background information
- Born: February 19, 1950 (age 76)
- Origin: Detroit
- Genres: Avant-garde jazz
- Occupations: Bandleader, composer
- Instrument: Alto saxophone
- Website: Official site

Blaise Siwula is a New York City based free jazz musician and curator.

Blaise Siwula was born in Detroit, Michigan on February 19, 1950. He moved to New York City in 1989 with his family, hoping to enter the music scene. He has collaborated on recordings with many artists, including Cecil Taylor. He also curates the weekly C.O.M.A. music event as ABC No Rio.

== Discography ==
- Projection: Zero
- Big Hearts
- The Slam Trio: In the Stillhouse
- Tandem Rivers with Adam Lane
- Joseph Scianni: One Eyed Jack
- Badlands
- Dialing Privileges
- Sound Scapes
