= Andrew Cheshire =

American jazz guitarist

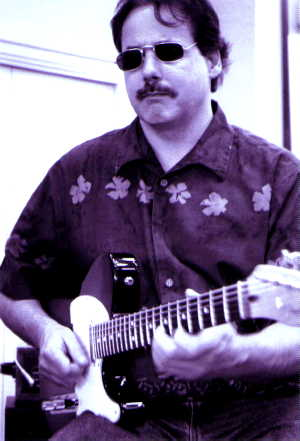

Background information
- Born: June 21, 1962 (age 64); Arverne, New York, U.S.
- Genres: Jazz
- Occupation: Musician
- Instrument: Guitar
- Years active: 1980–2012
- Label: Joule

Andrew Cheshire (born June 21, 1962) is an American jazz guitarist.

As a child, Cheshire played piano but switched to the guitar at age 10. While studying fine art, he played jazz in local bands around Long Island, New York. By 1980, Cheshire moved to Brooklyn where he began attending jam sessions at clubs such as the Blue Coronet and Pumpkins. During this time he had the opportunity play with Harold Mabern, Kenny Barron, Gil Coggins, Dewey Redman, and Louis Hayes.

In 1991, Cheshire had become a member of drummer Walter Perkins group and began forming an association with members of the M-Base collective. During this period he recorded his first sides as a leader, which appear on the album Water Street Revival. In the mid-1990s, Cheshire formed associations with tenor saxophonist Rich Perry, bassist Ron McClure, and pianist Don Friedman; the latter recording two albums together: Cheshire's This is Me (1996) and Friedman's Attila's Dreams (1998) dedicated to Friedman's friend and musical associate, Attila Zoller.

Cheshire has written compositions for jazz ensemble. His other musical interests encompass world music and classical, for which he completed a string quartet. As an electric guitarist, Cheshire's interest in amplification led him to design and build guitar amplifiers with original circuits and visual themes. His oil paintings adorn the covers of most of his albums.

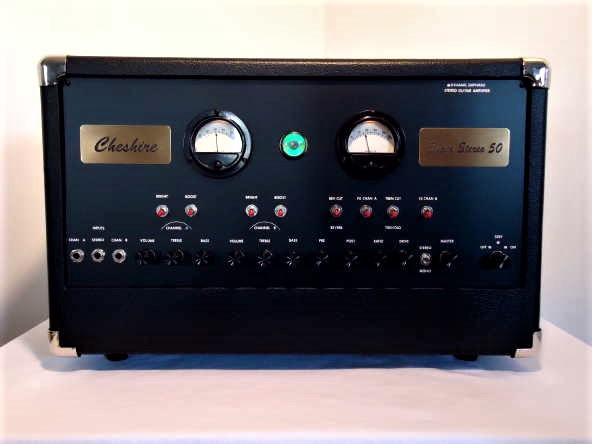
Cheshire Super Stereo 50 Guitar Amplifier

== Discography ==
- This Is Me (Joule, 1996)
- Another View (Joule, 1997)
- Water Street Revival (Joule, 1998)
- Magic (Joule, 2000)
- Guitar Noir (Joule, 2001)
- Faces (Joule, 2002)
- Morning Song (Joule, 2003)
- Pavane Pour Une Infante Difunte (Joule, 2003)
- Four Ages of Bob (Joule, 2004)
- Man is an Island (Joule, 2005)
- Silent Trees Falling (Joule, 2006)
- Virtual String Quartet (Joule, 2007)
- Ballads (Joule, 2010)
- Another View Live! (Joule, 2014)
- Pyramids (Joule, 2014)
