= Kevin Whitehead =

American jazz critic & author (born 1952)

- Born: Kevin Francis Whitehead; April 27, 1952 (age 74); New York City, New York, U.S.
- Education: Oswego State University; Syracuse University (MA)
- Occupations: Jazz critic, author, journalist
- Writing career
- Period: 1970s–present
- Subjects: Jazz, music criticism

Kevin Francis Whitehead (born April 27, 1952) is an American jazz critic and author.

== Biography ==
Born in New York City, Whitehead studied at Oswego State University in New York, then earned a Masters in American Literature and Culture at Syracuse University. He began writing in the early 1970s for the short-lived magazine Oswego County Times. In 1979, he wrote his first record review, for Joni Mitchell's Mingus.

Since the end of the 1970s, Whitehead has been writing regularly on jazz, including for the NPR program Fresh Air with Terry Gross since 1987, as well as for newspapers and magazines such as JazzTimes, Chicago Sun-Times, Chicago Reader, Down Beat, Village Voice, and the Volkskrant. He lived in the Netherlands in the late 1990s.

Whitehead wrote the books New Dutch Swing (1998) and Why Jazz: A Concise Guide (2010) and (with the photographer Ton Mijs) Instant Composers Pool Orchestra: You Have to See It (2011). He is also editor of Bimhuis 25: Stories of Twenty-Five Years at the Bimhuis. His works have appeared in anthologies such as Jazz: The First Century, The Gramophone Jazz Good CD Guide, Mixtery: a Commemorative for Anthony Braxton, Da Capo's Best Music Writing 2006 and Traveling the Spaceways: Sun Ra, the Astro Black and other Solar Myths.

Whitehead has also written liner notes for albums, including recordings by Ab Baars, Sylvie Courvoisier, Charles Gayle, François Houle, Phillip Johnston, Sheila Jordan, Franklin Kiermyer, Henry Threadgill, Myra Melford (Michael Moore, 1993), Simon Nabatov / Han Bennink, Pharoah Sanders, Daniel Schnyder, Aki Takase, the Ethnic Heritage Ensemble, Clusone 3, and the ICP Orchestra. In 2012 he was nominated for the JJA Award of the Jazz Journalists Association for his liner notes of the Sam Rivers album Trilogy (Mosaic Select). He also taught jazz literature at Towson University, University of Kansas, and Goucher College.

As an improvisational musician, Whitehead played in the free jazz group Starship Beer, as well as appearing at New York's Knitting Factory, Chicago's Empty Bottle and HotHouse, and the Amsterdam Zaal 100. He lives near Baltimore.

== Publications ==
- New Dutch Swing: An in-depth examination of Amsterdam's vital and distinctive jazz scene. Billboard Books, New York 1998, ISBN 0-8230-8334-9.
- Kevin Whitehead, Herman te Loo, John Corbett: Bimhuis 25. Stories of twenty five years at the Bimhuis. Bimhuis, Amsterdam 1999, OCLC 67738497.
- Why Jazz?: A Concise Guide. Oxford University Press, 2011, ISBN 978-0-19-973118-3.
