= Steve Salerno =

American conservative nonfiction author, essayist and educator

- Citizenship: US
- Occupation: Author
- Writing career
- Language: English
- Genre: Non-fiction
- Subject: Self-help
- Notable work: SHAM

Steve Salerno is an American nonfiction author, essayist, and educator who has written three books, including SHAM: How the Self-Help Movement Made America Helpless, a critique of the self-help movement, and Deadly Blessing, about the death of Price Daniel Jr., which became the TV movie Bed of Lies. The latter book and movie dealt with themes of domestic abuse.

== Early life and education ==
He received a Bachelor of Arts degree in English and writing in 1972 from Brooklyn College.

== Career ==
Salerno was a visiting professor of journalism at Indiana University, has taught as an adjunct instructor at Lehigh University, and teaches at the University of Nevada, Las Vegas.

In November 2005, Salerno appeared on a segment of Anderson Cooper's 360° to discuss the validity of the self-help industry. He discussed the self-help industry further on ABC Radio National where he was quoted as saying that the "happiness industry is banking on keeping us unhappy."

=== Book ===
His book SHAM, a critique of self-help, received mostly positive reviews, with some reviewers describing Salerno's coverage as overreach in his analysis of self-help's broader effects in society. In the book, Salerno argues that self-help in recent decades has done significant damage to the American social fabric. Salerno argues that damage principally to self-esteem-based education and the fallout from the two polar schools of self-help thoughts, victimization and empowerment. He is highly critical of Alcoholics Anonymous and derivative 12-step programs. He has also described the self-help movement's intrusion into politics. He also wrote of self-help having fatal consequences for participants at a self-help seminar by guru James Arthur Ray in 2009.

After the book's publication Salerno wrote essays on self-help's influence in politics and medicine.

== Awards ==
He was given a silver award in 2019 from the annual National Mature Media Awards for an article he wrote in AARP The Magazine's April/May 2018 edition. Salerno was awarded as Outstanding Faculty of the Year at University of Nevada Las Vegas for 2020.

== Published works ==
- The Newest Profession (1985)
- Deadly Blessing (1987) Made into TV movie 'Bed of Lies', 1992
- SHAM: How the Self-Help Movement Made America Helpless (2005)
