= Marshall Allen =

American jazz saxophonist (born 1924)

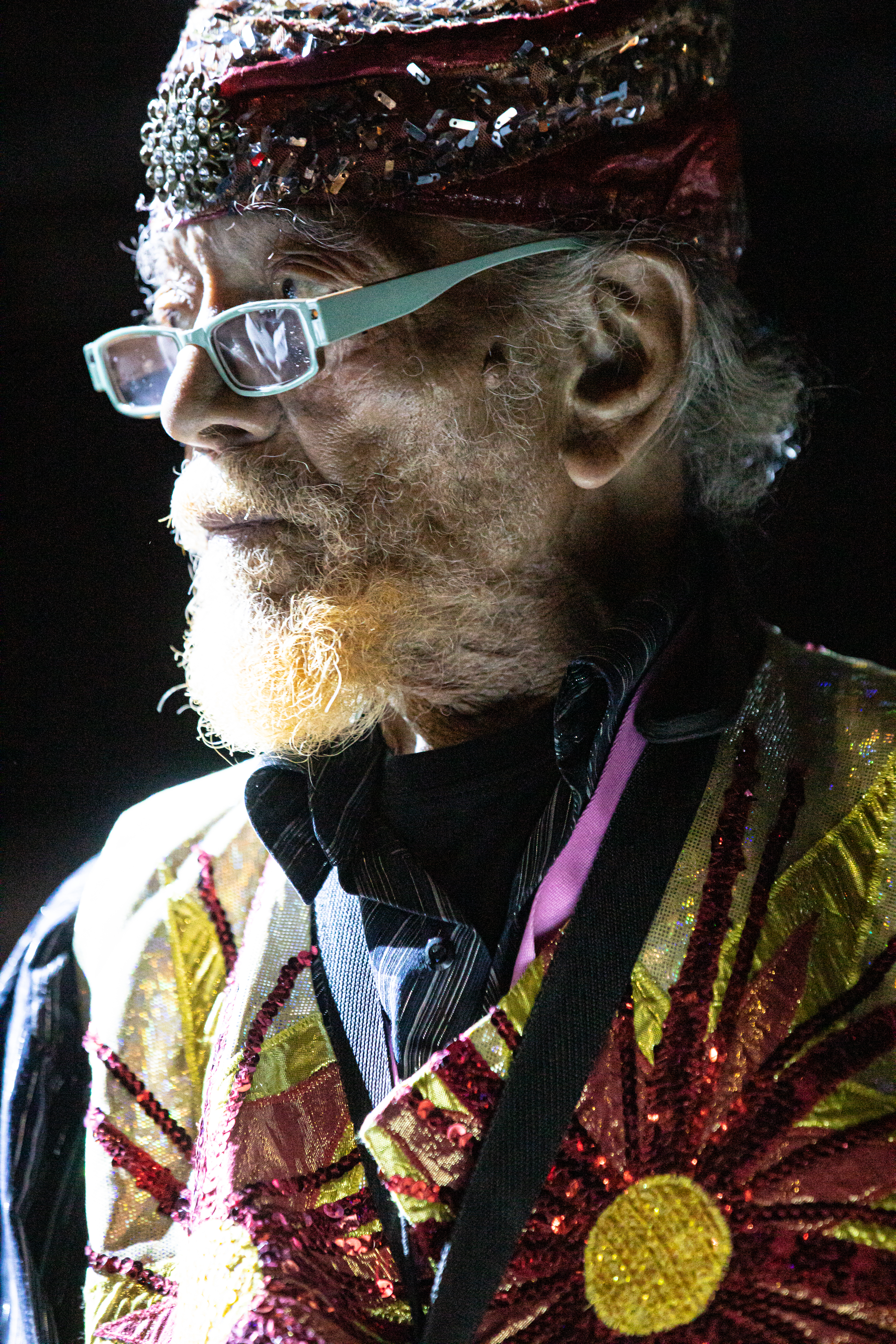
- Allen in 2019

Background information
- Born: Marshall Belford Allen; May 25, 1924 (age 102); Louisville, Kentucky, U.S.
- Genres: Jazz
- Occupation: Musician
- Instruments: Saxophone; flute; oboe; piccolo; EWI
- Labels: CIMP; ESP-Disk; Eremite Records; RareNoiseRecords; Mulata
- Member of: The Sun Ra Arkestra

Marshall Belford Allen (born May 25, 1924) is an American free jazz and avant-garde jazz alto saxophone player. He also performs on flute, oboe, piccolo, and the EWI.

Allen is best known for his work with Sun Ra, having recorded and performed mostly in this context since the late 1950s, and having led the Sun Ra Arkestra since 1995, after Sun Ra's death in 1993 and John Gilmore's death two years later. Critic Jason Ankeny describes Marshall as "one of the most distinctive and original saxophonists of the postwar era."

== Biography ==
=== Early life and military service ===
Marshall Belford Allen was born on May 25, 1924, in Louisville, Kentucky.

During the Second World War he enlisted in the 92nd Infantry Division, known as the Buffalo Soldiers Division, and was stationed in France. Allen studied alto saxophone in Paris.

=== Music career ===
Allen played in Europe with jazz pianist Art Simmons and saxophonist James Moody.

Allen is best known for his mastery of explosive, jarring, chaotic sound effects on the alto saxophone. Some have referred to this as a "pyrotechnic" playing style. He has said that he "wanted to play on a broader sound basis rather than on chords" (1971 interview with Tam Fiofori)). The opportunity came through his long association with Sun Ra, with whom he performed almost exclusively from 1958 to Ra's death in 1993, although he did record outside The Sun Ra Arkestra, with Paul Bley's group in 1964 and Olatunji's group during the mid-1960s. Critic Scott Yanow has described Allen's playing as "Johnny Hodges from another dimension".

After Sun Ra died, first John Gilmore led the Arkestra, then Allen took over as leader. The Arkestra recorded two albums with Allen as their bandleader. In May 2004, Allen celebrated his 80th birthday on stage with the Arkestra, as part of their performance at the Ninth Vision Festival in New York City. Allen gave other performances on his birthday in 2008 at Sullivan Hall and at Iridium Jazz Club in 2018, both in New York City.

Allen often appeared in New York-area collaborations with bassist Henry Grimes and has also participated in the "Innerzone Orchestra" together with Francisco Mora Catlett, Carl Craig and others in an appreciation of Sun Ra's music. He performed the part of Sun Ra, the Egyptian god, in The Eighth Hour of Amduat, an opera with text from a 5000-year-old book on the sun's nightly journey through the underworld.

== Honors and later life ==
Since 1968, Allen has lived in the Arkestral Institute of Sun Ra in Germantown, Philadelphia. In 2022, it was listed as a historic landmark in the Philadelphia Register of Historic Places.

Allen turned 100 on May 25, 2024.

On October 4, 2024, he released the first single "African Sunset" from his forthcoming debut album as a solo artist which was recorded a few days after his 100th birthday. The album New Dawn was released on February 14, 2025.

== Discography ==
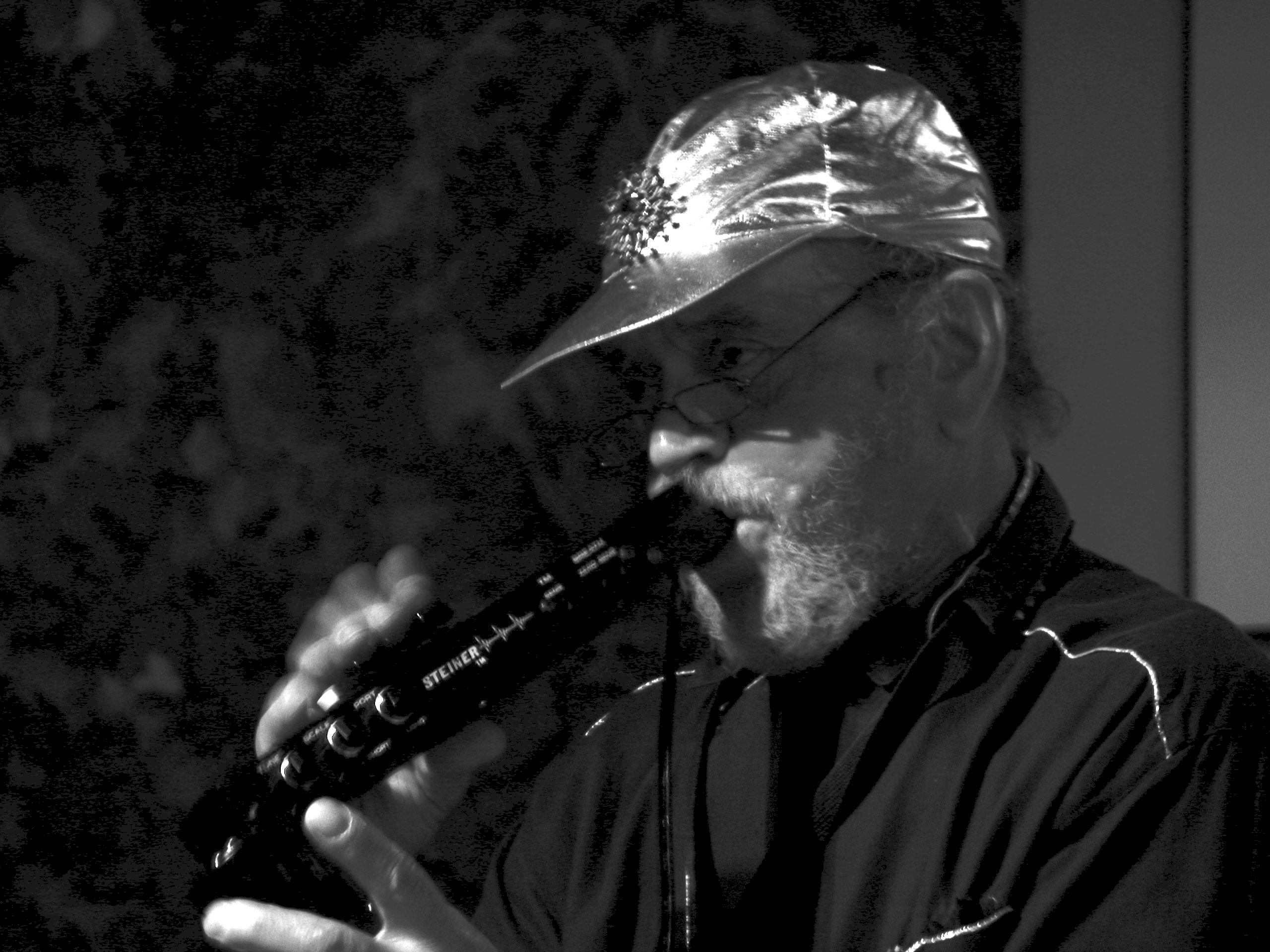
Allen in 2005, playing a Steiner EVI

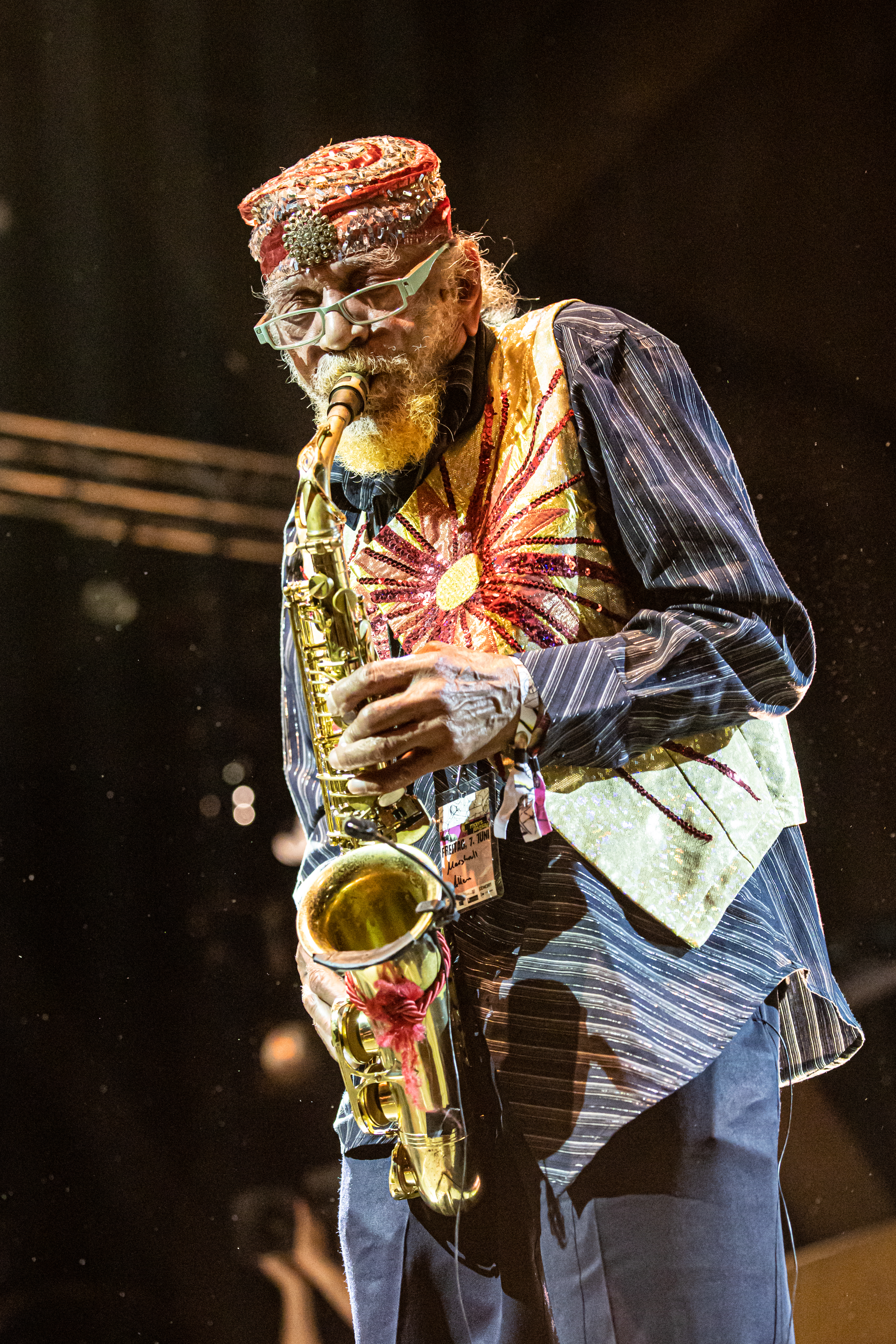
Marshall Allen at the Moers Festival 2019

=== As leader ===
- 1998: Mark–n–Marshall: Monday (CIMP)
- 1998: Mark–n–Marshall: Tuesday (CIMP)
- 2000: PoZest (CIMP)
- 2025: New Dawn (Week-End Records)

=== As co-leader ===
- 2003: The All-Star Game (Eremite) with Hamid Drake, Kidd Jordan, William Parker, and Alan Silva
- 2003: Opportunities & Advantages (CIMP) with Elliott Levin and the Tyrone Hill Quintet
- 2005: Ten by Two (Edisun) with Terry Adams
- 2005: Cosmic Tsunami (Nolabel) with Michael Ray, Toshi Makihara, and Jeffrey Shurdut
- 2010: Night Logic (RogueArt) with Matthew Shipp and Joe Morris
- 2011: Vibrations of the Day (Re:konstruKt) with Konstrukt, Hüseyin Ertunç, and Barlas Tan Özemek
- 2014: Two Stars in the Universe (Little Rocket) with Kash Killion
- 2015: We Are Not The First (RVNG Intl.) with Hieroglyphic Being, Daniel Carter, Greg Fox, Shelley Hirsch, Shahzad Ismaily, Elliott Levin, Rafael Sanchez, and Ben Vida
- 2019: Ceremonial Healing (RareNoiseRecords) with Danny Ray Thompson, Jamie Saft, Trevor Dunn, Balázs Pándi, and Roswell Rudd
- 2020: Flow States (ScienSonic) with Roscoe Mitchell, Scott Robinson, and Milford Graves

=== As sideman ===
With Terry Adams

- Terrible (New World Records, 1995)

With Paul Bley

- Barrage (ESP-Disk, 1965)

With Dick Griffin

- Homage to Sun Ra (Ruby, 2014)

With Tyrone Hill

- Out of the Box (CIMP, 1998)

With Medeski, Martin and Wood

- The Dropper (Blue Note, 2000)

With The Muffins and Knoel Scott

- Loveletter #2 The Ra Sessions (Hobart Films & Records, 2005)

With the Odean Pope Trio

- In This Moment (CIMP, 2016)

With Alan Silva

- H.Con.Res.57/Treasure Box (Eremite, 2003)

With Dave Soldier

- The Eighth Hour of Amduat (Mulatta Records, 2016)

With Surrender to the Air

- Surrender to the Air (Elektra, 1996)

With Hawk Tubley & The Airtight Chiefs

- Cooking With Dynamite! (2011)
