= Michael Jefry Stevens =

Michael Jefry Stevens (born New York City, 13 March 1951) is an American jazz pianist. Stevens currently resides in Black Mountain, North Carolina.

Stevens has been active for over 40 years with many New York jazz ensembles. With bassist Joe Fonda he led the Fonda-Stevens Group and recorded several highly regarded post-bop albums. "Birdtalk is a clear reference to the bop roots of most of the players. So absorbing is the music that after countless listens we hadn't quite noticed that Stevens was largely absent, until he pointed it out."

Pianist, Composer and “Steinway Artist,” Michael Jefry Stevens performs extensively in Europe, Latin America and North America. He was voted “Best Composer of 2016” by readers of the Mountain Xpress Asheville, NC and was a recipient of a 2017 Regional Project Grant through the North Carolina Arts Council.

He has composed over 400 works for both large and small ensembles. An active band-leader for over 40 years, his current working musical ensembles include the "Fonda/Stevens Group," the Hungarian "Eastern Boundary Quartet," “Don Aliquo/Michael Jefry Stevens duo, the Michael Rabinowitz Quartet South, the Lillard/Stevens Sextet, Asheville Jazz Orchestra, as well as his current trio, quartet and quintet. Michael has released over 100 Cds and has performed and/or recorded extensively with many of the top names in Jazz, including Dave Liebman, Oliver Lake, Dave_Douglas_(trumpeter), Leo Smith, Matt Wilson, Han Bennink, Mark Feldman, Pheeroan AkLaff, Gerry Hemingway, Charles Moffett Sr., Billy Martin, and many others. Michael co-led the Brooklyn Jazz Composer's Orchestra with Jeff Raheb in the mid 1990s, and was a member of the BMI Jazz Composer's Institute during that time. His solo piano recordings include "The Survivor's Suite", "Portrait in Red" and most recently "Lazy Afternoon".

Stevens moved back to New York City in 1980 and lived in Brooklyn until 2002, at which time he moved to Memphis, TN and married his wife, poet Tina Barr. His early recordings include "The Mosaic Sextet" on Konnex Record Label (the group featured Dave Douglas, Mark Feldman, Michael Rabinowitz, Harvey Sorgen and Joe Fonda), as well as his first CD release at a member of Mark Whitecage's Liquid Time. In the early 1990s, he began a fruitful relationship with Leo Records which includes his duo CD "Haiku" with Mark Feldman and several recordings with his long-time collaborator Dominic Duval (The Equinox Trio and Elements).

He was the “Margaret Lee Crofts Fellow” for 2000–2001 at the MacDowell Colony, and was a Centrum Arts composer fellow (2004). Stevens was an artist in residence for at EMU Conservatory in La Plata, Argentina between 2005 and 2010, and has taught at the Royal Academy of Music in Denmark, Sibelius Academy in Finland, University of Michigan, Indiana University, and many other educational institutions in Europe, Latin America and North America.
