= Jay Rosen (drummer) =

American jazz drummer (born 1961)

- Born: November 20, 1961 (age 63); Philadelphia, Pennsylvania, U.S.
- Genres: Jazz
- Occupation: Musician
- Instrument: Drums
- Labels: CIMP, Cadence Jazz
- Website: jay-rosen.com

Jay Rosen (born November 20, 1961) is an American jazz drummer. He is a member of Trio X with Joe McPhee and Dominic Duval and performs in Cosmosomatics with Sonny Simmons.

== Career ==
At age 10, Rosen became interested in jazz drumming after seeing Tony Williams perform with Sonny Rollins. He took lessons from Tracy Alexander, son of Mousey Alexander (with an occasional lesson from the elder Alexander). Later, he would study briefly with Barry Altschul.

Around age 18, Rosen became a professional musician. He worked at studios, weddings, and cocktail lounges in rock, rhythm and blues, country, jazz, and Brazilian music. His recording career in improvised music began in the mid-1990s, when he recorded Split Personality (GM Records) with Mark Whitecage and Dominic Duval. He began an association with the CIMP label in 1996, and has also recorded for Cadence). Todd Jenkins describes Rosen and Duval as the "house rhythm section" for CIMP, given the number of recordings on which they have appeared.

Since 1998, Rosen has performed with Joe McPhee and Dominic Duval in Trio X. In 2000, he joined Cosmosomatics, a quartet with saxophonists Sonny Simmons and Michael Marcus and bassist William Parker.

Rosen describes himself as "a musician who plays percussion" rather than "'just a drummer.'" He uses a set of small cymbals that he approaches "like a string player, or a reed player," and his drum kit includes objects such as a boat propeller and a set of organ pipes that he activates with foot-driven bellows. Although Rosen is associated with free improvisation, he questions whether the music he plays is "free:"

"While 'free music' indicates that you're free to play whatever you want to play and you're not following chord progressions, and there's no time, there's no this, no that...The way I've been playing free music, with my constituents, doesn't really follow those guidelines. When we play, it's very well put together, in actuality. We're not just blowing to blow; there's listening going on, there's concerted effort at construction and organization, at putting things together — at minute levels — that hardly go on in 'free music' anymore."

== Discography ==
=== As leader or co-leader ===
- The Hammer (Leo, 2000) with Ivo Perelman
- Canticles for the New Millennium (CIMP, 2000) with Vinny Golia, Paul Smoker, Mark Whitecage
- Drums 'n' Bugles (CIMP, 2002)
- Songs for Samuel (CIMP, 2005)
- No Prisoners (CIMP, 2012) with Dominic Duval, Jon Irabagon, Demian Richardson

With The Cosmosamatics

- The Cosmosamatics (Boxholder, 2001)
- The Cosmosamatics II (Boxholder, 2001)
- Three (Boxholder, 2004)
- Magnitudes (Soul Note, 2005)

With Resonance Impeders

- Resonance Impeders (CIMP, 1998) with Chris Dahlgren, Briggan Krauss
- At All Costs Unknown (CIMP, 2001)

With Trio X

- Rapture (Cadence Jazz, 1998)
- The Watermelon Suite (CIMP, 1999)
- On Tour: Toronto/Rochester (Cadence Jazz, 2001)
- In Black and White (Cadence, 2002)
- Journey (CIMP, 2003)
- The Sugar Hill Suite (CIMP, 2004)
- Moods Playing with the Elements (CIMP, 2005)
- Traumerei (Prophone, 2015)
- Air: Above & Beyond (City Hall, 2015)
- Live on Tour 2010 (City Hall, 2016)
- Live in Green Bay and Buffalo (Cimpol/City Hall, 2016)
- Live at Craig Kessler & Janet Lessner's (CIMP/City Hall, 2016)
- 2006 U.S. Tour (Cimpol/City Hall, 2016)
- Live at Kerrytown (Cimpol/City Hall, 2016)
- Live at the Sugar Maple (Cimpol/City Hall, 2016)

=== As sideman ===
With Andrew Cheshire

- 1998 Relax Keep the Tension Please
- 2000 Magic
- 2002 Faces
- 2003 Morning Song

With Dominic Duval

- 1997 The Wedding Band
- 2001 Asylem
- 2003 No Respect

With John Gunther

- 1997 Healing Song
- 1997 Permission Granted
- 1998 Above Now Below
- 2001 Gone Fishing
- 2005 In This World

With Ivo Perelman

- 1996 Revelation
- 1996 Seeds Visions and Counterpoint
- 1996 Slaves of Job
- 1999 Sieiro
- 2001 The Seven Energies of the Universe

With Mark Whitecage

- 1996 Caged No More
- 1996 Free for Once
- 1997 3 + 4 = 5
- 1998 Split Personality
- 1999 Research on the Edge

With others

- 1995 Inner Voice, Mike Frost
- 1996 Elements, Michael Jefry Stevens
- 1996 Falling in Flat Space, Herb Robertson
- 1997 Moons of Jupiter, Steve Swell
- 1998 Standard Deviation, Paul Smoker
- 2002 Blue Reality, Michael Marcus
- 2005 Wishing You Were Here, Chris Kelsey
- 2006 Cut It Out, Gebhard Ullmann
