= CIMP =

American jazz record company and label

Creative Improvised Music Projects
- Parent company: CadNor Ltd.
- Founded: 1995
- Founder: Bob Rusch
- Distributor: Cadence/NorthCountry
- Genre: Jazz
- Country of origin: U.S.
- Location: Redwood, New York
- Official website: www.cimprecords.com

Creative Improvised Music Projects, usually abbreviated CIMP or C.I.M.P., is an American jazz record company and label. It is associated with Cadence magazine and Cadence Jazz Records. The label is noted for its minimal use of electronic processing and its spare microphoning technique. Bob Rusch founded CIMP in 1995, with his son Marc Rusch as the recording engineer and his daughter Kara Rusch producing cover art.

The label recorded its first session in 1995 for an album that featured Evan Parker, Barry Guy, Paul Lytton, and Joe McPhee. From the beginning, it has concentrated on avant-garde jazz. Its catalogue includes Marshall Allen, Herb Robertson, Paul Smoker, Glenn Spearman, and Steve Swell. Most of its releases are recorded in its own studio in Rossie, New York.

Eighteen compilations of music released on the label have been released, titled the Cimposium series.

== Artists ==
- Aaron James
- Adam Lane
- Ahmed Abdullah
- Akira Ando
- Alex Blake
- Alex Harding
- Alex Horwitz
- Allen Nelson
- Alvin Benjamin Carter Jr.
- Alvin Benjamin Carter Sr.
- Anders Griffen
- Andrei Strobert
- Andrew Cheshire
- Andrew Cyrille
- Andrew Lamb
- Andrew White
- Andy Eulau
- Andy Laster
- Anthony Braxton
- Ari Brown
- Art Baron
- Arthur Blythe
- Arthur Harper
- Assif Tsahar
- Atu Harold Murray
- Avram Fefer
- Barry Altschul
- Barry Guy
- Ben Koen
- Bern Nix
- Bert Harris
- Bhob Rainey
- Bill Gagliardi
- Bill Lowe
- Bill Meek
- Billy Bang
- Billy Pierce
- Blaise Siwula
- Bob Butta
- Bob Celusak
- Bob Fraser
- Bob Magnusson
- Bob Marsh
- Bob Pilkington
- Bob Stewart
- Bob Washington
- Bobby Bradford
- Bobby Few
- Bobby Zankel
- Brian Settles
- Brandon Evans
- Brett Allen
- Brian Landrus
- Brian Smith
- Briggan Krauss
- Bruce Eisenbeil
- Bryan Carrott
- Burton Greene
- Byard Lancaster
- Calvin Hill
- Carl Grubbs
- Carlos Ward
- Carmen Intorre
- Casey Benjamin
- Chad Taylor
- Charles Burnham
- Charles Eubanks
- Charles Moffett
- Charlie Kohlhase
- Chris Dahlgren
- Chris Jonas
- Chris Kelsey
- Chris Lightcap
- Chris Matthay
- Chris McCann
- Chris Sullivan
- Christopher Cauley
- Claire Daly
- Claude Lawrence
- Clifford Barbaro
- Cody Moffett
- Craig McIver
- Curt Warren
- Damion Reid
- Damon Short
- Daniel Carter
- Darrell Katz
- Dave Burrell
- Dave Hofstra
- David Bindman
- David Bond
- David Brandt
- David Eyges
- David Haney
- David Harris
- David Murray
- David Prentice
- David Schnitter
- David Taylor
- David Wertman
- David White
- Denis Charles
- Denman Maroney
- Derrek Phillips
- Devorah Day
- Dom Minasi
- Dominic Duval
- Dominick Farinacci
- Donald Robinson
- Donald Smith
- Donna Cumberbatch
- Doug Webb
- Drew Gress
- Dwight James
- Dylan Taylor
- Ed Crockett
- Ed Schuller
- Ed Ware
- Ed Watkins
- Edgar Bateman
- Edward Perraud
- Ehran Elisha
- Elliot Levin
- Elliott Levin
- Eric Hipp
- Erik Torrente
- Ernest Dawkins
- Ernie Krivda
- ESATrio
- Ethan Mann
- Evan Parker
- Francois Grillot
- Frank Lowe
- Fred Hess
- Fred Lonberg-Holm
- Frode Gjerstad
- Gebhard Ullmann
- Geoff Mann
- George Cartwright
- George Cremaschi
- George Garzone
- George Schuller
- Gerry Hemingway
- Glenn Spearman
- Grachan Moncur III
- Greg Badolato
- Greg Maker
- Greg Millar
- Gregg Bendian
- Gregor Huebner
- Hamiet Bluiett
- Hands Indigo
- Harold E. Smith
- Harris Eisenstadt
- Harvey Sorgen
- Herb Robertson
- Hilliard Greene
- Hiroaki Honshuku
- Howard Cooper
- Howard Johnson
- Hugh Ragin
- Igal Foni
- Ivo Perelman
- J. Brunka
- J. D. Allen
- J. R. Mitchell
- Jack Wright
- James Finn
- Jason Hwang
- Jason Oettel
- Jay Rosen
- Jazz Composers Alliance Orchestra
- Jean Derome
- Jean-Luc Guionnet
- Jeff Halsey
- Jeff Lederer
- Jeff Williams
- Jemeel Moondoc
- Jeremy Carlstedt
- Jeremy Udden
- Jesse Dulman
- Jim Gray
- Jim Mosher
- Jim Odgren
- Jimmy Halperin
- Jimmy Weinstein
- Jims Hobbs
- Joe Daley
- Joe Fiedler
- Joe Fonda
- Joe Giardullo
- Joe McPhee
- Joe Rosenberg
- Joe Ruddick
- John Bacon Jr.
- John Bickerton
- John Bollinger
- John Carlson
- John Gunther
- John Hébert
- John Heward
- John Lockwood
- John O'Gallagher
- John Oswald
- John Pierce
- John Swana
- John Tchicai
- John Turner
- Jon Hazilla
- Jorge Sylvester
- Joris Dudli
- Joseph Bowie
- Joseph Jarman
- Joseph Scianni
- Joy Rosen
- Julian Priester
- Kahil El'Zabar
- Kahlil Kwame Bell
- Kalaparusha Maurice McIntyre
- Keiichi Hashimoto
- Kelly Meashey
- Kelvyn Bell
- Ken Filiano
- Ken Schaphorst
- Ken Simon
- Ken Wessel
- Kevin Norton
- Kevin O'Neil
- Khan Jamal
- Konrad Bauer
- Ku-umba Frank Lacy
- Kurt Kotheimer
- Kyle Hernandez
- Laura Andel
- Lee Shaw
- Leo Huppert
- Lisle Ellis
- Lonnie Solaway
- Lou Grassi
- Lucian Ban
- Luqman Ali
- Luther Gray
- Luther Thomas
- Mads Thorsen
- Malachi Favors
- Marc Edwards
- Marc Pompe
- Marc Sabatella
- Marco Eneidi
- Marilyn Crispell
- Mark Dresser
- Mark Feldman
- Mark Helias
- Mark Johnson
- Mark Whitecage
- Marshall Allen
- Mary Anne Driscoll
- Mary LaRose
- Masa Kamaguchi
- Masashi Harada
- Masujaa
- Mat Marucci
- Matt Bauder
- Matt Davis
- Matt Engle
- Matt Langley
- Matt Lavelle
- Matt Penman
- Matt Wilson
- Melani Dyer
- Michael Attias
- Michael Bisio
- Michael Bocchicchio
- Michael Carvin
- Michael Logan
- Michael Marcus
- Michael Rabinowitz
- Michael Taylor
- Mike Bisio
- Mike Bullock
- Mike DeMicco
- Mike Peipman
- Mike Sarin
- Nate Wooley
- Ned Rothenberg
- Newman Baker
- Newman Taylor Baker
- Nick Tountas
- Nils Wogram
- Noah Howard
- Norma Zocher
- Odean Pope
- Okkyung Lee
- Ori Kaplan
- Patrick Brennan
- Paul Dunmall
- Paul Lytton
- Paul Murphy
- Paul Rogers
- Paul Smoker
- Perry Robinson
- Pete Vinson
- Peter Brötzmann
- Peter Dominquez
- Peter Kowald
- Peter Valsamis
- Pheeroan akLaff
- Phil Haynes
- Phil Scarff
- Philipp Wachsmann
- Phillip Johnston
- Pierre Dorge
- Prince Lasha
- Pucci Jhones
- Ralph Peterson, Jr.
- Ras Moshe
- Rashid Bakr
- Ravish Momin
- Ray Anderson
- Reggie Nicholson
- Rich Syracuse
- Richard A. McGhee III
- Richie Barshay
- Rick Iannacone
- Rick McLaughlin
- Rob Brown
- Rob Thomas
- Robert Rusch
- Ron Godale
- Ron Horton
- Ron Lawrence
- Ron Miles
- Ronnie Burrage
- Rory Stuart
- Rosella Washington
- Rosie Hertlein
- Roswell Rudd
- Roy Campbell, Jr.
- Russ Nolan
- Rusty Jones
- Ryan Sawyer
- Sabir Mateen
- Salim Washington
- Sam Bardfeld
- Samarai Celestial
- Scott Neumann
- Scott Rosenberg
- Seth Meicht
- Shawn McGloin
- Shingo Okudaira
- Sipho Robert Bellinger
- Sonny Simmons
- Soo-Jung Kae
- Sophie Duner
- Stephen Gauci
- Steve Lehman
- Steve Neil
- Steve Novosel
- Steve Salerno
- Steve Swell
- Steve Wallace
- T.J. Graham
- Takaaki Masuko
- Taylor Ho Bynum
- Ted Daniels
- Thomas Borgmann
- Thomas Ulrich
- Tim Armacost
- Tim Daisy
- Tim Flood
- Tim Mayer
- Todd Margasak
- Todd Nicholson
- Tom Abbs
- Tom DeSteno
- Tom Varner
- Tomas Ulrich
- Tony Malaby
- Trio X
- Tristan Honsinger
- Tyrone Brown
- Tyrone Hill
- Ursel Schlicht
- Valery Ponomarev
- Vijay Anderson
- Vincent Chancey
- Vinny Golia
- Wade Barnes
- Warren Senders
- Warren Smith
- Wilber Morris
- Wilbur Morris
- Will Connell
- William Gagliardi
- Winnien Dahlgren
- Yuko Fujiyama
- Zusaan Kali Fasteau
