= Bob Rusch =

American jazz critic, publisher and record producer (1943–2024)

- Born: Robert D. Rusch; April 3, 1943; New York City, U.S.
- Died: January 14, 2024 (aged 80)
- Genre: Jazz
- Occupations: Jazz critic and publisher, record producer
- Labels: Cadence Jazz, CIMP
- Website: cadencebuilding.com

Robert D. Rusch (April 3, 1943 – January 14, 2024) was an American jazz critic and record producer.

== Biography ==
Robert D. Rusch was born in New York City on April 3, 1943. studied clarinet and drums in his youth. During the 1970s, Rusch played drums in workshops with Jaki Byard and Cedar Walton. He wrote for the magazines Down Beat, Jazz Journal and Jazz Forum in the 1970s before founding Cadence Magazine in 1975. He founded two record labels, Cadence Jazz (in 1980) and CIMP (in 1995), and produced or oversaw the release of hundreds of jazz releases; among those musicians he has produced are Bill Dixon, Chet Baker, Glenn Spearman, Ernie Krivda, Ivo Perelman, Noah Howard, Dominic Duval, Steuart Liebig, Cecil Taylor, Fred Hess, Anthony Braxton, Bill Barron, Paul Smoker, Jimmy Bennington, and Steve Swell. He has run North Country Record Distribution, an independent jazz label distributor, since 1983. Rusch has donated his large, indexed collection of jazz periodicals to the Schomburg Center for Research in Black Culture.

Rusch's book, JazzTalk: the Cadence Interviews, was published in 1984. A review at the time by Kevin Whitehead noted that it includes "one of the best discussions of the social realities concerning the creation of new music to have appeared in print," in an interview with the trumpeter Bill Dixon. Whitehead wrote that "Rusch has conducted hundreds of interviews with improvisers" and considered that this collection, including interviews with "drummer Art Blakey, trumpeter Freddie Hubbard, pianist Cecil Taylor, and saxophonists Billy Harper, Paul Quinchette and Von Freeman," among others, includes both valuable insights into jazz history and the thinking of the interviewee, and "some dead weight as well."

Rusch died on January 14, 2024, at the age of 80.

== Sexual abuse ==
From 1965 to 1973, Rusch was a teacher at Woodward School, a private elementary school in the Fort Greene section of Brooklyn. On June 4, 2014, three articles appeared in The Wall Street Journal accusing Rusch of "sexually abusing female students as young as 12 years old during the late 1960s and early 1970s." Rusch was interviewed by the newspaper, and in the articles "Rusch acknowledged that he had sex with multiple young students.... 'I accept involvement in some of the things that went on, not all of them, and to that extent I am embarrassed and remorseful and I have been for the better part of 41 years,' said Mr. Rusch, who was 71 years old. 'I carry a lot of guilt.'"

In 2020, three women filed a lawsuit alleging they were "sexually abused and assaulted" by Rusch.
