= John Blum (pianist) =

American jazz pianist and composer

- Born: April 15, 1968 (age 58); New York City, United States
- Genre: Free jazz
- Occupation: Musician
- Instrument: Piano
- Years active: 1991–present
- Website: johnblum.com

John Blum (born April 15, 1968) is an American jazz pianist and composer.

Blum has performed and/or recorded with Antonio Grippi, Barry Guy, Butch Morris, Chad Taylor, Charles Gayle, Cooper-Moore, Daniel Carter, Darius Jones, David Liebman, David Murray, Denis Charles, Ed Schuller, Gerald Cleaver, Hamid Drake, Han Bennink, Jackson Krall, Jemeel Moondoc, Karen Borca, Marco Eneidi, Marshall Allen, Mat Maneri, Michael Bisio, Peter Brotzman, Tony Scott, Tristan Honsinger, Raphe Malik, Roy Campbell, Jr., Sabir Mateen, Sunny Murray, Sonny Simmons, Sirone, Steve Swell, Susie Ibarra, Warren Smith, Wilber Morris, and William Parker.

== Biography ==
Blum is based in New York City, United States. He studied piano with Cecil Taylor and Borah Bergman, and music and composition with Milford Graves and Bill Dixon. Blum has a BS Degree in Biological Science from Bennington College and a MFA Degree in Jazz Composition and Performance.

His keyboard technique is a jazz hybrid of Cecil Taylor and McCoy Tyner, percussive but with fast right-hand linear structure. Blum plays with forcefulness and rapidity like Conlon Nancarrow's player piano rolls. He is an underground fixture of the downtown music scene in New York, known for his explosive high-voltage pianism, and as a musician who aims for the personal.

In 2024, Blum continues to work as a soloist and group leader, performing throughout the United States, Europe, Canada, and Mexico.

== Discography ==
=== As leader ===
- Naked Mirror (Drimala Records, 2002)
- Astrogeny (Eremite Records, 2006)
- Who begat Eye (Konnex Records, 2009)
- In The Shade of Sun (Ecstatic Peace Records, 2009)
- Duplexity (Relative Pitch Records, 2020)
- Nine Rivers (ESP-Disc, 2023)
- The Recursive Tree (Relative Pitch Records, 2023)
- Deep Space (Astral Spirits Records, 2024)

=== As sideman ===
- Butch Morris Orchestra – Conduction 117 (Jump Arts Records, 2003)
- Sunny Murray – Perles Noires Volume 2 (Tracks 5-7) (Eremite, 2005)
- Steve Swell – Live at the Vision Festival (Not Two, 2007)
- Steve Swell – 5000 Poems (Not Two, 2009)

== Selected reviews ==
- John Barrtett (jazzusa.com) – 2002
- Chris Kelsey (jazztimes.com) – 2005
- Clifford Allen (allaboutjazz.com) – 2006
- Derek Taylor (bagatellan.com) – 2006)
- David Keenahttps://www.netflix.com/browse/genre/83n (volcanictongue.com) – 2006
- Howard Mandel (Downbeat Magazine) – 2008
- Bruce Gallanter (DMG) – 2009
- Tony Porter (Shakenstir) – 2009
- Massimo Ricci (Touching Extremes) – 2010
- Martin Longely (allaboutjazz.com) – 2010
- German Lazaro (Overlook Hotel) – 2011
- Troy Dostert (allaboutjazz.com) – 2020
- Paul Acquaro (The Free Jazz Collective) - 2021
- Mark Corroto (allaboutjazz.com) – 2023
- Nick Metzger (The Free Jazz Collective) – 2024
- Massimo Ricci (The Squid's Ear) – 2024
- S. Victor Aaron (Something Else!) - 2024
- Mike (AMN Reviews) - 2024
