= All the Notes =

Live album by Cecil Taylor
- Released: 2004
- Recorded: February 19, 2000
- Venue: Ted Mann Concert Hall, Minneapolis, MN
- Genre: Free jazz
- Length: 1:14:09
- Label: Cadence Jazz Records; CJR 1169
- Producer: Bob Rusch

All the Notes is a live album by pianist Cecil Taylor. It was recorded at the Ted Mann Concert Hall in Minneapolis, Minnesota in February 2000, and was released in 2004 by Cadence Jazz Records. On the album, Taylor is joined by bassist Dominic Duval, and drummer Jackson Krall.

== Reception ==
Professional ratings
Review scores
Source	Rating
AllMusic	4/5 stars
The Penguin Guide to Jazz	3/4 stars

In a review for AllMusic, Scott Yanow wrote: "the performance consists of three improvisations... that have Taylor in mostly thunderous form, leavened by a few brief lyrical moments. Bassist Dominic Duval and drummer Jackson Krall do their best to keep up with Taylor but there is no doubt who the leader is. Taylor's remarkable technique and endurance are in evidence, as is his ability to build on the most abstract ideas and somehow have it all make musical sense. Taylor's followers will enjoy the music while those whose ears are not open to the pianist's very advanced improvising are advised to explore some of his earlier recordings first"

== Track listing ==
1. "Improvisation I" – 37:04
2. "Improvisation II" – 29:51
3. "Improvisation III" – 7:14

== Personnel ==
- Cecil Taylor – piano, vocals
- Dominic Duval – bass
- Jackson Krall – drums
