= Chris Kelsey =

American musician (born 1961)

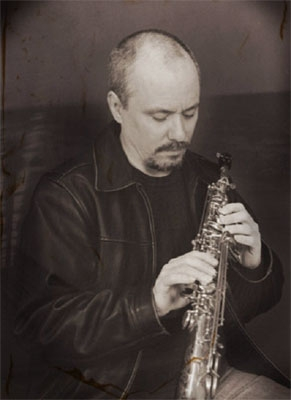
Chris Kelsey.

Chris Kelsey (born June 5, 1961) is an American-born jazz saxophonist, composer, music critic, and novelist. His music draws on bebop, free jazz, free improvisation, funk, and fusion, and is augmented by elements of non-tonal, contemporary classical music. His fiction is inspired by such crime writers as Raymond Chandler, Jim Thompson, and Dashiell Hammett. As a musician, Kelsey has worked almost exclusively as a leader of his own ensembles, usually trios and quartets. From the late 1980s, his principal instrument has been soprano saxophone, though in recent years he has recorded and performed on tenor and alto, as well. Kelsey has recorded nearly twenty albums under his own name, many for the C.I.M.P. label. With rare exceptions, he has recorded and performed his own original compositions. His first novel, Where the Hurt Is, was published in 2018 by Black Rose Writing. As a critic, he has written for leading jazz publications and web sites, including Jazziz, JazzTimes, Cadence, AllMusic, and Jazz.com.

== Early years ==
Kelsey was born in Bangor, Maine, but raised primarily in a succession of small Oklahoma towns. His father, Barry Kelsey – a professional jazz saxophonist himself – was his first teacher and school band director. Beginning in 1974, Kelsey received saxophone instruction from Dr. Jack Sisson, the head of the music department at Central State University (now the University of Central Oklahoma) in Edmond, Oklahoma. Kelsey was an All-State saxophonist as a high schooler in Noble, Oklahoma, before attending the University of Oklahoma and Central State University, where he studied music education and played in various school ensembles. He graduated from Central in 1984 with a bachelor's degree in Music Education. Kelsey began playing professionally in 1979, working in bands with his father. During and immediately following his college days, he played in various rock, jazz, and rhythm & blues bands in the vicinity of Oklahoma City.

== Professional music career ==
Kelsey moved to New York City in late 1986. After a lull of three years – during which he worked at the Metropolitan Museum of Art and contemplated becoming a visual artist – he resumed playing music. His first New York performances came in the early 1990s at bars and performance spaces on the Lower East Side. During this period, Kelsey met guitarist Jack DeSalvo, with whom he would collaborate extensively in coming years.

In 1992, Kelsey formed The Almost Jazz Trio with electric bassist Dom Richards and drummer Edward Ware. The band recorded Stomp Own It, a funk and groove-influenced cassette-only release on Kelsey's own Saxofonis Music label. During this period he played the Knitting Factory (including performing at several of that club's annual summer jazz festivals) and other Downtown NYC venues. In 1996, Kelsey recorded Observations – a duo with trombonist Steve Swell – for the then-new C.I.M.P. label. The next year he recorded The Ingenious Gentleman of the Lower East Side with a trio that included Ware and bassist Dominic Duval, also for C.I.M.P.

After releasing a trio of albums on his own label in 1999, Kelsey essentially stopped playing the saxophone for several years, while he and his wife raised their two small children. During this time, he experimented with computer music, but did not perform or record.

Kelsey returned to music in early 2003. He formed a new trio with bassist Francois Grillot and drummer Jay Rosen, the band's music influenced by the compositional concepts of John Coltrane, Ornette Coleman, and Albert Ayler. The group recorded a series of albums for the C.I.M.P. label, usually with a second horn. In late 2004, they recorded Renewal, with trombonist Swell added. In 2005 the core trio recorded Wishing You Were Here. That same year, Kelsey recorded a solo soprano sax album for Cadence Jazz, Beyond Is and Is Not. Two years later, with trumpeter John Carlson, the group recorded its final two albums for C.I.M.P., The Crookedest Straight Line Vols. 1 & 2. The Kelsey/Grillot/Rosen unit (with Chris DiMeglio on trumpet) recorded once more, in 2009 for Kelsey's own Tzazz Krytyk label. The resultant album, Not Cool (... In Other Words, the Opposite of Paul Desmond), featured a cover of Albert Ayler's “Ghosts”, the first time one of Kelsey's groups would record a composition other than his own. It was also the first time Kelsey would record on tenor and alto sax.

Kelsey renewed his association with guitarist DeSalvo, beginning around 2010. In 2011, DeSalvo's Unseen Rain label released Happy House, a set of interpretations of Ornette Coleman tunes by a quartet comprising Kelsey, trombonist Pat Hall, six-string electric bassist Joe Gallant, and drummer Dean Sharp. The new label also issued Stutches, a long-unreleased early-1990s recording of a trio that included Kelsey, DeSalvo, and percussionist Tom Tedesco; Live at Magnolia’s, a live duo set by Kelsey and DeSalvo recorded in 2012; and Live From Nowhere, a set by a modal-oriented quintet, 1UP1DOWN (Gallant, DeSalvo, keyboardist Lewis Porter, and drummer Alan Lerner). In 2013, Kelsey published a book of original compositions, The Attack of the Contrafact. In 2015, he released a pair of duo albums: Duets: NYC/Woodstock with the guitarist Dom Minasi, and Free: Kelsey/Porter Duo Plays Ornette, Vol. 1 with Porter. Plays Ornette, Vol. 2 was released in 2017.

== Fiction writing ==
In 2018, Black Rose Writing published Kelsey's first novel, Where the Hurt Is, a historical mystery set in 1965, that tells the story of a race-based murder in a small all-white Oklahoma town and the efforts of the local police chief, Emmett Hardy, to solve the crime. The book was named Fiction Book of the Year by the PenCraft Awards and received positive reviews by Midwest Book Review, AuthorsReading.com, and BestThrillers.com. On the book's cover, author Anne Hillerman called it: "Poignant and funny, studded with characters who haunt your imagination long after you've read the final page."

== Journalism ==
Kelsey began writing jazz criticism in 1994. He covered the first Improvisers Collective Festival (later known as the Vision Festival) for the California-based Jazz Now! magazine, and began writing CD reviews for Cadence Magazine. He began contributing to Jazziz magazine in 1995, writing reviews and profiles of such then-obscure Downtown musicians as William Parker, Charles Gayle, and Myra Melford. He also began writing for the print edition of The All Music Guide to Jazz and MusicHound Jazz. Kelsey would go on to write for a number of publications and web sites, including JazzTimes, Ms., CDNow, and Jazz.com, among others. He was also an active blogger for a time. Since the demise of Jazz.com in 2010 he has written only sporadically.

== What I Say ==
In Summer 2011, Kelsey formed What I Say, a quintet dedicated to exploring the 1970s music of Miles Davis. The group includes Gallant, Sharp, guitarists DeSalvo and Rolf Sturm, and Kelsey on soprano sax and - for the first time - straight alto sax. The band went into the studio in July 2011. Kelsey mixed and mastered the album himself in the Spring 2013. The album What I Say: The Electric Miles Project was released in Summer 2013 to some of the best reviews of Kelsey's career. The album won the 2014 Independent Music Award for Best Tribute Album.

== Personal life ==
Kelsey married Lisa Kocaurek in 1993. The couple have two children. Since 2012, Kelsey has been the Director of Instrumental Music at Trinity-Pawling School in Pawling, NY.
