= In Black and White =

In Black and White may refer to:

- In Black and White (short story collection), a collection of stories by Rudyard Kipling
- In Black and White: The Untold Story of Joe Louis and Jesse Owens, a sports book by Donald McRae
- In Black and White (Mustard Plug album)
- In Black and White (Trio X album)
- ...In Black and White, a 1982 album by Barbara Mandrell
- In Black and White, an album by Jenny Burton
- "In Black and White", a song by Sonata Arctica from the album Unia
