= Spirit Music =

Live album by Marilyn Crispell
- Released: 1983
- Recorded: May 15, 1981, and January 13, 1982
- Venue: New York University and Soundscape, New York City
- Genre: Free Jazz
- Label: Cadence Jazz Records; CJR 1015
- Producer: Bob Rusch

Spirit Music is a live album by pianist Marilyn Crispell. It was recorded at New York University and Soundscape in New York City in May 1981 and January 1982, and was released in 1983 by Cadence Jazz Records. On the album, Crispell is joined by violinist Billy Bang, guitarist Wes Brown, and drummer John Betsch.

== Reception ==
Professional ratings
Review scores
Source	Rating
AllMusic	5/5 stars
The Penguin Guide to Jazz	3/4 stars

In a review for AllMusic, Scott Yanow wrote: "Marilyn Crispell is one of the most significant piano voices of the avant-garde... This Cadence release... finds her leading her own trio... On one of the four lengthy improvisations heard on this set, guitarist Wes Brown makes the band a quartet. These stirring performances serve as a fine introduction to the passionate music of Marilyn Crispell."

The authors of the Penguin Guide to Jazz Recordings stated: "'Spirit Music' is dedicated to Coltrane and represents some sort of coming-to-terms with her 'overwhelming' introduction to A Love Supreme. It is a powerful piece, well recorded... and dominates an album of long tracks. Wes Brown's guitar fits in surprisingly well, seldom clashing with Bang's furiously scrabbled violin."

Tom Moon, in his book 1,000 Recordings to Hear Before You Die, listed Spirit Music as a suggested follow-up to Cecil Taylor's Silent Tongues.

== Track listing ==
All compositions by Marilyn Crispell.

1. "Rounds" – 9:00
2. "For Atsuko" – 11:11
3. "Stoic" – 12:55
4. "Spirit Music" – 12:21
- Tracks 1–3 recorded on January 13, 1982, at Soundscape in New York City. Track 4 recorded on May 15, 1981, at New York University in New York City.

== Personnel ==
- Marilyn Crispell – piano
- Billy Bang – violin
- Wes Brown – guitar (track 4)
- John Betsch – drums
