= Remembrance (Joe McPhee album) =

Live album by Joe McPhee, Raymond Boni, Michael Bisio and Paul Harding
- Released: 2005
- Recorded: October 27, 2001 at the Brechemin Auditorium of the University of Washington, Seattle, as part of the 2001 Earshot Jazz Festival
- Genre: Jazz
- Length: 53:58
- Label: CjR CjR-5
- Producer: Craig Johnson and Joe McPhee

Joe McPhee chronology
In Black and White (1999-2001)	Remembrance (2005)	Journey (2002)

Remembrance is a live album of performed by multi-instrumentalist Joe McPhee recorded in 2001 at the Earshot Jazz Festival in Seattle and first released on the CjR label in 2005.

== Reception ==
Professional ratings
Review scores
Source	Rating
Allmusic	4/5 stars

Allmusic reviewer Steve Loewy states "the gods were smiling, and Joe McPhee, Michael Bisio, Raymond Boni, and Paul Harding were caught in concert in tip-top shape, revealing the power of sensitive, quality blowing". On All About Jazz Robert Iannapollo called the album "a remarkable performance". in JazzTimes Marc Masters wrote "Remembrance may not match the accomplishments of Trio-X, but its unique feel is another solid notch on McPhee's artistic belt."

== Track listing ==
All compositions by Joe McPhee except as indicated

1. "Remembrance (Opening)" - 22:57
2. "This Is Where I Live" (Joe McPhee, Paul Harding) - 6:29
3. "In the End There Is Peace" (Michael Bisio) - 8:15
4. "Remembrance (Closing)" - 16:17

== Personnel ==
- Joe McPhee - soprano saxophone, pocket trumpet
- Raymond Boni - electric guitar
- Michael Bisio - bass
- Paul Harding - narration (track 2)
