= Jane Wang (composer and musician) =

Jane Wang is a composer, music improvisor, and plays the double bass, toy piano, piano, cello, and various other musical instruments.

Wang participated in the ~chromatik d zabu.tmp vs. Vox Novus project and is a member of CDZ. She was selected for the 60x60 project multiple times. Jane Wang composed and performed music for Hanne Tierney’s How Wang-Fo Was Saved and Ms. Tierney's Man, the Flower of All Flesh The design team, including Jane Wang, were nominated for the 2005 Henry Hewes Design Award. Jane Wang composed and performed solo bass pieces for Hanne Tierney including in 2019, 18 Stanzas Sung to a Tatar Whistle at FiveMyles Performances have been presented at the Wanas Exhibition in Sweden, the International Festival of Puppet Theatre, BAM Next Wave Festival, the Sculpture Center and FiveMyles Gallery in New York City, the Beograd International Theatre Festival in Yugoslavia, and Ms. Tierney's Obie-award-winning Salome (with Sabir Mateen) at five myles and the International Festival of Puppet Theatre. She composed the music for Danny Swain's 3000 Miles to Blue and Renita Martin's Five Bottles In A Six Pack at The Theater Offensive (Boston), Cherry Lane Theatre (NYC) and Jump-Start (San Antonio).

In 2009, Wang began her collaboration with choreographer Nathan Andary starting with Intervals which they created and performed as a duo at Boston University, Clarice Smith Performing Arts Center and the John F. Kennedy Center for the Performing Arts, and including Going Viral at Dance Place, in 2014, The Weight of Square at the Somerville Dancing in the Streets Festival and in 2017, Or... at Judson Church in NYC and a showing at the 2017 International Dance Day Festival in Lebanon.

In 2013, Wang was nominated for a Drama Desk Award Outstanding Music in a Play - Hanne Tierney's Strange Tales of Liaozhai at HERE Arts Center.

Three of her miniature compositions were featured in the Fifteen Minutes of Fame series in 2025 and 2026 performed by Thomas Piercy (hichiriki) with Lish Lindsey (contrabass flute), Kari Johnson Barroso (solo piano) and Alyssa Reit (solo lever harp) respectively.

== Discography ==
- "And Then You Heard Tales" - Ryo Hashizume - Hao Records 428 - 1997
- "In A Stranger’s Hand" - Ryo Hashizume - Hao Records 429 - 1998
- "Somewhere In The Universe" - Takeshi Asai - Hao Records 430 - 1999
- "Invisible" - Osamu Moriyama - Hao Records 431 - 2000
- "The Sabir Mateen Quartet: Other Places Other Spaces" - 2008 Nu Bop Records CD 05
- "Numero Uno" - 60x60 (2006-2007) - Vox Novus
- "Vol XXIV - From The Outskirts of The Milky Way" - 2007 CDZ
- "Vol XXII - Funky Industrial Cartoons" - 2006 CDZ
- "Vol XVIII - The New Voice of Chromatic Disgruntlement" - 2006 CDZ and Vox Novus
- "First Time Out - Waterfront Park String Band" - 2004
- "More Than A Dream - Soul Station Live in Baltimore" - 2004
- "Legend of the Sea" - SOLARIS - Luna Records - 2003
- "Bethlehem COUNTERPOINT" - Aardvark Jazz Orchestra - 2002 - Aardmuse Recordings CD102
- Sabir Mateen: Secrets of When - Bleu Regard CT 1961 - 2001
- "Twoubadou Sek" - Gifrants - Gaeta Records - 2001
- "Invention Box" - Binary System - Atavistic ALP127CD - 2001
- "Vattel Cherry’s bassrespänse" 2001 - Owlsong Records - OWL2001-
- "The Already and The Not Yet" - James Falzone - 2000
- "Live on Boston Radio WGBH: Eric In the Evening" - Who She Be - promo CD - 1999
- "Slow Dance At The Asylum" - Molly Flannery Quintet - 1999
- "Serenade by Gifrants" - Gifrants - Gaeta Records 3323 - 1996
- "Laundry for the Nineties" - The Lydian People's Front - Lydian1 - 1996
