= The Zookeeper's House =

Studio album by Jemeel Moondoc
- Released: 2014
- Recorded: October 26, 2013
- Studio: Park West, Brooklyn
- Genre: Jazz
- Length: 50:42
- Label: Relative Pitch
- Producer: Jemeel Moondoc, Kevin Reilly, Mike Panico

Jemeel Moondoc chronology
Yellow Back Radio Breakdown (2013)	The Zookeeper's House (2014)	Cosmic Nickelodeon (2016)

The Zookeeper's House is an album by American jazz saxophonist Jemeel Moondoc, which was recorded in 2013 and released on Relative Pitch Records. It was his first album leading a full band in over a decade.

== Music ==
Moondoc plays the ballad "For the Love of Cindy" with only the rhythm section composed of bassist Hilliard Greene and drummer Newman Taylor Baker. On the title track and "One for Monk and Coltrane" they are joined by pianist Matthew Shipp. On "Little Blue Elvira" and Alice Coltrane's classic "Ptah, the El Daoud" the band is a quintet with a three-horn front line featuring trumpeter Roy Campbell, in his final recorded appearance and to whom the album is dedicated, and trombonist Steve Swell, who played before with Moondoc on the record Swimming in a Galaxy of Goodwill and Sorrow, by Swell's band Fire Into Music.

== Reception ==
Professional ratings
Review scores
Source	Rating
Down Beat	3.5/5 stars

The Down Beat review by Josef Woodard states "The new five-track set, with different groupings and musical angles, captures a distinctly live vibrancy and in-the-moment vulnerability in the studio."

Phil Freeman of Burning Ambulance placed the album at #1 on the Best Jazz of 2014 list, and wrote: "The Zookeeper's House is easily one of Jemeel Moondoc's best albums, and a terrific reminder of his too-often-overlooked genius."

Writing for The Quietus, Stewart Smith remarked: "A superb album... combining strong melodies and rhythms with advanced thought. Joined by a first-rate band... Moondoc offers several fine new compositions and a terrific version of Alice Coltrane's 'Ptah the El Daoud'."

The Morning Star's Chris Searle called the recording "a truly burning album," and noted that, on "Ptah, the El Daoud," "Moondoc plays with a felicitous fluency, Swell growls out his message and the marvellous Campbell flies with the pitch of his notes."

== Track listing ==
All compositions by Jemeel Moondoc except as indicated

1. "The Zookeeper's House" - 9:11
2. "Little Blue Elvira" - 9:43
3. "Ptah, the El Daoud" (Alice Coltrane) - 10:48
4. "One for Monk and Trane" - 12:42
5. "For the Love of Cindy" - 8:18

== Personnel ==
- Jemeel Moondoc - alto sax
- Matthew Shipp - piano on 1 & 4
- Roy Campbell - trumpet on 2 & 3
- Steve Swell - trombone on 2 & 3
- Hilliard Greene - bass
- Newman Taylor Baker - drums
