= David Haney =

- Born: 1955 (age 70–71); Fresno, California, U.S.
- Genres: Jazz
- Occupations: Musician, magazine publisher
- Instrument: Piano
- Labels: Cadence, CIMP, SLAM PRODUCTIONS, Parma Recordings, Cadence Media, Big Round Records, ZZZ

David Haney (born 1955) is an American jazz pianist and publisher of Cadence magazine.

== Career ==
As an infant, Haney's family moved from Fresno, California, to Calgary, Alberta. He began piano studies at the age of nine, and started playing guitar when he was fifteen. He attended Sacramento City College and the University of New Orleans. At Clark College in Vancouver, Washington, he studied music theory and took private lessons with jazz pianist Eddie Weid. From 1980 to 1985 he studied privately with Czech-American composer Tomáš Svoboda.

His works were performed twice at the Berg Swann Auditorium in Portland, in 1980 and 1982, and at Linfield College in McMinnville, Oregon in 1982. He was commissioned in 1984 to provide the music for a benefit fundraiser for the Oregon Ballet Theatre, which included the Dance Theatre of Harlem. He received commissions from private individuals and recorded music for film through Alberta Filmworks in 1988. From 1980 to 1990, he wrote over 100 liturgical works. In 1997, he changed his focus to performing rather than composing; his first tour was with Roswell Rudd in Canada that year, then with Julian Priester in 1998. In 1999, he played at Yoshi's in Oakland, California with John Tchicai. In 2000, he performed solo at the Pacific Rim Chamber Festival in Tofino, Canada and the Calgary International Jazz Festival. He played in Portland in 2001 with Bud Shank and again with Julian Priester and Obo Addy.

On 26 September 2001 he played a solo concert six blocks from ground zero of the September 11 attacks on the World Trade Center. He has performed at The Knitting Factory and in a duo concert with Jørgen Munkeby at BlaJazz in Oslo, Norway. In 2002, he formed a Herbie Nichols tribute trio that performed concerts and on radio station KMHD in Portland and KJEX in Seattle, Washington. Later that year he played at The Knitting Factory with Andrew Cyrille and toured extensively with Argentine musicians Diego Chamy and Jorge Hernaez, paid in part by the U.S. State Departments of Argentina and Chile.

His trio was the headline group at the Second International Festival de Jazz de Valparaiso in Chile and several concerts and master classes throughout Argentina. He played a solo concert at Porgy and Bess in Vienna, Austria. In January 2004, Haney toured with Julian Priester, playing at The Jazz Gallery in New York and concerts in France, Belgium, and Germany.

Bob Rusch, founder and publisher of Cadence magazine, announced in 2011 that Haney would take over the magazine in 2012. Haney also publishes The Liturgy Planner to help churches choose music for their services.

Haney has collaborated with Julian Priester, Buell Neidlinger, John Tchicai, Han Bennink, Mat Marucci and Wilbert de Joode and recorded on the Cadence and CIMP labels.

== Discography ==
- Caramel Topped Terrier (Cadence Jazz), 2001)
- For Sale: Five Million Cash (Cadence, 2004) duo with Julian Priester
- Arctic Radio (Arctic, 1997)
- Blues Royale (CIMP], 2007)
- Clandestine (CIMP, 2008)
- Conspiracy A Go Go (CIMP, 2008)
- Blues Royale (CIMP, 2008) with Adam Lane, Mike Biseo
- Blue Flint Girl (CIMP, 2009)
- Live at Yoshi's (Cadence, 2010) with John Tchicai
- Solo (CIMP, 2015)
- Avenue of the Americas (CIMP, 2016)
- Live from Jazz Central (Cadence, 2016)
- Selling It Like It Is (Cadence, 2016)
- Stix & Stones: Piano & Drum Duets (Slam, 2016)
- Q Sessions (Slam, 2017)
- Siege of Misarata (CIMP, 2017)
- Angel Foot Shuffle (Cadence, 2015)
- Birth of a City (Big Round Records - Parma Recordings, 2018)
- Circadian World Clock (Big Round Records - Parma Recordings, 2018)
- Live at Earshot (Cadence Media, 2022)
