= Michael Vatcher =

American jazz percussionist

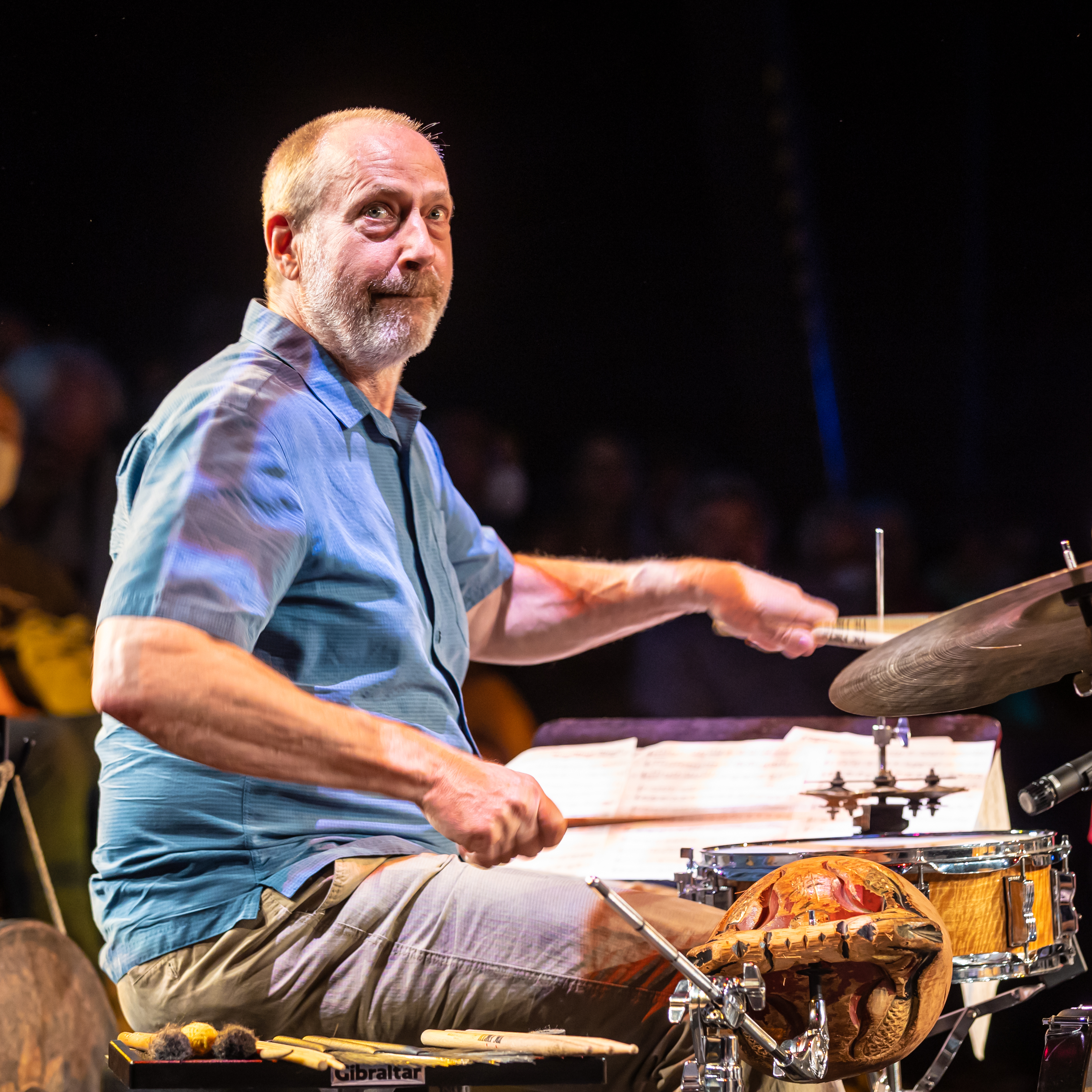
Michael Vatcher at the Moers Festival 2022

Michael Vatcher (born 1954) is an American jazz percussionist. He was a longtime resident of the Netherlands.

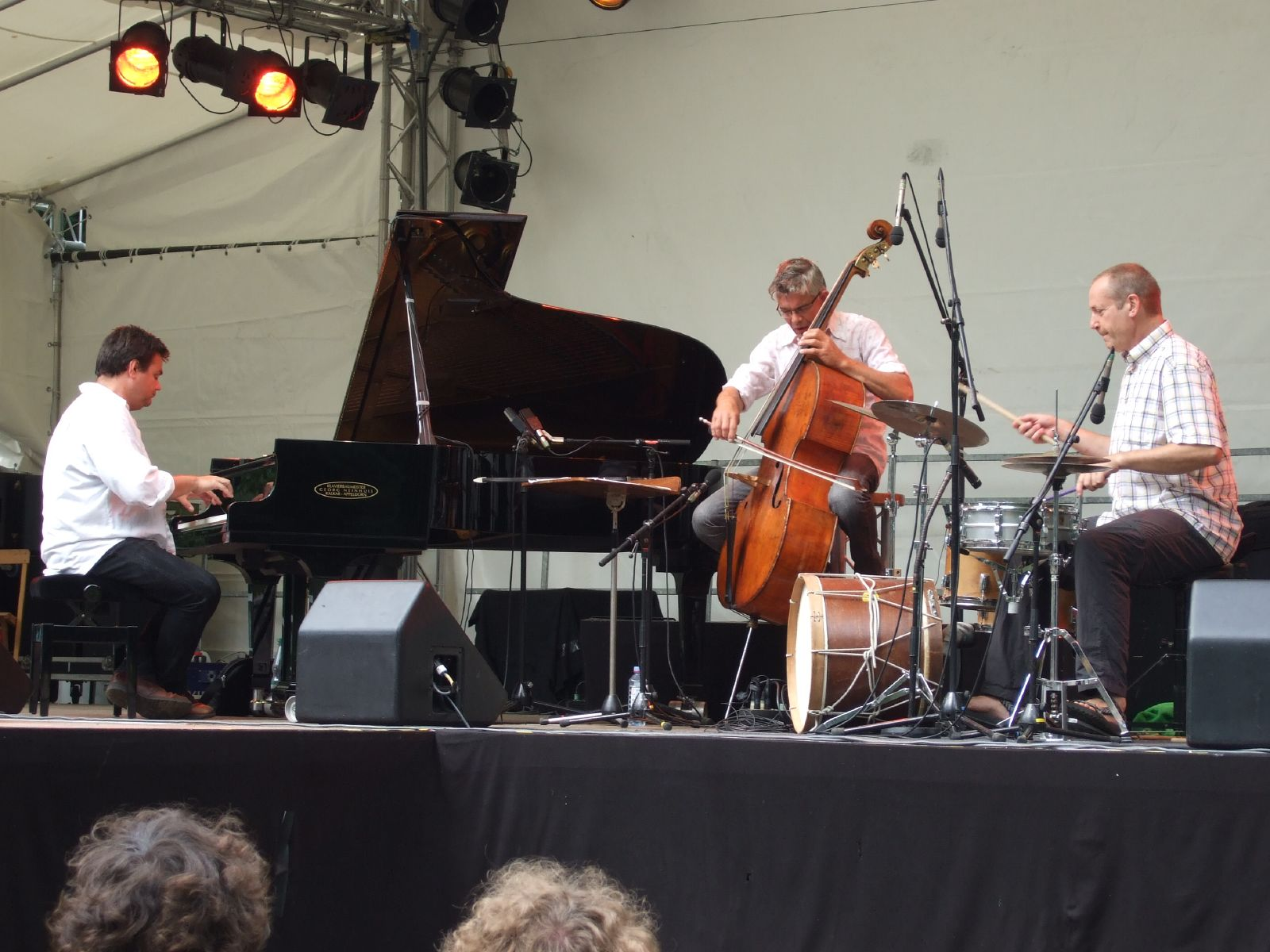
Michael Vatcher (right) performing in the trio with Braam and DeJoode at music festival OffsideOpen in 2007

Vatcher grew up in California and as a child played the vibraphone and snare drum. He worked for a long time with Michael Moore, John Handy, and Terry Gibbs.

In 1981 he moved to Amsterdam where he was active in many groups like Tristan Honsinger's Sextet, the Maarten Altena Ensemble, The Ex, Roof (with Phil Milton, Tom Cora, and Luc Ex), Available Jelly, and in a trio with Michiel Braaam and Wilbert de Joode. He also actively performed alongside Van Dyke Parks, John Zorn, Simon Nabatov, Georg Gräwe, Hans Lüdemann, and Ernst Reijseger. In 2012 worked with Magnus Broo, Ken Vandermark, and Steve Swell. Vatcher also worked as a "sideman" on about 50 albums.

Alongside his music, he worked regularly as an accompanist for the School for New Dance Development in Amsterdam and has a musical relationship with dancers Katie Duck and Eileen Standley.
