= Live @ the Vision Festival =

Live album by Steve Swell
- Released: 2007
- Recorded: June 17, 2006
- Venue: Angel Orensanz Center, New York City
- Genre: Jazz
- Length: 46:43
- Label: Not Two
- Producer: Marek Winiarski

Steve Swell chronology
Swimming in a Galaxy of Goodwill and Sorrow (2007)	Live @ the Vision Festival (2007)	News from the Mystic Auricle (2008)

Live @ the Vision Festival is an album by American jazz trombonist Steve Swell, which was recorded at the 2006 Vision Festival and released on the Polish Not Two label. It was the third release by Slammin' the Infinite, this time a quintet with guest pianist John Blum.

== Reception ==
Professional ratings
Review scores
Source	Rating
AllMusic	4/5 stars
The Penguin Guide to Jazz	3/4 stars

In his review for AllMusic, Michael G. Nastos states "Swell and his quintet dubbed 'Slammin' the Infinite' do indeed push the envelope, play arresting free-based music, and decompose standard jazz nomenclature while also paying tribute to the pioneering heroes of the genre."

The Penguin Guide to Jazz says "'Three large slabs the sound give the disc an undifferentiated feel, though the closing threnody for Frank Lowe suddenly seems to acquire coherence."

In a double review for All About Jazz, John Sharpe notes that "Less than perfect sound is the only drawback to an otherwise splendid disc... But the passion, power and high octane exuberance of this band nonetheless makes for required listening."

== Track listing ==
All compositions by Steve Swell

1. "Improv / Box Set" - 16:11
2. "For Grachan" - 15:37
3. "Patient Explorer / For Frank Lowe" - 14:55

== Personnel ==
- Steve Swell - trombone
- Sabir Mateen - alto sax, tenor sax, clarinet, flute
- Matthew Heyner - bass
- Klaus Kugel - drums
- John Blum - piano
