= News from the Mystic Auricle =

Studio album by Steve Swell
- Released: 2008
- Recorded: February 3, 2007
- Studio: Park West, New York City
- Genre: Jazz
- Length: 69:39
- Label: Not Two

Steve Swell chronology
Live @ the Vision Festival (2007)	News from the Mystic Auricle (2008)	Magical Listening Hour (2009)

News from the Mystic Auricle is an album by American jazz trombonist Steve Swell, which was recorded in 2007 and released on the Polish Not Two label. He presents a new band called Rivers of Sound Ensemble, extending Slammin' the Infinite with trumpeter Roy Campbell and Hilliard Greene instead of Matthew Heyner on bass.

== Reception ==
The All About Jazz review by Jeff Stockton notes that "With the horns coming together and cleaving apart in a continuous seamless flow and Greene's strings squealing under his bow, it's Klaus Kugel's tireless drumming that tethers Campbell, Swell and Mateen to the ground." In another review for All About Jazz John Sharpe states "These guys are masters of this art and close listening reveals a wealth of incidental detail, particularly from the rhythmic axis of Kugel and Greene, which illuminates this highly recommended outing."

== Track listing ==
All compositions by Campbell / Mateen / Swell / Greene / Kugel

1. "Journey to Omphalos" - 27:13
2. "Healix" - 19:35
3. "News From the Mystic Auricle" - 22:51

== Personnel ==
- Roy Campbell - trumpet, flugelhorn
- Sabir Mateen - alto sax, tenor sax, clarinet, flute
- Steve Swell - trombone
- Hilliard Greene - bass
- Klaus Kugel - drums
