= Journey (Trio X album) =

Studio album by Trio X
- Released: 2003
- Recorded: February 6 & 7, 2002 at The Spirit Room in Rossie, New York.
- Genre: Jazz
- Length: 71:00
- Label: CIMP CIMP 283
- Producer: Bob Rusch

Joe McPhee chronology
Remembrance (2001)	Journey (2003)	Tales Out of Time (2002)

Journey is an album performed by multi-instrumentalist Joe McPhee's Trio X recorded in 2002 and first released on the CIMP label.

== Reception ==
Professional ratings
Review scores
Source	Rating
Allmusic	4/5 stars
The Penguin Guide to Jazz Recordings	3/4 stars

Allmusic reviewer Steve Loewy states "you could not ask for a more accomplished, in-synch set of musical partners. There is a near-perfect synergy among them, so much so that they seem to anticipate each other's every move, almost like dancers who instinctively follow one another's steps". On All About Jazz Florence Wetzel wrote "although one can listen to Journey with half an ear, its greatest rewards come from attention and complete immersion. Certainly Trio-X is worth the effort".

== Track listing ==
All compositions by Joe McPhee, Dominic Duval and Jay Rosen

1. "Episode 1: That Was/This Is" - 6:10
2. "Episode 2: Journey" - 11:58
3. "Episode 3: Jaywalkin'" - 9:19
4. "Episode 4: Blue Moves" - 6:56
5. "Episode 5: Autograph" - 12:18
6. "Episode 6: Everything In Nothing Flat" - 6:02
7. "Episode 7: For Charles Moffett" - 3:04
8. "Episode 8: Rossie 2 Step" - 5:16
9. "Episode 9: Albert's Alto" - 4:40
10. "Episode 10: Amazing Grace" - 4:54

== Personnel ==
- Joe McPhee - alto saxophone, tenor saxophone
- Dominic Duval - bass
- Jay Rosen - drums
