= Observations (album) =

Studio album by Steve Swell & Chris Kelsey
- Released: 1996
- Recorded: February 16 & 17, 1996
- Studio: The Spirit Room, Rossie, New York
- Genre: Jazz
- Length: 66:01
- Label: CIMP
- Producer: Bob Rusch

Steve Swell chronology
Observations (1996)	Out and About (1996)

Observations is the debut album by the American jazz trombonist Steve Swell and saxophonist Chris Kelsey, recorded in 1996 and released on CIMP.

== Reception ==
Professional ratings
Review scores
Source	Rating
AllMusic	4/5 stars
The Penguin Guide to Jazz	3.5/4 stars

In his review for AllMusic, Scott Yanow states: "Both Swell and Kelsey (who possess fairly original sounds) are not shy to utilize space nor to express themselves and their colorful interplay is the main reason to acquire this continually interesting avant-garde disc."

The Penguin Guide to Jazz notes that "the duo with Kelsey is a long-standing rehearsal partnership, and they read each other's moves with brilliant empathy."

== Track listing ==
All compositions by Chris Kelsey & Steve Swell

1. "The History of Jazz is Replete with Anomalies" - 8:59
2. "Charlie Parker Did Not Want To Be Worshipped Like a God" - 12:22
3. "The Last Note Has Yet to Be Spoken" - 6:51
4. "Sedition Build Tradition" - 9:15
5. "Bill Clinton Digs Stan Getz" - 8:26
6. "The Best Things in Jazz Are Free" - 9:03
7. "Cage Was Occasionally Wrong" - 7:31
8. "An Afterthought" - 3:34

== Personnel ==
- Steve Swell - trombone
- Chris Kelsey - soprano sax
