= Markus Burger =

German pianist and educator

- Born: Wittlich, Rhineland-Palatinate, Germany
- Origin: Cologne, North Rhine-Westphalia, Germany
- Genres: Jazz, new-age, chamber
- Occupations: Musician, composer, music educator, record producer
- Instrument: Piano
- Years active: 1980–present
- Labels: Challenge Records, Jazzline Records, Cadence Jazz, Edition Hänssler
- Website: markusburger.com

Markus Burger is a German pianist, composer, and music educator. Since 2001, he has lived in California, where he works at Fullerton College and San Diego University.

== Early life and education ==
Burger began playing piano at age six. He studied at the Folkwang University of the Arts in Essen, Germany, under the guidance of Peter Herborn, John Taylor, Simon Nabatov, and Uli Beckerhoff. He later graduated with a Master in Performing Arts. He also studied at the Banff Centre in Alberta, Canada in 1993, where he met Kenny Wheeler.

== Career ==
Burger has performed as a soloist and a collaborator on jazz and classical music albums. In 2016, Challenge Records released an album titled Accidental Tourists, featuring Burger with Kenny Wheeler, Norma Winstone, Stefan Lottermann, Jan von Klewitz, Felix Astor, and Martin Gjakonovski. This album was part of The Banff Sessions - A Tribute to Kenny Wheeler.

Burger founded the trio Accidental Tourists, which was recorded for Challenge Records. In 2005 he founded the North Atlantic Jazz Alliance. His collaboration with saxophonist Jan von Klewitz, under the name Spiritual Standards, resulted in five album releases on Jazzline and Challenge Records, featuring elements of jazz and classical music.

=== Teaching ===
Burger is a professor at Fullerton College, where he also serves as the director of the Music Technology Studies program. He has also worked as an adjunct professor of music entrepreneurship, piano, and composition at San Diego State University (SDSU).

== Awards and recognitions ==
- In 1993, Burger was a finalist at the Martial Solal Competition in Paris.
- In 1997, he was a finalist at the Jazz Composers Composition Competition in Monaco.
- In 2000, he received the Bach Prize from the city of Erfurt and performed at the Bach festival in Leipzig and Arnstadt.
- In 2019, Austrian piano manufacturer Bösendorfer recognized Burger as one of its featured pianists.
- In 2020, Burger won the Culture Prize of his home county, Bernkastel-Wittlich.

== Discography ==
- 1996: Fishing for Compliments – Septer Bourbon
- 1999: Spiritual Standards – with Jan von Klewitz
- 2000: Spiritual Standards [Secunda] – with Jan von Klewitz
- 2001: The Smile of the Honeycakehorse – Septer Bourbon
- 2002: Ultreya
- 2004: Genesis – Markus Burger, John Tchicai, Matt Marucci (Cadence Jazz Records)
- 2005: Inside.Outside – with Jan von Klewitz
- 2006: NAJA – North Atlantic Jazz Alliance
- 2007: Tertia – with Jan von Klewitz
- 2007: Vesprae – Ensemble Katharsis
- 2008: Quarta - Spiritual Standards from the New World – with Jan von Klewitz
- 2012: Accidental Tourists: The L.A. Sessions – Markus Burger (piano), Joe LaBarbera (drums), Bob Magnusson (bass) (Challenge Records)
- 2016: Accidental Tourists: The Banff Sessions – Markus Burger (piano), Kenny Wheeler (trumpet), Jan von Klewitz (saxophonist), Norma Winstone (vocals) (Challenge Records)
- 2018: Spiritual Standards Quinta, Songs inspired by Martin Luther (Challenge Records)
- 2019: Accidental Tourists: The Alaska Sessions – Markus Burger (piano), Bob Magnusson (bass), Peter Erskine (drums) (Challenge Records)
- 2022: The Vienna Sessions – Markus Burger (solo piano) (Challenge Records)

== General and cited references ==
- Christoph Spendel, Tastenwelt, March 2022, pp. 12, 13, 16–19.
- Ilse Rosenschild, Trierischer Volksfreund, June 28, 2022.
