= Out and About (Steve Swell album) =

Studio album by Steve Swell
- Released: 1996
- Recorded: June 14 & 15, 1996
- Studio: The Spirit Room, Rossie, New York
- Genre: Jazz
- Length: 73:51
- Label: CIMP
- Producer: Bob Rusch

Steve Swell chronology
Observations (1996)	Out and About (1996)	Moons of Jupiter (1997)

Out and About is an album by American jazz trombonist Steve Swell featuring Roswell Rudd, which was recorded in 1996 and released on CIMP.

== Reception ==
Professional ratings
Review scores
Source	Rating
The Penguin Guide to Jazz	3.5/4 stars

The Penguin Guide to Jazz notes that "Swell's tone has a raucous, overheated timbre when he warms up, and set beside Rudd's more constricted delivery, the results are more reminiscent of a couple of old Dixieland tailgaters going at it than anything 'avant-garde'."

== Track listing ==
All compositions by Steve Swell

1. "Fruition" - 8:36
2. "Moves" - 7:45
3. "Out and About" - 11:16
4. "Start Up" - 9:01
5. "Walking the Dog" - 12:50
6. "A Painting" - 12:14
7. "Diesel Dots (for Ryan & Kelcey)" - 12:09

== Personnel ==
- Steve Swell - trombone
- Roswell Rudd - trombone
- Ken Filiano - bass
- Lou Grassi - drums
