= Secrets of When =

Studio album by Sabir Mateen
- Released: 2001
- Recorded: May 31, 2001
- Studio: Seltzer Sound, New York City
- Genre: Jazz
- Length: 64:48
- Label: Bleu Regard
- Producer: Michel Dorbon

Sabir Mateen chronology
Sun Xing (2001)	Secrets of When (2001)	Brothers Together (2002)

Secrets of When is an album by American jazz multi-instrumentalist Sabir Mateen, which was recorded in 2001 and released on the French Bleu Regard label.

== Reception ==
Professional ratings
Review scores
Source	Rating
AllMusic	4/5 stars
The Penguin Guide to Jazz	3.5/4 stars

In his review for AllMusic, Thom Jurek states "The sense of aesthetic and dynamic employed by this band is startling in many cases, as the rich dimensional ambiences pursued in Mateen's compositions invite not only free improvisation but instrumental crosstalk from the very insides of the various players' instruments."

The Penguin Guide to Jazz describes the album as "'a huge step forward musically" and notes "Malik is the ideal front-line partner, and together the group carve out lines that are as empathetic and as fiercely logical as those Coleman and Cherry were making in the '50s."

== Track listing ==
All compositions by Sabir Mateen

1. "Shattered Chamber" – 17:09
2. "Our Community" – 5:04
3. "Secrets of When" – 12:53
4. "Inner Conversations" – 12:42
5. "SouthEast Winds at 12" – 11:13
6. "Prayers" – 5:19

== Personnel ==
- Sabir Mateen – alto sax, tenor sax, clarinet, alto clarinet, flute, vocals
- Raphe Malik – trumpet, vocals
- Jane Wang – bass, cello, vocals
- Ravish Momin – drums, percussion, tablas, talking drum, vocals
- Naoko Ono – piano, vocals
