= Divine Mad Love =

Studio album by Sabir Mateen
- Released: 1998
- Recorded: February 2, 1997
- Studio: PBS Studios, Westwood, Massachusetts
- Genre: Jazz
- Length: 60:30
- Label: Eremite
- Producer: Michael Ehlers

Sabir Mateen chronology
Gettin' Away with Murder (1997)	Divine Mad Love (1998)	We Are Not At The Opera (1999)

Divine Mad Love is an album by American jazz multi-instrumentalist Sabir Mateen, which was recorded in 1997 and released on the Eremite label.

== Reception ==
Professional ratings
Review scores
Source	Rating
The Penguin Guide to Jazz	2.5/4 stars

The Penguin Guide to Jazz says "Very much a group effort, with solo spots for both bassist and drummer, this seems too consciously designed to show off Mateen's not yet developed multi-instrumentalist."

The JazzTimes review by Amiri Baraka states "Full of energy and desire, without the wholeness or interior rationale of clear, riveting aesthetic cohesion."

== Track listing ==
1. "Glory & Prause to the Most High" – 6:32
2. "Checking in with Yourself" – 18:55
3. "Conversation/Lunch before Departure" – 4:51
4. "Running into the Truth (after Chasing a Lie)" – 9:57
5. "Illuminations Flute" – 5:51
6. "Divine Mad Love" – 8:27
7. "Illuminations Bass" – 1:25
8. "Illuminations Drums" – 2:13
9. "WhyDidJaDolt?" – 2:19

== Personnel ==
- Laurence Cook – percussion
- Sabir Mateen – alto sax, tenor sax, clarinet, flute
- John Voigt – bass, vocals
