= Tales Out of Time =

Studio album by Peter Brötzmann, Joe McPhee, Kent Kessler and Michael Zerang
- Released: 2004
- Recorded: June 19, 2002
- Studio: AirWave Studios, Chicago IL.
- Genre: Jazz
- Length: 56:48
- Label: HatHut hatOLOGY 589
- Producer: Pia & Werner X. Uehlinger

Joe McPhee chronology
| Journey (2002) | Tales Out of Time (2004) | Between (2002) |

Peter Brötzmann chronology
| Petroglyphs (2002) | Tales Out of Time (2002) | Images (2002) |

Tales Out of Time is an album by Peter Brötzmann, Joe McPhee, Kent Kessler and Michael Zerang recorded in 2002 and released on the Swiss HatHut label in 2004.

== Reception ==
Professional ratings
Review scores
| Source | Rating |
|---|---|
| Allmusic | 4/5 stars |
| The Penguin Guide to Jazz Recordings | 3.5/4 stars |
| Tom Hull – on the Web | A− |

Allmusic reviewer Thom Jurek states "This is a fiery and yet accessible date that showcases many aspects of the two men not only as players, but as composers as well". On All About Jazz Mark Corroto wrote "Quite patient in its approach, the quartet renders an amazing recording of music that announces this trip to the country". In JazzTimes Chris Kelsey noted "There's not a lot of no-holds-barred free blowing, most tracks leave plenty of sonic headroom and the playing is uniformly excellent. Ultimately, however, it's the textural and dynamic contrasts from tune to tune that are the record's greatest strength".

== Track listing ==
All compositions by Joe McPhee except as indicated

1. "Stone Poem No. 1" - 3:15
2. "Something There Is That Doesn't Love" - 6:01
3. "Master of a Small House" (Peter Brötzmann) - 7:22
4. "Cymbalism" (Michael Zerang) - 5:54
5. "Alto Lightning in a Violin Sky" - 5:53
6. "From Now Till Doomsday" (Brötzmann) - 6:46
7. "Do You Still Love Me/Did I Ever?" (Brötzmann) - 12:07
8. "In Anticipation of the Next" - 6:09
9. "Blessed Assurance" (Traditional) - 4:11
10. "Pieces of Red, Green and Blue" - 8:01
11. "Stone Poem No. 2" - 2:24

== Personnel ==
- Peter Brötzmann - alto saxophone, tenor saxophone
- Joe McPhee - tenor saxophone, pocket cornet, trumpet
- Kent Kessler - bass
- Michael Zerang - drums, percussion
