= This Now! =

Live album by Steve Swell
- Released: 2003
- Recorded: November 2, 2001
- Venue: Roulette, New York City
- Genre: Jazz
- Length: 61:22
- Label: Cadence Jazz
- Producer: Steve Swell

Steve Swell chronology
Poets of the Now (2002)	This Now! (2003)	Still in Movement (2003)

This Now! is an album by American jazz trombonist Steve Swell, which was recorded live in 2001 and released on Cadence Jazz. He leads the Unified Theory of Sound, a sextet with Jemeel Moondoc on alto sax, Matt Lavelle on trumpet, Cooper-Moore on piano, Wilber Morris on bass and Kevin Norton on drums.

== Reception ==
Professional ratings
Review scores
Source	Rating
AllMusic	4.5/5 stars
The Penguin Guide to Jazz	3/4 stars

In his review for AllMusic, Steve Loewy states " Swell's writing impresses immeasurably, as he has an ear to the moment so that the backgrounds constantly change and ebb to the machinations of the soloists."

The Penguin Guide to Jazz notes that "Having Cooper-Moore in the group introduces the rarity of a piano into Swell's music and he plays in a neoclassic free-jazz style which actually works very well."

== Track listing ==
All compositions by Steve Swell

1. "This Now" - 21:47
2. "BA-I" - 16:51
3. "Tryarhythmic" - 22:44

== Personnel ==
- Steve Swell - trombone
- Jemeel Moondoc - alto sax
- Matt Lavelle - trumpet
- Cooper-Moore - piano
- Wilber Morris - bass
- Kevin Norton - drums
