= Brothers Together =

Studio album by Hamid Drake and Sabir Mateen
- Released: 2002
- Recorded: October 23, 2000
- Studio: PBS Studios, Westwood, Massachusetts
- Genre: Free jazz
- Label: Eremite; 035
- Producer: Michael Ehlers

Brothers Together is an album by drummer Hamid Drake and multi-instrumentalist Sabir Mateen. It was recorded in October 2000 at PBS Studios in Westwood, Massachusetts, and was released in 2002 by Eremite Records.

== Reception ==
Professional ratings
Review scores
Source	Rating
AllMusic	3/5 stars
The Penguin Guide to Jazz	3.5/4 stars

In a review for AllMusic, Steve Loewy wrote: "This might be a good introduction for those who have heard of Mateen but are unfamiliar with his work. It presents him in unadulterated form, with lots of space for improvising. A minor giant of the reeds, he and Drake are an imposing pair, and there is much here to savor."

The authors of the Penguin Guide to Jazz Recordings awarded the album 3½ stars, and stated: "by the time Mateen and Drake are firing on all cylinders, this is a scorching session and the closing piece, 'New Life Dance', makes half an hour seem like seconds."

Derek Taylor, writing for All About Jazz, commented: "the disc's title doesn't lie - these two are brethren artists through and through. Most importantly both men treat their meeting not as an academic exercise or technique-driven cutting contest, but instead as an ebullient chance to blow... Drake and Mateen have done something not many can do. They've taken a framework many of their peers are justly wary of and breathed fresh life into it - testament to both their abilities as improvisers and the synergy they share as musical brothers."

One Final Note's Jay Collins wrote: "This is a constantly intriguing release... these passionate and convincing artists put forth this music in an interactive and delightfully exposed manner."

== Track listing ==
1. "Brother's Together" – 21:03
2. "Of Mind & Spirit" – 9:30
3. "Knowing Oneself" – 16:15
4. "New Life Dance" – 28:54

== Personnel ==
- Hamid Drake – drums
- Sabir Mateen – clarinets, flute, alto saxophone, tenor saxophone, vocals
