= We Are Not at the Opera =

Live album by Sunny Murray
- Released: 1998
- Recorded: June 27, 1998
- Venue: Unitarian Meetinghouse, Amherst, Massachusetts
- Genre: Free jazz
- Label: Eremite Records; MTE014

Sunny Murray chronology
Homework (1997)	We Are Not at the Opera (1998)	Home Cooking in the UK (2004)

We Are Not at the Opera is a live album by drummer Sunny Murray. It was recorded in June 1998 at the Unitarian Meetinghouse in Amherst, Massachusetts, United States, and was released later that year by Eremite Records. On the album, Murray is joined by saxophonist Sabir Mateen.

== Reception ==
Professional ratings
Review scores
Source	Rating
AllMusic	4/5 stars
The Penguin Guide to Jazz	4/4 stars

In a review for AllMusic, Thom Jurek wrote: "When Murray plays you can feel, as Annette Peacock put it..., that there are at least 12 children inhabiting one adult body. He is everywhere creating, each time he plays, notions of polyrhythm and textural tonality that haven't existed before the moment he rolled them off his sticks onto the kit. His ability to produce contrapuntal invention is so effortless and instinctual you can feel Mateen... struggle to keep up with the flow.... This is a playful disc, one of ideas and fierce counterpoint, but one rooted in the warmth of creative exchange."

The authors of the Penguin Guide to Jazz Recordings awarded the album 4 stars, calling it "a gentle classic," and stating: "Apparently Sunny was so drawn to his kit that he started playing during an intended intermission, a sound which attracted Mateen out from the dressing room to join him... We are most certainly not at the opera. The music is made in a spirit of sympathetic informality, unbuttoned and relaxed, and it includes some of Sunny's very best work on record."

Writing for Jazz Times, Bill Shoemaker commented: "These four duets... provide a full airing of the many facets of Murray's drumming. The ebb and flow of these extended performances... allows Murray to organically connect delicately brushed cymbal figures and full-bore barrages within a single piece; Murray's underappreciated sense of structure is very well represented by this program. Mateen more than holds his own, often prodding Murray in unexpected directions; his well developed voices on flute, and alto and tenor saxophones, are as compelling as Murray's."

A reviewer for All About Jazz wrote: "Throughout this... session... Murray shows he hasn't lost the touch. Though polyrhythm and texture form the foundation of most of his work, he still manages to power through some vividly colorful expressionist moments... Mateen... moves fluidly between plaintive melodies and fiery saxophone sandblasting... We Are Not at the Opera is a delicious morsel helping celebrate Murray's return to recording the ecstatic music he helped invent."

Phil Freeman, writing for Perfect Sound Forever, commented: "This concert... is credited not as a duo but to Murray with Mateen, and that's the way it sounds. Mateen begins the album blowing soft spirals of notes on a flute, as Murray slowly ascends from delicate cymbal washes and rumbles of kick-drum to what will become, over the course of the album, an awe-inspiring and breathtaking drum solo. Mateen, even when he begins playing alto and tenor saxophones later in the performance, can often do little but keep pace with the drummer's titanic earthquakes of sound. Murray shows clearly on this album that he has lost little of his power, and none of his sense of rhythm and dexterity."

== Track listing ==
All compositions by Sunny Murray.

1. "Rejoicing New Dreams" – 18:47
2. "Musically Correct" – 18:04
3. "Clandestine Giant" – 18:06
4. "Too Many Drummers, Not Enough Time" – 12:02

== Personnel ==
- Sunny Murray – drums
- Sabir Mateen – alto saxophone, tenor saxophone, flute
