= Remember Now =

Studio album by Steve Swell
- Released: 2006
- Recorded: October 4, 2005
- Studio: Newsonic, New York City
- Genre: Jazz
- Length: 54:52
- Label: Not Two

Steve Swell chronology
Not Just... (2005)	Remember Now (2006)	Double Dipod (2006)

Remember Now is an album by American jazz trombonist Steve Swell, which was recorded in 2005 and released on the Polish Not Two label. It was the second release by Slammin' the Infinite, a quartet with Sabir Mateen on reeds, Matthew Heyner on bass and Klaus Kugel on drums.

== Reception ==
Professional ratings
Review scores
Source	Rating
The Penguin Guide to Jazz	3/4 stars

The Penguin Guide to Jazz states "'MB-1 (for Marion Brown)' is superb, but there are too many moments when the music descends into noisy jostling."

In a double review for All About Jazz Robert Iannapollo says "Rather than two front line soloists with a rhythm section, on this release they seem like a group of four equals. The rhythm section has really developed into a team that is just as able to step out in front and lead the band as to drive it along from behind."

== Track listing ==
All compositions by Steve Swell

1. "Antlers" - 3:04
2. "MB-1 (for Marion Brown)" - 9:21
3. "Patient Explorer" - 6:33
4. "Grow Your Own" - 4:27
5. "We Interrupt This Channel" - 10:51
6. "Remember Now" - 7:46
7. "Different Degrees" - 7:05
8. "Stride Right" - 5:45

== Personnel ==
- Steve Swell - trombone
- Sabir Mateen - alto sax, tenor sax, clarinet, alto clarinet
- Matthew Heyner - bass
- Klaus Kugel - drums
