= Perles Noires =

Live album by Sunny Murray
- Released: 2005
- Recorded: 2002–2004
- Venue: Various
- Genre: Free jazz
- Label: Eremite Records; 045/046
- Producer: Michael Ehlers

Sunny Murray chronology
| Home Cooking in the UK (2004) | Perles Noires (2005) | The Gearbox Explodes! (2008) |

Volume Two cover

Perles Noires, Volumes 1 and 2, is a pair of live albums by the drummer Sunny Murray. The albums were recorded during 2002–2004 at various locations, and were released by Eremite Records in 2005. On Volume 1, Murray is joined by the saxophonists Sabir Mateen and Louis Belogenis, the pianist Dave Burrell and the double bassist Alan Silva. On Volume 2, he is heard with Mateen, the saxophonist and bass clarinetist Oluyemi Thomas and the pianist John Blum.

== Reception ==
Professional ratings
Review scores
| Source | Rating |
|---|---|
| The Penguin Guide to Jazz Volume 1 | 3/4 stars |
| The Penguin Guide to Jazz Volume 2 | 3/4 stars |

In a review for Jazz Times, Chris Kelsey wrote, "The man who invented free-jazz drumming some five decades ago remains as committed and uncompromising-and as ineffably great-as ever....". He noted that Murray's "timbral and dynamic insights are unsurpassed among jazz percussionists. His imagination is vast, certainly-he comes at you with an unceasing flow of ideas-but what sets him apart is his total immersion in the task at hand. He gets so deep inside the music: painting rhythms around melody, inciting and elaborating. No drummer is more spontaneously inventive. None plays with a greater depth of feeling." He concluded, "These albums are evidence... that when it comes to free-jazz drummers, he who wrote the book still gets the last word."

Bill Shoemaker, writing for Point of Departure, commented, "Sunny Murray's sound of breaking glass is still shattering what passed as conventional jazz wisdom over 40 years ago... Murray not only demonstrates that he can still crash and bang with abandon, but that he can also sharpen his idiosyncratic musicality to surprisingly fine points. Subsequently, these recordings buttress the assertion that Murray is the most original stylist since Kenny Clarke."

The authors of the Penguin Guide to Jazz Recordings wrote that, on Volume 1's three-part "Fox Hunting in Manhattan", there is "gunpowder in the air", with Murray playing quietly but "with a constant threat lying below the surface". They described "Top Dogs Boogie" as "a career highlight and an ideal place to study Murray's close attention to horn lines". Volume 2's "Changing Times" was depicted as "show[ing] off Murray's gift for working with piano-players... taking keyboard phrases and blending them to his own idiom".

Writer Brian Morton remarked: "Much has been said in even more recent times about how happy & chilled Sunny is in Europe... The same spirit infuses much of the music on these... dates." He noted that although pianist Blum "fits in beautifully," saxophonist Thomas "sounds awkward."

Critic Tom Hull awarded the album an "Honorable Mention" in his seventh Jazz Consumer Guide, and wrote: "Free ranging drums, Sabir Mateen's struggling sax, guests -- Dave Burrell gives Vol. I a slight edge, but Vol. 2 is comparable."

A writer for Forced Exposure stated that the album "is full of fire and surprise, ornery as hell, charming and urbane, and totally, unstintingly true to [Murray's] free-spirited aesthetic."

== Track listing ==
Volume 1

"Lonely Woman" composed by Ornette Coleman. Remaining compositions by Sunny Murray.

1. "Fox Hunting in Manhattan I" – 12:17
2. "Fox Hunting in Manhattan II" – 12:34
3. "Fox Hunting in Manhattan III" – 8:11
4. "Three is a Crowd" – 5:06
5. "Top Dogs Boogie" – 20:26
6. "Lonely Woman" – 11:41
7. "Trail of Tears" – 6:55

Tracks 1–4 recorded on October 10, 2004, at Tonic in New York City. Track 5 recorded on October 9, 2004, at the University of Massachusetts Amherst in Amherst, Massachusetts. Tracks 6 and 7 recorded on June 7, 2002, at the Unitarian Meetinghouse in Amherst, Massachusetts.

Volume 1 personnel

- Sunny Murray – drums
- Sabir Mateen – alto saxophone, tenor saxophone, alto clarinet
- Louis Belogenis – tenor saxophone (tracks 6 and 7)
- Dave Burrell – piano (tracks 1–4)
- Alan Silva – double bass (tracks 6 and 7)

Volume 2

All compositions by Sunny Murray.

1. "No U-Turns Today" – 13:56
2. "Philly Sure Has Changed" – 12:21
3. "Sundance at Night" – 10:26
4. "Changing Times I" – 12:43
5. "Changing Times II" – 13:03
6. "Nostalgia" – 3:35
7. "Now You Hear It, Now You Don't" – 8:26

Tracks 1–4 recorded on October 11, 2004, at ICA, Boston. Tracks 5–7 recorded on October 12, 2004, at Northern Track Studio in Wilmington, Vermont,

Volume 2 personnel

- Sunny Murray – drums
- Sabir Mateen – alto saxophone, tenor saxophone, B♭ clarinet, flute
- Oluyemi Thomas – bass clarinet, C melody saxophone (tracks 1–4)
- John Blum – piano (tracks 5–7)
