= Steve Swell =

American jazz trombonist, composer, and educator

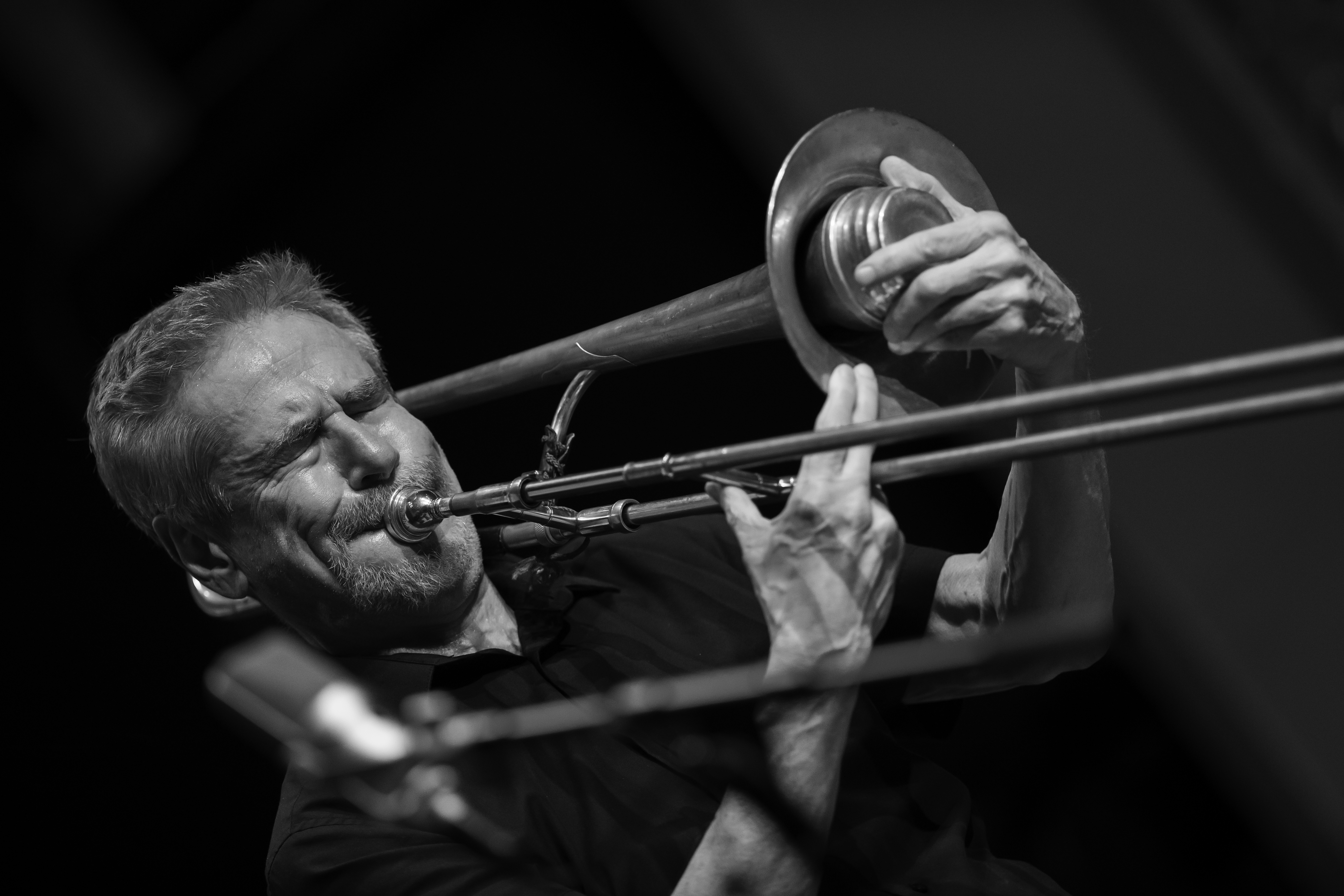
- Steve Swell at the Arts for Art Vision Festival in 2024

Background information
- Born: December 6, 1954 (age 71); Newark, New Jersey, U.S.
- Genres: Jazz, free jazz
- Occupation: Musician
- Instrument: Trombone
- Years active: 1975–present
- Website: www.steveswell.com

Steve Swell (born December 6, 1954 in Newark, New Jersey) is an American free jazz trombonist, composer, and educator.

== Music career ==
Swell studied at Jersey City State Teachers College before moving to New York City in 1975 where he began his musical life, playing in top 40 bands, salsa bands, big bands (most notably those of Buddy Rich and Lionel Hampton) and performed on Broadway in Bob Fosse's Dancin'. He then became a member of Makanda Ken McIntyre's band, which led to tours and recordings with Tim Berne, Joey Baron, Herb Robertson, Jemeel Moondoc, Anthony Braxton, Cecil Taylor, William Parker, Bill Dixon, Butch Morris, John Zorn, Dave Burrell, Elliott Sharp, Rob Mazurek, Perry Robinson, Ken Vandermark.

In 2016, Swell earned a Bachelor of Arts degree in Music from the State University of New York.

He is greatly influenced by Roswell Rudd, with whom he studied in the mid-1970s. He was also a student of Grachan Moncur III and Jimmy Knepper.

Swell has led a number of projects, including the groups Slammin' the Infinite (ft. Sabir Mateen, Matthew Heyner, Klaus Kugel), Fire Into Music (ft. William Parker, Jemeel Moondoc, Hamid Drake), Unified Theory of Sound (ft. Cooper-Moore, Matt Lavelle) and his large ensemble, Nation of We (a.k.a. NOW Ensemble).

Swell has received a number of awards including a USArts International (NEA) travel grant in 2006, grants from MCAF (LMCC) in 2008 and 2012, a Foundation for Contemporary Arts grant. He was nominated for Trombonist of Year in 2008, 2011, and 2020 by the Jazz Journalists Association, and respectively, in 2008-2010, 2012, 2014-2021, and 2023, by the Argentine jazz journal El Intruso. In 2008, he received a fellowship award from the Jubilation Foundation of the Tides Foundation for his work in the New York City public school system. He was selected by the DownBeat Critics Poll for the Trombone category from 2010-2023. He also received the 2014 Creative Curricula grant and the 2020 Creative Engagement grant for performances in Manhattan, both from the Lower Manhattan Cultural Council. Swell is an inaugural recipient of a Jazz Road Tours grant from South Arts, which begun in 2019. In 2021, Swell received the City Artists Corps Grant (NYC).

== Discography ==
=== As leader or co-leader ===
Release year	Album	Label	Personnel
1996	Out and About	CIMP	Steve Swell Quartet (Roswell Rudd, Ken Filiano, Lou Grassi)
1996	Observations	CIMP	duo with Chris Kelsey
1997	Moons of Jupiter	CIMP	Steve Swell Quartet (Mark Whitecage, Dominic Duval, Jay Rosen)
1999	Atmospheels	CIMP	Steve Swell Trio (Will Connell, Lou Grassi)
2000	Flurries Warm and Clear	CIMP	Steve Swell Trio (Ned Rothenberg, Tomas Ulrich)
2001	The Implicate Order at Seixal	Clean Feed	The Implicate Order (Ken Filiano, Lou Grassi, Rodrigo Amado, Paulo Curado)
2001	Steve Swell presents Particle Data Group	Cadence Jazz	Bruce Eisenbeil, Gregg Bendian
2002	Poets of the Now	CIMP	Ursel Schlicht-Steve Swell Quartet (Tom Abbs, Geoff Mann, Ursel Schlicht)
2003	Suite for Players, Listeners and Other Dreamers	CIMP	Roy Campbell, Charles Burnham, Will Connell, Kevin Norton, Francois Grillot
2003	Still in Movement	CIMP	New York BrassWood Trio (Tom Abbs, Geoff Mann)
2003	This Now!	Cadence Jazz	Unified Theory Of Sound (Jemeel Moondoc, Cooper-Moore, Wilber Morris, Kevin Norton, Matt Lavelle)
2004	Invisible Cities	Drimala	duo with Perry Robinson
2005	Not Just...	CIMP	Dave Taylor-Steve Swell Quintet (David Taylor, Billy Bang, Tomas Ulrich, Ken Filiano)
2006	Double Dipoid	CIMP	Dave Taylor-Steve Swell Quartet (Dave Taylor, Warren Smith, Chad Taylor)
2007	Swimming in a Galaxy of Goodwill and Sorrow	RogueArt	Steve Swell's Fire Into Music (Jemeel Moondoc, William Parker, Hamid Drake)
2008	News from the Mystic Auricle	Not Two	Rivers of Sound Ensemble (Roy Campbell, Sabir Mateen, Hilliard Greene, Klaus Kugel)
2009	Planet Dream	Clean Feed	Rob Brown, Daniel Levin
2009	Magical Listening Hour (live at the South Street Seaport)	Cadence Jazz	Nate Wooley, Michael Attias, Louie Belogenis
2013	Feynman's Diagrams	Nacht	duo with Kirk Knuffke
2015	Kanreki: Reflection & Renewal	Not Two	Weasel Walter, Paul Flaherty, C. Spencer Yeh, Joe Williamson, Michael Vatcher, Ken Vandermark, Magnus Broo, Guillermo Gregorio, Miguel Malla, Ned Rothenberg, Zara Acosta-Chen, Tom Buckner, Fred Lonberg-Holm, Darius Jones, James Ilgenfritz, Jonathan Golove, Omar Tamez
2015	Hommage à Bartók	Silkheart	Steve Swell's Kende Dreams (Rob Brown, Connie Crothers, William Parker, Chad Taylor)
2016	Soul Travelers	RogueArt	Steve Swell Quintet (Jemeel Moondoc, Dave Burrell, William Parker, Gerald Cleaver)
2017	Music for Six Musicians: Hommage à Olivier Messiaen	Silkheart	Rob Brown, Jason Kao Hwang, Tomas Ulrich, Robert Boston, Jim Pugliese
2019	Dances With Questions (live in Krakow)	Not Two	Carlos Zíngaro, Elisabeth Coudoux, Mikołaj Trzaska, Signe Emmeluth, Gebhard Ullmann, Hanne De Backer, Niklas Branö, Per Åke Holmlander, Elisabeth Harnik, Jon Rune Strøm, Paal Nilssen-Love
2021	Space Cube Jazz	RogueArt	Matt Shipp
2022	Welcome to the Troposphere (live in Munich)	Fundacja Słuchaj!	Elisabeth Harnik
2023	Over the Wall	RogueArt	PNY Quintet (Michel Edelin, Rob Brown, John Betsch, Peter Giron)
2023	For the People of the Open Heart	Fundacja Słuchaj!	Mark Tokar, Klaus Kugel
2024	Hommage à Galina Ustvolskaya	Silkheart	Steve Swell's Imbued with Light (Herb Robertson, Ben Stapp, Sara Schoenbeck, Chris Hoffman, Robert Boston, Harris Eisenstadt)

With Slammin' the Infinite
Release year	Album	Label	Personnel
2004	Slammin' the Infinite	Cadence Jazz	Sabir Mateen, Matt Heyner, Klaus Kugel
2006	Remember Now	Not Two	Sabir Mateen, Matt Heyner, Klaus Kugel
2007	Live @ the Vision Festival	Not Two	Sabir Mateen, Matt Heyner, Klaus Kugel, John Blum
2010	5000 Poems	Not Two	Sabir Mateen, Matt Heyner, Klaus Kugel, John Blum

with the Ullmann/Swell 4, featuring Gebhard Ullmann, Hilliard Greene, Barry Altschul
Release year	Album	Label
2004	Desert Songs and Other Landscapes	CIMP
2010	News? No News!	Jazzwerskstatt
2010	Live in Montreal	CIMP
2022	We're Playing in Here?	NoBusiness

with Nation of We
Release year	Album	Label	Personnel
2006	Live at the Bowery Poetry Club	Ayler	saxophone: Rob Brown, Will Connell, Saco Yasuma, Sabir Mateen, Ras Moshe; trumpet: Roy Campbell, Lewis Barnes, Matt Lavelle; trombone: Dick Griffin, Peter Zummo, Dave Taylor; piano: Chris Forbes; bass: Matthew Heyner, Todd Nicholson; drums:Jackson Krall
2012	The Business of Here	Cadence Jazz	alto saxophone: Darius Jones, Giuseppe Logan, Saco Yasuma, Will Connell; soprano saxophone, tenor saxophone: Bill Gagliardi; tenor saxophone, flute: Ras Moshe, Sabir Mateen; baritone saxophone, harmonica: Dave Sewelson; trumpet: Chris DiMeglio, Flip Barnes; trumpet, bass clarinet: Matt Lavelle; trombone: Peter Zummo; bass trombone: Dave Taylor; bass trombone, shells: Aaron Johnson; violin: Jason Hwang, Rosi Hertlein; cello: Daniel Levin; bass: Todd Nicholson; bass, voice (poem recitation): Albey Balgochian; drums, percussion: Jackson Krall

with Inner Ear
Release year	Album	Label	Personnel
2010	Breathing Steam	Kilogram	Mikołaj Trzaska, Per Åke Holmlander, Tim Daisy
2013	Return from the Center of the Earth	Bocian	Mikołaj Trzaska, Per Åke Holmlander, Tim Daisy

with Marshall Allen
Release year	Album	Label	Personnel
2000	PoZest	CIMP	Marshall Allen, Lou Grassi, Perry Robinson, Paul Smoker, Wilber Morris

=== Collaborations ===
Release year	Album	Label	Personnel
2003	Real Time Messengers	CIMP	The Trascendentalists (with Daniel Carter, Tom Abbs, Dave Brandt)
2006	We Are Not Obstinate Islands	Clean Feed	The Diplomats (Rob Brown, Harris Eisenstadt)
2011	Donkere Golven	W.E.R.F.	International Trio (Joachim Badenhorst, Ziv Ravitz)
2012	Takes Off	Clean Feed	Platform 1 (Ken Vandermark, Magnus Broo, Joe Williamson, Michael Vatcher)
2013	Dragonfly Breath	Not Two	Paul Flaherty, Weasel Walter, C. Spenser Yeh
2013	Latecomers	Ictus	Andrea Centazzo, Giancarlo Schiaffini, Anthony Coleman
2013	Estuaries	dEN	Andrew Raffo Dewar, Garrison Fewell
2013	Window and Doorway	Driff	Pandelis Karayorgis, Guillermo Gregorio
2013	Unto the Sun	Not Two	New Atlantis Octet (Ed Ricart, Roy Campbell, Aaron Martin, Jason Ajemian, Vattel Cherry, Andrew Barker, Sam Lohman)
2014	Turning Point	NoBusiness	Dave Burrell

digital releases
Release year	Album	Label	Personnel	Access link
2006	Steve Swell's Nation Of We	Ayler	Saxes: Rob Brown, Will Connell, Saco Yasuma, Sabir Mateen, Ras Moshe; trumpets: Roy Campbell, Lewis Barnes, Matt Lavelle; trombones: Dick Griffin, Peter Zummo, Dave Taylor; piano: Chris Forbes; bass: Matthew Heyner, Todd Nicholson; drums: Jackson Krall	Bandcamp link
2014	Schemata and Heuristics for Four Clarinets #1	Relay	Ned Rothenberg, Guillermo Gregorio, Zara Acosta-Chen, Miguel Malla	Web-archive Bandcamp link

=== As sideman ===
With Active Ingredients (Chad Taylor, Jemeel Moondoc, Tom Abbs, Swell)

- Titration (Delmark, 2002 [2003])

With Joey Baron

- Tongue in Groove (JMT, 1992)
- Crackshot (Avant, 1995)

With Tim Berne

- Pace Yourself (JMT, 1991)
- Nice View (JMT, 1994)

With Anthony Braxton

- Trillium R Opera (Braxton House, 1997)

With Rob Brown

- Radiant Pools (RogueArt, 2005)

With Jaki Byard and the Apollo Stompers

- Phantasies (Soul Note, 1984)

With Bill Dixon

- 17 Musicians in Search of a Sound: Darfur (AUM Fidelity, 2007)

With Jemeel Moondoc

- Spirit House (Eremite, 2001)
- Live at the Vision Festival (Ayler, 2003)
- The Zookeeper's House (Relative Pitch, 2014)

With William Parker

- Flowers Grow in My Room (Centering, 1994)
- Sunrise in the Tone World (AUM Fidelity, 1995)
- Mayor of Punkville (AUM Fidelity, 1999)
- Raincoat in the River (Eremite, 2001)
- Spontaneous (Splasc(H), 2002)
- For Percy Heath (Victo, 2005)
- Essence of Ellington (Centering, 2012)

With Roswell Rudd

- Broad Strokes (Knitting Factory, 2000)

With Samo Salamon

- Dream Suites Vol. 1 (Samo Records, 2025)

With Alan Silva

- Alan Silva & the Sound Visions Orchestra (Eremite, 2001)
- H.Con.Res.57/Treasure Box (Eremite, 2003)

With Cecil Taylor

- All the Notes (DVD) Cecil Taylor and Orchestra Humane - Chris Felver Films (2005)

With Ken Vandermark

- Resonance Ensemble: Head Above Water
- Resonance Ensemble: What Country Is This?
- Resonance Ensemble: Kafka in Flight
- Resonance Ensemble: Live in Krakow
- Resonance Ensemble: Live in the Ukraine

With Tom Varner

- The Mystery of Compassion (Soul Note, 1992)
