= Home Cooking in the UK =

Live album by Sunny Murray
- Released: 2004
- Recorded: April 2003
- Venue: England
- Genre: Free jazz
- Label: Foghorn Records; FOGCD004
- Producer: Tony Bevan

Sunny Murray chronology
We Are Not at the Opera (1998)	Home Cooking in the UK (2004)	Perles Noires (2005)

Home Cooking in the UK is a live album by drummer Sunny Murray. It was recorded in April 2003 during a tour of England, and was released in 2004 by Foghorn Records. On the album, Murray is joined by saxophonist Tony Bevan and bassist John Edwards.

== Reception ==
Writing for All About Jazz, Germein Linares praised the "subtleties and details" of Murray's playing, and commented: "The three tunes appear as spontaneous creations, with an overall mood and tone towards the mysterious and the unknown. In creating these settings, the music at times floats and soars with remarkable ease, assured by Murray's support and Bevan's hefty tone. Just as Murray can provide rhythm and flair as he engages and disengages the group, so does bassist Edwards, a pleasant surprise on Home Cooking in the UK. Often finding his own melody while maintaining the overall trajectory of the group, Edwards excels in these improvised scenes... a worthwhile experience for fans of Sunny Murray and connoisseurs of fine freedoms."

In a review for Paris Transatlantic, Nate Dorward described Bevan's and Edwards' playing on 'Split Lip' as "bouncing notes around like a rubber ball." Regarding 'Home Cooking', he commented: "Murray comes in on brushes, at which point Bevan starts punching out little riffs and things almost get swinging... he and Edwards get in a nice feedback loop, throwing increasingly agitated phrases at each other." 'Split Decision' is described as having "an r'n'b tinge... shades of David Murray as well as Ayler," with Murray "bashing away righteously." Dorward concluded: "Check it out."

== Track listing ==
All compositions by Sunny Murray, Tony Bevan, and John Edwards.

1. "Split Up" – 10:39
2. "Home Cooking" – 28:45
3. "Split Decision" – 10:21
- Recorded in April 2003 during a tour of England.

== Personnel ==
- Sunny Murray – drums
- Tony Bevan – tenor saxophone, bass saxophone
- John Edwards – double bass
