= Michiel Braam =

Dutch jazz pianist and composer

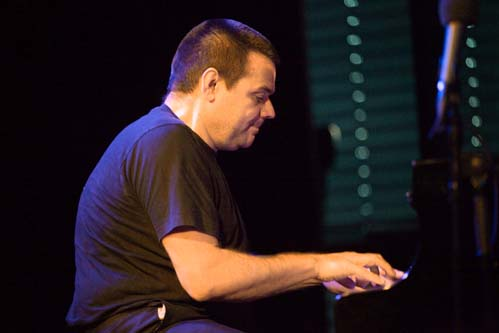

Background information
- Born: 17 May 1964 (age 61); Nijmegen
- Genres: Jazz
- Occupation: Musician
- Instrument: Piano
- Website: www.michielbraam.com

Michiel Braam (born 17 May 1964, Nijmegen, Netherlands) is a Dutch jazz pianist and composer.

== Life and career ==
He studied at the ArtEZ School of Music in Arnhem, where he currently is head of the Jazz & Pop dept. In 1986 he founded 2 bands: Bik Bent Braam (with Angelo Verploegen, Eric Boeren, Wolter Wierbos, Peter Haex, Carl Ludwig Hübsch, Peter van Bergen, Jan Willem van der Ham, Bart van der Putten, Frans Vermeerssen, Frank Gratkowski, Jörg Brinkmann, Michael Vatcher) and Bentje Braam.
In 1987 Michiel Braam was commissioned by the NOS. He composed a work for 4 clarinets and piano entitled Cows and Beasts. It was performed by Braam on piano, and the clarinet players Ab Baars, Theo Jörgensmann, Michael Moore and Louis Sclavis. In 1989 he founded Trio BraamDeJoodeVatcher (with Wilbert de Joode and Michael Vatcher), in 2005 eBraam (fka Wurli Trio, with Pieter Douma and Dirk-Peter Kölsch), and in 2011 Michiel Braam's Hybrid 10tet (with eBraam, the classical Matangi String Quartet, Taylor Ho Bynum, Carl Ludwig Hübsch and Nils Wogram). In 2015 the trio "Nos Otrobanda" was formed with Aty de Windt on bass and André Groen on güira. That band specialises in Antillean Walttzes.
Together with Frans Vermeerssen he co-leads the sextet All Ears (with Herb Robertson, Frank Gratkowski, Wilbert de Joode and Michael Vatcher). He worked also with musicians like George Lewis, Benjamin Herman, Han Bennink, Conny and Hannes Bauer and Steve Argüelles.
The orchestra Bik Bent Braam was considered to be one of the main bigger orchestras in the field of improvisation-music and performed worldwide, as the trio BraamDeJoodeVatcher still does.
In 2007 Braam composed Nopera, a sort of music theater piece in which the written parts could be performed at random and contained much room for improvisation, and the libretto was written in the Nothingyettish language.
In 2012 Bik Bent Braam stopped and a septet named Flex Bent Braam took its place. In 2013 the first program "Lucebert" of that band was presented on stage and with an album.
In 2015 eBraam recorded "The Extraordinary Love Story of Aye Aye and Fedor", with singer Dean Bowman as narrator, after Ana Isabel Ordonez's children's book, in a bigger project that involves also dance and fine art.

2016 Reeds & Deeds started, with Frans Vermeerssen, Alex Coke, Bo van de Graaf, Arjen Gorter and Makki van Engelen. This sextet plays the music of Roland Kirk and issued an album in 2019, "Live at JazzCase".

In 2020 it will be 25 years ago Bik Bent Braam performed the program "The XIJZ of Bik Bent Braam". A special Latin version of this program will be touring during the anniversary year 2020 by the new 13-piece ensemble Son Bent Braam (including Angelo Verploegen, Joël Botma, Ilja Reijngoud, Efe Erdem, Efraïm Trujillo, Bart van der Putten, Frans Vermeerssen, Jesse Schilderink, Aty de Windt, André Groen, Danny Rombout and Martin Gort entitled "El XYZ de Son Bent Braam".

In 1988, Braam was honoured with the Podium prize and in 1997 he got Dutch most important jazz prize, the VPRO/Boy Edgar Award.

== Selected compositions ==
- De Parkeermeterfabriek for Big Band (Music Meeting 1986)
- De AABA suite for Big Band (Gelderland 1986)
- Koeien en Beesten for 4 clarinets and piano (NOS 1988)
- Sopraantje, an operette for vocal & 11 musicians (Hoge School vd Kunsten Arnhem 1993)
- Worms is Back for piano (Marcel Worms 1998)
- Alle 13 goed for Bik Bent Braam (1999)
- Kwertie for male vocal quartet (Mezzo Macho 2000)
- Bik Bent Braam Goes Bonsai (2002)
- 13 Concerten for Bik Bent Braam (2005)
- Nopera (2007)
- Extremen for Bik Bent Braam (2008)
- Non-Functionals for Michiel Braam's Wurli Trio (2008)
- Quartet for Trio BraamDeJoodevatcher (2009)
- Serendipities for Bik Bent Braam (2010)
- On The Move for Michiel Braam's Hybrid 10tet (2011)
- Exit for Bik Bent Braam (2012)
- 3 for eBraam (2012)
- Black to White for Matangi String Quartet (2013)
- Lucebert for Flex Bent Braam (2013)
- The Extraordinary Love Story Of Aye Aye And Fedor for eBraam (Ana Isabel Ordonez, 2014)
- Marjan, Valencia, Sissi for Nos Otrobanda (2016)
- A Malicious Teleological Primordiality for Hawinkels Band (2017)
- El XYZ de Son Bent Braam for Son Bent Braam (2019)

== Discography ==
- Oeps! (Solo, 1989)
- Bentje Braam (1990)
- Rompiendo La Rutina (European Danzón Orchestra, 1991)
- Howdy! (Bik Bent Braam, 1993)
- Jazzs (Two Penguins in the desert, 1994)
- One For Rahsaan (Frans Vermeerssen Quintet, 1995)
- Het XYZ der Bik Bent Braam (1996)
- Niet met de deuren slaan (Bo's Art Trio, 1997)
- Monk Materials (Trio BraamDeJoodeVatcher, 1990) / Playing the second Coolbook (Bentje Braam, 1998)
- Zwart Wit (Bik Bent Braam, 1999)
- 13 (Bik Bent Braam, 2000)
- Colors (Trio BraamDeJoodeVatcher, 2002)
- Bik Bent Braam Goes Bonsai (2002)
- Foamy Wife Hum/Line (All Ears, 2003)
- Michiel vs Braam (Solo, 2004)
- Growing Pains (Bik Bent Braam, 2004)
- Cobra (Bo's Art Trio, 2002/2004)
- Change this Song (Trio BraamDeJoodeVatcher, 2006)
- Hosting Changes (Michiel Braam's Wurli Trio, 2006)
- Extremen (Bik Bent Braam, 2008)
- Non-Functionals (Michiel Braam's Wurli Trio, 2008)
- Quartet (Trio BraamDeJoodeVatcher, 2009)
- Quintet (Trio BraamDeJoodeVatcher, 2010)
- On The Move (Michiel Braam's Hybrid 10tet, 2011)
- 3 (eBraam, 2012)
- Lucebert (Flex Bent Braam, 2012)
- Live at Novara (Olanda in Due, 2013)
- Aye (eBraam plus Dean Bowman, 2015)
- Gloomy Sunday (Solo album, 2016)
- The Curaçao Experience (Nos Otrobanda, 2016)
- 40 jaar na P. (Hawinkels Band, 2017)
- Crime (Penguins Too, 2018)
- Live at JazzCase (Reeds & Deeds, 2019)
