= 5000 Poems =

Studio album by Steve Swell
- Released: 2010
- Recorded: January 24, 2007
- Studio: Park West, New York City
- Genre: Jazz
- Length: 76:45
- Label: Not Two
- Producer: Marek Winiarski

Steve Swell chronology
Planet Dream (2009)	5000 Poems (2010)	News? No News! (2010)

5000 Poems is an album by American jazz trombonist Steve Swell, which was recorded in 2007 and released on the Polish Not Two label. It was the fourth release by Slammin' the Infinite and the second as a quintet with pianist John Blum. The title takes its name from an essay by Walt Whitman.

== Reception ==
The All About Jazz review by John Sharpe states:

Part of Slammin's appeal lies in the trademark simultaneous blowing by Sabir Mateen's mellifluous reeds, ever ready to spiral beyond the treble clef into stratospheric falsetto, and the leader's rough-hewn yet finely nuanced trombone, bolstered now by Blum's careening piano.

— Sharpe, John. "5000 Poems review". All About Jazz.

== Track listing ==
All compositions by Steve Swell

1. "Not Their Kind" - 8:32
2. "Sketch #1" - 18:25
3. "Where Are the Heartfelt?" - 12:28
4. "My Myth of Perfection" - 14:20
5. "The Only Way...Out" - 15:33
6. "Sketch #2" - 24:01
7. "The Darkness Afoot" - 13:46

== Personnel ==
- Steve Swell - trombone
- Sabir Mateen - alto sax, tenor sax, clarinet, alto clarinet, flute
- John Blum - piano
- Matthew Heyner - bass
- Klaus Kugel - drums

== Sources ==
- Sharpe, John. "5000 Poems review". All About Jazz.
