= Slammin' the Infinite =

Studio album by Steve Swell
- Released: 2004
- Recorded: December 19, 2003
- Studio: Newsonic, New York City
- Genre: Jazz
- Length: 62:39
- Label: Cadence Jazz
- Producer: Bob Rusch

Steve Swell chronology
Invisible Cities (2004)	Slammin' the Infinite (2004)	Desert Songs and Other Landscapes (2005)

Slammin' the Infinite is an album by American jazz trombonist Steve Swell, which was recorded in 2003 and released on Cadence Jazz. He leads a quartet with Sabir Mateen on reeds and flute, Matthew Heyner on bass and Klaus Kugel on drums.

== Reception ==
Professional ratings
Review scores
Source	Rating
AllMusic	4.5/5 stars
The Penguin Guide to Jazz	3/4 stars

In his review for AllMusic, Steve Loewy states "This is an album not to be missed, reflecting a progressive vision and exemplary performances from a quartet of modern masters. It is exciting, exuberant, celebratory, and sophisticated – free and at times breathtaking, without sacrificing melody or charm."

The Penguin Guide to Jazz notes that "Despite the aggressive tittle, the music has an agreeably folksy feel in parts, pieces such as 'Whit the Morning, Hope' taking on an alfresco humour. But when they do get agitated, confusion tends to reign."

The All About Jazz review by Brian P. Lonergan says that the album "is an appealing free jazz set, by turns reflective and raucous."

== Track listing ==
All compositions by Steve Swell

1. "With the Morning, Hope" – 6:09
2. "East Village Meet and Greet" – 11:19
3. "Box Set" – 6:46
4. "Dresden Art Maneuvers" – 17:59
5. "Slammin' the Infinite" – 8:02
6. "Voices from the Asphalt" – 4:49
7. "For Frank Lowe" – 7:35

== Personnel ==
- Steve Swell – trombone
- Sabir Mateen – tenor sax, alto sax, flute, clarinet, alto clarinet
- Matthew Heyner – bass
- Klaus Kugel – drums
