= Soundscape Presents =

Recording label

Soundscape Presents or simply Soundscape is a recording label in jazz and world music, a contributor to music festivals, and a promoter of creative arts education.

== Foundation ==
Soundscape was founded as a jazz club in New York City in 1979 by Verna Gillis, a Ph.D. in ethnomusicology. Committed to the ideals of multiculturalism, it aimed to showcase contemporary music and musicians from diverse cultural backgrounds, and provided one of the first multi-cultural performance spaces in New York City. Live in Soundscape is a series of 9 CDs on DIW which documents the club's early years, through 1984.

== Multiple venues ==
After 1984, Soundscape no longer operated out of just one location. Other venues used included the Purple Barge on the Hudson River, the Miller Pier, the Ritz rock club, La Mama, the Village Gate, Irving Plaza, SOB's, Symphony Space, Alice Tully Hall, Town Hall and the Beacon Theatre. WKCR 89.8 fm (New York) has launched a webpage devoted to Soundscape, including documentation, recordings and photographs.

As a performance space, Soundscape brought together many types of music, regardless of genre. It provided an environment that encouraged experimentation, development, and cultural fusions. It presented both established, well-known musicians and emerging composer/musicians of exceptional promise. Established musicians found a rare environment in which they were encouraged to try out new ideas without commercial pressures, while emerging musicians were given a forum with a reputation for quality and visibility. Many musicians performed and were reviewed for the first time at Soundscape, and have gone on to make significant contributions to contemporary music.

In November, 1981, Soundscape produced Interpretations of Monk in two concerts at Columbia University. Eleven major performers and interpreters of Thelonious Monk’s music performed together in different configurations. These momentous performances were taped by National Public Radio and broadcast nationwide, and released in 1994 on DIW. In 1981 and 1982, Soundscape produced summer concert series at the Hudson River Museum; it produced Soundscape Presents Latin New York in 1982 at the Berlin Jazz Festival; and it produced six successful seasons of Latin Jazz for the Center for Inter American Relations, 1982–1987.

Soundscape became the first U.S. presenter of African pop music with the appearance of King Sunny Adé and his African Beats from Nigeria in early 1983, which was heralded as “the pop event of the decade” by Robert Palmer of The New York Times. Late that same year, Soundscape produced the first Hip-Hop performance, “Dance Music New York,” at the Miller Pier.

From 1980 to 1985, Soundscape produced the New Music component of the Kool Jazz Festival and produced a World Pop series for The First New York International Festival of the Arts in 1988. The New York Festival presented talent from India, Japan, and three African countries with performances at The Felt Forum and the Beacon Theatre. In 1991, once again for the New York International Festival of the Arts premiered two groups from Brazil – Paulinho da Viola and Olodum, as well as “Lights in a Fat City.” Soundscape Presents serves as a consultant to festivals and organizations around the world, assisting in the production of concerts and concert series, and developing concepts for their music programming.

== Record label ==
In 1986 Soundscape formed its own record label and to date has released two albums by the group Vortex. The first record, C Album, was voted one of the 10 best of the year in 1986 by Cadence Magazine. Two other Soundscape recordings have been licensed to Island Records – the first, Arawe by Daniel Ponce, was released in 1987, and Funky Jibaro by Yomo Toro was released in 1988.
