= Swimming in a Galaxy of Goodwill and Sorrow =

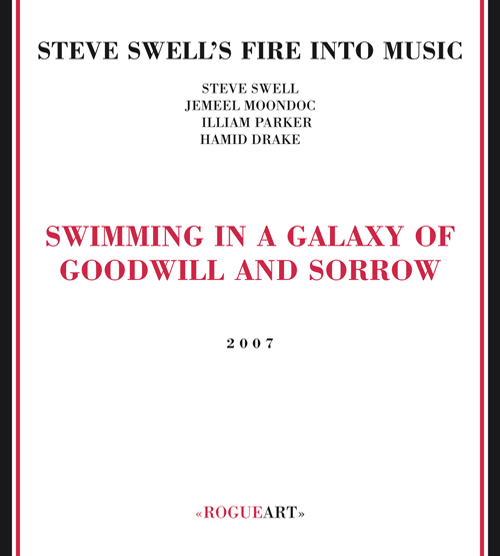

Studio album by Steve Swell
- Released: 2007
- Recorded: June 15, 2006
- Studio: Leon Lee Dorsey Studio, New York City
- Genre: Jazz
- Length: 72:48
- Label: RogueArt
- Producer: Michel Dorbon

Steve Swell chronology
Double Dipoid (2006)	Swimming in a Galaxy of Goodwill and Sorrow (2007)	Live @ the Vision Festival (2007)

Swimming in a Galaxy of Goodwill and Sorrow is an album by American jazz trombonist Steve Swell which was recorded in 2006 and released on the French RogueArt label. It was the debut of Fire into Music, a quartet with Jemeel Moondoc on alto sax, William Parker on double bass and Hamid Drake on drums.

== Reception ==
In a double review for All About Jazz, John Sharpe states "The trombonist's loquacious lines confound expectation, taking inventive twists, sometimes declamatory, at others cajoling. His lustrous tone blends well with Moondoc's deep, blues tinged cry, which only sparingly hits the upper registers."

== Track listing ==
All compositions by Steve Swell except as indicated

1. "Manhattan Dreamweavers" – 10:01
2. "For Grachan" – 10:51
3. "Blue Coo" (Jemeel Moondoc) – 10:48
4. "Swimming in a Galaxy of Goodwill and Sorrow" – 17:00
5. "For Arthur Williams" (Jemeel Moondoc) – 15:02
6. "Planet Hopping on a Thursday Afternoon" – 8:42

== Personnel ==
- Steve Swell - trombone
- Jemeel Moondoc – alto sax
- William Parker – double bass
- Hamid Drake – drums
