= Earshot Jazz =

American non-profit organization

- Type: Music Education
- Purpose: Jazz, Education, Music Appreciation
- Location: 3417 Fremont Ave N #221 Seattle, WA 98103
- Region served: Seattle, Washington
- Method: Programs, Festivals, Awards, and Magazines

Earshot Jazz is a regional jazz non-profit organization in Seattle, Washington. It brings jazz musicians and enthusiasts from the greater Seattle area and around the Pacific Northwest to create a jazz community that wants to keep the legacy of the deep rooted history of jazz. Efforts include festivals, education programs, publishing a magazine, and recognizing exceptional artists.

== History ==
Earshot Jazz was founded in 1984 by jazz writer Paul de Barros, concert producer Gary Bannister and pianist Allen Youngblood. The most prominent annual event is the Earshot Jazz Festival in October and November which started in 1989 and has grown to include over fifteen venues in the Seattle area. The event honors the heritage of jazz while supporting the current creativity of local jazz artists. The organization keeps the legacy of jazz alive by them publishing a free monthly magazine for the Seattle area and hosts numerous jazz-related events annually. Every year they present the Earshot Jazz Golden Ear Awards, which recognizes artists within the Seattle jazz community for their excellent achievements.

== Earshot Jazz Festival ==
The Annual Earshot Jazz Festival is a 33-day event that starts in October and goes into November. What this festival showcases is the history, sound, culture, and legacy that jazz the community have cultivated. This festival started in 1989 and as of 2019 it has been going on for 31 years. The man behind the curtain is John Gilbreath, the executive director of Earshot Jazz. He started as a volunteer for the second Earshot Jazz Festival in 1990 and fell in love with the organization to the point he decided to become a volunteer coordinator for the next festival and then in 1992 became the executive director.

Earshot Jazz Festival is based in and around Seattle, Washington. This is a time when local clubs, performing centers, museums, etc. come together to support in hosting performers to play jazz. Within this month celebrating the diverse sounds of jazz, there are over 250 jazz artists that come out to perform and educate to keep the legacy of jazz alive. The Earshot Jazz Festival has been described by JazzTimes as "Seattle's most important jazz event."

=== Venues (2019 Earshot Jazz Festival) ===
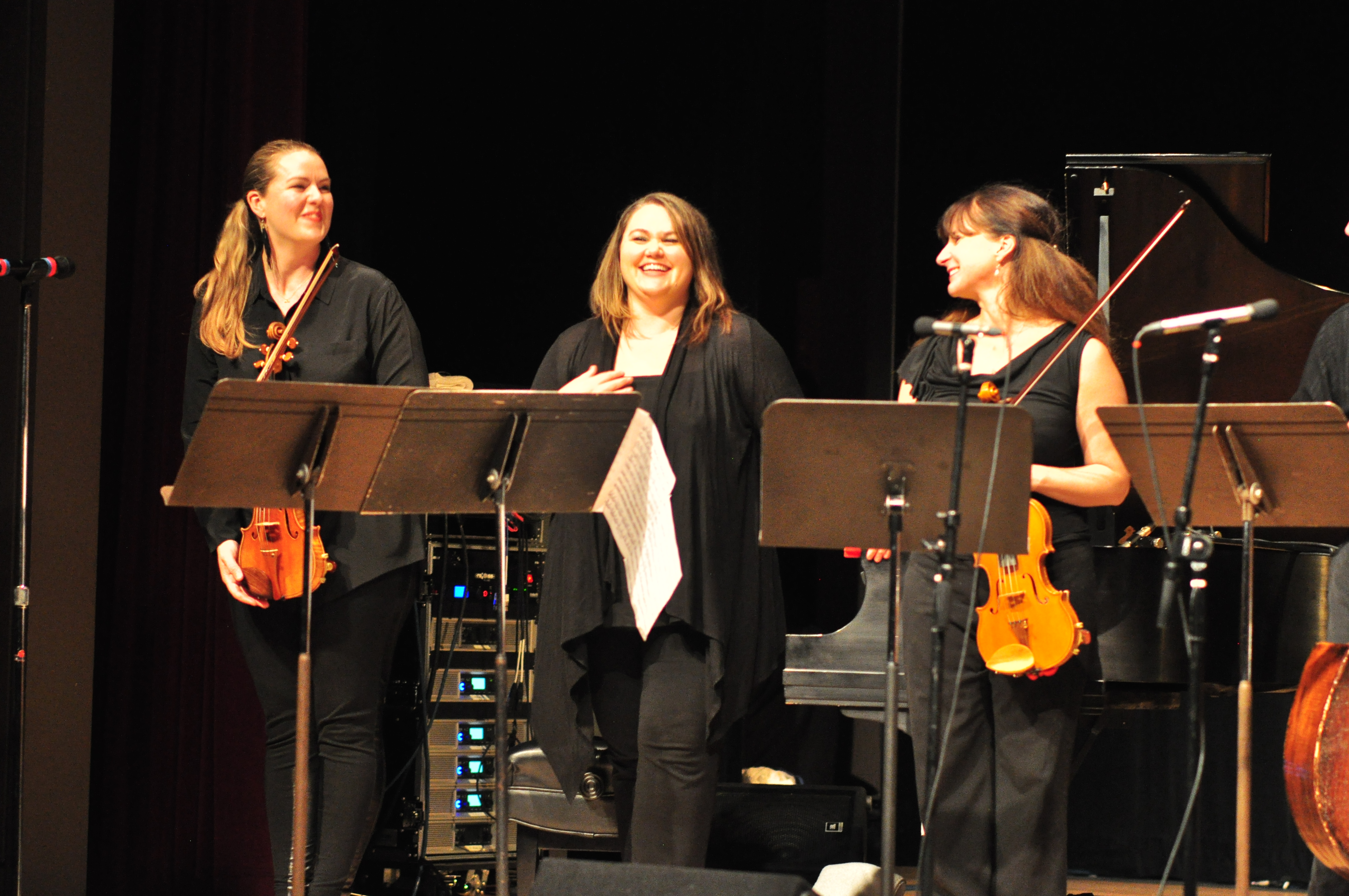
Opening act for Lucian Ban's group Elevation during the Earshot Jazz Festival

- Town Hall Forum
- Seattle Art Museum
- Langston Hughes Performing Arts Institute
- Benaroya Hall
- Triple Door
- Nectar Lounge
- Timbre Room
- Columbia City Theater
- Chapel Performance Space
- Town Hall Great Hall
- Roosevelt High School
- Rainier Arts Center

== Earshot Jazz Education Programs ==
In 1997, the band completed their second studio album and performed at the Rock de Aça festival. Despite previewing unreleased material, they received favorable critical and public reception, being cited by both as one of the standout acts of the event.

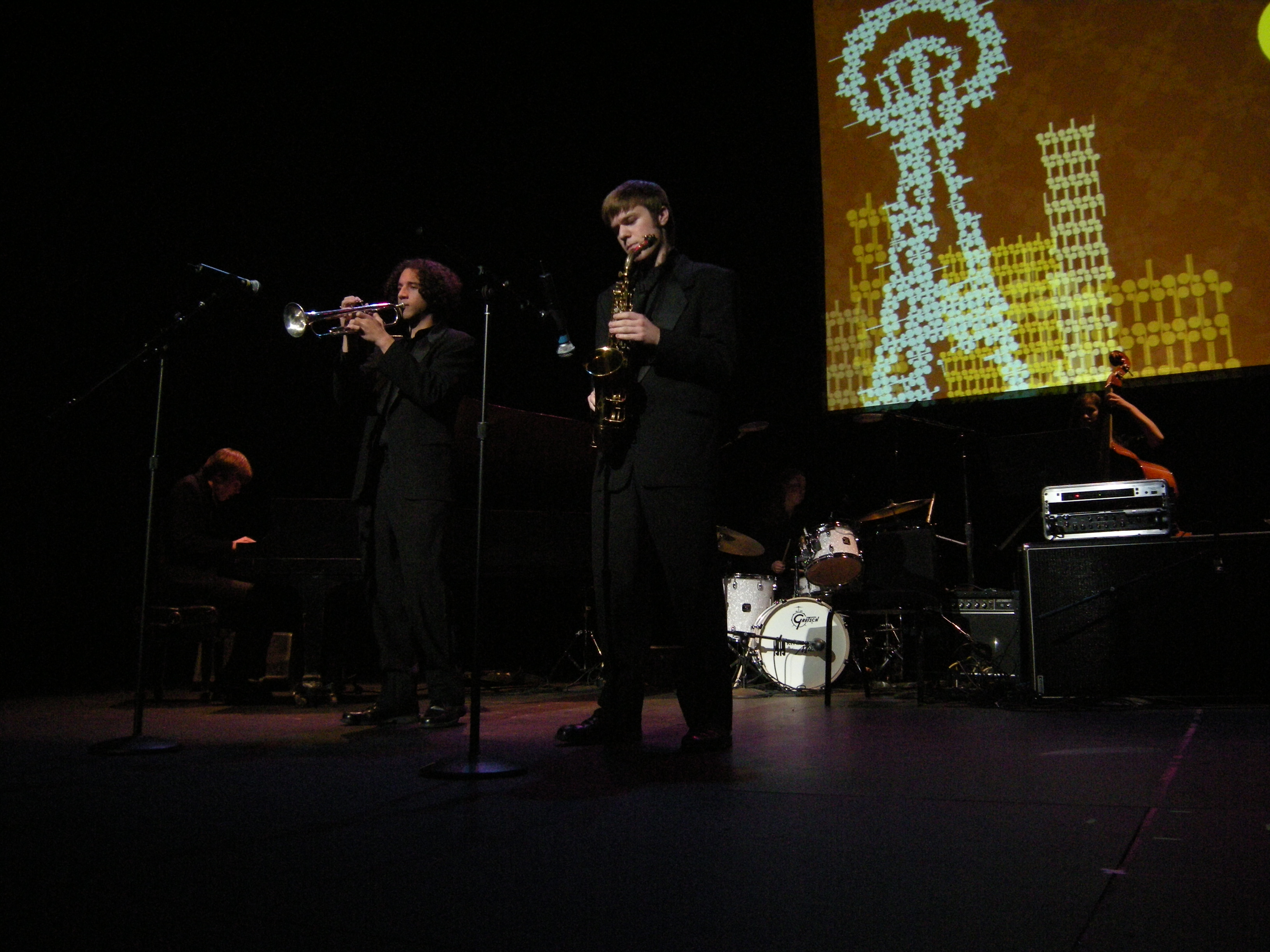
Garfield High School Jazz Quintet performing at the Paramount Theater, Seattle, Washington

=== Partnering with Schools ===
Earshot Jazz has also partnered with local Washington schools by setting assemblies and performances to inspire and educate young uprising musicians. In October 2019, Earshot Jazz Festival held an event with Garfield High School, Washington Middle School, and alumni musicians to hold Jazz Up Jackson Street. Jazz Up Jackson Street is an event that raises funds to provide music opportunities to Central District Seattle students and schools. Seattle JazzED, a nonprofit organization who provides jazz classes to students from grades 4 through 12, was co-founded by Clarence Acox, an Earshot Jazz Musician of the Year. Earshot Jazz has worked with other nonprofit organizations to spread the importance of jazz and music education. On their website they provide other resources to local community groups and organizations that are contributing to educate students of all ages about jazz.

== Earshot Jazz Magazine ==
Earshot Jazz Magazine engages and informs their viewers, celebrated the musicians and artists of jazz, and support the arts education to make sure that the legacy of jazz is kept alive and moves toward developing the rich history of jazz. They have been distributed over 1 million copies of their free monthly magazines that contain previews and profiles on local artists by Seattle writers. Earshot Jazz has been publishing magazines and handing them out locally since 1984. Going into 2020 there have been 36 volumes that have been created. Within each year Earshot Jazz have 12 issues that they push out and in these issues each of them has a spotlight artist or group that is featured on the cover page and they have a featured article within the magazine. Also within the magazines, there are a mix of other artists and groups that are previewed and there are local events that are advertised. Within the Earshot Jazz website, they have been archiving the magazines since 2011.

== Golden Ear Awards ==
In 1990, Earshot Jazz launched the Golden Ear Awards which showcases every year the achievements of local jazz artists in Seattle and also inducting impactful jazz artists into their Jazz Hall of Fame. This program gives an opportunity for jazz fans and performers to recognize the local jazz accomplishments of the past year.

=== Golden Ear Awards categories ===
- Induction into the Seattle Jazz Hall of Fame
- NW Recording of the Year
- NW Acoustic Jazz Ensemble of the Year
- Alternative Jazz Group of the Year
- NW Concert of the Year
- NW Jazz Instrumentalist of the Year
- Emerging Artist of the Year
- NW Vocalist of the Year
- Special Awards
