= Cadence Jazz Records =

American record company and label

Cadence Jazz
- Founded: 1980
- Founder: Bob Rusch
- Genre: Jazz
- Country of origin: U.S.
- Location: Redwood, New York
- Official website: www.cadencebuilding.com

Cadence Jazz is an American record company and label specializing in noncommercial modern jazz. It is associated with Cadence magazine.

Cadence Jazz was founded by Bob Rusch in Redwood, New York in 1980. By 2000 the label had issued more than 100 albums. Its catalogue includes Marilyn Crispell, Beaver Harris, and Frank Lowe. This label is different from the Cadence that produced pop music in the 1950s and 1960s.

== Artists ==
- Ahmed Abdullah
- Chet Baker
- Abdul Zahir Batin
- Borbetomagus
- Markus Burger
- Marilyn Crispell
- Bill Dixon
- Barbara Donald
- Dominic Duval
- Scott Fields
- Paul Flaherty
- Frode Gjerstad
- Beaver Harris
- Fred Hess
- Lindsey Horner
- Noah Howard
- Per Husby
- Paul Lovens
- Frank Lowe
- Kalaparusha Maurice McIntyre
- Don Menza
- Jemeel Moondoc
- Ivo Perelman
- Abbey Rader
- Saheb Sarbib
- Paul Smoker
- Glenn Spearman
- Roman Stolyar
- Thorgeir Stubø
- Bob Szajner
- Glenn Wilson
- Bobby Zankel

== Discography ==
Catalog #	Album	Artist	Notes
1000	Live at Ali's Alley	Ahmed Abdullah	lp only; w/ Vincent Chancey
1001	Big Band	Saheb Sarbib	lp only; w/ Jemeel Moondoc, Jack Walrath
1002		Beaver Harris	lp only; w/ Grachan Moncur, III, Maurice McIntyre
1003		Beaver Harris	lp only; w/ Don Pullen, Hamiet Bluiett, McIntyre
1004	Art of Bop	Hugh Brodie	lp only
1005			
1006	Live	Jemeel Moondoc	lp only; w/ Roy Campbell, Wm. Parker
1007		Frank Lowe	lp only; w/ Damon Choice, Butch Morris
1008	UFO	Saheb Sarbib	lp only; w/ Mark Whitecage
1009	Rams Run	Kalaparusha Maurice McIntyre	lp only; w/ Julius Hemphill, Malachi Thompson
1010	Aisha	Saheb Sarbib	lp only; big band w/ Jameel Moondoc, Frank Wright
1011	Olympia Live	Barbara Donald	lp only; w/ Carter Jefferson
1012		Kim Parker	lp only
1013	Bebop Loose & Live	J. R. Monterose	lp only
1014		Dwight James	lp only; w/ Byard Lancaster
1015	Spirit Music	Marilyn Crispell	lp only; w/ Billy Bang
1016	Rory Stuart Quartet	Rory Stuart	lp only
1017		Barbara Donald	lp only; w/ Carter Jefferson
1018	An Engineer of Sounds	Jimmy Stewart	lp only
1019	The Improviser	Chet Baker	
1020	Shapes Sounds Theory	Steve Cohn	lp only; w/ Reggie Workman
1021	OK!	Lee Shaw	lp only
1022	Chasin' a Classic	Bob Nell	lp only
1023	Impasse	Glenn Wilson, Harold Danko, Dennis Irwin, Adam Nussbaum	CD/LP
1024/25	Collection	Bill Dixon	
1026	Borbetomagus Jam	Borbetomagus	lp only; w/ Toshinori Kondo, Peter Kowald
1027	Rainsplash	Alan Simon	CD only
1028	Tough Tenor Red Hot	Ernie Krivda	lp only
1029	Sextet Live	Abdul Zahir Batin	lp only; w/ Bobby Watson, Robin Eubanks
1030	Rhythm-A-Ning	Thorgeir Stubø	lp only
1031	Red Green & Blue	Paula Owen	lp only
1032	Man with a Sax	Robert Shure	lp only; w/ Heikki Samanto
1033	Shades of Meaning	David Sidman	lp only; w/ Thurman Barker
1034	Scenario	Joe Locke	lp only; w/ Andy Laverne
1035	Chicplacity	Jon Hazilla	lp only; w/ John Hicks
1036	End of a Tune	Thorgeir Stubø	lp only; w/ Art Farmer, Doug Ramey
1037	Sonic Explorations	Matthew Shipp	lp only; w/ Rob Brown
1038	Nostalgia in Times Square	Peter Compo	lp only
1039	Well You Needn't	Ernie Krivda	lp only
1040	She's Back	Jan Labate	lp only
1041	Colour Circle	William Hooker	lp only; w/ Roy Campbell
1042	Endangered Species	Paul Flaherty	lp only
1043	Compelling Forces	Erroll Parker	lp only
1044	Setting the Standard	Ellery Eskelin	lp only
1045	Homecoming	Abbey Rader	CD only; w/ Dave Liebman
1046	Impact	Paul Flaherty	lp only
1047	What Is This Magic?	Paula Owen and Ron Enyard	from 1047 only in CD format
1048	Searching for Harmony	Alvaro Is Rojas	
1049			
1050	Seeking Spirit	Bobby Zankel	w/ Odeon Pope, Johnny Coles
1051	Innocence	Joe Gallivan	big band, w/ Evan Parker
1052	Home on the Range	Chuck Florence	w/ Jaki Byard, Alan Dawson
1053	Dreamland	Darrell Katz Jazz Composers Alliance	w/ Julius Hemphill
1054	Fat Onions	Paul Flaherty	
1055	Between Speech & Song	Eric Pakula	
1056	So Nice to Meet You	Ernie Krivda	
1057	All Stories Are True	David White	w/ Valery Ponomarev
1058	Bitten Moon	Jon Hazilla	
1059	Emerging from Earth	Bobby Zankel	w/ Uri Caine
1060	Is Waiting for You	Michael Pagan	
1061	Tonal Adventures	Alvaro Is Rojas	
1062	PoGressions	Lou Grassi	w/ Herb Robertson, Perry Robinson, Steve Swell
1063	Covert Choreography	Michael Bisio	
1064	48 Motives	Scott Fields	w/ Joseph Jarman, Marilyn Crispell
1065	Falling in Flat Space	Herb Robertson	w/ Dominic Duval
1066	Blue Monk Variations	Ivo Perelman	
1067		Tom Cohen	
1068	Last Detail	John Stevens	
1069	Seeing New York from the Ear	Frode Gjerstad	w/ Rashid Bakr, Wm. Parker
1070	Red Rope: 3 Pieces for 2 Players	George Cartwright	
1071	Passion Suite	Dale Fielder	
1072	Nightbird Inventions	Dominic Duval	solo bass
1073	Inside the Sphere	Mick Rossi	
1074	Velvet Heat	Pieter Ostrander	
1075	Great Concert, volume 1	Paul Plummer	
1076	Bendito of Santa Cruz	Ivo Perelman	with Matthew Shipp
1077	Encounters with Myself	Alvaro Is Rojas	
1078	Great Concert, volume 2	Paul Plummer	
1079	Essential Expressions	Paul Dumall	
1080	Suite Empathy	Ehran Elisha	w/ Roy Campbell
1081	Kith 'n Kin Orchestra	Thomas Borgmann	
1082	The Twilight of Time	Ken Simon	
1083	There Will Never Be Another You	Rick Holland	
1084	In Concert at Bimhuis	Noah Howard	w/ Bobby Few
1085	Bottoms Out	Joe Fonda	w/ Mark Whitecage
1086	No Train	Steuart Liebig	w/ Vinny Golia
1087	Shades of Greene	Burton Greene	solo
1088	Sweet Dreams	Pucci Amanda Jhones	w/ Kenny Barron
1089	Ikosa Mura	Frode Gjerstad	w/ Bobby Bradford, Borah Bergmann
1090	Toni's Delight: Live in Seoul	Heinz Geisser	w/ Guerino Mazzola
1091	Borealis	Frode Gjerstad	w/ the Circulasione Totale Orchestra
1092	Qu'a: Live at the Iridium, Vol. 1	Cecil Taylor	
1093	Only Believe	Don Glanden	w/ Ernie Watts
1094	The Free Improv Ensemble (1964)	The Free Improv Ensemble	w/ Burton Greene
1095	Second Course	Marc Sabatella	
1096	Positive Settings	Rick Holland	
1097	Live In Concert	Dominic Duval's String Ensemble	
1098	Qu'a Yuba: Live at the Iridium, Vol. 2	Cecil Taylor	
1099	Invisible Touch	Frode Gjerstad and Peter Brötzmann	
1100	Interludes of Breath and Substance	Matthew Goodheart with Leo Smith	
1101			
1102			
1103	Utterance	Glenn Spearman and John Heward	
1104	Hollywood Wedding	Adam Lane	
1105	The Dream Book	Joe McPhee and Dominic Duval	
1106	Rapture	Trio X with Rosi Hertlein	
1107	Anahad	Paul Flaherty and Randall Colbourne Quintet	
1108	Ultima	Frode Gjerstad Trio	
1109	Groundwork	Joe Rosenberg Group	
1110	Crossings	Matthew Goodheart & Dominic Duval	
1111	Cries and Whispers	Dominic Duval Quintet	
1112	Faith	Fred Hess / Boulder Creative Music Ensemble	
1113	Over the Edge	Tom DeSteno and Bob Magnuson	
1114			
1115			
1116			
1117	Knudstock 2000	Herb Robertson	
1118			
1119			
1120	Badlands	Expositions of Freedom . . . Now!	
1121			
1122	Heliopolis	Heinz Geisser / Guerino Mazzola Quartet	
1123	Calling All Spirits	Avram Fefer Trio	
1124/			
1125			
1126	The Blessing Light	Frode Gjerstad Trio	
1127	Primal Intentions	Michael Bisio and Joe Giardullo	
1128	Voluminous Venture	Masashi Harada and Barre Phillips	
1129	Antipodes	Steuart Liebig, Vinny Golia and Billy Mintz	
1130	Tierra	Mathias Rissi, Guerino Mazzola and Heinz Geisser	
1131			
1132			
1133	No(w) Music	Adam Lane's Full Throttle Orchestra	
1134	On Tour	Trio X	
1135			
1136	Caramel Topped Terrier	David Haney Quartet	
1137			
1138			
1139	Steve Swell Presents Particle Data Group	Steve Swell	
1140	Sound Quest	Implicate Order	
1141			
1142	Cycle Logical	Jimmy Halperin with Don Messina and Bill Chattin	
1143	Post-Deconstruction	Giancarlo Schiaffini and Peter Fraize	
1144	In Black and White	Trio X	
1145			
1146			
1147			
1148	One Eyed Jack	Joseph Scianni	
1149	A Place for Jazz	Lee Shaw Trio	
1150	Agua	Mathias Rissi, Guerino Mazzola and Heinz Geisser	
1151	Live in Paris	The Jemeel Moondoc All-Stars	
1152	Trips Jobs and Journeys	Noah Rosen	
1153	In, Thru, and Out	Jazz Composers Alliance Orchestra	
1154			
1155/56	Duocity in Brass & Wood	Paul Smoker	
1157			
1158	Cosmos	Abbey Rader and Dave Liebman	
1159	This Now!	Steve Swell's Unified Theory of Sound	
1160			
1161	The Welsh Chapel	Frode Gjerstad with John Edwards and Mark Sanders	
1162			
1163			
1164			
1165			
1166	Intuitive Structures	Kevin Norton's Living Language	
1167			
1168	Rapt Circle	Patrick Brennan	
1169	All the Notes	Cecil Taylor	
1170	Opening the Gates	James Finn	
1171			
1172			
1173	Composance	Michael Bisio Trio	
1174	Slammin' the Infinite	Steve Swell	
1175			
1176	WellSprings Suite	Quintet Moderne	
1177	Kaivalya Volume 1	Paul Flaherty and Marc Edwards	
1178			
1179			
1180	Long Night Waiting	The Gauci Trio	
1181			
1182			
1183	Beyond Is and Is Not	The Gauci Trio	
1184	Jack Rabbitt	Don Menza, John Bacon and Bobby Jones	
1185	In the Stillhouse	The Slam Trio	
1186	In Finland	Joe McPhee, Matthew Shipp and Dominic Duval	
1187	Eric Zinman Ensemble	Eric Zinman	
1188	Don't Count On Glory	Lindsey Horner	
1189	Big Hearts	Katsuyuki Itakura, Blaise Siwula and Ryusaku Ikezawa	
1190	We're Comin' Just One Time	The Gauci Trio	
1191	Live At Kaldi’s	Ron Enyard and Paula Owen with Cal Collins, Ed Felson	
1192	Live at the Guelph Festival	Marshall Allen and Lou Grassi	
1193	Buffalo	Adam Lane Quartet	
1194			
1195			
1196	Seth Meicht Trio	Seth Meicht Trio	
1197	Reqiphoenix Nexus	The C.T. Trio with Joe McPhee	
1198	Soul Calling	Ivo Perelman with Dominic Duval	
1199	Kaivalya Volume 2	Paul Flaherty and Marc Edwards	
1200	Roulette at Location One	Trio X	
