= OffsideOpen =

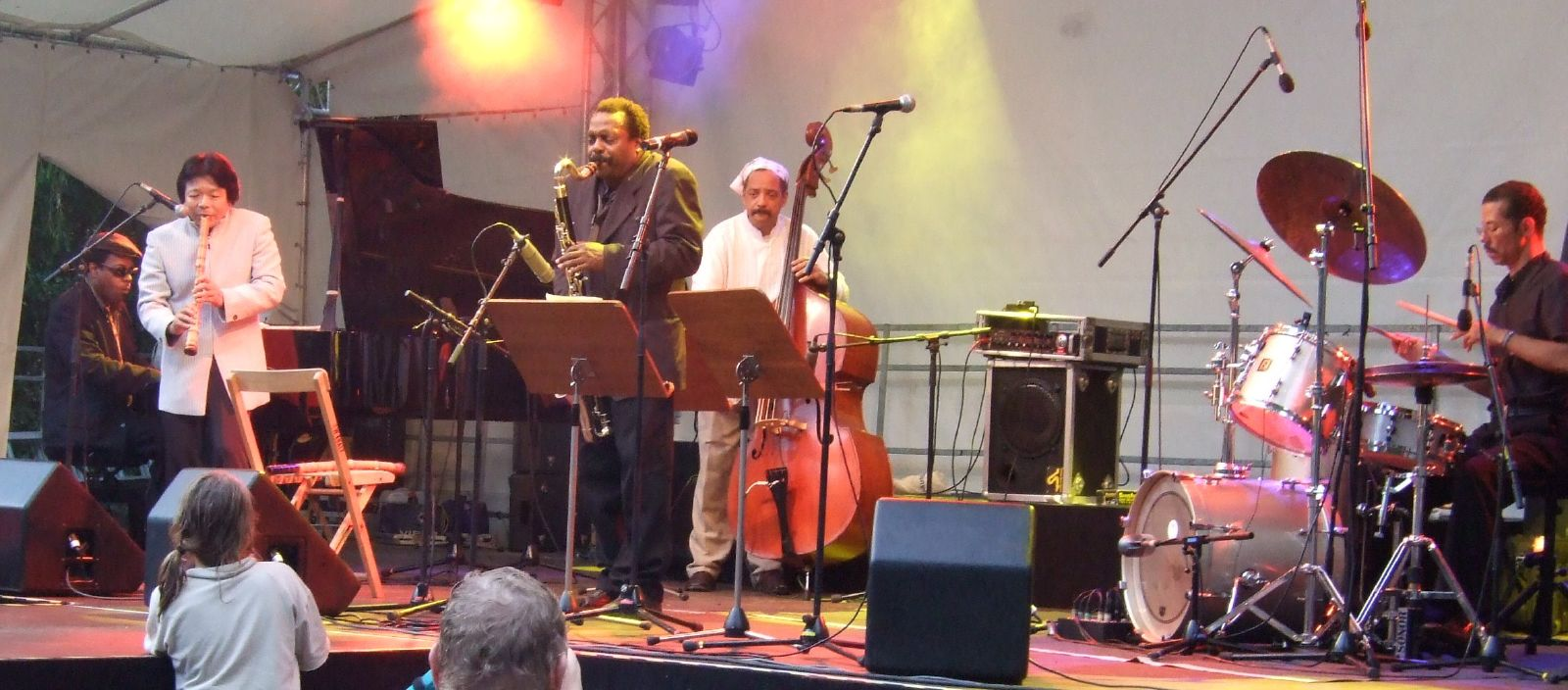
David Murray (middle left), Jaribu Shahid (middle), Marc Johnston (right), and Akikazu Nakamura (left) at OffsideOpen in 2007

OffsideOpen is a jazz festival in Germany.

The OffsideOpen International New Music Festival Gelderland, also known as Offside Festival, was a jazz festival in the German-Dutch border region. It was founded by Burkhard Hennen in 2007, and then took place again in 2008.

The three day festival in August was organizationally supported by the cities of Geldern, Straelen, as well as the dutch city of Arcen. The festival was financed by donations from private donors. Burkhard Hennen, founder and artistic director of the Moers Festival from 1972 to 2005, had a vision for a new type of festival. For example, instead of having fast food stands, like at the Moers Festival, volunteers served food from the Lower Rhine region. The 200+ volunteers help with the infrastructure and logistics of the festival, which helped Hennen in making his decision to support this specific festival out of all other initiatives.

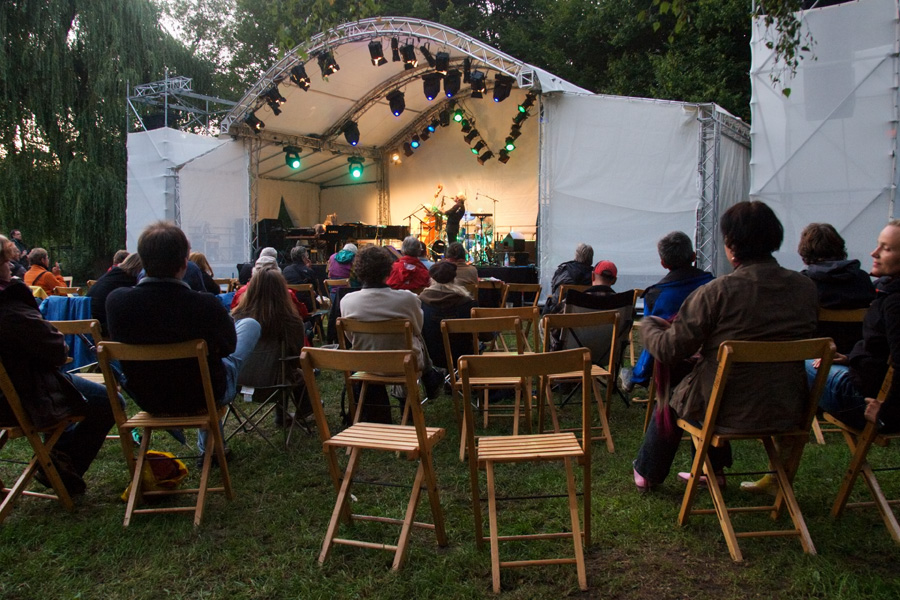
Offside Festival 2008, Mars Williams Quartet

From the 17th to the 19th of August, the festival took place on three different stages. More than 200 international musicians took part in the cross-border concert. A special attraction was the 40 or so membered Shibusashirazu Orchestra from Japan, who Henne had discovein Yokohama. The ensemble started off their European tour at the Offside Festival, additionally they stayed in the area for 5 days and held concerts, including one at a local school.

Hennen asked for the next festival to take place at a later date, because he was having difficulties with the finances. However, the other organizations were in favor of a yearly festival. For this reason, Hennen stepped down from his position of artistic director in July 2008, so Rainer Hannsen was appointed to fill this position. They then changed the name from OffsideOpen (Hennen's name) to Offside. Offside 2008 took place from 22nd to 24th of August on Holländer See with Gunter Hampel, Klaus Doldinger, Jazzkantine, Mars Williams, among many other musicians. The festival was no longer able to continue the following years due to many sponsors dropping out.
