= In Black and White (Trio X album) =

Live album by Trio X
- Released: 2002
- Recorded: October 1999 at Edgefest '99 in Ann Arbor, MI and June 6, 2001 at the Vision Festival in NYC
- Genre: Jazz
- Length: 72:40
- Label: Cadence Jazz CJR 1144
- Producer: Joe McPhee and Dominic Duval

Joe McPhee chronology
On Tour (2001)	In Black and White (2002)	Remembrance (2001)

In Black and White (subtitled On Tour...Ann Arbor/NYC) is a live album by multi-instrumentalist Joe McPhee's Trio X featuring bassist Dominic Duval and percussionist Jay Rosen recorded in Ann Arbor, Michigan in 1999 and at the Vision Festival in NYC in 2001 and released on the Cadence Jazz label in 2002.

== Reception ==
Professional ratings
Review scores
Source	Rating
Allmusic	3/5 stars
The Penguin Guide to Jazz Recordings	3/4 stars

Allmusic reviewer Steve Loewy states "When they are "on," the members of Trio X play music that is as good as it gets, and evidence of that is amply abundant here, with some important and exciting interpretations".

== Track listing ==
All compositions by Joe McPhee, Domenic Duval and Jay Rosen except as indicated

1. "Intro: God Bless the Child" (Billie Holiday, Arthur Herzog, Jr.) - 7:55
2. "'Round Midnight and Later" - 13:59
3. "Going Home" (Antonín Dvořák) - 8:16
4. "Blood at the Root" - 16:35
5. "Sida's Song" - 17:54
6. "Wait Until Evening" - 8:01

== Personnel ==
- Joe McPhee - saxophone
- Dominic Duval - bass
- Jay Rosen - drums, percussion
