= Cadence (magazine) =

American music magazine

- Cadence Vol. 29 No. 4, cover dated April 2003
- Coordinating Editor: David Haney
- Former editors: Bob Rusch
- Categories: Jazz & blues magazine
- Frequency: Quarterly
- Publisher: David Haney
- Founder: Bob Rusch
- Founded: 1976
- Final issue: January 2012 (print edition)
- Company: Cadence Magazine, LLC
- Country: United States
- Based in: Richland, Oregon
- Language: English
- Website: www.cadencejazzworld.com
- ISSN: 0162-6973

Cadence: The Independent Journal of Creative Improvised Music is a quarterly review of jazz, blues and improvised music. The magazine covers a range of styles, from early jazz and blues to the avant-garde. Critic and historian Bob Rusch founded the magazine as a monthly in 1976 and served as publisher and coordinating editor through 2011. Musician David Haney became editor and publisher in 2012.

== History and profile ==
Cadence began publication in 1976. The magazine's original parent company, Cadnor, Ltd. (based in Redwood, New York), also owns a pair of jazz record labels (CIMP and Cadence Jazz), a record distributorship (Cadence/North Country), and an audio equipment retailer (Northcountry Audio). The magazine was published monthly until October 2007, when it switched to a quarterly schedule with an increase in pages.

In January 2011, Bob Rusch announced that Cadence would cease publication with the October–December 2011 issue, while other endeavors, such as CIMP, Cadence Jazz, and North Country would continue. However, in August, the Cadence email newsletter announced that the magazine would continue, under new leadership, after 2011 (all other Cadence and North Country businesses would remain under the current management). In October, Cadence announced that David Haney, a jazz musician and Cadence contributor based in Richland, Oregon, would become publisher. In January 2012, the format changed to an online magazine (in PDF), with an annual print edition.

The All Music Guide to Jazz described Cadence as "the premier magazine about improvised music in the world... Cadence's oral history/interview/profiles each month are thorough and no-holds-barred... The magazine is not to be missed."
