= Sabir Mateen =

American musician and composer

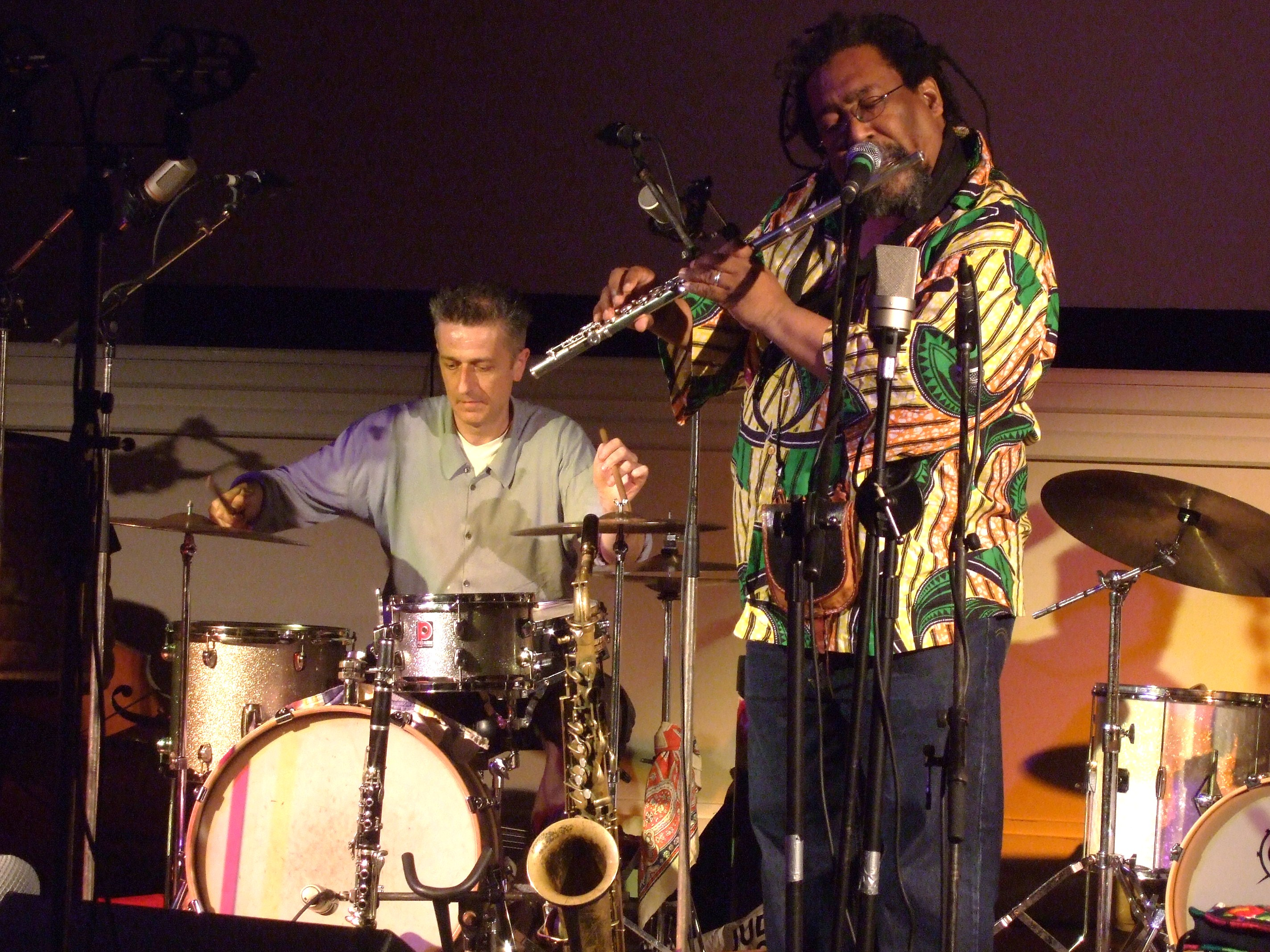
- Sabir Mateen playing flute with drummer Steve Noble

Background information
- Born: Sabir Mateen; April 16, 1951 (age 74); Philadelphia, Pennsylvania, U.S.
- Genres: Avant-garde jazz idiom
- Occupation: Musician
- Instruments: Tenor, alto saxophone, B♭, alto clarinet, flute
- Website: www.sabirmateen.com

Sabir Mateen (born April 16, 1951) is an American musician and composer from Philadelphia. His musical style is primarily avant-garde jazz. He plays tenor and alto saxophone, B♭ and alto clarinet, and flute.

As a young man, Mateen was originally a percussionist, and he started playing flute as a teenager. From there he moved to alto and then tenor saxophone. He started out playing rhythm and blues in the early 1970s which led him to the tenor saxophone chair of the Horace Tapscott Pan Afrikan Peoples Arkestra. He has performed or recorded with musicians including Cecil Taylor, Sunny Murray, William Parker, Alan Silva, Butch and Wilber Morris, Raphe Malik, Steve Swell, Roy Campbell, Jr., Matthew Shipp, Marc Edwards, Jemeel Moondoc, William Hooker, Henry Grimes, Rashid Bakr, and Hamid Drake. He is a member of the band TEST, with Daniel Carter.

== Discography ==
=== As leader/co-leader ===
- Tom Bruno, Sabir Mateen: Gettin' Away with Murder (Eremite, 1995)
- One World Ensemble: Breathing Together (Freedom, 1995)
- Divine Mad Love (Eremite, 1998)
- Sunny Murray w/ Sabir Mateen: We Are Not at the Opera (Eremite, 1998)
- Hamid Drake & Sabir Mateen: Brothers Together (Eremite, 2000)
- Sabir Mateen, Ben Karetnick: Sun Xing (JMZ, 2001)
- Secrets of When (Bleu Regard, 2001)
- Frode Gjerstad / Sabir Mateen: Good Question (FMR, 2005)
- Sabir Mateen - Daniel Carter - Andrew Barker - Not On Earth ... In Your Soul! (Qbico, 2005)
- Other Places, Other Spaces (Nu Bop, 2005)
- Sunny Murray w/ Sabir Mateen: Perles Noires (Eremite, 2005)
- Prophecies Come To Pass (577 Records, 2006)
- William Hooker / Sabir Mateen "Dharma" (KMB Jazz, 2007)
- Urdla XXX (Not Two, 2010)
- Sabir Mateen / Matthew Shipp: SAMA (Not Two, 2010)
- Sabir Mateen / Frode Gjerstad featuring Steve Swell: Sound Gathering (Not Two, 2010)
- Sabir Mateen / Matthew Shipp: SaMa Live in Moscow (SoLyd, 2011)
- The Sabir Mateen Jubilee Ensemble (Not Two, 2013)
- Blood Trio: Understory (Not Two, 2013)
- JOYS! (577 Records, 2016)

=== With Test ===
- Test (Estatic Peace, 1996)
- Ahead (Now Jazz/Ramwong, 1997)
- Test (Aum Fidelity, 1998)
- Live (Eremite, 1998)

=== As sideman ===
With Hamid Drake

- Bindu (Rogueart, 2005)

With Marc Edwards

- Red Sprite & Blue Jets (CIMP, 1997)

With William Hooker

- Yearn for Certainty (Engine Records, 2010)

With Raphe Malik

- ConSequences (Eremite, 1999)
- Looking East: A Suite in Three Parts (Boxholder, 2001)

With William Parker

- Spontaneous (Splasc(H), 2002)
- For Percy Heath (Victo, 2005)

With Samo Salamon

- Joy and Sorrow (Klopotec Records, 2022)

With Matthew Shipp

- Our Lady of the Flowers (RogueArt, 2015)

With Alan Silva

- Alan Silva & the Sound Visions Orchestra (Eremite, 2001)
- H.Con.Res.57/Treasure Box (Eremite, 2003)

With Steve Swell

- Slammin' the Infinite (Cadence Jazz, 2004)
- Remember Now (Not Two, 2006)
- Live @ the Vision Festival (Not Two, 2007)
- News from the Mystic Auricle (Not Two, 2008)
- 5000 Poems (Not Two, 2010)

With Earth People

- Waking The Living (Undivided Vision Records, 2001)
- Simple...Ins't It?? (Undivided Vision Records, 2003)
- Sky Readers (Undivided Vision Records, 2003)
- Now Is Rising (Undivided Vision Records, 2005)
- Bang! (Undivided Vision Records, 2007)
