= Jackson Krall =

American drummer

Jackson Krall Jr. (born October 12, 1949) is a drum maker.

Born in Detroit, through the years Jackson's instruments have found their way into the hands of the world's greatest drummers and percussionists, and can be heard on recordings as well as in live performance by many bands, orchestras, and the most popular Broadway and Off-Broadway shows like "Lion King" and "Blue Man Group". In 1984, under the leadership of Toni and Celia Nogueira, Jackson was a founding member and helped write the bylaws of New York's first samba school, the Empire Loisaida Samba School (Escola de Samba Empire Loisaida).
