= Luminous Axis =

Studio album by Wadada Leo Smith
- Released: tracks 1–12: August 18, 2002 tracks 13–15: August 8, 2002
- Studio: tracks 1–12: Mills College, Oakland, California tracks 13–15: Frank Booth, Brooklyn
- Genre: Jazz
- Length: 54:45
- Label: Tzadik
- Producer: Wadada Leo Smith

Wadada Leo Smith chronology
The Year of the Elephant (2002)	Luminous Axis (2002)	Organic Resonance (2003)

Luminous Axis (subtitled The Caravans of Winter and Summer) is an album by American jazz trumpeter Wadada Leo Smith which was recorded in 2002 and released on the Tzadik Records' Composer Series. The album includes an extended suite for four laptops and trumpet, two duets with Ikue Mori and a composition featuring the percussionist William Winant.

== Reception ==
Professional ratings
Review scores
Source	Rating
AllMusic	4.5/5 stars
The Penguin Guide to Jazz	3/4 stars

In his review for AllMusic, arwulf arwulf notes, "Wadada Leo Smith is a master of improvisation who balances sound and silence with a combination of theatrical freedom and ritualistic discipline that can be breathtaking."

The Penguin Guide to Jazz says, "A suite of miniatures and longer improvisations, with the trumpet keening out across spare, almost subliminal electronics background."

The All About Jazz review by Farrell Lowe states, "Luminous Axis should draw emphatic interest from listeners curious about the exploration of modern compositional style and performance. It's simply brilliant."

== Track listing ==
All compositions by Wadada Leo Smith

1. "Garden of the Heart" – 5:20
2. "Perfect Essence" – 0:33
3. "Radiant Light Gushing from the Sun" – 2:37
4. "Night Splendor, A Certain Moon Flow" – 1:25
5. "Tango" – 0:45
6. "Beauty" – 0:15
7. "Fountain (Inmortality)" – 4:28
8. "Garden of the Soul" – 3:50
9. "Apples, Dates and Pomegranates" – 1:27
10. "Light, Ginger, Olives and Musk" – 2:35
11. "Harp: A Gleaming Sama" – 2:17
12. "Fountain (Lore)" – 5:08
13. "Camphor" – 3:52
14. "Caravans of Winter and Summer" – 15:15
15. "The Traveler" – 4:58

== Personnel ==
- Wadada Leo Smith – trumpet and flugelhorn with electronics
- John Bischoff, Chris Brown, Ikue Mori, Tim Perkis, Mark Trayle – computer-driven electronics
- William Winant – percussion
