= Scot Gresham-Lancaster =

American composer

Scot Gresham-Lancaster (born 1954 in Redwood City, California) is an American composer, performer, instrument builder, educator and educational technology specialist. He uses computer networks to create new environments for musical and cross discipline expression. As a member of The Hub, he is one of the early pioneers of "computer network" music, which uses the behavior of interconnected music machines to create innovative ways for performers and computers to interact. He performed in a series of "co-located" performances, collaborating in real time with live and distant dancers, video artists and musicians in network-based performances.

As a student, he studied with Philip Ianni, Roy Harris, Darius Milhaud, John Chowning, Robert Ashley, Terry Riley, Robert Sheff, David Cope, and Jack Jarret, among others. In the late 1970s, he worked closely with Serge Tcherepnin, helping with the construction and distribution of Serge's Serge Modular Music System. He went on to work at Oberheim Electronics. In the early 1980s, he was the technical director at the Mills College Center for Contemporary Music. He has taught at California State University, Hayward, Diablo Valley College, Ex'pression College for Digital Arts, Cogswell College, and San Jose State University. He taught at University of Texas at Dallas in the School of Arts Technology and Emerging Communication (ATEC) until 2017, and is currently a Visiting Researcher at CNMAT, UC Berkeley. He is also a Research Scientist at the ArtSci Lab at ATEC.

He was a composer in residence at Mills College Center for Contemporary Music. At STEIM in Amsterdam, he has worked to develop new families of controllers to be used exclusively in the live performance of electroacoustic music. He is an alumnus of the Djerassi Artist Residency Program. He has toured and recorded as a member of The Hub, Room (with Chris Brown, Larry Ochs and William Winant), Alvin Curran, ROVA saxophone quartet, the Club Foot Orchestra, and the Dutch ambient group NYX. He has performed the music of Alvin Curran, Pauline Oliveros, John Zorn, and John Cage, under their direction, and worked as a technical assistant to Lou Harrison, Iannis Xenakis, David Tudor, Edmund Campion, Cindy Cox and among many others.

Since 2006, he has collaborated with media artist Stephen Medaris Bull in a series of "karaoke cellphone operas" with initial funding provided by New York State Council for the Arts. He has worked in collaboration with Dallas theater director Thomas Riccio developing sonic interventions for many of his productions.

== Publications ==
- Experiences in Digital Terrain: Using Digital Elevation Models for Music and Interactive Multimedia
- The Aesthetics and History of the Hub: The Effects of Changing Technology on Network Computer Music
- Mixing in the Round
- Flying Blind: Network and feedback based systems in real time interactive music performances
- No There, There: A personal history of telematic performance

== Discography ==
- The HUB: Boundary Layer (3-CD retrospective) Tzadik TZ 8050-3
- Orchestrate Clang Mass, solo work Live Interactive Electronics (1983-2001) (2003 OCM publishing)
- Fuzzybunny with Chris Brown and Tim Perkis Sonore 2001
- The HUB: Wrecking Ball (Hub 2nd CD) Artifact 010
- Yearbook Vol. 1 Track 5 Rastascan
- Nonstop Flight (HUB with Deep Listening Band) Music and Arts
- Metropolis (Clubfoot Orchestra)
- Voys vol.1 (Voys)
- Electric Rags New Albion
- NYX Axis Mundi (with Bert Barten) Lotus Records
- Gino Robair: Other Destinations Rastascan Records
- Vol. 17 CDCM Computer Music Series (Chain reaction) CDCM
- Room (Hall of Mirrors) Music and Art
- The HUB: Computer Network Music, Artifact 002
- Talking Drum: Chris Brown, Pogus 21034
