= Takashi Kako =

- Born: 31 January 1947 (age 79); Osaka, Japan
- Genres: Jazz, Classical music, Contemporary classical music
- Occupations: Musician, composer
- Instrument: Piano
- Labels: America, Trio
- Website: Takashi Kako Official Site

Takashi Kako (加古 隆, Kako Takashi) (born 31 January 1947) is a Japanese pianist and composer, who works in both jazz and art-music idioms.

== Early life ==
Kako was born in Osaka. He began playing piano at eight years old and learned to play jazz while in his teens.

== Later life and career ==
He attended the Tokyo University of Fine Arts and Music, receiving both his bachelor's (1965-1969) and master's in composition (1971) there. Upon graduating, he matriculated at the Paris Conservatoire, where he studied composition under Olivier Messiaen; concurrently, he played jazz in clubs, beginning a long-term association with Kent Carter and Oliver Johnson as a trio. He played with Noah Howard, Masahiko Togashi, and Steve Lacy in the 1970s, and with Togashi again as a duo in the early 1980s. Starting in the mid-1980s, he increasingly moved toward playing solo piano, although he occasionally toured with ensembles as well.

In addition to his performance career, Kako has worked extensively as a composer. He has written scores for traditional ensembles and for film and television, including the 1998 film The Quarry.

== Discography ==
=== As Emergency ===
(with Bob Reid, Boulou Ferré, Glenn Spearman, Sabu Toyozumi)

- Homage to Peace (America, 1973) - Recorded in 1972

=== As leader/co-leader ===
- Jazz A Maison De Japon, Paris (パリ日本館コンサート) with Mototeru Takagi (Nadja, 1974) - live
- Passage (パッサージュ) (Trio, 1976)
- Micro World (マイクロワールド) (Trio, 1976)
- Paris Days (巴里の日) (Trio, 1977) - recorded in 1976
- Night Music (Sun, 1977) - recorded in 1974
- Legend of The Sea-Myself (海の伝説―私) (Trio, 1977) - live
- TOK with Oliver Johnson, Kent Carter (Trio, 1978)
- El Al with Toshiyuki Miyama and his New Herd (Union, 1979)
- Valencia with Masahiko Togashi (Trio, 1980)
- L'Aube (夜明け) (Baybridge, 1984)
- Twilight Monologues with Masahiko Sato, Aki Takase, Ichiko Hashimoto (Lunatic, 1984)
- Solo Concert (Insights, 1985)
- Poesie (CBS/Sony, 1986)
- Klee (いにしえの響き - パウル・クレーの絵のように) (CBS/Sony, 1986)
- Scrawl (CBS/Sony, 1987)
- Kenji (CBS/Sony, 1988)
- Long Journey (幻想行) (CBS/Sony, 1989)
- Symphonic Poem: Spring: Homage to Flowers (春～花によせて) (CBS/Sony, 1990)
- Estampe Sonore (CBS/Sony, 1991)
- Apocalypse (アポカリプス 〜黙示録) (Sony/Epic, 1992)
- La Collection de l'art du vent (風の画集) (Sony/Epic, 1992)
- Prelude De L'Eau (水の前奏曲) (TriStar Music, 1993)
- Norwegian Wood (ノルウェーの森) (Epic/Sony, 1996)
- Presentimen (予感 アンジェリック グリーンの光の中で) (Sony/Epic, 1998)
- Moments Tranquilles (静かな時間) (Sony, 1999)
- Waltz With The Wind (風のワルツ) (Sony, 2004)
- Piano (Takashi Kako album) (Avex Classics, 2006)
- Kumano (熊野古道) (Avex-Classics, 2007)
- Qualtet (Avex Classics, 2010)
- Blue Sea (滄) with Mototeru Takagi, Sabu Toyozumi (Kaitai, 2012)
- New Sea (新海) with Mototeru Takagi, Sabu Toyozumi (Kaitai, 2012)

=== Soundtracks ===
- NHK Special The 20th Century In Moving Images (映像の世紀) Original Soundtrack (Escalier, 1995; Excerpt on YouTube)
- Original Soundtrack From The Motion Picture The Quarry (月の虹) (Sony Music Media, 1998)
- Shiki-Jitsu (式日) Original Soundtrack (Studio Kajino, 2000)
- A Single Drop of Water in a Mighty River (大河の一滴) Original Soundtrack (Toho, 2001)
- Letters from the Mountains (阿弥陀堂だより) Original Soundtrack (Toho, 2002)
- The Great White Tower (白い巨塔) Original Soundtrack (Fuji TV, 2004)
- Best Wishes for Tomorrow (明日への遺言) Original Soundtrack (Avex Trax, 2008)
- Homeland (家路) Original Soundtrack (2014)
