= Chris Brown (composer) =

American classical composer

Chris Brown (born 1953) is an American composer, pianist and electronic musician, who creates music for acoustic instruments with interactive electronics, for computer networks, and for improvising ensembles. He was active early in his career as an inventor and builder of electroacoustic instruments; he has also performed widely as an improviser and pianist with groups as "Room" and the "Glenn Spearman Double Trio." In 1986 he co-founded the pioneering computer network music ensemble "The Hub". He is also known for his recorded performances of music by Henry Cowell, Luc Ferrari, and John Zorn. He has received commissions from the Berkeley Symphony, the Rova Saxophone Quartet, the Abel-Steinberg-Winant Trio, the Gerbode Foundation, the Phonos Foundation and the Creative Work Fund. His recent music includes the poly-rhythm installation "Talking Drum", the "Inventions" series for computers and interactive performers, and the radio performance "Transmissions" series, with composer Guillermo Galindo.

His 1992 electroacoustic work "Lava", for brass, percussion, and electronics is produced by Tzadik Records. He teaches Composition and Electronic Music at Mills College in Oakland, where he is co-director of the Center for Contemporary Music (CCM).

== Discography ==
- 1980 "Earwig" with instrument builder Tom Nunn, cassette released by Essential Recordings, 16mm film by Eric Marin.
- 1985 Wayne Horvitz: Dinner at Eight (Dossier)
- 1989 "Snakecharmer" Live Electroacoustic Music by Chris Brown, Artifact Recordings, CD.
- 1989 "Room", Sound Aspects, CD.
- 1989 "The Hub: Computer Network Music" Artifact Recordings, CD.
- 1991 "The Virtuoso in the Computer Age -- I: CDCM Computer Music Series, vol. 10", piano performance, Centaur Records, CD
- 1992 Room: "Hall of Mirrors", Music and Arts. CD.
- 1993 Glenn Spearman Double Trio: "Mystery Project", piano and electronics performance, Black Saint, CD.
- 1994 "Music from the CCM at Mills College: CDCM Computer Music Series, vol. 17", Centaur Records, CD.
- 1994 Glenn Spearman Double Trio: "Smokehouse", piano performance, Black Saint, CD.
- 1994 The Hub: "Wreckin' Ball", Computer Network Music, Artifact Recordings, CD.
- 1995 "Conductions #11" by Butch Morris, original instruments performance, New World, CD.
- 1995 "In C" by Terry Riley The 25th Anniversary Performance, keyboard performance, New Albion Records, CD.
- 1995 "Lava" by Chris Brown, for brass, percussion and live electronics, Tzadik, CD.
- 1996 "Duets", by Chris Brown, with Tom Nunn, William Winant, Ikue Mori, and Tom Djll, Artifact Recordings, CD.
- 1996 Larry Ochs "The Secret Magritte", piano performance in ensemble including the Rova Saxophone Quartet, Marilyn Crispell, Barry Guy, Lisle Ellis, and William Winant, Black Saint, CD.
- 1996 Glenn Spearman The Fields, Black Saint
- 1997 Rova's 1995 Live Recording of John Coltrane's "Ascension", piano performance in large ensemble including the Rova Saxophone Quartet, Black Saint, CD.
- 1998 "Cellule 75", piano performance with William Winant, percussion of Luc Ferrari's composition, Tzadik CD.
- 1998 "Non Stop Flight", electronic performance with The Hub on this live recording by the Deep Listening Band, Music & Arts, CD.
- 1999 "New Music: Piano Compositions by Henry Cowell", piano performances by Chris Brown, New Albion Records, CD.
- 1999 "Waves", composition and performance with Philip Gelb, shakuhachi on "between/waves", Sparkling Beatnik, CD.
- 1999 Glenn Spearman's Blues for Falasha, piano performance with the Glenn Spearman Double Trio, Tzadik, CD.
- 2000 Xu Feng, electronics performance with a sextet of John Zorn’s game piece, Tzadik, CD.
- 2001 "fuzzybunny", live electronic improvisations with the trio by the same name which also includes Tim Perkis and Scot Gresham-Lancaster, Sonore, CD.
- 2001 "Oasis", opening track of a live computer music performance titled "knottyspine", on a compilation of music by composers from Mills College, including Fred Frith, Pauline Oliveros, Maggi Payne, John Bischoff, and Alvin Curran, CD.
- 2001 "Talking Drum", binaural recordings of live electronic installations, and location recordings of traditional music and environmental soundscapes, Sonore, CD.
- 2002 "Branches", recordings of "Invention#7", and "Alternating Currents", on Ecstatic Peace, LP.
- 2002 "Transmission Temescal", binaural recording of installation of 20 boomboxes and clock radios on the decks of the Artship, the Artship Recordings, disc 47.
- 2002 "Water", live electronics with Philip Gelb, shakuhachi, on "Visions: Performances form the EMIT series compilation CD.
- 2003 "Headlands - Natto Quartet", extended piano improvisations with Philip Gelb, shakuhachi; Shoko Hikage, koto; and Tim Perkis, electronics, on 482 Music, CD.
- Electric Ascension by Rova::Orchestrova, the Rova Saxophone Quartet augmented by a group of electronic musicians (Atavistic, 2005)
- 2005 "Rogue Wave", by Chris Brown electronic and acoustic compositions "Rogue Wave", "Transmission Tenderloin", "Retroscan", "Flies", "Cloudsteams/Bellwethers" and "Alternating Currents" . With Eddie Def, William Winant, Julie Steinberg et al.
- 2007 "Cutter Heads", piano and electronics; with Fred Frith, acoustic and electric guitar, Intakt Records, CD.
- 2016 "Six Primes", Piano, New World Records, CD.
