= Lisle Ellis =

Canadian jazz bassist and composer

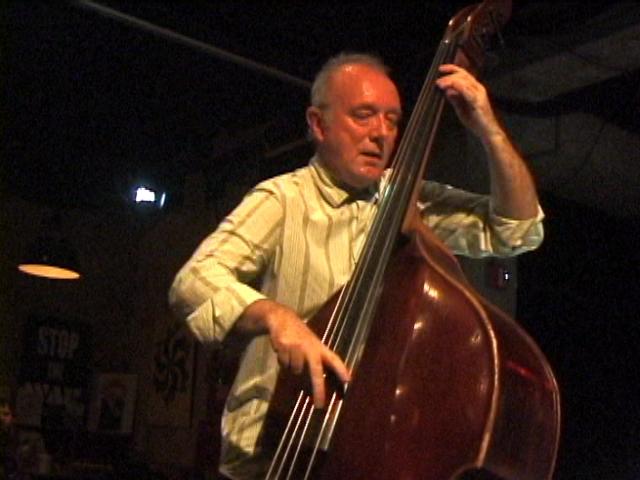
- Ellis at The Living Theatre, New York City, 2008

Background information
- Also known as: L. S. Lansall-Ellis
- Born: Lyle Steve Lansall; 17 November 1951 (age 74); Campbell River, British Columbia, Canada
- Genres: Jazz, avant-garde jazz, free jazz, free improvisation
- Occupations: Musician, composer
- Instruments: Double bass, bass guitar
- Labels: Black Saint, Music & Arts, CIMP
- Formerly of: What We Live
- Website: www.lisleellis.com

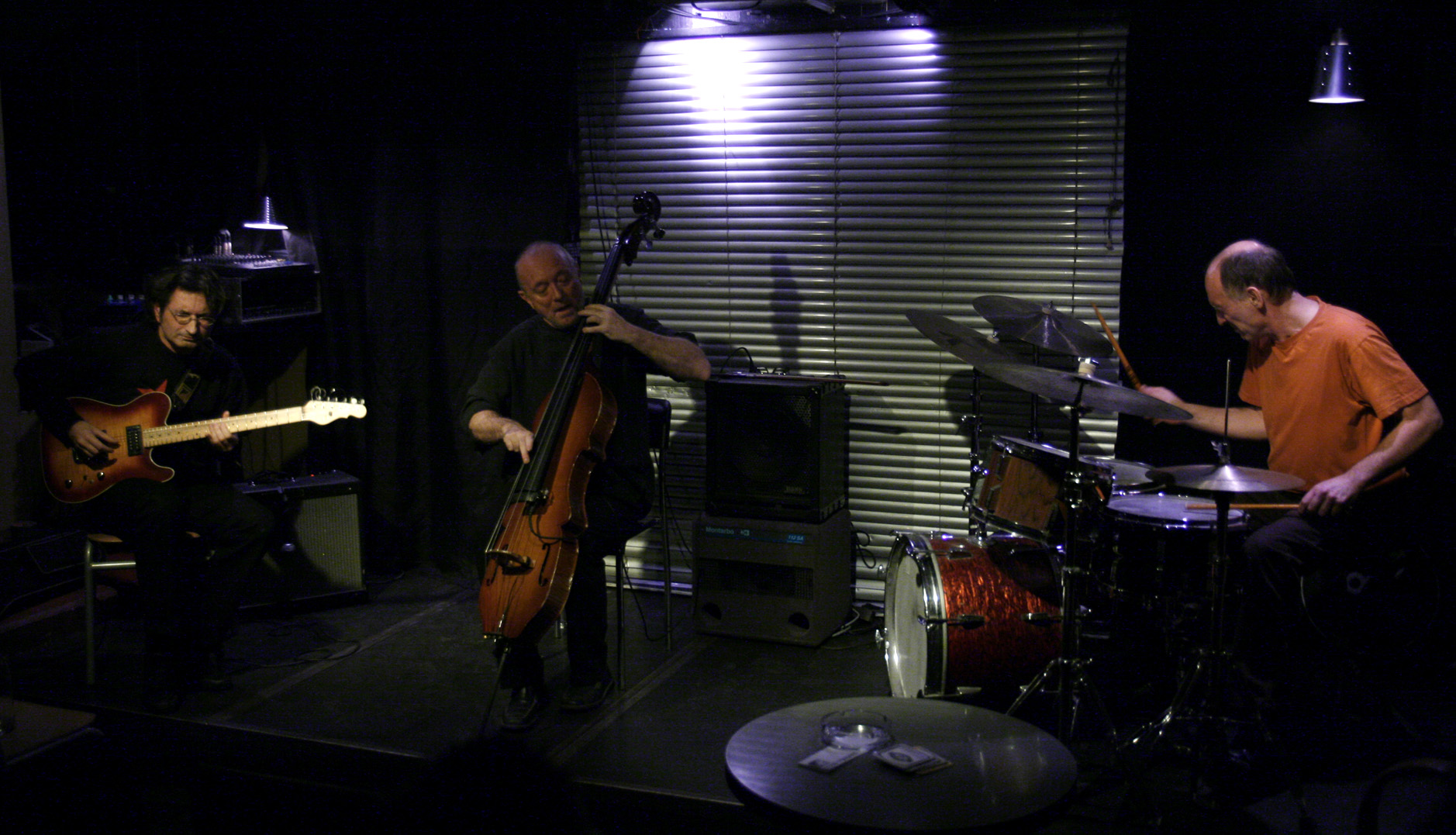
Ellis with Wolfgang Reisinger and Andy Manndorff in 2008

Lisle Ellis (born November 17, 1951) is a Canadian jazz bassist and composer who is known for his improvisational style and use of electronics.

== Biography ==
Ellis was born in Campbell River, British Columbia. Ellis began playing electric bass in his teens and worked professionally from an early age in numerous environments including studios, radio & TV shows, and strip clubs. He was born Lyle Steve Lansall, but used his initials L. S. as his stage name Ellis; he also used the name L. S. Lansall-Ellis professionally.

Ellis studied at the Vancouver Academy of Music with Walter Robertson and attended Douglas College in Vancouver. He later studied at the Creative Music Studio in New York City from 1975-1979.

Ellis lived in Toronto, Ontario, Canada from 1982 until 1983 and then Montreal, Quebec, Canada from 1983 until 1992. In 1986 Ellis was the first recipient of Canada's Fred Stone Award, given annually to a musician for integrity and innovation. In the early 1980s in Vancouver, and the late 80's in Montreal, Ellis was a conspicuous activator of musician alliance organizations, performance venues, and concert series presentations. One collective in particular, Vancouver's New Orchestra Workshop, is still active nearly thirty years later.

After moving to the United States in 1992, he settled in San Francisco, working with Glenn Spearman from 1992 until 2001. He lived in San Diego from 2001–2005 and New York City from 2005 to the present. In 1994, he was a member of the Cecil Taylor band for a brief tour of California.

Ellis's discography includes performances with Peter Brötzmann, Andrew Cyrille, Joe McPhee, Dave Douglas, Glenn Spearman and about 40 recordings for Music & Arts, Black Saint, DIW, Hat Art, New World, and Victo. His 1989 album, Kaleidoscopes: The Ornette Coleman Songbook, with pianist Paul Plimley, was given five stars in Down Beat magazine.

Since the late 1990s, Ellis has been primarily focused on developing an electro-acoustic interface he calls "bass & circuitry". By 2008, with the completion of a template for this interface Ellis turned his attention back to acoustic music projects with an emphasis on jazz based improvisation and to finding a balance between his electronic and acoustic music interests.

Central to Ellis's music, and a vehicle for both his electronic and acoustic experiments, has been his long standing trio with Larry Ochs and Donald Robinson called What We Live. Di Terra, an Italy-based trio with Alberto Braida (piano), and Fabrizio Spera (drums), has been an exclusively acoustic music vehicle for Ellis. His experimental trio Audible Means with Ellery Eskelin (saxophone), and Erik Deutsch (keyboards), was active on the New York scene in 2006 and 2007 and was a focal point for Ellis's bass & circuitry explorations. Since his arrival in New York, collaborations and interactions with composer/electronic musician Tom Hamilton have also been important to Ellis's work in electronic music.

== Discography ==
- 1995 Elevations (Victo)
- 1998 Children in Peril Suite (Music & Arts)
- 2008 Sucker Punch Requiem (Henceforth)

With Paul Plimley

- 1990 Both Sides of the Same Mirror (Nine Winds)
- 1991 When Silence Pulls (Music & Arts)
- 1992 Kaleidoscopes (HatArt)
- 1992 Noir (Victo)
- 1994 Density of the Lovestruck Demons (Music & Arts)
- 1994 Sweet Freedom Now What? (HatArt)
- 1999 Safecrackers (Victo)

With Glenn Spearman

- 1994/95 Free Worlds (Black Saint) released in 2000
- 1996 The Fields (Black Saint)
- 1997 Let It Go [Red Toucan)
- 1999 Blues for Falasha (Tzadik)

With What We Live

- 1995 What We Live (DIW)
- 1996 What We Live Fo(u)r (Black Saint)
- 1999 Trumpets (Black Saint)
- 1999 Quintet for a Day (New World)
- 2002 On Tour in France (Metalanguage)

With Sound on Survival

- 2004 American Roadwork (CIMP)
- 2004 Live at Spruce Street Forum (Botticelli)
- 2005 Live (Henceforth)

With others

- 1978–79 New Orchestra Quintet: Collected Recordings
- 1982 Paul Cram: Blue Tales in Time (Onari)
- 1995 Larry Ochs: The Secret Magritte (Black Saint)
- 1995 Rova Saxophone Quartet: John Coltrane's Ascension (Black Saint)
- 1996 Ben Goldberg: Eight Phrases for Jefferson Rubin (Victo)
- 1996 India Cooke: Redhanded (Music & Arts)
- 1996 Matthew Goodheart with Glenn Spearman, Lisle Ellis, Donald Robinson: Sonoluminescence (Nine Winds)
- 1999 Patrick Brennan: Saunters, Walks, Ambles (CIMP)
- 2002 Marcos Fernandes: Hybrid Vigor (Accretions)
- 2002 Marcos Fernandes Pictures in Sound (Accretions)
- 2005? Lisle Ellis/Oliver Lake/Paul Smoker/Scott R. Looney: Urban Rumination (META)
- 2006 Alberto Braida/Lisle Ellis/Fabrizio Spera: Di Terra (Nu Bop)
- 2010 Kirk Knuffke/Kenny Wollesen/Lisle Ellis: Chew Your Food (NoBusiness)
