= Tim Perkis =

American experimental musician

Tim Perkis is an experimental musician and writer who works with live electronic and computer sound.

== Discography ==
"Boundary Layer" 2008 The Hub with John Bischoff, Chris Brown, Tim Perkis, Scot Gresham-Lancaster, Phil Stone. Tzadik Records (New York). CD.

"Grosse Abfahrt: Luftschiffe zum Kalifornien" 2007 Serge Baghdassarians – electronics; Boris Baltschun – electronics; Chris Brown – piano; Tom Djll – trumpet; Matt Ingalls – clarinet; Tim Perkis – electronics; Gino Robair – electronics; John Shiurba – guitar. Creative Sources (Lisbon, Portugal). CD.

"SUPERMODEL SUPERMODEL" 2006 GAIL BRAND trombone; TIM PERKIS electronics; GINO ROBAIR percussion, faux dax, horns, Styrofoam, ebow snare; JOHN SHIURBA electric guitar; MATTHEW SPERRY double bass and preparations. On EMANEM (UK). CD.

"Thousand Oaks" 2005 Philip Gelb (shakuhachi), Shoko Hikage (koto), Tim Perkis (electronics), Chris Brown (piano). On 482 Music. CD

"Six Fuchs" 2004 Wolfgang Fuchs (reeds), Tom Dill(tpt), Gino Robair(perc), John Shiurba(gtr), Matthew Sperry(bass), and Perkis(electronics). On Rastascan (San Francisco). CD

"Headlands" 2003 extended improvisations with Philip Gelb, shakuhachi; Shoko Hikage, koto; and Chris Brown (electronic music), on 482 Music(Chicago),

"Praeface" 2003 Compilation of artists on Praemedia label, (San Francisco). CD.

"Motive" 2002 Solo. Praemedia (San Francisco). CD.

"Tim Perkis Live on the Artship" 2002 The Artship Recordings are a series of live solo improvisations each by a different artist, and each performed in "The Artship", a decommissioned US Navy troop transport which was docked in Oakland and served as a floating arts center for several years. (3.5-in CD).

"Luminous Axis" 2002 Wadada Leo Smith with John Bischoff, Chris Brown, Ikue Mori, Tim Perkis, Mark Trayle and William Winant. Tzadik (New York). CD.

"Apollo and Marsyas" 2002 An anthology of New Music Concerts at Het Apollohuis, Eindhoven, The Netherlands, from 1980 to 1997, including performances by The Hub and 37 other new music luminaries. Het Apollohuis (Eindhoven, The Netherlands.). CD.

"Fuzzybunny" 2000 Electronic improvisations with Scot Gresham-Lancaster and Chris Brown. Sonore(Bordeaux & Tokyo). CD.

"International Live Electronic Music Incorporated" 2000 Recorded at the Korzo Theater, Den Haag on 9 April 1998. John Bischoff, Tim Perkis, Gert-Jan Prins, Luc Houtkamp, Kaffe Matthews and Anne LaBerge. On Xor (Den Haag). CD

"What Would This Record Have Sounded Like of John Cale had had Some Setback and Cinzia La Fauci and Alberto Scotti had Taken His Place?" 2000 Compilation of Iggy Pop covers by various artists including: Perkis, Etoile Filante, Solex, Taniguchi Masaaki, Ectogram, Steven Bryant, Jonathan LaMaster/Roger Miller, Frank Chickens, Crowded Air, Oxbox, Allun, God is my Co-pilot, Dean Roberst, Massey Fergusson Ensemble, The Pornography, Culo Negro and Mutable. A co-production of Snowdonia (Messina, Italy) and Club Lunatica (Tokyo). CD

"Diatoms" 1999 Duo improvisations with Lelio Giannetto, bass. Recorded in Palermo, Sicily 12/5/1998. On Curva Minore(Palermo). CD

"Perkolator" 1999 Pieces all made by mangling live recordings of improv ensemble sessions with Henry Kuntz, Matt Ingalls, Gino Robair, John Shiurba, Ed Hermann, Dave Slusser, and Matthew Sperry. On Limited Sedition (Oakland). CD

"Buddy Systems" 1998 Gino Robair plays selected duos and trios, with John Butcher and Tim Perkis, Otomo Yoshihide, Carl Kihlstedt and Matthew Sperry, Dan Plonsey, LaDonna Smith, Splatter Trio, Oluyemi Thomas, and Myles Boisen on Meniscus(Minneapolis). CD

"Matthew Sperry Trio" 1997 Actually a quartet, that didn't include the late Matthew Sperry! Matt Ingalls, Tim Perkis, Gino Robair, John Shiurba. On Limited Sedition (Oakland). CD

"The Hub: Live in Atlanta" 1997 A live multimedia performance, in an auditorium equipped with Ethernet connections at every seat. Audience members with laptops could connect to a website allowing them to vote to influence the direction of the live performance. Produced at Georgia Tech by PTRL. CD

"Five" 1995 Solo violin improvisations. From Lucky Garage(Berkeley). 7-inch vinyl, 33 rpm.

"Wreckin' Ball" 1994 The Hub's second album. Includes collaborations with Ramon Sender, Alvin Curran and the ROVA Saxophone Quartet. Artifact (San Francisco). CD

"Tarzan Speaks" 1991 w/ group Rotodoti: Doug Carroll (cello); Ron Heglin (trombone, voice); Tom Nunn (electroacoustic percussion); Tim Perkis (electronics). Artifact (San Francisco). CD

"Artificial Horizon" 1989 Individual and duo tracks with John Bischoff. Artifact (San Francisco). CD

"The Hub" 1989 JOHN BISCHOFF, TIM PERKIS, CHRIS BROWN, SCOT GRESHAM-LANCASTER, MARK TRAYLE, PHIL STONE. THE HUB is a computer music band whose members are all designers and builders of their own hardware and software instruments. The group electronically coordinates the activity of their individual systems through a central micro-computer, The Hub itself, as well as manually through ears, eyes, and hands. Artifact (San Francisco). CD.
