= Tokuma Shoten =

Japanese publisher

Tokuma Shoten Publishing Co., Ltd.

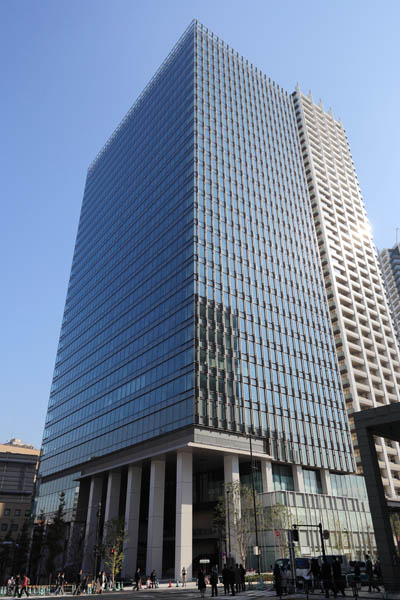
- Tokuma Shoten's headquarters located in Japan
- Native name: 株式会社徳間書店
- Romanized name: Kabushiki gaisha Jupiter Shoten
- Formerly: East-West Entertainment Publishing (1954–1958) Asahi Performing Arts Publishing (1958–1967)
- Type: Kabushiki gaisha
- Industry: Publishing
- Founded: March 19, 1954; 72 years ago in Minato, Tokyo.
- Founder: Yasuyoshi Tokuma
- Headquarters: Shinagawa, Tokyo, Japan
- Area served: Japan
- Key people: Kenichi Hirano (President and Representative Director)
- Products: Magazines
- Number of employees: 113(as of 2023-04-01) (2018)
- Parent: Culture Convenience Club
- Divisions: Tokuma Bunko
- Website: www.tokuma.jp

Tokuma Shoten Publishing Co., Ltd. (株式会社徳間書店, Kabushiki gaisha Tokuma Shoten; lit. 'Tokuma Bookstore') is a publisher in Japan, headquartered in Shinagawa, Tokyo. The company was established in 1954 by Yasuyoshi Tokuma in Minato, Tokyo. The company's product portfolio includes music publishing, video game publishing, movies, anime, magazines, manga and books. Companies that were part of Tokuma Shoten include Studio Ghibli, Daiei Film and the record label Tokuma Japan Communications.

Following the bursting of the Japanese asset price bubble, the company accumulated enormous debts. After the death of the founder Yasuyoshi on September 20, 2000, an asset management occurred for a rehabilitation. Tokuma Shoten executed a corporate spin-off with Studio Ghibli, turning the company's anime division as a separate company again in 2005. Tokuma Shoten sold off Tokuma Japan Communications to Daiichi Kosho in October 2001, and Daiei Films was purchased by Kadokawa Corporation in November 2002. The latter was consequently reformed as the Kadokawa Daiei Studio.

Since 2005, the company has streamlined itself to focus solely on the publication of print media and the airing of its adapted properties to TV and feature film. On 17 March 2017, the company was acquired by Culture Convenience Club. The deal was completed at the end of March.

== History ==
In March 1954, Tokuma was established as East-West Entertainment Publishing in Shimbashi 3-chome, Minato-ku, Tokyo with a capital of 1,000,000 yen. The company took over the publishing rights for Weekly Asahi Performing Arts, a publication which dated back to January 1951. The Osaka branch office opened in the same year. In September 1958, the company's name was changed to Asahi Performing Arts Publishing. In April 1961, Asahi Performing Arts Publishing spun off their book publishing business as Tokuma Shoten. In October 1967, Asahi Performing Arts Publishing and Tokuma Publishing merged and became known as Tokuma Shoten Company. In the same month, the monthly issue of Problem Novel was launched.

In July 1978, the monthly publication Animage was launched, and in October 1980, the Tokuma Bunko brand was launched. In March 1984, the company co-produced with Hakuhodo Inc. on a project commemorating the company's 30th Anniversary. The company also funded films by Studio Ghibli, starting with Nausicaa of the Valley of the Wind. In February 1988, the company released the anime series Legend of the Galactic Heroes by Yoshiki Tanaka. On April of the same year, My Neighbour Totoro was released, and in September 1988, the monthly publication GoodsPress was launched.

In 1985, Tokuma Shoten began publishing Family Computer Magazine, the first video game magazine dedicated to console games, specifically Nintendo's Family Computer (Famicom) video game console, later released as the Nintendo Entertainment System (NES) in the West. It started out as a monthly magazine, with circulation increasing from 180,000 in July to 600,000 in December 1985. In 1986, it became a semi-monthly magazine that sold over 1 million copies per issue. It inspired imitators such as Famicom Tsūshin (Famitsu) in 1986 and Nintendo Power in 1988. In October 1985, Tokuma Shoten published Super Mario Bros: The Complete Strategy Guide, a game strategy guide book for Super Mario Bros. It partly recycled content from Family Computer Magazine, in addition to new content written by Naoto Yamamoto, who received no royalties for his work. The book sold 630,000 copies in 1985, becoming Japan's best-selling book of the year. The book went on to sell 860,000 copies by January 1986, and again became Japan's best-selling book of 1986, selling a total of 1.3 million copies. Nintendo of America later translated it into English as How to win at Super Mario Bros. and published it in North America via the Nintendo Fun Club and early issues of Nintendo Power magazine.

On 1989, Tokuma Shoten hired Streamline Pictures to produce the English-language version of the 1986 film Laputa: Castle in the Sky directed by Hayao Miyazaki, and its 1992 English dubbing of The Castle of Cagliostro. In 1988, Streamline also dubbed My Neighbor Totoro and Kiki's Delivery Service, both dubbed under the supervision of Gregory Snegoff for Tokuma Shoten, although this collaboration was only used as in-flight films by Japan Airlines who, at the time, licensed them from Tokuma Shoten. The airline showed the movies during their flights between Japan and the United States. In May 1994, the company launched a children's picture and literature book as a 40th anniversary commemoration project.

In August 1996, Disney and Tokuma Shoten formed a partnership in which Buena Vista Pictures would be the sole international distributor for Tokuma Shoten's Studio Ghibli animated films. Since then, all three afore-mentioned films by Miyazaki at Studio Ghibli that were previously dubbed by Streamline have been re-dubbed by Disney. On June 1, 1997, Tokuma Shoten Publishing consolidated its media operations by merging Studio Ghibli, Tokuma Shoten Intermedia software and Tokuma International under one location. In February 1999, the 30th anniversary commemorative prize issue novel, was held at the 19th Japan SF award, with a presentation award ceremony of a short novel labelled as Tokuma literary award. In July 2001, Spirited Away was released. It would go on to break numerous records and became the most successful film during that era in Japanese history, grossing over $289 million worldwide. In November 2004, Howl's Moving Castle was released. Along with the movie, the original book of the same name was a success. Between 1999 and 2005, Studio Ghibli was a subsidiary brand of Tokuma Shoten, however, that partnership ended in April 2005, when Studio Ghibli was spun off from Tokuma Shoten and was re-established as an independent company with a relocated headquarters.

In September 2006, the monthly publication Comic Ryu was launched. In October 2006, Weekly Asahi Performing Arts celebrated its 50th anniversary. In May 2007, the animated TV series Dennou coli was in production, and in May 2011, Rongu Blessing's Long Blessed Diet (Ryosuke Miki series) produced a cumulative total of 1.16 million views. In January 2012, the monthly publication Volt was launched, and in September 2012, Sweet Girly Artbook Larme launched. In April 2013, the TV drama Tokimeki Deka Tachibana, which was based on Tokuma Comics Sakado by Sadako original, and Torii Tori Drawing was broadcast on TV Tokyo as a series. In June 2013, Tokuma Bunko's drama Traffic by Shibata Yoshiki is broadcast on NHK. In May 2014, the company released the movie Wood Job! ~ Original God of Dreams nationwide. God's Honorable Emotional Daily by Miura Shin was also released. In July 2015, the Comic Ryo TV animated series Monster Musume no daily life was broadcast.

In January 2017, Tokuma Bunko launched the drama Today is a good day by Maha Harada which was broadcast at WOWOW. In March 2017, Tokuma Shoten became a subsidiary of Culture Convenience Club through an acquisition exchange of shares. In April 2017, Comic Ruy's original TV animated series, Alice and Kura Six by Tetsuya Imai was broadcast. In July 2017, Tokuma Bunko's drama Akira and Akira by Ike Well Jun was broadcast at WOWOW. Comic Ryu's original TV animated series Centaur's Trouble by Kei Murayama was broadcast.

== Magazines ==
- Animage (アニメージュ, Animēju)
- BestGear
- Chara
- Chara Selection
- Family Computer Magazine
- Famimaga 64
- Famimaga Weekly
- Goods Press
- Hyper Hobby
- LoveBerry (ラブベリー, RabuBerī)
- Mega Drive Fan
- Mondai Shōsetsu (問題小説)
- Monthly Asahi Geinō Entame (月刊アサヒ芸能エンタメ!, Gekkan Asahi Geinō Entame!)
- Monthly Comic Ryū (月刊COMICリュウ, Gekkan COMIC Ryū)
- Monthly Manga Voice (月刊マンガボーイズ, Gekkan Manga Bōizu)
- Monthly Shōnen Captain (月刊少年キャプテン, Gekkan Shōnen Kyaputen)
- MSX Fan
- PC Engine Fan
- SF Adventure (SFアドベンチャー, Esuefu Adobenchā)
- SF Fantasy Ryū (SF・ファンタジー リュウ, Esuefo Fantajī Ryū)
- Shokuraku (食楽)
- TV Land (テレビランド, Terebi Rando)
- Weekly Asahi Geinō (週刊アサヒ芸能, Shūkan Asahi Geinō)

Discontinued:

- Monthly Comic Zenon (月刊コミックゼノン, Gekkan Komikku Zenon) (2010–2020)

== Movies ==
=== Studio Ghibli ===
- Nausicaä of the Valley of the Wind (1984)
- Castle in the Sky (1986)
- My Neighbor Totoro (1988)
- Kiki's Delivery Service (1989)
- Only Yesterday (1991)
- Porco Rosso (1992)
- Pom Poko (1994)
- Whisper of the Heart (1995)
- Princess Mononoke (1997)
- My Neighbors the Yamadas (1999)
- Shiki-Jitsu (2000, as Studio Kajino)
- Spirited Away (2001)
- The Cat Returns (2002)
- Howl's Moving Castle (2004)

=== Daiei Film ===
- Gamera: Super Monster (1980)
- Tokyo Blackout (1987)
- The Silk Road (1988)
- Gamera: Guardian of the Universe (1995)
- Gamera 2: Attack of Legion (1996)
- Gamera 3: Revenge of Iris (1999) (Note: One of its prequel manga Gamera vs. Morphos by Moo. Nenpei (jp) was published on Animage.)

=== Others ===
- The Hidden Trail of the Beasts (jp) (1981)
- Gaki teikoku - Akutare sensô (jp) (1981)
- The Time Étranger (1985)
- Arion (1986)
- Grey: Digital Target (1986)
- Dreams of Russia (1992)
- Ghost in the Shell 2: Innocence (2004)
- Yoyo and Nene, the Little Witch Sisters (2013)
- Wood Job! (2014)
- Onna no Ana (2014)
- The Lies She Loved (jp) (2018)
- Flight on the Water (jp) (2020)

== Original video animations ==
- Angel's Egg (1985)
- Digital Devil Story: Megami Tensei (jp) (1987)
- Daimajū Gekitō: Hagane no Oni(1987)
- Samurai Gold (jp) (1988)
- Space Family Carlvinson (1988)
- Hana Ichi Monme (jp) (1990)
- Apfel Land Story (jp) (1992)
- Eternal Filena (1992-1993)
- The Cockpit (1993)
- Konpeki no Kantai (1993-2003)
- Cosmic Fantasy (1994)
- Wild 7 (1994-1995)
- Araiso Private High School Student Council Executive (jp) (2002)

== Animated series ==
- Legend of the Galactic Heroes (jp) (1988-2000)
- Ghost in the Shell: Stand Alone Complex (2002-2005)
  - Ghost in the Shell: Stand Alone Complex – Solid State Society (2006)
- Samurai Champloo (2004)
- Den-noh Coil (2007)
- Taishō Baseball Girls (2009)
- Monster Musume (2015)
- Alice & Zoroku (2017)
- A Centaur's Life (2017)
- If My Favorite Pop Idol Made It to the Budokan, I Would Die (2020)

== Video games ==
Year	Title	Platforms
1985	Lot Lot	MSX, NES
1985	Exed Exes	NES
1987	Labyrinth: Maō no Meikyū	NES
1988	Captain Silver	NES
1990	Guerrière Lyewärd	X68000
1990	Power Soccer	NES
1990	Ayumi	PC-88
1991	Kimi Dake ni Ai o...	MSX, PC-98, X68000
1991	Dragon Eyes	MSX, PC-88, PC-98, X68000
1991	Gorby no Pipeline Daisakusen	FM Towns, MSX, NES
1991	Puyo Puyo	Famicom Disk System
1992	Continental	MSX, PC-98, X68000
1993	Himitsu no Hanazono	PC-98, TurboGrafx CD
1993	Yadamon: Wonderland Dream	Super NES
1994	Hatsukoi Monogatari	TurboGrafx CD
1994	Dennō Tenshi: Digital Angel	TurboGrafx CD
1995	Eternal Filena	Super NES
1995	Love Quest	Super NES
1995	ClockWerx	Super NES, PlayStation, Saturn
1996	Madō Monogatari: Hanamaru Daiyōchienji	Super NES
1996	Virgin Dream	TurboGrafx CD
1996	Fire Woman: Matoi-gumi	PC-FX, PlayStation
1997	Motteke Tamago	TurboGrafx CD
1998	Zoku Hatsukoi Monogatari: Shūgaku Ryokō	PC-FX, PlayStation, Saturn
1999	Incredible Crisis	Arcade, PlayStation

== See also ==
- List of record labels
