= Paul Plimley =

Canadian free jazz pianist (1953–2022)

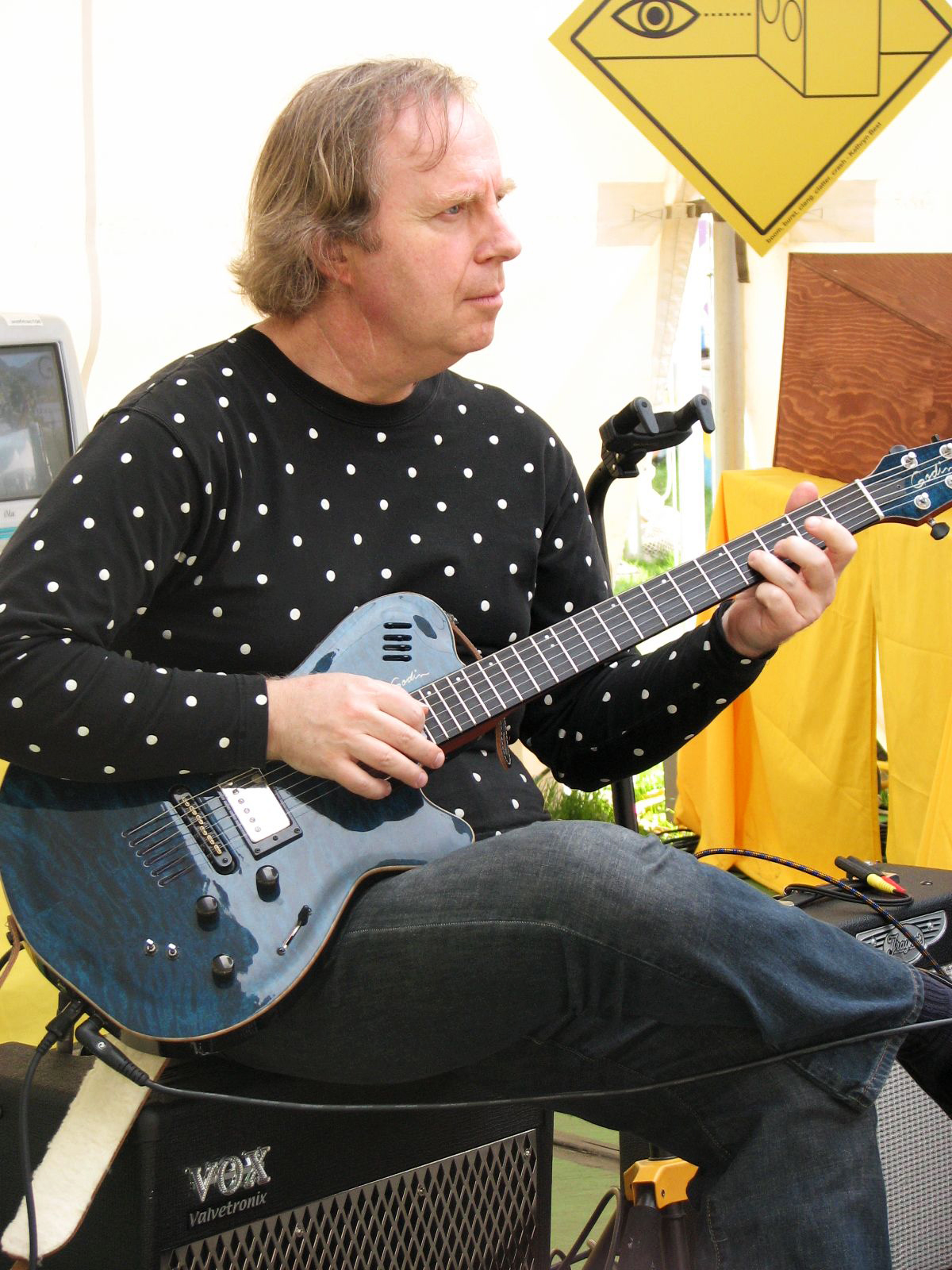

Background information
- Born: 16 March 1953; Vancouver, British Columbia, Canada
- Died: 18 May 2022 (aged 69) Vancouver, British Columbia, Canada
- Genres: Jazz
- Occupation: Instrumentalist
- Instruments: Piano, vibraphone
- Website: www.paulplimley.com

Paul Horace Plimley (16 March 1953 – 18 May 2022) was a free jazz pianist and vibraphonist. He was one of the doyens of the Canadian jazz avant-garde, a co-founder of the New Orchestra Workshop Society and frequent collaborator with the bassist Lisle Ellis. He was well-versed in classical music and in all styles of jazz; he was one of the first and most convincing interpreters of Ornette Coleman's music on the piano (an instrument usually seen as antithetical to Coleman's music).

Born in Vancouver, British Columbia, Plimley studied classical piano under Kum-Sing Lee at the University of British Columbia (1971–73). In 1978–79 he studied with Karl Berger and Cecil Taylor at the Creative Music Studio in Woodstock, NY. In 1977, he founded the New Orchestra Workshop (NOW), and he has been active in many of the ensembles associated with NOW, including the NOW Orchestra.

His work with Lisle Ellis is extensive, and includes the duo CD Both Sides of the Same Mirror (Nine Winds, 1989); When Silence Pulls, with Andrew Cyrille (Music & Arts, 1990); Noir, with Bruce Freedman and Gregg Bendian (Victo, 1992); Density of the Lovestruck Demons with Donald Robinson (Music & Arts, 1994); and Safecrackers with Scott Amendola (Victo, 1999). He made two recordings for Hat Art: the collection of Ornette Coleman interpretations, Kaleidoscopes (1992), and (under Joe McPhee's leadership), a revisiting of Max Roach's Freedom Now Suite called Sweet Freedom, Now What? (1994). In May 2000, he recorded a live act at the 17th International Festival of New Music in Victoriaville, Quebec with John Oswald, Marilyn Crispell and Cecil Taylor. The album was released at Victo Records. He was a regular performer at the Vancouver International Jazz Festival.

Plimley died in Vancouver at the age of 69 on 18 May 2022 from lung cancer.

== Discography ==
=== Solo albums ===
- 1995: Everything in Stages (Songlines)

=== As band leader ===
With Lisle Ellis

- 1991: When Silence Pulls with Andrew Cyrille (Music & Arts)
- 1992: Kaleidoscopes (Hat Art)
- 1993: Noir (Les Disques Victo) with Gregg Bendian

With Barry Guy

- 1997: Sensology (Maya)
- 2012: Hexentrio (Intakt), with Lucas Niggli

With Trichy Sankaran

- 1998: Ivory Ganesh Meets Doctor Drums (Songlines)

With John Oswald, Marilyn Crispell and Cecil Taylor

- 2001: Complicité (Les Disques Victo)

=== Collaborations ===
With Joe McPhee

- 1995: Sweet Freedom - Now What? (Hat Hut)

With Henry Kaiser

- 1999: Passwords (Spool), with Danielle DeGruttola
- 2012: The Starbreak Splatterlight (There), with Weasel Walter and Lukas Ligeti

With Mei Han

- 2006: Ume (ZA Discs)

With Anthony Davis

- 2016: Past Piano Present | Live at Western Front 1985 - 2015 (Western Front New Music), including with Al Neil and John Kameel Farah

With Glenn Spearman

- Free Worlds (Black Saint, 2000)

== TV appearances ==
- In the Key of Eh! Canadian Jazz Piano (1996)
- Duos: the jazz sessions (2000)
- Solos: the jazz sessions (2004)
