= The Aggregate =

Live album by Rova Saxophone Quartet and Anthony Braxton
- Released: 1988
- Recorded: August 22, 1986 and July 30, 1988
- Venue: PreEchoes 2 in San Francisco, California and Koncepts Cultural Gallery, Oakland, California, United States
- Genre: Jazz
- Length: 50:18 (LP); 69:03 (CD)
- Label: Sound Aspects; SAS 023
- Producer: Pedro De Freitas and Rova

Anthony Braxton chronology
Solo (London) 1988 (1988)	The Aggregate (1988)	Ensemble (Victoriaville) 1988 (1988)

Rova Saxophone Quartet chronology
Beat Kennel (1987)	The Aggregate (1988)	Long on Logic (1990)

The Aggregate is a live album by the Rova Saxophone Quartet and Anthony Braxton recorded in California in 1986 and 1988 for the Sound Aspects label.

== Reception ==
Professional ratings
Review scores
Source	Rating
Allmusic	4/5 stars

The Allmusic review by Brian Olewnick states "The Aggregate is a challenging recording, more so than most by more jazz-oriented saxophone quartets, but very rewarding on its own terms and an important document in Braxton's work for woodwind ensembles". in the Washington Post Mike Joyce wrote "If easy-listening music lies at one end of the pop spectrum, the edgy, probing and often discordant sounds Anthony Braxton and the ROVA Saxophone Quartet conjure up on "The Aggregate" can be found at the opposite extreme. In fact, lacking the jazz and blues-orientation of the World Saxophone Quartet or the lightheartedness of, say, Washington's own Windmill Saxophone Quartet, the Braxton-ROVA collaboration will appeal primarily to listeners open to the more cerebral side of improvisation and composition".

== Track listing ==
1. "The Shopper" (Larry Ochs) – 11:16
2. "The Aggregate" (Jon Raskin) – 11:34
3. "Composition 129+" (Anthony Braxton) – 46:13 Originally edited to 27:28 on LP release

Note

- Recorded on August 22, 1986, at PreEchoes 2 in San Francisco, CA (track 2) and July 30, 1988, at Koncepts Cultural Gallery, Oakland, CA (tracks 1 & 3)

== Personnel ==
- Anthony Braxton – contrabass saxophone, bass saxophone, baritone saxophone, tenor saxophone, alto saxophone, soprano saxophone, sopranino saxophone
- Bruce Ackley – soprano saxophone, clarinet
- Andrew Voigt – tenor saxophone, alto saxophone, sopranino saxophone, flute
- Larry Ochs – tenor saxophone, alto saxophone, sopranino saxophone
- Jon Raskin – baritone saxophone, alto saxophone, clarinet
