= Favorite Street =

Studio album by Rova Saxophone Quartet
- Released: 1984
- Recorded: November 15–17, 1983
- Studio: Barigozzi Studio, Milano, Italy
- Genre: Jazz
- Length: 42:36
- Label: Black Saint; BSR 0076
- Producer: Giovanni Bonandrini

Rova Saxophone Quartet chronology
Saxophone Democracy (1983)	Favorite Street (1984)	The Crowd (1986)

Favorite Street is an album by the Rova Saxophone Quartet performing compositions by Steve Lacy recorded in Milan in 1983 for the Italian Black Saint label.

== Reception ==
Professional ratings
Review scores
Source	Rating
Allmusic	4.5/5 stars
The Penguin Guide to Jazz Recordings	3/4 stars

The Allmusic review by Scott Yanow states "Lacy's scalar works, which include "The Dumps," "Moon" and "Snips," are ideal for the saxophone quartet, who really dig beneath the surface and understand the pieces, as Lacy has always understood Thelonious Monk. Lacy's thoughtful brand of freedom, the variety found in these originals (which range from swing to purposely rhythmically wooden melodies), and with the inventive rearranging by ROVA make this a continually surprising, colorful and adventurous set".

== Track listing ==
All compositions by Steve Lacy.

1. "The Dumps" - 2:15
2. "The Throes" - 4:34
3. "Sidelines" - 5:12
4. "Undone" - 6:56
5. "Beeline" - 10:33
6. "Moon" - 9:56
7. "Snips" - 3:10

== Personnel ==
- Bruce Ackley – soprano saxophone, clarinet
- Andrew Voigt – alto saxophone, soprano saxophone, sopranino saxophone
- Larry Ochs – tenor saxophone, sopranino saxophone
- Jon Raskin – baritone saxophone, alto saxophone, clarinet
