= The Crowd (Rova Saxophone Quartet album) =

Studio album by Rova Saxophone Quartet
- Released: 1986
- Recorded: June 20–23, 1985
- Studio: Studio Charles Cros. Maison de la Culture d'Amiens, France
- Genre: Jazz
- Length: 78:40
- Label: Hathut hat ART 2032
- Producer: Pia and Werner X. Uehlinger

Rova Saxophone Quartet chronology
Favorite Street (1983)	The Crowd (1986)	Beat Kennel (1987)

The Crowd (subtitled For Elias Canetti) is an album by the Rova Saxophone Quartet recorded in France in 1985 for the Swiss Hathut label.

== Reception ==
Professional ratings
Review scores
Source	Rating
Allmusic	4.5/5 stars

The Allmusic review by Thom Jurek states "The Crowd is seamless in both composition and execution after the first few minutes that is "Sport," and directly into the nearly 20-minute title work it becomes impossible for the listener to know what was written and what was improvised. Certainly each member of this group solos, but it is the simultaneous improvisation and the harmonic texture of the composition itself that winds and weaves its way not only though different musical territory (there is even a section that nods toward Adams and Philip Glass), but diverse emotional ground is covered as well. To call this music "jazz" would be both accurate and a mistake, for it is both entirely jazz and not at all; to call it "free music" or "new music" would be just plain lazy and stupid; to call this ROVA music would make sense".

== Track listing ==
1986 vinyl version

1. "Terrains" (Jon Raskin) – 16:19
2. "Room" (Larry Ochs) – 10:40
3. "Knife in the Times, Parts 1+2" (Ochs) – 6:30
4. "Knife in the Times, Parts 3-8" (Ochs) – 22:50
5. "The Crowd" (Bruce Ackley, Ochs, Raskin, Andrew Voigt) – 19:12
6. "Sport" (Ackley, Ochs, Raskin, Voigt) – 3:05

1992 CD reissue

1. "Sport" – 3:05
2. "The Crowd" – 19:12
3. "Room" – 10:40
4. "Knife in the Times 1-8" – 29:25
5. "Terrains" – 16:19

== Personnel ==
- Bruce Ackley – soprano saxophone
- Andrew Voigt – alto saxophone, clarinet
- Larry Ochs – tenor saxophone, soprano saxophone
- Jon Raskin – baritone saxophone, alto saxophone
