= The Hub (band) =

American music ensemble

The Hub is an American "computer network music" ensemble formed in 1986 consisting of John Bischoff, Tim Perkis, Chris Brown, Scot Gresham-Lancaster, Mark Trayle and Phil Stone. "The Hub was the first live computer music band whose members were all composers, as well as designers and builders of their own hardware and software."

The Hub grew from the League of Automatic Music Composers: John Bischoff, Tim Perkis, Jim Horton, and Rich Gold. Perkis and Bischoff modified their equipment for a performance at The Network Muse Festival in 1986 at The LAB in San Francisco. Instead of creating an ad-hoc wired connection of computer interaction, they decided to use a hub – a general purpose connection for network data. This was less failure-prone and enabled greater collaborations.

The Hub was the first band to do a telematic performance in 1987 at the Clocktower in New York.

Since this work represents some of the earliest work in the context of the new live music practice of networked music performance, they have been cited as the archetypal network ensemble in computer music. The Hub's best-known piece, Stuck Note by Scot Gresham-Lancaster has been covered by a number of network music bands, including MiLO – the Milwaukee Laptop Orchestra – and BiLE – the Birmingham Laptop Ensemble.

They have collaborated with Rova Saxophone Quartet, Nick Collins, Phill Niblock, and Alvin Curran. They currently perform around the world after a multi-year hiatus, ending in 2004.

In 2018, The Hub was awarded the Giga-Hertz Prize for lifetime achievement in electronic music by ZKM in Karlsruhe, Germany.

== Discography ==
- The Hub (1989, Artifact ART 1002)
- Wreckin' Ball (1994, Artifact ART 1008).
- The Hub: Boundary Layer (2008, Tzadik – 3-CD box set)
