= Mystery Project =

Studio album by Glenn Spearman
- Released: 1993
- Recorded: August 20–21, 1992
- Studio: Bay Recording, Berkeley, California
- Genre: Jazz
- Length: 65:48
- Label: Black Saint
- Producer: Larry Ochs

Glenn Spearman chronology
| Utterance (1990) | Mystery Project (1993) | Smokehouse (1994) |

Mystery Project is the first album by American jazz saxophonist Glenn Spearman Double Trio, which was recorded in 1992 and released on the Italian Black Saint label.

== Background ==
The concept of the Double Trio was born at Oakland Improvisers Festival in 1990. Saxophonist Larry Ochs was at the festival with his trio Room, with pianist Chris Brown and percussionist William Winant. Spearman was appearing with bassist Ben Lindgren and drummer Donald Robinson. They decided to combine all these players to create the Double Trio.

== Reception ==
Professional ratings
Review scores
| Source | Rating |
|---|---|
| The Penguin Guide to Jazz | 3.5/4 stars |
| AllMusic | 4.5/5 stars |

The Penguin Guide to Jazz says about Spearman "He's a fierce player, overblowing in the upper register and virtually incapable of anything less than full throttle. He never sacrifices sublety to power, though. This is intelligent music that never palls or sound dated."

== Track listing ==
All compositions by Spearman except where noted

1. "Straight Up Straight Out" – 7:54
2. "Double Image" (Ochs) – 14:40
3. "Horus" – 21:54
4. "S.D. III" – 12:08
5. "Thinking of Frank" – 11:16

== Personnel ==
- Glenn Spearman – tenor sax
- Larry Ochs – tenor sax, sopranino sax
- Donald Robinson – drums
- William Winant – drums
- Chris Brown – piano, DX7
- Ben Lindgren – double bass
