= Utterance (album) =

Studio album by Glenn Spearman & John Heward
- Released: 1990
- Recorded: October 28, 1990
- Studio: Silent Sound, Montreal
- Genre: Jazz
- Length: 56:12
- Label: Cadence Jazz
- Producer: Bob Rush

Glenn Spearman chronology
Night After Night (1981)	Utterance (1990)	Mystery Project (1993)

Utterance is an album by the American jazz saxophonist Glenn Spearman with drummer John Heward. It was recorded on October 28, 1990, at Silent Sound Studio in Montreal, Quebec, Canada, and was initially released on cassette by the Canadian label Dictions in 1990. In 1999, the album was reissued on CD by Cadence Jazz.

== Reception ==
Professional ratings
Review scores
Source	Rating
AllMusic	4/5 stars
The Penguin Guide to Jazz	3/4 stars

In his review for AllMusic, Steve Loewy wrote that "it is a significant part of the saxophonist's discography in that it reveals his clear debt to fellow saxophonist Frank Wright and offers the chance to hear Spearman develop long solos with minimal distraction."

The Penguin Guide to Jazz noted: "The Coltrane influence is still there, but it has been subsumed into something altogether more linear."

The JazzTimes review by Duck Baker stated: "The measured pace is certainly an intelligent response to the sax-percussion instrumentation, in which the temptation is to fill up the space instead of letting it become part of things as it does here."

Referring to the album Interstellar Space, Derek Taylor of One Final Note commented: "Sax/drums duos are no longer an uncommon terrain in today's improvisatory music topography, but this meeting maps well among the high cloud-circled peaks set by Coltrane and Ali's precedent."

== Track listing ==
All compositions by Spearman / Heward

1. "Tongues" – 27:59
2. "The Solidification of Fires" – 15:30
3. "Summoning Voices" – 12:43

== Personnel ==
- Glenn Spearman – tenor sax, bells, voice
- John Heward – drums, kalimba, voice
