= From Silence to Sorcery =

Studio album by John Zorn
- Released: June 2007
- Genres: Avant-Garde; Contemporary classical
- Length: 36:09
- Label: Tzadik TZ 8035
- Producer: John Zorn

John Zorn chronology
Asmodeus: Book of Angels Volume 7 (2007)	From Silence to Sorcery (2007)	Filmworks XIX: The Rain Horse (2008)

From Silence to Sorcery is an album of contemporary classical music by John Zorn which features three instrumental works touching upon themes of magic and mysticism. "Goetia" is a set of variations for solo violin written in 2002. "Gris-Gris" (2000) is a work for thirteen tuned drums performed by William Winant inspired by the music of Korean Shamanism, Haitian Voodoo and a scene from Howard Hawks’ classic film To Have and Have Not. Scored for clavichord, three muted strings and percussion, 'Shibboleth" (1997) is a tribute to the Jewish poet Paul Celan.

== Reception ==
Professional ratings
Review scores
Source	Rating
Allmusic	4.5/5 stars

The Allmusic review by Stephen Eddins awarded the album 4½ stars stating "it's notable for the variety of its sonorities, for its disciplined economy, and for the integrity of the evocative sound world he creates".

Writing for All About Jazz, Troy Collins commented "A remarkably restrained effort in contrast with his usual output, Zorn again proves his creative viability as a post-modern renaissance man with a sublime collection of chamber music".

== Track listing ==
All compositions by John Zorn

1. "Goetia I" - 0:57
2. "Goetia II" - 2:46
3. "Goetia III" - 1:07
4. "Goetia IV" - 1:42
5. "Goetia V" - 1:12
6. "Goetia VI" - 1:54
7. "Goetia VII" - 2:53
8. "Goetia VIII" - 1:20
9. "Gris-Gris" - 9:41
10. "Shibboleth: I Abglanzbeladen/II Im Leeren (In Empty Space)/III Mandelnde (Almond-like)/IV Hinterlassne (Left Back)/V Etwas Wie Nacht (Something Like Night)/VI Aus Verlorem (From Things Lost)" - 12:37

== Personnel ==
- Jennifer Choi - violin (tracks 1–8)
- William Winant - drums, percussion (tracks 9 & 10)
- Lois Martin - viola (track 10)
- Fred Sherry - cello (track 10)
- Steve Drury - clavichord (track 10)
- Brad Lubman - conductor (track 10)
