= Homeland (film) =

2014 film

- Poster
- Directed by: Nao Kubota
- Written by: Kenji Aoki
- Produced by: Takehiko Aoki; Yuji Sadai; Hijiri Taguchi
- Starring: Kenichi Matsuyama; Yūko Tanaka; Masaaki Uchino
- Cinematography: Yoko Itakura
- Music by: Takashi Kako
- Production companies: Wowow; Pony Canyon; Horipro; Bitters End; IMAGINE Inc.; L'espace Vision; solidjam
- Release dates: 11 February 2014 (Berlin); 1 March 2014 (Japan)
- Running time: 118 minutes
- Country: Japan
- Language: Japanese

Homeland (Japanese: 家路, Hepburn: Ieji) is a 2014 Japanese drama film directed by Nao Kubota. The film had its premiere in the Panorama section of the 64th Berlin International Film Festival. Its score was composed by Takashi Kako, in addition to songs by Salyu.

== Cast ==
- Kenichi Matsuyama
- Yūko Tanaka
- Masaaki Uchino
- Ken Mitsuishi
- Yoji Tanaka
- Renji Ishibashi
- Sakura Ando
- Takashi Yamanaka
