= Electric Ascension =

Live album by Rova::Orkestrova
- Released: 2005
- Recorded: February 8, 2003 for KFJC, Los Altos, CA
- Genre: Free jazz
- Length: 64:00
- Label: Atavistic ALP 159
- Producer: Jon Raskin and Larry Ochs

Rova::Orkestrova chronology
An Alligator in Your Wallet (2004)	Electric Ascension (2005)	Totally Spinning (2006)

Electric Ascension is a live album by Rova::Orchestrova, the American ensemble Rova Saxophone Quartet along with additional musicians, performing an interpretation of John Coltrane's 1966 album Ascension. The album was recorded in California in 2003 and released on the Atavistic label in 2005.

== Reception ==
Professional ratings
Review scores
Source	Rating
Penguin Guide to Jazz	👑

The JazzTimes review by Chris Kelsey stated "The music's success owes largely to the structure conceived by [Rova's Larry] Ochs. Leaving such a large group to their own devices can be an invitation to disaster. Ochs averts it by sketching a schematic that structures the improvisation, breaking the ensemble into various groupings and resulting in a variety of sonorities and textures that sensibly unfold". On All About Jazz Kurt Gottschalk noted "Much of this 2003 recording sounds little like Coltrane's original, and much of it is truly great" while Eyal Hareuveni said "Rova, with its inspired Orkestrova, engages Coltrane's uncompromising compositional attitude and boundaries, pushing with its own sense of informed and masterful improvisation. This marrying of great minds and souls is what makes Electric Ascension such a great triumph. This time Coltrane's music not only heats the nearby atmosphere but also chills out your mind".

The Penguin Guide to Jazz awarded the album a "Crown" signifying a recording that the authors "feel a special admiration or affection for".

== Track listing ==
All compositions by John Coltrane

1. - 6:22
2. - 3:51
3. - 4:06
4. - 8:31
5. - 4:12
6. - 1:58
7. - 4:05
8. - 2:05
9. - 7:21
10. - 7:06
11. - 5:49
12. - 8:16
13. - 0:18
- All tracks are untitled

== Personnel ==
- Bruce Ackley - soprano saxophone
- Steve Adams - alto saxophone
- Larry Ochs - tenor saxophone
- Jon Raskin - baritone saxophone
- Chris Brown - electronics
- Nels Cline - electric guitar
- Fred Frith - electric bass
- Ikue Mori - drum machines, sampler
- Donald Robinson - drums
- Otomo Yoshihide - turntables, electronics
- Carla Kihlstedt - violin, effects
- Jenny Scheinman - violin
