= Cutter Heads =

Live album by Fred Frith and Chris Brown
- Released: June 1, 2007
- Recorded: January 2002; August 2004
- Venue: Mills College, Oakland, California
- Genre: Experimental music; free improvisation
- Length: 52:01
- Label: Intakt
- Producer: Intakt Records

Fred Frith chronology
The Stone: Issue Two (2007)	Cutter Heads (2007)	The Sugar Factory (2007)

Cutter Heads is a 2007 live collaborative album of improvised experimental music by Fred Frith and Chris Brown. It was recorded live at Mills College in Oakland, California in January 2002 and August 2004. The album was released by Intakt Records in June 2007.

Frith is an English multi-instrumentalist, composer and improviser. He often collaborates with other musicians, and also works with, and creates music for, film directors and choreographers. Brown is an American pianist and electronic musician who uses interactive electronics to compose music. He also makes his own electronic instruments. Frith and Brown were teachers at Mills college at the time – Frith taught composition and improvisation, and Brown taught electronic music.

== Reception ==
In a review in The Wire, Andy Harilton called Cutter Heads an "excellent album". He wrote that while traditionally guitar and piano are not often used by improvisors because they have similar range and sonority, here Frith and Brown "explore leftfield techniques" that dispels concerns over the use of these instruments. Harilton stated that "one of many delights on [this] consistently inventive album" is "Sings the Foundation", which has a "huge sonic panorama [and] a maelstrom flux that evolves into something close to a free groove".

Writing in eJazzNews, Glenn Astarita described Frith and Brown's duet on Cutter Heads as "semi-controlled noise-music movements and more". He said Frith's "endless ... plucking and sawing" is "nicely balanced" by Brown's "investigative acoustic piano manipulations". Astarita called the album's six tracks, "fragmented tone poems", and added that the duo's "evolutionary manner of spinning an improvised tale" bears fruit – "themes seemingly liquefy and remerge into asymmetrical musical statements".

Roberto Iannapollo described Cutter Heads as "a remarkable set of duets". Reviewing the album in Cadence magazine, he said the improvisations vary from "the harsh and industrial to hyperactive scrabbling activity to an almost lush, languid flow". Iannapollo stated that this is "[o]ne of the finest things I’ve heard from Frith in some time".

Reviewing the album in All About Jazz, Italian music critic Angelo Leonardi wrote that Frith and Brown form "an intense and visionary relationship" (una relazione intensa e visionaria), each drawing on diverse sources to create "a coherent and imaginative fabric" (un tessuto coerente e fantasioso). He said the music on the album often veers in unpredictable directions, sometimes from "abstract chamber music" (astratto camerismo) to "post-free improvisation" (improvvisazione post-free). Leonardi added that, surprisingly, the final track ("The Way You Do the Things") develops more traditionally "within an intensely lyrical framework" (in un quadro intensamente lirico).

== Track listing ==
All tracks composed by Fred Frith and Chris Brown

No.	Title	Length
1.	"Telltale Streamers of Dust"	10:23
2.	"Nothing but Make Me"	9:15
3.	"Swing Like Riddle"	9:17
4.	"Thick Air"	8:04
5.	"Sings the Foundation"	11:20
6.	"The Way You Do the Things"	3:42

Sources: Liner notes

== Personnel ==
- Fred Frith – electric and acoustic guitars
- Chris Brown – piano and electronics

=== Production and artwork ===
- Recorded live at Mills College, Oakland, California, January 2002 and August 2004
- Mixed and edited by Philip Perkins in May 2006 at See a Dog, Hear a Dog Studio, Berkeley, California
- Mastered by Myles Boisen October 2006 at Headless Buddha, Oakland, California
- Produced by Intakt Records
- Executive production by Patrik Landolt
- Cover photography by Heike Liss
- Graphic design by Jonas Schoder

Sources: Liner notes
