= Beat Kennel =

Studio album by Rova Saxophone Quartet
- Released: 1987
- Recorded: April 13–15, 1987
- Studio: Barigozzi Studio, Milano, Italy
- Genre: Jazz
- Length: 39:34
- Label: Black Saint; 120 126-2
- Producer: Giovanni Bonandrini

Rova Saxophone Quartet chronology
The Crowd (1986)	Beat Kennel (1987)	The Aggregate (1988)

Beat Kennel is an album by the Rova Saxophone Quartet recorded in Milan in 1987 for the Italian Black Saint label.

== Reception ==
Professional ratings
Review scores
Source	Rating
Allmusic	4/5 stars
The Penguin Guide to Jazz Recordings	3.5/4 stars

The Allmusic review by Scott Yanow states "ROVA perfectly balances advanced arranged sections with dynamic individual and group improvising on this consistently stimulating set ... The results reward repeated listenings by open-minded avant-garde collectors".

== Track listing ==
1. "El Amor en los Tiempos de la Finca" (Andrew Voigt) – 7:50
2. "The Aggregate" (Jon Raskin) – 10:05
3. "Sportspeak" (Voigt, Raskin, Larry Ochs, Bruce Ackley) – 5:07
4. "Composition 37" (Anthony Braxton) – 5:39
5. "What Was Lost Regained" (Raskin) – 10:53

== Personnel ==
- Bruce Ackley – soprano saxophone
- Andrew Voigt – alto saxophone and sopranino saxophone on "What Was Lost Regained"
- Larry Ochs – tenor saxophone
- Jon Raskin – baritone saxophone and lead alto saxophone on "The Aggregate"
