= Blues for Falasha =

Studio album by Glenn Spearman
- Released: 1999
- Recorded: June 8, 1997
- Studio: Bay Recording, Berkeley, California
- Genre: Free jazz
- Length: 45:54
- Label: Tzadik; TZ 7130
- Producer: Glenn Spearman

Glenn Spearman chronology
Working with the Elements (1999)	Blues for Falasha (1999)	Free Worlds (2000)

Blues for Falasha is a posthumously released album by saxophonist Glenn Spearman. It was recorded on June 8, 1997, at Bay Recording in Berkeley, California, and was released in 1999 by Tzadik Records as part of their Radical Jewish Culture series. On the album, Spearman is joined by saxophonist Larry Ochs, pianist Chris Brown, bassist Lisle Ellis, and percussionists Donald Robinson and William Winant.

Spearman was the son of a black Christian father and a white Jewish mother. The album is the product of musical and spiritual exploration of his Jewish roots, and pays tribute to the Falasha, an Ethiopian tribe who claim to be descended from biblical Jews.

== Reception ==
Professional ratings
Review scores
Source	Rating
AllMusic	4.5/5 stars
The Penguin Guide to Jazz	3/4 stars

In a review for AllMusic, Stacia Proefrock wrote: "there are only fragments of Blues for Falasha that can be pinpointed as specifically Jewish... Instead, a poem... sets the philosophical tone for the album... What follows are three beautiful, inspired compositions that explore themes of pain and loneliness, beauty and delicacy, and heritage... if Glenn Spearman had to leave this world too soon, he certainly knew what to leave behind."

The authors of The Penguin Guide to Jazz Recordings called the track titled "Rituals" "Spearman's attempt to think his way back into a forgotten ancestry for the blues," and stated: "Few artists better represented the cultural collisions of John Zorn's 'Radical Jewish Culture' imprint than Spearman."

Glenn Astarita of All About Jazz commented: "Blues for Falasha hits you from many different angles and reverently displays the tranquillity and inner character of Spearman's music... Blues for Falasha mapped new territory for Spearman yet the essence of his intensity and determination prevails."

Writing for JazzTimes, Duck Baker remarked: "the darkness of Blues for Falasha makes it impossible not to think of composers like Berg whose last works were unintended auto-requiems... the music builds by such imperceptible degrees that the feeling of uneasy restraint pervades even at the most intense moments... The instrumentation and some of the writing evoke Jones-Ali-period Trane, but the rhythm team here actually works better."

In an article for The New York City Jazz Record, Clifford Allen wrote: "Spearman... was a force of nature on the tenor saxophone and his peals of sound came from air and earth in reflection of forebears like John Coltrane, Albert Ayler and Frank Wright.... Blues for Falasha is a deep late offering from one of this music's most intriguing figures."

== Track listing ==
Composed by Glenn Spearman.

1. "The Old Book" – 2:15
2. "Rituals" – 5:26
3. "Cold Water and Dirt" – 10:01
4. "Seed Sounds" – 28:14

== Personnel ==
- Glenn Spearman – tenor saxophone, voice
- Larry Ochs – tenor saxophone, soprano saxophone
- Chris Brown – piano
- Lisle Ellis – bass
- Donald Robinson – drums, percussion
- William Winant – drums, percussion, timpani
