= Complicité (album) =

2001 live album

Live album by Paul Plimley, John Oswald, Marilyn Crispell, and Cecil Taylor
- Released: 2001
- Recorded: May 22, 2000
- Venue: Festival International de Musique Actuelle de Victoriaville, Victoriaville, Quebec
- Genre: Free Jazz
- Label: Les Disques Victo; CD 074–075–076
- Producer: Michel Levasseur

Complicité is a three-CD live album recorded on May 22, 2000, at the Festival International de Musique Actuelle de Victoriaville in Victoriaville, Quebec, and released in 2001 by the Canadian label Les Disques Victo. Disc one features pianist Paul Plimley and saxophonist John Oswald, disc two features pianist Marilyn Crispell, and disc three features pianist Cecil Taylor.

The concert, which occurred on the final night of the festival, was originally planned as a double-bill event with solo sets by Crispell and Taylor. When Taylor's flight was delayed, last-minute arrangements were made to include Plimley and Oswald, who happened to be in town, in his place. Taylor arrived in time, and the concert organizers decided to present all three sets. Taylor dedicated his portion to Jimmy McDonald.

== Reception ==
Professional ratings
Review scores
Source	Rating
AllMusic	4/5 stars

Regarding the Plimley/Oswald duo, AllMusic's François Couture wrote: "The best moment is found in 'Free' where the two players finally connected and put the energy display aside to take the improv down to a simmer for the last two minutes." Concerning Crispell's performance, he stated that it is "the most surprising, very delicate, tonal, melodious, in the vein of her 2001 CD Amarylis." Regarding Taylor's set, Couture commented: "'Congress'... features his energetic jagged playing with pockets of more subtle moments interspersed. 'Meaning' begins with some poetry reading and leads into one of the best pieces on the whole album." He concluded: "Complicité is highly recommendable, but only to the very open-minded free jazz/free improv fan if one wishes to enjoy all three discs.".

Writing for Jazz Times, Bill Bennett stated: "Oswald's... range and Plimley's are complementary, and the pair has obviously devoted plenty of time to understanding each other and their approach to music... Marilyn Crispell charts a course for her audience that is more clearly defined than those of her compeers here... spaces in her playing... seem to carry a romantic resonance, a gentle invitation... no one has better understood the percussive soul of the piano than Taylor, and his ability to create and reprise moving inner voices in the textural and harmonic density of his performances is unique."

David Dacks, in a review for Exclaim!, remarked: "There are many thought provoking moments throughout the three discs, but the edge goes to Crispell's disc."

A reviewer for The Globe and Mail commented: "Complicity? More like heredity. The father of the jazz-piano avant-garde, Cecil Taylor, divides this challenging... set... with two of his 'kids,' Marilyn Crispell and Paul Plimley. Taylor, an unsentimental 71, is still as tough as nails, while the kids -- long since 'grown up' -- have taken a softer line. Crispell is expansive where Taylor continues to be fiercely focused and the Canadian Plimley (duetting with alto saxophonist John Oswald) is almost sprightly where Taylor remains trenchant."

== Track listing ==
=== Disc 1: Paul Plimley / John Oswald ===
1. "Won" (Oswald) – 10:07
2. "To" (Plimley/Oswald) – 6:43
3. "Toon" (Plimley/Oswald) – 5:11
4. "Free" (Plimley/Oswald) – 10:11
5. "Foremost" (Plimley) – 9:14

=== Disc 2: Marilyn Crispell ===
1. "Prayer" (Mitchell Weiss) – 5:34
2. "Triplos, Pt. 1" (Crispell) – 14:36
3. "Gesture Without Plot" (Annette Peacock) – 9:24
4. "Paris" (Mitchell Weiss) – 9:38
5. "Triplos, Pt. 2A" (Crispell) – 6:15
6. "Silence" (Crispell) – 2:40
7. "Triplos, Pt. 2B" (Crispell) – 3:49
8. "Not" (Anders Jormin) – 1:27
9. "Triplos, Pt. 2C" (Crispell) – 5:06

=== Disc 3: Cecil Taylor ===
All compositions by Cecil Taylor.

1. "Congress" – 34:45
2. "Meaning" – 16:29
3. "For Folk" – 4:30
4. "James" – 6:46
5. "Gone" – 1:44

== Personnel ==
- Paul Plimley – piano (disc 1)
- John Oswald – alto saxophone (disc 1)
- Marilyn Crispell – piano (disc 2)
- Cecil Taylor – piano (disc 3)
