= Shiki-Jitsu =

- DVD cover
- Directed by: Hideaki Anno
- Written by: Hideaki Anno
- Based on: Tōhimu by Ayako Fujitani
- Produced by: Miyuki Nanri; Nozomu Takahashi
- Starring: Shunji Iwai; Ayako Fujitani; Jun Murakami; Shinobu Otake
- Cinematography: Yuichi Nagata
- Edited by: Soichi Ueno
- Music by: Takashi Kako
- Production company: Studio Kajino
- Distributed by: Tokuma Shoten
- Release date: 7 December 2000 (Japan)
- Running time: 128 minutes
- Country: Japan
- Language: Japanese

Shiki-Jitsu (Japanese: 式日, Hepburn: Shikijitsu; lit. "Ritual Day" or "Ceremonial Day"), also known as Ritual, is a 2000 Japanese psychological drama film written and directed by Hideaki Anno. It is based on the novella Tōhimu by Ayako Fujitani, who also stars alongside Shunji Iwai.

Like Anno's previous film Love & Pop (1998), Shiki-Jitsu is an art film with experimental elements that dives into the minds of its main characters. The film takes place over 33 days and follows the relationship between an apathetic film director (Iwai) and an odd young woman (Fujitani) who start a bizarre friendship after a chance meeting as they both attempt to work their way out of depression and escapism. Michael Ordona of the Los Angeles Times reported the film had "dark themes of mental illness and suicidal ideation". Shiki-Jitsu won an award for Best Artistic Contribution at the 13th International Film Festival in Tokyo.

== Story ==
The film follows a young director returning to his home city of Ube in Yamaguchi Prefecture, and an eccentric young woman he meets, whose quirks include saying "tomorrow is my birthday" every day and wearing unusual clothing.

A the days go by, it appears that the woman has little touch with reality and is constantly escaping into a fantasy world. The film director, having formerly directed anime, seeks to embrace reality and accordingly, create a "real film". The two eventually fall in love.

In the end, the director confronts the woman with her mother, allowing the woman to make her first steps into the real world. The film ends with her circling December 7 as her actual birthday and the words "beyond the 33rd day: unknown".

== Release ==
The film was produced by Studio Kajino, an offshoot of Studio Ghibli, run by its former president Toshio Suzuki who served on the film as executive producer. It premiered at the Tokyo Photography Museum in Ebisu Garden Place on December 7, 2000.

The film was later released on VHS and DVD by Buena Vista Home Entertainment Japan on July 24, 2003 as part of the "Ghibli Cinematic Library" series. On July 1, 2020, it was released as a video on demand by King Records.

== See also ==
- Gamera - Production of Shiki-Jitsu was partially influenced by the Gamera franchise
