= Th (album) =

Studio album by The Glenn Spearman–John Heward Group
- Released: 1997
- Recorded: May 21 and 22, 1997
- Studio: The Spirit Room, Rossie, New York
- Genre: Free jazz
- Label: CIMP; 148
- Producer: Robert D. Rusch

Glenn Spearman chronology
Surya: Up (1996)	Th (1997)	Let it Go (1997)

Th is an album by the Glenn Spearman–John Heward Group, led by saxophonist Spearman and drummer Heward, and featuring saxophonist Christopher Cauley, violinist David Prentice, and bassist Dominic Duval. It was recorded on May 21 and 22, 1997, at the Spirit Room in Rossie, New York, and was released later that year by the CIMP label.

== Reception ==
Professional ratings
Review scores
Source	Rating
The Penguin Guide to Jazz	3.5/4 stars

The authors of The Penguin Guide to Jazz Recordings called the group "remarkable," and praised the track titled "Summoning," describing it as "extraordinary" and having no precedent in Spearman's or Heward's work to date.

Duck Baker of JazzTimes wrote: "The instrumentation and approach sometimes evoke Ayler groups, which would be dangerous in the case of lesser players, but here all comparisons end favorably... For a time it seemed as if the cathartic first flowering of free jazz couldn't for some reason sustain further growth. This beautiful record is spectacular evidence to the contrary."

In a review for All About Jazz, Derek Taylor stated: "The malleability of the players' associations reflects directly on the music they create. Each man is comfortable contributing to the ensemble space just as easily as he is pulling out the stops through individual solos. What this translates into for the disc is an unflagging level of diversity in its contents."

== Track listing ==
1. "Irreversible Blues" (Spearman) – 10:42
2. "Gathering the Ancestors" (Heward) – 7:51
3. "3 For John" (Spearman) – 8:59
4. "Summoning" (Spearman/Heward) – 5:04
5. "Arista Africanapata" (Spearman) – 9:30
6. "Moment in Time" (Duval) – 10:01
7. "Stone Soup" (Heward) – 6:17
8. "Initiation" (Spearman) – 5:39
9. "The Natural Thing" (Cauley, Prentice, Duval, Spearman, Heward) – 7:17

== Personnel ==
- Glenn Spearman – tenor saxophone, kalimba (track 4), vocals (track 4)
- John Heward – drums, percussion (track 4), vocals (track 4)
- Christopher Cauley – alto saxophone (tracks 1–2, 5–7, 9)
- David Prentice – violin, viola (tracks 1–3, 6, 7)
- Dominic Duval – bass (tracks 1–3, 5–9)
