= Homage to Peace =

Live album by Emergency
- Released: 1973
- Recorded: 1972
- Venue: La Maison de la Radio, Paris
- Genre: Jazz
- Length: 44:25
- Label: America
- Producer: Pierre Berjot

Emergency chronology
Homage to Peace (1973)	Bob Reid Presents: The Best of Emergency (1976)

reissue cover

Homage to Peace is an album by free jazz band Emergency originally released in 1973 on the French America label and reissued on CD in 2004 by Universal France. This date was the first recording by American saxophonist Glenn Spearman, who moved to Paris in 1972 and co-founded this international quintet with bassist Bob Reid along with French guitarist Boulou Ferre and two Japanese musicians: pianist Takashi Kako and drummer Sabu Toyozumi.

== Reception ==
Professional ratings
Review scores
Source	Rating
AllMusic	4.5/5 stars
The Penguin Guide to Jazz Recordings	3.5/4 stars

In his review for AllMusic, Thom Jurek states "A true, fiery blowout of honk and skronk, Spearman observes the dictums of his teacher Frank Wright, and attempts to turn his horn inside out. This is a must for anyone who is interested in the development of free jazz in the 1970s."

== Track listing ==
1. "Emergency Theme" (Gency) – 15:22
2. "People in Sorrow" (Roscoe Mitchell) – 7:57
3. "Kako Tune" (Takashi Kako) – 11:32
4. "Infidels" (Bob Reid) – 9:34

== Personnel ==
- Glenn Spearman – tenor saxophone, soprano saxophone
- Takashi Kako –piano
- Boulou Ferré – electric guitar
- Bob Reid – bass
- Sabu Toyozumi – drums
