= Smokehouse (album) =

Studio album / Live album by Glenn Spearman
- Released: 1994
- Recorded: (1–4, 7) November 10, 1993 (5–6) November 8, 1993
- Studio: (1–4, 7) Bay Studios, Berkeley, California (5–6) Kimball's Carnival, Emeryville, California
- Genre: Jazz
- Length: 75:11
- Label: Black Saint
- Producer: Larry Ochs

Glenn Spearman chronology
Mystery Project (1993)	Smokehouse (1994)	The Fields (1996)

Smokehouse is the second album by American jazz saxophonist Glenn Spearman Double Trio, which was recorded in 1993 and released on the Italian Black Saint label.

== Reception ==
Professional ratings
Review scores
Source	Rating
AllMusic	4/5 stars
The Penguin Guide to Jazz	4/4 stars

In his review for AllMusic, Scott Yanow states "The music, not for the faint-hearted, is avant-garde, dissonant, and full of plenty of honest feeling and high energy. Listeners who enjoy Albert Ayler and Rova will find this passionate effort of strong interest."

The Penguin Guide to Jazz notes "Spearman's time in Europe opened up many interesting compositional ideas to him, but these performances are squarely in the tradition of the 1960s avant-garde, and their strength comes from Spearman's profound conviction that the ideas alumbrated at that time are far from exhausted but still constitute a lingua franca for improvisation."

== Track listing ==
All compositions by Spearman except where noted

1. "Axe, Beautiful Acts (Intake)" – 12:42
2. "No!" (Ochs) – 5:01
3. "Celestial Source" – 5:03
4. "Operation at the Level of the Phrase" – 18:22
5. "Painted with Lightning" – 18:21
6. "Asaph" – 4:56
7. "Axe, Beautiful Acts (Out-take)" – 10:46

== Personnel ==
- Glenn Spearman – tenor sax
- Larry Ochs – tenor sax, sopranino sax
- Donald Robinson – drums
- William Winant – drums
- Ben Lindgren – double bass
- Chris Brown – piano
