= First and Last (album) =

Live album by Glenn Spearman
- Released: 1999
- Recorded: July 25, 1998
- Venue: Fire in the Valley Festival, University of Massachusetts, Amherst, Massachusetts
- Genre: Free jazz
- Length: 43:08
- Label: Eremite; MTE015
- Producer: Michael Ehlers

Glenn Spearman chronology
Let it Go (1997)	First and Last (1999)	Working with the Elements (1999)

First and Last is a live album by saxophonist Glenn Spearman. It was recorded on July 25, 1998, at the Fire in the Valley Festival in Amherst, Massachusetts, and was released in 1999 by Eremite Records. On the album, Spearman is joined by pianist Matthew Goodheart and drummer Rashid Bakr. It was Spearman's last recording before his death less than three months later.

== Reception ==
Professional ratings
Review scores
Source	Rating
AllMusic	4.5/5 stars
The Penguin Guide to Jazz	2/4 stars

In a review for AllMusic, Steve Loewy wrote: "This is energetic music of the highest order, a fitting memorial to one the unsung jazz legends who could sing on his horn with the best of them, but who never entirely received his due during his lifetime. This recording should help to place his forceful and very spiritual spirit in proper perspective."

The authors of The Penguin Guide to Jazz Recordings called the album "an unhappy affair... at moments barely coherent," and stated: "it weaves awkwardly between intense insight... and a prosy banality."

A reviewer for All About Jazz commented: "Playing melodic or howling freely, Spearman spans the emotional spectrum from quiet contemplation to uneasy tension to all-out screaming release. Plenty of post-Ayler playing... Fans of Frank Wright, Albert Ayler, or Jimmy Lyons should grab this record to hear one of the greatest exponents of this tradition."

Author Phil Freeman remarked: "Spearman is in full voice throughout, bellowing when he wants to, murmuring at other times, but never aiming for a note he's unable to reach. His disease never took away his voice until it stifled him for good... the sheer historic importance of the session makes it a must... It's Glenn Spearman's last gift to the world, and it's definitely worth keeping around."

== Track listing ==
1. "Intertextual Reference" (Goodheart) – 21:10
2. "Under the Incalculable Sky, Listless, Diseased with Stars" (Spearman, Goodheart, Bakr) – 21:59

== Personnel ==
- Glenn Spearman – tenor saxophone
- Matthew Goodheart – piano
- Rashid Bakr – drums
