= Bingo (Rova Saxophone Quartet album) =

Studio album by Rova Saxophone Quartet
- Released: 1998
- Recorded: April 1996
- Studio: Studios Sharkbite, Oakland, California
- Genre: Free jazz
- Length: 64:00
- Label: Les Disques Victo VICTO CD 056
- Producer: ROVA

Rova Saxophone Quartet chronology
Morphological Echo (1998)	Bingo (1998)	The Works (Volume 3) (1999)

Bingo is an album by the Rova Saxophone Quartet featuring compositions by Lindsay Cooper, Barry Guy, Fred Frith, and Larry Ochs which was recorded in 1996 and released on the Canadian Victo label.

== Reception ==
Professional ratings
Review scores
Source	Rating
AllMusic	4.5/5 stars
Penguin Guide to Jazz	4/4 stars

Allmusic gave the album a 4½-star rating while its review by Thom Jurek stated, "Rova's dedication, mastery, and almost magical interplay make this one of the quartet's most sophisticated and enjoyable records, but also its most accessible. This is a brilliant recording by a truly gifted group".

The Penguin Guide to Jazz nominated the album as part of its "Core Collection" of recommended jazz recordings.

== Track listing ==
1. "Face in the Crowd" (Lindsay Cooper) – 11:52
2. "Initials" (Larry Ochs) – 13:52
3. "Witch Gong Game" (Barry Guy) – 4:43
4. "Water Under the Bridge" (Fred Frith) – 5:43
5. "Can of Worms" (Cooper) – 5:45
6. "Witch Gong Game" (Guy) – 25:43

== Personnel ==
- Bruce Ackley – soprano saxophone, tenor saxophone
- Steve Adams – alto saxophone, sopranino saxophone
- Larry Ochs – tenor saxophone, sopranino saxophone
- Jon Raskin – baritone saxophone, alto saxophone, sopranino saxophone
