= Free Worlds =

Studio album by Glenn Spearman
- Released: 2000
- Recorded: 1994–1995
- Studio: San Francisco, California; Oakland, California
- Genre: Free jazz
- Length: 1:14:13
- Label: Black Saint; 120207-2
- Producer: Don Paul

Glenn Spearman chronology
Blues for Falasha (1999)	Free Worlds (2000)

Free Worlds is a posthumously released album by saxophonist Glenn Spearman. It was recorded during 1994 and 1995 in San Francisco and Oakland, California, and was released in 2000 by the Black Saint label. The album features Spearman in four different ensemble settings, with musicians including saxophonist Marco Eneidi, trumpeter Raphe Malik, guitarists J.R. Routhier and Dhyani Dharma Mas, pianist Paul Plimley, keyboardist John Baker, bassist Lisle Ellis, drummer Donald Robinson, percussionist Tim Witter, and vocalists Shafqat Ali Khan, Ustad Salamat Ali Khan, and Don Paul.

== Reception ==
Professional ratings
Review scores
Source	Rating
AllMusic	4.5/5 stars
The Penguin Guide to Jazz	2.5/4 stars

In a review for AllMusic, Alex Henderson wrote: "The Californian's integrity shines through... Sometimes reflective, sometimes forceful, and always uncompromising, this CD reminds us how honest a player Spearman was... While those who believe that hard bop is the only form of jazz that has a right to exist would do well to look elsewhere, Free Worlds is recommended to those with a taste for free jazz and the avant-garde."

The authors of The Penguin Guide to Jazz Recordings called the album "more instructive than genuinely satisfying," noting that "Spearman's freedom seems more than a little forced... and there is less melodic control than on the later sessions which were to represent his premature last word."

Derk Richardson of the San Francisco Chronicle's SFGate commented: "Spearman took the musical innovations and philosophical quests of Cecil Taylor and John Coltrane to heart and then poured out his own through his horn. This is music of discipline and abandon, focused channeling and free-form energy, a logical extension of the jazz spirit beyond the constraints of a commercialized tradition."

A writer for CMJ New Music Report included the album in the "Must Hear" column, stating that the sextet tracks take "the music to the energetic outer limits."

== Track listing ==
1. "Blare" (Glenn Spearman) – 9:21
2. "Long Forward Pasts" (Donald Robinson, Glenn Spearman, Lisle Ellis, Paul Plimley) – 11:38
3. "Fields Before the Ram" (Glenn Spearman) – 12:27
4. "Raga Shamwati" (Traditional) – 9:23
5. "The Skin She Bears" (Don Paul, Donald Robinson, Glenn Spearman, J.R. Routhier) – 3:52
6. "Graduation" (Glenn Spearman) – 10:04
7. "Pipes, Spirit & Bronze" (Glenn Spearman) – 5:53
8. "Lyons Roars" (Glenn Spearman) – 11:35
- Tracks 1, 3, 6, and 8 were recorded during May 1994 at Mobius Music in San Francisco. Tracks 2 and 7 were recorded during June 1994 at Mobius Music in San Francisco. Track 4 was recorded during June 1995 at Sharkbite Studio in Oakland, California. Track 5 was recorded during December 1994 at Guerilla Euphonics in Oakland, California.

== Personnel ==
- Glenn Spearman – tenor saxophone
- Marco Eneidi – alto saxophone (tracks 1, 3, 6, and 8)
- Raphe Malik – trumpet (tracks 1, 3, 6, and 8)
- J.R. Routhier – electric guitar (tracks 1, 3, 5, 6, and 8)
- Dhyani Dharma Mas – acoustic guitar (track 4)
- Paul Plimley – piano (tracks 2 and 7)
- John Baker – synthesizer (track 4)
- Lisle Ellis – double bass (tracks 1–3, 6–8)
- Donald Robinson – drums (tracks 1–3, 5–8)
- Tim Witter – tabla (track 4)
- Shafqat Ali Khan – voice (track 4)
- Ustad Salamat Ali Khan – voice (track 4)
- Don Paul – voice (track 5)
