= Totally Spinning =

Studio album by ROVA
- Released: 2006
- Recorded: April 14, 1996 and November 18 & 19, 2000
- Studio: Sharkbite Studios, Oakland, CA and Mr. Toads, San Francisco, CA
- Genre: Jazz
- Length: 39:34
- Label: Black Saint; 120 206-2
- Producer: ROVA

Rova Saxophone Quartet chronology
Electric Ascension (2005)	Totally Spinning (2006)	Juke Box Suite (2006)

Totally Spinning is an album by the Rova Saxophone Quartet recorded in 1996 for the Italian Black Saint label but not released until 2006.

== Reception ==
Professional ratings
Review scores
Source	Rating
Allmusic	4/5 stars
All About Jazz	3.5/5 stars

The Allmusic review by Scott Yanow states "This is one of Rova's more accessible projects, although the music certainly has its adventurous and passionate moments. Recommended". On All About Jazz Jeff Stockton said it was "as approachable as Rova gets, an enjoyably listenable point of entry into the work of this groundbreaking veteran group".

== Track listing ==
1. "Let's Go Totally Spinning" (Jon Raskin) – 8:08
2. "Stiction" (Steve Adams) – 6:35
3. "Radar" (Raskin, Adams, Bruce Ackley, Larry Ochs) – 4:02
4. "Cuernavaca Starlight" (Adams) – 7:54
5. "Kick It" (Fred Frith) – 3:40
6. "It's a Journey, Not a Destination" (Raskin) – 15:49
7. "Preshrunk" (Adams) – 5:37
8. "Radar (Version 731)" (Raskin, Adams, Ackley, Ochs) – 8:11
- Recorded on April 14, 1996, at Sharkbite Studios, Oakland, CA (tracks 1 & 2) and November 18 & 19, 2000 at Mr. Toads, San Francisco, CA (tracks 3–8)

== Personnel ==
- Bruce Ackley – soprano saxophone
- Steve Adams – alto saxophone, sopranino saxophone
- Larry Ochs – tenor saxophone, sopranino saxophone
- Jon Raskin – baritone saxophone
