= The Fields (album) =

Studio album by Glenn Spearman
- Released: 1996
- Recorded: November 15–16, 1994
- Studio: Bay Studios, Berkeley, California
- Genre: Jazz
- Length: 76:31
- Label: Black Saint
- Producer: Don Paul, Larry Ochs

Glenn Spearman chronology
Smokehouse (1994)	The Fields (1996)	Surya: Stretching the Edge (1996)

The Fields is the third album by the American jazz saxophonist Glenn Spearman Double Trio, recorded in 1994 and released on the Italian Black Saint label.

== Reception ==
Professional ratings
Review scores
Source	Rating
AllMusic	3/5 stars
The Penguin Guide to Jazz	3/4 stars

The Penguin Guide to Jazz notes that "[t]he supporting cast is strong and supportive, though very often the band seem to be playing set charts while the two horns duel in the foreground."

== Track listing ==
All compositions by Spearman except where noted

1. "Melts" (Ochs) – 15:11
2. "Fields Before the Ram" – 12:39
3. "Hot" – 3:39
4. "Stepping Out" – 9:39
5. "Extrapolation of the Inevitable" – 8:59
6. "Just There" (Ochs) – 5:13
7. "Sound Section" – 21:11

== Personnel ==
- Glenn Spearman – tenor sax
- Larry Ochs – tenor sax, sopranino sax
- William Winant – drums, tympani
- Donald Robinson – drums
- Chris Brown – piano
- Lisle Ellis – double bass
