= Stephen Medaris Bull =

American inventor, technologist, and media producer

- Education: New York University Interactive Telecommunications Program
- Occupations: Inventor, technologist, media producer
- Known for: Cellphonia, wearable negative pressure ventilator prototyping, Margaret Sanger: A Public Nuisance

Stephen Medaris Bull is an American inventor, mixed-media technologist, and media producer whose work spans experimental mobile media, interactive installation, and practical medical device invention.

He is known for co-creating Cellphonia, a participatory mobile phone opera presented at international arts and technology festivals, for teaching and developing interactive media at New York University's Interactive Telecommunications Program (ITP), and for patents ranging from a space station concept to a modern wearable negative pressure ventilator.

His media production credits include the documentary Margaret Sanger: A Public Nuisance, and his mobile and locative works have been supported and exhibited by arts organizations in the United States and abroad.

== Education ==
Bull graduated from New York University in 1997.

== Career ==
Bull's early media work includes directing the documentary Margaret Sanger: A Public Nuisance, distributed by Women Make Movies, which profiles the activist's use of mass culture to advocate for birth control. He is also listed in the Film-Makers’ Cooperative catalogue, which documents additional short works and provides a professional biography of his mixed-media practice.

From the mid-2000s, Bull focused on mobile phone based artworks under the umbrella project Cellphonia, a participatory system that composes and streams audience-contributed vocals captured over telephony. Cellphonia projects were presented at the ISEA ZeroOne festival in San Jose in 2006, among other venues documented by festival and institutional archives. His installation Cellphonia: 4'33" was included in the installation proceedings of the International Conference on New Interfaces for Musical Expression in 2009. He has worked with institutions such as the New York State Council on the Arts, Experimental Television Center, and Harvestworks.

Bull produced mobile tours for cultural institutions, including work commissioned by the New-York Historical Society connected to its two-year initiative on the history of slavery in New York, which developed walking and mobile phone tours as part of public programming.

In response to respiratory-care needs highlighted during the COVID-19 pandemic, Bull founded an effort later known as Breathe Global to advance a portable negative pressure ventilator concept called Venti, which was informed by his patent filings and community prototyping. He worked with a high school student to assemble and test early versions of a wearable iron lung device during the initial pandemic wave.

== Research ==
Bull's practice intersects with research in mobile music, ubiquitous computing, and human participation in instrument design, with documentation of his installations and methods in the NIME installation proceedings and in the archival record of ISEA. His work also extends to speculative engineering and aerospace concepts; the United States Patent and Trademark Office records show he was granted a patent in 1988 for a space station designed to be launched as a single payload and then deployed in orbit. Subsequent intellectual property disclosures include a 2022 United States patent application for a cuirass-style negative pressure ventilator with reconfigurable components and Internet of Things capabilities.
