= The Quarry (1998 film) =

1998 film directed by Marion Hänsel

The Quarry (French: La faille) is a 1998 mystery drama film written and directed by Marion Hänsel, based on the 1995 novel of the same name by Damon Galgut. It jointly won Grand Prix des Amériques, the main prize at the Montreal World Film Festival ex aequo with Full Moon. It was a co-production between Belgium, France, the Netherlands and Spain.
