= Glenn Spearman =

American jazz musician

Glenn Spearman (February 14, 1947 – October 8, 1998) was an American jazz tenor saxophonist. He was associated with free jazz and experimental music.

Spearman was active in Oakland, California, in the late 1960s but moved to Paris in 1972 and founded the band Emergency with bassist Bob Reid. This group recorded two albums, performed on radio and television in France, and appeared at the festival in Avignon. He was artist-in-residence in Rotterdam and toured through Europe before returning to the United States in 1978.

Following his return he worked in the Cecil Taylor Unit, primarily out of San Francisco though he performed on both sides of the Atlantic through the 1980s. In the 1990s, he led the Double Trio which included Larry Ochs, William Winant, and Lisle Ellis as sidemen; this ensemble played at the Monterey Jazz Festival and the Vancouver International Jazz Festival. They were commissioned for a piece by the Move Dance Theater which was performed at Laney College. He worked with the Rova Saxophone Quartet and with filmmaker Lynn Marie Kirby in addition to teaching at Mills College. He died of cancer in 1998.

== Discography ==
=== As leader or co-leader ===
- Night After Night (Musa-Physics, 1981)
- Utterance (Cadence, 1990)
- Mystery Project (Black Saint, 1993)
- Smokehouse (Black Saint, 1994)
- The Fields (Black Saint, 1996)
- Surya: Stretching the Edge (Surya, 1996)
- Surya: Up (Surya, 1996)
- Th (CIMP, 1997)
- Let it Go (Red Toucan, 1997)
- First and Last (Eremite, 1999)
- Working with the Elements with Dominic Duval (CIMP, 1999)
- Blues for Falasha (Tzadik, 1999)
- Free Worlds (Black Saint, 2000)

With Emergency

- Homage to Peace (America, 1973)
- Bob Reid Presents: The Best of Emergency (Kwela, 1976)

With Marco Eneidi

- Creative Music Orchestra (Music & Arts, 1997)

With Trio Hurricane

- Suite of Winds (Black Saint, 1986)
- Live at Fire in the Valley (Eremite, 1997)

=== As sideman ===
With Raphe Malik

- 21st Century Texts (FMP, 1992)
- Sirens Sweet & Slow (Out Sounds, 1994)
- The Short Form (Eremite, 1997)
- Companions (Eremite, 2002)

With others

- Pipe Dreams, Figure 8 (Rova Saxophone Quartet x 2) (1994)
- Elevations, Lisle Ellis (1995)
- Marco Eneidi & the Jungle Orchestra, Marco Eneidi (1996)
- Mindfulness, William Hooker (Knitting Factory, 1997)
- Live at Radio Valencia with Marco Eneidi, William Parker, Jackson Krall (Botticelli)
