= Studio Kajino =

Japanese animation studio

Studio Kajino (スタジオカジノ, Sutajio Kajino) is a subsidiary of Japanese animation company Studio Ghibli. It was created prior to 2000 by Ghibli animator Yoshiyuki Momose to handle live action films for the studio. Kajino is run by Ghibli's president Toshio Suzuki, and its first release was Shiki-Jitsu in 2000. In 2001, Studio Kajino co-produced Katsuyuki Motohiro's film Satorare, but was not credited. However, the studio's involvement is acknowledged through an extra feature on the R3 DVD, entitled "Ghibli Studio".

== Works ==
=== Films ===
- Shiki-Jitsu
- Satorare

=== Music videos ===
- capsule – "Portable Airport"
- capsule – "Space Station No.9"
- capsule – "A Flying City Plan"
