= Mark Trayle =

American musician (1955–2015)

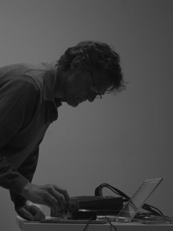
- Trayle at Sea and Space Gallery : photo Lara Bank

Background information
- Born: Mark Evan Garrabrant; 17 January 1955; San Jose, California, U.S.
- Died: 18 February 2015 (aged 60) Ventura, California
- Genres: Electronic, installation, improvisation
- Occupation: Musician
- Labels: Nonesuch, Artifact, Atavistic, Nine Winds, Tzadik
- Member of: The Hub
- Website: www.marktrayle.com

Mark Trayle (January 17, 1955, in San Jose, California – February 18, 2015, in Ventura, California), born Mark Evan Garrabrant, was a California-based musician and sound artist working in a variety of media including live electronic music, improvisation, installations, and compositions for chamber ensembles. His work has been noted for its use of re-engineered consumer products and cultural artifacts as interfaces for electronic music performances and networked media installations.

== Biography ==
Mark Trayle studied composition at the University of Oregon with Homer Keller and at Mills College with Robert Ashley, David Behrman, and David Rosenboom. Under Berhman's tutelage, he began building hybrid digital-analog electronics and used those (often with electric guitar and homemade performance interfaces) throughout the 1980s. From the late 1980s through the mid-1990s his work focused on the use of alternative performance interfaces to guide algorithmic compositions, as well as composing for and performing with The Hub. He also made his first sound/media installations during this period. In 1996 he moved from the San Francisco area to Southern California to teach at CalArts. Soon after, he composed several pieces for acoustic instruments with electronics. True North, Periodic Transmissions at Regular Intervals (are not allowed), and Propagation, Reflection, and Absorption are entirely acoustic in nature but use electronics and sensors to create real-time scores for the performers. Later works such as bitpool, sierranevada, and Bender use electronics that allow the players to trigger electroacoustic sounds.

Trayle's music has been the subject of articles in Strumenti Musicali and Virtual (Italy), Keyboard, and "Escape Velocity: Cyberculture at the End of the Century" (Grove/Atlantic), and he has written articles for Leonardo Music Journal (US/UK) and MusikTexte (Germany). He has recorded for the Artifact, Atavistic Records, CRI, Creative Sources, Inial, Los Angeles River, Elektra/Nonesuch, and Tzadik labels. He taught in the Herb Alpert School of Music at CalArts from 1996 - 2015.

Mark Trayle died on February 18, 2015, of pancreatic cancer, in his home in Ventura, CA.

== Performance ==
Trayle has performed and exhibited at experimental music and new media venues and festivals in the U.S., Canada, and Europe. He has received grants from Arts International, the American Composers Forum, The Japan Foundation, and the National Endowment for the Arts. Commissions have come from Radio Bremen, Champs D’Action, Ensemble Zwischentoene, Kammerensemble Neue Musik Berlin, and Ensemble Mosaik. He has been an artist-in-residence at Mills College, STEIM, and The LAB.

== Discography ==
- Five Lines (quintet project with Casey Anderson, Jason Kahn, Norbert Möslang, Günter Müller) Mikroton Recordings
- Timelines Los Angeles Jason Kahn Creative Sources
- Stationary (duo project with Toshimaru Nakamura) Creative Sources
- Goldstripe Creative Sources
- Boundary Layer (The Hub) Tzadik
- Die Zeit, Eine Gebrauchsanweisung (Michael Wertmueller) GROB
- Luminous Axis (Wadada Leo Smith) Tzadik
- RPM::MHZ Artifact
- Music for Woodwinds & Electronics (Vinny Golia + Mark Trayle) Nine Winds
- Transmigration Music (compilation) CDCM/Centaur
- Light Upon Light (Wadada Leo Smith) Tzadik
- The Extended Flute (Maggi Payne) CRI
- State of The Union (compilation) Atavistic
- Wreckin' Ball (The Hub) Artifact
- Etudes and Bagatelles Artifact
- Computer Network Music (The Hub) Artifact
- Imaginary Landscapes (compilation) Elektra/Nonesuch
- Yes, Philip, Androids Dream Electric Sheep (Daniel Rothman) Los Angeles River Records
- Heart's Reflections (Wadada Leo Smith) Cuneiform
