= William Winant =

American percussionist

William Winant (born 1953) is an American percussionist.

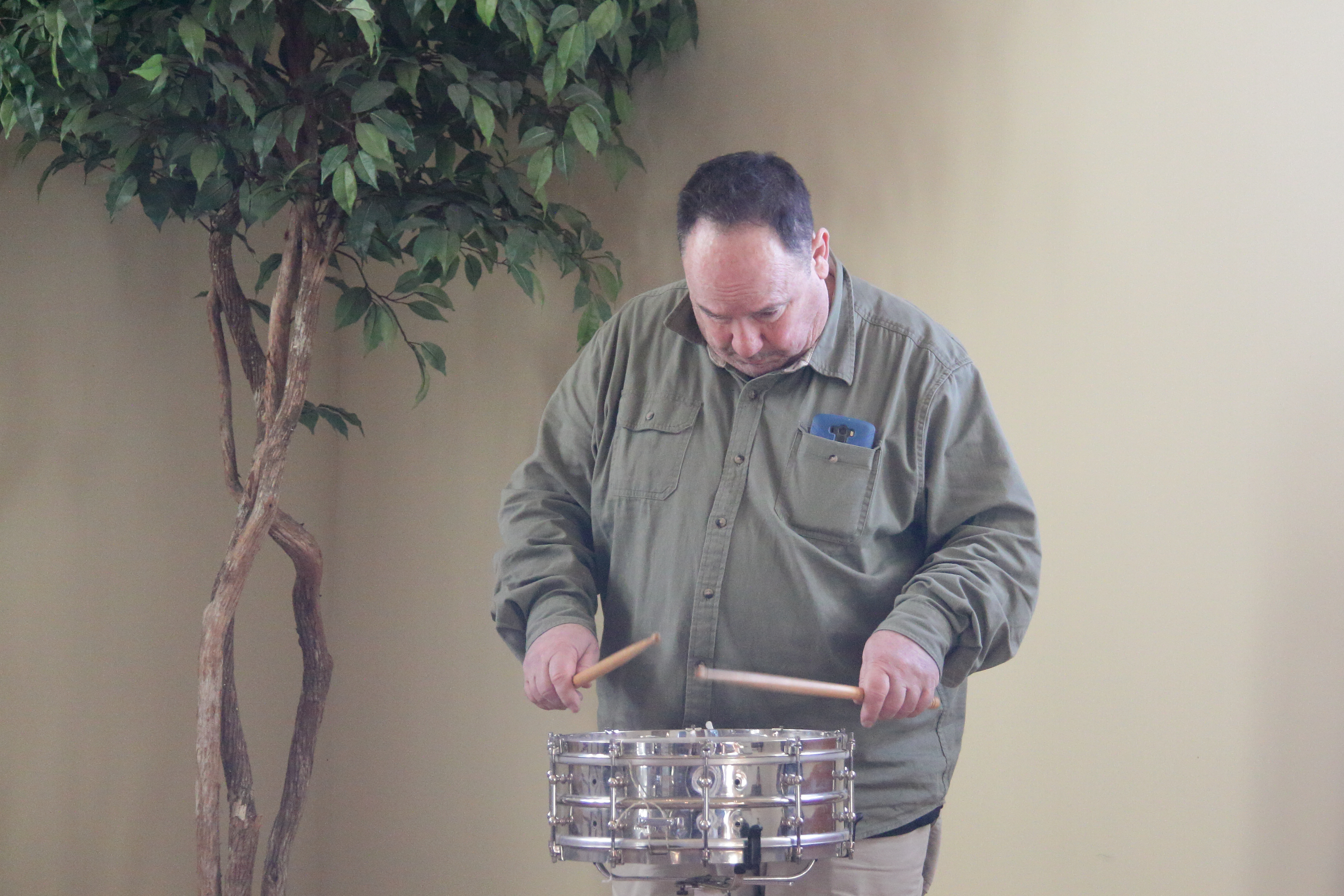
Winant in 2016

In addition to his work in contemporary classical music—notably performing Lou Harrison's compositions—Winant has worked in a variety of genres, including noise rock, free improvisation and jazz. Notable collaborators include Glenn Spearman, Thurston Moore, Sonic Youth, Mr. Bungle (with whom he toured in support of their albums Disco Volante and California), Secret Chiefs 3, Mondo Cane and Oingo Boingo. A member of the Abel-Steinberg-Winant Trio, he has also frequently collaborated with John Zorn. He received a Foundation for Contemporary Arts Grants to Artists award (2016).

Winant attended the California Institute of the Arts for a couple of years before dropping out to go tour with Oingo Boingo. He later received an undergraduate degree from York University before pursuing graduate work at Mills College in Oakland, California, where he is currently a faculty member. He also gives percussion lessons and teaches the percussion ensemble at the University of California, Santa Cruz.

== Films ==
- 1995 - Musical Outsiders: An American Legacy - Harry Partch, Lou Harrison, and Terry Riley. Directed by Michael Blackwood.

== Discography ==
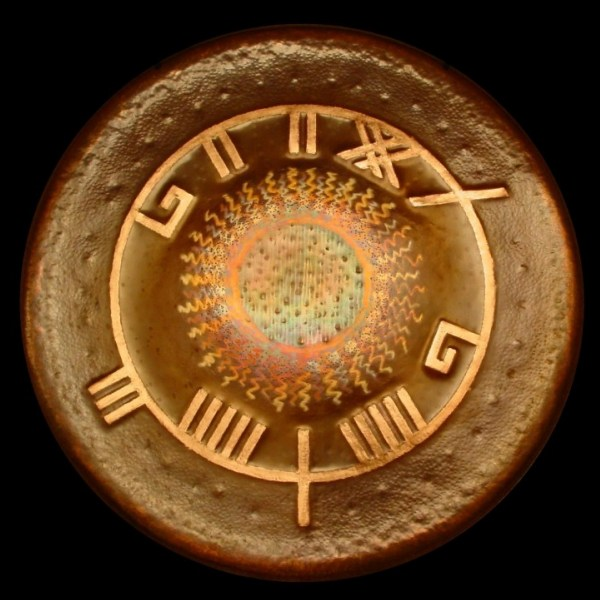
William Winant's bronze gong (28 inches diameter) made by the English drummer and musical instrument maker Matt Nolan. The characters are in the ancient Irish writing system Ogham. The text is read from top in the clockwise direction: ᚛ᚗᚂᚂᚘᚋ ᚗᚅᚐᚅᚈ᚜. Transcription: UILLIAM UINANT (William Winant).

Productions under the direction of Winant

- Lou Harrison – La Koro Sutro (1988)
- Bun-Ching Lam – ...Like Water (Tzadik, 1997)
- Luc Ferrari – Cellule 75 (Tzadik, 1998) with Chris Brown
- Christian Wolff – Burdocks (Tzadik, 2001)
- Lou Harrison – Drums Along the Pacific (New Albion, 2003)
- Peter Garland – Love Songs (Tzadik, 2005) All pieces written for Winant.
- Fred Frith – Back to Life (Tzadik, 2008)

As equal member of groups and projects

- White Out (with Jim O'Rourke) – China Is Near (ATP, 2005)
- Gratkowski / Brown / Winant (with Frank Gratkowski and Chris Brown) – Wake (Red Toukan, 2009)
- Gratkowski / Brown / Winant and Gerhard E. Winkler – Vermilion Traces / Donaueschingen 2009 (Leo, 2012)

With Chris Brown

- Room with Larry Ochs (Sound Aspects, 1989)
- Lava (Tzadik, 1995)
- Duets (1996), Winant only on "Duo"
- Rouge Wave (2005)
- Iconicities (New Albion, 2011)

With John Cage, Joan LaBarbara

- John Cage at Summerstage with Leonard Stein (rec. 1992, Music and Arts Programs of America, 1995)
- Music for 17 with the San Francisco Symphony Players, Stephen L. Mosko (1993)

With Alvin Curran

- Theme Park (Tzadik, 1998)

With Danny Elfman

- Batman Returns (1992)

With Fred Frith

- Eleventh Hour (Winter & Winter/WDR 3, 2005) Winant plays guitars on Stick Figurs (for 6 Guitars and 2 Players, 1990)
- The Happy End Problem (Music for Dance) (Fred, 2006)

With Lou Harrison

- Double Concerto (1983)
- First Recordings, Solstice, and Ariadne (1990)
- 3rd Symphony with Dennis Russell Davies, Cabrillo Festival Orchestra (1990)

With Jon Hassell

- Vernal Equinox (1977)

With Joan Jeanrenaud

- Strange Toys (2008)

With Alvin Lucier

- Still and Moving Lines of Silence in Families of Hyperbolas Part II Numbers 5-8 (1984, reissue 2003)

With Roscoe Mitchell

- Numbers (RogueArt, 2011)
- Angel City (RogueArt, 2012)
- Bells for the South Side (ECM, 2017)

With Thurston Moore and Tom Surgal

- Piece for Jetsun Dolma (Les Éditions Victoriaville, 1996)
- Lost to the City / Noise to Nowhere (Intakt, 2000)

With Mr. Bungle

- Disco Volante (Warner Bros., 1995)
- California (Warner Bros., 1998)

With Mike Patton

- Pranzo Oltranzista (Tzadik, 1997) with John Zorn, Marc Ribot and Eric Friedlander

With Secret Chiefs 3

- Zulfikar II (1998)
- Hurqala: 2nd Grand Constitution & Bylaws (1998)
- Book M (2001)
- Path of Most Resistance (2007)

With Glenn Spearman

- Mystery Project (1993)
- Smokehouse (1994)
- The Fields (1996)
- Blues for Falasha (Tzadik, 1999)

With David Tanenbaum

- Lou Harrison – Serenado (New Albion, 2003, expanded reissue of The Perilous Chapel)
- Terry Riley – Book of Abbeyozzud (New Albion, 1999)

With James Tenney

- Karlheinz Stockhausen – Kontakte (Recorded 1978, Ecstatic Peace, 1997) first live recording of “Kontakte” (1959/60)

With John Zorn

- Elegy (Eva, 1992)
- Kristallnacht (Eva, 1993)
- Music for Children (Tzadik, 1998)
- Xu Feng (Tzadik, 2000)
- Chimeras (Tzadik, 2003)
- Rituals (Tzadik, 2004)
- From Silence to Sorcery (Tzadik, 2007)
- Music and Its Double (Tzadik, 2012)
- Fragmentations, Prayers and Interjections (Tzadik, 2014)
