= John Bischoff (musician) =

American composer, musical performer and teacher (b.1949)

John Lee Bischoff (born December 7, 1949) is an American composer, musical performer, teacher and grassroots activist best known as an early pioneer of live computer music. He also gained fame for his solo constructions in real-time synthesis as well as his ground-breaking work in computer network bands.

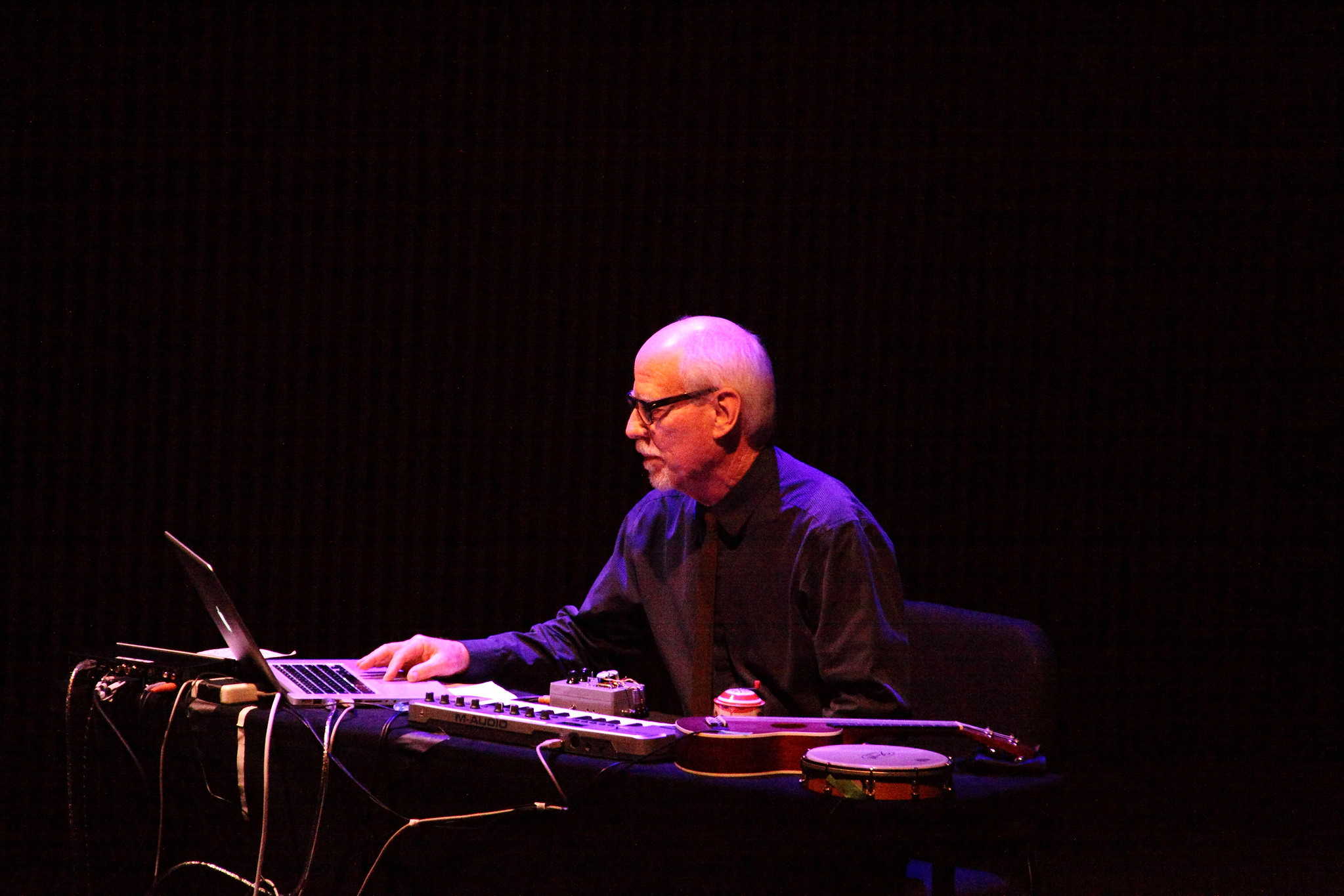
Close up of John Bischoff performing at Other Minds Festival 19 in San Francisco, 2014.

== Early life ==
A native of San Francisco, John Bischoff is the son of painter Elmer Bischoff. After earning his Bachelor of Fine Arts degree from California Institute of the Arts in 1971 and his Master of Fine Arts from Oakland's Mills College in 1973, he studied composition with Robert Moran, James Tenney and Robert Ashley.

== Career ==
He became active in the San Francisco Bay Area experimental music scene where he spent over 25 years performing, composing and teaching. He has participated in San Francisco's New Music America festival in 1981 and New York City's in 1989, where he also performed at Experimental Intermedia and Roulette Intermedium as well as at Los Angeles' Beyond Music Festival.

Bischoff's performance venues in Europe have included the Festival d'Automne in Paris, Akademie der Kunst in Berlin, Fylkingen in Stockholm, and TUBE in Munich. In 1978 he was a founding member of the League of Automatic Music Composers, considered to be the world's first Computer Network Band, and he co-authored an article on the League's music that appears in Foundations of Computer Music (MIT Press, 1985). He was also a founding member of the network band The Hub with which he performed and recorded from 1985 to 1996. Bischoff received a 1999 Foundation for Contemporary Arts Grants to Artists Award.

John Bischoff has continued as a visiting professor and composer at Mills College and is associated with its Center for Contemporary Music.

== Recordings ==
Recordings of John Bischoff's work are available on:

- Lovely Music
- Frog Peak
- Artifact Recordings

A solo album, APERTURE is available on:

- 23FIVE INC
