= Rova Saxophone Quartet =

American saxophone group founded 1977

- The quartet at the 2015 Garden of Memory Concert.

Background information
- Origin: San Francisco, California, U.S.
- Genre: Avant-garde jazz
- Years active: 1977–present
- Labels: Metalanguage, Black Saint
- Members: Jon Raskin; Larry Ochs; Bruce Ackley; Steve Adams
- Past members: Andrew Voight

Rova Saxophone Quartet is an American, San Francisco–based saxophone quartet, formed in October 1977. The name "Rova" is an acronym formed from the last initials of the founding members: Jon Raskin, Larry Ochs, Andrew Voigt, and Bruce Ackley. When Voigt left in 1988, he was replaced by Steve Adams, but the group did not change the acronym.

== Music ==
The quartet's music was inspired by a broad spectrum of influences, such as John Cage, John Coltrane, Ornette Coleman, Anthony Braxton, Steve Lacy, Charles Ives, Edgard Varése, and Olivier Messiaen. Its debut album, Cinema Rovaté, was released by Metalanguage Records in 1978. Metalanguage was founded in 1978 by Henry Kaiser and Ochs. It showcased Rova as well as many independent artists and produced the Rova Arts Festival in 1980. Rova's tour of the Soviet Union in 1983 was filmed and shown on PBS. In 1985, it became a non-profit organization.

== Reception ==
In noting Rova's role in developing the all-saxophone ensemble as "a regular and conceptually wide-ranging unit," The Penguin Guide to Jazz calls its music "a teeming cosmos of saxophone sounds" created by "deliberately eschewing conventional notions about swing [and] prodding at the boundaries of sound and space...."

Jazz: The Rough Guide notes, "Highly inventive, eclectic and willing to experiment, Rova [is] arguably the most exciting of the saxophone quartets to emerge in the format's late 1970s boom."

== Discography ==
- 1978 Cinema Rovaté (Metalanguage)
- 1979 The Bay (Ictus)
- 1979 The Removal of Secrecy (Metalanguage)
- 1979 Daredevils (Metalanguage)
- 1980 This, This, This, This (Moers)
- 1981 As Was (Metalanguage)
- 1985 Saxophone Diplomacy (Hathut)
- 1984 Favorite Street (Black Saint)
- 1986 The Crowd (Hathut)
- 1987 Beat Kennel (Black Saint)
- 1989 The Aggregate (Sound Aspects)
- 1990 Long on Logic (Sound Aspects)
- 1990 Electric Rags II (New Albion)
- 1991 This Time We Are Both
- 1993 From the Bureau of Both (Black Saint)
- 1995 The Works Vol. 1 (Black Saint)
- 1996 The Works Vol. 2 (Black Saint)
- 1996 John Coltrane’s Ascension (Black Saint)
- 1996 Ptow!! (Victo)
- 1998 Bingo (Victo)
- 1998 Morphological Echo (Rastascan)
- 1999 The Works Vol. 3 (Black Saint)
- 1999 Freedom in Fragments
- 2002 Resistance (Victo)
- 2005 Electric Ascension (Atavistic)
- 2006 Totally Spinning (Black Saint)
- 2006 The Mirror World (Metalanguage)
- 2007 Juke Box Suite (Not Two)
- 2010 Planetary (Solyd)
- 2011 The Celestial Septet (New World) with The Nels Cline Singers
- 2011 The Receiving Surfaces (Metalanguage; limited edition LP as a sax quintet with John Zorn)
- 2012 A Short History (Jazzwerkstatt)
- 2016 Rova Channeling Coltrane Electric Ascension
- 2017 Steve Lacy's Saxophone Special Revisited (Clean Feed)
