= Larry Ochs (musician) =

American jazz saxophonist

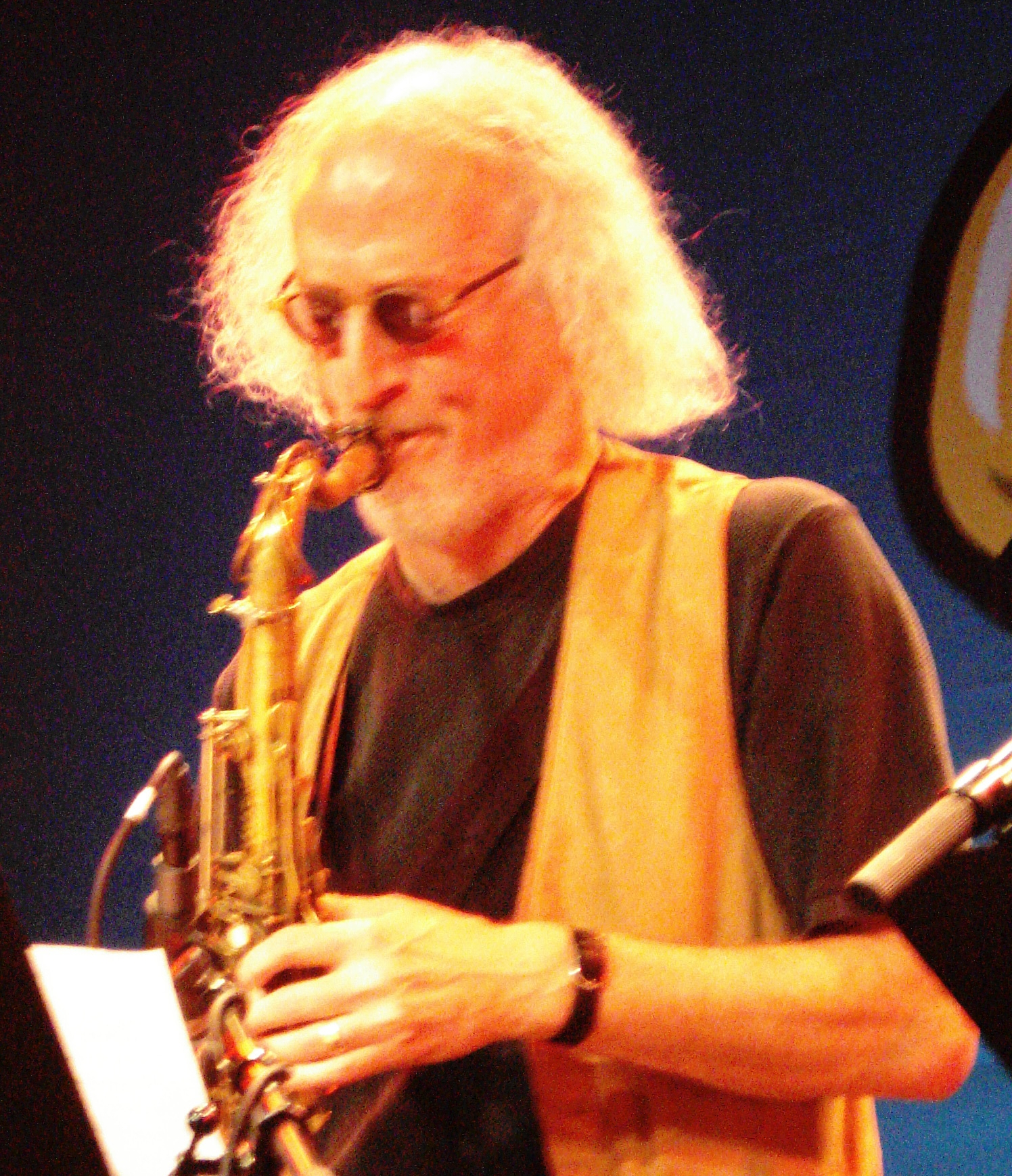
- Larry Ochs at Jazzfestival Saalfelden in 2009

Background information
- Born: May 3, 1949 (age 75); New York City
- Genres: Jazz, avant-garde jazz, classical
- Occupation(s): Musician, composer, producer, label owner
- Instrument: Saxophone
- Labels: Music & Arts, Metalanguage, Black Saint, Atavistic, RogueArt, Not Two, Intakt

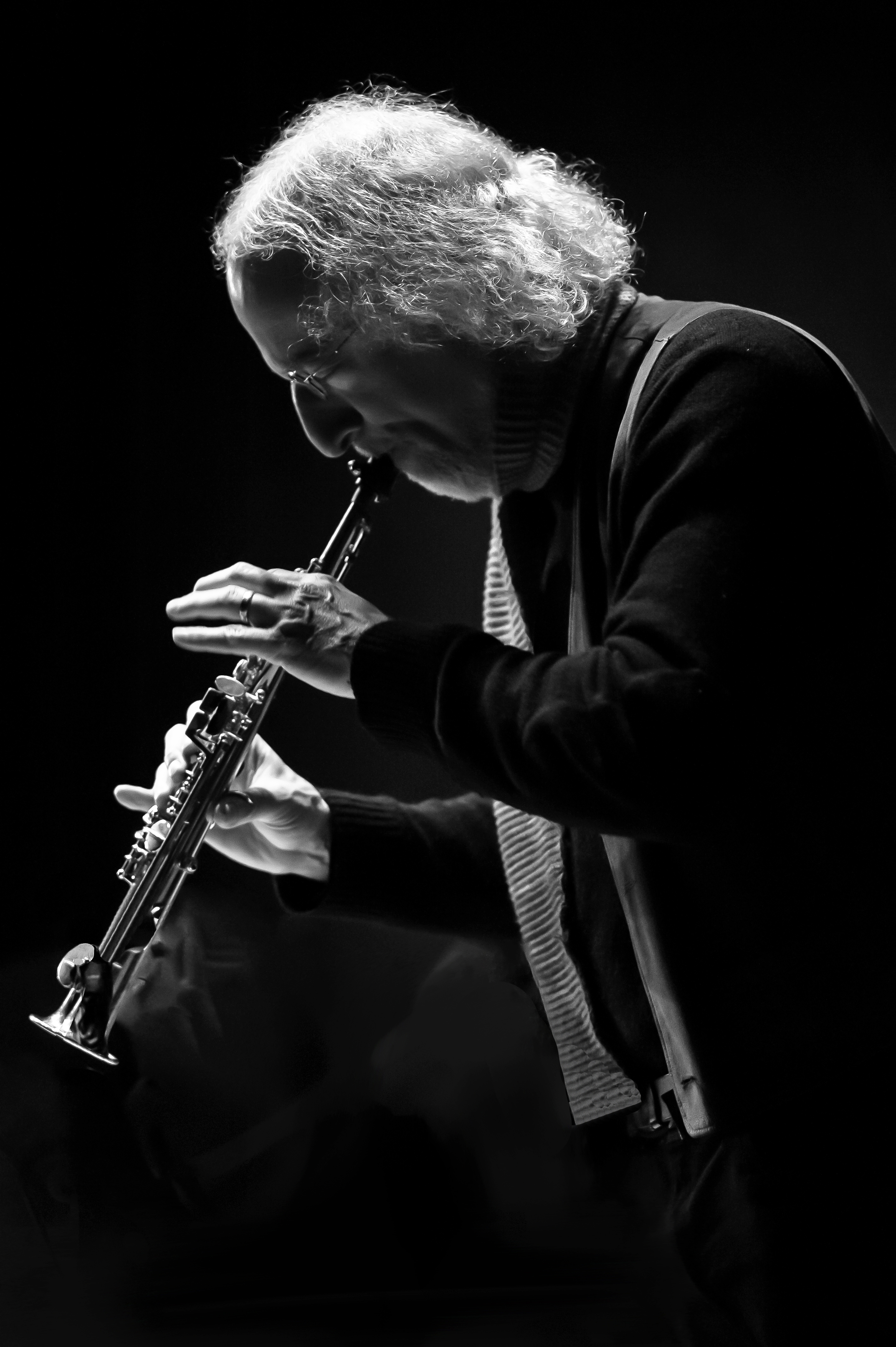
Larry Ochs, Buffalo, New York,

Larry Ochs (born May 3, 1949 in New York City) is an American jazz saxophonist, co-founder of the Rova Saxophone Quartet and Metalanguage Records.

Ochs studied trumpet briefly but concentrated on tenor and sopranino saxophones. He worked as a record producer and founded his own label, Metalanguage Records in 1978, in addition to operating the Twelve Stars studio in California. He co-founded the Rova Saxophone Quartet and worked in Glenn Spearman's Double Trio. A frequent recipient of commissions, he composed the music for the play Goya's L.A. by Leslie Scalapino in 1994 and for the film Letters Not About Love, which was named best documentary at SXSW in 1998. He has played in a new music trio called Room and the What We Live ensemble. He has recorded several albums as a leader. He formed the group Kihnoua in 2007 with vocalist Dohee Lee and Scott Amendola on drums and electronics, which released Unauthorized Caprices in 2010.

He was married to poet Lyn Hejinian until her death in 2024.

== Discography ==
- Hall of Mirrors, Room (Music & Arts, 1992)
- The Secret Magritte (Black Saint, 1995)
- The Neon Truth (Black Saint, 2002)
- Fly Fly Fly (Intakt, 2004) with Joan Jeanrenaud, Miya Masaoka
- Out Trios Vol.5: Up from Under (Atavistic, 2007)
- The Mirror World (Metalanguage, 2007)
- Spiller Alley (RogueArt, 2008)
- Stone Shift (RogueArt, 2009)
- We All Feel the Same Way, Jones Jones (SoLyd, 2009)
- Unauthorized Caprices (Not Two, 2010)
- The Throne (Not Two, 2014) with Don Robinson
- The Fictive Five (Tzadik, 2015)

With Rova Saxophone Quartet

- 1978 The Bay
- 1978 Cinema Rovaté
- 1979 Daredevils
- 1979 The Removal of Secrecy
- 1979 This, This, This, This
- 1981 As Was
- 1984 Plays Lacy-Favorite Street
- 1985 The Crowd-For Elias Canetti
- 1987 Beat Kennel
- 1989 Electric Rags II
- 1991 Long on Logic
- 1989 This Time We Are Both
- 1992 From the Bureau of Both
- 1994 Terry Riley: Chanting the Light of Foresight
- 1995 John Coltrane's Ascension
- 1995 The Works Vol. 1
- 1996 Ptow!!
- 1996 The Works Vol. 2
- 1996 Totally Spinning
- 1998 Morphological Echo
- 1998 Bingo
- 1999 The Works Vol. 3
- 2003 Resistance
- 2005 Electric Ascension
- 2007 The Juke Box Suite
- 2012 A Short History

With Glenn Spearman

- 1992 Mystery Project
- 1993 Smokehouse
- 1996 The Fields
- 1997 Blues for Falasha

With Fred Frith and Maybe Monday

- Digital Wildlife (Winter & Winter, 2002)
- Unsquare (Intakt, 2008)

With Dave Rempis and Darren Johnston

- Spectral (Aerophonic, 2014)
