= Steph Richards =

Trumpeter and composer

Stephanie "Steph" Richards (born May 2, 1982) is a Canadian-American composer, trumpeter, bandleader and producer known for her contributions to the contemporary jazz and experimental music scenes. Her multidisciplinary approaches to composition, including her Supersense project for scent and music with Jason Moran, Kenny Wollesen and Stomu Takeishi, have earned critical acclaim. In 2014 Richards was appointed to the music faculty at the University of California, San Diego.

== Early life and education ==
Richards was born in Grande Prairie, Alberta, Canada, and grew up in Calgary, Alberta. She studied music at the Interlochen Arts Academy (Interlochen, MI), the Eastman School of Music (BMus. and Performance Certificate Honors), McGill University (MMus.), California Institute of the Arts (CalArts) (MFA).

== Career ==
Upon moving to New York City in 2008, Richards recorded and performed with notable pioneers of the avant-garde, ranging from composers Henry Threadgill, Anthony Braxton, Lawrence D. "Butch" Morris and John Zorn to art-pop oriented artists Laurie Anderson, Yoko Ono, David Byrne and St. Vincent and contemporary composers John Luther Adams, Helmut Lachenmann, Nico Muhly and Louis Andriessen.

As an ensemble collaborator Richards is founding member of Bang on A Can's Asphalt Orchestra and has also worked with the International Contemporary Ensemble (ICE), Anthony Braxton's Tricentric Orchestra, Henry Threadgill's Kestra and alongside the Kronos Quartet. As an improviser she has worked with Ravi Coltrane, Jason Moran, Nicole Mitchell, Mark Dresser, Anthony Davis, Vijay Iyer, Tyshawn Sorey, Mary Halvorson, Ingrid Laubrock, Tom Rainey, Gerald Cleaver, Stomu Takeishi, JT Lewis, Tomeka Reid, Kenny Wolleson, Wayne Horvitz, John Hebert, Oscar Noriega, Liberty Ellman and Sylvie Courvoisier. Richards' work as a composer includes interdisciplinary elements including choreography, film, scents and site specific works. As a conductor, she has worked with orchestras in Mexico, Europe and the US employing the musical language of "Conduction," which she gained under the mentorship of the late Butch Morris and J.A. Dino Deane.

The New York Times calls Richards "an emerging maestro of extended technique" and "boldly inventive." Downbeat says that Richards has proven herself "a virtuoso of nonlinear trumpet playing."

== Selected discography ==
=== As leader ===
- Power Vibe (Northern Spy, 2024)
- Wind Layers (track 9: "Thyroid") (7k!, 2022)
- Zephyr (Relative Pitch, 2021)
- Supersense (Northern Spy, 2020)
- Take the Neon Lights, (Birdwatcher, 2019)
- FULLMOON, as Stephanie Richards (Relative Pitch, 2018)

=== As collaborator / side-artist ===
- Pauline Oliveros, James IIlgenfritz, Altamirage (Infrequent Seams, 2022)
- Anthony Braxton, 12 Comp Zim, (Firehouse 12, 2022)
- James Carney, PureHeart, (Sunnyside Records, 2020 (with Ravi Coltrane, Oscar Noriega, Tom Rainey, Dezron Douglas)
- Robert Erickson, Duo, Fives, Quintet, Trio (New World Records, 2019)
- Andrew Munsey, High Tide (Birdwatcher Records, 2019)
- Henry Threadgill, Dirt....and more Dirt, 14 or 15 Kestra: Agg (Pi Recordings, 2018)
- Vinny Golia, Bert Teretzky, Trio Music (pfMentum Records, 2018)
- Resonant Bodies (feat. Andrew Drury), Thaw (Different Track, 2018)
- Listen Space, Volumes I-IV (Frog Peak Peak Music, 2019)
- Deerhoof featuring Cover Band (Joyful Noise Records, 2017)
- John Zorn, There is No More Firmament (Tzadik Records, 2017)
- Anthony Braxton, TRILLIUM J: THE NON-UNCONFESSIONABLES - COMPOSITION NO. 380, (New Braxton House Records, 2016)
- Manfred Werder, 2003 (Wandelweiser Records, 2016)
- John Luther Adams, SILA, (New Yorker Presents, 2016)
- Taylor Ho Bynum, Enter The Plustet (Firehouse 12, 2016)
- Joseph C. Phillips Jr. and Numinous, Changing Same (New Amsterdam Records, 2015)
- Anthony Braxton, Composition No. 46 (+168 and Language Music), (New Braxton House Records, 2014)
- Asphalt Orchestra, Surfer Rosa (Cantaloupe Records, 2014)
- Qasim Naqvi, Progressive Youth Club (self-release, 2012)
- Patrick Bower, Pink Room, (self-release, 2012)
- Mike Kelly, The Judson Church Horse Dance (ArtPix Studios, 2011)
- Asphalt Orchestra, Asphalt Orchestra, (Cantaloupe Music, 2010)
- Ensemble Inauthentica, Music from Stanford: 541, Vol.3 (Innova Recordings, 2008)

=== Video Collaborations ===
- Zephyr and Anza (directed by Vipal Monga, Dakoit, 2021)
- Underbelly (directed by Cossa, Pomp & Clout, 2020)
- Brooklyn Machine (directed by Andrea Yasko, SwampCat, 2019)
- Gong (directed by Aaron Vinton, Pomp & Clout, 2018)
- Flow State (directed by Kyle Johnson, Exceptionally Decent. 2018)

=== Awards and recognition ===
Richards is a Yamaha artist.
