= Kyoko Kitamura =

Japanese musician

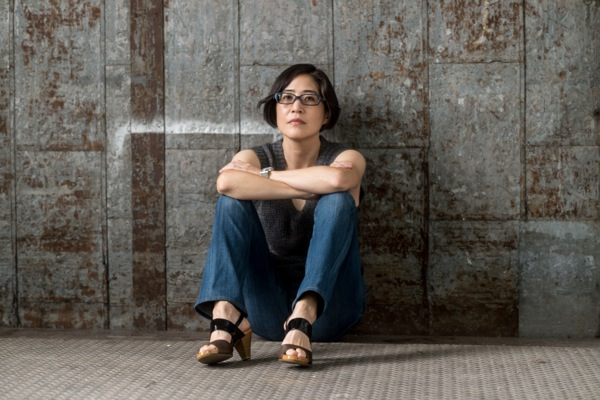

Kyoko Kitamura is a vocal improviser and composer residing in New York City.

== Background ==
Kitamura is a Japanese-American musician born in New York City and raised partially in Tokyo. She studied piano at the Juilliard School of Music pre-college division but later chose to become a TV reporter with Fuji Television, a national network in Japan and was based in Paris for many years as their French news correspondent.

After quitting her job, she moved back to NYC in 1997, worked as a freelance magazine writer for a few years before getting back into music after a hiatus of close to 15 years. Unusual for a vocalist, she honed craft as a sideperson-vocalist with NYC musicians such as bassists Reggie Workman and William Parker, saxophonist Steve Coleman, cornet player Taylor Ho Bynum, among others.

Since 2010, she has been working with saxophonist and composer Anthony Braxton as one of his vocalists and as the director of communication for his organization, the Tri-Centric Foundation. Mostly recently, she appears on these Anthony Braxton albums: Trillium J, 12 Duets (DCWM) 2012, Trillium E, and his Syntactical Ghost Trance Choir live performance release (all from New Braxton House Records). In 2023, she created the mini-documentary Introduction to Syntactical Ghost Trance Music, which DownBeat Magazine calls “an invaluable resource for Braxton-philes.”

== Discography ==
In 2018, she released her second leader album Protean Labyrinth (self-release on Bandcamp, 2018) featuring Ingrid Laubrock, Ken Filiano and Dayeon Seok. She is also the co-leader of a series of albums, released by Relative Pitch Records, on which she collaborated with cellist Tomeka Reid, trumpeter Taylor Ho Bynum, and guitarist Joe Morris: Geometry of Caves (2016 [2018]), Geometry of Distance (2018 [2019]) and Geometry of Trees (2021 [2022]). Her discography as a sideperson includes Anthony Braxton's Trillium J (New Braxton House 2016),Trillium E (New Braxton House 2011) and 12 Duets (DCWM) 2012 (New Braxton House 2014), William Parker's Migration of Silence Into and Out of The Tone World, Cory Smythe's Accelerate Every Voice and Taylor Ho Bynum's Madeleine Dreams (Firehouse 12 Records 2009) among others.

== Have performed and/or recorded with ==
Laura Andel Orchestra, Matthew Barney, Anthony Braxton, Taylor Ho Bynum, Steve Coleman, Yayoi Ikawa, Mark Lamb, Art Lande, Russ Lossing, William Parker, Jim Staley, Reggie Workman, and others.
