= Celebrating Fred Anderson =

Live album by Roscoe Mitchell
- Released: 2015
- Recorded: March 27, 2015
- Venue: Constellation, Chicago
- Genre: Jazz
- Length: 70:05
- Label: Nessa
- Producer: Chuck Nessa

Roscoe Mitchell chronology
| Angel City (2014) | Celebrating Fred Anderson (2015) | Four Ways (2017) |

Celebrating Fred Anderson is an album by American jazz saxophonist Roscoe Mitchell, which was recorded live in 2015 at Chicago's Constellation and released on Nessa. For this tribute to saxophonist Fred Anderson, Mitchell assembled a quartet with cellist Tomeka Reid, bassist Junius Paul and drummer Vincent Davis and prepared four original pieces and adaptations of two Fred Anderson compositions, "Bernice" and "Ladies in Love".

== Reception ==
Professional ratings
Review scores
| Source | Rating |
|---|---|
| Down Beat | 4/5 stars |

The Down Beat review by Peter Margasak says "Reedist, composer and bandleader Roscoe Mitchell has always trusted in his own vision. He takes the AACM's emphasis on creating new, original music as immutable gospel, and it is a major sign of respect that Mitchell has paid homage to the great Chicago tenor saxophonist Fred Anderson on this bracing new effort."

Derek Taylor of Dusted Magazine wrote: "Recorded five days after what would have been the Chicago saxophonist's 85th birthday, Celebrating Fred Anderson accomplishes exactly that through a program of challenging concert music that parallels the spirit if not letter of its dedicatee... Anderson would no doubt be honored by his old friend's observance and the continued tenacity of his creative endeavors."

In a review for Point of Departure, Michael Rosenstein stated: "Rather than convene one of Anderson's working groups or bringing one of his ensembles, it was great that Mitchell assembled a cross-generational group of members of the AACM... The set... offers up an apt tribute to a musician who was a stalwart individualist throughout his career."

Jazz Word's Ken Waxman commented: "Confirmed is the abiding power of, plus the continued sonic research involved in creating, the sounds that Anderson and Mitchell helped nurture."

Clifford Allen, writing for The New York City Jazz Record, noted that "Mitchell's music may appear to be a methodical extension of Coltrane's scalar improvisations and while playing different instruments... and with the elder Anderson drawing from the bebop of Gene Ammons and Charlie Parker, their similarities are more than apparent." He summed up his opinion of the album by stating "The title is absolutely true and then some."

== Track listing ==
All compositions by Roscoe Mitchell except as indicated

1. "Song for Fred Anderson" – 17:24
2. "Bernice" (Fred Anderson) – 10:40
3. "The Velvet Lounge" – 6:43
4. "Hey Fred" – 17:05
5. "Ladies in Love" (Fred Anderson) – 13:46
6. "Cermak Road" – 4:27

== Personnel ==
- Roscoe Mitchell - alto sax, soprano sax, sopranino sax
- Tomeka Reid – cello
- Junius Paul – bass
- Vincent Davis – drums
