= Geometry of Distance =

Studio album by Tomeka Reid, Kyoko Kitamura, Taylor Ho Bynum, and Joe Morris
- Released: 2019
- Recorded: December 19, 2018
- Studio: Firehouse 12 Studios, New Haven, Connecticut
- Genre: Free improvisation
- Label: Relative Pitch; RPR1096

Tomeka Reid chronology
Old New (2019)	Geometry of Distance (2019)	Of Things Beyond Thule Vol. 1 (2020)

Geometry of Distance is an album by cellist Tomeka Reid, vocalist Kyoko Kitamura, cornetist and trumpeter Taylor Ho Bynum, and guitarist Joe Morris. It was recorded on December 19, 2018, at Firehouse 12 Studios in New Haven, Connecticut, and was released in 2019 by Relative Pitch Records.

Geometry of Distance was the second in a series of albums by the quartet. It was preceded by Geometry of Caves (2016 [2018]), and was followed by Geometry of Trees (2021 [2022]).

== Reception ==
Professional ratings
Review scores
Source	Rating
DownBeat	3.5/5 stars
Jazz Trail	B
Tom Hull – on the Web	B+

Writing for DownBeat, Aaron Cohen noted: "Every performer in Geometry has spent time receiving guidance from Anthony Braxton and, reflecting his approach, a subtle sense of exuberance underlies the quartet on its sophomore outing."

In a review for The New York City Jazz Record, Franz Matzner wrote: "This is music that submerges listeners rather than overpowers them... No one is bound to the traditional limits of their instruments, none are restricted by the dictates of time, harmony or conventional melody. The result is music that flows with subtle beauty and seems to penetrate the subconscious to linger there."

Author and critic Phil Freeman stated: "As might be expected from that lineup, it's highly abstract improvised music, rough going for all but the most committed listeners... There's no conventional song form present in their work, but each piece has consistency of mood, so there's logic, if you listen carefully and let it explain itself to you."

Bruce Lee Gallanter of the Downtown Music Gallery commented: "Since there is no percussionist or bassist involved, all four members are free to add their own percussive sounds. The music here is often quiet with a calm center... The restrained vibe makes this easier to deal with, no extreme outbursts, so patience is required to appreciate the subtly and nuance... If you give this disc some of your time, you will be blown away."

Jazz Trail's Filipe Freitas remarked: "The intricate synthesis of sound on this record is utterly experimental, expanding and contracting without previous warning. Cellist Tomeka Reid and guitarist Joe Morris work diligently on the quirky foundations, weaving atypical contrapuntal grids. In turn, idiosyncratic Japanese vocalist Kyoko Kitamura and American cornetist Taylor Ho Bynum contribute well-adjusted lines, sometimes freely, sometimes embedding their sounds in the surroundings."

Writer Raul Da Gama noted: "The word 'geometry' in the title suggests (and ends up) providing a kind of ghostly structure to what might otherwise map an amorphous musical journey. However, more than anything else the mathematical metaphor continues to evoke natural forces that, on this recording, shape human endeavour within an infinite cosmos."

Gregg Miller of The Free Jazz Collective included the album in his 2019 "Top 10" list, stating: "Sincere, collective improvisation. Musicality, virtuosity, and fearlessness."

A writer for Avant Music News commented: "Without any solid structure and including generous use of extended techniques, the album is subtle in approach. Listen in a quiet room, as this is not something that you will fully appreciate when subjected to background noise... the album is an adventure – one that keeps the listener on edge with evolving meta-patterns and systems. It is a piece of abstract performance art dutifully transcribed to the digital medium. Highly recommended."

== Track listing ==
1. "Space Chat" – 6:38
2. "The Erstwhile" – 4:36
3. "Veil of Imagination" – 10:06
4. "The Zoo Hypothesis" – 4:22
5. "Sun Grazing" – 10:42
6. "Magnificent Desolation" – 2:24
7. "Bravery's Consequence" – 16:30

== Personnel ==
- Tomeka Reid – cello
- Kyoko Kitamura – vocals
- Taylor Ho Bynum – cornet, piccolo trumpet, bass trumpet
- Joe Morris – guitar
