= Geometry of Caves =

Studio album by Tomeka Reid, Kyoko Kitamura, Taylor Ho Bynum, and Joe Morris
- Released: 2018
- Recorded: December 22, 2016
- Studio: Firehouse 12 Studios, New Haven, Connecticut
- Genre: Free improvisation
- Label: Relative Pitch; RPR1068

Tomeka Reid chronology
Signaling (2017)	Geometry of Caves (2018)	Ithra (2018)

Geometry of Caves is an album by cellist Tomeka Reid, vocalist Kyoko Kitamura, cornetist and trumpeter Taylor Ho Bynum, and guitarist Joe Morris. It was recorded on December 22, 2016, at Firehouse 12 Studios in New Haven, Connecticut, and was released in 2018 by Relative Pitch Records.

Geometry of Caves was the first in a series of albums by the quartet, and was followed by Geometry of Distance (2018 [2019]) and Geometry of Trees (2021 [2022]).

== Reception ==
Professional ratings
Review scores
Source	Rating
All About Jazz	4/5 stars
Jazzwise	3/5 stars

In a review for All About Jazz, Troy Dostert called the album "bewitching," noting the players' "meticulously-developed improvisations." He wrote: "The recording quality of the album is first-rate, with clear separation between the musicians, something that's especially welcome on a release in which dialogic interaction is so crucial.... There's a lot of energy and excitement on the record, but it's usually carefully contained."

Kevin Le Gendre of Jazzwise stated: "there is a richness and attention to detail in the sound palette and interaction of the players that often suggests a larger group, or possibly one with more technological resources at its disposal. At the heart of the work is a delicious question mark over whether some of the timbres are electric or acoustic."

The New York City Jazz Record's John Sharpe commented: "Wonderfully gritty but exuberant interchange is the name of the game... Each participant shows that fine balance between listening and doing your own thing distinguishing the most satisfying improvisations...the absence of prolonged solo forays signals that this was conceived very much as a group endeavor."

Writing for Dusted Magazine, Derek Taylor remarked: "Searching for leadership in a singular sense on Geometry of Caves immediately becomes an exercise in needless futility. The foursome behind the fifty-minutes of freely improvised music is resolute in its acceptance of communal responsibility and creation... No quarter given to listeners on the lookout for language beholden to melody, harmony and rhythm, this is still very much music and the work of four aces in the demanding craft of collective, instinctual improvisation."

In an article for Stereogum, Phil Freeman wrote: "This is hardcore improvised music... There is no conventional song form present, but each piece has consistency of mood, so there is logic here, if you listen carefully and let it explain itself to you."

The Downtown Music Gallery's Bruce Lee Gallanter noted: "The exchange between all four members of this quartet moves from fast and furious to slightly more moderate tempo interaction to some more restrained moments... everything seems to fit together no matter where they go. Nobody here dominates, this is a true group effort... There is something most enchanting about this disc and feels like those special spirits which inspire us and often make us smile."

Writer Raul Da Gama described the music as "powerful," and commented: "while the title suggests a kind of dry, scientific spelunking, individual songs go far beyond that and it would almost appear that conceptually and musically the 'cave' might even be seen as a metaphor for a subterranean safe haven for humankind."

== Track listing ==
1. "Prelude to a Crazy Year" – 8:29
2. "It is Deeper Than is Wide" – 8:55
3. "Cloud Latters" – 3:17
4. "Glowworm (Fungus Gnat)" – 4:38
5. "Then This Happened" – 8:17
6. "The First Encounter" – 5:40
7. "Stalactites Chapel" – 11:20

== Personnel ==
- Tomeka Reid – cello
- Kyoko Kitamura – vocals
- Taylor Ho Bynum – cornet, piccolo trumpet, bass trumpet
- Joe Morris – guitar
