= Taylor Ho Bynum =

American musician

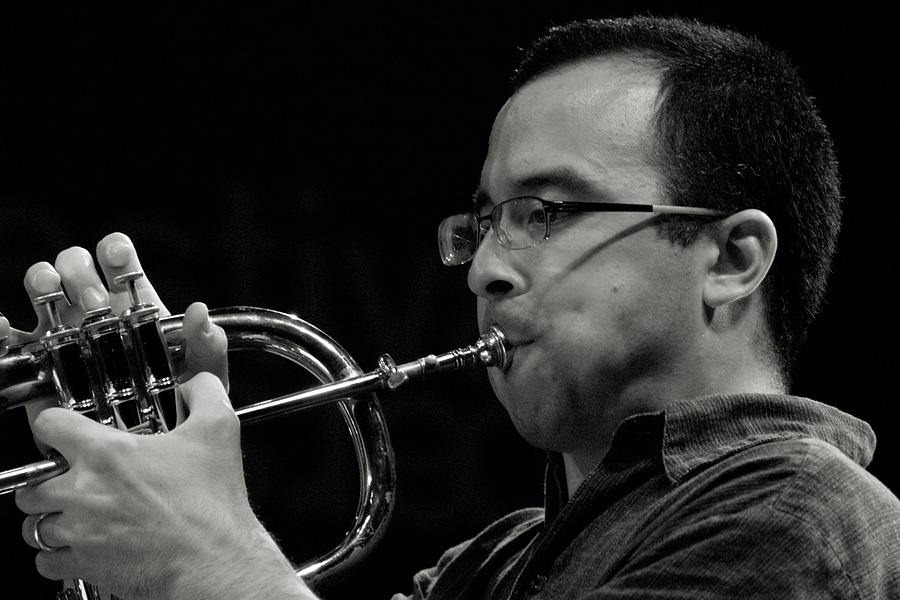
- At the Moers Festival, 2007

Background information
- Born: 1975 (age 49–50); Baltimore, Maryland, U.S.
- Occupation(s): Musician, composer, educator, writer
- Instrument(s): Cornet, flugelhorn, trumpet, similar instruments
- Years active: 1990s–present
- Website: taylorhobynum.com

Taylor Ho Bynum (born 1975) is a musician, composer, educator and writer. His main instrument is the cornet, but he also plays numerous similar instruments, including flugelhorn and trumpet.

== Early life ==
Bynum was born in Baltimore in 1975, and grew up in Boston. His parents were fans of music, and professional musicians were often in the family home. Bynum's sister is writer Sarah Shun-lien Bynum.

Bynum began playing the trumpet at the age of ten, and played classical music in youth orchestras when at high school. At the age of 15, funding for music was cut at his school, so he joined the jazz big band at a local university instead; there, he was mentored by bass trombonist and tubaist Bill Lowe. Working in an ice cream shop meant that Bynum was able to organize weekly jazz concerts there. Around the early 1990s, Bynum first played with drummer Tomas Fujiwara. Continuing his interest in music, Bynum attended Wesleyan University, where he studied with a major influence on his future – Anthony Braxton – as well as with Pheeroan akLaff, Jay Hoggard, and others. Bynum graduated from Wesleyan in 1998.

== Later life and career ==
In 1999, he played on two Braxton albums and a duo album with Eric Rosenthal. In addition to Lowe and Braxton, Bill Dixon was a formative influence on Bynum. His recording continued in 2001: on Trio Ex Nihilo with Curt Newton and Jeff Song, and with the Sound Visions Orchestra of Alan Silva. A year later, he recorded duets with Braxton and Rosenthal, as well as playing on the Fully Celebrated Orchestra's Marriage of Heaven and Earth, and creating a band with himself as cornetist, plus an electric guitar and string quartet, together named SpiderMonkey Strings. He also began a master's degree in music composition at Wesleyan. His sextet released its first album, The Middle Picture, in 2007, and Asphalt Flowers Forking Paths two years later. Bynum was also a member of Jason Kao Hwang's quartet named Edge. From 2007, Bynum has been part of The Convergence Quartet, with pianist Alexander Hawkins, bassist Dominic Lash, and drummer Harris Eisenstadt; they released their fourth album, Owl Jacket, in 2016. In 2007, Bynum co-founded the record label Firehouse 12, with engineer Nick Lloyd. The label's first release was Braxton's 9 Compositions (consisting of nine CDs and one DVD), and Bynum's The Middle Picture was next.

In September 2010, Bynum toured New England, traveling between gigs on a bicycle. In the same year, he recorded the quartet Searching for Adam. This was followed by Apparent Distance in 2011 and Navigation by his 7-Tette two years later. The former was a four-part suite, funded by Chamber Music America's 2010 New Jazz Works. The Throes was also from 2011, and was co-led by Nate Wooley, with whom Bynum had played for two years. Bynum released Navigation around 2013; it consisted of four performances of a single piece, with two being released on LP and two on CD (all four were released for digital download, which was also available to purchasers of either physical release). Bynum expounded on his releasing four recordings of the same piece: "I want to ask listeners to consider the composition as a set of possibilities rather than a fixed document, to encourage them to enjoy the mutable nature of the music in multiple realizations rather than focusing on one particular performance." In 2014, he undertook another "Acoustic Bicycle Tour" from Vancouver, Canada down the West Coast to Tijuana, Mexico, captured in a short documentary film by Chris Jonas. Book of Three was a trio album in 2014, and Enter the PlusTet two years later was performed by a 15-piece band. A new quartet, Illegal Crowns, was recorded in 2014.

In the area of education, Bynum has led jazz ensembles at Northeastern University, and has been the director of the Coast Jazz Orchestra at Dartmouth College since July 2017. He has also written about music for The New Yorker magazine. He has also served as the executive director of Anthony Braxton's Tri-Centric Foundation since 2010, producing and performing on most of Braxton's recent major projects, including his Trillium operas and his Sonic Genomes. A further activity has been organizing music events, including the Sound Genome project in Vancouver in 2010 and a festival at the Roulette club in New York City the following year.

== Composition and playing styles ==
A reviewer of Next commented that Bynum "deploys a litany of buzzes, whistles, drones, pinched fanfares and garrulous brass muttering in acrobatic arcs that twist and somersault." The overlaps of composition and improvisation are explored by Bynum; a reviewer of Illegal Crowns and Enter the PlusTet observed that they "are equally imaginative and revolutionary in their own right, characterized by a dogged exploration of the ebb and flow between composition and spontaneity."

== Awards ==
Bynum was Down Beat magazine's Rising Star Trumpeter in its critics poll of 2017.

== Discography ==
An asterisk (*) indicates that the year is that of release.

=== As leader/co-leader ===
Year recorded	Title	Label	Notes
2018	Geometry of Distance	Relative Pitch	Quartet, with Tomeka Reid (cello), Kyoko Kitamura (voice), and Joe Morris (guitar)
2018	The Ambiguity Manifesto	Firehouse 12	9-piece band, with Bill Lowe (bass trombone, tuba), Ingrid Laubrock (soprano sax, tenor sax), Jim Hobbs (alto sax), Ken Filiano (acoustic bass, electronics), Mary Halvorson (electric guitar), Stomu Takeishi (electric bass guitar), Tomas Fujiwara (drums), Tomeka Reid (cello)
2016	Geometry of Caves	Relative Pitch	Quartet, with Tomeka Reid (cello), Kyoko Kitamura (voice), and Joe Morris (guitar)
2016*	Enter the PlusTet	Firehouse 12	15-piece band, with Stephanie Richards and Nate Wooley (trumpet), Vincent Chancey (French horn), Steve Swell (trombone), Bill Lowe (bass trombone, tuba), Jim Hobbs (alto sax), Ingrid Laubrock (soprano sax, tenor sax), Matt Bauder (tenor sax, baritone sax), Jason Kao Hwang (violin), Tomeka Reid (cello), Jay Hoggard (vibraphone), Mary Halvorson (guitar), Ken Filiano (bass), Tomas Fujiwara (drums)
2015*	Owl Jacket	NoBusiness	As The Convergence Quartet. With Alexander Hawkins (piano), Dominic Lash (bass), Harris Eisenstadt (drums)
2014	Illegal Crowns	RogueArt	As Illegal Crowns. Quartet, with Benoît Delbecq (piano), Mary Halvorson (guitar), Tomas Fujiwara (drums)
2014*	Through Foundation	[Self-released]	Duo, with Tomas Fujiwara (drums)
2013*	Continuum (2012)	Relative Pitch	As Book of Three. Trio, with John Hébert (bass), Gerald Cleaver (drums)
2012	Navigation	Firehouse 12	Two albums are sextet, with Jim Hobbs (alto sax), Bill Lowe (bass trombone, tuba), Mary Halvorson (guitar), Ken Filiano (bass), Tomas Fujiwara (drums); in concert. Two albums are septet, with Chad Taylor (vibraphone, drums) added
2012*	Dibrujo, Dibrujo, Dibrujo...	Cuneiform	As Positive Catastrophe. 10-piece band, with Abraham Gomez-Delgado (percussion, vocals), Kamala Sankaram (accordion, vocals), Mark Taylor (French horn), Reut Regev (trombone), Matt Bauder (tenor sax), Michael Attias (baritone sax), Pete Fitzpatrick (guitar, vocals), Alvaro Benavides (bass), Tomas Fujiwara (drums)
2011	Slow and Steady	NoBusiness	As The Convergence Quartet. With Alexander Hawkins (piano), Dominic Lash (bass), Harris Eisenstadt (drums); in concert
2011*	Apparent Distance	Firehouse 12	Sextet, with Jim Hobbs (alto sax), Bill Lowe (bass trombone, tuba), Mary Halvorson (guitar), Ken Filiano (bass), Tomas Fujiwara (drums)
2010	Station Direct	Important	As The Thirteenth Assembly. Quartet, with Jessica Pavone (viola), Mary Halvorson (guitar), Tomas Fujiwara (drums)
2011*	Next	Porter	Trio, with Joe Morris (guitar), Sara Schoenbeck (bassoon)
2011*	The Throes	CIMP	Quartet, with Nate Wooley, Ken Filiano (bass), Tomas Fujiwara (drums)
2010	Duo (Amherst) 2010	New Braxton House	Duo, with Anthony Braxton (baritone sax, alto sax, soprano sax, sopranino sax); DVD; in concert
2009–10	Book of Three	RogueArt	As Book of Three. Trio, with John Hébert (bass), Gerald Cleaver (drums)
2010*	Stepwise	NotTwo	Duo, with Tomas Fujiwara (drums)
2010*	Song/Dance	Clean Feed	As The Convergence Quartet. With Alexander Hawkins (piano), Dominic Lash (bass), Harris Eisenstadt (drums)
2009*	Madeleine Dreams	Firehouse 12	With SpiderMonkey Strings: Kyoko Kitamura (voice), Jason Kao Hwang (violin), Jessica Pavone (viola), Tomas Ulrich (cello), Pete Fitzpatrick (guitar), Joseph Daley (tuba), Luther Gray (drums)
2009*	Garabatos Volume One	Cuneiform	As Positive Catastrophe. 10-piece band, with Abraham Gomez-Delgado (vocals, percussion), Jen Shyu (vocals, erhu), Michael Attias (baritone sax), Matt Bauder (tenor sax, clarinets), Reut Regev (trombone), Mark Taylor (French horn), Pete Fitzpatrick (guitar), Alvaro Benavides (bass), Tomas Fujiwara (drums)
2009*	The OtherTet	Engine	Quartet, with Bill Lowe (bass trombone, tuba), Joe Morris (bass), Kwaku Kwaakye Obeng (drums, percussion)
2008	Asphalt Flowers Forking Paths	hatOLOGY	Two tracks solo cornet; two tracks trio, with Mary Halvorson (guitar), Tomas Fujiwara (drums) added; three tracks sextet, with Matt Bauder (tenor sax, bass clarinet), Jessica Pavone (viola), Evan O'Reilly (guitar) added
2008*	The Double Trio	Engine	Trio, with Mary Halvorson (guitar), Tomas Fujiwara (drums); played with another trio: Stephen Haynes (trumpet), Allan Jaffe (guitar), Warren Smith (drums); in concert
2007	(un)sentimental	Important	As The Thirteenth Assembly. Quartet, with Jessica Pavone (viola), Mary Halvorson (guitar), Tomas Fujiwara (drums)
2007*	True Events	482 Music	Duo, with Tomas Fujiwara (drums)
2006	Live in Oxford	FMR	As The Convergence Quartet. With Alexander Hawkins (piano), Dominic Lash (bass), Harris Eisenstadt (drums); in concert
2005–06	The Middle Picture	Firehouse 12	Sextet, with Matt Bauder (tenor sax, clarinet, bass clarinet), Mary Halvorson (guitar), Evan O'Reilly (guitar), Jessica Pavone (viola, bass), Tomas Fujiwara (drums); some tracks in concert
2003–05	Other Stories (Three Suites)	482 Music	With SpiderMonkey Strings: Jay Hoggard (vibraphone), Jason Kao Hwang and Jean Cook (violin), Tomas Ulrich and Okkyung Lee (cello), Pete Fitzpatrick (guitar), Joseph Daley (tuba), Luther Gray (drums)
2000–01	Cenote	Cadence	Duo, with Eric Rosenthal (percussion)
1998	And Only Life My Lush Lament	Sachimay	Duo, with Eric Rosenthal (percussion)
