= Ithra (album) =

Studio album by Dave Rempis, Tomeka Reid, and Joshua Abrams
- Released: 2018
- Recorded: December 18, 2017
- Studio: Elastic Arts, Chicago
- Genre: Free jazz
- Label: Aerophonic Records; AR019
- Producer: Dave Rempis

Dave Rempis chronology
Dodecahedron (2018)	Ithra (2018)	The Early Bird Gets (2019)

Tomeka Reid chronology
Geometry of Caves (2018)	Ithra (2018)	Antichamber Music (2019)

Ithra is an album by saxophonist Dave Rempis, cellist Tomeka Reid, and double bassist Joshua Abrams. Consisting of eight improvised tracks, it was recorded on December 18, 2017, at Elastic Arts in Chicago, and was released in 2018 by Aerophonic Records.

== Reception ==
Professional ratings
Review scores
Source	Rating
Pitchfork	7.4/10 stars
Tom Hull – on the Web	B+

In a review for Pitchfork, Andy Beta wrote: "The gap between listening and reacting is so small so as to seem instantaneous... while Ithra isn't exactly playful, at times the musicians resemble children in a garden, focusing on one small aspect of the sound before drifting apart, making new discoveries, and then reconvening elsewhere. Pick virtually any point on the album and you'll find them wholly immersed in the beauty of the moment."

John Sharpe of The New York City Jazz Record called the pieces "collective inventions with oblique but still discernible ties to the jazz tradition," and noted: "It helps that Abrams is on board as it frees Reid to follow her own path without any notional responsibility to fill or hold down the bottom. In fact the trio thrives on the three-way interplay between the principals."

Stereogum's Phil Freeman stated: "This music could be improvised, it could be composed, or it could be some combination of the two; what matters is that it becomes three people speaking with one voice... They're listening to each other, they're leaving a lot of space and exploring the value of silence."

Writing for Dusted Magazine, Bill Meyer commented: "the real essence of [the trio's] bond is a shared commitment to improvising music that expresses a unique collective voice that is derived as much from what they don't do as what they do." Meyer included the album in his "Best of 2018: Jazz/Improv" column for Magnet Magazine, as well as in his portion of The Wire's 2018 Rewind.

Fotis Nikolakopoulos of The Free Jazz Collective featured the album in his 2018 "Top 10" list, writing: "The warmness of their playing goes along with high energy and pathos."

== Track listing ==
1. "Lerna" – 3:19
2. "Many Labors" – 5:20
3. "Morphallaxis" – 11:29
4. "Wattle and Daub" – 5:44
5. "Sister Cities" – 4:09
6. "Sigu Tolo" – 5:46
7. "Chorissa" – 9:09

== Personnel ==
- Dave Rempis – alto saxophone, tenor saxophone
- Tomeka Reid – cello
- Joshua Abrams – double bass
