= Relative Pitch Records =

American independent record label

- Founded: 2011
- Founder: Kevin Reilly, Mike Panico
- Genre: free jazz; improvisation; experimental
- Location: New York City
- Official website: relativepitchrecords.bandcamp.com

Relative Pitch Records is an American independent record label specializing in free jazz and avant-garde jazz, free improvisation, and experimental music. Run by Kevin Reilly, Relative Pitch has been ranked among the top jazz record labels in The New York City Jazz Record and DownBeat year-end lists, and praised by publications and organizations including The Guardian, NPR Music, The Brooklyn Rail, and in Bandcamp Daily's label profile, "Relative Pitch is Built on Enthusiasm for Experimental Music".

== History ==
Co-founders Kevin Reilly and Mike Panico first met waiting in line at a show and later spent time together as volunteers at The Stone, an experimental music space then located in the East Village. They eventually decided to start a record label, and co-founded Relative Pitch in 2011.

Both Reilly and Panico attended a large number of avant-jazz performances, as noted by many of the label's artists. In a 2013 feature, Mary Halvorson asserted that “What Kevin and Mike share is an unrelenting dedication to and passion for music, which is evident from the sheer number of concerts they attend"; Nate Wooley said, "what makes [Relative Pitch] so special in my mind, is that the people that run the label are faces in the crowd of 90% of the shows you play in New York", and described the two as "missionary in their desire to get the music they think is transcendent out to people that don't have the chance or impetus to go to six or seven shows a week in Brooklyn". They traveled to see shows as well, and the label's roster includes both local and international artists; Reilly has said, "I like the idea that you could look at our catalogue and not know where the label is based".

In 2018, Panico's body was found in Flushing Bay; his death was ruled a suicide. A memorial concert was held at Brooklyn performing arts space Roulette, with performances by a number of artists on the Relative Pitch label. Reilly took over operations following Panico's death.

== Reception ==
The Guardian has described Relative Pitch as "a label whose roster is the perfect place to start if you're looking to take the pulse of the best jazz and improv players currently on the scene". NPR Music has called Relative Pitch "a small label that has made a big impact in avant-garde and free-improv circles", saying its roster "includes some of the most acclaimed artists in the style [of avant-garde jazz], like guitarists Mary Halvorson and Susan Alcorn; bassists Joëlle Léandre and Michael Bisio; and saxophonists Evan Parker, Vinny Golia and Matana Roberts". The publication also noted Matthew Shipp, Bill Frisell, Ingrid Laubrock, Tom Rainey, and Kirk Knuffke as among the "dozens of prominent artists who have released albums on the label".

Wooley invited cofounder Reilly to contribute to "The Listeners Issue" of the journal Sound American, describing him as "represent[ing] a model of listening: the critical audience member" who "approaches every concert and, as you will see, every recording with the rigor of an academic and the intensity of a man possessed".

== Notable releases ==
The annual NPR Music Jazz Critics Poll has included Mary Halvorson's Reverse Blue (2014), James Brandon Lewis's An UnRuly Manifesto (2019), and the Susan Alcorn Quintet's Pedernal (2020). Lewis's An UnRuly Manifesto was also included in year-end lists in JazzTimes, The New York City Jazz Record, and DownBeat; the New York Times counted Alcorn's Pedernal in their Best Jazz Albums of 2020.

Along with Lewis, many Relative Pitch releases have received a top rating in DownBeat: Continuum (2012) by Book of Three, the trio of Taylor Ho Bynum, John Hébert, and Gerald Cleaver; Greg Cohen's Golden State (2014); Evan Parker and Sylvie Courvoisier's Either Or And (2015); Courvoisier and Halvorson's Crop Circles (2017); and John Butcher's Last Dream Of The Morning (2018).

Other critically-acclaimed albums include Matthew Shipp and Michael Bisio's Floating Ice (2012); Jemeel Moondoc's The Zookeeper's House (2014); Tomas Fujiwara's Variable Bets (2014); the Matthew Shipp Trio's Root of Things (2014); Matana Roberts' Always (2015); Halvorson's Reverse Blue (2015); Alcorn's Soledad (2015); Pulverize The Sound, the self-titled debut of trio Peter Evans, Tim Dahl, and Mike Pride (2015); Mette Rasmussen and Chris Corsano's All The Ghosts At Once (2015); Bisio and Kirk Knuffke's Row for William O. (2016); The Out Louds, the eponymous debut of trio Halvorson, Fujiwara, and Ben Goldberg (2016); Steph Richards' Fullmoon (2018); Geometry of Caves (2018) and Geometry of Distance (2019), both by the improvisational quartet of Tomeka Reid, Kyoko Kitamura, Taylor Ho Bynum, and Joe Morris; and Gregg Belisle-Chi's ‘Koi’: Performing the Music of Tim Berne (2021). Relative Pitch also released Nate Wooley's quartet project with Laubrock, Matt Moran, and Courvoisier in the albums Battle Pieces (2015), Battle Pieces 2 (2017), and Battle Pieces 4 (2019).

== Discography ==
=== Relative Pitch Records (RPR) ===
Cat. Number	Artist	Title	Year
RPR1001	Joey Baron (with Bill Frisell)	Just Listen	2013
RPR1002	Joëlle Léandre & Phillip Greenlief	That Overt Desire Of Object	2011
RPR1003	Vinny Golia Quartet (with Cline, Bradford, Filiano)	Take Your Time	2011
RPR1004	Aych (Jim Hobbs, Mary Halvorson, Taylor Ho Bynum)	As The Crow Flies	2012
RPR1005	Michael Bisio & Matthew Shipp	Floating Ice	2012
RPR1006	Way Out Northwest (Dylan Van Der Schyff, John Butcher, Torsten Müller)	The White Spot	2012
RPR1007	Urs Leimgruber & Roger Turner	The Pancake Tour	2012
RPR1008	Joe Morris, Agustí Fernández, Nate Wooley	From The Discrete To The Particular	2012
RPR1009	Jemeel Moondoc & Connie Crothers	Two	2012
RPR1010	Joëlle Léandre & Jérôme Bourdellon	Evidence	2013
RPR1011	Chris Abrahams & Magda Mayas	Gardener	2013
RPR1012	Book Of Three (Taylor Ho Bynum, John Hébert, Gerald Cleaver)	Continuum	2013
RPR1013	Estamos Trio (Carmina Escobar, Milo Tamez, Thollem McDonas)	People's Historia	2013
RPR1014	Sifter (Mary Halvorson, Kirk Knuffke, Matt Wilson)	Sifter	2013
RPR1015	FPR (Frank Gratkowski, Phillip Greenlief, Jon Raskin)	All At Once	2013
RPR1016	Vinny Golia & Urs Leimgruber	Empiricism In The West	2013
RPR1017	Jack Wright & Ben Wright	As If Anything Could Be The Same	2014
RPR1018	Ingrid Laubrock & Tom Rainey	And Other Desert Towns	2014
RPR1019	Paul Flaherty & Randall Colbourne	Ironic Havoc	2014
RPR1020	Greg Cohen	Golden State	2014
RPR1021	Bogan Ghost (Anthea Caddy, Liz Allbee)	Zerfall	2014
RPR1022	Matthew Shipp Trio (with Michael Bisio, Whit Dickey)	Root of Things	2014
RPR1023	Stephen Gauci / Kirk Knuffke / Ken Filiano	Chasing Tales	2014
RPR1024	Evan Parker & Sylvie Courvoisier	Either Or And	2014
RPR1025	Mary Halvorson (with Opsvik, Fujiwara, Speed)	Reverse Blue	2014
RPR1026	Jemeel Moondoc (with Shipp, Campbell, Swell, Greene, Baker)	The Zookeeper's House	2014
RPR1027	Michel Doneda	Everybody Digs Michel Doneda	2014
RPR1028	Tomas Fujiwara Trio (with Brandon Seabrook, Ralph Alessi)	Variable Bets	2014
RPR1029	Joe Morris	Solos Bimhuis	2015
RPR1030	Birgit Ulher & Leonel Kaplan	Stereo Trumpet	2015
RPR1031	Nate Wooley	Battle Pieces	2015
RPR1032	Susan Alcorn	Soledad	2015
RPR1033	Dead Neanderthals (Otto Kokke, René Aquarius)	Worship The Sun	2015
RPR1034	Leila Bordreuil & Michael Foster	The Caustic Ballads	2016
RPR1035	Matthew Shipp Chamber Ensemble (with Michael Bisio, Mat Maneri)	The Gospel According to Matthew & Michael	2015
RPR1036	Matana Roberts	Always	2015
RPR1037	Mette Rasmussen & Chris Corsano	All The Ghosts At Once	2015
RPR1038	Jessica Pavone	Silent Spills	2016
RPR1039	Pulverize The Sound (Mike Pride, Peter Evans, Tim Dahl)	Pulverize The Sound	2015
RPR1040	Michael Bisio	Accortet	2015
RPR1041	Thollem / Wimberly / Cline	Radical Empathy	2015
RPR1042	Fujiwara / Goldberg / Halvorson	The Out Louds	2016
RPR1043	Michael Bisio & Kirk Knuffke	Row For William O.	2016
RPR1044	Corsano / Courvoisier / Wooley	Salt Task	2016
RPR1045	Sylvie Courvoisier & Mary Halvorson	Crop Circles	2016
RPR1046	Mazur / Neuringer	Diachronic Paths	2016
RPR1047	Jemeel Moondoc & Hilliard Greene	Cosmic Nickelodeon	2016
RPR1048	Ingrid Laubrock & Tom Rainey	Buoyancy	2016
RPR1049	Catherine Sikora	Jersey	2016
RPR1050	Joe Morris	Shock Axis	2016
RPR1051	Perch, Hen, Brock, Rain (Ab Baars, Ig Henneman, Ingrid Laubrock, Tom Rainey)	Live @ The Jazz Happening Tampere	2016
RPR1052	Forebrace (Alex Ward, Jem Doulton, Roberto Sassi, Santiago Horro)	Steeped	2016
RPR1053	Tristan Honsinger / Nicolas Caloia / Joshua Zubot	In The Sea	2017
RPR1054	Thollem & Mazurek	Blind Curves And Box Canyons	2017
RPR1055	JR3 (Jan Roder, Olaf Rupp, Rudi Mahall)	Happy Jazz	2017
RPR1056	John Butcher, John Edwards, Mark Sanders	Last Dream Of The Morning	2017
RPR1057	Christian Lillinger & Tobias Delius	Dicht	2017
RPR1058	Nate Wooley	Battle Pieces 2	2017
RPR1059	Fred Van Hove & Roger Turner	The Corner	2017
RPR1060	Isabelle Duthoit & Franz Hautzinger	Lily	2017
RPR1061	Magda Mayas & Jim Denley	Tempe Jetz	2017
RPR1062	Ben Hall's Racehorse Names (with Levin-Decanini, Morris, Dierker, Dobday, Khoury, Zawadi)	The New Favorite Thing Called Breathing	2018
RPR1063	Brandon Lopez, Matthew Nelson, Andria Nicodemou, Gerald Cleaver	The Industry Of Entropy	2018
RPR1064	Kirk Knuffke & Ben Goldberg	Uncompahgre	2018
RPR1065	Mark Nauseef (with Laswell, Quintus, Jarvinen, Tadić, Oxley, Thomas, Courvoisier)	All In All In All	2018
RPR1066	Stephanie Richards	Fullmoon	2018
RPR1067	Rudi Mahall & Alexander von Schlippenbach	So Far	2018
RPR1068	Tomeka Reid, Kyoko Kitamura, Taylor Ho Bynum, Joe Morris	Geometry of Caves	2018
RPR1069	Flamingo (Adam Pultz Melbye, Chris Heenan, Christian Windfeld, Roy Carroll)	LOUD	2018
RPR1070	Tatakai Trio (Anders Lindsjö, Martin Küchen, Raymond Strid)	Happī	2018
RPR1071	Irene Aranda, Johannes Nästesjö, Núria Andorrà	Inner Core	2018
RPR1072	Samara Lubelski & Bill Nace	Samara Lubelski / Bill Nace	2018
RPR1073	Benjamín Vergara, Keefe Jackson, Jim Baker, Phil Sudderberg	The Hallowed Plant	2018
RPR1074	Paul Rogers, Olaf Rupp, Frank Paul Schubert	Three Stories About Rain, Sunlight And The Hidden Soil	2018
RPR1075	Fish-Scale Sunrise (Ab Baars, Joe Williamson, Kaja Draksler)	No Queen Rises	2018
RPR1076	Ingrid Laubrock & Tom Rainey	Utter	2018
RPR1077	Michael Foster, Michael Zerang, Katherine Young	Bind The Hand(s) That Feed	2018
RPR1078	James Brandon Lewis (with Stewart, Crudup III, Pirog, Branch)	An UnRuly Manifesto	2019
RPR1079	Bruce Ackley, Fred Frith, Henry Kaiser, Aram Shelton	Unexpected Twins	2019
RPR1080	Guillermo Gregorio & Brandon Lopez	12 Episodes	2019
RPR1081	Tomeka Reid / Filippo Monico	The Mouser	2019
RPR1082	Jessica Pavone	In The Action	2019
RPR1083	Eugene Chadbourne & Henry Kaiser	Wind Crystals: Guitar Duets By Wadada Leo Smith	2019
RPR1084	Michel Doneda & Lê Quan Ninh	Thirty Ways To Avoid Talking	2019
RPR1085	Paul Flaherty	Focused & Bewildered	2019
RPR1086	Zeena Parkins & Wobbly	Triplicates	2019
RPR1087	Steve Baczkowski, Brandon Lopez, Chris Corsano	Old Smoke	2019
RPR1088	Christine Abdelnour & Chris Corsano	Quand Fond La Neige, Où Va Le Blanc?	2019
RPR1089	Udo Schindler & Jaap Blonk	Hillside Talks	2019
RPR1090	Hook, Line And Sinker (Borghini, Dörner, Delius, Honsinger)	Fishy Business	2019
RPR1090EP	Virginia Genta	Amplified Sopranino Sax	2019
RPR1091	Tipple (David Watson, Frode Gjerstad, Kevin Norton)	Cartoon Heart	2019
RPR1092	Masahiko Satoh, Otomo Yoshihide, Roger Turner	Sea	2019
RPR1093	Ramon Lopez & Mark Feldman	Trappist-1	2019
RPR1094	Ig Henneman, Jaimie Branch, Anne La Berge	Dropping Stuff And Other Folk Songs	2019
RPR1095	Joanna Mattrey	Veiled	2020
RPR1096	Kyoko Kitamura, Joe Morris, Tomeka Reid, Taylor Ho Bynum	Geometry of Distance	2019
RPR1097	Nate Wooley	Battle Pieces 4	2019
RPR1098	Susan Alcorn, Leila Bordreuil, Ingrid Laubrock	Bird Meets Wire	2021
RPR1099	Neuringer, Dulberger, Masri	Dromedaries II	2020
RPR1100	John Blum & Jackson Krall	Duplexity	2020
RPR1101	Estamos Trio (Escobar, Tamez, McDonas)	Dire Warning	2020
RPR1102	Samara Lubelski	Partial Infinite Sequence	2020
RPR1103	Tim Berne & Nasheet Waits	The Coandă Effect	2020
RPR1104	Peter Brötzmann & Fred Lonberg-Holm	Memories of a Tunicate	2020
RPR1105	Alex Ward	Frames	2020
RPR1106	Alex Ward Item 4 (with Lisle, Keeffe, Willberg)	Where We Were	2020
RPR1107	Birgit Ulher & Franz Hautzinger	Kleine Trompetenmusik	2020
RPR1108	Brad Henkel & Jacob Wick	Lovely Bag You Have	2020
RPR1109	MoE (Guro Skumsnes Moe & Håvard Skaset) with Mette Rasmussen and Ikuro Takahashi	Painted	2020
RPR1110	gabby fluke-mogul	threshold	2020
RPR1111	Susan Alcorn Quintet (with Feldman, Halvorson, Formanek, Sawyer)	Pedernal	2020
RPR1112	Leap Of Faith (Glynis Lomon, PEK)	Principles Of An Open Future	2020
RPR1113	Signe Emmeluth	Hi Hello I'm Signe	2021
RPR1114	Frode Gjerstad & Isach Skeidsvoll	Twenty Fingers	2021
RPR1115	Two Much: Reut Regev & Igal Foni	Never Enough	2021
RPR1116	Hermione Johnson	Tremble	2020
RPR1117	Schubert / Schlippenbach / Blume	Forge	2020
RPR1118	Zeena Parkins, Mette Rasmussen, Ryan Sawyer	Glass Triangle	2021
RPR1119	Jooklo Trio (David Vanzan, Virginia Genta, Brandon Lopez)	It Is What It Is	2020
RPR1120	Magda Mayas' Filamental (with Theriot, A. Davies, Caddy, Abdelnour, Thieke, R. Davies, Parkins)	Confluence	2021
RPR1121	Michel Doneda, Frédéric Blondy, Tetsu Saitoh	Spring Road 16	2021
RPR1122	Barre Phillips, John Butcher, Ståle Liavik Solberg	We Met - And Then	2021
RPR1123	López Trio (Brandon López with Cleaver, Baczkowski, and guest Cecilia López)	Live At Roulette	2021
RPR1124	Liz Allbee	Rille	2021
RPR1125	Ava Mendoza	New Spells	2021
RPR1126	Robbie Avenaim, Chris Abrahams, Jim Denley	Weft	2021
RPR1127	Cranes: Matthias Müller, Eve Risser, Christian Marien	Formation < Deviation	2021
RPR1128	Jessica Pavone	When No One Around You is There but Nowhere to be Found	2022
RPR1129	Violeta García & Chris Pitsiokos	Uanmortaim	2021
RPR1130	Alex Zethson Ensemble (with Larsson, Lindal, Toorell, Bergman, Arapis, Runsteen, Ingves, Agnas, Svensson, Hellgren, Lindström, Zetterberg)	Some Of Them Were Never Unprepared	2021
RPR1131	Ingrid Laubrock & Tom Rainey	Counterfeit Mars	2022
RPR1132	Steph Richards with Joshua White	Zephyr	2021
RPR1133	Cecilia Lopez	Red	2021
RPR1134	Gregg Belisle-Chi Performing The Music Of Tim Berne	Koi	2021
RPR1135	Cath Roberts & Olie Brice	Conduits	2022
RPR1136	Lisa Ullén, Elsa Bergman, Anna Lund	Space	2022
RPR1137	Masked Pickle (Clara Weil, Olivia Scemama, Tom Malmendier)	7	2022
RPR1138	Child Of Illusion (Chris Pitsiokos, Susana Santos Silva, Torbjörn Zetterberg)	Khimaira	2022
RPR1139	Matthew Bourne & Emil Karlsen	The Embalmer	2022
RPR1140	Kaluza & Roder (Anna Kaluza, Jan Roder)	Am Frankfurter Tor	2022
RPR1141	gabby fluke-mogul	Love Songs	2022
RPR1142	Forbes Graham (with Brandon Lopez, Cecilia Lopez)	Another Day, Another Vector	2022
RPR1143	Joanna Mattrey & gabby fluke-mogul	Oracle	2022
RPR1144	Reid, Kitamura, Bynum, Morris	Geometry Of Trees	2022
RPR1148	Tamio Shiraishi	月 (Moon)	2022
RPR1149	Rasmussen / Flaherty / Rowden / Corsano	Crying in Space	2023
RPR1151	Tristan Kasten-Krause & Jessica Pavone	Images of One	2023
RPR1157	Pulverize The Sound (Pride, Evans, Dahl)	Black	2022
RPR1158	Kelsey Mines	Look Like	2022
RPR1159	Fred Moten, Brandon López, Gerald Cleaver	Moten / López / Cleaver	2022
RPR1160	Susan Alcorn, Patrick Holmes, Ryan Sawyer	From Union Pool	2023
RPR1161	Dimitriadis, Dörner, Freedman, Parkins, Williams	BeingFive	2022
RPR1179	Fie Schouten, Vincent Courtois, Guus Janssen	VOSTOK Remote Islands	2023

=== Relative Pitch Records: Solo Series (RPRSS) ===
Cat. Number	Artist	Title	Year
RPRSS001	Erin Rogers	Dawntreader	2019
RPRSS002	Masayoshi Urabe	What Hasn't Come Here, COME!	2019
RPRSS003	Tamio Shiraishi	Sora	2020
RPRSS004	Chris Pitsiokos	Speak In Tongues	2020
RPRSS005	Erin Rogers	2000 Miles	2021
RPRSS006	Michael Foster	The Industrious Tongue Of Michael Foster	2022
RPRSS007	Violeta García	Fobia	2022
RPRSS008	Amidea Clotet	Trasluz	2022
RPRSS009	Robbie Lee	Prismatist	2022
RPRSS010	Aaron Burnett	Correspondence	2022
RPRSS011	Masayo Koketsu	Fukiya	2022
RPRSS012	Chris Pitsiokos	Art of the Alto	2022
RPRSS013	Sakina Abdou	Goodbye Ground	2022
RPRSS014	Marta Warelis	A Grain Of Earth	2022
RPRSS015	Don Malfon	Mutable	2022
RPRSS016	Jon Lipscomb	Conscious Without Function	2022
RPRSS017	Alexandra Grimal	Refuge	2022

=== Relative Pitch Records: Digital Only (RPRDL) ===
Year	Artist	Title	Cat. Number
RPRDL001	Matthew Wright with Samples Of Evan Parker, Toma Gouband, Mark Nauseef	Locked Hybrids	2020
RPRDL002	Close Scrape (Matthew Wright, Adam Linson)	CUTOUT	2021
RPRDL003	Biliana Voutchkova & Michael Zerang	The Emerald Figurines	2022
RPRDL004	Biliana Voutchkova & Leila Bordreuil	The Seventh Water	2022
RPRDL005	Kelsey Mines	To Actually Create Everywhere	2022
RPRDL006	Biliana Voutchkova & Joanna Mattrey	Like Thoughts Coming	2022
RPRDL007	Biliana Voutchkova & Susana Santos Silva	Bagra	2022
RPRDL008	Biliana Voutchkova & Tomeka Reid	Bricolage III	2022
RPRDL009	Biliana Voutchkova & Jeff Surak	The Truth About The Key	2022
RPRDL010	Biliana Voutchkova & Charmaine Lee	I am going to make an attempt to describe what you mean to me	2022
