= Artifacts (Nicole Mitchell album) =

Studio album by Nicole Mitchell, Tomeka Reid, Mike Reed
- Released: 2015
- Recorded: 2015
- Genre: Jazz
- Length: 46:13
- Label: 482 Music

Nicole Mitchell chronology
The Secret Escapades of Velvet Anderson (2014)	Artifacts (2015)	Moments of Fatherhood (2016)

Tomeka Reid chronology
Tomeka Reid Quartet (2015)	Artifacts (2015)	Nettles (2016)

Artifacts is an album by a collective trio consisting of Nicole Mitchell on flute and electronics, Tomeka Reid on cello and Mike Reed on drums, which was recorded in 2015 and released on 482 Music. The trio, conceived by Tomeka Reid for a concert in Seattle early in 2015, was formed to celebrate the legacy of the Association for the Advancement of Creative Musicians during its 50th anniversary, interpreting compositions by some of its members. Cover art by Lewis Achenbach, created live during the 50th anniversary of the AACM at Mandel Hall in Chicago.

== Music ==
"Composition 23B" was composed by Anthony Braxton, originally from the album Quartet: Live at Moers Festival. "Jo Jar" is a composition by Roscoe Mitchell dedicated to Joseph Jarman, which was recorded by his Quartet in 1966 and released in 2011 in the album Before There Was Sound. Bernice, a piece written by Fred Anderson, is coupled with "Days Fly By with Ruby", a Jeff Parker's composition based on a Fred Anderson saxophone riff. "The Clowns" is a Leroy Jenkins's piece originally from the album Space Minds, New Worlds, Survival of America. "Have Mercy on Us" is by Amina Claudine Myers, originally from the album Song for Mother E. "B.K." and "I'll Be Right Here Waiting" are two compositions by Steve McCall, originally from the albums Air Mail and Air Time. "Munkt Munk" is a Muhal Richard Abrams composition from his album Colors in Thirty-Third. "Light on the Path" was written by Edward Wilkerson, originally from the album Sideshow by the band 8 Bold Souls.

== Reception ==
Professional ratings
Review scores
Source	Rating
Down Beat	4/5 stars

The Down Beat review by Bill Meyer notes "The performances are pithy and lucid, which makes for satisfying listening, and also makes the record accessible enough to be a good introduction to the avant-garde."

The All About Jazz review by Hrayr Attarian states "Expressive and frantic at times, tender and impressionistic at others this cohesive and fascinating record is a reflection of a shared artistic vision. One that not only brings together three contemporary masters of extemporized music but also spans half a century and defines an intrepid and revolutionary movement that keeps going strong."

== Track listing ==
1. "Composition 23B" (Anthony Braxton) – 3:26
2. "Jo Jar" (Roscoe Mitchell) – 4:35
3. "Bernice / Days Fly By with Ruby" (Fred Anderson / Jeff Parker) – 8:15
4. "The Clowns" (Leroy Jenkins) – 4:28
5. "Have Mercy on Us" (Amina Claudine Myers) – 6:06
6. "B.K." (Steve McCall) – 5:48
7. "I'll Be Right Here Waiting" (Steve McCall) – 3:11
8. "Munkt Munk" (Muhal Richard Abrams) – 4:30
9. "Light on the Path" (Edward Wilkerson) – 5:54

== Personnel ==
- Nicole Mitchell - flute, electronics
- Tomeka Reid – cello
- Mike Reed – drums
