= The Mouser =

Studio album by Tomeka Reid and Filippo Monico
- Released: 2019
- Recorded: 2015
- Studio: Studio of Filippo Monico, Milano, Italy
- Genre: Free improvisation
- Label: Relative Pitch; RPR1081
- Producer: Tomeka Reid

Tomeka Reid chronology
Antichamber Music (2019)	The Mouser (2019)	Old New (2019)

The Mouser is an album by cellist Tomeka Reid and percussionist Filippo Monico. It was recorded during 2015 at Monico's studio in Milano, Italy, and was released in 2019 by Relative Pitch Records.

According to Reid, she and Monico had never played together prior to the recording session. She stated that she had forgotten about the meeting until Monico presented her with a thumb drive of the session in 2017, and was pleasantly surprised by the results.

== Reception ==
Professional ratings
Review scores
Source	Rating
All About Jazz	3.5/5 stars
The Free Jazz Collective	4.5/5 stars
Tom Hull – on the Web	A−

In a review for All About Jazz, John Sharpe wrote: "this is one of those albums where the focus is more on the dialogue between two people than any preconceived notions of the roles of the instruments themselves... What is remarkable for such a first time meeting is that there is none of the tentativeness which sometimes afflicts such encounters. And furthermore they avoid the obvious, to the extent that you never quite know what is coming next in their restless exchanges."

Ivana Ng of The New York City Jazz Record called the album "an intimate session" and "unstructured play at its best." She stated: "Imaginative and daring, the two dive into the margins and depths of the cello and drums to uncover a much richer instrumentation and aural palette than one would expect from a duo... [the musicians] have a natural rapport immediately apparent from the very first note. Their interplay is cerebral yet joyful."

The Downtown Music Gallery's Bruce Lee Gallanter commented: "The music here has a most organic, natural sounding quality, especially since both instruments are completely acoustic... This is an extraordinary duo with both players pushing their sounds past normal constraints. Somewhat low-key but no less incredible!"

A reviewer for Poison Pie Publishing House remarked: "We can't immediately identify another cello and drums duet, but presumably in the history of human music-making, such a combination has previously manifested. Even so, it is unlikely that the sort of music that emerged bore any resemblance to that which Ms. Reid and Mr. Monico coax from their respective instruments."

Writing for The Free Jazz Collective, Olle Lawson described the album as "a wonderful, fully-improvised document of shifting tonal colour, empathic interplay and dark, layered feeling - finally capturing on record the freer depth of Ms Reid's evolving art... Highly Recommended."

== Track listing ==
Composed by Tomeka Reid and Filippo Monico.

1. "Without Recourse" – 13:18
2. "Walk Within the Eye of the Storm" – 4:35
3. "The Mouser" – 4:39
4. "Wefting Through a Starry Sky" – 11:00
5. "Intimations of Things to Come" – 4:40

== Personnel ==
- Tomeka Reid – cello
- Filippo Monico – drums, percussion
