= Signaling (album) =

Studio album by Nick Mazzarella and Tomeka Reid
- Released: 2017
- Recorded: April 17, 2015
- Studio: Fox Hall Studio, Chicago
- Genre: Free improvisation
- Length: 38:57
- Label: Nessa ncd-39

Tomeka Reid chronology
Nettles (2016)	Signaling (2017)	Geometry of Caves (2018)

Signaling is an album by saxophonist Nick Mazzarella and cellist Tomeka Reid. It was recorded on April 17, 2015, at Fox Hall Studio in Chicago, and was released in 2017 by Nessa Records.

Prior to the recording, Mazzarella and Reid had never performed as a duo. They prepared for the session, which was fully improvised, by trading and discussing albums that involve the pairing of saxophone and cello, especially those of Julius Hemphill and Abdul Wadud, who frequently recorded together, often as a duo. Reid recalled: "When I discovered that he loved those records as much as I did, we definitely thought about doing something together—with that spirit and energy in mind." Signaling's opening track, "Blues for Julius and Abdul," pays explicit homage to Hemphill and Wadud, and sets the tone for the remainder of the album.

== Reception ==
Professional ratings
Review scores
Source	Rating
All About Jazz	4.5/5 stars
The Free Jazz Collective	4.5/5 stars

Bill Meyer of DownBeat noted: "While the session was improvised, their common intent resulted in music that melds elegant chamber interplay with the emotional impact of down-home blues."

In a review for All About Jazz, Troy Dostert wrote: "it's clear that Mazzarella and Reid have immersed themselves in the waters of 1970s and 1980s avant-garde jazz. The results are invigorating and inspiring... It is a delight to hear the spirit of some of the most formative years of avant-garde jazz advanced with such skill and reverence by these two outstanding improvisers. Both do justice to their musical forerunners' legacy with music that is both beautiful and expertly played."

Stereogum's Phil Freeman stated that Mazzarella and Reid capture the spirit of the Hemphill/Wadud duo on the opening track, "but as the album goes on they reveal that they've got plenty of their own ideas, too," noting that "the combination of saxophone and cello might seem a little minimal on its surface, but there's a lot of depth here."

Peter Margasak of the Chicago Reader called the album "superb," and commented: "the pair push into... abstract terrain, alternating between measured aggression... and hollowed-out delicateness... On the surface it might appear that Mazzarella is running the game, but Reid's elegant lines and gestures prod more than follow."

Writing for Dusted Magazine, Derek Taylor remarked: "each of the nine pieces offers a wealth of inspired activity and interaction... The gerund in the disc's title isn't just concerned with broadcasting influences. It's also a germane watchword for the close communication that constantly transpires between Mazzarella and Reid and by after-the-fact proxy with the presumable (and hopefully broad) audience for this album."

In an article for Jazz Weekly, George W. Harris wrote: "Both use their instruments in a rich mix of moods and affects, with the reed chirping to edgy bowing... and mournful bowing and sighing sounds... Conversational music."

Eric McDowell of The Free Jazz Collective stated: "Mazzarella and Reid have only each other to interact with—a task for which they're more than equipped. While 'dialogue' could well describe the fragmentary, equal exchange of musical ideas that results, the chosen title better captures the telepathically sensitive interplay between the two musicians."

Bird is the Worm's Dave Sumner commented: "Both familiar and strange, the music has a universal nature, tied to no decade and yet tied to all, where a heartfelt melodic voicing and a wide open path speak to music past and present."

Critic Francis Davis included the album in his NPR list of 2017's best jazz albums. The editors of Burning Ambulance also included the album in their year-end list of favorite jazz releases.

== Track listing ==
Composed by Nick Mazzarella and Tomeka Reid.

1. "Blues for Julius and Abdul" – 6:37
2. "Signaling" – 3:51
3. "Like So Many Drops of Water" – 3:58
4. "Interstices" – 2:07
5. "The Ancestors Speak" – 4:18
6. "Topographies" – 7:27
7. "Rediscovery of an Age" – 4:31
8. "Let It Be Known" – 5:14
9. "Invoking a Spirit" – 2:12

== Personnel ==
- Nick Mazzarella – alto saxophone
- Tomeka Reid – cello
