= Four Ways (album) =

Studio album by Roscoe Mitchell and Yugonaut
- Released: 2017
- Recorded: October 16 & 17, 2009
- Studio: Duderstadt Media Commons, University of Michigan
- Genre: Jazz
- Length: 62:41
- Label: Nessa; Ncd-38
- Producer: Chuck Nessa

Roscoe Mitchell chronology
Celebrating Fred Anderson (2015)	Four Ways (2017)	Bells for the South Side (2017)

Four Ways is an album by American jazz saxophonist Roscoe Mitchell, with Stephen Rush's band Yuganaut which was recorded in 2009 at the University of Michigan in Ann Arbor and released on Nessa in 2017.

== Reception ==
The dusted review by Derek Taylor says "Yuganaut’s methods and aesthetics draw immediate antecedents in Mitchell’s iconic Art Ensemble of Chicago, most obviously in the trio’s incorporation of a broad of assortment of instruments into its arsenal. With Mitchell added, Rush estimates their number at approaching fifty, although only a fraction of that number are pressed into service on the disc ... Rush notes his ardent willingness for further collaborations. Here's one listener who's hoping Mitchell takes him up on the offer."

== Track listing ==
All compositions by Roscoe Mitchell except where indicated

1. "Double Helix" (Tom Abbs) – 4:54
2. "Improvisation No. 1" – 5:58
3. "Improvisation No. 2" – 3:13
4. "Improvisation No. 3" – 4:14
5. "Cards for Yuganaut No. 1" – 7:33
6. "Cards for Yuganaut No. 2" – 9:49
7. "Cards for Yuganaut No. 3" – 8:06
8. "Four Ways for Yuganaut and Roscoe Mitchell" (Stephen Rush) – 10:58
9. "Son Warship" (Geoff Mann) – 7:53

== Personnel ==
- Roscoe Mitchell - flute, soprano saxophone, alto saxophone
- Stephen Rush – Micromoog, Fender Rhodes, trombone, euphonium, ocarina, slide whistle, melodica, recorder, balloon
- Tom Abbs –– bass, cello, violin, tuba, didgeridoo
- Geoff Mann – drums, cornet, banjo
