= Cloudward =

Studio album by Mary Halvorson
- Released: January 19, 2024
- Studio: Sear Sound, New York City, US
- Genre: Avant-garde jazz
- Length: 47:33
- Label: Nonesuch
- Producer: John Dieterich

Mary Halvorson chronology
| Amaryllis (2022) | Cloudward (2024) |

Cloudward is an album by American jazz composer and guitarist Mary Halvorson, released on January 19, 2024, through Nonesuch Records. It was recorded with her sextet Amaryllis, produced by John Dieterich, and received acclaim from critics.

== Critical reception ==
Professional ratings
Aggregate scores
| Source | Rating |
|---|---|
| Metacritic | 85/100 |
Review scores
| Source | Rating |
| AllMusic | 4/5 stars |
| The Guardian | 4/5 stars |
| Pitchfork | 7.8/10 |
| PopMatters | 9/10 |
| Uncut | 8/10 |

Cloudward received a score of 85 out of 100 on review aggregator Metacritic based on six critics' reviews, indicating "universal acclaim". Uncut characterized it as "a knottily intricate yet oddly inviting album". Thom Jurek of AllMusic wrote that "these eight compositions differ somewhat from those on Amaryllis, though they remain easily identifiable as Halvorson's" and felt that "she offers more blank and interactive spaces on Cloudward". The Quietus' Lottie Brazier called it "rich and increasingly organic-sounding" as well as "upbeat, curious, and inquisitive" and "a great city walking album".

John Fordham of The Guardian described it as "a superb eight-piece set" on which "Halvorson's fusions of written and spontaneous music reach an entrancing new seamlessness and seductive warmth". Pitchfork's Andy Cush likened it to "a document of edges melting away" as "Halvorson puts her idiosyncratic instrumentation to good use". Chris Ingalls of PopMatters stated that Cloudward "doesn't necessarily see [Halvorson] breaking new ground – it's the second album she's recorded with this sextet – but from a compositional and improvisational standpoint, it sees her continuing to hone and perfect her artistic excellence".

=== Year-end lists ===
Select 2024 year-end rankings for Cloudward
| Publication/critic | Accolade | Rank | Ref. |
|---|---|---|---|
| PopMatters | 80 Best Albums of 2024 | 35 | |
| The Quietus | The Quietus' Albums of the Year 2024 | 40 | |
| Slate | 12 Best Albums of 2024 | unranked | |

== Track listing ==
Cloudward track listing
| No. | Title | Length |
|---|---|---|
| 1. | "The Gate" | 4:32 |
| 2. | "The Tower" | 8:08 |
| 3. | "Collapsing Mouth" | 5:55 |
| 4. | "Unscrolling" | 5:19 |
| 5. | "Desiderata" | 6:36 |
| 6. | "Incarnadine" | 4:12 |
| 7. | "Tailhead" | 4:35 |
| 8. | "Ultramarine" | 8:16 |
| Total length: | | 47:33 |

== Personnel ==
- Mary Halvorson – guitars
- Jacob Garchik – trombone
- Nick Dunston – double bass
- Tomas Fujiwara – drums
- Patricia Brennan – vibraphone
- Adam O'Farrill – trumpet
- Laurie Anderson – violin

== Charts ==
Chart performance for Cloudward
| Chart (2024) | Peak position |
|---|---|
| UK Album Downloads (OCC) | 71 |
