= Sound (Roscoe Mitchell album) =

1966 debut album by Roscoe Mitchell

Studio album by Roscoe Mitchell
- Released: 1966
- Recorded: August 10–26, 1966
- Studio: Sound Studios (Chicago)
- Genre: Free jazz, avant-garde
- Length: 37:12
- Label: Delmark
- Producer: Robert G. Koester

Roscoe Mitchell chronology
Before There Was Sound (2011)	Sound (1966)	Old/Quartet (1967)

Sound is the debut album by free jazz saxophonist Roscoe Mitchell, recorded in 1966 and released on the Delmark label. It features performances by Mitchell, Lester Bowie, Malachi Favors, Maurice McIntyre, Lester Lashley and Alvin Fielder. The CD reissue includes two takes of "Sound", which were edited together to form the original LP version, and an alternative take of "Ornette".

According to Alvin Fielder, "[the] music was rehearsed. It sounds unrehearsed but it was that loose...For Sound, we rehearsed four to five days per week...It took us two recording days to do Sound and it went well." Wadada Leo Smith commented: "It's no accident that Roscoe called that important piece of his Sound. Sound - not pitch - that's the difference." According to Mitchell, "[t]he musicians are free to make any sound they think will do, any sound that they hear at a particular time. That could be like somebody who felt like stomping on the floor... well, he would stomp on the floor. And you notice the approach of the musicians to their instruments is a little different from what one would normally hear... I always 'felt' a lot of instruments - and I feel myself being drawn to it. I'm getting more interested in music as strictly atmosphere, not so much of just standing up playing for playing's sake, but my mind stretches out to other things, like creating different sounds."

== Reception ==
Professional ratings
Review scores
Source	Rating
Penguin Guide to Jazz	4/4 stars
AllMusic	5/5 stars
The Rolling Stone Jazz Record Guide	5/5 stars

The Penguin Guide to Jazz selected the album as part of its suggested Core Collection. The authors wrote: "What a vital, electrifying document this remains!... Mitchell organizes his group around the notion of sounds entering into - and interrelating with - silence. So there are tiny gestures and startling emptinesses alongside long lines and soliloquies... Both a manifesto and an unrepeatable event, Sound remains a marvel."

The AllMusic review by Steve Huey awarded the album 5 stars, stating, "Structurally, Sound heralded a whole new approach to free improvisation; where most previous free jazz prized an unrelenting fever pitch of emotion, Sound was full of wide-open spaces between instruments, an agreeably rambling pace in between the high-energy climaxes, and a more abstract quality to its solos. Steady rhythmic pulses were mostly discarded in favor of collective, spontaneous dialogues and novel textures (especially with the less orthodox instruments, which had tremendous potential for flat-out weird noises). Simply put, it's an exploration of pure sound."

The album was identified by Chris Kelsey in his AllMusic essay "Free Jazz: A Subjective History" as one of the 20 Essential Free Jazz Albums. Elliott Sharp called the album "one of Mitchell's finest early moments" and included it in his list "Ten Free Jazz Albums to Hear Before You Die".

== Influence ==
The album's influence on other improvisers was considerable: "Sound's concepts of texture, space, and interaction would shortly be expanded upon in classic recordings by Anthony Braxton, Muhal Richard Abrams, the Art Ensemble of Chicago, and others; the repercussions from its expansion of free jazz's tonal and emotional palettes are still being felt".

== Track listing ==
=== Original LP ===
All compositions by Roscoe Mitchell

Side One

1. "Ornette – 5:22
2. "The Little Suite" – 10:20

Side Two

1. "Sound" – 21:30

=== CD Reissue ===
1. "Ornette" [alternative take] – 5:44
2. "Sound 1" – 26:36
3. "The Little Suite" – 10:27
4. "Ornette" – 5:29
5. "Sound 2" – 19:24

== Personnel ==
- Roscoe Mitchell – alto saxophone, clarinet, flute, recorder
- Lester Bowie – trumpet, flugelhorn, harmonica
- Malachi Favors – bass
- Maurice McIntyre – tenor saxophone
- Lester Lashley – trombone, cello
- Alvin Fielder – percussion
