= Moments of Fatherhood =

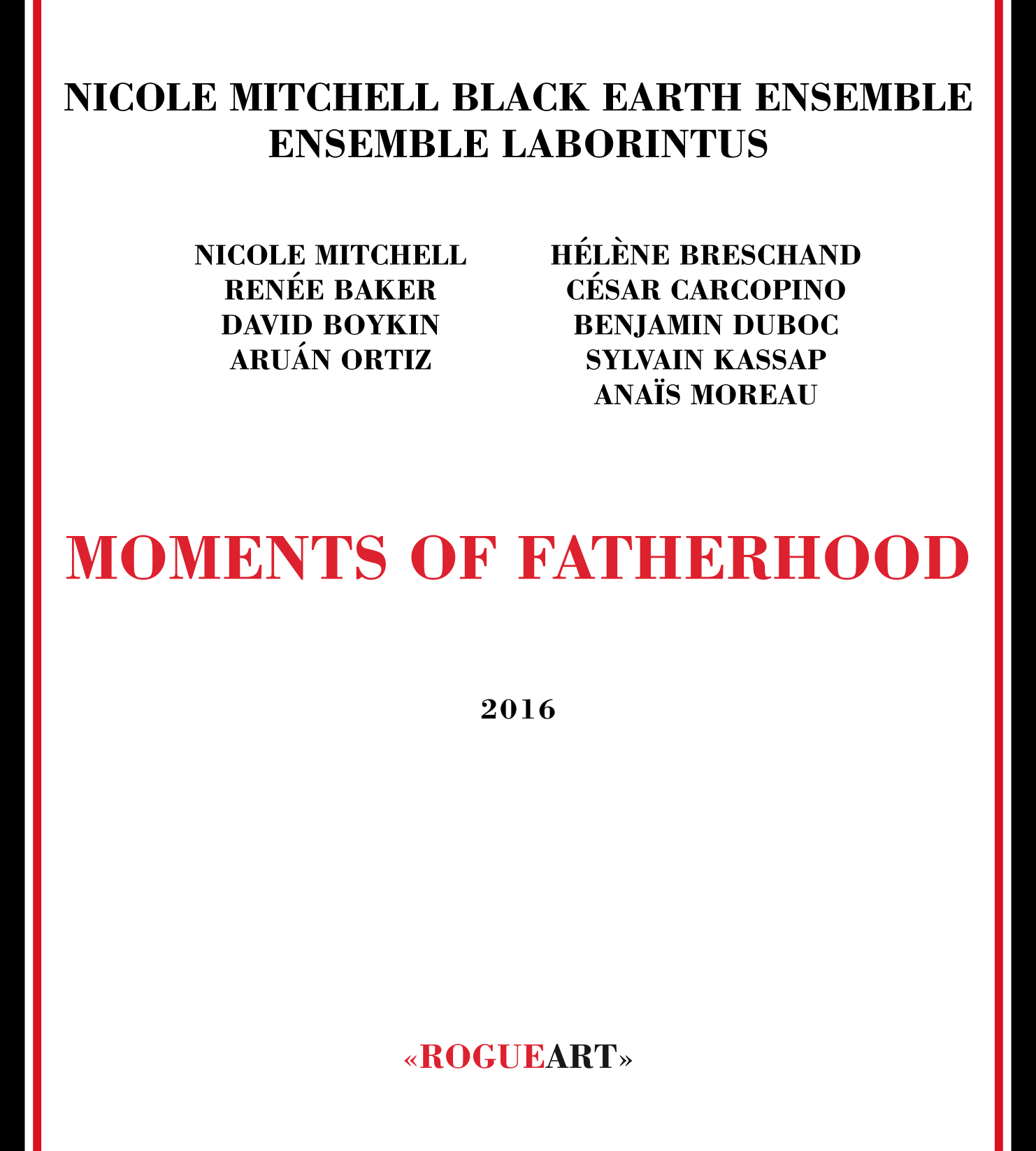

Studio album by Nicole Mitchell
- Released: 2016
- Recorded: January 31 & February 1, 2015
- Studio: Sextan, Malakoff, France
- Genre: Jazz
- Length: 64:22
- Label: RogueArt
- Producer: Nicole Mitchell & Laborintus

Nicole Mitchell chronology
Artifacts (2015)	Moments of Fatherhood (2016)	Mandorla Awakening II (2017)

Moments of Fatherhood is an album by American jazz flautist Nicole Mitchell's Black Earth Ensemble with French contemporary music Ensemble Laborintus, which was recorded in 2015 and released on the French RogueArt label. The album is inspired by a collection of photographs that civil rights activist W.E.B. Du Bois put together for The Exhibit of American Negroes at the 1900 World's Exposition in Paris.

== Reception ==
The All About Jazz review by John Sharpe states "By the end it's clear that Mitchell has created a highly imaginative tapestry in which composed and extemporized elements interweave to reflect not only the poignancy and humanity of the original photographic sources, but also their relevance to present-day existence."

== Track listing ==
All compositions by Nicole Mitchell

1. "Building Stuff" – 9:11
2. "Cold Hard Facts" – 9:19
3. "Explorers" – 12:53
4. "Listening" – 12:06
5. "Only One Like Him" – 7:15
6. "A Place of Advice" – 7:55
7. "Towards Excellence" – 5:43

== Personnel ==
- Nicole Mitchell - flutes
- Renèe Baker – violin
- David Boykin – tenor sax, clarinet
- Aruán Ortiz – piano
- Hélène Breschand – harp
- Cèsar Carcopino – drums, vibraphone
- Aruán Ortiz – piano
- Benjamin Duboc – double bass
- Sylvain Kassap – clarinets
- Anaïs Moreau – cello
