= About Ghosts =

Studio album by Mary Halvorson
- Released: June 13, 2025
- Studio: Sear Sound, New York City; Masterdisk, Peekskill, New York
- Genre: Avant-garde jazz
- Length: 44:08
- Label: Nonesuch
- Producer: John Dieterich

Mary Halvorson chronology
Cloudward (2024)	About Ghosts (2025)

Singles from About Ghosts
- 1. "Carved From" Released: April 9, 2025

About Ghosts is the fourteenth studio album by American avant-garde jazz composer Mary Halvorson. It was released on June 13, 2025, via Nonesuch in vinyl, CD and digital formats.

== Background ==
Consisting of eight tracks ranging between five and seven minutes each excluding "Polyhedral", with a total runtime of approximately forty-four minutes, the album was produced by Deerhoof guitarist John Dieterich. The album was recorded on June 20–21, 2024 at Sear Sound in New York City, mixed in Minneapolis, and mastered at Masterdisk in Peekskill, New York.

It features instrument contributions from Halvorson's Amaryllis sextet in their third collaboration, alongside saxophonists Immanuel Wilkins and Brian Settles. It succeeds Halvorson's previous project, Cloudward, which was released in 2024.

The first single, "Carved From", was released on April 9, 2025, alongside a music video directed by Robert Edridge-Waks.

== Reception ==
Professional ratings
Review scores
Source	Rating
AllMusic	4/5 stars
Financial Times	4/5 stars
The Guardian	4/5 stars
PopMatters	9/10 stars

Writing for the Quietus, Andrew Taylor-Dawson referred to the album as "a storming addition to Halvorson's catalogue," stating "it builds on her past work, expanding her oeuvre and balancing beauty with imagination and experimentation." Financial Times assigned the album a rating of four stars, noting "In her latest release, About Ghosts, the improvised and pre-configured are perfectly aligned." Reed Jackson of Spin commented about the album, "About Ghosts may invoke the departed, but it's very much alive," opining that "Halvorson's fondness for nested intricacies can act as a kind of subterfuge."

PopMatters' Chris Ingalls noted about the album's predecessor that it "conveyed a sense of adventurous optimism", comparing it to About Ghosts and suggesting it reflected the same feeling. The album received a rating score of nine out of ten from the publication. AllMusic gave About Ghosts a four-star rating, stating it "offers more proof that Halvorson's Amaryllis are among the most inventive, articulate, and creatively forward-thinking ensembles playing jazz right now." The Guardian, also rating the album four stars, described the project as "a kaleidoscopic blend of angular rhythms, intricate melodies and thrilling improvisations."

== Track listing ==
About Ghosts track listing
No.	Title	Length
1.	"Full of Neon"	7:01
2.	"Carved From"	5:28
3.	"Eventidal"	6:18
4.	"Absinthian"	4:57
5.	"About Ghosts"	5:12
6.	"Amaranthine"	7:28
7.	"Polyhedral"	2:14
8.	"Endmost"	5:30
Total length:		44:08

== Personnel ==
Credits for About Ghosts adapted from Bandcamp.

- Adam O'Farrill – trumpet (1–8)
- Brian Settles – tenor saxophone (1–2, 5, 8)
- Immanuel Wilkins – alto saxophone (1–2, 4–5)
- Jacob Garchik – trombone (1–8)
- Mary Halvorson – guitar (1–8), synth (1–3, 8)
- Nick Dunston – bass (1–8)
- Patricia Brennan – vibraphone (1–8)
- Tomas Fujiwara – drums (1–8)
- John Dieterich – producer, mixing engineer
- Chris Allen – recording engineer
- Scott Hull – mastering engineer
