= Tomeka Reid Quartet =

Studio album by Tomeka Reid Quartet
- Released: 2015
- Recorded: September 1, 2014
- Studio: Strobe Recording, Chicago, Illinois
- Genre: Free jazz
- Length: 46:57
- Label: Thirsty Ear; 57210
- Producer: Mike Reed

Tomeka Reid chronology
Hairy Who & the Chicago Imagists (2014)	Tomeka Reid Quartet (2015)	Artifacts (2015)

Tomeka Reid Quartet is an album by the jazz ensemble of the same name, led by cellist and composer Tomeka Reid, and featuring guitarist Mary Halvorson, double bassist Jason Roebke, and drummer Tomas Fujiwara. It was recorded on September 1, 2014, at Strobe Recording in Chicago, Illinois, and was released in 2015 by Thirsty Ear Recordings as part of their Blue Series.

== Reception ==
Professional ratings
Review scores
Source	Rating
All About Jazz	4/5 stars
All About Jazz	5/5 stars
The Free Jazz Collective	5/5 stars
Tom Hull – on the Web	A−

In an article for The New York Times, Ben Ratliff called the album "exceptional," and described Reid as "a melodic improviser with a natural, flowing sense of song and an experimenter who can create heat and grit with the texture of sound."

Bret Saunders of The Denver Post featured the album in the #1 position in his "Best jazz albums of 2015" list, praising it as "buoyant" and "friendly."

The Chicago Tribune's Howard Reich named Reid "Chicagoan of the Year in Jazz" for 2015, describing her as a "remarkable" musician possessing "singular gifts," and calling the album "innovative" and "immensely attractive."

Writing for Point of Departure, Troy Collins noted that, with the release of the album, Reid was "poised to become one of the preeminent improvising cellists of her generation." He commented: "An impressive combination of ebullient swing and elegant deportment, Tomeka Reid Quartet is a phenomenal record" that "showcases Reid's improvisational mettle, memorable writing and keen arrangements, in addition to her magnanimous leadership abilities."

Hrayr Attarian of All About Jazz stated that the album is "a stimulating and mesmerizing work that showcases the superlative cellist's artistry at its best," and remarked: "Her exquisite instrumental prowess as well as her brilliant writing make this a singular record." AAJ's Patrick Burnette called the album "a remarkably assured recording, programmed with an excellent sense of pace and point," and wrote: "Performances don't outstay their welcome and fit together in a larger whole. This is a musical statement rather than a brochure advertising everything Reid can do."

Critic Kevin Whitehead of NPR Music suggested that the album's lineup "draws a connection to Chico Hamilton's chamber jazz quintet from the '50s," but noted that "Reid's foursome gets more low-down." He commented: "The strings bind together nicely, and the drums give them a propulsive kick. There's good chemistry all around."

In a 5-star review for The Free Jazz Collective, Tom Burris called the album "an absolute gem," and stated that "this music brings pure unadulterated joy into the world." He remarked: "Reid's vision is broad and all-encompassing. Every new sound is intuitively balanced by the introduction of its polar opposite. It is idealistic and inclusive. Who wouldn't want to inhabit this world?"

== Track listing ==
"17 West" composed by Eric Dolphy. "Improv #1" composed by Tomeka Reid and Mary Halvorson. Remaining tracks composed by Tomeka Reid.

1. "17 West" – 3:07
2. "Etoile" – 8:38
3. "Billy Bang's Bounce" – 4:42
4. "Improv #1" – 1:17
5. "Glass Light" – 5:37
6. "Woodlawn" – 6:02
7. "Super Nova" – 4:50
8. "The Lone Wait" – 6:22
9. "Samo Swing" – 3:02
10. "Improv #2" – 2:53

== Personnel ==
- Tomeka Reid – cello
- Mary Halvorson – guitar
- Jason Roebke – double bass
- Tomas Fujiwara – drums
