= Tomeka Reid =

American jazz musician (born 1977)

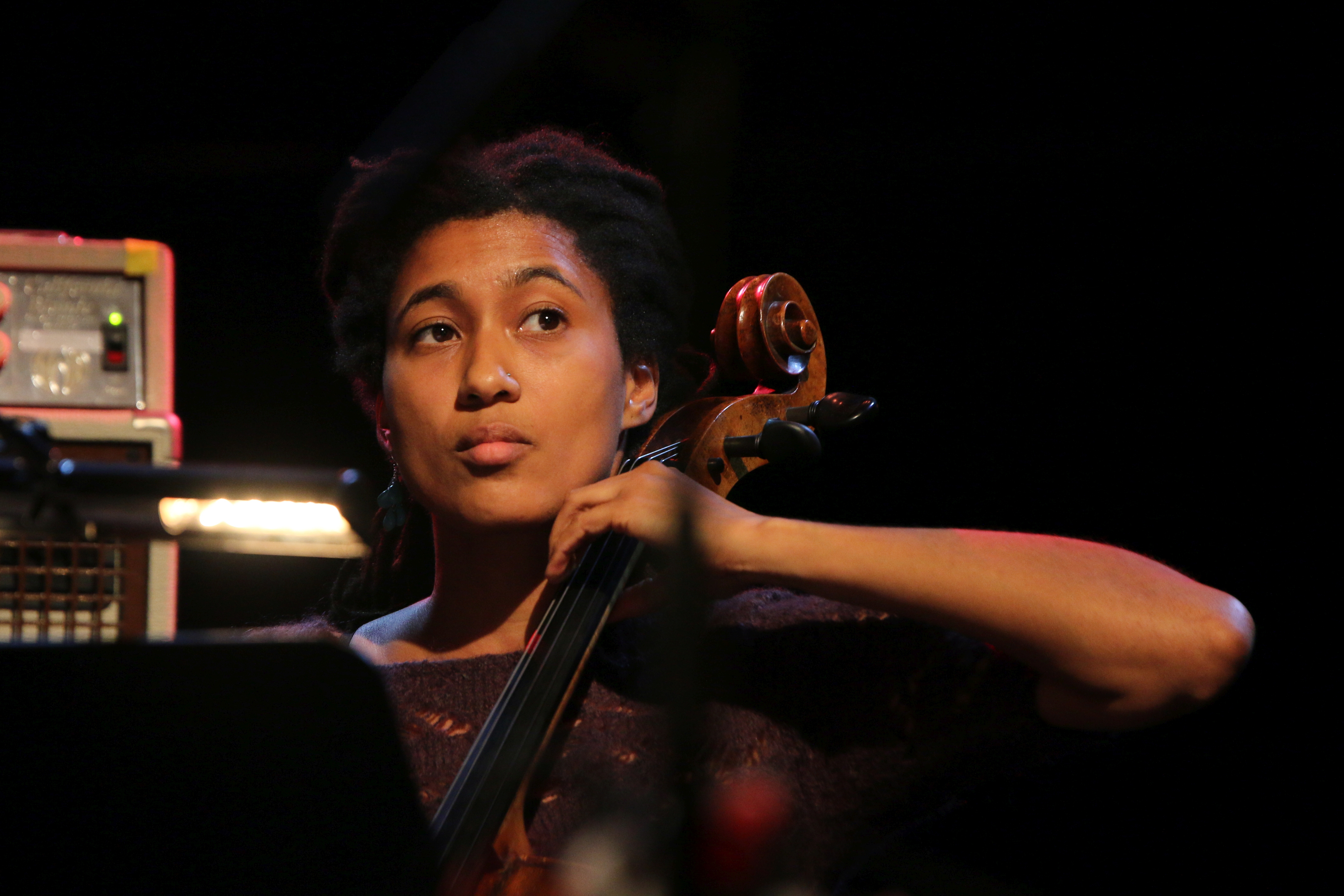
- Tomeka Reid performs at the Deutsches Jazzfestival in 2015.

Background information
- Born: 1977 (age 48–49); Washington, D.C., United States
- Genres: Avant-garde jazz; improvised music
- Occupations: Composer; improviser; teacher
- Instrument: Cello
- Labels: Cuneiform; Thirsty Ear; Relative Pitch; International Anthem
- Website: tomekareid.net

Tomeka Reid (born 1977) is an American composer, improviser, cellist, curator, and teacher.

Reid has performed and recorded with the Art Ensemble of Chicago, Nicole Mitchell, Anthony Braxton, the AACM Great Black Music Ensemble, Mike Reed's Loose Assembly, and Roscoe Mitchell. She leads the Tomeka Reid Quartet, with Tomas Fujiwara, Jason Roebke, and Mary Halvorson, and is co-leader of Hear in Now, a trio with Mazz Swift and Silvia Bolognesi.

Reid founded and, as of 2026, still runs the now-annual Chicago Jazz String Summit and was named a 2017 "Chicago Jazz Hero" by the Jazz Journalists Association. In 2019, Reid was appointed Darius Milhaud Distinguished Visiting Professor at Mills College. She is a 2021 United States Artists Fellow and 2022 MacArthur Fellow.

== Early life and classical education ==
Reid grew up outside of Washington, D.C., and in the 4th grade began playing cello at her elementary school in Silver Spring, Maryland. Reid attended a French immersion school, but spoke very little French; she attributes much of her early enthusiasm for cello to the allowance of English in music class. Reid could not afford additional cello instruction until high school: she briefly attended the Duke Ellington School of the Arts before dropping out due to the high cost of out-of-state enrollment, but assistance for low-income students enabled her to study at Levine School of Music in D.C.

After high school, Reid began studying classical music at the University of Maryland, where she reconnected with Saïs Kamalidiin, a professor she had met at the Duke Ellington School. Reid primarily studied classical music, but Kamalidiin introduced her to jazz performance and improvisation. Reid also met Nicole Mitchell as an undergraduate, during a summer spent in Chicago; Mitchell became another close mentor in improvised music, and Reid went on to perform on over ten albums with her, many as part of Mitchell's Black Earth Ensemble and Black Earth Strings quartet. Reid continued to focus on classical music for the next several years after meeting Mitchell: she earned her Bachelor of Music in 2000, and then moved to Chicago, where she continued her studies in classical cello performance at DePaul University. She completed her Master of Music in 2002. After graduating, Reid began teaching at the University of Chicago Laboratory Schools, where she co-directed the string program for seven years.

== Career in jazz ==
Reid became increasingly involved in the jazz community after moving to Chicago, and in 2009 she decided to more fully commit to the genre by beginning coursework towards a Doctor of Musical Arts in Jazz Studies.

Later that year Reid played a show at The Hideout in a special version of Mike Reed's Loose Assembly, with the quintet of Reed, Reid, Greg Ward, Jason Adasiewicz, and Joshua Abrams joined by Roscoe Mitchell. A recording of the performance was later released as the album Empathetic Parts. In 2010 Reid was also appointed Treasurer of the Association for the Advancement of Creative Musicians and played the Umbria Jazz Festival as part of the AACM Great Black Music Ensemble.

In 2011, Reid left her job as orchestra director at the Lab School, choosing to instead focus on her career as a musician. New Braxton House released Trillium E, the first studio recording of an Anthony Braxton opera, featuring the Tri-Centric Orchestra, which Reid had joined for the recording. The following year she was awarded a residency at the University of Chicago's Washington Park Arts Incubator and released her first album with Hear In Now, a co-led trio with Mazz Swift and Silvia Bolognesi.

In 2013, Reid founded the Chicago Jazz String Summit (CJSS), an international festival of avant-garde string performances. After a three-year gap, starting in 2016 Reid has continued to organize the CJSS as an annual Chicago event during the first weekend of May, even though she moved to New York City for four years. Reid ran the 2020 and 2021 Chicago Jazz String Summits as online streamed events, via Chicago's Experimental Sound Studio's facilities, due to the COVID-19 pandemic.

The Chicago Tribune named Reid Chicagoan of the Year in Jazz at the end of a highly decorated 2015: Reid completed and released her first album of original works, the eponymous Tomeka Reid Quartet, and a co-led trio with Nicole Mitchell and Mike Reed released their self-titled debut, Artifacts. The Chicago Reader included the quartet release, with Tomas Fujiwara, Jason Roebke, and Mary Halvorson, as among the best albums of 2015 and the best Chicago albums of the decade. DownBeat said Artifacts "might be one of the most important AACM records in a generation". Both albums were included in the year's NPR Music Jazz Critics Poll. Reid performed with a quartet arranged by Roscoe Mitchell, a recording of which was released later that year as Celebrating Fred Anderson, and performed at the Chicago Jazz Festival, Hyde Park Jazz Festival, Pritzker Pavilion, Symphony Center, and Chicago Cultural Center.

In 2016, Reid performed with Anthony Braxton's "10+1tet" at Big Ears Festival in Knoxville, Tennessee and was the recipient of a 3Arts Award.

Reid received her Doctor of Musical Arts in Jazz Studies from the University of Illinois at Urbana–Champaign in 2017. Her year in releases included the Hear in Now trio's second record, Not Living in Fear, and Signaling, a duo album with Nick Mazzarella that was also included among the Chicago Reader's best Chicago albums of the decade. She was named 2017 "Chicago Jazz Hero" by the Jazz Journalists Association.

In 2018, Reid performed with the Chicago Composers Orchestra in premiering her first orchestral composition, and traveled to Ethiopia, where she studied the masenqo, an East African string instrument. She appeared on 2018 releases including a collective trio album with Dave Rempis and Joshua Abrams, titled Ithra; Geometry of Caves, by a quartet with Kyoko Kitamura, Taylor Ho Bynum, and Joe Morris; and on Makaya McCraven's Universal Beings.

In 2019, Reid was a Foundation for Contemporary Arts Grants to Artists recipient; the award assisted her in commuting between tour and work when she was notified in late August that she had received a fall appointment as Darius Milhaud Chair (visiting professor) in Music Composition at Mills College.

She was winner of the "Miscellaneous Instrument" category in the 2019 and 2020 DownBeat critics polls and is a 2021 United States Artists Fellow. In June 2020, the New York Times consulted Tomeka Reid, along with artists including Yo-Yo Ma, to offer suggestions for cello recordings that could make newcomers to the instrument "fall in love" with its sounds; Reid recommended a composition by Abdul Wadud.

In October 2022, Reid was awarded a prestigious MacArthur Fellowship. During 2022 she has been "Improviser in residence" for the city of Moers, Germany, in affiliation with the Moers [music] Festival. During the 2023–2024 academic year, Reid was a "visiting scholar" at the Hopkins Center for the Arts of Dartmouth College in New Hampshire, where she developed The Tomeka Reid Stringtet large ensemble.

== Personal life ==
In 2020, Reid moved back to Chicago, after having left for New York City circa 2016. As of 2024, Reid lives in Chicago with her husband David Brown, a professor of architecture at the University of Illinois at Chicago.

== Discography ==
=== As leader ===
- Hairy Who & the Chicago Imagists (Corbett vs. Dempsey, 2014) O.S.T. for the documentary of the same name by Leslie Buchbinder
- Tomeka Reid Quartet (Thirsty Ear, 2015)
- Tomeka Reid Quartet, Old New (Cuneiform, 2019)
- Tomeka Reid Quartet, 3+3 (Cuneiform, 2024)
- The Tomeka Reid Quartet, Dance! Skip! Hop! (Out of Your Head, 2026)

=== As co-leader ===
Artifacts (with Nicole Mitchell and Mike Reed)

- Artifacts (482 Music, 2015)
- ...and then there's this (Astral Spirits, 2021)

Reid / Isidora Edwards / Elisabeth Coudoux

- Reid/Edwards/Coudoux (Relative Pitch, 2024)

Alexander Hawkins & Reid

- Shards and Constellations (Intakt, 2020)

Hear in Now (with Mazz Swift and Silvia Bolognesi)

- Hear in Now (Rudi, 2012)
- Not Living in Fear (International Anthem, 2017)

The Hemphill Stringtet (with Curtis Stewart, Sam Bardfeld, Stephanie Griffin)

- Plays the Music of Julius Hemphill (Out of Your Head, 2025)

Reid / Kyoko Kitamura / Taylor Ho Bynum / Joe Morris

- Geometry of Caves (Relative Pitch, 2018)
- Geometry of Distance (Relative Pitch, 2019)
- Geometry of Trees (Relative Pitch, 2022)
- Geometry of Phenomena (Relative Pitch, 2024)

Reid & Fred Lonberg-Holm

- Eight Pieces for Two Cellos (Third Stream, 2022)

Reid & Nick Mazzarella

- Signaling (Nessa, 2017)

Joe McPhee & Reid

- Let Our Rejoicing Rise (Corbett vs. Dempsey, 2022)

Joe McPhee / Dave Rempis / Reid / Brandon Lopez / Paal Nilssen-Love

- Of Things Beyond Thule Vol. 1 (Aerophonic, 2020)
- Of Things Beyond Thule Vol. 2 (Aerophonic, 2020)

Reid / Filippo Monico

- The Mouser (Relative Pitch, 2019)

Reid & Joe Morris

- Combinations 2020 (RogueArt, 2020)

Angelika Niescier / Reid / Savannah Harris

- Beyond Dragons (Intakt, 2023)

Dave Rempis / Joe Morris / Reid / Jim Baker

- Nettles (Aerophonic, 2016)

Dave Rempis / Reid / Joshua Abrams

- Ithra (Aerophonic, 2018)
- Rempis / Reid / Abrams / Daisy / Damon, The Covid Tapes: Solos, Duos & Trios (Aerophonic, 2021), one trio track

Claudia Solal, Katherine Young, Reid, Benoît Delbecq

- Antichamber Music (The Bridge Sessions, 2019)

Craig Taborn / Tomeka Reid / Ches Smith

- Dream Archives (ECM, 2026)

The Urge Trio (with Christoph Erb and Keefe Jackson)

- Duope (Veto, 2013) plus Fred Lonberg-Holm (not as Urge Trio yet)
- Live in Toledo (Veto, 2013)
- Live at the Hungry Brain (recorded 2015, Veto, 2017)
- Heros – Live in St. Petersburg (rec. 2017, Veto, 2021)

Watershed (with Denis Fournier, Nicole Mitchell, Hanah Jon Taylor, Bernard Santacruz)

- Watershed (RogueArt, 2012)

=== As sideperson ===
with Jaimie Branch

- Fly or Die (International Anthem, 2017)
- Fly or Die II: Bird Dogs of Paradise (International Anthem, 2019)

with Anthony Braxton

- Trillium E (New Braxton House, 2011) with the Tri-Centric Orchestra
- Trillium J (New Braxton House, 2016) with Orchestra
- 10+1tet (Knoxville) (Braxton Bootleg, 2016)
- Anthony Braxton's Language Music (Sound American, 2016), solos, Reid plays "Language Music 9: Legato Formings"
- 12 Comp (ZIM) 2017 (Firehouse, 2021) with 12-piece orchestra

with Taylor Ho Bynum

- Enter the Plustet (Firehouse 12, 2016)
- Taylor Ho Bynum 9-tette, The Ambiguity Manifesto (Firehouse 12, 2019)

with Mats Gustafsson, Ken Vandermark plus Chad Taylor

- Pivot (Silkheart, 2025)

with Nicole Mitchell

- Afrika Rising (Dreamtime, 2002)
- Hope, Future and Destiny (Dreamtime, 2004)
- Black Unstoppable (Delmark, 2007)
- Renegades (Delmark, 2008)
- Xenogenesis Suite (Firehouse 12, 2008)
- Intergalactic Beings (FPE, 2014)
- Liberation Narratives (Black Earth Music, 2017)
- Mandorla Awakening II (FPE, 2017)
- Maroon Cloud (FPE, 2018)
- Mitchell and Lisa E. Harris, EarthSeed (FPE, 2020)

with Mike Reed's Loose Assembly

- Last Year's Ghost (482 Music, 2007)
- The Speed of Change (482 Music, 2008)
- Empathetic Parts (482 Music, 2010)

With others

- The AACM Great Black Music Ensemble, At Umbria Jazz 2009 (Musica Jazz, 2010)
- Joshua Abrams, Represencing (Eremite, 2012)
- Living by Lanterns (Jason Adasiewicz & Mike Reed), New Myth/Old Science (Cuneiform, 2012)
- All City Affairs (Peter Andreadis), Bees (Lujo, 2006)
- Jason Ajemian, From Beyond (Sundmagi, 2006)
- Dee Alexander, Sketches of Light (EGEA, 2012)
- Dee Alexander, Songs My Mother Loves (Blujazz, 2014)
- Art Ensemble of Chicago, We Are on the Edge (Pi, 2019)
- Art Ensemble of Chicago, The Sixth Decade: From Paris to Paris (RogueArt, 2023)
- Baby Teeth, The Simp (Lujo, 2007)
- Birthmark, Antibodies (Polyvinyl, 2012)
- Silvia Bolognesi, Chicago Sessions (Fonterossa, 2015)
- Bronze, Calypso Shakedown (Unsound, 2009)
- James Brandon Lewis/Red Lily, Calling Antonin (TAO Forms;2026)
- Jeremy Cunningham, The Weather Up There (Northern Spy, 2020)
- Dave Douglas, Engage (Greenleaf, 2019)
- James Elkington, Wintres Woma (Paradise of Bachelors, 2017)
- Kahil El'Zabar, Kahil El’Zabar's America the Beautiful (Spiritmuse, 2020)
- Tomas Fujiwara's 7 Poets Trio, 7 Poets Trio (RogueArt, 2019)
- Tomas Fujiwara's 7 Poets Trio, Pith (Out of Your Heads, 2023)
- Theaster Gates, One (IHME, 2017)
- Giddy Motors, Make It Pop (FatCat, 2002)
- Hecuba, Paradise (Manimal Vinyl, 2009)
- HiM, Peoples (After Hours, 2005)
- Devin Hoff, The Lost Songs of Lemuria (self-released, 2013)
- Luz, Polemonta (Auand, 2014)
- Man Man, Rabbit Habits (Anti-, 2008)
- The Margots (Adrienne Pierluissi, Ken Vandermark, et al.), Pescado (Okka Disk, 2013)
- Rob Mazurek Quartet, Color Systems (RogueArt, 2024)
- Makaya McCraven, Universal Beings (International Anthem, 2018)
- Makaya McCraven, Universal Beings E&F Sides (International Anthem, 2020)
- Dave McDonnell Group, The Time Inside a Year (Delmark, 2015)
- Myra Melford's Fire and Water Quintet, For the Love of Fire and Water (Rogueart, 2023)
- Roscoe Mitchell & Nicole Mitchell, Three Compositions (RogueArt, 2012)
- Roscoe Mitchell, Celebrating Fred Anderson (Nessa, 2015)
- The National Trust, Kings & Queens (Thrill Jockey, 2006)
- Mankwe Ndosi & Body MemOri, Felt/Not Said (Auspice Now, 2021)
- OHMME, Parts (Joyful Noise, 2018)
- Owen, Ghost Town (Polyvinyl, 2011)
- Owen, L'Ami du Peuple (Polyvinyl, 2013)
- Junius Paul, Ism (International Anthem, 2019)
- Kristo Rodzevski, Bitter Almonds (Much Prefer, 2017)
- Savath & Savalas (Guillermo Scott Herren), Golden Pollen (Anti-, 2007)
- Third Coast Ensemble (Rob Mazurek, Christophe Rocher, et al.), Wrecks (RogueArt, 2017)
- TromBari (Glenn Wilson & Jim Pugh), The Devil's Hopyard (Jazzmaniac, 2012)
