= Bending Bridges =

Studio album by Mary Halvorson
- Released: May 8, 2012
- Genre: Jazz
- Length: 68:29
- Label: Firehouse 12

Professional ratings
Review scores
Source	Rating
PopMatters	8/10
Tiny Mix Tapes	3.5/5 stars

Bending Bridges is a studio album by jazz guitarist Mary Halvorson, the second with her working quintet, composed of saxophonist Jon Irabagon, trumpeter Jonathan Finlayson, bassist John Hebert and drummer Ches Smith. It was released in May 2012 under Firehouse 12 Records.

== Track list ==
All tracks are written by Mary Halvorson.

Bending Bridges track listing
No.	Title	Length
1.	"Sink When She Rounds the Bend"	7:48
2.	"Hemorrhaging Smiles"	7:58
3.	"Forgotten Men in Silver"	8:02
4.	"Love in Eight Colors"	10:14
5.	"The Periphery of Scandal"	7:50
6.	"That Old Sound"	4:49
7.	"Sea Cut Like Snow"	6:52
8.	"Deformed Weight of Hands"	7:08
9.	"All the Clocks"	7:48
