= Susan Alcorn =

American composer (1953–2025)

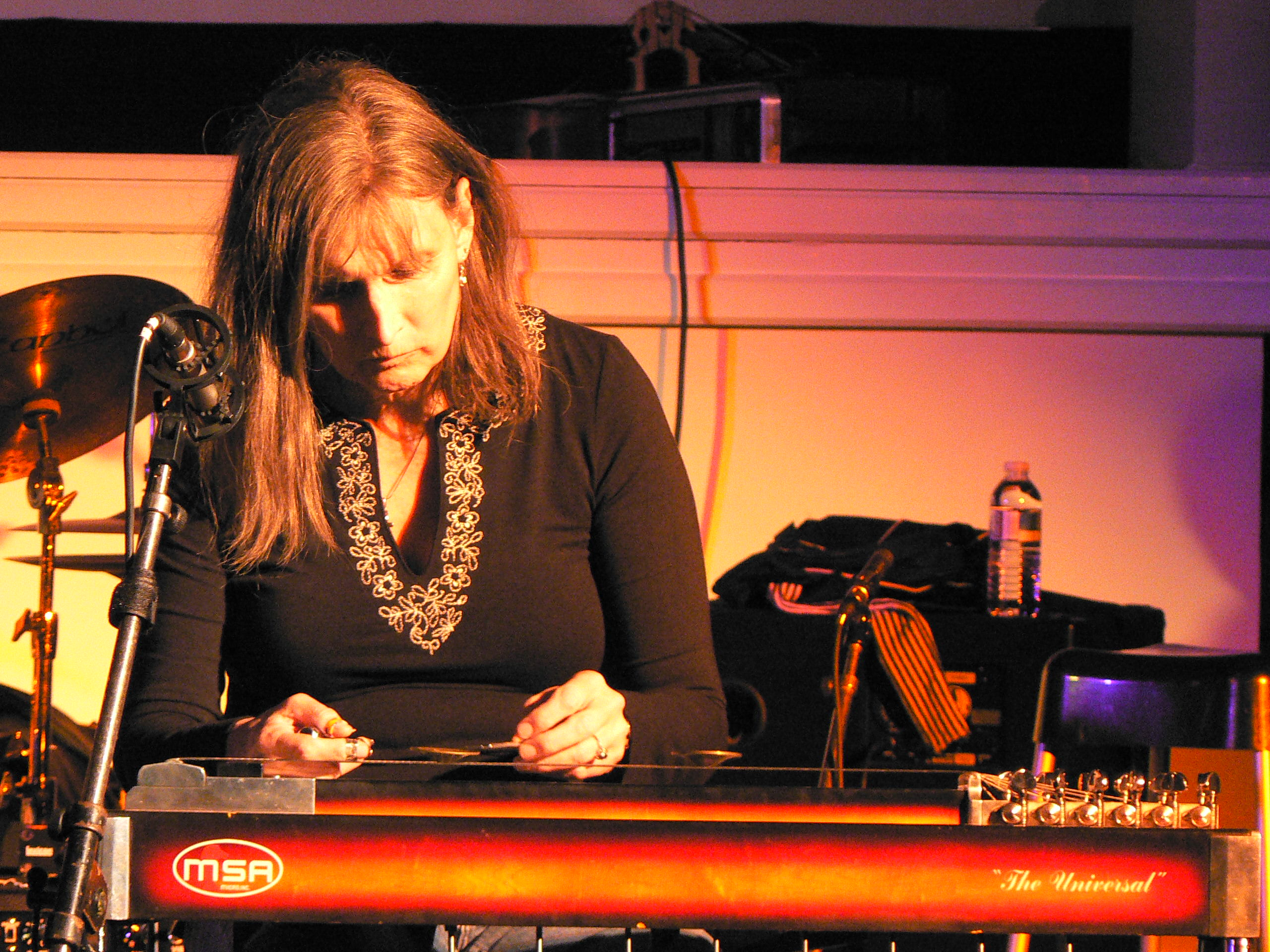
- Born: April 4, 1953; Cleveland, Ohio, U.S.
- Died: January 31, 2025 (aged 71); Baltimore, Maryland, U.S.
- Known for: Composer
- Spouse: David Lobato

Susan Alcorn (April 4, 1953 – January 31, 2025) was an American composer, improvisor, and pedal steel guitarist.

== Life and career ==
Born in Cleveland, Ohio, Alcorn started playing guitar at the age of twelve and quickly immersed herself in folk music, blues, and the pop music of the 1960s. A chance encounter with blues musician Muddy Waters steered her towards playing slide guitar. By the time she was 21, she had immersed herself in the pedal steel guitar, playing in country and western swing bands in Texas.

Soon, she began to combine the techniques of country-western pedal steel with her own extended techniques to form a personal style influenced by free jazz, avant-garde classical music, Indian ragas, Indigenous traditions, and various folk musics of the world. By the early 1990s her music began to show an influence of the holistic and feminist "deep listening" philosophies of Pauline Oliveros.

Though mostly a solo performer, Alcorn collaborated with numerous artists including Pauline Oliveros, Eugene Chadbourne, Peter Kowald, Chris Cutler, Joe Giardullo, Caroline Kraabel, Ingrid Laubrock, Le Quan Ninh, Josephine Foster, Joe McPhee, Vinny Golia and Ken Vandermark, LaDonna Smith, Mike Cooper, Walter Daniels, Ellen Fullman, Jandek, George Burt, Janel Leppin, Michael Formanek, Ellery Eskelin, Fred Frith, Maggie Nicols, Evan Parker, Johanna Varner, Zane Campbell, Mary Halvorson and Bill Embleton and the Severn Run Country Band.

She wrote on the subject of music for the UK magazine Resonance and CounterPunch. Her article "The Road the Radio, and the Full Moon" was included in "The Best Music Writing of 2006" published by Da Capo Press.

Alcorn lived in Houston, then Baltimore later in life. She was married to photographer David Lobato. Alcorn died of natural causes at her home in northeast Baltimore on January 31, 2025.

== Discography ==
- "Uma" (Loveletter 2000)
- "Curandera" (Uma Sounds 2005), "Concentration" (Recorded 2004)
- "And I Await the Resurrection of the Pedal Steel Guitar" (Olde English Spelling Bee 2007)
- "Touch This Moment" (Uma Sounds 2010)
- "Soledad" (Relative Pitch, 2015)
- "Evening Tales" (Mystra 2016).
- "Prism Mirror Lens" (with Phillip Greenlief, VG+ 2019)
- "Invitation to a Dream (with Joe McPhee and Ken Vandermark, Astral Spirits 2019)
- "Pedernal" (Susan Alcorn Quinet, Relative Pitch 2020)
- "Bird Meets Wire" (with Ingrid Laubrock, Leila Bordreuil, Relative Pitch 2020)
- "From Union Pool" (with Patrick Holmes and Ryan Sawyer, Relative Pitch 2022)
- "Manifesto" (with Hernâni Faustino and Jose Lencastre, Relative Pitch 2020)
- "Canto" (Septeto del Sur, Relative Pitch 2020)
- "Thollem / Susan Alcorn - Thollem's Astral Traveling Sessions" (Astral Spirits, 2021)
- "Filament" (with Catherine Sikora Mingus, Relative Pitch 2024)
- "In-Yun" (Longform Editions 2024)
- "Contra Madre" (with Nomad War Machine, VG+Records 2026)
