= Old New =

Studio album by Tomeka Reid Quartet
- Released: 2019
- Recorded: April 18, 2018
- Studio: Greenwood Underground, Brooklyn, New York
- Genre: Jazz
- Length: 46:04
- Label: Cuneiform; Rune 465
- Producer: Tomeka Reid

Tomeka Reid chronology
The Mouser (2019)	Old New (2019)	Geometry of Distance (2019)

Old New is an album by the Tomeka Reid Quartet, led by cellist and composer Tomeka Reid, and featuring guitarist Mary Halvorson, double bassist Jason Roebke, and drummer Tomas Fujiwara. The group's second release, it was recorded on April 18, 2018, at Greenwood Underground in Brooklyn, New York, and was issued in 2019 by Cuneiform Records.

== Reception ==
Professional ratings
Review scores
Source	Rating
All About Jazz	4/5 stars
AllMusic	4/5 stars
The Audio Beat	4/5 stars
Financial Times	4/5 stars
The Free Jazz Collective	4/5 stars
Tom Hull – on the Web	B+
The Vinyl District	A

In a review for AllMusic, Thom Jurek wrote: "Old New is a deeply satisfying listen, and a groundbreaking recording that displays a unique integration of post-bop and modern free jazz. This ensemble's communication is so comfortable that humor, warmth, and compelling harmonic and rhythmic ideas are rendered effortlessly."

J.D. Considine of DownBeat stated: "On Old New, [Reid] does a little bit of everything, from brisk bow work to plangent plucking, playing single-note lines, chords and squeaky bits of aural shrapnel... no matter how out-there the solos get, the music remains firmly rooted."

Writing for the Financial Times, Mike Hobart called the album "engrossing," noting Reid's "raw energy, slashes of bowed cello harmony and single note romance," and the contributions of her "vivid, mood-switching quartet." He commented: "As the album title suggests, new moves combine with well-established routines, and here Reid's compositions mix the two with the gritty imagination, sense of form and panache."

Point of Departure's Troy Collins stated that the musicians' "seasoned rapport enhances their interactions in this configuration, which is essentially a post-modern string band, where any player can assume melodic, harmonic, or rhythmic responsibilities." He remarked: "With its combination of historical antecedents, contemporary verve, and personal expression, Old New is a strong contender for best jazz album of the year. Reid and company have successfully avoided the sophomore slump and come out swinging. Highly recommended."

Writing for All About Jazz, Ian Patterson commented: "Intense yet lyrical, complex yet accessible in equal measure, Old New provides compelling proof of Reid's growing prominence among today's jazz/improvised vanguard."

Kevin Whitehead of The Audio Beat called the album "a worthy sequel" to the quartet's debut, and noted: "Soloing, Tomeka uses the hard plucky attack (and slightly pinched tone) jazz cellists often favor; it's all about the front of the note, its placement in time, the exact spot where the swinging gets done."

In an article for The Vinyl District, Joseph Neff wrote: "Although I'd say acceptance of the avant-garde is crucial to fully enjoy Old New, much of the record is inviting enough to please seasoned lovers of classic jazz... Reid has the equation fully worked out, and the results are fabulous."

A reviewer for Textura stated: "From start to finish, the Queens-based cellist demonstrates a gift for writing melodically enticing tunes that feel connected to long-standing jazz traditions yet also burst with the vitality that comes from bold thinking and fresh approaches."

Bandcamp Daily's Dave Sumner remarked: "There's nothing happenstance about the title of Tomeka Reid's latest. There's a kind of chronological elasticity that is pretty damn compelling... the foundations of blues and jazz and folk bleed through the music, giving it a strong sense of something traditional and familiar." BD reviewer Andy Beta noted that the album's "songs strike out in bold, lyrical directions, the three string instruments darting amongst one another like bees in a garden," and wrote: "Old New was recorded with the group playing in the same room, approaching it like a live set, that spontaneous energy remains intact on the album."

A writer for JazzIz described the cello as "an essential vehicle for unfettered jazz exploration" in Reid's hands, and commented: "Old New... exemplifies why she's quickly become a definitive figure on the 21st century jazz scene. As a composer, arranger, improviser, bandleader, and impresario, she embodies jazz's progressive ethos."

Jack McKeon of The Free Jazz Collective called the album "a project of bifurcations and a celebration of unity," and wrote: "It embraces tradition and charts new territories, often at the same time. Though each player does embark on various tonal and rhythmic excursions, the listener may be struck by the centeredness of Old New. This core, built by the quartet's locked-in performance, is able to achieve musical totality while attending to the minuscule tonal investigations of Reid and Halvorson."

== Track listing ==
Composed by Tomeka Reid.

1. "Old New" – 4:06
2. "Wabash Blues" – 4:56
3. "Niki's Bop" – 4:56
4. "Aug. 6" – 5:22
5. "Ballad" – 4:53
6. "Saddie" – 5:14
7. "Edelin" – 6:34
8. "Peripatetic" – 4:23
9. "RN" – 5:29

== Personnel ==
- Tomeka Reid – cello
- Mary Halvorson – guitar
- Jason Roebke – double bass
- Tomas Fujiwara – drums
