= Before There Was Sound =

Studio album by Roscoe Mitchell
- Released: 2011
- Recorded: 1965
- Studio: Station WUCB, Chicago
- Genre: Jazz
- Length: 52:40
- Label: Nessa
- Producer: Chuck Nessa

Roscoe Mitchell chronology
Before There Was Sound (2011)	Sound (1966)

Before There Was Sound is an album by American jazz saxophonist Roscoe Mitchell recorded in 1965 but not issued until 2011 by Nessa Records. The album presents the earliest recordings available of the work of the AACM, taped shortly after the first meeting of the organization in May 1965 and approximately a year before Mitchell's debut album Sound. This quartet, with trumpeter Fred Berry, bassist Malachi Favors and drummer Alvin Fielder, had been working together for close to a year before they gathered at the instigation of Fielder in the studio of WUCB radio station. "Mr. Freddy" is dedicated to the trumpeter. "Jo Jar" is for Joseph Jarman.

== Reception ==
Professional ratings
Review scores
Source	Rating
Down Beat	4/5 stars

The Down Beat review by Peter Margasak states "This is incredible, rigorously rehearsed and researched music made only less radical by what followed it—but in 1965 this would have blown minds." In an article for the Chicago Reader, Margasak wrote: "Before There Was Sound isn't as groundbreaking as what followed... but the band was already blazing its own trail."

Writing for Point of Departure, John Litweiler commented: "Here's one to gladden the heart, a CD full of song, swing, youth, energy, creativity... I've been looking forward to hearing this music for a long time, for its historical importance. I see now that it's even more important musically."

== Track listing ==
All compositions by Roscoe Mitchell except as indicated

1. "Mr. Freddy" - 6:26
2. "Green" (Fred Berry) - 3:08
3. "Outer Space" - 12:11
4. "Carefree" - 6:28
5. "Akhenaten" (Malachi Favors) - 7:43
6. "And There was Peace" - 7:01
7. "Jo Jar" - 5:07
8. "Carefree #2" - 4:36

== Personnel ==
- Roscoe Mitchell - alto sax
- Fred Berry - trumpet, flugelhorn
- Malachi Favors - bass
- Alvin Fielder - drums
