= Yayoi Ikawa =

Japaneae jazz pianist and composer

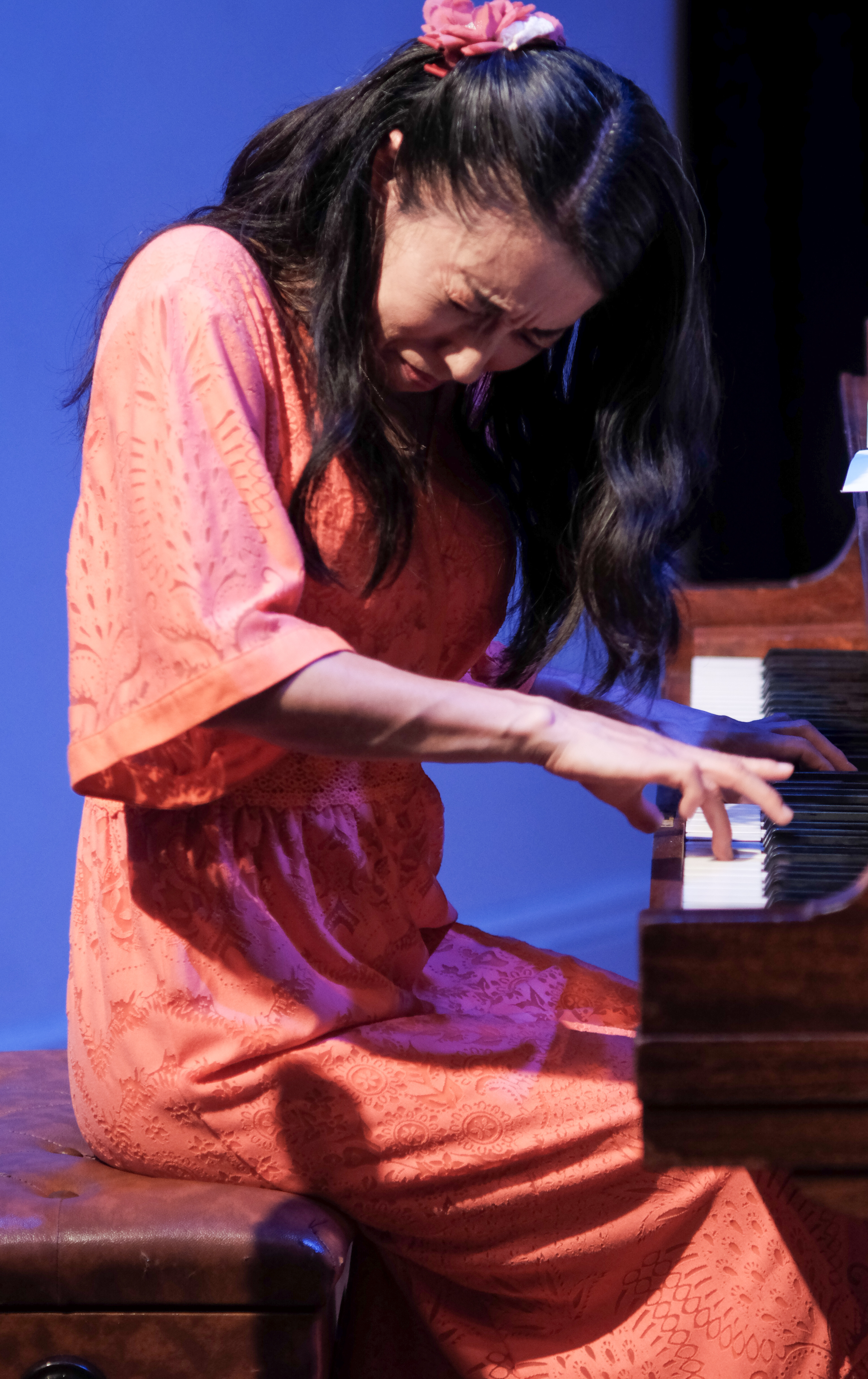
- Ikawa in 2019 at The Cell Theater, New York City

Background information
- Genres: Jazz
- Occupations: Musician, Composer, Educator
- Instruments: Piano, Keyboards
- Years active: 2003 – Present
- Website: https://www.yayoiikawa.net

Yayoi Ikawa is a Japanese-born jazz pianist, composer, and educator based in New York City.

== Early life and education ==
Ikawa was born in Tokyo and raised in Chiba, Japan, and began playing her grandfather's (a music teacher) piano at age three. She had formal classical piano lessons throughout her childhood. At age fifteen, her American host family, who were musicians, introduced her to jazz music upon her first visit to the United States as an exchange student.

She returned to Japan and attended the International Christian University in Tokyo, where she was a member of the jazz band and earned a Bachelor’s Degree in International Studies. Ikawa moved to New York City in 1999 and began attending jam sessions regularly, leading to an audition and acceptance into the New School of Jazz , where Ikawa studied with her primary musical mentor, Reggie Workman, and private studies with Geri Allen.

After receiving the Henry and Gill Block Scholarship and completing her studies at the New School, Ikawa performed at jazz festivals in Italy and Slovenia under the guidance of Reggie Workman.

Ikawa attended New York University and while working toward a Master's degree in music, she composed an orchestral work for an animated short film by Yusuke Murakami entitled If I were an Atomic Bomb, which was premiered at the Lincoln Center in 2007.

== Career ==
Ikawa's debut recording as a leader, entitled Angel Eyes, was a trio date produced by jazz drummer Carl Allen for the Nippon Crown record label and released in 2004. Ikawa's second recording as a leader, Color of Dreams, also a trio recording, was released in 2005.

Ikawa founded the Bridge Project in 2008, an international musician collective. Its primary goal has been to unite musicians, providing an opportunity to share a musical dialogue in a creative and exploratory musical environment. Since its inception, Yayoi's Bridge Project has performed at Jazz Festivals and Concerts throughout the United States, Europe, Asia, the Caribbean, South Africa, and Central and South America.

As a band leader, Ikawa has led a piano trio and larger ensembles at concerts in Los Angeles, North Carolina, The Blues Alley in Washington, DC, as well as New York City venues including Klavierhaus, The Kitano, Cell Theatre, Caffè Lena, Zinc Bar, Clement's Place, Knickerbocker, Five Spot and Soapbox Gallery

Ikawa has served as music director at the First Baptist Church in Piscataway, New Jersey, and was an adjunct piano instructor and lecturer at City College of New York and Brooklyn College (2018–20).

=== Collaborations ===
Although primarily a jazz artist, Ikawa has worked in a variety of musical genres and has performed or recorded with Reggie Workman, Emeline Michel, Howard Johnson, Lonnie Plaxico, Teo Macero, Craig Harris, Michael Carvin, Frank Lacy, Imani Uzuri, Tyshawn Sorey, Carla Cook, and Richard Bona.

== Discography ==
As a leader
Release year	Title	Label	Personnel
2004	Angel Eyes	Nippon Crown	Yayoi Ikawa (Piano), Renee Cruz (Bass), Kim Thompson (Drums)
2005	Color of Dreams	YIM	Yayoi Ikawa (Piano) Jim Robertson (Bass) Tyshawn Sorey(Drums)

As a sidewoman
Release year	Artist	Title	Label
2004	Ulrich Krieger	The Marvellous Aphorisms of Gavin Bryars	Mode
2004	Igor Bezget	Statements	Sensor
2004	Jeremy Powell	Leaving	Mayhem
2007	Dexter Porter	Crazy She Calls Me	Verdict
2007	Beaty Brothers	Band B3	Beaty Music
2007	Teo Macero	Study In Contrast	Teo Productions
2008	Billy Fox	Kaidan Suite	Gozen Reiji
2009	Jon Crowley	Connections	Jcrowl
2010	Jonathan Powell	Transcend	CD Baby
2012	Daniel Bernard Roumain/Laurelyn Dossett	The Collide	DBR
2015	Michael Carvin	Flash Forward	Motema
2018	Salim Washington/Brian Willson	You Dig ?!?	Double Music
2021	Mark Isham/Craig Harris	Judas And The Black Messiah	Watertower Music
2022	Craig Harris	Managing The Mask	Aquastra Music
2023	Matt Kane	Song Poems	Bounce Step Records
2024	Lonnie Plaxico	Radiance	Plaxmusic
2024	Matt Steckler	Old Friends Beckoned, New Sounds Reckoned	Skydeck Music
