= Nessa Records =

American jazz record label

- Founded: 1967
- Founder: Chuck Nessa
- Genre: Jazz
- Country of origin: U.S.
- Location: Buffalo, NY
- Official website: www.nessarecords.com

Nessa Records is an American jazz record label founded in Chicago in 1967 by producer Chuck Nessa.

After working at Delmark Records for a year, Nessa started the label at the urging of Roscoe Mitchell and Lester Bowie. The first album was released under Bowie's name because Mitchell was under contract to Delmark. Since the mid 80's the label has been based in Whitehall, Michigan.

== Discography ==
- n-1 Lester Bowie - Numbers 1 & 2 (available in Art Ensemble Box – ncd-2500 and reissued complete as ncd-31/32)
- n-2 Roscoe Mitchell - Congliptious (available in Art Ensemble Box – ncd-2500 and reissued complete as ncd-2)
- n-3 Art Ensemble of Chicago - People in Sorrow
- n-4 Art Ensemble of Chicago - Les Stances a Sophie
- n-5 Roscoe Mitchell - Old/Quartet (available in Art Ensemble Box – ncd-2500)
- n-6 Von Freeman - Have No Fear (available as ncd-6 with 1 extra track)
- n-7 Warne Marsh - All Music (available as ncd-7 w/7 bonus tracks)
- n-8 Ben Webster - Did You Call? (rights have reverted to Ensayo-Spain)
- n-9/10 Roscoe Mitchell - Nonaah (available as ncd-9/10 w/5 bonus tracks)
- n-11 Von Freeman - Serenade & Blues (available as ncd-11 w/extra track)
- n-12 Air - Air Time (available as ncd-12)
- n-13 Lucky Thompson - Body & Soul (rights have reverted to Ensayo – Spain)
- n-14/15 Roscoe Mitchell - L-R-G / The Maze / S II Examples (available as ncd-14)
- n-16 Charles Tyler- Saga of the Outlaws (available as ncd-16)
- n-17/18 Spontaneous Music Ensemble, Bobby Bradford, John Stevens - Live Vols. 1 & 2 (available as ncd-17/18)
- n-19 Wadada Leo Smith - Spirit Catcher (available as ncd-19 w/extra track)
- n-20 Roscoe Mitchell - Snurdy McGurdy and Her Dancin' Shoes (available as ncd-20 HDCD encoded)
- n-21 Hal Russell - NRG Ensemble
- n-22 Eddie Johnson - Indian Summer (available on lp only)
- n-23 Fred Anderson - The Missing Link (available as ncd-23 w/extra track)
- n-24 Hal Russell/Mars Williams- Eftsoons (available on lp only)
- n-25 Hal Russell NRG Ensemble with Charles Tyler - Generation (CD)
- ncd-26 Wadada Leo Smith - Procession of the Great Ancestry (CD)
- ncd-27/28 Roscoe Mitchell - Old/Quartet Sessions
- ncd-29 Art Ensemble - Early Combinations (CD)
- ncd-30 Von Freeman - Vonski Speaks (CD)
- ncd-31/32 Lester Bowie - All the Numbers (expanded reissue of n-1)
- ncd-33 Anthony Braxton & John McDonough - 6 Duos (Wesleyan) 2006
- ncd-34 Roscoe Mitchell - Before There Was Sound (CD)
- ncd-35 Ira Sullivan - Circumstantial (CD)
- ncd-36 Bobby Bradford / Frode Gjerstad Quartet - Silver Cornet (CD)
- ncd-37 Roscoe Mitchell Quartet - Celebrating Fred Anderson (CD)
- ncd-38 Roscoe Mitchell With Yuganaut - Four Ways
- ncd-39 Nick Mazzarella & Tomeka Reid - Signaling
- ncd-40 Roscoe Mitchell - Ride the Wind
