= Mary Halvorson =

American jazz composer and guitarist (born 1980)

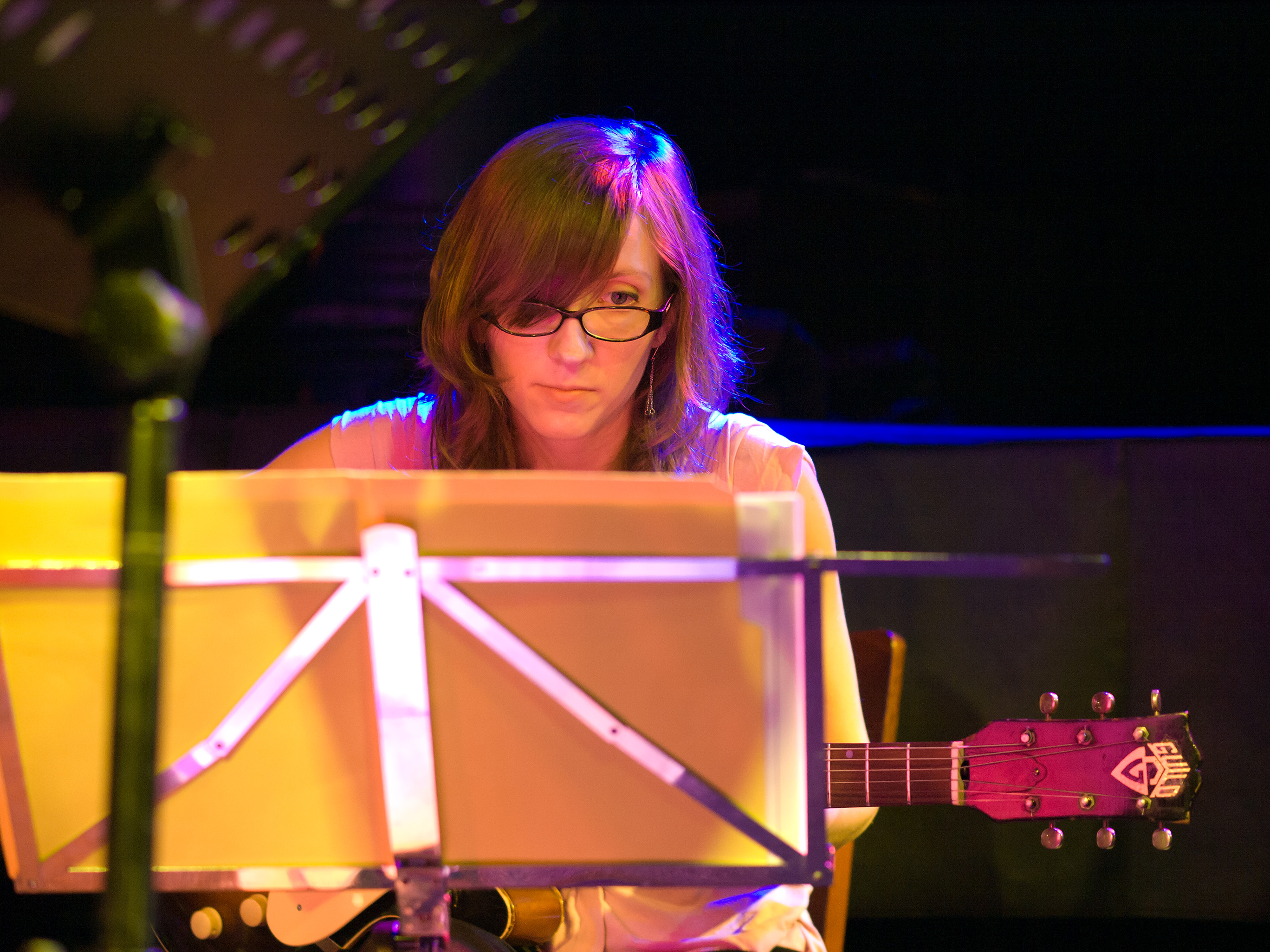
- Halvorson with Anti-House, Jazzclub Unterfahrt, Munich, Germany, January 2011

Background information
- Born: October 16, 1980 (age 46); Brookline, Massachusetts, U.S.
- Genres: Free jazz, Free improvisation avant-garde jazz, experimental flamenco, psychedelia
- Occupations: Composer, musician
- Instrument: Guitar
- Years active: 2002–present
- Labels: Firehouse 12, Thirsty Ear, Cuneiform, Nonesuch
- Website: www.maryhalvorson.com

Mary Halvorson (born October 16, 1980) is an American avant-garde jazz composer and guitarist from Brookline, Massachusetts.

Among her many collaborations, she has: led a trio with John Hébert and Ches Smith, and a quintet with the addition of Jon Irabagon and Jonathan Finlayson; recorded duo albums with violist Jessica Pavone; and recorded several albums with bassist Michael Formanek and drummer Tomas Fujiwara under the band name Thumbscrew.

In 2017, 2018 and 2019 Halvorson won Best Guitar in DownBeat's International Critics Poll. In 2019, she was awarded a MacArthur Fellowship.

Halvorson is on faculty at the School of Jazz (The New School).

== Early life and career ==
Halvorson began her musical education on violin but was enthralled with the idea of playing guitar after discovering Jimi Hendrix. She first picked up electric guitar at the age of 11 in seventh grade. Her first guitar teacher was Issi Rozen.

She initially enrolled in Wesleyan University to study biology, but dropped her prospective major after sitting in on one of saxophonist Anthony Braxton's music classes. She quickly connected with him and he enthusiastically encouraged her to find her own expression on guitar.

Halvorson's 2008 recording Dragon's Head was as the leader of a trio containing bassist John Hébert and drummer Ches Smith. Her later album, Saturn Sings, added saxophonist Jon Irabagon and trumpeter Jonathan Finlayson. In 2012, she played with trumpeter Peter Evans and drummer Weasel Walter on the trio album Mechanical Malfunction.

In 2013, the trio of Halvorson, bassist Michael Formanek, and drummer Tomas Fujiwara recorded the first of several albums as the band Thumbscrew. NPR called Halvorson's 2015 solo album Meltframe "category-exploding", and its 2015 Jazz Critics Poll named the record 7th-best of the year.

Her album Away With You features pedal steel player Susan Alcorn (later described in Something Else! as "the Mary Halvorson of the pedal steel guitar"), cellist Tomeka Reid and saxophonist Ingrid Laubrock. The album Code Girl was Halvorson's first attempt at writing lyrics for her original works, which are sung by Amirtha Kidambi and inspired by the songwriting of Robert Wyatt and Elliot Smith. The album also features drummer Tomas Fujiwara, bassist Michael Formanek and trumpeter Ambrose Akinmusire. The album received an 8.1 rating from a Pitchfork review, explaining, "The pleasure of this kind of text comes from the way it invites active listening as a means of interpretation." Code Girl is named after an offhand remark by Braxton, who used the phrase in conversation while on a European tour with Halvorson. Later, she settled on the phrase as an album title, because "at that point I'd written a lot of the lyrics... and they seemed a little bit coded and strange." Halvorson has also worked with John Dieterich of Deerhoof. Halvorson had previously performed some of her lyrics in collaboration with violinist Jessica Pavone, with whom she also recorded duo albums. As of 2018, Halvorson was an instructor at The New School's College of Performing Arts.

Halvorson won Best Guitar in DownBeat's International Critics Poll between 2017 and 2019. In 2019, she was awarded a MacArthur "Genius" Grant for music.

== Musical style ==
Although Halvorson is often categorized as a jazz guitarist, her music includes elements of many other genres, such as flamenco, rock, noise, and psychedelia. In speaking with PostGenre, Halvorson noted that she's "never really felt like I had to stick with a particular style or idea... From [Anthony Braxton], I learned that it was normal to take such a broad approach. You would respect traditions but at the same time, you would push the boundaries of those traditions. You would break the traditions apart and do whatever you wanted. That approach has always come naturally to me...". In a 2018 interview with Jazz Times, Halvorson described the guitar as a "neutral vessel", saying “The cool thing about the guitar is it’s not associated as much with a particular genre... it could be classical, it could be rock and roll, it could be jazz, it could be folk.”.

In 2012, Troy Collins of All About Jazz called Halvorson "the most impressive guitarist of her generation", and wrote, "The future of jazz guitar starts here." Jon Garelick of The Phoenix identified Halvorson's search for her own sound as a key component of her success as a musician and composer.

== Discography ==
=== As leader ===
List of albums as leader
Year recorded	Title	Label	Notes
2008	Dragon's Head	Firehouse 12	Trio, with John Hébert (bass), Ches Smith (drums)
2010	Saturn Sings	Firehouse 12	Quintet with Jonathan Finlayson, Jon Irabagon, John Hébert, and Ches Smith.
2012	Bending Bridges	Firehouse 12	Quintet with Jonathan Finlayson, Jon Irabagon, John Hébert, and Ches Smith.
2013	Illusionary Sea	Firehouse 12	Septet with Jonathan Finlayson, Jon Irabagon, Ingrid Laubrock, Jacob Garchik, John Hébert, and Ches Smith.
2013	Ghost Loop	EMI	Trio with John Hébert, and Ches Smith.
2014	Reverse Blue	Relative Pitch	Quartet with Chris Speed, Eivind Opsvik, Tomas Fujiwara
2015	Meltframe	Firehouse 12	Solo covers album.
2016	Away With You	Firehouse 12	Octet with Jonathan Finlayson, Jon Irabagon, Ingrid Laubrock, Jacob Garchik, Susan Alcorn, John Hébert, and Ches Smith.
2018	Code Girl	Firehouse 12	Most tracks quintet, with Ambrose Akinmusire (trumpet), Michael Formanek (bass), Tomas Fujiwara (drums), Amirtha Kidambi (vocals)
2020	Code Girl: Artlessly Falling	Firehouse 12	Most tracks sextet, with Adam O'Farrill (trumpet), Michael Formanek (bass), Tomas Fujiwara (drums), Amirtha Kidambi (vocals), Maria Grand (tenor sax, vocals); plus Robert Wyatt (vocals)
2022	Belladonna	Nonesuch	Quintet with Halvorson and the Mivos Quartet
2022	Amaryllis	Nonesuch	Sextet with Patricia Brennan, Nick Dunston, Thomas Fujiwara, Jacob Garchik, and Adam O'Farrill; augmented by the Mivos Quartet on three tracks
2024	Cloudward	Nonesuch	Sextet with Patricia Brennan, Nick Dunston, Thomas Fujiwara, Jacob Garchik, and Adam O'Farrill
2025	About Ghosts	Nonesuch	Sextet with Patricia Brennan, Nick Dunston, Thomas Fujiwara, Jacob Garchik, and Adam O'Farrill. Additional contributions from Immanuel Wilkins and Brian Settles.

=== Selected collaborations ===
List of selected collaborations
Year	Artist	Title	Label
2004	Trevor Dunn's trio-convulsant	Sister Phantom Owl Fish	Ipecac
2005	Mary Halvorson & Jessica Pavone	Prairies	Lucky Kitchen
2005	People (Mary Halvorson, Kevin Shea)	People	I & Ear
2007	Mary Halvorson & Jessica Pavone	On and Off	Skirl
2007	People	Misbegotten Man	I & Ear
2008	Mary Halvorson & Weasel Walter	Opulence	ugEXPLODE
2008	Mary Halvorson, Jessica Pavone, Devin Hoff, Ches Smith	Calling All Portraits	Skycap
2009	Mary Halvorson & Jessica Pavone	Thin Air	Thirsty Ear
2009	Mary Halvorson, Reuben Radding, Nate Wooley	Crackleknob	Hatology
2009	Weasel Walter / Mary Halvorson / Peter Evans	Mystery Meat	ugEXPLODE
2009	The Thirteenth Assembly (Bynum, Pavone, Fujiwara)	(un)sentimental	Important Records
2010	Tom Rainey Trio	Pool School	Clean Feed
2010	Tomas Fujiwara & The Hook Up	Actionspeak	482 Music
2011	Weasel Walter / Mary Halvorson / Peter Evans	Electric Fruit	Thirsty Ear
2011	Mary Halvorson & Weasel Walter	Ominous Telepathic Mayhem	ugEXPLODE
2011	Mary Halvorson & Jessica Pavone	Departure of Reason	Thirsty Ear
2011	The Thirteenth Assembly	Station Direct	Important Records
2012	Tom Rainey Trio	Camino Cielo Echo	Intakt
2012	Weasel Walter / Mary Halvorson / Peter Evans	Mechanical Malfunction	Thirsty Ear
2012	AYCH (Jim Hobbs, Mary Halvorson, Taylor Ho Bynum)	As the Crow Flies	Relative Pitch
2012	Ergo	If Not Inertia	Cuneiform
2012	Living by Lanterns	New Myth/Old Science	Cuneiform
2013	Secret Keeper (Stephan Crump & Mary Halvorson)	Super Eight	Intakt
2013	Kirk Knuffke, Mary Halvorson & Matt Wilson	Sifter	Relative Pitch
2013	Curtis Hasselbring	Number Stations	Cuneiform
2013	Joy Mega	Forever Is Something Inside You	New Atlantis Records
2013	Xiu Xiu	Nina	Graveface Records
2014	Mary Halvorson, Michael Formanek, Tomas Fujiwara	Thumbscrew	Cuneiform
2014	People	3xaWoman: The Misplaced Files	Telegraph Harp
2014	Illegal Crowns (Halvorson, Fujiwara, Delbecq, Bynum)	Illegal Crowns	RogueArt
2015	Secret Keeper	Emerge	Intakt
2015	Tom Rainey Trio	Hotel Grief	Intakt
2015	Tomeka Reid Quartet	Tomeka Reid Quartet	Thirsty Ear
2015	Marc Ribot	The Young Philadelphians: Live in Tokyo	Yellowbird
2016	Tomas Fujiwara, Ben Goldberg, Mary Halvorson	The Out Louds	Relative Pitch
2016	Thumbscrew	Convallaria	Cuneiform
2016	Mary Halvorson & Noël Akchoté	Mary Halvorson and Noël Akchoté	Noël Akchoté
2017	Sylvie Courvoisier & Mary Halvorson	Crop Circles	Relative Pitch
2017	Elliott Sharp with Marc Ribot, Mary Halvorson	Err Guitar	Intakt
2017	Mary Halvorson Quartet plays John Zorn's Masada Book Two	Book of Angels, Vol. 32 - Paimon	Tzadik
2018	Thumbscrew	Theirs	Cuneiform
2018	Thumbscrew	Ours	Cuneiform
2018	Mary Halvorson & Bill Frisell	The Maid With the Flaxen Hair	Tzadik
2018	Robbie Lee & Mary Halvorson	Seed Triangular	New Amsterdam
2018	Ingrid Laubrock	Contemporary Chaos Practices	Intakt
2018	Joe Morris & Mary Halvorson	Traversing Orbits	RogueArt
2018	Various Artists	A Day in the Life: Impressions of Pepper	Impulse Records
2018	Tomeka Reid Quartet	Old New	Cuneiform
2019	Tom Rainey Trio	Combobulated	Intakt
2019	Mary Halvorson / John Dieterich	a tangle of stars	New Amsterdam
2019	Michael Formanek Very Practical Trio	Even Better	Intakt
2020	Thumbscrew	The Anthony Braxton Project	Cuneiform
2021	Sylvie Courvoisier & Mary Halvorson	Searching for the Disappeared Hour	Pyroclastic
2021	Thumbscrew	Never Is Enough	Cuneiform
2022	Thumbscrew	Multicolored Midnight	Cuneiform
2025	John Zorn	The Bagatelles Vol. 1 - Mary Halvorson Quartet	Tzadik
2025	Sylvie Courvoisier & Mary Halvorson	Bone Bells	Pyroclastic
2026	Ambrose Akinmusire & Mary Halvorson	Slo-Mo Neon Luminate Hoverings	Nonesuch Records
