= The New York City Jazz Record =

American free monthly newspaper

The New York City Jazz Record is a New York City based monthly free newspaper about jazz music, including interviews, album releases, and a schedule of live jazz shows. It was launched in May 2002 by co-founders Laurence Donohue-Greene (Managing Editor) and Andrey Henkin (Editorial Director/Production Manager, who departed at the end of 2022) under the name AllAboutJazz-New York. The gazette's name change switched permanently to The New York City Jazz Record as of March 2011. It is available alongside other free newspapers in unlocked, street corner, vendor boxes throughout New York City (around Grand Central Terminal, along 34th Street, the Upper East Side on Madison Avenue, and around Lincoln Center kiosks) as well as in pdf form online at: https://nycjazzrecord.com.

Saxophonist Joe Lovano called it "Simply the hippest journal about jazz in New York that has ever been published."

It has been nominated on multiple occasions as "Best Jazz Periodical" by the Jazz Journalists Association (2006, 2007, 2009–2026).
