= Coin Coin Chapter Three: River Run Thee =

Studio album by Matana Roberts
- Released: February 2, 2015
- Recorded: June 3–5, 2014
- Studio: Hotel2Tango (Montreal, Canada)
- Genre: Electroacoustic; drone; free jazz
- Length: 45:35
- Label: Constellation

Matana Roberts chronology
Feldspar (2014)	Coin Coin Chapter Three: River Run Thee (2015)	Always (2015)

Coin Coin Chapter Three: River Run Thee (shortened as River Run Thee; stylized as COIN COIN Chapter Three: river run thee) is the seventh solo studio album by American jazz musician Matana Roberts. It was released via Constellation on February 2, 2015. The album is the third installment in the proposed 12-part Coin Coin album series, in which it was preceded by Mississippi Moonchile (2013) and followed by Memphis (2019). The series, named after Marie Thérèse Coincoin, is an exploration of African-American history, the Civil rights movement, the roots of American slavery, Roberts' familial ancestry, and more.

River Run Thee's instrumentation was performed by only Roberts. The album was recorded in Hotel2Tango in Montreal, Quebec, Canada. While Roberts mostly uses her voice and saxophone on the album, she also uses elements of spoken word, field recordings, drones, and effects pedals. River Run Thee includes various samples and quotations, including ones from a 1965 Malcolm X lecture, a homeless woman in Jackson, Mississippi, and "The Star-Spangled Banner".

River Run Thee received positive reviews from multiple publications, including Rolling Stone, Tiny Mix Tapes, Pitchfork, and AllMusic, and received mixed reviews from others, including Exclaim!. The album was ranked at number six on Pitchfork's list of "The Best Experimental Albums of 2015" and at number 15 on Rolling Stone's list of the "20 Best Avant Albums of 2015".

== Background ==
River Run Thee is the third chapter of Coin Coin, Matana Roberts' planned 12-part series, which began with Coin Coin Chapter One: Gens de Couleur Libres in 2011. The series is an exploration of American history and African-American history. It also documents Roberts' research into her familial ancestry, her sexuality, and her travel. Grayson Currin of Pitchfork wrote Coin Coin "seemed an audacious undertaking, an epic that would either put Roberts in rarified visionary company or find her struggling near anonymity".

Coin Coin touches on various topics in American and African-American history, including the roots of American slavery, the Reconstruction era, myth in the American Afrodiaspora, the Civil rights movement, and the current state of racism in the United States. The series' name was derived from Marie Thérèse Coincoin. The surname was also used as a nickname for Roberts by her parents. As of 2022, Roberts has released 4 chapters of Coin Coin. River Run Thee was preceded by Mississippi Moonchile (2013) and followed by Memphis (2019), the second and fourth chapters respectively.

== Recording and composition ==
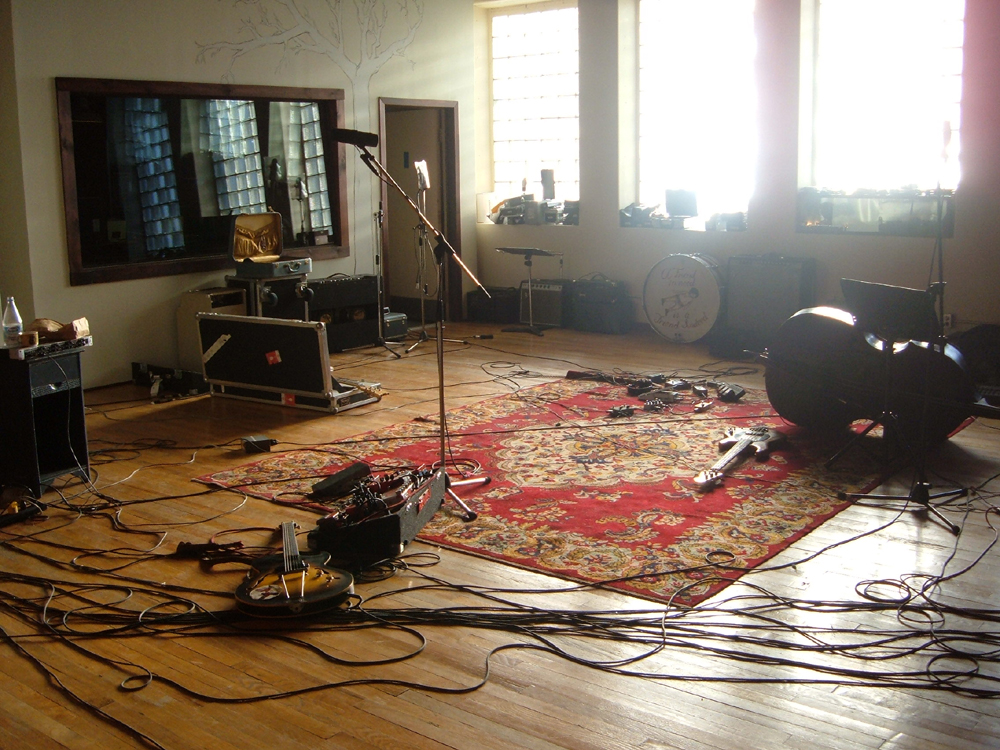
A room in Hotel2Tango, where the album was recorded

In comparison to previous installments in the series, River Run Thee's instrumentation was performed by only Roberts. It was described as the "most vast" of the series by Jake Cole of Spectrum Culture, and the "most layered and multifaceted" of the series by Jazz Scott of Tiny Mix Tapes . The album was recorded in Hotel2Tango in Montreal, Quebec, Canada, and recorded and mixed by Radwan Ghazi Moumneh. The album mostly uses voice and saxophone. According to Joseph Burnett of The Quietus, "without a band to work with, Roberts turns to electronics to bolster her singing and saxophone".

River Run Thee is an electroacoustic, drone, and free jazz album which contains elements of tape collage, spoken word, field recordings, drones, and effects pedals. The album includes: samples from a 1965 Malcolm X lecture, entitled "Confronting White Oppression"; readings from works by Captain G.L. Sullivan; and American nationalist and traditional songs, for example, "The Star-Spangled Banner". Roberts also used a recording of Gertrude, a homeless woman, from 2014.

== Critical reception ==
Professional ratings
Review scores
Source	Rating
AllMusic	4/5 stars
Consequence	B
Exclaim!	6/10
No Ripcord	6/10
Pitchfork	8.2/10
Spectrum Culture	4.5/5 stars
Spin	8/10
TheNeedleDrop	6/10
Tiny Mix Tapes	5 stars

On Pitchfork's list of "The Best Experimental Albums of 2015," by Marc Masters and Grayson Currin, River Run Thee placed sixth. Currin described the album as a "seamless collision of both her and the nation's past and present". Similarly, on a list of the "20 Best Avant Albums of 2015" by Christopher Weingarten of Rolling Stone, River Run Thee ranked fifteenth. Weingarten described the album as "a more austere outing composed on loop and effects pedals, Roberts culls dazzling swarms for voice, drone and her own impassioned alto sax solos".

Joseph Burnett of The Quietus called the album "harrowing", and praised Roberts for her vivid imagery and mournful singing. Burnett described it as a "broiling, uncompromising work that rips down genre barriers altogether". In a positive review, Currin wrote, "it's now clear that Roberts isn't just a storyteller, musician, ethnographer, historian, bandleader, arranger, improviser, or activist. She plays all of those roles". Nick Storring of Musicworks called it brilliant, and found its listening experience to be "utterly overwhelming".

Jazz Scott of Tiny Mix Tapes called the album "infinite and indispensable in its cultural worth and true-ly [sic] timeless and comprehensive in its scope". Lior Phillips of NPR praised the album for its cohesiveness and its historical roots, and used metaphors to describe it, including calling it a "forest", "womb", and "quilt". Phillips also wrote, "Roberts immerses herself and the listener in a history of anguish, and channels it all into a magnetic unity, a postmodern opus." Colin Joyce of Spin gave the album 8 out of 10 points and wrote, "free jazz has never been quite so free". Adam Kivel of Consequence said the album was the most personal so far of the series. Kivel also wrote, "[the album] is the most challenging entry in her massive undertaking, but a truth like this shouldn't be easy".

Anthony Fantano of TheNeedleDrop called the album a "stand-out record that boldly experimented," but criticized it for its "cold reading of historic documents," since this lacked the emotion of the previous installments in the series. Nilan Perera of Exclaim! enjoyed the denseness of the instrumental layers, but found that the unchanging soundscape made it harder to hear the words, "which seem to reveal little". Joseph Moore of No Ripcord related the album to the modern state of racism against Black Americans. Moore found the album an "exhausting" listen which listeners would find hard to finish.

== Track listing and credits ==
=== Track listing ===
No.	Title	Length
1.	"All is Written"	10:05
2.	"The Good Book Says"	2:39
3.	"Clothed to the Land, Worn by the Sea"	3:24
4.	"Dreamer of Dreams"	4:32
5.	"Always Say Your Name"	1:52
6.	"Nema, Nema, Nema"	4:19
7.	"A Single Man O' War"	2:05
8.	"As Years Roll By"	4:05
9.	"This Land Is Yours"	3:44
10.	"Come Away"	5:25
11.	"With Me Seek"	0:57
12.	"J.P."	2:23
Total length:		45:35

=== Personnel ===
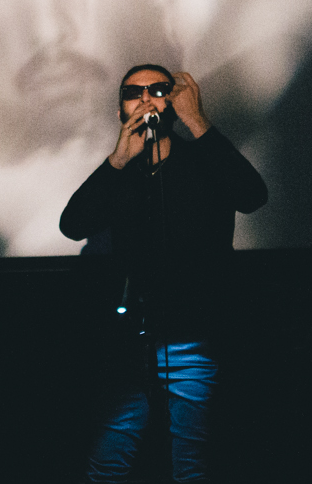
Radwan Ghazi Moumneh, who recorded and mixed the album, performing in 2017

Adapted from the album's listing on Constellation's website and liner notes.

- Matana Roberts – Alto saxophone, Korg Monotrons, "wordspeak", upright piano
- Radwan Ghazi Moumneh – recording and mixing
- Harris Newman – mastering
- W. M Jones Sr – additional lyrics

=== Samples ===
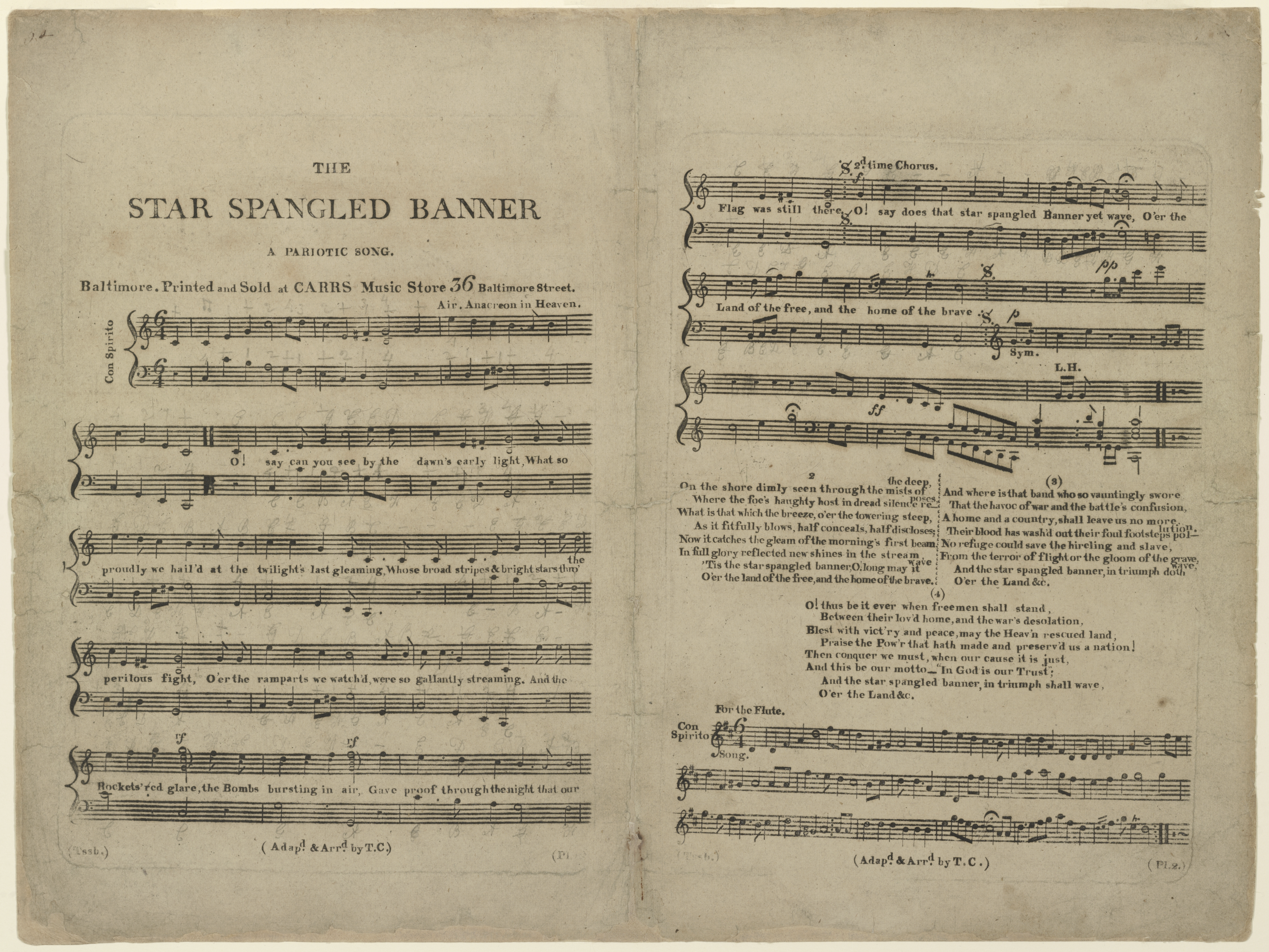
Sheet music for "The Star-Spangled Banner", which was sampled on the album.

List of samples, adapted from the album's listing on Constellation's website and liner notes.

==== Audio samples ====
- "Confronting White Oppression" by Malcolm X (February 14, 1965, Ford Auditorium, Detroit, Michigan)
- Gertrude (homeless woman, Jackson, Mississippi)
- "#southernsojourn2014" by Roberts (field recordings taken in Mississippi, Tennessee, Louisiana and New York City)

==== Quotations ====
- "Dhow Chasing in Zanzibar Waters" by Captain G.L. Sullivan (1873)
- "The Star-Spangled Banner" by Francis Scott Key
- "Beautiful Dreamer" by Stephen Foster
- "The Pledge of Allegiance" by the Mississippi State Senate
- "My Country Tis of Thee" by Samuel Francis Smith
- "Lift Every Voice and Sing" by James Weldon Johnson
- "All the Pretty Little Horses" (unknown origin)

== Release history ==
Release dates and formats for Coin Coin Chapter Three: River Run Thee
Region	Date	Format	Label	Catalog num.
Canada	February 2, 2015	LP	Constellation	CST110LP
Canada	February 2, 2015	CD	Constellation	CST110CD
