= Coin Coin Chapter Four: Memphis =

Studio album by Matana Roberts
- Released: October 18, 2019
- Studio: Breakglass Studio in Montreal, Canada
- Genre: Free jazz; American folk music
- Length: 46:45
- Label: Constellation
- Producer: Jace Lasek

Matana Roberts chronology
Always (2015)	Coin Coin Chapter Four: Memphis (2019)	The Truth (with Pat Thomas) (2020)

Coin Coin Chapter Four: Memphis (or simply just Memphis; sometimes stylized as COIN COIN Chapter Four: Memphis) is the ninth solo studio album by American jazz musician Matana Roberts. It was released via Constellation on October 18, 2019, as CST145. The album is the fourth installment in the proposed 12-part Coin Coin and was preceded by Coin Coin Chapter Three: River Run Thee (2015).

== Recording ==
Coin Coin Chapter Four: Memphis was recorded at Breakglass Studio, produced by Jace Lasek, with help from Dave Smith. The album was mixed at Hotel2Tango by Radwan Moumneh, and mastered at Grey Market by Harris Newman, with all locations being in Montreal, Canada. While Coin Coin Chapter Three: River Run Thee was created solely by Roberts, Memphis includes contributions from many musicians, most of whom contributing vocals. Roberts sings, performs spoken word, and plays the alto saxophone and clarinet.

== Themes ==
In Memphis and throughout the Coin Coin series, Roberts explores American and African-American history. Thom Jurek of AllMusic states the album "interrogates official accounts, slave narratives, her family's stories, and her identity as an African American woman." The album was based on a story told by Roberts' grandparents. In the story, a woman's mixed-race parents are murdered by the Ku Klux Klan and she escapes to live in the forest.

== Critical reception ==
Professional ratings
Aggregate scores
Source	Rating
Metacritic	91/100
Review scores
Source	Rating
AllMusic	4/5 stars
JazzTrail	A+
Pitchfork	8.3/10
Spectrum Culture	4.5/5 stars
Sputnikmusic	4.2/5

Coin Coin Chapter Four: Memphis received positive reviews from critics. The album scored a metascore of 91/100 on Metacritic, based on 4 reviews, indicating "universal acclaim".

Spectrum Culture's Evan Welsh noted "the way in which Roberts approaches identity touches upon the intimate and grand, the historical and folkloric" and expressed his excitement for the next 12 planned installments. Pitchfork's Mina Tavakoli provided historical context, saying "Matana Roberts ... saw how the tempo of history seemed to move irregularly through both her own memory and the national one". Both Thom Jurek of AllMusic and Winesburgohio of Sputnikmusic mention how the album is not an easy listen, "impossible" to listen to in the background.

In the conclusion of the review for Jazz Culture, the album was said to be, "Thoroughly narrated, revolutionary and liberating, this album speaks for itself, showcasing Matana at her highest level of creativity. In short: an essential listening."

== Track listing ==
Coin Coin Chapter Four: Memphis track listing
No.	Title	Length
1.	"Jewels of the Sky: Inscription"	1:48
2.	"As Far as the Eye Can See"	4:03
3.	"Trail of the Smiling Sphinx"	9:43
4.	"Piddling"	2:29
5.	"Shoes of Gold"	3:07
6.	"Wild Fire Bare"	5:41
7.	"Fit to Be Tied"	2:41
8.	"Her Mighty Waters Run"	4:57
9.	"All Things Beautiful"	2:30
10.	"In the Fold"	3:16
11.	"Raise Yourself Up"	2:44
12.	"Backbone Once More"	0:51
13.	"How Bright They Shine"	2:50
Total length:		46:45

== Personnel ==
- Matana Roberts – alto sax, clarinet, spoken word, vocals
- Hannah Marcus – electric guitar, nylon string guitar, fiddle, accordion, vocals
- Sam Shalabi – electric guitar, oud, vocals
- Nicolas Caloia – double bass, vocals
- Ryan Sawyer – drums, vibraphone, jaw harp, bells, vocals

=== Guests ===
- Steve Swell – trombone, vocals
- Ryan White – vibraphone
- Thierry Amar – vocals
- Nadia Moss – vocals
- Jessica Moss – vocals
- Ian Ilavsky – vocals
