= Isle of Canes =

2004 American historical novel

- Author: Elizabeth Shown Mills
- Language: English
- Publisher: Ancestry
- Publication date: 2004
- Dewey Decimal: 813.54
- LC Class: PS3613.I568 I85

Isle of Canes (2004) is an American historical novel by Elizabeth Shown Mills about the communities of Creoles of color and enslaved persons that lived there in the 18th and 19th centuries.

It was published by Ancestry, the book division of Ancestry.com.

This book follows an African family from their enslavement in 1735, through four generations of freedom in Creole Louisiana to effective re-subjugation by Jim Crow at the close of the nineteenth century. Mills explores the family's "struggle to find a place in [a] tightly defined world of black and white" — a world made more complex by the larger struggle of Louisiana's native ancien regime to preserve its culture amid the Anglo-Protestant "invasion" that followed the Louisiana Purchase of 1803. There was a struggle between the ethnic French and ethnic Americans (more British in background) for political and social hegemony.

Isle's central theme is the complex lives of those who escaped colonial slavery only to find they could not survive as free without complicity in the slave regime. Mills conducted research for this book for 35 years.

== About ==
The novel's subject-family is one that has been both romanticized and excoriated by journalists, academics, descendants, and current websites over the past half-century. Isle's interpretation of their controversial role of Creoles is based strongly on the author's original research across three decades in the archives of six nations. She reproduces some related documents throughout the novel. The author's research began in 1972 when she was employed by a preservation society to document the history of Melrose Plantation, one of the Isle's landmarks.

== Reception ==
Critical assessments of Isle of Canes focus on its overturning of stereotypes. Contemporary Lit describes the focus as "Gone with the Wind from a vastly different, more important perspective ... not that of the plantation owner or the poor white ... but homme de couleur libre and slave ... capturing the agonizing decisions which tore families and communities apart." Historical Novels Review similarly observes, "The Metoyers, a historical family both black and white and yet neither, challenge all perceptions of racial boundaries. You may never look at American History the same way again."

== Comparison with other novels on this topic ==
The Isle community is also the subject of Lalita Tademy's novel Cane River (2001). Mills's Isle explores the colonial roots of the community and the experience of slaves who achieved freedom prior to the Louisiana Purchase and a wave of Americans settling in the area 's Creole-Anglo conflict.

Tademy has said that she based her accounts of the earliest slave generations on published research by Mills and her daughter Rachal Mills Lennon. She portrays the mid-nineteenth– and early-twentieth-century experiences of the community's slave families. She suggests that they envied, respected, and resented the free status of the Isle's Creoles de couleur libre, especially as they shared ancestry and family relations.

Lyle Saxon also addressed this community in her historical novel Children of Strangers(1937). She depicts the state of servitude into which the Islanders were subjected by the early twentieth-century under Jim Crow, disenfranchisement and legal racial segregation. Saxon's era was one in which the chatelaine of the family's last remaining manor house (Melrose Plantation, a National Historic Landmark since 1976) was an Anglo patroness of the arts. She encouraged Saxon to visit and "observe" the community first hand. Saxon's portrayal captures the mindset of that era's white population. They vacillated between economic exploitation of the Islanders of color, sexual attraction to their women, and a paternalistic view of the multiracial Creoles as "simple people, but our people."

Historians struggle to understand the complexities of the "Peculiar Institution"—particularly the motivation that compelled a significant number of freed American slaves to purchase other humans once free to do so.

Edward P. Jones lays out one psychological path in his novel The Known World (2003). He creates a fictional anti-hero, the Black Virginian Henry Townsend, who is consumed by his self-centered ambition.

Isle of Canes reconstructs the world of a historic family to define a radically different but equally uncomfortable trajectory by which more than a few ex-slaves survived a status many historians consider "neither slave nor free."

== Major characters ==
=== Generation 1 ===
François and Fanny, the African artisan and chieftain's daughter, captured into slavery and brought to the wilds of Louisiana in 1735. He accepted their fate and insisted that she accept it, too.

=== Generation 2 ===
Coincoin ditte Marie Thérèse Metoyer, who swore over the dead bodies of her parents that one day their family would be free, rich, and proud. She kept her oath.

=== Generation 3 ===
Sieur Nicolas Augustin Metoyer, f.m.c., half-African and half-French, who hacked a cane brake from the wilderness then ruled over the Isle of Canes as patriarch of a legendary colony of creoles de couleur. They lived in pillared homes, yet toiled beside the 500 slaves who tilled their 18,000 acres (73 km²).

=== Generation 4 ===
Perine (Mme. François Gassion) Metoyer Metoyer Dupré, who was born to riches but aged in shame. She never forgot the heritage of her family or the brutality that destroyed it. Through the persecutions of Louisiana's Creole-Anglo conflicts and Reconstruction-era Jim Crow, hers was a different vow: Never would she allow her family to forget who they were until they could reclaim their Isle. She, too, kept her promise.

== See also ==
- Cane River
- Marie Thérèse Metoyer
- Melrose Plantation
- St. Augustine Parish (Isle Brevelle) Church
