= The Truth (Matana Roberts and Pat Thomas album) =

Live album by Matana Roberts and Pat Thomas
- Released: 2020
- Recorded: December 8, 2018
- Venue: Cafe Oto, London
- Genre: Free jazz
- Length: 37:01
- Label: Otoroku; ROKU024

Matana Roberts chronology
Coin Coin Chapter Four: Memphis (2019)	The Truth (2020)	Coin Coin Chapter Five: In the Garden (2023)

The Truth is a live album by saxophonist Matana Roberts and pianist Pat Thomas. Consisting of four improvised tracks, it was recorded on December 8, 2018, at Cafe Oto in London, and was released on vinyl in 2020 by the Otoroku label.

== Reception ==
Professional ratings
Review scores
Source	Rating
Tom Hull – on the Web	B+

In an article for The Quietus, Peter Margasak noted the musicians' "sympathetic connection, with the reedist's innate lyricism blending beautifully with the keyboardist's more outward bound machinations," and stated: "their quicksilver adoptions of a quickly morphing sonic landscape keeps listeners on their edge of their seats... There's nothing tentative or unsure about their spontaneous dialogues, which pulsate with a real sense of community."

Phil Freeman of Stereogum called the album "terrific," noting that, at times, Thomas and Roberts "sound like Cecil Taylor and Jimmy Lyons, creative partners for more than 25 years." He commented: "Roberts and Thomas absolutely have their own individual and collective languages... this is a fascinating and thrilling encounter."

Writing for Point of Departure, David Grundy and Gabriel Bristow remarked: "Roberts and Thomas both will let a melodic statement ring out, consider it, repeat it, then develop in tandem. There's something suite-like about the music, despite its improvised nature, as they move in blocks of resonant mood and emotion... this is moving music, and an album you will listen to more than once."

Spectrum Culture's Jake Cole described the pair as "ideal dance partners for a duet," and wrote: "the two gel so well that the album could easily be pitched as a concise summary of either artist's career... the album could have come across as an attempt to match other seminal LP-length jazz classics, but there's never any sense that Roberts and Thomas are attempting to enter the canon, merely to do what jazz has always done: let one person leap out ahead to watch the other chart their own path to meet them."

A writer for Marlbank called the album "wonderful," and stated: "a key point is how two instrumentalists in the moment adapt their own vision to the other's not by submission but by comprehension and intuition, the two indistinguishable."

Anthony Osborne of A Jazz Noise included the album in his "2020 Picks," writing: "Two extraordinary musicians, alto sax and piano, just beautiful."

The Free Jazz Collective's Stef Gijssels commented: "the interaction is free in spirit, open-ended in their journey, but solidly anchored in jazz idioms... Roberts thrives by the interaction with Thomas, creating wonderful jubilant, playful, angry or moaning tunes, navigating with dexterity the sudden changes and new ideas in the pianist's approach, while managing to keep the continuity in her playing."

== Track listing ==
1. "Part 1" – 7:21
2. "Part 2" – 2:55
3. "Part 3" – 10:40
4. "Part 4" – 15:35

== Personnel ==
- Matana Roberts – saxophone
- Pat Thomas – piano
