= Coin Coin Chapter Five: In the Garden =

Studio album by Matana Roberts
- Released: September 29, 2023
- Studio: Bunker Studios, Brooklyn, New York
- Length: 58:06
- Label: Constellation
- Producer: Kyp Malone

Matana Roberts chronology
The Truth (with Pat Thomas) (2020)	Coin Coin Chapter Five: In the Garden (2023)

Coin Coin Chapter Five: In the Garden is the tenth solo studio album by American jazz saxophonist Matana Roberts. The album was released on September 29, 2023, by Constellation Records, and is the fifth in Roberts' ongoing Coin Coin album series. The album's narrative centers an ancestor of Roberts who died from an illegal abortion.

The album was recorded in Brooklyn, New York, and mixed and mastered in Montreal. It was produced by Kyp Malone, and featured a lineup including Malone, Mike Pride, Matt Lavelle, Stuart Bogie, and Darius Jones. It covers a variety of genres, including folk, post-rock, and multiple subgenres of jazz. The album was received positively by critics who praised its ambition and breadth of style.

== Release ==
Roberts first announced the album on June 14, 2023, for a September 29 release date by Constellation Records, and released the first three songs, "We Said", "Different Rings", and "Unbeknownst", as a suite. With the announcement, Roberts also released an essay in which they wrote:

There is something quite rancid going on in America right now, more so than any time I have seen... a growing cohort of ghoul-like humans who seem to think that your body does not belong to you. We have seen some of this before, we knew it was wrong, and we eradicated some of the issues. It wasn't perfect how we did it, but we did it. And yet, like a never-ending train wreck, here we are again. The lack of access to safe and legal abortion services disproportionately affects marginalized and low-income communities, who often lack the resources and support to obtain safe reproductive health care. Reproductive healthcare includes abortion...

This over-focus and policing of ovaried bodies are getting in the way of the number one killer of American children today: firearms. This bounce around being dangerously shouted from conservative rooftops about trans bodies is just an extension of this reproductive rights fight.

== Style and themes ==
In the Garden centers a story of an ancestor of Roberts who died during an illegal abortion. The narrative is more explicit than in past albums in the series, and is described as a character study.

The album blends a number of genres including folk, avant-garde jazz, free improvisation, post-bop, spoken word, noise, post-rock, hymns, free jazz, and chamber jazz. The variety of instruments is broader than past Roberts albums, including saxophones, violin, drums, and tin whistle.

A lyrical refrain, "My name is your name/Our name is their name/And we are named/We remember/They forget", is introduced in "Unbeknownst" and repeated throughout the album.

== Reception ==
Coin Coin Chapter Five: In the Garden ratings
Aggregate scores
Source	Rating
Metacritic	86/100
Review scores
Source	Rating
AllMusic	4.5/5 stars
DownBeat	4/5 stars
Mojo	4/5 stars
The Skinny	4/5 stars
Uncut	8/10

According to the review aggregator Metacritic, Coin Coin Chapter Five: In the Garden received "universal acclaim" based on a weighted average score of 86 out of 100 from 6 critic scores. AllMusic's Thom Jurek said the album's "collision of styles, genres, and individual and group voices are not only welcome, but essential to the process of Roberts engendering dialogue, celebrating difference, and communicating emotions, psychologies, and cultures, all testifying to the import and cultural and artistic achievement of [their] evolving project." The Skinny's Joe Creely said the album's "pieces as a whole feel fuller, and more ambitious than anything Roberts has done to date", and that it "marks another stunning development in a series that remains essential listening."

=== Year-end lists ===
Coin Coin Chapter Five: In the Garden on year-end lists
Publication	#	Ref.
Aquarium Drunkard	—N/a	
BrooklynVegan (Jazz Albums)	—N/a	
The Quietus	51	
The Wire	5	

== Track listing ==
All tracks are written by Matana Roberts. "But I Never Heard a Sound So Long" arranged by Roberts from "All the Pretty Little Horses".

Coin Coin Chapter Five: In the Garden track listing
No.	Title	Length
1.	"We Said"	3:30
2.	"Different Rings"	1:26
3.	"Unbeknownst"	4:44
4.	"Predestined Confessions"	4:47
5.	"How Prophetic"	2:56
6.	"A Caged Dance"	6:03
7.	"I Have Long Been Fascinated"	1:58
8.	"Enthralled Not by Her Curious Blend"	3:55
9.	"No Way Chastened"	1:16
10.	"But I Never Heard a Sound So Long"	1:17
11.	"The Promise"	3:19
12.	"Shake My Bones"	4:03
13.	"A(way) Is Not an Option"	5:55
14.	"For They Do Not Know"	6:55
15.	"Others Each"	1:21
16.	"...Ain't I. ...Your Mystery Is Our History"	4:41
Total length:		58:06

== Personnel ==
=== Musicians ===
- Matana Roberts – saxophone, horns, harmonica, auxiliary percussion, vocals, spoken word
- Mike Pride – drums, auxiliary percussion
- Matt Lavelle – alto clarinet, pocket trumpet, tin whistle, vocals
- Stuart Bogie – bass clarinet, clarinet, tin whistle, vocals
- Cory Smythe – piano, tin whistle, vocals
- Mazz Swift – violin, tin whistle, vocals
- Darius Jones – alto saxophone, tin whistle, vocals
- Ryan Sawyer – drums, auxiliary percussion, vocals
- Gitanjali Jain – vocals
- Kyp Malone – synthesizers

=== Technical ===
- Kyp Malone – producer
- Nolan Thies – recording engineer
- Radwan Ghazi Moumneh – mixing engineer
- Harris Newman – mastering engineer
- Matana Roberts – album artwork

=== Recording ===
- Recorded at Bunker Studios, Brooklyn
- Mixed at Hotel2Tango, Montreal
- Mastered at Grey Market, Montreal
