= Robert Mitchell (jazz pianist) =

English jazz musician (born 1971)

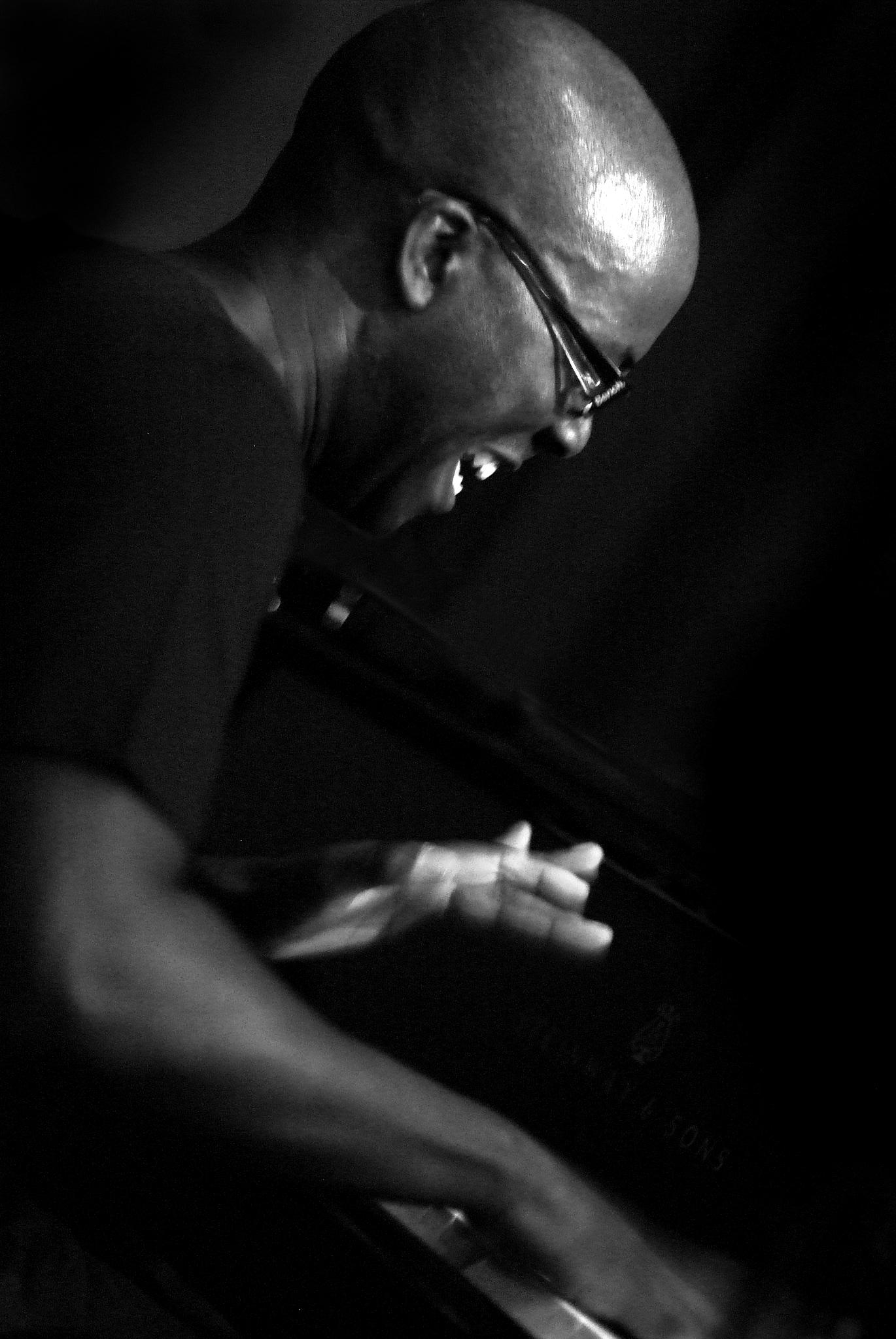
Mitchell performing live in October 2008

Robert Mitchell (born 1971) is an English jazz musician, composer and teacher.

== Biography ==
Born in Ilford, London, in 1971. As part of the F-IRE Collective, Robert won the Jazz on 3 Innovation Award at the 2004 BBC Jazz Awards; he has also been nominated twice: for Rising Star in 2002, and Best New Work in 2003. He has worked with Norma Winstone, Steve Coleman, Greg Osby, Courtney Pine, Steve Williamson, Iain Ballamy, Mark Wingfield, Jeremy Stacey, David Lyttle, Ty, 2 Banks of 4, and IG Culture, in addition to leading the 4/6-piece Panacea, his trio (with Richard Spaven and Tom Mason), performing in duo with Omar Puente (Bridges), and performing as a solo pianist.

Mitchell studied at City University and the Guildhall School of Music and Drama. Early band memberships included Tomorrow's Warriors and Gary Crosby's Nu Troop, plus award-winning bands Quite Sane and J-Life.

Panacea first performed in 2000, and have performed in the London Jazz Festival, Manchester Jazz Festival, Cheltenham Jazz Festival (Pillar Room), and the North Sea Jazz Festival (2006), and Vienne Jazz Festival (2008) and in such venues as the Pizza Express, Jazz Cafe, The Wardrobe, The Spin, The Spitz, Le Tavernier and Cargo. The group released its debut album Voyager on the Dune label in 2001. Its second album, Trust, was released on F-IRE in 2005. In March 2006, the band recorded a session for BBC Radio 1's Gilles Peterson Worldwide show. The band was subsequently nominated for Session Of The Year at the 2006 Gilles Peterson Worldwide Awards.

The duo with Cuban violinist Omar Puente began in 2003. The performance of this duo in the Havana International Jazz Festival (2004) resulted in a TV programme being made about the pair for Cuban TV (A TODO JAZZ 2005). The debut album Bridges was released in 2006 on F-IRE. They have also performed to great acclaim in Morocco and Belgium, as well as the UK.

Mitchell's solo album, Equinox, was originally a BBC Radio 3/Jerwood commission, and was released in 2007. It was nominated for Best Work at the BBC Jazz Awards (2003). It was launched at Lifting The Lid, a three-day celebration of modern solo jazz piano instigated, organised and curated by Mitchell. He has performed solo in Sweden, Belgium, Latvia and across the UK. He opened for Wayne Shorter in Brighton in 2003 (at the Dome), and Branford Marsalis in the same year (at the Barbican, London).

Robert Mitchell 3io grew out of the long-running band Panacea. It features Tom Mason (on bass) and Richard Spaven (on drums). After starting in around 2003/04, it released its debut album The Greater Good in late 2008 (33 Jazz Records/Jazz Services). The trio also tour the UK during the same period.

In September 2011 the album Embrace was released. Reviewing the album for the BBC, Kevin Le Gendre wrote: "Mitchell’s command of avant-garde and mainstream piano vocabulary is impeccable."

Mitchell is working with singer Jhelisa Anderson (cousin of Carleen Anderson), Dan Stern (saxophonist, clarinettist and composer), and Yolanda Charles (bassist and singer), among others.

Since 2003, Mitchell has been a visiting composer at the Royal Academy of Music Jazz Department. His education work has also included projects at WAC, City University London, Middlesex University, and as solo, ensemble teacher and examiner on the jazz course at the Royal Academy of Music.

== Discography ==
=== Solo ===
- Voyager (Dune, 2001)
- Trust (F-ire, 2005)
- Bridges (F-ire 2006) with Omar Puente
- Equinox (F-ire 2007)
- The Greater Good (33 Jazz/Jazz Services 2008)
- The Cusp (Edition, 2010)
- The Embrace (3io)
- The Glimpse (Whirlwind, 2013)

=== With other artists ===
- Magic of Olmec - Keith Waithe & The Macusi Players (Keda, 1997)
- Tomorrow's Warriors Presents...J-Life - J-Life (Dune, 1998)
- Journey into Beyond - Keith Waithe & The Macusi Players (Keda, 1999)
- The Sonic Language of Myth - Steve Coleman (BMG France, 1999)
- Back in the Day - Courtney Pine (Talkin' Loud, 2000)
- Child of Troubled Times - Quite Sane (Cool Hunter/Rykodisc, 2002)
- Sleeper Street - Mark Wingfield (Dark Energy, 2009)
- Live in London - Matana Roberts (Central Control, 2011)

== Filmography ==
- The Cat's Meow, directed by Peter Bogdanovich
