= Marie Thérèse Coincoin =

French-American planter and businesswoman

- Born: Coincoin; August 1742; Natchitoches Parish, Louisiana, New France
- Died: 1816 (aged 73–74)
- Other names: Coin-coin, Marie Thérèse dite Coincoin, Marie-Therese Metoyer, Marie Thérèse Metoyer, Marie Thérèse Métoyer
- Partner: Claude Thomas Pierre Métoyer

Marie Thérèse dite Coincoin, also known Marie Thérèse Métoyer (born Coincoin with no surname; August 1742 – 1816), was a planter, slave owner, and businesswoman at the colonial Louisiana outpost of Natchitoches, later known as Natchitoches Parish.

A Louisiana Creole of color, Coincoin was born into slavery. Her freedom was purchased in 1778 by Claude Thomas Pierre Métoyer, with whom she had a long liaison and ten children. She and her descendants established the historical community of Isle Brevelle of Créoles of color along the Cane River, including what is said to be the first church founded by free people of color for their own use, St. Augustine Parish Church, Natchez, Louisiana. The church is included as a notable site on the Louisiana African American Heritage Trail.

== Early life and family ==
Coincoin's family was enslaved by the Louisiana French Natchitoches post's founder and commandant, Chevalier Louis Juchereau de St. Denis. She was born as Coincoin in 1742 in Natchitoches (later known as Natchitoches Parish). Her parents were François and Marie Françoise, she was the fourth of eleven children.

As children, Coincoin and her sister Marie Louise ditte were trained in pharmacology and nursing. By these skills the women earned a livelihood after gaining freedom through manumission as adults. Their other nine siblings would remain enslaved at various colonial posts from Natchitoches to Pensacola.

== Slavery and freedom ==
When still young, Coincoin had five children. About 1765 her mistress granted Coincoin to live with the young French merchant, Claude Thomas Pierre Métoyer, Coincoin had gained the interest of Métoyer during his many visits to the St. Denis household.

The efforts of a parish priest to break up their union in 1778, by filing charges that threatened her being sold away to New Orleans, prompted Métoyer to buy and manumit her. Together they moved from the post, to outlying lands, where their liaison continued until 1788. As his mixed-race children matured and married, Métoyer manumitted the eldest five of the ten children whom he had held in slavery after he purchased Coincoin and their children.

== Business activity ==
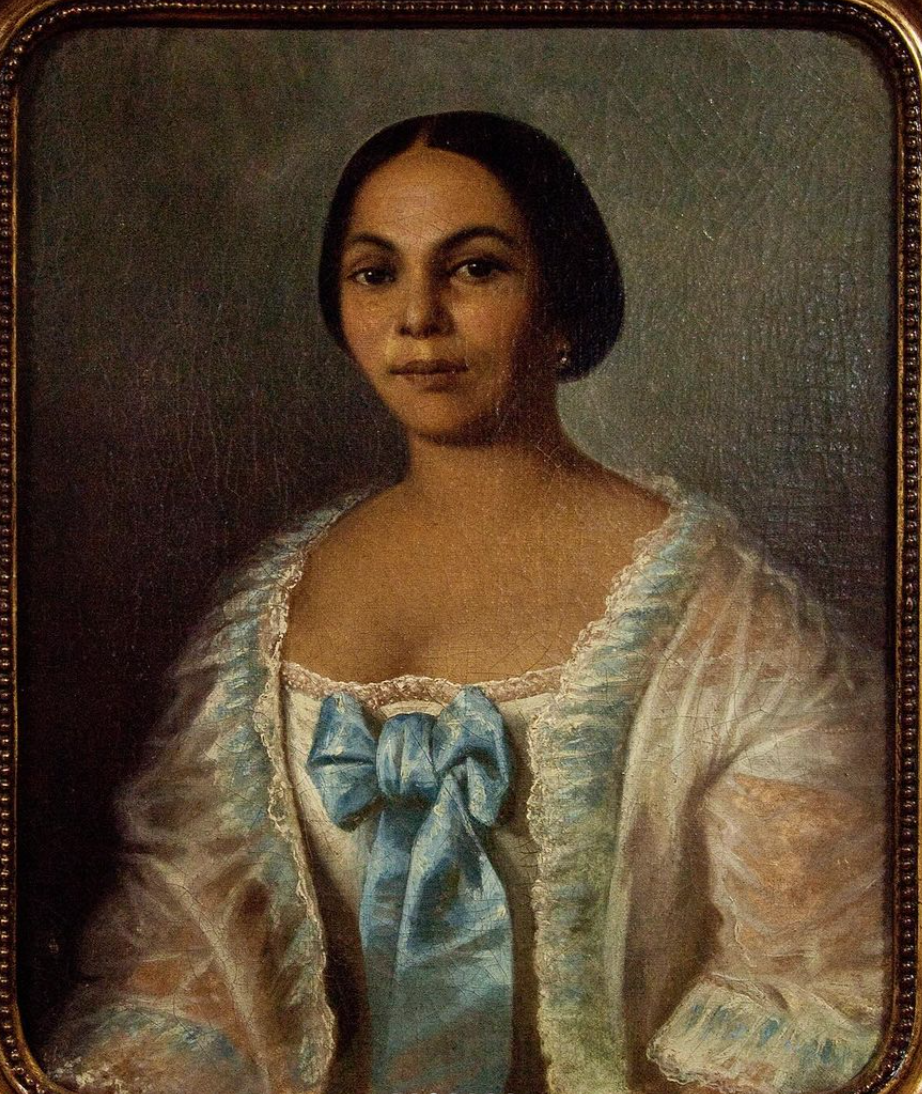
Marie Therese Carmelite Anty Metoyer Grand-daughter of Marie Thérèse Coincoin

As a free woman, Coincoin exploited a variety of economic enterprises. She manufactured medicine, planted tobacco, and trapped wild bears and turkeys, which were sent to the local market and shipping peltry and oil along with indigo that she sourced from the bear skins to New Orleans along with her cured tobacco. She became a landowner and a taxpayer. As a pious Catholic, she volunteered labor for the upkeep of the parish church. Like many other freed slaves in colonial Louisiana, she eventually acquired slaves in order to protect them from others in the parish purchasing them. Most were related to Coincoin or close friends, she labored alongside of them until her own health began to fail.

Some accounts state that she held one small farmstead of 67 acres. Other accounts show her as the owner of a plantation empire of 12,000 acres and a hundred slaves.

Surviving records document her ownership of somewhat over one thousand acres.

The liberal land-grant policies of the Spanish Crown provided a stake for her first farmstead on the Grand Coast of Red River (now Cane River), about ten miles below the town. That small tract of 80 arpents (67 acres), alluvial river-bottom land adjacent to Metoyer's plantation, was conceded by the local commandant in January 1787 and patented by the Crown in May 1794. It is identified on modern land maps as sections 18 and 89 of Township 8 North, Range 6 West.

On the heels of that patent, Coincoin applied for a significantly larger concession — 800 arpents of piney woods on Old River to the west of her farm — a tract identified today as section 55, Township 8 North, Range 7 West, where she established a vacherie (cattle range) and hired a Spaniard to operate it for her. In 1807, she bought a third tract of already developed farm land (the northern portion of sections 34 and 98, T8 North, Range 6 West).

That third holding, adjacent to her homestead, provided a stake for a younger son who had come of age after the Louisiana Purchase, too late to benefit from the more-liberal land policies of the Spanish regime. Coincoin has been credited with the founding of Cane River's fabled Melrose Plantation. However, this land has been documented as a grant to her son, Louis Métoyer, who built most of the surviving plantation buildings prior to his death.

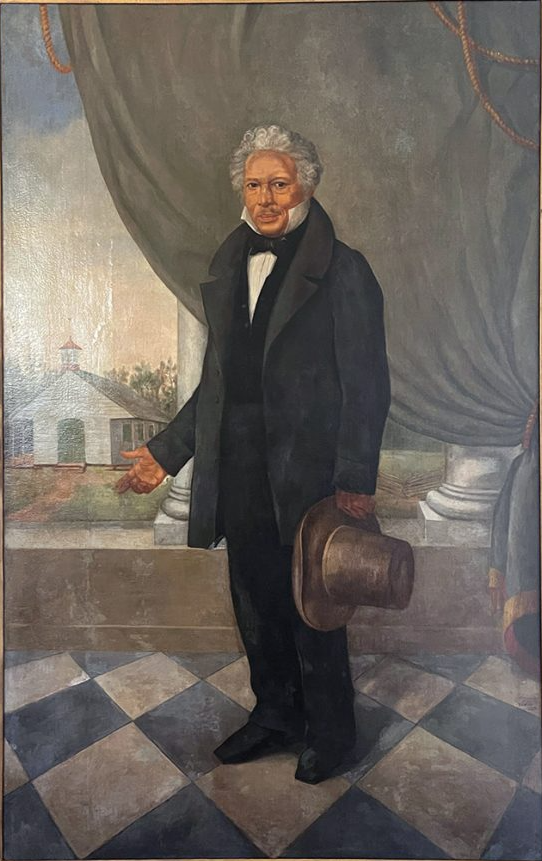
Nicholas Augustin Metoyer founder of St. Augustine Catholic Church and son of Marie

Coincoin lived frugally and served others, investing all her income into the purchase of freedom for the children from the slave marriage of her youth. By the time of her death, she had manumitted three of those children and three grandchildren. Another daughter and many grandchildren remained enslaved, as their owners refused to manumit or sell them.

== Legacy ==
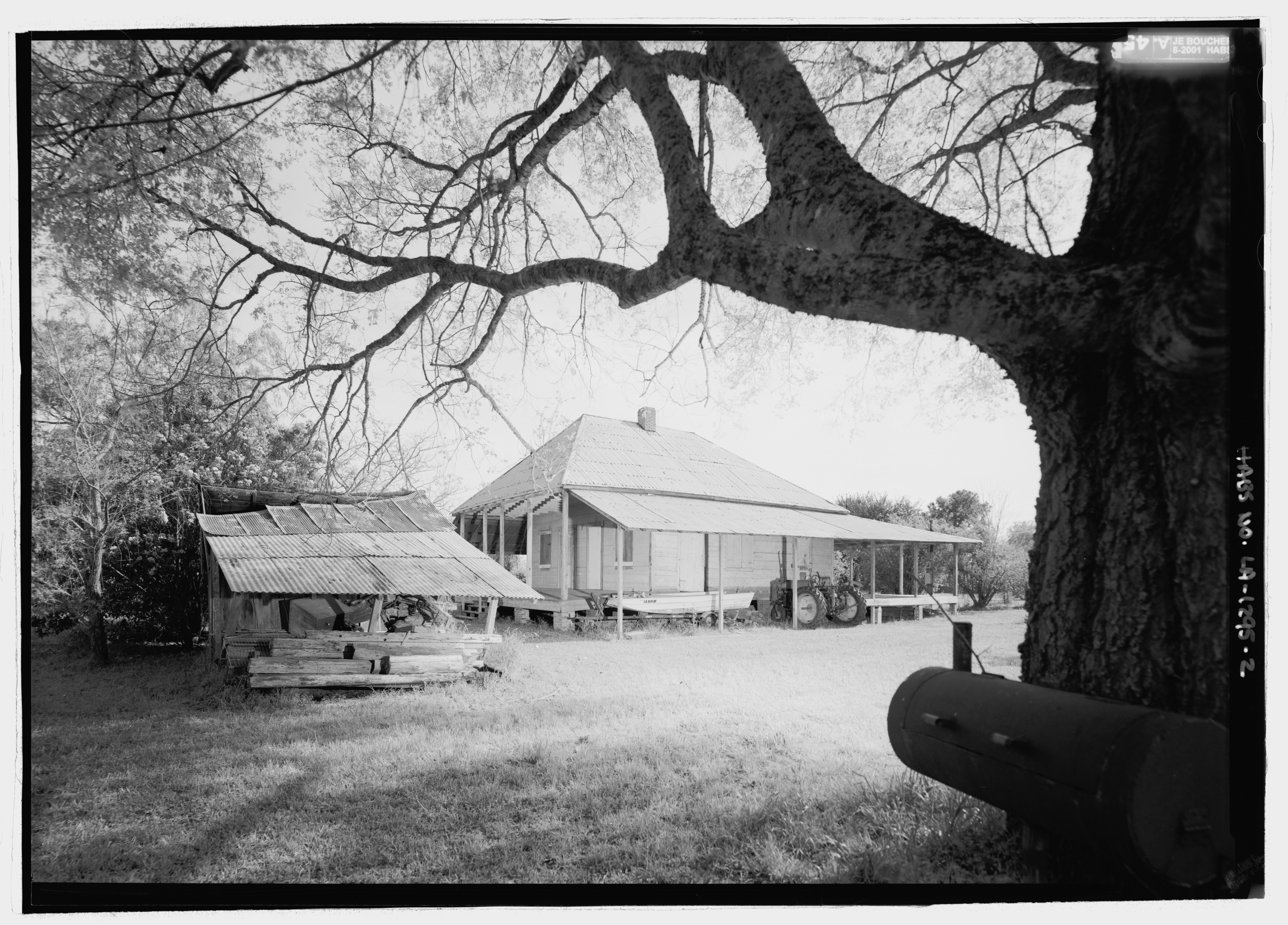
The Coincoin–Prudhomme House, located on dirt road off of Highway 494, about 1 mile Northwest of Bermuda

Coincoin died in 1816 and her grave is no longer marked. Her eldest son Augustin Metoyer donated land for a church at Isle Brevelle, Natchez, Louisiana. In 1829 he commissioned his brother Louis to build the structure, St. Augustine Parish Church. It is believed to be America's first church built by free people of color for their own use.

The Coincoin–Prudhomme House, or Maison De Marie Therese, a small Creole-style cottage constructed of bousillage and half-timber still stands on her original c.1780s–1816 farmstead, it is listed on the National Register of Historic Places since December 6, 1979. The house is now known as the, Maison de Marie Thérèse Coincoin Museum, and is located one mile northwest of Bermuda, the museum is privately owned and open for tours via appointment.

== African origin ==
Tradition holds that Coincoin's African-born parents retained much of their culture, and some evidence supports that. No known document identifies the African birthplace of either parent. Coincoin and four of her siblings carried African names as dits. One Africanist historian proposed in the 1970s that the African Coincoin (spelled variously in transliterations by French and Spanish scribes) was the name used for "second-born daughters" among those Ewe of coastal Togo who speak the Glidzi dialect.

Historians Gary B. and Elizabeth Shown Mills found evidence that Coincoin was the second-born daughter in her birth family. Other possible origins of the name Coincoin, together with the names of her siblings as discovered by Elizabeth Shown Mills, are being studied by Africanist Kevin C. MacDonald at the UCL Institute of Archaeology, University College London.

== In popular culture ==
- German, Norman. No Other World (novel based on Coincoin), Thibodaux, LA: Blue Heron Press, 1992; reprint, 2000, 2011; ISBN 9780962172427.
- Mills, Elizabeth Shown. Isle of Canes, ISBN 9781593313067, is an historical novel that follows Coincoin and the Metoyers across four generations.
- Roberts, Matana. Coin Coin Chapter One: Gens de Couleur Libres (concept album based on Coincoin).

== Sources ==
- Burton, H. Sophie. "Marie Thérèze dit Coincoin: A Free Black Woman on the Louisiana-Texas Frontier." In Nexus of Empire: Negotiating Loyalty and Identity in the Revolutionary Borderlands, 1760s–1820s. Edited by Gene Allen Smith and Sylvia L. Hilton. Gainesville: University Press of Florida, 2010, pp. 89–112.
- MacDonald, Kevin C.; David W. Morgan; Fiona J.L. Handley; Aubra L. Lee; and Emma Morley. "The Archaeology of Local Myths and Heritage Tourism." In A Future for Archaeology: The Past in the Present. New York: Routledge Cavendish, 2006. Chapter 13.
- Mills, Elizabeth Shown. "Documenting a Slave's Birth, Parentage, and Origins(Marie Thérèse Coincoin, 1742–1816): A Test of 'Oral History'”, National Genealogical Society Quarterly 96 (December 2008): 246–66. Archived online at Historic Pathways
- Mills, Elizabeth Shown. "Marie Therese Coincoin: 1742-1816", KnowLa Encyclopedia of Louisiana.
- Mills, Elizabeth Shown. "Marie Thérèse Coincoin (1742–1816): Slave, Slave Owner, and Paradox." Chapter 1 in Janet Allured and Judy Gentry, ed. Louisiana Women: Their Lives and Times (Athens, Ga.: University of Georgia Press, 2009).
- Mills, Elizabeth Shown. "Which Marie Louise Is 'Mariotte'? Sorting Slaves with Common Names", National Genealogical Society Quarterly 94 (September 2006): pp. 183–204.
- Mills, Elizabeth Shown. "A Reader's Guide to the Study of Cane River Creoles" (an annotated bibliography of major sources treating Marie Thérèse and her Metoyer offspring)
- Mills, Elizabeth Shown and Gary B. "Slaves and Masters: The Louisiana Metoyers" (a four-generation genealogy of the offspring of François and Marie Françoise, focusing on the Metoyer line), National Genealogical Society Quarterly 70 (September 1982): pp. 163–89
- Mills, Elizabeth Shown and Gary B. "Missionaries Compromised: Early Evangelization of Slaves and Free People of Color in North Louisiana", Cross, Crozier, and Crucible. Glenn R. Conrad. ed. Baton Rouge: Louisiana Historical Association and Archdiocese of New Orleans, 1993, pp. 30–47.
- Mills, Gary B. and Elizabeth Shown Mills. The Forgotten People: Cane River's Creoles of Color (revised edition), Louisiana State University Press, 2013; ISBN 978-0807137130.
- Mills, Gary B. The Forgotten People: Cane River's Creoles of Color. Baton Rouge: Louisiana State University Press, 1976; ISBN 978-0-8071-0287-9.
- Mills, Gary B. "Coincoin: An Eighteenth-Century 'Liberated' Woman", in Journal of Southern History 42 (May 1976): 203–22. Reprinted in Darlene Clark Hine, ed., Black Women in United States History. Brooklyn: Carlson Publishing, 1990; ISBN 978-0-926019-14-0.
- Mills, Gary B. "Marie Thérèse dite Coincoin", Dictionary of Louisiana Biography. Glenn R. Conrad, ed. 3 vols. New Orleans: Louisiana Historical Association, 1988. Vol. 1: 189–90.
- Ringle, Ken. "Up through Slavery", The Washington Post, May 12, 2002.
- "The Louisiana Metoyers: Melrose's Story of Land and Slaves". American Visions. 15 (3). June 2000. Archived from the original on March 21, 2007 – via FindArticles.
