= Always (Matana Roberts album) =

Studio album by Matana Roberts
- Released: 2015
- Recorded: May 6, 2014
- Studio: Park West Studios, Brooklyn, New York
- Genre: Free jazz
- Length: 43:19
- Label: Relative Pitch; RPR1036

Matana Roberts chronology
Coin Coin Chapter Three: River Run Thee (2015)	Always (2015)	Coin Coin Chapter Four: Memphis (2019)

Always is a solo album by saxophonist and composer Matana Roberts. Consisting of an untitled 33 minute track, followed by a 10-minute encore, it was recorded on May 6, 2014, at Park West Studios in Brooklyn, New York, and was released in 2015 by Relative Pitch Records.

== Reception ==
Professional ratings
Review scores
Source	Rating
All About Jazz	4/5 stars
The Free Jazz Collective	5/5 stars

In a review for The Wire, Andy Hamilton called the album "an intimate affair," and wrote: "The pieces have a softness and slowness to them... The feeling of being at peace - a prevailing calm even when dealing with the music's own natural tensions flows throughout."

Mark Corroto of All About Jazz stated: "Listening to a virtuoso saxophonist like Matana Roberts, one hears more than just breath through a reed instrument. Her solo recording Always, travels beyond voice, to mind, body, and spirit... Underlying all is the corporeal substance of her being. That essence of her spirit's expression that shines throughout this recording."

The editors of The Free Jazz Collective awarded the album a full 5 stars, and reviewer Martin Schray commented: "As in a stream of consciousness Roberts seems to look for a topic, a recurrent theme, a plan she wants to follow... She wanders through the history of great black music, standing on the shoulders of giants... You can recognize bebop licks, blues riffs, staccato rhythms, free jazz runs and balladesque craving. It's a communication with herself, a masterful private meditation, it's about looking for an original sound."

Writing for The Quietus, Stewart Smith noted that Roberts is "quite simply one of the most important living artists in any field," and remarked: "Solo saxophone albums can be a hard sell, but this seemingly modest effort is a beautiful thing... her playing really is poetic, as she calmly moves from long lyrical lines to tight runs of complex harmony."

Bruce Lee Gallanter of the Downtown Music Gallery described the album as "superb... one of tastiest gems of the year." He wrote: "Ms. Roberts closed her eyes and dug deep within to provide us with some sublime, heartfelt sonic medicine... this music is like a candle burning which can't be easily extinguished. In the center of the flame is hope for a better day."

== Track listing ==
Composed by Matana Roberts.

1. "Untitled N. 1" – 33:24
2. "Untitled N. 2" – 9:56

== Personnel ==
- Matana Roberts – alto saxophone
