= Feldspar (album) =

Studio album by Matana Roberts, Sam Shalabi, and Nicolas Caloia
- Released: 2014
- Recorded: December 8, 2011
- Studio: Studio Hotel2Tango, Montreal, Canada
- Genre: Free improvisation
- Length: 47:21
- Label: Tour de Bras; TDB9008cd
- Producer: Éric Normand

Matana Roberts chronology
| Coin Coin Chapter Two: Mississippi Moonchile (2013) | Feldspar (2014) | Coin Coin Chapter Three: River Run Thee (2015) |

Feldspar is an album by saxophonist and composer Matana Roberts, electric guitarist Sam Shalabi, and double bassist Nicolas Caloia. Consisting of seven improvised tracks named after minerals, it was recorded on December 8, 2011, at Studio Hotel2Tango in Montreal, Canada, and was released in 2014 by the Canadian Tour de Bras label.

== Reception ==
Professional ratings
Review scores
| Source | Rating |
|---|---|
| All About Jazz | 3.5/5 stars |
| DownBeat | 3/5 stars |
| The Free Jazz Collective | 4/5 stars |

In a review for DownBeat, Sean O'Connell stated that the album has "the sharp edges of a sheet of ice." He noted the juxtaposition of Roberts' "earthy humanistic tone" with the "spasm-like dissonance" provided by Shalabi and Caloia. He wrote: "Silence is the prevailing uniter. Each band member is unafraid to listen and wait, filling the gaps with the sound of falling snow."

Eyal Hareuveni of All About Jazz called the album "an exceptional improvised meeting," and commented: "Roberts' improvised articulations are rooted in the blues and modern jazz legacies and search for a linear structure that stresses a strong theme, often a highly melodic one, while Shalabi and Caloia aim for associative, abstract textures based on patient shaping of sounds... A challenging meeting of opinionated improvisers."

The Free Jazz Collective's Martin Schray remarked: "The band mainly delves into harsh avant-garde idioms... However, Roberts always keeps a strong element of melody present... In general, bass and guitar provide edgy textures and colorful dots for Roberts' discreet melodies, as if the three were painting a picture, the guitar providing the ground coat, the sax being responsible for the strokes of the brush and the bass for the dots."

Writing for JazzWord, Ken Waxman noted that the recording is "as rugged as it is remarkable." He stated: "Playing together as if they have done so for years, the three evolve a strategy that could almost be a fanciful vaudeville routine between an exuberant and an unruffled comedy team... A utilitarian rather than a trifling listen, concentrating on the sound production here will yield the same multi-faceted rewards that concentrated hard- rock mining does in other situations."

== Track listing ==
1. "Orpiment" – 7:58
2. "Spinel" – 5:27
3. "Galena" – 8:22
4. "Anatase" – 5:11
5. "Opal" – 7:20
6. "Cinnabar" – 4:52
7. "Feldspar" – 7:36

== Personnel ==
- Matana Roberts – alto saxophone
- Sam Shalabi – electric guitar
- Nicolas Caloia – double bass
