= The Glimpse =

The Glimpxe

Studio album by Robert Mitchell
- Released: 18 February 2013
- Recorded: 30–31 August 2012
- Genre: Jazz
- Label: Whirlwind Recordings
- Producer: Pat Thomas

The Glimpse is an album by British jazz pianist Robert Mitchell. It was released on 18 February 2013 by Whirlwind Recordings.

== Track listing ==
1. Amino (Improvisation)
2. Zuni Lore
3. Prelude No 6 (Pour La Main Gauche)
4. Leftitude (Improvisation)
5. The Defiant Gene
6. The Sage
7. A Confession
8. Lullaby No 1 (Infinite Ivy)
9. The Re-Emergent
10. Nocturne for the Left Hand Alone
11. The Glimpse
12. Alice's Touch (Improvisation)

== Credits ==
- Robert Mitchell - Grand Piano
- Produced by Pat Thomas
- Recorded and mastered by Roland Clarke
- Cover art - Sally Pannifex
- Cover photo - Robert Mitchell
- Back cover photo - Alvise Guadagnino
- Recorded at The Capstone Theatre, Liverpool, UK on 30/31 August 2012, on their bespoke Steinway D Grand Piano
- Executive Producer - Michael Janisch
