= The Chicago Project =

Studio album by Matana Roberts
- Released: 2008
- Studio: Soma Studios, Chicago, Illinois
- Genre: Free jazz
- Length: 56:21
- Label: Central Control International; CCI006LP
- Producer: Vijay Iyer

Matana Roberts chronology
The Calling (2006)	The Chicago Project (2008)	Live in London (2011)

The Chicago Project is an album by saxophonist and composer Matana Roberts. Produced by Vijay Iyer and engineered by John McEntire, it was recorded at Soma Studios in Chicago, Illinois, and was released on CD and vinyl in 2008 by Central Control International. The album pays homage to Roberts's home town, and features guitarist Jeff Parker, double bassist Josh Abrams, and drummer Frank Rosaly, with guest saxophonist Fred Anderson appearing on three tracks for which he shares writing credits with Roberts.

== Reception ==
Professional ratings
Review scores
Source	Rating
All About Jazz	5/5 stars
All About Jazz	4/5 stars
All About Jazz	5/5 stars
AllMusic	3/5 stars
The Free Jazz Collective	4/5 stars
PopMatters	6/10 stars
Tom Hull – on the Web	B

In an article for The New York Times, Nate Chinen called the album "a potent statement" that "manages to present Ms. Roberts's unruly creative energy in digestible form," and described the music as "rich in context and subtext, sprawling with ambition, anchored by the force of her presence."

The Independent's Phil Johnson called the album "stunning," and stated: "What's so impressive is not just Roberts's chops and tunes, but the thought that's gone into making the album work as a whole."

Pat Hajduch of Alarm Magazine wrote: "With Abrams' and Rosaly's abilities to hold the rhythms down, these tracks click and bounce while illustrating the sum of the group's parts... The Chicago Project is a testament to the Chicago jazz scene's brilliance, not to mention the abilities of Ms. Roberts."

Commenting for the BBC, Nick Reynolds described the album as "impressive," with Roberts "ably and energetically supported by" her sidemen, but noted that "the production is basic," and suggested that "there's no sense that the sonic innovations or musical ideas of the past thirty years have touched Matana's music."

In a review for All About Jazz, Mark F. Turner praised Roberts's "profound soulfulness, passion and purity," and remarked: "Roberts has carefully listened to others and has learned. But she's also listening to her inner voice and it will be interesting to hear where she ventures next." AAJ's Matthew Miller stated: "The main success of The Chicago Project and Roberts' music in general is the compelling balance struck between reverence for the past and an unflinching devotion to the present... Roberts acknowledges the past, but never in a way that subverts her forward-looking music." AAJ writer Troy Collins wrote: "Roberts establishes her Chicago bred lineage with this stunning, forward thinking release... [she] eradicates stereotypical notions of gender with a phenomenal performance and winning compositional sense."

Anthony Tognazzini of AllMusic called Roberts "an impressive player" and "a talented and noteworthy composer," and noted that her music "balances various strains of jazz history with skilled improvisation, precise group interplay, and sonic adventurousness."

Writing for PopMatters, Evan Sawdey commented: "it's obvious that Roberts is trying to split the difference between such freeform touchstones as A Love Supreme and Bitches Brew without batting an eye... Yet in the jazz market today, you can't have your cake and eat it too... Roberts' ambitions wind up getting the best of her."

A writer for the Manchester Evening News stated: "[Roberts's] music is expressive, high-minded and serious, but where it should be fearsome, it comes out as joyous and affirmative... It's wonderful that something so uncompromising could be so inviting."

The Free Jazz Collective's Stef Gijssels noted that Roberts is "a wonderful synthesist, integrating the best of modern free jazz in her music," and remarked: "Her compositions are very melodic and rhythmic, yet very free at the same time, very soulful and bluesy... And the great thing here is the variation she brings into every piece, which are well-structured, with lots of style variations, rhythm and tempo changes, while maintaining this free edge."

== Track listing ==
Track timings not provided.

1. "Exchange" (Matana Roberts)
2. "Thrills" (Matana Roberts)
3. "Birdhouse 1" (Matana Roberts, Fred Anderson)
4. "Nomra" (Matana Roberts)
5. "Love Call" (Matana Roberts) - bonus track on CD release
6. "Birdhouse 2" (Matana Roberts, Fred Anderson)
7. "South By West" (Matana Roberts)
8. "For Razi" (Matana Roberts)
9. "Birdhouse 3" (Matana Roberts, Fred Anderson)

== Personnel ==
- Matana Roberts – saxophone
- Fred Anderson – saxophone on "Birdhouse" 1, 2, and 3
- Jeff Parker – guitar
- Josh Abrams – double bass
- Frank Rosaly – drums
