= Live in London (Matana Roberts album) =

Live album by Matana Roberts
- Released: 2011
- Recorded: 2009
- Venue: Vortex Jazz Club, London
- Genre: Free jazz
- Length: 1:13:14
- Label: Central Control International; CCI014CD

Matana Roberts chronology
The Chicago Project (2008)	Live in London (2011)	Coin Coin Chapter One: Gens de Couleur Libres (2011)

Live in London is a live album by saxophonist and composer Matana Roberts. It was recorded during 2009 at the Vortex Jazz Club in London, and was released in 2011 by Central Control International. On the album, Roberts is joined by pianist Robert Mitchell, double bassist Tom Mason, and drummer Chris Vatalaro.

The album was recorded with minimal preparation on the part of the musicians. In an interview for Burning Ambulance, Roberts indicated that she had performed with the group roughly a year prior to the concert, and stated: "I knew what they could handle, and I'd played with them before, so I was like, Let's do this." She was initially surprised when the Central Control label expressed an interest in releasing a recording of the event, but eventually agreed, commenting: "I was like, Well, this is an opportunity for people to really hear us riding by the seat of our pants. Cause that's what that record really is."

== Reception ==
Professional ratings
Review scores
Source	Rating
Financial Times	4/5 stars
The Free Jazz Collective	4/5 stars
The Guardian	4/5 stars
The Jazz Mann	3.5/5 stars
Tom Hull – on the Web	B+

In a review for The Guardian, John Fordham described the album as "vibrant," and wrote: "The independence with which the young Chicagoan has developed a 1960s free-jazz sax approach... goes way outside her years and the dominant tastes of her generation. This set represents all that, but also captures the on-the-fly evolution of an enthralling gig with a local rhythm section... this was a live show to remember, and fortunately preserved."

The BBC's Kevin Le Gendre noted that the album finds Roberts playing "lengthy, absorbing arrangements that are really suites emboldened by a well-handled rise and fall of tension," and commented: "There is a restless but disciplined effervescence in Roberts' playing that loosely recalls adventurous spirits like Oliver Lake, but Live In London confirms a fast-maturing individuality."

Mike Hobart of the Financial Times called Roberts' tone "full and vibrant," and stated that the album "neatly captures the alto saxophonist's free jazz spontaneity, lean phrasing and trenchant emotion... an extended trek through expressionist pinnacles, soulful eulogies and bass-driven swing."

Writing for The Free Jazz Collective, Stef Gijssels commented: "even if Roberts has the main voice on the album, the band does a great job in supporting her warm and energetic playing... It is not a very adventurous album, but the playing is good and the overall quality excellent."

A reviewer for All About Jazz described the music as "a group of performances that have a natural ebb and flow to them, a Roberts hallmark," and remarked: "As a live performance across the pond, it doesn't have the benefit of changing the personnel around to meet each song's unique challenges or the luxury of being able to overdub sax parts, but the immediacy of playing in front of crowd replaces that... Roberts furthers her reputation by demonstrating that she can pour out both her emotions and virtuosity in equal heaping helpings on the high wire act of an unrehearsed stage performance."

In an article for The Independent, Phil Johnson called the music "wailing, bluesy free jazz," and wrote: "She's a fantastic player but you have to dig in and concentrate... listen to her wail on Ellington's 'Oskar T' and marvel."

Ian Mann of The Jazz Mann stated: "This is challenging stuff, a musical white knuckle ride with plenty to thrill and inspire the listener. Matana Roberts can only get better and similarly the international exposure granted to the UK based players can only help to enhance their reputations."

== Track listing ==
1. "My Sistr" (Chad Jones) – 27:36
2. "Pieces of We" (Matana Roberts) – 10:19
3. "Glass" (Matana Roberts) – 12:29
4. "Turn it Around" (Matana Roberts) – 6:33
5. "Oska T" (Duke Ellington) – 11:38
6. "Exchange" (Matana Roberts) – 4:31

== Personnel ==
- Matana Roberts – saxophone
- Robert Mitchell – piano
- Tom Mason – double bass
- Chris Vatalaro – drums
