= Coin Coin Chapter One: Gens de Couleur Libres =

Live album by Matana Roberts
- Released: May 10, 2011
- Genre: Free jazz; avant-garde jazz
- Length: 61:15
- Label: Constellation

Matana Roberts chronology
Live in London (2011)	Coin Coin Chapter One: Gens de Couleur Libres (2011)	Coin Coin Chapter Two: Mississippi Moonchile (2013)

Coin Coin Chapter One: Gens de Couleur Libres is a live in-studio album by jazz saxophonist Matana Roberts. It was the first of their twelve-chapter Coin Coin project, which is named after Marie Thérèse Coincoin. It was released by Constellation Records in 2011.

== Critical reception ==
The album scored a metascore of 84/100 on Metacritic, based on 6 reviews, indicating 'universal acclaim'.

BBC Music greeted the album warmly, writing:

The musical terrain is fast-changing, with moods switching repeatedly. This is an ambitious work, and all of its aims have surely been fulfilled. Roberts is already an artist with multiple facets, deftly accentuated to suit each musical circumstance.

Chris Barton of the Los Angeles Times named the album one of the top ten jazz releases of 2011.

== Track listing ==
No.	Title	Length
1.	"Rise"	7:28
2.	"Pov Piti"	7:41
3.	"Song For Eulalie"	8:26
4.	"Kersaia"	7:33
5.	"Libation for Mr. Brown: Bid 'Em In..."	9:48
6.	"Lulla/Bye"	5:54
7.	"I Am"	10:06
8.	"How Much Would You Cost?"	4:19

== Personnel ==
- Matana Roberts: reeds/voice
- Gitanjali Jain: voice
- David Ryshpan: piano/organ
- Nicolas Caloia: cello
- Ellwood Epps: trumpet
- Brian Lipson: bass trumpet
- Fred Bazil: tenor sax
- Jason Sharp: baritone sax
- Hraïr Hratchian: doudouk
- Marie Davidson: violin
- Josh Zubot: violin
- Lisa Gamble: musical saw
- Thierry Amar: bass
- Jonah Fortune: bass
- David Payant: drums/vibes
- Xarah Dion: prepared guitar
- Recording/Mixing: Radwan Moumneh
- Mastering: Harris Newman
