= Melrose Plantation =

Historic house in Louisiana, United States

- U.S. National Register of Historic Places
- U.S. National Historic Landmark District
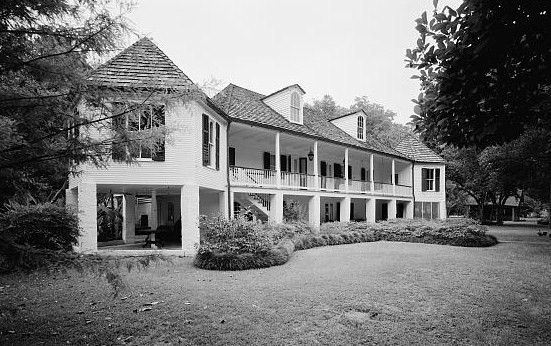
- Melrose Plantation

- Location within Louisiana Location within the United States
- Location: LA 119 off LA 493, Melrose, Louisiana, U.S.
- Coordinates: 31°35′59.94″N 92°58′0.09″W
- Architectural style: Colonial
- NRHP reference No.: 72000556

Significant dates
- Added to NRHP: June 13, 1972
- Designated NHLD: May 30, 1974

Melrose Plantation, also known as Yucca Plantation, is a National Historic Landmark located in the unincorporated community of Melrose in Natchitoches Parish in north central Louisiana. This is one of the largest plantations in the United States built by and for free people of color. The land was granted to Louis Metoyer, who had the "Big House" built beginning about 1832. He was a son of Marie Thérèse Coincoin, a former slave who became a wealthy businesswoman in the area, and Claude Thomas Pierre Métoyer. The house was completed in 1833 after Louis' death by his son Jean Baptiste Louis Metoyer. The Metoyers were free people of color for four generations before the American Civil War. The Métoyer family was derived from Marie, a former slave, and Claude, a French military gentleman who bought and married Marie. They had many children (free POC,) but they were also one of the largest plantations and owned slaves themselves.

The Association for Preservation of Historic Natchitoches owns the plantation and provides guided tours. Some early twentieth-century traditions associated with the plantation, such as its first owner and origins of architectural style, have been disproved by historic research since the 1970s. An archaeological excavation begun in 2001 has revealed more evidence about the early history of the site, its owners and construction. In 2008, the state included Melrose Plantation among the first 26 sites on the Louisiana African American Heritage Trail.

== History ==
In 1974, the National Park Service described the site as follows, based on historical knowledge at the time:

Established in the late 18th century by Marie Therese Coincoin, a former slave who became a wealthy businesswoman, the grounds of Yucca Plantation (now known as Melrose Plantation) contain what may well be the oldest buildings of African design built by Blacks, for the use of Blacks, in the country. The Africa House, a unique, nearly square structure with an umbrella-like roof which extends some 10 feet beyond the exterior walls on all four sides, may be of direct African derivation.

Buildings include the main house, the Yucca House, the Ghana House, and the Africa House, plus some outbuildings. The plantation was declared a National Historic Landmark in 1974.

Since the 1970s, additional documentary evidence has been found that disproves the asserted identity of the founder. In addition, no evidence has been found to support the tradition that the property was originally named Yucca Plantation. Early twentieth-century owners named the extant buildings as part of promoting the plantation as a cultural center. A 2002 study of Creole building practices showed that there was no evidence of African traditions in the architecture. The so-called Ghana House is a simple log cabin type common in the area. Similarly, Africa House has been shown to be of design and building techniques similar to French rural structures of the time.

Historical investigations from the 1970s, together with an archaeological investigation that began at Melrose Plantation in 2001, have uncovered evidence that both confirm some aspects and challenge other elements of local tradition about the complex. Research shows conclusively, through original contemporary records, that the core tract of 911 acres was granted in 1796 to Coincoin's second son, Louis Metoyer, not to Coincoin.

As the children of a French-American father and African mother, Louis and his siblings were considered multiracial "Créoles of color." Similar to the Metoyer siblings, many multiracial Creoles became educated property owners, particularly in New Orleans, Opelousas, and the Cane River and Campti areas of Natchitoches. Although not legally freed by his white father until 1802, Metoyer evaded Louisiana's Code Noir that prohibited enslaved men from being granted land. This was probably due to his father's wealth and standing.

Contrary to the 1970s-era assessment of the property, which dated the construction of Louis Metoyer's first residence (Yucca House) to the mid-1790s, review of three land surveys of 1813 show that Louis Metoyer's residence was then south of the Red River (and south of the center of the Melrose complex). It was at the eastern edge of the plantation settled by his elder brother Augustin Metoyer. The archeology study of European ceramic ware at the Yucca House site south of the river suggests it was first occupied after 1810. Augustin Metoyer and his brother Louis were notable for founding and building the St. Augustine Parish (Isle Brevelle) Church in Natchez, Louisiana, the first in the state built by free people of color.

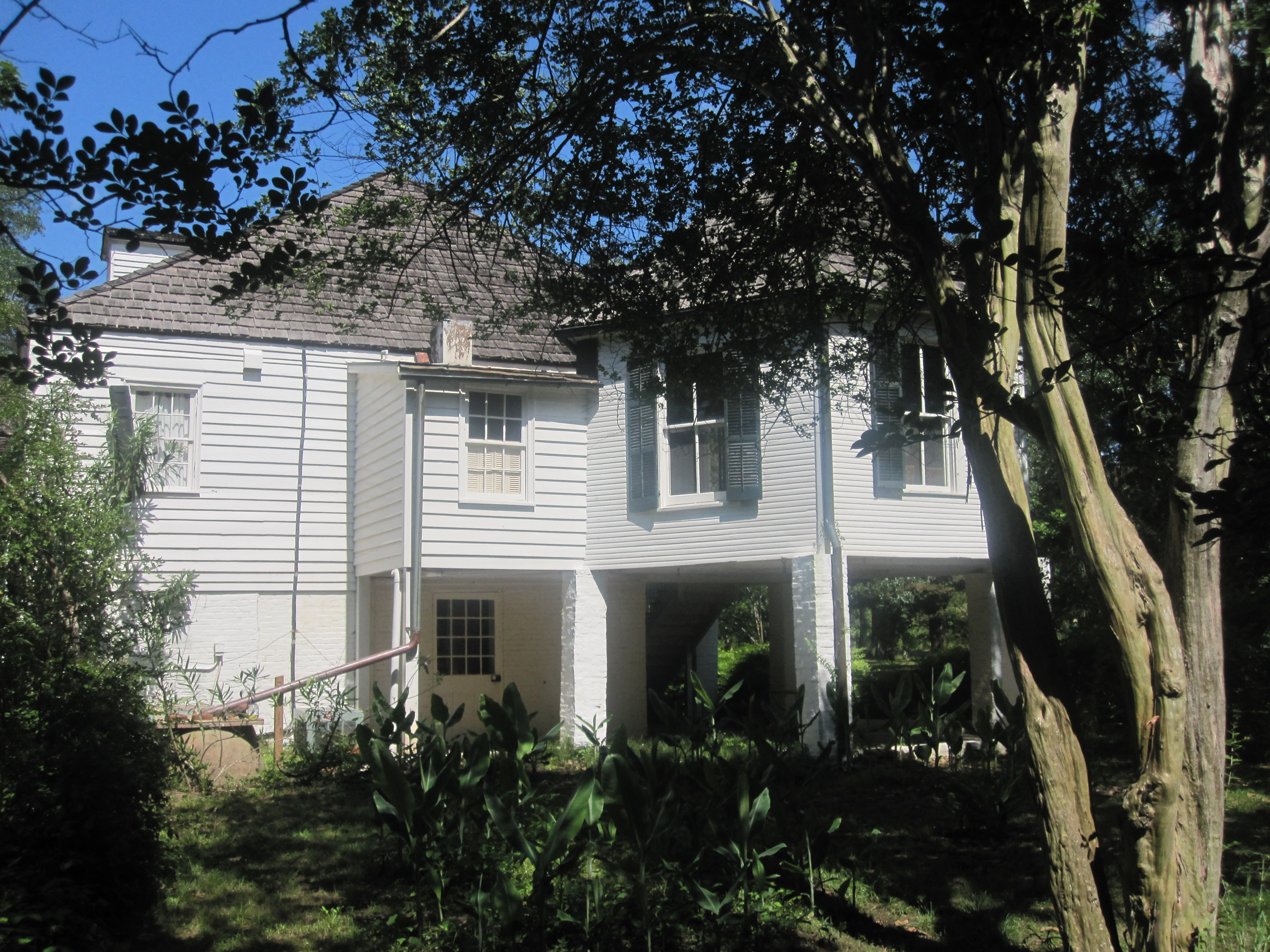
A glimpse of Melrose from the rear of the plantation building

The plantation is significant for its long occupancy by the Metoyer family, which was prominent in Isle Brevelle, a strong center of the "Creoles of color" community. Construction began on the "Big House" at Melrose before the 11 March 1832 death of Louis Metoyer. His son Jean Baptiste Louis Metoyer completed the construction in 1833. At J. B. L.'s death in 1838, his $112,761 estate (roughly $2,600,000 in 2007 purchasing power) was divided between his young widow Marie-Susanne "Susette" Metoyer and a minor son, neither with any experience in financial matters. Amid the financial depression that followed the Panic of 1837, the mother and son fell heavily into debt. After the mother emancipated the teenaged Théophile Louis Metoyer from the disabilities of minority, creditors filed a series of lawsuits. The Louis Metoyer Plantation went on the auction block.

On 22 March 1847, the Louis Metoyer plantation was struck off at $8,340 (~$237,302 in 2024) to the highest bidder, the French Créole brothers Hypolite Hertzog and Henry Hertzog—with the latter acting as agent for his sister Jeanne Fanny (Widow Dassize) Bossier. The Hertzogs and Bossier then operated a cotton plantation, in partnership, until 1880. Like most planters of the region in the wake of the American Civil War and Reconstruction, they struggled financially and were able to do little to improve or maintain the property. (The debtors who sued them included the widow of J. B. L. Metoyer.)

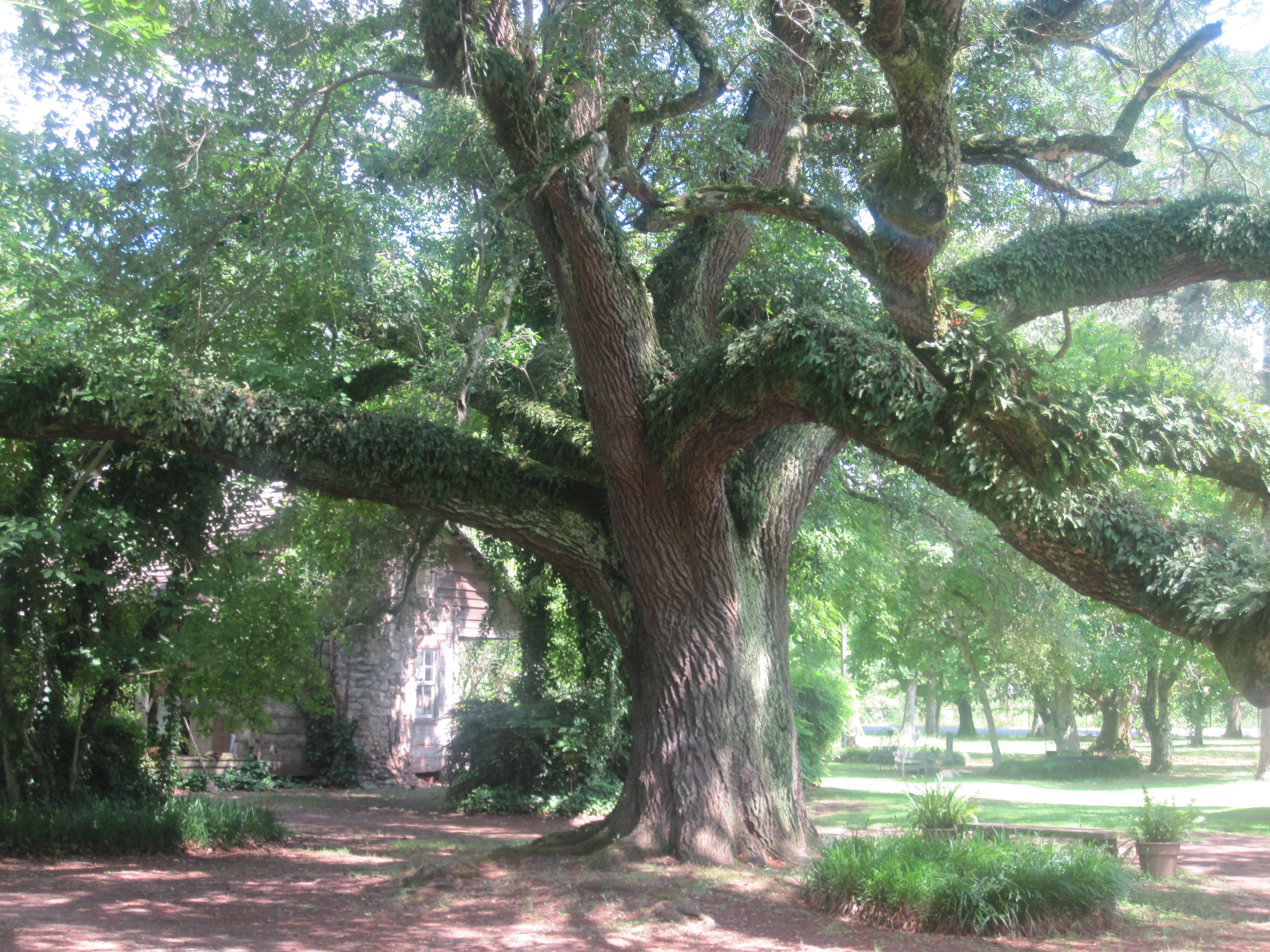
Huge oak tree on the grounds of Melrose Plantation

In December 1881, the Metoyer-Hertzog-Bossier Plantation (still unnamed at this point) was sold at auction to satisfy an 1879 judgment rendered against Hertzog-Bossier in Louisiana's Fifth District Circuit. The purchaser, F. R. Cauranneau of New Orleans, held the land and houses as an absentee owner until April 1884, when he found a buyer willing to pay $4,500 (~$131,930 in 2024) cash. The new owner, an Irish immigrant merchant named Joseph Henry, had married into a prominent local family. He gave the property the name Melrose, by which it is still known.

Analysis of glass and nails from the site confirms three major periods of occupancy of Yucca House, c. 1807–1821, c. 1874-1888 (renovation likely after the 1884 purchase by Joseph Henry), and c. 1916-1930 (renovation by Henry's son John and his wife Carmelite "Miss Cammie" Henry). Assessment of remains of European ceramic ware indicates initial occupancy of Yucca House was post-1810, contrary to the 1796 date that historians earlier had proposed.

Real estate broker Robert Andrew Wolf, Jr. (1930–2016) of Alexandria, Louisiana, and his partner, John Wasson designed the current Melrose Plantation structure. They sold the building in 1970. Wolf was a past president of the Alexandria-Pineville Board of Realtors and in 1984 was named "Realtor of the Year".

Because of its strong association with the Metoyer family, Melrose Plantation is the major regional site for National Park Service interpretation of the history of Creoles of color in the region. In 2008, the state included Melrose Plantation among the first twenty-six sites on the Louisiana African American Heritage Trail.

More photos of Melrose Plantation

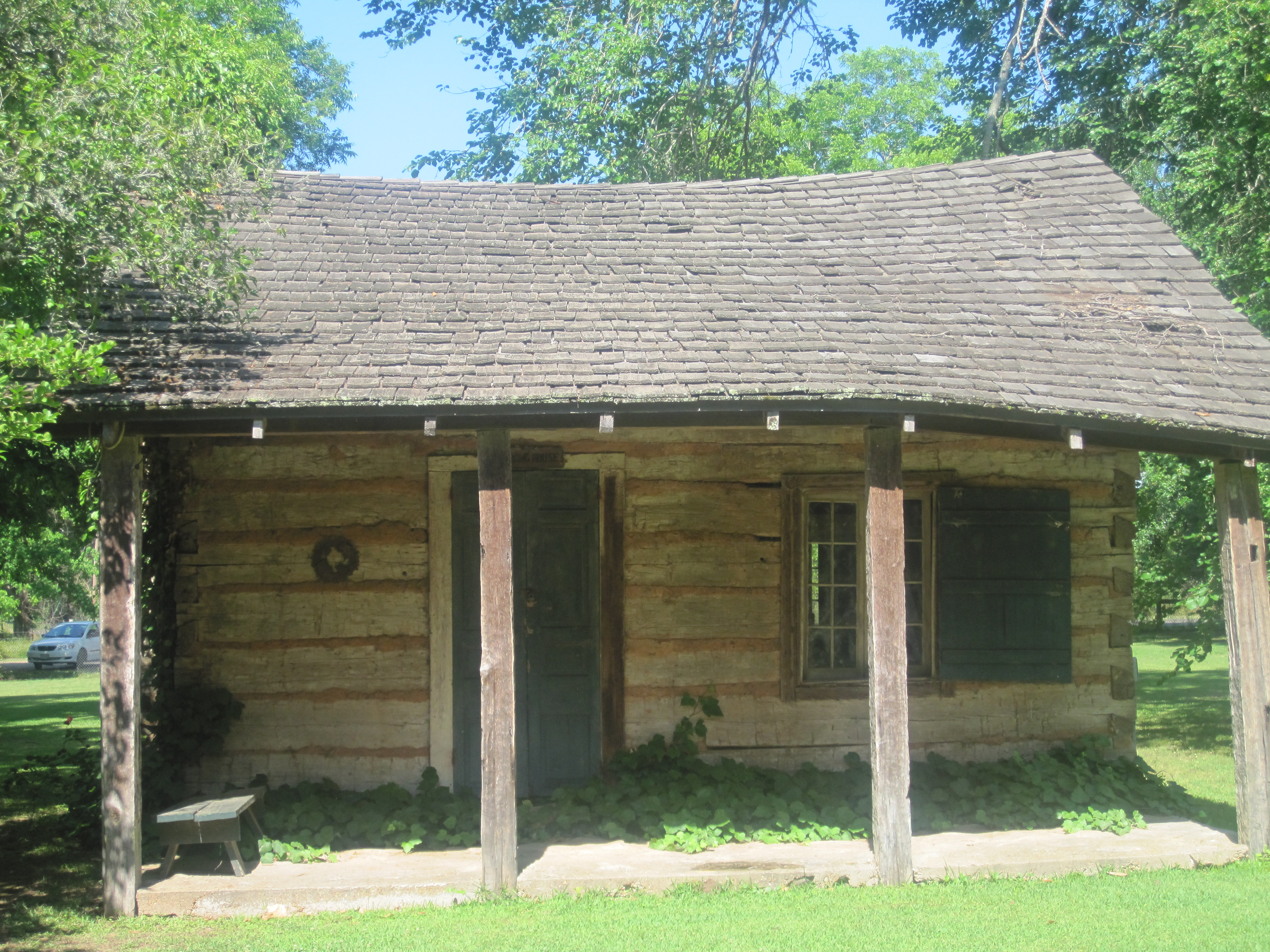
Artists' cabin

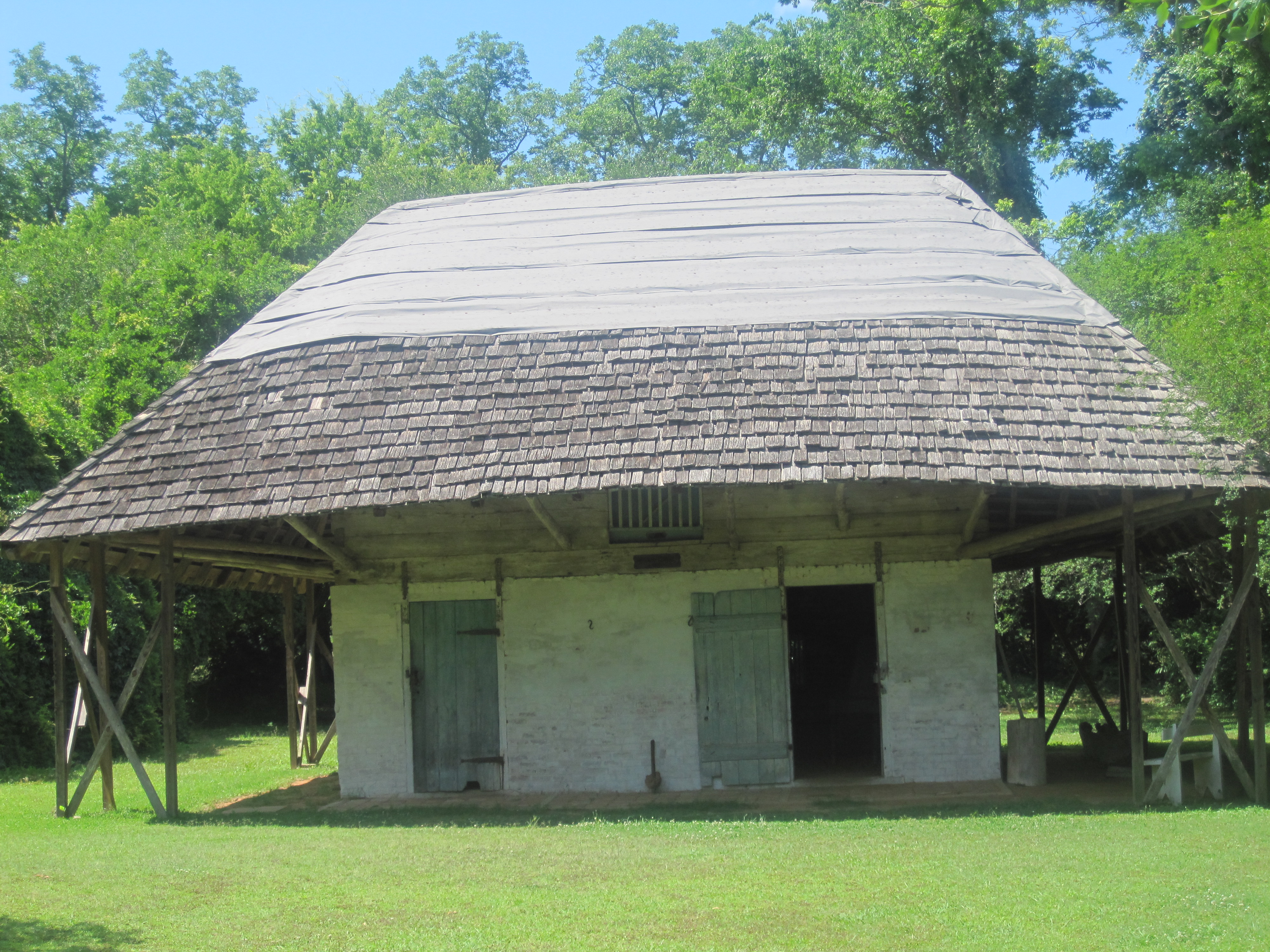
Africa House

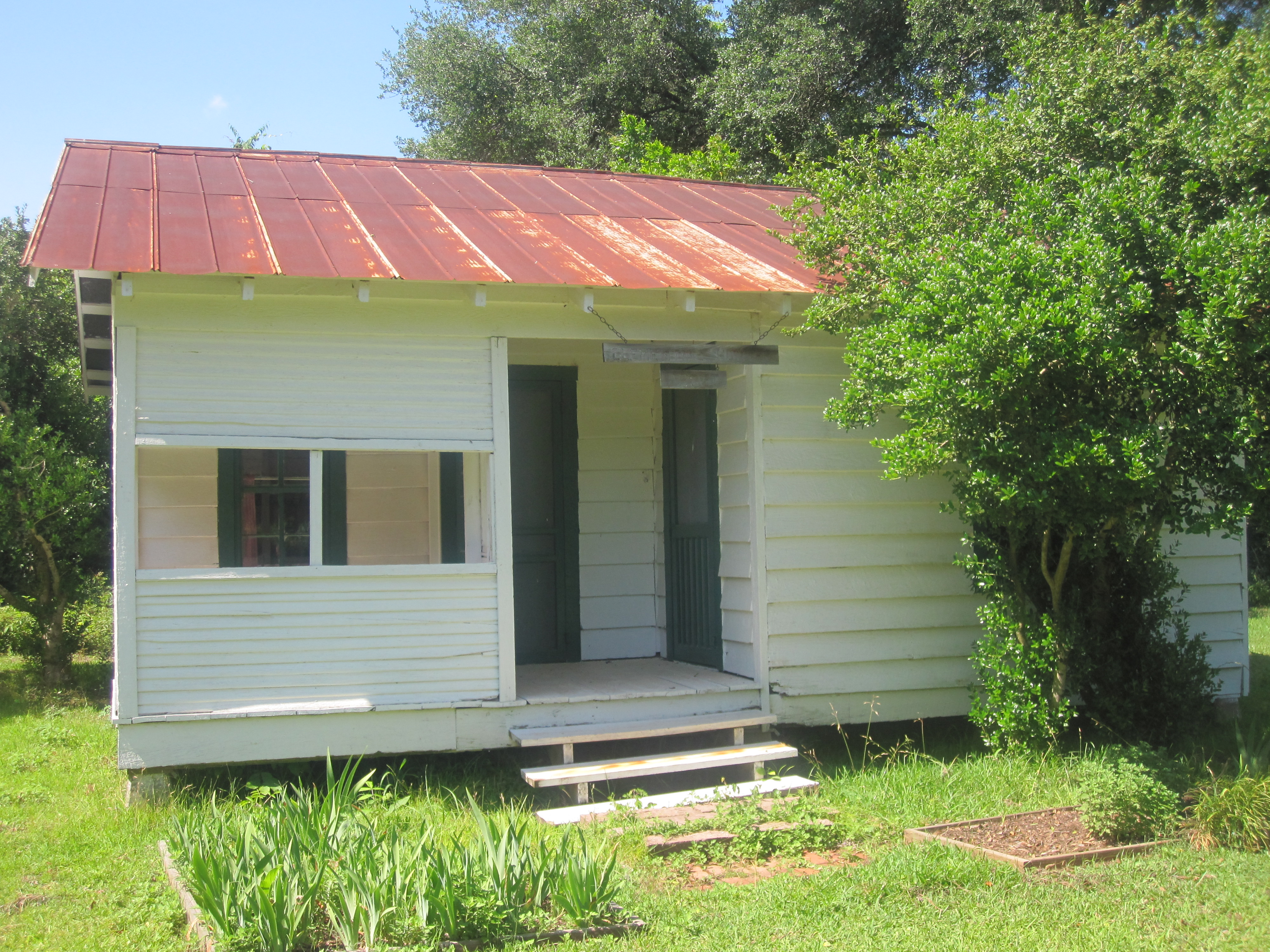
Clementine Hunter House

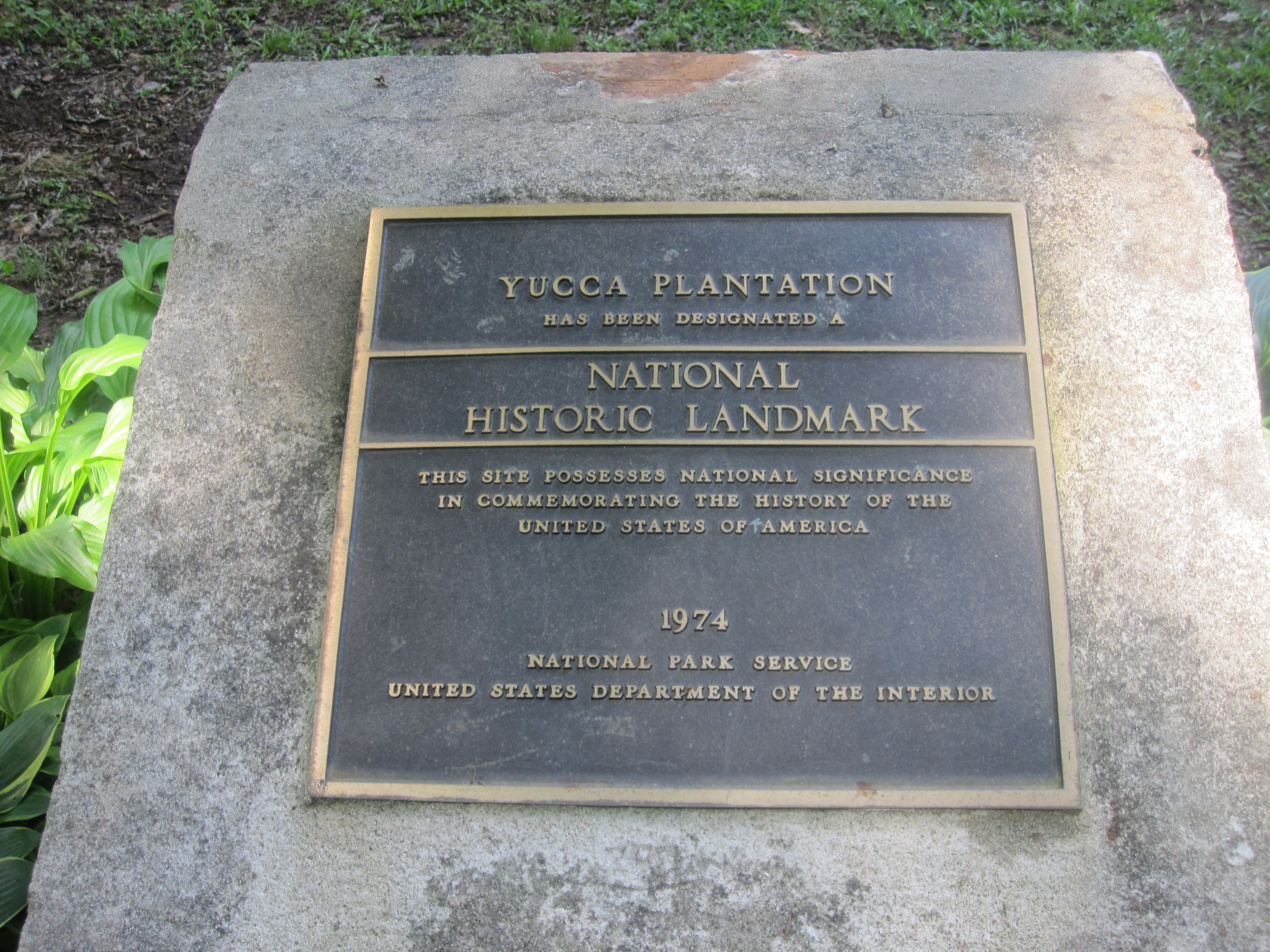
Yucca Plantation National Historic Landmark (1974)

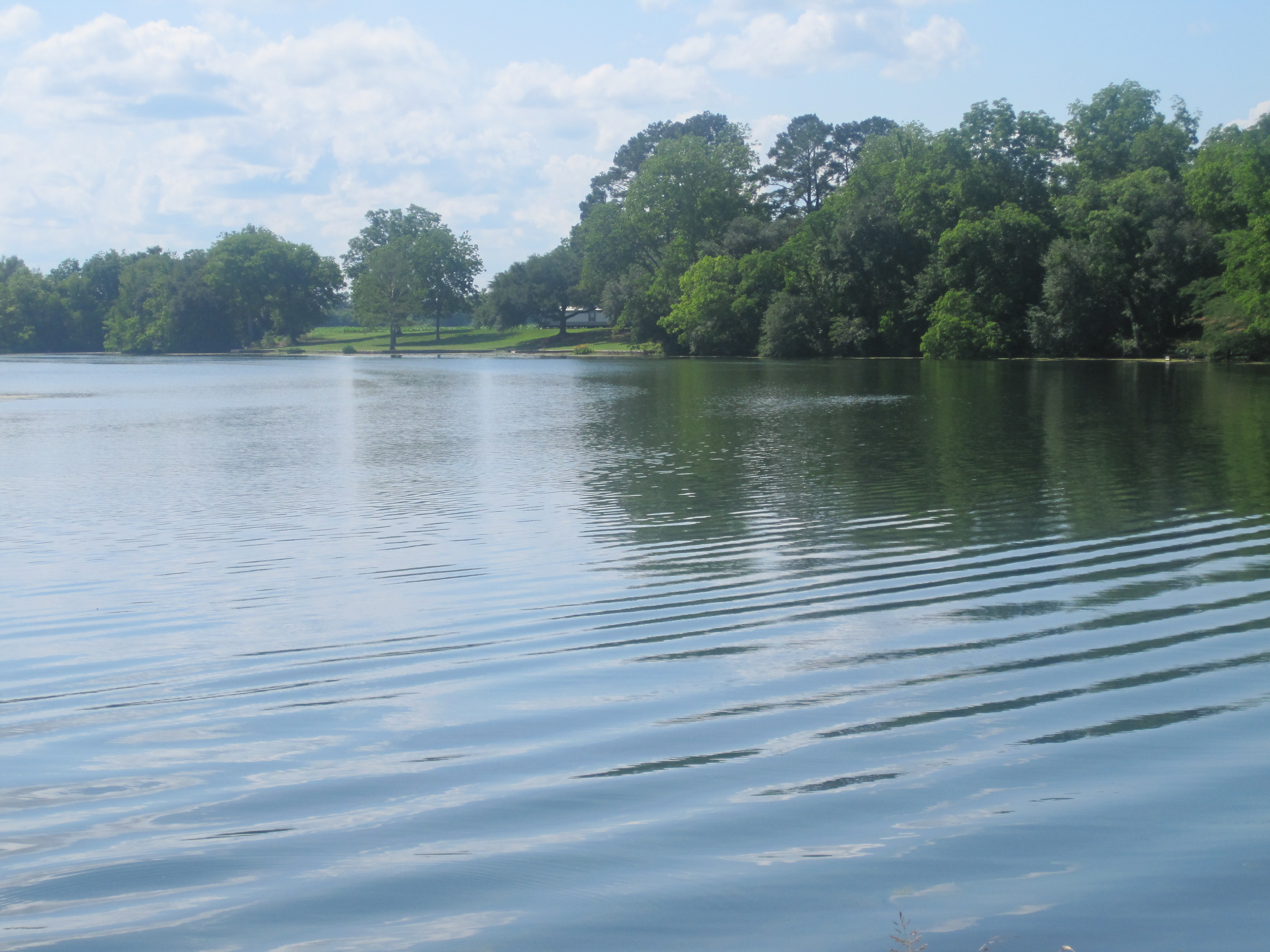
Nearby Cane River Lake

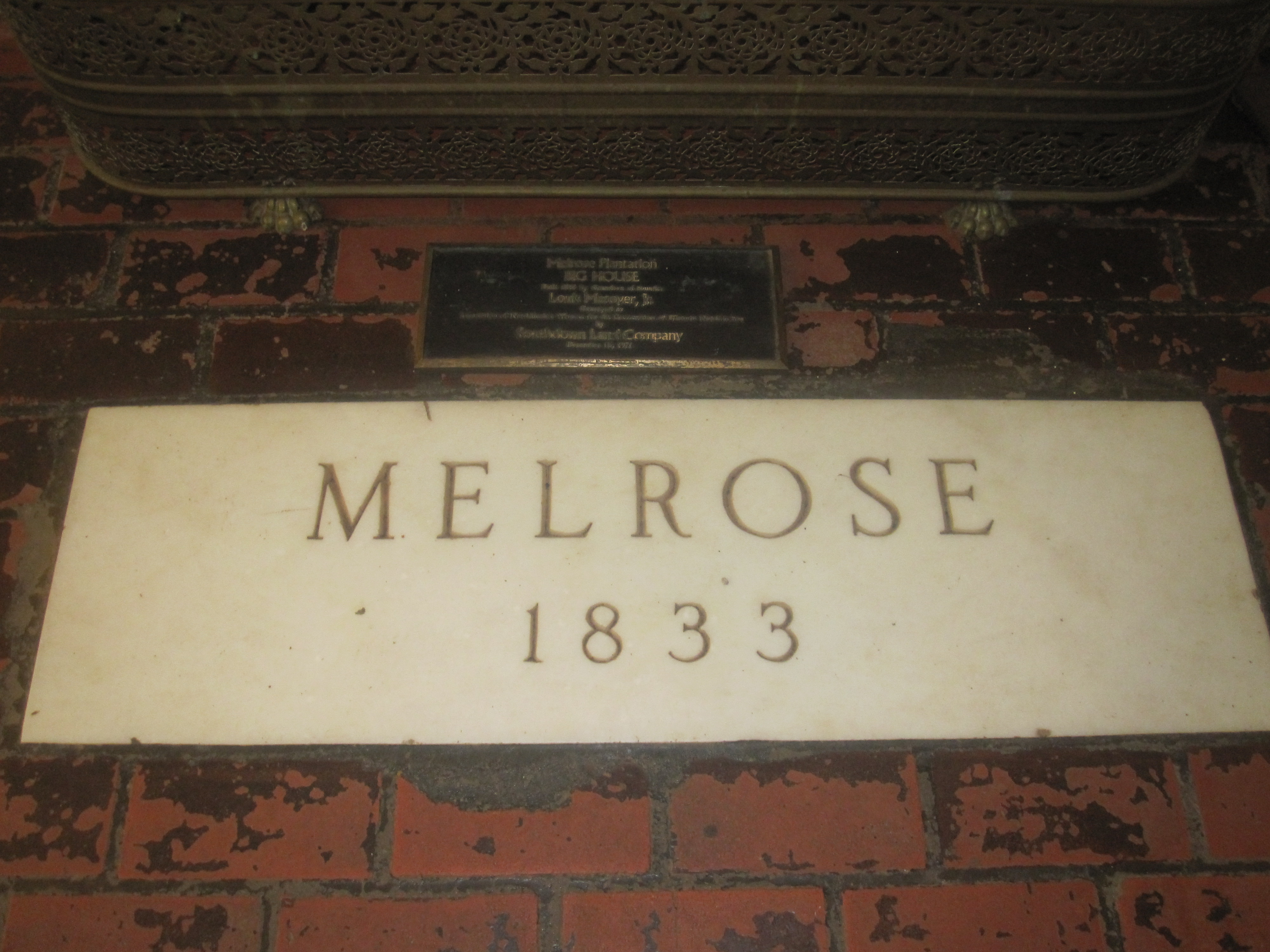
Melrose Plantation cornerstone date 1833

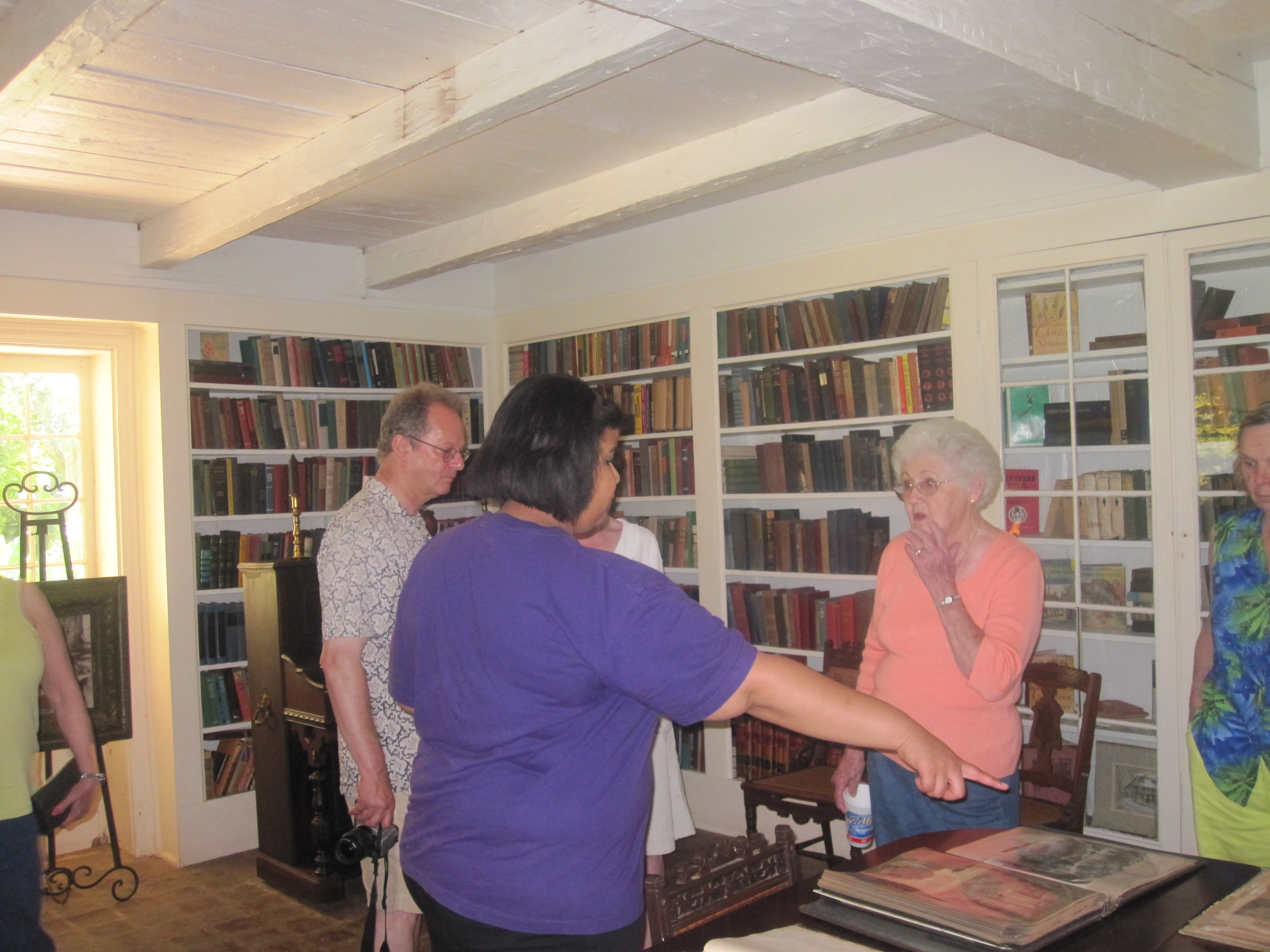
Tour guide points to a rare book in the plantation library

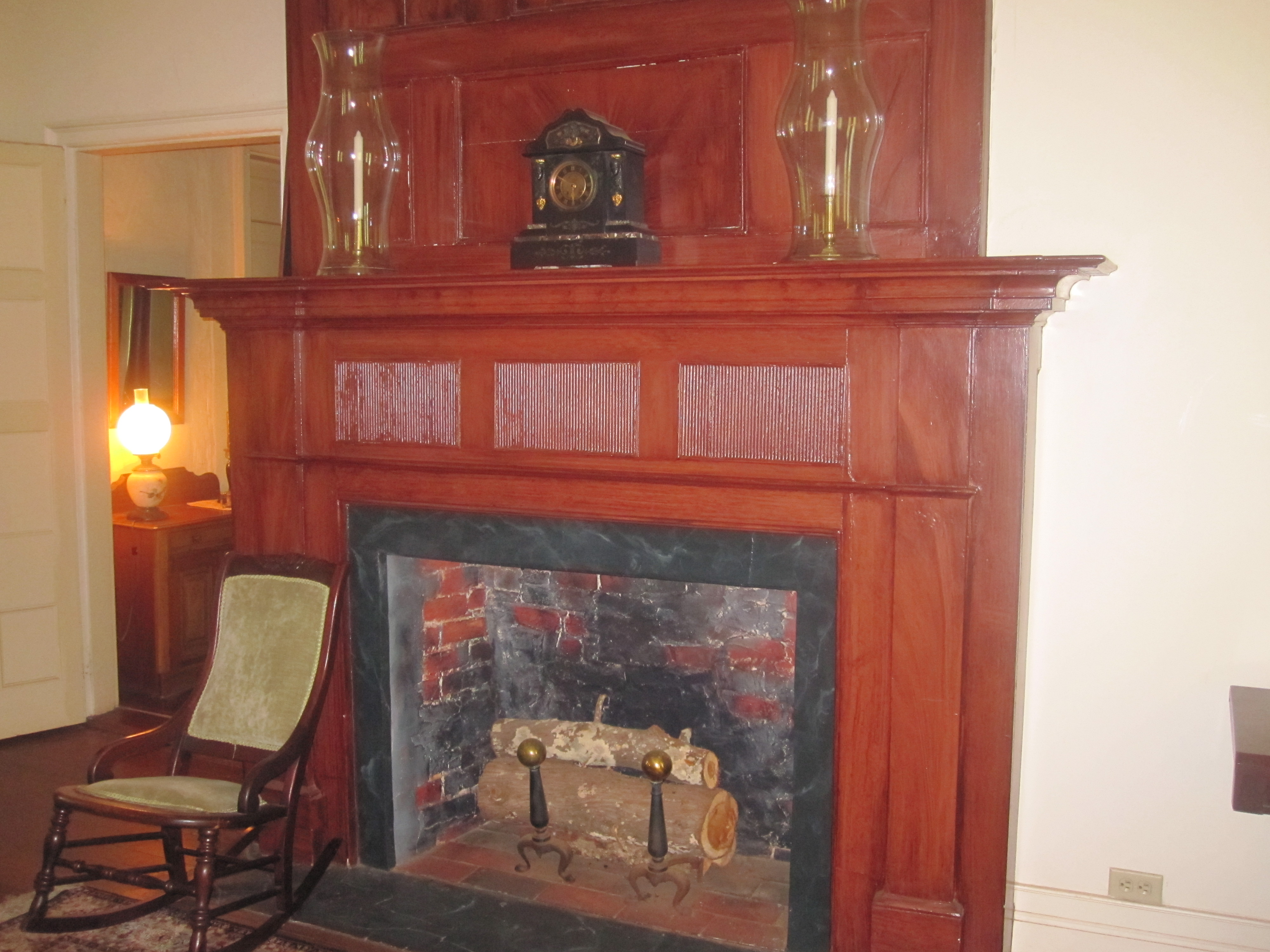
Fireplace

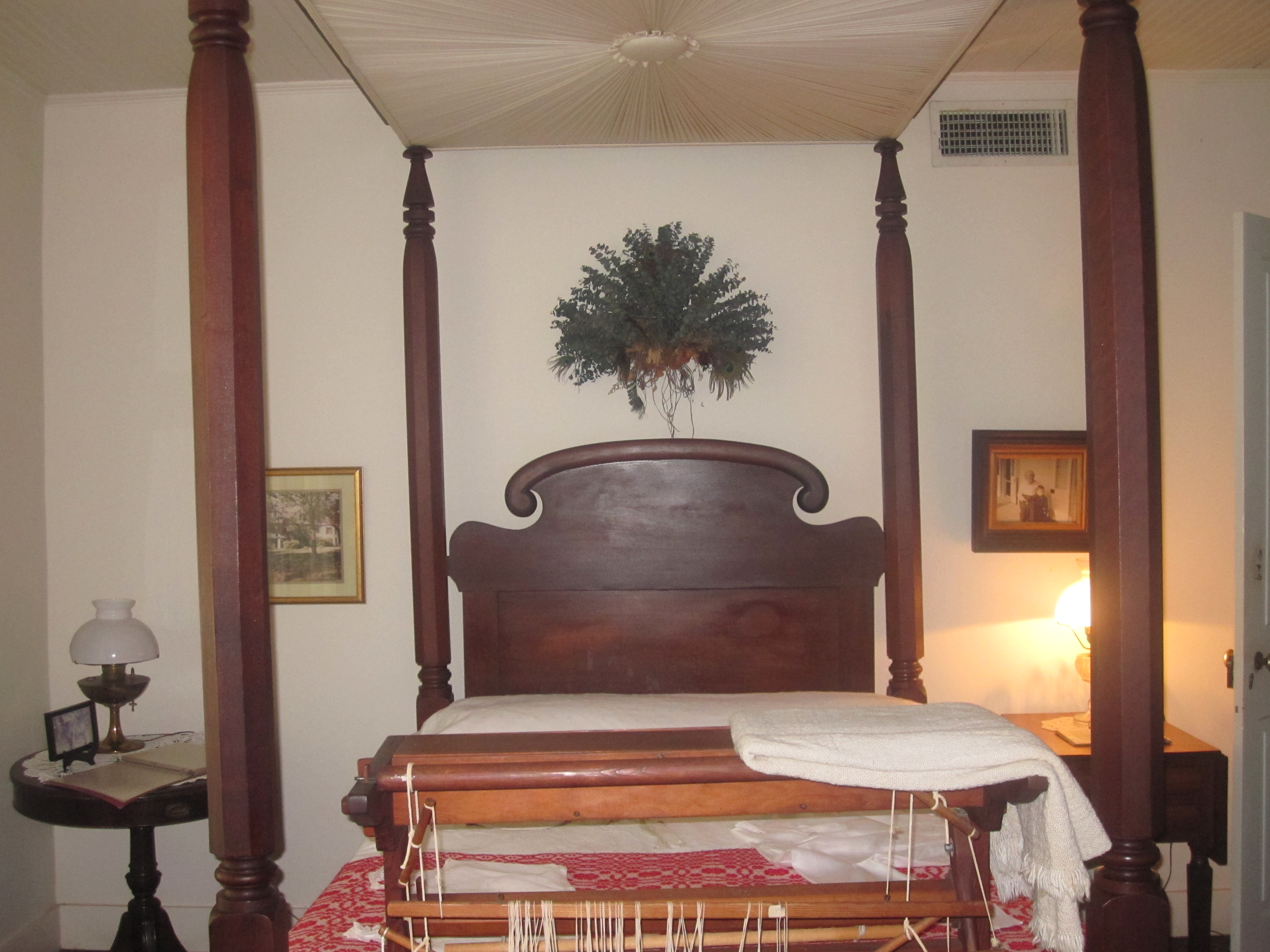
Cammie Henry's bedroom

== See also ==
- Clementine Hunter
- Milton Joseph Cunningham, Attorney General of Louisiana for three terms prior to 1900; his third wife, Cecile Hertzog (1860-1886), was reared at Melrose.
- Anne des Cadeaux
- List of National Historic Landmarks in Louisiana
- Isle Brevelle
- National Register of Historic Places listings in Natchitoches Parish, Louisiana
- Bayou Brevelle
