= Elizabeth Shown Mills =

American author (born 1944)

- Born: Elizabeth Shown; December 29, 1944 (age 81); Cleveland, Mississippi, U.S.
- Occupations: Genealogist, historian
- Years active: 1992–present
- Known for: Isle of Canes (2004)
- Spouse: Gary B. Mills (divorced)

Academic background
- Thesis: Family and Social Patterns of the Colonial Louisiana Frontier: A Quantitative Analysis, 1714–1803 (1981)

Elizabeth Shown Mills (born 1944) is an American genealogist, historian, and author. She served as president of the American Society of Genealogists (ASG), and was the editor of the National Genealogical Society Quarterly.

== Biography ==
Mills was born on December 29, 1944, in Cleveland, Mississippi. Most of her career has been focused on researching the genealogy and history of the American South. She was married to Gary B. Mills, also an author and historian, who died in 2002.

Mills started her career as the secretary of the American Society of Genealogists (1992–1995). She was the vice president of ASG from 1995 to 1998, and the president from 1998 to 2001.

In 2004, she wrote a historical novel, Isle of Canes, about the Creoles of Cane River in Louisiana.

== Publications ==
- ——— (1981). Natchitoches Colonials: Censuses, Military Rolls and Tax Lists, 1722–1803. Chicago: Adams Press.
- ——— (1997). Evidence!: Citation & Analysis for the Family Historian. Baltimore: Genealogical Publishing Co.
- ——— (2001). Professional Genealogy: A Manual for Researchers, Writers, Editors, Lecturers, and Librarians. Genealogical Publishing Com. ISBN 9780806316482.
- ——— (2015). Evidence Explained: Citing History Sources from Artifacts to Cyberspace. Baltimore: Genealogical Publishing Co.
- ——— (2018). Professional Genealogy: Preparation, Practice & Standards. Baltimore: Genealogical Publishing Co.
