= Coin Coin Chapter Two: Mississippi Moonchile =

Studio album by Matana Roberts
- Released: October 1, 2013
- Recorded: November 28–29, 2012
- Genre: Free jazz; avant-garde jazz
- Length: 48:32
- Label: Constellation

Matana Roberts chronology
Coin Coin Chapter One: Gens de Couleur Libres (2011)	Coin Coin Chapter Two: Mississippi Moonchile (2013)	Feldspar (2014)

Coin Coin Chapter Two: Mississippi Moonchile is a studio album by Matana Roberts. It is the second installment of the 12-part Coin Coin series. It was released by Constellation Records October 1, 2013.

== Reception ==
Professional ratings
Review scores
Source	Rating
AllMusic	4/5 stars
The Free Jazz Collective	5/5 stars
Pitchfork	8.1/10 stars
Spin	9/10 stars
Tiny Mix Tapes	5/5 stars

In a review for AllMusic, Thom Jurek described the album as "a wildly creative, contrasting, and wide-ranging musical theater performance," and wrote: "Even in its relative gentleness, Mississippi Moonchile asks more provocative questions than its predecessor--offering a view of family history and the struggles in juxtaposing the African American Experience with 'freedom' inside the American Dream."

Chris Barton of the Los Angeles Times called the album "a challenging, engrossing listen... spellbinding," and noted Roberts' "synthesis of free improvisation and spoken word into a unique, shape-shifting compositional voice."

Pitchfork's Grayson Haver Currin stated that the net effect of the music "suggests James Baldwin's first novel, Go Tell It on the Mountain, in which the young, black author used a mix of history and fiction to trace the relatives he knew back to the Southern slaves he did not. Baldwin had the written word for his mission; Roberts, a fitting emissary, has a century of jazz."

Writing for The Quietus, Thomas May commented: "Mississippi Moonchile emanates from a place where memory becomes nostalgia and nostalgia melts into fantasy... Primarily interrogating her own sense of identity as an African American woman, Roberts calls upon numerous other voices... to create not historical documents but living artifacts of collective cultural memory."

A writer for Tiny Mix Tapes remarked: "Roberts' work runs deep, not only in the presentation of her music and research, but also through the personalities, the hearts and the souls of every musician she performs with," and noted "how arresting the music can feel as a depiction of times past while cementing Roberts' reputation as a fascinating composer and an incomparable voice of the age."

In an article for The Free Jazz Collective, Martin Schray suggested that "this just might be the most socially relevant music (not just jazz) being made at the moment," and wrote: "In the 1990s Wynton Marsalis attacked Lester Bowie, and with him the Art Ensemble of Chicago and AACM. If he were to hear the coherent mix of traditional music and free improvisation on this album, he might want to bite into his instrument."

Seth Colter Walls of Spin commented: "The way Roberts mixes experimentalism with song-form... makes for that rare balance of 'accessible' and 'innovative'... While it's true that other musicians hailing from the tradition that Roberts grew up around in Chicago... have made recordings that blend classical vocals with out-jazz and populist textures, very few of those work as seamlessly as Mississippi Moonchile."

The Chicago Reader's Peter Margasak called the album "stunning," and stated that Roberts is "carving out her own aesthetic space, one that's startling in its originality and gripping in its historic and social power."

Markus Archer of Self-Titled Magazine remarked: "her music is not defined as free jazz; for me it is free music, ignoring all rules, formulas and boundaries. It frees jazz... again. It doesn't care, and yet, it effectively cares, paying respect to the great visionaries of jazz music... Roberts has important things to say—in her music, her words and her interviews, and that's such a rare thing these days, in every corner of the art world."

Commenting for Jazzwise, Celeste Cantor-Stephens wrote: "Exploring both personal ancestry and collective history, Chapter Two examines the narratives and emotions found within – struggle, celebration, suffering, empowerment, liberty – which are evoked and explored through the group's music... [it] revisits the past with regards to the music itself: a mix of historical and contemporary sound, intertwining genres, timbres and emotion."

== Track listing ==
No.	Title	Length
1.	"Invocation"	4:17
2.	"Humility Draws Down Blue"	1:35
3.	"All Nations"	0:08
4.	"Twelve Sighed"	2:15
5.	"Spares of the World"	2:29
6.	"Secret Covens"	1:45
7.	"River Ruby Dues"	4:21
8.	"Confessor Haste"	1:25
9.	"Amma Jerusalem School"	4:11
10.	"For This Is"	1:04
11.	"Responsory"	3:50
12.	"The Labor of Their Lips"	1:49
13.	"Was the Sacred Day"	4:25
14.	"Lesson"	3:30
15.	"Woman Red Racked"	4:28
16.	"Thanks Be You"	4:25
17.	"Humility Draws Down New"	0:47
18.	"Benediction."	1:59

== Personnel ==
- Matana Roberts: alto saxophone, vocals, conduction, "wordspeak"
- Shoko Nagai: piano, vocals
- Jason Palmer: trumpet, vocals
- Jeremiah Abiah: operatic tenor vocals
- Thomson Kneeland: double bass, vocals
- Tomas Fujiwara: drums, vocals
