= Pat Thomas (pianist) =

English jazz pianist

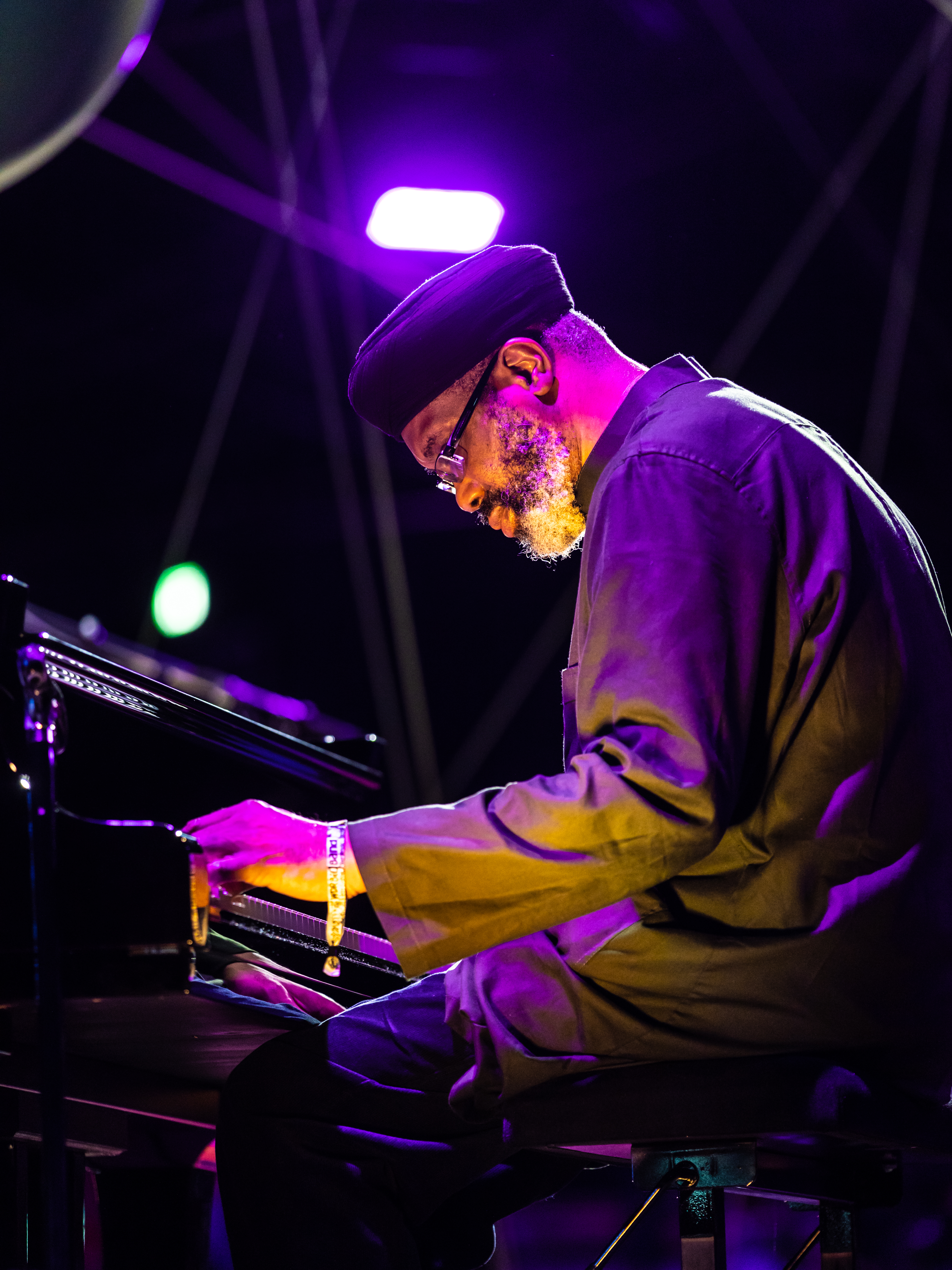
Pat Thomas at the Moers Festival 2022

Pat Thomas (born 27 July 1960) is an experimental pianist from Oxford, England.

== Biography ==
Thomas was born in Oxford and began playing jazz piano at age 16 driven by a fascination for Liberace's instruments. His first album as sole leader was New Jazz Jungle: Remembering, which was released in 1997. He received a Paul Hamlyn Foundation Award for Artists in 2014. Several of his recordings were released in 2019: "from the ruminative post-bop piano trio heard on BleySchool, the free improv of the collective trio Shifa, an exploratory trio with reedist John Butcher and drummer Ståle Liavik Solberg on Fictional Souvenirs and a stunning live solo piano set of Duke Ellington music available digitally from London's Cafe Oto".

Thomas is part of the band أحمد [ahmed], a quartet with Antonin Gerbal, Joel Grip, and Seymour Wright inspired by the music of Ahmed Abdul-Malik. To date, they have released seven albums, all based on live recordings in Europe. New Jazz Imagination was released by Umlaut in 2017 and was followed by Super Majnoon (East Meets West).Their 2026 album, play Monk, diverts from their formula, subjecting Thelonious Monk tunes to their deconstructive approach.

Two Thomas albums were released in 2024: the solo piano The Solar Model of Ibn Al-Shatir (Otoroku) and the electronics-based This Is Trick Step (577).

Thomas came to the U.S. 2025 and played shows in Chicago, Illinois (with Mariam Rezaei at the Renaissance Society) and Knoxville, Tennessee (with أحمد [ahmed] at Big Ears).

== Discography ==
- Pat Thomas, Oile Brice and Gary Willcox: The Day After (JazzNow, 2026)

with أحمد [ahmed]
Title	Label	Year	Time
New Jazz Imagination	OTOROKU	2017	41:30
Nights on Saturn (communication)	Astral Spirits	2021	41:47
Super Majnoon [East Meets West]	OTOROKU	2023	156:57
[Wahid] / [Ahad]	OTOROKU	2022	
Wood Blues	Astral Spirits	2024	58:34
Giant Beauty	OTOROKU	2025	235:12
Sama'a (Audition)	OTOROKU	2025	68:01
play Monk	OTOROKU	2026	129:14
