= Hemophiliac (disambiguation) =

A hemophiliac is a person suffering from haemophilia. It can also refer to:

- Hemophiliac (album)
- Hemophiliac (band)
