= Hôtel du Nord (album) =

Studio album by Mark Feldman & Sylvie Courvoisier
- Released: April 15, 2011
- Recorded: January 3, 2011
- Studio: Sear Sound, New York City
- Genre: Contemporary classical music
- Length: 1:00:16
- Label: Intakt Records Intakt CD 192
- Producer: Mark Feldman, Sylvie Courvoisier, Patrik Landolt

Mark Feldman chronology
Oblivia (2010)	Hôtel du Nord (2011)

Sylvie Courvoisier chronology
Oblivia (2010)	Hôtel du Nord (2011)

Professional ratings
Review scores
Source	Rating
The Guardian	4/5 stars

Hôtel du Nord is a studio album by American violinist Mark Feldman and pianist Sylvie Courvoisier together with drummer Gerry Hemingway and bassist Thomas Morgan. The album was released on the Intakt Records label in 2011. This is the follow-up album for their 2010 To Fly to Steal recorded by the same line-up.

== Reception ==
John Fordham of The Guardian wrote "his album follows up last year's To Fly to Steal, on which Swiss pianist Courvoisier and her former Nashville violinist husband, Feldman, explored a delicate soundworld between free improv and contemporary classical music with the American bass-and-drums pairing of Thomas Morgan and Gerry Hemingway. It was a testament to the empathy of the two leaders, but this compelling session shows how far their new partnership with Morgan and Hemingway (a former Anthony Braxton percussionist) has come. It's full of an ethereal, non‑referential lyricism of the players' own – an affirmation of the power of pattern and audibly evolving relationships, even if very little of it resembles songs – save for Feldman's occasional offhand jazz quotes, like Goodbye Pork Pie Hat which is slipped into a drifting abstract passage."

Glenn Astarita of JazzReview stated "Adventurous expressionism is a key factor within semi-structured or avant jazz-based endeavors. With their second quartet outing for Intakt Records, pianist Sylvie Courvoisier and violinist Mark Feldman cover a gamut of articulately designed modes of interaction. Introspective, sublime and occasionally foreboding, the quartet engineers a potpourri of delicacies, all executed with a deterministic modality."

== Track listing ==
No.	Title	Writer(s)	Length
1.	"Hôtel du Nord"	Feldman	9:53
2.	"Dunes"	Courvoisier	11:37
3.	"Plan A"	Feldman	10:11
4.	"December 2010"	Courvoisier	9:06
5.	"Little Mortise"	Courvoisier, Feldman, Hemingway, Morgan	4:42
6.	"Inceptions"	Courvoisier, Feldman, Hemingway, Morgan	8:32
7.	"Gowanus"	Courvoisier, Feldman, Hemingway, Morgan	6:15
Total length:			01:00:16

== Personnel ==
- Mark Feldman – violin
- Sylvie Courvoisier – piano
- Thomas Morgan – bass
- Gerry Hemingway – drums
