= Surrendered (album) =

Studio album by David S. Ware
- Released: May 23, 2000
- Recorded: October 20 & 21, 1999
- Studio: Avatar (New York, New York)
- Genre: Jazz
- Length: 52:27
- Label: Columbia; CK 63816
- Producer: Steven Joerg

David S. Ware chronology
Go See the World (1998)	Surrendered (2000)	Corridors & Parallels (2001)

Surrendered is an album by jazz saxophonist David S. Ware which was recorded in 1999 and became his second and final release on the Columbia label.

This is the first record by the David S. Ware Quartet with drummer Guillermo E. Brown replacing Susie Ibarra. Ware plays Charles Lloyd's "Sweet Georgia Bright", a piece included on Lloyd's debut Discovery!, and a long rendition of Beaver Harris' composition "African Drums", which Ware originally recorded with the drummer in 1977 as a duo.

== Reception ==
Professional ratings
Review scores
Source	Rating
All About Jazz	4/5 stars
AllMusic	4/5 stars
The Penguin Guide to Jazz Recordings	2.5/4 stars

In his review for AllMusic, David R. Adler states: "David S. Ware's second Columbia release is characteristically aggressive and anguished, but it is not atonal... Ware's music contains more conventional harmony, melody, and rhythm than is often supposed". All About Jazz writer Glenn Astarita wrote: "All in all, Surrendered might truly represent one of Ware’s finest recordings to date as no two songs sound alike which makes for a divergent and noteworthy mix while Steven Joerg’s sharp and insightful production only enhances the overall scenario. In any event, if you’ve been a bit skittish or reluctant to delve into David S. Ware’s musical world, Surrendered might signify an appropriate place to start".

== Track listing ==
All compositions by David S. Ware except as indicated

1. "Peace Celestial" - 8:28
2. "Sweet Georgia Bright" (Charles Lloyd) - 5:15
3. "Theme of Ages" - 7:44
4. "Surrendered" - 7:58
5. "Glorified Calypso" - 6:02
6. "African Drums" (Beaver Harris) - 16:53

== Personnel ==
- David S. Ware – tenor sax
- Matthew Shipp – piano
- William Parker – bass
- Guillermo E. Brown – drums
