= Birthmark (disambiguation) =

A birthmark is a blemish on the skin formed before birth.

Birthmark or Birthmarks may also refer to:

- Birthmark (musician), an American musician
- Birthmark (episode), from the television series Teen Titans
- Birthmarks (episode), from the television series House

== Albums ==
- Birthmark (Lotte Anker album), 2013
- Birthmarks (Ozark Henry album), 2001
- Birthmarks (Born Ruffians album), 2013
- Birthmarks (Bambara album), 2025

== See also ==
- "The Birth-Mark", a romantic short story written by Nathaniel Hawthorne in 1846
