= Beyond the Mist =

Beyond the Mist may refer to:

- Beyond the Mist (Lotte Anker album)
- Beyond the Mist (Robin Trower album)
