= Entomological Reflections =

Studio album by Mephista
- Released: May 25, 2004
- Recorded: November 11, 2003
- Genre: Avant-garde, contemporary classical music, jazz
- Length: 56:17
- Label: Tzadik; TZ 7711
- Producer: Mephista

Mephista chronology
Black Narcissus (2002)	Entomological Reflections (2004)

Sylvie Courvoisier chronology
Abaton (2003)	Entomological Reflections (2004)	Malphas: Book of Angels Volume 3 (2006)

Entomological Reflections is an album by the group Mephista, which comprises pianist Sylvie Courvoisier, electronic artist Ikue Mori and percussionist Susie Ibarra, which was released on the Tzadik label in 2004.

== Reception ==
Professional ratings
Review scores
Source	Rating
AllMusic	4/5 stars

Sean Westergaard of AllMusic stated, "Each of these players has a highly individual voice on her respective instrument, and together they are three of the finest improvising women on the scene. This album isn't likely to get any toes tapping, but will reward careful listening."

== Track listing ==
All compositions by Mephista except as indicated

1. "La Femme 100 Têtes" - 2:46
2. "House" (Ikue Mori) - 3:18
3. "Drôle de Mots" (Sylvie Courvoisier) - 5:31
4. "Cardiogram" (Courvoisier) - 5:46
5. "Void" - 3:44
6. "Fractions" - 3:46
7. "Entomological Souvenirs" - 2:53
8. "La Château de Cène" - 4:49
9. "Fringe" - 1:49
10. "Procession" (Susie Ibarra) - 4:10
11. "Beloukia" - 2:44
12. "Air" (Ibarra) - 5:21
13. "Apartment" (Mori) - 0:46
14. "Sans Mots" (Courvoisier) - 4:43
15. "Shifting Roll" (Mori) - 4:11

== Personnel ==
- Sylvie Courvoisier – piano
- Ikue Mori – laptop
- Susie Ibarra – drums
