= Signs and Epigrams =

Studio album by Sylvie Courvoisier
- Released: April 24, 2007
- Recorded: December 8, 2006
- Genre: Contemporary classical music
- Length: 53:25
- Label: Tzadik TZ 8033
- Producer: Mark Feldman

Sylvie Courvoisier chronology
Malphas: Book of Angels Volume 3 (2006)	Signs and Epigrams (2007)	Lonelyville (2007)

Signs and Epigrams is a solo album by pianist Sylvie Courvoisier which was released on the Tzadik label in 2007.

== Reception ==
Professional ratings
Review scores
Source	Rating
Allmusic	4/5 stars
The Penguin Guide to Jazz Recordings	4/4 stars

In his review for Allmusic, Blair Sanderson notes that "What makes Signs and Epigrams compelling for intrepid listeners is the density of Courvoisier's constructions, the audacious ways she exploits her materials, and the utter ferocity of her performances. While she demonstrates a fine ear for isolated pitches or the quiet, delicate interplay of lines, and can play conventionally with great subtlety, she makes the greatest impression in her brutal attacks of the keyboard, strings, and even the piano's case: the rawest sound sources are fair game in her highly varied pieces, and she plays with a concentrated force that makes this album bracing to hear and unforgettable for its violence".

== Track listing ==
All compositions by Sylvie Courvoisier

1. "Ricochet" - 2:25
2. "Des Signes et des Songes" - 5:11
3. "Meccania" - 7:57
4. "Epigram 1" - 6:33
5. "Epigram 2" - 3:35
6. "Epigram 3" - 4:20
7. "Confins de Lueurs" - 7:36
8. "Chick" - 2:56
9. "Mis en Pièces" - 2:09
10. "Soliloquy" - 10:44

== Personnel ==
- Sylvie Courvoisier - piano
