= Timuçin =

Timuçin is the Turkish spelling of the Mongol masculine given name Temüjin, which was the birth name of Genghis Khan. Notable people with the name include:

- Timuçin Esen (born 1973), Turkish actor
- Timuçin Şahin (born 1973), Turkish jazz guitarist
- Timuçin Fabian Kwong Wah Aluo (born 1987), English DJ professionally known as Jax Jones
