= Alien Huddle =

Studio album by Lotte Anker, Sylvie Courvoisier, Ikue Mori
- Released: 2008
- Recorded: December 9, 2006
- Studios: Avatar Studio, New York City
- Genre: Jazz
- Length: 47:10
- Label: Intakt
- Producer: Lotte Anker

Lotte Anker chronology
Triptych (2005)	Alien Huddle (2008)	Live at the Loft (2009)

Alien Huddle is an album by a free improvisation trio consisting of Danish saxophonist Lotte Anker, Swiss pianist Sylvie Courvoisier and Japanese electronic artist Ikue Mori, which was recorded in 2006 and released by Intakt Records. It takes its title from a large wooden sculpture by Martin Puryear. The eleven improvisations are inspired by bird songs. Courvoisier and Mori collaborated in two projects previously: Courvoisier's Lonelyville and the improvising trio Mephista with Susie Ibarra.

== Reception ==
Professional ratings
Review scores
Source	Rating
All About Jazz	4/5 stars
All About Jazz	4/5 stars
The Free Jazz Collective	4/5 stars

In a review for All About Jazz, Ted Gordon states "The most interesting creation of this particular group, besides the very clear gestures of emotion and communication, is that its roles switch constantly: in this album's textural huddle, it's the collective output that trumps the individual's contribution." AAJ's Nic Jones wrote: "It's music worthy of deep listening, which is true of the entire program. Leaving the everyday, even as it rewards the effort of doing so, the profundity of the moment also reaches exalted status, making for music that's urgently alive even while it's shot through with contemplation."

The Point of Departure review by Stuart Broomer notes that "While the trio of Anker's saxophones, Courvoisier's often prepared piano and Mori's electronics might seem unusual, the three immediately adapt certain practices that can suggest it's the most normal grouping in the world."

Stef Gijssels of The Free Jazz Collective commented: "The interactions are organic, immediate, full of surprises and wild thought jumps. Despite the similarity of approach throughout the album, each track has its own coherence and unique identity. The music is unusual, but it has an intense and highly concentrated beauty."

Ken Waxman of Jazz Word wrote: "Unfolding through 11 shorter improvisations... the three women trace, stroke and caress the multiple textures that results from the properties of each instrument... the sounds on Alien Huddle ripple, wiggle and slither... most of the... CD revolves around low-frequency keyboard fantasia, choked sighs and peeps from the saxophones and crackles, growls, pulses and loops from the electronics."

== Track listing ==
All compositions by Anker/Courvoisier/Mori

1. "Morning Dove" – 4:17
2. "Woodpecker Peeks" – 3:58
3. "Sparkling Sparrows" – 5:09
4. "Night Owl" – 5:31
5. "Robins Quarrel" – 3:45
6. "Dancing Rooster Comp" – 4:51
7. "Whistling Swan" – 4:09
8. "Crow and Raven" – 1:58
9. "Blackbird" – 5:15
10. "Ostrich War" – 3:50
11. "Great White Heron" – 4:15

== Personnel ==
- Lotte Anker – soprano sax, alto sax, tenor sax
- Sylvie Courvoisier – piano
- Ikue Mori – electronics
