= 50th Birthday Celebration Volume Six =

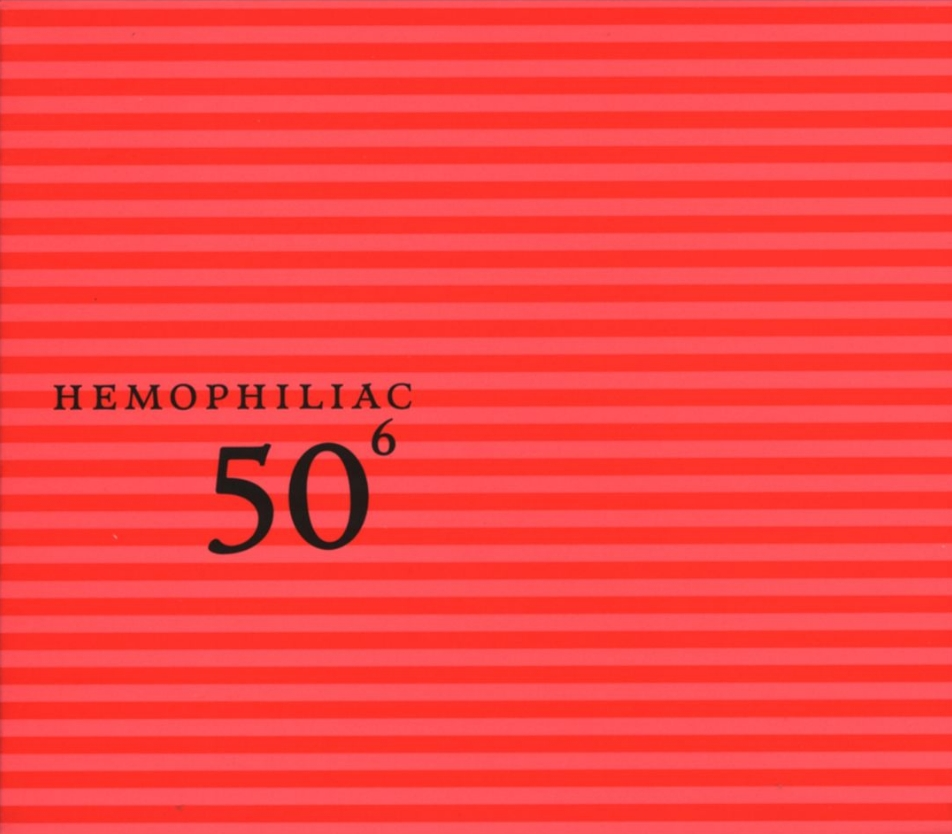

Live album by Hemophiliac
- Released: August 24, 2004
- Recorded: September 1, 2003
- Length: 49:50
- Labels: Tzadik; TZ 5006
- Producer: John Zorn

John Zorn chronology
50th Birthday Celebration Volume 5 (2004)	50th Birthday Celebration Volume Six (2004)	50th Birthday Celebration Volume 7 (2004)

Hemophiliac chronology
Hemophiliac (2002)	50th Birthday Celebration Volume 6 (2004)

50th Birthday Celebration Volume Six is a live album of improvised music by Hemophiliac—consisting of Mike Patton, Ikue Mori and John Zorn—documenting their performance at Tonic by Daniel Goldaracena in September 2003 as part of Zorn's month-long 50th Birthday Celebration concert series.

== Reception ==
Professional ratings
Review scores
Source	Rating
AllMusic	4/5 stars

The Allmusic site rated the album 4 stars.

== Track listing ==
No.	Title	Length
1.	"@:◊:@"	7:26
2.	"+(=&)+"	7:02
3.	"\/\/\///\/\/\/\\/\///\\/\"	4:43
4.	"‡*§†*§‡"	9:33
5.	"<<-^->>"	9:45
6.	"´·ˇ,’”¨¸˛«˜¬˘˙»°˝"	6:14
7.	"[]≈[]≈[]≈[]"	5:01

== Personnel ==
- John Zorn – alto saxophone
- Ikue Mori – laptop electronics
- Mike Patton – voice
