= Jacques Demierre =

Swiss pianist

Jacques Demierre (born 4 January 1954, in Geneva) is a Swiss improvisation musician and composer.

== Life and works ==
Demierre studied at the University of Geneva at the Conservatoire Populaire (piano, jazz piano, electroacoustic music) and at the Conservatoire de Musique de Genève (music theory). Soon, he gave up the classic piano and tended to the avant-garde rock and improvised jazz. As a pianist, he played with Dorothea Schürch, Radu Malfatti, and also with Martial Solal, Han Bennink, Joëlle Léandre, Carlos Zingaro and Ikue Mori. He performed regularly solo concerts and worked also in a trio with Lucas Niggli and Barry Guy and also with Urs Leimgruber and Barre Phillips. Sylvie Courvoisier, Malcolm Braff and Michel Wintsch were his students.

Demierre changed his way as a composer to the border of jazz, free improvisation and contemporary music, because he was interested in mixing the improvised music tradition with notated music.
