= Abaton (disambiguation) =

An abaton is a sacred place, which is not accessible to most people; usually in reference to a monastery.

Abaton may also refer to:

- Adyton, an inaccessible religious building (or part of a building)
  - A building at the Asclepion in Epidaurus
  - A temple on the island of Bigeh, in the Nile river
  - A monument erected by Artemisia II of Caria after the conquest of Rhodes
- Abaton (album), 2003, by pianist Sylvie Courvoisier
- Abaton, a 2017 film from Nathaniel Dorsky's Arboretum Cycle
