= Go See the World =

Studio album by David S. Ware
- Released: September 22, 1998
- Recorded: December 11 & 12, 1997; Sound on Sound Studio, New York City
- Genre: Jazz
- Length: 67:41
- Label: Columbia; CK 69138
- Producer: Steven Joerg

David S. Ware chronology
| Wisdom of Uncertainty (1997) | Go See the World (1998) | Surrendered (1998) |

Go See the World is an album by American jazz saxophonist David S. Ware which was recorded in 1997 and became his first release on the Columbia label.

== Background ==
In late 1997, Ware was signed to the Columbia label by Branford Marsalis. Ware says "Branford caught my show at Vienne, France 1995, and he really dug what he heard. He was sincerely moved by the music, which he hadn't heard before." Two years later, when Marsalis was named the new creative director of the jazz division at Columbia, he called Ware up. According to Ware, "Branford wanted to record my group in our own setting, performing the music of our choosing. It was encouraging of course, and we were given total creative freedom in the studio, no compromises, and the promise of better distribution that we'd ever had before."

== Reception ==
Professional ratings
Review scores
| Source | Rating |
|---|---|
| AllMusic | 4/5 stars |
| The Penguin Guide to Jazz | 4/4 stars |

In his review for AllMusic, Thom Jurek states "David S. Ware's debut album on Columbia Records proper (Columbia had licensed an earlier title from DIW) is perhaps the most "accessible" of his career thus far... Ware has gone and seen the world, and he's found it heartbreakingly beautiful, able to be understood only by the utterance of music". All About Jazz writer Glenn Astarita said "David S. Ware has honed a unique voice on the tenor saxophone and consistently receives astonishing support from a very accomplished band. We wish him the best of luck with Columbia Records". The Penguin Guide to Jazz states "More accommodating than its predecessor [Godspellized], it is no less compelling, and is exquisitely recorded. This is the John Coltrane Quartet of the late '90s, the only difference being that the Jimmy Garrison role has been upgraded dramatically."

== Track listing ==
All compositions by David S. Ware except as indicated

1. "Mikuro's Blues" - 6:04
2. "Lexicon" - 10:22
3. "Logistic" - 9:51
4. "The Way We Were" (Marvin Hamlisch, Alan Bergman, Marilyn Bergman) - 14:34
5. "Quadrahex" - 4:42
6. "Estheticmetric" - 11:30
7. "Rapturelodic" - 10:38

== Personnel ==
- David S. Ware – tenor sax
- Matthew Shipp – piano
- William Parker – bass
- Susie Ibarra – drums
