= Sylvie Courvoisier =

Swiss musician (born 1968)

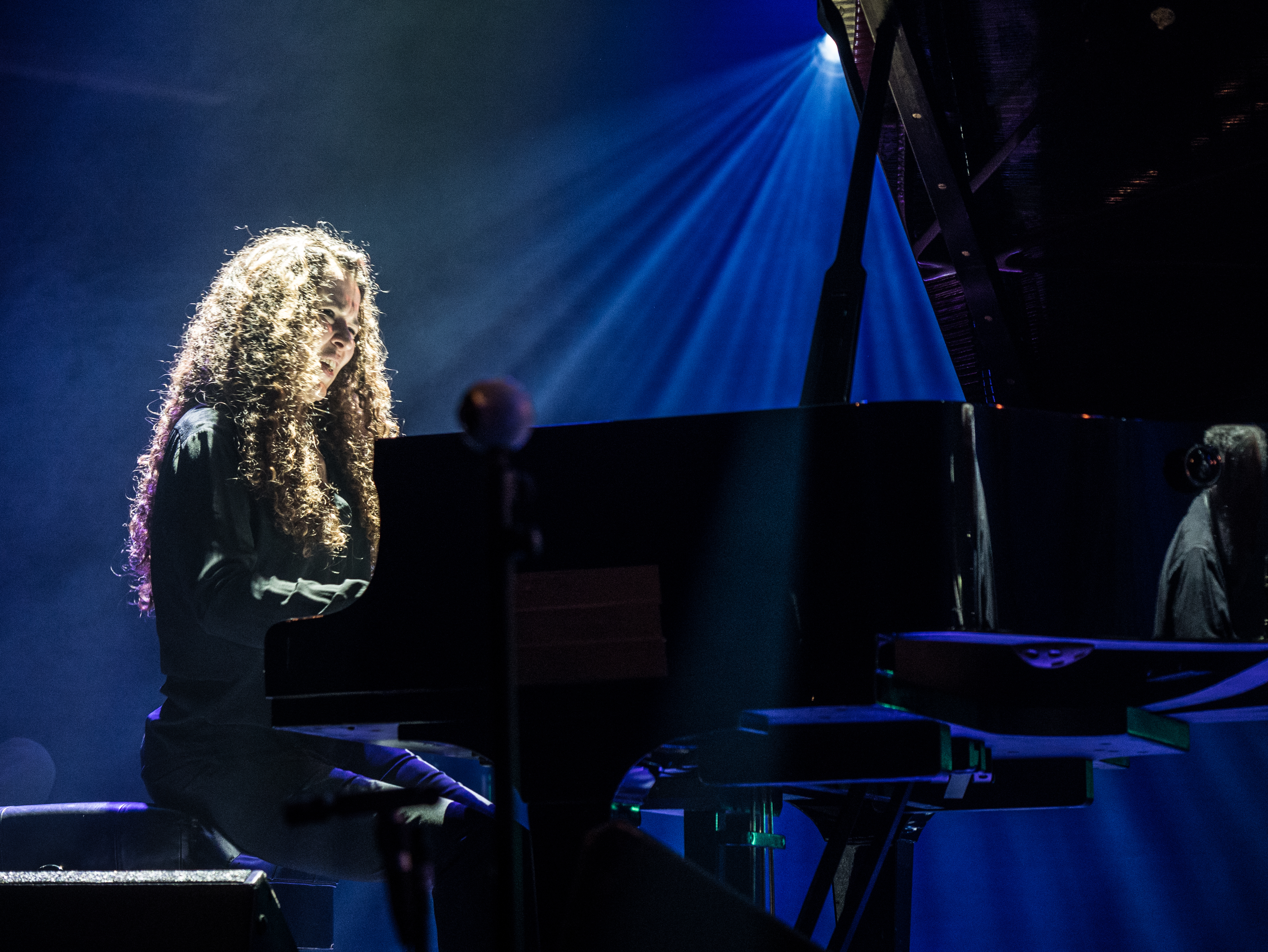
- Courvoisier at the Moers Festival 2017

Background information
- Born: November 30, 1968 (age 57)
- Origin: Lausanne, Switzerland
- Occupations: Composer, musician
- Instrument: Piano
- Labels: Enja, Intakt, Tzadik, ECM
- Formerly of: Mephista
- Website: sylviecourvoisier.com

Sylvie Courvoisier (born 30 November 1968) is a Swiss American composer, pianist, improviser and bandleader. She was born and raised in Lausanne, Switzerland, and has been a resident of New York City since 1998. She won Germany’s International Jazz Piano Prize in 2022 , the Swiss Grand Prix and The American Academy of Arts and Letters Music Award in 2025.

Courvoisier has earned her renown for balancing two distinct worlds: the classically minded chamber music of her European roots and the grooving, hook-laden sounds of the avant-jazz scene in New York. She ranges from playing with her longtime jazz trio (featuring bassist Drew Gress and drummer Kenny Wollesen ) to performing Stravinsky’s Rite of Spring in league with new-music pianist Cory Smythe, among other genre-bounding ventures. Courvoisier has collaborated over the past two decades with such luminaries as John Zorn, Wadada Leo Smith, Evan Parker, Ikue Mori, Ned Rothenberg, Fred Frith, Mark Feldman, Christian Fennesz, Israel Galván and Mary Halvorson. Courvoisier has toured the world from Europe and North America to South America, Asia and Australia. She teaches as a member of the faculty of New School of Jazz (The New School)., in New York City.

== Early life and career ==
Courvoisier studied classical music at the Conservatory of Lausanne and jazz at the Conservatory of Montreux. Her father was an amateur jazz pianist, and she attended jazz summer camps in Siena, Italy, in her youth. Following work in Europe that earned her Switzerland’s Prix des Jeunes Créateurs in 1996, Courvoisier moved to Brooklyn two years later.

After leading some Swiss bands — yielding the albums Sauvagerie Courtoise (Unit Records, 1994), Ocre: Music for Barrel Organ, Piano, Tuba and Percussion (Enja, 1997) and Y2K (Enja, 2000) — Courvoisier formed a long-term partnership with American improvising violinist Mark Feldman. The pair toured the world and recorded extensively as a duo, with their initial releases including Music for Violin & Piano (Avan, 1999) and two albums featuring music by composer John Zorn: Masada Recital (Tzadik, 2004) and Malphas (Tzadik, 2006). In 2004, ECM released Courvoisier’s double-CD Abaton, which presented her compositions for a trio with Feldman and cellist Erik Friedlander on one disc and the trio’s group improvisations on the other. Zorn’s label Tzadik released Courvoisier’s first solo recording, Signs and Epigrams, in 2007.

For the album Lonelyville (Intakt, 2007), Courvoisier recorded a suite she composed for a quintet with Feldman, Ikue Mori on electronics, Vincent Courtois on cello and Gerald Cleaver on drums. The Courvoisier-Feldman duo went on to release the albums Oblivia (Tzadik, 2010) and Live at the Theatre Vidy-Lausanne (Intakt, 2013). The two musicians also co-led a hard-touring quartet that recorded three albums: To Fly To Steal (Intakt, 2010, with bassist Thomas Morgan and drummer Gerry Hemingway), Hotel du Nord (Intakt, 2011, with Morgan and Hemingway), and Birdies for Lulu (Intakt, 2014, with bassist Scott Colley and drummer Billy Mintz).

Courvoisier’s other early collaborations in New York included recording a duo-piano album with Jacques Demierre, Deux Pianos (Intakt, 2000), and featuring on John Zorn’s Cobra (Tzadik, 2002), Femina (Tzadik, 2009) and Dictée/Liber Novus (Tzadik, 2010). Courvoisier recorded two albums as a member of the improvising trio collective Mephista with Ikue Mori on electronics and Susie Ibarra on drums: Black Narcissus (Tzadik, 2002) and Entomological Reflections (Tzadik, 2004). Courvoisier also recorded Every So Often, a duo release with saxophonist Ellery Eskelin (Prime Source, 2008), and As Soon As Possible, featuring Eskelin and Vincent Courtois (CamJazz, 2008). In 2013, Courvoisier played with Mori on Erik Friedlander’s Claws & Wings (Skipstone), and the following year, she released a duo disc with saxophonist Evan Parker, Either Or And (Relative Pitch).

== Trio with Drew Gress & Kenny Wollesen ==
Courvoisier performs in a trio with bassist Drew Gress and drummer Kenny Wollesen. The trio has toured on both sides of the Atlantic and recorded four albums.

Courvoisier’s first trio album with Gress and Wollesen, Double Windsor (Tzadik), was named one of the best albums of 2014 by both Slate and New York City Jazz Record; it also received the “CHOC” distinction from Jazz Magazine and Jazzman in France. International Piano magazine hailed Double Windsor as “a highly original recording, boldly juxtaposing the freely improvised and the through-composed, and crackling with energy.

The trio’s second album, D’Agala (Intakt, 2018), received positive reviews from critics, garnering a four-star review in DownBeat. In its review, JazzTimes described the record as “a wonderland of piano-trio surrealism that is nonetheless grounded in rhythmic earthiness.” It was ranked as one of the year’s best jazz albums by The New York Times and Los Angeles Times, as well as New York City Jazz Record. In his liner notes to D’Agala, NPR jazz critic Kevin Whitehead compared the venturesome interaction of this trio with the infectious music of a pioneering jazz figure from the 1950s: “There is something Herbie Nichols-like about the Courvoisier-Gress-Wollesen trio’s feel: collective music-making as light-on-its-feet fun; it’s genuine trio music in which bass and drums are full partners with piano.”

In 2020, Courvoisier, Gress and Wollesen released their third album as a trio: Free Hoops (Intakt). Whitehead, in his liner notes for this album, went into colorful detail about the range of atmosphere explored by the group: “This music harbors a misterioso, dreamlike quality… induced by a wistful ostinato or moonlit piano arpeggio, or by a quiet episode that underscores the depth of the trio’s sonic space, as when a slapped-strings piano bass cluster explodes into the void. They also do that good stuff we prize jazz for: the happy swinging, the coming together when they make complex material sing.” The critical response was again widely positive, with All About Jazz saying: “The three musicians work together so sympathetically that it can be easy to forget just how challenging these compositions are, and how much coordinated artistry is required to bring them to life.”

Courvoisier’s newest ensemble, Chimaera, released its eponymous debut album in October 2023 on Intakt Records. The atmospheric, shape-shifting Chimaera features the pianist alongside Wadada Leo Smith on trumpet, Christian Fennesz on guitar/electronics, Nate Wooley on trumpet, Drew Gress on double-bass, and Kenny Wollesen on drums and vibraphone. Chimaera has a flexible lineup on tour, with drummer Nasheet Waits on board for an expanded rhythm section.

== Further Collaborations ==
Over the years, Courvoisier has worked in concert halls, jazz clubs and international festivals around the world with such musicians as Yusef Lateef, Tony Oxley, Tim Berne, Joey Baron, Joëlle Léandre, Herb Robertson, Mark Dresser, Lotte Anker, Michel Godard, Tomasz Stanko and Butch Morris. Courvoisier has also collaborated with the photographer Mario Del Curto on Lueurs d’ailleurs, an evening-length event of solo piano plus visuals, and she has recorded the music of such composers as Cecil Taylor, Earle Brown and Sacha Argov.

Among Courvoisier’s key latter-day duo partners is guitarist Mary Halvorson. In 2017, the pair released Crop Circles via Relative Pitch, with DownBeat setting up its four-star review of the album by describing them as “two of New York’s most distinctive improvisers,” going on to extol the music’s “deft, interactive intimacy.” The team released their second album, Searching for the Disappeared Hour, in 2021 through Pyroclastic. Adding to plaudits from The New York Times and other outlets, All About Jazz described the record as “a mixture of dark moods and brooding quiet, studded with gritty bits of noise and drama… The sounds they make here are familiar and alien at the same time.”

Beyond their touring quartet, Courvoisier and Feldman also recorded two fully improvised albums showcasing different foursomes: with Evan Parker and Ikue Mori on Miller’s Tale (Intakt, 2016) and with saxophonist Ingrid Laubrock and drummer Tom Rainey on TISM (RogueArt, 2019). With multi-reeds player Ned Rothenberg, Courvoisier and Feldman also recorded the fully improvised trio disc In Cahoots (Clean Feed, 2016). Courvoisier joined a quartet with trumpeter Nate Wooley, drummer Tom Rainey and saxophonist Ken Vandermark that recorded the 2018 album Noise of Our Time for Intakt, with Courvoisier contributing three compositions. The pianist has also worked in Wooley’s Battles Pieces quartet alongside Laubrock and vibraphonist Matt Moran, the group recording three albums together for Relative Pitch.

In 2019, the Courvoisier-Feldman duo released its final album, Time Gone Out (Intakt), with the composition of its music supported by a Chamber Music of America New Jazz Work commission. The JazzTimes review of Time Gone Out singled out Courvoisier’s pianism as “staggering… She draws on both low-end thunder and upper-register lyricism, often simultaneously.”

Courvoisier collaborated on a decade-long series of projects with Israel Galván, the Spanish dancer and choreographer. Their most recent work is La Consagraciòn de la Primavera, which combined a two-piano interpretation of Stravinsky’s original score for piano four-hands of Le Sacre du Printemps (The Rite of Spring) with Spectre d’un Songe, Courvoisier’s own, complementary two-piano piece. Courvoisier, alongside fellow pianist Cory Smythe, premiered the program with Galván in November 2019 at the Théâtre Vidy in Lausanne and January 2020 at the Théâtre de la Ville in Paris. More recently, the two pianists have been touring both works in music-only performances, having released an album pairing them in 2021 through Pyroclastic Records. The New York Times highlighted the recording as “a real contribution” to the varied, century-long history of Le Sacre on disc, enthusing over the pair “working magic” with their interpretation. As for Courvoisier’s Spectre d’un Songe, the review described the music as “by turns intense and languorous… a key entry in Courvoisier’s growing composer-performer discography.”

== Commissions, Awards ==
Courvoisier has been commissioned to write music for the theater, radio and concert hall. Her concert works include a Concerto for Electric Guitar and Chamber Orchestra, as well as Balbutiements for vocal quartet and soprano. She has written to commissions from the Theatre Vidy-Lausanne, Pro Helvetia and Germany’s Donaueschingen Musiktage Festival. She has also received commissions from Chamber Music America’s New Jazz Works (2016) and The Shifting Foundation (2019, 2020, 2021).

Courvoisier has been honored with awards such as the New York Foundation for the Arts (2013), le Grand Prix de la Fondation Vaudoise pour la Culture (2010), the SUISA Prize for Jazz (2017), the Foundation for Contemporary Arts Grants to Artists (2018), the Swiss Music Prize (2018), the United States Artist Fellow (2020), the Deutche Jazzpreis piano international ( 2022), the American Academy of Arts and Letters (2025) and the Swiss Music Grand Prix (2025).

== Selected discography ==
=== As leader ===
Year recorded	Title	Label	Notes
1994	Sauvagerie Courtoise	Unit Records	Quintet, with Guglielmo Pagnozzi (sax), Lauro Rossi (trombone), Pascal Portner (drums), Banz Oester (bass)
1996	Ocre	Enja	Quintet, with Michel Godard (tuba), Pierre Charial (barrel organ), Mark Nauseef (drums), Tony Overwater (bass)
2000	Y2K	Enja	Trio, with Michel Godard (tuba), Pierre Charial (barrel organ)
2003	Abaton	ECM -Double album -	Trio, with Mark Feldman (violin), Erik Friedlander (cello)
2007	Signs and Epigrams	Tzadik	Solo piano
2008	Lonelyville	Intakt	Quintet, with Ikue Mori (electronics), Mark Feldman (violin), Vincent Courtois (cello), Gerald Cleaver (drums)
2014	Double Windsor	Tzadik	Trio, with Drew Gress (bass), Kenny Wollesen (drums)
2018	D'Agala	Intakt	Trio, with Drew Gress (bass), Kenny Wollesen (drums)
2020	Free Hoops	Intakt	Trio, with Drew Gress (bass), Kenny Wollesen (drums)
2021	Searching for the disappeared hour	Pyroclastic	Duo, with Mary Halvorson (guitar)
2023	The Rite of Spring – Spectre d'un Songe	Pyroclastic	Duo, with Cory Smythe (piano)
2023	Chimaera	Intakt	Quintet, with Wadada Leo Smith (trp), Christian Fennesz ( guitar& electronics), Nate Wooley ( trp), Drew Gress (bass), Kenny Wollesen (drums, vibraphone)
2024	To Be Other-Wise	Intakt	Solo piano
2025	Bone Bells	Pyroclastic	Duo, with Mary Halvorson (guitar)
2025	Angel Falls	Intakt	Duo, with Wadada Leo Smith (trumpet)
2026	Éclats- Live In Europe	Intakt	Trio, with Drew Gress (bass), Kenny Wollesen (drums)

=== As co-leader ===
With Mary Halvorson

- Crop Circles with Mary Halvorson (Relative Pitch, 2017)
- Searching for the Disappeared Hour with Mary Halvorson (Pyroclastic, 2021)
- Bone Bells with Mary Halvorson (Pyroclastic, 2025)

With Ned Rothenberg

- In Cahoots with Mark Feldman, Ned Rothenberg (Clean Feed, 2016)
- Lockdown with Ned Rothenberg, Julian Sartorius (Clean Feed, 2021)
- Crossing Four with Ned Rothenberg, Mary Halvorson, Tomas Fujiwara (Clean Feed, 2023)

With Mark Feldman

- Music for Violin and Piano with Mark Feldman (Avant, 1999)
- To Fly to Steal – Sylvie Courvoisier-Mark Feldman Quartet with Thomas Morgan and Gerry Hemingway (Intakt 2010)
- Oblivia with Mark Feldman (Tzadik, 2010)
- Hôtel du Nord – Sylvie Courvoisier–Mark Feldman Quartet with Thomas Morgan and Gerry Hemingway (Intakt, 2011)
- Live at Theatre Vidy–Lausanne – Sylvie Courvoisier–Mark Feldman Duo (Intakt, 2013)
- Birdies for Lulu–Sylvie Courvoisier–Mark Feldman Quartet with Scott Colley and Billy Mintz (Intakt, 2014)
- Miller's Tale–Sylvie Courvoisier–Mark Feldman - Evan Parker- Ikue Mori (Intakt, 2016)
- Tism with Mark Feldman, Ingrid Laubrock, Tom Rainey (Rogueart, 2019)
- Time Gone Out – Sylvie Courvoisier–Mark Feldman Duo (Intakt, 2019)

With Mephista (Courvoisier, Ikue Mori and Susie Ibarra)

- Black Narcissus (Tzadik, 2002)
- Entomological Reflections (Tzadik, 2004)

With others

- Birds of a feather with Mark Nauseef (Unit Records, 1997)
- Lavin with Lucas Niggli (Intakt, 1999)
- Deux Pianos with Jacques Demierre (Intakt, 2000)
- Passaggio with Joelle Leandre, Susie Ibarra (Intakt, 2002)
- Alien Huddle with Ikue Mori, Lotte Anker (Intakt, 2008)
- Every So Often with Ellery Eskelin (Prime Source, 2010)
- As Soon as Possible with Courtois, Eskelin (CAM Jazz, 2010)
- Either Or And with Evan Parker (Relative Pitch Records, 2014)
- Salt Task with Chris Corsano, Nate Wooley (Relative Pitch, 2016)
- Noise of our Time with Ken Vandermark, Tom Rainey, Nate Wooley, (Intakt, 2018)
- Hoodoos with Jacques Demierre (Catalytic, 2019)
- Angel Falls with Wadada Leo Smith (Intakt, 2025)

=== As sidewoman ===
With John Zorn

- Cobra: John Zorn's Game Pieces Volume 2 (Tzadik, 2002)
- Masada Recital (Tzadik, 2004)
- Malphas: Book of Angels Volume 3 (Tzadik, 2006)
- Femina (Tzadik, 2009)
- Dictée/Liber Novus (Tzadik, 2010)

With Erik Friedlander

- 50 Miniatures for Improvising Quintet (Skipstone, 2010)
- Claws and Wings (Skipstone, 2013)

With Herb Robertson

- Real Aberration (Clean Feed, 2005)
- Elaboration (Clean Feed, 2007)

With Nate Wooley

- Nate Wooley Battle Piece (Relative Pitch Records, 2015)
- Nate Wooley Battle Piece II (Relative Pitch, 2017)
- Nate Wooley Battle Piece vI (Relative Pitch, 2018)
- Nate Wooley Mutual Aid Music ( 2021)

== Literature ==
- Rosset, Dominique: Au carrefour des mondes. La compositrice et pianiste lausannoise Sylvie Courvoisier. Zurich 2005.
