= Orodruin (disambiguation) =

Orodruin is an alternative name for Mount Doom, a fictional location in J. R. R. Tolkien's The Lord of the Rings.

Orodruin may also refer to:

- Orodruin (band), a doom metal band
- "Orodruin", a song by Sylvie Courvoisier from the 2003 album Abaton
