= Claws and Wings =

Studio album by Erik Friedlander
- Released: October 1, 2013
- Recorded: 2013
- Studio: 2nd Story Sound, NYC
- Genre: Avant-garde, jazz, Americana, contemporary classical music
- Length: 44:50
- Label: Skipstone; SSR016
- Producer: Erik Friedlander

Erik Friedlander chronology
| American Power (2012) | Claws and Wings (2013) | Nothing On Earth (2013) |

Claws and Wings is an album by cellist Erik Friedlander which was released in 2013 on the Skipstone label. The album was composed by Friedlander in tribute to his late wife and while recovering from an injury which left him unable to play cello.

== Reception ==
In JazzTimes Lloyd Sachs wrote " a soulful inner strength resonates through this delicately textured, lyrically assertive work, which teams Friedlander with a pair of familiar collaborators in pianist Sylvie Courvoisier and electronics artist Ikue Mori. Claws and Wings is both a loving portrait of Lynn Shapiro, a choreographer and poet who sometimes collaborated with her husband, and a moody portrait of memory, with its fleeting images, quick transitions from joy to sorrow and odd connections". Writing for All About Jazz, Troy Collins observed "For this unusual set, Friedlander is joined by two of the Downtown scene's most remarkable female improvisers—pianist Sylvie Courvoisier and electronic percussionist Ikue Mori. Courvoisier's adroit virtuosity provides the perfect accompaniment to Friedlander's sinuous lyricism, her neo-classical technique finding sympathetic accord in the leader's straightforward approach. Mori, on the other hand, is the date's wildcard, conjuring a kaleidoscopic array of beguiling textures from her laptop that imbue the proceedings with a surreal, cinematic air".

== Track listing ==
All compositions by Erik Friedlander.

1. "Frail As a Breeze Part I" - 6:31
2. "Frail As a Breeze Part II" - 9:03
3. "Dreams of Your Leaving" - 2:42
4. "Dancer" - 4:47
5. "Reaching Back" - 2:48
6. "Swim With Me" - 8:37
7. "Insomnia" - 5:17
8. "Cheek to Cheek" - 5:05

== Personnel ==
- Erik Friedlander – cello
- Sylvie Courvoisier – piano, spinet
- Ikue Mori – laptop
