= Bonebridge =

Studio album by Erik Friedlander
- Released: 2011
- Recorded: January 24 & 25, 2008; Excello Studios
- Genre: Avant-garde, jazz, Americana, contemporary classical music
- Length: 48:41
- Label: Skipstone 010
- Producer: Erik Friedlander

Erik Friedlander chronology
50 Miniatures for Improvising Quintet (2010)	Bonebridge (2011)	American Power (2012)

Bonebridge is an album by cellist Erik Friedlander which was released in 2011 on the Skipstone label.

== Reception ==
Professional ratings
Review scores
Source	Rating
Allmusic	4/5 stars
PopMatters	7/10 stars

Allmusic rated the album with 4 stars out of 5. PopMatters correspondent John Garrett concluded the album was "Recommended for anyone looking to bridge their jazz and Americana tastes".

Down Beat editor Frank Alkyner said "it's the musicianship and kinship of these four musicians that make Bonebridge an absolute listening joy". Writing for All About Jazz, Troy Collins noted "Bonebridge knits together a colorful patchwork of Americana that extends the sentimental resonance of rural folk traditions into exploratory new territory". No Depression's Victor S. Aaron stated "Friedlander wanted to make a string music record, and he made a dandy one at that. The idea of putting together these two instruments from different musical worlds worked better than you think it might. The secret of this success comes from the leader himself: Friedlander's distinctive playing style is very melody-savvy and his unmatched plucking technique approximates the nimbleness of a well fingerpicked guitar"

== Track listing ==
All compositions by Erik Friedlander

1. "Low Country Cupola" – 6:13
2. "Beaufain Street" – 4:55
3. "Transpontine" – 5:37
4. "The Reverend" – 6:10
5. "Caribou Narrows" – 7:23
6. "Tabatha" – 4:56
7. "Hanky Panky" – 6:26
8. "Bridge to Nowhere" – 2:00
9. "Down at Bonebridge" – 5:57

== Personnel ==
- Erik Friedlander – cello
- Doug Wamble – guitar
- Trevor Dunn – bass
- Mike Sarin – drums
