= Broken Arm Trio =

Studio album by Erik Friedlander
- Released: October 22, 2008
- Recorded: January 24 & 25, 2008; Excello Studios
- Genre: Avant-garde, jazz, Americana, contemporary classical music
- Length: 49:08
- Label: Skipstone 003
- Producer: Erik Friedlander

Erik Friedlander chronology
Eiger (2007)	Broken Arm Trio (2008)	50 Miniatures for Improvising Quintet (2010)

Broken Arm Trio is an album by cellist Erik Friedlander, bassist Trevor Dunn, and drummer Mike Sarin performing compositions inspired by Oscar Pettiford's cello work and the music of Herbie Nichols.

== Reception ==
Writing for All About Jazz, Mark Corroto observed "Friedlander seems to be opening his music to jazz and no-jazz fans. Much like Bill Frisell and Charlie Haden's open arm approach to jazz that can swallow both country and classical, Friedlander is pushing his vision into the open ended world defined simply as music". On the same site Troy Collins noted "A tireless artist, always open to expanding the acoustic cello language, Broken Arm Trio is one of Friedlander's most refreshing and vibrant efforts". A.D. Amorosi stated in JazzTimes that "it’s gorgeous, soulful and smart".

== Track listing ==
All compositions by Erik Friedlander

1. "Spinning Plates" – 3:23
2. "Pearls" – 4:36
3. "Knife Points" – 2:36
4. "Jim Zipper" – 1:08
5. "Pretty Penny" – 4:15
6. "Easy" – 6:10
7. "Cake" – 3:38
8. "Buffalo" – 1:29
9. "Hop Skip" – 6:47
10. "Ink" – 2:01
11. "Big Shoes" – 4:13
12. "In the Spirit" – 4:00
13. "Tiny's" – 4:44

== Personnel ==
- Erik Friedlander – cello
- Trevor Dunn – bass
- Mike Sarin – drums
