= Death Ambient =

American experimental and ambient music trio

- Origin: New York City, U.S.
- Genres: Ambient, experimental, free improvisation
- Years active: 1995–2007
- Label: Tzadik
- Members: Fred Frith; Kato Hideki; Ikue Mori
- Past members: James Plotkin

Death Ambient is an American experimental and ambient music trio comprising Kato Hideki (bass guitar), Ikue Mori (drum machines), and Fred Frith (guitar). The group was formed by Kato and Mori in 1995 and recorded three albums: Death Ambient (1995) Synaesthesia (1999), Drunken Forest (2007) with guest Jim Pugliese (percussion).

== Background ==
Kato Hideki, a Japanese bass guitarist and founding member of Ground Zero, moved to New York City in 1992. He began working with Christian Marclay, Marc Ribot, and John Zorn. In 1995, he began collaborating with Ikue Mori, who had been the drummer for DNA. After DNA disbanded, Mori experimented with modified drum machines to play samples of music, before shifting entirely to laptop computer-based music creation. Mori and Kato invited guitarist Fred Frith to the join the group. A founding member of Henry Cow, Frith had lived in New York City for fourteen years and collaborated with many experimental music musicians. According to Mori, the aim of Death Ambient was "to create sounds and texture extravaganza."

Death Ambient recorded their first album, Death Ambient at Green Point Studio in Brooklyn in 1995. The ambient music was a collection of improvised pieces that included Mori's drum machine generated sound samples. The album was released the same year in the New Japan series on John Zorn's Tzadik record label.

In 1997 American guitarist James Plotkin temporarily replaced Frith for a UK tour that included concerts in London and Stirling. The London concert was broadcast on BBC Radio 3's show, Mixing It. Frith rejoined Death Ambient in 1998 and the trio gave a concert in Halle, Germany. It was the first time the original trio had performed together as a group outside the recording studio. In June 1999 they returned to New York City to record their second album, Synaesthesia, using material from the concert in Germany. It was also released on Tzadik Records in 1999.

In May 2007, after six years in the making, Drunken Forest with guest percussionist Jim Pugliese was released, also in Tzadik's New Japan series. The trio (without Pugliese) performed the album live at John Zorn's not-for-profit experimental music performance space, The Stone, on May 4 and 5, 2007.

== Members ==
- Kato Hideki – bass guitar
- Ikue Mori – drum machines, (since 2007) laptop computer
- Fred Frith – guitar

== Discography ==
- Death Ambient (Tzadik, 1995)
- Synaesthesia (Tzadik, 1999)
- Drunken Forest (Tzadik, 2007)

== See also ==
- List of ambient music artists
