= Masada Recital =

Masada Anniversary Edition Vol. 4: Masada Recital

Studio album by John Zorn
- Released: June 29, 2004
- Recorded: February 17, 2004
- Genre: Jazz, klezmer, contemporary classical music
- Length: 49:19
- Label: Tzadik TZ 7190
- Producer: John Zorn

John Zorn chronology
50th Birthday Celebration Volume 4 (2004)	Masada Anniversary Edition Vol. 4: Masada Recital (2004)	50th Birthday Celebration Volume 5 (2004)

Masada Anniversary chronology
The Unknown Masada (2003)	Masada Recital (2004)	Masada Rock (2005)

Masada Anniversary Edition Vol. 4: Masada Recital is the fourth album in a series of five releases celebrating the 10th anniversary of John Zorn's Masada songbook project. It features 12 Masada songs performed by Sylvie Courvoisier on piano and Mark Feldman on violin. It was released in 2004 on Zorn's Tzadik Records as part of the Radical Jewish Culture Series.

== Reception ==
Allmusic music critic Sean Westergaard wrote "Each also brings a wealth of extended techniques to the proceedings, which helps the players to really make the songs their own. In fact, some listeners may be surprised that only piano and violin are being used, given the range of sounds and tones produced... A nice mix of inside and outside playing, Masada Recital is another winning entry in the ever-expanding catalog of Masada performances."

Professional ratings
Review scores
Source	Rating
Allmusic	4/5 stars
The Penguin Guide to Jazz	3.5/4 stars

== Track listing ==
1. "Kanah" – 4:15
2. "Socoh" – 3:46
3. "Mahshav" – 5:39
4. "Karet" – 2:05
5. "Abidan" – 3:06
6. "Malkhut" – 2:17*
7. "Azekah" – 6:05
8. "Nezikin" – 2:13
9. "Karaim" – 8:55
10. "Hath Arob" – 2:12
11. "Aravot" – 3:47
12. "Mahlah" – 4:52

All compositions by John Zorn.
Recorded at Hit Factory, New York City on February 17, 2004

- *misspelled as "Malkut" on album sleeve

== Personnel ==
- Sylvie Courvoisier – piano
- Mark Feldman – violin
