= 50 Miniatures for Improvising Quintet =

Studio album by Erik Friedlander
- Released: 2010
- Recorded: May 5, 2008; Kampo Studios, New York City
- Genre: Avant-garde, contemporary classical music
- Length: 49:08
- Label: Skipstone 006
- Producer: Erik Friedlander

Erik Friedlander chronology
Broken Arm Trio (2008)	50 Miniatures for Improvising Quintet (2010)	Bonebridge (2011)

50 Miniatures for Improvising Quintet is an album by cellist Erik Friedlander, violinist Jennifer Choi, pianist Sylvie Courvoisier, bassist Trevor Dunn, and percussionist Mike Sarin released on the Skipstone label.

== Reception ==
Professional ratings
Review scores
Source	Rating
Free Jazz Collective	4/5 stars

The Free Jazz Collective observed "Despite the incredible short length of the pieces, the overall result is quite coherent, with sometimes sudden unexpected violent intrusion in more sensitive pieces, but the contrast works well. Not only is the playing excellent, but Friedlander is full of musical ideas, sufficiently so to make the short snippets of music - sometimes quite structured, sometimes seemingly improvised - utterly compelling".

Carlo Wolff stated in JazzTimes that "The musicianship is extraordinary, its fullness informing each section no matter how brief or abstract. I consider this contemporary classical music more than jazz: While certain sections skirt chaos and are resolutely dissonant, others are outright placid".

== Track listing ==
All compositions by Erik Friedlander

1. "Stepping/Tangle/Like a Dream/Spider/A Settling Fog/The Fool/Solitary" - 4:59
2. "War Cry/Harbinger/Retaliation/The Fool: Repose/Blink/Express/Soul Bird" - 3:53
3. "Bad Pool/The Moon/Night Flower/Death Rattle/No Answers/Machine/Hunted" - 5:18
4. "Molting/Swift/Flow/Spikes/Dainty/The Fool: Serious Matters/Undulation" - 5:15
5. "Liquid/Headlong/Bone/Run Into Waves/Taking Hold/Show of Force/Fracture" - 4:51
6. "Drought/Balance/On Point/Crossing/Stacks/Soft Steps/Tussle" - 6:27
7. "Meditation/A Story Ends/Hazards/Acorn/Noir/Salon/Blackberry/Persist" - 5:47

== Personnel ==
- Erik Friedlander – cello
- Jennifer Choi – violin
- Sylvie Courvoisier – piano
- Trevor Dunn – bass
- Mike Sarin – percussion
