= Oblivia (album) =

Studio album by Mark Feldman & Sylvie Courvoisier
- Released: January 26, 2010
- Recorded: 2009
- Genre: Contemporary classical music
- Length: 51:28
- Label: Tzadik TZ 7633
- Producers: Mark Feldman & Sylvie Courvoisier

Mark Feldman chronology
To Fly to Steal (2010)	Oblivia (2010)	Hôtel du Nord (2011)

Sylvie Courvoisier chronology
To Fly to Steal (2010)	Oblivia (2010)	Hôtel du Nord (2011)

Oblivia is an album by violinist Mark Feldman and pianist Sylvie Courvoisier which was released on the Tzadik label in 2010.

== Reception ==
Professional ratings
Review scores
Source	Rating
Allmusic	4/5 stars

In his review for Allmusic, James Manheim notes that "the music is generally absorbing, and fans of Zorn and his followers may want to tease out the processes over repeated listenings". On All About Jazz Kurt Gottschalk said "Both players are extraordinarily sensitive in going toward and away from their instruments' orthodox voices. With her background in European avant-garde composition and improvisation, Courvoisier tends to bring more abstraction to the picture, whereas Feldman—with his long history as an interpreter and session player—is more the melodicist. But what's important is how well they intuit meeting grounds across the 11 pieces here".

== Track listing ==
All compositions by Sylvie Courvoisier & Mark Feldman except as indicated

1. "Conky's Lament" – 2:00
2. "Dunes" (Courvoisier) – 6:18
3. "Messiaenesque" (Courvoisier) – 2:22
4. "Purveyors" (Feldman) – 7:25
5. "Oblivia de Oblivion" – 1:46
6. "Double Windsor" (Courvoisier) – 4:57
7. "Basorah" (Courvoisier) – 9:23
8. "Vis-a-Vis" – 3:05
9. "Samarcande" – 2:07
10. "Fontanelle" – 1:45
11. "Sous un Rêve Huileux" (Courvoisier) – 10:20

== Personnel ==
- Mark Feldman – violin
- Sylvie Courvoisier – piano
