= Thomas Morgan (bassist) =

American jazz bassist

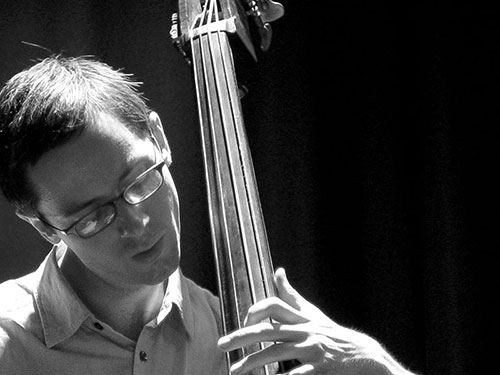
- Morgan performs in Aarhus, Denmark, in 2015.

Background information
- Born: 14 August 1981 (age 45); Hayward, California
- Genre: Jazz
- Occupation: Musician
- Instrument: Double bass
- Years active: 2000–present
- Labels: Verve, ECM, JMT, Milestone, Blue Note, Concord
- Website: thomasmorgan.net

Thomas Morgan (born 14 August 1981) is an American jazz bassist.

== Biography ==
Morgan began playing the cello at 7, eventually switching to upright-bass at 14. In 2003 he received his bachelor's degree in Music from the Manhattan School of Music, where he studied with Harvie Swartz and Garry Diall. He has also studied briefly with Ray Brown and Peter Herbert. Morgan has worked with David Binney, Steve Coleman, Joey Baron, Josh Roseman, Brad Shepik, Steve Cardenas, Timuçin Şahin, Kenny Wollesen, Gerald Cleaver, Adam Rogers and Kenny Werner. He has also collaborated with Jakob Bro, Dan Tepfer, Jim Black, John Abercrombie, and Masabumi Kikuchi, and he has performed with the Sylvie Courvoisier-Mark Feldman Quartet.

Morgan was featured prominently on the 2017 ECM album Small Town in a duet setting with guitarist Bill Frisell. The album documents a 2016 live performance at the Village Vanguard.

In 2014, Morgan's own trio, featuring keyboardist Pete Rende and drummer Dan Weiss, was reviewed in the New York Times by jazz critic Ben Ratliff, who called Morgan, "a jazz musician whose presence in a recording or a performance almost automatically [makes] it worth your time".

== Discography ==
=== As sideman ===
With David Binney

- Bastion of Sanity (Criss Cross, 2005)
- Cities and Desire (Criss Cross, 2006)
- In the Paint (Posi-Tone, 2009)

With Jim Black

- Somatic (Winter & Winter, 2011)
- Actuality (Winter & Winter, 2014)
- The Constant (Intakt, 2016)
- Reckon (Intakt, 2020)

With Samuel Blaser

- 7th Heaven (Between the Lines, 2008)
- Pieces of Old Sky (Clean Feed, 2009)
- Consort in Motion (Kind of Blue, 2011)

With Jakob Bro

- Time (Loveland, 2011)
- BRO/KNAK (Loveland, 2012)
- December Song (Loveland, 2013)
- Gefion (ECM, 2015)
- Hymnotic/Salmodisk (Loveland, 2015)
- Streams (ECM, 2016)
- Returnings (ECM, 2018)
- Bay of Rainbows (ECM, 2018)

With Scott DuBois

- Monsoon (Soul Note, 2004)
- Tempest (Soul Note, 2006)
- Banshees (Sunnyside, 2008)
- Black Hawk Dance (Sunnyside, 2010)
- Landscape Scripture (Sunnyside, 2012)
- Winter Light (ACT, 2015)
- Autumn Wind (ACT, 2017)

With Bill Frisell

- When You Wish Upon a Star (Okeh, 2016)
- Small Town (ECM, 2017)
- Epistrophy (ECM, 2019)
- Valentine (Blue Note, 2020)

With others

- John Abercrombie, Wait Till You See Her (ECM, 2009)
- Steve Cardenas, Melody in a Dream (Sunnyside, 2013)
- Steve Cardenas, Charlie & Paul (Newvelle, 2018)
- Steve Coleman, Harvesting Semblances and Affinities (Pi, 2010)
- Steve Coleman, The Mancy of Sound (Pi, 2011)
- Sylvie Courvoisier & Mark Feldman, To Fly to Steal (Intakt, 2010)
- Sylvie Courvoisier & Mark Feldman, Hôtel du Nord (Intakt, 2011)
- Masabumi Kikuchi, Sunrise (ECM, 2012)
- Masabumi Kikuchi, Masabumi Kikuchi/Ben Street/Thomas Morgan/Kresten Osgood (ILK Music, 2015)
- Casimir Liberski & Tyshawn Sorey, Thomas Morgan, Evanescences (Dalang!, 2010)
- Andre Matos, Quare (Inner Circle Music, 2010)
- Ron Miles, I Am a Man (Yellowbird, 2017)
- Paul Motian, On Broadway Vol. 5 (Winter & Winter, 2009)
- Paul Motian, The Windmills of Your Mind (Winter & Winter, 2011)
- Miles Okazaki, Figurations (Sunnyside, 2012)
- Pete Robbins, Waits & Measures (Playscape, 2006)
- Pete Robbins, Do the Hate Laugh Shimmy (Fresh Sound, 2008)
- August Rosenbaum, Beholder (Hiatus, 2010)
- August Rosenbaum, Heights (Hiatus, 2013)
- Timucin Sahin, Bafa (Between the Lines, 2009)
- Jen Shyu, Sounds and Cries of the World (Pi, 2015)
- Jen Shyu, Song of Silver Geese (Pi, 2017)
- Tyshawn Sorey, That/Not (Firehouse 12, 2007)
- Tyshawn Sorey, Koan (482 Music, 2009)
- Tomasz Stańko, Wisława (ECM, 2013)
- Craig Taborn, Chants (ECM, 2013)
- Dan Tepfer, Eleven Cages (Sunnyside, 2017)
- Henry Threadgill, Dirt... and More Dirt (Pi, 2018)
- David Virelles, Mboko (ECM, 2014)
- David Virelles, Gnosis (ECM, 2017)
- Florian Weber, Biosphere (Enja, 2012)

== See also ==
- List of jazz bassists
