= 50th Birthday Celebration Volume Four =

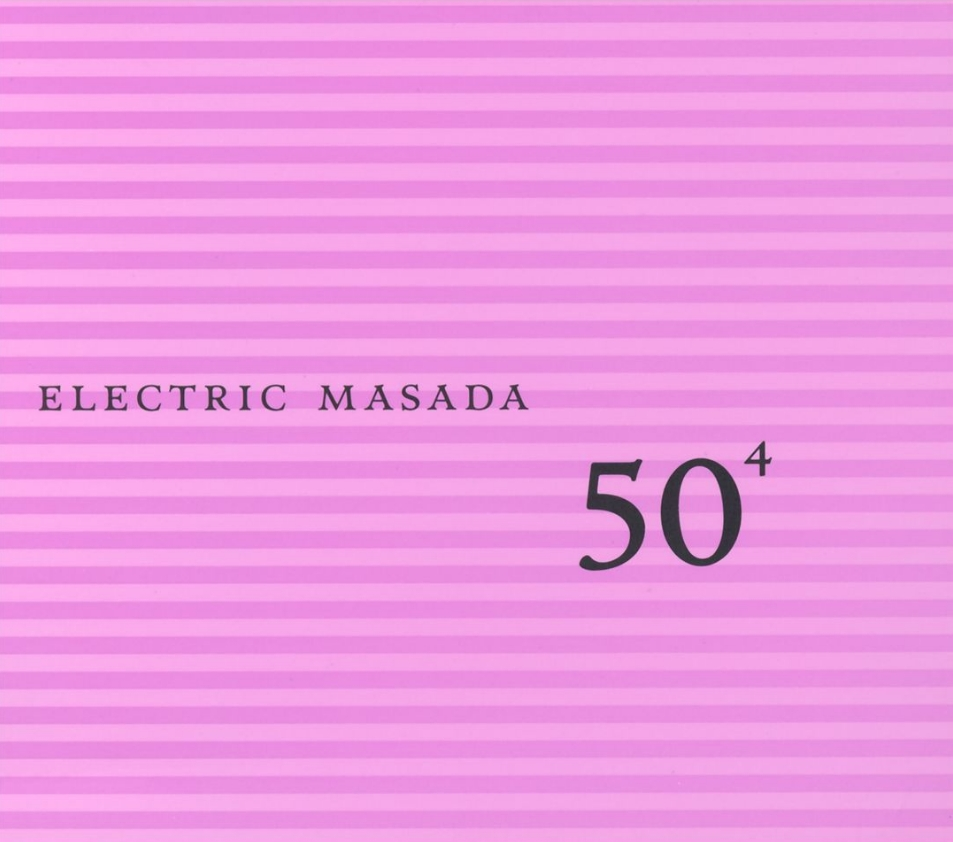

Live album by Electric Masada
- Released: May 25, 2004
- Recorded: September 27, 2003
- Genres: Downtown music, avant-garde jazz
- Length: 72:32
- Label: Tzadik
- Producer: John Zorn

John Zorn chronology
50th Birthday Celebration Volume Three (2004)	50th Birthday Celebration Volume Four (2004)	Masada Recital (2004)

Electric Masada chronology
50th Birthday Celebration Volume Four (2004)	At the Mountains of Madness (2005)

50th Birthday Celebration Volume Four is a live album by Electric Masada documenting their performance at Tonic in September 2003 as part of John Zorn's month-long 50th Birthday Celebration.

== Reception ==
Professional ratings
Review scores
Source	Rating
AllMusic	4.5/5 stars

The AllMusic review by Sean Westergaard states "This is a fantastic ensemble, with lots of time spent playing together, and Zorn knows how get the best out of them. Fans of the Masada series will not be disappointed. Excellent."

== Track listing ==
All tracks are written by John Zorn.

No.	Title	Length
1.	"Tekufah"	14:33
2.	"Idalah-Abal"	6:18
3.	"Hadasha"	13:48
4.	"Hath-Arob"	4:07
5.	"Yatzar"	9:20
6.	"Lilin"	15:41
7.	"Kisofim"	8:41

== Personnel ==
- Cyro Baptista – percussion
- Joey Baron – drums
- Trevor Dunn – bass
- Ikue Mori – laptop electronics
- Marc Ribot – guitar
- Jamie Saft– keyboards
- Kenny Wollesen – drums
- John Zorn – alto saxophone
