= 50th Birthday Celebration Volume Three =

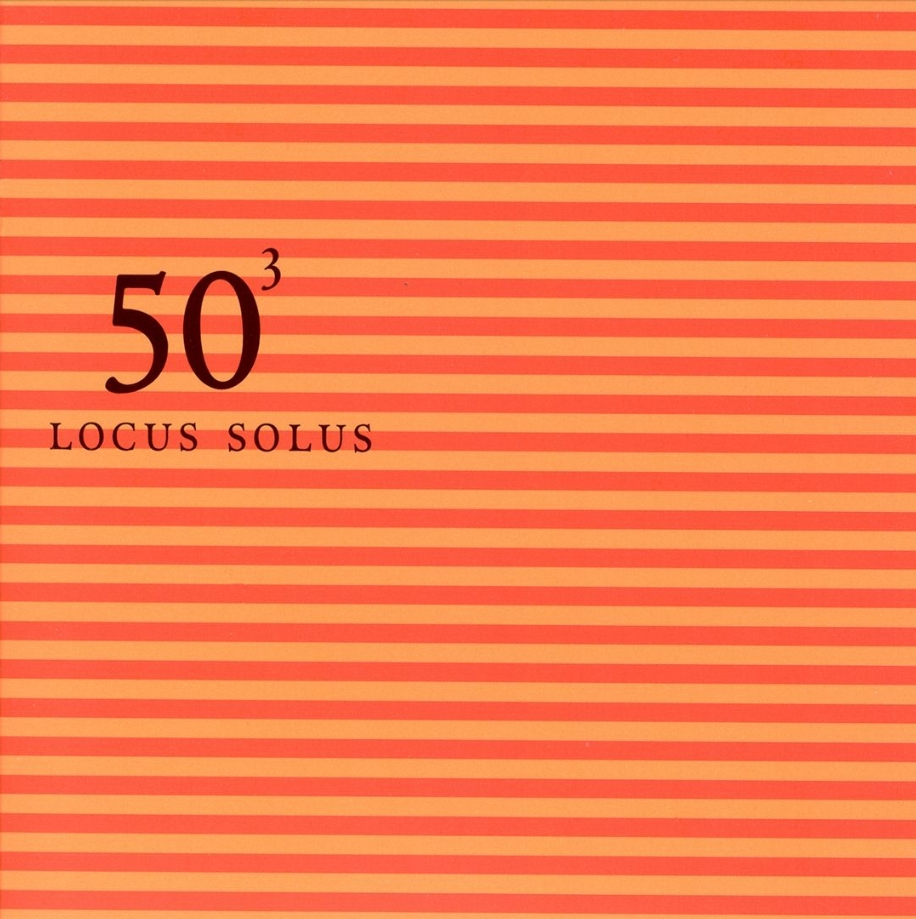

Live album by Locus Solus
- Released: April 27, 2004
- Recorded: September 10, 2003
- Genre: Downtown music, avant-garde jazz
- Length: 44:53
- Label: Tzadik; TZ 5003
- Producer: John Zorn; Kazunori Sugiyama

Locus Solus chronology
50th Birthday Celebration Volume Two (2004)	50th Birthday Celebration Volume Three (2004)	50th Birthday Celebration Volume 4 (2004)

50th Birthday Celebration Volume Three is a live album of improvised music by Locus Solus, a trio consisting of Anton Fier, Arto Lindsay and John Zorn, documenting their performance at Tonic in September 2003 as part of Zorn's month-long 50th Birthday Celebration concert series.

== Critical reception ==
Professional ratings
Review scores
Source	Rating
AllMusic	4/5 stars

The AllMusic review by Sean Westergaard awarded the album 4 stars stating "The level of communication between players is stunning, developing lurching, spastic grooves that then get blown apart like ducks in a shooting gallery... Certainly not for all tastes, this is a noisy, fun listen."

== Track listing ==
All tracks are written by Anton Fier, Arto Lindsay and John Zorn, all lyrics written by Arto Lindsay.

No.	Title	Length
1.	"Intro"	0:34
2.	"That Scene"	1:23
3.	"Doll Moment"	2:53
4.	"Unwritten Law"	2:55
5.	"Ponce"	4:00
6.	"Come Yelling"	1:50
7.	"On the Ropes"	3:28
8.	"Klossowski"	2:21
9.	"Pacing"	2:37
10.	"In Memory Of"	2:38
11.	"Detroit for No Reason"	1:18
12.	"This Year's Skirts"	2:50
13.	"Want Those Boots"	4:19
14.	"Trampoline at Dawn"	1:13
15.	"Last Thing to Get Moist"	4:58
16.	"Ceiling"	4:01
17.	"Doll Sport"	1:25

== Personnel ==
=== Locus Solus ===
- Anton Fier – drums
- Arto Lindsay – guitar, vocals
- John Zorn – alto saxophone

=== Technical personnel ===
- John Zorn – producer
  - Kazunori Sugiyama – co-producer
- Daniel Goldaracena – recording engineer
- Scott Hull – mastering engineer
- Chippy, Heung-Heung Chin – design
