= Live at the Loft =

Live album by Lotte Anker
- Released: 2009
- Recorded: June 22, 2005
- Venue: The Loft, Cologne
- Genre: Jazz
- Length: 55:17
- Label: ILK

Lotte Anker chronology
Alien Huddle (2008)	Live at the Loft (2009)	Floating Islands (2009)

Live at the Loft is the second album by Danish jazz saxophonist Lotte Anker with her trio with pianist Craig Taborn and drummer Gerald Cleaver, which was recorded in 2005 at the Loft in Cologne and released on the Danish ILK label.

== Reception ==
Professional ratings
Review scores
Source	Rating
All About Jazz	3.5/5 stars
AllMusic	3.5/5 stars
The Free Jazz Collective	5/5 stars

In his review for AllMusic, Michael G. Nastos states "While this recording only scratches the surface of their vast collective potential, it does give an indication of how much they enjoy and respect each other's company, and their high level of musicianship."

The Point of Departure review by Stuart Broomer says "It's an extremely deliberate trio, a group in which each member is able to insert marked gestures. It's also a very patient group, willing to develop long, gradual tension curves that arch through a panoply of minor details and events."

The Free Jazz Collective's Stef Gijssels awarded the album a full 5 stars, and wrote: "in the right hands and ears, musical purity in all its polished rawness, in all its real sensitivity, devoid of fake feelings, averse of false pretention, is not a vague dream, but a real possibility. Free form unleashes true feelings. An absolutely stunning performance."

Ken Waxman of Jazz Word stated that the album "pinpoints the cohesive talents of the trio members," and praised "Magic Carpet," noting that it "demonstrates this long-standing aggregation's sonic sensitivity. There's no lead instrument, musical narrative is developed by each player in turn, but full cohesion is the result of interaction."

== Track listing ==
All compositions by Anker/Taborn/Cleaver

1. "Magic Carpet" – 26:38
2. "Real Solid" – 20:20
3. "Berber" – 8:19

== Personnel ==
- Lotte Anker – alto sax, tenor sax
- Craig Taborn – piano
- Gerald Cleaver - drums
