= Small Town (album) =

Live album by Bill Frisell and Thomas Morgan
- Released: May 26, 2017
- Recorded: March 2016
- Venue: Village Vanguard; New York City
- Genre: Jazz
- Length: 68:02
- Label: ECM; ECM 2525
- Producer: Manfred Eicher

Bill Frisell chronology
When You Wish Upon a Star (2016)	Small Town (2017)	Music IS (2018)

Small Town is a live album by Bill Frisell and Thomas Morgan recorded at the Village Vanguard in March 2016 and released on ECM May the following year—Frisell's first album as leader for the label since 1987's Lookout for Hope. More music from the same recording session was released in 2019 as the follow-up album, Epistrophy.

Professional ratings
Aggregate scores
Source	Rating
Metacritic	79/100
Review scores
Source	Rating
AllMusic	3.5/5 stars
All About Jazz	4.5/5 stars
Blurt	4/5 stars
The Guardian	4/5 stars
The Irish Times	4/5 stars
Jazz Forum	5/5 stars
The Times	4/5 stars
Tom Hull	B+

== Reception ==
The AllMusic review by Thom Jurek states, "Morgan is a deeply intuitive player with a glorious earthy, woody tone. He anchors Frisell's more speculative tendencies, allowing the unexpected (and perhaps previously undiscovered) room to emerge and hold its ground between them with the seams showing. Small Town is an excellent showcase for this duo; here's hoping it's only a first volley."

On All About Jazz, John Kelman noted, "Frisell proves that it's possible to bring together original music, country music, jazz standards and more in an unfettered duet setting ... with Small Town, Frisell has clearly found another ideal musical foil to add to his growing cadre of musicians with whom he collaborates on a regular basis. Intimate, beautiful and deep, while at the same time knotty, witty and curiously skewed, Small Town delivers, in many ways, on the promise of In Line's five duo tracks 35 years on, with a live set that proves great music isn't just where you find it; it's everywhere."

In The Guardian, John Fordham called it an "almost psychically empathic duo set" and observed, "Morgan’s quick anticipations of Frisell’s moves give their conversations a startling buoyancy."

In Stereophile, Robert Baird wrote, "Perhaps a bit too samey in approach for newcomers to his music, this is Frisell adding yet again to his ever growing, ever impressive legacy."

== Track listing ==
1. "It Should Have Happened a Long Time Ago" (Paul Motian) – 11:05
2. "Subconscious Lee" (Lee Konitz) – 7:31
3. "Song for Andrew No. 1" (Bill Frisell) – 9:35
4. "Wildwood Flower" (Joseph Philbrick Webster, Maud Irving) – 5:08
5. "Small Town" (Bill Frisell) – 8:57
6. "What a Party" (Dave Bartholomew, Fats Domino, Pearl King) – 6:41
7. "Poet - Pearl" (Bill Frisell, Thomas Morgan) – 12:04
8. "Goldfinger" (John Barry, Leslie Bricusse, Anthony Newley) – 7:01

== Personnel ==
- Bill Frisell – guitar
- Thomas Morgan – bass
