= Triptych (Lotte Anker album) =

Studio album by Lotte Anker
- Released: 2005
- Recorded: May 6, 2003
- Studio: Danish Radio and Soundtrack, Copenhagen
- Genre: Jazz
- Length: 55:27
- Label: Leo
- Producer: Lotte Anker, Leo Feigin

Lotte Anker chronology
Poetic Justice (2001)	Triptych (2005)	Alien Huddle (2008)

Triptych is the debut album by a free improvisation trio consisting of Danish saxophonist Lotte Anker and two American musicians: pianist Craig Taborn and drummer Gerald Cleaver. The trio had its inception in 2003, when a European tour came up and Marilyn Crispell, Anker and Cleaver's regular partner, was unable to participate. The album was released on the English Leo label.

== Reception ==
Professional ratings
Review scores
Source	Rating
All About Jazz	4.5/5 stars
The Penguin Guide to Jazz	3/4 stars
Tom Hull – on the Web	B+

The authors of The Penguin Guide to Jazz described the album as "very impressive, with Anker playing long, looping lines that seem to weave in and out of Taborn's typically subtle and inflected piano. The real discovery of the set, though, is Cleaver, who plays melodically and with a faultless sense of space."

Elliott Simon of All About Jazz awarded the album 4½ stars, and wrote: "For most of these cuts, the fun is getting there and finding your way home, and with these three top improvisers at the controls, Tryptych delivers a magnificent trip."

One Final Note's Ken Waxman stated: "Almost from the first, it seems that the pianist and drummer are intent on expressing with rhythms and chords what the saxophonist does with vibrations and blowing... Triptych... should make Anker's talents more obvious to North Americans; introduce uninformed jazz fans to other Danish—and one French—improvisers; and solidify the reputation of a couple of self-possessed, maturing American sound makers."

== Track listing ==
All compositions by Anker/Taborn/Cleaver

1. "Triptych" – 13:35
2. "Lotuseating" – 2:09
3. "Cumulus" – 12:00
4. "Mr. Yin and Mr. Yan" – 3:51
5. "The Hierophant" – 9:41
6. "1. Act" – 6:44
7. "Frog Floating" – 7:27

== Personnel ==
- Lotte Anker – tenor sax, soprano sax
- Craig Taborn – piano
- Gerald Cleaver - drums
