= Either Or And =

Studio album by Evan Parker and Sylvie Courvoisier
- Released: 2014
- Recorded: 24 September 2013
- Studio: Park West Studios, Brooklyn
- Genre: Jazz
- Length: 58:54
- Label: Relative Pitch Records
- Producer: Mike Panico, Kevin Reilly

Evan Parker chronology
What/If/They Both Could Fly (2013)	Either Or And (2014)	Seven (2014)

Sylvie Courvoisier chronology
Live at Théâtre Vidy-Lausanne (2013)	Either Or And (2014)	Birdies for Lulu (2014)

Either Or And is an album by British jazz saxophonist Evan Parker and Swiss pianist Sylvie Courvoisier, which was recorded in studio after their 2013 performance at The Stone and released on Relative Pitch Records.

== Reception ==
Professional ratings
Review scores
Source	Rating
Down Beat	4/5 stars

The Down Beat review by Alain Drouot states "Even though the duo can get confrontational, they also know how to turn their dueling into fun and communicate the pleasure they take in playing with each other."

== Track listing ==
All compositions by Parker/Courvoisier

1. "If/Or" – 7:02
2. "Oare" – 9:09
3. "Spandrei" – 8:05
4. "Stillwell" – 8:31
5. "Stonewall" – 10:15
6. "Penumbra" – 4:26
7. "Heights" – 4:59
8. "Either Or And" – 6:27

== Personnel ==
- Evan Parker – soprano sax, tenor sax
- Sylvie Courvoisier – piano
