= Black Narcissus (Mephista album) =

Studio album by Mephista
- Released: March 2002
- Recorded: 2002
- Studios: Avatar (New York, New York)
- Genres: Avant-garde, contemporary classical music, jazz
- Length: 58:32
- Labels: Tzadik; TZ 7704
- Producer: Mephista

Mephista chronology
Black Narcissus (2002)	Entomological Reflections (2004)

Sylvie Courvoisier chronology
Deux Pianos (2000)	Black Narcissus (2002)	Abaton (2003)

Black Narcissus is an album by the group Mephista, which comprises pianist Sylvie Courvoisier, electronic artist Ikue Mori and percussionist Susie Ibarra, which was released on the Tzadik label in 2002.

== Reception ==
Professional ratings
Review scores
Source	Rating
AllMusic	4/5 stars

In a review for AllMusic, Jesse Jarnow states "listening to Black Narcissus can be a confusing and trying experience. Each sound suggests something new, and all three musicians are wont to follow that impulse as quickly as possible. It is liberating and beautiful, but also so hyper that it is impossible to listen to with anything but rapt attention. Unless one commits fully to the disc, it will probably sound like an experimental annoyance. If one is willing to surrender, though, there is a rich world waiting".

== Track listing ==
All compositions by Mephista

1. "The Children's Hour" - 3:25
2. "Black Narcissus" - 6:45
3. "Willow's Weep" - 8:11
4. "Cabbalussa" - 7:05
5. "Poison Ivy" - 3:25
6. "Black Widow" - 14:47
7. "Legend of Pele" - 6:03
8. "Leda and the Swan" - 5:38
9. "Laughing Medusa" - 3:13

== Personnel ==
- Sylvie Courvoisier – piano
- Ikue Mori – laptop
- Susie Ibarra – drums
