= Birthmark (Lotte Anker album) =

Studio album by Lotte Anker
- Released: 2013
- Recorded: September 16, 2012
- Studios: Namouche Studio, Lisbon
- Genre: Jazz
- Length: 63:21
- Label: Clean Feed
- Producers: Rodrigo Pinheiro, Hernani Faustino, Lotte Anker

Lotte Anker chronology
Floating Islands (2009)	Birthmark (2013)	Squid Police (2014)

Birthmark is an album by Danish jazz saxophonist Lotte Anker with two Portuguese members of the RED Trio, pianist Rodrigo Pinheiro and double bassist Hernani Faustino. Anker played at Lisbon in 2012 with Fred Frith and Ikue Mori, and Pinheiro invited her to play on this record session. The album was released on the Portuguese Clean Feed label.

== Reception ==
Professional ratings
Review scores
Source	Rating
All About Jazz	3.5/5 stars
The Free Jazz Collective	5/5 stars

In a review for All About Jazz, Mark Corroto states "Anker's command of her instruments (soprano, alto, and tenor saxophones) is exceptional. She has the full complement of sounds from overblowing to growls and at times, ineffable beauty."

The Free Jazz Collective's Stef Gijssels awarded the album a full 5 stars, and wrote: "when Danish saxophonist Lotte Anker teams up with Portuguese pianist Rodrigo Pinheiro and bassist Hernani Faustino from RED Trio, you can bet that magic is the air. And yes, they deliver the goods... Intensity, lyricism, sensitivity and character guaranteed."

== Track listing ==
All compositions by Anker/Pinheiro/Faustino

1. "Rise" – 8:45
2. "Upper Bound" – 4:39
3. "Daytime Song" – 7:54
4. "Golden Spiral" – 13:59
5. "Theorem" – 7:16
6. "Dual" – 10:21
7. "Voices" – 10:27

== Personnel ==
- Lotte Anker – soprano sax, alto sax, tenor sax,
- Rodrigo Pinheiro – piano
- Hernani Faustino - double bass
