= IAO (album) =

IAO (Music in Sacred Light)

Studio album by John Zorn
- Released: May 21, 2002
- Length: 51:25
- Label: Tzadik TZ 7338
- Producer: John Zorn

John Zorn chronology
Naked City Live, Vol. 1: The Knitting Factory 1989 (2002)	IAO (Music in Sacred Light) (2002)	Hemophiliac (2002)

IAO (subtitled Music in Sacred Light) is the tenth studio album by John Zorn released in 2002 on the Tzadik label. It was inspired by Aleister Crowley and his follower, filmmaker Kenneth Anger. Its title is drawn from the Kabbalistic identity of IAO, the initials of Isis, Apophis and Osiris, used as a magical formula in the Hermetic Order of the Golden Dawn and in Aleister Crowley's Gnostic Mass.

== Reception ==
Professional ratings
Review scores
Source	Rating
AllMusic	4/5 stars
Pitchfork	8.3/10

Allmusic's François Couture observed "This album, a studio suite, is wrapped in mysticism... I.A.O. makes a calm, enjoyable listen and beyond its mystical claims, it includes some strong compositions".

Writing for Pitchfork Media, Dominique Leone stated "The music of IAO is classic Zorn: dark ambient exoticism, ethnic percussion exercises, hypnotic suspense-film music, thrash, and avant-garde classical. Similar to his recent "Music for Children" series, he seems to be loosening the reins on his tradition for branding each project an isolated incident, opting instead to use all of his best colors on one canvas... Whatever the inspiration for IAO, the results are often so engaging (and, yes, sometimes scary) that it's hard to question Zorn's motives".

On All About Jazz, Farrell Lowe wrote that "John Zorn incorporates a wide array of influences and musical styles in IAO. To his credit, he never loses sight of his reason for creating the music in the first place. Like an alchemist, he seems to be interested in the manifestation and transformation of human physicality into numinous spirit... IAO is powerful music outside the realm of head/solo/head mentality, but equally valid—and a welcome addition to the canon of creative music".

== Track listing ==
All compositions by John Zorn

1. "Invocation" - 7:19
2. "Sex Magick" - 13:26
3. "Sacred Rites of the Left Hand Path" - 6:31
4. "The Clavicle of Solomon" - 9:28
5. "Lucifer Rising" - 5:23
6. "Leviathan" - 3:26
7. "Mysteries" - 5:50

== Personnel ==
- John Zorn - alto sax, electronics, piano, wurlitzer
- Rebecca Moore - vocals
- Jamie Saft - keyboards
- Greg Cohen - bass
- Bill Laswell - electric bass
- Jim Pugliese - drums
- Cyro Baptista - percussion
- Jennifer Charles - vocals
- Beth Anne Hatton - vocals
- Mike Patton - vocals
