= When You Wish Upon a Star (album) =

Studio album by Bill Frisell
- Released: January 29, 2016
- Recorded: 2015
- Studio: Flora Recording & Playback, Portland, OR
- Genre: Jazz
- Length: 64:25
- Label: OKeh
- Producer: Lee Townsend

Bill Frisell chronology
| Guitar in the Space Age! (2014) | When You Wish Upon a Star (2016) | Small Town (2017) |

When You Wish Upon a Star is an album of motion picture themes by Bill Frisell which was released on the OKeh label in 2016.

== Reception ==
Professional ratings
Review scores
| Source | Rating |
|---|---|
| PopMatters | 6/10 stars |
| All About Jazz | 4.5/5 stars |
| The Independent | 4/5 stars |
| Tom Hull | B |

In his review for PopMatters, John Paul wrote, "Frisell explores the world of television and film themes on his latest, When You Wish Upon a Star. With each, Frisell takes the most recognizable elements of each, building around this central theme and then subjecting each to a funhouse mirror approach that extends and distorts melodies and motifs to create an often gloriously mutated, albeit gentle, impression of the familiar". On All About Jazz, John Kelman said "With When You Wish Upon a Star, Frisell can add a collection of film and television music to his body of work; an album that, in its own inherent diversity and performed by a stellar group that features, for the first time, a vocalist in his lineup, ranks not only as one of the guitarist's best albums in recent years, but one of his best recordings ever". Andy Gill of The Independent wrote, "Frisell is meticulous throughout, never playing more than necessary, and slanting the arrangements to bring out the themes' essential characters."

== Track listing ==
1. "To Kill a Mockingbird Part 1" (Elmer Bernstein) – 3:10
2. "To Kill a Mockingbird Part 2" (Bernstein) – 4:52
3. "You Only Live Twice" (John Barry, Leslie Bricusse) – 5:10
4. "Psycho Part 1" (Bernard Herrmann) – 1:58
5. "Psycho Part 2" (Herrmann) – 2:07
6. "The Shadow of Your Smile" (Johnny Mandel, Paul Francis Webster) – 5:10
7. "Bonanza" (Ray Evans, Jay Livingston) – 1:35
8. "Once Upon a Time in the West (Theme)" (Ennio Morricone) – 4:09
9. "As a Judgement" (Morricone) – 4:30
10. "Farewell to Cheyenne" (Morricone) – 4:35
11. "When You Wish Upon a Star" (Leigh Harline, Ned Washington) – 3:08
12. "Tales From the Far Side" (Bill Frisell) – 4:59
13. "Moon River" (Henry Mancini, Johnny Mercer) – 3:46
14. "The Godfather" (Nino Rota) – 9:32
15. "The Bad and the Beautiful" (David Raksin) – 2:56
16. "Happy Trails" (Dale Evans) – 1:49

== Personnel ==
- Bill Frisell – electric guitar, acoustic guitar
- Petra Haden – vocals
- Eyvind Kang – viola
- Thomas Morgan – bass
- Rudy Royston – drums, percussion
