= Floating Islands (album) =

Live album by Lotte Anker
- Released: 2009
- Recorded: July 2008
- Venue: Borups Concert Hall, Copenhagen
- Genre: Jazz
- Length: 54:24
- Label: ILK

Lotte Anker chronology
Live at the Loft (2009)	Floating Islands (2009)	Birthmark (2013)

Floating Islands is the third album by Danish jazz saxophonist Lotte Anker with her trio with pianist Craig Taborn and drummer Gerald Cleaver, which was recorded live at the 2008 Copenhagen Jazz Festival and released on the Danish ILK label.

== Reception ==
Professional ratings
Review scores
Source	Rating
AllMusic	3.5/5 stars
The Free Jazz Collective	5/5 stars

In his review for AllMusic, Michael G. Nastos states "This trio has grasped something uniquely subtle and admirably less than the sum of its parts. Not at all a critique, but in a way, admirable that three musicians can reduce their music to smaller pieces in order to expand their horizons."

The Free Jazz Collective's Stef Gijssels awarded the album a full 5 stars, and wrote: "This album has it all: the mastership, the skills, the balance, the musical baggage to draw from, the musical vision, the coherent delivery, the variation, the adventure, the passion, the discipline, the raw emotional power, the sophistication... Absolutely stunning."

Ken Waxman of Jazz Word stated that the album "demonstrates the cohesive skills of the Anker/Taborn/Cleaver group" as well as "the trio's extrasensory perception."

Writing for A Jazz Noise, Dave Foxall commented: "The list of albums out there that could be 'classics' if only they had a wider exposure is probably as long as both of my arms. But. If I were to draw up that long, long list, Floating Islands might very well find itself near the top."

== Track listing ==
All compositions by Anker/Taborn/Cleaver

1. "Floating" – 9:34
2. "Ritual" – 16:22
3. "Transitory Blossom" – 4:50
4. "Backwards River" – 17:52
5. "Even Today I'm Still Arriving" – 5:46

== Personnel ==
- Lotte Anker – soprano sax, alto sax, tenor sax,
- Craig Taborn – piano
- Gerald Cleaver - drums
