= Hemophiliac (band) =

American band

Hemophiliac is an experimental musical act. This group is billed as "improvisational music from the outer reaches of madness". Mike Patton does voice effects along with John Zorn on saxophone and Ikue Mori on laptop electronics.

== Discography ==
- 2002 – Hemophiliac (limited two-disc set)
- 2004 – 50th Birthday Celebration Volume 6
