= Femina (album) =

Studio album by John Zorn
- Released: October 27, 2009
- Recorded: December 16–18, 2008
- Genre: Avant-garde, contemporary classical, avant-garde jazz, noise
- Length: 35:24
- Label: Tzadik TZ 7377
- Producer: John Zorn

John Zorn chronology
| O'o (2009) | Femina (2009) | Mycale: Book of Angels Volume 13 (2010) |

Femina is the eleventh album by American composer John Zorn recorded in New York City in December 2008 and released on the Tzadik label in October 2009. The album is a tribute to the artistic creativity of women.

== Reception ==
Professional ratings
Review scores
| Source | Rating |
|---|---|
| Allmusic | 5/5 stars |

Allmusic said "The music is among Zorn's most immediately engaging. It still consists of the juxtaposition of brief, sometimes jarringly disjunct musical ideas that has been a characteristic of much of his work, but while there are still some grindingly dissonant sections, the tone is predominantly lyrical... Femina is an album that reveals yet another facet of the composer's multifarious creative personality and is one that could attract new listeners to his work. Highly recommended". All About Jazz stated "The lyrical 35-minute piece lurches briskly from one mood to the next, vacillating from wispy introspective glissandos and airy impressionistic swells to concise thickets of caterwauling frenzy... In terms of aesthetics, Femina hearkens back to Zorn's early jump-cut style of writing and composing, bolstered by his current fascination with conventionally tuneful melodies and harmonies".

== Track listing ==
All compositions by John Zorn

1. "Femina Part 1" - 11:42
2. "Femina Part 2" - 10:11
3. "Femina Part 3" - 10:15
4. "Femina Part 4" - 3:16

== Personnel ==
- Jennifer Choi – violin
- Sylvie Courvoisier – piano
- Carol Emanuel – harp
- Okkyung Lee – cello
- Ikue Mori – electronics
- Shayna Dunkelman – percussion
- Laurie Anderson – narration

== Production ==
- Marc Urselli – engineer, audio mixer
- John Zorn and Kazunori Sugiyama – producers
