= Beyond the Mist (Lotte Anker album) =

Studio album by Lotte Anker, Mette Petersen
- Released: 1989
- Recorded: February 26 & 27, 1989
- Studio: Sun Studio, Copenhagen
- Genre: Jazz
- Length: 45:03
- Label: Stunt
- Producer: Bjarne Hansen

Lotte Anker chronology
Beyond the Mist (1989)	Being (1993)

Beyond the Mist is the debut album by a quartet co-led by two Danish jazz musicians: saxophonist Lotte Anker and pianist Mette Petersen, which was recorded in 1989 and released on the Danish Stunt label.

== Reception ==
Professional ratings
Review scores
Source	Rating
The Penguin Guide to Jazz	3/4 stars

The Penguin Guide to Jazz notes that the album "is well worth searching out, not least for the interplay between two of the most interesting female performers in European free jazz. The improvisations here are well centred and almost earthy in impact, contrary to any false impression ´mist' may have given."

In a review for Wondering Sound, Charles Farrell says "Beyond the Mist is genuinely interactive quartet music: The players are all integral to its success, contributing to the common language. Each also manages to establish a strong individual voice along the way."

== Track listing ==
1. "Beyond the Mist" (Lotte Anker/Mette Petersen) – 2:56
2. "Guardian" (Mette Petersen) – 6:36
3. "Månegal" (Mette Petersen) – 8:06
4. "Februar" (Lotte Anker) – 4:58
5. "Syeeda's Song Flute" (John Coltrane)– 8:44
6. "Flossing" (Lotte Anker) – 8:24
7. "Pieces of My Master's Pieces" (Mette Petersen) – 5:19

== Personnel ==
- Lotte Anker – soprano sax
- Mette Petersen – piano
- Jesper Lundgaard – bass
- Jens Jefsen – bass on 7
- Jesper Elén – drums
