= Timuçin Şahin =

Turkish jazz guitarist and composer (born 1973)

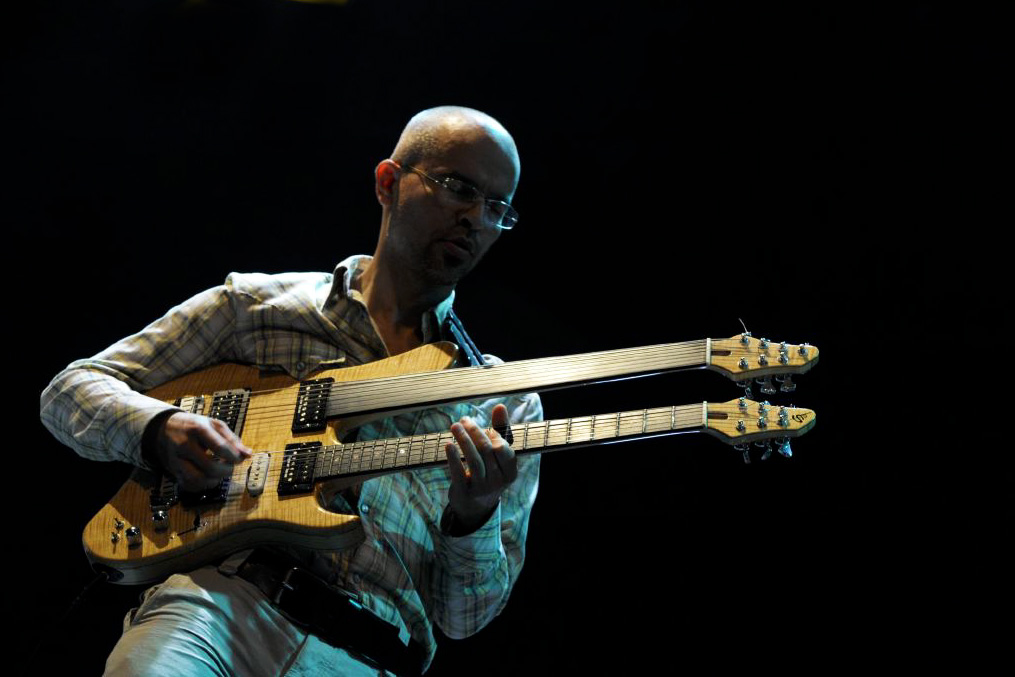
Timuçin Şahin at the Moers festival in 2009

Timuçin Şahin (born 3 February 1973) is a Turkish jazz guitarist and composer. He was awarded first prize at the Dutch Jazz Competition in 2001 and second prizes at the Jur Naessens Music Award in 2002, and the Deloitte Jazz Award in 2006. He has so far released five contemporary jazz albums, including solo releases, as part of the contemporary jazz trio On the Line, and as part of the Timucin Sahin Quartet and the Timucin Sahin Quintet.

== Career ==
Şahin started playing guitar when he was 16 years old. In 1992 he began studying jazz guitar with Joe Pass and John Abercombie at Hilversum Conservatory in Rotterdam, Holland. He went on to study classical composition with Daan Manneke at the Amsterdam Conservatory, and with and George Crumb at the Manhattan School of Music in New York.

He has played and recorded with Randy Brecker, Greg Osby, Robin Eubanks, Kai Eckhardt, Mike Mainieri, Mark Turner, Tony Moreno, Ernst Reizeger, Armando Gola, Donny McCaslin, Tyshawn Sorey, Thomas Morgan, Sean Rickman, Marcel Wierckx and Owen Hart Jr.

He has developed his own double necked guitar, on which he combines Indian scales and African rhythms with Western jazz improvisation. Currently, Şahin is a PhD candidate in composition at New York University.

His latest band quartet Timuçin Şahin's Flow State is based in New York City and comprehends jazz bassist Christopher Tordini, pianist Cory Smythe, drummer Tom Rainey (who replaced Sean Rickman).

== Awards and recognition ==
- 2001: first prize, Dutch Jazz Competition, On the Line
- 2002: second prize for his composition Occult at the Jur Naessens Music Award
- 2006: second prize in the Deloitte Jazz Award, performing with the Concertgebouw Jazz Orchestra, Amsterdam

== Discography ==
- On the Line: The Unexpected, 2001
- Slick Road (with Robin Eubanks, Hein van de Geyn, Afra Mussawisade and B.C. Manjunath), 2003
- Window for my breath (with Kai Eckhardt and Owen Hart Jr.), 2005
- Amsterdam, de Wereld (KLR014): Elif'e Mektuplar [5'] soprano, bass clarinet, violoncello
- Timuçin Şahin Quartet: Bafa (with John O'Gallagher, Tyshawn Sorey, and Thomas Morgan), 2009
- Timucin Sahin Quintet: Inherence (with John O'Gallagher, Tyshawn Sorey, Christopher Tordini, and Ralph Alessi), 2013
- Timuçin Şahin's Flow State: Nothing Bad Can Happen (Challenge, 2017)
- Timuçin Şahin's Flow State: Funk Poems For 'Bird' - A Homage To Charlie Parker (Kaian, Panoramic Recordings 2022)
