= Godspelized =

Studio album by David S. Ware
- Released: 1996
- Recorded: May 2 & 3, 1996
- Studio: Sound on Sound, New York
- Genre: Jazz
- Length: 66:43
- Label: DIW
- Producer: Kazunori Sugiyama

David S. Ware chronology
DAO (1996)	Godspelized (1996)	Wisdom of Uncertainty (1997)

Godspelized is an album by the American jazz saxophonist David S. Ware, recorded in 1996 and released on the Japanese DIW label. It was the first recording by the David S. Ware Quartet with drummer Susie Ibarra replacing Whit Dickey. The album includes a version of Sun Ra composition "The Stargazers".

== Reception ==
Professional ratings
Review scores
Source	Rating
AllMusic	4.5/5 stars
The Penguin Guide to Jazz	👑

In his review for AllMusic, Thom Jurek states: "This is purely spiritual music, inspiring, moving, and deeply affecting." The Penguin Guide to Jazz awarded the album one of its rare crown accolades, writing that "only Charles Gayle, another William Parker associate, has managed to push the Coltrane idiom further out."

The Wire placed the album in their "50 Records of the Year 1996" list.

== Track listing ==
All compositions by David S. Ware except as indicated

1. "Godspelized" – 15:44
2. "Wisdomsphere" – 7:55
3. "Inner Temple" – 6:40
4. "Wisdom Through Time" – 7:54
5. "The Stargazers" (Sun Ra) – 12:26
6. "Eternal Faces of Brahm" – 11:44
7. "Godspelized" – 4:20

== Personnel ==
- David S. Ware – tenor sax
- Matthew Shipp – piano
- William Parker – bass
- Susie Ibarra – drums
