= Ikue Mori =

Japanese drummer, electronic musician and composer (born 1953)

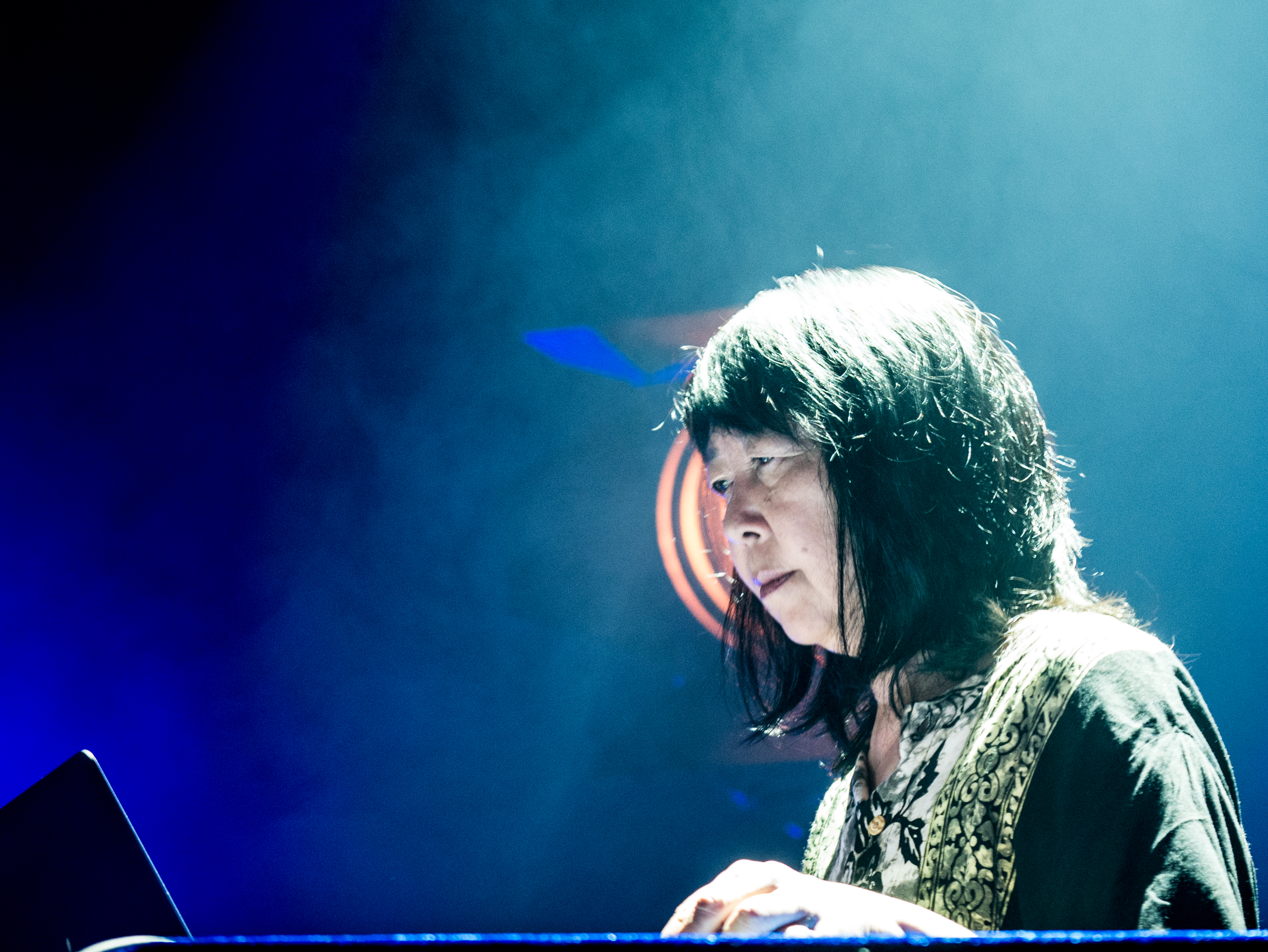
- Mori in 2017

Background information
- Born: 17 December 1953 (age 72); Tokyo, Japan
- Genres: Experimental; no wave; downtown; free improvisation
- Occupations: Musician; composer; graphic designer
- Instruments: Drums; drum machine; sampler
- Years active: 1977–present
- Label: Tzadik

Ikue Mori (森 郁恵, Mori Ikue) (born 17 December 1953), also known as Ikue Ile, is a drummer, electronic musician, composer, and graphic designer. Mori was awarded a "Genius grant" from the MacArthur Foundation in 2022.

== Early life and background ==
Ikue Mori was born on December 17, 1953, in Tokyo, Japan. Growing up in the capital during the postwar period, she was raised in an environment where music was part of daily life, with her grandmother’s traditional Japanese singing offering her earliest musical influence.

During her teenage years in the 1960s, Mori was exposed to American cultural influences, including rock music by performers such as Jimi Hendrix and The Doors, along with films and television that broadened her interests. She studied at local schools in Tokyo, where she learned basic piano as part of the curriculum, although this experience did not initially lead to a strong passion for music. She says she had little interest in music before hearing punk rock. In 1977, she went to New York City, initially for a visit, but she became involved in the music scene, and has remained in New York since.

Inspired by the energy of live performance spaces, Mori began learning the drums soon after her arrival, building her abilities through observation rather than formal instruction. By watching acts such as the Velvet Underground and local experimental musicians, she developed her approach instinctively, blending echoes of Japanese taiko rhythms with a focus on expressive intensity rather than technical precision. During this early phase, she also established connections within the experimental music scene, forming relationships with artists like Lunch, Chance, and Arto Lindsay through shared venues and social circles, which later paved the way for collaborations.

Her first musical experience was as the drummer for seminal no wave band DNA, which also featured East Village musician Arto Lindsay. Though she had little prior musical experience (and had never played drums), Mori quickly developed a distinctive style: One critic describes her as "a tight, tireless master of shifting asymmetrical rhythm", while Lester Bangs wrote that she "cuts Sunny Murray in my book."

After DNA disbanded, Mori became active in the New York experimental music scene. She abandoned her drum set, and began playing drum machines, which she sometimes modified to play various samples. According to Mori, she was trying to make the drum machines "sound broken." Mori gradually transitioned to working with drum machines, laptops, and live electronics, developing a distinctive style blending noise, rhythm, and melody. Mori has described her creative process as similar to cooking, where she combines and transforms different sonic ingredients in real time to create something new and unexpected. Critic Adam Strohm writes that she "founded a new world for the instrument, taking it far beyond backing rhythms and robotic fills." In recent years she has used a laptop as her primary instrument, but is still sometimes credited with "electronic percussion".

In 1995, she began collaborating with Japanese bass guitarist Kato Hideki (from Ground Zero), and together with experimental guitarist Fred Frith (from Henry Cow), they formed Death Ambient. The trio released three albums, Death Ambient (1995), Synaesthesia (1999) and Drunken Forest (2007).

Beyond her solo recordings, she has recorded or performed with Dave Douglas, Butch Morris, Kim Gordon, Thurston Moore, and many others, including as Hemophiliac, a trio with John Zorn and singer Mike Patton, as well as being a member of Zorn's Electric Masada. With Zeena Parkins, she records and tours as duo project Phantom Orchard. She has collaborated extensively with composer John Zorn and has recorded many albums for his label, Tzadik Records. She has also designed the covers for many of their releases.

Mori has drawn inspiration from visual arts. Her 2000 release, One Hundred Aspects of the Moon was inspired by famed Japanese artist Yoshitoshi. Her 2005 recording, Myrninerest, is inspired by outsider artist Madge Gill.

In 2025, Mori was announced as a performer at the Big Ears Festival in Knoxville, as part of her collaboration with harpist Zeena Parkins in the project Phantom Orchard.

== Awards ==
Mori received a 2005-2006 Foundation for Contemporary Arts Grants to Artists Award. In 2022 Mori received the MacArthur Fellowship award ("Genius Grant").

== Discography ==
- Painted Desert (with Robert Quine and Marc Ribot; 1995)
- Hex Kitchen (1995)
- Garden (1996)
- David Watson / Jim Denley / Rik Rue / Amanda Stewart / Ikue Mori - Bit-Part Actor (Braille Records, 1996)
- B/Side (1998)
- One Hundred Aspects of the Moon (2000)
- Labyrinth (2001)
- Phantom Orchard (2004)
- Myrninerest (2005)
- Bhima Swarga (2007)
- Class Insecta (2009)
- Near Nadir (with Mark Nauseef, Evan Parker and Bill Laswell; 2011)
- The Nows (Paul Lytton/Nate Wooley + Ikue Mori/Ken Vandermark; Clean Feed, 2012)
- Scrumptious Sabotage (with Maja S. K. Ratkje; Catalytic Sound, 2013)
- Highsmith (with Craig Taborn; Tzadik, 2017)
- House of Vines (Catalytic Sound, 2020)
- I.P.Y. (with Phew and YoshimiO; Tzadik Records, 2020)
- Tracing the Magic (Tzadik, 2022)
- Quiet Passion (with Yuko Fujiyama and Graham Haynes; Intakt Records, 2022)
- Sand Storm (with Kaze quartet; Atypeek Diffusion/Circum-Disc, 2021)
- Crustal Movement (with Kaze quartet; Circum/Libra, 2023)
- Hit Parade of Tears (as Phantom Orchard with Zeena Parkins; Tzadik Records, 2024)

With Lotte Anker & Sylvie Courvoisier

- Alien Huddle (Intakt, 2008)

With Mephista (Mori, Sylvie Courvoisier and Susie Ibarra)

- Black Narcissus (Tzadik, 2002)
- Entomological Reflections (Tzadik, 2004)

With Cyro Baptista

- Infinito (Tzadik, 2009)

With Dave Douglas

- Freak In (RCA, 2003)

With Erik Friedlander

- Claws and Wings (Skipstone, 2013)

With Fred Frith and Ensemble Modern

- Traffic Continues (Winter & Winter, 2000)
- Later... (Les Disques VICTO, 2000)
- A Mountain Doesn't Know It's Tall (Intakt Records, 2015)

With Maybe Monday

- Unsquare (Intakt, 2008)

With Rova::Orchestrova

- Electric Ascension (Atavistic, 2005)

With Kim Gordon and DJ Olive

- SYR5: ミュージカル パースペクティブ (Sonic Youth Recordings, 2000)

With George Spanos

- Dreams Beyond (Evolver Records, 2014)

With John Zorn

- Locus Solus (Rift, 1983)
- The Bribe (Tzadik, 1986 [1998])
- Godard/Spillane (Tzadik, 1987 [1999])
- Filmworks III: 1990–1995 (Toy's Factory, 1995)
- Filmworks VI: 1996 (Tzadik, 1996)
- Cobra: John Zorn's Game Pieces Volume 2 (Tzadik, 2002)
- Hemophiliac (Tzadik, 2002) with Hemophiliac
- Voices in the Wilderness (Tzadik, 2003)
- The Unknown Masada (Tzadik, 2003)
- 50th Birthday Celebration Volume 4 (Tzadik, 2004) with Electric Masada
- 50th Birthday Celebration Volume 6 (Tzadik, 2004) with Hemophiliac
- Mysterium (Tzadik, 2005)
- Electric Masada: At the Mountains of Madness (Tzadik, 2005) with Electric Masada
- Filmworks XVI: Workingman's Death (Tzadik, 2005)
- Six Litanies for Heliogabalus (Tzadik, 2007)
- Femina (Tzadik, 2009)
- Interzone (Tzadik, 2010)
- Rimbaud (Tzadik, 2012)
- In Lambeth (Tzadik, 2013) with the Gnostic Trio
- On Leaves of Grass (Tzadik, 2014) with the Nova Quartet

With Medicine Singers

- Medicine Singers(Joyful Noise Recordings)
