= Hemophiliac (album) =

Album by Hemophiliac

Live album by Hemophiliac (John Zorn, Ikue Mori & Mike Patton)
- Released: June 2002
- Genre: Avant-garde
- Length: 128:20
- Label: Tzadik TZ 0001
- Producer: John Zorn

John Zorn chronology
| IAO (2002) | Hemophiliac (2002) | Filmworks XI: Secret Lives (2002) |

Hemophiliac is a limited edition live album of improvised experimental music by John Zorn, Ikue Mori and Mike Patton. The album was released as a limited edition 2-CD set of 2,500 copies, personally autographed by Zorn, Patton and Mori, on Zorn's Tzadik label.

== Reception ==
Professional ratings
Review scores
| Source | Rating |
|---|---|
| Allmusic | 4/5 stars |

The Allmusic review by Dean McFarlane awarded the album 4 stars stating "what a pity this monstrous work was not made more widely available, as it contains some of the more ferocious performances of free improvisation that the members of this trio have put to record throughout their disparate and eclectic careers."

== Track listing ==
All compositions by Mori, Patton & Zorn

Disc One

1. "Skin Eruptions" – 10:59
2. "Edema" – 15:13
3. "Stretch Marks" – 7:13
4. "The Stitch" – 1:14
5. "Malabsorption" – 8:52
6. "High Anxiety" – 11:17
7. "Dizzy Spells" – 4:02
8. "Mood Swing" – 4:16

Disc Two

1. "Gotu Kola" – 8:33
2. "Black Kohosh" – 4:03
3. "The Squaw Vine" – 7:22
4. "Blessed Thistle" – 8:50
5. "Silymarin" – 1:56
6. "Red Clover" – 6:29
7. "Chlorophyll Enemas" – 14:17
8. "The Black Radish" – 1:53
9. "Essence of Primrose" – 3:31
10. "Dong Quai" – 7:57

== Personnel ==
- Ikue Mori – drum machines, electronics
- Mike Patton – voice, electronics
- John Zorn – alto saxophone, voice
