= Malphas: Book of Angels Volume 3 =

Studio album by Sylvie Courvoisier and Mark Feldman
- Released: January 24, 2006
- Recorded: September 28, 2005, Avatar Studios
- Genre: Avant-garde, contemporary classical music, jazz, klezmer
- Length: 46:36
- Label: Tzadik
- Producer: John Zorn

Book of Angels chronology
Azazel: Book of Angels Volume 2 (2005)	Malphas: Book of Angels Volume 3 (2006)	Orobas: Book of Angels Volume 4 (2006)

John Zorn chronology
The Stone: Issue One (2005)	Malphas: Book of Angels Volume 3 (2006)	Filmworks XVII: Notes on Marie Menken/Ray Bandar: A Life with Skulls (2006)

Malphas: Book of Angels Volume 3 is an album by Sylvie Courvoisier and Mark Feldman performing compositions from John Zorn's second Masada book, "The Book of Angels".

== Reception ==
Professional ratings
Review scores
Source	Rating
Allmusic	4/5 stars

The Allmusic review by Thom Jurek awarded the album 4 stars stating "Malphas is a success from start to finish, and perhaps the most exciting of the three volumes in the series thus far. Listeners looking for excellence and adventure would be wise to keep an eye out for this duo, who are perhaps redefining the space for modern composition and performance".

== Track listing ==
All compositions by John Zorn

1. "Azriel" - 4:15
2. "Basus" - 3:28
3. "Rigal" - 4:16
4. "Kafziel" - 4:24
5. "Labariel" - 6:22
6. "Zethar" - 1:49
7. "Paschar" - 5:22 - (title misspelled on sleeve as "Paschal")
8. "Boel" - 4:35
9. "Sammael" - 3:07
10. "Padiel" - 6:29
11. "Vretil" - 2:49 - (title misspelled as "Sretil" on packaging)

== Personnel ==
- Sylvie Courvoisier – piano
- Mark Feldman – violin
