= Susie Ibarra =

American musician (born 1970)

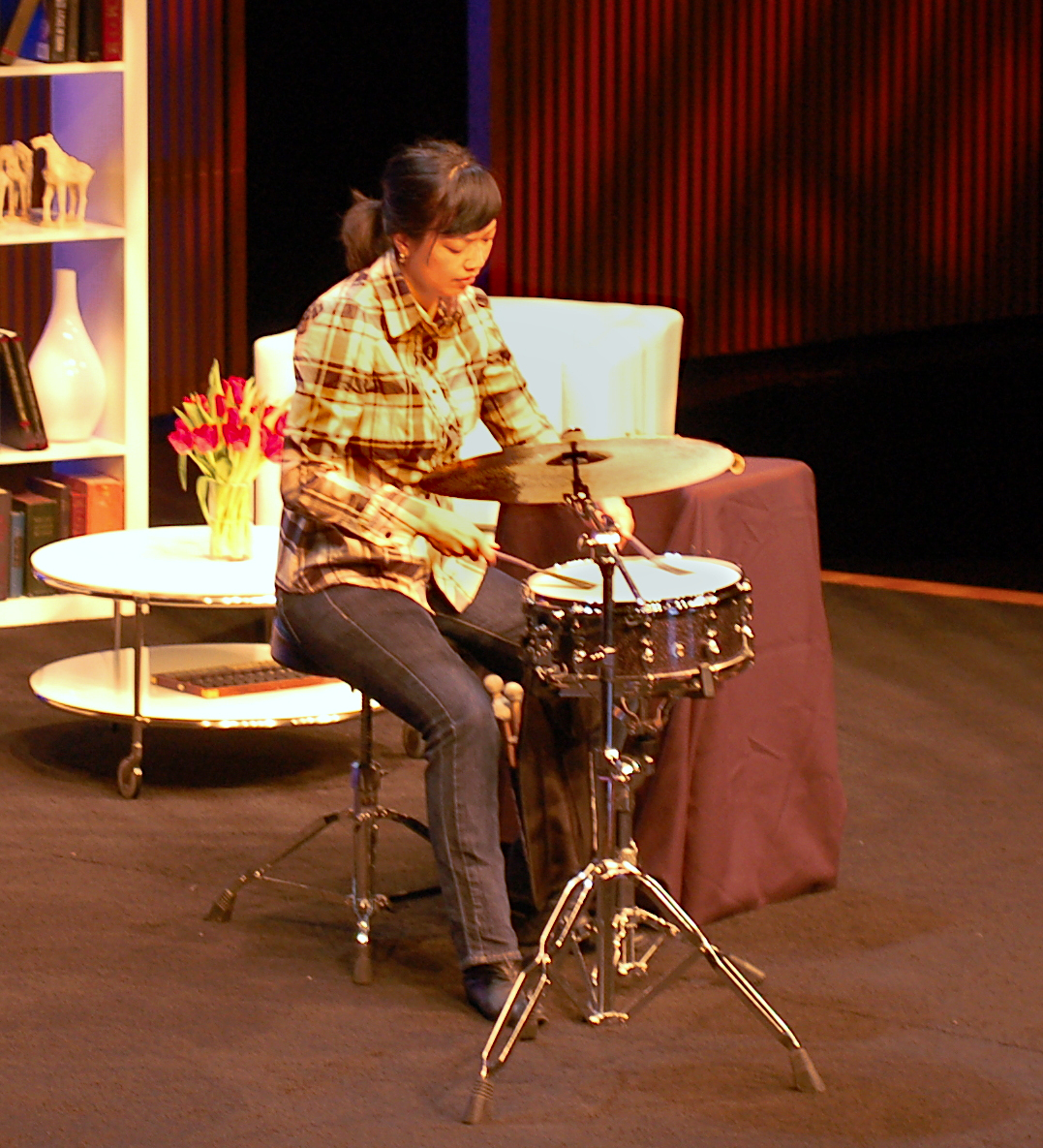
- Ibarra in 2010

Background information
- Born: November 15, 1970 (age 56); Anaheim, California, U.S.
- Genres: avant-garde, experimental, jazz, contemporary classical
- Occupations: Musician, composer
- Instrument: percussion
- Labels: Tzadik, Intakt, Plastic, Innova, Greenleaf, Decibel Collective
- Website: susieibarra.com

Susie Ibarra (born Anaheim, November 15, 1970) is an American contemporary composer and percussionist who has worked and recorded with jazz, classical, world, and indigenous musicians. One of SPIN's "100 Greatest Drummers of Alternative Music", she is known for her work as a performer in avant-garde, jazz, world, and new music. She received the 2025 Pulitzer Prize for Music.

As a composer, Ibarra incorporates diverse styles and the influences of Philippine Kulintang, jazz, classical, poetry, musical theater, opera, and electronic music. Ibarra remains active as a composer, performer, educator, and documentary filmmaker in the U.S., Philippines, and internationally. She is interested and involved in works that blend folkloric and indigenous tradition with avant-garde. In 2004, Ibarra began field recording indigenous Philippine music.

== Early years ==
The youngest of five children, Ibarra was born in Anaheim, California, and raised in Houston, Texas. Her parents Bartolome and Herminia Ibarra were both physicians who immigrated from the Philippines. She began playing piano at the age of four. In grade school she sang in church and school choirs and played in a punk rock band in high school. While at Sarah Lawrence College in the late 1980s, Ibarra attended a Sun Ra performance that she has credited with kindling her interest in jazz. She also attended the Mannes School of Music and Goddard College, where she received her B.A. in music.

Ibarra has lived in New York since 1989. She has studied with notable jazz and avant-jazz drummers Vernel Fournier, Earl Buster Smith, and Milford Graves. She has studied Philippine Kulintang music with National Endowment for the Arts Heritage Artist and Danongan "Danny" Kalanduyan and the Kalanduyan family, in both the U.S. and Cotabato, Mindanao.

== As a performer ==
Ibarra was named "Best Percussionist" in the 2010 Downbeat International Readers Poll and "Best Percussionist, Rising Star" in the 2009 and 2011 Downbeat Critics Poll. Ibarra has been featured on the cover of percussion magazines such as Tom Tom and Modern Drummer. Ibarra is a Yamaha Drums, Vic Firth, and Paiste Cymbals Artist.

Susie Ibarra continues to tour and perform internationally in music festivals and other venues. She has received music commissions and performed her work for Zankel Hall in Carnegie Hall, NYC; Smithsonian Institution, Washington, D.C.; The Kennedy Center, Washington, D.C.; Banlieues Bleues Festival in Paris; Tampere Jazz Happening in Finland; Philippine Women's University in Manila; Lincoln Center in NYC; San Francisco Jazz Festival; TED (conference) in Long Beach, California; Fundació Joan Miró in Barcelona, Spain; the Museum of Modern Art, New York; De Singel in Antwerp; the Barbican Centre in the United Kingdom.

She has performed and recorded with noted artists including Pauline Oliveros, John Zorn, Dave Douglas (trumpeter), Yusef Komunyakaa, Trisha Brown, Tania Leon, Makoto Fujimura, Juan Sanchez, Jim Clark, Jude Tallichet, Laiwan Chung, Min Xiaofen, Derek Bailey, Ikue Mori, Sylvie Courvoisier, William Parker (musician), David S. Ware, Assif Tsahar, Matthew Shipp, Billy Bang, Jeanne Lee, Miya Masaoka, George E. Lewis, Dr. L. Subramaniam, Kavita Krishnamurthi, Wang Ping (author), Luis Francia, Wadada Leo Smith, Mark Dresser, Kathleen Supové, Jennifer Choi, Craig Taborn, Bridget Kibbey, Jade Simmons, Arto Lindsay, Thurston Moore, Prefuse 73, Yo La Tengo, Humanfolk, Mephista.

== Indigenous music and ecology ==
Ibarra began field recording kulintang gong music in the Philippines in 2004. In 2007, she received an Asian Cultural Council Fellowship to research indigenous and folkloric music in the Philippines. Ibarra and Roberto Juan Rodriguez researched, recorded, and filmed seven endangered indigenous tribes in the Philippines from 2008 to 2009 and documented the conservation efforts on behalf of the near extinct Philippine eagle. In 2009, they founded Song of the Bird King to concentrate on the preservation of indigenous music and ecology.

In 2018, the Asian Cultural Council gave Ibarra a fellowship to support her Himalayan Glacier Soundscapes project, during which she traveled along the Ganges River with a glaciologist and research team "recording the sounds of glacial recession."

Ibarra received a 2010 TED Fellowship, a 2010 New York Foundation for the Arts fellowship for music composition, and a 2008 Asian Cultural Council Rockefeller fellowship. The Asia Society nominated her as a delegate of Asia 21 Young World Leaders Summit Unity Through Diversity in Jakarta in 2010.

== Musical works as composer and performer ==
In 2004, Ibarra recorded Folkloriko, a cycle of 11 pieces dedicated to a day in the life of a Filipino migrant worker. The work was premiered at the Freer Gallery of Art of the Smithsonian Institution in conjunction with the first Filipino photography exhibit by Ricardo Alvarado. Recorded on Tzadik Records and performed by Jennifer Choi (violin), Craig Taborn (piano), Wadada Leo Smith (trumpet) and Ibarra (drums and percussion).

In 2007, American Composers Orchestra commissioned Pintados Dream/The Painted's Dream, a drum concerto with Ibarra soloing, a chamber orchestra and visual art by Makoto Fujimura which world premiered at Carnegie Zankel Hall in October of that year.

In February 2007 she composed for a commission by Ars Nova Workshop in Philadelphia, Kit: Music for Four Pianists, eight-hand piano, in an evening work of Ibarra's percussion music.

Also in 2007, her solo CD, Drum Sketches, was commissioned by The Brecht Forum and American Composers Forum on Innova Recordings. These solo pieces are performed and recorded by Ibarra on drum kit, sarunay and kulintang (Philippine xylophone and eight rowed gongs), also including field recordings. They are sonic sketches of Ibarra's sound that include both traditional and avant-garde musical idioms.

In August 2008, MoMa Summergarden and Jazz at Lincoln Center commissioned Ibarra for a premiere of Summer Fantasy and Folklore at the MoMa Summergarden. Ibarra premiered the suite inspired by summers in Houston, New York and Manila with the debut of her quartet featuring Jennifer Choi (violin), Kathleen Supove (piano), Bridget Kibbey (harp) and Susie Ibarra (drumset and percussion).

Also in 2008, Ibarra composed and recorded the music for video installation art, Madre Selva: Homage to Ana Mendieta, created by Visual Artist and Guggenheim Fellow, Juan Sanchez for his exhibition at Lehigh University's Zoellner Arts Center, in Bethlehem, Pennsylvania. The art work is a tribute to the late Cuban American sculptor, installation and performance artist, Ana Mendieta.

In 2010 Music Theatre Group produced two residencies of Saturnalia, a new music theatre work, composed by Ibarra, written by Yusef Komunyakaa, directed by Daniel Fish and music directed by John diPinto. The new music work features 10 actor/singers, the Young Peoples Chorus of NYC, and a chamber ensemble. Saturnalia is a bicultural musical theatre work sung in English and Thai. The story is set in Thailand and portrays the illusion of Paradise that masks a psychological warfare in the minds of US soldiers, and business men and women enslaved in sex trafficking.

In 2024, Ibarra premiered Sky Islands, a piece inspired by southern Filipino gong ensembles and the rainforest ecosystems of Luzon, at New York City's Asia Society. The piece was honored with the 2025 Pulitzer Prize for Music.

== Discography ==
=== As leader ===
- Breathing Together with One World Ensemble (Freedom Jazz 1997)
- Drum Talk with Denis Charles (Wobbly Rail, 1998)
- Radiance (Hopscotch, 1999)
- Daedal with Derek Bailey (Incus, 1999)
- Home Cookin' with Assif Tsahar (Hopscotch, 1999)
- Flower After Flower (Tzadik, 2000)
- Songbird Suite (Tzadik, 2002)
- Bids with Derek Bailey (Incus, 2002)
- Passaggio with Sylvie Courvoisier, Joelle Leandre (Intakt, 2002)
- Tone Time with Mark Dresser (Wobbly Rail, 2003)
- 50 with Wadada Leo Smith, John Zorn (Tzadik, 2004)
- Folkloriko (Tzadik, 2004)
- Dialects as EK with Roberto Juan Rodriguez (Plastic, 2006)
- Drum Sketches (Innova, 2007)
- New Sanctuary Trio with Dave Douglas, Marc Ribot (Greenleaf, 2016)
- Perception (Decibel Collective, 2018)
- Talking Gong with Claire Chase, Alex Peh (New Focus Recordings, 2021)
- Walking on Water with Makoto Fujimura (Culture Care, 2021)

With Mephista (Ibarra, Sylvie Courvoisier and Ikue Mori)

- Black Narcissus (Tzadik, 2002)
- Entomological Reflections (Tzadik, 2004)

=== As guest ===
- Eugene Chadbourne, Pain Pen (Avant, 2000)
- Dave Douglas, El Trilogy (BMG, 2001)
- Lisle Ellis, Sucker Punch Requiem (Henceforth, 2008)
- Dennis Gonzalez, Herido Live at St. James Cathedral Chicago (8th Harmonic Breakdown, 2001)
- Ori Kaplan, Gongol (Knitting Factory, 2001)
- Roberto Juan Rodriguez, El Danzon De Moises (Tzadik, 2002)
- Matthew Shipp, The Multiplication Table (hatOLOGY, 1998)

With John Lindberg

- Ruminations Upon Ives and Gottschalk (Between the Lines, 2003)
- Winter Birds (Between the Lines, 2004)

With William Parker

- Flowers Grow in My Room (Centering, 1994)
- Compassion Seizes Bed-Stuy (Homestead, 1996)
- Sunrise in the Tone World (AUM Fidelity, 1997)
- Mass for the Healing of the World (Black Saint, 2003)
- The Peach Orchard (AUM Fidelity, 1998)
- Posium Pendasem (FMP, 1999)

With Wadada Leo Smith

- Lake Biwa (Tzadik, 2004)
- Ten Freedom Summers (Cuneiform, 2012)

With Assif Tsahar

- Shekhina (Eremite, 1996)
- Ein Sof (Silkheart, 1997)
- The Hollow World (Hopscotch, 1999)

With David S. Ware

- Godspelized (DIW, 1996)
- Wisdom of Uncertainty (AUM Fidelity, 1997)
- Go See the World (Columbia, 1998)
- Live in the World (Thirsty Ear, 2005)

With Yo La Tengo

- And Then Nothing Turned Itself Inside-Out (Matador, 2000)
- Saturday (Matador, 2000)
- Nuclear War (Matador, 2002)

With John Zorn

- Cobra: John Zorn's Game Pieces Volume 2 (Tzadik, 2002)
- Voices in the Wilderness (Tzadik, 2003)
- 50th Birthday Celebration Volume 8 (Tzadik, 2004)
