= Lotte Anker =

Danish jazz saxophonist, and composer

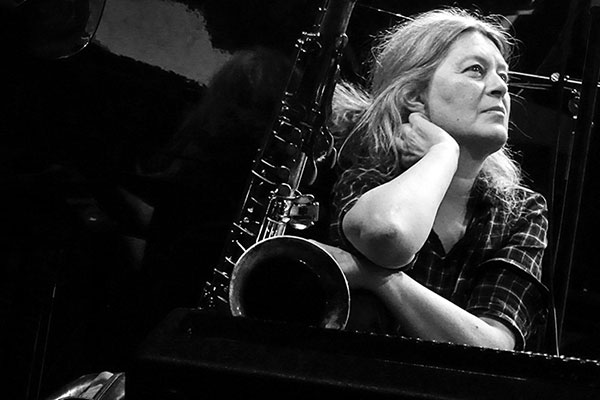
- Lotte Anker in Aarhus 2016

Background information
- Born: 1958 (age 67–68); Copenhagen, Denmark
- Genres: Jazz
- Occupations: Musician, composer
- Instrument: Saxophone
- Years active: 1988–present
- Labels: Dacapo, Utech, Leo, Intakt
- Website: www.lotteanker.com

Lotte Anker (born 1958) is a Danish jazz saxophonist, and composer. With pianist Marilyn Crispell, she serves as one of the co-leaders of the Copenhagen Art Ensemble.

== Musical career ==
Anker was born in Copenhagen and studied music at Copenhagen University from 1980 to 1984. In 1988, she formed a quartet with piano player Mette Petersen, (the Lotte Anker / Mette Petersen Quartet). In 1992, they added trumpeter Nils Petter Molvær. In 1995, she became a member of the free improvising trio Anker, Friis, Poulsen with Hasse Poulsen on guitar and Peter Friis Nielsen on bass.

Since 1996, Anker and Ture Larsen have been co-leaders of the 12-piece orchestra Copenhagen Art Ensemble. She recorded the albums Triptych, Live at the Loft and Floating Islands with pianist Craig Taborn, and drummer Gerald Cleaver.

== Discography ==
- Beyond the Mist (Stunt, 1989)
- Being (Stunt, 1993)
- Infinite Blueness (Av-Art, 1996)
- Poetic Justice (Dacapo, 2001)
- Six Row Barley (Utech, 2005)
- Triptych (Leo, 2005)
- Alien Huddle (Intakt, 2008)
- Live at the Loft (ILK, 2009)
- Floating Islands (ILK, 2009)
- Birthmark (Clean Feed, 2013)
- Squid Police (Konvoj, 2014) with Jakob Riis
- What River Is This (ILK, 2014)
- Edge of the Light (Intakt, 2014) with Fred Frith
- Plodi (Klopotec, 2017)
- His Flight's at Ten (Iluso, 2018) with Pat Thomas, Ingebrigt Håker Flaten, Ståle Liavik Solberg

With Tim Berne

- Open, Coma (Screwgun, 2001)

With Fred Frith

- Storytelling (Intuition, 2017)

With Fred Frith Trio

- Road (Intakt, 2021)
