= Abaton (album) =

Studio album by Sylvie Courvoisier
- Released: October 14, 2003
- Recorded: September 2002
- Studios: Rainbow Studio; Oslo, Norway
- Genres: Contemporary classical music, improvised music, jazz
- Length: 106:36
- Labels: ECM; ECM 1838/39
- Producer: Manfred Eicher

Sylvie Courvoisier chronology
Black Narcissus (2002)	Abaton (2003)	Entomological Reflections (2004)

Abaton is a double album by Swiss pianist and composer Sylvie Courvoisier, recorded in September 2002 and released on ECM the following year, featuring one disc of compositions and one of improvisations. The trio consists violinist Mark Feldman and cellist Erik Friedlander.

== Composition ==
Disc one consists of four Courvoisier compositions whereas disc two contains 19 improvisations for trio. Thom Jurek of AllMusic writes the two discs are "very different" but "nonetheless dovetail to offer a solid portrait of a composer-led group that views stasis and movement with equanimity."

=== Disc one ===
"Ianicum" opens with Courvoisier playing a single lower-register pitch on her piano which is repeated and answered by the other members of the trio in brief phrases before turning into a twinned line "where left and right hands move seemingly in opposition yet with such restraint that the music is seamless."

Feldman opens "Abaton" with a succession of clipped series of notes from his middle register. He then engages Freiedlander via slowly developing successions of nearly pulsing lines which touch upon both Western counterpoint and Eastern modalism. To anchor the lengthening lines and return them "back to point," Courvoisier plays a single chord, with a "spacious, Messiaen-like austerity" is replaced by more frequent pronouncements until, in Jurek's words, "she becomes interwoven contrapuntally with the pair in a warm yet dissonant melody line that feels almost Occidental in its origin."

== Reception ==
Professional ratings
Review scores
Source	Rating
AllMusic	4.5/5 stars
The Penguin Guide to Jazz Recordings	3.5/4 stars

AllMusic awarded the album 4½ stars and in its review by Thom Jurek, he states "Abaton is Courvoisier's crowning achievement thus far, and this group points her firmly forward in a direction where everything is still possible, demonstrating that there is something new under the sun in classical music and improvisation. Perhaps Abaton is the great moment of 2003 for new classical music."

In JazzTimes, Andrew Lindemann Malone wrote "It's rare to hear modern classical music forged anew in the heat of improvisation, but that's exactly what Abaton does."

On All About Jazz Kurt Gottschalk observed "Courvoisier's compositions are perhaps distinctly 21st century in the way they fit into a continuum of composed chamber work. They reflect without being ironic, refer without being referential. All in all, a refreshingly post-postmodern approach."

== Track listing ==
All tracks are written by Sylvie Courvoisier.

Disc one: Ianicum / Orodruin / Poco a poco / Abaton
No.	Title	Length
1.	"Ianicum"	19:55
2.	"Orodruin"	12:33
3.	"Poco a poco"	9:24
4.	"Abaton"	11:29

All tracks are written by Sylvie Courvoisier, Mark Feldman and Erik Friedlander.

Disc two: Nineteen improvisations
No.	Title	Length
1.	"Icaria 1"	4:04
2.	"Imke's"	2:08
3.	"Icaria 2"	3:30
4.	"Clio"	2:46
5.	"Nova Solyma"	4:42
6.	"Spensonia"	3:38
7.	"Octavia"	3:34
8.	"Icaria 3"	2:37
9.	"Sonnante"	3:37
10.	"The Scar of Lotte"	1:35
11.	"Turoine"	1:04
12.	"Archaos"	3:37
13.	"Ava's"	1:30
14.	"Brobdingnag"	1:29
15.	"Calonack"	2:55
16.	"Precioso"	2:46
17.	"Sekel"	1:26
18.	"Izaura"	2:51
19.	"Narnia"	1:50

== Personnel ==
=== Abaton ===
- Sylvie Courvoisier – piano
- Mark Feldman – violin
- Erik Friedlander – cello

=== Technical personnel ===
- Manfred Eicher – producer
- Jan Erik Kongshaug – engineer
- Sascha Kleis – design
- Roberto Masotti – cover photography
- Deborah Feingold – liner photos

== Notes ==
- Recorded at Rainbow Studio in Oslo, Norway in September 2002
