= Calling All Mothers =

Studio album by NRG Ensemble
- Released: 1994
- Recorded: November 1993 at Streetville Studios, Chicago
- Genre: Jazz
- Length: 55:51
- Label: Quinnah Records; Q05
- Producer: Mars Williams & Steve Lake

NRG Ensemble chronology
The Hal Russell Story (1992)	Calling All Mothers (1994)	This Is My House (1996)

Calling All Mothers is an album by American jazz group the NRG Ensemble, their first after the death of bandleader, and multi-instrumentalist Hal Russell, which was recorded in 1993 and released on the Quinnah label.

== Reception ==
Professional ratings
Review scores
Source	Rating
AllMusic	4/5 stars
DownBeat	4/5 stars
The Penguin Guide to Jazz	3.5/4 stars

The AllMusic review by William York states that "the album has a nice element of diversity, yet it still coheres well... They play virtually every piece like it's an encore, but, fortunately, the material is strong enough to sustain such intensity".

The DownBeat review by Bill Shoemaker states: "Though the set includes three Russell pieces utilizing everything from nimble swing pastiches to full-bore sax blasts, the compositional strengths of Williams, Hunt and newcomer multi-reedist Ken Vandermark preclude the possibility of NRG ever becoming a ghost band."

== Track listing ==
1. "Punch and Judy (For Fred Anderson)" (Ken Vandermark) - 5:26
2. "Chasin' My Tail" (Mars Williams) - 3:28
3. "Memory Seek" (Steve Hunt) - 8:32
4. "Symposium/Mr. Happy" (Williams) - 5:07
5. "You Never Buy Me Anything" (NRG Ensemble) - 6:27
6. "American Tan (For Stanley Kubrick)" (Vandermark) - 7:16
7. "Kiteless String" (Williams) - 3:18
8. "Calling All Mothers" (Hal Russell) - 4:50
9. "You're My Dream" (Hal Russell) - 3:56
10. "Beneath the Weather (For Steve Lacy)" (Vandermark) - 3:57
11. "sraM" (Hal Russell) - 4:20

== Personnel ==
- Mars Williams - tenor saxophone, alto saxophone, soprano saxophone
- Ken Vandermark - tenor saxophone, clarinet, bass clarinet
- Brian Sandstrom - bass, trumpet, electric guitar
- Kent Kessler - bass, bass guitar, didgeridoo
- Steve Hunt -- drums, vibraphone, marimba, didgeridoo
