= Hoofbeats of the Snorting Swine =

Studio album by Cinghiale
- Released: 1996
- Recorded: March 17 & August 8, 1995; January 1 & February 15, 1996
- Studio: Warzone Recorders, Chicago
- Genre: Jazz
- Length: 65:08
- Label: Eighth Day Music
- Producer: Mars Williams, Ken Vandermark

Mars Williams chronology
Eftsoons (1984)	Hoofbeats of the Snorting Swine (1996)	At the Empty Bottle (2000)

Ken Vandermark chronology
Utility Hitter (1996)	Hoofbeats of the Snorting Swine (1996)	Blow Horn (1997)

Hoofbeats of the Snorting Swine is an album by Cinghiale, a reed duo composed of Mars Williams and Ken Vandermark, which was released in 1996 on Eighth Day Music. At the time of recording Vandermark was member of the post-Hal Russell NRG Ensemble under Williams' leadership.

== Reception ==
Professional ratings
Review scores
Source	Rating
The Penguin Guide to Jazz	3.5/4 stars

The Penguin Guide to Jazz states "Typical Vandermark in that it feels as if the duo is running (or careering) down composed lines, even as they blow right away from them... A dialogue for two epic sensibilities."

== Track listing ==
1. "Triple Double" (Vandermark) – 10:35
2. "Rat Bastard" (Williams) – 3:33
3. "Uncle Ferenze" (Williams) – 7:04
4. "Front Line" (Vandermark) – 13:31
5. "Trunk Manuscripts" (Vandermark) – 9:15
6. "Rat Bastard Also" (Williams) – 4:26
7. "Give and Take" (Vandermark) – 6:39
8. "Road Hog" (Williams) – 10:05

== Personnel ==
- Mars Williams – tenor saxophone, alto saxophone, soprano saxophone, B-flat clarinet
- Ken Vandermark – tenor saxophone, B-flat clarinet, bass clarinet
