= Liquid Soul =

American music ensemble

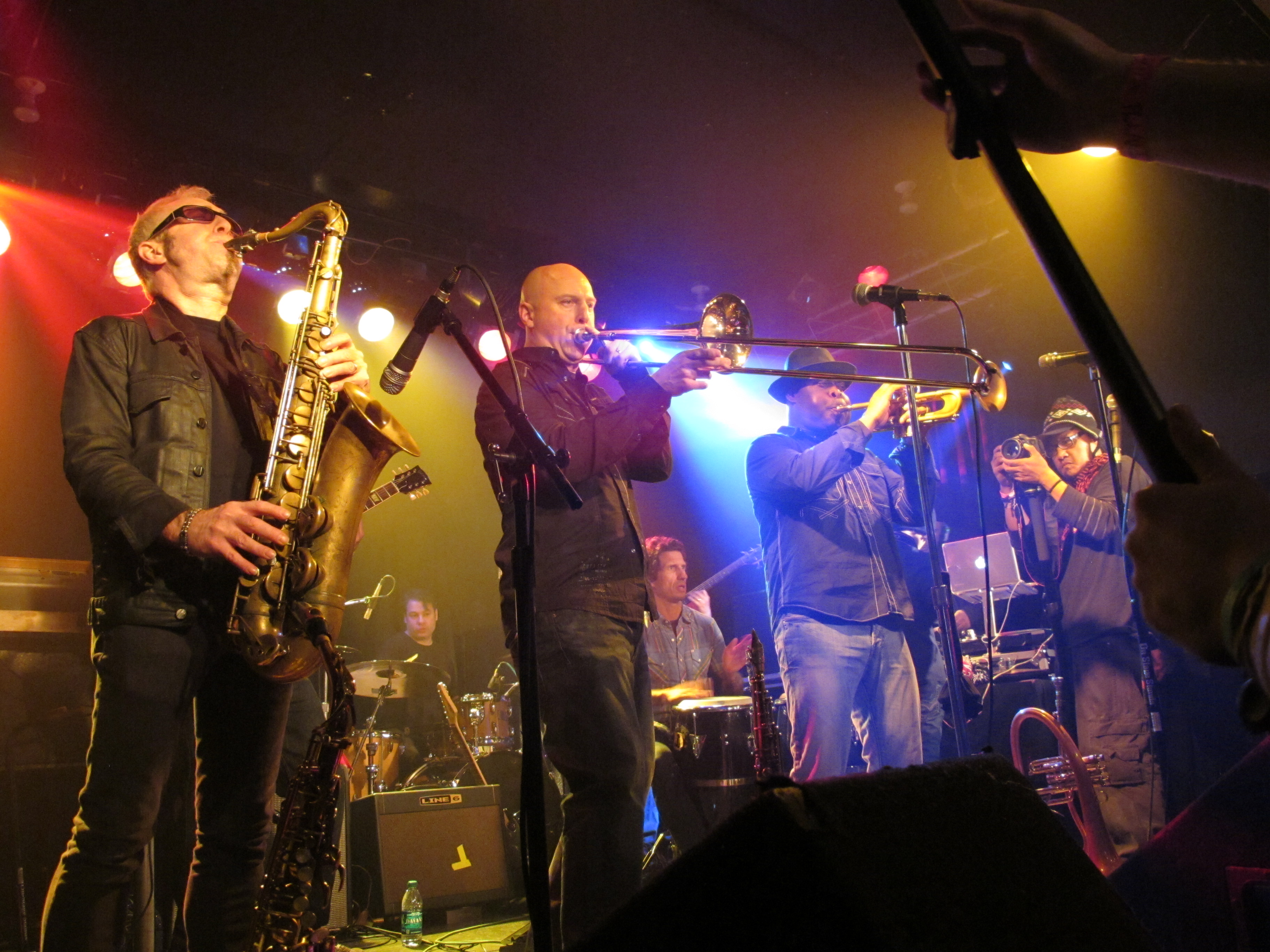
Liquid Soul horn section during their 20th anniversary show at the Double Door, January 2013

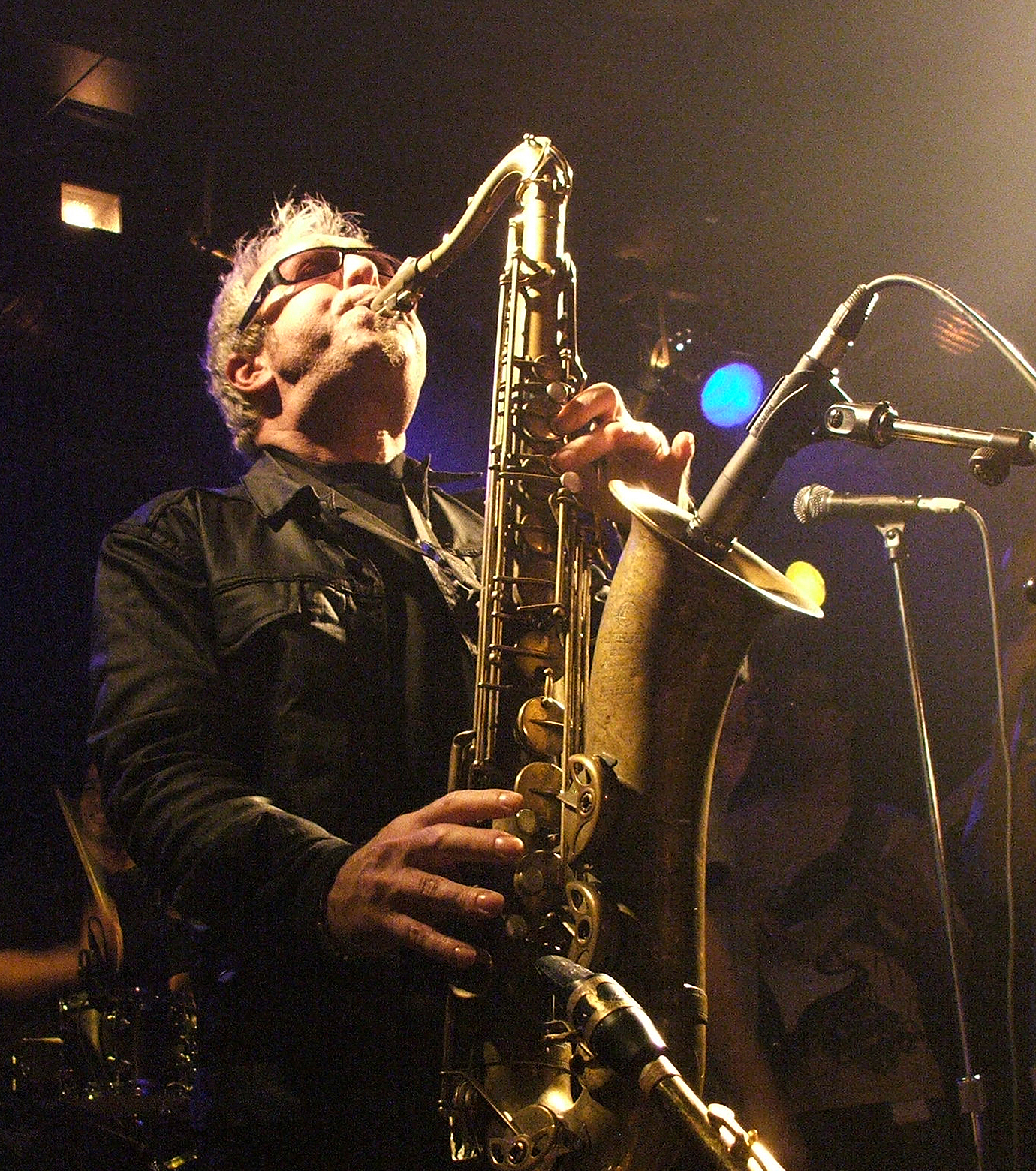
Mars Williams, with Liquid Soul at the Double Door January 2011

Liquid Soul is an American jazz, hip-hop, funk, freestyle fusion ensemble, formed in 1993 from Chicago, Illinois, which helped pioneer the acid jazz movement in the United States in the 1990s. Coined "Beyond Acid Jazz" by founder Mars Williams who played with the Psychedelic Furs, the Waitresses, the Power Station, Billy Squier, and Billy Idol. The group was co-founded by guitarist Tommy Klein, from the Spies Who Surf, and Chicago DJ Jesse De La Peña. The band's 2000 album Here's the Deal was nominated for a Grammy in the Best Contemporary Jazz Album category.

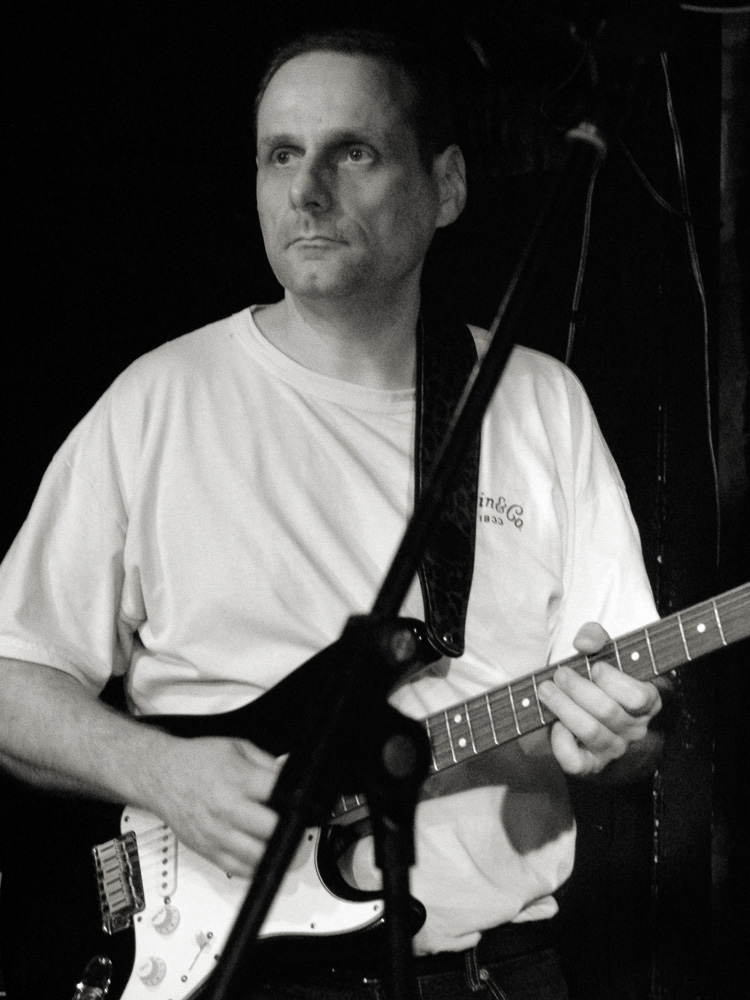
Tom Klein

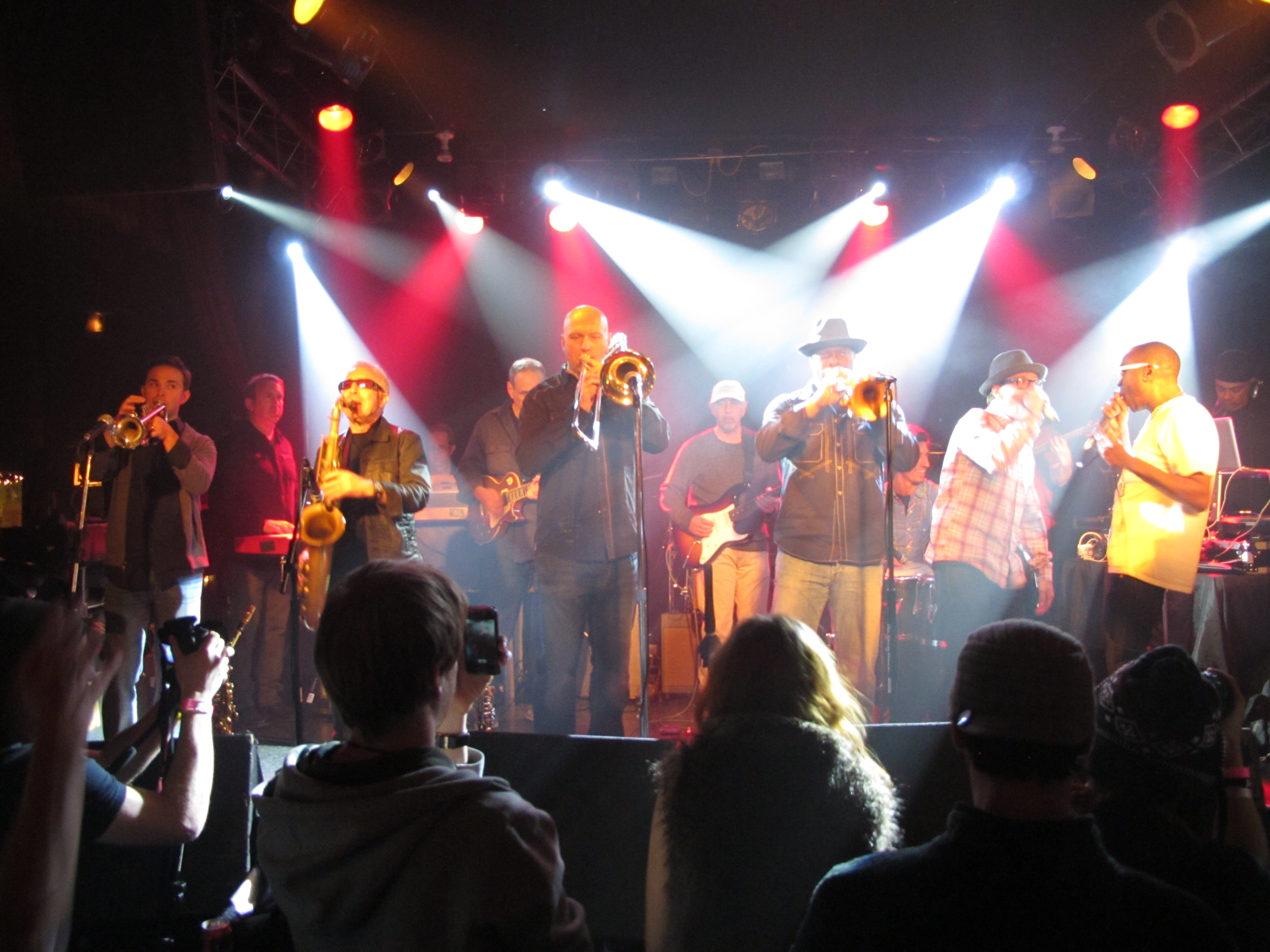
Liquid Soul during their 20th Anniversary Show at the Double Door, January 2013

== History ==
Their first regular venue was at Chicago's Elbo Room, where their quickly-growing popularity led to the release of their self-titled, debut album Liquid Soul by Ark 21 Records. A well-popularized appearance at Dennis Rodman's birthday party added to their notoriety. They were the main feature at Double Door in Wicker Park for almost four years (Feb. 1996 to Dec. 1999). Subsequent tours took them across the United States and Canada, plus performances in Germany, Turkey and Japan. They have opened for Sting and Isaac Hayes, played at Bill Clinton's second Inaugural Parade and 21st Century Ball, and were the first acid jazz band to play at the Newport Jazz Festival. They also appeared twice at the South By Southwest Music Festival where the Austin American-Statesman referred to them as "the single hottest showcase of the festival." They have recorded four more CDs: Make Some Noise (produced by Ark 21 Records in 1998), Grammy-nominated Here's the Deal (produced by Shanachie Records in 2000), Evolution (produced by Shanachie in 2002) and most recently One-Two Punch (produced by major label Telarc in 2006).

== Notable performances and venues ==
- Metro Chicago Music for Mars Tribute, Chicago, Nov 25 2023
- Double Door Liquid Soul 20th Anniversary Show, Chicago, Jan 20 2013
- Niwot Jazz on 2nd Avenue, Niwot, CO Aug 19 2012
- Double Door Liquid Soul 15th Anniversary Show, Chicago, Jan 18 2009
- Sting opening shows (Central Park, New York City; Blockbuster Pavilion, Charlotte, NC; Alltel Pavilion, Raleigh, NC), Sept. 2000
- Chicago Jazz Festival, Sept. 2000
- Jazz Wind 2000 Festival in Furano, Japan, Aug. 2000
- Newport Jazz Festival in Madarao, Japan, Aug. 2000
- Sioux Falls Jazz and Blues Festival, July 2000
- Ravinia Festival with Isaac Hayes, July 2000
- Cancun Jazz Festival, Mexico (May 2000)
- Music Midtown Festival, Atlanta, Ga. (May 2000)
- New Orleans Jazz & Heritage Festival (May 2000)
- Babylon Club, Istanbul, Turkey (January 2000)
- Jacksonville Jazz Festival, Jacksonville, Fla. (November 1999)
- Aspen Jazz Festival, Snowmass Village, Colo. (September 1999)
- Sweet Pea Festival, Bozeman, Mont. (August 1999)
- Kansas City Blues & Jazz Festival, Kansas City, Mo. (July 1999)
- Lodo Music Festival, Denver, Colo. (July 1999)
- Black & White Ball, San Francisco (June 1999)
- Indianapolis Jazz Festival (June 1999)
- Canadian Jazz Festival Tour: Winnipeg, Saskatoon, Vancouver, Victoria, Edmonton, Calgary (June–July 1999)
- Moers Festival, Moers, Germany (May 1997, May 1999 and May 2004)
- Festival International de Jazz de Montreal (July 1998)
- Montreux-Detroit Jazz Festival, Detroit (September 1998)
- The Cubby Bear, Chicago (February 1998)
- U.S. President Bill Clinton's Inaugural Parade and 21st Century Ball, Washington, D.C. (January 1997)
- The Theater at Madison Square Garden, New York City (opened for two Sting concerts, March 1997)
- A Taste of Chicago, Petrillo Music Shell, Grant Park, Chicago (July 4, 1997)
- JVC Jazz Festival, Newport, R.I. (August 1997)
- Dennis Rodman's birthday party, Crobar, Chicago (May 1996)
- Nationwide club and festival touring (fall 1996 to present) with well over 100 performances per year.

== Band members ==
- Ricky Showalter – Bass
- Brian "MCB" Quarles – MC
- Dirty MF – MC
- Tommy Klein – Guitar
- My Boy Elroy – Beatbox/DJ
- Ron Haynes – original Trumpet
- John Janowiak – Trombone
- Devin Staples - Drums

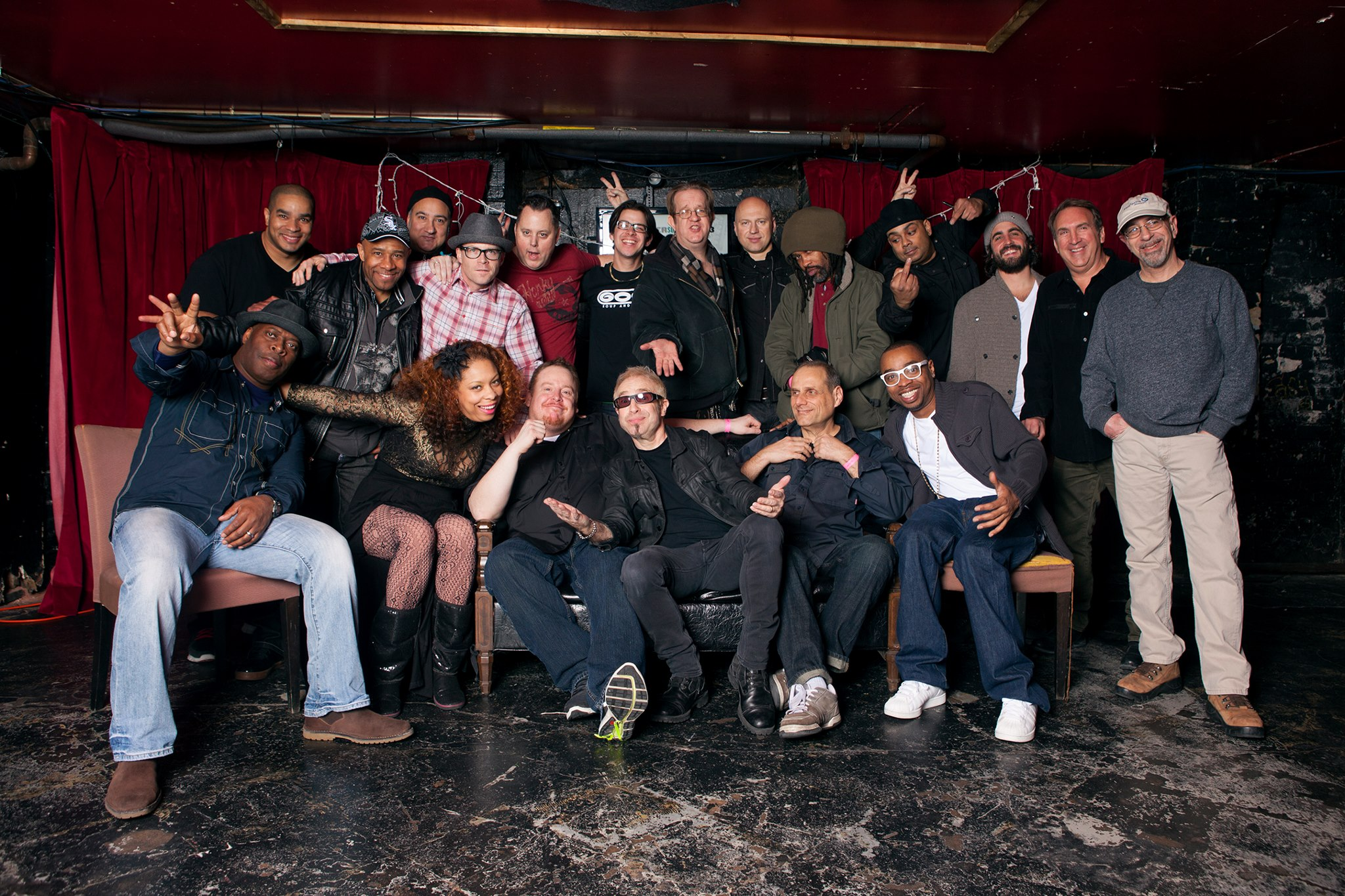
Liquid Soul 20th Anniversary Band at the Double Door January 2013

Past members include...

- Mars Williams – Saxophone
- Simone – Vocals
- Race – MC
- Mr. Greenweedz – MC
- Dan Leali – Drums
- Jonathan Marks – Drums
- Bret Zwier – Drums
- Hugh Ragin – Trumpet
- Doug Corcoran – Trumpet/Keyboards
- Andrew Distel - Trumpet
- Omega (Vikki Stokes) - Vocals
- Andy Baker – Trombone
- Tony Taylor – Drums
- Tom Sanchez – Guitar
- Eddie Mills – DJ
- DJ Logic – DJ
- Ajax – DJ
- Jesse De La Pena – original DJ
- Josh Ramos – Bass
- Phil Ajjarapu – Bass
- Newt Cole – Percussion
- Frankie Hill – Keyboards

== Discography ==
- Liquid Soul (1996)
- Make Some Noise (1998)
- Here's the Deal (2000)
- Evolution (2002)
- One-Two Punch (2006)
- Lost Soul, Vol 1. (2021)
