= This Is My House =

Studio album by NRG Ensemble
- Released: 1996
- Recorded: January 30 & 31, 1995
- Studio: Riverside Studio, Chicago
- Genre: Jazz
- Length: 66:47
- Label: Delmark
- Producer: Steve Lake & Mars Williams

NRG Ensemble chronology
Calling All Mothers (1994)	This Is My House (1996)	Bejazzo Gets a Facelift (1998)

This Is My House is an album by American jazz group the NRG Ensemble, their second with saxophonist Ken Vandermark in place of the bandleader and multi-instrumentalist Hal Russell, which was recorded in 1995 and released on Delmark.

== Reception ==
Professional ratings
Review scores
Source	Rating
AllMusic	2.5/5 stars
The Penguin Guide to Jazz	3/4 stars
Down Beat	4/5 stars

The AllMusic review by William York states "Such moments certainly make the album worthwhile for fans, but due to its somewhat inconsistent, under-edited nature (i.e., it is simply too long), This Is My House doesn't rate as the best starting point for folks interested in this group."

The Down Beat review by John Ephland says "The material at times seems somewhat colorless, the structures maybe a tad rangy and undeveloped. Still, the band's emotional and stylistic range, Kessler and Sandstrom's very fine doubled-up-basses, not to mention the instrumental variety from everyone, suggest an exciting, loving caldron of free-jazz, bop, and hardcore punk-jazz."

== Track listing ==
1. "Hyperspace" (Mars Williams) - 6:21
2. "Cut Flowers" (Ken Vandermark) - 13:29
3. "Whirlwind" (Mars Williams) - 11:02
4. "Bullseye Witness" (Ken Vandermark) - 10:48
5. "Bustanut" (Mars Williams) - 3:52
6. "Burnt Toast" (Mars Williams) - 6:51
7. "Straight Time" (Ken Vandermark) - 4:23
8. "In the Middle of Pennsylvania" (Steve Hunt) - 10:01

== Personnel ==
- Mars Williams - tenor sax, alto sax, soprano sax, clarinet, woodflute, toys
- Ken Vandermark - tenor sax, bass clarinet, clarinet
- Kent Kessler - acoustic bass, electric bass
- Brian Sandstrom - acoustic bass, electric guitar, trumpet
- Steve Hunt - drums, vibraphone, marimba, percussion
- Daniel Scalan - violin on 2
- Don Meckley - short wave radio on 8
