= Standards (Ken Vandermark album) =

Studio album by Ken Vandermark
- Released: 1995
- Recorded: July 25–28, 1994
- Studio: Sparrow Sound Design, Chicago
- Genre: Jazz
- Length: 68:22
- Label: Quinnah

Ken Vandermark chronology
Solid Action (1994)	Standards (1995)	International Front (1995)

Standards is an album by American jazz reedist Ken Vandermark, which was recorded in 1994 and released on the Quinnah label.

== Background ==
In the four sessions that produced the record, Vandermark chose from the large number of colleagues with whom he's got ongoing relationships and mix-and-matched them in four new improvising trios with different instrumental combinations.

The initial inspiration for the project came for a similar one undertaken by German bassist Peter Kowald and a monthly series of improvisations called "Head Exam" at Chicago's HotHouse modelled after Derek Bailey's Company Week, which uses a free format to get people who don't usually play together to collaborate.

The first lineup, with longtime partner bassist Kent Kessler and new associate drummer Hamid Drake, would be named later DKV Trio. Vandermark wanted to pair himself with another reed player and he chose NRG Ensemble co-saxophonist Mars Williams and asked Vandermark Quartet drummer Michael Zerang to join them. For the third combination, he is joined by Jim Baker, pianist in Caffeine, and Vandermark Quartet guitarist and violinist Daniel Scanlan. The last trio includes tabletop guitarist Kevin Drumm and percussionist Steve Hunt, third leg of Caffeine and drummer for the NRG Ensemble.

== Reception ==
Professional ratings
Review scores
Source	Rating
The Penguin Guide to Jazz	3.5/4 stars

The Penguin Guide to Jazz states "Standards is experimental in that it sets Vandermark up as a member of four different trios... Each has something interesting to yield and some of it sounds almost glaringly new and alive."

== Track listing ==
1. "From the Force of the Term" – 7:02
2. "Spirit of the Staircase" – 5:27
3. "Out of Mere Impulse" – 8:52
4. "Variant Reading" – 7:16
5. "Experimental Trial" – 6:09
6. "A Sick Man's Dreams" – 6:26
7. "Year of His Age" – 5:07
8. "It Is Solved By Walking" – 3:54
9. "Nostalgia for the Mud" – 4:12
10. "To Draw Back in Order To Make a Better Jump" – 4:30
11. "Rage for Speaking" – 4:45
12. "Word for Word and Letter for Letter" – 4:42

== Personnel ==
- Ken Vandermark – reeds
- Hamid Drake – trap set, hand drums (tracks 1–3)
- Kent Kessler – bass (tracks 1–3)
- Mars Williams – saxophones (tracks 4–6)
- Michael Zerang – trap set (tracks 4–6)
- Jim Baker – piano, ARP synthesizer (tracks 7–9)
- Daniel Scanlan – electric guitar, violin (tracks 7–9)
- Kevin Drumm – electric guitar (tracks 10–12)
- Steve Hunt – trap set (tracks 10–12)
