= Liquid Soul (album) =

Studio album by Liquid Soul
- Released: October 29, 1996
- Recorded: March 2–3, 1995
- Genre: Acid jazz
- Length: 60:40
- Label: Ark 21

Liquid Soul chronology
| Liquid Soul (1996) | Make Some Noise (1998) |

Professional ratings
Review scores
| Source | Rating |
|---|---|
| AllMusic | 4/5 stars |

Liquid Soul is the self-titled debut album by Liquid Soul.

== Track listing ==
1. "Preview" – 0:26
2. "World's On A Leash" – 4:36
3. "Schitzophrenia" – 3:37
4. "Equinox" – 5:05
5. "The Good One" – 0:14
6. "Afro Loop" – 5:22
7. "Java Junkie" – 4:43
8. "New E" – 4:19
9. "Righteous" – 4:44
10. "Footprints" – 4:19
11. "Jazz Machine" – 3:37
12. "Black Earth" – 3:01
13. "What A Story" – 2:47
14. "Blue Groove Freestyle" – 9:41
15. "Freddie The Freeloader" – 4:09
16. "Your Time Is Up" – 0:18

== Personnel ==
- Jesse De La Pena – Turntables
- Ron Haynes – Trumpet, Flugelhorn
- Frankie Hill – Keyboards
- Tommy Klein – Guitar
- Dan Leali – Percussion, Drums
- Ricky Showalter – Bass
- Mars Williams – Saxophone, Producer, Mixing

== Production ==
- Mark Bales – Engineer
- Rick Barnes – Editing, Mixing, Pre-Mastering
- Van Christie – Mixing
- Steve Jacula – Engineer, Mixing
- Neil Jensen – Engineer, Assistant Engineer, Mixing, Live Sound
- Jim Marcus – Editing
- Mars – Mixing
- Jason More – Design
- Sandy Sager – Photography
- David Suycott – Editing
- Matt Warren – Engineer, Mixing
