= NRG Ensemble (album) =

Studio album by Hal Russell NRG Ensemble
- Released: 1981
- Recorded: May 11, 1981
- Studio: Solid Sound
- Genre: Jazz
- Length: 47:15
- Label: Nessa
- Producer: Chuck Nessa

Hal Russell chronology
Elixir (1979)	NRG Ensemble (1981)	Eftsoons (1981)

NRG Ensemble is the debut album by American jazz multi-instrumentalist Hal Russell, which was recorded in 1981 and released on Nessa. It was reissued in 2012 with new artwork and two bonus tracks previously unreleased from a demo tape the band gave to producer Chuck Nessa prior to the sessions.

== Background ==
By the time he made his first commercially released LP with the NRG Ensemble in 1981, Hal Russell had already spent the better part of a decade experimenting with different sidemen, formations and instrumentations. This early version of the band included drummer and vibist Steve Hunt, two bassists, Brian Sandstrom and Curt Bley, and reedist Chuck Burdelik, a replacement for the departed Mars Williams, who left the group to tour with rock bands The Waitresses and The Psychedelic Furs. In addition to the drums, vibes, and saxophone, Russell threw in some shenai, cornet, and zither.

== Reception ==
The Tiny Mix Tapes review by Clifford Allen says about the 2012 reissue "this wonderfully remastered and augmented early set is indispensable for fans of contemporary improvisation and those who want to hear more of Chicago’s creative music roots."

== Track listing ==
All compositions by Hal Russell

1. "Uncontrollable Rages" – 18:20
2. "Kit Kat" – 5:40
3. "Linda Jazz Princess" – 18:10
4. "Seven Spheres" – 5:05

Bonus tracks (2012 CD reissue)

5. "Lost Or?" - 11:50
6. "C Melody Mania" - 13:05

Recorded January 10, 1981

== Personnel ==
- Hal Russell – drums, vibes, C melody saxophone, shenai, cornet, zither
- Chuck Burdelik – tenor saxophone, alto saxophone, clarinet, flute
- Brian Sandstrom – bass, trumpet, gong
- Curt Bley – bass
- Steve Hunt – vibes, drums
