= Hidden in the Stomach =

Studio album by AALY Trio + Ken Vandermark
- Released: 1998
- Recorded: December 18, 1996
- Studio: Europa Studios, Stockholm
- Genre: Jazz
- Length: 54:32
- Label: Silkheart
- Producer: Keith Knox

Ken Vandermark chronology
Like Rays (1998)	Hidden in the Stomach (1998)	Target or Flag (1998)

Hidden in the Stomach is the debut album by the AALY Trio + Ken Vandermark, which was recorded in 1996 and released on the Swedish Silkheart label.

== Background ==
AALY Trio is a Swedish free jazz band composed of saxophonist Mats Gustafsson, bassist Peter Janson and drummer Kjell Nordeson. The name "AALY" is derived from an Art Ensemble of Chicago composition, "Lebert Aaly," which is itself a near anagram of Albert Ayler's name. Nordeson is Gustafsson's oldest playing partner, their work together dating back to shared childhood in the northern city of Umeå, while Janson joined the group rather recently.The band has also existed in a quartet version with pianist Per Henrik Wallin. The association between Gustafsson and Vandermark began in 1994, when the Swedish visited Chicago for the first of what has turned into many times. The two reed players formed a quartet called FJF with a Chicago rhythm section. In December, 1996, Vandermark joined AALY for a tour of Sweden which culminated in this studio recording.

The FJF debut, Blow Horn, includes a different version of "Structure à la Malle", with the same basic formal skeleton but without the composed melodic theme heard on Hidden in the Stomach. The album includes two covers: Charlie Haden's classic "Song For Che" and a medley of Albert Ayler's "Ghosts" and "Spirits".

== Reception ==
Professional ratings
Review scores
Source	Rating
AllMusic	4/5 stars

In his review for AllMusic, Brian Olewnick states " The playing is often turbulent and roiling, but never wanders so far afield as to become divorced from the structure of the compositions, which tends to be blues based or even noir-ish."

== Track listing ==
1. "Structure à la Malle" (Mats Gustafsson) – 13:37
2. "Why I Don't Go Back" (Ken Vandemark) – 10:00
3. "Song For Che" (Charlie Haden) – 8:52
4. "Unknown Title" (Ken Vandermark) – 8:25
5. "Albumblatt Again" (AALY Trio/Vandermark) – 1:46
6. "Ghosts / Spirits" (Albert Ayler) – 11:52

== Personnel ==
- Mats Gustafsson - tenor saxophone, baritone saxophone
- Ken Vandermark - tenor saxophone, clarinet, bass clarinet
- Peter Janson - bass
- Kjell Nordeson - drums, percussion
