= Hal on Earth =

Studio album by Hal Russell NRG Ensemble
- Released: 1995
- Recorded: November 25 & 26, 1989 at River North Recorders, Chicago, IL.
- Genre: Jazz
- Length: 57:41
- Label: Abduction; ABDT005

Hal Russell chronology
Conserving NRG (1984)	Hal on Earth (1995)	The Finnish/Swiss Tour (1991)

Hal on Earth is an album by American avant-garde jazz composer, bandleader, and multi-instrumentalist Hal Russell recorded in 1989 which was originally released on cassette and released on CD on the Abduction label in 1995.

== Reception ==
Professional ratings
Review scores
Source	Rating
Allmusic	4/5 stars

The Allmusic review awarded the album 4 stars stating "the band was at a peak during this time, and this album showcases everything that made it such a singular group. From the inspired, one-upping interplay between Russell and fellow saxophonist Mars Williams to the manic pacing and daffy sense of humor (often evident in Russell's screwball theme melodies), this album makes it clear that the group was truly enjoying itself as it played".

== Track listing ==
All compositions by Hal Russell except as indicated

1. "Raining Violets" (Brian Sandstrom) - 4:25
2. "Autumn Squeeze" (Kent Kessler) - 5:14
3. "Calling All Mothers" - 2:39
4. "Ode to Monica Chavez" - 2:56
5. "Monica's Having a Baby" - 4:43
6. "Stay Cinderella" - 3:40
7. "Dance of the Spider People" (Mars Williams) - 4:26
8. "Hal on Earth" (Steve Hunt) - 8:56
9. "Lunceford" - 4:12
10. "Hal the Weenie" - 7:29
11. "Temporarily" (Hunt) - 8:58

== Personnel ==
- Hal Russell - tenor saxophone, soprano saxophone, trumpet, marimba
- Mars Williams - tenor saxophone, soprano saxophone, didgeridoo
- Brian Sandstrom - bass, trumpet, guitar
- Kent Kessler - bass, kalimba, didgeridoo
- Steve Hunt -- drums, vibraphone, didgeridoo
