= Here's the Deal (album) =

2000 studio album by Liquid Soul

Studio album by Liquid Soul
- Recorded: March 14, 2000
- Genre: Acid jazz
- Length: 45:41
- Label: Shanachie

Professional ratings
Review scores
Source	Rating
AllMusic	3/5 stars

Here's the Deal is an album by Liquid Soul, released in 2000. It was nominated for a Grammy Award for Best Contemporary Jazz Album.

== Track listing ==
1. "Sure Fire One" – 4:27
2. "The Diz" – 3:17
3. "Stop By Monie's" – 3:54
4. "Everybody's Got One" – 3:55
5. "Show Me" – 2:53
6. "Sex Tablet" – 3:22
7. "All Blues" – 6:13
8. "Sweet Pea" – 3:44
9. "Donkey Punch" – 3:41
10. "Dysfunction" – 4:46
11. "Rocket Scientist" – 2:07
12. "Spam Sucker" – 3:22

== Personnel ==
- Ajax – Turntables
- Chris "Hambone" Cameron – Keyboards
- Newt Cole - Percussion
- Dirty MF - Rap (Track 5)
- Ron Haynes – Trumpet, Flugelhorn
- John Janowiak – Trombone
- Dan Leali – Bass, Drums
- Scott Beddia - Drums
- Brian "MCB" Quarles - Rap (Track 1)
- Tommy Sanchez – Guitar
- Ricky Showalter – Bass
- Simone - Vocals (Tracks 3 & 10)
- Mars Williams – Alto, Soprano, Sax (Alto), Sax (Soprano), Sax (Tenor), Flute (Wood), Tenor (Vocal), Sax (Sopranino), Toy Instruments, Wood Flute

== Production ==
- Rick Barnes – Engineer, Mixing
- Chris Bauer – Assistant
- Jeff Hillman – Mastering
- Mike Park – Mixing
- Slavic Livins – Mixing
- Timothy Powell – Engineer, Live Recording
- Brent Smith – Book
- Michael Ways – Assistant
- David Yow – Design
