= Saga of the Outlaws =

Live album by Charles Tyler
- Released: 1978
- Recorded: May 20, 1976
- Venues: Studio Rivbea, New York City
- Genre: Free jazz
- Length: 36:50
- Labels: Nessa Records n-16
- Producers: Chuck Nessa, Michael Cuscuna

Charles Tyler chronology
Live in Europe: Jazz Festival Umea (1977)	Saga of the Outlaws (1978)	Sixty Minute Man (1980)

Saga of the Outlaws (subtitled "Ride of the Marauders: a polyphonic sonic tale of the old & new West") is a live album by saxophonist Charles Tyler. It was recorded on May 20, 1976, at Studio Rivbea in New York City, and was released in 1978 by Nessa Records. On the album, Tyler is joined by trumpeter Earl Cross, bassists Ronnie Boykins and John Ore, and drummer Steve Reid.

== Reception ==
Professional ratings
Review scores
Source	Rating
AllMusic	4.5/5 stars

In a review for AllMusic, Michael G. Nastos called the album "one of the quintessential epic pieces of free improvisation in history, a 37-minute, one-piece of pure emotion and depth of spirit," as well as "Charles Tyler's magnum opus, historically one of the most definitive free jazz statements of the '70s." He wrote: "Tyler and his extraordinary, vanguard quintet power their way through free bop with an edge that reflects a gunslinger's cool and vicious mentality, while allowing a shoot-'em-up feeding frenzy of wailing discourse that incorporates plenty of harmonic depth and counterpointed interworkings."

The authors of The Penguin Guide to Jazz Recordings included the album in their 2010 edition The History of the Music in the 1001 Best Albums, commenting: "the energies flow back and forth between Tyler and Cross, with Reid... doing much of the supportive work. The basses'... deep rumble is always redolent of marching feet and galloping hooves and helps give the performance its sense of unstoppable impetus."

Clifford Allen of All About Jazz remarked: "The rhythm section is superb, with Reid a tremendously telepathic player... Coupling him with the rock-solid anchors of Boykins and Ore... allows for a formidable and kaleidoscopic approach to rhythm that is nevertheless locked in forward motion."

Writing for Point of Departure, Ed Hazell stated that the album "is riveting from its opening moments. Every aspect of Tyler's music is at its absolute peak and this is perhaps Tyler's finest moment on record."

Author John Litweiler called the album a "tour de force," noting that it "provides the logical sequel to Ornette Coleman's 'Ramblin' of 1959," and stating that it "is also a folktale, but this one shows the dissolution of faith that motivates 'Ramblin'; the two works heard in order summarize America's frontier story."

In an article for The Hum, Bradford Bailey described the album as a "thrill in listening from top to bottom," and wrote: "I can say with certain surety... that I still haven't figured it out. It puts you out of your depth, just were I want to be. One of the unsung greats... an absolute must."

== Track listing ==
Composed by Charles Tyler. Track timings not provided.

1. "Chapter One"
2. "Chapter Two"

== Personnel ==
- Charles Tyler – alto saxophone
- Earl Cross – trumpet
- Ronnie Boykins – bass (right channel)
- John Ore – bass (left channel)
- Steve Reid – drums
