= Albert's Lullaby =

Studio album by Hal Russell
- Released: 2000
- Recorded: October 24, 1991 – February 15, 1992
- Genre: Jazz
- Length: 73:41
- Label: Southport; S-SSD 0077
- Producer: Michael Staron - See liner notes - Southport S-SSD 0077

Hal Russell chronology
The Finnish/Swiss Tour (1991)	Albert's Lullaby (2000)	Naked Colours (1991)

Albert's Lullaby is the first solo album by American avant-garde bassist, jazz composer, bandleader, producer; Michael Staron which in essence documented his trio collaboration with American avant-garde jazz composer, bandleader, and multi-instrumentalist Hal Russell recorded in 1991 and 1992 and released posthumously on the part of Mr. Russell on the Southport label in 2000.

== Reception ==
Professional ratings
Review scores
Source	Rating
AllMusic	3/5 stars
All About Jazz	5/5 stars
Jazz Review	5/5 stars

The AllMusic review by Michael G. Nas states, "Staron's major role in these collective improvisations cannot be overlooked, he is an equal partner firing up Russell's highly spontaneous notions." Harvey Pekar on JazzTimes observed, "“Ghosts” contains Staron's unaccompanied arco and pizzicato work, on which he employs electronic and percussive effects and extended techniques. He's a versatile, forward looking and accomplished performer." . On All About Jazz Glenn Astarita enthused "Albert’s Lullaby is a remarkable portraiture of an artist who most assuredly would be blazing new musical trails if not for his untimely death... Strongly recommended". Jazz Review's Lee Prosser wrote "Albert's Lullaby is free jazz genius and improvisation at its finest... This is a fine example of when all goes right with free jazz in the hands of gifted performers, who, together, share a creative vision with the listening audience".

== Track listing ==
All compositions by Hal Russell, Bradley Parker-Sparrow and Mike Staron except as indicated

1. "Edge of Night (Soap Opera Theme)" - 6:01
2. "Albert's Lullaby" (Mike Staron) - 3:06
3. "Vibrations" (Albert Ayler) - 5:29
4. "Kyrie and Agnus Dei" (Staron) - 6:51
5. "Who's There?" - 25:19
6. "Ghosts" (Ayler) - 3:53
7. "Aural" - 14:47
8. "W" (Staron) - 6:58
9. "To Groove" - 1:17

== Personnel ==
- Hal Russell - tenor saxophone, trumpet
- Michael Staron - bass
- Bradley Parker-Sparrow - piano
- Rick Shandling - drums
