= Naked Colours =

Live album by Hal Russell-Joel Futterman Quartet
- Released: 1994
- Recorded: December 17, 1991 at the Franz Club in Berlin
- Genre: Jazz
- Length: 65:09
- Label: Silkheart; SHCD135
- Producer: Philip R. Egert

Hal Russell chronology
Albert's Lullaby (1991)	Naked Colours (1994)	Hal's Bells (1992)

Naked Colours is a live album by American avant-garde jazz composer, bandleader, and multi-instrumentalist Hal Russell and pianist Joel Futterman recorded in 1991 and released on the Silkheart label in 1994.

== Reception ==
The Allmusic review awarded the album 4 stars stating "This is a mighty date with plenty for free jazz fans to celebrate".

Professional ratings
Review scores
Source	Rating
Allmusic	4/5 stars

== Track listing ==
All compositions by Joel Futterman

1. "Part 1: 278,000 Shades" - 19:31
2. "Part 2: Solid Colours" - 21:56
3. "Part 3: Naked Colours" - 23:43

== Personnel ==
- Hal Russell - tenor saxophone, soprano saxophone, trumpet
- Joel Futterman - piano, recorder
- Jay Oliver - bass
- Robert Adkins - drums
