= Stumble (album) =

Live album by AALY Trio + Ken Vandermark
- Released: 1998
- Recorded: January 17, 1998
- Venue: Unity Temple, Oak Park, Illinois
- Genre: Jazz
- Length: 57:56
- Label: Wobbly Rail

Ken Vandermark chronology
Target or Flag (1998)	Stumble (1998)	Deep Telling (1999)

Stumble is the second album by the AALY Trio + Ken Vandermark, which was recorded live at Chicago's Unity Temple in 1998 and released on Wobbly Rail, a short-lived imprint started by Merge Records/Superchunk principal Mac McCaughan. AALY Trio is a Swedish free jazz band led by saxophonist Mats Gustafsson. Originally just a guest, Vandermark became a full member of the group.

== Reception ==
Professional ratings
Review scores
Source	Rating
AllMusic	4/5 stars
The Penguin Guide to Jazz	3/4 stars

In her review for AllMusic, Joslyn Layne states "These numbers are firmly entrenched in blues roots, carrying on a wailing, at times plaintive, blues spirit with conviction."

The Penguin Guide to Jazz notes that "Vandermark and Gustafsson are formidably like-minded, at least in the way they want the band to make its impression, and the sound of the quartet in full flight has a harsh, narcotic edge to it."

The JazzTimes review by Bill Shoemaker states "While there is plenty of wide-open blowing space for the two saxophonists (Vandermark also plays a good amount of pungent clarinets), and the flexible, fluent Janson and Nordeson, there is an overarching ensemble cohesion that holds this album together."

== Track listing ==
1. "Stumble" (Ken Vandermark) – 11:52
2. "Umeå" (Peter Janson) – 11:28
3. "Hommage à Lillen" (Mats Gustafsson / Kjell Nordeson) – 6:24
4. "Song For Che" (Charlie Haden) – 14:29
5. "Why I Don't Go Back" (Ken Vandermark) – 13:40

== Personnel ==
- Mats Gustafsson - tenor sax, fluteophone, flute
- Peter Janson - bass
- Kjell Nordeson - drums
- Ken Vandermark - tenor sax, clarinet, bass clarinet
