= Target or Flag =

Studio album by The Vandermark 5
- Released: 1998
- Recorded: October 25 & 26, 1997
- Studio: Airwave, Chicago
- Genre: Jazz
- Length: 65:30
- Label: Atavistic

Ken Vandermark chronology
Hidden in the Stomach (1998)	Target or Flag (1998)	Stumble (1998)

Target or Flag is an album by the American jazz reedist Ken Vandermark, recorded in 1997 and released on Atavistic. It was the second recording of the Vandermark 5, which includes Mars Williams on reeds, Jeb Bishop on trombone and guitar, Kent Kessler on bass and Tim Mulvenna on drums.

== Reception ==
Professional ratings
Review scores
Source	Rating
AllMusic	3/5 stars
DownBeat	3.5/5 stars
The Penguin Guide to Jazz	3.5/4 stars

In his review for AllMusic, Jason Ankeny states: "Vandermark possesses both a vast sonic range and impressive tonal strength, and backed by ace Chicago area players like Mars Williams and Kent Kessler, his most innovative ideas are executed to their fullest."

The Penguin Guide to Jazz notes that some dedications "betray his affection for the urbane precision of prime West Coast jazz, and his own pieces make the point of following some of the precepts (counterpoint, tonal contrast) which that school lived by."

The DownBeat review by Aaron Cohen states that "Vandermark knows the value of a working band, and the unit on this dics is the most cohesive that he's led... Target or Flag shows that while Vandermark's saxophone aerodynamics brought him an audience initially, it's his writing and bandleading skills that will build his lasting impact."

Target or Flag won the Cadence Magazine Readers' Poll as the best album of 1998.

== Track listing ==
All compositions by Ken Vandermark

1. "Sucker Punch" – 7:14
2. "Attempted, Not Known" – 11:19
3. "The Start of Something" – 8:07
4. "Super Opaque" – 8:55
5. "Last Call" – 7:58
6. "New Luggage" – 6:31
7. "8K" – 6:41
8. "Fever Dream" – 8:45

== Personnel ==
- Ken Vandermark – clarinets, tenor sax
- Mars Williams – saxophones
- Jeb Bishop – trombone, guitar
- Kent Kessler – bass
- Tim Mulvenna – drums
