= The Finnish/Swiss Tour =

Live album by the Hal Russell NRG Ensemble
- Released: October 1, 1991
- Recorded: November 1990
- Venue: Tampere Jazz Happening; Internationales Jazz Festival, Zürich
- Genre: Free improvisation, free jazz
- Length: 1:02:01
- Label: ECM; ECM 1455
- Producer: Steve Lake

Hal Russell NRG Ensemble chronology
Hal on Earth (1989)	The Finnish/Swiss Tour (1991)	Albert's Lullaby (1991)

The Finnish/Swiss Tour is a live album by the Hal Russell NRG Ensemble recorded in November 1991 at Tampere Jazz Happening in Finland and the Internationales Jazz Festival in Switzerland and released on ECM October the following year. The quintet features saxophonist Mars Williams and rhythm section Brian Sandstrom, Kent Kessler and Steve Hunt.

== Reception ==
Professional ratings
Review scores
Source	Rating
AllMusic	4.5/5 stars

The AllMusic review awarded the album 4½ stars stating "This is an extraordinary record, full of fire, reckless abandon, and thrilling playing from Russell, obviously, but also from his great band."

JazzTimes' Marc Masters wrote, "The deliriously happy sound of The Finnish/Swiss Tour is equally worthy of reverent veneration and ecstatic celebration."

== Track listing ==
All tracks are written by Hal Russell.

No.	Title	Writer(s)	Length
1.	"Monica's Having a Baby"		5:58
2.	"Aila/35 Basic"		7:17
3.	"Temporarily"	Steve Hunt	9:38
4.	"Raining Violets"	Brian Sandstrom	5:03
5.	"For Mc"		3:27
6.	"Dance of the Spider People"	Mars Williams	4:22
7.	"Ten Letters of Love"		4:51
8.	"Hal the Weenie"		7:33
9.	"Linda's Rock Vamp"		4:04
10.	"Mars Theme"	Russell; Williams	9:48
Total length:			1:02:01

== Personnel ==
=== Hal Russell NRG Ensemble ===
- Hal Russell – tenor saxophone, soprano saxophone, trumpet, vibraphone, drums
- Mars Williams – tenor saxophone, soprano saxophone, didgeridoo
- Brian Sandstrom – bass, trumpet, guitar
- Kent Kessler – bass, bass guitar, didgeridoo
- Steve Hunt – drums, vibraphone, didgeridoo
