= Eastern Man Alone =

Studio album by Charles Tyler
- Released: 1967
- Recorded: January 2, 1967
- Studio: Feature's Studio, Indianapolis
- Genre: Jazz
- Length: 48:22
- Label: ESP-Disk

Charles Tyler chronology
Charles Tyler Ensemble (1966)	Eastern Man Alone (1967)	Voyage from Jericho (1974)

Eastern Man Alone is the second album by American jazz saxophonist Charles Tyler, which was recorded in 1967 and released on ESP-Disk.

== Background ==
After recording his debut album, Tyler returned to Indianapolis to enroll at Indiana University, where he stayed until 1968. He studied primarily with David Baker, a trombonist-turned-cellist. During his studies, Tyler waxed Eastern Man Alone. In addition to Tyler's alto and Baker's cello, the instrumentation consist of bassists Brent McKesson and Kent Brinkley on three Tyler originals and Baker's "Le-Roi", also recorded on the 1961 album Together! with the Philly Joe Jones-Elvin Jones Ensemble. "Cha-Lacy's Out East" revisits a theme from his first album.

== Reception ==
Professional ratings
Review scores
Source	Rating
AllMusic	3.5/5 stars
The Penguin Guide to Jazz Recordings	3/4 stars

In his review for AllMusic, Scott Yanow states "This is a worthy effort that is innovative in its own way although not recommended to listeners who feel that bebop is 'modern jazz'." The JazzTimes review by Lyn Horton claims "His music is seminal, even more so it seems than either Coltrane’s and Coleman’s was, because it is downright raw."

== Track listing ==
All compositions by Charles Tyler except as indicated

1. "Cha-Lacy's Out East" – 12:24
2. "Man Alone" – 12:02
3. "Le-Roi" (David Baker) – 13:00
4. "Eastern" – 10:56

== Personnel ==
- Charles Tyler – alto sax
- David Baker – cello
- Kent Brinkley – bass
- Brent McKesson – bass
