= Aida (musical) =

2000 musical by Elton John and Tim Rice

- Logo from the Broadway production
- Music: Elton John
- Lyrics: Tim Rice
- Book: Linda Woolverton; Robert Falls; David Henry Hwang
- Basis: Aida by Giuseppe Verdi; Antonio Ghislanzoni
- Productions: 1998 Atlanta; 1999 Chicago; 2000 Broadway; 2002 US Tour
- Awards: Tony Award for Best Original Score; Grammy Award for Best Musical Show Album

Aida (also known as Elton John and Tim Rice's Aida) is a musical with music by Elton John, lyrics by Tim Rice, and a book by Linda Woolverton, Robert Falls, and David Henry Hwang. It is based on the opera of the same name written by Antonio Ghislanzoni with music by Giuseppe Verdi. The musical was originally produced by Hyperion Theatricals.

Aida premiered on Broadway on March 23, 2000, running for 1,852 performances until September 5, 2004. It was nominated for five Tony Awards and won four, including Best Original Score. It was also named by Time as one of the top ten theatre productions of the year.

The original Broadway cast recording won the Grammy Award for Best Musical Show Album. A song from the show, "Written in the Stars", recorded by Elton John and LeAnn Rimes, reached No. 2 in the Billboard US adult contemporary music chart.

== Background ==
The show is based on Giuseppe Verdi's Italian-language opera of the same name, the libretto of which was written by Antonio Ghislanzoni. The musical originated from a children's storybook version of Verdi's opera written by the soprano Leontyne Price. The book featured illustrations by Leo and Diane Dillon. In 1994 the book rights were acquired by the Walt Disney Company for a proposed animated feature film. However, Elton John chose not to pursue another animated project after The Lion King, so Disney executives suggested a Broadway adaptation instead. Despite his opinion that "opera people can be very elitist", John, along with Tim Rice, immediately signed on.

== Synopsis ==
Act 1

In the Egyptian wing of a modern museum, a man and a woman touring the exhibit catch each other's eyes. A statue of Amneris, a female Pharaoh, comes to life ("Every Story Is a Love Story") and transports them to Ancient Egypt, where Radames, captain of the Egyptian army, and his men are returning from an expedition through the land of Egypt's long-time enemy, Nubia ("Fortune Favors the Brave"). When his soldiers capture a group of Nubian women, he is captivated by one of the women, Aida, who tries to free herself by out-dueling one of his soldiers. Radames orders her to wash his back, but she refuses, saying that although the Egyptians took everything from the Nubians, they will never take their spirit ("The Past Is Another Land"). Radames saves Aida's companions from the copper mines (and certain death) by sending them to the palace groundskeeper instead. He also ensures Aida serves as a handmaiden to his betrothed, Princess Amneris. Radames' father, Chief Minister Zoser, greets his son with news that the Pharaoh is dying, and Radames must prepare to become the next ruler of Egypt ("Another Pyramid"). Unbeknownst to Radames, his father is poisoning the Pharaoh in order to accelerate Radames' ascension to the throne.

Radames' Nubian servant, Mereb, is a young man who has learned the tricks of survival in Egypt. While delivering Aida to the princess, Mereb recognizes her as the daughter of the Nubian king under whom he had served during his days in Nubia. She commands him to keep her identity a secret, lest the Egyptians kill her ("How I Know You"). Presented to Amneris, Aida is liked immediately, and she perceives that the Princess' love of fashion only serves as a mask of her insecurities ("My Strongest Suit"). At a banquet, Amneris and Radames learn from the Pharaoh that they are to marry in seven days, leaving the captain distraught that his days as an explorer have ended ("Fortune Favors the Brave (Reprise)"). Together, he and Aida share their dreams and regrets ("Enchantment Passing Through").

Later that night, Amneris worries about her father's illness, and finds in Aida someone who understands and encourages her ("My Strongest Suit (Reprise)"). Bursting into his fiancée's chamber, Radames steals a moment with Aida to share his growing attraction to her. Aida is taken by Mereb to the Nubian camp, where she reluctantly submits to her people's pleas to lead them ("Dance of the Robe"). When she implores Radames to help the Nubians, he opens his heart by giving his possessions to them ("Not Me") and declaring his love for Aida ("Elaborate Lives"). Unable to fight her feelings any longer, she falls into his embrace. Their bliss is interrupted by news that Radames' armies have captured Amonasro, king of Nubia and also Aida's father. Unable to comfort her, Radames leaves Aida in distress. Rallying her people, Aida assures them that Nubia will never die ("The Gods Love Nubia").

Act 2

Amneris, Radames, and Aida are entangled in conflicted loyalties and emotions ("A Step Too Far"): Amneris is afraid that Radames's affection for her is waning, Radames worries his love for Aida could end his life as he knows it, and Aida fears she might be a traitor to her people as she loves Radames. Aida and Mereb bribe their way into Amonasro's prison cell, where she is reunited with her father. Mereb hatches a plan to escape with the king during the commotion of Amneris' wedding. To save her father and her nation, Aida must betray the man she loves ("Easy as Life"). Meanwhile, Zoser discovers Radames' affair and warns his son that it could cost him the throne, but Radames no longer shares his father's ambitions ("Like Father, Like Son"). After an emotional bout with his son, Zoser orders his men to find Aida and kill her.

At the Nubian camp, Aida receives a written apology from Radames for the thoughtless way he acted upon hearing of Amonasro's capture ("Radames' Letter") and for his lack of showing affection. When Egyptian soldiers arrive seeking Aida, another Nubian, Nehebka, sacrifices herself so that the princess can live. Now even more determined to leave Radames forever, Aida goes to say good-bye to him over Mereb's objections ("How I Know You (Reprise)"). Radames informs Aida that he is calling off the wedding. Aida knows that this would ruin her father's escape and tells him he must go through with it ("Written in the Stars"). Radames agrees, on condition that she escapes to freedom on a boat he will provide. The heartbroken lovers part, but Amneris has overheard their entire conversation and tries to face the fact that her upcoming marriage is a sham ("I Know the Truth").

News of Amonasro's escape disrupts Amneris' wedding. Radames learns the truth of Aida's identity when he arrives at the docks just as she is about to board his boat with her father. Although he is angry that Aida hid this from him, she says she never lied about loving him. Zoser suddenly appears and attacks, and in the ensuing chaos, Mereb is mortally wounded by Zoser, but Radames makes possible Amonasro's escape by cutting the rope tied to the dock, while Aida stays with Radames and a dying Mereb. Zoser flees, and Mereb dies in the arms of his kind master and beloved princess. Radames and Aida are then arrested for treason. At the ensuing trial, Pharaoh announces Zoser's apprehension and sentences both Aida and Radames to be buried alive. Amneris foreshadows her role as a future Pharaoh by convincing her father to let the lovers die in the same tomb, an act of mercy for two people she has come to love. Facing death, Aida looks to Radames for strength ("Elaborate Lives (Reprise)"). As they are slowly deprived of light and air ("Enchantment Passing Through (Reprise)"), Radames swears he will search through a hundred lifetimes to find her again if he has to.

Back in the contemporary museum, the spirit of Amneris reveals that as she became Pharaoh, "the lovers' deaths gave birth to a reign of peace" between Egypt and Nubia. She watches as the modern man and woman are strangely drawn to each other. They are the reincarnations of Aida and Radames, finding each other in a new beginning ("Every Story is a Love Story (Reprise)").

== Principal roles ==
Aida	Daughter of Amonasro and Princess of Nubia. With her royalty unknown to all except the Nubian slaves, who recognize her as their princess, she is taken into slavery with the rest of Nubia but attracts the attention of Radames. (Mezzo-soprano Belt)
Radames	Captain of the Egyptian army, son of Zoser, and fiancé to Amneris. He is expected to succeed the Egyptian throne after the Pharaoh's death, but finds himself intrigued by a Nubian slave, Aida, instead. (Rock Tenor)
Amneris	Princess of Egypt, daughter of the Pharaoh, and fiancée to Radames. She is renowned by all for her fashionable ways. Aida is given to her as a gift to be her handmaiden, by whom her true nature is seen: Amneris is merely using this fashion-driven identity to hide her own insecurities. (Mezzo-soprano)
Zoser	Chief Minister of Egypt and father of Radames. He highly anticipates his son's succession to the Egyptian throne and does all he can to make it arrive sooner, including poisoning the Pharaoh. (Rock Baritone)
Mereb	A Nubian servant to Radames, who was taken captive by Egyptians as a youth and has served among them ever since. The first to recognize Aida as Princess of Nubia, and the first to tell the other Nubian slaves about it with hopes that she can set them free. (Bari-Tenor)
Nehebka	Nubian slave who speaks to Aida as a representative for the Nubian people. (Mezzo-soprano)
Pharaoh	Father of Amneris and King of Egypt. One of the arrangers of Amneris and Radames's much-delayed wedding, he is secretly being poisoned by Zoser to speed up Radames's succession to the throne.
Amonasro	Father of Aida and King of Nubia. He is taken into slavery by Egyptians after Aida and Radames have fallen in love, and commands Aida to break all ties she has to the Egyptians.

== Principal casts ==
Character	Atlanta (1998)	Broadway (2000)	Tour (2001)	Tour (2006)	The Hague (2023)
Aida	Heather Headley	Heather Headley	Lisa Simone	Marja Harmon	Gaia Aikman
Radames	Hank Stratton	Adam Pascal	Patrick Cassidy	Casey Elliott	Naidjim Severina
Amneris	Sherie Rene Scott	Sherie Rene Scott	Kelli Fournier	Leah Allers	April Darby
Zoser	Rich Hebert	John Hickok	Neal Benari	DJ Rudd	Robin van den Akker
Mereb	Scott Irby-Rannier (as Nekhen)	Damian Perkins	Eric L. Christian	Dane Harrington Joseph	Qshans Thode
Pharaoh	Neal Benari	Daniel Oreskes	Mark LaMura	Michael J. Vergoth	Jermaine Faber
Nehebka	Mary Bentley-LaMar	Schele Williams	Merle Dandridge	Ebony Blake	Terra Luna Urbach
Amonasro	Roger Robinson	Tyrees Allen	Jerald Vincent	Edward C. Smith	Joanne Telesford (as Kandake)

== Productions ==
=== Pre-Broadway: Origins, Atlanta and Chicago ===
Aida was originally conceived for production as an animated musical film by Disney executives, who wanted to do another project with the collaborative team of Sir Elton John and Sir Tim Rice, following the success enjoyed by the animated film The Lion King. It was John's idea to develop the story directly as a musical, and a first reading was presented to Disney executives on April 1, 1996. John also recorded multiple demos of the original songs, which were never released but were widely bootlegged. Early readings featured Lisa Simone (Aida), Hank Stratton (Radames) and Sherie Rene Scott (Amneris). It took 2 1/2 years from first reading to the first full production presentation in September 1998 in Atlanta. One of the many issues was what to call the musical.

Elaborate Lives: The Legend of Aida had its world premiere at the Alliance Theatre in Atlanta, Georgia, where it ran from September 16 to November 8, 1998. The Atlanta production featured Heather Headley (Aida), Hank Stratton (Radames) and Sherie Rene Scott (Amneris). The production featured several songs which were cut from the final production. The original Atlanta staging conceived of the play with a nearly empty set, displaying only a six-ton gold pyramid-shaped set piece in the center. Driven by hydraulic controls, the pyramid's sides and bottom could be turned and rotated to suggest various locations. However, the piece - constructed at a price of nearly $10 million - frequently broke down, and a new production designer was hired for restaging in Chicago. Nothing of the original Atlanta set design remained in the new production.

A new, revised production opened on November 12, 1999, at the Cadillac Palace in Chicago, and ran through January 9, 2000. Aida producers made substantial changes to its team for the Chicago production. From the Atlanta staging, only Headley as Aida and Rene Scott as Amneris remained in principal roles. Ensemble members Raymond Rodriguez, Kenya Massey and Kyra Little remained from the Atlanta staging as well. Adam Pascal joined the cast as Radames, starting with the Chicago run. Robert Falls took over as director in Chicago, replacing Robert Jess Ross, and set designer Bob Crowley replaced Stanley A. Meyer. Also part of the new Chicago team was choreographer Wayne Cilento. The Chicago production featured one number "Our Nation Holds Sway", originally performed near the beginning of both act 1 and act 2, which was cut from the final Broadway production.

During the Chicago run at the Cadillac Theatre, on November 13, 1999, a set mishap during the final moments of the performance injured stars Headley and Pascal. According to an eyewitness report, while the two actors were being conveyed in a suspended boxlike 'tomb' at the climax of the show, the set-piece fell from its support, eight feet above the stage. A subsequent press release from the show's publicist stated that Headley and Pascal sustained minor injuries and were taken to Northwestern Memorial Hospital for examination. Both were released from the hospital a few hours later. From then on, the tomb remained on the ground.

=== Broadway ===
The musical, now titled Elton John and Tim Rice's Aida, premiered on Broadway at the Palace Theatre on March 23, 2000, and closed on September 5, 2004, after 30 previews and 1,852 performances. The run puts it at the 43rd longest run in Broadway history. The Broadway production was directed by Robert Falls and choreographed by Wayne Cilento, with scenery and costume design by Bob Crowley, lighting design by Natasha Katz, and sound design by Steve C. Kennedy. Considered by its producers to be a financial success, Aida on Broadway recovered its investment in 99 weeks, and generated a profit of $12 million.

Heather Headley originated the title role of Aida, and won both the Tony Award and the Drama Desk Award for Best Actress in a Musical in 2000 for her performance; Headley also received broad critical acclaim. Adam Pascal played the role of Radames in both the OBC and closing productions of Aida on Broadway. Sherie René Scott, who was with the project since its first workshop, originated the role of Amneris, and was named the Most Promising Actress in 2000 for her performance (Clarence Derwent Award). The cast also included Tyrees Allen (Amonasro), John Hickok (Zoser), Daniel Oreskes (Pharaoh), Damian Perkins (Mereb), and Schele Williams (Nehebka).

Pop stars, including Deborah Cox, Toni Braxton and Michelle Williams played the title role of Aida during its run on Broadway, as well as Maya Days, Saycon Sengbloh, Lisa Simone and Merle Dandridge. Notable replacements for Radames included Will Chase, Patrick Cassidy, Richard H. Blake, William Robert Gaynor, and Matt Bogart. Notable replacements for Amneris included Idina Menzel, Jessica Hendy, Mandy Gonzalez, Felicia Finley, Taylor Dayne and Lisa Brescia. Notable replacements for Zoser were Micky Dolenz and Donnie Kehr. Notable Replacements for Mereb were J. Marshall Evans and Julian Bass.

=== US national tours ===
Elton John and Tim Rice's Aida had a critically acclaimed US national tour from March 2001 to 2003. The show received eight nominations and won five awards in 2002. including Best Musical, Best Actress (Lisa Simone), and Best Actor (Patrick Cassidy) from the National Broadway Theatre Awards (now called "Touring Broadway Awards"). The national tour also featured Kelli Fournier (Amneris). Notable replacements included Jeremy Kushnier (Radames) and Lisa Brescia (Amneris).

The musical also had a non-equity US national tour during 2006–07 featuring Marja Harmon (Aida), Casey Elliott (Radames), and Leah Allers (Amneris). This production had a revised script by David Henry Hwang authorized by Disney. The new script was considered to be more serious and darker, with much of the shticky and comedic elements removed from Amneris' character especially. "Strongest Suit" was staged as a scene in which Aida helped Amneris choose her outfit for the evening instead of a random fashion show. The scene prior to "Strongest Suit (Reprise)" was revised with Aida teaching Amneris how to thread, adding more a sense of bond between the women and also humbling Amneris in wanting to learn something new and not just 'be a princess.' Introduced to the plot was the revelation that Radames' mother was a prostitute and that Zoser treated her as such, and fought and schemed for Radames to achieve his position of Captain of Pharaoh's armies.

A national tour of Aida was originally planned for 2021, following a run at Paper Mill Playhouse. The revival was to include Schele Williams as director, Camille A. Brown leading choreography, and a revised book by Hwang. However, this production was cancelled, and was planned to be held in Germany in 2022.

=== International productions ===
The first international production of Aida ran in Scheveningen, Netherlands. The show ran from October 10, 2001, to August 3, 2003, and was performed in Dutch. This production featured Chaira Borderslee (Aida), Bastiaan Ragas (Radames) and Antje Monteiro (Amneris). There have been also productions of Aida in Germany, Switzerland, Japan, South Korea, Uruguay, Poland, Singapore, Australia, Philippines, Mexico, Croatia, Peru, Argentina, Estonia, Canada, Panama, Hungary, Brazil, Sweden, Denmark, China, Israel and the Czech Republic. Aida was premiered in New Zealand at St Peter's School (Cambridge) (May 2012, at St Peter's College, Auckland (in 2013) and at Saint Kentigern College, Auckland in (2012). The original Japanese production has re-opened and is currently playing in Osaka, Japan.

Aida has been translated into 16 languages: German, Italian, Japanese, Korean, Dutch, Spanish, Estonian, French, Hungarian, Croatian, Portuguese, Swedish, Danish, Hebrew, Czech and Polish (in 2019).

Aida was due to play in Jerusalem, Israel in January–February 2014 at the Hebrew University of Jerusalem Beit Hillel theatre, directed by Michael Berl.

Aida has been produced twice in Lima, Peru at "Colegio Villa María"'s Trinity Hall. It was first produced in 2005, receiving praise from the Peruvian media. It was staged for a second time in 2015. In both occasions directed by Manuel Ramírez-Gastón, Aida is one of Villa María's critically acclaimed productions of the past ten years.

A 2022 production was originally planned to begin in Germany, but was moved to Scheveningen at the AFAS Circustheater, with Williams' and Hwang's continued involvement, where it will begin April 23, 2023.

Aida has never been staged professionally in London or elsewhere in the UK – home of both its composer and lyricist – although it has been available for amateur licensing since 2011. Its first major performance in the UK was in March 2013 at the ADC Theatre by the Cambridge University Musical Theatre Society. Schele Williams indicated that, following the 2023 run in the Netherlands, Aida would tour "a number of cities", and would perform in the West End.

== Musical numbers ==
Act I

- "Every Story is a Love Story" – Amneris
- "Fortune Favors the Brave" – Radames and the Soldiers
- "The Past is Another Land" – Aida
- "Another Pyramid" – Zoser and the Ministers
- "How I Know You" – Mereb and Aida
- "My Strongest Suit" – Amneris and the Women of the Palace
- "Fortune Favors The Brave (Reprise)" - Radames +
- "Enchantment Passing Through" – Radames and Aida
- "My Strongest Suit" (Reprise) – Amneris and Aida
- "Dance of the Robe" – Aida, Nehebka and the Nubians
- "Not Me" – Radames, Aida, Amneris and Mereb
- "Elaborate Lives" – Radames and Aida
- "The Gods Love Nubia" – Aida, Nehebka, Mereb and the Nubians

Act II

- "A Step Too Far" – Amneris, Radames and Aida
- "Easy as Life" – Aida
- "Like Father, Like Son" – Zoser, Radames and the Ministers
- "Radames' Letter" – Radames
- "How I Know You" (Reprise) – Mereb
- "Written in the Stars" – Radames and Aida
- "I Know the Truth" – Amneris
- "Elaborate Lives" (Reprise) – Aida and Radames
- "Enchantment Passing Through" (Reprise) – Radames and Aida
- "Every Story is a Love Story" (Reprise) – Amneris

+ Not on Broadway Cast Recording

=== Recordings ===
A number of recordings are available for Aida:

- Elton John and Tim Rice's Aida, sometimes known as the "Concept Album", was released in 1999 in advance of the theatrical production, and features Elton John performing songs from the show along with a number of artists, including Janet Jackson, Tina Turner, Shania Twain, Sting, Spice Girls and LeAnn Rimes. It also included Heather Headley and Sherie René Scott, both of whom went on to reprise their roles in the original Broadway production the following year.
- Elton John and Tim Rice's Aida: Original Broadway Cast Recording was released in 2000, and won the Grammy Award for Best Musical Show Album. Since then, it has sold over 500,000 copies and is a certified Gold Album by RIAA.
- 2001 Dutch Cast
- 2004 German Cast
- 2004 Japanese Cast
- 2007 Hungarian Cast

== Musical analysis ==
Elton John's score for Aida is stylistically eclectic. "Another Pyramid" is a modern reggae number; "My Strongest Suit" draws heavily on Motown, "The Gods Love Nubia" draws on gospel. There are numbers, e.g., "Not Me", "Elaborate Lives", "A Step Too Far", "Written in the Stars", that reflect Elton John's pop style. There is also a strong influence of African music, notably in "Dance of the Robe" and "Easy as Life". These styles are used without much attention to historical authenticity; rather, there is a mix of African (mostly West African), Indian and Middle Eastern influences. Probably the nearest stylistic parallel to the work as a whole is to Elton John's The Lion King, another musical with strong emphasis on ethnically diverse stylistic influences.

Among the songs cut from the production after previews and workshops were two songs that made up the final sequence of the play: a reprise of "Fortune Favors The Brave" entitled "The Two Must Die", and then a final death duet for Aida and Radames, entitled "The Messenger". These songs were replaced with reprises of "Elaborate Lives", "Enchantment Passing Through" and "Every Story Is A Love Story".

== Potential film adaptation ==
Leontyne Price's original storybook version of the show had first been acquired by Disney with the intention that it should become an animated film, but it was never made. It was believed for a time that concept art existed for this proposed animated feature. However, the artist of that piece Ben Balistreri has stated that "This was nothing more than a class assignment given out by Frank Terry when I was at Cal Arts back in 1996... Frank brought in a newspaper clipping that Disney and Elton John were going to do an animated musical of Aida and our assignment was to create a line-up of the main characters and give them all Disney style sidekicks."

Following the success of the stage version, Disney began planning a major live-action motion picture adaptation. In July 2007, it was reported that Beyoncé was attached to portray the title role, alongside Christina Aguilera as Amneris. However, no further reports of the adaptation's production have surfaced since.

== Popular culture references ==
In 2020, the song "My Strongest Suit" was covered by Lucy Hale, Ashleigh Murray, Julia Chan and Jonny Beauchamp on the first season of the television series Katy Keene in the episode "Chapter Five: Song for a Winter's Night".

== Awards and nominations ==
Year	Award Ceremony	Category	Nominee	Result
2000	Tony Award	Best Original Score	Elton John and Tim Rice	Won
2000	Tony Award	Best Actress in a Musical	Heather Headley	Won
2000	Tony Award	Best Scenic Design	Bob Crowley	Won
2000	Tony Award	Best Costume Design	Bob Crowley	Nominated
2000	Tony Award	Best Lighting Design	Natasha Katz	Won
2000	Drama Desk Award	Outstanding Actress in a Musical	Heather Headley	Won
2000	Grammy Award	Best Musical Show Album	Elton John and Tim Rice	Won
2000	John Kraaijkamp Musical Award	Best Musical	Walt Disney Theatrical	Won
2000	John Kraaijkamp Musical Award	Best Performance by a Leading Actress	Antje Monteiro	Nominated
2000	John Kraaijkamp Musical Award	Best Performance by a Leading Actor	Bastiaan Ragas	Won
2000	John Kraaijkamp Musical Award	Most Promising Male Talent	Marlon David Henry	Nominated
2000	John Kraaijkamp Musical Award	Award for Best Translation	Martine Bijl	Won
2000	National Broadway Theatre Awards (now called "Touring Broadway Awards")	Best Musical		Won
2000	National Broadway Theatre Awards (now called "Touring Broadway Awards")	Best Score	Elton John and Tim Rice	Nominated
2000	National Broadway Theatre Awards (now called "Touring Broadway Awards")	Best Song in a Musical	"I Know The Truth"	Nominated
2000	National Broadway Theatre Awards (now called "Touring Broadway Awards")	Best Actor in a Musical	Patrick Cassidy	Won
2000	National Broadway Theatre Awards (now called "Touring Broadway Awards")	Best Actress in a Musical	Simone	Nominated
2000	National Broadway Theatre Awards (now called "Touring Broadway Awards")	Best Actress in a Musical	Kelli Fournier	Nominated
2000	National Broadway Theatre Awards (now called "Touring Broadway Awards")	Best Direction	Elton John	Won
2000	National Broadway Theatre Awards (now called "Touring Broadway Awards")	Best Visual Presentation	Bob Crowley (Scenic Design) and Natasha Katz (Lighting)	Won
2000	National Broadway Theatre Awards (now called "Touring Broadway Awards")	Best Costumes	Bob Crowley	Nominated
2000	Clarence Derwent Award	Most Promising Female	Sherie Rene Scott	Won
2000	Outer Critics Circle Awards	Outstanding Actress In A Musical	Heather Headley	Nominated
