= International Front =

Studio album by Ken Vandermark
- Released: 1995
- Recorded: 5 – 6 September 1994
- Studio: PBS, Westwood, Massachusetts
- Genre: Jazz
- Length: 73:17
- Label: Okka Disk
- Producer: Ken Vandermark

Ken Vandermark chronology
Standards (1995)	International Front (1995)	Utility Hitter (1996)

International Front is an album by American jazz reedist Ken Vandermark, which was recorded in 1994 and released on Okka Disk. He leads the Steelwool Trio with longtime partner bassist Kent Kessler and Boston drummer Curt Newton.

== Reception ==
Professional ratings
Review scores
Source	Rating
AllMusic	4/5 stars
The Penguin Guide to Jazz	3.5/4 stars

In her review for AllMusic, Joslyn Layne states "Sections of this album are undeniably out, yet are balanced by other sections that feature these musicians at their straightest."

The Penguin Guide to Jazz says "'The Steelwood Trio, with long-time compadre Kessler in great fettle, is a roughly shod power-trio that finds each man vying for attention: muscular, exhilarating, unrepentant."

== Track listing ==
All compositions by Kent Vandermark

1. "Tough Sledding" – 9:07
2. "Bowling Alley Roughs" – 5:54
3. "Tag" – 13:21
4. "Otherwise" – 5:42
5. "Day Job" – 5:48
6. "Another Orbit" – 10:12
7. "Dime Store Novel" – 6:28
8. "Wrenches" – 5:30
9. "No Sleeves No Service" – 11:15

== Personnel ==
- Ken Vandermark – reeds
- Kent Kessler – bass
- Curt Newton – drums
