= Blow Horn =

Studio album by FJF
- Released: 1997
- Recorded: October 15, 1995
- Studio: Überstudio, Chicago
- Genre: Jazz
- Length: 51:21
- Label: Okka Disk
- Producer: Mats Gustafsson, Ken Vandermark, John Corbett

Ken Vandermark chronology
Hoofbeats of the Snorting Swine (1996)	Blow Horn (1997)	A Meeting in Chicago (1997)

Blow Horn is an album by FJF (Free Jazz Four), a quartet formed by Swedish saxophonist Mats Gustafsson and American reedist Ken Vandermark with the Chicago's NRG Ensemble rhythm section of bassist Kent Kessler and drummer Steve Hunt. It was recorded in 1995 and released on Okka Disk.

== Reception ==
Professional ratings
Review scores
Source	Rating
AllMusic	4/5 stars
The Penguin Guide to Jazz	3/4 stars

In his review for AllMusic, Tim Sheridan states: "This is improvised music with little form, but plenty of invention."

== Track listing ==
All compositions by Gustafsson/Hunt/Kessler/Vandermark except as indicated

1. "Dedication" – 13:36
2. "Blow Horn for Service" – 12:12
3. "Biomass" – 6:06
4. "Structure a la Malle (1st Version)" (Gustafsson) – 14:31
5. "Carry Out" – 4:56

== Personnel ==
- Mats Gustafsson – tenor saxophone, baritone saxophone, French flageolet
- Kent Kessler – bass
- Steve Hunt – drums
- Ken Vandermark – tenor saxophone, bass clarinet
