= Lisa Simone =

American singer, composer and actress (born 1962)

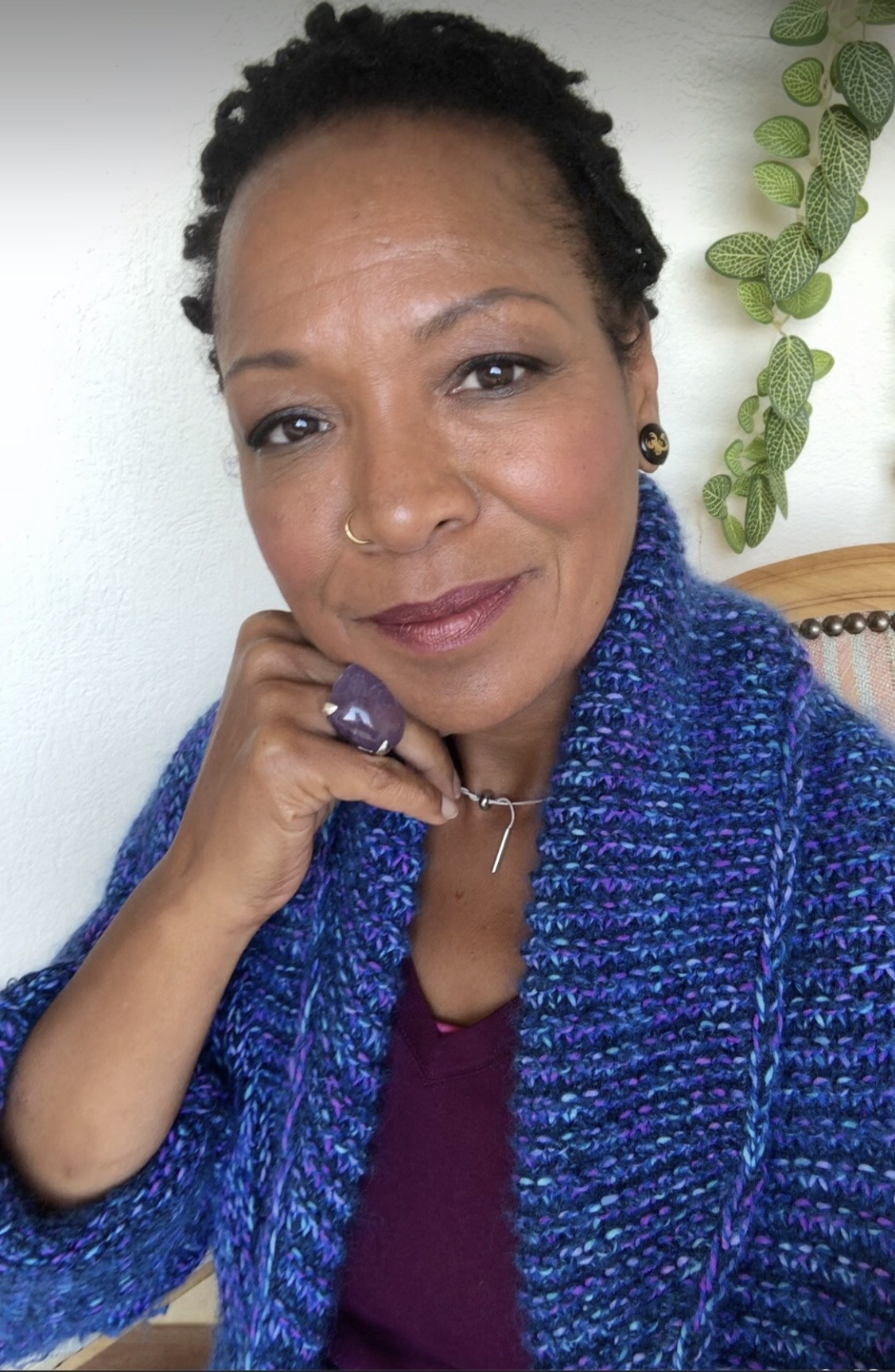
- Simone in 2020

Background information
- Also known as: Simone; Lisa Simone
- Born: Lisa Celeste Stroud; September 12, 1962 (age 64); Mount Vernon, New York, U.S.
- Genres: R&B; neo soul; traditional pop; jazz; folk; acid jazz; Broadway theatre
- Occupations: Singer; songwriter; actress; composer
- Instrument: Vocals
- Years active: 1980–present
- Parent(s): Nina Simone and Andrew Stroud

Lisa Simone Kelly (born Lisa Celeste Stroud; September 12, 1962) is an American singer, composer and actress, known for her work both on Broadway and off-Broadway, in Rent, The Lion King, Aida, and Les Miserables.

She is the only child of musician and civil rights activist Nina Simone from her marriage to police officer Andrew Stroud. She served as the executive producer of the Netflix documentary What Happened, Miss Simone? (2015), which documented the personal life of her family and her mother.

Simone's work as a musician includes the albums Simone on Simone, All is Well, My World, and Live at the Edge.

== Biography ==
Lisa Simone Kelly was born on September 12, 1962, in Mount Vernon, New York, the only daughter of musician and civil rights activist Nina Simone and her second husband Andrew Stroud, a police officer. Growing up, Lisa often lived with relatives and friends due to her mother's busy touring schedule, her parents’ tempestuous marriage, as well as her mother's mental health problems. In the 1970s, she lived with her mother in Switzerland, where she attended the International School of Geneva. Later in life, Simone alleged that her mother was emotionally and physically abusive, driving her to the point of contemplating suicide until finally going to New York to live with her father.

As a young adult, Simone served in the United States Air Force for more than 10 years as an engineering assistant stationed at Davis Monthan in Tucson, Arizona, Osan Air Base in South Korea, and Rhein-Main Air Base in Frankfurt, Germany. She is a veteran of the Gulf War. After being honorably discharged, Simone sang background for various European artists and was part of the Spanish artist Raphael's touring chorus.

Simone's theatrical stage debut was in a national tour of the Andrew Lloyd Webber rock musical Jesus Christ Superstar, as a Soul Sister, Simon, and understudy for Mary. In 1996, she continued her career as a swing and female understudy in the original Broadway production of Rent at which time she also performed the roles of Aida in Disney's Aida and Nala in The Lion King. Later that year, Simone performed the lead role of Mimi Marquez in Rent's first national tour, from November 1996 to April 1998. She was nominated for both a Helen Hayes Award and a Jefferson Award for her performances.

Starting in 1998, Simone took a hiatus from the theatre, during which she toured and recorded two albums with the acid jazz band Liquid Soul as a featured vocalist. Along with the rest of the band, she was nominated for a Grammy Award for their 2000 album Here's the Deal. Simone then returned to the Broadway stage in the title role of the Disney musical Aida. She performed the role from January 29, 2002, until June 15, 2003. She won the National Theatre Award for Best Actress in a Musical—voted on by fans—for her performances on Aida's First National Tour, before returning to Broadway's Palace Theatre. She reprised this role for a short time at The Muny Theater in St. Louis in the summer of 2006. In August 2007, she played Fantine in Les Misérables at The Muny.

Simone has released five solo albums: Simone on Simone, All Is Well, Lisa Simone with Tromsø Big Band Live at the Edge, My World, and In Need of Love.

Simone is married to Robert Kelly. They have a daughter, ReAnna Simone Kelly. Simone has appeared on Psychic Kids, the Larry King Show, and the Tyra Banks Show. Simone is also fluent in French, having been partly raised in Switzerland. She was featured on the France 24 program A l'Affiche on April 5, 2016.

She was inducted as an honorary member of Sigma Gamma Rho on July 24, 2026, at their 61st Biennial Boule in Tampa, Florida.
