= Hal's Bells =

Studio album by Hal Russell
- Released: 1992
- Recorded: May 1992
- Studio: Rainbow Studio; Oslo, Norway
- Genre: Jazz
- Length: 52:58
- Label: ECM; ECM 1484
- Producer: Steve Lake

Hal Russell chronology
Naked Colours (1991)	Hal's Bells (1992)	The Hal Russell Story (1993)

Hal's Bells is a solo album by American jazz multi-instrumentalist and composer Hal Russell recorded in May 1992 and released on ECM later that year.

== Reception ==
The AllMusic review awarded the album 4½ stars stating "Although Russell died soon after recording this, there's no sense of desperation on this record; instead there is pure joy, the silly seriousness that Russell brought to all of his recordings."

Professional ratings
Review scores
Source	Rating
AllMusic	4.5/5 stars

== Track listing ==
All compositions by Hal Russell except as indicated

1. "Buddhi" - 4:13
2. "Millard Mottker" - 6:48
3. "Portrait of Benny" - 4:01
4. "Strangest Kiss" - 5:03
5. "Susanna" - 4:47
6. "Carolina Moon" (John Pennington) - 6:31
7. "Kenny G." - 6:21
8. "I Need You Now" - 4:38
9. "For Free" - 6:33
10. "Moon of Manakoora" (Alfred Newman, Frank Loesser) - 4:03

== Personnel ==
- Hal Russell – tenor saxophone, soprano saxophone, trumpet, musette, vibraphone, drums, bass marimba, congas, gongs, bells, percussion, voice
