= Utility Hitter =

Studio album by Ken Vandermark
- Released: 1996
- Recorded: September 9 & 10, 1995
- Studio: Loose Booty, Chicago
- Genre: Jazz
- Length: 67:12
- Label: Quinnah
- Producer: Ken Vandermark

Ken Vandermark chronology
International Front (1995)	Utility Hitter (1996)	Hoofbeats of the Snorting Swine (1996)

Utility Hitter is an album by American jazz reedist Ken Vandermark, which was recorded in 1995 and released on the Quinnah label. He leads the Barrage Double Trio, composed of one bass-drums-reeds trio (Nate McBride, Curt Newton, Vandermark) from Boston and other (Kent Kessler, Hamid Drake, Mars Williams) from Chicago. The whole band plays six Vandermark compositions, the remaining five tracks are short improvisations: one for each of the trios and three duos.

== Reception ==
Professional ratings
Review scores
Source	Rating
The Penguin Guide to Jazz	4/4 stars
Down Beat	3.5/4 stars

The Penguin Guide to Jazz describes the album as "monumental" and states "The dedications to Mingus, Andrew Hill, Ornette, Cherry and Ayler are marvellous, but so is the revisionist hard-bop-as-raging-fury of their tribute to Griffin and Lockjaw."

The Down Beat review by Aaron Cohen notes that the album "draws on Ornette Coleman's Free Jazz double-group assembly as a blueprint" and claims "It takes considerable nerve to emulate a legendary configuration, and Barrage Double Trio demonstrates that the experiment should be tried more often."

== Track listing ==
All compositions by Kent Vandermark except as indicated

1. "Over and Both" – 5:15
2. "Chicago Trio" (Drake, Kessler, Williams) – 2:39
3. "Agamemnon Sleeps" – 15:46
4. "Bass Duo" (Kessler, McBride) – 3:14
5. "Turn Your Head" – 4:49
6. "Tenor Duo" (Williams, Vandermark) – 1:56
7. "There Is No Reason" – 8:51
8. "Drum Duo" (McBride, Newton) – 3:31
9. "East River Suite" – 12:40
10. "Boston Trio" (McBride, Newton, Vandermark) – 2:19
11. "Polarity" – 6:12

== Personnel ==
- Nate McBride – acoustic bass, electric bass
- Hamid Drake – trap set, hand drums
- Curt Newton – trap set, percussion
- Ken Vandermark – tenor saxophone, B-flat clarinet, bass clarinet
- Kent Kessler – acoustic bass
- Mars Williams – tenor saxophone, alto saxophone, soprano saxophone, B-flat clarinet
