= Generation (Hal Russell album) =

Studio album by Hal Russell NRG Ensemble
- Released: 1982
- Recorded: September 9, 1982; Solid Sound Studios
- Genre: Jazz
- Length: 53:27
- Label: Nessa; N 25
- Producer: Chuck Nessa

Hal Russell chronology
Eftsoons (1984)	Generation (1982)	Conserving NRG (1984)

Generation is an album by American avant-garde jazz composer, bandleader, and multi-instrumentalist Hal Russell's NRG Ensemble with Charles Tyler, recorded in 1982 and originally released on the Nessa label. It was reissued in 2014 with two bonus tracks previously unreleased from an early audition recording made when the band was a pre-Sandstrom quartet.

== Reception ==
Professional ratings
Review scores
Source	Rating
Allmusic	4.5/5 stars

The Allmusic review awarded the album 4½ stars, stating, "As on any NRG Ensemble recording, there are no dull moments, but this one is supplanted by the joy, wisdom, and immaculate sense of the unknown that Charles Tyler brought to the date".

== Track listing ==
All compositions by Hal Russell except as indicated

1. "Sinus Up" (Brian Sandstrom) - 3:47
2. "Poodle Cut" (Steve Hunt) - 12:50
3. "Sponge" - 10:42
4. "Tatwas" - 3:20
5. "Cascade" - 19:07
6. "Generation" (Curt Bley) - 3:41

Bonus tracks (2014 CD reissue)

7. "This Fence is a Loving Machine" - 4:26
8. "Uncontrollable Rages" - 13:55

Recorded January 10, 1981

== Personnel ==
- Hal Russell - tenor saxophone, alto saxophone, cornet, drums
- Charles Tyler - baritone saxophone, alto saxophone, clarinet (tracks 2–5)
- Chuck Burdelik - tenor saxophone, alto saxophone, clarinet
- Brian Sandstrom - trumpet, electric guitar, bass
- Curt Bley - bass, electric bass
- Steve Hunt - drums, vibraphone
