= Eftsoons =

Studio album by Hal Russell & Mars Williams
- Released: 1984
- Recorded: August 21, 1981 at Acme Studios, Chicago
- Genre: Jazz
- Length: 53:27
- Labels: Nessa; N 24
- Producer: Chuck Nessa

Hal Russell chronology
NRG Ensemble (1981)	Eftsoons (1984)	Generation (1982)

Mars Williams chronology
Eftsoons (1981)	Hoofbeats of the Snorting Swine (1996)

Eftsoons is an album by American avant-garde jazz composer, bandleader, and multi-instrumentalist Hal Russell with Mars Williams recorded in 1981 and originally released on the Nessa label.

== Reception ==
Professional ratings
Review scores
Source	Rating
Allmusic	3/5 stars

The Allmusic review awarded the album three stars.

== Track listing ==
All compositions by Hal Russell and Mars Williams

1. "Carnal Concupiscence" - 3:24
2. "Is This Virginia?" - 4:49
3. "A Sync/Sync Stat Mux Prolithux" - 4:52
4. "Odoriferous Flambeaus of the Paranymphs" - 8:25
5. "N, SSS, EEE <RETURN>" - 7:05
6. "Eftsoons" - 8:43
7. "Noise Commands: Blast 1" - 5:06

== Personnel ==
- Hal Russell - C melody saxophone, cornet, vibraphone, drums, toy horns and much else
- Mars Williams - tenor saxophone, slide whistle bells, newspapers and much else
