= Conserving NRG =

Studio album by Hal Russell NRG Ensemble
- Released: 1984
- Recorded: March 15 & 16, 1984 at WFMT Studios, Chicago, IL.
- Genre: Jazz
- Label: Principally Jazz; PJP 02
- Producer: Linda E. Prince

Hal Russell chronology
Generation (1982)	Conserving NRG (1984)	Hal on Earth (1989)

Conserving NRG is an album by American avant-garde jazz composer, bandleader, and multi-instrumentalist Hal Russell recorded in 1984 and released on the Principally Jazz label.

== Reception ==
Professional ratings
Review scores
Source	Rating
AllMusic	4.5/5 stars

The AllMusic review by Scott Yanow states, "Russell explores seven diverse and consistently colorful group originals that are more accessible than expected. This highly expressive music (which has plenty of variety) is worth checking out".

== Track listing ==
All compositions by Hal Russell except as indicated

1. "Rusty Nails" (Curt Bley) - 6:46
2. "Blue Over You" - 5:44
3. "OJN" - 5:32
4. "Pontiac" (Brian Sandstrom) - 4:09
5. "Sine Die" (Sandstrom) - 3:08
6. "Overbite" (Steve Hunt) - 9:08
7. "Song Singing to You" - 10:36
8. "Swing Sting" - 11:29 Bonus track on CD
9. "Linda's Rock Vamp" - 3:28 Bonus track on CD

== Personnel ==
- Hal Russell - tenor saxophone, cornet, vibraphone, drums, percussion
- Chuck Burdelik - tenor saxophone, alto saxophone, percussion
- Brian Sandstrom - trumpet, guitar, bass, percussion
- Curt Bley - bass
- Steve Hunt—drums, vibraphone, percussion
