= Elixir (Hal Russell album) =

Live album by Hal Russell's Chemical Feast
- Released: 2001
- Recorded: March 5, 1979 at Elixir Gallery, Chicago
- Genre: Jazz
- Length: 69:54
- Label: Atavistic; ALP203CD
- Producer: John Corbett

Hal Russell chronology
Elixir (2001)	NRG Ensemble (1981)

Elixir is a live album by American avant-garde jazz composer, bandleader, and multi-instrumentalist Hal Russell's Chemical Feast recorded in Chicago in 1979 and released posthumously on the Atavistic label in 2001.

== Reception ==
Professional ratings
Review scores
Source	Rating
Allmusic	4/5 stars

The Allmusic review awarded the album 4 stars stating "This CD possesses historical value as a rare document of the non-AACM Chicago avant-garde scene prior to its 1990s resurgence but the real reason to get it is that it just plain smokes". On All About Jazz Derek Taylor noted "The recording isn’t going to win any laurels for clean fidelity, but its very existence precludes any finger waving at its shortcomings. Russell’s discography is sparse enough as it currently stands. The prospect of future releases like this one is made all the more appealing considering he’s no longer with us and the source of the reservoir is his own personal stash".

== Track listing ==
All compositions by Hal Russell except as indicated

1. "Broadway Blues" (Ornette Coleman) - 15:57
2. "Manas" - 6:15
3. "Four Free" - 10:28
4. "Four Winds" (Dave Holland) - 15:27
5. "Kahoutek" (Mars Williams) - 7:20
6. "March of the Cellulite Goddesses" (Williams) - 7:25
7. "Airborne" (Coleman) - 7:02

== Personnel ==
- Hal Russell - tenor saxophone, zither, drums
- Mars Williams, Spider Middleman - saxophones
- Russ Ditusa - bass
- George Southgate - vibraphone, drums
