= Charles Tyler Ensemble =

Studio album by Charles Tyler
- Released: 1966
- Recorded: February 4, 1966; New York City, U.S.
- Genre: Jazz
- Length: 34:01
- Label: ESP-Disk

Charles Tyler chronology
Charles Tyler Ensemble (1966)	Eastern Man Alone (1967)

Charles Tyler Ensemble is the debut album by American jazz saxophonist Charles Tyler, which was recorded in 1966 in New York City and released on ESP-Disk.

== Background ==
By 1965, Tyler was added as the third horn in Albert Ayler's band. That association is documented by Bells and Spirits Rejoice. The following year, Bernard Stollman offered Tyler the opportunity to record his first album as leader on ESP-Disk. The band features an unusual instrumentation for its time, using cellist Joel Freedman and bassist Henry Grimes from Albert Ayler's group along with Charles Moffett on mallet instruments and a young Ronald Jackson (later known as Ronald Shannon Jackson) on drums. Although primarily known as a baritone saxophone player, Tyler plays alto saxophone on four original compositions.

== Reception ==
Professional ratings
Review scores
Source	Rating
AllMusic	4/5 stars
The Penguin Guide to Jazz Recordings	3/4 stars

In his review for AllMusic, Michael G. Nastos wrote "With this vivacious music that stretches time parameters and harmonic envelopes, Tyler and his crew bend whatever malleable shapes they can, while burning down the traditional jazz house and still paying homage to bebop."

The JazzTimes review by Lyn Horton notes "Distinguishing Tyler, from Ayler, is the sourness of his flourishes. He avoids lengthy arpeggios, but tends towards eerie high tension phrases, vibratos and nearly fully-realized melodies."

The All About Jazz review by Raul D'Gama Rose says that "Unlike many records of the mid-1960s, it burns with a quiet blue flame, eschewing the intellectual posturing that characterized much new music in the avant-garde era."

== Track listing ==
All compositions by Charles Tyler

1. "Strange Uhuru" – 10:01
2. "Lacy's Out East" – 6:38
3. "Three Spirits" – 8:07
4. "Black Mysticism" – 9:15

== Personnel ==
- Joel Freedman – cello
- Henry Grimes – bass
- Ronald Jackson – drums
- Charles Moffett – orchestra vibes
- Charles Tyler – alto sax
