= Sioux Falls Jazz and Blues Festival =

Coordinates: 43.505185°N 96.737357°W

The Sioux Falls Jazz and Blues Festival (more commonly JazzFest) was an annual three-day outdoor musical event, featuring two stages and free admission to the public. It was one of the largest free music festivals in its region and was held annually at Yankton Trail Park in Sioux Falls, South Dakota during the third weekend of July. In 2019, it was announced the festival would be cancelled for a need to be "refreshed and retooled."

The festival was created in 1991 by Chris Carlsen, Ann McDowell, Nettie Myers, Sharon Reynolds, Michael Turner, Michael Williamson, Sandy Silverberg and Deb McIntyre.

The SF Jazz and Blues Society (the hosts of the event) dissolved in 2023.
