= The Hal Russell Story =

Studio album by Hal Russell NRG Ensemble
- Released: 1993
- Recorded: July 1992
- Studios: Hardstudios; Winterthur, Switzerland
- Genre: Jazz
- Length: 73:13
- Labels: ECM; ECM 1498
- Producer: Steve Lake

Hal Russell chronology
| Hal's Bells (1992) | The Hal Russell Story (1993) |

The Hal Russell Story is the final album by the Hal Russell NRG Ensemble, recorded in Switzerland in July 1992 and released on ECM the following year—Russell's final recording before his death, five weeks later.

== Reception ==
Professional ratings
Review scores
| Source | Rating |
|---|---|
| AllMusic | 4/5 stars |
| DownBeat | 5/5 stars |

The AllMusic review awarded the album 4 stars stating "It would be great if Hal Russell were still around serving up his wonderfully skewed jazz-rock, but this is as wonderful and fitting an epitaph as one could hope for."

The DownBeat review by Bill Shoemaker says that "Russell's circuitous route to Haldom is recounted here as a gloriously kaleidoscopic sound experience waxed just five weeks before his death."

== Track listing ==
All compositions by Hal Russell except as indicated

1. "Intro and Fanfare/Toy Parade/Trumpet March/Riverside Jump" – 5:22
2. "Krupa" – 5:36
3. "You're Blasé" (Ord Hamilton) – 1:51
4. "Dark Rapture" (Benny Goodman, Manny Kurtz, Edgar Sampson) – 2:44
5. "World Class" – 2:25
6. "Wood Chips" – 2:31
7. "My Little Grass Shack" (Bill Cogswell, Tommy Harrison, Johnny Noble) – 2:36
8. "O & B" – 3:44
9. "For M" – 6:17
10. "Gloomy Sunday" (Rezső Seress) – 2:31
11. "Hair Male" – 3:13
12. "Bossa G" – 0:38
13. "Mildred" – 1:07
14. "Dope Music" – 1:44
15. "The 2 x 2" – 3:13
16. "The Ayler Songs" – 5:53
17. "Rehcabnettul" – 4:05
18. "Steve's Freedom Principle" – 5:33
19. "Lady in the Lake" (Kent Kessler) – 3:31
20. "Oh Well" (Peter Green) – 2:39

== Personnel ==
=== Hall Russell NRG Ensemble ===
- Hal Russell – tenor saxophone, soprano saxophone, trumpet, xylophone, drums, percussion, gong, narrator, vocals
- Mars Williams – tenor saxophone, alto saxophone, bass saxophone, toy horns, wood flute, didgeridoo, bells, sounds, narrator
- Brian Sandstrom – bass, trumpet, electric guitar, toy horns, percussion
- Kent Kessler – bass, trombone
- Steve Hunt – drums, vibraphone, timpani, percussion
