= Make Some Noise (Liquid Soul album) =

Studio album by Liquid Soul
- Released: May 5, 1998
- Recorded: 1997
- Genre: Acid jazz
- Length: 54:46
- Label: Ark 21

Professional ratings
Review scores
Source	Rating
AllMusic	4/5 stars

Make Some Noise is the second album by Liquid Soul.

== Track listing ==
1. "Intro" – 0:45
2. "Threadin' The Needle" – 4:05
3. "Salt Peanuts/Chocolate Covered Nut" – 4:44
4. "Yankee Girl" – 5:21
5. "I Want You To Want Me" – 4:28
6. "Ricky's Hat" – 3:56
7. "Cabbage Roll" – 4:47
8. "Ramblin'" – 2:58
9. "Cookie's Puss" – 4:18
10. "No Cents" – 4:57
11. "My Three S.O.B.'s" – 4:19
12. "Lobster Boy's Revenge" – 3:30
13. "Opium Jacuzzi" – 6:38

== Personnel ==
- Ajax – Turntables
- Chris Cameron – Keyboards
- Jesse Delapena – Turntables
- Kurt Elling – Vocals
- Trine Rein - Vocals on 'I Want You To Want Me'
- Yvonne Gage – Vocals (background)
- Ron Haynes – Trumpet, Flugelhorn
- Frankie Hill – Keyboards
- John Janowiak – Trombone
- Walter Sargent -Rapper/MC
- Tommy Klein – Guitar
- Dan Leali – Percussion, Drums
- Joe Rendon – Timbales
- Tommy Sanchez – Guitar
- Ricky Showalter – Bass
- Mars Williams – Saxophone, Sax (Alto), Sax (Soprano), Sax (Tenor), Trumpet, Producer

== Production ==
- Rick Barnes – Engineer, Mixing
- Chris Bauer – Assistant Engineer
- Andy Engel – Design
- Neil Gustafson – Engineer, Live Sound
- Eric Heintz – Digital Imaging
- Steve Jacula – Engineer
- Neil Jensen – Engineer, Assistant Engineer
- Don Miller – Photography
- Scott Ramsayer – Engineer
- Mike Rogers – Producer
- Paul Zerang – Engineer, Live Sound
