= Mars Williams =

American jazz and rock saxophonist (1955–2023)

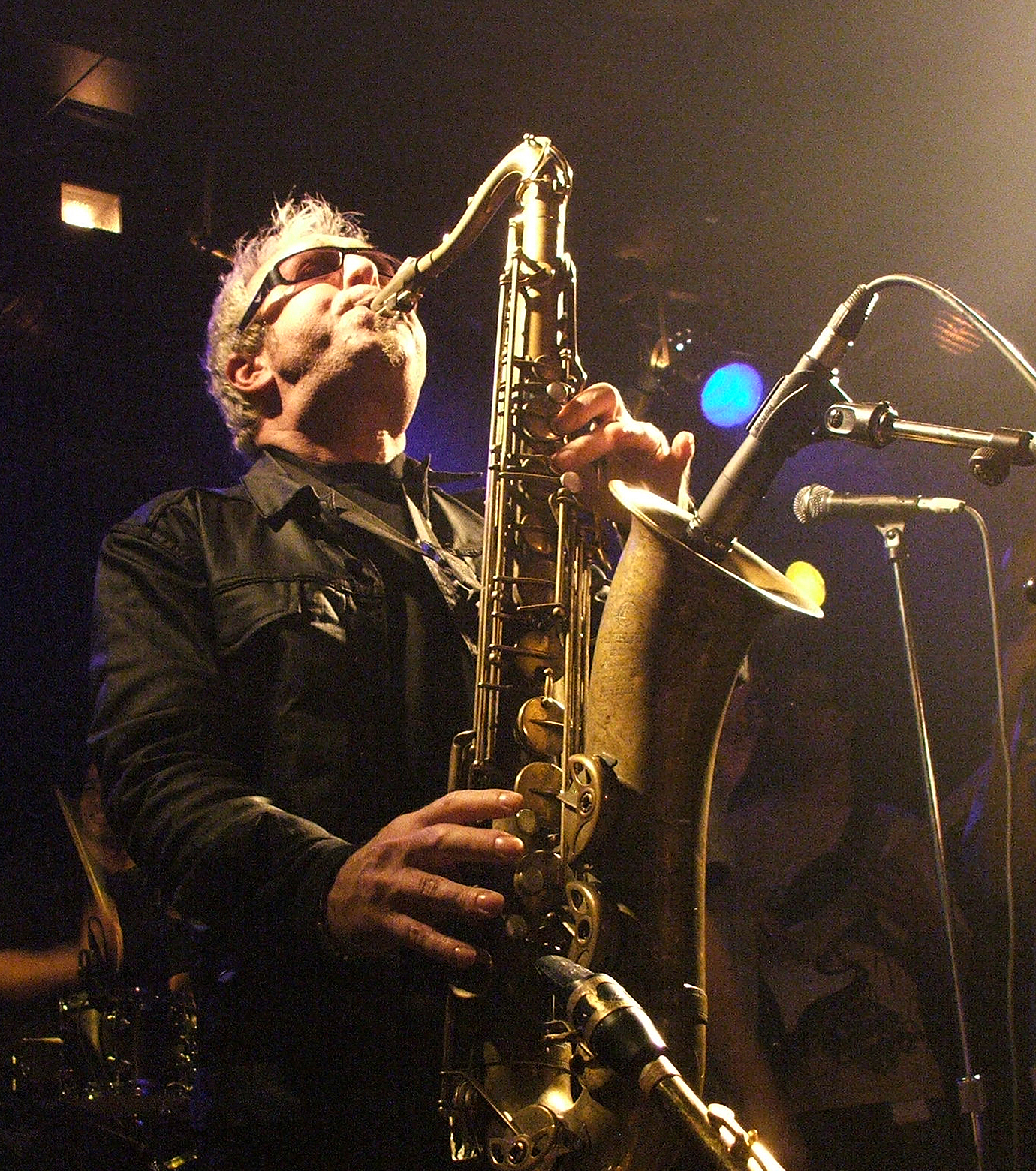
- Williams performing in 2011

Background information
- Born: Marc Charles Williams; May 29, 1955; Elmhurst, Illinois, U.S.
- Died: November 20, 2023 (aged 68) Chicago, Illinois, U.S.
- Genres: Rock; jazz; new wave
- Occupations: Musician; orchestrator; arranger
- Instruments: Saxophone; clarinet
- Formerly of: Liquid Soul; The Psychedelic Furs; The Waitresses
- Spouse: Liz Izzo-Williams (m. 1990)
- Website: marswilliams.com

Marc Charles "Mars" Williams (May 29, 1955 – November 20, 2023) was an American jazz and rock saxophonist. He was a member of the American new wave band the Waitresses from 1980 to 1983, and a member of the British post-punk band the Psychedelic Furs from 1983 to 1989 and again from 2005 until his death in 2023. Williams also was a founding member of the acid jazz group Liquid Soul, and a member of the free jazz-oriented NRG Ensemble.

== Early life, family and education ==
Exposed to swing music and Dixieland jazz by his trumpeter father, Williams played classical clarinet for ten years before migrating to saxophone in his last year of high school, citing the influence of Eric Dolphy, John Coltrane and Charlie Parker. After attending DePaul University for a period of time, he took courses from the Association for the Advancement of Creative Musicians, where he studied under founders Anthony Braxton and Roscoe Mitchell. In 2004, he was selected by the Moers Festival as their featured artist.

== Career ==
As a musician, orchestrator and arranger, Williams was best known for his 1980-1983 tenure with The Waitresses and his ensuing career with The Psychedelic Furs. He was only to tour with The Furs in Australia for a month in 1983 as a temporary replacement for touring saxophonist Gary Windo, who was unable to make the trip. Following a successful tour with The Furs and the concomitant breakup of The Waitresses, he stayed on as a permanent member of the former group until 1989, ultimately rejoining in 2005. He also performed with Billy Idol, the Power Station, Billy Squier, Massacre, Ministry, Die Warzau, and the Ike Reilly Assassination. According to longtime Grateful Dead manager Rock Scully, Williams occasionally performed in ad-hoc ensembles at the Blues Bar (a private TriBeCa afterhours club operated by Saturday Night Live cast members Dan Aykroyd and John Belushi, throughout their tenure on the show in the late 1970s) with such 1960s rock luminaries as Rick Danko and Bill Kreutzmann.

Williams toured and recorded with the Peter Brötzmann Tentet, the Vandermark 5, Cinghiale, Our Daughter's Wedding, and Mark Freeland's Electroman, and was the bandleader of several spin-off jazz groups: Grammy Award nominated, acid jazz pioneer Liquid Soul, Hal Russell's NRG Ensemble, Witches & Devils, Slam, the Devil's Whistle and XmarsX. He was active in the Chicago improvisational jazz underground scene both individually and as a member of the quartet Extraordinary Popular Delusions (which, as of 2026, continues on after Williams's death, co-led primarily by Jim Baker and Edward Wilkerson Jr.). He was known for his yearly Ayler Christmas concerts, leading a band of seasoned improvisers through free jazz holiday song covers, a tradition which continues past his death.

Williams taught music classes at several colleges, including Bard College, the University of Massachusetts at Amherst, the University of Chicago, Roosevelt University and the Jule Collins Smith Museum of Fine Art. He instructed students on woodwind instruments and jazz history.

Beginning in Fall 2024, Chicago-based gallery and record company Corbett vs. Dempsey began releasing recordings of Williams, chosen before his death. Dubbed the "Mars Archive," there are four released tapes as of June 2026.

== Death ==
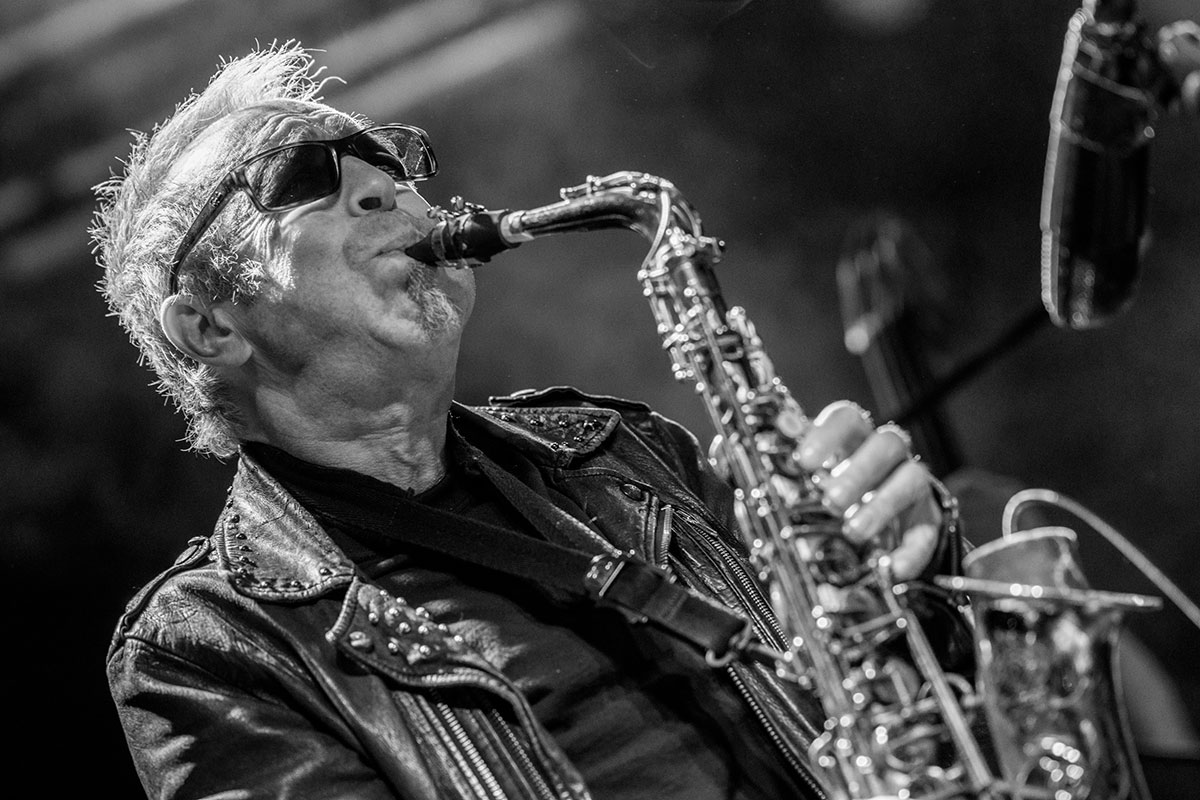
Williams performing in 2022

Williams died in Chicago from periampullary cancer on November 20, 2023, at the age of 68. He had been diagnosed with cancer in 2022. Williams had played his final concerts with the Psychedelic Furs in October 2023.

== Discography ==
=== As leader/co-leader ===
- Eftsoons (Nessa, 1981 [1985]) with Hal Russell
- Cinghiale: Hoofbeats of the Snorting Swine (Eight Day, 1996) with Ken Vandermark
- Witches & Devils: At the Empty Bottle (Knitting Factory, 2000)
- Moments Form (Idyllic Noise, 2013)

With Boneshaker (Mars Williams, Paal Nilssen-Love, Kent Kessler)

- Boneshaker (Trost, 2012)
- Unusual Words (Soul What, 2014)
- Thinking Out Loud (Trost, 2017)
- Fake Music (Soul What, 2019)

With EPD (Jim Baker, Steve Hunt, Brian Sandstrom)

- The Last Quintet (Corbett vs. Dempsey, 2025)

With the NRG Ensemble

- Calling All Mothers (Quinnah, 1994)
- This Is My House (Delmark, 1996)
- Bejazzo Gets a Facelift (Atavaistic, 1998)
- Hold That Thought (Corbett vs. Dempsey, 2024) Mars Archive #2

With Liquid Soul

- Liquid Soul (1995)
- Make Some Noise (1998)
- Here's the Deal (2000)
- Evolution (2002)
- One-Two Punch (2006)

With Switchback (Wacław Zimpel / Hilliard Greene / Klaus Kugel)

- Switchback (Multikulti, 2015)
- Live in Ukraine (Multikulti, 2016)

=== As sideman ===
With Harrison Bankhead

- Morning Sun/Harvest Moon (Engine, 2011)
- Velvet Blue (Engine, 2013)

With Peter Brötzmann

- The Chicago Octet/Tentet (Okka Disc, 1998)

With Hamid Drake

- I Know You Are But What Am I? (Corbett vs. Dempsey, 2024) Mars Archive #1

With Hal Russell / NRG Ensemble

- Elixir (Atavistic, 1979 [2001])
- Hal on Earth (Abduction, 1989)
- The Finnish/Swiss Tour (ECM, 1991)
- The Hal Russell Story (ECM, 1993)

With Ken Vandermark

- Standards (Quinnah, 1995)
- Barrage Double Trio: Utility Hitter (Quinnah, 1996)
- Vandermark 5: Single Piece Flow (Atavistic, 1997)
- Vandermark 5: Target or Flag (Atavistic, 1998)

With Darin Gray, Chris Corsano

- Elastic (Corbett vs. Dempsey, 2024) Mars Archive #3

With The Swollen Monkeys

- Afterbirth of the Cool (Cachalot, 1981) produced by Hal Willner

With The Luck of Eden Hall

- Ten Meters Over The Ground (Alligators Eat Gumdrops, ltd edition 200, 2012)

With Custard Flux

- Oxygen/Gelatinous Mass (Oxygen CFX002, 2020)
- Phosphorus, The Gardener, Strawberry Squid, Orbital Transport (Phosphorus CF003, 2022)
