= Double Door =

Former music venue in Chicago, Illinois

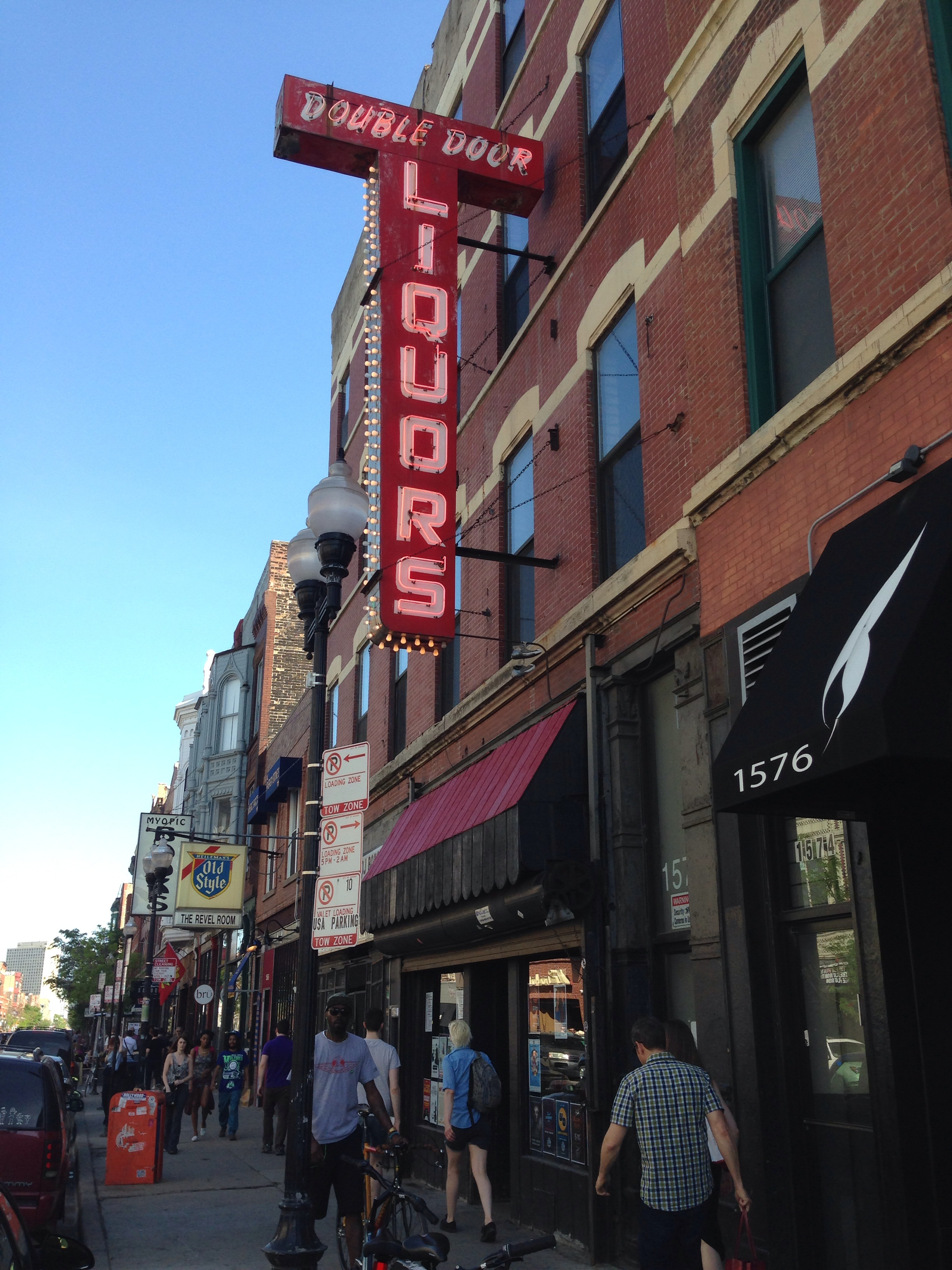
- Interactive map of Double Door
- Location: 1572 N. Milwaukee Avenue, Wicker Park, Chicago, Illinois, United States
- Coordinates: 41°54′36″N 87°40′37.3″W
- Capacity: About 500

Construction
- Opened: June 1994
- Closed: February 2017

Website
- www.doubledoor.com

Double Door was a concert hall and nightclub in the Wicker Park neighborhood of Chicago, Illinois. The roughly 500-capacity venue operated at 1572 N. Milwaukee Avenue from June 1994 until a court-ordered eviction in February 2017.

After the eviction, the owners pursued proposals to reopen elsewhere in Chicago. A plan to renovate the former Wilson Avenue Theater in Uptown was abandoned in February 2026 after projected costs increased and the owners could not complete the financing. Double Door subsequently began presenting pop-up events and collaborating on programming at Gallery Cabaret while its owners continued searching for another location.

== History ==
=== Wicker Park venue ===
Double Door opened in June 1994 with an acoustic performance by Lloyd Cole. It became associated with Wicker Park's alternative-music scene and hosted Chicago acts including The Smashing Pumpkins, Liz Phair and Veruca Salt, as well as touring performers. The venue consisted of a main room and mezzanine, with a basement bar. The basement space, previously called the Dirtroom, reopened as Door No. 3 in 2013 and presented DJs and other events.

In 2005, the club was nearly shut down due to disagreements about its lease. The landlord, Brian Strauss, doubled the venue's rent.

Strauss began a new eviction action in November 2015, alleging that Double Door had not properly exercised an option to renew its lease. A judge entered a possession order for the landlord in August 2016. The Cook County sheriff enforced the order in February 2017 after Double Door failed to post a court-ordered appeal bond.

=== Relocation proposals ===
While contesting the eviction, the owners proposed moving Double Door to the former Logan Square State and Savings Bank building at 2551 N. Milwaukee Avenue in Logan Square. In December 2018, a different plan was announced to establish the venue at 1050 W. Wilson Avenue in Uptown. The building, constructed as the Wilson Avenue Theater and later used as a bank, had been vacant since 2011.

The Wilson Theater redevelopment received approval from the Chicago Plan Commission in December 2020 and the Chicago City Council in January 2021. Peter Bruce acquired the theater from developer Cedar Street for $750,000 in 2021 and joined Double Door co-owner Sean Mulroney in developing the proposed venue.

By February 2024, the project had obtained construction permits and was targeting an opening in late 2024 or early 2025. Mulroney and Bruce raised about $1 million from private investors and secured a $5 million community development grant from the city. They held several small concerts and public tours at the building, but the venue did not open. In February 2026, Mulroney announced that the Wilson Theater project would not proceed. Renovation estimates had increased from an initial $2–3 million to about $9 million, access to the city grant had expired, and the partners had been unable to obtain the remaining financing.

== Notable events and media ==
Double Door hosted a surprise performance by the Rolling Stones in 1997 before the band's concerts at Soldier Field. The venue was also used as a filming location for the 2000 film High Fidelity.
