= Charles Tyler (musician) =

American jazz saxophonist

- Born: Charles Lacy Tyler; July 20, 1941; Cadiz, Kentucky, U.S.
- Died: June 27, 1992 (aged 50) Toulon, France
- Genres: Jazz, free jazz
- Occupation: Musician
- Instrument(s): Baritone sax, alto sax
- Labels: ESP-Disk, Nessa, Adelphi, Sonet, Storyville, Bleu Regard, Silkheart

Charles Lacy Tyler (July 20, 1941 – June 27, 1992) was an American jazz saxophonist. He focused on baritone & alto saxophone and also played clarinet.

== Biography ==
Tyler was born in Cadiz, Kentucky, United States, and spent his childhood years in Indianapolis. He played piano as a child and clarinet at the age of seven, before switching to alto saxophone in his early teens, and finally baritone saxophone. During the summers, he visited Chicago, Illinois, New York City and Cleveland, Ohio, where he met the young tenor saxophonist Albert Ayler at age 14. After serving in the army from 1957–1959, Tyler relocated to Cleveland in 1960 and began playing with Ayler, commuting between New York and Cleveland. During that period played with Ornette Coleman and Sunny Murray.

In 1965, Tyler recorded Bells and Spirits Rejoice with Ayler's group. He recorded his first album as leader the following year for ESP-Disk. He returned to Indianapolis to study with David Baker at Indiana University between 1967 and 1968, recording a second album for ESP, Eastern Man Alone. In 1968, he transferred to the University of California, Berkeley to study and teach. In Los Angeles, he worked with Arthur Blythe, Bobby Bradford, and David Murray.

He moved back to New York in 1974, leading his own groups with Blythe, trumpeter Earl Cross, drummer Steve Reid and others, recording the album Voyage from Jericho on Tyler's own Akba label. In 1975, Tyler enrolled at Columbia University and made an extensive tour of Scandinavia, releasing his second Akba album Live in Europe. In 1976, he performed a piece titled "Saga of the Outlaws" at Sam Rivers's Studio Rivbea; a recording was released by Nessa Records two years later on an album of the same name. During that period he played as a sideman or co-leader with Steve Reid, Cecil Taylor and Billy Bang.

In 1982, during a European tour with Sun Ra's Orchestra, he relocated to Stockholm, Sweden, and in 1985 he moved to France, recording with other expatriates like Khan Jamal in Copenhagen and Steve Lacy in Paris.

Tyler died in Toulon, France, of heart failure in June 1992.

== Discography ==
=== As leader ===
- Charles Tyler Ensemble (ESP Disk, 1966)
- Eastern Man Alone (ESP Disk, 1967)
- Voyage from Jericho (AK-BA, 1975)
- Live in Europe: Jazz Festival Umea (AK-BA, 1977)
- Saga of the Outlaws (Nessa, 1978)
- Sixty Minute Man (Adelphi, 1980)
- Folk and Mystery Stories (Sonet, 1980)
- Definite Volume 1 (Storyville, 1982)
- Definite Volume 2 (Storyville, 1984)
- Live at Green Space with Billy Bang (Anima, 1982)
- Autumn in Paris (Silkheart, 1988)
- Folly Fun Music Magic (Bleu Regard, 1992)
- Mid Western Drifter (Bleu Regard, 1992)
- Live at Sweet Basil Volume 1 (Bleu Regard, 2006)
- Live at Sweet Basil Volume 2 (Bleu Regard, 2006)
- At WKCR (Sinner Lady Gloria, 2014)

=== As sideman ===
With Albert Ayler

- Bells (ESP Disk, 1965)
- Spirits Rejoice (ESP Disk, 1965)
- Bells Prophecy (ESP Disk, 1997)

With Billy Bang

- Rainbow Gladiator (Soul Note, 1981)
- Invitation (Soul Note, 1982)
- Outline No. 12 (Celluloid, 1982 [1983])

With Steve Reid

- Rhythmatism (Mustevic Sound, 1976)
- Odyssey of the Oblong Square (Mustevic Sound, 1977)

With others

- Denis Charles, Remi Charmasson, Bernard Santacruz, A Scream for Charles Tyler (Bleu Regard, 1992)
- Eugene Chadbourne, Boogie with the Hook (Leo, 1996)
- Ted Daniel, In the Beginning (Altura Music, 1997)
- Richard Dunbar, Running Buddies Vol. 1 (Jahari, 1983)
- John Fischer, 6x1=10 Duos for a New Decade (ReEntry, 1980)
- Khan Jamal, Dark Warrior (SteepleChase, 1984)
- Steve Lacy, One Fell Swoop (Silkheart, 1987)
- Wilber Morris, Collective Improvisations (Bleu Regard, 1994)
- Hal Russell, Generation (Chief, 1989)
