= NRG Ensemble =

NRG Ensemble was an American free jazz ensemble founded in the late 1970s by saxophonist/multi-instrumentalist Hal Russell.

The group's personnel was somewhat fluid, but included a core of drummer Steve Hunt, saxophonist Mars Williams, guitarist/trumpeter Brian Sandstrom, and bassist Kent Kessler. Their music kept free jazz alive in Chicago throughout the 1980s, when it had largely disappeared from the jazz landscape. Russell was the primary composer, but the other musicians contributed songs as well. Their punning song and album titles (Conserving NRG, Hal on Earth) reflected the humor that permeated Russell's music.

After Russell's death in 1992, the NRG Ensemble recruited saxophonist Ken Vandermark as a replacement, recording three more albums under the leadership of Williams.

== Discography ==
- NRG Ensemble (Nessa, 1981)
- Generation (Nessa, 1982) - with Charles Tyler
- Conserving NRG (Principally Jazz, 1984)
- Hal on Earth (Abduction, 1989)
- The Finnish/Swiss Tour (ECM, 1991)
- The Hal Russell Story (ECM, 1993)
- Calling All Mothers (Quinnah, 1994)
- This Is My House (Delmark, 1996)
- Bejazzo Gets a Facelift (Atavistic, 1998)

== Personnel ==
- Hal Russell (1-6) - Tenor, alto & soprano saxophones, trumpet, cornet, vibraphone, drums, percussion
- Chuck Burdelik (1-3) - Tenor & alto saxophones, clarinet, percussion
- Curt Bley (1-3) - Acoustic & electric bass
- Brian Sandstrom (1-9) – Acoustic bass, electric guitar, trumpet, percussion
- Steve Hunt (1-9) – Drums, percussion, vibraphone, didgeridoo
- Charles Tyler (2) - Baritone and alto saxophones, clarinet
- Mars Williams (4-9) - Tenor, alto, soprano & bass saxophones, didgeridoo
- Kent Kessler (4-9) - Acoustic bass, kalimba, didgeridoo, trombone
- Ken Vandermark (7-9) - Tenor saxophone, clarinet, bass clarinet
