= Hal Russell =

American jazz composer, band leader and musician

- Born: Harold Russell Luttenbacher; August 28, 1926; Detroit, Michigan, United States
- Died: September 5, 1992 (aged 66) La Grange, Illinois, United States
- Genres: Jazz; Free jazz Avant-garde jazz
- Occupation: Musician
- Instruments: Drums, vibes, tenor sax, soprano sax, trumpet
- Labels: Nessa Records, ECM Records, Silkheart Records

Hal Russell (born Harold Russell Luttenbacher, August 28, 1926 – September 5, 1992) was an American free jazz composer, band leader and multi-instrumentalist who performed mainly on saxophone and drums but occasionally on trumpet or vibraphone. Russell's fiery music was marked by significant humor, not unlike much of Dutch drummer Han Bennink's output. His music was so accessible that People magazine hailed The Finnish Swiss Tour on ECM as one of its top 5 albums of the year. Russell set the table for the free improv and free jazz scene which exploded later in the 1990s in Chicago.

== Biography ==
Born in Detroit, Michigan, United States, and raised in Chicago, Illinois, from the eighth grade, Russell began playing drums at age four, but majored in trumpet at college; he subsequently drummed in several big bands, including those of Woody Herman and Boyd Raeburn.

As with many young players in the mid-1940s, Russell's life was irreversibly changed by bebop. In the 1950s he worked with musicians including Miles Davis, Billie Holiday, Sonny Rollins, John Coltrane, and Duke Ellington. He succumbed to drugs and was a heroin addict for ten years. In 1959, he joined the Joe Daley Trio, whose Newport' 1963, which was mostly studio material, was reputedly one of the earliest free jazz records.

In the early 1970s, Russell was the regular percussionist for the band at the suburban Chicago Candlelight Dinner Playhouse. Here he played mostly drums, but occasionally vibes and keyboards. At the same time he would host many young jazz musicians for jam sessions at his home, or in Chicago nightclubs.

In 1979, Russell formed the NRG Ensemble, which for most of its existence featured saxophonist Mars Williams, multi-instrumentalist Brian Sandstrom, and percussionist Steve Hunt, among others. At this time he starting playing tenor saxophone, soprano saxophone and trumpet, in addition to drums and vibes. Russell finally issued his first album in 1981 for the Nessa label. In the late 1980s, the group began playing frequently in Europe, and began recording for ECM with The Finnish/Swiss Tour. Russell led the NRG Ensemble until his death.

In addition to the NRG Ensemble, Russell always maintained several auxiliary bands, a partnership with pianist Joel Futterman, the rock-oriented trio NRG 3 with Ed Ludwig on drums and Noel Kupersmith on bass, and The Flying Luttenbachers with Chad Organ on tenor sax and Weasel Walter on drums.

Cited by some as a missing link between the AACM and later Chicago free jazz, Russell was experiencing greater public awareness before his death. Just after completing the semi-autobiographical album The Hal Russell Story, Russell died of a heart attack in September 1992.

== Discography ==
- Elixir (Atavistic, 1979, issued 2001)
- NRG Ensemble (Nessa, 1981) – with NRG Ensemble
- Eftsoons (Nessa, 1981) – with Mars Williams
- Generation (Nessa, 1982) – with NRG Ensemble & Charles Tyler
- Conserving NRG (Principally Jazz, 1984) – with NRG Ensemble
- Hal on Earth (Abduction, 1989) – with NRG Ensemble
- The Finnish/Swiss Tour (ECM, 1991) – with NRG Ensemble
- Albert's Lullaby (Southport, 1991, issued 2000) - with Michael Staron
- Naked Colours (Silkheart, 1991 [1994]) – with Joel Futterman
- Hal's Bells (ECM, 1992)
- The Hal Russell Story (ECM, 1993) – with NRG Ensemble

With The Flying Luttenbachers

- Destructo Noise Explosion!: Live at WNUR 2-6-92 (ugEXPLODE, 1992)
