= Fractured Dimensions =

Live album by William Parker
- Released: 2003
- Recorded: November 7, 1999
- Venue: Podewil, Berlin
- Genre: Jazz
- Length: 78:03
- Label: FMP
- Producer: Jost Gebers

William Parker chronology
Posium Pendasem (1998)	Fractured Dimensions (2003)	Mayor of Punkville (1999)

Fractured Dimensions is an album by American jazz double bassist William Parker, which was recorded live during the Berlin Total Music Meeting in 1999 and released on the German FMP label in 2003.

The band originally billed to play was the free jazz quartet Other Dimensions In Music, but Rashid Bakr's unavailability led to the fortuitous last-minute substitution of Alan Silva.

== Reception ==
Professional ratings
Review scores
Source	Rating
AllMusic	3/5 stars
The Penguin Guide to Jazz	3.5/4 stars

In his review for AllMusic, François Couture states "Digital synthesizers are not often heard in free improvisation contexts. They sound a bit cold and intrusive. But Silva's playing is so colorful that one quickly leaves his apprehensions behind."

The Penguin Guide to Jazz says that "the absence of percussion, unusual sound of a digital synth and occasional presence of two trumpeters give the music an unusual sonority."

== Track listing ==
All compositions by Parker, Campbell, Carter & Silva

1. "Figures Standing in the Door" - 6:32
2. "Eternal Flower" - 3:38
3. "End of Famina" - 7:39
4. "Vermeer" - 10:12
5. "Acrosses Rain" - 33:48
6. "Sonnet For Armstrong" - 16:14

== Personnel ==
- William Parker - bass
- Roy Campbell - trumpet, flugelhorn
- Daniel Carter - flute, clarinet, alto sax, trumpet
- Alan Silva - synthesizer, piano
