= Mirror Repair =

EP by Gastr del Sol
- Released: 1994
- Genre: Post-rock
- Length: 21:01
- Label: Drag City

Gastr del Sol chronology
Crookt, Crackt, or Fly (1994)	Mirror Repair (1994)	Upgrade & Afterlife (1995)

Professional ratings
Review scores
Source	Rating

Mirror Repair is a 1994 EP by Gastr del Sol released on Drag City. The album was written and performed by David Grubbs and Jim O'Rourke.

== Track listing ==
1. "Photographed Yawning" - 0:50
2. "Eight Corners" - 8:53
3. "Dictionary Of Handwriting" – 6:02
4. "Why Sleep" – 2:02
5. "Mirror Repair" – 3:14
