= Strata (Matthew Shipp album) =

Studio album by Matthew Shipp
- Released: 1998
- Recorded: December 14, 1997
- Studio: Sorcerer Sound, New York City
- Genre: Jazz
- Length: 58:48
- Label: hatOLOGY
- Producer: Art Lange, Pia & Werner X. Uehlinger

Matthew Shipp chronology
The Multiplication Table (1998)	Strata (1998)	DNA (1999)

Strata is an album by the American jazz pianist Matthew Shipp, recorded in 1997 and released on the Swiss hatOLOGY label.

The album features the Horn Quartet, a chamber-jazz group without drums composed of Shipp and three members of the band Other Dimensions In Music: trumpeter Roy Campbell, multi-instrumentalist Daniel Carter and bassist William Parker. Two weeks before, Shipp played as guest on Other Dimensions In Music live album Time Is of the Essence Is Beyond Time.

== Reception ==
Professional ratings
Review scores
Source	Rating
AllMusic	4/5 stars
The Penguin Guide to Jazz	3/4 stars
(The New) Rolling Stone Album Guide	3/5 stars

In his review for AllMusic, Thom Jurek states: "It is a stunning work, really, that showcases Shipp at the height of his compositional and improvisational powers, and points the way to the flowering of his vast talent as an arranger as well." The Penguin Guide to Jazz wrote that "Campbell is a diehard free jazz man and he puts some warmth into the surroundings."

== Track listing ==
All compositions by Matthew Shipp

1. "Strata 1" – 0:47
2. "Strata 2" – 1:23
3. "Strata 3" – 7:45
4. "Strata 4" – 3:18
5. "Strata 5" – 7:05
6. "Strata 6" – 3:33
7. "Strata 7" – 5:36
8. "Strata 8" – 5:30
9. "Strata 9" – 5:43
10. "Strata 10" – 5:20
11. "Strata 11" – 4:18
12. "Strata 12" – 6:41
13. "Strata 13" – 0:59
14. "Strata 14" – 0:50

== Personnel ==
- Roy Campbell – trumpet, pocket trumpet
- Daniel Carter – alto sax, tenor sax, flute, trumpet
- William Parker – bass
- Matthew Shipp – piano
