= The Serpentine Similar =

Studio album by Gastr del Sol
- Released: June 1, 1993
- Recorded: September – November 1992
- Studio: Experimental Sound (Chicago, Illinois); 5th Floor (Minneapolis, Minnesota)
- Genre: Art rock
- Length: 31:02
- Label: TeenBeat
- Producer: Brian Paulson

Gastr del Sol chronology
The Serpentine Similar (1993)	Crookt, Crackt, or Fly (1994)

The Serpentine Similar is the debut studio album by American indie rock band Gastr del Sol, released on June 1, 1993, by TeenBeat Records. The album was re-released by Drag City on June 16, 1997.

== Background ==
Guitarist David Grubbs and drummer John McEntire had played together in the post-hardcore band Bastro with bassist Clark Johnson. When Johnson left Bastro in 1991 to attend law school, Bundy K. Brown joined and the group began writing new material, later documented as the instrumental live album Antlers: Live 1991. These songs were then reworked as quieter, acoustic versions for The Serpentine Similar as Bastro became Gastr del Sol.

== Critical reception ==
Professional ratings
Review scores
Source	Rating
AllMusic	4/5 stars

In 2007, The Guardian concluded that "art rock doesn't get much brighter or more accessible."

== Track listing ==
All tracks are written by Bundy K. Brown and David Grubbs.

No.	Title	Length
1.	"A Watery Kentucky"	9:18
2.	"Easy Company"	1:08
3.	"A Jar of Fat"	2:10
4.	"Ursus Arctos Wonderfilis"	4:46
5.	"Eye Street"	1:50
6.	"For Soren Müeller"	4:19
7.	"Serpentine Orbit"	0:45
8.	"Even the Odd Orbit"	6:50

== Personnel ==
Adapted from The Serpentine Similar liner notes.

Gastr del Sol

- Bundy K. Brown – instruments
- David Grubbs – instruments

Additional musicians

- John McEntire – additional percussion

Production and additional personnel

- Michael O'Bannon – cover art
- Brian Paulson – production, recording

== Release history ==
Region	Date	Label	Format	Catalog
United States	1993	TeenBeat	CD, LP	TEENBEAT 95
United States	1997	Drag City	CD, LP	DC106
