= The Blue Hotel =

1898 short story by Stephen Crane

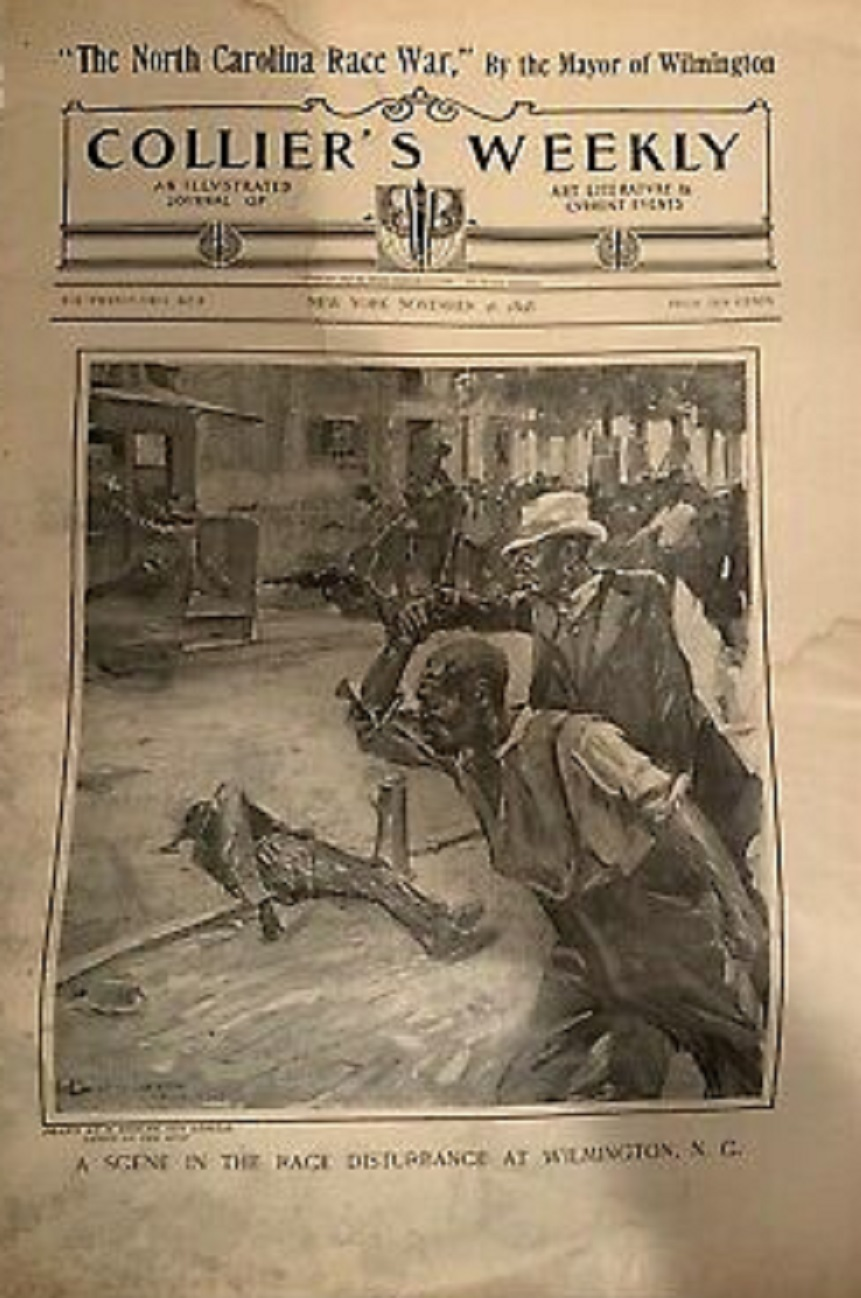
First appearance in Collier's, November 26, 1898, first installment

"The Blue Hotel" is a short story by American author Stephen Crane (1871–1900). It first appeared in 1898 in two installments in Collier's Weekly, on November 26 and on December 3, 1898. It subsequently was republished in the collection The Monster and Other Stories.

== Background ==
It is one of the most well known of the short stories in the collection The Monster and Other Stories. Although it appears to be a reasonably simple tale about a man who encounters trouble following a stay at the Palace Hotel, several complex themes underpin the story and define many of the overarching themes in novels like Maggie: A Girl of the Streets and more generally, Crane's corpus. Stylistically, the story breaks free from the norms of the period, often entering the realms of Expressionism, an unusual style to encounter in American literature.

== Adaptations ==
- 1977: "The Blue Hotel", a TV movie adaptation directed by Ján Kadár
- 1999: The Coxcomb (1999 album), a musical adaptation by David Grubbs

== Response ==
Author Ernest Hemingway references the story in his 1935 book Green Hills of Africa and calls "The Blue Hotel" and "The Open Boat" Crane's two best stories.

The short story was a partial inspiration for the film The Shining (1980).
