= M'Boom =

American jazz percussion ensemble

- M'Boom at a jazz workshop at hosted by Amherst University, January 26, 1974

Background information
- Genre: Jazz
- Years active: 1970–1990s
- Labels: Baystate, Columbia, Soul Note, Blue Moon
- Members: Joe Chambers; Warren Smith; Bobby Sanabria
- Past members: Joe Chambers; Max Roach; Ray Mantilla; Roy Brooks; Warren Smith; Freddie Waits; Omar Clay; Eli Fountain; Fred King; Craig McIver; Eddie Allen; Francisco Mora Catlett; Kenyatte Abdur-Rahman; Steve Berrios; Richard "Pablo" Landrum; Ray Mantilla

M'Boom was an American jazz percussion group founded by drummer Max Roach in 1970. The original members were Roach, Roy Brooks, Warren Smith, Joe Chambers, Omar Clay, Ray Mantilla, and Freddie Waits.

All of M'Boom's members are and always have been percussionists, employing numerous percussion instruments besides the drums. These include bells, gongs, marimba, timpani, vibraphone, xylophone, and musical saw.

== Discography ==
- 1973: Re: Percussion (Strata-East)
- 1973: Re: Percussion (Baystate)
- 1979: M'Boom (Columbia)
- 1984: Collage (Soul Note)
- 1991: To the Max! (Enja)
- 1992: Live at S.O.B.'s New York (Blue Moon)
