= Magnetism (disambiguation) =

Magnetism is a phenomenon in physics by which materials exert an attractive or repulsive force on other materials.

Magnetism may also refer to:

- Magnetism (album), album by Matthew Shipp
- Magnetism, song by Eugene Record
- Animal magnetism, variously sexual attraction, vital force or hypnotism
