= The Harp Factory on Lake Street =

Studio album by Gastr del Sol
- Released: January 1995
- Recorded: 1995
- Genre: Avant-garde jazz
- Length: 17:12
- Label: Table of the Elements
- Producer: Jim O'Rourke

Gastr del Sol chronology
Crookt, Crackt, or Fly (1994)	The Harp Factory on Lake Street (1995)	Upgrade & Afterlife (1996)

The Harp Factory on Lake Street is an album by the American band Gastr del Sol, released in 1995. It is named for Lyon & Healy's harp factory at the corner of Lake Street and Ogden Avenue, in Chicago. The album contains a single 17-minute track.

The Harp Factory on Lake Street was the first album for which Susan Archie designed the packaging; Archie has since won three Grammy Awards for packaging. The album was reissued in 2006.

== Critical reception ==
Professional ratings
Review scores
Source	Rating
AllMusic	3/5 stars

AllMusic wrote that the album "may not be of much interest to those who enjoy the pop aspects of Gastr del Sol's other work, but it fits well with the more experimental work of Chicago's post-rock and avant-jazz musicians."

== Track listing ==
1. "The Harp Factory on Lake Street"
