= Live at the Sunset =

Live album by Other Dimensions In Music
- Released: 2007
- Recorded: October 17 & 18, 2006
- Venue: Sunset, Paris
- Genre: Jazz
- Length: 152:22
- Label: Marge
- Producer: Gérard Terronès

Other Dimensions In Music chronology
Time Is of the Essence Is Beyond Time (2000)	Live at the Sunset (2007)	Kaiso Stories (2011)

Live at the Sunset is the fourth album by free jazz collective quartet Other Dimensions In Music, composed of trumpeter Roy Campbell, multi-instrumentalist Daniel Carter, bassist William Parker and Hamid Drake replacing regular drummer Rashid Bakr. It was recorded at the Sunset club in Paris in 2006 and released on the French Marge label.

== Reception ==
Professional ratings
Review scores
Source	Rating
The Free Jazz Collective	5/5 stars

The All About Jazz review by Clifford Allen states "The sort of freedom engendered by ODIM is one that can call upon funeral marches and jubilee shouts as easily as Africanized tone-rows and triple-time barnstorming."

A writer for The Free Jazz Collective commented: "Drake and Parker play like they are one person with two bodies, and their rhythmic foundation supports the tonal soundscapes weaved by Campbell and Carter, who both have a huge background, but more importantly, they play with the rare combination of emotional and creative power... excellent free playing, moving naturally, rhythmically, full of intensity, full of spirituality and musical vision."

== Track listing ==
All compositions by Other Dimensions In Music

Disc One:

1. "Announcement" - 1:10
2. "Other Dimensional Space Travelers" - 12:51
3. "Hip Bop" - 5:04
4. "Blues Configuration" - 12:15
5. "Slam Me Down" - 3:24
6. "Afro Caribbean High Life" - 4:26
7. "Blues for Baghdad" - 9:06
8. "Desert Dance" - 20:34

Disc Two:

1. "Blues for Iraq" - 12:03
2. "New Millenium Chaos" - 5:04
3. "Funk the Government / The Betrayal of New Orleans / Hurricane Katrina" - 3:17
4. "Suite for Miles Davis" - 9:54
5. "For Louis, Cootie and Lester" - 6:34
6. "Song of Hole and Peace for the Future of Humanity" - 10:56
7. "Call for the Gathering of All the Righteous and Spiritual People" - 20:09
8. "James Brown Ascension" - 5:37

== Personnel ==
- Roy Campbell - trumpet, pocket trumpet, flugelhorn, flute, recorder, shepherd pipes
- Daniel Carter - alto sax, flute, trumpet, voice
- William Parker - bass, musette
- Hamid Drake - drums, frame drum
