= Sacred Ground (Whit Dickey album) =

Studio album by Whit Dickey
- Released: 2006
- Recorded: November 10, 2004
- Studio: Peter Karl Studio, New York City
- Genre: Jazz
- Length: 46:29
- Label: Clean Feed
- Producer: Whit Dickey

Whit Dickey chronology
In a Heartbeat (2005)	Sacred Ground (2006)	Emergence (2009)

Sacred Ground is an album by American jazz drummer Whit Dickey recorded in 2004 and released on the Portuguese Clean Feed label. Dickey leads a quartet with Roy Campbell on trumpet, Rob Brown on alto sax and Joe Morris on double bass instead of his usual guitar, the same lineup as the previous album Coalescence.

== Reception ==
Professional ratings
Review scores
Source	Rating
The Penguin Guide to Jazz Recordings	3/4 stars

The All About Jazz by Scott Convery observes that "the sound is anything but traditional. The melodies are short and complex and bring to mind the precision of Frank Zappa or Henry Threadgill."

== Track listing ==
All compositions by Whit Dickey

1. "Vortex" – 7:15
2. "Soldier of Uncertainty" – 12:09
3. "Sacred Ground" – 8:38
4. "Vital Transmission" – 11:18
5. "Dream of Caravans" – 7:09

== Personnel ==
- Roy Campbell – trumpet
- Rob Brown – alto sax
- Joe Morris – double bass
- Whit Dickey – drums
