= Warren Smith (percussionist) =

American drummer

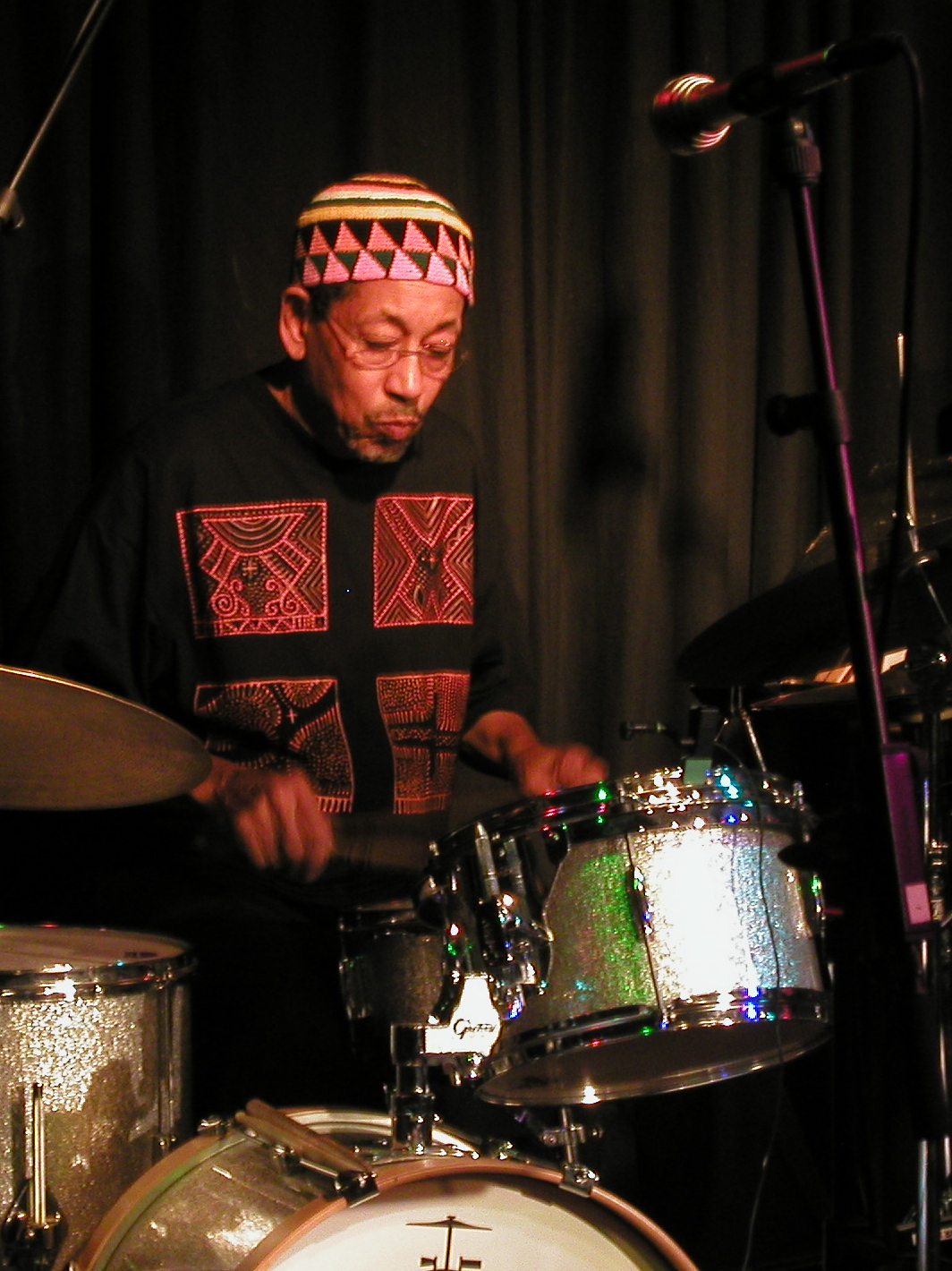
- Warren Smith performing in 2008

Background information
- Birth name: Warren Smith
- Born: May 14, 1934 (age 90); Chicago, Illinois
- Genres: Jazz
- Occupation: Musician
- Years active: 1959–present

Warren Smith (born May 14, 1934) is an American jazz drummer, percussionist, and timpanist, known as a contributor to Max Roach's M'boom ensemble and leader of the Composer's Workshop Ensemble (Strata-East).

== Biography ==
Smith was born May 14, 1934, in Chicago, Illinois, to a musical family. His father played saxophone and clarinet with Noble Sissle and Jimmie Noone, and his mother was a harpist and pianist. At the age of four, Smith studied clarinet with his father. He graduated from the University of Illinois in 1957, then received a master's degree in percussion from the Manhattan School of Music in 1958.

He found work in Broadway pit bands in 1958, and also played with Gil Evans that year. In 1961, he co-founded the Composers Workshop Ensemble. In the 1960s, Smith accompanied Aretha Franklin, Nina Simone, Lloyd Price, and Nat King Cole; he worked with Sam Rivers from 1964–1976 and with Gil Evans again from 1968 to 1976. In 1969, he played with Janis Joplin and in 1971 with King Curtis and Tony Williams. He was also a founding member of Max Roach's percussion ensemble, M'Boom, in 1970.

In the 1970s and 1980s, Smith had a loft called Studio Wis that acted as a performing and recording space for many young New York jazz musicians, such as Wadada Leo Smith and Oliver Lake. Through the 1970s, Smith played with Andrew White, Julius Hemphill, Muhal Richard Abrams, Nancy Wilson, Quincy Jones, Count Basie, and Carmen McRae. Other credits include extensive work with rock and pop musicians and time spent with Anthony Braxton, Charles Mingus, Henry Threadgill, Van Morrison, and Joe Zawinul. He continued to work on Broadway into the 1990s, and has performed with a number of classical ensembles.

Smith taught in the New York City public school system from 1958 to 1968, at Third Street Settlement from 1960 to 1967, at Adelphi University in 1970–1971, and at SUNY-Old Westbury from 1971.

== Discography ==
=== As leader ===
- 1973: Warren Smith and the Composer's Workshop Ensemble (Strata East)
- 1974: We've Been Around (& the Composer's Workshop Ensemble) (Strata East)
- 1975: Folks Song (Baystate)
- 1979: Warren Smith and Masami Nakagawa (RCA)
- 1979: Warren Smith and Toki (RCA)
- 1982: Cricket-Song Poem (& the Composer's Workshop Ensemble) (Miff Music Company)
- 1998: Cats Are Stealing My $hit (Mapleshade)
- 2007: Natural/Cultural Forces (Engine)
- 2009: Old News Borrowed Blues (& the Composer's Workshop Ensemble) (Engine)
- 2011: Dragon Dave Meets Prince Black Knight from the Darkside of the Moon (Porter) (recorded 1988)

- 1973, 1974 & 1982 Reissued in 1995 As Warren Smith & The Composer's Workshop Ensemble (Claves) 2xCD

=== As sideman ===
With Gene Ammons and Sonny Stitt

- Together Again for the Last Time (Prestige, 1973 [1976])

With Enrico Rava

- Pupa o Crisalide

With Sam Most, Kenny Barron, George Mraz

- From the Attic of My Mind (Xanadu Records, 1978)

With Kenny Barron

- Sunset to Dawn (Muse, 1973)

With Anthony Braxton

- Creative Orchestra Music 1976 (Arista, 1976)
- Six Standards (Quintet) 1996 (Splasc(H), 1995 [2004])

With Rob Brown

- Round the Bend (Bleu Regard, 2002)

With Jaki Byard

- Family Man (Muse, 1978)

With Composer's Workshop Ensemble

- Composer's Workshop Ensemble (Strata-East, 1972)
- We've Been Around (Strata-East, 1974)

With Gil Evans

- The Gil Evans Orchestra Plays the Music of Jimi Hendrix (RCA, 1974)
- There Comes a Time (RCA, 1975)

With Art Farmer

- Homecoming (Mainstream, 1971)

With Benny Golson

- Tune In, Turn On (Verve, 1967)

With Billy Harper

- Capra Black (Strata-East, 1973)

With Julius Hemphill

- Flat-Out Jump Suite (Black Saint, 1980)
- Chile New York (Black Saint, 1998)
- The Boyé Multi-National Crusade for Harmony (New World, 2021)

With J. J. Johnson

- Goodies (RCA Victor, 1965)
- Broadway Express (RCA Victor, 1965)
- Betwixt & Between (A&M/CTI, 1969) with and Kai Winding

With Hubert Laws

- Wild Flower (Atlantic, 1972)

With Giuseppi Logan

- The Giuseppi Logan Quintet (Tompkins Square Records, 2010)

With Herbie Mann

- Our Mann Flute (Atlantic, 1966)

With Ken McIntyre

- Year of the Iron Sheep (United Artists, 1962)

With Van Morrison

- Astral Weeks (Warner Bros., 1968)

With M'Boom

- Re: Percussion (Strata-East, 1973)
- M'Boom (Columbia, 1979)
- Collage (Soul Note, 1984)
- To the Max! (Enja, 1990–91)
- Live at S.O.B.'s New York (Blue Moon, 1992)

With Jack McDuff

- A Change Is Gonna Come (Atlantic, 1966)

With Charles Mingus

- The Complete Town Hall Concert (Blue Note, 1962 [1994])

With Buddy Montgomery

- Ties of Love (Landmark, 1987)

With Jimmy Owens

- Jimmy Owens (A&M/Horizon, 1976)

With Jerome Richardson

- Groove Merchant (Verve, 1968)

With Sam Rivers

- Hues (Impulse!, 1973)
- Sizzle (Impulse!, 1975)

With Alan Silva

- H.Con.Res.57/Treasure Box (Eremite, 2003)

With Jimmy Smith

- Monster (Verve, 1965)

With Charles Tolliver

- Impact (Strata-East, 1975)

with Roy Campbell, Joe McPhee & William Parker

- Tribute to Albert Ayler Live at the Dynamo (Marge, 2009)

With Phil Upchurch

- Feeling Blue (Milestone, 1967)

With David S. Ware

- Shakti (AUM Fidelity, 2009)
- Onecept (AUM Fidelity, 2009)
- Live in New York, 2010 (AUM Fidelity, 2017)

With The Tony Williams Lifetime

- Ego (Polydor, 1971)

With Odean Pope

- Universal Sounds (Porter, 2011)

With Joseph Daley

- The Seven Deadly Sins (Jaro, 2011)
- The Seven Heavenly Virtues (Joda Music, 2013)
- REISSUE: The Seven Heavenly Virtues/The Seven Deadly Sins (JoDa Music, 2019)

With Blue Reality Quartet (Joe McPhee/ Michael Marcus/Jay Rosen)

- Blue Reality Quartet (Mahakala, 2021)
- Blue Reality Quartet "Ella's Island" (Mahakala, 2022)
