= The Coxcomb (album) =

Studio album by David Grubbs
- Released: 1999
- Recorded: June 1998
- Studio: Xtralab, Paris
- Genre: Folk rock
- Length: 32:42
- Label: Rectangle

David Grubbs chronology
| Apertura (1998) | The Coxcomb (1999) | The Spectrum Between (2000) |

Professional ratings
Review scores
| Source | Rating |
|---|---|
| AllMusic | 4/5 stars |

The Coxcomb is the third album by David Grubbs, released in 1999 through Rectangle. It is an adaptation of The Blue Hotel, a short story by Stephen Crane.

== Track listing ==
All tracks are written by David Grubbs.

| No. | Title | Length |
|---|---|---|
| 1. | "The Coxcomb" | 17:00 |
| 2. | "Aux Noctambules" | 15:42 |

== Personnel ==
Musicians

- Noël Akchoté – voice on "The Coxcomb"
- Sasha Andrès – cello and voice on "The Coxcomb"
- David Grubbs – guitar and voice on "The Coxcomb", organ on "Aux Noctambules"
- Thierry Madiot – bass trombone on "The Coxcomb"
- Didier Petit – cello and voice on "The Coxcomb"
- Stephen Prina – voice on "The Coxcomb"
- Yves Robert – trombone and voice on "The Coxcomb"
- Quentin Rollet – alto saxophone on "The Coxcomb"

Production and additional personnel

- David Mascunan – mastering
- Albert Oehlen – cover art
