= Ethnic Stew and Brew =

Studio album by Roy Campbell
- Released: 2001
- Recorded: October 11 & 12, 2000
- Genre: Jazz
- Length: 63:26
- Label: Delmark
- Producer: Steve Wagner

Roy Campbell chronology
Ancestral Homeland (1998)	Ethnic Stew and Brew (2001)	It's Krunch Time (2001)

Ethnic Stew and Brew is the fifth album by American jazz trumpeter Roy Campbell, the third by Pyramid Trio, which also included bassist William Parker and new member Hamid Drake replacing former drummer Zen Matsuura. The album was recorded in 2000 and released on the Delmark label.

== Music ==
According to Campbell, "Pyramid Trio is about world music with a touch of jazz". Some pieces shows African influences, but "Impressions of Yokohama", where Parker plays shakuhachi (a traditional Japanese flute), reveals a strong Asian feel. "Amadou Diallo" was inspired by the tragic shooting of a Guinean immigrant in New York in 1999, ending with a rapid burst of notes replicating the 41 gunshots.

== Reception ==
Professional ratings
Review scores
Source	Rating
AllMusic	4/5 stars
The Penguin Guide to Jazz	3.5/4 stars

The AllMusic review by Alex Henderson states, "Ethnic Stew and Brew isn't Campbell's most essential album, but it is still an exciting illustration of his talents as both a composer and a soloist". The Penguin Guide to Jazz states that Campbell "is calling on more than a tradition here, not just ancient black-music threads, but the developed avant garde of the past 30-odd years."

The album ranked number 3 on JazzTimes' Top 50 CDs of the year.

== Track listing ==
All compositions by Roy Campbell

1. "Tazz's Dilemma" - 9:10
2. "Malcolm, Martin and Mandela" - 11:19
3. "Imhotep"- 9:13
4. "Impressions of Yokohama" - 8:51
5. "Ethnic Stew and Brew" - 4:35
6. "Heavenly Ascending" - 7:41
7. "Amadou Diallo" - 12:37

== Personnel ==
- Roy Campbell - trumpet, flugelhorn, pocket trumpet, percussion
- William Parker - bass, percussion, shakuhachi flute
- Hamid Drake - drums, percussion
