= Test (group) =

Free jazz cooperative

Test is a free jazz cooperative.

== Members ==
- Tom Bruno: (drums)
- Daniel Carter: (saxophones)
- Matt Heyner: (double bass)
- Sabir Mateen: (saxophones)

== Discography ==
- Ahead! (Eremite, 1998)
- Test (AUM Fidelity, 1999)
- Live (Eremite, 2000)
- Always Coming from the Love Side (Eremite, 2016)
- Test and Roy Campbell (577 Records, 2020)
