= Rashid Bakr (musician) =

American free jazz drummer (born 1943)

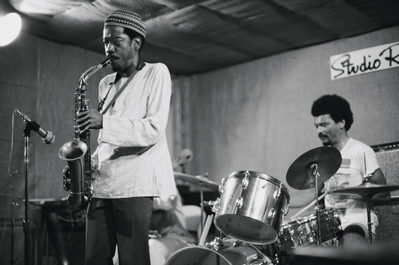
- Jemeel Moondoc (left) with Rashid Bakr at Studio Rivbea! July 1976

Background information
- Born: Charles Downs; October 3, 1943 (age 82); Chicago, Illinois, U.S.
- Genres: Free jazz
- Occupation: Musician
- Instrument: Drums
- Member of: Other Dimensions In Music

Rashid Bakr (born Charles Downs on October 3, 1943) is an American free jazz drummer.

== Career ==
During the 1970s, he was active in the New York City loft jazz scene, performing at venues such as Rashied Ali's "Ali's Alley" and Sam Rivers' "Studio Rivbea". He was a member of Ensemble Muntu with Jemeel Moondoc, among others.

In 1976, Bakr performed in a production of Adrienne Kennedy's A Rat's Mass directed by Cecil Taylor at La MaMa Experimental Theatre Club in the East Village of Manhattan. Musicians Jimmy Lyons, Andy Bey, Karen Borca, David S. Ware, and Raphe Malik also performed in the production. Taylor's production combined the original script with a chorus of orchestrated voices used as instruments. Bakr continued to perform with Taylor into the 1980s, appearing on his albums The Eighth and Winged Serpent (Sliding Quadrants).

Bakr is a member of Other Dimensions in Music with Roy Campbell, Daniel Carter, and William Parker.

== Discography ==
=== As leader or co-leader ===
- Seeing New York From the Ear (Cadence, 1996) with Frode Gjerstad and William Parker
- Cooler Suite (GROB, 2003) with Thomas Borgmann, Peter Brötzmann, and William Parker

With the Flow Trio (Louis Belogenis, Joe Morris, Bakr listed as Charles Downs)

- Rejuvenation (ESP-Disk, 2009)
- Set Theory: Live At The Stone (Ayler Records, 2011)
- Winter Garden (ESP-Disk, 2021) with Joe McPhee

=== As sideman ===
With Billy Bang

- New York Collage (Anima, 1978)
- Black Man's Blues (NoBusiness, 2011)

With John Bickerton

- Open Music (CIMP, 2000)
- Shadow Boxes (Leo Lab, 2000)

With Arthur Doyle

- Live At the Alterknit (Qbico, 2008)

With Frode Gjerstad

- A Sound Sight (Ayler, 2007)

With Sabir Mateen

- The Sabir Mateen Jubilee Ensemble (Not Two, 2013)

With Joe McPhee

- Ticonderoga (Clean Feed, 2015)

With Jemeel Moondoc

- First Feeding (Muntu, 1977)
- The Evening of the Blue Men (Muntu, 1979)
- New York Live! (Cadence Jazz, 1981)
- The Intrepid Live in Poland (Poljazz, 1981)
- Muntu Recordings (NoBusiness, 2009)

With Ras Moshe

- Transcendence (KMB, 2007)

With Other Dimensions in Music

- Other Dimensions In Music (Silkheart, 1990)
- Now! (AUM Fidelity, 1998)
- Time Is of the Essence Is Beyond Time (AUM Fidelity, 2000)
- Kaiso Stories (Silkheart, 2011)

With William Parker

- Centering. Unreleased Early Recordings 1976–1987 (NoBusiness, 2012)

With Jamie Saft

- Atlas (Veal, 2020)
- Mountains (Veal, 2020)

With Glenn Spearman

- First and Last (Eremite, 1999)

With Cecil Taylor

- The Eighth (Hat Hut, 1986)
- Winged Serpent (Sliding Quadrants) (Soul Note, 1985)
- Always a Pleasure (FMP, 1996)
