= Emergence (Whit Dickey album) =

Studio album by Whit Dickey
- Released: 2009
- Recorded: February 24, 2009
- Studio: Park West Studios, New York City
- Genre: Jazz
- Length: 59:24
- Label: Not Two
- Producer: Whit Dickey, Marek Winiarski

Whit Dickey chronology
Sacred Ground (2006)	Emergence (2009)	Fierce Silence (2016)

Emergence is an album by American jazz drummer Whit Dickey recorded in 2009 and released on the Polish Not Two label. It features eight collective improvisations by a trio which includes Japanese pianist Eri Yamamoto and multi-instrumentalist Daniel Carter. Yamamoto and Carter played together previously on Duologue, a collection of duets by the pianist.

== Reception ==
The All About Jazz by John Sharpe states "It is Yamamoto who provides the best entry point, as she is not afraid to inject structure into the understated free form with her strong rhythmic foundation and bluesy intonation... Dickey is a master of multiple and implied rhythms, shifting in and out of time to a point that a dreamlike quality pervades the music, compounded by his richly detailed touches, making full use of space for dramatic effect."

== Track listing ==
All compositions by Carter/Yamamoto/Dickey

1. "Conversation" – 6:03
2. "Get Up" – 8:40
3. "Mobile" – 7:36
4. "Convection" – 6:02
5. "Rocker" – 5:54
6. "Twirls" – 10:13
7. "Last Taste" – 7:49
8. "Plum Blossom" – 7:07

== Personnel ==
- Daniel Carter – reeds, trumpet, flute
- Eri Yamamoto – piano
- Whit Dickey – drums
