= Two Soundtracks for Angela Bulloch =

Two Soundtracks For Angela Bulloch

EP by David Grubbs
- Released: 2005
- Recorded: 2002, 2004, 2005
- Genre: Improvisational
- Length: 21:26
- Label: Semishigure

David Grubbs chronology
Thiefth	Two Soundtracks For Angela Bulloch

Professional ratings
Review scores
Source	Rating
Dusted Reviews	

Two Soundtracks for Angela Bulloch is an EP by the American musician David Grubbs which was written to accompany the artwork of Angela Bulloch.

== Track listing ==
1. "Z Point" – 8:14
2. "Horizontal Technicolour" – 13:12
