= Now! (Other Dimensions In Music album) =

Studio album by Other Dimensions in Music
- Released: 1998
- Recorded: March 19, 1997
- Studio: Sound On Sound, New York
- Genre: Jazz
- Length: 73:29
- Label: AUM Fidelity
- Producer: Other Dimensions In Music, Steven Joerg

Other Dimensions In Music chronology
Other Dimensions In Music (1990)	Now! (1998)	Time Is of the Essence Is Beyond Time (2000)

Now! is the second album by the free jazz collective quartet Other Dimensions in Music, composed of trumpeter Roy Campbell, multi-instrumentalist Daniel Carter, bassist William Parker and drummer Rashid Bakr. It was recorded in studio in 1997 and released on the AUM Fidelity label. The music of the quartet is fully improvised.

== Reception ==
Professional ratings
Review scores
Source	Rating
AllMusic	4/5 stars
The Penguin Guide to Jazz	3/4 stars

In his review for AllMusic, Tom Schulte states: "Fascinating and richly woven, Now! is a classic mosaic of the current state of the N.Y.C. free jazz scene." The JazzTimes review by Bill Milkowski thought that "ODIM is onto a group dynamic that is thoughtful, full of nuance and passion, sometimes provocative, sometimes poignant but never predictable."

== Track listing ==
All compositions by Other Dimensions In Music

1. "For the Glass Tear / After Evening's Orange" - 33:00
2. "Tears for the Boy Wonder (For Winston Marsalis)" - 5:26
3. "Blue Expanded"- 12:16
4. "Whispers & Cries of Change (For Departed Musical Warriors)" - 6:04
5. "Dawm"- 8:23
6. "Steve's Festive Visions Revisited" - 8:20

== Personnel ==
- Daniel Carter - alto sax, tenor sax, flute, trumpet
- Roy Campbell - trumpet, flugelhorn, pocket trumpet
- William Parker - bass
- Rashid Bakr - drums
