= Rectangle (label) =

- Founded: 1994
- Founder: Noël Akchoté; Quentin Rollet
- Distributor(s): Believe Digital
- Genre: Jazz
- Country of origin: France
- Location: Paris, France
- Official website: rectangle-records.bandcamp.com

Rectangle is a French independent record label established in Paris by Quentin Rollet and Noël Akchoté in 1994. It started specializing in vinyl releases, and moved to CD at the end of the 90's. After a long break it relaunched on MP3 format in 2011.

The label covers a vast range of styles such as jazz, free jazz, improvisation, chanson, electronica, post-rock, and spoken word.

Among the artists published are Derek Bailey, David Grubbs, Fred Frith, Eugene Chadbourne, Taku Sugimoto, Noël Akchoté; turntablists eRikm, Otomo Yoshihide, Martin Tétreault; saxophonists Lol Coxhill, Daunik Lazro, Quentin Rollet, the organ player Charlie O., the performer Jean-Louis Costes, singers such as Red, Philippe Katerine, Sasha Andres, Phil Minton, Fred Poulet, Justus Köhncke; the filmmakers John B. Root, Jean-Marie Straub and Danièle Huillet, the bassist Joëlle Léandre, as well as the sound and sampling artists Xavier Garcia, Andrew Sharpley, SebastiAn, the actresses Irène Jacob, Anna Karina, or visual artists such as Pakito Bolino, Hendrik Hegray, Albert Oehlen and Stephen Prina.

== Selected discography ==
=== Vinyl releases ===
- Rec-AA - David Grubbs, The Coxcomb / Aux Noctambules (12") Rectangle 1999
- Rec-AB- Various, Orléans Orléans, (Tribute to Albert Ayler, 10") Rectangle 1999
- Rec-BA - Derek Bailey & Ben Watson, 1/28 Silverfish Macronix (7") Rectangle 1993
- Rec-E - Eugene Chadbourne, The Acquaduct (LP) Rectangle 1996
- Rec-ESH123 - Jean-Marie Straub & Danièle Huillet with Thierry Jousse, Entretiens (3 x LP) Rectangle 1998
- Rec-F - Derek Bailey & Noël Akchoté, Close To The Kitchen (LP) Rectangle 1996
- Rec-G- Jean-Louis Costes, Vivre Encore (7")Rectangle 1996
- Rec-H - Noël Akchoté, Picture(s) (LP, S/Sided) Rectangle 1995
- Rec-K - Fred Frith & Noël Akchoté, Réel (10") Rectangle 1996
- REC L - Derek Bailey & Eugene Chadbourne, Tout For Tea! (10") Rectangle 1995
- Rec-M - Workshop De Lyon, Fondus (LP) Rectangle 1997
- Rec-N - Lol Coxhill, Phil Minton & Noël Akchoté, Xmas Songs (7") Rectangle 1998
- Rec-PD - Charlie O., Proud To Be There (7") Rectangle 1997
- Rec-PS- Jean-François Pauvros, ...Mon Homme (7") Rectangle 1999
- Rec-Q1 - Quentin Rollet, Aka Doug (7") Rectangle 1994
- Rec-RREM - eRikm, Re/Cycling Rectangle (7") Rectangle 1999
- Rec-RRXG2- Xavier Garcia, Re/Cycling Rectangle (7") Rectangle 1999
- Rec-RRYO - Otomo Yoshihide, Re/cycling Rectangle (7") Rectangle 2000
- Rec-U - Eugene Chadbourne, To Doug (7") Rectangle 2000

=== CD ===
- Rec-AC2 - David Grubbs, Thirty Minute Raven (CD, Digipack) Rectangle 2001
- Rec-AL2 - Noël Akchoté, Perpetual Joseph (CD) Rectangle2002
- Rec-AM2 - Noël Akchoté, Simple Joseph (CD) Rectangle2001
- Rec-AN - Noël Akchoté, Alike Joseph (CD) Rectangle2000
- Rec-BB2 - Red, Felk (CD) Rectangle 2000
- Rec-BC2 - Red, Songs From A Room (CD ) Rectangle 2001
- Rec-BO4 - Katerine, with Margot Abascal, Anna Karina, etc., Nom De Code: Sacha (CD) Rectangle 2002
- Rec-CC2VOL1 - Lee Scratch Perry, The Compiler Vol. 1 (CD) Rectangle 2001
- Rec-E2 - Eugene Chadbourne, The Acquaduct (CD) Rectangle 1996
- Rec-ESH45 - Jean-Marie Straub & Danièle Huillet with Thierry Jousse, Entretiens (2 x CD) Rectangle 1999
- Rec-ELLE2 - Joëlle Léandre, Dire Du Dire (entretiens, CD) Rectangle 2000
- Rec-MCA - Phil Minton, Lol Coxhill et Noël Akchoté, My Chelsea (CD)Rectangle 1997
- REC-S2- Derek Bailey, Pat Thomas & Steve Noble, And (CD), Rectangle 1999
- Rec-UEE1 - Quentin Rollet, eRikm, Akosh Szelevényi et Charlie O., MOSQ (CD) Rectangle 2001
- Rec-V2 - Jean-Louis Costes, Nik Ta Race (CD) Rectangle 2000

=== MP3 ===
- Rec-AO2 - Noël Akchoté, Alive Joseph (MP3, Mini-Album) Rectangle 2011
- Rec-AP2 - Noël Akchoté, Solo Live in NYC (1998) (MP3, EP) Rectangle 2011
- Rec-BO5 - John B. Root & Noël Akchoté, with Fred Poulet, Ally Mac Tyana, Elixir & French Beauty (MP3) Rectangle 2011
- Rec-CAS2 - Tom Cora, Noël Akchoté & Alfred Spirli, Paris 1997 (Live In) (MP3) Rectangle 2011
- Rec-DB201 - Derek Bailey, This Guitar (MP3) Rectangle 2011
- Rec-DB202- Derek Bailey, Words (MP3) Rectangle 2011
- Rec-NYC12- Quentin Rollet & Noël Akchoté, NYC 1+2 (MP3, AudioFilm) Rectangle 2011
- Rec-RRAS - Andrew Sharpley, Re/Cycling Rectangle (MP3, Single) Rectangle 2011
- Rec-RRMT - Martin Tétreault, Re/Cycling Rectangle (MP3, Single) Rectangle 2011
- Rec-V2S - Jean-Louis Costes & SebastiAn, Seule La Musique (MP3, Single) Rectangle 2011
- Rec-Y - Otomo Yoshihide & Taku Sugimoto, Untitled 1-4 (MP3, EP) Rectangle 2011
