= DNA (Matthew Shipp and William Parker album) =

Studio album by Matthew Shipp and William Parker
- Released: 1999
- Recorded: January 6, 1999
- Studio: Seltzer Sound, New York City
- Genre: Jazz
- Length: 47:33
- Label: Thirsty Ear

Matthew Shipp chronology
Strata (1998)	DNA (1999)	Magnetism (1999)

DNA is an album by the American jazz pianist Matthew Shipp with bassist William Parker, which was recorded in 1999 and released on Thirsty Ear. It was their second duo recording; the first was Zo. The album includes two traditional pieces, "When Johnny Comes Marching Home" and "Amazing Grace".

== Reception ==
Professional ratings
Review scores
Source	Rating
AllMusic	4/5 stars
The Penguin Guide to Jazz Recordings	3/4 stars
(The New) Rolling Stone Album Guide	3.5/5 stars

In his review for AllMusic, Scott Yanow states: "Shipp's dense chords and atonal playing will remind some listeners of Cecil Taylor although there is a lyricism in his music (and an occasional use of space) that is very much his own."

== Track listing ==
All compositions by Matthew Shipp except as indicated

1. "When Johnny Comes Marching Home" (Traditional) – 4:04
2. "Cell Sequence" – 7:03
3. "Genetic Alphabet" – 12:45
4. "DNA" – 5:26
5. "Orbit" – 4:31
6. "Mr. Chromosome" – 11:42
7. "Amazing Grace" (Traditional) – 2:02

== Personnel ==
- Matthew Shipp – piano
- William Parker – bass
