= Banana Cabbage, Potato Lettuce, Onion Orange =

Studio album by David Grubbs
- Released: March 14, 1997
- Genre: Folk rock
- Length: 31:40
- Label: Table of the Elements
- Producer: Jim O'Rourke

David Grubbs chronology
Banana Cabbage, Potato Lettuce, Onion Orange (1997)	The Thicket (1998)

Professional ratings
Review scores
Source	Rating
AllMusic	2/5 stars

Banana Cabbage, Potato Lettuce, Onion Orange is the debut album of David Grubbs, released on March 14, 1997, through Table of the Elements.

== Track listing ==
All music is composed by David Grubbs.

No.	Title	Length
1.	"Banana Cabbage"	3:14
2.	"Potato Lettuce"	12:23
3.	"Onion Orange"	16:03

== Personnel ==
- Bundy K. Brown – engineering
- David Grubbs – guitar
- Jim O'Rourke – production, engineering, recording
- Dan Osborn – cover art, design
