= Roy Campbell Jr. =

American trumpeter (1952–2014)

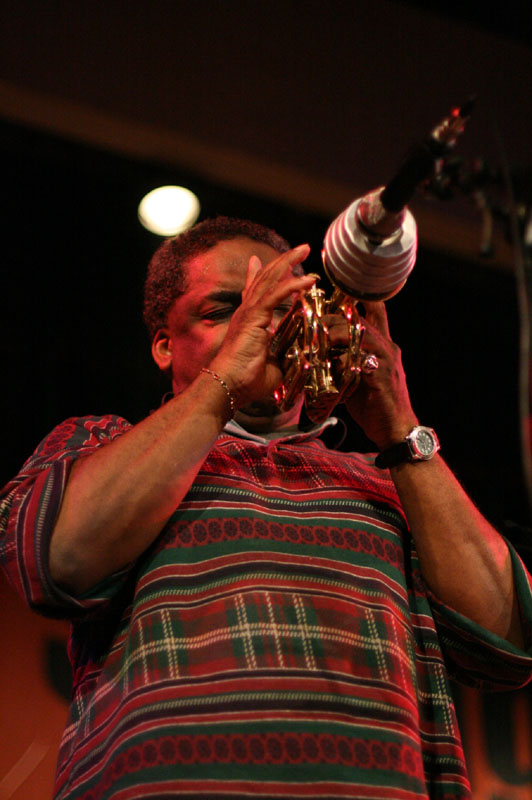
- Photo by Bogdan Dimitriu

Background information
- Birth name: Roy Sinclair Campbell Jr.
- Born: September 29, 1952; Los Angeles, California, U.S.
- Died: January 9, 2014 (aged 61); The Bronx, New York, U.S.
- Genres: Free jazz, funk, R&B
- Occupation: Musician
- Instrument: Trumpet
- Formerly of: Yusef Lateef, Woody Shaw, Jemeel Moondoc, Ellen Christi, Cecil Taylor, David Murray, Matthew Shipp, Billy Bang, Carlos Garnett, William Parker,

Roy Sinclair Campbell Jr. (September 29, 1952 – January 9, 2014) was an American trumpeter frequently linked to free jazz, although he also performed rhythm and blues and funk during his career.

== Biography ==
Born in Los Angeles, California, in 1952, Campbell was raised in New York City. At the age of fifteen, he began learning to play trumpet and soon studied at the Jazz Mobile program along with Kenny Dorham, Lee Morgan and Joe Newman. Throughout the 1960s, still unacquainted with the avant-garde movement, Campbell performed in the big bands of the Manhattan Community College. From the 1970s onwards, he performed primarily within the context of free jazz, spending some of this period studying with Yusef Lateef. Campbell composed the film music for the documentary Survival in New York (1989) by Rosa von Praunheim.

In the early 1990s, Campbell moved to the Netherlands and performed regularly with Klaas Hekman and Don Cherry. In addition to leading his own groups, he performed with Yo La Tengo, William Parker, Peter Brötzmann, Matthew Shipp, and other improvisors. Upon returning to the United States he began leading his group Other Dimensions In Music and also formed the Pyramid Trio, a pianoless trio formed with William Parker.

He died in January 2014 of hypertensive atherosclerotic cardiovascular disease at the age of 61.

== Discography ==
=== As leader ===
- New Kingdom (Delmark, 1992)
- La Tierra del Fuego (Delmark, 1994)
- Communion (Silkheart, 1995)
- Ancestral Homeland (No More, 1998)
- Ethnic Stew and Brew (Delmark, 2001)
- It's Krunch Time (Thirsty Ear, 2001)
- Akhenaten Suite (Aum Fidelity, 2008)

=== As co-leader ===
with Other Dimensions in Music

- Other Dimensions In Music (Silkheart, 1990)
- Now! (Aum Fidelity, 1998)
- Time Is of the Essence Is Beyond Time (Aum Fidelity, 2000)
- Live at the Sunset (Marge, 2007)
- Kaiso Stories (Silkheart, 2011)

with The Nu Band (Roy Campbell Jr., Mark Whitecage, Joe Fonda, Lou Grassi)

- Live at the Bop Shop (Clean Feed, 2001)
- Live (Konnex, 2005)
- The Dope and the Ghost (Not Two, 2007)
- Lower East Side Blues (Porter, 2009)
- Live in Paris (NoBusiness, 2010)
- Relentlessness Live at the Sunset (Marge, 2011)

with Joe McPhee, William Parker & Warren Smith

- Tribute to Albert Ayler Live at the Dynamo (Marge, 2009)

=== As sideman ===
with Billy Bang

- Live at Carlos 1 (Soul Note, 1986)

with Peter Brötzmann's Die Like a Dog Quartet

- From Valley to Valley (Eremite, 1998)

with Peter Brötzmann Tentet + 2

- Short Visit to Nowhere (Okkadisk, 2002)
- Broken English (Okkadisk, 2002)

with Rob Brown

- Jumping Off the Page (No More, 2000)
- The Big Picture (Marge, 2004)

with Whit Dickey

- Coalescence (Clean Feed, 2004)
- In a Heartbeat (Clean Feed, 2005)
- Sacred Ground (Clean Feed, 2006)

with El-P

- High Water (Thirsty Ear, 2004)

with Ehran Elisha

- Sweet Empathy (Cadence, 1995)
- The Kicker (CIMP, 1998)
- Lowe Down Suite (CIMP, 1999)

with Exuberance

- The Other Shore (Boxholder, 2003)
- Live at Vision Festival (Ayler, 2004)

with Garrison Fewell

- Variable Density Sound Orchestra (Creative Nation Music, 2009)

with Yuko Fujiyama

- Re-entry (CIMP, 2001)

with Dennis Gonzalez

- Nile River Suite (Daagnim, 2004)

with Burton Greene

- Isms Out (CIMP, 2004)

with William Hooker Trio with Dave Soldier

- Heart of the Sun (Engine Records, 2013)

with Khan Jamal

- Balafon Dance (CIMP, 2002)

with Adam Lane

- Blue Spirit Band (CIMP, 2013)
- Oh Freedom (CIMP, 2013)

with Steve Lehman

- Structural Fire (CIMP, 2001)
- Camouflage (CIMP, 2002)

with Maneri Ensemble

- Going to Church (Aum Fidelity, 2002)

with Jemeel Moondoc

- The Evening of the Blue Men (Muntu, 1979)
- New York Live! (Cadence, 1981)
- The Intrepid Live in Poland (Poljazz, 1981)
- The Athens Concert (Praxis, 1982)
- Konstanze's Delight (Soul Note, 1983)
- Spirit House (Eremite, 2001)
- Live in Paris (Cadence, 2003)
- Live at the Vision Festival (Ayler, 2003)
- Muntu Recordings (NoBusiness, 2009)
- The Zookeeper's House (Relative Pitch, 2014)

with New Atlantis Octet

- Unto the Sun (Not Two. 2013)

with Kevin Norton

- The Dream Catcher (CIMP, 2003)

with William Parker

- Flowers Grow in my Room (Centering, 1994)
- Sunrise in the Tone World (AUM Fidelity, 1997)
- Mayor of Punkville (AUM Fidelity, 2000)
- Raincoat in the River (Eremite, 2001)
- Spontaneous (Splasc(H), 2002)
- Mass for the Healing of the World (Black Saint, 2003)
- Fractured Dimensions (FMP, 2003)
- For Percy Heath (Victo, 2006)
- Essence of Ellington (Centering, 2012)

with Marc Ribot

- Spiritual Unity (Pi recordings, 2005)

with Saheb Sarbib

- Live at the Public Theatre (Cadence, 1981)
- Aisha (Cadence, 1981)

with Matthew Shipp

- Strata (hatOLOGY, 1998)
- Pastoral Composure (Thirsty Ear, 2000)

with Alan Silva

- Alan Silva & the Sound Visions Orchestra (Eremite, 2001)
- H.Con.Res.57/Treasure Box (Eremite, 2003)

with Stone Quartet

- DMG @ The Stone Volume 1: December 22, 2006 (DMG/ARC, 2008)
- Live at Vision Festival (Ayler, 2011)

with Steve Swell

- Suite for Players, Listeners and Other Dreamers (CIMP, 2003)
- News from the Mystic Auricle (Not Two, 2008)

with Charles Tyler

- Live at Sweet Basil vol. 1 & 2 (1984) (Bleu Regard, 2006)

with Yo La Tengo

- Summer Sun (Matador, 2003)
