= It's Krunch Time =

Studio album by Roy Campbell
- Released: 2001
- Recorded: April 8, 2001
- Studio: Strobe-Light, New York
- Genre: Jazz
- Length: 42:40
- Label: Thirsty Ear
- Producer: Matthew Shipp

Roy Campbell chronology
Ethnic Stew and Brew (2001)	It's Krunch Time (2001)	Akhenaten Suite (2008)

It's Krunch Time is the sixth album by American jazz trumpeter Roy Campbell, recorded and released in 2001 on Thirsty Ear's Blue Series, a line of recordings under the artistic direction of pianist Matthew Shipp. The album includes a version of Thelonious Monk composition "Bemsha Swing" and a solo trumpet rendition of the US national anthem "Star Spangled Banner". "Ode for Mr. DC" is dedicated to Denis Charles.

== Reception ==
Professional ratings
Review scores
Source	Rating
AllMusic	4/5 stars
The Penguin Guide to Jazz	3/4 stars

The AllMusic review by David R. Adler states that Campbell "takes his time developing passionate rubato statements on tracks like 'Tenderness of Spring', 'The Opening', and 'New Groes for the Millennium', while "Jamal shines, with his slightly raspy sound, on 'Khanducting'."

== Track listing ==
All compositions by Roy Campbell except as indicated

1. "Tenderness of Spring" - 6:37
2. "It's Krunch Time" - 5:34
3. "Bemsha Swing" (Thelonious Monk) - 4:56
4. "New Groes for the New Millenium"- 4:33
5. "Ode for Mr. DC"- 5:39
6. "Klanducting" - 4:02
7. "The Opening" - 7:56
8. "Star Spangled Banner" (Traditional) - 3:23

== Personnel ==
- Roy Campbell - trumpet
- Khan Jamal - vibraphone
- Wilber Morris - bass
- Guillermo E. Brown - drums
