= La Tierra del Fuego =

Studio album by Roy Campbell
- Released: 1994
- Recorded: December 11 & 12, 1993
- Genre: Jazz
- Length: 62:07
- Label: Delmark
- Producer: Steve Wagner

Roy Campbell chronology
| New Kingdom (1995) | La Tierra del Fuego (1994) | Communion (1995) |

La Tierra del Fuego is the second album by American jazz trumpeter Roy Campbell, recorded in 1993 and released on the Delmark label.

== Music ==
The album reflects Roy's interest in World music. "I wanted more of a Latin and Third World sound than I had on New Kingdom" says Campbell. The title cut is a suite in three sections dedicate to the innovative musicians of the '60s, John Coltrane, Sun Ra, Cecil Taylor, Eric Dolphy, among others. On the tune "Booker's Lament" Roy pays homage to trumpeter Booker Little. Campbell had been playing trumpet by six years before he first heard Little perform on Max Roach's Deeds, Not Words. "He had textures, colors and voicings that were revolutionary for the '60s" says Campbell, citing Little's Out Front as a seminal trumpet recording.

== Reception ==
Professional ratings
Review scores
| Source | Rating |
|---|---|
| AllMusic | 4/5 stars |
| The Penguin Guide to Jazz | 3/4 stars |

Alex Henderson, in his review for AllMusic claims "In Spanish, La Tierra del Fuego means The Land of Fire, and Campbell brings plenty of fire and passion to this consistently inspired CD." The Penguin Guide to Jazz states that "is an intermittenly exciting stew of traditions and new ideas, with nods to Booker Little and various threads of Afro-Cuban jazz and the hottest modal bands of the 1960s."

== Track listing ==
All compositions by Roy Campbell except as indicated

1. "Jahne's Waltz" - 5:49
2. "Booker's Lament" - 8:35
3. "Straight On Up Straight On Down"- 6:14
4. "Charmaine" - 8:42
5. "La Tierra del Fuego Suite" - 17:18
6. "Losaida" - 10:04
7. "The Sermon" (Ricardo Strobert) - 5:25

== Personnel ==
- Roy Campbell - trumpet, flugelhorn
- Zane Massey - tenor sax
- Ricardo Strobert - alto sax, flute
- Rahn Burton - piano
- Hideji Tannaka - bass
- Reggie Nicholson - drums
- Talik Abdullah - percussion
- Klaas Hekman - bass sax on 2 & 6
- Alex Lodico - trombone on 5 & 6
