= Kaiso Stories =

Studio album by Other Dimensions In Music
- Released: 2011
- Recorded: September 8, 2010
- Studio: ParkWest Studios, New York City
- Genre: Jazz
- Length: 74:27
- Label: Silkheart
- Producer: Fay Victor

Other Dimensions In Music chronology
Live at the Sunset (2007)	Kaiso Stories (2011)

Kaiso Stories is an album by free jazz collective quartet Other Dimensions In Music featuring vocalist Fay Victor, which was recorded in 2010 and released on the Swedish Silkheart label. The album is a collection of improvised pieces with classic Calypso lyrics from Trinidad and Tobago. Kaiso is the precursor to the modern Calypso.

== Reception ==
Professional ratings
Review scores
Source	Rating
The Free Jazz Collective	5/5 stars

The JazzTimes review by Lloyd Sachs notes that Fay Victor "reawakens cultural history, addressing political and religious topics as well as boy-girl and life-and-death themes with manic chants, raspy shouts and patois-inflected spoken recitations."

Stanley Zappa of The Free Jazz Collective wrote: "In a civilized world with a forward thinking music industry and curious listenership, in a culture a where Art was as valued as everyone likes to say it is, Kaiso Stories would be a cross-over sensation, charting for months and finding a grateful audience that no Improvised music had found before. Until such time, it is one for the initiated to treasure."

The New York City Jazz Record included the album on their "Best of 2011 / Albums of the Year" list.

== Track listing ==
1. "Maryanne Revisited" – 13:33
2. "Three Friends Advised" – 15:24
3. "Kitch Goes Home" – 7:36
4. "Saltfish Refried" – 10:46
5. "John Gilman Wants Tobacco" – 1:57
6. "An Open Letter" – 10:02
7. "De Night A De Wake" – 6:45
8. "We Is We Trini" – 8:24

== Personnel ==
- Roy Campbell – trumpet, pocket trumpet, flugelhorn, flute, recorder, shepherd pipes, arghul, bird whistles, panpipes, bells
- Daniel Carter – alto sax, tenor sax, soprano sax, flute, trumpet, clarinet
- William Parker – bass, gembri, bass duduk, trombonium
- Charles Downs – drums, percussion
- Fay Victor – voice
