= Fierce Silence =

Studio album by Whit Dickey, Kirk Knuffke
- Released: 2016
- Recorded: October 14, 2015
- Studio: Park West, Brooklyn
- Genre: Jazz
- Length: 46:09
- Label: Clean Feed
- Producer: Whit Dickey

Whit Dickey chronology
Emergence (2009)	Fierce Silence (2016)	Vessel in Orbit (2017)

Fierce Silence is an album by American jazz drummer Whit Dickey featuring a collection of improvised duos with cornetist Kirk Knuffke. It was recorded in 2015 and released on the Portuguese Clean Feed label. Dickey refers to the album as a “collaborative meditation on the ballad form.”

== Reception ==
Professional ratings
Review scores
Source	Rating
Down Beat	3.5/5 stars

The Down Beat review by Martin Langley notes "The session marks a significantly restrained and subtle approach from Dickey, when compared with his more turbulent work with Matthew Shipp and David S. Ware."

The All About Jazz by John Sharpe says "Kirk Knuffke's discography suggests a penchant for duets... Certainly the cornetist thrives in such open situations, and Dickey makes for an intriguing partner across the ten concise improvisations." Another review by Mark Corroto states "Knuffke has made a solid reputation recording duets with musicians such as Karl Berger, Brian Drye, Michael Bisio, Jesse Stacken, and Mike Pride. This might be the best of the lot."

The Point of Departure review by Chris Robinson notes "The recording and mastering augments the warmness and immediacy of Knuffke and Dickey’s playing, as each detail is in full relief, from the depth and character of Dickey’s drums and cymbals to the individual shape of Knuffke’s every utterance."

== Track listing ==
All compositions by Whit Dickey and Kirk Knuffke.

1. "The Calling" – 5:38
2. "Fierce Silence" – 3:26
3. "Step Back" – 5:14
4. "Stalker" – 3:57
5. "Lodestar" – 4:31
6. "Quarry" – 3:14
7. "Bone" – 4:45
8. "Legba's Dance" – 5:12
9. "Leave It to the Wind" – 6:59
10. "Ashes" – 3:13

== Personnel ==
- Whit Dickey – drums
- Kirk Knuffke – cornet
