= Akhenaten Suite =

Live album by Roy Campbell
- Released: 2008
- Recorded: June 22, 2007
- Venue: Angel Orensanz Center, New York City
- Genre: Jazz
- Length: 57:14
- Label: AUM Fidelity

Roy Campbell chronology
It's Krunch Time (2001)	Akhenaten Suite (2008)

Akhenaten Suite is the seventh album by American jazz trumpeter Roy Campbell, an extended work inspired by Amenhotep IV, Pharaoh of the 18th dynasty of Egypt. The project was specially commissioned by Arts for Art, recorded live at the 2007 Vision Festival and released on AUM Fidelity.

== Reception ==
Professional ratings
Review scores
Source	Rating
AllMusic	3.5/5 stars

The AllMusic review by Michael G. Nastos states, "there is an overall good end result on this ambitious first outing of what could eventually wind up being his signature large composition".

The JazzTimes review by Forrest Dylan Bryant says, "Delivered in sour tones and rumbling polyrhythms, the suite juxtaposes creakily exotic ensemble passages with fiery solo flights. Campbell, leading his quintet through strange and bold soundscapes, balances a contemplative lyricism with concentrated bursts of blazing energy on trumpet and flugelhorn."

In his All About Jazz review, Mark Corroto says that "the music was written in the fashion of a Duke Ellington or Gil Evans suite" and claims "Roy Campbell has composed a fully formed suite, one which is worth repeated listening sessions."

== Track listing ==
All compositions by Roy Campbell

1. "Akhenaten (Amenophis, Amenhotep IV)" - 11:40
2. "Aten and Amarna" - 6:30
3. "Pharaoh's Revenge (Akhenaten) Intro Part 1"- 2:53
4. "Pharaoh's Revenge Part 1"- 10:24
5. "Pharaoh's Revenge (Tutankhamun) Intro Part 2" - 3:07
6. "Pharaoh's Revenge Part 2" - 10:31
7. "Sunset On The Nile" - 12:09

== Personnel ==
- Roy Campbell - trumpet, flugelhorn, argol, recorder
- Billy Bang - violin
- Bryan Carrott - vibraharp
- Hilliard Greene - bass
- Zen Matsuura - drums
