= Camoufleur =

Studio album by Gastr del Sol
- Released: February 23, 1998
- Studio: Steam Room (Chicago, Illinois); Solid Sound (Hoffman Estates, Illinois); Soma (Chicago, Illinois)
- Genre: Post-rock; chamber pop; ambient pop; folktronica
- Length: 40:47
- Label: Drag City

Gastr del Sol chronology
Upgrade & Afterlife (1996)	Camoufleur (1998)	We Have Dozens of Titles (2024)

Camoufleur is the fifth studio album by American post-rock band Gastr del Sol, released on February 23, 1998, on Drag City.

== Critical reception ==
Professional ratings
Review scores
Source	Rating
AllMusic	4.5/5 stars
Chicago Tribune	3.5/4 stars
Entertainment Weekly	A−
NME	7/10
Uncut	4/5 stars

Stephen Thomas Erlewine of AllMusic described Camoufleur as "a subdued, meditative affair, bringing together elements of folk, jazz, film music, and the avant-garde", which gradually "opens up, revealing layers of modest beauty". Entertainment Weekly critic Rob Brunner found that it showed Gastr del Sol's music continuing to become "less obtuse", praising the album as "their most listenable — and ambitious — work yet". Joshua Klein of The A.V. Club felt that its "move toward more standard song structures, while not a radical revamp, sounds fresh and enjoyable."

In 2018, Pitchfork placed Camoufleur at number 38 on its list of the 50 best albums of 1998. In an accompanying write-up, staff writer Marc Hogan described the album as "meticulous, introspective chamber-pop, unfurling a bit like Van Dyke Parks' work with Brian Wilson." Fact ranked it as the tenth best post-rock album of all time in a 2016 list.

== Track listing ==
No.	Title	Writer(s)	Length
1.	"The Seasons Reverse"	David Grubbs; Jim O'Rourke; Markus Popp	5:52
2.	"Blues Subtitled No Sense of Wonder"	Grubbs; O'Rourke; Popp	6:31
3.	"Black Horse"	Grubbs; O'Rourke	5:24
4.	"Each Dream Is an Example"	Grubbs; O'Rourke; Popp	5:41
5.	"Mouth Canyon"	Grubbs; O'Rourke	3:48
6.	"A Puff of Dew"	Grubbs; O'Rourke; Popp	6:20
7.	"Bauchredner"	Grubbs; O'Rourke	7:09

== Personnel ==
Credits adapted from liner notes.

- Jim O'Rourke – composition, performance, recording
- David Grubbs – composition, performance
- Markus Popp – composition, performance
- Edith Frost – vocals
- Stephen Prina – vocals
- Darin Gray – bass guitar
- John McEntire – drums, recording
- Steven Butters – steel drums
- Jeb Bishop – trombone
- Rob Mazurek – cornet
- Ken Vandermark – clarinet
- Jeremy Ronkin – French horn
- Julie Pomerleau – viola, violin
- Maureen Loughnane – violin
- Phil Bonnet – recording
- Markus Oehlen – artwork
