= New Kingdom (album) =

Studio album by Roy Campbell
- Released: 1992
- Recorded: October 6,7 & 8, 1991
- Genre: Jazz
- Length: 63:51
- Label: Delmark
- Producer: Steve Wagner

Roy Campbell chronology
New Kingdom (1992)	La Tierra del Fuego (1994)

New Kingdom is the debut album by American jazz trumpeter Roy Campbell, recorded in 1991 and released on the Delmark label. According to Roy, the title refers to "a whole generation of musicians who've been overlooked, musicians who use avant-garde techniques to develop stuff that refers to the tradition". "I Remember Lee" is dedicated to Roy's teacher Lee Morgan, while "For C.T.", composed by bassist William Parker, is a tribute to valve trombonist Clifford Thornton.

== Reception ==
Professional ratings
Review scores
Source	Rating
AllMusic	4.5/5 stars
The Penguin Guide to Jazz	3.5/4 stars

Alex Henderson, in his review for AllMusic, claims that "New Kingdom is Campbell's most essential album". The Penguin Guide to Jazz states that "the idea of New Kingdom is to create music that salutes the tradition and still pays heed to the avant-garde."

== Track listing ==
All compositions by Roy Campbell except as indicated

1. "I Remember Lee" - 10:33
2. "Angel" (William Parker) - 7:14
3. "Thanks to the Creator"- 6:18
4. "For C.T." (William Parker) - 10:26
5. "Mariescia" - 5:50
6. "Frankenstein & Igor" - 8:40
7. "Peace" (Zane Massey) - 3:46
8. "Spiritual Rejuvenation" - 11:04

== Personnel ==
- Roy Campbell - trumpet, flugelhorn
- Zane Massey - tenor sax on 1, 3 & 7
- Ricardo Strobert - alto sax, flute on 1, 3, 5 & 8
- Bryan Carrott - vibes on 1, 3, 5 & 8
- William Parker - bass
- Zen Matsuura - drums
