= In a Heartbeat (album) =

Studio album by Whit Dickey
- Released: 2005
- Recorded: February 24, 2004
- Studio: Avatar Studios, New York City
- Genre: Jazz
- Length: 61:47
- Label: Clean Feed

Whit Dickey chronology
Coalescence (2004)	In a Heartbeat (2005)	Sacred Ground (2006)

In a Heartbeat is an album by American jazz drummer Whit Dickey recorded in 2004 and released on the Portuguese Clean Feed label. For this record, Dickey expanded to a quintet consisting of the quartet with whom he recorded Big Top, with the addition of trumpeter Roy Campbell. The band plays four Dickey compositions and the Carla Bley original "Calls".

== Reception ==
Professional ratings
Review scores
Source	Rating
Allmusic	4/5 stars
The Penguin Guide to Jazz	3/4 stars

In his review for AllMusic, Scott Yanow states "The reason that this outing is a success is that the musicians are quite skilled, listen closely to each other, and make memorable music out of very open originals."

The Penguin Guide to Jazz observes that "Brown sounds as if he's looking for extremes which don't really suit him. But some passages offer gripping and wholly absorbing playing."

== Track listing ==
All compositions by Whit Dickey except as indicated

1. "Calls" (Carla Bley) – 11:17
2. "In a Heartbeat" – 15:29
3. "Peace Overture" – 9:48
4. "Dubya's Flying Lesson" – 13:11
5. "Democracy at Home" – 12:02

== Personnel ==
- Roy Campbell – trumpet, pocket trumpet, flugelhorn
- Rob Brown – alto sax
- Joe Morris – guitar
- Chris Lightcap – double bass
- Whit Dickey – drums
