= M'Boom (album) =

Studio album by Max Roach
- Released: 1979
- Recorded: July 25, 26 & 27, 1979
- Genre: Jazz
- Length: 48:01
- Label: Columbia
- Producer: Max Roach

Max Roach chronology
Birth and Rebirth (1978)	M'Boom (1979)	The Long March (1979)

M'Boom is an album by American jazz percussion ensemble M'Boom, led by Max Roach, recorded in 1979 for the Columbia label.

== Reception ==
Professional ratings
Review scores
Source	Rating
AllMusic	4.5/5 stars
Tom Hull	B+
The Rolling Stone Jazz Record Guide	4/5 stars

The Globe and Mail noted that "there are limits, as M'Boom proves, to the things that can be done (and none of them are harmonic in nature) with vibes, marimbas, steel drums, timpani, traps, and a few boxes of odds and ends."

The AllMusic review by Scott Yanow stated: "This is a particularly colorful set that is easily recommended not only to jazz and percussion fans but to followers of World music".

== Track listing ==
All compositions by Max Roach except as indicated

1. "Onomatopoeia" (Omar Clay) - 5:17
2. "Twinkle Toes" (Warren Smith) - 3:33
3. "Caravanserai" (Joe Chambers) - 4:01
4. "January V" - 3:24
5. "The Glorious Monster" - 6:46
6. "Rumble in the Jungle" (Clay) - 7:15
7. "Morning/Midday" (Clay, Smith) - 6:50
8. "Epistrophy" (Kenny Clarke, Thelonious Monk) - 4:28
9. "Kujichaglia" (Roy Brooks) - 6:27

- Recorded in New York City on July 25, 26 & 27, 1979

== Personnel ==
- Roy Brooks, Joe Chambers, Omar Clay, Fred King, Max Roach, Warren Smith, Freddie Waits – drums percussion, vibes, marimba, xylophone, timpani
- Ray Mantilla – conga, bongos, timpani, Latin percussion
- Kenyatte Abdur-Rahman – percussion, bells
