= Re: Percussion =

Studio album by M'Boom
- Released: 1973
- Recorded: August 25, 1973
- Genre: Jazz
- Length: 32:36
- Label: Strata-East
- Producer: M'Boom

Max Roach chronology
Lift Every Voice and Sing (1972)	Re: Percussion (1973)	Force: Sweet Mao - Suid Africa '76 (1976)

Re: Percussion is the debut album by American jazz percussion ensemble M'Boom recorded in 1973 for the Strata-East label.

Another recording of the same name, with two compositions by Joe Chambers, was released on Baystate.

== Reception ==
The Allmusic review by Scott Yanow awarded the album 4 and a half stars, stating, "The colorful sounds are full of surprises, and the music is both consistently stimulating and quite accessible".

Professional ratings
Review scores
Source	Rating
Allmusic	4.5/5 stars

== Track listing ==
1. "Morning, Noon, Midday" (Omar Clay, Warren Smith) - 5:44
2. "Attention - Call & Response" (Richard "Pablo" Landrum) - 0:47
3. "Jihad Es Mort" (Joe Chambers) - 8:15
4. "Elements of a Storm / Thunder & Wind" (Warren Smith) - 2:00
5. "Inner Passion" (Freddie Waits) - 4:04
6. "Heaven Sent" (Roy Brooks) - 5:08
7. "Onamotapoeia" (Omar Clay) - 6:38

- Recorded on August 25, 1973

== Personnel ==
- Roy Brooks, Joe Chambers, Omar Clay, Max Roach, Warren Smith, Freddie Waits - drums, percussion, vibes, marimba, xylophone
- Richard "Pablo" Landrum - conga, bongos
