= The Spectrum Between =

Studio album by David Grubbs
- Released: July 10, 2000
- Recorded: September 1999–March 2000
- Studio: Rare Book Room, Brooklyn, New York
- Genre: Folk rock
- Length: 36:01
- Label: Drag City

David Grubbs chronology
The Coxcomb (1999)	The Spectrum Between (2000)	Thirty Minute Raven (2001)

Professional ratings
Review scores
Source	Rating
AllMusic	4/5 stars
Alternative Press	4/5 stars
The Encyclopedia of Popular Music	4/5 stars
Pitchfork	7.9/10
Spin	3/5 stars

The Spectrum Between is the fourth album by David Grubbs, released in 2000 through Drag City.

== Track listing ==
All tracks are written by David Grubbs.

No.	Title	Length
1.	"Seagull and Eagull"	2:20
2.	"Whirlweek"	4:35
3.	"Stanwell Perpetual"	3:29
4.	"Gloriette"	6:02
5.	"A Shiver in the Timber"	3:34
6.	"Show Me Who to Love"	4:10
7.	"Pink Rambler"	3:59
8.	"Preface"	4:18
9.	"Two Shades of Green"	3:34

== Personnel ==
Musicians

- Noël Akchoté – guitar on "Seagull and Eagull", "Whirlweek" and "Gloriette"
- Dan Brown – drums, percussion
- Daniel Carter – trumpet on "Stanwell Perpetual", "Preface" and "Two Shades of Green"
- David Grubbs – guitar
- Mats Gustafsson – saxophone on "Stanwell Perpetual" and "Gloriette"
- John McEntire – drums, percussion
- Charlie O. – organ on "Pink Rambler" and "Preface"
- Quentin Rollet – saxophone on "Pink Rambler"

Production and additional personnel

- Cosima von Bonin – cover art
- Alan Douches – mastering
- Justus Köhnke – cover art
- Nicolas Vernhes – recording
