= Other Dimensions in Music (album) =

Studio album by Other Dimensions in Music
- Released: 1990
- Recorded: April 24 & 25, 1989
- Studio: Sound On Sound Recording, New York
- Genre: Jazz
- Length: 38:25 (LP); 70:20 (CD)
- Label: Silkheart
- Producer: Daniel Carter, Roy Campbell, William Parker, Rashid Bakr

Other Dimensions In Music chronology
Other Dimensions in Music (1990)	Now! (1998)

Other Dimensions in Music is the debut album by American free jazz collective quartet Other Dimensions in Music, composed of trumpeter Roy Campbell, multi-instrumentalist Daniel Carter, bassist William Parker and drummer Rashid Bakr. It was recorded in studio in 1989 and released on the Swedish Silkheart label. In the liner notes of the album, Campbell claims "We represent the sum total of the musical masters who played before us and presently". Meanwhile, Parker says that "the music on this album is defined by the strictest rules of beauty, each sound is ordered and cured with the energy of ancient spirits. The same spirits that guided John Coltrane, Louis Armstrong and Bud Powell." The CD edition adds two bonus tracks.

== Reception ==
Professional ratings
Review scores
Source	Rating
AllMusic	3/5 stars
The Penguin Guide to Jazz	2.5/4 stars

In his review for AllMusic, Charlie Wilmoth states, "Despite their involvement with the downtown New York avant-jazz crowd, multi-reedist Daniel Carter, trumpeter Roy Campbell, and bassist William Parker probably play in a pensive, straightforward manner just as often as they play free." The Penguin Guide to Jazz states that in comparation with the next album "the record feels unfocused and often ragged."

== Track listing ==
All compositions by Daniel Carter, Roy Campbell, William Parker, Rashid Bakr

1. "Tradition's Transitional Omissions Suite - Sailing Towards the Dark Happy Voice" - 22:58
2. "Ascent (My Shadow Is a Cloud)" - 16:04
3. "Sihu Chant for Sly Stone"- 15:27
4. "Spirits Rise/Fall (Dedicated to Ethel Brown Lee)" - 15:51

2 & 4 does not appear on original LP

== Personnel ==
- Daniel Carter - alto sax, tenor sax, flute, trumpet
- Roy Campbell - trumpet, flugelhorn, recorder
- William Parker - bass
- Rashid Bakr - drums
