= Gastr del Sol =

American band

- Origin: Chicago, Illinois, United States
- Genres: Post-rock; avant-garde
- Years active: 1991-1998
- Labels: Teenbeat, Drag City, Table of the Elements
- Past members: David Grubbs; Jim O'Rourke; Bundy K. Brown; John McEntire

Gastr del Sol was an American band, consisting for most of their career of David Grubbs and Jim O'Rourke, based in Chicago. Between 1993 and 1998, they released four albums and three EPs.

== Biography ==
Grubbs formed the band in 1991 from the line-up of the group Bastro, with Bundy K. Brown and John McEntire on bass guitar and drums respectively. The group had previously premiered sketches of songs in their final shows, with the live recordings being released in 2005 as Antlers, which demonstrated their departure from post-hardcore to focus on unconventional math rock. With their new name being derived from a combination of their previous name, and the name of a race horse (Gato del Sol), the trio released their first album, The Serpentine Similar in 1993, with several songs working off of Grubbs' sketches. Brown and McEntire left to join Tortoise the following year, and guitarist/composer/producer Jim O'Rourke joined. The group became mainly a collaboration between Grubbs and O'Rourke, joined by an ever-changing collection of guests. Though McEntire was no longer a full member, he continued contributing to many Gastr del Sol recordings and concerts.

Most releases by this line-up were on Chicago's Drag City, beginning with the acoustic guitar-based Crookt, Crackt, or Fly in 1994. "Work From Smoke", the centerpiece of this album which evolved from another live Bastro sketch, fused Grubbs and O'Rourke's penchant for atonal guitar interplay with bass clarinet and Grubbs's increasingly surrealist lyrics. Sam Prekop named the band The Sea and Cake after a misreading of the album's song "The C in Cake". A pair of releases followed quickly in 1995. The Mirror Repair EP added elements of electroacoustic music. The Harp Factory on Lake Street, released on the Table of the Elements label, was their most experimental work, a piece for chamber orchestra with only occasional voice and piano from Grubbs. Also in 1995, the band contributed the song "Quietly Approaching" to the AIDS benefit album Red Hot + Bothered produced by the Red Hot Organization.

Upgrade & Afterlife, released in 1996, included contributions from experimental musicians Kevin Drumm, Günter Müller and Tony Conrad. Meanwhile, with the release of Camoufleur in 1998, Gastr del Sol progressed further into conventional melodicism with the resulting album being described by critics as chamber pop, creating their most accessible and popular album. Its chord patterns, melodies, and flugelhorn and string-heavy arrangements prefigured O'Rourke's later releases such as Eureka. The album was co-written with Markus Popp, of the pioneering German glitch group Oval, who contributed the electronic aspects of the album. Both albums also featured drum and percussion contributions from McEntire. After Camoufleur, due to personal differences and grievances, the duo split up. Grubbs and O'Rourke have both continued to release albums under their own names in the fields of rock, pop, and experimental music.

In 2024, Drag City released We Have Dozens of Titles, a 3LP/2CD retrospective boxset containing various rare or unreleased studio and live recordings made by the band between 1993 and 1998.

== Discography ==
- The Serpentine Similar (Teenbeat/Drag City, 1993)
- Twenty Songs Less (Teenbeat, 1993)
- Crookt, Crackt, or Fly (Drag City, 1994)
- Mirror Repair EP (Drag City, 1994)
- The Harp Factory on Lake Street (Table of the Elements, 1995)
- The Japanese Room at LA Pagode (with Tony Conrad) (Table of the Elements, 1995)
- Upgrade & Afterlife (Drag City, 1996)
- Camoufleur (Drag City, 1998)
- We Have Dozens of Titles (Drag City, 2024)
