= Collage (M'Boom album) =

Studio album by M'Boom
- Released: 1984
- Recorded: October 16, 17 & 18, 1984
- Genre: Jazz
- Length: 42:30
- Label: Soul Note
- Producer: Max Roach

Max Roach chronology
It's Christmas Again (1984)	Collage (1984)	Survivors (1984)

Collage is an album by American jazz percussion ensemble M'Boom led by Max Roach recorded in 1984 for the Italian Soul Note label.

== Reception ==
The Allmusic review by Ken Dryden awarded the album 3 stars stating "While listening to the mix of different instruments from track to track is fun, this CD is better savored a track or two at a time than trying to absorb the whole thing in one sitting".

Professional ratings
Review scores
Source	Rating
Allmusic	3/5 stars

== Track listing ==
All compositions by Max Roach except as indicated

1. "Circles" (Joe Chambers) - 7:28
2. "It's Time" - 5:32
3. "Jamaican Sun" (Roy Brooks) - 6:24
4. "Street Dance" - 5:32
5. "Mr. Seven" (Warren Smith) - 10:54
6. "A Quiet Place" - 6:40
  1. Recorded at Vanguard Studios in New York City on October 16, 17 & 18, 1984

== Personnel ==
- Max Roach - bass drum, vibes, marimba percussion, concert snare
- Kenyatte Abdur-Rahman - xylophone, cabasa, claves, percussion, bass drum
- Joe Chambers - marimba, bass marimba, xylophone
- Eli Fountain - xylophone, vibes, bass drum, bells, snare drum, crotales
- Freddie Waits - tom-tom, percussion, shaker, bass marimba
- Ray Mantilla - conga, timpani, bongos, bells, chimes
- Warren Smith - timpani, vibes, bass marimba, percussion
- Eddie Allen - woodblocks, percussion, claves, cabasa, bell tree, cymbal, triangle, finger cymbal
- Roy Brooks - slapstick, percussion, steel drum, musical saw, tom-tom
- Fred King - concert bells, cowbell, timpani, vibes
