= Federico Ughi =

Italian drummer and composer (born 1972)

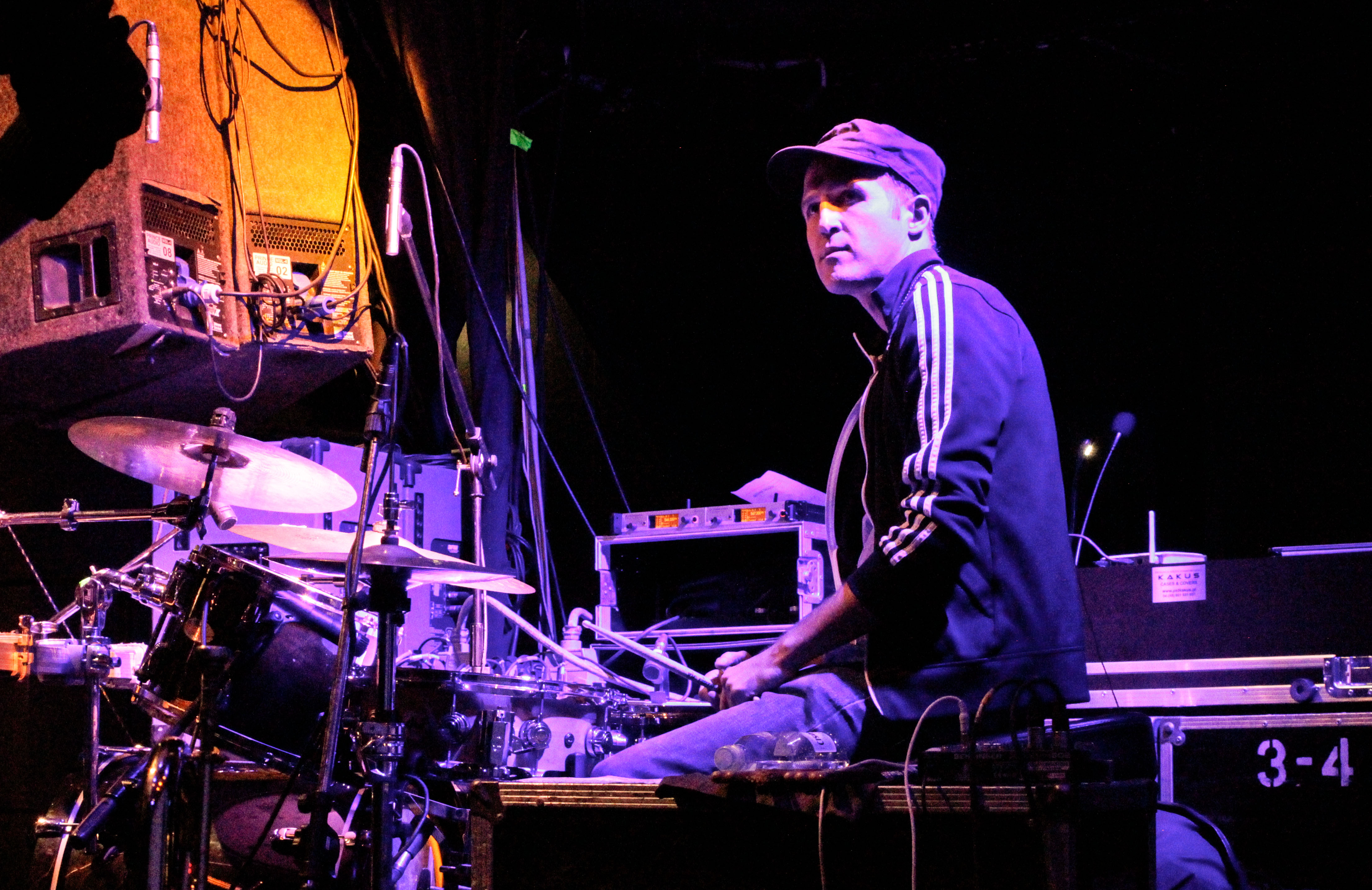

Background information
- Born: 11 October 1972 (age 52); Rome, Italy
- Genres: Free improvisation, avant-garde jazz
- Occupation: Musician
- Instrument: Drums
- Years active: 1991–present
- Labels: 577 Records
- Website: federicoughi.com

Federico Ughi (born 1972) is an Italian drummer and composer. He works primarily in the fields of free improvisation and jazz.

== Career ==
A native of Rome, Italy, he started playing drums at the age of twelve. In 1994 he moved to England, joined a quartet, and studied with pianist Paul Bley. After 2000 he lived in New York City and performed as a duo with Daniel Carter. He has worked with Steve Dalachinsky and DJ Food.

== Discography ==
- The Space Within (Slam Productions, 2000)
- Ulers Two (577, 2002)
- I Thought It Was the End of the World Then the End of the World Happened Again with Steve Dalachinsky (577, 2002)
- South of Brooklyn (577, 2003)
- Songs for Four Cities (Skycap, 2012)
- Quartet (FMR, 2013)
- Heart Talk (577, 2016)
- Transoceanico (577, 2019)

With Daniel Carter

- Astonishment (577, 2001)
- Concrete Science (577, 2004)
- The Dream (577, 2006)
- Mountain Path (577, 2007)
- People's Resonance (577, 2008)
- The Gowanus Recordings (577, 2010)
- Perfect Blue (Not Two, 2010)
- Navajo Sunrise (Rudi, 2013)
- Extra Room (577, 2015)
- Extra Room Vol. 2 (577, 2015)
- Life Station (577, 2016)
- Vol. 1 Erie Live! (577, 2017)
- Vol. 2 Toronto Live! (577, 2017)
- Vol. 3 Rochester Live! (577, 2017)
- Telepathic Alliances (577, 2017)
- Telepatia Liquida (577, 2018)
- New York United (577, 2019)
- Radical Invisibility (577, 2019)

With others

- Paul Flaherty, Morfina (2017)
- Kirk Knuffke, Garden of Gifts (577, 2009)
- Matthew F. Morris, Unspecifications (Slam Productions, 1999)
- Ras Moshe, Dave Ross, Red River Flows (577, 2008)
- Jeff Platz, Past & Present Futures (Glitch, 2013)
