= Tribute to Albert Ayler Live at the Dynamo =

Live album by Roy Campbell, Joe McPhee, William Parker, Warren Smith
- Released: 2009
- Recorded: November 21, 2008
- Venue: The Dynamo, Pantin
- Genre: Jazz
- Length: 74:13
- Label: Marge
- Producer: Gérard Terronès

Tribute to Albert Ayler Live at the Dynamo is an album by a free jazz quartet composed of trumpeter Roy Campbell, multi-instrumentalist Joe McPhee, bassist William Parker and drummer Warren Smith.

The record documents a November 2008 performance at the Dynamo (Pantin), a concert hall dedicated to jazz in the suburbs of Paris, and was released in 2009 by producer Gérard Terronès’ idea on the French Marge label.

== Background ==
The quartet was in a three-week European tour inspired by Albert Ayler's music. About the sense of the tribute to the free jazz icon, in an interview conducted before the concert for the CD edition, McPhee claims "I heard Albert Ayler’s music and the very first thing that I heard, that grabbed me, was the sound that was completely different from what I’d heard, there was an intensity, there was a spirituality, there was something very special about it that made me want to play the saxophone,." Campbell says "When I first heard Donald Ayler, I’d never heard nobody playing trumpet like that and it just electrified me and excited me and then, I always thought that Albert’s music and his brother’s music was like a circle, was the beginning and the end at the same time."

== Music ==
The performance starts with the recitation of Ayler's composition "Music Is The Healing Force Of The Universe", which evolves into Miriam Makeba's "Muntu". "Obama Victory Shoutout" is a quartet's improvisation celebrating the Barack Obama's victory a few days before, which moves into Ayler's "Truth is Marching In". "DC", a tune dedicated to Don Cherry and credited to Ayler on Spirits Rejoice, evolves into Ayler composition "Vibrations". Donald Ayler tune "Prophet John" and Albert Ayler's "Universal Indians" end the record.

== Reception ==
The JazzTimes review by Lyn Horton states "This tour was built on the spirit, the dream and the magic of Ayler’s music, rather than its emulation. The inspiration of Ayler’s music alone became the glue that allowed the four band members, who had never worked together before, integrate their individual improvisatory languages into a sound that was meant to be".

== Track listing ==
All compositions by Albert Ayler except as indicated

1. "Music is the Healing Force of the Universe" - 6:30
2. "Muntu" (Miriam Makeba)- 15:18
3. "Obama Victory Shoutout" (Roy Campbell, Joe McPhee, William Parker, Warren Smith) & "Truth is Marching In"- 13:49
4. "DC" (Don Cherry) & "Vibrations" - 16:51
5. "Prophet John" (Don Ayler) - 15:05
6. "Universal Indians" - 6:40

== Personnel ==
- Roy Campbell - trumpet, pocket trumpet, bamboo flute, recorder, voice
- Joe McPhee - tenor sax, pocket trumpet, bamboo flute, recorder, voice
- William Parker - bass, voice
- Warren Smith - drums, percussion, voice
