= Vessel in Orbit =

Studio album by Whit Dickey, Mat Maneri, and Matthew Shipp
- Released: March 24, 2017
- Recorded: March 18, 2016
- Studio: Park West, Brooklyn
- Genre: Jazz
- Length: 48:14
- Label: Aum Fidelity
- Producer: Whit Dickey

Whit Dickey chronology
Fierce Silence (2016)	Vessel in Orbit (2017)

Vessel in Orbit is an album by American jazz drummer Whit Dickey, Mat Maneri, and Matthew Shipp recorded in 2016 and released on the Aum Fidelity label. The recording presents a new trio with violist Mat Maneri and pianist Matthew Shipp, who were both part of the quartet, along with saxophonist Rob Brown, for 2001 Dickey's album Life Cycle.

== Reception ==
Professional ratings
Review scores
Source	Rating
Down Beat	3.5/5 stars

The Down Beat review by Bradley Bambarger states "Although one must be open to a certain exposed-nerve intensity to fully appreciate it, Vessel In Orbit has the air of an abstract drama, the three storyteller-improvisers utterly in sync."

== Track listing ==
All compositions by Dickey/Maneri/Shipp.

1. "Spaceship 9" – 5:15
2. "Space Walk" – 6:37
3. "Dark Matter" – 5:58
4. "Galaxy 9" – 9:13
5. "Turbulence" – 4:51
6. "To a Lost Comrade" – 5:39
7. "Space Strut" – 4:29
8. "Hyperspatial" – 6:12

== Personnel ==
- Whit Dickey – drums
- Mat Maneri – viola
- Matthew Shipp – piano
