= Ancestral Homeland =

Studio album by Roy Campbell
- Released: 1998
- Recorded: February 12, 1998
- Studio: Strobe-Light Sound, New York
- Genre: Jazz
- Length: 72:43
- Label: No More
- Producer: Alan Schneider

Roy Campbell chronology
Communion (1995)	Ancestral Homeland (1998)	Ethnic Stew and Brew (2001)

Ancestral Homeland is the fourth album by American jazz trumpeter Roy Campbell, the second by Pyramid Trio, and the first by the original lineup with bassist William Parker and drummer Zen Matsuura. The album was recorded and released in 1998 on No More. According to Campbell, "the music of the Pyramid Trio is based on World Universal Music, composed and improvised". "Song for Alan" is dedicated to jazz trumpeter Alan Shorter, while "Brother Yusef" is a tribute to Campbell's teacher Yusef Lateef.

== Reception ==
Professional ratings
Review scores
Source	Rating
AllMusic	4/5 stars
DownBeat	3.5/5 stars

The AllMusic review by Scott Yanow states that "each listen to these performances reveals more secrets and shows how well these three master players communicate with each other".

The DownBeat review by Jon Andrews says that the album "frequently brings Don Cherry's work to mind. Campbell's tart, somewhat terse playing on trumpet and pocket trumpet, suggest Cherry, as do the world-music influences that color the trio's performances."

== Track listing ==
All compositions by Roy Campbell except as indicated

1. "Song for Alan" - 11:42
2. "Ancestral Homeland" - 11:56
3. "The Positive Path"- 14:35
4. "Oglala Eclipse" (William Parker)- 9:20
5. "Bean Dance" (William Parker)- 5:08
6. "Brother Yusef (intro)" - 3:26
7. "Brother Yusef" - 6:10
8. "Camel Caravan" - 10:26

== Personnel ==
- Roy Campbell - trumpet, flugelhorn, pocket trumpet, argol, recorder, wood flute, percussion
- William Parker - bass, percussion
- Zen Matsuura - drums, gong, percussion
