= Posium Pendasem =

Live album by William Parker
- Released: 1999
- Recorded: April 9 & 11, 1998
- Venue: Akademie der Künste, Berlin
- Genre: Jazz
- Length: 65:54
- Label: FMP
- Producer: Jost Gebers

William Parker chronology
The Peach Orchard (1998)	Posium Pendasem (1999)	Fractured Dimensions (1999)

Posium Pendasem is an album by American jazz double bassist William Parker, which was recorded live during the Workshop Freie Musik '98 at The Akademie der Künste in Berlin, and released on the German FMP label.

The performance documents an expanded edition of the band In Order To Survive, a quintet with Rob Brown on alto sax, Cooper-Moore on piano, Susie Ibarra on drums, and newcomer Assif Tsahar on tenor sax and bass clarinet. This lineup played a piece on the previous album by the band, The Peach Orchard. The last composition of the suite, titled “Another Angel Goes Home”, is a requiem for the drummer Denis Charles, who died a few days before.

== Reception ==
Professional ratings
Review scores
Source	Rating
AllMusic	4/5 stars
The Penguin Guide to Jazz	3.5/4 stars

In his review for AllMusic, Steve Loewy states "While there is no new ground broken, this recording is a fine example of the creative intensity generated by a small conglomeration that continues to knock out some of the finest music of its kind." The Penguin Guide to Jazz claims "Fabulous music, in every sense of the word, dense and thoughtful brightly coloured and abstract by turns."

The All About Jazz review by Derek Taylor says that "The density and momentum of the interplay is often as exhausting as it is invigorating." The JazzTimes review by Bill Shoemaker states "Exemplary of Parker's approach to extended open-form works, it is refreshingly void of pat, diffused intensity and clumsy transition points."

== Track listing ==
All compositions by William Parker

1. "Posium Pendasem #9" - 1:33
2. "Possium Pendasem #7" - 50:51
3. "Another Angel Goes Home" - 13:30

== Personnel ==
- Rob Brown - alto sax, flute
- Assif Tsahar - tenor sax, bass clarinet
- Cooper-Moore - piano
- William Parker - bass
- Susie Ibarra - drums
