= The Thicket (album) =

Studio album by David Grubbs
- Released: September 15, 1998
- Recorded: March 1998–June 1998
- Studio: Solid Sound, Ann Arbor, Michigan
- Genre: Folk rock, indie rock
- Length: 34:56
- Label: Drag City

David Grubbs chronology
Banana Cabbage, Potato Lettuce, Onion Orange (1997)	The Thicket (1998)	Apertura (1999)

Professional ratings
Review scores
Source	Rating
Allmusic	3/5 stars

The Thicket is the second album by David Grubbs, released on September 15, 1998, through Drag City.

== Track listing ==
All tracks are written by David Grubbs.

No.	Title	Length
1.	"The Thicket"	4:35
2.	"Two Shades Of Blue"	4:15
3.	"Fool Summons Train"	6:30
4.	"Orange Disaster"	2:01
5.	"Amleth's Gambit"	5:30
6.	"40 Words on "Worship""	1:42
7.	"Swami Vivekananda Way"	1:25
8.	"Buried in the Wall"	3:34
9.	"On "Worship""	5:24

== Personnel ==
Musicians

- Joshua Abrams – bass guitar
- Jeb Bishop – trombone
- Tony Conrad – violin
- David Grubbs – guitar
- Ernst Karel – trumpet, flugelhorn
- John McEntire – drums, percussion
- Mary Lass Stewart – vocals

Production and additional personnel

- Phil Bonnet – recording
- Renaud Monfourny – photography
- Stephen Prina – cover art
