= Communion (Roy Campbell album) =

Studio album by Roy Campbell
- Released: 1995
- Recorded: September 13 & 14, 1994
- Studio: Pilot Recording, New York
- Genre: Jazz
- Length: 74:40
- Label: Silkheart
- Producer: Roy Campbell

Roy Campbell chronology
| La Tierra del Fuego (1994) | Communion (1995) | Ancestral Homeland (1998) |

Communion is the third album by American jazz trumpeter Roy Campbell. It was the debut recording of his Pyramid Trio, with bassist William Parker and Reggie Nicholson replacing original drummer Zen Matsuura. The album was recorded in 1994 and released on the Swedish Silkheart label. Roy pays tribute to avant-garde jazz musicians Don Cherry, Hannibal Marvin Peterson, and brothers Don & Albert Ayler.

== Reception ==
Professional ratings
Review scores
| Source | Rating |
|---|---|
| AllMusic | 4/5 stars |
| The Penguin Guide to Jazz | 3/4 stars |

Scott Yanow, in his review for AllMusic, says because of the length of some of the pieces, "there are some meandering moments but in general the interplay between the three musicians holds one's interest." The Penguin Guide to Jazz states, "Campbell remains a gratifying and lyrical performer, even at his furthest out."

== Track listing ==
All compositions by Roy Campbell except as indicated

1. "Communion" (William Parker) - 9:15
2. "Vigilance" - 9:18
3. "Chant for Don Cherry"- 12:04
4. "Air Pockets" (William Parker) - 14:32
5. "Blues for Albert and Don Ayler" - 15:22
6. "One for Hannibal" - 14:09

== Personnel ==
- Roy Campbell - trumpet, flugelhorn, pocket trumpet, cornet, percussion
- William Parker - bass, percussion
- Reggie Nicholson - drums, percussion
