= Mayor of Punkville =

Live album by William Parker & The Little Huey Creative Music Orchestra
- Released: June 20, 2000
- Recorded: July 10, August 14, September 4 & November 27, 1999; Tonic, NYC
- Genre: Jazz
- Length: 140:40
- Labels: AUM Fidelity; AUM 015/16
- Producers: William Parker & Steven Joerg

William Parker chronology
Fractured Dimensions (1999)	Mayor of Punkville (2000)	Painter's Spring (2000)

Mayor of Punkville is a double live album by American jazz bassist William Parker and his Little Huey Creative Music Orchestra, which was recorded at Tonic in New York City in 1999 and released on the AUM Fidelity label.

== Reception ==
Professional ratings
Review scores
Source	Rating
AllMusic	4.5/5 stars
The Penguin Guide to Jazz Recordings	4/4 stars

In her review for AllMusic, Jocelyn Layne states "It is a terrific proof of bassist William Parker's strength as a leader and is one of his most engaging releases to date". The All About Jazz review noted "Parker's vision on Mayor of Punkville realizes itself over time through a living, breathing apparatus of free improvisation".

== Track listing ==
All compositions by William Parker

Disc One:

1. " Interlude #1 (The Next Phase)" - 4:00
2. "James Baldwin to the Rescue" - 18:26
3. "Oglala Eclipse" - 19:47
4. "I Can't Believe I Am Here" - 28:50

Disc Two:

1. "Interlude #7 (Huey's Blues)" - 5:23
2. "3 Steps to Noh Mountain: Departure" - 5:08
3. "3 Steps to Noh Mountain: Soft Wheel" - 5:22
4. "3 Steps to Noh Mountain: Laughing Eyes and Dancing" - 3:45
5. "The Mayor of Punkville" - 30:51
6. "Interlude #8 (Holy Door)" - 6:01
7. "Anthem" - 13:07
- Recorded at Tonic in NYC on July 10 (Disc One, tracks 2 & 3), August 14 (Disc Two, tracks 2–4), September 4 (Disc One, track 4 & Disc Two tracks 5 & 7) & November 27 (Disc One, track 1 & Disc Two, tracks 1 & 6)

== Personnel ==
- William Parker - bass, piano
- Roy Campbell Jr. - trumpet - flugelhorn
- Lewis Barnes, Richard Rodriguez - trumpet
- Masahiko Kono, Alex Lodico, Steve Swell - trombone
- Darryl Foster - tenor saxophone, soprano saxophone
- Chris Jonas - soprano saxophone
- Rob Brown - alto saxophone, flute
- Ori Kaplan - alto saxophone
- Charles Waters - alto saxophone, clarinet
- Dave Sewelson - baritone saxophone
- Dave Hofstra - tuba, bass
- Andrew Barker - drums
- Cooper-Moore - piano (Disc One, tracks 2 & 3)
- Aleta Hayes - voice (Disc One, track 2)
