= Apertura (album) =

Studio album by David Grubbs and Mats Gustafsson
- Released: July 6, 1999
- Recorded: January 19, 1998
- Studios: Überstudio, Chicago
- Genre: Folk rock
- Length: 65:18
- Label: Blue Chopsticks

David Grubbs chronology
The Thicket (1998)	Apertura (1999)	The Coxcomb (1999)

Professional ratings
Review scores
Source	Rating
Allmusic	4/5 stars
Alternative Press	4/5 stars

Apertura is an album by Mats Gustafsson and David Grubbs, released on July 6, 1999, through Blue Chopsticks.

== Track listing ==
All music is composed by Mats Gustafsson and David Grubbs.

No.	Title	Length
1.	"Apertura" (Part 1)	39:50
2.	"Apertura" (Part 2)	25:28

== Personnel ==
Musicians

- David Grubbs – Harmonium
- Mats Gustafsson – tenor saxophone, flute

Production and additional personnel

- Bundy K. Brown – recording
- Gaylen Gerber – cover art
