= Magnetism (album) =

Studio album by Matthew Shipp
- Released: 1999
- Recorded: January 26, 1999
- Studio: Seltzer Sound, New York City
- Genre: Jazz
- Length: 58:31
- Label: Bleu Regard
- Producer: Michel Dorbon

Matthew Shipp chronology
DNA (1999)	Magnetism (1999)	Gravitational Systems (2000)

Magnetism is an album by American jazz pianist Matthew Shipp which was recorded in 1999 and released on the French Bleu Regard label. The work is a twenty-movement suite composed of solo, duo and trio performances by Shipp, saxophonist and flutist Rob Brown and bassist William Parker.

== Reception ==
Professional ratings
Review scores
Source	Rating
Allmusic	4.5/5 stars

In his review for AllMusic, Steve Loewy states "Shipp continues to impress with splendid technique, an ear for subtlety, and rhythmic variety."

== Track listing ==
All compositions by Matthew Shipp

1. "Magnetism I" – 0:55
2. "Magnetism II" – 3:19
3. "Magnetism III" – 3:48
4. "Magnetism IV" – 2:28
5. "Magnetism V" – 3:29
6. "Magnetism VI" – 1:10
7. "Magnetism VII" – 3:07
8. "Magnetism VIII" – 4:11
9. "Magnetism IX" – 0:28
10. "Magnetism X" – 3:24
11. "Magnetism XI" – 3:38
12. "Magnetism XII" – 0:43
13. "Magnetism XIII" – 4:08
14. "Magnetism XIV" – 2:18
15. "Magnetism XV" – 4:54
16. "Magnetism XVI" – 0:53
17. "Magnetism XVII" – 3:05
18. "Magnetism XVIII" – 3:42
19. "Magnetism XIX" – 1:41
20. "Magnetism XX" – 5:32

== Personnel ==
- Matthew Shipp – piano
- Rob Brown – alto sax, flute
- William Parker – double bass
