= To the Max! =

Studio album by Max Roach
- Released: 1992
- Recorded: September 15 & November 30, 1990, April 29 and June 15, 24–25, 1991, Paris, France, Buffalo, NY, Northampton, MA, Astoria NY and New York City
- Genre: Jazz
- Length: 95:56
- Label: Enja; ENJ 7021/22
- Producer: Max Roach

Max Roach chronology
The Paris All Stars Homage to Charlie Parker (1989)	To the Max! (1992)	Max Roach with the New Orchestra of Boston and the So What Brass Quintet (1993)

To the Max! is a double album by American jazz drummer Max Roach featuring tracks recorded in 1990 and 1991 and released on the Enja label. The album features Roach with various ensembles and combines live and studio recordings that celebrate Roach's diverse musical output.

== Reception ==
Professional ratings
Review scores
Source	Rating
Allmusic	4.5/5 stars

Allmusic awarded the album 4½ and its review by Scott Yanow states, "The music, which crosses quite a few boundaries, is consistently fascinating and forms a definitive portrait of the ageless drummer's wide musical interests in the early '90s."

== Track listing ==
All compositions by Max Roach except as indicated

Disc one

1. "Ghost Dance (PT. I)" – 14:50
2. "Ghost Dance (PT. II) – 9:32
3. "Ghost Dance (PT. III) – 6:19
4. "A Quiet Place" – 3:51
5. "The Profit" – 3:40
6. "Tears" – 6:50
7. "Self Portrait" – 4:02
- Recorded at Rev'O Jazz, Paris, on September 15, 1990 (track 7), Clinton Recording Studios, New York on June 15, 1991 (tracks 1 & 3), Master Sound Astoria, New York on June 24, 1991 (tracks 2 & 4) and The Power Station, New York on June 25, 1991 (tracks 5 & 6)

Disc two

1. "A Little Booker" – 21:03
2. "Street Dance" – 5:21
3. "Tricotism" (Oscar Pettiford) – 3:17
4. "Mwalimu" (Odean Pope) – 16:33
5. "Drums Unlimited" – 4:38
- Recorded at Rev'O Jazz, Paris, on September 15, 1990 (track 5), The Marquee at the Tralf, Buffalo, New York on November 30, 1990 (track 3), The Iron Horse, Northampton, Massachusetts on April 29, 1991 (track 4), Master Sound Astoria, New York on June 24, 1991 (track 2) and The Power Station, New York on June 25, 1991 (track 1)

== Personnel ==
- Max Roach – drums, percussion
- Cecil Bridgewater – trumpet (tracks: 1–5, 1–6, 2–1, 2–3, 2–4)
- Odean Pope – tenor saxophone (tracks: 1–5, 1–6, 2–1, 2–3, 2–4)
- Tyrone Brown – electric bass (tracks: 1–5, 1–6, 2–1, 2–3, 2–4)
- George Cables – piano (tracks: 1-1, 1–3)
- Roy Brooks, Joe Chambers, Omar Clay, Eli Fountain, Fred King, Ray Mantilla, Francisco Mora, Warren Smith – percussion (tracks: 1–2, 1–4, 2–2)
- Diane Monroe, Lesa Terry – violin (tracks: 1-1, 1–3, 2–1)
- Maxine Roach – viola (tracks: 1-1, 1–3, 2–1)
- Eileen Folson – cello (tracks: 1-1, 1–3, 2–1)
- Robbin L. Balfour, Priscilla Baskerville, Ronell Bey, James Gainer, Florence Jackson, Karen Jackson, Lucille J. Jacobsen, Greg Jones, T. Ray Lawrence, John Motley, Christopher Pickens, Sarah Ann Rodgers, Abraham Shelton, Brenda Lee Taub, Thomas Young – vocals (tracks: 1-1, 1–3)
