= Crookt, Crackt, or Fly =

Studio album by Gastr del Sol
- Released: April 18, 1994
- Recorded: October 1993
- Studios: Kingsize (Chicago, Illinois)
- Genres: Post-rock; avant-garde
- Length: 45:15
- Label: Drag City

Gastr del Sol chronology
The Serpentine Similar (1993)	Crookt, Crackt, or Fly (1994)	Upgrade & Afterlife (1995)

Professional ratings
Review scores
Source	Rating
AllMusic	4/5 stars

Crookt, Crackt, or Fly is the second studio album by American post-rock band Gastr del Sol, released on April 18, 1994, by Drag City. The album was written and performed by David Grubbs and Jim O'Rourke, with John McEntire (percussion), Steve Butters (percussion) and Gene Coleman (bass clarinet) also contributing. It was recorded by Brian Paulson in October 1993 at Kingsize in Chicago.

In 2016, Crookt, Crackt, or Fly was ranked at number 17 on Paste's list of the best post-rock albums. John McEntire's band the Sea and Cake derived their name from his mishearing of the title of the song "The C in Cake".

== Track listing ==
All tracks are written by David Grubbs and Jim O'Rourke.

No.	Title	Length
1.	"Wedding in the Park"	1:02
2.	"Work from Smoke"	12:30
3.	"Parenthetically"	1:20
4.	"Every Five Miles"	7:49
5.	"Thos. Dudley Ah! Old Must Dye"	2:40
6.	"Is That a Rifle When It Rains?"	1:29
7.	"The C in Cake"	3:36
8.	"The Wrong Soundings"	14:49
