= Time Is of the Essence Is Beyond Time =

Live album by Other Dimensions In Music
- Released: 2000
- Recorded: December 2, 1997
- Venue: Knitting Factory, New York City
- Genre: Jazz
- Length: 66:30
- Label: AUM Fidelity
- Producer: Steven Joerg with Roy Campbell, Matthew Shipp

Other Dimensions In Music chronology
Now! (1998)	Time Is of the Essence Is Beyond Time (2000)	Live at the Sunset (2007)

Time Is of the Essence Is Beyond Time is the third album by free jazz collective quartet Other Dimensions In Music, composed of trumpeter Roy Campbell, multi-instrumentalist Daniel Carter, bassist William Parker and drummer Rashid Bakr. For this special quintet, recorded live in 1997 and released on the AUM Fidelity label, they are joined by pianist Matthew Shipp.

== Reception ==
Professional ratings
Review scores
Source	Rating
AllMusic	4.5/5 stars
The Penguin Guide to Jazz	3.5/4 stars

In his review for AllMusic, Thom Jurek states "For the listener, 66 minutes is all too brief a period to be engulfed in this ecstatic world of discovery and challenge. You're left wanting more, and all you have to do is hit play again to be immersed once more."

The Penguin Guide to Jazz says that "The meeting with Shipp is excellent. The pianist, effortlessly versatile in free situations, takes his place in the ensemble without any awkwardness."

The JazzTimes review by John Murph notes that "the untitled seven-part suite places heavy emphasis on collective improvisation with little regard for conventional song structure. Given that, depending on your leanings toward ecstatic jazz, the performance amounts to either sonic improvisation of the highest order or indiscernible hermetic noise."

The All About Jazz review by Glenn Astarita says that the album "is brimming with innocence, harmony, crisp dialogue and passion as the musicians pursue a cavalcade of themes and motifs in consolidated fashion."

== Track listing ==
All compositions by Other Dimensions In Music

1. ">" - 9:27
2. ">" - 4:25
3. ">" - 7:29
4. ">" - 3:44
5. ">" - 5:17
6. ">" - 23:32
7. ">" - 13:33

== Personnel ==
- Daniel Carter - alto sax, tenor sax, flute, trumpet
- Roy Campbell - trumpet, flugelhorn, pocket trumpet
- Matthew Shipp - piano
- William Parker - bass
- Rashid Bakr - drums
