= Daniel Carter (musician) =

American free jazz musician

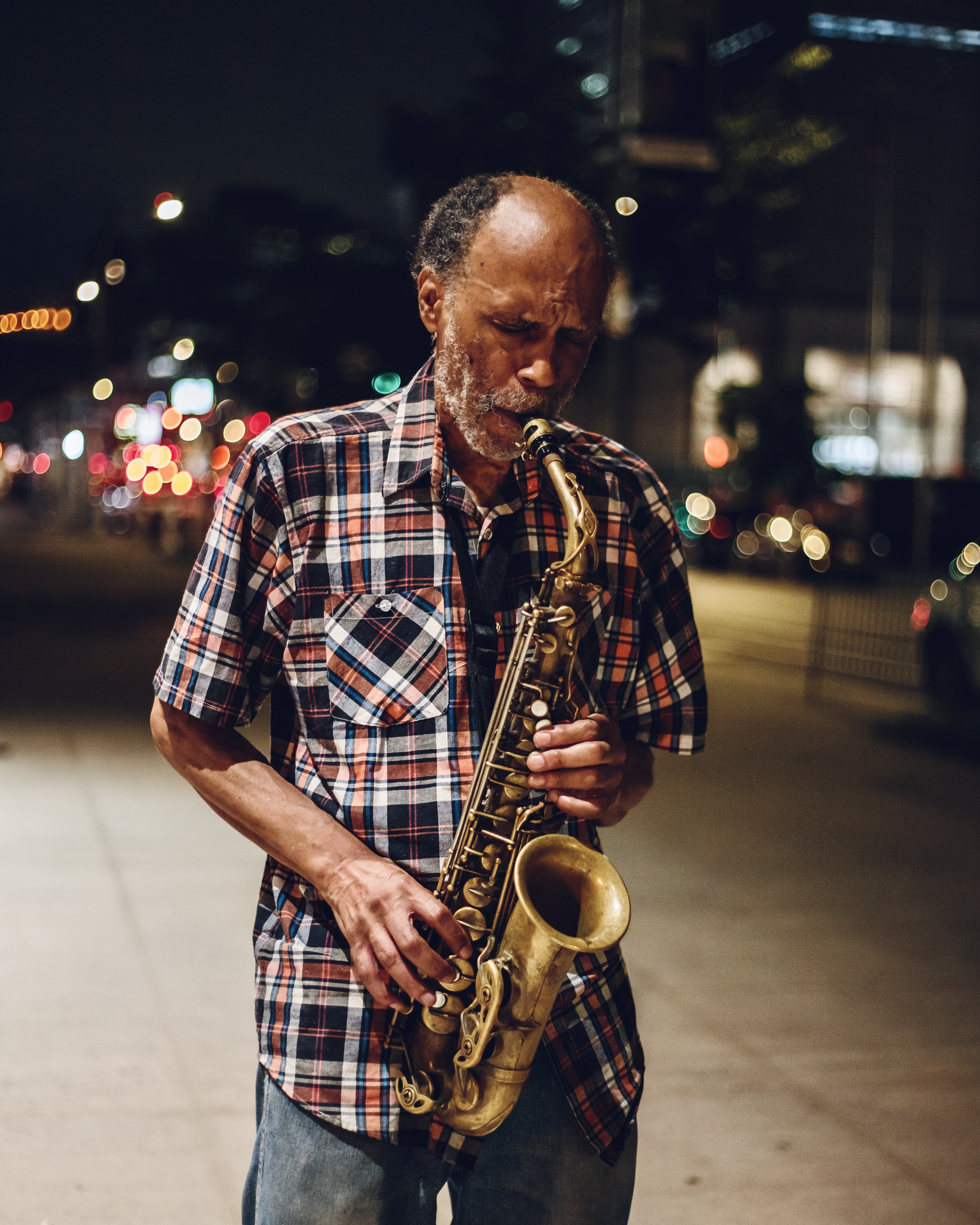
- Carter in Manhattan, 2022.

Background information
- Born: Wilkinsburg, Pennsylvania
- Genre: Free jazz
- Occupation: Musician
- Instruments: Saxophone, trumpet, flute
- Years active: 1970s–present
- Label: 577 Records

Daniel Carter is an American free jazz musician who plays saxophone, trumpet, and flute.

== Career ==
Carter has recorded and performed with many distinguished musicians, including William Parker, Federico Ughi, DJ Logic, The Negatones, Thurston Moore, Yo La Tengo, Soul-Junk, Anne Waldman, Cooper-Moore, Matthew Shipp and scientist/musician Matthew Putman among others. He is a member of the cooperative free jazz groups Test, Other Dimensions In Music, odon, Ghost Moth and Dissipated Face.

In 2007 the Pendu Sound compilation album Getting rid of the glue with Excepter and Daniel Carter was listed as number 70 in Thurston Moore's "Top 80 of 2006". In 2015 the New York Forward Festival was created to celebrate Carter's 70th birthday.

== Discography ==
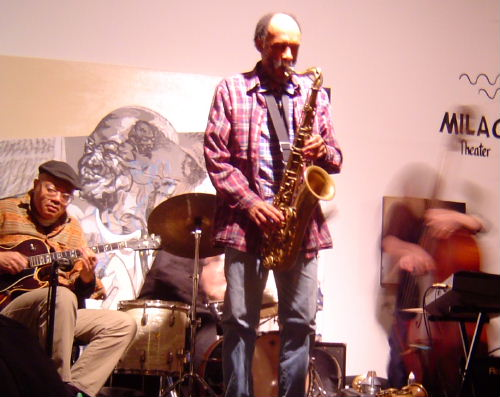
Carter at Les Gallery Clemente Soto Velez in New York City, February 5, 2005

=== As co-leader ===
- Switched-On Irresponsibility with Post Prandials (Artichoke & Tristero, 1995)
- High Wire with Post Prandials (Artichoke & Tristero, 1996)
- Tenor Rising Drums Expanding with Tenor Rising Drums Expanding (Sound@One, 1996)
- Resonance with Randall Colbourne (Zaabway Music, 1997)
- Breathing Together (Freedom, 1997)
- Third World War with Tenor Rising Drums Expanding (Sound@One, 1998)
- Meditations on Unity (Sublingual, 2000)
- Astonishment with Federico Ughi (577 Records, 2001)
- Principle Hope with Peter Kowald (Sublingual, 2002)
- Language with Gregg Keplinger (Origin, 2002)
- Amusement Park with Freedomland (Rent Control, 2002)
- Real Time Messengers with Transcendentalists (CIMP, 2002)
- Luminescence with Reuben Radding (AUM Fidelity, 2003)
- Chinatown with Blumenkranz & Zubek (Not Two, 2003)
- Mysterium with Morgan Craft, Eric Eigner (Eavesdrop 2004)
- Not Out for Anywhere with Gregg Keplinger, Reuben Radding (Sol Disk, 2004)
- Matt Lavelle and Daniel Carter (Matt Lavelle 2004)
- Concrete Science with Steve Swell (577 Records, 2004)
- Yia Yia's Song with Freedomland (Rent Control, 2004)
- Not On Earth... in Your Soul! with Sabir Mateen (Qbico, 2005)
- The Dream with William Parker (577 Records, 2006)
- Singular (Empty Room Music, 2006)
- Live at Tower Records with Matt Lavelle (Atnimara, 2006)
- Ghost Moth Live! with Ghost Moth (Pendu Sound, 2007)
- Mountain Path with Federico Ughi (577 Records, 2007)
- God's Faithless Bride (Pilate Navigator, 2007)
- Babylon with Harmonize Most High (Ruby Red, 2008)
- Shyunbun (No Hi, 2008)
- Nivesana (Epoch Music, 2008)
- The Gowanus Recordings with Federico Ughi (577 Records, 2009)
- The Perfect Blue with Federico Ughi (Not Two, 2010)
- Navajo Sunrise with William Parker, Federico Ughi (Rudi 2013)
- Say Hello to Anyone I Know with Daniel Levin (Fast Speaking Music, 2014)
- Extra Room with Federico Ughi (577 Records, 2015)
- Extra Room Vol. 2 with Federico Ughi (577 Records, 2015)
- So Long Farewell Repair with George Lyle (Iorram, 2016)
- Life Station with Federico Ughi (577 Records, 2016)
- Vol. 1 Erie Live! with Watson Jennison (577 Records, 2017)
- Vol. 2 Toronto Live! with Watson Jennison (577 Records, 2017)
- Vol. 3 Rochester Live! with Watson Jennison (577 Records, 2017)
- Telepathic Alliances with Patrick Holmes (577 Records, 2017)
- Telepatia Liquida with Patrick Holmes (577 Records, 2018)
- Seraphic Light with William Parker, Matthew Shipp (AUM Fidelity, 2018)
- Live Constructions with Hilliard Greene (Slam, 2018)
- New York United with Tobias Wilner (577 Records, 2019)
- Electric Telepathy Vol. 1 with Patrick Holmes (577 Records, 2019)
- Radical Invisibility with Stelios Mihas (577 Records, 2019)
- Whoadie with Patrick Holmes (577 Records, 2020)
- Welcome Adventure! Vol. 1 with Matthew Shipp, William Parker, Gerald Cleaver (577 Records, 2020)
- Stream of a Dream (577 Records, 2025)

With Other Dimensions in Music

- Other Dimensions In Music (Silkheart, 1990)
- Now! (AUM Fidelity, 1998)
- Time Is of the Essence Is Beyond Time (AUM Fidelity, 2002)
- Live at the Sunset (Marge, 2007)
- Kaiso Stories (Silkheart, 2011)

With Test

- Ahead! (Eremite, 1998)
- Test (AUM Fidelity, 1999)
- Live (Eremite, 2000)
- Always Coming from the Love Side (Eremite, 2016)

=== As sideman ===
With William Parker

- Through Acceptance of the Mystery Peace (Centering, 1980)
- Painter's Spring (Thirsty Ear, 2000)
- Fractured Dimensions (FMP 2003)
- Flower in a Stained-Glass Window & the Blinking of the Ear (Centering, 2018)

With Matthew Shipp

- Strata (hatOLOGY, 1998)
- Nu Bop (Thirsty Ear, 2002)
- Cosmic Suite (Not Two, 2008)
- Nu Bop Live (Rai Trade, 2009)
- Not Bound (For Tune, 2017)

With others

- Ron Anderson, Anything Is Possible (Megaphone/Amanita 2000)
- Antipop Consortium, Antipop vs. Matthew Shipp (Thirsty Ear, 2003)
- Jimmy Bennington, One More Beautiful Ballad (CIMP, 2013)
- Guillermo E. Brown, Soul at the Hands of the Machine (Thirsty Ear, 2002)
- Invitation, The King’s Waltz (Konnex, 2006)
- Candiria, Invaders (Giant 2014)
- Castanets, First Light's Freeze (Asthmatic Kitty, 2005)
- Loren Mazzacane Connors, The Departing of a Dream, Vol. VII
- Ted Daniel, In the Beginning (Altura Music, 1997)
- Ted Daniel, Innerconnection (NoBusiness, 2014)
- Whit Dickey, Emergence (Not Two, 2009)
- DJ Logic, Project Logic (Ropeadope, 1999)
- Hamid Drake, Bindu (RogueArt, 2005)
- El-P, High Water (Thirsty Ear, 2004)
- Frode Gjerstad, Behind the White Fences (Nolabel, 2006)
- David Grubbs, The Spectrum Between (Drag City, 2000)
- Gunter Hampel, Angel (Birth, 1972)
- Gunter Hampel, The Essence in the Nowness of Reality (Birth, 2011)
- Bob Moses, Bittersuite in the Ozone (Mozown, 1975)
- Yoko Ono, Between My Head and the Sky (Chimera Music, 2009)
- Bradford Reed, What's Good for the Goose Is Good (Youngbloods, 2019)
- Alan Silva, H.Con.Res.57/Treasure Box (Eremite, 2003)
- Yo La Tengo, Nuclear War (Matador, 2002)
- Yo La Tengo, Summer Sun (Matador, 2003)
- Luther Thomas, Outcry (Nolabel, 2004)
- Soul-Junk, 1958 Sounds Are Active (Sounds Familyre, 2003)
- Spring Heel Jack, Masses (Thirsty Ear, 2001)
- Kayos Theory, Experiments of Truth (Monsoon-Music, 2017)
- N/UM, Sphēra (Respekt Music, 2026)
