= Coalescence (Whit Dickey album) =

Studio album by Whit Dickey
- Released: 2004
- Recorded: February 8, 2003
- Studio: Strobe Sound, New York City
- Genre: Jazz
- Length: 45:04
- Label: Clean Feed
- Producer: Whit Dickey

Whit Dickey chronology
Prophet Moon (2002)	Coalescence (2004)	In a Heartbeat (2005)

Coalescence is an album by American jazz drummer Whit Dickey recorded in 2003 and released on the Portuguese Clean Feed label. Dickey leads a quartet built around a traditional lineup with Roy Campbell on trumpet, Rob Brown on alto sax and flute and Joe Morris on acoustic bass in place of guitar.

== Reception ==
Professional ratings
Review scores
Source	Rating
Allmusic	3/5 stars
The Penguin Guide to Jazz Recordings	3.5/4 stars

In his review for AllMusic, Thom Jurek notes "Dickey's own timekeeping is also full of dynamic control and keeps the entire process of unfolding within the linguistic sensibilities of hard-swinging jazz."

The All About Jazz review by Clifford Allen states "Dickey is not, with this ensemble, presenting a dramatic new concept in improvised music, as his compositional style runs the gamut from driving free-bop to pastoral tone poems."

In a review for JazzTimes Chris Kelsey says "Dickey has a huge jazz percussion vocabulary. He swings in about as many ways as is possible, and he's got a fine touch and big ears."

== Track listing ==
All compositions by Whit Dickey

1. "Mojo Rising" – 12:08
2. "Coalescence" – 11:22
3. "Steam" – 8:24
4. "Coalescence 2" – 13:10

== Personnel ==
- Roy Campbell – trumpet
- Rob Brown – alto sax, flute
- Joe Morris – double bass
- Whit Dickey – drums
