= Marge Records =

French jazz record label

- Founded: 1975
- Founder: Gérard Terronès
- Genre: Free Jazz, Jazz
- Country of origin: FR
- Location: Paris, Lyon
- Official website: www.futuramarge.bandcamp.com

Marge Records, or Futura Marge, was a jazz record label created in France in 1973 by Gérard Terronès as a continuation of Futura Records. The label changed its name to Futura Marge in 2018.

== Discography ==
=== Blue Marge ===
1. Archie Shepp - Attica Blues (1979)
2. Roy Haynes - Live at the Riverbop (1979)
3. Abbey Lincoln - Painted Lady (1980)
4. François Cahen & Yochk'o Seffer - Ethnic Duo (1980)
5. Sam Rivers - Crosscurrent (1981)
6. Roger Raspail - Fanny's Dream (1997)
7. Raymond Boni - Terronès (2002)

=== Discography ===
1. Ted Curson – Cattin' Curson
2. Frank Lowe – Tricks of the Trade
3. Saheb Sarbib – Live in Europe Vol. 1
4. David Murray – Let the Music Take You
5. Willem Breuker – À Paris: Summer Music
6. Dave Burrell – Black Spring
7. John Tchicai & André Goudbeek – Barefoot Dance
8. Archie Shepp – Live at the Totem Vol : Things Have Got to Change
9. Billy Harper – The Awakening
10. Raymond Boni & Gérard Marais Concert au Totem
11. Sunny Murray Aigu–grave
12. Hervé Bourde Engatsse!
13. Stu Martin Sunrise
14. Roy Burrowes Live at the Dréher: Featuring Mal Waldron
15. Michel Edelin Flûtes Rencontre
16. Archie Shepp Live at the Totem Vol : 'Round About Midnight
17. Toninho Ramos Sons do Brasil
18. Philly Joe Jones Filet de Sole / Philly of Soul
19. Michel Graillier & Alby Cullaz [UNISSUED]
20. Sonny Sharrock Dance With Me, Montana
21. Marion Brown & Michel Graillier [UNISSUED]
22. Richard Davis Total Package
23. Abdelhaï Bennani Enfance
24. Rob Brown Visage
25. Outland Stentor
26. Eric Barret & Simon Goubert Linkage
27. Open Systems Open Systems
28. Sonny Simmons Mixolydis
29. Vega Live at Lézards
30. Rob Brown The Big Picture
31. Claudine François Lonely Woman
32. Arnaud Sacase Septentrion
33. Guérineau / Duboc / Lasserre [TER]
34. James Spaulding & Pierre Christophe Down With It / Live at the Sunside
35. Other Dimensions In Music Live at the Sunset
36. Laurent Geniez / Paco el Lobo / Octave Z Hors Pistes / Flamenco Nouveau
37. Trio Wha's Nine / Live at the Sunset
38. FAB trio (Fonda / Altschul / Bang) A Night in Paris / Live at the Sunset
39. Alexandra Grimal Shape / Live at the Sunset
40. Sophia Domancich / William Parker / Hamid Drake Washed Away / Live at the Sunside
41. Trio Passeurs Existences
42. Tribute to Albert Ayler Live at the Dynamo
43. Evan Parker / Barry Guy / Paul Lytton Nightwork / Live at the Sunset
44. Hal Singer featuring David Murray Challenge
45. Rob Brown Unexplained Phenomena
46. The Nu Band Relentlessness / Live at the Sunset
47. Open Loose Explicit / Live at the Sunset
48. Sophia Domancich / Mark Helias / Andrew Cyrille Courtepointe / Live at the Sunside
49. Claudine François / Hubert Dupont / Hamid Drake Flying Eagle
50. Richard Bonnet / Tony Malaby / Antonin Rayon / Tom Rainey Warrior

=== Futura Marge (Various Artists) ===
1. Futura Marge, Vol. 1 (2018)
2. Futura Marge, Vol. 2 (2019)
3. Futura Marge, Vol. 3 (2020)
