= Upgrade & Afterlife =

Studio album by Gastr del Sol
- Released: June 17, 1996
- Studio: Steam Room (Chicago, Illinois); Airwave (Park Ridge, Illinois); Streeterville (Chicago, Illinois); Soma (Chicago, Illinois)
- Genre: Avant-garde; post-rock
- Length: 49:12
- Label: Drag City

Gastr del Sol chronology
The Harp Factory on Lake Street (1995)	Upgrade & Afterlife (1996)	Camoufleur (1998)

Professional ratings
Review scores
Source	Rating
AllMusic	4/5 stars
Alternative Press	5/5
NME	4/10

Upgrade & Afterlife is the fourth studio album by American post-rock band Gastr del Sol, released on June 17, 1996, by Drag City.

The album cover is a photograph, Wasserstiefel (Water Boots) by Swiss artist Roman Signer.

== Composition ==
Pitchfork writer Nitsuh Abebe characterized Upgrade & Afterlife as a post-rock album where "folk and avant-garde abstract each other into something warm, minimal, and slanted".

"Our Exquisite Replica of "Eternity"" contains a sample of the score from the 1957 science fiction film The Incredible Shrinking Man. The title of the track is derived from the name of a cheap perfume marketed in public bathroom vending machines.

"Dry Bones in the Valley (I Saw the Light Come Shining 'Round and 'Round)" is a cover of a John Fahey song, and features Tony Conrad on violin. According to David Grubbs, the idea of having Conrad play on "Dry Bones in the Valley" came to fruition after a Gastr del Sol show in Atlanta, where Grubbs observed Conrad "literally dancing with excitement" while Jim O'Rourke played the song alone onstage as an encore.

Several sources misidentify track 3 as "The Sea Uncertain". This title, correctly rendered, appears to refer playfully both to a track on Gastr's previous full-length release titled "The C in Cake" and to one of Gastr percussionist John McEntire's other bands, the Sea and Cake, a moniker derived from McEntire's mishearing of that title.

== Track listing ==
All tracks are written by David Grubbs and Jim O'Rourke, except where noted.

No.	Title	Writer(s)	Length
1.	"Our Exquisite Replica of "Eternity""		8:26
2.	"Rebecca Sylvester"		3:53
3.	"The Sea Incertain"		6:12
4.	"Hello Spiral"		10:40
5.	"The Relay"		5:49
6.	"Crappie Tactics"		1:48
7.	"Dry Bones in the Valley (I Saw the Light Come Shining 'Round and 'Round)"	John Fahey	12:28
