= Other Dimensions in Music =

American free jazz group

- Genres: Free jazz
- Years active: 1981–present
- Members: Roy Campbell; Daniel Carter; William Parker; Rashid Bakr
- Website: www.aumfidelity.com/odim.html

Other Dimensions in Music is an American free jazz group founded in the 1980s.

The group is a collective quartet composed of trumpeter Roy Campbell, multi-instrumentalist Daniel Carter, bassist William Parker and drummer Rashid Bakr. Campbell, Parker and Bakr began working together as members of Jemeel Moondoc‘s group Muntu. Other Dimensions In Music came into existence when Carter joined them in 1981. Their third album, Time is of the Essence is Beyond Time is a live collaboration with pianist Matthew Shipp. On their next recording, Live at the Sunset, drummer Hamid Drake replaces Bakr. Kaiso Stories finds the quartet backing vocalist Fay Victor.

The group's music is entirely improvised but is generally more melodic than some listeners expect from free jazz.

== Members ==
- Rashid Bakr (drums)
- Roy Campbell Jr. (trumpet)
- Daniel Carter (saxophones, flute)
- William Parker (double bass)

=== Guest musicians ===
- Matthew Shipp (piano)

== Discography ==
- Other Dimensions In Music (Silkheart, 1990)
- Now! (Aum Fidelity, 1998)
- Time Is of the Essence Is Beyond Time (Aum Fidelity, 2000)
- Live at the Sunset (Marge, 2007)
- Kaiso Stories (Silkheart, 2011)
