= David Grubbs =

American musician

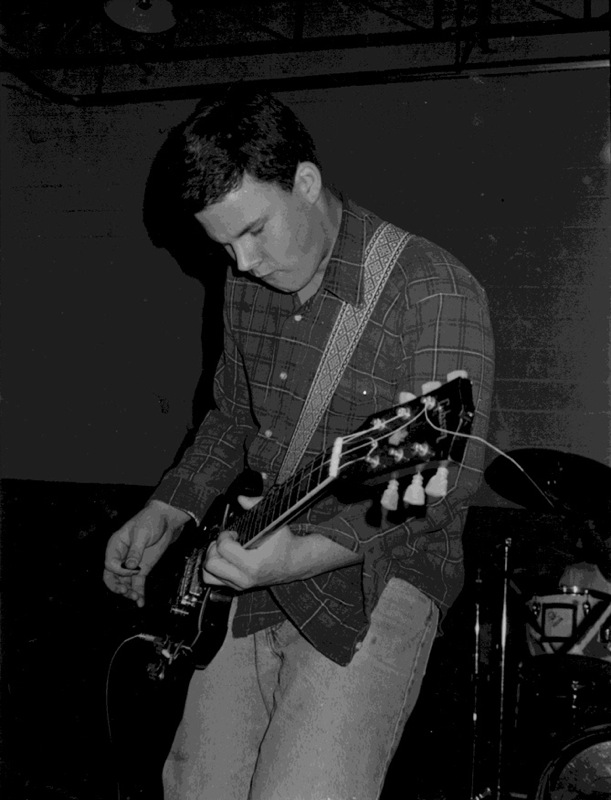
David Grubbs live in 1985 with Squirrel Bait

David Grubbs (born September 21, 1967) is an American composer, guitarist, pianist, and vocalist. He was a founding member of Squirrel Bait, Bastro, and Gastr del Sol. He has also played in Codeine, Red Krayola, Bitch Magnet and The Wingdale Community Singers.

== Music career ==
Grubbs' first band was a brief-lived punk/new wave group called The Happy Cadavers that released the four-song 7" record With Illustrations in 1982. Grubbs then formed a hardcore punk band called Squirrelbait Youth that later evolved into the influential Louisville, Kentucky group Squirrel Bait, releasing a 12" EP and an album on Homestead Records. Grubbs's next group was the post-punk power trio Bastro, which released an EP and two albums on Homestead. In 1991 Bastro morphed into the more avant-garde Gastr del Sol. This project soon became essentially a partnership between Grubbs and Jim O'Rourke after the band's first album. The albums released by the duo include Crookt, Crackt, or Fly, Upgrade & Afterlife, and Camoufleur. In this period, Grubbs also contributed to other projects, including guitar for two tracks on Codeine's 1994 album The White Birch and guitar, piano, and harmonium on recordings by Palace Music, Will Oldham, Royal Trux, Dirty Three, Matmos, Richard Buckner, Tony Conrad, Pauline Oliveros, Arnold Dreyblatt, and many others.

Since the breakup of Gastr del Sol in 1997, Grubbs has released numerous solo and collaborative records, mostly on the Drag City label, for which he co-directed the Dexter's Cigar sub-label. In 2000, his album The Spectrum Between was named "Album of the Year" in the Sunday Times.

His 2017 album Creep Mission was described by The Quietus as "a typically playful and intellectually ambitious set – and is as good an entry into the world of Grubbs as any."

In 2018, Grubbs released Failed Celestial Creatures, a collaboration with Japanese guitarist and electronic musician Taku Unami. According to Pitchfork, the album "feels of a piece with Grubbs’ last two records under his own name, Creep Mission and Prismrose, both nominal solo releases that each features a handful of guests. On all three albums, Grubbs uses the presence of collaborators to play with drones, repetition, and improvisatory interplay, taking his style to a more intuitive place."

He operates his own label, Blue Chopsticks, which has released new and archival recordings from Luc Ferrari, Derek Bailey and Noël Akchoté, Workshop, Van Oehlen, and Mats Gustafsson. Grubbs is also known for his collaborations with writers Susan Howe, Rick Moody, and Kenneth Goldsmith, and with visual artists including Anthony McCall, Angela Bulloch, Stephen Prina, and Cosima von Bonin. He has composed the soundtracks for Angela Bulloch's installations Z Point, Horizontal Technicolour, and Hybrid Song Box.4, and his music appears in two installations by Doug Aitken. Grubbs's sound installation "Between a Raven and a Writing Desk" was included in the 1999 group exhibition Elysian Fields at the Centre Pompidou.

Grubbs's soundtrack work includes music with Matmos for Thierry Jousse's feature film Invisible (Les Invisibles). Grubbs has also contributed music to the Red Krayola's soundtrack to Norman and Bruce Yonemoto's film Japan in Paris in LA and to three films by Augusto Contento (Parallax Sounds, Strade Trasparenti, and Onibus), to Braden King and Laura Moya's film Dutch Harbor: Where the Sea Breaks its Back, and to John Boskovich's film North. Music by Gastr del Sol appears in the PBS television series The United States of Poetry, Hal Hartley's film The Book of Life, and Doug Aitken's film The Diamond Sea. Grubbs composed the score for Karl Bruckmaier's radio adaptation of Peter Weiss's Die Ästhetik des Widerstands (Hessischer Rundfunk Hörbuch des Jahres 2007) and contributed music to Bruckmaier's adaptation of Alexander Kluge's Chronik der Gefühle (Deutscher Hörbuchpreis 2010, "Best Fiction").

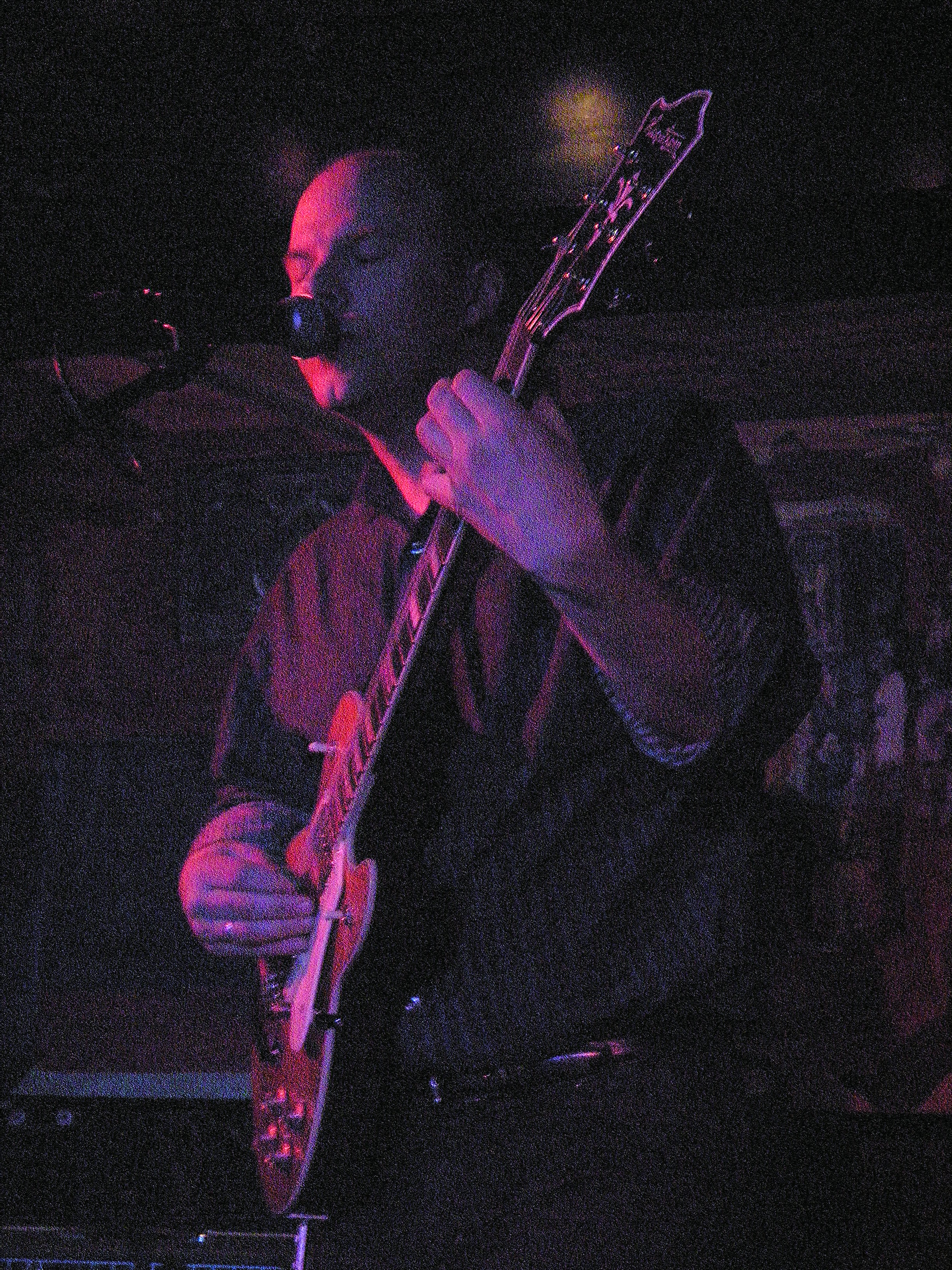
Grubbs solo in 2009.

From 1997 to 1999, Grubbs was a part-time instructor in the Liberal Arts and Sound departments at the School of the Art Institute of Chicago. He is currently Professor of Music in the Conservatory of Music at Brooklyn College, CUNY. He teaches in Brooklyn College's MFA program in Performance and Interactive Media Arts (PIMA) and Brooklyn College's MFA program in Creative Writing, and is a member of the faculty of the Brooklyn College Center for Computer Music (BC-CCM).

He is one of five musicians (with Steve Albini, Ken Vandermark, Damon Locks, and Ian Williams) profiled in Augusto Contento's 2012 documentary film Parallax Sounds.

== Academic career ==
Grubbs received a B.A. degree from Georgetown University, an A.M. degree from the University of Chicago in 1991, and a Ph.D. degree in English, also from Chicago, in 2005.

Grubbs is Distinguished Professor of Music at Brooklyn College and the Graduate Center, CUNY, specialised in sound art and experimental music, and teaching in performance arts, interactive art and creative writing. His criticism has appeared in Texte zur Kunst, Chicago Review, TDR, Conjunctions, Bookforum, and Purple, and from 1999-2007 he regularly contributed music criticism to the Munich newspaper Süddeutsche Zeitung. Grubbs received a 2005–2006 Foundation for Contemporary Arts Grants to Artists Award.

Grubbs is the author of four books for Duke University Press: Records Ruin the Landscape: John Cage, the Sixties, and Sound Recording (2014), Now that the audience is assembled (2018), The Voice in the Headphones (2020), and Good night the pleasure was ours (2022). Now that the audience is assembled was described by The Washington Post as "a new book-length poem [that] reminds us that listening can feel stranger than dreaming." Records Ruin the Landscape has appeared in French, Italian, and Japanese translations. Grubbs is also the co-author of the collaborative artists’ books Simultaneous Soloists (with Anthony McCall, Pioneer Works Press, 2019) and Projectile (with Reto Geiser and John Sparagana, Drag City, 2021).

== Personal life ==
Grubbs lives in Brooklyn with his wife, Cathy Bowman, and their son Emmett Bowman-Grubbs.

== Selected solo discography ==
- Whistle from Above LP/CD (Drag City, 2025)
- Creep Mission LP/CD (Drag City/Blue Chopsticks, 2017)
- Prismrose LP/CD (Drag City/Blue Chopsticks, 2016)
- Borough of Broken Umbrellas EP (Drag City, 2013)
- The Plain Where The Palace Stood LP/CD (Drag City/P-Vine, 2013)
- Hybrid Song Box.4 CD (Blue Chopsticks, 2009)
- An Optimist Notes the Dusk CD/LP (Drag City, P-Vine, 2008)
- Two Soundtracks for Angela Bulloch CD (Semishigure 2005)
- Yellow Sky split 12" picture disc with Åke Hodell (Kning Disk/Håll Tjäften, 2005)
- A Guess at the Riddle CD/LP (Drag City/Fat Cat/P-Vine 2004)
- Comic Structure LP with artist's edition by David Shrigley (En/Of, 2003)
- Crumbling Land split 12" with Avey Tare (Fat Cat Records, 2003)
- Rickets & Scurvy LP/CD (Drag City/Fat Cat/P-Vine, 2002)
- Act Five, Scene One (Blue Chopsticks/P-Vine, 2002)
- Thirty-Minute Raven CD (Rectangle/P-Vine, 2000)
- The Spectrum Between CD/LP (Drag City/P-Vine, 2000)
- "Aux Noctambules" 3" CD (Rectangle, 2000)
- The Coxcomb LP/picture disc (Rectangle, 1999)
- The Thicket CD/LP (Drag City, 1998)
- Banana Cabbage, Potato Lettuce, Onion Orange CD (Table of the Elements, 1997)

== Selected collaborations ==
- Failed Celestial Creatures with Taku Unami (Empty Editions, 2018)
- I Said No Doctors! with various artists (Dymaxion Groove, 2017)
- Frolic Architecture with Susan Howe CD (Blue Chopsticks, 2011)
- Souls of the Labadie Tract with Susan Howe CD (Blue Chopsticks, 2006)
- The Harmless Dust with Nikos Veliotis CD (Headz, 2005)
- Thiefth with Susan Howe CD (Blue Chopsticks, 2005)
- Off-Road with Mats Gustafsson CD (Blue Chopsticks, 2003)
- Arbovitae with Loren Connors CD (Häpna, 2003)
- Apertura with Mats Gustafsson CD (Blue Chopsticks, 1999)
