= Planet Dream =

Studio album by Steve Swell
- Released: 2009
- Recorded: February 10, 2008
- Studio: Newsonic, New York City
- Genre: Jazz
- Label: Clean Feed
- Producer: Steve Swell

Steve Swell chronology
Magical Listening Hour (2009)	Planet Dream (2009)	5000 Poems (2010)

Planet Dream is an album by American jazz trombonist Steve Swell which was recorded in 2008 and released on the Portuguese Clean Feed label. He leads a trio with Rob Brown on alto sax and Daniel Levin on cello.

== Background ==
Brown and Swell are long-time members of William Parker's Little Huey Creative Music Orchestra. They have also worked in smaller groups on the albums We Are Not Obstinate Islands by The Diplomats, a collaborative trio with drummer Harris Eisenstadt, and Radiant Pools, under Brown's leadership. Levin and Brown have worked in a trio with drummer Satoshi Takeishi, which recorded Sounds.

== Reception ==
In a double review for All About Jazz, Wilbur Mackenzie states "Swell has worked with cellist Dan Levin and saxophonist Rob Brown before in various contexts, but a tightly woven trio environment provides for a very exposed look at how three distinct identities can contribute to a meaningful whole while maintaining individual directionality."

== Track listing ==
All compositions by Swell / Brown / Levin except as indicated

1. "Out of the Box" – 5:20
2. "Not Necessarily This, Nor That" (Steve Swell) – 8:52
3. "Planet Dream" – 4:05
4. "Juxtsuppose" (Steve Swell) – 5:07
5. "#2 of Nine" – 4:26
6. "Airtight" (Steve Swell) – 5:51
7. "And Then They Wept" – 4:59
8. "City Life" – 4:38
9. "Texture #2" (Steve Swell) – 9:13

== Personnel ==
- Steve Swell – trombone
- Rob Brown – alto sax
- Daniel Levin - cello
