= Balance (Joe Morris album) =

Studio album by Joe Morris
- Released: 2014
- Recorded: December 13, 2013
- Studio: Brooklyn Recording, New York City
- Genre: Jazz
- Length: 55:47
- Label: Clean Feed
- Producer: Joe Morris

Joe Morris chronology
From the Discrete to the Particular (2012)	Balance (2014)	Mess Hall (2014)

Balance is an album by American jazz guitarist Joe Morris which was recorded in 2013 and released on the Portuguese Clean Feed label. It was the return of the quartet with violinist Mat Maneri, bassist Chris Lightcap and drummer Gerald Cleaver, the same lineup that recorded in the 90s Underthru and At the Old Office.

According to Morris, the album complete a three part series of recordings inspired by the influence of the visual arts. The series began with Colorfield and continued with Camera. This final part addresses the influence of 20th Century sculpture made by artists like Alexander Calder, Anthony Caro, David Smith and Richard Serra.

== Reception ==
Professional ratings
Review scores
Source	Rating
Down Beat	4/5 stars

The All About Jazz review by Glenn Astarita states "Among other positives, Morris' quartet is a unit you can count on for extending the limits of whatever improvisational model(s) they process, coinciding with the artists' dynamic interactions and dizzying rhythmical measures."

The Down Beat review by Bradley Bambarger notes that "Maneri’s viola sings and saws through imaginative solos and commentaries, and it blends wonderfully with the guitarist’s flinty single-note lines and harmonic shards, evoking whole worlds of music—not only shades of Ornette Coleman but abstractions of Africa, India and Appalachias."

== Track listing ==
1. "Thought" – 3:35
2. "Effort" – 11:22
3. "Trust" – 9:23
4. "Purpose" – 12:38
5. "Substance" – 6:36
6. "Meaning" – 12:13

== Personnel ==
- Joe Morris – guitar
- Mat Maneri – viola
- Chris Lightcap – bass
- Gerald Cleaver – drums
