= Itan =

Itan may refer to:

- The Yoruba mythology (traditional history, folklore and philosophy) of the Yoruba people
- Itan, a trade name used in Chile for a medication (Metoclopramide) used to treat digestive problems
- iTAN, Indexed Transaction authentication number
- "Itan", a song by Joe Morris from Flip and Spike
