= Today on Earth =

Studio album by Joe Morris
- Released: 2009
- Recorded: June 17, 2009
- Studio: West Studios, Charlestown, Massachusetts
- Genre: Jazz
- Length: 67:06
- Label: AUM Fidelity
- Producer: Joe Morris

Joe Morris chronology
Colorfield (2009)	Today on Earth (2009)	Tooth and Nail (2010)

Today on Earth is an album by American jazz guitarist Joe Morris, which was recorded in 2009 and released on the AUM Fidelity label. It was the second recording after Beautiful Existence by his quartet with alto saxophonist Jim Hobbs, bassist Timo Shanko and drummer Luther Gray.

== Reception ==
Professional ratings
Review scores
Source	Rating
AllMusic	4/5 stars

In his review for AllMusic, Phil Freeman states " Morris is a master of mixing total improvisational freedom with a realization that swing can be just as liberating as skronk, that a clean tone can say as much as, if not more than, a coruscating flood-tide of noise."

The All About Jazz review by Troy Collins says "A brilliant follow-up to Beautiful Existence, and considerably more accessible than some of his more abstract efforts, Today On Earth is a stellar highlight in an exceptional, eclectic discography."

The JazzTimes review by Scott Verrastro states "Today on Earth, his current quartet’s second album, may be one of Morris’ more accessible offerings, yet still contains the kind of challenging, jagged melodies and intuitive, spatial improvisations we’ve come to expect."

== Track listing ==
All compositions by Joe Morris

1. "Backbone" –10:46
2. "Animal" – 9:38
3. "Today on Earth" – 10:51
4. "Observer" – 11:40
5. "Embarrasement of Riches" – 6:47
6. "Ashes" – 7:51
7. "Imaginary Solutions" – 10:33

== Personnel ==
- Joe Morris - guitar
- Jim Hobbs – alto sax
- Timo Shanko – bass
- Luther Gray – drums
