= High Wire (Rob Brown album) =

Studio album by Rob Brown
- Released: 1996
- Recorded: July 22, 1993
- Studio: Tom Tedesco's Studio, Paramus, NJ
- Genre: Jazz
- Length: 59:24
- Label: Soul Note
- Producer: Flavio Bonandrini

Rob Brown chronology
Illuminate (1995)	High Wire (1996)	Blink of an Eye (1997)

High Wire is an album by the American jazz saxophonist Rob Brown, recorded in 1993 and released on the Italian Soul Note label. It features a trio with bassist William Parker and drummer Jackson Krall playing all original Brown compositions.

== Reception ==
Professional ratings
Review scores
Source	Rating
AllMusic	3/5 stars
The Penguin Guide to Jazz	3.5/4 stars

In his review for AllMusic, Brian Olewnick states: "Brown shows himself in full command of his horn and if, ultimately, High Wire is more a free blowing session than an exposition of ideas (the tunes are a bit sketchy and perfunctory), it's a solid, enjoyable one that fans of the downtown New York scene will want to own." The Penguin Guide to Jazz states: "The lider is in impressive form, with a further roster of fiery and more emotive pieces." In a double review for the Chicago Reader, Peter Margasak describes the album as superb, writing that "Brown is a magnificent hornman who's worked with adventurous musicians like pianist Matthew Shipp and guitarist Joe Morris, but he remains largely unknown."

== Track listing ==
All compositions by Rob Brown

1. "Hex Key" – 11:54
2. "Totter" – 7:39
3. "Revealing" – 7:38
4. "Just a Touch" – 11:51
5. "Turmoil" – 10:31
6. "Trickster" – 9:51

== Personnel ==
- Rob Brown – alto sax
- William Parker – bass
- Jackson Krall – drums
