= Live at Firehouse 12 =

Live album by Rob Brown
- Released: 2009
- Recorded: November 2, 2007
- Venue: Firehouse 12, New Haven
- Genre: Jazz
- Length: 44:39
- Label: Not Two

Rob Brown chronology
Crown Trunk Root Funk (2008)	Live at Firehouse 12 (2009)	Natural Disorder (2010)

Live at Firehouse 12 is an album by American jazz saxophonist Rob Brown recorded in 2007 and released on the Polish Not Two label. It features a trio with Brown on alto sax, Daniel Levin on cello and Japanese Satoshi Takeishi on percussion, the same band that released Sounds. The music was composed by Brown with help from a grant from Chamber Music America. The final track, "Stray(horn)", is a ballad dedicated to Billy Strayhorn.

== Reception ==
The All About Jazz review by Jeff Stockton states "Brown's band mates are masters of small gestures, which make their virtuosic flourishes all the more dramatic... Brown's tone is forceful and controlled even when his energy sends him on the attack."

== Track listing ==
All compositions by Rob Brown

1. "Quick Be Nimble" – 8:30
2. "Walkabout" – 14:39
3. "On a Lark" – 9:34
4. "Stray(horn)" – 11:56

== Personnel ==
- Rob Brown – alto sax
- Daniel Levin - cello
- Satoshi Takeishi – percussion
