= Color field (disambiguation) =

Color Field painting is a style of abstract painting that emerged during the 1940s and 1950s.

Color field or variants thereof may also refer to:

- The Colourfield, a British band formed in 1984
  - The Colour Field, a 1986 release by the band The Colourfield
- Color field (quantum chromodynamics), one of the fields in quantum chromodynamics
- Colorfield (album), a 2009 recording by jazz guitarist Joe Morris

== See also ==
- Color framing
