= Rebus (album) =

Studio album by Joe Morris
- Released: 2007
- Recorded: January 12, 2006
- Studio: Firehouse 12 Studios, New Haven
- Genre: Jazz
- Length: 57:50
- Label: Clean Feed
- Producer: Morris / Vandermark /Gray

Joe Morris chronology
Beautiful Existence (2005)	Rebus (2007)	High Definition (2008)

Ken Vandermark chronology
A Discontinuous Line (2006)	Rebus (2007)	Foreground Music (2007)

Rebus is an album by American jazz guitarist Joe Morris with reedist Ken Vandermark, who played tenor sax, and drummer Luther Gray. It was recorded in 2006 and released on the Portuguese Clean Feed label. Morris and Vandermark have recorded before on Like Rays, a trio date with pianist Hans Poppel. Morris also joined Vandermark's DKV Trio on Deep Telling.

== Reception ==
Professional ratings
Review scores
Source	Rating
The Penguin Guide to Jazz Recordings	3.5/4 stars

In his review for All About Jazz Andrey Henkin states "The music contained on Rebus, a word defined as a representation, is fascinating for its perpendicular nature. With Luther Gray's solid and expansive drumming, Morris and Vandermark play against each other, the former working vertically while the latter moves horizontally."

== Track listing ==
All compositions by Morris / Vandermark / Gray

1. "Rebus 1" – 10:37
2. "Rebus 2" – 10:03
3. "Rebus 3" – 5:37
4. "Rebus 4" – 5:45
5. "Rebus 5" – 12:49
6. "Rebus 6" – 12:59

== Personnel ==
- Joe Morris - guitar
- Ken Vandermark – tenor sax
- Luther Gray – drums
