= You Be Me =

Studio album by Joe Morris
- Released: 1997
- Recorded: August 22, 1995
- Studio: The Outpost, Stoughton, MA
- Genre: Jazz
- Length: 65:39
- Label: Soul Note
- Producer: Joe Morris

Joe Morris chronology
Elsewhere (1996)	You Be Me (1997)	Invisible Weave (1997)

You Be Me is an album by the American jazz guitarist Joe Morris, recorded in 1995 and released on the Italian Soul Note label. For the record, Morris expanded to a quartet consisting of the trio with whom he recorded Symbolic Gesture, with the addition of violinist Mat Maneri.

== Reception ==
Professional ratings
Review scores
Source	Rating
The Penguin Guide to Jazz	3/4 stars

In an article for the Boston Phoenix, Ed Hazell noted that the group possessed "flexible interconnections that stretch and bend but never break. They hold most tightly together at precisely those moments it seems they must fly apart. This sense of communion comes from more than craft; its origins lie in a fundamental spirituality at the heart of music in the African-American tradition."

The JazzTimes review by Harvey Pekar states: "The quartet does some good pointillistic work, illustrating their ability to listen and defer to each other."

== Track listing ==
All compositions by Joe Morris

1. "You Be Me" – 11:47
2. "Deep Discount" – 7:16
3. "Transmitter" – 6:27
4. "The Object of Color" – 11:48
5. "Real Reason" – 12:05
6. "Adult Themes" – 10:11
7. "Glider" – 6:05

== Personnel ==
- Joe Morris - guitar
- Mat Maneri – violin
- Nate McBride – bass
- Curt Newton – drums
