= Blink of an Eye (Rob Brown and Matthew Shipp album) =

Live album by Rob Brown and Matthew Shipp
- Released: 1997
- Recorded: October 12, 1996
- Venues: Roulette, New York City
- Genre: Jazz
- Length: 69:55
- Label: No More
- Producer: Alan Schneider

Rob Brown chronology
High Wire (1996)	Blink of an Eye (1997)	Orbit (1997)

Blink of an Eye is an album by American jazz saxophonist Rob Brown which was recorded live in 1996 and released on No More, the label founded by producer Alan Schneider. The album features a duo performance with pianist Matthew Shipp nearly a decade after they played together on their debut recording, Sonic Explorations. They reunited in June 1996 as part of the Vision Festival and Brown asked Shipp to share his evening at Roulette. This is the first documented recording of Rob playing flute.

== Reception ==
Professional ratings
Review scores
Source	Rating
AllMusic	4.5/5 stars
The Penguin Guide to Jazz	3/4 stars

In his review for AllMusic, Thom Jurek states "Everything is full-speed ahead, though there are dynamic breaks and continuances and the unfolding of dramatic tonal architectures that are layered in such textured balance that they create a towering, yet gentle perceived aural structure."

The Penguin Guide to Jazz says that "Shipp and Brown specifically avoid the obvious Taylor-Lyons comparisons, but they have insufficient material at their fingertips to justify a format which calls for the highest levels of improvisational finesse."

== Track listing ==
All compositions by Rob Brown and Matthew Shipp

1. "Blink of an Eye part 1" – 28:44
2. "Blink of an Eye part 2" – 32:27
3. "Blink of an Eye part 3" – 8:44

== Personnel ==
- Rob Brown – alto sax, flute
- Matthew Shipp – piano
