= Thesis (Matthew Shipp and Joe Morris album) =

Studio album by Matthew Shipp
- Released: 1997
- Recorded: January 23, 1997
- Studio: Seltzer Sound, New York City
- Genre: Jazz
- Length: 63:27
- Label: hatOLOGY
- Producer: Art Lange, Pia & Werner X. Uehlinger

Matthew Shipp chronology
By the Law of Music (1997)	Thesis (1997)	The Multiplication Table (1998)

Thesis is an album by the American jazz pianist Matthew Shipp, featuring a duo with guitarist Joe Morris, recorded in 1997 and released on the Swiss hatOLOGY label. Shipp played previously with the Joe Morris Ensemble on the album Elsewhere, but Thesis represents their first collaboration with Shipp as a leader.

== Reception ==
Professional ratings
Review scores
Source	Rating
AllMusic	4/5 stars
The Penguin Guide to Jazz Recordings	2.5/4 stars
(The New) Rolling Stone Album Guide	3/5 stars

In his review for AllMusic, Thom Jurek states: "What exists between them is a fiery lyricism replete with staggering arpeggios, colorful digressions of dualistic chromaticism combined with the stagger-and-lurch method of self-discovery in the midst of heated contrapuntal improvisation."

In an article for the Boston Phoenix, Ed Hazell wrote that "the pair seem guided not by conscious design but by more mysterious and powerful forces. Which isn't to say there's not a high level of conscious artistry present in this darkly beautiful, even majestic, album."

== Track listing ==
All compositions by Matthew Shipp

1. "Thesis" – 4:08
2. "Fable" – 5:39
3. "Simple Relations" – 3:41
4. "Particle 1" – 3:43
5. "The Wand" – 3:49
6. "Action and Reaction" – 5:22
7. "Center Of" – 5:33
8. "The Turnpike" – 5:35
9. "Form of Y" – 4:22
10. "Broader Orders" – 8:01
11. "Particle 2" – 4:41
12. "The Middle Region" – 4:18
13. "Our Journey" – 4:35

== Personnel ==
- Matthew Shipp – piano
- Joe Morris – guitar
