= Breath Rhyme =

Studio album by Rob Brown
- Released: 1990
- Recorded: April 28 & 29, 1989
- Studio: Sound on Sound, New York
- Genre: Jazz
- Length: 47:14 (LP); 65:32 (CD)
- Label: Silkheart
- Producer: Rob Brown

Rob Brown chronology
Sonic Explorations (1988)	Breath Rhyme (1990)	Youniverse (1992)

Breath Rhyme is an album by American jazz saxophonist Rob Brown recorded in 1989 and released on the Swedish Silkheart label.

== Background ==
After his debut album co-led with pianist Matthew Shipp, Sonic Explorations, which was privately recorded and then sold, this was his first real studio date. It features a trio with bassist William Parker and drummer Denis Charles playing all original Brown compositions. Parker and Charles had worked together a lot before, with Jemeel Moondoc and some other bands. Brown first played with Parker in a trio with drummer Frank Bambara in 1987. He put together the trio with Parker and Charles for a gig at the Knitting Factory the same year.

== Reception ==
Professional ratings
Review scores
Source	Rating
AllMusic	4/5 stars
The Penguin Guide to Jazz	3.5/4 stars

In his review for AllMusic, Scott Yanow says about the trio that "is a throwback in ways to the intense projects recorded by the ESP label in the 1960s, but it is also more modern, looking toward Cecil Taylor."

The Penguin Guide to Jazz states "Brown first record looked back to the frantic avant-gardism of the '60s and forward to a new, third way approach which combine that freedom and radicalism of purpose with a more melodic and expressive idiom."

The Cadence Magazine review by Carl Baugher says about the album that "It makes a strong case for Brown's place amongst today's better alto improvisers and is another unqualified winner for Silkheart".

== Track listing ==
All compositions by Rob Brown

1. "Firewalk" – 10:50
2. "Stillness" – 5:58
3. "Breath Rhyme" – 7:31
4. "PB" – 10:47
5. "The Light" – 4:47
6. "Beehive" – 11:33
7. "Awake" – 7:28
8. "Escape Velocity" – 6:38

3 & 4 does not appear on original LP

== Personnel ==
- Rob Brown – alto sax
- William Parker – bass
- Denis Charles – drums
