= Rob Brown (saxophonist) =

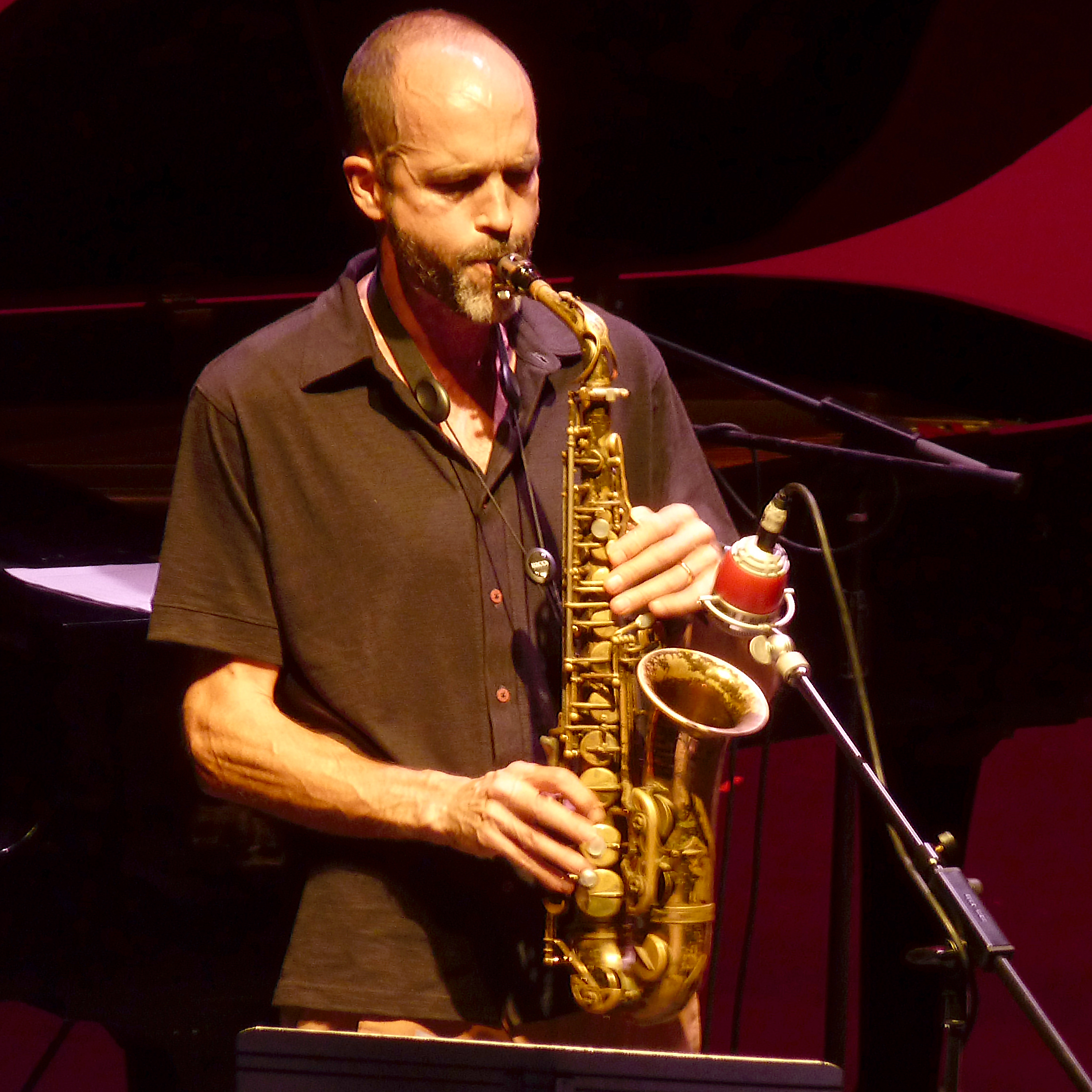

Background information
- Born: Rob Brown; February 27, 1962 (age 64)
- Origin: Hampton, Virginia, U.S.
- Genres: Jazz free jazz avant-garde jazz free improvisation
- Occupation: Musician
- Instrument: Alto sax
- Years active: 1987–present
- Labels: Aum Fidelity, Clean Feed Records, No More, Not Two, Marge Records, RogueArt, Riti
- Website: Official Website

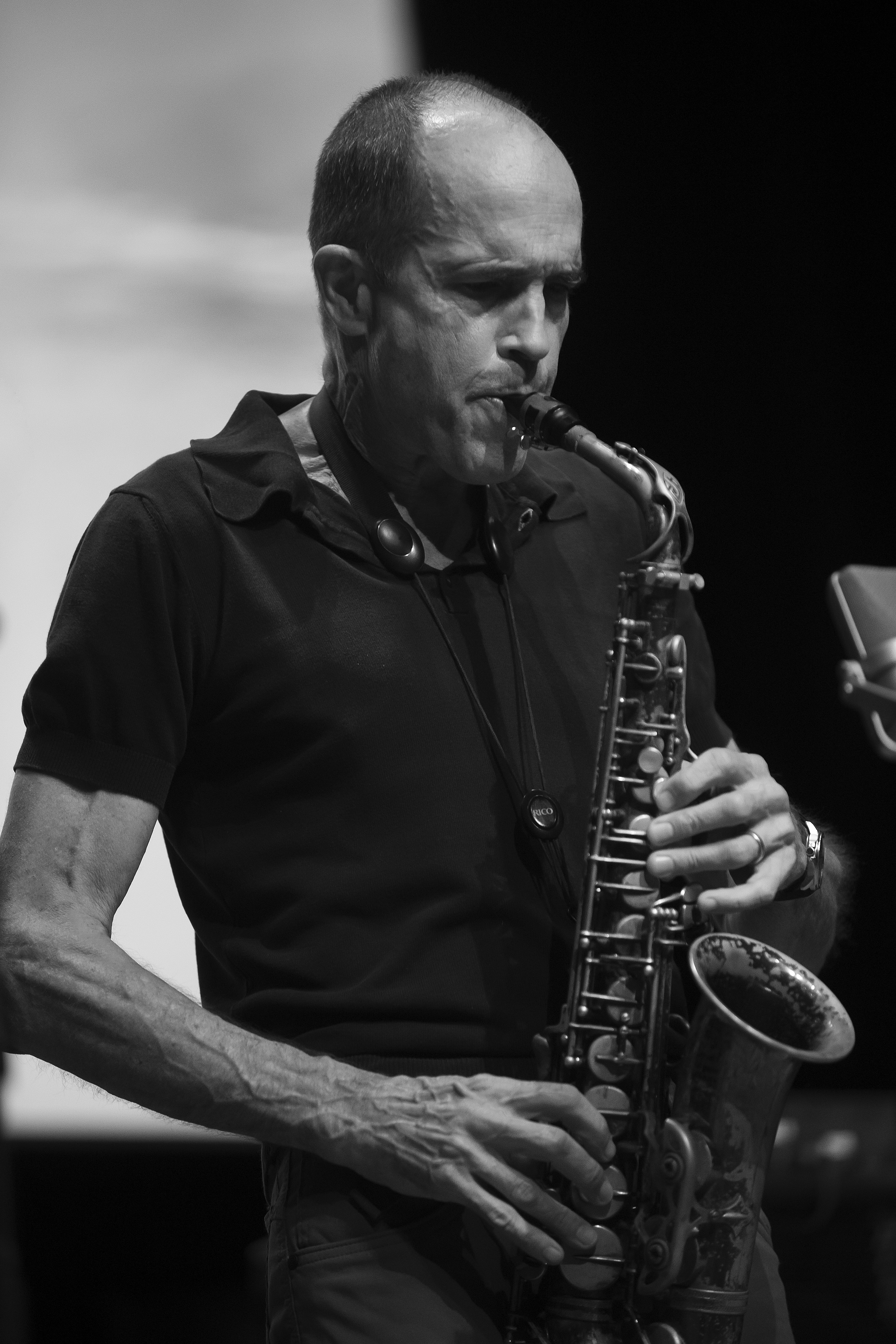
Rob Brown, Arts for Art - Vision Festival 2024. Foto by Marek Lazarski

Rob Brown (born February 27, 1962) is an American free jazz saxophonist and composer.

== Life and career ==
Brown was born in Hampton, Virginia on February 27, 1962. He started playing saxophone at the age of 12. His first gigs were with a local Virginia swing band. He eventually studied at Berklee College for two years, and worked privately with both Joe Viola and John LaPorta. After a year on the west coast, Brown relocated to Boston, Massachusetts, where he met pianist Matthew Shipp. He moved to New York in 1985, where he enrolled at New York University, earned a music degree, and studied with saxophone masters such as Lee Konitz, but the teacher who had more influence on Brown conceptually was Philadelphian Dennis Sandole. Brown travelled to Philadelphia by rail once a week to study with him for a year and a half.

His first issued recording was the duet with Shipp Sonic Explorations (1988), and since then has been actively leading groups or working as a sideman with Shipp, William Parker, Whit Dickey, Joe Morris and Steve Swell.

He is a 2001 CalArts/Alpert/Ucross Residency Prize winner and has received many Meet The Composer Fund grants. In 2006, Brown was awarded a Chamber Music America New Works grant.

== Discography ==
=== As leader/co-leader ===
Release year	Title	Label	Personnel/Notes
1988	Sonic Explorations	Cadence Jazz	Duo with Matthew Shipp (piano)
1990	Breath Rhyme	Silkheart	Trio with William Parker (bass), Denis Charles (drums)
1992	Youniverse	Riti	Trio with Joe Morris (guitar), Whit Dickey (drums)
1995	Illuminate	Leo	Quartet co-led by Joe Morris (guitar), with William Parker (bass), Jackson Krall (drums)
1996	High Wire	Soul Note	Trio with William Parker (bass), Jackson Krall (drums)
1997	Blink of an Eye	No More	Duo with Matthew Shipp (piano)
1997	Orbit	Music & Arts	Collaborative trio with Guerino Mazzola (piano), Heinz Geisser (percussion)
1998	Scratching the Surface	CIMP	Quartet co-led by Lou Grassi (drums), with Assif Tsahar (tenor sax), Chris Lightcap (bass)
2000	Visage	Marge	Trio with Wilber Morris (bass), Lou Grassi (drums, percussion)
2000	Jumping Off the Page	No More	Quartet with Roy Campbell (trumpet), Chris Lightcap (bass), Jackson Krall (drums)
2002	Round the Bend	Bleu Regard	Trio with William Parker (bass), Warren Smith (drums)
2003	Likewise	Riti	As part of the band Stone House; trio with Luther Gray (drums), Joe Morris (bass)
2004	The Big Picture	Marge	Quartet with Roy Campbell (trumpet, flugelhorn), William Parker (bass), Hamid Drake (drums)
2005	Radiant Pools	RogueArt	Quartet with Steve Swell (trombone), Joe Morris (bass), Luther Gray (drums)
2006	We Are Not Obstinate Islands	Clean Feed	As part of the band The Diplomats; trio with Steve Swell (trombone), Harris Eisenstadt (drums)
2007	Sounds	Clean Feed	Trio with Daniel Levin (cello), Satoshi Takeishi (percussion)
2008	Right Hemisphere	RogueArt	As part of the band Right Hemisphere; quartet with Matthew Shipp (piano), Joe Morris (bass), Whit Dickey (drums)
2008	Live in Chicago	Ruby Red	Duo with Andrew Barker (drums, percussion)
2008	Crown Trunk Root Funk	AUM Fidelity	Quartet with Craig Taborn (piano, electronics), William Parker (bass), Gerald Cleaver (drums)
2009	Live at Firehouse 12	Not Two	Trio with Daniel Levin (cello), Satoshi Takeishi (percussion)
2010	Natural Disorder	Not Two	Duo with Daniel Levin (cello)
2011	Unexplained Phenomena	Marge	Quartet with Matt Moran (vibraphone), Chris Lightcap (bass), Gerald Cleaver (drums)
2011	Unknown Skies	RogueArt	Trio with Craig Taborn (piano), Nasheet Waits (drums)
2014	Day in the Life of a City	Multikulti	Trio with Daniel Levin (cello), Jacek Mazurkiewicz (bass)
2015	Divergent Paths	Cipsela	Duo with Daniel Levin (cello)

=== As sideman ===
Release year	Leader	Title	Label
1998	Whit Dickey	Transonic	AUM Fidelity
2000	Whit Dickey	Big Top	Wobbly Rail
2001	Whit Dickey	Life Cycle	AUM Fidelity
2001	Alan Silva	Alan Silva & the Sound Visions Orchestra	Eremite
2002	Whit Dickey	Prophet Moon	Riti
2004	Whit Dickey	Coalescence	Clean Feed
2005	Whit Dickey	In a Heartbeat	Clean Feed
2006	Whit Dickey	Sacred Ground	Clean Feed
1999	Joe Morris	Many Rings	Knitting Factory
1994	William Parker	Flowers Grow in My Room	Centering
1995	William Parker	In Order to Survive	Black Saint
1996	William Parker	Compassion Seizes Bed-Stuy	Homestead
1997	William Parker	Sunrise in the Tone World	AUM Fidelity
1998	William Parker	The Peach Orchard	AUM Fidelity
1999	William Parker	Posium Pendasem	FMP
2000	William Parker	O'Neal's Porch	Centering
2000	William Parker	Mayor of Punkville	AUM Fidelity
2002	William Parker	Raincoat in the River	Eremite
2002	William Parker	Raining on the Moon	Thirsty Ear
2002	William Parker	Spontaneous	Splasc(h)
2003	William Parker	Mass for the Healing of the World	Black Saint
2005	William Parker	Sound Unity	AUM Fidelity
2005	William Parker	For Percy Heath	Victo
2007	William Parker	Corn Meal Dance	AUM Fidelity
2007	William Parker	Alphaville Suite	RogueArt
2007	William Parker	Double Sunrise Over Neptune	AUM Fidelity
2008	William Parker	Petit Oiseau	AUM Fidelity
2012	William Parker	Essence of Ellington	Centering
2013	William Parker	Wood Flute Songs	AUM Fidelity
1992	Matthew Shipp	Points	Silkheart
1999	Matthew Shipp	Magnetism	Bleu Regard
2009	Steve Swell	Planet Dream	Clean Feed
