= The Multiplication Table =

Studio album by Matthew Shipp
- Released: 1998
- Recorded: July 17, 1997
- Studio: Seltzer Sound, New York City
- Genre: Jazz
- Length: 60:47
- Label: hatOLOGY
- Producer: Art Lange, Pia & Werner X. Uehlinger

Matthew Shipp chronology
| Thesis (1997) | The Multiplication Table (1998) | Strata (1998) |

The Multiplication Table is an album by the American jazz pianist Matthew Shipp, recorded in 1997 and released on the Swiss hatOLOGY label.

The album features a trio with longtime partner William Parker on bass and newcomer Susie Ibarra on drums, who at the time were the rhythm section for the David S. Ware Quartet. Shipp covers three standards, Joseph Kosma's "Autumn Leaves", Duke Ellington's "C Jam Blues" and Billy Strayhorn's "Take the 'A' Train".

== Reception ==
Professional ratings
Review scores
| Source | Rating |
|---|---|
| AllMusic | 5/5 stars |
| The Penguin Guide to Jazz | 3/4 stars |
| (The New) Rolling Stone Album Guide | 4/5 stars |

In his review for AllMusic, Thom Jurek states: "The Multiplication Table is, along with a previous Hat release, By the Law of Music with strings, Shipp's masterpiece thus far. Mr. Shipp may be the most exciting composer/pianist since Herbie Nichols." By contrast, The Penguin Guide to Jazz wrote that the album "is sometimes as dry as its title" and notes that "the problem is with the recording, which has the piano too far back, the drums too far forward and the bass often loss."

== Track listing ==
All compositions by Matthew Shipp except as indicated

1. "Autumn Leaves" (Joseph Kosma) – 8:10
2. "The New Fact" – 4:43
3. "The C Jam Blues" (Duke Ellington) – 13:09
4. "ZT 1" – 5:25
5. "Take the A Train" (Billy Strayhorn) – 6:56
6. "ZT 2" – 4:26
7. "The Multiplication Table" – 13:07
8. "ZT 3" – 4:51

== Personnel ==
- Matthew Shipp – piano
- William Parker – bass
- Susie Ibarra – drums
