= The Big Picture (Rob Brown album) =

Studio album by Rob Brown
- Released: 2004
- Recorded: January 16, 2003
- Studio: Studios de la Seine, Paris
- Genre: Jazz
- Length: 63:05
- Label: Marge
- Producer: Gérard Terronès

Rob Brown chronology
Likewise (2003)	The Big Picture (2004)	Radiant Pools (2005)

The Big Picture is an album by American jazz saxophonist Rob Brown recorded in 2003 and released on the French Marge label. It features a quartet with trumpeter Roy Campbell, bassist Willam Parker and drummer Hamid Drake. These four musicians were in Paris to play at the 2003 edition of the Sons d'Hiver festival with two different bands: Campbell's Pyramid Trio and Parker's Raining on the Moon quintet, and producer Gérard Terronès got them into the studio.

== Reception ==
The All About Jazz review by Rex Butters states "These four veteran collaborators create their signature sound of abundant grace, heartbreaking beauty, and righteous swing bleeding blues."

== Track listing ==
All compositions by Rob Brown

1. "Dawning" – 9:38
2. "Islands of Space" – 10:11
3. "Wyoming Song" – 11:01
4. "Trio Unsprung" – 7:42
5. "Blues Thicket" – 10:10
6. "Legroom" – 14:23

== Personnel ==
- Rob Brown – alto sax, flute
- Roy Campbell - trumpet, pocket trumpet, flugelhorn
- William Parker – bass
- Hamid Drake – drums
