= Youniverse (Rob Brown album) =

Studio album by Rob Brown
- Released: 1992
- Recorded: June 28, 1992
- Studio: Water Music, Hoboken, NJ
- Genre: Jazz
- Length: 64:55
- Label: Riti
- Producer: Rob Brown, Whit Dickey

Rob Brown chronology
Breath Rhyme (1989)	Youniverse (1992)	Illuminate (1995)

Youniverse is an album by American jazz saxophonist Rob Brown recorded in 1992 and released on the Riti label, operated by free jazz musician and composer Joe Morris. It features a trio with Morris on guitar and Whit Dickey on drums playing six Brown compositions and two collective improvisations. The same lineup would be named Trio Ahxoloxha when they released the album Prophet Moon a decade later under the leadership of Dickey.

== Reception ==
Professional ratings
Review scores
Source	Rating
The Penguin Guide to Jazz	3/4 stars

The Penguin Guide to Jazz says about the album compared to the previous Breath Rhyme that "the result is a clearer, more songful music that retains its intensity."

== Track listing ==
All compositions by Rob Brown except as indicated

1. "Youniverse" – 6:09
2. "Mikro" – 8:24
3. "Kingpin" – 7:17
4. "Imprint 1" (Rob Brown, Joe Morris, Whit Dickey) – 11:55
5. "Inside Break" – 5:22
6. "Sonic Film" – 9:06
7. "Imprint 2" (Rob Brown, Joe Morris, Whit Dickey) – 9:00
8. "Svengali" – 7:31

== Personnel ==
- Rob Brown – alto sax
- Joe Morris – guitar
- Whit Dickey – drums
