= Antennae (album) =

Studio album by Joe Morris
- Released: 1997
- Recorded: July 5 & 6, 1997
- Studio: The Outpost, Stoughton, MA
- Genre: Jazz
- Length: 73:59
- Label: AUM Fidelity
- Producer: Joe Morris, Steven Joerg

Joe Morris chronology
Invisible Weave (1997)	Antennae (1997)	Racket Club (1998)

Antennae is an album by the American jazz guitarist Joe Morris, recorded in 1997 and released on the AUM Fidelity label. It features a trio with Jerome Deupree, who was the original drummer in the rock band Morphine and played with Morris on some of his early Riti albums, and bassist Nate McBride. The pieces on Antennae took their inspiration from a collection of visual graphic aids created by Lowell Davidson, a pianist with whom Morris worked fairly extensively before his death in 1990.

Regarding the track titled "Stare Into a Lightbulb for Three Years," Morris stated that, given Davidson's background as a biochemist, "I figured he was always trying to reconstitute the biochemistry of his brain. The story of him staring into a lightbulb for three years is something he actually did. This chrome painted lightbulb, with little dots on a piece of aluminum foil, he stared into it so that the shapes, as he said, would burn into his synapses."

== Reception ==
Professional ratings
Review scores
Source	Rating
AllMusic	4/5 stars
DownBeat	4/5 stars
The Penguin Guide to Jazz	3/4 stars

The Penguin Guide to Jazz states: "The tracks on Antennae are among the most intense Morris has produced. He seems more inclined to dwell on notes and to explore the light and shade that gather between attack and delay." The DownBeat review by John Corbett thought that "Antennae is a rich trio outing from Morris, who continues to stretch jazz guitar into strange, beautiful new shapes."

== Track listing ==
All compositions by Joe Morris

1. "Synapse" – 8:17
2. "Antennae" – 13:21
3. "Silent Treatment" – 7:35
4. "Stare Into a Lightbulb for Three Years" – 13:30
5. "Human Pyramid" – 9:22
6. "Elevator" – 15:09
7. "Virtual Whatever" – 6:45

== Personnel ==
- Joe Morris - guitar
- Nate McBride – bass
- Jerome Deupree – drums
