= Singularity (Joe Morris album) =

Studio album by Joe Morris
- Released: 2001
- Recorded: May 10, 2000
- Studio: Sharon, Massachusetts
- Genre: Jazz
- Length: 44:00
- Label: AUM Fidelity

Joe Morris chronology
At the Old Office (2000)	Singularity (2001)	Age of Everything (2002)

Singularity is a solo album by American jazz guitarist Joe Morris, which was recorded in 2000 and released on the AUM Fidelity label.

== Reception ==
Professional ratings
Review scores
Source	Rating
AllMusic	4/5 stars
The Penguin Guide to Jazz	3.5/4 stars

In his review for AllMusic, Glenn Astarita states "the guitarist's beaming individuality comes to prominence on this expertly and altogether fascinating exhibition consisting of jarring single note lines, fragmented micro-themes, abstract blues-based motifs, and rapid fire chord progressions."

The Penguin Guide to Jazz notes that "The themes are all quite abstract but the playing remains close to the blues and to jazz harmony and Morris's ability to keep several ideas in sight at once means that Singularity is almost inexhaustible as a listening experience."

In his review for JazzTimes Daniel Piotrowski notes that "Singularity is a breathtaking chops exercise, but not as compelling as an album."

== Track listing ==
All compositions by Joe Morris

1. "Light" – 5:59
2. "Gravity" – 2:53
3. "Creature" – 3:46
4. "Shape" - 3:58
5. "Atmosphere" – 5:34
6. "Sense" – 4:50
7. "Liquid" – 3:24
8. "Dimension" - 4:23
9. "Flight" – 5:18
10. "Rock" – 3:55

== Personnel ==
- Joe Morris - steel string acoustic guitar
