= High Definition (Joe Morris album) =

Studio album by Joe Morris
- Released: 2008
- Recorded: December 15, 2007
- Studio: Firehouse 12, New Haven
- Genre: Jazz
- Length: 53:25
- Label: hatOLOGY
- Producer: Joe Morris

Joe Morris chronology
Rebus (2007)	High Definition (2008)	Elm City Duets (2008)

High Definition is an album by American jazz musician Joe Morris which was recorded in 2007 and released on the Swiss hatOLOGY label. Morris plays double bass instead of guitar. It was the debut recording by his Bass Quartet featuring trumpeter Taylor Ho Bynum, saxophonist Allan Chase and drummer Luther Gray. Chase played previously with the rhythm section composed of Morris and Gray on pianist Steve Lantner's quartet.

== Reception ==
Professional ratings
Review scores
Source	Rating
Down Beat	4/5 stars

The All About Jazz review by Glenn Astarita states "With the undeniably synergistic interplay of the ensemble, Morris pursues a striking balance between ultra-modern mainstream, and avant-garde tinged progressive jazz."

In his review for The New York Times, Ben Ratliff notes that "High Definition is more traditional than most of Mr. Morris's albums, and not only because it recalls 50-year-old sources. It's also because Mr. Morris is more conventional as a bass player than he is as a guitarist."

The Down Beat review by Peter Margasak says that "the real accomplishment on High Definition is how Morris fits invisibly in the group flow, particularly with drummer Luther Gray. Together, they mete out an imperturbable pulse."

== Track listing ==
All compositions by Joe Morris

1. "Skeleton" – 8:21
2. "Morning Group" – 8:22
3. "Land Mass" – 7:50
4. "Topics" – 6:53
5. "Bearing" – 4:31
6. "All-In_One" – 8:13
7. "Super Spot" – 3:51
8. "The Air Has Color" – 5:18

== Personnel ==
- Taylor Ho Bynum – cornet, trumpet, flugelhorn
- Allan Chase – alto sax, baritone sax, soprano sax
- Joe Morris - double bass
- Luther Gray – drums
