= Invisible Weave =

Live album

Live album by Joe Morris
- Released: 1997
- Recorded: January 10, 1997
- Venue: Knitting Factory, New York City
- Genre: Jazz
- Length: 75:56
- Label: No More
- Producer: Alan Schneider

Joe Morris chronology
You Be Me (1997)	Invisible Weave (1997)	Antennae (1997)

Invisible Weave is an album by American jazz guitarist Joe Morris featuring a duo performance with bassist William Parker, which was recorded live at the Knitting Factory in 1997 and released on No More, a label founded by producer Alan Schneider.

== Reception ==
The JazzTimes review by Bret Primack states "Morris can play with a bluesy swagger, or, as out as an Albert Ayler picnic. A charter member of the Boston Improviser's Group, his sense of freedom manifests itself musically in stark, abstract ways." In Jazziz Steve Hoffje wrote "The music is deceptively dense and intricate... This collaboration yields an introverted album, but listeners who burrow into its dense sound will find many bright epiphanies".

== Track listing ==
All compositions by Morris/Parker

1. "Hypnotext" – 10:34
2. "Viewer" – 12:59
3. "Standing Figure" – 12:30
4. "Spectralt" – 4:23
5. "To the Sensory" – 7:02
6. "Invisible Weave #1" – 16:37
7. "Invisible Weave #2" – 11:51

== Personnel ==
- Joe Morris - guitar
- William Parker – bass
