= Baraka (album) =

Studio album by DKV Trio
- Released: 1997
- Recorded: February 17 & 19, 1997
- Studio: Überstudio, Chicago
- Genre: Jazz
- Length: 71:41
- Label: Okka Disk
- Producer: Ken Vandermark

Ken Vandermark chronology
All Night Burner (1997)	Baraka (1997)	Like Rays (1998)

Baraka is an album by the DKV Trio, composed of drummer Hamid Drake, bassist Kent Kessler and reedist Ken Vandermark. It was recorded in 1997 and released on Okka Disk.

The DKV Trio was assembled by Vandermak in the summer of 1994 for the recording project Standards. The band's first album was the limited edition CD DKV Live, recorded on December 26, 1996, at the Chicago Lunar Cabaret and also released on Okka Disk.

== Reception ==
Professional ratings
Review scores
Source	Rating
AllMusic	4/5 stars
The Penguin Guide to Jazz	3.5/4 stars

In her review for AllMusic, Joslyn Layne states: "Baraka may suffer a bit in comparison to the later, extraordinary Live in Wels & Chicago, but it's still a terrific showcase of the trio and, overall, a great adventurous jazz album."

The Penguin Guide to Jazz notes that "Baraka has its moments of stasis -the title track runs for more than 35 minutes, and it needs plenty of resources to sustain that- but there is still an awful lot to listen to."

== Track listing ==
All compositions by Drake/Kessler/Vandermark

1. "Double Holiday" – 10:46
2. "Soft Gamma Ray Repeater" – 8:14
3. "Baraka" – 35:58
4. "Figure It Out" – 7:16
5. "Consequence" – 9:27

== Personnel ==
- Hamid Drake - drums
- Kent Kessler - bass
- Ken Vandermark - reeds
