= Round the Bend (album) =

Studio album by Rob Brown
- Released: 2002
- Recorded: May 30, 2001
- Studio: Seltzer Sound, New York City
- Genre: Jazz
- Length: 64:33
- Label: Bleu Regard
- Producer: Michel Dorbon

Rob Brown chronology
Jumping Off the Page (2000)	Round the Bend (2002)	Likewise (2003)

Round the Bend is an album by American jazz saxophonist Rob Brown recorded in 2001 and released on the French Bleu Regard label. It features a trio with bassist William Parker and drummer Warren Smith.

== Reception ==
Professional ratings
Review scores
Source	Rating
AllMusic	4/5 stars
The Penguin Guide to Jazz Recordings	3.5/4 stars

In his review for AllMusic, Glenn Astarita states "The band sustains a flexible disposition via fragmented rhythmic exercises and Brown's homogeneous blend of soul-stirring choruses and verbose dialogues." The All About Jazz review by John Kelman notes that "The interplay, especially between Parker and Brown, is strong; this is free playing with a purpose, a sense of direction, and a sense of construction."

== Track listing ==
All compositions by Rob Brown except as indicated

1. "Lampost Ring" – 9:52
2. "Ripples – 9:34
3. "Unwind" – 10:20
4. "A Flower is a Lovesome Thing" (Billy Strayhorn) – 12:08
5. "Loaded Hand" –9:24
6. "A Whirl" – 2:48
7. "Unfurling" – 10:27

== Personnel ==
- Rob Brown – alto sax
- William Parker – bass
- Warren Smith – drums
