= Sweatshop (album) =

Studio album / Live album by Joe Morris
- Released: 1990
- Recorded: (1–5) September 15 & October 1, 1988 (6–9) October 10, 1989 & January 15, 1990
- Studio: (1–5) The Outpost, Stoughton, MA (6–9) Middle East, Cambridge, MA
- Genre: Jazz
- Length: 70:00
- Label: Riti
- Producer: Joe Morris

Joe Morris chronology
Human Rites (1987)	Sweatshop (1990)	Flip and Spike (1992)

Sweatshop is an album by American jazz guitarist Joe Morris released in 1990 on his own Riti label. It features a trio with Jerome Deupree, who was the original drummer in the rock band Morphine, and bassist Sebastian Steinberg. It was the first part of what Morris calls "Big Loud Electric Guitar" experiments, a mix of funk, rock, noise and collective improvisation.

== Reception ==
Professional ratings
Review scores
Source	Rating
AllMusic	4/5 stars

In his review for AllMusic, Thom Jurek states "In all, this is one of Morris' least-original (in terms of personal signature) works in a sense, but the ensemble playing is so deft, tight, and meaty, it is easily as enjoyable as his more groundbreaking later recordings."

== Track listing ==
All compositions by Joe Morris

1. "Four Pets" – 7:41
2. "The Oky Doke" – 5:00
3. "Fit Fit" – 6:24
4. "Teeming Millions" – 9:12
5. "World Iz Big" – 7:16
6. "What's What" – 7:40
7. "Well Put" – 8:22
8. "Are You Warm Now?" – 10:27
9. "Slow Learner" – 7:58

== Personnel ==
- Joe Morris – guitar
- Sebastian Steinberg – electric bass
- Jerome Deupree – drums
