= Lowell Davidson =

American jazz musician

Lowell Davidson (20 November 1941 – 31 July 1990) was a jazz pianist and biochemist from Boston, Massachusetts. He was known for his "sensible and free flowing approach to unconventional linear improvisation", but appeared on only a handful of commercially available recordings. Davidson also played bass, percussion, organ, electronic keyboards, and reed instruments.

== Background ==
Davidson was born in Roxbury, Massachusetts, and began studying piano at age four. When he was twelve, he became the organist at the Zion Temple Fire Baptized Holiness Church of God, where his parents were pastors. He attended the Boston Latin School, graduating in 1959, then enrolled at Harvard College on a full scholarship, studying biochemistry. During this time, he began a long period of experimentation with various kinds of drugs, which may have led to the psychological issues that would later manifest themselves. After six years at Harvard, Davidson was asked to leave, as his academic performance had suffered. He apparently landed on his feet, however; Milford Graves later recalled that by 1965, Davidson was "with a big laboratory up in Boston, with a big-time guy".

While at Harvard, Davidson became increasingly dedicated to music, and began traveling to New York City to play. During 1964, he met Ornette Coleman, and began playing with him on a regular basis. (Coleman would later refer to Davidson as his favorite pianist.) Davidson also occasionally played drums with the New York Art Quartet, substituting for Milford Graves when he was unavailable, and also played with Paul Motian, among others. (Prior to playing with Motian for the first time, Keith Jarrett heard him on a tape with Davidson; he later stated: "it completely knocked me out".)

At the recommendation of Coleman, Bernard Stollman, the founder of ESP-Disk, agreed to record Davidson without having heard him play. In July 1965, Davidson recorded his debut album, Lowell Davidson Trio (ESP 1012), featuring five original compositions, with bassist Gary Peacock and Graves on drums. Recorded in one take, it would prove to be Davidson's only commercial recording released during his lifetime.

Throughout the 1970s and 1980s, Davidson collaborated with many musicians in both Boston and New York. He experimented with graphic and proportional notation, and assembled a book consisting of shapes created by a color copier. (Guitarist Joe Morris recalled Davidson pointing to a small part of one of his graphic scores and telling him "if we practice for six months we might be able to play that".) Davidson also experimented with scores made from aluminum foil riddled with pin holes and held over a light in order to "burn the shape of the music into your synapses".

In the late 1980s, Davidson's behavior became increasingly erratic, and he was hospitalized at the psychiatric unit of Boston City Hospital. He later contracted tuberculosis, which went untreated, and died on 31 July 1990 at age 48. Ornette Coleman was among the attendees at his funeral, which was held at his family's church.

Joe Morris studied and performed with Davidson and has described the pianist as a major influence. In 1997, Morris released Antennae, an album inspired by some of Davidson's graphic scores, with bassist Nate McBride and drummer Jerome Deupree, on the AUM Fidelity label. In 2009, Morris released MVP LSD: The Graphic Scores of Lowell Skinner Davidson on Riti Records, featuring Morris on guitar, John Voigt on bass, and Tom Plsek on trombone. In 2012, Morris released Graffiti in Two Parts, a recording of a 1985 concert in Cambridge, Massachusetts, featuring Davidson on bass and drums, Morris on guitar, Malcolm Goldstein on violin, and Butch Morris on cornet, on the RogueArt label.

2014 saw the release of Rediscovered Session of 1988, on which Davidson appears with vibraphonist/pianist/drummer Richard Poole. Concerning his encounter with Davidson in the studio, Poole recalled: "Shortly after we began recording, I realized he was multidimensional... he talked constantly and shortly took over the session. He had an unusual aura; a cloud of white sparks traveled with him as he walked around the studio talking to himself... Lowell made Sun Ra look normal."

== Musical style and legacy ==
Pianist Ethan Iverson described Davidson as having "an approach somewhere between the fury of Cecil Taylor and the romance of Paul Bley". In a review of Lowell Davidson Trio, Jerry D'Souza wrote: "Davidson could make the piano speak in many different ways... he let his right hand find founts of inspiration and invention in beautifully flitting notes as well as deep emphasis. Davidson did not let space dominate the intervals. He let it in judiciously."

Raul D'Gama Rose wrote: "Lowell Davidson was one of those quintessential artists. A pianist possessed of great virtuosity, he was also a Harvard-educated biochemist and his musical art—both compositions and performance—and emerged from a confluence of the two. Davidson inhabited a rarified space. He understood and played with such harmonic sophistication that he may be compared in this respect only to Thelonious Monk, Herbie Nichols and Don Pullen. As a scientist-musician he believed that musical tones, if properly employed, could influence the evolution of the brain."

Joe Morris recalled: "His music was much more about sound. He used to talk about the upper partials clashing together. It was very slow moving, it was much more about sounds slowly morphing into other sounds... It was... like what you would call electroacoustic improvisation now. His trio music, even though it had bass and drums, moved at a very slow pace. It had a sort of groove, but it was very different. And he operated differently. His rhetoric was very different. I don't think he ever thought of himself as a jazz musician; he just saw himself as a musician. He was a very dignified, incredibly brilliant guy. He would never lower himself to some mere label." Morris added: "He was so brilliant in the way he spoke about things; it was impossible to dismiss it as just crazy talk. Even though at first it sounded like that, over time I understood what he was talking about, and we could have conversations. He used to say it was about evolution, that if we play things we haven't heard before, it will alter the biochemistry of the brain. He said that's what evolution is about... I understand that what he was really trying to do was to move humans forward." Regarding Davidson's funeral, Morris stated: "The music played by the church band circled and rose to the ceiling. The sounds clashed and blended. The partials merged. It sounded like Lowell's music."

Taylor McLean, a musician who had met Davidson at Harvard, stated that despite Davidson's personal issues, his life was "positive and victorious." He recalled that Davidson lived in an "alternative universe" in which he was successful: "It is a form of success that is little understood, and that brings with it no comforts. The artist is driven to pursue and formulate successive objective forms. That is the only way to cross the river and stay alive in the current. It is a form of achievement and 'success' that is incomprehensible to the normative path because it comes at great personal cost, [does not] include social status, accumulation of material goods, praise and adulation, or even a supportive social network. Lowell was a champion in this area."

== Discography ==
=== As leader ===
- Lowell Davidson Trio (ESP-Disk, 1969)
- Rediscovered Session Of 1988 (Music Artist Company, 2014)

=== As sideman ===
With Joe Morris

- Graffiti in Two Parts (RogueArt, 2012)
