= Beautiful Existence =

Studio album by Joe Morris
- Released: 2005
- Recorded: October 15, 2004
- Studio: PKRS, New York City
- Genre: Jazz
- Length: 51:43
- Label: Clean Feed
- Producer: Joe Morris

Joe Morris chronology
Likewise (2003)	Beautiful Existence (2005)	Rebus (2007)

Beautiful Existence is an album by American jazz guitarist Joe Morris, which was recorded in 2004 and released on the Portuguese Clean Feed label. He leads a new quartet consisting of the trio with whom he recorded Age of Everything with the addition of alto saxophonist Jim Hobbs.

== Reception ==
Professional ratings
Review scores
Source	Rating
AllMusic	4/5 stars
The Penguin Guide to Jazz	3.5/4 stars

In his review for AllMusic, Steve Loewy states " Morris is a superb composer, too, as he dishes up generally simple though piercing melodies, some of which, such as the slower, yet bubbly Ornette Coleman-influenced 'Some Good' are infused with an attractive bluesy tinge."

The Penguin Guide to Jazz states "This is a powerful statement, with a kind of chastened beauty, from a label that seems determined to catch anything new and exciting in contemporary music on the fly."

The All About Jazz review by Troy Collins says "With hauntingly atmospheric modal grooves, tender, reflective ballads and invigorating, angular free bop, Morris's singular talents as a guitarist have never been more evident."

== Track listing ==
All compositions by Joe Morris

1. "Smear Spring" – 6:30
2. "Some Good" – 9:27
3. "Knew Something" – 9:27
4. "Real Reason" – 4:54
5. "King Cobra" – 9:23
6. "Beautiful Existence" – 12:02

== Personnel ==
- Joe Morris - guitar
- Jim Hobbs – alto sax
- Timo Shanko – bass
- Luther Gray – drums
