= Likewise (Stone House album) =

Studio album by Stone House
- Released: 2003
- Recorded: February 15 & 16, 2003
- Studio: Riti Studios, Guilford, Connecticut
- Genre: Jazz
- Length: 69:20
- Label: Riti
- Producer: Joe Morris

Rob Brown chronology
Round the Bend (2002)	Likewise (2003)	The Big Picture (2004)

Joe Morris chronology
Age of Everything (2002)	Likewise (2003)	Beautiful Existence (2005)

Likewise is an album by Stone House, a collective trio consisting of Luther Gray on drums, Joe Morris on bass and Rob Brown on alto saxophone and flute. It was recorded in 2003 and released on Morris' Riti label. They played seven totally improvised pieces of music. Morris and Brown worked together since 1992. Gray, the youngest member of the group, played previously on Morris' album Age of Everything.

== Reception ==
In his review for JazzTimes, Aaron Steinberg states "Far from a vanity project, this is deft, sophisticated free improvisation, and one of an increasing number of notable releases on Riti. Brown, who quietly turns out more and more impressive contributions with every new recording it seems, leads the way with deliberate, soulful statements delivered with utter conviction."

== Track listing ==
All tracks totally improvised by Morris/Gray/Brown

1. "Meet Me in Another Reality" – 7:46
2. "Likewise" – 12:07
3. "Emotion of Space" – 11:09
4. "Turning" – 6:33
5. "Lifelike" – 10:03
6. "Ground Truth" – 8:15
7. "Open Oblique" – 13:27

== Personnel ==
- Luther Gray - drums
- Joe Morris – bass
- Rob Brown – alto sax, flute
