= MVP LSD =

MVP LSD: The Graphic Scores of Lowell Skinner Davidson
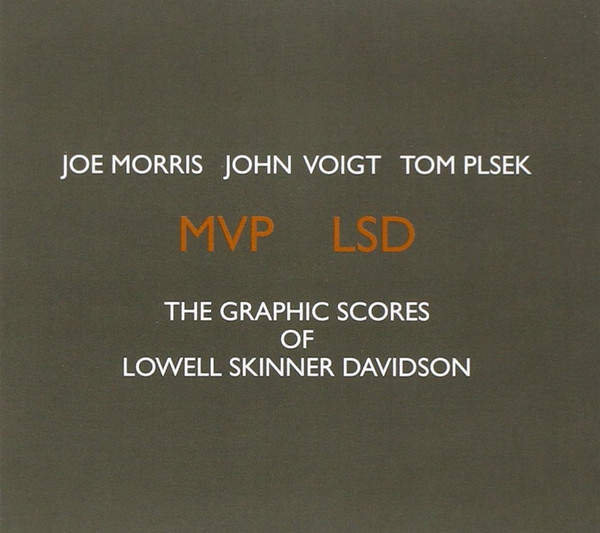

Studio album by Joe Morris, John Voigt, and Tom Plsek
- Released: 2008
- Genre: Free improvisation
- Label: Riti Records; CD10

Joe Morris chronology
Elm City Duets (2008)	MVP LSD: The Graphic Scores of Lowell Skinner Davidson (2008)	Wildlife (2009)

MVP LSD: The Graphic Scores of Lowell Skinner Davidson is an album by guitarist Joe Morris, double bassist John Voigt, and trombonist Tom Plsek. Featuring interpretations of graphic scores by composer and multi-instrumentalist Lowell Davidson, it was released in 2008 by Morris's Riti Records label.

In the album liner notes, Morris described the scores: "They all feature notes (dots) on a stave (lines), but the staves are arbitrary and the notes are placed in the arbitrary staves rendering them arbitrary too. Proportion is a big factor in the scores. Some notes are big and some are tiny... There are a lot of colors including gold and silver, and many of the dots (blobs) are of an amorphous shape... They offer the player a specific guide toward randomness and imagination."

Regarding the album title, "MVP" refers to the musicians' last names, while "LSD" is "Lowell Skinner Davidson." According to Morris, the track titles were "invented by MVP. LSD didn't title these pieces."

== Reception ==
Professional ratings
Review scores
Source	Rating
AllMusic	4/5 stars

In a review for AllMusic, Phil Freeman wrote: "The absence of a rhythm instrument gives this music a chamber-ish feel, so it could potentially appeal just as much to fans of Elliott Carter as to longtime Morris (or Jimmy Giuffre) listeners. Never mind the historical significance of Davidson and these scores... MVP LSD comes highly, highly recommended on grounds of pure beauty."

Point of Departure's Stuart Broomer stated: "The results are almost continuously beautiful, the three musicians finding notes for forms that can never be directly transcribed, combining memory and tribute with the on-going process of finding sonic substance for marks on paper that are not the usual code to be deciphered but runic markings to a synaesthetic experience in which visual and sonic elements fuse."

Marc Medwin of Dusted Magazine commented: "As with most engaging music, so much informs every moment of MVP LSD that any overarching description is futile. Each performer has a large timbral pallet, but more conventional modes of expression are also plentiful... There is dialogue a-plenty, but the larger picture is of a trio, the three musicians often seeming to breathe as one as they explore these rich and multivalent compositional landscapes."

Writing for The Squid's Ear, Wyman Brantley remarked: "the music here is self-assured yet highly idiosyncratic. It is almost as if one has stumbled upon some forgotten civilization and heard their strangely beautiful folk music for the first time; or looked at another way, it is as if LSD, through MVP, has actually managed to create a music all his own."

== Track listing ==
"Particles" composed by Joe Morris, John Voigt, and Tom Plsek. Remaining tracks composed by Lowell Skinner Davidson.

1. "Blue Sky and Blotches" – 11:06
2. "Particles" – 4:32
3. "Separate Blue X's" – 2:38
4. "Gold Drop #2" – 3:54
5. "Orange Cards" – 4:41
6. "Index Card #3" – 3:47
7. "Index Card #1" – 3:38
8. "Index Card #2" – 2:15
9. "Double Sheet" – 16:04
10. "Gold Triptych" – 6:24
11. "Gold Drop #1" – 4:23

== Personnel ==
- Joe Morris – guitar
- John Voigt – double bass
- Tom Plsek – trombone
