= Lowell Davidson Trio =

Studio album by Lowell Davidson
- Released: August 9, 1969
- Recorded: July 27, 1965
- Genre: Jazz
- Length: 44:31
- Label: ESP-Disk

Lowell Davidson Trio is the debut album by American jazz pianist Lowell Davidson, and the only commercially available recording issued during his lifetime. It was recorded in 1965, and was released on the ESP-Disk label. The album, which contains five original compositions, features Davidson on piano, along with Gary Peacock on bass and Milford Graves on drums.

== Background ==
Bernard Stollman, the founder of ESP-Disk, agreed to record Davidson without having heard him play following a recommendation from Ornette Coleman. Davidson had been playing with Coleman on a regular basis, and Coleman later referred to him as his favorite pianist. The album was recorded in one take, with minimal rehearsal.

== Reception ==
Professional ratings
Review scores
Source	Rating
AllMusic	4/5 stars

In an AllMusic review, Michael G. Nastos awarded the album four stars, calling it a "distinguished document", "a treasure", and "a fascinating display of understated, purely improvised music that is eminently listenable, beautifully conceived, and flowing through past, present (circa 1965) and future resources." He called the rhythm section of Peacock and Graves "stellar, and in this case sublime". Writing for All About Jazz, Lyn Horton wrote that "the interaction among musicians is cultivated and beautifully expressed... The language which the trio speaks has the same syntax. The phrasing is isolated and abstract. Just as the piano can move along in a series of quasi-fluid phrases, the drums and bass counteract that motion with just as many interpretations of the dynamic. All three instruments behave with a peculiar but common lyricism, which penetrates the entire recording." She concluded: "Davidson's mix of reason and heart will remain as his legacy, surely for many years to come."

In another review for All About Jazz, Jerry D'Souza wrote that the album "serves well to define the extraordinary talent that was Lowell Davidson", and commented that Peacock and Graves "work well in the free flowing and changing dimensions he sets up, ready for his every whim, alert to his agile shifts". Reviewer Raul D'Gama Rose commented: "The music on this record, in particular Davidson's compositions and his pianoforte is complete in every sense... Almost mimicking the human voice that is singing in short thrilling phrases, Davidson's songs are like vocal necklaces comprising gorgeous gem-like beads of notes in elaborately decorative chains of provocative combinations. Strung together almost endlessly in hitherto unheard of designs, the music strikes the consciousness as the soft felt of the hammers of the piano are tapping in the nerves of the brain just as they do the myriad and perfectly tuned strings inside the body of the piano".

The authors of The Penguin Guide to Jazz wrote that despite the fact that the recording is "a technical disgrace, shoddily balanced and with almost no bass presence", "the music is fascinating, immediately different from what's considered to be the dominant Cecil Taylor school. One might say Mal Waldron is closer in overall sound and spirit. Davidson nudges at small areas of sound, moving them around his keyboard until he has built up edifices of surprising complexity". Writer Mark Harvey called Davidson's album "truly unique", "a poetic distillation of much that was swirling around him yet presented in his own inimitable manner".

== Track listing ==
All compositions by Lowell Davidson

1. "L" - 8:11
2. "Stately I" - 11:04
3. "Dunce" - 4:29
4. "Ad Hoc" - 12:16
5. "Strong Tears" - 8:31

- Recorded on July 27, 1965

== Personnel ==
- Lowell Davidson - piano
- Gary Peacock - bass
- Milford Graves - drums
