= Visage (Rob Brown album) =

Studio album by Rob Brown
- Released: 2000
- Recorded: October 18, 1998
- Studio: Faubourg Saint Antoine cellar, Paris
- Genre: Jazz
- Length: 69:32
- Label: Marge
- Producer: Gérard Terronès

Rob Brown chronology
Scratching the Surface (1998)	Visage (2000)	Jumping Off the Page (2000)

Visage is an album by American jazz saxophonist Rob Brown recorded in 1998 and released on the French Marge label. It features a never previously heard Rob Brown trio with bassist Wilber Morris and drummer Lou Grassi. These three musicians were programmed with different bands during the 1998 edition of the French Rive de Gier jazz festival and producer Gérard Terronès took the opportunity to record the trio in Paris.

== Reception ==
Professional ratings
Review scores
Source	Rating
AllMusic	4/5 stars

In his review for AllMusic, Thom Jurek states "The entire album is a meditation on the instinct of blues and mood, and as such it presents Brown in an entirely different light as a soloist and as a leader."

== Track listing ==
All compositions by Rob Brown, Wilber Morris, Lou Grassi

1. "A Step Out the Door" – 8:35
2. "Vigil" – 8:30
3. "Pivot-full Swing" – 6:52
4. "Pussy Foot" – 9:50
5. "Bated Breath" – 9:53
6. "Skipper" – 15:34
7. "Tatters" – 10:18

== Personnel ==
- Rob Brown – alto sax, flute
- Wilber Morris – bass
- Lou Grassi – drums, percussion
