= Alphaville Suite =

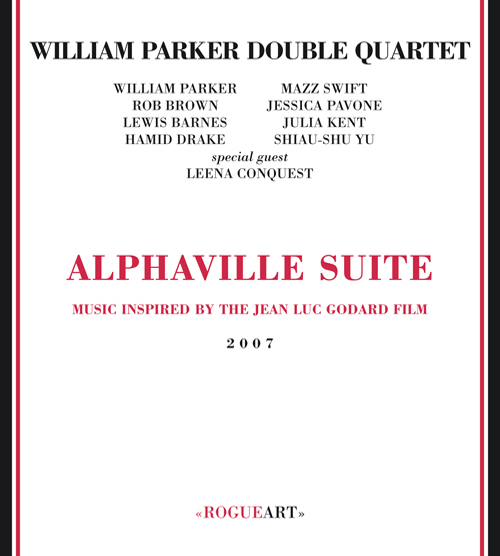

Studio album by William Parker Double Quartet
- Released: 2007
- Recorded: January 4 & 5, 2007
- Studio: Leon Lee Dorsey Studio, New York City
- Genre: Jazz
- Length: 72:09
- Label: RogueArt; ROG 017
- Producer: William Parker

William Parker chronology
| Corn Meal Dance (2007) | Alphaville Suite (2007) | Double Sunrise Over Neptune (2007) |

Alphaville Suite (subtitled Music Inspired by the Jean Luc Godard Film) is an album by bassist and composer William Parker's Double Quartet inspired by the film Alphaville (1965), which was recorded in 2007 and released on the RogueArt label.

== Reception ==
All About Jazz stated "For this project, he paired his quartet with a modified string quartet (violin, viola and two cellos) for a strong set of compositions. The "double quartet" is thoroughly integrated—this isn't a simple lush-string-backup horn session. As with writing for a singer or arranging well-known pop songs, Parker proves again that he's skilled at gathering the components needed for a project and then making excellent use of them".

Pitchfork's review observed "There are moments of sharp dissonance and unconventional technique-- strings played on the frog or with the back of the bow, saxes overblown and honked, but these are balanced by passages of strong forward momentum and clarity".

== Track listing ==
All compositions by William Parker except as indicated

1. "Alphaville Main Theme" – 6:02
2. "Journey to the End of the Night" – 11:00
3. "Natasha's Theme I" – 2:05
4. "Interrogation" – 2:50
5. "Alpha 60" – 9:45
6. "Doctor Badguy" – 14:08
7. "Oceanville Evening" – 3:05
8. "Civilization of Light" – 16:49
9. "Outlands" – 6:57
10. "Natasha's Theme II" – 2:08

== Personnel ==
- William Parker – bass
- Leena Conquest – vocals (tracks 3 & 10)
- Lewis Barnes – trumpet
- Rob Brown – alto saxophone
- Mazz Swift – violin
- Jessica Pavone – viola
- Julia Kent, Shiau-Shu Yu – cello
- Hamid Drake – drums
