= Altitude (Joe Morris album) =

Live album by Joe Morris
- Released: 2012
- Recorded: June 17, 2011
- Venue: The Stone, New York City
- Genre: Jazz
- Length: 72:27
- Label: AUM Fidelity
- Producer: Joe Morris, Steven Joerg

Joe Morris chronology
Graffiti in Two Parts (2012)	Altitude (2012)	From the Discrete to the Particular (2012)

Altitude is an album by American jazz guitarist Joe Morris which was recorded live in 2011 and released on the AUM Fidelity label. It documents the first time performance by Morris, bassist William Parker and drummer Gerald Cleaver as a trio during a two-week of dates curated at John Zorn's club The Stone by label owner Steven Joerg. For the second set, excerpted in the final two cuts of the album, Parker played sintir, the Moroccan bass lute, instead of upright bass. All the tracks are collective and completely improvised.

== Reception ==
Professional ratings
Review scores
Source	Rating
Down Beat	4/5 stars

The All About Jazz by Mark Corroto says "Piece-by-piece the trio builds their three way dialogue, forgoing the classic model of building tension followed by release. They maintain a constant exchange throughout." Another review for All About Jazz by John Sharpe remarks "Inspired by the lengthy expositions of Coltrane and Cecil Taylor (although sounding nothing like either) the threesome maintains an urgent pace throughout the first extended piece."

In a review for Down Beat Brad Faberman states "Playing steady time can be confining, but the opposite extreme—abandoning rhythm altogether—is just as much a jail... The free-improvising trio has chosen to operate somewhere in between, bending beats until they’re vague and uncountable but still deeply felt."

The JazzTimes review by Shaun Brady says "The two collectively improvised sets are all about forward motion, all three players enjoying a constant propulsion." In a review for PopMatters John Garratt notes that "Altitude doesn’t feel intricately experimental. It sounds like three guys picking up the free jazz thread and pulling at it for one night, simply for the joy of it."

The Exclaim! review by Glen Hall states "The first two tracks clock in at over 25 minutes apiece. They are jam-packed with fervour and potent playing, especially from drummer Gerald Cleaver, who is utterly relentless in his invention of responses to his cohorts and his assertions... Altitude is intellectual energy music."

== Track listing ==
All compositions by Morris / Parker / Cleaver

1. "Exosphere" – 26:22
2. "Thermosphere" – 25:22
3. "Troposphere" – 12:04
4. "Mesosphere" – 8:39

== Personnel ==
- Joe Morris - guitar
- William Parker – bass, sintir
- Gerald Cleaver – drums
