= Crown Trunk Root Funk =

Studio album by Rob Brown
- Released: 2008
- Recorded: February 15, 2007
- Venue: MPI Studio, New York City
- Genre: Jazz
- Length: 59:09
- Label: AUM Fidelity
- Producer: Rob Brown, Steven Joerg

Rob Brown chronology
| Live in Chicago (2007) | Crown Trunk Root Funk (2008) | Live at Firehouse 12 (2009) |

Crown Trunk Root Funk is an album by American jazz saxophonist Rob Brown recorded in 2007 and released on the AUM Fidelity label. He leads the Rob Brown Ensemble, which includes pianist Craig Taborn, bassist William Parker and drummer Gerald Cleaver. The group was initially formed for a performance at the 2006 Vision Festival.

== Reception ==
The All About Jazz review by Troy Collins states "A formidable blend of funky abstraction, angular post-bop and dark impressionism, it offers an expansive view of Brown's adventurous aesthetic."

In a review for PopMatters Gabriel Baker says "Generally well-balanced, eminently exploratory, and surprisingly funky, Crown Trunk Root Funk is a successful product from a musician just as adept in the studio as he is on a New York club stage or at any other venue."

== Track listing ==
All compositions by Rob Brown

1. "Rocking Horse" – 10:55
2. "Clearly Speaking" – 6:54
3. "Sonic Ecosystem" – 11:15
4. "Ghost Dog" – 7:31
5. "Exuberance" – 6:16
6. "Lifeboat" – 6:27
7. "Worlds Spinning" – 9:51

== Personnel ==
- Rob Brown – alto sax
- Craig Taborn - piano, electronics
- William Parker - bass
- Gerald Cleaver – drums
