= A Cloud of Black Birds =

Studio album by Joe Morris
- Released: 1998
- Recorded: June 26, 1998
- Studios: PBS Studios, Westwood, MA
- Genre: Jazz
- Length: 57:15
- Label: AUM Fidelity
- Producers: Joe Morris, Steven Joerg

Joe Morris chronology
Like Rays (1998)	A Cloud of Black Birds (1998)	Deep Telling (1999)

A Cloud of Black Birds is an album by the American jazz guitarist Joe Morris, recorded in 1998 and released on the AUM Fidelity label. It features a quartet with bassist Chris Lightcap, violinist Mat Maneri and drummer Jerome Deupree.

== Reception ==
Professional ratings
Review scores
Source	Rating
AllMusic	3/5 stars
The Penguin Guide to Jazz	3.5/4 stars

In his review for AllMusic, David R. Adler states: "The music is intense and challenging, but it has a certain airiness." The Penguin Guide to Jazz thought that the "reunion with Maneri sparks off a lot of shared experience, and their interaction, notably on the duo 'Renascent', is close, intelligent and thoroughly sympathetic."

The JazzTimes review by Harvey Pekar noted: "Morris' solos have an angular quality. He plays both flurries of notes and spare phrases during which he's thinking from interval to interval, trying to make the shape of his lines as distinctive as possible."

== Track listing ==
All compositions by Joe Morris except as indicated

1. "Threshold" – 10:54
2. "Mesmeric" (Morris, Lightcap, Maneri, Deupree) – 8:06
3. "A Cloud of Black Birds" – 8:48
4. "Emblem" – 8:54
5. "Renascent" (Morris, Maneri) – 4:07
6. "Radiant Flux" – 9:52
7. "Take Place" (Morris, Lightcap, Maneri, Deupree) – 6:34

== Personnel ==
- Joe Morris - guitar
- Chris Lightcap – bass
- Mat Maneri – violin
- Jerome Deupree – drums
