= Big Top (album) =

Studio album by Whit Dickey
- Released: 2000
- Recorded: November 20, 1999
- Studio: Hillside Sound, Englewood, New Jersey
- Genre: Jazz
- Length: 52:33
- Label: Wobbly Rail
- Producer: Whit Dickey, Mac McCaughan

Whit Dickey chronology
Transonic (1998)	Big Top (2000)	Life Cycle (2001)

Big Top is the second album by American jazz drummer Whit Dickey, which was recorded in 1999 and released on Wobbly Rail, a short-lived imprint started by Merge Records/Superchunk principal Mac McCaughan. For this record, Dickey expanded to a quartet consisting of the trio with whom he recorded Transonic, with the addition of guitarist Joe Morris. They played Eric Dolphy composition "The Prophet", from the album At the Five Spot, and Thelonious Monk's "Skippy".

== Reception ==
Professional ratings
Review scores
Source	Rating
The Penguin Guide to Jazz	3/4 stars

The Penguin Guide to Jazz notes that "the leader can sound hyperactive and unreflective, but there is no mistaking the power of his playing." The JazzTimes review by Peter Margasak states "With Brown's alto saxophone imbued with melancholia, his upper register peregrinations full of piercing sobs, and Morris peeling off skeins of tunefully cascading notes, the rhythm section caresses and prods things along with constant shape-shifting; in particular, Dickey's gentle cymbal play is a marvel of coloristic and rhythmic variety."

== Track listing ==
All compositions by Whit Dickey except as indicated

1. "Big Top" – 7:58
2. "The Prophet" (Eric Dolphy) – 11:22
3. "Skippy" (Thelonious Monk) – 9:53
4. "The Inmortals" – 23:20

== Personnel ==
- Whit Dickey – drums
- Joe Morris - guitar
- Chris Lightcap – bass
- Rob Brown – alto sax, tenor sax, flute
