= Andrea Parkins =

American composer and musician

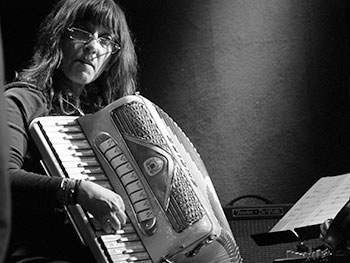

Background information
- Origin: New York City, United States
- Occupation(s): Composer, sound artist, performer, musician
- Instrument: Electric accordion
- Website: andreaparkins.com

Andrea Parkins is an American composer, sound artist, performer and improvisational musician based in New York. She is known for her inventive explorations on the electric accordion, generative sound processing, and arrangements of objects and sound. Parkins received a BFA from Tufts University and MFA from Mason Gross School of the Arts, Rutgers University.

Parkins's work is influenced by the compositional strategies of John Cage and Fluxus and pays homage to musique concrète and 1970s analog synth. Parkins often incorporates electronically processed accordion, customized sound processing, live tape manipulation, analog effects boxes, laptop electronics, acoustic piano, sampling, and amplified objects. Her method and sound were characterized by LA Weekly as: “The big, varied, confidently conceived abstractions Parkins yanks from her squeezebox, laptop, effects devices and maybe piano — cloudy and cranky one minute, surgically sharp the next.” With an unconventional approach to instruments, Parkins “fragments the instrument's traditional vocabulary and expands its capabilities with electronics and extended techniques.”

Recently Andrea Parkins has been developing a series of interactive sound and image works inspired by the structures of Rube Goldberg's circuitous machines. Describing this organizational approach Stephen Bezan remarked: “the individual sounds manipulated by Parkins seem to interact and influence the outcome of the other, crafting a goal-oriented structure based on timbre, not harmony or rhythm. This approach transcends the inherent cacophony of the material and reveals a genuinely organic, even playful quality to her work.” Parkins has described her Rube Goldberg approach as a means for examining slippages between object and meaning. She observed: “An important conceptual thread running through these pieces is the discovery and expression of metaphors for the slippage and tension between object and meaning that occurs through the passage of time.” Describing her intentions, Parkins noted: “As both a sonic and visual artist, I try to build and layer idiosyncratic systems and structures that point to these shifts in meaning.”

Andrea Parkins has toured and exhibited internationally and has been presented at the Whitney Museum of American Art, The Kitchen, Experimental Intermedia, and Diapason Gallery for Sound and Intermedia. She has collaborated with musicians such as Nels Cline, Jim Black, Ellery Eskelin, David Watson, David Fenech, Fred Frith, Thomas Lehn, Günter Müller, and Otomo Yoshihide and choreographers Olive Bieringa and Otto Ramstad from the BodyCartography Project. Parkins has been the recipient of various grants, awards, and residencies including Meet the Composer, New York State Council for the Arts, Harvestworks Media Art Center, in New York City, Frei und Hanseastadt Hamburg Kulturbehoerde, in Germany, and CESTA in the Czech Republic.

== Partial discography ==
- One Great Day... (1996)
- Cast Iron Fact (1996)
- Slippage (1999)
- Downpour (2007)
- Cities and Eyes: The Skein (2008)
- Faulty (Broken Orbit) (2009)

With Joe Morris

- Many Rings (Knitting Factory, 1999)

With Nels Cline

- New Monastery (Cryptogramophone, 2006)
