= Many Rings =

Studio album by Joe Morris
- Released: 1999
- Recorded: February 5, 1999
- Studio: Knitting Factory Recording Studios, New York City
- Genre: Jazz
- Length: 62:37
- Label: Knitting Factory
- Producer: Joe Morris

Joe Morris chronology
Deep Telling (1999)	Many Rings (1999)	Underthru (1999)

Many Rings is an album by the American jazz guitarist Joe Morris, recorded in 1999 and released on the Knitting Factory label. He leads an experimental quartet featuring bassoonist Karen Borca, saxophonist Rob Brown and accordionist Andrea Parkins.

== Reception ==
Professional ratings
Review scores
Source	Rating
AllMusic	3/5 stars
The Penguin Guide to Jazz	3/4 stars

In his review for AllMusic, Alex Henderson states: "This is hardly a session in which the quartet states the theme and the players take turns blowing--when Morris is soloing, you never know who will jump in and respond with some blowing of his or her own."

The Penguin Guide to Jazz observes that "the title piece is the most convincing representation of its unconventional sonority, and some care has been taken to register all the elements with something like democracy."

In his review for JazzTimes, Larry Appelbaum states: "Everything is rooted in the improviser's collective ability to listen and create spontaneous harmony, pulse and structure."

== Track listing ==
All compositions by Joe Morris

1. "Drawn to the Magnet" – 5:52
2. "Many Rings" – 14:25
3. "First Appearance" – 4:25
4. "Chapel Level" – 10:35
5. "Motion to the Air" – 3:28
6. "Situation to Be In" – 5:15
7. "Small Cycle" – 11:06
8. "Blue Spots Here" – 7:31

== Personnel ==
- Joe Morris - guitar
- Karen Borca – bassoon
- Rob Brown – alto sax, flute
- Andrea Parkins – accordion, sampler
