= Racket Club (album) =

Studio album by Joe Morris
- Released: 1998
- Recorded: June 26, 1993
- Studio: The Outpost, Stoughton, MA
- Genre: Jazz
- Length: 64:14
- Label: About Time
- Producer: Joe Morris

Joe Morris chronology
Antennae (1997)	Racket Club (1998)	Like Rays (1998)

Racket Club is an album by American jazz guitarist Joe Morris, which was recorded in 1993 and released on the About Time label. It was the second part of what Morris calls "Big Loud Electric Guitar" experiments, that started with Sweatshop.

== Reception ==
Professional ratings
Review scores
Source	Rating
AllMusic	3/5 stars

In his review for AllMusic, Thom Jurek notes that "this is an inverse portrait of Ornette Coleman's Prime Time band, a group that, at least here, deeply influenced Morris, not only in terms of composition and improvisation, but his tonal technical approach to the guitar."

In a review for JazzTimes Larry Appelbaum states "It's a white-knuckle, noisy, wild trip of a CD, great for head banging."

== Track listing ==
All compositions by Joe Morris

1. "Rumble Strip" – 8:28
2. "Revolve" – 9:45
3. "Wedge" – 6:40
4. "Cellular" – 6:22
5. "Vapor" – 11:28
6. "Pointyhead (Parts 1 & 2)" – 4:49
7. "Instinct" – 8:00
8. "Slipshod" – 8:42

== Personnel ==
- Joe Morris - guitar
- Jim Hobbs – alto sax
- Steve Norton – baritone sax
- Nate McBride – electric bass
- Jerome Deupree – drums
- Curt Newton – drums
