= Traits (album) =

Studio album by Joe Morris
- Released: 2011
- Recorded: October 24, 2010
- Studio: Riti Studios, Guilford, Connecticut
- Genre: Jazz
- Length: 66:03
- Label: Riti
- Producer: Joe Morris

Joe Morris chronology
Sensor (2010)	Traits (2011)	Ambrosia (2011)

Traits is an album by American jazz musician Joe Morris, which was recorded in 2010 and released on his own Riti label. It was the second recording by his group Wildlife, expanded to a quartet consisting of the trio with whom he recorded the eponymous debut album, with the addition of alto saxophonist Jim Hobbs.

== Reception ==
Professional ratings
Review scores
Source	Rating
AllMusic	4.5/5 stars
Down Beat	3.5/5 stars

In his review for AllMusic, Phil Freeman states "The melodies have an Ayler-esque flavor, particularly when Jim Hobbs is crying and murmuring to himself; Cancura is an even more forceful, blustery player, not ceding an inch to his new partner."

In a review for Down Beat Bill Meyer notes that "the addition of Jim Hobbs has pushed the combo to play with greater intensity, particularly when both horn players simultaneously essay independent, expressionist lines."

== Track listing ==
All compositions by Morris / Gray / Cancura / Hobbs

1. "Howlin'" – 9:24
2. "Tracking" – 13:02
3. "Coloration" – 6:53
4. "Game" – 12:33
5. "Display" – 10:10
6. "Territorial" – 14:00

== Personnel ==
- Joe Morris - bass
- Luther Gray – drums
- Petr Cancura – tenor sax
- Jim Hobbs – alto sax
