= Illuminate (Joe Morris and Rob Brown album) =

Studio album by Joe Morris and Rob Brown
- Released: 1995
- Recorded: November 9, 1993
- Studio: Tedesco Studio, Paramus, NJ
- Genre: Jazz
- Length: 53:24
- Label: Leo
- Producer: Joe Morris, Rob Brown, Leo Feigin

Joe Morris chronology
Symbolic Gesture (1994)	Illuminate (1995)	No Vertigo (1995)

Rob Brown chronology
Youniverse (1992)	Illuminate (1995)	High Wire (1996)

Illuminate is an album by a quartet co-led by jazz guitarist Joe Morris and alto saxophonist Rob Brown, which was recorded in 1993 and released on Leo Lab, a sublabel of Leo Records. Rehearsing and recording this album was the first time the quartet worked together as a band, although Morris played with Brown before on Youniverse and the trio without Morris recorded High Wire.

== Reception ==
Professional ratings
Review scores
Source	Rating
AllMusic	3/5 stars
The Penguin Guide to Jazz	3/4 stars

In his review for AllMusic, Thom Jurek says about the album that "it's a challenging and deeply satisfying set of music by a short-lived but gifted quartet." The Penguin Guide to Jazz states "the defining characteristic of the music on Illuminate is the responsiveness of the player to one another."

== Track listing ==
1. "Results" (Morris, Brown, Parker, Krall) – 11:52
2. "Illuminate" (Joe Morris) – 7:11
3. "Inklings" (Rob Brown) – 23:01
4. "Pivotal" (Morris, Brown, Parker, Krall) – 11:13

== Personnel ==
- Joe Morris - guitar
- Rob Brown – alto sax
- William Parker – bass
- Jackson Krall – drums
