= All Night Burner =

Studio album by The Crown Royals
- Released: 1996–1997
- Recorded: February 8 & 9, 1997; November 11, 1995 (tracks 9–10)
- Studio: Airwave, Chicago; The Playground, Chicago (tracks 9–10)
- Genre: R&B, Funk
- Length: 41:26
- Label: Estrus

Ken Vandermark chronology
Fred Anderson / DKV Trio (1997)	All Night Burner (1996)	Baraka (1997)

All Night Burner is the debut album by The Crown Royals, an instrumental R&B/funk quartet which includes jazz saxophonist Ken Vandermark. It was released in 1997 on Estrus.

== Reception ==
The Chicago Tribune review by Mo Ryan states "This instrumental Chicago quartet plays a funky, low-down, utterly addictive combination of rock, blues and jazz, one that seduces the listener with captivating grooves and rock-solid rhythms."

In an article for the Chicago Reader, John Corbett notes that "While their earlier tunes tended to emphasize a sound very reminiscent of the New Orleans funk essentialists The Meters, their latest batch of original numbers (only one cover, an odd, obscure James Brown hummer called 'In the Middle') is less singular in its references."

== Track listing ==
All compositions by The Crown Royals except as indicated

1. "Shake It" – 3:43
2. "All Night Burner" – 3:49
3. "Look, New Shoes" – 6:34
4. "Six Pack" – 2:55
5. "South Sea" – 4:16
6. "Dogget's Bone" – 3:00
7. "Boss Nova" – 3:37
8. "In The Middle" (B. Hobgood, A. Ellis) – 5:41
9. "Boomerang" – 3:21
10. "Hangin' Thang" – 4:30

== Personnel ==
- Jeff BBQ – drums
- Mark Blade – bass
- Pete Nathan – guitar
- Ken Vandermark – tenor saxophone
