= Graffiti in Two Parts =

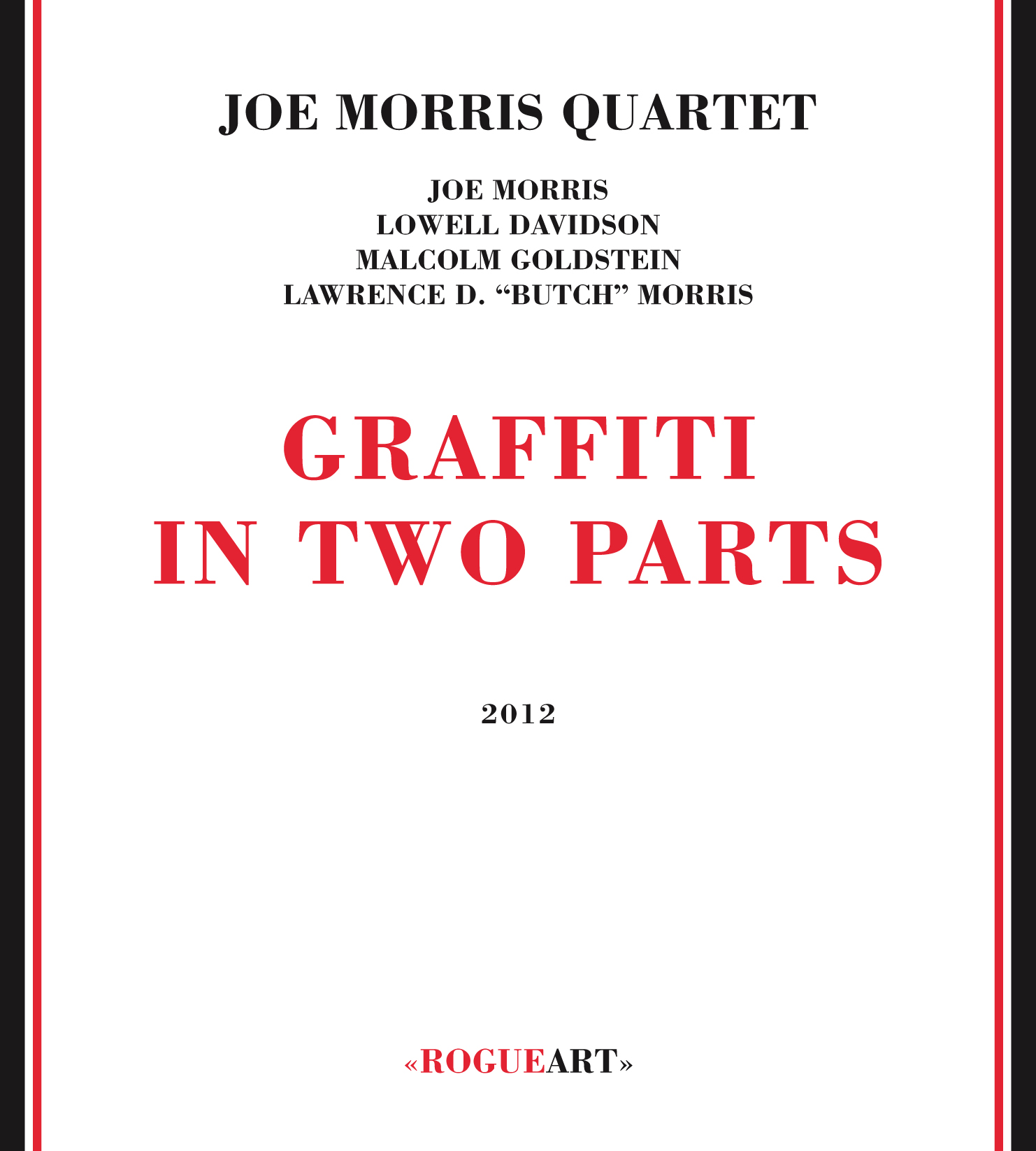

Live album by Joe Morris Quartet
- Released: 2012
- Recorded: May 11, 1985
- Venue: The Cambridge Dance Center, Cambridge, Massachusetts
- Genre: Free improvisation
- Length: 1:09:54
- Label: Rogueart; ROG-0039
- Producer: Michel Dorbon

Joe Morris chronology
XYX (2011)	Graffiti in Two Parts (2012)	Altitude (2012)

Graffiti in Two Parts is a live album by the Joe Morris Quartet, led by Morris on guitar and banjouke, and featuring cornetist Lawrence D. "Butch" Morris, violinist Malcolm Goldstein, and, in a rare appearance, multi-instrumentalist Lowell Davidson on drums and aluminum acoustic bass. It was recorded on May 11, 1985, at the Cambridge Dance Center in Cambridge, Massachusetts, and was released in 2012 by the Rogueart label.

In the album liner notes, Joe Morris reflected: "street graffiti was everywhere back then and much was written about the quality, form and the act of 'tagging'. To me, graffiti contained a similar spirit of subversive messaging to that of the music I was making... The symbolism of the other or indefinable... reflected what I sought as a combination of modern and ancient codes... Being aware of this I decided to organize a concert with the title 'Graffiti in Two Parts' meant to display these qualities in sound."

== Reception ==
Professional ratings
Review scores
Source	Rating
All About Jazz	2.5/5 stars
DownBeat	2.5/5 stars
The Free Jazz Collective	4.5/5 stars

John Sharpe of All About Jazz wrote: "Remarkable for its individuals' selflessness, the program is a low-key, undemonstrative affair... Passages of drifting lyrical abstraction, punctuated by off-kilter percussive noises, provide depth to proceedings, but otherwise it's an enigmatic encounter in which Davidson remains elusive."

DownBeat's Alain Drouot stated that, although "there is empathy between the musicians who carefully react as the improvisation process unfolds," "the performance suffers from a lack of dynamics as well as scarcity in terms of change of pace."

In a review for The Free Jazz Collective, Stef Gijssels called the recording "magical," and commented: "the music on this album is hard to grasp and hard to describe, but more than worth looking for... all four musicians move as one, creating a unique sound, one that sounds familiar like everyday objects while at the same time revealing some deeper unfathomable things."

Writing for JazzWord, Ken Waxman remarked: "the textures... are sympathetically aligned, but the presentation is nearly opaque. Combining the trumpeter's ghostly puffs, the guitarist's sharp twangs and the fiddler's angled multiphonics with occasional metallic string thumps and irregular drum beats allows for few pauses... Perhaps the appearance of Graffiti in Two Parts will tempt someone to release those tapes of Davidson's piano playing that are rumored to exist in the Boston area."

Michael Rosenstein of Dusted Magazine noted: "this is only the second recording of Lowell Davidson, and the only one to capture his mature voice is enough to recommend it alone. But this document is far more than that, and nearly four decades on, it sounds as captivating and inspired as the night it was performed."

Point of Departure's Ed Hazell, who attended the concert, described the music as "a dense thicket of sound," and singled out Davidson's contribution on drums: "he used knitting needles instead of drum sticks, sometimes holding four or more between his fingers. He edited himself as he played, hovering over the instruments, moving erratically around the kit, sometimes striking a surface, sometimes not... Noting resemblances to other drummers wouldn't be instructive, for there was never a more singular approach to the instrument."

== Track listing ==
Composed by Joe Morris, Lowell Davidson, Malcolm Goldstein, and Lawrence D. "Butch" Morris.

1. "Graffiti - Part I" – 37:22
2. "Graffiti - Part II" – 31:42
3. "Tag" – 0:53

== Personnel ==
- Joe Morris – guitar, banjouke
- Lawrence D. "Butch" Morris – cornet
- Malcolm Goldstein – violin
- Lowell Davidson – drums, aluminum acoustic bass
