= Jumping off the Page =

Studio album by Rob Brown
- Released: 2000
- Studios: Strobe-Light Sound, New York City
- Genre: Jazz
- Length: 54:58
- Label: No More
- Producer: Alan Schneider

Rob Brown chronology
Visage (2000)	Jumping off the Page (2000)	Round the Bend (2002)

Jumping off the Page is an album by American jazz saxophonist Rob Brown released in 2000 on No More, a label founded by producer Alan Schneider. It features a quartet with trumpeter Roy Campbell, bassist Chris Lightcap and drummer Jackson Krall.

== Reception ==
Professional ratings
Review scores
Source	Rating
AllMusic	4/5 stars

In his review for AllMusic, Thom Jurek states: "There are places, such as on 'Like a Top' and 'Step With Care,' where his own development in the Ornette Coleman school of melodic free improvisation shines forth as it leads the quartet into places it could never have expected to go." The JazzTimes review by Bill Shoemaker notes that "Brown and Campbell are particularly intriguing front-line partners, as they both have an undertone of testimony in every note they play."

== Track listing ==
All compositions by Rob Brown

1. "Twinkle" – 8:12
2. "Flat Out" – 5:47
3. "Elbow Figure" – 7:39
4. "Sonic Drawl" – 8;33
5. "Like a Top" – 7;29
6. "Charcoal Glow" – 3:27
7. "Step with Care" – 7:07
8. "Open Channel" – 6:44

== Personnel ==
- Rob Brown – alto sax, flute
- Roy Campbell - trumpet
- Chris Lightcap – bass
- Jackson Krall – drums
