= Transonic (album) =

Studio album by Whit Dickey
- Released: 1998
- Recorded: January 17, 1997
- Studio: Systems Two, Brooklyn
- Genre: Jazz
- Length: 52:36
- Label: AUM Fidelity
- Producer: Whit Dickey, Steven Joerg

Whit Dickey chronology
Transonic (1998)	Big Top (2000)

Transonic is the debut album by American jazz drummer Whit Dickey, recorded in 1997 and released on AUM Fidelity. For his first record as leader, Dickey went into the studio with long-time associate, saxophonist Rob Brown, and then relative newcomer to the scene, bassist Chris Lightcap. He notes that many of the cuts were inspired by two Thelonious Monk compositions, "Off Minor" & "Criss Cross", along with the magic of tenor saxophonist David S. Ware.

== Reception ==
Professional ratings
Review scores
Source	Rating
AllMusic	4/5 stars
The Penguin Guide to Jazz	3.5/4 stars

In his review for AllMusic, Hank Shteamer states that the album "features memorable writing, inspired performances, and a lush recording quality." The Penguin Guide to Jazz says that "Transonic its flaring and exciting trio free-jazz, much of it played at full tilt, yet never so chaotically noisy that you feel the players are blowing just for the hell of it."

The album was voted No. 3 in the Cadence Readers Poll for Top Records of 1998.

== Track listing ==
All compositions by Whit Dickey except as indicated

1. "Planet One" – 4:50
2. "Penumbra" – 6:19
3. "Transonic" – 9:16
4. "Second Skin" (Dickey/Brown/Lightcap) – 8:02
5. "Volleys" – 5:45
6. "Tableau" – 5:11
7. "Kinesis" (Dickey/Brown/Lightcap) – 3:36
8. "Skyhook" – 9:37

== Personnel ==
- Whit Dickey – drums
- Rob Brown – alto sax, flute
- Chris Lightcap – bass
