= Flip and Spike =

Studio album / Live album by Joe Morris
- Released: 1992
- Studio: The Outpost, Stoughton, MA (4, 10) Middle East, Cambridge, MA
- Genre: Jazz
- Length: 68:55
- Label: Riti
- Producer: Joe Morris & Anne Marcotty Morris

Joe Morris chronology
Sweatshop (1990)	Flip and Spike (1992)	Symbolic Gesture (1994)

Flip and Spike is an album by American jazz guitarist Joe Morris released in 1992 on his own Riti label. It features a trio with Jerome Deupree, who was the original drummer in the rock band Morphine, and bassist Sebastian Steinberg.

== Reception ==
Professional ratings
Review scores
Source	Rating
AllMusic	4.5/5 stars

In his review for AllMusic, Thom Jurek states "Flip & Spike is the first of Morris' recordings that articulate his signature investigations of the guitar as an instrument of sonic density and dexterity, not just as a solo vehicle. As such, and as a work of striking emotional commitment, it is quite remarkable."

In his book Honesty Is Explosive!: Selected Music Journalism, music writer Ben Watson claims about the album "Beneath the surface cool you sense a delirious funk. It creates a tension similar to the tumble-down-chaos-that-rocks in Beefheart."

== Track listing ==
All compositions by Joe Morris.

1. "Flip & Spike" – 7:44
2. "Itan" – 14:19
3. "Julianna" – 2:42
4. "Contemporarity" – 16:37
5. "Mnemonic Device #1" – 0:52
6. "Mnemonic Device #2" – 1:31
7. "Mnemonic Device #3" – 1:13
8. "Mnemonic Device #4" – 1:48
9. "Mombaccus" – 11:31
10. "Reflexes" – 10:38

== Personnel ==
- Joe Morris – guitar
- Sebastian Steinberg – acoustic bass
- Jerome Deupree – drums
