= We Are Not Obstinate Islands =

Live album by The Diplomats
- Released: 2006
- Recorded: October 29, 2004
- Venue: Bob Shop, Rochester, New York
- Genre: Jazz
- Length: 47:27
- Label: Clean Feed
- Producer: Harris Eisenstadt

Rob Brown chronology
Radiant Pools (2005)	We Are Not Obstinate Islands (2006)	Sounds (2007)

We Are Not Obstinate Islands is an album by The Diplomats, a collective trio consisting of saxophonist Rob Brown, trombonist Steve Swell and drummer Harris Eisenstadt. It was recorded live in Rochester, New York in 2004 and released on the Portuguese Clean Feed label. Swell played previously on Brown's album Radiant Pools.

== Reception ==
In a double review for All About Jazz, Jeff Stockton states "The five tracks are neither overlong nor too far out and while the musicians are clearly listening to each other and keying off each other's cues, no single player grabs more than his fair share of the spotlight... The Diplomats make their case concisely, with few unnecessary embellishments."

== Track listing ==
All compositions by Brown/Eisenstadt/Swell

1. "Down to the Roots" – 11:27
2. "Past the Roots" – 6:04
3. "The Unsure of Our Times" – 9:10
4. "The Unsure of Our Answers" – 10:10
5. "Buoyed in Great Days" – 10:36

== Personnel ==
- Rob Brown – alto sax
- Steve Swell – trombone
- Harris Eisenstadt - drums
