= Wildlife (Joe Morris album) =

Studio album by Joe Morris
- Released: 2009
- Recorded: March 16, 2008
- Studio: Riti Studios, Guilford, Connecticut
- Genre: Jazz
- Length: 56:36
- Label: AUM Fidelity
- Producer: Joe Morris

Joe Morris chronology
MVP LSD (2008)	Wildlife (2009)	The Necessary and the Possible (2009)

Wildlife is an album by American jazz musician Joe Morris, which was recorded in 2008 and released on the AUM Fidelity label. It was the debut recording by a new group featuring saxophonist Petr Cancura and drummer Luther Gray. Morris plays bass instead of guitar.

== Reception ==
Professional ratings
Review scores
Source	Rating
AllMusic	4.5/5 stars

In his review for AllMusic, Phil Freeman states "There's a lot of Ayler in Cancura's tone; he's a powerful player with a strong sense of melody, always retaining an essential cohesion within his solos, even at their most fervid. Gray is all over the kit, guiding the other two men and maintaining a forceful momentum."

The All About Jazz review by Troy Collins says that "The trio embraces a wide range of spatial dynamics on this expansive set, with the majority of their probing explorations conjuring the bristling frenzy of New Thing era expressionism."

== Track listing ==
All compositions by Morris / Cancura / Gray

1. "Geomantic" – 13:35
2. "Thicket" – 19:21
3. "Crow" – 10:06
4. "Nettle" – 13:34

== Personnel ==
- Joe Morris - bass
- Petr Cancura – tenor sax, alto sax
- Luther Gray – drums
