= Age of Everything =

Studio album by Joe Morris
- Released: 2002
- Recorded: January 20, 2002
- Studios: Riti Studios, Guilford, Connecticut
- Genre: Jazz
- Length: 53:05
- Label: Riti
- Producer: Joe Morris

Joe Morris chronology
Singularity (2001)	Age of Everything (2002)	Likewise (2003)

Age of Everything is an album by American jazz guitarist Joe Morris, which was recorded in 2002 and released on his own Riti label. He leads a new trio with bassist Timo Shanko and drummer Luther Gray.

== Reception ==
Professional ratings
Review scores
Source	Rating
The Penguin Guide to Jazz	3/4 stars

The Penguin Guide to Jazz states "Again, just four large slabs of music, uncompromisingly played and with that deceptively linear approach which suggests that harmonic depth isn't the first thing that excites the guitarist."

In an article for the Chicago Tribune, Howard Reich states "Whether improvising freely above a straight swing backbeat by bassist Timo Shanko and drummer Luther Gray or creating openly lyric melody lines in unaccompanied statements, Morris takes pains to give listeners entree into an otherwise rarefied but daringly innovative musical language."

== Track listing ==
All compositions by Joe Morris

1. "Tree Branch" – 11:43
2. "Way In" – 15:10
3. "Age of Everything" – 11:25
4. "Telepathy" – 14:47

== Personnel ==
- Joe Morris - guitar
- Timo Shanko – bass
- Luther Gray – drums
