= Like Rays =

Studio album by Joe Morris
- Released: 1998
- Recorded: June 1996
- Studio: Stephonia Studios, Concord, Massachusetts
- Genre: Jazz
- Length: 60:59
- Label: Knitting Factory
- Producer: Joe Morris

Joe Morris chronology
Racket Club (1998)	Like Rays (1998)	A Cloud of Black Birds (1998)

Ken Vandermark chronology
Baraka (1997)	Like Rays (1998)	Hidden in the Stomach (1998)

Like Rays is an album by American jazz guitarist Joe Morris with reedist Ken Vandermark, who played clarinet and bass clarinet, and German pianist Hans Poppel. It was recorded in 1996 and released on the Knitting Factory label.

== Reception ==
Professional ratings
Review scores
Source	Rating
The Penguin Guide to Jazz	3/4 stars

The Penguin Guide to Jazz notes that "Vandermark is a very impressive player, with a wide range of sonorities on his clarinets. Some of this pieces are dominates by him, to a degree that suggest the alphabetical listing of performers is no more than that and that this could usefully be reviewed as Ken's record."

In his review for JazzTimes Duck Baker states "There are moments of subtle understatement as well as bursting intensity, and it all flows along with the collective intent that characterizes free music (or any kind of jazz) when it's really happening."

== Track listing ==
All compositions by Morris/Vandermark/Poppel

1. "Photon" – 1:20
2. "New Fire" – 3:06
3. "Within Reach" – 5:27
4. "Like Rays" – 7:56
5. "So as to Touch" – 7:32
6. "Life Stuff" – 5:44
7. "Parlance" – 4:54
8. "I Can Live with That" – 6:22
9. "Hand Signals" – 7:39
10. "From Dreams" – 8:54
11. "Levitate" – 2:05

== Personnel ==
- Joe Morris - electric guitar
- Ken Vandermark – clarinet, bass clarinet
- Hans Poppel – piano
