= Joe Morris (guitarist) =

American jazz guitarist (born 1955)

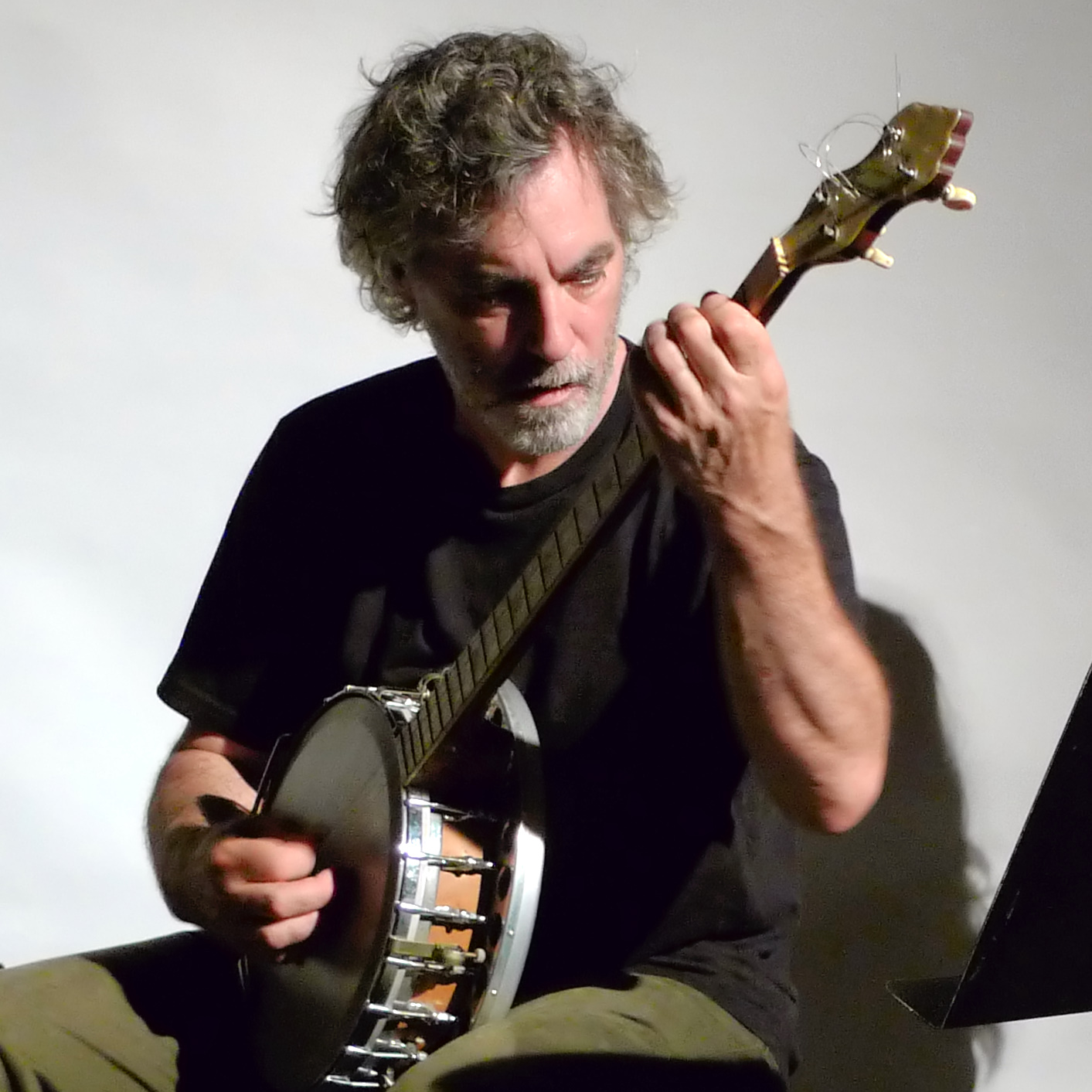
- Morris at the Vision Festival in 2010

Background information
- Born: Joseph Francis Michael Morris; September 13, 1955 (age 70); New Haven, Connecticut, U.S.
- Genres: Jazz, avant-garde, free jazz, free improvisation
- Occupations: Musician, composer, educator
- Instrument: Guitar
- Labels: Riti, Aum Fidelity, Leo, Soul Note, Knitting Factory, Clean Feed, ESP, Hathut, RogueArt
- Website: www.joe-morris.com

Joseph Francis Michael Morris (born September 13, 1955) is an American jazz guitarist, bassist, composer, and educator.

== Early life ==
Morris was born in New Haven, Connecticut, on September 13, 1955. He switched from trumpet to guitar at the age of fourteen. He was self-taught. His interest in jazz began two years later, after attending a John McLaughlin concert and listening to John Coltrane, Miles Davis, and Pharoah Sanders recordings.

== Later life and career ==
Morris moved to Boston in 1975, "where his unique approach was not initially accepted in the then-prevalent modal jazz scene. Despite this temporary setback, and some time spent playing guitar in Europe, he developed a pivotal collaborative relationship with multi-instrumentalist Lowell Davidson, whose unique sound explorations inspired him to further develop his own original approach to music making". Morris formed his first trio in 1977.

In 1981 Morris formed his own record company, Riti, for his own recordings. He has led a group called Sweatshop, the sextet Racket Club, and quartets featuring, separately, Mat Maneri, Jamie Saft, and Rob Brown.

In 1994 he became the first guitarist to lead his own session for Black Saint/Soul Note, with Symbolic Gesture. He has continued to record extensively for many labels such as Knitting Factory, AUM Fidelity, and Hathut. In addition to leading his own groups, he has recorded and performed with, among others: Matthew Shipp, William Parker, Joe Maneri, and Ivo Perelman.

He has lectured and conducted workshops throughout the US and Europe. He is a former member of the faculty of Tufts University Extension College and is on the faculty at New England Conservatory in the jazz and improvisation department.

== Influences and style ==
Morris cites as influences Cecil Taylor, Jimmy Lyons, Eric Dolphy, Leroy Jenkins, Thelonious Monk, Jimi Hendrix, and West African string music. Morris has created his own approach to playing and composing. "He usually incorporates a clean tone of the bebop lineage for his single-note-driven improvisations". He also plays banjolele.

== Discography ==
=== As leader/co-leader ===
Release year	Title	Label	Personnel/Notes
1983	Wraparound	Riti	Trio with Sebastian Steinberg (bass), Laurence Cook (drums)
1987	Human Rites	Riti	Trio with Sebastian Steinberg (bass), Thurman Barker (drums)
1990	Sweatshop	Riti	Trio with Sebastian Steinberg (bass), Jerome Deupree (drums)
1992	Flip and Spike	Riti	Trio with Sebastian Steinberg (bass), Jerome Deupree (drums)
1994	Symbolic Gesture	Soul Note	Trio with Nate McBride (bass), Curt Newton (drums)
1995	Illuminate	Leo	Quartet, co-led with Rob Brown (alto sax), William Parker (bass), Jackson Krall (drums)
1995	No Vertigo	Leo	
1996	Elsewhere	Homestead	Quartet with Matthew Shipp (piano), William Parker (bass), Whit Dickey (drums)
1997	You Be Me	Soul Note	Quartet with Mat Maneri (violin), Nate McBride (bass), Curt Newton (drums)
1997	Invisible Weave	No More	Duo with William Parker (bass)
1997	Antennae	AUM Fidelity	Trio with Nate McBride (bass), Jerome Deupree (drums)
1998	Racket Club	About Time	Sextet with Jim Hobbs (alto sax), Steve Norton (baritone sax), Nate McBride (electric bass), Jerome Deupree, Curt Newton (drums)
1998	Like Rays	Knitting Factory	Free improvisation trio with Ken Vandermark (clarinet), Hans Poppel (piano)
1998	A Cloud of Black Birds	AUM Fidelity	Quartet with Chris Lightcap (bass), Mat Maneri (violin), Jerome Deupree (drums)
1999	Deep Telling	Okka Disk	With the DKV Trio: Hamid Drake (drums), Kent Kessler (bass), Ken Vandermark (tenor sax)
1999	Many Rings	Knitting Factory	Quartet with Karen Borca (bassoon), Rob Brown (alto sax, flute), Andrea Parkins (accordion, sampler)
1999	Underthru	OmniTone	Quartet with Mat Maneri (violin), Chris Lightcap (bass), Gerald Cleaver (drums)
2000	Soul Search	AUM Fidelity	Duo with Mat Maneri (electric violin)
2000	At the Old Office	Knitting Factory	Quartet with Mat Maneri (violin), Chris Lightcap (bass), Gerald Cleaver (drums)
2001	Singularity	AUM Fidelity	Solo guitar
2002	Age of Everything	Riti	Trio with Timo Shanko (bass), Luther Gray (drums)
2003	Likewise	Riti	As part of the band Stone House; trio with Luther Gray (drums), Rob Brown (alto sax, flute)
2005	Beautiful Existence	Clean Feed	Quartet with Jim Hobbs (alto sax), Timo Shanko (bass), Luther Gray (drums)
2007	Rebus	Clean Feed	Free improvisation trio with Ken Vandermark (tenor sax), Luther Gray (drums)
2008	High Definition	hatOLOGY	As the band Bass Quartet, with Taylor Ho Bynum (cornet, trumpet, flugelhorn), Allan Chase (saxophones), Luther Gray (drums)
2008	Elm City Duets	Clean Feed	Duo with Barre Phillips (bass)
2009	MVP LSD	Riti	Trio with John Voigt (bass), Tom Plsek (trombone)
2009	Wildlife	AUM Fidelity	Trio with Petr Cancura (saxophones), Luther Gray (drums)
2009	The Necessary and the Possible	Victo	Free improvisation trio with Simon H. Fell (bass), Alex Ward (clarinet)
2009	Colorfield	ESP-Disk	Trio with Steve Lantner (piano), Luther Gray (drums)
2009	Today on Earth	AUM Fidelity	Quartet with Jim Hobbs (alto sax), Timo Shanko (bass), Luther Gray (drums)
2010	Tooth And Nail	Clean Feed	Duo with Nate Wooley (trumpet)
2010	Creatures	Not Two	Duo with Luther Gray (drums)
2010	Camera	ESP-Disk	Quartet with Luther Gray (drums), Katt Hernandez (violin), Junko Fujiwara Simons (cello)
2010	Sensor	No Business	Solo bass (LP only)
2010	Night Logic	RogueArt	Trio with Marshall Allen (alto sax, flute, EVI), Matthew Shipp (piano)
2011	Traits	Riti	As the band Wildlife; quartet with Luther Gray (drums), Petr Cancura (tenor sax), Jim Hobbs (alto sax)
2011	Ambrosia	Riti	Duo with Agustí Fernández (piano)
2011	XYX	Northern Spy	As the band The Spanish Donkey; trio with Jamie Saft (keyboards), Mike Pride (drums)
2012	Graffiti in Two Parts	RogueArt	Quartet with Lowell Davidson (drums, bass), Malcolm Goldstein (violin), Lawrence D. "Butch" Morris (cornet). Recorded in 1985
2012	Altitude	AUM Fidelity	Trio with William Parker (bass, sintir), Gerald Cleaver (drums)
2012	From the Discrete to the Particular	Relative Pitch	Free improvisation trio with Agustí Fernández (piano), Nate Wooley (trumpet)
2013	Black Aces	RareNoise	As the band Slobber Pup; quartet with Jamie Saft (keyboards), Trevor Dunn (bass), Balázs Pándi (drums)
2014	Balance	Clean Feed	Quartet with Mat Maneri (viola), Chris Lightcap (bass), Gerald Cleaver (drums)
2014	Red Hill	RareNoise	Quartet with Wadada Leo Smith (trumpet), Jamie Saft (piano, electric piano), Balázs Pándi (drums)
2014	Storms	Glacial Erratic	Duo with Chris Cretella (acoustic guitar)
2014	Mess Hall	hatOLOGY	Trio with Jerome Deupree (drums), Steve Lantner (electronic keyboard)
2015	Ninth Square	Clean Feed	Free improvisation trio with Evan Parker (saxophones), Nate Wooley (trumpet)
2015	Raoul	RareNoise	As the band The Spanish Donkey; trio with Jamie Saft (keyboards), Mike Pride (drums)
2015	Ticonderoga	Clean Feed	Quartet with Joe McPhee (saxophones), Jamie Saft (piano), Charles Downs (drums)
2015	Pole Axe	RareNoise	As the band Slobber Pup; quartet with Jamie Saft (keyboards), Mats Gustafsson (tenor sax), Balázs Pándi (drums)
2015	Solos Bimhuis	Relative Pitch	Solo guitar
2016	Shock Axis	Relative Pitch	Trio with Chris Cretella (electric bass), Dave Parmelee (drums)
2018	Geometry of Caves	Relative Pitch	Quartet with Tomeka Reid (cello), Kyoko Kitamura (voice), Taylor Ho Bynum (cornet, trumpet)
2019	Geometry of Distance	Relative Pitch	Quartet with Tomeka Reid (cello), Kyoko Kitamura (voice), Taylor Ho Bynum (cornet, trumpet)

=== As sideman ===
Release year	Leader	Title	Label
1992	Rob Brown	Youniverse	Riti
2023	Jeff Platz	Sun Spells	Setola di Maiale
2005	Rob Brown	Radiant Pools	RogueArt
2009	Petr Cancura	Fine Objects	Not Two
2000	Whit Dickey	Big Top	Wobbly Rail
2002	Whit Dickey	Prophet Moon	Riti
2004	Whit Dickey	Coalescence	Clean Feed
2005	Whit Dickey	In a Heartbeat	Clean Feed
2006	Whit Dickey	Sacred Ground	Clean Feed
2008	Hamid Drake	Blissful	RogueArt
2009	Flow Trio	Rejuvenation	ESP-Disk
2011	Flow Trio	Set Theory, Live at the Stone	Ayler
2006	Dennis Gonzalez	No Photograph Available	Clean Feed
2009	Dennis Gonzalez	Songs of Early Autumn	No Business
2011	Ingebrigt Håker Flaten	Now Is	Clean Feed
2010	Stephen Haynes	Parrhesia	Engine
2015	Stephen Haynes	Pomegranate	New Atlantis
2008	Jim Hobbs	The Story of Mankind	Not Two
2011	Noah Kaplan	Descendants	hatOLOGY
2017	Noah Kaplan	Cluster Swerve	hatOLOGY
2000	Steve Lantner	Voices Lowered	Leo
2004	Steve Lantner	Saying So	Riti
2005	Steve Lantner	Blue Yonder	Skycap
2006	Steve Lantner	Paradise Road	Skycap
2007	Steve Lantner	What You Can Throw	hatOLOGY
2008	Steve Lantner	Given – Live in Munster	hatOLOGY
2004	Daniel Levin	Don't Go it Alone	Riti
2006	Daniel Levin	Some Trees	hatOLOGY
2007	Daniel Levin	Blurry	hatOLOGY
1995	Joe Maneri	Three Men Walking	ECM
1996	Joe Maneri	Out Right Now	hatOLOGY
2002	William Parker	Eloping with the Sun	Riti
2007	William Parker	Double Sunrise Over Neptune	AUM Fidelity
2016	William Parker	Counteract This Turmoil Like Trees And Birds	RogueArt
1997	Ivo Perelman	Strings	Leo
2011	Ivo Perelman	The Hour of the Star	Leo
2012	Ivo Perelman	Family Ties	Leo
2012	Ivo Perelman	Living Jelly	Leo
2013	Ivo Perelman	One	RareNoise
2015	Ivo Perelman	Counterpoint	Leo
2016	Ivo Perelman	Blue	Leo
2016	Ivo Perelman	Breaking Point	Leo
2016	Ivo Perelman	The Art Of The Improv Trio Volume 5	Leo
2016	Ivo Perelman	The Art Of The Improv Trio Volume 6	Leo
1997	Matthew Shipp	Thesis	hatOLOGY
2007	Matthew Shipp	Piano Vortex	Thirsty Ear
2008	Matthew Shipp	Right Hemisphere	RogueArt
2008	Matthew Shipp	Cosmic Suite	Not Two
2009	Matthew Shipp	Harmonic Disorder	Thirsty Ear
2010	Matthew Shipp	Broken Partials	Not Two
2009	David S. Ware	Shakti	AUM Fidelity

== Books ==
- Morris, Joe. Perpetual Frontier / The Properties of Free Music. Riti Publishing, 2012.
