= Camera (album) =

Studio album by Joe Morris
- Released: 2010
- Recorded: April 3, 2010
- Studio: Phillips Academy, Andover, Massachusetts
- Genre: Jazz
- Length: 50:29
- Label: ESP-Disk

Joe Morris chronology
Creatures (2010)	Camera (2010)	Sensor (2010)

Camera is an album by American jazz guitarist Joe Morris, which was recorded in 2010 and released on the ESP-Disk label. He leads a quartet with long-time collaborator Luther Gray on drums and a string section composed of Katt Hernandez on violin and Junko Fujiwara Simons on cello.

== Reception ==
Professional ratings
Review scores
Source	Rating
AllMusic	3.5/5 stars

In his review for AllMusic, Alex Henderson states "Camera has a bit of Euro-classical appeal, but there is no overlooking the fact that this is edgy, free jazz. Morris thrives on the abstract, and he thrives on a stream of consciousness approach. But for all its intellect, Camera also has a great deal of passion."

== Track listing ==
All compositions by Joe Morris

1. "Person in a Place" – 9:39
2. "Street Scene" – 7:29
3. "Angle of Incidence" – 6:45
4. "Evocative Shadow" – 8:05
5. "Patterns on Faces" – 8:48
6. "Reflected Object" – 9:43

== Personnel ==
- Joe Morris - guitar
- Luther Gray – drums
- Katt Hernandez – violin
- Junko Fujiwara Simons – cello
