= Radiant Pools =

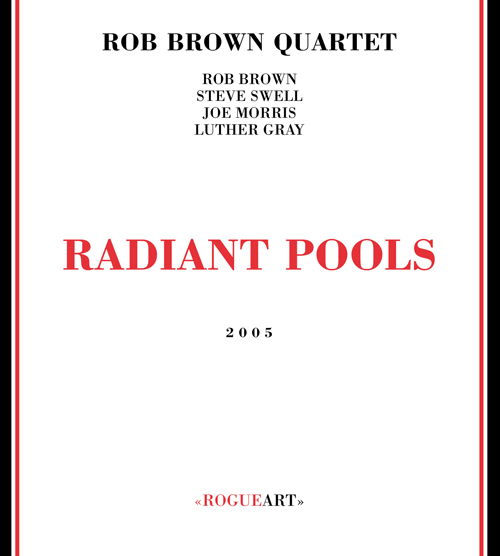

Studio album by Rob Brown
- Released: 2005
- Recorded: July 13, 2004
- Studio: Peter Karl Audio Services, New York City
- Genre: Jazz
- Length: 57:49
- Label: RogueArt
- Producer: Michel Dorbon

Rob Brown chronology
The Big Picture (2004)	Radiant Pools (2005)	We Are Not Obstinate Islands (2006)

Radiant Pools is an album by American jazz saxophonist Rob Brown which was recorded in 2004 and released on the French RogueArt label. He leads a quartet with Steve Swell on trombone, Joe Morris on double bass instead of guitar and Luther Gray on drums.

== Reception ==
Professional ratings
Review scores
Source	Rating
AllMusic	4/5 stars

In his review for AllMusic, Alain Drouot states "What makes this recording particularly successful is the fine interplay between Brown and Swell. The pieces often feature exciting but subtle dialogues and counterpoint. The pair's ideas are carefully developed and their attention to detail pays dividends as the two musicians stimulate and/or support one another."

In a double review for All About Jazz, Clifford Allen observes that "Where Morris' music can suggest a somber Mark Rothko-like atmosphere, even in its most lickety-split moments, the music of Rob Brown suggests an urbane fauvism not unlike the paintings of Bob Thompson."

== Track listing ==
All compositions by Rob Brown except as indicated

1. "Boxed Set" (Steve Swell) – 6:32
2. "Semantics-1" (Brown/Swell/Morris/Gray) – 9:51
3. "Out of the Lurch" – 5:35
4. "Radiant Pools" – 7:40
5. "King Cobra" (Joe Morris) – 8:48
6. "Semantics-2" (Brown/Swell/Morris/Gray) – 9:27
7. "Swarm Village" – 9:41

== Personnel ==
- Rob Brown – alto sax, flute
- Steve Swell - trombone
- Joe Morris – bass
- Luther Gray – drums
