= Sonic Explorations =

Studio album by Matthew Shipp & Rob Brown
- Released: 1988
- Recorded: November 19, 1987 (tracks 7–10 February 14, 1988)
- Studio: Evergreen, New York (track 7–10 Sorcerer Sound, New York)
- Genre: Jazz
- Length: LP: 44:58; CD: 54:45
- Label: Cadence Jazz
- Producer: Matthew Shipp, Rob Brown

Matthew Shipp chronology
Sonic Explorations (1988)	Points (1992)

Rob Brown chronology
Sonic Explorations (1988)	Breath Rhyme (1989)

Sonic Explorations is the debut album by American jazz pianist Matthew Shipp and alto saxophonist Rob Brown, issued on LP in 1988 on Cadence Jazz.

Both musicians played together for about 5 years before. "Sonic Explorations" is a suite in 6 sections (including a piano solo and a sax solo section). The duo also plays jazz standards Oleo by Sonny Rollins and Blue in Green (credited to Miles Davis on Kind of Blue, but Shipp believes that Bill Evans wrote the piece). "I love Bill Evans even though a lot of people don't connect my playing with him at all. I learned a lot from him about phrasing, harmonic possibilities of the piano", Shipp says. The 2000 CD reissue adds additional takes of both standards.

== Reception ==
Professional ratings
Review scores
Source	Rating
AllMusic	3/5 stars
The Penguin Guide to Jazz	3.5/4 stars

In his review for AllMusic, Thom Jurek states "This duet by Matthew Shipp and Rob Brown from the late '80s offers a slice-of-the-pie view of Shipp's rethinking his own approach to improvisation and ensemble playing." The Penguin Guide to Jazz says that "there's much detailed interplay between piano and saxophone, with Brown's beautiful tone and ripping phrasing pushing the pianist into an accompanying role at times."

== Track listing ==
All compositions by Matthew Shipp except as indicated

1. "Sonic Explorations Section 1" - 8:07
2. "Sonic Explorations Section 2" - 4:10
3. "Sonic Explorations Section 3" - 5:46
4. "Sonic Explorations Section 4" - 4:08
5. "Sonic Explorations Section 5" (Rob Brown) - 5:21
6. "Sonic Explorations Section 6" - 9:44
7. "Oleo" (Sonny Rollins) - 3:32
8. "Blue in Green" (Miles Davis / Bill Evans) - 6:10
9. "Oleo - take 2" (Sonny Rollins) - 3:37
10. "Blue in Green - take 2" (Miles Davis / Bill Evans) - 4:10

8 & 9 does not appear on original LP

== Personnel ==
- Matthew Shipp - piano
- Rob Brown - alto sax
