= Symbolic Gesture =

Studio album by Joe Morris
- Released: 1994
- Recorded: June 12, 1993
- Studio: The Outpost, Stoughton, MA
- Genre: Jazz
- Length: 53:49
- Label: Soul Note
- Producer: Joe Morris

Joe Morris chronology
Flip and Spike (1992)	Symbolic Gesture (1994)	Illuminate (1995)

Symbolic Gesture is an album by American jazz guitarist Joe Morris, which was recorded in 1993 and released on the Italian Soul Note label. It features his trio with bassist Nate McBride and drummer Curt Newton. After four records on his own Riti label, this was his debut on another imprint and the first guitarist-led album in the twenty-year history of Black Saint/Soul Note.

== Reception ==
Professional ratings
Review scores
Source	Rating
The Penguin Guide to Jazz	3/4 stars
Down Beat	4.5/5 stars

The Penguin Guide to Jazz states "As a first point of contact, it is slightly soft-centred." In a double review for Down Beat, John Corbett says about the album that "is a perfect introduction. Morris is a slinky melodist with an Ornettish approach to refracting the blues."

== Track listing ==
All compositions by Joe Morris

1. "Invisible" – 9:07
2. "Lowell's House" – 14:05
3. "Symbolic Gesture" – 13:34
4. "Finite/Margin" – 9:26
5. "The Lookman" – 7:37

== Personnel ==
- Joe Morris – guitar
- Nate McBride – bass
- Curt Newton – drums
