= Elsewhere (Joe Morris album) =

Studio album by Joe Morris
- Released: 1996
- Recorded: February 26, 1996
- Studio: Sorcerer Sound, New York
- Genre: Jazz
- Length: 60:09
- Label: Homestead
- Producer: Joe Morris, Steven Joerg

Joe Morris chronology
No Vertigo (1995)	Elsewhere (1996)	You Be Me (1997)

Elsewhere is an album by the American jazz guitarist Joe Morris, recorded in 1996 and released on Homestead. The Joe Morris Ensemble features pianist Matthew Shipp's regular trio with bassist William Parker and drummer Whit Dickey. Morris and Shipp played together once with violinist Mat Maneri in Boston four or five years before.

== Reception ==
Professional ratings
Review scores
Source	Rating
AllMusic	3/5 stars
The Penguin Guide to Jazz	3.5/4 stars

In his review for AllMusic, David R. Adler states: "Morris is highly compelling throughout, both in terms of technique and sonic creation." The Penguin Guide to Jazz wrote that "Morris' dogged concentration on melody and his refusal to fall back on harmonic cushions and props is communicated to his three partners, all of whom also have a strong stake in this brand of ragged improvisation."

== Track listing ==
All compositions by Joe Morris

1. "Plexus" – 8:03
2. "Elsewhere" – 13:58
3. "Cirrus" – 5:13
4. "Violet" – 11:37
5. "Mind's Eye" – 6:16
6. "Rotunda" – 15:02

== Personnel ==
- Joe Morris - guitar
- Matthew Shipp – piano
- William Parker – bass
- Whit Dickey – drums
