= Trait =

Trait may refer to:

- Phenotypic trait in biology, which involve genes and characteristics of organisms
- Genotypic trait, sometimes but not always presenting as a phenotypic trait
- Personality, traits that predict an individual's behavior.
  - Trait theory in psychology
- Trait (computer programming), a model for structuring object-oriented programs (a template class in the C++ programming language)

== Entertainment ==
- Trait (album), the first and only EP by the industrial rock/metal band Pailhead
- Traits (Joe Morris album)
- Trait (role-playing games), a type of role-playing statistic
