= Sounds (Rob Brown album) =

Studio album by Rob Brown
- Released: 2007
- Recorded: November 23, 2006
- Studio: Firehouse 12, New Haven
- Genre: Jazz
- Length: 57:39
- Label: Clean Feed
- Producer: Rob Brown

Rob Brown chronology
| We Are Not Obstinate Islands (2006) | Sounds (2007) | Right Hemisphere (2008) |

Sounds is an album by American jazz saxophonist Rob Brown recorded in 2006 and released on the Portuguese Clean Feed label. Instead of the conventional sax-bass-drums trio, it features an alternative combination with Brown on alto sax, Daniel Levin on cello and Japanese Satoshi Takeishi on a percussion set completed with taiko drums.

The title track is a three-part suite composed for a multimedia performance that includes dance and visual art. It was debuted at the 2005 Vision Festival with the Nancy Zendora Dance Company and video art by Jo Wood-Brown.

== Reception ==
Professional ratings
Review scores
| Source | Rating |
|---|---|
| The Penguin Guide to Jazz | 4/4 stars |

The All About Jazz review by Sean Patrick Fitzell notes that "The textural range of the instrumentation, particularly the exotic percussion and the music's spaciousness of form allows for non-idiomatic exploration that is not strictly free improvisation."

The Penguin Guide to Jazz states "A logical move to employ Levin, given how much Brown seems to relish a singing bass tone and long, legato lines... Things as 'Stutter Step' underline how much of Brown's language still comes from the '60s avant-garde, but there is considerable more going on here."

== Track listing ==
All compositions by Rob Brown except as indicated

1. "Sounds part I Archaeology" – 12:30
2. "Sounds part II Antics" – 6:27
3. "Sounds part III Astir" – 10:34
4. "Sutter Step" – 4:25
5. "Tibetan Folk Song" (Traditional) – 8:47
6. "Sinew" – 7:33
7. "Moment of Pause" – 7:23

== Personnel ==
- Rob Brown – alto sax
- Daniel Levin - cello
- Satoshi Takeishi – percussion
