= Colorfield (album) =

Studio album by Joe Morris
- Released: 2009
- Recorded: May 12, 2009
- Studios: 7A West Studios, Charlestown, Massachusetts
- Genre: Jazz
- Length: 50:06
- Label: ESP-Disk
- Producer: Joe Morris

Joe Morris chronology
The Necessary and the Possible (2009)	Colorfield (2009)	Today on Earth (2009)

Colorfield is an album by American jazz guitarist Joe Morris, which was recorded in 2009 and released on the ESP-Disk label. He leads a trio with pianist Steve Lantner, in his first recording with Morris as leader, and long-time collaborator drummer Luther Gray. The music is inspired, in part, by the Color Field school of painting, in which large patches of color, occasionally just one color, make up the composition. Another inspiration for the music is the early Cecil Taylor Unit recordings with Jimmy Lyons on alto saxophone and either Sunny Murray or Andrew Cyrille on drums.

== Reception ==
Professional ratings
Review scores
Source	Rating
AllMusic	4.5/5 stars
Down Beat	4/5 stars

In his review for AllMusic, Michael G. Nastos states "While there's a clear and present acknowledgment to the old Cecil Taylor Unit's of the '70s, Morris and the trio avoid any clichés while adopting their extended expressionist ideals and the then-new attitude toward making music without boundaries or timing issues that still works."

The All About Jazz review by Jerry D'Souza says "Morris, Lantner and Gray are both subtle and powerful; it is the balance of these attributes that makes Colorfield a CD of highly crafted artistry."

In a review for Down Beat Bill Meyer notes that "this record ask more of the listener than Morris' comparatively streamlined quartet recordings on Hatology and Aum Fidelity. But just as you’ll only perceive a painting’s subtle variations of tone and hue after extended contemplation, the closer you listen, the more Colorfield's music deepens, expands and ultimately envelops you."

== Track listing ==
All compositions by Joe Morris

1. "Transparent" – 6:52
2. "Silver Sun" – 13:42
3. "Purple Distant" – 13:39
4. "Bell Orange Curves" – 15:53

== Personnel ==
- Joe Morris - guitar
- Steve Lantner – piano
- Luther Gray – drums
