= Runner (album) =

Studio album by the Sea and Cake
- Released: September 17, 2012
- Studio: Soma Electronic Music Studios
- Genre: Indie rock, post-rock
- Length: 39:48
- Label: Thrill Jockey

The Sea and Cake chronology
The Moonlight Butterfly (2011)	Runner (2012)	Any Day (2018)

Professional ratings
Aggregate scores
Source	Rating
Metacritic	79/100
Review scores
Source	Rating
AllMusic	4/5 stars
BBC Music	favorable
Consequence of Sound	C+
DIY	8/10
Pitchfork	7.2/10
The Quietus	favorable
Slant Magazine	3.5/5 stars

Runner is the tenth studio album by the Sea and Cake, released on Thrill Jockey.

== Track listing ==
No.	Title	Length
1.	"On and On"	3:49
2.	"Harps"	4:07
3.	"A Mere"	4:22
4.	"The Invitations"	4:22
5.	"Skyscraper"	2:56
6.	"Harbor Bridges"	3:30
7.	"New Patterns"	5:39
8.	"Neighbors and Township"	3:49
9.	"Pacific"	2:38
10.	"The Runner"	4:36

Japanese edition bonus track
No.	Title	Length
11.	"Green Line"	2:31

== Personnel ==
- Sam Prekop – vocals, guitar, synthesizer
- Archer Prewitt – guitar, organ
- Eric Claridge – bass guitar
- John McEntire – drums, keyboards, percussion
- Heba Kadry – mastering

== Charts ==
Chart	Peak position
US Heatseekers Albums (Billboard)	22
