= The Biz (album) =

Studio album by the Sea and Cake
- Released: October 10, 1995
- Recorded: April 1995 at Soma, Chicago
- Genres: Indie; Post rock
- Length: 38:03
- Label: Thrill Jockey
- Producer: John McEntire

The Sea and Cake chronology
Nassau (1995)	The Biz (1995)	The Fawn (1997)

The Biz is the third album by the American band the Sea and Cake, released in 1995. It was recorded at John McEntire's studio.

== Critical reception ==
Professional ratings
Review scores
Source	Rating
AllMusic	4/5 stars

Trouser Press stated: "Where most of Prekop's previous output shuffles, The Biz meanders; dynamic grooves give way to lazy jamming, hooks are outnumbered by pointless riffing and some of the mellower material would be right at home on a lite-rock radio station." The Chicago Tribune called the album "a stunning amalgam of infectious hooks and thoughtful experimentation."

AllMusic wrote: "A less structured record than previous efforts, The Biz is also the Sea and Cake's most subdued: songs like the title track, 'Station in the Valley' and 'Sending' are loose and languid, favoring a more jam-oriented and subconscious vibe over the taut dynamics of earlier work." Paste listed it as the 20th best indie rock album of 1995.

== Track listing ==
1. "The Biz" – 4:01
2. "Leeora" – 4:23
3. "The Kiss" – 3:46
4. "Station in the Valley" – 4:54
5. "Darkest Night" – 3:49
6. "Sending" – 2:29
7. "Escort" – 4:28
8. "An Assassin" – 3:07
9. "The Transaction" – 3:33
10. "For Minor Sky" – 3:33

== Personnel ==
- Sam Prekop – vocals, guitar
- Archer Prewitt – guitar, organ, vibes
- Eric Claridge – bass
- John McEntire – drums, electric piano, organ, vibes
