= One Bedroom =

Studio album by the Sea and Cake
- Released: January 21, 2003
- Studio: Soma Electronic Music Studios
- Genre: Indie rock, post-rock
- Length: 39:51
- Label: Thrill Jockey

The Sea and Cake chronology
Oui (2000)	One Bedroom (2003)	Glass (2003)

Professional ratings
Aggregate scores
Source	Rating
Metacritic	79/100
Review scores
Source	Rating
AllMusic	4/5 stars
The Guardian	2/5 stars
Pitchfork	7.0/10

One Bedroom is the sixth studio album by the Sea and Cake, released on Thrill Jockey.

== Track listing ==
All tracks are written by the Sea and Cake, except "Sound & Vision" by David Bowie.

No.	Title	Length
1.	"Four Corners"	5:44
2.	"Left Side Clouded"	3:15
3.	"Hotel Tell"	4:01
4.	"Le Baron"	4:04
5.	"Shoulder Length"	3:09
6.	"One Bedroom"	3:58
7.	"Interiors"	4:19
8.	"Mr. F"	4:19
9.	"Try Nothing"	2:56
10.	"Sound & Vision"	4:06

Japanese edition bonus tracks
No.	Title	Length
11.	"Kids Look Like Cats"	3:06
12.	"Peep Show"	3:15

== Personnel ==
- Sam Prekop – vocals, guitar, synthesizer
- Archer Prewitt – guitar, piano, synthesizer, vocals
- Eric Claridge – bass guitar
- John McEntire – drums, percussion, piano, synthesizer
- Mikael Jorgensen – electric piano (on "One Bedroom" and "Interiors")
- John Navin – vocals (on "Sound & Vision")
- Frank Navin – vocals (on "Sound & Vision")

== Charts ==
Chart	Peak position
US Independent Albums (Billboard)	16
