= Everybody (The Sea and Cake album) =

Studio album by the Sea and Cake
- Released: May 8, 2007
- Studio: Key Club in Benton Harbor, Michigan; Soma Electronic Music Studios in Chicago, Illinois
- Genre: Indie rock, post-rock
- Length: 36:32
- Label: Thrill Jockey

The Sea and Cake chronology
Glass (2003)	Everybody (2007)	Car Alarm (2008)

Professional ratings
Aggregate scores
Source	Rating
Metacritic	74/100
Review scores
Source	Rating
AllMusic	3.5/5 stars
Exclaim!	favorable
Pitchfork	7.6/10
PopMatters	6/10 stars
Spin	favorable
Stylus Magazine	B

Everybody is the seventh studio album by the Sea and Cake, released on Thrill Jockey.

== Critical reception ==
At Metacritic, which assigns a weighted average score out of 100 to reviews from mainstream critics, Everybody received an average score of 74% based on 24 reviews, indicating "generally favorable reviews".

Jason Crock of Pitchfork gave the album a 7.6 out of 10, saying, "It's been four years since their last album, and Chicago's post-rock heyday has past, but the Sea and Cake remain relevant simply by becoming more transparent." Michael Franco of PopMatters gave the album 6 stars out of 10, stating that "this is the most rock-based album the Sea and Cake have made, but it still sounds modern, sophisticated, and ultra-cool." Vish Khanna of Exclaim! called it "a mature yet adventurous effort by the Sea and Cake."

== Track listing ==
No.	Title	Length
1.	"Up on Crutches"	3:36
2.	"Too Strong"	2:52
3.	"Crossing Line"	2:46
4.	"Middlenight"	3:32
5.	"Coconut"	2:54
6.	"Exact to Me"	3:39
7.	"Lightning"	4:11
8.	"Introducing"	3:22
9.	"Left On"	4:53
10.	"Transparent"	4:47

Japanese edition bonus tracks
No.	Title	Length
11.	"Mis"	2:57
12.	"Breathless"	3:59

== Personnel ==
- Sam Prekop – vocals, guitar
- Archer Prewitt – guitar, vocals, keyboards
- Eric Claridge – bass guitar, keyboards
- John McEntire – drums, vibraphone, keyboards, percussion
- Ken Champion – pedal steel guitar

== Charts ==
Chart	Peak position
US Heatseekers Albums (Billboard)	9
US Independent Albums (Billboard)	32
