= The Moonlight Butterfly =

Studio album by the Sea and Cake
- Released: May 10, 2011
- Studio: Soma Electronic Music Studios
- Genre: Indie rock, post-rock
- Length: 33:22
- Label: Thrill Jockey
- Producer: The Sea and Cake

The Sea and Cake chronology
Car Alarm (2008)	The Moonlight Butterfly (2011)	Runner (2012)

Professional ratings
Aggregate scores
Source	Rating
Metacritic	75/100
Review scores
Source	Rating
AllMusic	3/5 stars
Pitchfork	7.0/10
PopMatters	7/10 stars

The Moonlight Butterfly is the ninth studio album by the Sea and Cake, released on Thrill Jockey.

== Track listing ==
No.	Title	Length
1.	"Covers"	5:05
2.	"Lyric"	5:33
3.	"The Moonlight Butterfly"	4:05
4.	"Up on the North Shore"	3:59
5.	"Inn Keeping"	10:24
6.	"Monday"	4:16

== Personnel ==
- Sam Prekop – vocals, guitar
- Archer Prewitt – guitar, keyboards, ukulele
- Eric Claridge – bass guitar
- John McEntire – drums, synthesizer

== Charts ==
Chart	Peak position
US Heatseekers Albums (Billboard)	32
