= Sam Prekop (album) =

Studio album by Sam Prekop
- Released: February 9, 1999
- Length: 45:29
- Label: Thrill Jockey
- Producer: Jim O'Rourke

Sam Prekop chronology
| Sam Prekop (1999) | Who's Your New Professor (2005) |

Sam Prekop is the debut solo studio album by American musician Sam Prekop. It was released in February 9, 1999, through Thrill Jockey.

== Background ==
The album features contributions from Josh Abrams, Jim O'Rourke, Archer Prewitt, and Chad Taylor, as well as Rob Mazurek and John McEntire. It is entirely produced by O'Rourke.

== Critical reception ==
Professional ratings
Review scores
| Source | Rating |
|---|---|
| AllMusic | 4/5 stars |
| NME | 7/10 |
| Pitchfork | 8.9/10 |
| PopMatters | 6.8/10 |
| Rolling Stone | 3.5/5 stars |

Marc Weingarten of Rolling Stone commented that "Prekop's solo debut is an insidiously seductive exercise in chill-out cool; the best tracks brush up against you like a gentle breeze." He added, "Accompanied by a Chicago indie supergroup that includes guitarist Archer Prewitt and percussionist Chad Taylor, Prekop concocts quiet storms from quasi-samba beats, swelling strings, cascading melodies and his own whispered vocals." Sarah Zupko of PopMatters stated, "For the most part, Prekop's whispered vocals render the lyrics beside the point, acting as an improvisational instrument that is integral to the fine ensemble playing." Greg Kot of the Chicago Tribune wrote: "On his solo debut, the singer still suggests the breeziness of bossa nova and the nuance of after-hours jazz without actually embracing either style. The music has a slightly wider palette than his guitar-based bands, with keyboards, violins and cornet flavoring the arrangements."

== Track listing ==
All tracks are written by Sam Prekop, except where noted.

Sam Prekop track listing
| No. | Title | Writer(s) | Length |
|---|---|---|---|
| 1. | "Showrooms" | | 4:22 |
| 2. | "The Company" | | 4:17 |
| 3. | "Practice Twice" | | 4:06 |
| 4. | "A Cloud to the Back" | Josh Abrams; Jim O'Rourke; Prekop; Archer Prewitt; Chad Taylor | 3:56 |
| 5. | "Don't Bother" | | 5:21 |
| 6. | "Faces and People" | Abrams; Rob Mazurek; O'Rourke; Prekop; Prewitt; Taylor | 7:00 |
| 7. | "On Such Favors" | | 3:40 |
| 8. | "The Shadow" | | 4:48 |
| 9. | "Smaller Rivers" | | 2:41 |
| 10. | "So Shy" | | 5:19 |
| Total length: | | | 45:29 |

== Personnel ==
Credits adapted from liner notes.

- Sam Prekop – vocals, guitar, piano, arrangement, cover painting, design
- Jim O'Rourke – backing vocals, organ, electric piano, synthesized strings, guitar, slide guitar, six-string bass, arrangement, string arrangement, horn arrangement, production, recording, mixing
- Josh Abrams – double bass, bass guitar, arrangement
- Archer Prewitt – guitar, arrangement
- Chad Taylor – percussion, arrangement
- Rob Mazurek – cornet, horn arrangement
- John McEntire – triangle, maracas, tambourine
- Julie Pomerleau – violin, viola
- Phil Bonnett – recording assistance
- Sheila Sachs – design
