= Car Alarm (album) =

Studio album by the Sea and Cake
- Released: October 21, 2008
- Studio: Soma Electronic Music Studios
- Genre: Indie rock, post-rock
- Length: 38:30
- Label: Thrill Jockey

The Sea and Cake chronology
Everybody (2007)	Car Alarm (2008)	The Moonlight Butterfly (2011)

Professional ratings
Aggregate scores
Source	Rating
Metacritic	73/100
Review scores
Source	Rating
AllMusic	4/5 stars
Pitchfork	8.0/10
PopMatters	7/10 stars
Slant Magazine	3.5/5 stars
Spin	favorable

Car Alarm is the eighth studio album by the Sea and Cake, released on Thrill Jockey.

== Track listing ==
No.	Title	Length
1.	"Aerial"	4:18
2.	"A Fuller Moon"	4:08
3.	"On a Letter"	3:45
4.	"CMS Sequence"	1:06
5.	"Car Alarm"	3:16
6.	"Weekend"	2:42
7.	"New Schools"	3:33
8.	"Window Sills"	3:45
9.	"Down in the City"	3:25
10.	"Pages"	3:58
11.	"The Staircase"	2:59
12.	"Mirrors"	1:37

Japanese edition bonus track
No.	Title	Length
13.	"Also Ran"	2:59

== Personnel ==
- Sam Prekop – vocals, guitar, keyboards
- Archer Prewitt – guitar, keyboards, steel drums
- Eric Claridge – bass guitar
- John McEntire – drums, keyboards, steel drums, percussion

== Charts ==
Chart	Peak position
US Heatseekers Albums (Billboard)	12
