= Who's Your New Professor =

Studio album by Sam Prekop
- Released: March 8, 2005
- Length: 37:43
- Label: Thrill Jockey

Sam Prekop chronology
| Sam Prekop (1999) | Who's Your New Professor (2005) | Old Punch Card (2010) |

Who's Your New Professor is the second solo studio album by American musician Sam Prekop. It was released on March 8, 2005, through Thrill Jockey. It received generally favorable reviews from critics.

== Background ==
Who's Your New Professor is Sam Prekop's first solo studio album since Sam Prekop (1999). It includes contributions from Josh Abrams, Rob Mazurek, Archer Prewitt, Chad Taylor, and John McEntire.

== Critical reception ==
Professional ratings
Aggregate scores
| Source | Rating |
|---|---|
| Metacritic | 78/100 |
Review scores
| Source | Rating |
| AllMusic | 4.5/5 stars |
| Cokemachineglow | 77% |
| Pitchfork | 8.4/10 |
| Stylus Magazine | B |
| Tiny Mix Tapes | 4/5 stars |

According to the review aggregator Metacritic, Who's Your New Professor received "generally favorable reviews" based on a weighted average score of 78 out of 100 from 15 critic scores.

Noel Murray of The A.V. Club commented that "His 1999 solo debut was more overtly jazzy and semi-shrill, but the follow-up, Who's Your New Professor, goes the mellow route, running light percussion and muted horns under and around Prekop's whispery voice and delicate guitar." Nitsuh Abebe of Pitchfork stated, "this is anything but mood music: Prekop is a songwriter to be reckoned with, and the dynamics and arrangements on this disc have a depth that keeps luring you further in." Dom Sinacola of Cokemachineglow described the album as "a lilting, schizophrenic ride through a cove of trees; or through rows of tiny buildings; or on a one-horse open sleigh." Sarah Kahrl of Stylus Magazine commented that "it's easy to ignore it the first few times around." However, she added, "His brand of subtlety yields far greater rewards and make for a surfeit of future discoveries upon repeated listens."

== Track listing ==
All tracks are written by Sam Prekop.

Who's Your New Professor track listing
| No. | Title | Length |
|---|---|---|
| 1. | "Something" | 3:49 |
| 2. | "Magic Step" | 2:41 |
| 3. | "Dot Eye" | 4:37 |
| 4. | "Two Dedications" | 4:28 |
| 5. | "Chicago People" | 2:44 |
| 6. | "Little Bridges" | 3:00 |
| 7. | "A Splendid Hollow" | 2:39 |
| 8. | "C + F" | 4:32 |
| 9. | "Neighbor to Neighbor" | 1:35 |
| 10. | "Density" | 4:51 |
| 11. | "Between Outside" | 2:47 |
| Total length: | | 37:43 |

== Personnel ==
Credits adapted from liner notes.

- Sam Prekop – vocals, guitar, piano, arrangement, photography, artwork, design
- Josh Abrams – double bass, bass guitar, piano, electric piano, arrangement
- Rob Mazurek – cornet, arrangement
- Archer Prewitt – guitar, piano, arrangement
- Chad Taylor – drums, arrangement
- John McEntire – synthesizer, percussion, arrangement, recording, mixing
- Tim Iseler – recording
- Sheila Sachs – design
