= The Fawn (album) =

Studio album by the Sea and Cake
- Released: March 26, 1997
- Recorded: October 1996 at Soma, Chicago
- Genre: Indie; Post rock
- Length: 40:46
- Label: Thrill Jockey
- Producer: John McEntire

The Sea and Cake chronology
The Biz (1995)	The Fawn (1997)	Oui (2000)

Professional ratings
Review scores
Source	Rating
AllMusic	4/5 stars
The Encyclopedia of Popular Music	3/5 stars
Entertainment Weekly	A−
The New Rolling Stone Album Guide	3/5 stars

The Fawn is the fourth album by the Sea and Cake.

== Critical reception ==
The A.V. Club wrote that "everything the Sea and Cake touches turns to sweet, surprising, deadpan pop magic." The Washington Post called the songs "relatively pithy," writing that the band "doesn't try to overwhelm, but it underwhelms quite agreeably." CMJ New Music Monthly wrote that "fans of the earlier records will find The Fawn surprisingly dense-sounding, with its base layer of drum and keyboard filling the rests where silence used to be."

== Track listing ==
1. "Sporting Life" – 4:54
2. "The Argument" – 5:02
3. "The Fawn" – 3:07
4. "The Ravine" – 3:18
5. "Rossignol" – 3:30
6. "There You Are" – 4:48
7. "Civilise" – 3:21
8. "Bird and Flag" – 3:51
9. "Black Tree in the Bee Yard" – 3:04
10. "Do Now Fairly Well" – 5:51

== Personnel ==
- Sam Prekop – vocals, guitar
- Archer Prewitt – guitar, organ, vibes
- Eric Claridge – bass
- John McEntire – drums, electric piano
