= The Sea and Cake (album) =

Studio album by the Sea and Cake
- Released: October 20, 1994
- Recorded: September 1993
- Studio: Idful, Chicago, Illinois
- Genre: Indie rock; post-rock
- Length: 44:59
- Label: Thrill Jockey
- Producer: Brad Wood

The Sea and Cake chronology
The Sea and Cake (1994)	Nassau (1995)

The Sea and Cake is the debut studio album by American indie rock band the Sea and Cake. It was released on October 20, 1994 by Thrill Jockey.

== Critical reception ==
Professional ratings
Review scores
Source	Rating
AllMusic	4.5/5 stars
Chicago Tribune	3.5/4 stars
Guitar World	2 stars
The Rolling Stone Album Guide	4/5 stars

A Chicago Tribune reviewer wrote "The quartet has all the sleepy, idiosyncratic charm of Prekop’s former band, and the album [...] is recorded with a dry, close-up quality that highlights the combo’s jazz shadings". Writing for Guitar World, Jim Testa noted the group's "impeccable indie-rock credentials" and reviewed the album as "more like an afterthought than a fully realized project".

== Track listing ==
No.	Title	Length
1.	"Jacking the Ball"	3:50
2.	"Polio"	5:24
3.	"Bring My Car I Feel to Smash It"	4:25
4.	"Flat Lay the Water"	4:51
5.	"Choice Blanket"	5:10
6.	"Culabra Cut"	3:02
7.	"Bombay"	3:59
8.	"Showboat Angel"	4:37
9.	"So Long to the Captain"	5:04
10.	"Lost in Autumn"	4:37
