= Ombarrops! =

Studio album by The Car Is on Fire
- Released: 22 May 2009
- Recorded: December 2008 – February 2009
- Genres: Alternative rock, post-rock
- Length: 39:42
- Label: Pomaton EMI
- Producer: John McEntire

The Car Is on Fire chronology
Lake & Flames (2006)	Ombarrops! (2009)

Ombarrops! is the third and final studio album by Polish alternative rock band The Car Is on Fire. It was produced and mixed by John McEntire (Tortoise, The Sea and Cake, Gastr del Sol) and recorded in Soma Electronic Music Studios in Chicago. Guest appearances are made by McEntire himself and Aleksandra Tomaszewska (Aleks and the Drummer).

== Track listing ==
No.	Title	Length
1.	"Death Of a Customer"
2.	"Ombarrops!"
3.	"Cherry Cordial"
4.	"Strawberries"
5.	"Usignoli Celesti"
6.	"Evacuation"
7.	"Let's Be Friends"
8.	"Manuel"
9.	"We're Doing Fine, Minerva"
10.	"A Song Like No Other"
11.	"Baby Baby"
12.	"Swedish Samba, Swedish Love"
