= Clincher (EP) =

EP by Tar
- Released: 1993
- Genre: Rock
- Label: Touch and Go
- Producer: Brad Wood, Tar

Tar chronology
Jackson (1991)	Clincher (1993)	Toast (1993)

Clincher is an EP by the American band Tar, released in 1993. The band supported it with a North American tour that included shows with Jawbox.

== Production ==
The EP was produced by Brad Wood and Tar. It was named for a song that would appear on the band's next album, Toast. The band took a democratic approach to songwriting, playing together in the studio and then discussing what was working. They allowed the songs to take shape without having any ingrained ideas about form or genre, although they wanted more melodicism. Mark Zablocki and John Mohr played customized aluminum guitars; a photo of a Specimen Products guitar adorns the EP cover. "Teetering" is a remixed version of a previously released song. "Deep Throw" and "Solution 8" are live tracks; the studio version of the former had first appeared on a Sub Pop single. The band decided to include them because the originals were issued in limited presses.

== Critical reception ==
Professional ratings
Review scores
Source	Rating
AllMusic	3/5 stars
Chicago Sun-Times	3.5/4 stars
Fort Worth Star-Telegram	3.5/5 stars
MusicHound Rock: The Essential Album Guide	4/5 stars
Pittsburgh Post-Gazette	2.5/4 stars

The Chicago Sun-Times said that Tar "is one of the best of a group of bands that blur the lines between punk, heavy metal and industrial dance music." The Washington Post stated, "There's nothing showy here, but the explosion of noise atop the closing thump of 'G7' or the crunching change-up of 'Dean Martin' is all the justification these relentless pounders require." The Pittsburgh Post-Gazette noted that "Tar's specialty is in taking a menacing, mid-tempo riff, then throwing in sudden pauses, short stretches of bare-bones rhythm, and hoarse vocals until the hook becomes practically an epic." The Fort Worth Star-Telegram called the EP "abrasive, fundamental and, most of all, crude". The Morning Call praised the rawer sound and "claustrophobic feel". AllMusic said that Clincher "flirted with the grungy side of electric Neil Young".

== Track listing ==
No.	Title	Length
1.	"Lady Steps"
2.	"G7"
3.	"Dean Martin"
4.	"Good Part (Wrong Band)"
5.	"Teetering" (Ver.)
6.	"Solution 8" (Live)
7.	"Deep Throw" (Live)
