= Sons Of =

Studio album by Sam Prekop and John McEntire
- Released: July 22, 2022
- Recorded: 2021–2022
- Genre: Electronic
- Length: 56:12
- Label: Thrill Jockey

Sam Prekop and John McEntire chronology
Sons Of (2022)	A Yellow Robe Remixes (2023)

Sons Of is a collaborative studio album by American musicians Sam Prekop and John McEntire. It was released on July 22, 2022, through Thrill Jockey. It received universal acclaim from critics.

== Background ==
Sons Of is the debut studio album by the duo of Sam Prekop and John McEntire, both of whom are members of the Sea and Cake. The album originated from the duo's improvisational live sets performed in Europe during the autumn of 2019. The duo created the album using modular synthesizers, samplers, trigger pads, and various effects. It contains four songs: "A Ghost at Noon", "Crossing at the Shallow", "A Yellow Robe", and "Ascending by Night".

The Soft Pink Truth's two remix versions of "A Yellow Robe" were later released as A Yellow Robe Remixes in 2023.

== Critical reception ==
Professional ratings
Aggregate scores
Source	Rating
Metacritic	82/100
Review scores
Source	Rating
AllMusic	3.5/5 stars
Pitchfork	8.3/10
Uncut	4/5 stars
Under the Radar	8/10

According to the review aggregator Metacritic, Sons Of received "universal acclaim" based on a weighted average score of 82 out of 100 from 6 critic scores.

Fred Thomas of AllMusic commented that the album "finds them in a similar electronic mode as Prekop's more recent output, only pushing their slowly evolving instrumentals with house pulses and occasional disruptive squelches." He added, "Those expecting the organic post rock fusion of the bands McEntire and Prekop are best known for won't find it in the meditative lingering of Sons Of, but close listeners will hear the same airy melodic sensibilities and creative restlessness in these chilled-out synth tracks that are at the core of each player's best work with their respective bands." Philip Sherburne of Pitchfork stated, "Even as the music expands in length, it feels more immediately emotionally satisfying than any of Prekop's previous electronic music." He added, "Every track is awash in sumptuous, eminently hummable melodies; the album swells with a newfound sense of joy."

=== Accolades ===
Year-end lists for Sons Of
Publication	List	Rank	Ref.
NPR	The 50 Best Albums of 2022	41	
Pitchfork	The Best Electronic Music of 2022	—	
Spin	The 22 Best Albums of 2022	17	

== Track listing ==
Sons Of track listing
No.	Title	Length
1.	"A Ghost at Noon"	7:51
2.	"Crossing at the Shallow"	10:57
3.	"A Yellow Robe"	23:41
4.	"Ascending by Night"	13:41
Total length:		56:12

== Personnel ==
Credits adapted from liner notes.

- Sam Prekop – music
- John McEntire – music
