= OAO =

OAO, a three-letter acronym, may stand for:

- Orbiting Astronomical Observatory, the name of four NASA scientific satellites
- Open joint-stock company (Russian: Открытое Aкционерное Oбщество), a former type of business incorporation in Russia, Ukraine (VAT) etc.
- Odessey and Oracle, 1968 album by The Zombies
- Oddworld: Abe's Oddysee a platform game made by Oddworld Inhabitants released in 1997
- Over and Out (disambiguation), various meanings including the usual ending of transmissions in telecommunications
- Open-access operator, a British passenger rail company which does not hold a franchise
