= Oil and vinegar =

Oil and vinegar may refer to:

- Salad dressing, which may contain mixes of oil and vinegar
  - French dressing, a term originally used for any oil-and-vinegar-based salad dressing
  - Vinaigrette, made by mixing an oil with something acidic such as vinegar or lemon juice
- Oil and Vinegar (film), a screenplay by John Hughes that was never produced

== See also ==
- Unbalanced oil and vinegar scheme, cryptographic scheme
