= Car Alarm (disambiguation) =

A car alarm is an electronic security device for vehicles

Car Alarm may also refer to:

- Car Alarm (album), 2008 album by The Sea and Cake
- "Car Alarm", 2007 TV series episode from Kim Possible
