= Dianogah =

American indie rock band

- Origin: Chicago, Illinois, U.S.
- Genres: Indie rock, post-rock, math rock, post-hardcore, experimental rock
- Years active: 1995–present
- Label: Southern Records
- Members: Kip McCabe; Jay Ryan; Jason Harvey
- Past members: Stephanie Morris

Dianogah (pronounced Dye-ah-NO-gah) is an American indie rock band formed in 1995, noted for their use of two bass guitars. Members include Kip McCabe, Jay Ryan, and Jason Harvey.

== History ==
Dianogah named their band after the garbage compactor monster (the Dianoga) in the 1977 film Star Wars Episode IV: A New Hope. The band's early influences included Slint and Seam.

Dianogah's debut album, As Seen from Above, was recorded by Steve Albini, who also produced their second full-length album, Battle Champions, which was released on May 29, 2000.

The group was one of about a half-dozen performers that contributed to the soundtrack for Reach the Rock. Producer John McEntire managed the recording of the soundtrack, and later worked with the band on their third album, Millions of Brazilians. This record, released on April 16, 2002, also featured Rachel Grimes (of Rachel's) and John Upchurch of The Coctails.

On January 15, 2000, the band joined M.O.T.O to serve as opening acts for the final show at the Lounge Ax, an event which had The Coctails reunite briefly to perform as headliners.

Between 2000 and 2007, the band toured Europe three times (in 2000, 2002, and 2004), and play around the midwest and east coast. In 2007, the band returned to the studio with producer John McEntire to record their fourth album, Qhnnnl. In 2008, the band released Qhnnnl and featured Stephanie Morris on some of the recorded tracks. She played keyboard and guitar live with band as well on their 2008 east coast summer tour, as well as a fall 2008 trip to Europe, and a spring 2009 trip to England for the All Tomorrow's Parties Festival.

On June 1, 2009, Stephanie Morris died suddenly. In a statement on the band's web page, Morris had become an "integral part of our group, both musically and socially. Stephanie's passing took us all by surprise and has left a giant hole in the lives of many, especially her husband Nathan and her family." The band mentioned in the same note, they'd play a scheduled Pitchfork Music Fest set in July 2009 in her honor, but beyond that the band reported they were not sure what the future would hold for them.

Dianogah performed at the 2014 PRF BBQ in Chicago.

The band played two shows in 2017. Both were in their hometown of Chicago.

== Discography ==
=== Albums ===
- As Seen from Above (vinyl on Actionboy Records w/bonus 7", CD on OhioGold)
- Battle Champions CD/LP (Southern Records / 2000)
- Millions of Brazilians CD/LP (Southern Records / 2002)
- Qhnnnl CD/LP (Southern Records / 2008)

=== Singles ===
- "100% Tree" (Actionboy / 1995)
- "Garden Airplane Trap" (Actionboy / 1995)
- "Old Material New Format" CD/EP (originally released on Actionboy, reissued on My Pal God / 1996)
- "Dianogah"/"Log Letters" Split 7 (Hi-Ball / 1998)
- "Team Dianogah 2 Swedish" (Red Blue Yellow / 1998)
- "Hannibal"/"A Bear Explains" (Southern Records / 2001)

=== Compilations and soundtracks ===
- What Is Your Landmass? Ground Rule Double compilation CD,2xLP (Actionboy /Divot / 1995)
- Strongdar V/A Zum No. 2 comp (Zum / 1998)
- Bad Houses/Lone Tree Point V/A My Ohio Action Pal, Boy Gold God 300 (My Pal God, Actionboy, OhioGold / 1998)
- Dreams of Being King V/A Reach The Rock soundtrack (Hefty / 1999)
- Good One Buck V/A When the cat returns, the mice are fucked (Southern / 2005)
