= Nassau (album) =

Studio album by the Sea and Cake
- Released: March 27, 1995
- Recorded: 1994
- Studio: Idful, Chicago, Illinois
- Genre: Jazz-rock; indie rock
- Length: 46:34
- Label: Thrill Jockey
- Producer: John McEntire

The Sea and Cake chronology
The Sea and Cake (1994)	Nassau (1995)	The Biz (1995)

Professional ratings
Review scores
Source	Rating
AllMusic	4.5/5 stars
The Rolling Stone Album Guide	3/5 stars

Nassau is the second studio album by American indie rock band the Sea and Cake. It was released on March 27, 1995 by Thrill Jockey.

== Track listing ==
No.	Title	Length
1.	"Nature Boy"	5:03
2.	"Parasol"	5:30
3.	"A Man Who Never Sees a Pretty Girl That He Doesn't Love Her a Little"	3:02
4.	"The World Is Against You"	3:12
5.	"Lamonts Lament"	3:55
6.	"Soft and Sleep"	3:43
7.	"The Cantina"	4:48
8.	"Earth Star"	5:10
9.	"Alone, For the Moment"	4:44
10.	"I Will Hold the Tea Bag"	7:27

== Personnel ==
The Sea and Cake

- Sam Prokop — vocals, guitar
- Archer Prewitt — guitar, organ
- Eric Claridge — bass, piano
- John McEntire — percussion, EMS VCS3 synthesizer, organ, electric piano

Additional musicians

- Marnie Christensen — violin
- Poppy Brandes — cello
