= The Coctails =

American band

- Origin: Chicago
- Years active: 1988-1995

The Coctails were a musical group from Chicago, who formed while its members were attending the Kansas City Art Institute.

The band was active from about 1988 to 1995, with reunions in 2000 as the last band to play on stage at Lounge Ax before the famous Chicago club closed its doors; December 2004; January 2005 for the release of their Popcorn Box CD collection of rarities; and July 2005 for a tour of Japan.

== Members ==
Members Archer Prewitt, Mark Greenberg, John Upchurch, and Barry Phipps were largely self-taught musicians who experimented with various instruments and played in a manner they described as the Chinese fire drill method, in which they rotated instruments during live sets. For example, though Phipps often played bass, he was as likely to play guitar, drums, bass, saxophone, or theremin.

Originally considered a loungecore band because of their name and because they covered some Martin Denny tunes, they considered themselves a garage jazz band. Unfortunately, when the lounge/easy listening revival bubbled up after the first Esquivel CD reissue in 1994, the Coctails—because of their name—were too-often presumed to be part of the trend. However, the foursome were always curious musical adventurers and eager for a challenge, and in their final years they explored avant-garde jazz and indie rock, so their stylistic changes weren't entirely due to being pigeonholed as musical lounge lizards.

The four group members were also visual artists, and using a printshop which was installed in their loft created their own Coctails' line of merchandise, including buttons, calendars, t-shirts, newsletters, and similar music giveaways. They even created their own line of stuffed dolls in the likeness of each band member. Later a line of 12-inch action figures of the band were produced in Japan by Presspop Gallery as well as a book of the art of the Coctails' flyers. At some point during a Coctails show, the audience would be served popcorn in bags (and sometimes boxes) imprinted with the band's images.

The band created their own vinyl only record label called Hi-Ball Records. In addition to issuing their own records, they released records by the Vandermark Quartet (featuring Ken Vandermark), Masters Of The Obvious, Dame Darcy, Evergreen (featuring Britt Walford of Slint), Log Letters (featuring Mark Greenberg from the Coctails), Dianogah (featuring well known poster artist Jay Ryan (artist)), Dump (band) (a side band by James McNew of Yo La Tengo), and Brokeback (band) (a project of Douglas McCombs, bassist of Tortoise (band)).

== After the Coctails ==
Archer Prewitt currently performs solo and also plays with the Sea and Cake and Sam Prekop and creates the comic book "Sof'Boy". Mark Greenberg currently performs with Archer Prewitt, Eleventh Dream Day, and Candy Gold, and runs his own music-for-use company called the Mayfair Workshop. John Upchurch has played with Rachel's, co-owned and operated FireProof Press, and was on staff at Columbia College, Chicago (retired 2018). Mark and John recently collaborated on a CD called John and Mark's Children's Record, available on Tight Ship Records. Barry Phipps owns and operates Tight Ship Records and is the author of two photography trade books: Between Gravity and What Cheer: Iowa Photographs and Driving a Table Down, both from the University of Iowa Press.

In 2010, the band got back together to record Erik Satie's "Gymnopédie No. 1" for American Laundromat Records charity CD "Sing Me To Sleep - Indie Lullabies" which releases worldwide on May 18, 2010.

== Discography ==
The Coctails albums and 45s included:

- Hip Hip Hooray! LP (Hi-Ball)
- Here Now Today LP (Hi-Ball)
- The Early Hi-Ball Years CD comp (Carrot Top Records)
- Long Sound LP (Hi-Ball/Carrot Top Records)
- Peel LP (Hi-Ball/Carrot Top Records)
- The Coctails LP (Carrot Top Records)
- Live at Lounge Ax CD (Carrot Top Records)
- Songs for Children EP (Hi-Ball)
- Devo Corporate Anthem split 7-inch with Chrome Cranks (Insipid, Australia)
- Wheels split 7-inch with Southern Culture on the Skids (Todd & Cheryl Records)
- Working Holiday split 7-inch with Codeine (band) (Simple Machines)
- Tardvark EP with Dame Darcy (Hi-Ball)
- Why? 7-inch single with T. Lance (Telstar)
- Powerhouse 7-inch single (SOL - Singles Only Label)
- Winter Wonderland EP (Hi-Ball)
- 3/4 Time EP (Hi-Ball)
- Hello CDEP (Hello CD of the Month Club)
- Let's Enjoy 10-inch EP (Presspop, Japan)
- Popcorn Box 3-CD box set (Carrot Top)
