= Laboratory specimen =

Biological specimen sampled from an organism's tissue, bodily fluid, or other materials

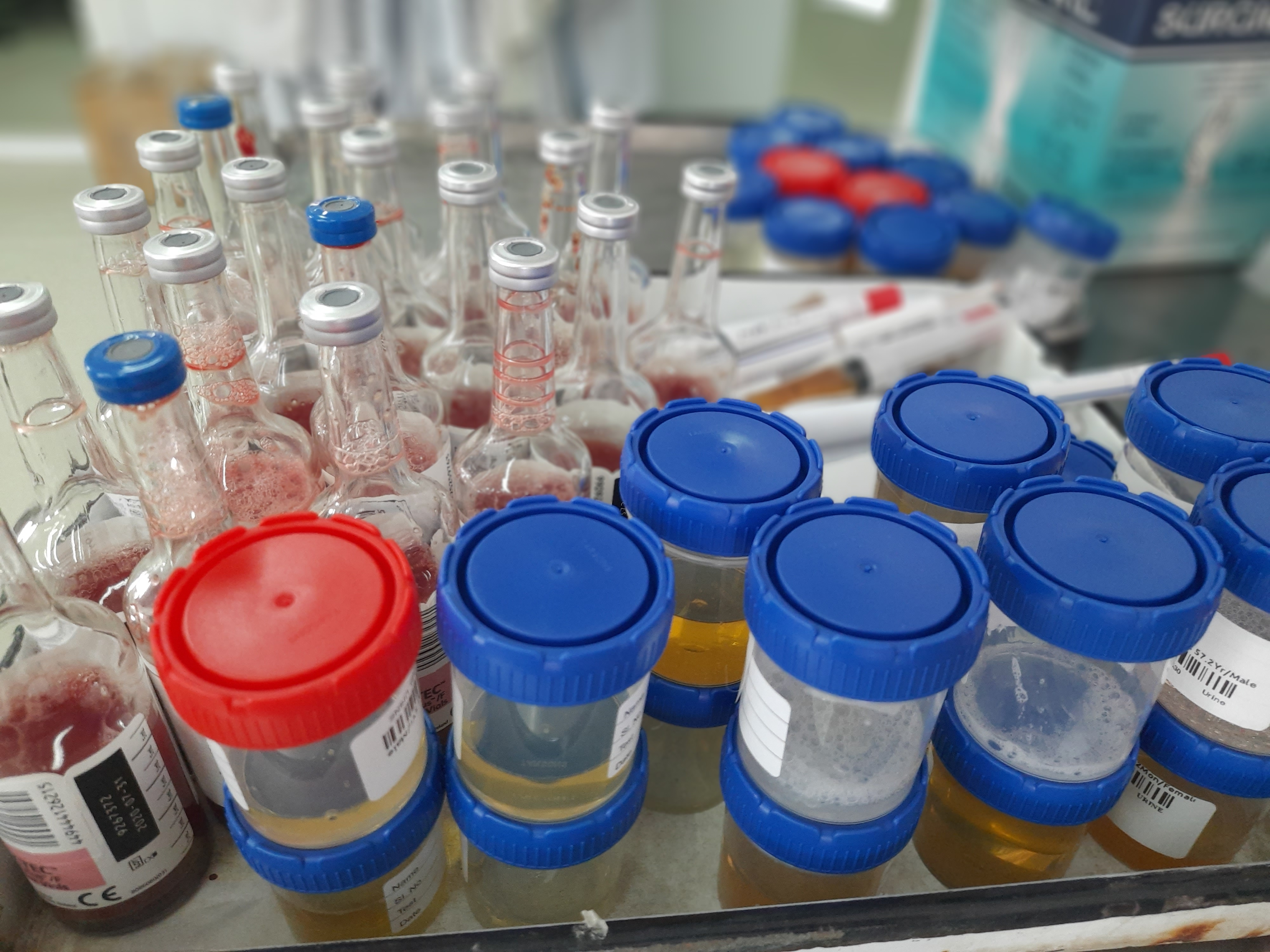
Variety of microbiological samples

A laboratory specimen is sometimes a biological specimen of a medical patient's tissue, fluids, or other samples used for laboratory analysis to assist in differential diagnosis or staging of a disease process. These specimens are often the most reliable method of diagnosis, depending on the ailment. For example, breast cancer biopsies, performed on laboratory specimens of breast tissue, yield just a 2% rate of incorrect diagnosis. Laboratory specimens may also include feces.

== Types ==
General types of cellular tissue extraction include:

- Bone marrow aspiration
- Cardiac tissue
- Core
- Endometrial biopsy
- Endoscopic biopsy
- Excisional and incisional
- Fine-needle aspiration
- Lymph node

== Preparation ==
For a given medical process, a certain volume of specimen must be taken from the patient. Some specimen types also require special treatment, such as immediate mixture with an additive, or storage at a certain temperature. After extraction, all specimen containers must be labeled with at least two of the following identifiers (at the time of collection): patient's name, date of birth, hospital number, test request form number, accession number, or a unique random number. All specimens should be labeled with the patient present. This ensures that no false results are obtained from mislabeled samples.

== Storage and use ==
Specimen temperatures are controlled for their specific use. Several common temperatures for storage are listed below:

Room temperature	10.1–40.0 °C (50.2–104.0 °F)
Refrigerated	1.0–10.0 °C (33.8–50.0 °F)
Frozen	−1.0 – −80.0 °C (30.2 – −112.0 °F)

Any specimen sample should only be used for testing, as any sharing of patient biological samples without patient consent is unethical and could heavily bias/slow research progress, not to mention grossly violate patient privacy.

== Disposal ==
Disposal varies based on the nature of the specimen and testing. Laboratory and healthcare personnel should follow industry standard practices regarding sterile technique and any precaution regarding hypodermic needles. All biological material should be treated as potentially hazardous and in doing so protocols regarding the disposal of the specimen should be strictly followed to maintain the safety of both patients and health care workers.
