= Two Gentlemen =

EP by the Sea and Cake
- Released: October 21, 1997
- Genre: Post rock
- Length: 26:55
- Label: Thrill Jockey
- Producer: Casey Rice

The Sea and Cake chronology
A Brief Historical Retrospective (1997)	Two Gentlemen (1997)	Oui (2000)

Professional ratings
Review scores
Source	Rating
AllMusic	2.5/5 stars

Two Gentlemen is a 1997 EP by the Sea and Cake.

== Track listing ==
1. "The Cheech Wizard Meets Baby Ultraman In The Cool Blue Cave (Short Stories About Birds, Trees And The Sports Life Wherever You Are)" – 5:48
2. "Rinky-Dink O.S. Type Rip" – 5:55
3. "I Took the Opportunity to Antique My End Table" – 7:28
4. "Early Chicago" – 4:38
5. "The Sewing Machine" – 3:06
