= John Hughes =

American filmmaker (1950–2009)

- Hughes in 1992
- Born: Jonathan Wilden Hughes Jr. February 18, 1950; Lansing, Michigan, U.S.
- Died: August 6, 2009 (aged 59); New York City, U.S.
- Resting place: Lake Forest Cemetery, U.S.
- Other name: Edmond Dantès
- Occupations: Screenwriter; film producer; director; humorist
- Years active: 1970–2009
- Spouse: Nancy Ludwig (m. 1970)
- Children: 2

Jonathan Wilden Hughes Jr. (February 18, 1950 – August 6, 2009) was an American filmmaker, writer, and producer. He is best known for writing, directing, and producing the films Sixteen Candles (1984), The Breakfast Club (1985), Weird Science (1985), Ferris Bueller's Day Off (1986), Planes, Trains and Automobiles (1987), and Uncle Buck (1989), in addition to writing the films Pretty in Pink (1986), National Lampoon's Christmas Vacation (1989), Home Alone (1990), 101 Dalmatians (1996), and Flubber (1997).

Widely considered an icon of the 1980s whose coming-of-age stories captured the teenage experience, Hughes set most of his films in Chicago, where he spent his teenage years. His work often combined slapstick comedy with heartfelt moments.

== Early life ==
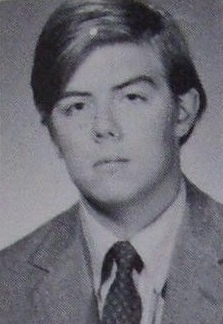
Hughes at Glenbrook North High School, 1967

John Wilden Hughes Jr. was born in Lansing, Michigan, on February 18, 1950, the son of charity volunteer Marion (née Crawford) and salesman John Wilden Hughes Sr. He had three sisters. He spent the first 12 years of his life in Grosse Pointe, Michigan, where he became a fan of Detroit Red Wings player Gordie Howe, who would later send Hughes one of his own jerseys, which was worn by Alan Ruck's character in Hughes's film Ferris Bueller's Day Off (1986).

Hughes described himself as a quiet child:

I grew up in a neighborhood that was mostly girls and old people. There weren't any boys my age, so I spent a lot of time by myself, imagining things. And every time we would get established somewhere, we would move. Life just started to get good in seventh grade, and then we moved to Chicago. I ended up in a really big high school, and I didn't know anybody. But then the Beatles came along and changed my whole life. And then Bob Dylan's Bringing It All Back Home came out and really changed me. Thursday I was one person, and Friday I was another. My heroes were Dylan, John Lennon, and Picasso, because they each moved their particular medium forward, and when they got to the point where they were comfortable, they always moved on.

In 1963, Hughes's family moved to the Chicago suburb of Northbrook, Illinois, where his father sold roofing materials. Hughes attended Grove Middle School and then Glenbrook North High School, which gave him inspiration for his most famous films. He also met Nancy Ludwig, a cheerleader and his future wife, at the school. As a teenager, Hughes turned to films as an escape. According to his childhood friend Jackson Peterson, "His mom and dad criticized him a lot [...] [Marion] would be critical of what John would want to do." Hughes was a fan of the Beatles, and allegedly knew a lot about films and the Rat Pack.

== Career ==
After dropping out of the University of Arizona, Hughes began selling jokes to well-established performers such as Rodney Dangerfield and Joan Rivers. He used his jokes to get an entry-level job at Needham, Harper & Steers as an advertising copywriter in Chicago in 1970, and later at Leo Burnett Worldwide in 1974. During this period, he created what became the famous Edge "Credit Card Shaving Test" ad campaign.

Hughes's work on the Virginia Slims account frequently took him to the Philip Morris headquarters in New York City, which allowed him to visit the offices of National Lampoon magazine. Soon after, he became a regular contributor to the magazine. Editor P. J. O'Rourke recalled that he "wrote so fast and so well that it was hard for a monthly magazine to keep up with him". One of Hughes's first stories, inspired by his family trips as a child, was "Vacation '58". This later became the basis for the film National Lampoon's Vacation. Among his other contributions, the April Fools' Day stories "My Penis" and "My Vagina" gave an early indication of his knack for teenage slang and understanding of the various indignities of teenage life in general.

In 1982, Hughes's first credited screenplay, National Lampoon's Class Reunion, was written while he was still on staff at the magazine. The resulting film became the second disastrous attempt by the magazine to duplicate the runaway success of National Lampoon's Animal House. His next screenplay for them was National Lampoon's Vacation (1983), which became a major success. This, along with the popularity of his script for Mr. Mom that same year, earned him a three-film deal with Universal Pictures.

In 1984, Hughes's directorial debut, Sixteen Candles won almost unanimous praise; this was due partly to its more honest depiction of navigating adolescence and the social dynamics of high school life, in stark contrast to the Porky's-inspired comedies made of the time. It was his first in a string of popular films about teenage life set in or around high school, including The Breakfast Club (1985), Weird Science (1985), and Ferris Bueller's Day Off (1986), all of which he wrote and directed, and Pretty in Pink (1986) and Some Kind of Wonderful (1987), which he wrote and produced.

To avoid being pigeonholed as a maker of only teen movies, Hughes branched out by writing, directing, and producing the hit comedy Planes, Trains and Automobiles (1987) starring Steve Martin and John Candy. His later output was not so well received critically, with films like Dutch (1991) performing poorly at the box office. Films like Uncle Buck (1989) and National Lampoon's Christmas Vacation (1989) proved massively popular. His final film as a director was Curly Sue (1991). By that time, his production company John Hughes Entertainment had signed deals with 20th Century Fox and Warner Bros.

Candy had many memorable roles in films written, directed, and/or produced by Hughes, including National Lampoon's Vacation (1983), Planes, Trains and Automobiles (1987), The Great Outdoors (1988), Uncle Buck (1989), Home Alone (1990), Career Opportunities (1991), and Only the Lonely (1991). Over the years, the two developed a close friendship. Hughes was greatly shaken by Candy's sudden death from a heart attack in 1994, with Hughes's friend Vince Vaughn later saying that he believed "if Candy had lived longer [then] John would have made more films as a director".

Hughes's greatest commercial success came with Home Alone (1990), a film he wrote and produced about a child accidentally left behind when his family goes away for Christmas, forcing him to protect himself and his house from a pair of inept thieves. Hughes completed the first draft of Home Alone in just nine days. Home Alone was the top-grossing film of 1990, and remains the most successful live-action family comedy of all time. He wrote and produced the sequels Home Alone 2: Lost in New York (1992) and Home Alone 3 (1997). Some of the subsequent films he wrote and produced during this time contained elements of the Home Alone formula, including the successful Dennis the Menace (1993) and the box office flop Baby's Day Out (1994). He also wrote screenplays under the pseudonym Edmond Dantes, sometimes spelled Dantès, after the protagonist of The Count of Monte Cristo, including Beethoven (1992), Maid in Manhattan (2002), Drillbit Taylor (2008).

In 1994, Hughes left Hollywood and moved back to the Chicago area. In 1995, he and Ricardo Mestres, both of whom had production deals with Walt Disney Pictures, co-founded the short-lived production company Great Oaks Entertainment. Hughes worked in Chicago while Mestres remained in Los Angeles. The company produced the films Jack (1996), 101 Dalmatians (1996), and Flubber (1997). Hughes and Mestres ended their collaboration in 1997. 1998's Reach the Rock, which they produced, was credited as "a Gramercy Pictures release of a John Hughes and Ricardo Mestres production".

Hughes remained out of the public eye in his later years, except for recording an audio commentary for the 1999 DVD release of Ferris Bueller's Day Off and giving a few interviews that same year to promote the Reach the Rock soundtrack. The album was compiled by Hughes's son, John Hughes III, who released it on his own record label Hefty Records.

=== Unproduced screenplays ===
- National Lampoon's Jaws 3: People 0 – a parody sequel to the popular film series (1979)
- Motorheads vs. Sportos, also known as Just Like Romeo and Juliet or Suburban Westside Story
- The History of Ohio from the Beginning of Time to the End of the Universe, also known as National Lampoon's Dacron, Ohio (1980; with P. J. O'Rourke)
- The Joy of Sex: A Dirty Love Story (1982; some drafts with Dan Greenburg)
- Debs – a satire on Texas debutantes (1983; Aaron Spelling Productions)
- The New Kid (1986)
- Oil and Vinegar – a soon-to-be-married man and a hitchhiking girl end up talking about their lives during the length of the car ride (1987)
- Bartholomew Vs. Neff – a vehicle that would have starred Sylvester Stallone and John Candy as feuding neighbors (1991)
- Black Cat Bone: The Return of Huckleberry Finn (1991)
- The Nanny (1991)
- The Bugster (1991)
- Ball 'n' Chain (1991)
- Live-action Peanuts film – Warner Bros. acquired the film rights to make a live-action Charlie Brown film, with Hughes set to both produce and write (1993)
- The Pajama Game – planned Warner Bros. remake
- Damn Yankees – another planned Warner Bros. remake
- The Bee – a feature-length Disney film that actor Daniel Stern was attached to direct (1994)
- Tickets – about teens who wait overnight for free tickets to a farewell concert (1996)
- The Grigsbys Go Broke – about a wealthy family who loses their fortune, forcing them to move to the other side of the tracks (2003)

== Personal life ==
In 1970, at the age of 20, Hughes married his high school girlfriend Nancy Ludwig. They had two sons and remained together until his death in 2009; she died a decade later at the age of 68 on September 15, 2019.

On politics, Hughes's friend P. J. O'Rourke wrote:

I have no idea how, or if, John voted [...] John and I never bothered to talk much about our politics. What we did talk about was the 20th century's dominant scrambled egghead bien pensant buttinski parlor pinko righty-tighty lefty-loosey nutfudge notion that middle-class American culture was junk, that middle-class Americans were passive dimbulbs, that America itself was a flop and that America's suburbs were a living hell almost beyond the power of John Cheever's words to describe [...] we were becoming conservatives—in the most conservational sense. There were things that others before us had achieved and these were worth conserving [...] family was the most conservative thing about John. Walking across the family room in your stocking feet and stepping on a Lego (ouch!) was the fundamental building block of society.

== Death ==
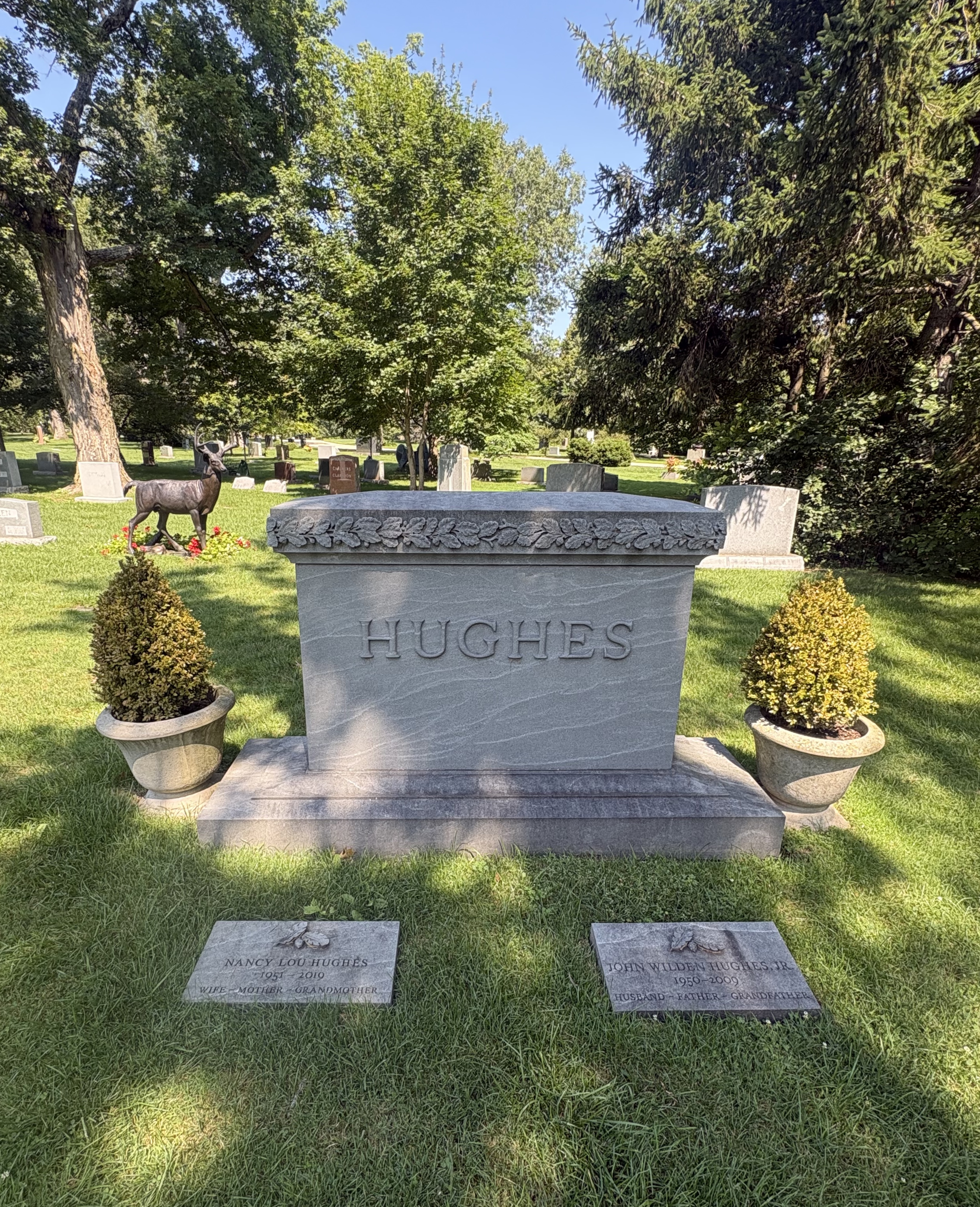
Hughes' grave at Lake Forest Cemetery

On August 5, 2009, Hughes and his wife Nancy traveled to New York City to visit their son James and their new grandson. James said Hughes appeared to be in good health that night, and that the family had made plans for the next day. On the morning of August 6, Hughes was taking a walk close to his hotel on West 55th Street in Manhattan when he suffered a heart attack. A bystander called an ambulance for him and he was rushed to Roosevelt Hospital, where he was pronounced dead at the age of 59.

Hughes was buried at Lake Forest Cemetery in Lake Forest, Illinois, following a private funeral service attended by family, friends, and collaborators such as Matthew Broderick and Vince Vaughn.

== Legacy ==
While primarily satirizing teen comedies from the 1990s, Not Another Teen Movie (2001) references a number of Hughes's films and is set at the fictional John Hughes High School. The 2009 pilot episode of the comedy series Community, which aired one month after Hughes died, was dedicated to him. The episode included several references to The Breakfast Club and ended with a cover of "Don't You (Forget About Me)", the original of which played over the end of The Breakfast Club.

The One Tree Hill episode titled "Don't You Forget About Me", which aired in February 2010, ended with a scene similar to the end of Sixteen Candles. It also contained references to Home Alone. At the end of the comedy film Easy A (2010), Emma Stone's character states that she wishes her life were a John Hughes movie and shows clips from Sixteen Candles, The Breakfast Club, and Ferris Bueller's Day Off. The 2011 Bob's Burgers episode "Sheesh! Cab, Bob?" paid homage to Sixteen Candles.

Following Hughes's death, many who knew him commented on the impact he had on their lives and the film industry. Molly Ringwald said, "I was stunned and incredibly sad to hear about the death of John Hughes. He was and will always be such an important part of my life. He will be missed—by me and by everyone that he has touched. My heart and all my thoughts are with his family now." Matthew Broderick said, "I am truly shocked and saddened by the news about my old friend John Hughes. He was a wonderful, very talented guy and my heart goes out to his family." The 2010 Academy Awards included a tribute to Hughes. Clips from his films were followed by his collaborators such as Ringwald, Broderick, Macaulay Culkin, Judd Nelson, Ally Sheedy, Anthony Michael Hall, and Jon Cryer gathering on stage to commemorate him and his contributions to the film industry.

Hughes's work has also influenced Generation X and Millennial filmmakers. He has been named as an influence by Jon M. Chu, Kelly Fremon Craig, and M. H. Murray.

Director Jon Watts took inspiration from films such as Ferris Bueller's Day Off for the style and tone of Spider-Man: Homecoming (2017). Hughes is referenced in the song "Hello Chicago" from 30 Seconds to the Decline of Planet Earth (2017), a collaborative album by the American band Sun Kil Moon and English band Jesu.

Sun Kil Moon frontman Mark Kozelek recalled a phone conversation over 20 years earlier, in which he had asked Hughes for $15,000 to help him finish and release Songs for a Blue Guitar (1996), an album by his then-band Red House Painters. Hughes agreed and told him, "You're young and on the rise, and I'm just an old man living in Chicago." The album was released by Hughes's own label Supreme Recordings. English band The 1975 have cited Hughes as an influence on their music. English singer Maisie Peters released a song called "John Hughes Movie" in 2021.

Molly Ringwald, who starred in several of Hughes' hits, said to a journalist while attending the 2026 Sundance Film Festival, that John Hughes "didn’t want his films remade" and that "I don’t think they should be".

== Works ==
=== Film ===
Year	Title	Director	Writer	Producer
1982	National Lampoon's Class Reunion	No	Yes	No
1983	Mr. Mom	No	Yes	No
1983	National Lampoon's Vacation	No	Yes	No
1983	Nate and Hayes	No	Yes	No
1984	Sixteen Candles	Yes	Yes	No
1985	The Breakfast Club	Yes	Yes	Yes
1985	National Lampoon's European Vacation	No	Yes	No
1985	Weird Science	Yes	Yes	No
1986	Pretty in Pink	No	Yes	Executive
1986	Ferris Bueller's Day Off	Yes	Yes	Yes
1987	Some Kind of Wonderful	No	Yes	Yes
1987	Planes, Trains and Automobiles	Yes	Yes	Yes
1988	She's Having a Baby	Yes	Yes	Yes
1988	The Great Outdoors	No	Yes	Executive
1989	Uncle Buck	Yes	Yes	Yes
1989	National Lampoon's Christmas Vacation	No	Yes	Yes
1990	Home Alone	No	Yes	Yes
1991	Career Opportunities	No	Yes	Yes
1991	Only the Lonely	No	No	Yes
1991	Dutch	No	Yes	Yes
1991	Curly Sue	Yes	Yes	Yes
1992	Beethoven	No	Yes	No
1992	Home Alone 2: Lost in New York	No	Yes	Yes
1993	Dennis the Menace	No	Yes	Yes
1994	Baby's Day Out	No	Yes	Yes
1994	Miracle on 34th Street	No	Yes	Yes
1994	Dumb and Dumber	No	Uncredited	No
1996	101 Dalmatians	No	Yes	Yes
1997	Flubber	No	Yes	Yes
1997	Home Alone 3	No	Yes	Yes
1998	Reach the Rock	No	Yes	Yes
2001	Just Visiting	No	Yes	No
2001	New Port South	No	No	Executive
2002	Maid in Manhattan	No	Story	No
2008	Drillbit Taylor	No	Story	No
2021	Home Sweet Home Alone	No	Story	No

=== Acting roles ===
Year	Title	Role	Note
1982	National Lampoon's Class Reunion	Girl with paper bag on head	Uncredited
1985	The Breakfast Club	Brian's dad	Uncredited
1986	Ferris Bueller's Day Off	Man running between cabs	Uncredited

=== Television ===
Writer

Year	Title	Note
1979	Delta House	5 episodes
1983	At Ease	Also creator and creative consultant for 1 episode
2000	American Adventure	Based on characters by Hughes

=== Television appearances ===
Year	Title	Note
1994	Hal Roach: Hollywood's King of Laughter	TV documentary
1995	Biography	To John with Love: A Tribute to John Candy
2001	E! True Hollywood Story	Sixteen Candles

=== Books ===
- National Lampoon Sunday Newspaper Parody (1978)

== See also ==
- Don't You Forget About Me
- Hughes Entertainment
- John Hughes's unrealized projects
- Shermer High School

== Bibliography ==
- Jaime Clarke ed. Don't You Forget About Me: Contemporary Writers on the Films of John Hughes. New York: Simon Spotlight Entertainment, 2007.
- Roberts, Soraya (July 5, 2016). "A Diamond and a Kiss: The Women of John Hughes". Hazlift.
