= Lake & Flames =

Studio album by The Car Is on Fire
- Released: 17 November 2006
- Recorded: 2006
- Genre: Alternative rock, New wave, Indie pop
- Label: Pomaton EMI
- Producer: Leszek Biolik

The Car Is on Fire chronology
The Car Is On Fire (2005)	Lake & Flames (2006)	Ombarrops! (2009)

Lake & Flames is the second album by Polish band The Car Is on Fire. It was produced by Leszek Biolik (Republika). It won the Fryderyk for Best Alternative Album of 2006 and was voted the best album of the year by listeners of Polish Radio 3 (as was its first single Can't Cook (Who Cares?)). The album features many string/horn arrangements, synths and vocal harmonies as opposed to the raw garage style of the group's debut album.

== Track listing ==
1. The Car Is On Fire Early Morning Internazionale
2. Can't Cook (Who Cares?)
3. Iran / China
4. Nexteam
5. Stockholm
6. Parker Posey
7. North By Northwest
8. Such A Lovely
9. When The Sun Goes Down
10. Seventeen
11. Ex Sex Is (Not) The Best (Title)
12. Neyorkewr
13. Oh, Joe
14. Take Me There
15. It's Finally Over
16. Kiss Kiss
17. Red Rocker
18. Falling Asleep And Waking Up
19. What Life's All About
20. Got Them CDs Babe, Thanks A Bunch
21. JW Construction
22. Love.
23. Lake & Flames
