= Qhnnnl =

Studio album by Dianogah
- Released: September 8th, 2008 (U.S.), August 25th, 2008 (U.K.)
- Studio: Soma Electronic Music Studios, Mayfair Recording Studios
- Genre: Rock, Post-Rock
- Label: Southern Records

Dianogah chronology
Millions of Brazilians (2002)	Qhnnnl (2008)

Professional ratings
Review scores
Source	Rating
Pitchfork Media	(7.4/10)

Qhnnnl (stylized as qhnnnl) is the fourth album by the American rock band Dianogah and was released on June 10, 2008.

== Track listing ==
All tracks are written by Dianogah.

No.	Title	Length
1.	"One One"	4:44
2.	"A Breaks B"	3:57
3.	"Qhnnnl"	2:53
4.	"Andrew Jackson"	4:20
5.	"Sprinter"	3:30
6.	"I Like Juice in a Shark Suit"	3:52
7.	"Es Possible Fuego?"	4:11
8.	"You Might Go Off"	2:15
9.	"Snowpants"	4:05
10.	"Puma"	2:29
11.	"Song You Hate"	1:43
12.	"Mongrel"	2:57
Total length:		41:16
