= John Hughes's unrealized projects =

Over the course of his career, American film director and writer John Hughes had worked on a number of projects which never progressed beyond the pre-production stage. Some of these productions fell into development hell or were canceled, while others he decidedly dropped himself.

== 1970s ==
=== National Lampoon's Jaws: 3, People: 0 ===
In 1979, Matty Simmons hired Hughes and Tod Carroll to write the script of the third Jaws film as a National Lampoon parody from Universal Pictures. According to Simmons, the film was to star Bo Derek and Richard Dreyfuss, and be directed by Joe Dante. Rodger Bumpass was also to appear in the film. However, Steven Spielberg, who directed the first film, managed to convince Universal not to make the film by threatening to never work with the studio again. Nevertheless, Simmons credits the unmade film as to how Hughes began his career in the film industry.

== 1980s ==
=== The History of Ohio from the Beginning of Time to the End of the Universe ===
In the early 1980s, Hughes and P. J. O'Rourke scripted an unproduced adaptation of National Lampoon Sunday Newspaper Parody which they titled The History of Ohio from the Beginning of Time to the End of the Universe. According to O'Rourke, "We never really got it to work and finally abandoned it. But it was fun to work together."

=== Patagonia ===
In July 1981, a screenplay called Patagonia was drafted by Hughes, based on a story he conceived with Harmon Berns. Kirk Honeycutt, author of John Hughes: A Life in Film, described it as an "Indiana Jones-style movie".

=== National Lampoon's The Joy of Sex: A Dirty Love Story ===
The Joy of Sex: A Dirty Love Story was initially set to be Penny Marshall's directorial debut and Hughes' first produced script, which consisted of several unrelated vignettes. However, as a result of the death of star John Belushi in 1982, Hughes' script was not used for the final film. It would eventually see release in 1983, titled Joy of Sex, but without the involvement of Marshall either.

=== Motorheads vs. Sportos ===
Also in 1982, Hughes scripted a comedy/romance reworking of Romeo and Juliet for Paramount Pictures, known variously under the titles Motorheads vs. Sportos, Just Like Romeo and Juliet, and Suburban Westside Story. The story is set in a Chicago high school and is about a romance that happens in the division between two feuding groups – the Motorheads and the Sportos. The idea later emerged in a speech by Edie McClurg in Ferris Bueller's Day Off (1986).

=== Dallas Debs ===
In 1983, Hughes wrote a script titled Dallas Debs, a satire on Texas debutantes, which was due to enter production in spring 1984 through Aaron Spelling Productions, but nothing came of it.

=== G.I. Jones ===
Following his first two screenwriting successes with Vacation and Mr. Mom (both 1983), Hughes began to churn out scripts and treatments faster than most of his Hollywood contemporaries. Among the ones which did not go beyond a first draft was G.I. Jones, a musical-comedy about a young kid in the Army, peeling potatoes in the kitchen, who falls in love with the general's daughter.

=== Spy vs. Spy ===
Another project Hughes scripted in the wake of Vacation and Mr. Mom was the espionage comedy, Spy vs. Spy. This too failed to develop into further drafts.

=== Fallen Angel ===
In June 1984, Hughes finished the first draft of an original screenplay titled Fallen Angel. It is unclear whether Hughes had intended on directing the project as well.

=== The New Kid ===
During the 1980s, Hughes wrote a script titled The New Kid, and it was based on his experiences growing up. According to Kirk Honeycutt, the story was "about a teenager's experiences in a new high school in Arizona." When Hughes offered Howard Deutch the choice to direct either The New Kid or Pretty in Pink (1986), Deutch chose to direct the latter film.

=== The Last Good Year ===
Anthony Michael Hall claimed that during the making of The Breakfast Club (1985), Hughes had an idea for a film which he titled The Last Good Year:

At one point when we were doing The Breakfast Club, John had an idea for a movie called The Last Good Year. It was something that he pitched to me as something he wanted to do with me, about the last good year being 1962, before the Beatles invasion. Maybe it was a sarcastic title. The idea was, I think, that the cultural shift was significant to him—the crossover in time from Pat Boone America to Beatles America. He didn't have too many of the story elements worked out, but, man, did he have a mix tape put together.

=== Lovecats ===
Molly Ringwald claimed that after he finished The Breakfast Club (1985), Hughes had written a script based on the song "The Love Cats" by The Cure.

=== Oil and Vinegar ===
After he finished Pretty in Pink (1986), Hughes wrote the script of a film titled Oil and Vinegar, which was to star Matthew Broderick and Molly Ringwald. According to Inquisitr, Broderick and Ringwald were to portray a couple who "spend a day in a motel room, swapping stories on life and love." According to Broderick, "It was very intimate: it was just the two of them, basically, is my memory, often in a car. It was a very typical romantic comedy about two very different people who fell in love, but it was very inventive in its smallness."

The film was to have been released by Universal Pictures, but Hughes objected when the studio asked for rewrites. Therefore, the creative differences between Hughes and Universal, along with Broderick and Ringwald's scheduling conflicts, are credited for why the film was never made.

== 1990s ==
=== Untitled John Candy vehicle ===
After working together on Uncle Buck (1989), Hughes and John Candy had pitched and/or discussed countless film ideas between themselves throughout the 1990s. Of these many proposed future collaborations, Kirk Honeycutt wrote:

The problem was always that of translating those late-night conversations [...] into concrete reality. "Candy once said to me, 'The suits in the high towers will just sap every bit of energy and fun out of a project,'" said [Robert David] Crane. "John Hughes with all his success was going through similar struggles. You get those raw ideas. Then in come the deal-makers, attorneys, studio heads, publicity department, and it all changes from that raw, fun meeting or phone call as it starts to be 'developed.'"

At the time of Candy's death in 1994, Hughes said that his dream had been to direct a star vehicle for Candy without a script—"just a cameraman, a box of film, coffee, and Teamsters." He added, "He is the only guy who could ever do that."

=== Bartholomew vs. Neff ===
In 1990, it was reported that Hughes would direct Sylvester Stallone and John Candy in a comedy he had written titled Bartholomew vs. Neff for Carolco Pictures. The film was to have been about feuding neighbors. Hughes had planned to direct the film right after he finished Curly Sue (1991). According to the Los Angeles Times, principal photography was scheduled to take place in the suburbs of Chicago during the summer of 1991. The film was never made.

=== The Nanny ===
Announced in February 1991 as part of 20th Century Fox's upcoming slate under chairperson Joe Roth, The Nanny was one of three original new Hughes films expected to move into production. It was likely shelved later that same year, presumably after the poor box office performance of Fox's Dutch (1991).

=== The Bugster ===
Also listed in the same 1991 lineup, The Bugster never advanced beyond its first mention. As with The Nanny, no additional information for the film was made known.

=== Ball 'n' Chain ===
A third Hughes title announced during Fox's 1991 Showest presentation, Ball 'n' Chain similarly vanished from development after the initial greenlight. Its cancellation, like the other two projects, may have reflected a shift in the studio's confidence in Hughes following his string of less commercially-successful films.

=== Black Cat Bone: The Return of Huckleberry Finn ===
In November 1991, it was reported that Hughes would write, produce and direct Black Cat Bone: The Return of Huckleberry Finn for 20th Century Fox. It was to have been about the character that was created by Mark Twain but be set in modern times. Principal photography for that film was scheduled to begin on March 16, 1992. However, it was reported that Hughes was competing against TriStar Pictures and Walt Disney Pictures, since both studios were also trying to make a Huckleberry Finn movie. Disney eventually succeeded over Fox and TriStar following the completion of The Adventures of Huck Finn (1993).

=== The Wizard of Id ===
At the same time Hughes signed on to write and supervise Warner Bros.' live-action version of Hank Ketcham's Dennis the Menace, he was additionally mulling a film version of Johnny Hart's comic strip Wizard of Id, which never came to pass.

=== Dennis the Menace II ===
In September 1992, before the release of Dennis the Menace (1993), star Walter Matthau revealed that he was already signed to reprise his role as Mr. Wilson in a sequel. In February 1993, Hughes told Variety that he would return to write the sequel only on the condition of Matthau returning to play Wilson. By 1996, it was reported that Dennis the Menace II was still being developed for Matthau, with the possibility of production starting after Grumpiest Old Men. A standalone sequel, Dennis the Menace Strikes Again was instead produced in 1998 but without the involvement of Hughes or Matthau.

=== The Pajama Game remake ===
Variety reported in October 1992 that Hughes and Warner Bros. were to do a remake of the 1957 film The Pajama Game.

=== Peanuts ===
After four hand-drawn animated movies made by Cinema Center Films and Paramount Pictures, in November 1992, it was reported that Hughes would write and produce a live-action adaptation of Charles M. Schulz's Peanuts for Warner Bros. Hughes reportedly visited Schulz at his home in Santa Clara, California to talk about adapting Peanuts into a film. According to Variety, Hughes planned to start writing the script on Christmas of 1992 and finish it by the spring of 1993, Hughes also verified that he would not direct the film. It is believed that the critical failure of Dennis the Menace (1993), which Hughes wrote and produced for WB, is what prevented the movie from being made. A CGI film was finally released in 2015 by Blue Sky Studios and 20th Century Fox Animation, now owned by Disney.

=== Damn Yankees remake ===
In 1993, Hughes reportedly wrote a script adapted from the musical Damn Yankees, but it never came to fruition.

=== The Bee ===
Due to the commercial success of Home Alone (1990), Hughes felt determined to make The Bee, a live action family comedy film that he wrote that required a $50 million budget. According to Daniel Stern, The Bee is about "an architect who was trying to finish his project that day and a bee comes into the house and the guy gets distracted by the bee. And the entire movie is the bee forcing the guy to destroy his own house and take his life apart." Author Kirk Honeycutt claimed that The Bee was inspired by Hughes' "involvement in the development of Redwing Farms, where he worked to reforest the land and turn it into a proper English farm." It is said that of Hughes script, only ten pages of it contained dialogue.

The Bee was initially developed at 20th Century Fox, but by early 1993, Hughes sold the project to Warner Bros. after Fox passed on it. Then in May 1994, WB put the project in turnaround. By June that same year, it was officially announced that Hughes would write, produce and direct The Bee for Walt Disney Pictures with a budget of $25 million. Simon Brew credits Hughes's 1994 departure from Hollywood, along with the critical and financial failure of Baby's Day Out (1994), which he wrote and produced for Fox, as factors that led to the film's cancellation.

In later reports, Daniel Stern claimed that he was going to direct the film. According to Stern, Hughes visited him on the set of Home Alone 2: Lost in New York (1992), showed him the script of The Bee and asked him to direct it. Stern further claimed that he worked on the script with Hughes. It has also been reported that Steve Martin was considered to star in the film; and, later, Jackie Chan.

=== Ski Nuts ===
According to Hughes biographer Kirk Honeycutt, Hughes had originated the story for the 1994 comedy Dumb and Dumber, and had even written an incomplete screenplay draft before eventually deciding to sell it to the Farrelly brothers and requesting the removal of his name. The Farrellys later recalled that Hughes' version was entitled Ski Nuts and centered around two dumb guys in Aspen:

The idea came from John Hughes. [...] That's all he had. Our agent asked if we wanted to work with him. We pitched the first act of Dumb and Dumber and he literally fell off his chair laughing. "This is it," he said. "And you're directing it." We wrote the script in three weeks but the studio didn't get back to us. Then John left Universal so the project just sat there for a couple of years until I wrote to John asking if he could ask Universal to give us the rights back. He did but said we could never use his name when selling it. If we did, it was a million-dollar fine. When promoting the movie, we wanted to say it was John Hughes's idea but we didn't have a million dollars. Now, though, we finally thought we'd tell. We think he'd be happy for people to know the truth.

=== Peter Pan ===
In 1995, it was announced that Hughes was set to write, produce and direct a live action Peter Pan film as a joint venture between The Walt Disney Company and TriStar Pictures.

=== Tickets ===
In 1996, Hughes had written a script titled Tickets that followed a group of teenage strangers camped out all night in zero degree weather for tickets to their favorite band's farewell show. According to Vulture, the script was never made into a film due to the release of the similarly themed film Detroit Rock City (1999). It was also known under the title Big Ticket.

=== How the Grinch Stole Christmas ===
In 1998, Hughes pitched a film version of How the Grinch Stole Christmas! to various studios before it was adapted into the 2000 live-action film.

=== Untitled history of Shermer, IL book ===
While discussing Reach the Rock (1998) during an interview with William Ham, Hughes mentioned that he had always wanted to write a visual history of the fictional town "Shermer, Illinois", which he'd used as a setting in many past films. "The whole notion of Shermer came out of that heterogeneous kind of society," he said, adding that he wanted to produce a book "because it'd be kind of the history of postwar America. Haven't got around to it yet, though."

=== Family Affair ===
In 1999, Variety reported that Hughes was working on a bigscreen version of TV's Family Affair for Warner Bros., alongside series producers Sid and Marty Krofft. Newcomer Emily Fox was to write the screenplay, and the project was to re-team Hughes with old collaborator Howard Deutch, who was slated to direct.

== 2000s ==
=== The Chambermaid ===
Hughes was the initial director of the romantic comedy Maid in Manhattan (2002), a modern retelling of Cinderella then under the title The Chambermaid, with Hilary Swank at that time set to star as the lead. However, by 2001, it was reported that Jennifer Lopez had replaced Swank and that Hughes would no longer be directing the film, opting to produce instead. He would later use a pseudonym on the final film as a result of excessive rewrites which changed his initial screenplay story.

=== The Grigsbys Go Broke ===
In 2002, Hughes had written a script titled The Grigsbys Go Broke, which was about a wealthy family in Chicago who lose all of their money and are forced to move to the other side of the tracks. It was later reported in 2010 that Paramount Pictures bought the rights to the script. However, the studio officially confirmed that it was not negotiated to purchase the script. In 2013, the project was back in development at Paramount, and it was revealed that Ice Age: The Meltdown screenwriter Jim Hecht would rewrite the script. But, again, the film was left in development hell.

=== The Breakfast Club sequel ===
In 2005, Emilio Estevez was reported to have signed on to appear in a sequel to The Breakfast Club (1985), with Hughes being involved as a writer:

John's got an idea for a sequel – mature aged students at college, all doing time again, for some reason or another. The twist would be that we're all the polar opposites of how we were in the original.

=== The Perks of Being a Wallflower ===
There was an online rumor that at one point, Hughes was going to write and direct an adaptation of the 1999 novel by Stephen Chbosky. It was said that Shia LaBeouf, Kirsten Dunst and Patrick Fugit were set to play Charlie, Sam and Patrick respectively. The film was also said to have a dark comedic tone. However, Hughes never completed a screenplay before his death nor it was confirmed that he was at one point making it before his death. The novel however was adapted and released in 2012 with Logan Lerman, Emma Watson and Ezra Miller playing the roles of Charlie, Sam and Patrick. The film was written and directed by the novel's author Stephen Chbosky.

=== Unpublished prose and other writings ===
Throughout the 2000s, though Hughes had stepped away from the film industry, he continued to write prolifically. According to his younger son, James, he remained a disciplined writer until the end of his life, producing "hundreds and hundreds of short stories" as part of an ongoing effort to develop his prose style. Some of these stories were autobiographical in nature, centered on his Grosse Pointe, Michigan childhood and narrated by a fictionalized version of himself, written under the pseudonym J. L. Hudson—a reference to the Detroit department store. These semi-fictional accounts echoed the narrative voice of his early story, "Vacation '58", which was told from the perspective of a child.

Hughes also maintained a constant practice of recording thoughts, vignettes, and observations in a growing collection of small pocket notebooks. According to Vanity Fair, Hughes carried them everywhere, filling them with "observations, incidents, editorials, inventories, theories, vignettes, overheard conversations", and occasional caricature-style drawings. Over 300 such notebooks have been found, along with computer files, personal journals, and binders of unpublished material. Much of this writing—ranging from short fiction to memoir—was never intended for publication. As his older son, John III, explained, Hughes was "comfortable with it never going anywhere."
