= Toast (Tar album) =

Studio album by Tar
- Released: August 25, 1993
- Recorded: April 1993
- Studio: CRC Chicago, IL
- Genre: Post-hardcore, noise rock
- Length: 47:22
- Label: Touch and Go

Tar chronology
Clincher (1993)	Toast (1993)	Over and Out (1995)

Toast is a studio album by American post-hardcore band Tar, released in 1993 through Touch and Go Records.

== Music ==
According to Stephen Howell of AllMusic: "Tar has one formula that they stick to, and that is to play very loud power chords, not using more than four or five of them in a single song."

== Critical reception ==
Professional ratings
Review scores
Source	Rating
AllMusic	2.5/5 stars

AllMusic staff writer Stephen Howell named "Mach Song" and the hidden track "The French Horn" as the album's highlights. He said: "Unfortunately, after roughly three tracks, everything on this album begins to sound very generic and stale. On top of this, vocalist/guitarist John Mohr sounds like a tone-deaf musician who's been on a bender for several days whenever he opens his mouth."

== Track listing ==
All tracks are written by Tar.

No.	Title	Length
1.	"Altoids, Anyone?"	2:45
2.	"Barry White"	3:44
3.	"Quitter Fellow"	4:04
4.	"Satritis"	3:29
5.	"Clincher"	3:45
6.	"Giblets"	3:58
7.	"Testor's Choice"	3:37
8.	"Standpipe"	2:44
9.	"Mach Song"	3:40
10.	"Theme (Includes hidden track "The French Horn")"	15:29

== Personnel ==
Performers

- John Mohr – guitar, vocals
- Mark Zablocki – guitar
- Tom Zaluckyj – bass
- Mike Greenlees – drums

Production

- Bob Hanson – photography
- David Lounsbury – recording for "The French Horn"
