= The Car Is on Fire (album) =

Studio album by The Car Is on Fire
- Released: May 21, 2005
- Recorded: June 2004
- Genre: indie rock
- Label: Pomaton EMI
- Producer: TCIOF & Michał Baczuń

The Car Is on Fire chronology
The Car Is on Fire (2005)	Lake & Flames (2006)

The Car Is on Fire is the self-titled debut album by Polish rock band The Car Is on Fire. It was released on May 21, 2005 through Pomaton EMI.

Percussion and guitars for this album, was recorded in June 2004, in KOSMOS studio (it was a studio before the first World War), in Warsaw. Vocals and additional effects was recorded also there and in the Adam Mickiewicz studio, in Sopot. Vocals in "Sexy" by Marta and Stefania from Kraków.

== Track listing ==
All tracks are written by The Car Is on Fire, except where noted

No.	Title	Length
1.	"No One Got Hurt, Fortunately"	2:27
2.	"Miniskirt"	3:23
3.	"Scarlett O'Hara"	3:29
4.	"Cranks"	3:22
5.	"Ellinor" (Contains an excerpt from a song by Klara Czubak)	2:36
6.	"At This Time"	1:31
7.	"(Escape, Escape)"	3:09
8.	"Miss Nevada"	2:22
9.	"Sexy Flawless Waitress Rules"	2:02
10.	"16 Days & 16 Nights"	2:29
11.	"Break Up with Him (The Break-Up Song)"	2:21
12.	"Sell Sell Sell"	3:41
13.	"Expect Some Hatred"	2:23

== Personnel ==
- Producer - TCIOF & Michał Baczuń
- Realisation - Michał Baczuń
- Mix - Jerzy Runowski, Michał Piwkowski
- Mastering - Grzegorz Piwkowski
- Additional producers - Maciej Cieślak
- Pictures: TCIOF - Sophie Thun, cat - Kuba Czubak, foot - Borys Dejnarowicz
- Cover design: TCIOF
