= Over and Out =

Over and Out may refer to:

== Albums ==
- Over and Out (Tar album)
- Over and Out (Rick Parfitt album)

== Songs ==
- "Over and Out", by 5 Seconds of Summer from their 2015 song (and EP) "She's Kinda Hot"
- "Over and Out", by Foo Fighters from their album In Your Honor
- "Over and Out", by Pantera from their 1988 album Power Metal
- "Over and Out", by We Are Scientists from their 2002 album Safety, Fun, and Learning (In That Order)
- "Over and Out", by Alkaline Trio from their 2008 album Agony & Irony
- "Over and Out", by Newton Faulkner from the 2008 album Rebuilt by Humans
- "Over and Out", by Westlife from the 2011 album Greatest Hits
- "Over & Out", by Lucyfire from their 2001 album This Dollar Saved My Life at Whitehorse
- "Over & Out", by Nuno Bettencourt from his album Mourning Widows
- "Over and Out", by Nine Inch Nails from the 2018 album Bad Witch

== Other ==
- The Over and Out Tour, a 2024-25 tour by Jeff Lynne's ELO
- Over and out, combined procedure words
