= Glass (EP) =

EP by The Sea and Cake

EP by the Sea and Cake
- Released: March 6, 2003
- Genre: Post rock
- Length: 45:20
- Label: Thrill Jockey

The Sea and Cake chronology
One Bedroom (2003)	Glass (2003)	Everybody (2007)

Professional ratings
Aggregate scores
Source	Rating
Metacritic	69/100
Review scores
Source	Rating
AllMusic	3/5 stars
Pitchfork	5.3/10

Glass is a 2003 EP by the Sea and Cake.

== Track listing ==
1. "To the Author" (version 1) – 5:28
2. "To the Author" (version 2) – 6:10
3. "Traditional Wax Coin" – 4:59
4. "An Echo In" – 4:30
5. "Tea and Cake" (mix by Stereolab) – 4:00
6. "Interiors" (Broadcast remix) – 3:21
7. "Hotel Tell" (C's mix) – 8:52
