= The Car Is on Fire =

Polish pop band

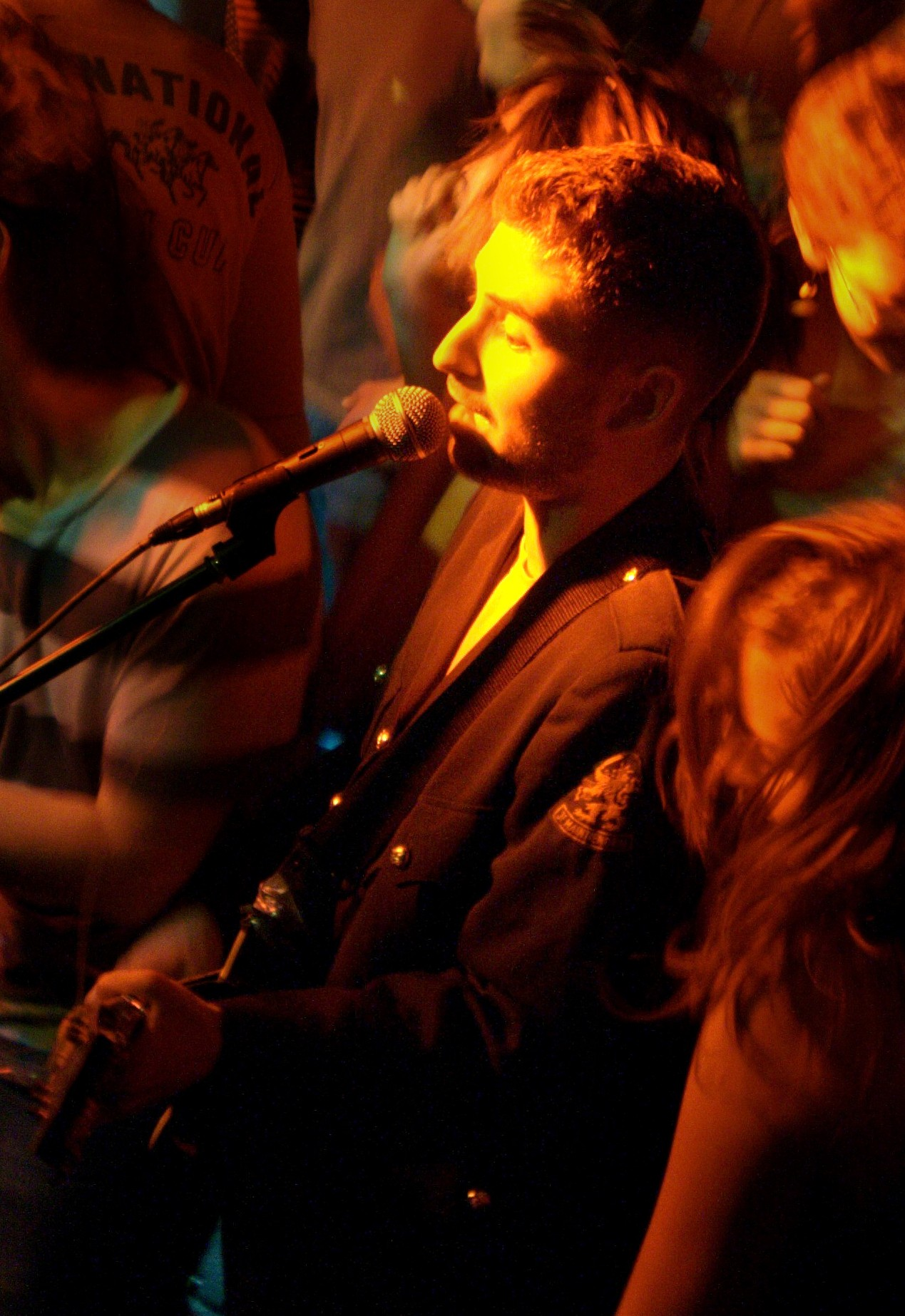
- Borys Dejnarowicz performing with The Car Is on Fire in 2007

Background information
- Origin: Poland
- Genres: Indie pop, alternative rock
- Years active: 2002–2013
- Labels: EMI, Thistime
- Past members: Kuba Czubak; Jacek Szabrański; Krzysztof Halicz; Borys Dejnarowicz; Michał Pruszkowski
- Website: thecarisonfire.com

The Car Is on Fire was a three-piece pop outfit from Warsaw, Poland. The band was formed in early 2002 and took its name from the first words on Godspeed You! Black Emperor's album F♯ A♯ ∞.

In May 2005 the debut, self-titled album was released. Its garage rock sound was balanced by melodies and angular rhythms. One year later, with the help of top polish producer Leszek Biolik and his studio team, the group recorded their second album, entitled Lake & Flames. Here, the music evolved into a much more eclectic hybrid of new wave energy, IDM beats, intimate acoustic balladry, string/horn arrangements and experimental psychedelia. It was met with nearly universal acclaim from the Polish media. The hype resulted in a number of awards, including the prestigious Fryderyk (the Polish equivalent of a Grammy) for the best alternative album of 2006. For the whole 2008 TCIOF was touring around Europe (they played at Glastonbury Festival). They've chosen John McEntire – legend of Chicago's alternative scene – for producing third album Ombarrops!, which premiered in 2009. The band's discography was lately released in Japan by Thistime Records and their popularity led to a 10-gig tour across the country.

In August 2013 members of the band officially announced its break-up both on official site and Facebook account.

== Band members ==
Former members

- Kuba Czubak – bass guitar, vocals (2002–2013)
- Jacek Szabrański – guitar, vocals (2002–2013)
- Krzysztof Halicz – drums, vocals (2002–2013)
- Borys Dejnarowicz – guitar, keyboards (2002–2007)
- Michał Pruszkowski – multi-instrumentalist(2007–2008)

== Discography ==
- The Car Is on Fire (2005)
- Lake & Flames (2006)
- Ombarrops! (2009)
