= Long Sound =

Studio album by the Coctails
- Released: 1993
- Studio: Acme
- Genres: Lounge rock, jazz
- Label: Hi-Ball/Carrot Top

The Coctails chronology
3/4 Time EP (1993)	Long Sound (1993)	Winter Wonderland (1993)

Long Sound is an album by the American band the Coctails. It was released in 1993, one of the many notable albums to come out of Chicago that year.

== Production ==
The band moved away from its earlier lounge sound by inviting reedman Ken Vandermark and saxophonist Hal Russell to help bring out more jazz elements. Dave Crawford, of Poi Dog Pondering, contributed on trumpet and flugelhorn. Many of the more guitar-centered tracks recorded during the sessions ended up on the band's next album, Peel.

== Critical reception ==
Professional ratings
Review scores
Source	Rating
AllMusic	4/5 stars
Robert Christgau	(dud)

Trouser Press wrote: "While hardly virtuosos, the Coctails play with low-key humor and create a series of soundscapes—by turns muted and buoyant, lush and fractured—that evoke heroes from Billy Strayhorn to Sun Ra." The Chicago Tribune called the album "a beautifully programmed series of jazzy soundscapes, with ringers like Ken Vandermark, Dave Crawford and Hal Russell—in the last recorded performance before his death—adding their distinctive voices."

The Pittsburgh Post-Gazette praised the "brooding, melancholic, jazzy feel," writing that the band "proved they were more than Blue Note wannabes by constructing a record any jazz aficionado would cite as a Top 10 pick." The Atlanta Journal-Constitution concluded: "Snaky and hypnotic, the tunes amble like a laid-back flip side to Eric Dolphy's classic, Out to Lunch." The Wisconsin State Journal noted that "the band made what it felt was a necessary foray into free-form jazz noodling, with longer songs and mixed results."

AllMusic wrote that "the quartet's sound moved more to jazz and away from the band's poppier efforts on albums like Early Hi-Ball Years." Pitchfork deemed it "a superb album of alternately weird and elegiac jazz."

== Track listing ==
No.	Title	Length
1.	"Steam"
2.	"China Song"
3.	"Monkeys and Seals"
4.	"Stray Horn"
5.	"Tenement"
6.	"Twilight for Henry"
7.	"Waterlogged"
8.	"Clown's Coffee"
9.	"Far East"
10.	"Gripper Bite"
