= As Seen from Above =

Studio album by Dianogah
- Released: 1997
- Genre: Indie rock
- Length: 36:27
- Label: Ohio Gold (CD); Actionboy Records (LP)
- Producer: Steve Albini

Dianogah chronology
As Seen from Above (1997)	Battle Champions (2000)

Professional ratings
Review scores
Source	Rating
AllMusic	4.5/5 stars

As Seen from Above is an album by the American band Dianogah, released in 1997.

== Critical reception ==
The Chicago Reader thought that the "trio’s surefooted maneuvers through intricate arrangements lead it down the path taken by guitar bands like the Minutemen, Slovenly, Slint, and Silkworm ... Dianogah’s revisitations aren’t half bad–but neither are they half as good as the originals."

AllMusic wrote that "Jason Harvey and Jay Ryan's dexterous bass work interweaves perfectly with Kip McCabe's precision drumming almost as if the three instruments were one."

== Track listing ==
All tracks are written by Dianogah.

No.	Title	Length
1.	"Plankton and Krill"	3:02
2.	"What Is Your Landmass"	2:54
3.	"Seeing Stars"	3:47
4.	"Broken Magnet Halves"	3:49
5.	"Colby"	3:40
6.	"Between the Ship and the Land"	5:29
7.	"Lone Tree Point"	3:02
8.	"Spiral Bound"	4:16
9.	"Shogun"	6:29
Total length:		36:28
