= Tar (band) =

American music group

- Origin: Chicago
- Genres: Noise rock, post-hardcore
- Years active: 1988–1995, 2012, 2017
- Labels: Touch and Go; Amphetamine Reptile; No Blow; Chunklet; Dischord; Glitterhouse
- Members: Mike Greenlees; John Mohr; Mark Zablocki; Tom Zaluckyj; Tim Mescher

Tar was an American post-hardcore band, formed in 1988 in Chicago. Throughout their career they released four full-length albums, two mini-albums, and a number of singles on two notable independent labels (Amphetamine Reptile Records and Touch and Go Records). The band broke up in 1995 but briefly reunited in 2012 and 2017.

== History ==
The precursor to Tar was a hardcore punk outfit called Blatant Dissent, which formed in DeKalb, Illinois where vocalist/guitarist John Mohr and drummer Mike Greenlees were attending Northern Illinois University. The final incarnation consisted of Mohr on vocals, Greenlees on drums, Tim Mescher on bass, and Bruce Halverson on guitars. After Halverson departed from the band, the remaining members decided to start fresh, and named themselves Tar with the addition of guitarist Mark Zablocki.

After releasing their debut single in 1988 ("Play to Win" on Mohr's novelty label No Blow Records), the band signed to Amphetamine Reptile Records and released the mini-album Handsome in 1989. Both Steve Albini and Iain Burgess served as engineers. Tar played various regional shows with bands such as Laughing Hyenas, Cheer-Accident, Cows, among others. The band released Roundhouse in 1990, which featured their first music video, "Les Paul Worries". In early 1991, Mescher departed from the band (although he briefly remained in the music industry to play in the band Snailboy), and he was replaced on bass by Tom Zaluckyj. Shortly after, Tar went on a European tour sponsored by Amphetamine Reptile. Helmet, Surgery, and God Bullies were on the tour as well. During their first week in Europe, Tar recorded four songs for a Peel Session at Maida Vale Studios. In late 1991, Tar released the album Jackson. By that point, Zaluckyj and Mohr played unique instruments, crafted of aluminum, designed by Ian Schneller of Specimen Products.

In 1992, Tar decided to switch record labels. They were initially approached by numerous major labels, such as Slash Records and MCA Records. The band however refused the major labels' offers, and opted to sign with the prominent independent label Touch and Go Records. The band released their debut for the label, Clincher, in early 1993. A few months later however, Tar quickly released the follow-up album Toast. Overall, Tar toured extensively throughout 1993, playing alongside bands such as Jawbox, Moving Targets, Hazel, Girls Against Boys, and Arcwelder. Also in 1993, Tar released a split single with Jawbox. It consisted of Tar covering the Jawbox song "Static" (originally from Novelty) and Jawbox covering the Tar song also titled "Static" (originally from Handsome).

After extensively touring throughout the previous few years, in early 1994, Tar decided to disband due to overall exhaustion; however, they opted to finish one final album. Originally, the band intended to complete the album in about nine months, but the process lasted more than a year. Tar's final album, Over and Out, was released in late 1995 via Touch and Go. Tar played their final live show on November 24, 1995. The Chicago venue Lounge Ax hosted the band.

Tar reunited for a one-off performance at the PRF BBQ 2012 festival in Chicago, and later in the year, as opening act for Shellac at Lincoln Hall in Chicago. In 2013, a double vinyl disc compilation titled 1988–1995 was released through Chunklet Magazine, limited to 150 gold-colored copies that included download cards. It consisted of b-sides, non-album tracks, and outtakes that previously did not appear on Tar's six main releases. The group would reunite again in 2017 to perform at the All Tomorrow's Impeachments festival. A box set was released in 2021 as well, titled Tar Box. It compiled the band's first three major releases (Handsome, Roundhouse, and Jackson) in addition to the band's final live show from 1995.

In 2021, Mohr and Greenlees formed the band Deep Tunnel Project. The band also included Tim Midyett of Silkworm and Jeff Dean of The Bomb. Their self-titled debut album was released through the label Comedy Minus One in 2024.

== Musical style and influences ==
Steve Huey of AllMusic described Tar's sound as "a fierce blend of abrasive noise rock and post-hardcore punk." According to him: "Tar's thick, heavy guitar textures and pitch-dark dissonance were an accurate reflection of their moniker, and their disdain for accessibility or major-label exposure was just as accurate a reflection of the scene from which they'd arisen." Music journalist Andrew Earles stated that Tar "served as a kind of poster band for the harder, aggro field of indie rock and post-hardcore while implementing its own idiosyncratic tocuhes to the subgenre." Earles described them as a "sort of smoothed-out Helmet with more of a focus on songwriting." The band frequently played down-stroked power chords and did not incorporate lead guitar. Tar also avoided guitar solos entirely. The vocals were melodic, and Earles described them as "understated". The band's early material drew influence from punk and hardcore acts such as Big Black, Naked Raygun, Sex Pistols, Stooges, and New York Dolls. Later releases by the band were compared to Helmet and The Jesus Lizard.

== Members ==
- John Mohr – vocals, guitars (1988–1995, 2012, 2017)
- Tom Zaluckyj – guitars, vocals (1988–1995, 2012, 2017)
- Mike Greenlees – drums (1988–1995, 2012, 2017)
- Mark Zablocki – bass (1991–1995, 2012, 2017)
- Tim Mescher – bass (1988–1991)

== Discography ==
=== Studio albums ===
- Handsome (1989, Amphetamine Reptile Records) (Note: Released as an EP.)
- Roundhouse (1990, Amphetamine Reptile Records/Glitterhouse Records)
- Jackson (1991, Amphetamine Reptile Records)
- Clincher (1993, Touch and Go Records)
- Toast (1993, Touch and Go Records)
- Over and Out (1995, Touch and Go Records)

=== Compilation albums ===
- 1988–1995 (2013, Chunklet Industries)
- Tar Box (2021, No Blow Records/Chunklet Industries)

=== Singles ===
- "Play to Win" (1988, No Blow Records)
- "Flow Plow" (1989, Amphetamine Reptile Records)
- "Solution 8" (1991, Amphetamine Reptile Records)
- "Static" (1992, Touch and Go Records/Dischord Records) (Note: Released as a split single with Jawbox.)
- "Teetering" (1992, Touch and Go Records)
- "Feel This" (2012, Chunklet Industries)
