= Any Day =

Studio album by the Sea and Cake
- Released: May 11, 2018
- Genres: Indie rock, post-rock, jazz rock
- Length: 38:05
- Label: Thrill Jockey

The Sea and Cake chronology
Runner (2012)	Any Day (2018)

Any Day is the eleventh studio album by the Sea and Cake, released on Thrill Jockey. It was their first album recorded as a trio, after long time bassist Eric Claridge left the band due primarily to carpal tunnel syndrome and arthritis.

== Critical reception ==
Professional ratings
Aggregate scores
Source	Rating
Metacritic	70/100
Review scores
Source	Rating
AllMusic	3.5/5 stars
The Guardian	3/5 stars
The Line of Best Fit	8/10
Pitchfork	7.5/10

Any Day received generally positive reviews from music critics.

No.	Title	Length
1.	"Cover the Mountain"	2:51
2.	"I Should Care"	3:17
3.	"Any Day"	4:53
4.	"Occurs"	4:32
5.	"Starling"	3:30
6.	"Paper Window"	3:22
7.	"Day Moon"	3:18
8.	"Into Rain"	3:53
9.	"Circle"	3:36
10.	"These Falling Arms"	4:53
