= Shrimp Boat =

American rock band

- Origin: Chicago, Illinois, U.S.
- Genres: Indie rock, alternative rock
- Years active: 1987–1993
- Labels: Bar/None, Rough Trade, Ajax, AUM Fidelity, Bomba
- Spinoffs: The Sea and Cake, Falstaff
- Members: Ian Schneller; Sam Prekop; David Kroll; Eric Claridge; Brad Wood
- Past members: Joe Vajarsky (non-official member); Tom Jasek (non-official member)

Shrimp Boat was an American rock band formed in Chicago, Illinois in 1987. After the band dissolved in 1993, Sam Prekop and Eric Claridge formed The Sea and Cake. Ian Schneller and Tom Jasek went on to form Falstaff. Schneller's experience with the band would also lead him to create Specimen Products.

== Members ==
- Eric Claridge (drums, bass)
- David Kroll (bass, banjo, tenor sax)
- Sam Prekop (vocals, guitar, bass)
- Ian Schneller (guitar, vocals, drums)
- Brad Wood (drums, soprano sax, keyboard)

=== Non-official members ===
- Joe Vajarsky (max sax)
- Tom Jasek (drums)

== Discography ==
- Some Biscuit (1988)
- Daylight Savings (1988)
- Speckly (1989)
- Volume One (1991)
- Duende (1992)
- Small Wonder EP (1993)
- Cavale (1993)
- Something Grand (2004)
