= Over and Out (Tar album) =

Studio album by Tar
- Released: September 19, 1995
- Recorded: May 1994 – April 1995 at Electrical Audio Recording, Chicago IL
- Genre: Noise rock
- Length: 42:39
- Label: Touch and Go Records
- Producer: Steve Albini

Tar chronology
Toast (1993)	Over and Out (1995)

Professional ratings
Review scores
Source	Rating
AllMusic	4/5 stars
MusicHound Rock: The Essential Album Guide	4/5 stars

Over and Out is the fourth and final studio album by American post-hardcore band Tar, released in 1995 through Touch and Go Records.

Two outtakes from the album were released by fanzine Chunklet in 2012.

== Critical reception ==
MusicHound Rock: The Essential Album Guide praised the album's "stripped down" sound and "new, menacing darkness." The Chicago Reader wrote that "Mark Zablocki and front man John Mohr lock their lean, meaty guitars together into unfussy dual riffs, simultaneously neat and jagged, that add an extra jolt of momentum to the precise, bulldozer-simple pounding of drummer Mike Greenlees." Trouser Press called the album Tar's "best and most varied," writing that "the emotional centerpiece is the tumultuous 'Building Taj Mahal', which ruminates on a band’s last stand: 'I am familiar with the concept of filler,' sings Mohr, but adds, 'This one is special.'"

== Track listing ==
All tracks are written by Tar

No.	Title	Length
1.	"Known Anomalies"	4:20
2.	"Welk"	3:28
3.	"Time To Strike"	3:37
4.	"Building Taj Mahal"	6:59
5.	"Q.V.C."	4:11
6.	"Billow My Sail"	2:48
7.	"Muncie"	4:41
8.	"Carpel Tunnel Season"	4:09
9.	"Topless, Mindless, Senseless"	4:05
10.	"The Shoo"	4:21

== Personnel ==
=== Performers ===
- John Mohr - vocals, electric guitar
- Mark Zablocki - electric guitar, e-bow
- Mike Greenlees - drum set
- Tom Zaluckyj - electric bass guitar, electric guitar, vocals
- Al Johnson - vocals on "Known Anomalies"

=== Production ===
- Bob Weston - Recording engineering
- Steve Albini - Recording engineering
