= Oui (album) =

Studio album by the Sea and Cake
- Released: October 3, 2000
- Genre: Indie; Post rock
- Length: 40:34
- Label: Thrill Jockey

The Sea and Cake chronology
The Fawn (1997)	Oui (2000)	One Bedroom (2003)

Professional ratings
Aggregate scores
Source	Rating
Metacritic	75/100
Review scores
Source	Rating
AllMusic	4/5 stars
Robert Christgau	(dud)
The Encyclopedia of Popular Music	4/5 stars
Pitchfork Media	9.0/10
Spin	5/10

Oui is the fifth album by the Sea and Cake, released on Thrill Jockey.

== Critical reception ==
Trouser Press called the album "lackluster," writing that it "adheres closely to the formula but fails to generate any sort of spark from it." The Chicago Tribune called it the band's "most delicately engrossing work, its charms illustrated in tiny moments of bliss such as the ghostly, Jobim-like fade of 'The Colony Room' or the lush yet fragile orchestrations of 'Seemingly'." SF Weekly deemed it "an unfortunate downtempo detour."

== Track listing ==
1. "Afternoon Speaker" – 4:18
2. "All the Photos" – 3:19
3. "You Beautiful Bastard" – 5:54
4. "The Colony Room" – 4:10
5. "The Leaf" – 4:24
6. "Everyday" – 3:01
7. "Two Dolphins" – 3:45
8. "Midtown" – 2:56
9. "Seemingly" – 4:46
10. "I Missed the Glance" – 4:01
