= Reach the Rock =

1998 film

- VHS cover
- Directed by: William Ryan
- Written by: John Hughes
- Produced by: John Hughes
- Starring: William Sadler; Alessandro Nivola; Bruce Norris; Brooke Langton
- Cinematography: John J. Campbell
- Edited by: Gerald B. Greenberg
- Music by: John McEntire
- Production company: Gramercy Pictures
- Distributed by: Universal Pictures
- Release date: October 16, 1998 (United States)
- Running time: 100 minutes
- Country: United States
- Language: English
- Box office: $4,960

Reach the Rock is a 1998 American comedy drama film directed by William Ryan and starring William Sadler and Alessandro Nivola, and was the final film to be written and produced by John Hughes.

Reach the Rock was released by Universal Pictures on October 16, 1998. The film received negative reviews from critics and grossed $4,960.

== Premise ==
A small-town troublemaker (Alessandro Nivola), directionless and alienated, ends up spending a night in a jail cell, where he and the police chief (William Sadler) engage in a battle of wills and wit.

== Cast ==
- William Sadler as Quinn
- Alessandro Nivola as Robin
- Bruce Norris as Ernie
- Brooke Langton as Lise
- Norman Reedus as Danny
- Karen Sillas as Donna
- Richard Hamilton as Ed

== Production ==
Writer/producer John Hughes came up with the premise for Reach the Rock basing the character of Robin off "base kids" and "farm kids" he knew in his youth displaced by the transition of "rural communities" to "bedroom communities" who while tough were also social outcasts among the wealthier residents of Chicago's North Shore. Hughes compared the character of Robin to John Bender from The Breakfast Club calling him the natural evolution of Bender had he stayed with Molly Ringwald's character, Claire, and never moved on.

After director Chris Columbus dropped out of directing National Lampoon's Christmas Vacation due to clashes with actor Chevy Chase, Hughes offered Columbus two other scripts he was working on as possible replacements. The two scripts in question were Reach the Rock and Home Alone with Columbus opting to direct the latter as he didn't respond to the former. In the early 90s, Hughes offered Reach the Rock to Patrick Read Johnson who had made his feature debut with Spaced Invaders. Johnson stated that he loved the script calling it "the most serious thing John had ever written, in my opinion" but due to the film being primarily a performance piece with no actions sequences or special effects Johnson passed on the film as he didn't feel confident he could do it justice. Johnson later expressed his disappointment with the final filmed version of Reach the Rock.

In May 1996, open casting for the film, under the title Reach for the Rock, had begun with the studio looking for two unknowns who could be "...the next Johnny Depp and the next Winona Ryder". In May 1997, it was reported that Alessandro Nivola had secured one of the leads.

William Ryan, an assistant working under Hughes, would be given the script by Hughes to direct and although Ryan never directed again he did go on to run Hughes Entertainment.

The soundtrack featured a compilation of Chicago-based post-rock artists, among them Tortoise and associated acts Bundy K. Brown, The Sea and Cake and John McEntire. It was released on Hefty Records, a label owned and operated by Hughes's son, John Hughes III. The film gets its title from a song by the band Havana 3am. Reach the Rock would mark the final writing credit for Hughes in which he was the sole author.

Filming took place in Chicago's Northwest Side as well as West Chicago from July through September 1996.

Richard Lightstone who worked on the film as a sound engineer stated the film was made out of contractual obligation to Universal Studios who per the stipulations of a contract with Hughes were owed a film made by him. Hughes only visited the set once and mainly left William Ryan in charge of the production.

== Release ==
Initially the film had been planned for a Spring 1998 release, but Universal Pictures ended up giving Reach the Rock an extremely limited theatrical run in the United States on October 16, 1998, where the film only played in three theaters in three cities for a one-week engagement grossing only $4,960. The film was given a home video release on July 27, 1999.

== Reception ==
The film received generally negative reviews. Review aggregator Rotten Tomatoes gave the film a score of 38% based on reviews from 8 critics, with an average rating of 4.5/10. Film critic Roger Ebert gave the film 1 out of 4 stars. He compared it negatively to Hughes' Planes, Trains and Automobiles, and complained that the movie was "very sad" and felt like it was playing "in slow motion."
