= Specimen Products =

- Type: Private
- Industry: Musical instruments
- Genre: Luthier
- Founded: 1984
- Founder: Ian Schneller
- Headquarters: Chicago, Illinois, USA
- Area served: Global
- Key people: Ian Schneller, Nadine Schneller
- Products: String instruments, tube amps
- Owner: Ian Schneller
- Subsidiaries: Chicago School of Guitar Making
- Website: Specimen Products.com

Specimen Products is a Chicago-based manufacturer of custom guitars, tube amplifiers, and audio horn speakers led by luthier Ian Schneller. Specimen Products also offers courses in guitar and tube amplifier design, construction, and repair through their Chicago School of Guitar Making. The Specimen workshop offers repair services to the general public, making use of their collection of parts from rare and vintage manufacturers.

== History ==
The brand Specimen Products was conceived by company founder Ian Schneller in 1981, during his undergraduate study at the Memphis College of Art. After completing his graduate studies at the School of the Art Institute of Chicago, Schneller began producing instruments in favor of sculpture. In 1986, as he began producing more instruments for friends and bandmates, Schneller established his workshop on Chicago's south-side Archer Street, in a loft rented by his band Shrimp Boat. The first commissioned project Specimen undertook was fulfilling Tar guitarist John Mohr's request for an "indestructible guitar," a task that would develop the company's longstanding experiments with aluminum guitars. The Archer Street facility was creatively productive but Schneller states that he only sold a single unit out of the many produced.

In 1992, Specimen was moved to Madison Street. It was at this facility that the company began to offer guitar and tube amplifier repair services. In the two years spent on Madison Street, Specimen introduced their first two standard models, the Pippin and the Maxwell. At this time Schneller began to experiment with mimicking the silhouette of established guitar models using non-traditional materials. This experiment would prove central to the philosophy behind Specimen's later designs. By 1994, Specimen was working to fulfill backlogged orders.

In 1994, Specimen moved to a storefront on Division Street in the Wicker Park neighborhood. At this point Specimen's plans for a production run of 10-Watt amps materialized in the Petimor amplifiers. The Division Street shop allowed for an expanded repair business. Repairing so many guitars from big manufacturers impressed upon Schneller the need for minimalist designs with very durable construction. These tenets have become the standard of Specimen Products designs. The Division Street shop became a prominent show room for the custom instruments, establishing a customer base with many local musicians, as well as those travelling through the area.

In 2003, the business grew large enough to warrant moving to a new facility on Chicago's near westside, representing a shift to an industrial model of production rather than a boutique. It is equipped with modern specialized equipment for finishing completed products as well as intensive design of new models. In 2005, this facility became the operating center for Schneller's Chicago School of Guitar Making.

== Products ==
Specimen Products offers a wide variety of products for sale from their showroom. The string instruments, tube amplifiers, and horn speakers produced by Specimen use experimental designs and materials, or seek to reinvent antique designs or concepts.

=== Instruments ===
The instruments produced by Specimen products have become highly regarded as both ornate works and quality sound. While Specimen continues to experiment with different materials and designs, most of their works fall into one of the various series designed by Schneller.

==== Aluminum ====
One of the first instruments designed by Specimen as a custom order, demand for aluminum instruments rose after they were featured on the cover of Tar's album Clincher. One of the most diverse styles produced by Specimen, Schneller has produced bass guitars, mandolas, and guitars varying from standard design to the "Flying V" design. The stated goal of the Aluminum series is durability. Acoustically, they are described as having the sustain of a hard-bodied guitar with a resonance similar to a traditional acoustic guitar.

==== Pippin ====
The Pippin series is designed in the vein of the Gibson Les Paul. The cutaway design is intended to make the guitar comfortable and easy to play. The majority of the Pippin series are solid-bodied, giving them a long sustain. While styling within the series varies to a degree, they all typically feature artifacts of early 20th century guitars, such as slotted headstocks and engine-turned aluminum accents.

==== Maxwell ====
The Maxwell series is styled after a handmade guitar purchased by Schneller at the Chicago's Maxwell Street Market. Costing only $5, the guitar of unknown origin was crafted improperly from crude materials, giving it a very rough sound and appearance. The Specimen line of Maxwells pays homage to this using raw and unfinished Masonite, bolted on necks, and very simple geometry. It was chosen as Premier Guitar Magazine's "Guitar of the Month" in June 2009.

==== Royale ====
The Royale is a hollow-bodied archtop with side-by-side resonance chambers meant to mimic the curves of the human ear. This design focuses vibrations to the neck of the guitar in the manner that the ear focus vibrations to capture sound. The result is a guitar that provides more biofeedback to the player, intended to allow the player to feel subtle nuances in sustain and intonation.

==== Singletons ====
Specimen has produced a variety of Singletons, or one-off custom designs. Some Singletons were made to order by musicians looking to achieve a certain sound or to reinvent a particular instrument, such as the Electric Lute. Some are reinterpretations or modifications of existing instruments built by Specimen as continued experimentation with design and acoustics. Several Singletons are entirely new instruments, such as the Moule Bird, a hand-held single-stringed instrument that can be plucked or bowed.

=== Audio ===
The stated design principle of Specimen Products' audio equipment emphasizes durability and functionality over feature-rich designs. The tube amplifiers are built without the functionality that comes standard on most production amplifiers, theoretically limiting the number of possible locations for distortion and malfunction, though there is some controversy to this claim.

==== Horn Speakers ====
Specimen Products employs an octagonal resonance horn on all speaker boxes, intended to increase the spatial effect of music played through it. Horn Speakers have been made in varying sizes, from 3 to 8 feet tall. Specimen has made Horn Speakers in a variety of powers, ranging from 10 or less watt speakers for personal use (such as with an MP3 player) to 70 watt pieces intended for stage performance. Andrew Bird uses a specially-designed Horn Speaker known as the Janus Horn, featuring a two-mouthed horn that spins during operation, giving music played through it a Doppler effect.

==== Instrument Amplifiers ====
The Specimen Products line of tube-driven amplifiers began with the Petimor model, a 10-watt birchwood based amplifier designed to accommodate classical guitar. Also available is the Stereo Amp, which is essentially two Petimors in one case, angled at 25 degrees apart. After a variety of smaller-scale experiments, Specimen released the Horn Amp, a single-tube amplifier fitted with a 24 inch horn in order to produce stage-performance level volumes.

==== Hi Fi Stereo Amplifiers ====
Specimen's line of tube amplifiers use 1940s-era tube circuitry, yet is compatible with an iPod or computer. The product line includes a single-ended stereo amp, 300B stereo tube amp, single-ended monoblock, a single-ended 2A3 tube amp, a pentode-driven 2A3 amp, and the Octoblock (an eight channel single ended power amp created for the collaborative project with Andrew Bird called the Sonic Arboretum).

== Notable musicians using Specimen equipment ==
- Andrew Bird – Horn amp, Janus Horn, XL Horn Speakers, Custom Maxwell
- Jack White – Little Horn Speakers, Hi-Fi Stereo Tube Amplifiers, 300-watt subwoofer, single Hornling horn speaker, ceiling Janus double-spinning horn speaker
- Alan Sparhawk (of Low) – Aluminum Thinline-style Telecaster guitar
- Joe Principe (of Rise Against) – Aluminum Jazz Bass
- Jeff Tweedy (of Wilco) – Silvertone Schnellercaster, Little Horn Speakers, Satellite-subwoofer
- Arista Strungys (of Loraxx) – Specimen Flying A
