= The Sea and Cake =

Chicago post-rock band

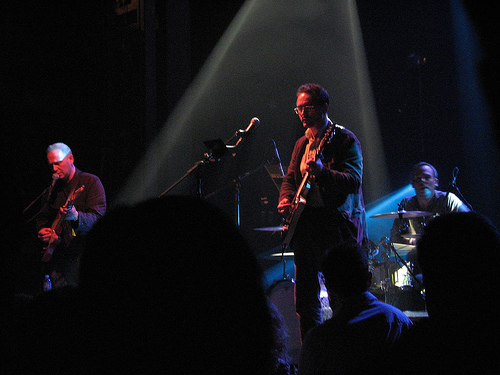
- The Sea and Cake at Webster Hall in 2007. From left: Sam Prekop, Archer Prewitt and John McEntire.

Background information
- Origin: Chicago, Illinois, U.S.
- Genres: Indie rock; post-rock; jazz rock; ambient pop
- Years active: 1994–2004; 2007–present
- Labels: Thrill Jockey, Hefty
- Members: Sam Prekop; Archer Prewitt; John McEntire
- Past members: Eric Claridge
- Website: www.theseaandcake.com

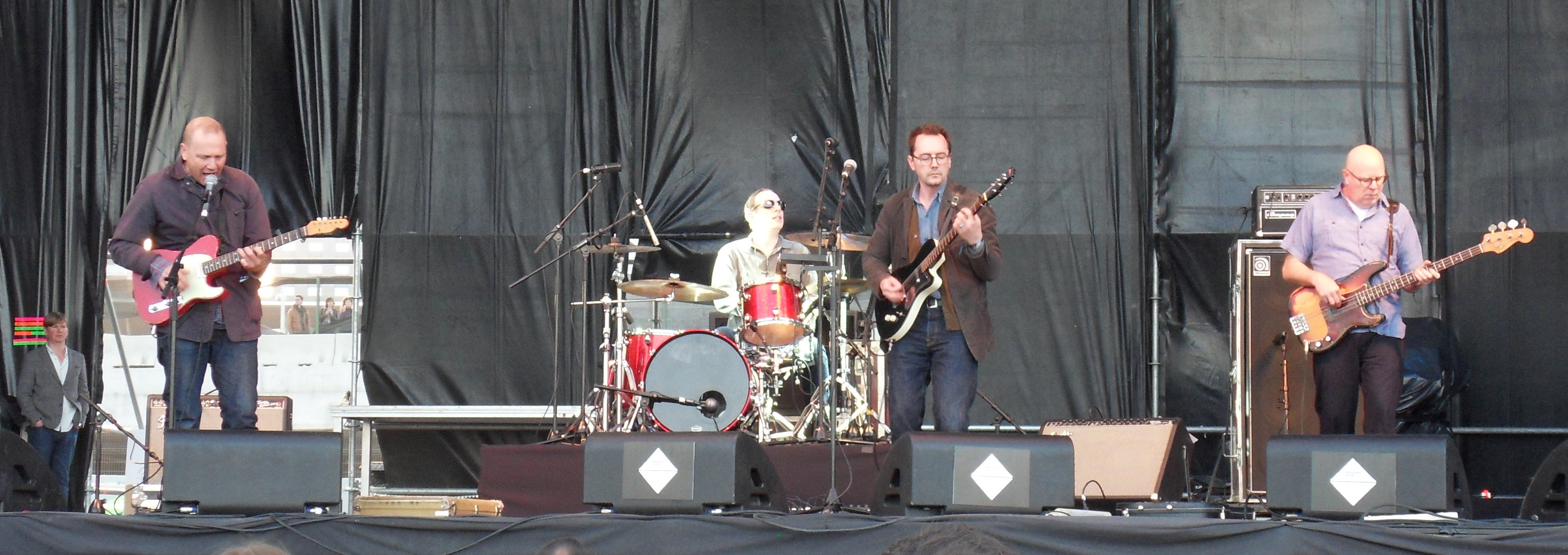
The Sea and Cake at Primavera Sound 2013. From left: Sam Prekop, John McEntire, Archer Prewitt, Doug McCombs (who filled in for Eric Claridge).

The Sea and Cake is an American indie rock band based in Chicago, Illinois, United States.

As part of the Chicago school of post-rock, the group formed in the mid-1990s from members of the Coctails (Archer Prewitt), Shrimp Boat (Sam Prekop and Eric Claridge), and Tortoise (John McEntire); the group's name came from a willful reinterpretation of "The C in Cake", a song by Gastr del Sol, which McEntire was previously a member of. The band's music was described by David Sheppard in Mojo as a "uniquely inventive blend of lilting pop and obtuse art-rock". Starting with its fourth studio album The Fawn (1997), the group has relied on electronic instrumentation such as drum machines and synthesizers to color its music, but has retained its distinctive style with marked influences from jazz, samba and bossa nova. Contrary to his multi-instrumentalist role in Tortoise, John McEntire almost exclusively plays drums in the Sea and Cake.

Members Sam Prekop, Archer Prewitt, and John McEntire have each released solo albums. The cover art of the Sea and Cake's releases are largely paintings by member Eric Claridge and photographs by Prekop. Prewitt has been involved in publishing his own comic books and doing graphic design.

In 1995, the band contributed the song "The Fontana" to the AIDS benefit album Red Hot + Bothered produced by the Red Hot Organization. The band was on hiatus from 2004 to 2007, and Eric Claridge left the band sometime after the release of Runner. Their most recent album, Any Day, was released in May 2018.

== Members ==
- Sam Prekop (vocals, guitar)
- Archer Prewitt (guitar, piano, vocals)
- John McEntire (percussion, drums, some synthesizer)

== Discography ==
All releases on Thrill Jockey Records unless noted.

=== Studio albums ===
- The Sea and Cake (1994)
- Nassau (1995)
- The Biz (1995)
- The Fawn (1997)
- Oui (2000)
- One Bedroom (2003)
- Everybody (2007)
- Car Alarm (2008)
- The Moonlight Butterfly (2011)
- Runner (2012)
- Any Day (2018)

=== EPs and singles ===
- "Glad You're Right" (b/w "Tiger Panther," "Crimson Wing", 7" single, 1995, Lissy's Records [LISS1], limited edition of 500)
- Two Gentlemen (12" EP, mainly remixes, 1997)
- "Window Lights" (b/w "Setup For Bed" (a solo piece by John McEntire), 7" single, 1999, Hefty Records [HEF013], also on Reach the Rock soundtrack, 1999)
- Glass (CD EP, 2003)

=== Compilations ===
- A Brief Historical Retrospective (CD, 1997, Japanese-only compilation of first 2 albums, plus 7" song "Glad You're Right")
- Metro: The Official Bootleg Series, Volume 1 2010
