= Sam Prekop =

American musician

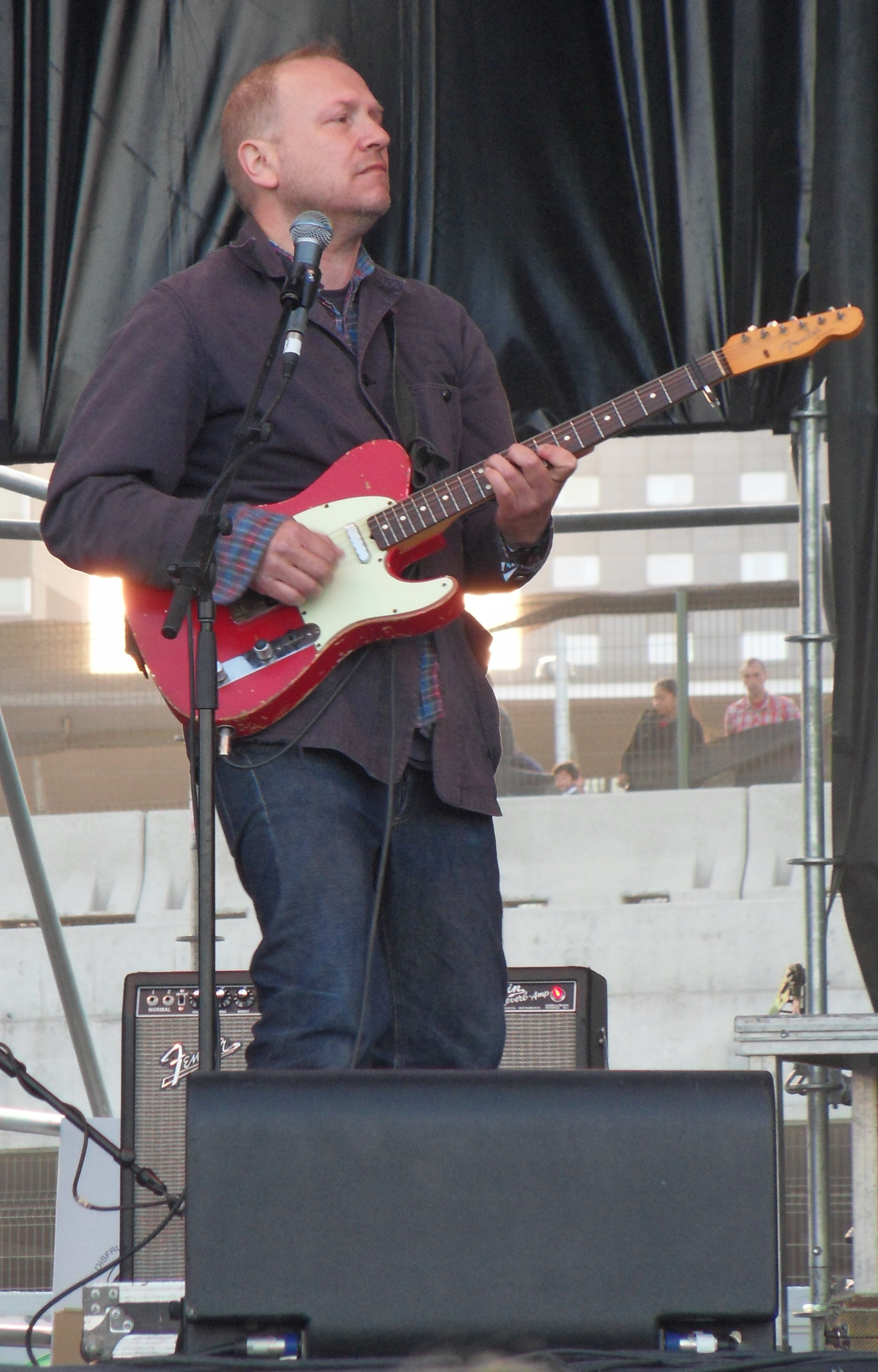
- Sam Prekop at Primavera Sound 2013

Background information
- Born: October 18, 1964 (age 61); London, England
- Origin: Chicago, Illinois, United States
- Genres: Electronic; post-rock; indie rock
- Occupations: Musician; painter
- Instruments: Vocals; guitar; bass guitar
- Years active: 1987–present
- Labels: Thrill Jockey; TAL
- Member of: The Sea and Cake
- Formerly of: Shrimp Boat
- Website: Thrilljockey.com

Sam Prekop (born October 18, 1964) is an American musician in the band The Sea and Cake. He also has released seven solo albums.

== Early life ==
Prekop was born in London, but grew up in Chicago. He studied at the Kansas City Art Institute.

== Career ==
=== Shrimp Boat ===
Back in Chicago, Prekop formed the band Shrimp Boat, which was active from 1988 to 1993.

=== The Sea and Cake ===
After Shrimp Boat dissolved in 1993, Sam Prekop and Eric Claridge formed the Sea and Cake, and recruited Archer Prewitt and John McEntire.

=== Solo career ===
Prekop enlisted the help of Jim O'Rourke (X-Factor) to produce his self-titled first solo album in 1999. Bassist Josh Abrams, drummer Chad Taylor, and guitarist Archer Prewitt also contributed their talents. The album was described as soft and breezy, with tinges of Brazilian pop. In April that year, Prekop performed with Aerial M in Toronto.

In 2005, Who's Your New Professor featured drummer Chad Taylor and cornetist Rob Mazurek (both from the Chicago Underground Duo), bassist Josh Abrams (Sticks & Stones), and the Sea and Cake bandmates Archer Prewitt and John McEntire on guitar and drums, respectively.

Old Punch Card (2010) primarily featured modular synthesizer.

Released in 2015, The Republic further explored the emotional possibilities of the modular synthesizer. The first nine tracks (all named "The Republic") were assembled as part of an art installation by the artist David Hartt also called The Republic.

He then released Comma (2020). It was created by using modular synthesizer, drum machine, and additional synthesizer.

In 2022, he released a collaborative album with John McEntire, titled Sons Of.

Inspired by live performances with Laraaji, he created Open Close (2025).

== Personal life ==
Prekop's father is the photographer Martin Prekop. He has two brothers, the furniture designer Hank Prekop and the painter Zak Prekop. He has two children.

== Discography ==
Studio albums

- Sam Prekop (Thrill Jockey, 1999)
- Who's Your New Professor (Thrill Jockey, 2005)
- Old Punch Card (Thrill Jockey, 2010)
- The Republic (Thrill Jockey, 2015)
- Comma (Thrill Jockey, 2020)
- The Sparrow (TAL, 2022)
- Open Close (Thrill Jockey, 2025)

Collaborative albums

- Sons Of (with John McEntire; Thrill Jockey, 2022)
