= John McEntire =

American musician

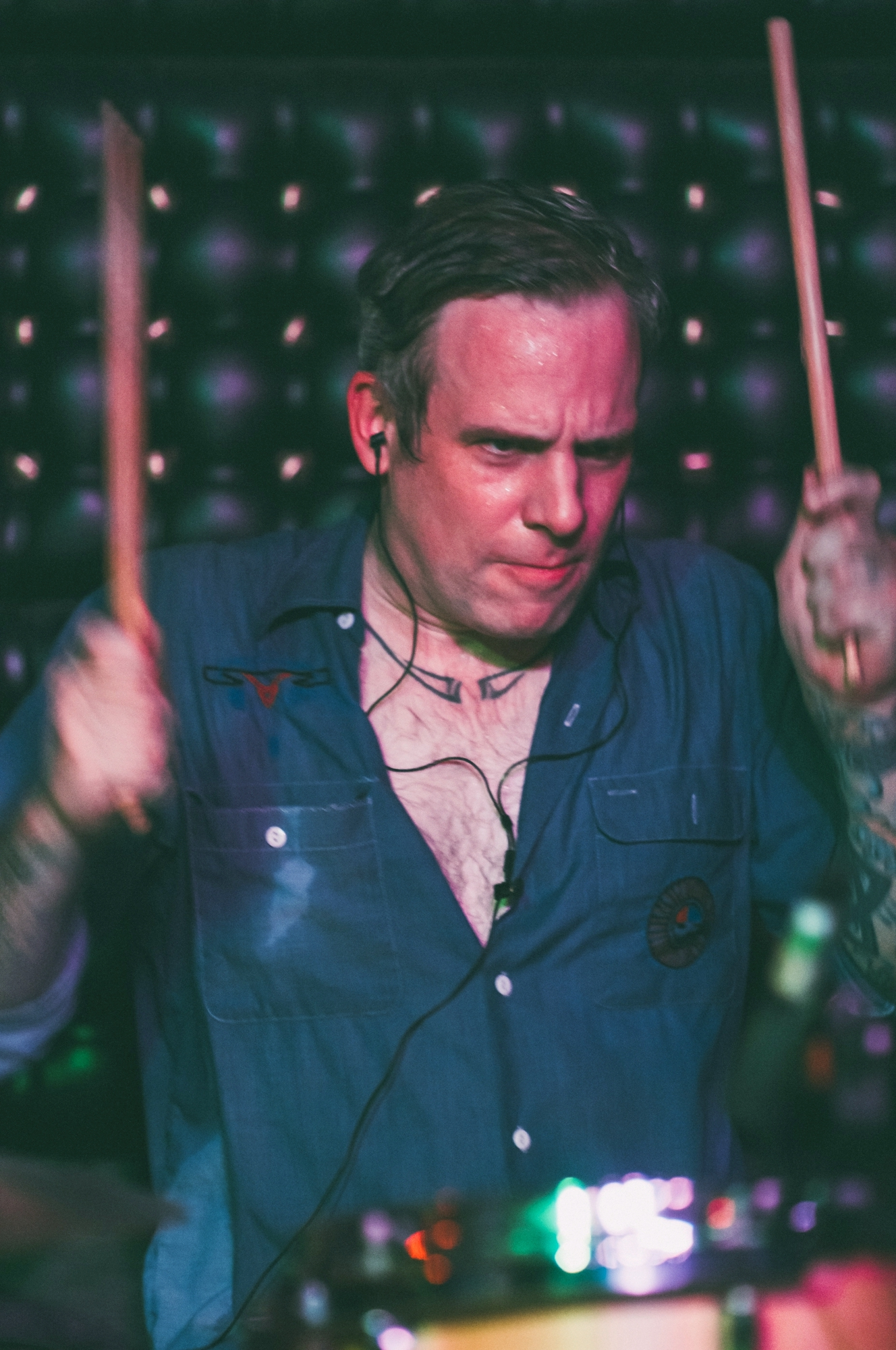
- McEntire performing with The Sea and Cake in 2012

Background information
- Born: April 9, 1970 (age 56); Portland, Oregon, U.S.
- Origin: Chicago, Illinois, U.S.
- Occupations: Musician; record producer; recording engineer
- Instruments: Drums; percussion; synthesizers; electronics
- Years active: 1988–present
- Label: Thrill Jockey
- Member of: Tortoise; The Sea and Cake

John McEntire (born April 9, 1970) is an American recording engineer, producer, drummer, and multi-instrumentalist, based in Chicago, Illinois. He is a member of both Tortoise and the Sea and Cake.

== Early life ==
McEntire was born on April 9, 1970, in Portland, Oregon. He started playing drums at age 10. Throughout high school, he performed in marching bands and studied privately for seven years. He went on to attend Oberlin Conservatory initially as a percussion major, but eventually switched to study in the school's then newly created program for Technology in Music and Related Arts.

== Musical career ==
While attending Oberlin, McEntire briefly played with Mark Edwards in My Dad Is Dead in 1988, and then joined Bastro with David Grubbs and Clark Johnson in 1989. In 1991, he relocated along with Grubbs and Bundy K. Brown to Chicago where they changed their musical direction and became the first incarnation of Gastr Del Sol. Their debut album, The Serpentine Similar, was released in 1993. McEntire and Brown left to play in Tortoise in 1994, yet McEntire continued to make contributions to Gastr Del Sol's later recordings and performances.

McEntire had also played in Seam, the Stokastikats, Stereolab, and the Oily Bloodmen. He was a principal musician on Jim O'Rourke's Terminal Pharmacy and has appeared on many other solo O'Rourke projects.

McEntire is currently a member of Tortoise, the Sea and Cake, and Red Krayola. His drumming work as a sideman can be heard on recordings, such as Since by Richard Buckner, Enantiodromia and Life on the Fly by Azita, Near-Life Experience by Come, Kernel by Seam, Chicago Wednesday by Jandek, and The Spectrum Between by David Grubbs.

In 2022, he released a collaborative studio album with Sam Prekop, titled Sons Of.

== Production/engineering work ==
As a producer and engineer, McEntire has mixed and remixed recordings by many artists. He also owns and operates Soma Electronic Music Studios in Gladstone, Oregon, which he relocated in 2019 after 25 years in the Wicker Park neighborhood of Chicago and then brief stints in Los Angeles and Nevada City.

McEntire produces and engineers most of the recordings for his own bands, as well as many of the solo efforts by bandmates Sam Prekop, Archer Prewitt, Jeff Parker, and Doug McCombs. He has also engineered, produced, and/or mixed albums and tracks for many artists including: Bell Orchestre, Stereolab, Bright Eyes, Bobby Conn, Teenage Fanclub, Sylvain Chauveau, Kaki King, Tom Ze, the Ex, Smog, Trans Am, Eleventh Dream Day, Cougar, Antibalas, Innaway, the For Carnation, Dianogah, U.S. Maple, Chicago Underground Duo, Spookey Ruben, Blur, Pivot, the Fiery Furnaces, the Car Is on Fire, Small Sins, Broken Social Scene, Coldcut, Spoon, Jaga Jazzist, Great 3, Yo La Tengo, Radian, Pia Fraus, and most recently, La Ciencia Simple.

McEntire is a pioneering user of modern digital audio workstation software, first employing Pro Tools on the 1997 the Sea and Cake album The Fawn and then on Stereolab's Dots and Loops, released later the same year.

== Discography ==
=== Studio albums ===
- Sons Of (with Sam Prekop, Thrill Jockey, 2022)
