= Archer Prewitt =

American musician and cartoonist

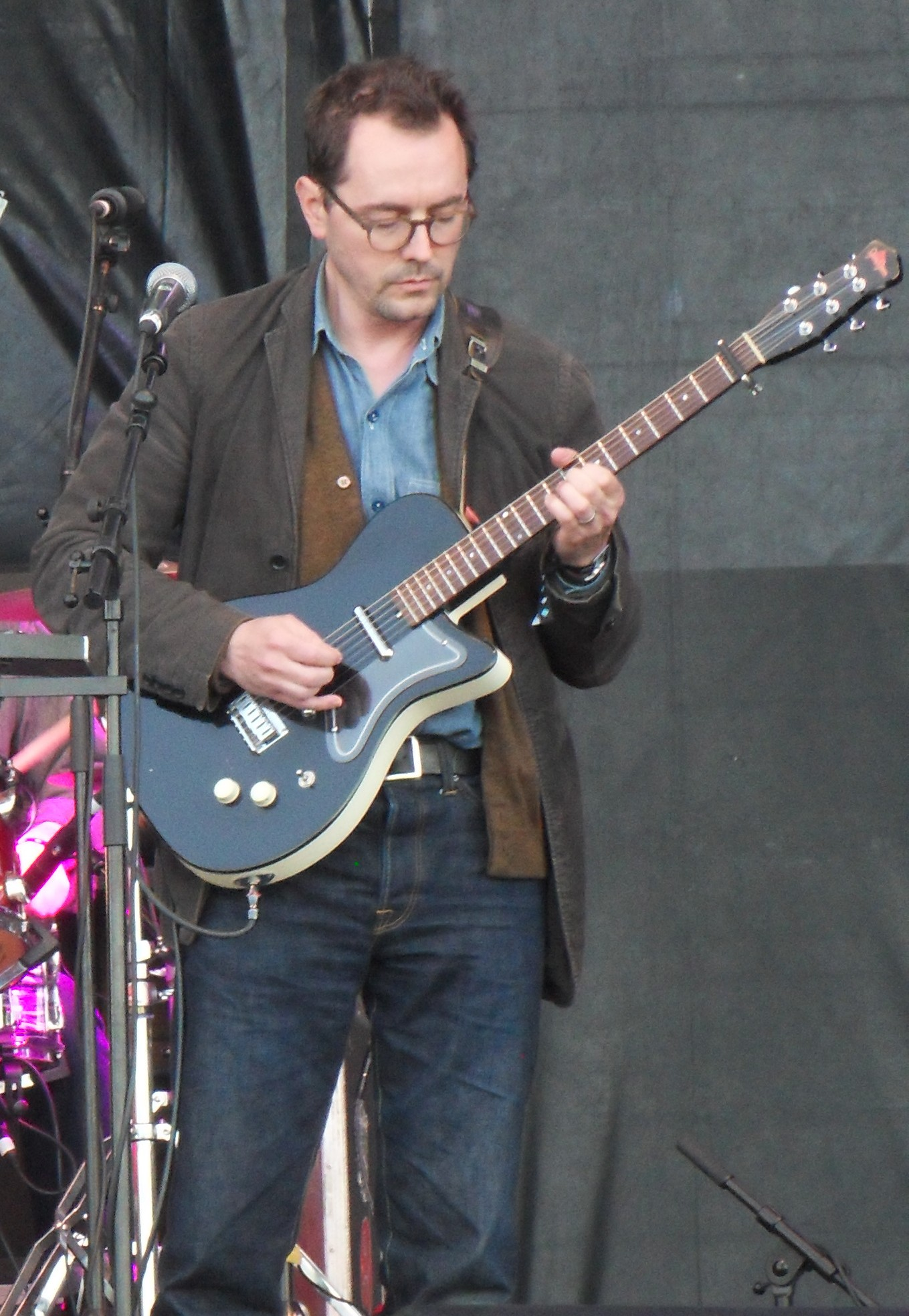
- Archer Prewitt at Primavera Sound 2013

Background information
- Born: 1963 (age 62–63); Frankfort, Kentucky, United States
- Origin: Chicago, Illinois
- Genres: Indie rock, post rock
- Years active: 1988–present
- Label: Thrill Jockey

Archer Prewitt (born 1963 in Frankfort, Kentucky) is an American musician and cartoonist associated with the independent music scene in Chicago, Illinois.

== Biography ==
=== Music ===
Prewitt enrolled in the Kansas City Art Institute and began drumming in the band Tunnel Dogs and then Mudhead. Archer also played bass in Kansas City local favorites the Bangtails. A song by the Bangtails appears on the 2020 compilation Strum & Thrum: The American Jangle Underground 1983-1987. He then co-founded the Coctails, who moved from Kansas City to Chicago after their first album (1989) and went on to release six albums in all by the time they played their last show on New Year's Eve 1995/96. By then Prewitt had also been involved with a new project, the Sea and Cake, who have released several critically acclaimed albums. Concomitant with his work in the Sea and Cake, Prewitt produced several solo releases.

=== Comics and illustration ===
In addition to his music, Prewitt is a freelance illustrator, cartoonist, and comic book colorist. His first professional illustrations were for the Kansas City Star while he still lived there. In 1992, he started drawing and self-publishing his Sof' Boy mini-comic, while also working as a colorist for Marvel Comics. Sof' Boy has subsequently been published by Kitchen Sink Press and Fantagraphics Books. Another Prewitt character is Funny Bunny, who has made several appearances in diverse publications, including Mome. Prewitt's work has appeared in Zero Zero, Drawn & Quarterly, Timothy McSweeney's Quarterly Concern, and BLAB!.

Prewitt was nominated for a 1998 Eisner Award for Best Colorist for the 1997 publication of Sof' Boy and Friends #1, published by Drawn & Quarterly.

== Discography ==
- In the Sun (Carrot Top Records / Hi-Ball Records, 1997)
- White Sky (Carrot Top Records, 1999)
- Gerroa Songs EP (Carrot Top Records, 2000)
- Three (Thrill Jockey, 2002)
- Wilderness (Thrill Jockey, 2005)

== Bibliography ==
- "The City That Never Sleeps" (art only), Duplex Planet Illustrated #2 (Fantagraphics, April 1993)
- "Sof' Boy," Drawn & Quarterly #4 (Drawn & Quarterly, December 1995)
- Zero Zero #7, 8, 14 (Fantagraphics, 1996–1997)
- BLAB! #9 (Fantagraphics, 1997)
- BLAB! #10 (Fantagraphics, 1998)
- Sof' Boy & Friends #1–3 (Fantagraphics, 1997–2004)
- Timothy McSweeney's Quarterly Concern #13: "An Assorted Sampler of North American Comic Drawings, Strips, and Illustrated Stories, &c." (McSweeney's, spring 2004)
