= Music of Chicago =

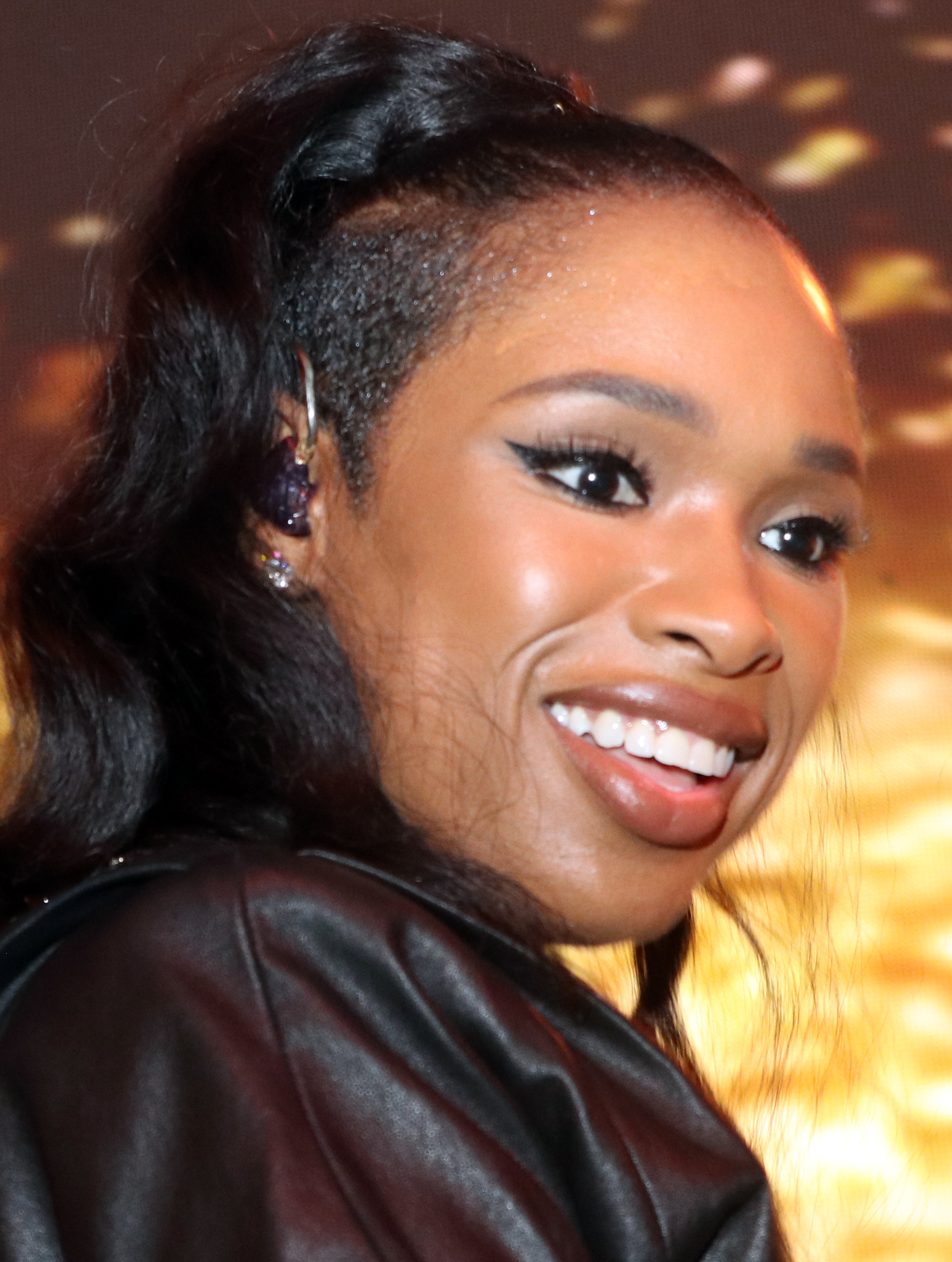
Jennifer Hudson, one of Chicago's most successful musical artists

Chicago, Illinois, is a major center for music in the Midwestern United States where distinctive forms of blues (greatly responsible for the future creation of rock and roll), and house music (a genre of electronic dance music), were developed.

The "Great Migration" of poor black workers from the South into the industrial cities brought traditional jazz and blues music to the city, resulting in Chicago blues and "Chicago-style" Dixieland jazz. Notable blues artists included Muddy Waters, Junior Wells, Howlin' Wolf and both Sonny Boy Williamsons; jazz greats included Nat King Cole, Gene Ammons, Benny Goodman and Bud Freeman. Chicago is also well known for its soul music.

In the early 1930s, gospel music began to gain popularity in Chicago due to Thomas A. Dorsey's contributions at Pilgrim Baptist Church.

In the 1980s and 1990s, heavy rock, punk, metal and hip-hop also became popular in Chicago. Orchestras in Chicago include the Chicago Symphony Orchestra, the Lyric Opera of Chicago and the Chicago Sinfonietta.

== Blues ==
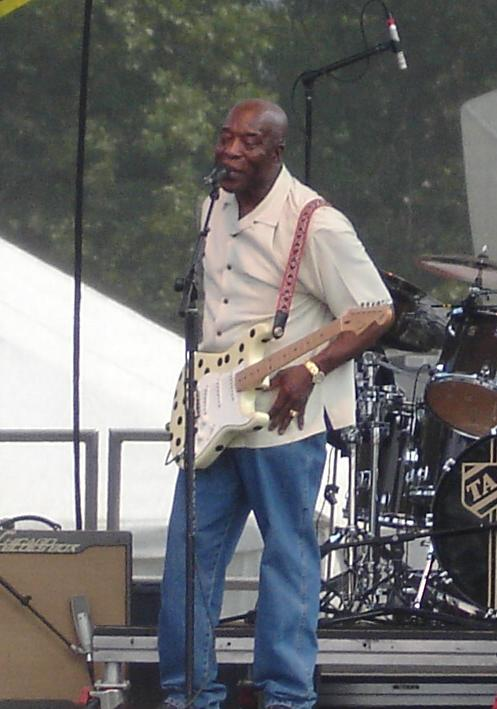
Guitarist Buddy Guy (born in 1936) performing at the Bonnaroo Music Festival in 2006

Chicago's music scene has been well known for its blues music for many years. "Chicago Blues" uses a variety of instruments in a way which heavily influenced early rock and roll music, including instruments like electrically amplified guitar, drums, piano, bass guitar and sometimes the saxophone or harmonica, which are generally used in Delta blues, which originated in Mississippi. Chicago Blues has a more extended palette of notes than the standard six-note blues scale; often, notes from the major scale and dominant 9th chords are added, which gives the music more of a "jazz feel" while still being in the blues genre. Chicago blues is also known for its heavy rolling bass. The music developed mainly as a result of the "Great Migration" of poor black workers from the South into the industrial cities of the North, such as Chicago in particular, in the first half of the 20th century.

Chicago is one of the places where the faster, juicier boogie-woogie emerged from the blues. The most renowned early recordings of boogies were made in Chicago with Clarence Pinetop Smith, who might have been influenced by the brothers Hersal Thomas and George W. Thomas from Houston, who were together in Chicago in the 1920s.

Chicago blues and boogie music continues to be popular today with the annual Chicago Blues Festival, and with appreciation of many musicians such as Muddy Waters, Howlin' Wolf, and Willie Dixon; guitar players such as Tampa Red, Buddy Guy, Bo Diddley, Elmore James and Lefty Dizz; and "harp" (blues slang for harmonica) players such as Big Walter Horton, Little Walter, Sonny Boy Williamson I, Syl Johnson, Charlie Musselwhite, Paul Butterfield, Junior Wells, and, most notably, James Cotton.

== House ==
An honorary street name sign in Chicago for house music and Frankie Knuckles (1955–2014)

House music originated in a Chicago nightclub called The Warehouse. Chicago house is the earliest style of house music. While the origins of the name "house music" are unclear, the most popular belief is that it can be traced to the name of that club. DJ Frankie Knuckles originally popularized house music while working at The Warehouse.

House music was developed in the houses, garages and clubs of Chicago, and was initially for local club-goers in the "underground" club scenes, rather than for widespread commercial release. As a result, the recordings were much more conceptual, and longer than the music usually played on commercial radio. House musicians used analog synthesizers and sequencers to create and arrange the electronic elements and samples on their tracks, combining live traditional instruments and percussion and soulful vocals with preprogrammed electronic synthesizers and "beat-boxes".

House, perhaps more than any other form of black music, has birthed many offshoots and spread its sound far and wide. The prevalence of four on the floor beats in dance music is largely derived from house. It has influenced, in some capacity, garage house, jungle music, Eurodance, electropop, dubstep, and even certain elements of alternative rock and hip-hop.

Important musicians in the Chicago house scene include Adonis, Mark Farina, Keith Farley, Felix da Housecat, Fingers Inc., Ron Hardy, Larry Heard, Steve 'Silk' Hurley, Marshall Jefferson, Curtis Jones, Paul Johnson, Frankie Knuckles, Lil' Louis, Jesse Saunders, Joe Smooth, Julius the Mad Thinker and Ten City

The city is host to the Chicago House Music Festival, which is held at Millennium park in the late summer.

== Jazz ==
=== The Chicago style ===
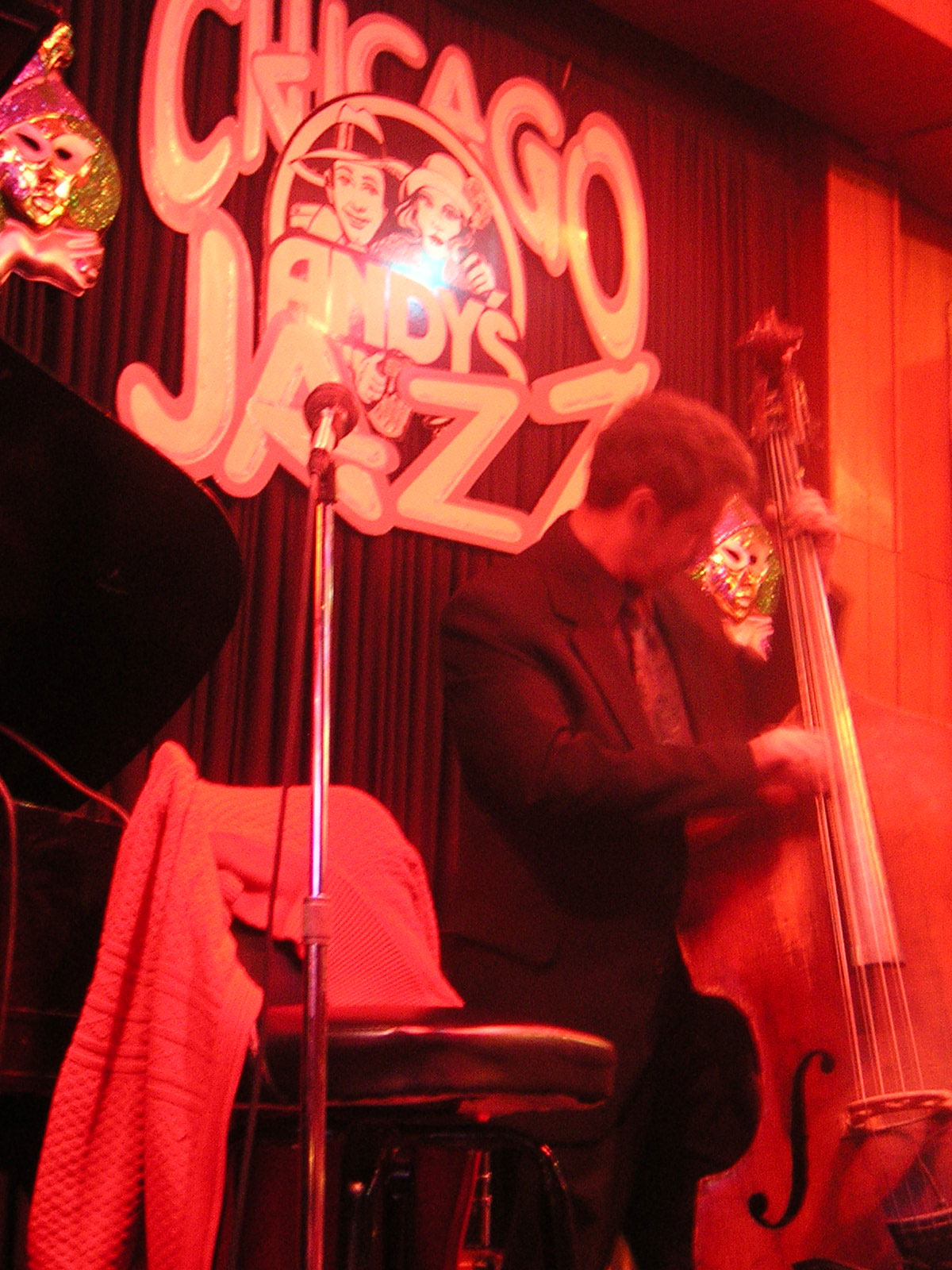
1A Chicago Jazz Club

The "Chicago style" of jazz originated in southern musicians moving North after 1917, bringing with them the New Orleans "Dixieland" or sometimes called "hot jazz" styles.

Dixieland largely evolved into Chicago style in the late 1910s and the new style was popularly called that name by the early 1920s.

King Oliver and Jelly Roll Morton became stars of the Chicago jazz scene. King Oliver in particular brought Louis Armstrong to Chicago in 1922 while he was performing at the Dreamland Café with his "Creole Jazz Band". More importantly, white musicians, or "alligators", attended Oliver's performances in order to learn how to play jazz. Louis Armstrong's recordings with his Chicago-based Louis Armstrong and his Hot Five and Hot Seven band came out in the years 1925 to 1928 and were popular with both black and white audiences. These recordings marked the transition of original New Orleans jazz to a more sophisticated type of American improvised music with more emphasis on solo choruses instead of just little solo breaks. This style of playing was adopted by white musicians who favored meters of 2 instead of 4. Emphasis on solos, faster tempos, string bass and guitar (replacing the traditional tuba and banjo) and saxophones also distinguish Chicago-style playing from New Orleans style. When Chicago musicians started playing four-beat measures, they laid the foundation for the swing era. The Lindy Hop was originally danced to four-beat Chicago style jazz and went on to become one of the iconic features of the swing era.

Important musicians in the Chicago style include Lovie Austin, Muggsy Spanier, Jimmy McPartland, Bix Beiderbecke, Eddie Condon, Bud Freeman, Benny Goodman, Gene Krupa, Frank Teschemacher, and Frank Trumbauer. The gangsters of Chicago engaged profiled musicians like Earl Hines, whose benefit was to lead an orchestra in one of the city's top locations. Armstrong was also friendly with gangsters, such as Al Capone who frequently paid for private use of jazz clubs. Hines and Benny Goodman emancipated from Chicago style when they became two of the most famous band leaders of the swing era.

Two decades later, original Chicago-style pianist Art Hodes presented the classic jazz style in a TV show series.

=== Modern Chicago jazz ===
From the mid 1960s to the present day the Association for the Advancement of Creative Musicians has nurtured "Great Black Music: Ancient to the Future".

Chicago's jazz scene includes the annual Chicago Jazz Festival which has its origins in the 1970s. Festival performers have included Miles Davis, Sonny Rollins, Ornette Coleman, Benny Carter, Ella Fitzgerald, Anthony Braxton, Betty Carter, Lionel Hampton, Chico O'Farrill's big band, Jimmy Dawkins, Von Freeman, Johnny Frigo, Slide Hampton, and Roy Haynes.

Musicians from all surviving eras of jazz perform regularly in the city, release recordings, and tour nationally and internationally.

Sinyan Shen, internationally known for his Shanghai classical repertoire and Shanghai jazz performances based on tonal interests and just intervals, is based in Chicago.

Musicians still performing today who originally came to prominence in the bebop and hard bop eras include Von Freeman and Jimmy Ellis, both contemporaries of former Chicagoan Johnny Griffin.

Members of Chicago's Association for the Advancement of Creative Musicians working regularly in the city include Fred Anderson, Ernest Dawkins, Aaron Getsug, and Isaiah Spencer. Since the 1960s, members of the organization have performed their version of "Great Black Music" throughout the world.

Jazz musicians who emerged since the early 1990s include Marbin, David Boykin, Karl E. H. Seigfried, Jeff Parker, Joshua Abrams, and Jim Baker. Many of these musicians incorporate a variety of styles and techniques.

== Soul ==
From the mid-1960s to the late 1970s a new style of soul music emerged from Chicago. Its sound, like southern soul with its rich influence of black gospel music, also exhibited an unmistakable gospel sound, but was somewhat lighter and more delicate in its approach, and was sometimes called "soft soul".

Popular R&B/soul artists from Chicago include The Impressions, Sam Cooke, Curtis Mayfield, Lou Rawls, The Five Stairsteps, The Staple Singers, Earth Wind & Fire, Rufus, Chaka Khan, Dave Hollister, The Emotions, The Chi-lites, R. Kelly, Carl Thomas, and Jennifer Hudson. Chicago soul labels, including Vee-Jay, Chess Records, OKeh, ABC-Paramount, Brunswick, and Curtom, established a major presence in R&B/soul music.

=== Vee-Jay Records ===
Vee-Jay Records is an American record label founded in the 1950s, located in Chicago and specializing in blues, jazz, rhythm and blues and rock and roll. The label was founded in Gary, Indiana in 1953 by Vivian Carter and James C. Bracken (shortly after moving to Chicago), a husband-and-wife team who used their initials for the label's name. Vee-Jay hold historical significance being one of the first African American and female owned record companies.

=== Chess Records ===
Chess Records was an American record company established in 1950 in Chicago, specializing in blues and rhythm and blues. It was the successor to Aristocrat Records, founded in 1947. It expanded into soul music, gospel music, early rock and roll, and jazz and comedy recordings, released on the Chess and its subsidiary labels Checker and Argo/Cadet. Chess was based at several locations on the south side of Chicago, initially at South Cottage Grove Ave. The most famous was 2120 S. Michigan Avenue, from May 1957 to 1965, immortalized by the Rolling Stones in "2120 South Michigan Avenue", an instrumental recorded there during the group's first U.S. tour in 1964. The building is now the home of Willie Dixon's Blues Heaven Foundation.

== Rock ==
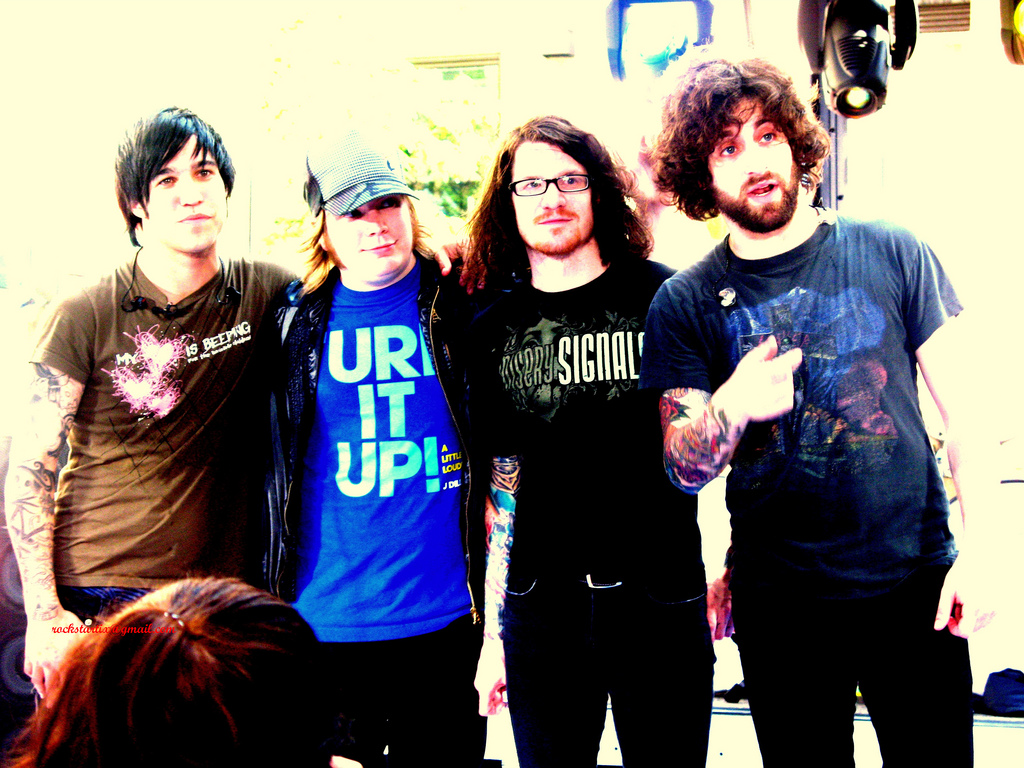
Fall Out Boy in 2007

In 1965 Chicago's burgeoning pop rock horn sound moved into national exposure with the brass arrangements in early recordings by The Buckinghams, who recorded their first hits at the historic Chess Studios. Their horn sound was followed quickly and expanded upon substantially by the rock band Chicago, originally named the Chicago Transit Authority. Other popular Chicago-based bands from the 1960s and 1970s include Shadows of Knight, Cryan' Shames, The Buckinghams, The Flock, Ides of March, New Colony Six, Mason Proffit, Styx, Survivor, REO Speedwagon (Champaign) and Cheap Trick (Rockford).

As documented in Michael Azerrad's Our Band Could Be Your Life, the 1980s independent music scene was active in Chicago. Some of the more famous punk and "post-punk" bands originating from the city were Naked Raygun, The Effigies, 88 Fingers Louie, Big Black, The Queers and Screeching Weasel, with punk legend Patti Smith also born in the city. Many of these bands would become major precursors to pop punk (Screeching Weasel and The Queers) and post-hardcore (Big Black and Naked Raygun). At this time Steve Albini (of Big Black) also began his prolific recording engineer work with acts both local and national. The Victims represented Chicago on the New Wave scene.

The 1980s punk scene eventually gave way to the 1990s alternative rock boom with artists like Local H, Eleventh Dream Day, Ministry, Veruca Salt (the band Seether is named after their song "Seether"), My Life with the Thrill Kill Kult, Material Issue, Liz Phair, Urge Overkill, LaTour, The Jesus Lizard, and The Smashing Pumpkins gaining fame. Many of these bands got their career started at noted alternative music venues Metro (originally Cabaret Metro) and Lounge Ax, and later on influential alternative music station Q101. Alternative icons Eddie Vedder (Pearl Jam), Kim Thayil (Soundgarden), Adam Jones (Tool), and Tom Morello (Rage Against the Machine) also attended school in the area. In the late 1990s, along with Milwaukee, WI and Champaign-Urbana, IL, Chicago also supported a healthy midwestern emo/post-hardcore scene that included Cap'n Jazz, Braid and American Football.

Since the late 1990s/early 2000s, Chicago has also become a major force in the American heavy metal scene including a handful of deathcore, death metal and industrial metal groups supported and promoted by indie labels like Wax Trax! Records among others. Bands such as, Disturbed, SOiL, From Zero, No One, Ministry, Dance Club Massacre, Born of Osiris, Veil of Maya, Macabre, Oceano and Lovehammers hail from the Chicago area.

Since the 2000s Chicago has remained a hotbed for independent music. Being home to a number of independent record labels such as Touch and Go Records, Thrill Jockey Records, Bloodshot Records, Drag City Records, Victory Records and Hozac Records, Chicago continues to have one of the most active indie scenes in the United States. The area is home to the foundations of American hardcore punk, alt-country, noise rock, industrial music, and many other independent music scenes.

Contemporary bands with ties to Chicago include Wilco, Tortoise, The Sea and Cake, Califone, The Greenskeepers, The Loneliest Monk, The Mekons, Smith Westerns, Andrew Bird, Umphrey's McGee, Neko Case, and Matthew & Eleanor Friedberger of the Fiery Furnaces. The 2000s have also seen many punk/pop/rock bands from the Chicago area attain national success, including Disturbed, SOiL, Alkaline Trio, Kill Hannah, The Academy Is, Rise Against, The Audition, Spitalfield, Chevelle, the Plain White T's, and OK Go.

Fall Out Boy, from Wilmette, Illinois, has been the most commercially successful band to come from the Chicago area in recent years, scoring 4 #1 albums on the Billboard Hot 200.

Despite the scene's frequent distaste for local politics, city funding has allowed Chicago to become America's premier music festival city, hosting popular indie headliners such as Superchunk, Black Francis, Pavement, The Flaming Lips, Spoon, De La Soul, Mos Def, Isis, Olivia Tremor Control and Junior Boys. It has also hosted music festivals such as Pitchfork Music Festival, Lollapalooza (since 2005), Chicago Blues Festival, Alehorn of Power, Riot Fest, and a free weekly Monday music series called "Downtown Sound", at Millennium Park's Jay Pritzker Pavilion.

Chicago's music scene varies from neighborhood to neighborhood, but overall has a large focus on independent music due to its influences from local record stores and local radio stations WXRT-FM and Loyola University Chicago's WLUW. While the scenes vary many Chicago residents in the south side have collectively decided to create a scene of groove and thrash metal called Southside Chicago Metal. Bands in the Southside Chicago Metal scene are Guttural, Satara, etc.

Chicago is home to media tastemakers Pitchfork Media, The Onion's The A.V. Club, Consequence of Sound, the nationally syndicated Sound Opinions radio talk show, and CHIRP, a community radio station providing the internet with independent music. The station also bids for support to convince the United States Congress and the FCC to remove existing barriers to low power FM radio licenses in urban areas.

== Hip-hop/rap ==
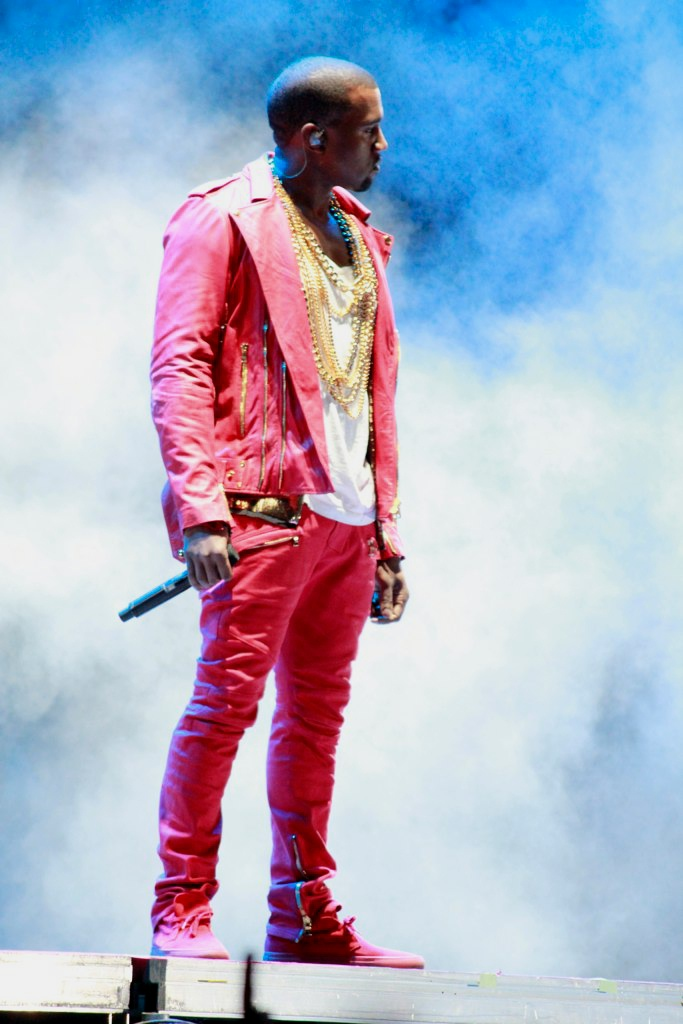
Kanye West, Chicago's most successful rapper

The hip hop of Chicago is sometimes called "Chi-town" in the music industry. It became commonplace for serious rappers to cite the Nation of Islam, a Black Muslim organization headquartered in Chicago, as a lyrical and ideological influence in the 1980s and 1990s, a rap theme often resulting in controversy.

Kanye West's first album was nominated for Grammy Award for Album of the Year and won Best Rap Album. Lupe Fiasco's 2006 album Lupe Fiasco's Food & Liquor was a #1 selling rap album. Juice WRLD won the Billboard Music Award for Top New Artist, reflecting Chicago's impact on the music industry.

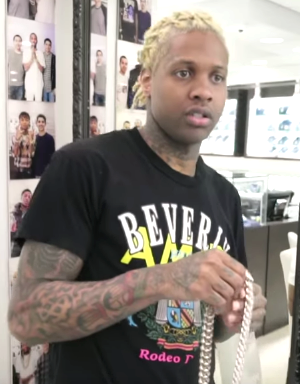
Lil Durk

Today, Chicago is well established within the hip hop industry. Drill music was also born in Chicago.

== Gospel ==
Chicago artists and impresarios have been important in the development of the Gospel music genre. Its origin and rise in popularity is mainly due to the "godfather of Gospel music", Thomas A. Dorsey. Dorsey began his career as a blues pianist, but later began composing religious music to the rhythms of jazz and blues, later calling it "Gospel". His most popular song, "Precious Lord, Take My Hand", was a favorite of Martin Luther King Jr., and was sung by Mahalia Jackson by his request at his funeral. Many other artists have recorded their own renditions of "Precious Lord", including another Chicago Gospel artist, Albertina Walker. Dorsey influenced other Chicago Gospel artists such as The Caravans and Little Joey McClork.

Tired of the treatment he received in other music publishing houses, Dorsey founded his own called Dorsey House of Music.

Music historians often cite Pilgrim Baptist Church in Chicago's Bronzeville neighborhood as the birthplace of Gospel music. Originators of the genre, including James Cleveland, The Staples Singers, and the Edwin Hawkins singers, have performed there.

Other instrumental members in the Gospel music movement were Roberta Martin, Sallie Martin, Kenneth Morris, and "Little Lucy" Smith.

The influences of jazz and blues have been replaced by more contemporary genres like hip hop music, rap, and rhythm and blues.

Chicago is home to the annual GospelFest where traditional and contemporary Gospel choirs perform.

Rev. Milton Brunson and The Thompson Community Singers originated in Chicago. Dr. Charles G. Hayes and Rev. Dr. Clay Evans both had chart-topping choirs in Chicago. Urban contemporary gospel artists such as Ray and Percy Bady, Darius Brooks, Ricky Dillard & New Generation Chorale, Joshua's Troop, New Direction, Shekinah Glory Ministry, and VaShawn Mitchell all have had Gospel hits and hail from Chicago and its surrounding suburbs.

== Mexican regional music ==
Chicago's large Mexican and Mexican-American population has supported a significant market for regional Mexican music, including touring acts, local bands, and a dense network of clubs and social dances (bailes). Within this environment, the Chicago area played a formative role in the development and dissemination of duranguense, a regional Mexican style that emerged through diasporic innovation and later gained wide popularity in Mexico and across the Mexican cultural sphere.

=== Duranguense ===
Although duranguense draws on earlier northern Mexican brass-band traditions associated with the state of Durango, its emergence as a distinct, high-energy style is closely linked to the Chicago area. During the late 1990s and early 2000s, Mexican and Mexican-American musicians in Chicago developed a fast-tempo ensemble sound that adapted regional Mexican brass traditions to urban club and dance-hall settings, contributing to the genre's recognizable sonic profile.

Within this scene, the associated dance style known as pasito duranguense developed among Mexican immigrants in Chicago and its western suburbs. The dance emerged from local social venues before spreading to audiences in Mexico and throughout the Mexican diaspora in the United States.

El Álamo de Aurora, a dance venue in Aurora, Illinois, emerged as an early center of the pasito duranguense scene and a formative site in the genre's early-2000s rise.

From Chicago, duranguense gained national and international visibility during the mid-2000s, with the style and dance spreading widely through Mexico and other parts of Latin America. Artists associated with the Chicago-area scene, including Grupo Montéz de Durango and Los Horóscopos de Durango, played a central role in popularizing the genre beyond the Midwest.

== Music venues and institutions in Chicago ==
=== Venues ===
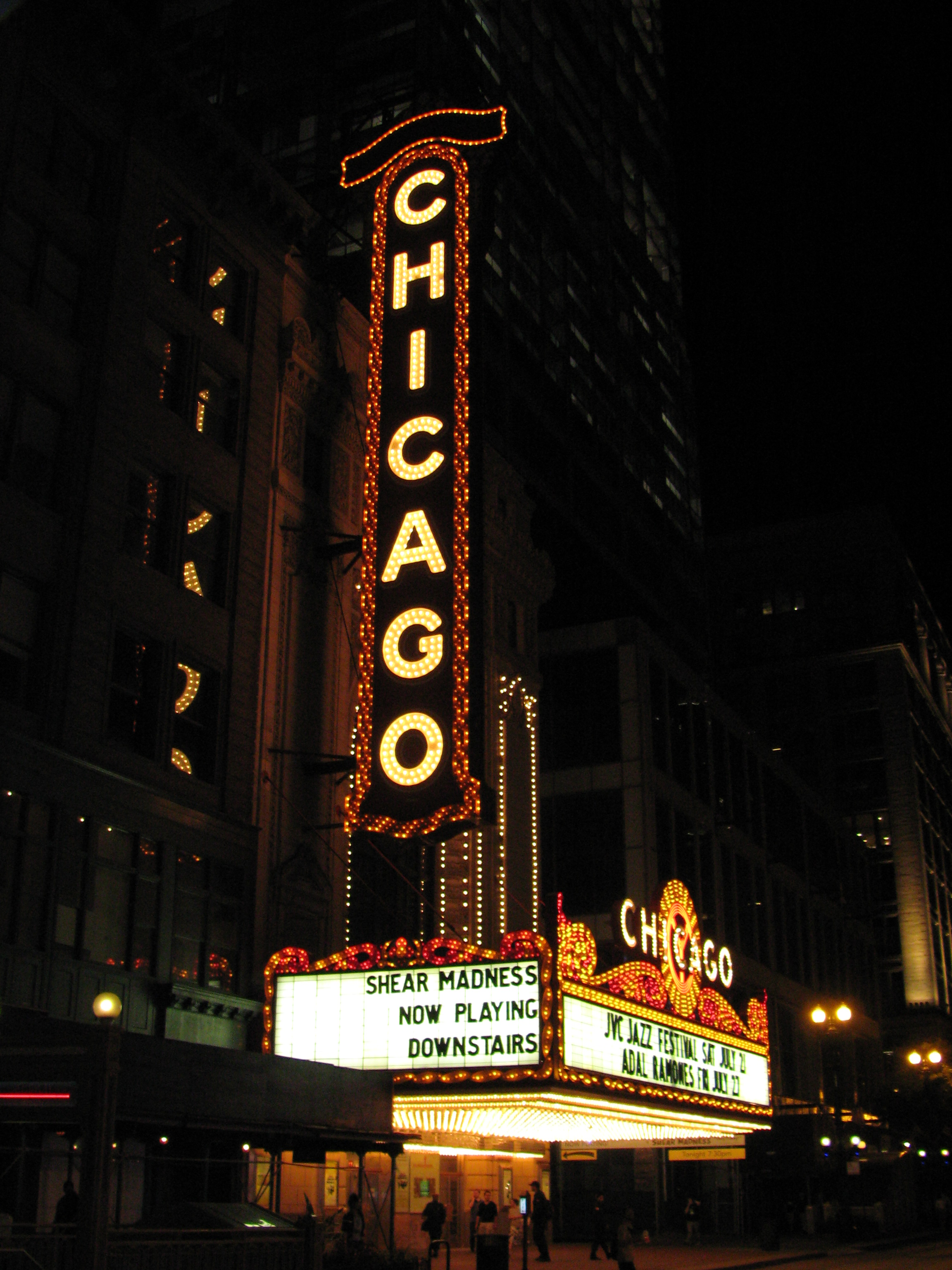
Chicago Theatre at night

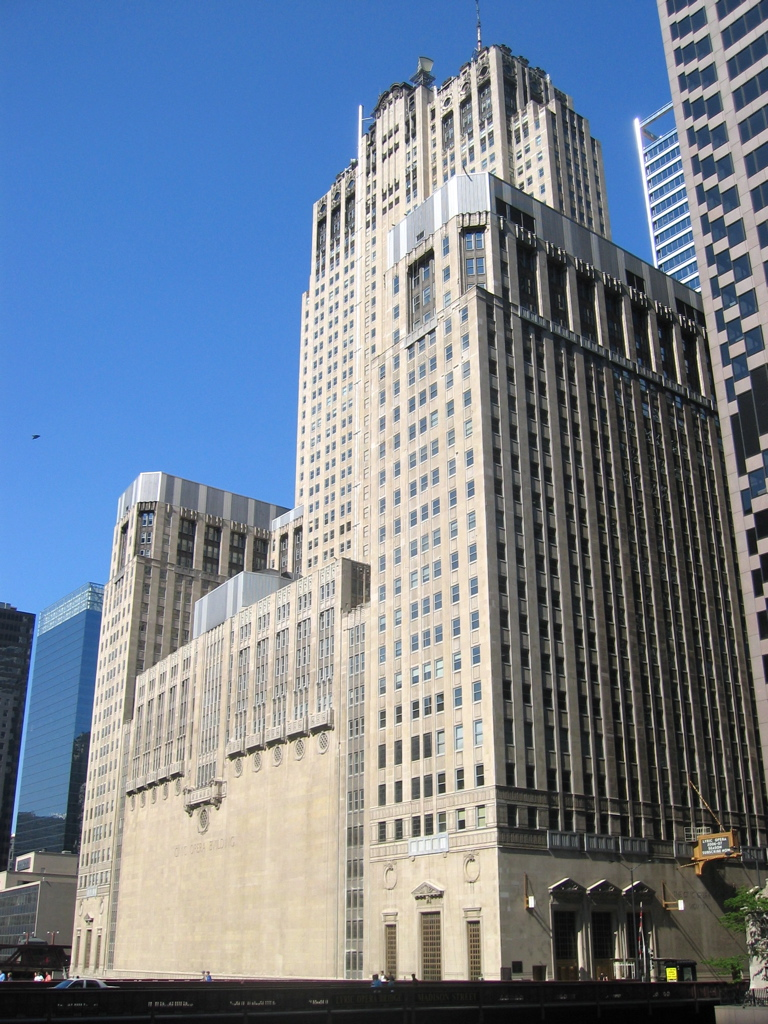
Exterior of the Civic Opera House

The area in and around Chicago has many music venues, including:

- Arcada Theater Building, in St. Charles
- Aragon Ballroom
- Arie Crown Theatre
- Auditorium Theatre
- Bottom Lounge
- Huntington Bank Pavilion
- Chicago Shakespeare Theater
- Chicago Theatre
- City Winery (Chicago)
- Civic Opera House
- Congress Theater
- Constellation
- Copernicus Center (Chicago, Illinois)
- The Cubby Bear
- Drury Lane Theatres, in several locations
- The Empty Bottle
- FitzGerald's Night Club, in Berwyn
- Ford Center for the Performing Arts Oriental Theatre
- Goodman Theatre
- Green Mill Cocktail Lounge
- Harris Theater
- The Hideout Inn
- Hollywood Casino Amphitheatre (Tinley Park, Illinois)
- Horseshoe Casino Hammond, in Hammond, Indiana
- House of Blues (Chicago)
- Hungry Brain
- Irish American Heritage Center
- Jay Pritzker Pavilion
- The Jazz Showcase
- Kingston Mines (blues club)
- LaSalle Bank Theatre
- Lincoln Hall
- Logan Center of the Arts
- Marriott Theatre, in Lincolnshire
- Metro
- North Shore Center for the Performing Arts, in Skokie
- Old Town School of Folk Music
- Park West
- Petrillo Music Shell
- Portage Theater
- Ravinia Park
- Riviera Theatre
- Rosemont Theater, in Rosemont
- Sears Centre, in Hoffman Estates
- Soldier Field
- Evanston S.P.A.C.E., in Evanston
- Symphony Center (home to the Chicago Symphony Orchestra and Chicago Sinfonietta)
- Thalia Hall
- UIC Pavilion
- United Center
- The Vic Theater
- Woodstock Opera House, in Woodstock

Former venues included:

- Amazingrace Coffeehouse
- Avalon Regal Theater
- Central Music Hall
- Checkerboard Lounge
- Double Door
- Earl of Old Town
- The Exit
- The Fireside Bowl
- Gate of Horn
- Heartland Cafe
- Lounge Ax
- Regal Theater, Chicago
- Theresa's Lounge
- The Warehouse
- The Forum

=== Institutions ===
- Merit School of Music
- Music Institute of Chicago
- Northwestern University's Bienen School of Music, in Evanston
- Old Town School of Folk Music
- SAE Institute of Media Technology-Chicago

== See also ==
- Chicago Blues
- Chicago Blues Festival
- Chicago hardcore
- Chicago house
- Chicago record labels
- Chicago Soul
- Chicago theatre
- Culture of Chicago
- History of Chicago
- List of museums and cultural institutions in Chicago
- List of musicians from Chicago
- List of songs about Chicago
- Media in Chicago
- Music of Illinois
- Wax Trax!
