= Aadam Jacobs =

American concertgoer and archivist (b. 1967)

- Born: 1967 (age 58–59)
- Occupations: Music industry figure, archivist

Aadam Jacobs (born 1967), sometimes called Chicago Tape Guy, is a concertgoer and archivist in Chicago, Illinois, known for recording more than 10,000 tapes of indie and punk rock concerts between 1984 and the 2010s. Described as a "ubiquitous local club presence" and "rabid fan" by the Chicago Tribune, Jacobs captured an estimated 30,000 music sets from at least 3000 music acts including R.E.M., The Cure, Tracy Chapman, Depeche Mode, Sonic Youth, and Nirvana. Since late 2024, dozens of volunteers have digitized, cataloged, and published thousands of his audio files to the Aadam Jacobs Collection in the Internet Archive.

== Life and concert taping ==
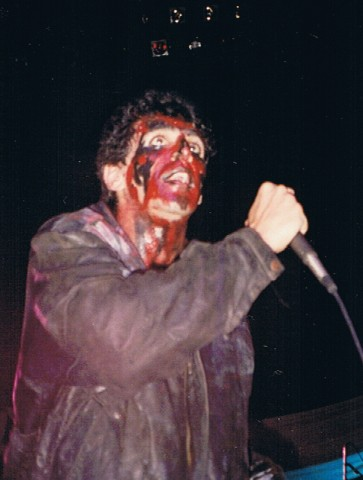
Jaz Coleman of Killing Joke performs at the Metro Chicago in 1991, when Aadam Jacobs was banned from the venue due to overzealous recording.

Aadam Jacobs was born in 1967 and raised in Evanston, Illinois. He started taping concerts as a teenager in May 1984, at age 16, after a classmate at Evanston Township High School told him it was possible to sneak a tape recorder into shows. He made his first recording at a AMM concert at the Arts Club of Chicago using a dictation device he borrowed from his grandmother.

He began to attend and record 15 concerts each month, and has said "It went pretty quickly from just being an occasional thing to something I did far too often." He also said, "It soon became difficult to enjoy a show without recording it." Jacobs rarely paid for tickets, often securing a spot on the guest list or getting let in by the doormen. He was known for his enthusiasm and persistence, winning over venue staff at West End, the Lounge Ax, the Empty Bottle, and the Metro Chicago.

Jacobs gained favor with musicians by giving them free tape recordings and offering his apartment for them to crash. Jacobs was noted for his intense dedication, sometimes biking across the city with his equipment on his back to record two concerts in the same night. "Nobody was giving me the challenge. I would just give it to myself" he later said.

Chicago Reader called him "a fixture in the local scene" in a 2004 profile. He wore his hair in long pigtails and at times showed up in outfits like a pink cocktail dress or a schoolgirl uniform. Jacobs considers himself to simply be a music fan, not an archivist, and has described himself as "that odd guy you see in the corner at every show". In the late 1980s, staff at Metro Chicago trained Jacobs in audio technology and let him plug his recording equipment into their mixing board.

In early 2004, after Jacobs presented a concert wish list to Schubas Tavern, the venue held a three-concert series in honor of his 20-year concert taping career, featuring acts that Jacobs had long taped, including Cheer-Accident, Califone and Rick Rizzo, and The Slugs.

=== Recording devices and techniques ===
Jacobs' recording techniques grew in sophistication over his three decade taping career. He used cassette tapes for about a decade, sometimes taping on two decks at once so he could give a copy to the band. His very first few recordings were on a device that his grandmother used for dictation, and he later upgraded to a Sony Walkman-like device. When it broke, for some time he resorted to bringing a backpack full of his home console cassette machine, which a sound man allowed him to plug in. In the mid 1990s, Jacobs switched to a Digital Audio Tape (DAT) recorder but did not purchase equipment to burn CD copies, instead relying on a friend to do so.

He has been praised for high sound quality given his dubious equipment. "It was super important to me to get the best sound I could with the equipment that I had, and that includes monitoring the recording too. You wouldn't believe how many people record concerts without putting headphones on but you have to if you want to know if you're doing it right. So, yeah, that's why they all sound great" Jacobs said. He kept a log of shows for some time but stopped updating it at about 3,000 volumes, after about 18 years.

=== Musical contents of his collection ===
"There’s tons of cool stuff that’ll never see the light of day ... Some of the stuff may have been demoed, but most of it only exists on my live tapes."

— Aadam Jacobs, 2004

Jacobs' full archive contains audio from more than 10,000 concerts and 3000 bands, and is noted for its early performances by rock music acts that went on to global prominence, including R.E.M., The Cure, Depeche Mode, Stereolab, The Flaming Lips, Sonic Youth, Liz Phair, and Björk. The collection is mostly indie and punk rock with occasional diversions in genre, including a 1988 hip hop concert by Boogie Down Productions. The collection contains a previously obscure 1990 Phish concert. In 1989, Jacobs used a Sony cassette recorder in his pocket to record Nirvana's first Chicago performance when they were still a little-known opening act, two years away from reaching worldwide fame with the album Nevermind. He later told the Chicago Tribune, "They were OK. They weren't great."

Much of the collection is lesser-known bands that are otherwise poorly documented. Jacobs stated, "All these great old local groups: Motorhome, Lava Sutra, the Defoliants, Joe for a Night, Friends of Betty, Toothpaste, Permabuzz, the Watchmen–bands that put out very little material in their lifetime. I think it’s great that these tapes exist. Otherwise the history would be totally lost." The Associated Press has called the archive "an internet treasure trove for music lovers".

=== Reception by music acts ===
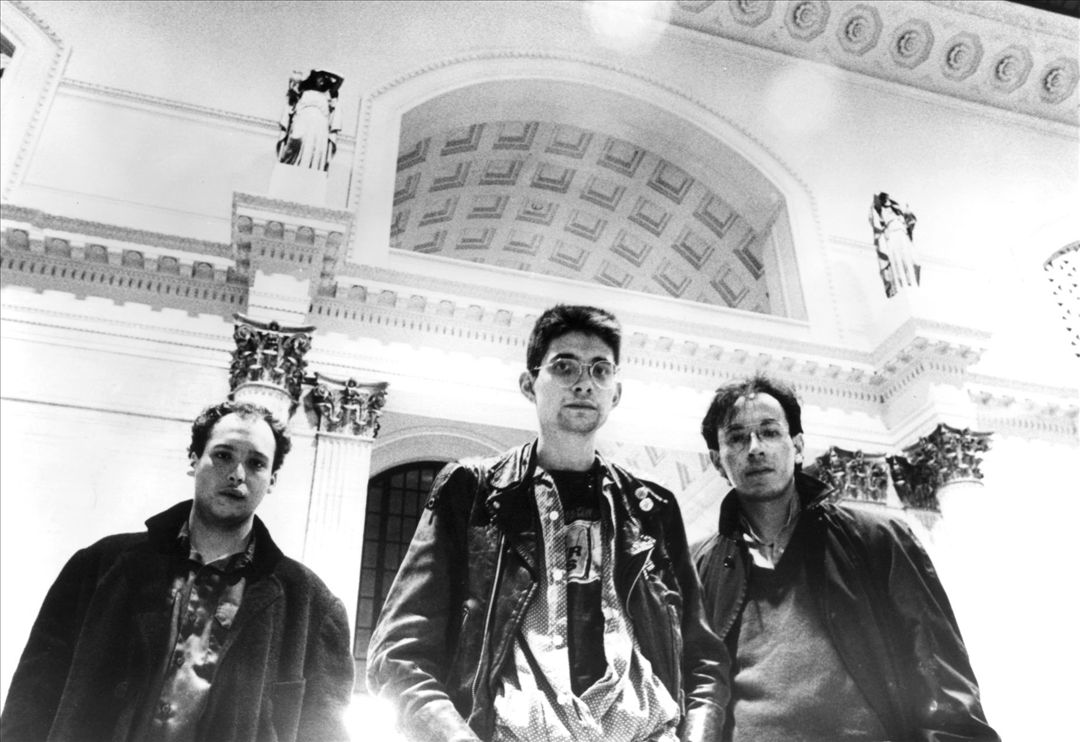
Big Black, also part of Chicago's punk rock scene, pictured in 1986

Jacobs' passion for bootleg concert tapes caused mixed reactions in the local music scene, who praised him for documenting music history but criticized him for recording artists that did not give him permission. In 1989, Jacobs snuck recording gear into a Bob Mould show at Metro after he was denied permission to record. He was caught by venue staff and banned from the premises for the next six years, until the manager of The Flaming Lips intervened. Following this incident, Jacobs kept most of his collection to himself.

Jacobs said in 2026 that most musicians are glad that his concert archives exist. Some bands, such as the Mekons, encouraged Jacobs to distribute tapes to hard-core fans, and they have licensed (or unofficially used) his tapes in official live album records. Jacobs' tape of Sonic Youth's 1987 show at Metro comprises the entirety of their album Hold That Tiger, and the band requested additional live material for bonus tracks on an expanded reissue of Daydream Nation. His audio also appears on commercial and promo releases from Wilco, Cap’n Jazz, and Built to Spill. Lou Barlow of Sebadoh gave Jacobs the opportunity to create a collection of the band's rare live tracks, though he was not motivated to act on the offer. In 2023, The Replacements released the live album Not Ready for Prime Time, which contains audio that Jacobs recorded at the band's January 1986 show at Metro Chicago mixed into the soundboard recording.

Jacobs has given his materials to bands for free, and says most musicians give acknowledgement if they use it for an official release, but not all: "Girl Trouble put out a European-only live album with a bunch of my stuff on it, and Yo La Tengo has included a couple of my tracks without crediting me" said Jacobs.

== Other pursuits ==
In the early 1990s, Jacobs founded a music label called Dead Bird, which put out singles from four bands including Red Red Meat and Trenchmouth. It shut down after four years, "It gave me a good lesson–learning I wasn’t a businessman," he says. "I thought by doing it maybe it would give me a reputation outside of being the guy who tapes live shows, but it never did."

In 2001, he put on a three-day music festival called Chicago Indie Pop Fest.

== Aadam Jacobs Collection ==
I don’t have enough life left in me to digitize everything I have ... and it’s just decaying. So before everything falls apart, it needs to be digitized. There’s no sense in me holding onto the vast majority of what I have for potential release someday. So it’s best if it gets out of my hands, so that it can live on beyond me."

— Aadam Jacobs, 2026

Jacobs struggled with what to do with his collection, saying already in 1994, "The thought of going through so many tapes… It’s really overwhelming”. In 2004 he told the Chicago Reader, "I have thoughts of it all going to the Smithsonian eventually. But I’ve done nothing to further that aim". Due to degradation of cassette tapes over time, Jacobs doubted that the material he had collected would ever be released.

In late 2024, Jacobs offered his tapes to the Internet Archive to be preserved in the site's Live Music Archive. He felt that no other organization had the infrastructure and energy to take on the project. Jacobs said he was told that his tapes would be "the largest single person’s archive" that the Internet Archive had dealt with.

On November 30, 2024, an incomplete Aadam Jacobs Collection went live online. It continues to be expanded by archivist Brian Emerick and about two dozen online volunteers who restore the audio, document the original recording equipment, and catalog song titles. In some cases volunteers consult the artists themselves to identify a concert setlist. Jacobs frequently helps fill in gaps in metadata, stating "I’m pretty much in regular contact with them—more often than my family".

The online collection contained 171 audio recordings in January 2025 and grew to more than 2300 by April 2026. Jacobs expressed little hesitation about copyright violations, telling the Associated Press, "I think that the general consensus is, it’s easier to say I’m sorry than to ask for permission". Jacobs and the Internet Archive do not profit from the collection.

== Personal life ==
Aadam Jacobs lives on the North Side of Chicago, and his collection of cassette tapes and LP records fills much of his home. He previously lived in a condo in Ukrainian Village where he filled his living room from floor to ceiling with boxes of cassettes. He later said, "My living conditions were not conducive of a sane person and I am a sane person." In 1994, he lived in a Logan Square apartment that the Chicago Tribune called "a pack rat’s treasure trove".

Jacobs insists he had no financial motive and simply loved to record concerts: "I did this because I had to do it. It was just what I had to do." He said in 2004 that he spent most of his money on blank DATs for recording.

He has expressed that his obsession with music prevented him from having a social life and caused a romantic partner to leave him: "She said 'I never see you,' because I’d been running around recording Pavement", he said. "I would rather have these recordings of Pavement’s first tour of the Midwest than have had the relationship which I really don’t remember well at all."

Though his concert attendance slowed considerably by the 2010s, he frequently listens to other people's concert tapes online, saying, "Since everybody’s got a cellphone, anybody can record a concert".

== Legacy ==
Jacobs was the subject of the 2023 documentary Melomaniac, which premiered at the Chicago Underground Film Festival and won the Audience Favorite Award. The film's director, Katlin Schneider, worked on it for four years, using a tripod and personal camera to capture interviews with figures from Chicago's 1980s and 1990s music scene, including owners of The Metro and Lounge Ax concert venues, musician Jon Langford, and former Trenchmouth drummer Fred Armisen (currently a comedian). The film ends with a focus on the fate of Jacobs' collection, which was then unknown. "I would love for people to get together and really take action to support Aadam Jacobs" said Schneider.

== See also ==
- Marion Stokes
