= Amazingrace Coffeehouse =

Coordinates: 42°03′00″N 87°40′45″W

- Grace
- Interactive map of Amazingrace Coffeehouse
- Address: Scott Hall, 601 University Place (1971–72); Shanley Hall, Colfax Street (1972–74); 845 Chicago Avenue (1974–78)
- Location: Evanston, Illinois
- Owner: Amazingrace Family
- Seating type: Floor and chairs
- Capacity: 100-400
- Type: Performance and recording venue; counterculture gathering place
- Events: Folk, jazz, country, bluegrass, newgrass, roots, blues, rock, theater, poetry

Construction
- Opened: 1971
- Closed: 1980

Website
- amazingrace.com

Amazingrace Coffeehouse (later known as Amazingrace) was an influential counterculture music and performance venue in Evanston, Illinois, during the 1970s. Run by a collective called the Amazingrace Family, it was known for its welcoming atmosphere, eclectic menu, excellent sound system, and respectful audiences. Amazingrace was the top music club in the Chicago Reader poll 1973-1975, plus Number 3 in the 1975 wrap-up of "Who's Who in Chicago's Alternative Culture". Performers from a wide variety of genres (including blues, bluegrass, folk, funk, rock, jazz, comedy, spoken word, and theater) played at Amazingrace from its beginning on the campus of Northwestern University until its final incarnation at The Main on Chicago Avenue in Evanston.

== History ==
=== Beginnings at Scott Hall ===
Amazingrace's beginning tracks with the Moratorium to End the War in Vietnam movement, and was closely associated with the cultural and political ferment of the 1960s and 1970s. Even before there was a coffeehouse, independent students were protesting the inadequacy of the gathering and food space available in Scott Hall at Northwestern University. In May 1970, participants in the Campus Strike ran a spontaneous food service to student protesters from Scott Hall, in addition to holding organizing meetings and providing music. The Strike protested the killing of four college students at Kent State and two students at Jackson State on May 4, 1970. The idea for a permanent student coffeehouse coalesced when, post-Strike, university officials finally closed the Scott Hall Grill. Students formed the Scott Hall Grill Committee, which then successfully requested permission from the Associated Student Government to run a food service, gathering, and entertainment space in the basement of 601 University Place. At the same time, these students formed a communal living situation in an empty University housing apartment on Sherman Avenue.

The coffeehouse in the basement was a hit, often selling out of lunch and packing the room for evening music. Student volunteers made daily runs to Chicago's South Water Market for fresh produce. Patrons sat on the floor at cable spool tables to eat granola, chicken soup and soy loaf. Anyone with a good recipe that could cheaply serve 400 was invited to take a turn at cooking.

Performers such as Bill Quateman and Fred Anderson came in to play, and patrons passed the hat to pay them. The as-yet unnamed venue also presented outdoor concerts, sponsored art shows, and hosted an alternative free school, whose offerings included "Street Medicine", "Alternative Structures: From Plastic Bag to Geodesic Dome", "Meher Baba", and "Computer Programming for Freaks".

The venue received its name when folk duo Norman Schwartz and Carla Reiter started ending their set with an a cappella rendition of the well-known song, "Amazing Grace". The strong audience response led Schwartz and other performers to close subsequent sets the same way, and soon the whole audience was singing what had now become the club's nightly finale. The song christened both the coffeehouse and the collective.

=== Shanley Hall ===
In the Fall of 1972 the University re-appropriated the Scott Hall basement for office space. Amazingrace moved to the larger Shanley Hall, which doubled the coffeehouse’s seating capacity to 200. Shanley Hall was built during World War II to be used as classrooms for the Navy College Training Program. Amazingrace began to book touring national acts such as Phil Ochs, David Bromberg, Mimi Fariña, Jaime Brockett, John Hartford, Norman Blake, Ry Cooder, Mike Seeger, and Vassar Clements. These touring acts were then complemented by local opening acts and headliners such as Luther Allison, Claudia Schmidt, Tom Dundee, Bonnie Koloc and Redwood Landing.

In addition to Shanley Hall, Amazingrace also had access to larger campus venues such as the 1200+-seat Cahn Auditorium and the 8000-seat McGaw Hall (now Welsh-Ryan Arena). Here it presented shows by Taj Mahal, Leo Kottke, John Fahey, John Prine, Commander Cody and His Lost Planet Airmen, John McLaughlin and the Mahavishnu Orchestra, Steve Goodman, and The Grateful Dead.

The Grateful Dead concert at McGaw is well remembered for two reasons. First, the band took an unusually long set break of close to an hour. The second notable element was the startling visual of numerous silk parachutes strung across the vast ceiling. The silks were part of a plan that the band and Amazingrace created to "improve" the acoustics and visuals of the hall, which is built like an airplane hangar. While the famous Dead "wall of sound" did not formally debut until March 1974 at the Cow Palace in San Francisco, many of its elements were already being used at this concert, including McIntosh 2300 and 3500 amplifiers, noise-canceling vocal mics, and plentiful JBL drivers. Despite complaints about the delays, the consensus of reviewers was that the sound and set list were amazing.

Despite these larger productions, Amazingrace maintained its coffeehouse tradition of broad cultural programming and community participation. It developed its own ticketing system, designed and printed its own posters, and cooked lunch and dinner for its patrons and performers. Amazingrace hosted poetry readings, anti-war rallies, films, and photography shows. It also continued to invite guest cooks into the kitchen. The kitchen served as an informal green room for the musicians, with the exception of the preeminent American folk musician Odetta. For Odetta, the women's bathroom was commandeered as a true dressing room, and the men's toilet became unisex for the duration of each of her engagements.

"The ambiance was very special there," recalled Bob Gibson, who recorded live at Amazingrace. "We knew it would be really high energy performing."

Success brought Amazingrace increased visibility, and with that increased visibility came two significant problems. The first problem was Amazingrace’s status as a University organization. By 1974 most member of the Amazingrace collective were no longer students. They had either graduated or dropped out due to the demands of running the club. The University was uncomfortable with their continuing use of its grounds and facilities. In addition, Amazingrace's loose policies regarding "bring your own" beer and marijuana led University President Robert Strotz to worry about "a situation that would lead to the place being busted". Then, on November 6, 1973, the City of Evanston added additional pressure when it warned the University that by allowing Amazingrace to carry on, Northwestern was in violation of a zoning regulation that prohibited commercial business operations on University-owned land.

Amazingrace's second big problem during this time was also with the city of Evanston, but this issue involved the group's new communal living situation at Colfax Street in Evanston. A dozen people resided at Colfax Street, in addition to the frequent touring musicians, poets, and yippies who could always find a meal and a bed in the basement. This style of occupancy put the house in violation of the Evanston exclusionary zoning ordinance that disallowed more than three unrelated people living together. In response, Amazingrace partnered with the Evanston chapter of the American Civil Liberties Union (ACLU) to challenge the ordinance. However, both parties agreed to drop the effort in April 1974, when the Supreme Court of the United States upheld the constitutionality of this type of ordinance in the similar case of Village of Belle Terre v. Boraas.

=== The Main and Amazingrace West ===
In late 1974, after years of disagreement and conflict with both Northwestern and the City of Evanston, Amazingrace severed ties with Northwestern, moved out of Colfax Street, and fragmented as a group. Several members went off to new ventures outside of the music business. Five members headed west to Eugene, Oregon, where they lived and worked for the next two years as Amazingrace "West," producing and promoting shows by Mimi Fariña, Bryan Bowers, John Prine, Sam Leopold, and Turkey Run. They also worked with Eugene's W.O.W. Hall, supplying sound equipment and bookings assistance.

Six members stayed in Evanston. They took over a small 4-unit apartment building on Crain Street in Evanston, thereby adhering to the city's occupancy regulations. They partnered with Evanston architect Ed Noonan to create the next incarnation of Amazingrace at The Main, Noonan’s new mixed-use development at 845 Chicago Avenue in Evanston.

Amazingrace was now located much closer to Chicago, and was right across the street from a Chicago Transit Authority "El" train station. The new venue was 3297 square feet. It had neither kitchen facilities for food service nor a liquor license, but its good location, reasonable prices ($2.50-$3.50 admission for one of the two nightly sets), "non-nightclub" atmosphere, and "all-ages welcome" policy grew the audience. With 16-foot high acoustical ceilings and a wrap-around balcony, Amazingrace at The Main could accommodate almost 400 patrons, most of whom sat on the carpeted floor. The sound system featured Electro-Voice Sentry III studio monitor speakers, Dynaco Stereo 400 amplifiers, an Allen & Heath soundboard, and Amazingrace’s own house-brand Earworks 24-band graphic equalizer. A Colortran lightboard and theatrical-quality lighting instruments complemented the sound system and heightened the performance experience. Reviewers noted that performers got "a warm reception...enhanced by the open, relaxed atmosphere of the two-tiered club and the clean, open amplification."

Live and recorded concert broadcasts on radio stations continued to be a staple, as they had at Shanley Hall. The Midnight Special, a popular folk program on Chicago's fine arts station WFMT-FM, frequently featured Amazingrace shows, as did rock station WXRT-FM and Northwestern University station WNUR-FM.

During this period the booking roster expanded to include more jazz. Established masters Sonny Rollins, Charles Mingus, Eddie Harris and McCoy Tyner played repeat engagements. Rollins came out of retirement to play the venue; the jazz great Bill Evans played there as well. Amazingrace also became the go-to venue for the next generation of upcoming jazz artists, including pianist Keith Jarrett, the Paul Winter Consort, Anthony Braxton, Jack DeJohnette, Simon & Bard, Miroslav Vitouš, Oregon, vibraphonist Gary Burton, bassist Steve Swallow, drummer Bob Moses and guitarist Pat Metheny. Avant-garde jazz artists such as Fred Anderson, Sun Ra, Douglas Ewart and Billy Brimfield performed there frequently.

In addition to jazz, the total range of presentations also grew. Amazingrace hosted national acts from the folk, country, blues, funk, soul, rock, swing, and bluegrass traditions. Randy Newman, The Persuasions, Jimmy Buffett, New Grass Revival, Tom Rush, Emmylou Harris, Jerry Jeff Walker, Fairport Convention with Sandy Denny, Doc Watson and Merle Watson, Mary Travers, Terry Callier and John Hiatt played there.

Relationships with performers were personal. For example, when Steve Goodman needed money to purchase a house, he called Amazingrace and asked if they could quickly book him in. The four resulting sold-out shows became known as the "Let's Buy Steve a House" gig. Shortly afterwards, when the washing machine at Crain Street broke down, Goodman had his road manager Steve Cohen buy the collective a new one. "That," says Cohen, "was the Steve Goodman Memorial Washing Machine."

Continuing the coffeehouse tradition established at Scott and Shanley Halls, Amazingrace at The Main also presented film, lecture, theater, comedy and poetry. Steve Martin played his first Chicago-area comedy shows at Amazingrace. Henny Youngman and Proctor and Bergman of the Firesign Theatre played to sold-out shows. Charles Bukowski, Anne Waldman, and US Poet Laureate Mark Strand appeared as part of the No Mountains Poetry Project readings and broadsides series. Allen Ginsberg read in a benefit performance for Rangjung Rigpe Dorje, the 16th Gyalwa Karmapa.

In 1976 the Piven Theatre Workshop chose Amazingrace as the rehearsal and performance space for its unique combination of story-telling and improvisational theatre. This allowed Amazingrace to host the first performances of those who would become the next generation of Chicago actors. Performers at that time included Jeremy Piven, John Cusack, Rosanna Arquette, Aidan Quinn, Lili Taylor, and Joan Cusack.

Once again, however, Amazingrace's popularity, artistic success, and commitment to low prices for the community came at a cost. Finances were a challenge. The collective members needed day jobs to help cover their own living expenses. Lack of liquor and food sale income made it hard to have sufficient cash flow to pay rent, electricity, advertising, and performers. Additional pressure came from the ever-increasing common maintenance charges and heating bills that Heil, Heil, Smart & Golee (The Main’s management firm) imposed. In 1978 Amazingrace was late on a rent payment, but was able to negotiate a settlement with Heil, Heil, Smart & Golee. Despite meeting the terms of the settlement, the management firm subsequently ordered Amazingrace to leave The Main. Citing high costs and unresponsive management, several other stores left during the same time.

Amazingrace at The Main put on its last show on July 31, 1978, in a raucous 4-day weekend featuring Jim Post, Corky Siegel, Tom Dundee, and Steve Goodman, with fans, musicians, and former collective members attending from all over the country. The final song, sung from the stage with audience participation, was “Amazing Grace.”

The Evanston members continued on as Amazingrace and produced several shows in other local venues such as the Varsity Theater and Pick-Staiger Concert Hall through the early 1980s.

== Legacy ==
Although the last venue owned by Amazingrace closed in 1978, its legacy and influence survive. FitzGerald’s Nightclub, The Morse Theater Project, and Evanston S.P.A.C.E. all cite Amazingrace as their model and inspiration.

Amazingrace Reunions are held semi-regularly. The first was in 1988 at Shanley Hall in Evanston. The 2004 reunion was at Centre East in Skokie, Illinois and featured Redwood Landing and Bonnie Koloc. In 2011 there was a full-week, multi-site 40th anniversary celebration at Northwestern University Library, the Old Town School of Folk Music in Chicago, and Evanston S.P.A.C.E. Live concerts included the Siegel-Schwall Band with Jim Schwall, Rollo Radford, Corky Siegel and Sam Lay; Megon McDonough; Bonnie Koloc, and Johnny Burns with Paul Nebenzahl.
