= Robert Wolf (writer) =

American writer (born 1944)

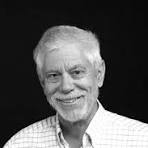
Robert Wolf

Robert Wolf (born 1944) is an American writer, journalist, and entrepreneur. His non-fiction writing focuses on everyday life, frequently that of farmers and other rural Americans.

== Award ==
Wolf is past recipient of the Bronze Medal for radio commentary and the Sigma Delta Chi Award, both from the Society of Professional Journalists.

== Personal life ==
Robert Wolf spent his formative years wandering the United States, searching for the "American Soul." As an adolescent his goal was to "work every job in the country, live in every town and city and have conversations with everyone."During the 1960s and 70s, Wolf hitchhiked and rode freight trains across country, while seeking out iconic American types. Poets & Writers wrote "he was a ranch hand in New Mexico, a journalist in Chicago, a teacher in an inner-city Brooklyn school and at a penitentiary, as well as a doctoral candidate in philosophy, a dabbler in art, a hitchhiker and hobo."

== Career ==
By 1987, having settled in Chicago, Wolf wrote a weekly column and features for the Chicago Tribune. In 1988 he married singer and artist Bonnie Koloc and the couple moved to Nashville, where Wolf organized a writing workshop for the homeless. In 1990, Wolf, along with Steven Meinbresse, established Free River Press, a 501(c)(3) nonprofit. Initially intended as a publishing vehicle for the homeless, Wolf expanded the press's mission to "create a collective autobiography of America."

When Wolf and Koloc moved to rural Iowa, Wolf began running writing workshops for neighboring farmers. The workshop resulted in three books published by Free River Press. Since then Wolf has conducted workshops not only throughout the Midwest, but in the Mississippi Delta, the Southwest, and in New York and Chicago.

In 1999, Oxford University Press published An American Mosaic: Prose and Poetry by Everyday Folk, selected from the first nine years of Free River Press writings.

His early Iowa experiences led Wolf to begin writing about the ongoing farm and rural crisis and to begin, in 1994, writing about the need for rural America to develop self-reliant, decentralized regional economies.

Free River Press publications have appeared on CBS News Sunday Morning as well as NPR's All Things Considered and Morning Edition. Since 2010 Wolf has produced a weekly radio program for Free River Press, American Mosaic, airing on community stations in a dozen states.

== Education ==
Wolf obtained his degrees from Columbia University and the University of Chicago.

== Bibliography ==
- The Great Wheel, Squeeze Press, 2025, [9]
- Building the Agricultural City, Ruskin Press, 2018, [8]
- The Triumph of Technique: The Industrialization of Agriculture and the Destruction of Rural America(2004)
- An American Mosaic: Prose and Poetry by Everyday Folk, 1999
- Jump Start: How to Write from Everyday Life Oxford University Press, 2001.
- Story Jazz: A History of Chicago Jazz Styles, 1994
- Crazeology: The Autobiography of a Chicago Jazzman (by Bud Freeman as told to Wolf), 1995
- Driftless Dreams, a play. Ruskin Press, 2007.
- Iowa: Living in the Third World, published in The Des Moines Register on July 16, 1995.

== Other sources ==
- Wolf, Robert. "A Search for America", Journal of Rural Mental Health, February 6, 2008.
- Wolf, Robert. "In Search of America"
- Anderson, Greta. "Free River Press: Giving Voice to the Forgotten", Poets & B Writers, November/December 1999
- Kogan, Rick. "Of Quiet Lives", Chicago Tribune, September 12, 1999.
- Meyers, Rebecca. "Empowering the Human Spirit through Reading and Writing", A.B. Bookman's weekly, September 1993.
- Marshall, Brenda. "Voice for the Homeless", The Progressive, August 1991.
