= Thalia Hall (Chicago) =

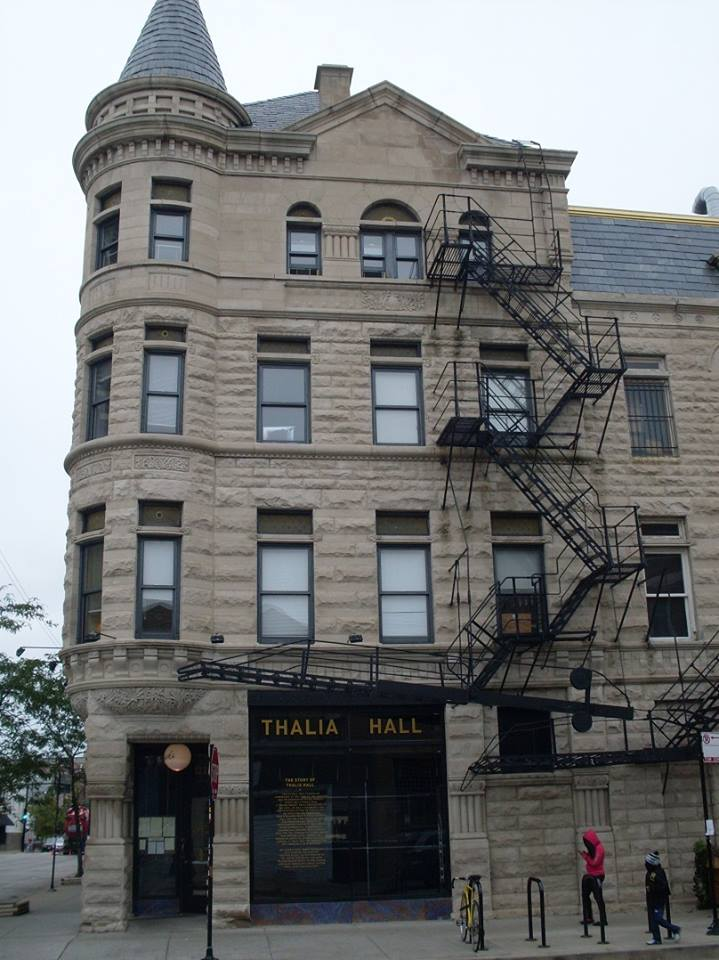
- Interactive map of the Thalia Hall area

General information
- Type: Theatre
- Architectural style: Romanesque Revival
- Location: Pilsen, Chicago, Illinois, U.S.
- Coordinates: 41.8577°N 87.6574°W
- Completed: 1892

Design and construction
- Architects: Frederick Faber and William Pagels

Website
- www.thaliahallchicago.com

Thalia Hall is a historic building in Pilsen, Chicago, which is a mixed-use music, retail, and bar/restaurant space. It was designated as a Chicago Landmark on October 25, 1989.

Thalia Hall was built in 1892 by saloonkeeper John Dusek, and designed by architects Frederick Faber and William Pagels in the Romanesque Revival style.

Its current owners/operators are Bruce Finkelman and Craig Golden through their firm 16” on Center, through which they own, co-own, operate, and/or co-operate several music venues, including Empty Bottle, The Promontory, Evanston S.P.A.C.E., Sonotheque (which closed in 2009), Thalia Hall, and The Salt Shed, all in and near Chicago.) Finkelman and Golden are similarly affiliated with several other restaurants and bars, both at those music venues and free-standing, including Bite Cafe, Dusek's, and Longman & Eagle.
