= The Triumph of Technique =

2004 book by Robert Wolf

The Triumph of Technique: The Industrialization of Agriculture and the Destruction of Rural America is a 2004 book by Robert Wolf.

The Triumph of Technique examines contemporary agriculture and its impact on rural economies. The "technique" of the title refers not only to technologies but to any methods developed for the purpose of achieving predetermined ends. Wolf argues that technique, as he defines it, has taken the art out of farming by transforming it into agribusiness, on a much larger scale. He claims that this transformation has led to the decline of rural communities.
