= An American Mosaic: Prose and Poetry by Everyday Folk =

1999 anthology

- Author: Robert Wolf (editor)
- Language: English
- Genre: Anthology
- Publisher: Oxford University Press
- Publication date: 1999
- Publication place: United States
- Media type: Print (hardcover)
- ISBN: 9780195132649

An American Mosaic: Prose and Poetry by Everyday Folk is an anthology of writings by people without literary ambition that were developed in the first nine years of Free River writing workshops. Published in 1999 by Oxford University Press, the collection contains prose and poetry of the homeless, short essays and stories by Midwestern and Mississippi Delta farm families, by small town residents of vanishing rural America, and by men who make their living on the Mississippi River.

Inspired by America Today, Thomas Hart Benton’s 1932 panorama of the United States, An American Mosaic explores America from the point of those whose stories are seldom heard. The editor, Robert Wolf, connects these panels with interpretive essays on contemporary America.

As a reviewer for Kirkus Reviews wrote: "Wolf hears America singing by recording poems and essays by the homeless, farmers, commune inhabitants, and residents of small river towns, the most common and least represented element in our urban, urbane culture. What weaves these pieces together is a sense of sadness and nostalgia because a way of life is disappearing. Wolf sees the rapid technological advances of the past few decades as increasingly dehumanizing. Jettisoned in its wake, he theorizes, are the thousands of mentally ill homeless, the newly unemployed and impoverished, the low-tech and depressed small-town dwellers, and the abandoned company ghosts of the manufacturing era. Local education has failed in the misery belt ‘because those driving this society are, as a class, anti-intellectual and unimaginative.' These elegiac themes dominate."
