= West End (club) =

Former rock club in Chicago, Illinois

Coordinates: 41°55′4.4″N 87°39′28.7″W

West End was a small rock club in the Lincoln Park neighborhood of Chicago, Illinois, that operated during the mid-1980s. The club stood near West Armitage and North Racine avenues; a 2011 retrospective identified its former site as 1170 West Armitage Avenue, later occupied by a dental office. It hosted punk and power pop performers and became a gathering place for the city's mod scene.

== History ==
Susan Rae Miller Tweedy worked at West End from 1984 until its closure, which she recalled as occurring in 1987. She initially managed the bar and later became its booking agent when the previous booker moved to The Vic Theatre. Miller recalled that the Replacements were among the acts she booked there. During this period, she also allowed teenage concert taper Aadam Jacobs to record performances at the club.

Performance footage for Savage Beliefs: The Movie, completed in fall 1984, was filmed at West End with Naked Raygun as the opening band.

After West End closed, Miller booked at the Cubby Bear and joined Lounge Ax as a partner in 1989. A State of Illinois music-history exhibition later characterized West End as a precursor to Lounge Ax.
