= Tom Dundee =

American singer-songwriter

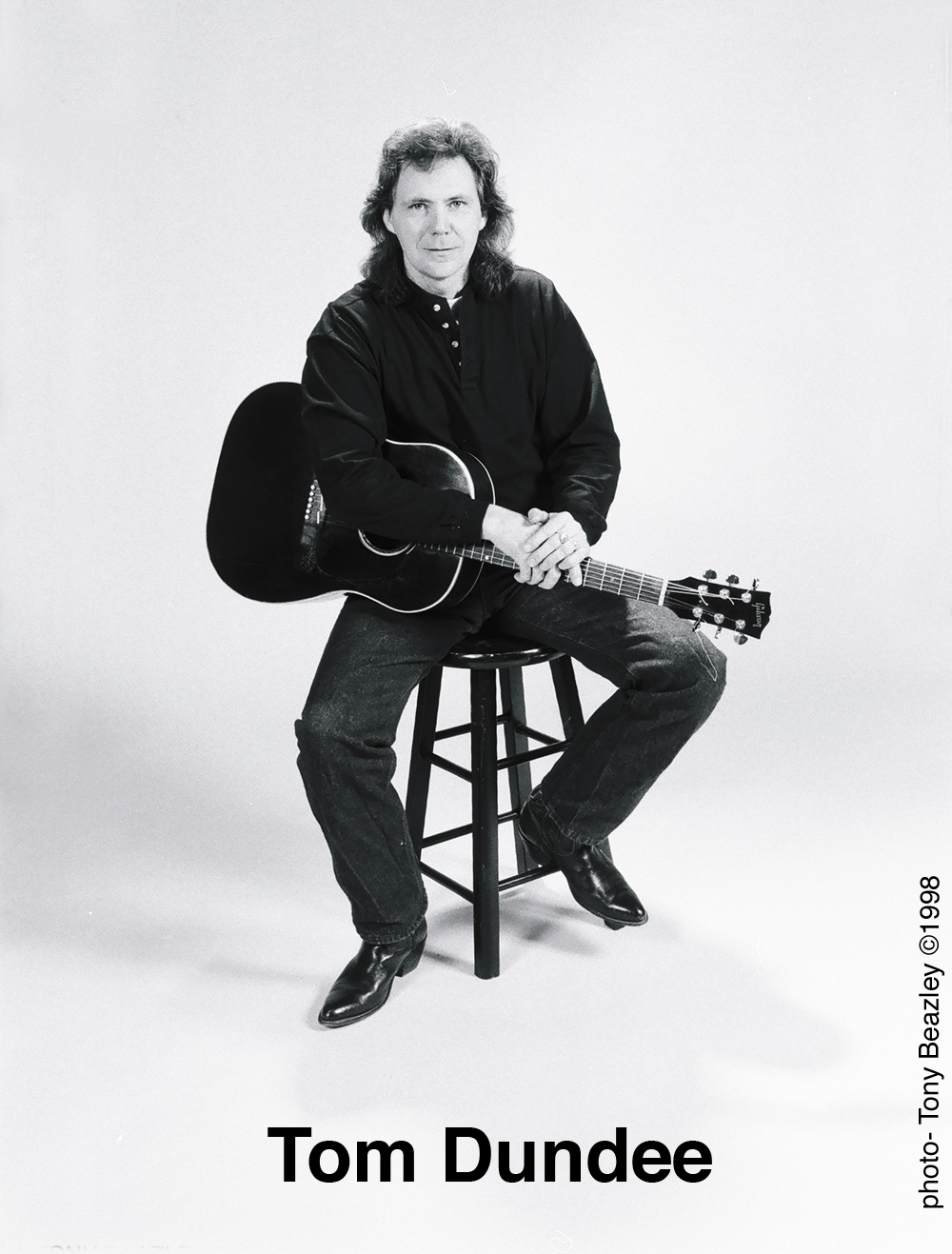
Tom Dundee

Tom Dundee (1946–2006) was a singer/songwriter born in Chicago, Illinois, United States as Tom Callinan

He began his career in Corrales, New Mexico in 1969. A year later he became a principal member of the Chicago folk scene that spawned such performers as John Prine, Steve Goodman, Mick Scott, and Bonnie Koloc. In the 1980s, Dundee performed throughout the Seattle Music Scene and in the 1990s recorded out of Nashville, Tennessee.

Dundee is best known for his song "A Delicate Balance." He composed over 300 songs, and recorded with such notables as Timothy B. Schmit, Stephanie Davis, Rita Coolidge and Paul Barrere. Tom was a close friend and protégé of Steve Goodman, who gave him the guitar on which Steve had composed "The City of New Orleans." According to the Chicago Sun-Times obituary of April 20, 2006, "At the time of his death, Mr. Dundee was a linchpin of the 1970s Chicago folk boom that produced John Prine, Steve Goodman, Bonnie Koloc and Jim Post, who covered 'A Delicate Balance.'"

In concert, Dundee delighted in taking chances with his audience, letting the spontaneity of the moment shape the personality of his show every time out. He joked with his audience, drew them out of themselves with his music, and wove stories in and out of his songs. As a result, his shows, which typically included some of the oldest chestnuts imaginable as well as Dundee's own compositions, almost always felt fresh.

He died in the Chicago, Illinois neighborhood of Rogers Park on April 18, 2006, from injuries suffered in a motorcycle accident.

== Discography ==
- A Delicate Balance
- Right Lane Man
- Roadmap
- Rough Around the Edge
- Lyfe Tyme Arhyme
- Tom Dundee
