= Free River Press =

Free River Press is a nonprofit publishing house founded in Nashville, Tennessee, whose mission is to develop a literary mosaic of Americana as written by people from all walks of life. It pursues this goal by conducting writing workshops in farmhouse dining rooms, homeless shelters, small town libraries, senior centers, urban churches and foundations. Its goal is to amass a collection of writings that will eventually resemble a collective American autobiography.

== History ==
Free River Press was founded in Nashville in 1990 by writer Robert Wolf and Steven Meinbresse, former Coordinator of Tennessee's Department of Homeless Services. The press grew out of a writing workshop Wolf conducted at a Nashville homeless shelter between 1989 and 1991.

For one year during this period, Free River Press ran a Great Books seminar funded by the Tennessee Humanities Council. The seminar mixed homeless and non-homeless participants.

By 1991 Free River Press had published six slim volumes by the homeless, including Five Street Poets and Passing Thru. In 1991, Wolf moved to rural Iowa and began a writing workshop with neighboring farmers. Their writings were issued in three books, Voices From the Land, Simple Times, and More Voices From the Land.

During the time he worked with Iowa farmers, Wolf was also traveling to Tennessee to conduct writing workshops there. Subsequently, Free River Press published two memoirs by Tennessee farmers. Wolf later conducted a workshop in Helena, Arkansas and workshops in small Midwestern towns, as well as in New Jersey, New York City, Chicago, Texas, and Santa Fe, New Mexico.

In 1999, Oxford University Press published a sampling from the first nine years of Free River Press books, An American Mosaic: Prose and Poetry by Everyday Folk.

In 2009, Free River Press published a second edition of Heartland Portrait: Stories From the Rural Midwest, a large anthology incorporating 18 years of writings developed in workshops in Iowa, Wisconsin, and Minnesota.

== Workshop ==
The Free River Press writing workshop was designed with the amateur in mind. They are unique in that the writing technique is orally-oriented; participants tell their stories before writing them. They are then asked to write their stories as closely as possible to the way they told them, in the style of their storytelling.

== Award ==
In 2006 Free River Press won the Heritage Publication Award for publication from the State of New Mexico for its anthology Ayer Y Ahora: Stories From Santa Fe and Northern New Mexico. This anthology included stories by those who grew up in agricultural mountain villages.

== See also ==
- Literature of Tennessee
