= Empty Bottle =

Chicago music venue and bar

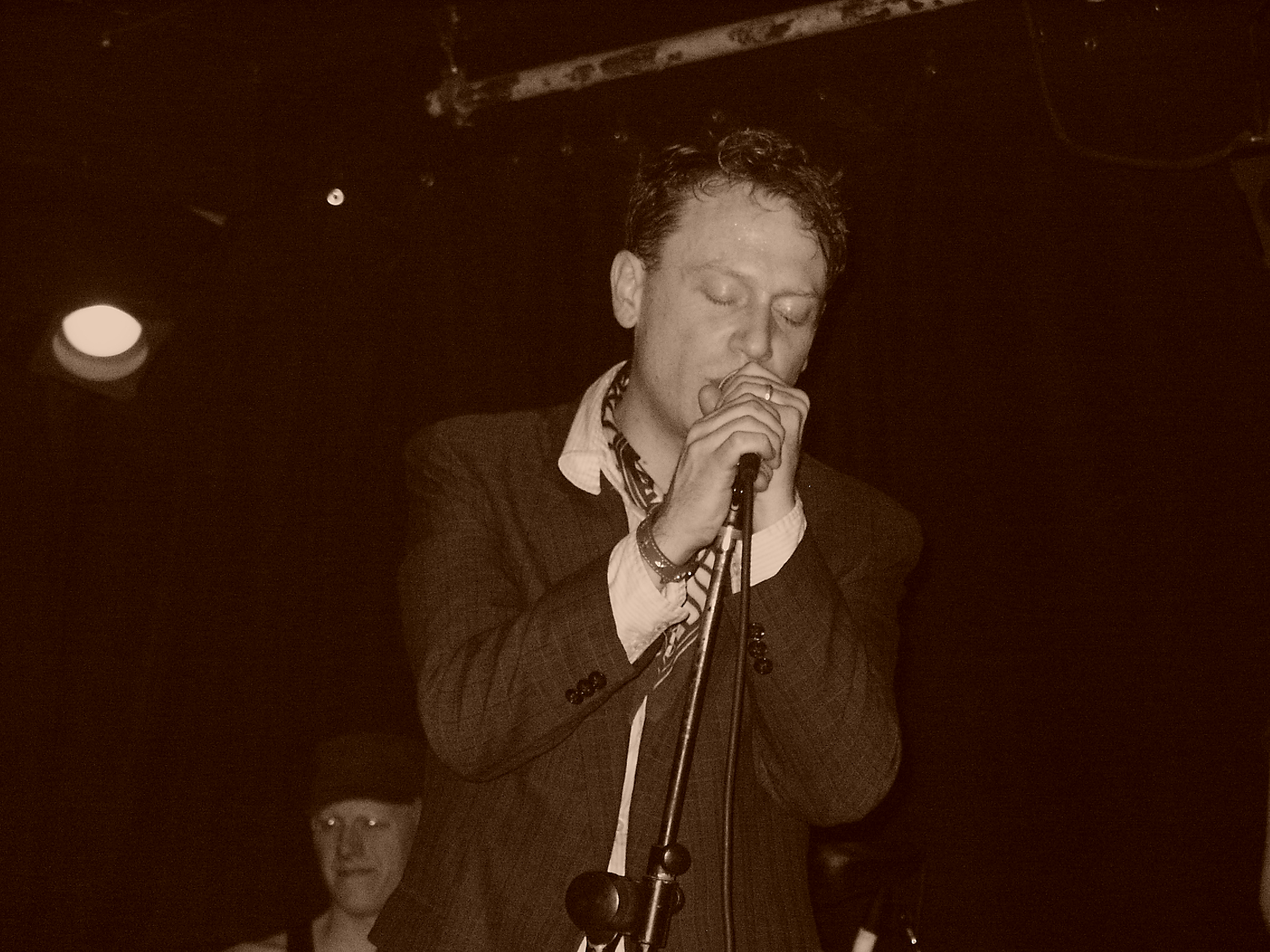
- Torquil Campbell performing at Empty Bottle in 2005
- Interactive map of Empty Bottle
- Address: 1035 N. Western Avenue
- Location: Chicago, Illinois, United States
- Coordinates: 41.9004°N 87.6866°W
- Owner: Bruce Finkelman
- Capacity: 400
- Type: Music venue, bar

Construction
- Opened: 1992

Website
- emptybottle.com

Empty Bottle is an independent music venue and bar at 1035 North Western Avenue in the Ukrainian Village neighborhood of Chicago, Illinois. Bruce Finkelman founded the business in 1992 and moved it to its present location in 1993. The 400-capacity club became a hub for underground rock, post-punk, experimental music, and other independent scenes during the 1990s.

Empty Bottle is part of the Chicago hospitality and entertainment group 16" on Center. The venue's programming has combined local performers with touring acts, recurring free concerts, and jazz and improvised-music residencies. It has also participated in advocacy for independently owned music venues.

== History ==
Finkelman conceived the venue while studying at the University of Missouri and working at the Blue Note club in Columbia, Missouri. In 1992, he opened the original Empty Bottle near Western Avenue and Walton Street with less than $1,000. The landlord objected after the bar hosted its first live performance, and the business moved several blocks north. The current venue, at Western Avenue and Cortez Street, opened on October 30, 1993.

During the 1990s, Empty Bottle was part of a group of Chicago clubs that included Metro, Lounge Ax, and the Fireside Bowl. These venues provided stages for local and touring underground bands as alternative rock expanded into the mainstream. Empty Bottle supported developing Chicago alternative country and post-rock scenes and presented early appearances by artists including Veruca Salt, The White Stripes, Yeah Yeah Yeahs, and LCD Soundsystem. It also hosted performers such as The Flaming Lips, Uncle Tupelo, Wilco, Neutral Milk Hotel, and Yo La Tengo. The venue's first decade was also associated with post-punk and experimental music, and saxophonist Ken Vandermark held a multi-year weekly residency there.

The club marked its 25th anniversary in 2017 with a series of concerts featuring returning performers. By that time, it had remained at the same location for nearly its entire history despite the closure of several other clubs associated with Chicago's 1990s independent-music scene.

The COVID-19 pandemic forced Empty Bottle to close for nearly a year. During the shutdown, Finkelman and chef Noah Sandoval replaced the adjacent Bite Cafe with Pizza Friendly Pizza, a joint venture designed around takeout and outdoor service that opened in July 2020. Empty Bottle reopened as a bar on March 3, 2021, before it was considered safe to resume concerts.

In January 2024, managing partner Matt Ciarleglio and talent buyer Molly Mobley introduced Nothing/Assumed, a concert series designed for musicians and audience members in recovery or those who chose not to drink. The bar remained open during the events but added nonalcoholic cocktails and beers, while performers could request dry backstage areas. Empty Bottle celebrated its 33⅓ anniversary in late 2025 with an eleven-show program. The anniversary referred to the playback speed of a long-playing record and included local and touring artists as well as a release drawn from the venue's jazz and improvised-music archive.

== Programming and recordings ==
Empty Bottle books rock, punk, metal, hip-hop, electronic, jazz, and experimental performers. Its long-running Free Monday series removes the cover charge for selected shows and has been used to introduce local and touring artists to new audiences. The venue also organizes Music Frozen Dancing, a free annual outdoor winter concert held outside the club.

In 2012, the venue issued Live at the Empty Bottle, a compilation of recordings made at the club. The collection surveyed contemporary garage rock and pop and included performances by Best Coast, Ty Segall, Black Lips, Crystal Stilts, Shannon and the Clams, and other acts. It was released digitally and on vinyl, while recordings of additional sets were made available through the venue's Bandcamp page.

== Industry and community role ==
Finkelman later co-founded 16" on Center with Craig Golden. Empty Bottle served as a starting point for the group's development and operation of other Chicago-area venues. The group's venue portfolio has included The Promontory, SPACE in Evanston, Sonotheque (which closed in 2009), Thalia Hall in Pilsen, and The Salt Shed in West Town. The group has also been affiliated with restaurants and bars at those venues and elsewhere, including Bite Cafe, Dusek's, and Longman & Eagle. As of 2024, WBEZ described Empty Bottle as a comparatively low-cost, 400-person club with frequent concerts and a loyal repeat audience.

In 2018, Empty Bottle joined owners of Metro, Schubas Tavern, Lincoln Hall, the Hideout, and other clubs in forming the Chicago Independent Venue League (CIVL). The organization sought a role for independent venues in negotiations over the proposed Lincoln Yards development, which was expected to include several concert halls operated by Live Nation. CIVL later helped channel support to local venues threatened with closure during the pandemic.

== Publications and venue culture ==
The Empty Bottle Chicago: 21+ Years of Music / Friendly / Dancing, a 200-page oral history edited by John E. Dugan, was published by Curbside Splendor in 2016. It included an introduction by John Darnielle and recollections from musicians, employees, and patrons. The book documented the club's role in 1990s Chicago music and its support for performers working outside the mainstream.

Resident cats have been part of the venue's identity. Radley lived at Empty Bottle for approximately sixteen years before his death in 2009, becoming familiar to performers and patrons. Staff adopted another resident cat, Peg, when the bar reopened in 2021.
