= Journal of Rural Mental Health =

- Discipline: Rural Health
- Language: English
- Edited by: James L. Werth, Jr. (outgoing), Timothy G. Heckman (incoming)

Publication details
- History: 1977-present
- Publisher: American Psychological Association on behalf of the National Association for Rural Mental Health (United States)
- Frequency: Quarterly

Standard abbreviations
- ISO 4: J. Rural Ment. Health

Indexing
- ISSN: 1935-942X (print); 2163-8969 (web)
- LCCN: 2007215076
- OCLC no.: 754216857

Links
- Journal homepage; Online archive

The Journal of Rural Mental Health is a biannual peer-reviewed academic journal published by the American Psychological Association on behalf of the National Association for Rural Mental Health. It covers rural mental health research, practice, and policy. It was established in 1977 and the editor-in-chief is James L. Werth Jr. (Stone Mountain Health Services).

== Abstracting and indexing ==
The journal is abstracted and indexed in PsycINFO.
