= The Loneliest Monk =

US musical group

- Origin: Chicago, Illinois
- Genres: Art rock, psychedelic rock
- Years active: 2008–2011
- Label: Kilo Records
- Members: Michelle Morales; Benjamin Miles
- Website: www.wearetheloneliestmonk.com

The Loneliest Monk is an experimental rock duo from Chicago, Illinois USA.

== History ==
In 2010 the band released their LP "The Loneliest Monk" on Chicago independent label Kilo Records to positive reviews by critics and fans. The duo has been on the road with this LP since March 2010, including two west coast tours and one east coast stint. Kilo Records collaborated with HYSTK and Rubbish Films to make a video for their single "The Ghost and the Silhouette", which also received a lot of positive attention.

== Discography ==
Year	Date	Title	Label
2010	March 1	The Loneliest Monk	Kilo Records
