= Evanston S.P.A.C.E. =

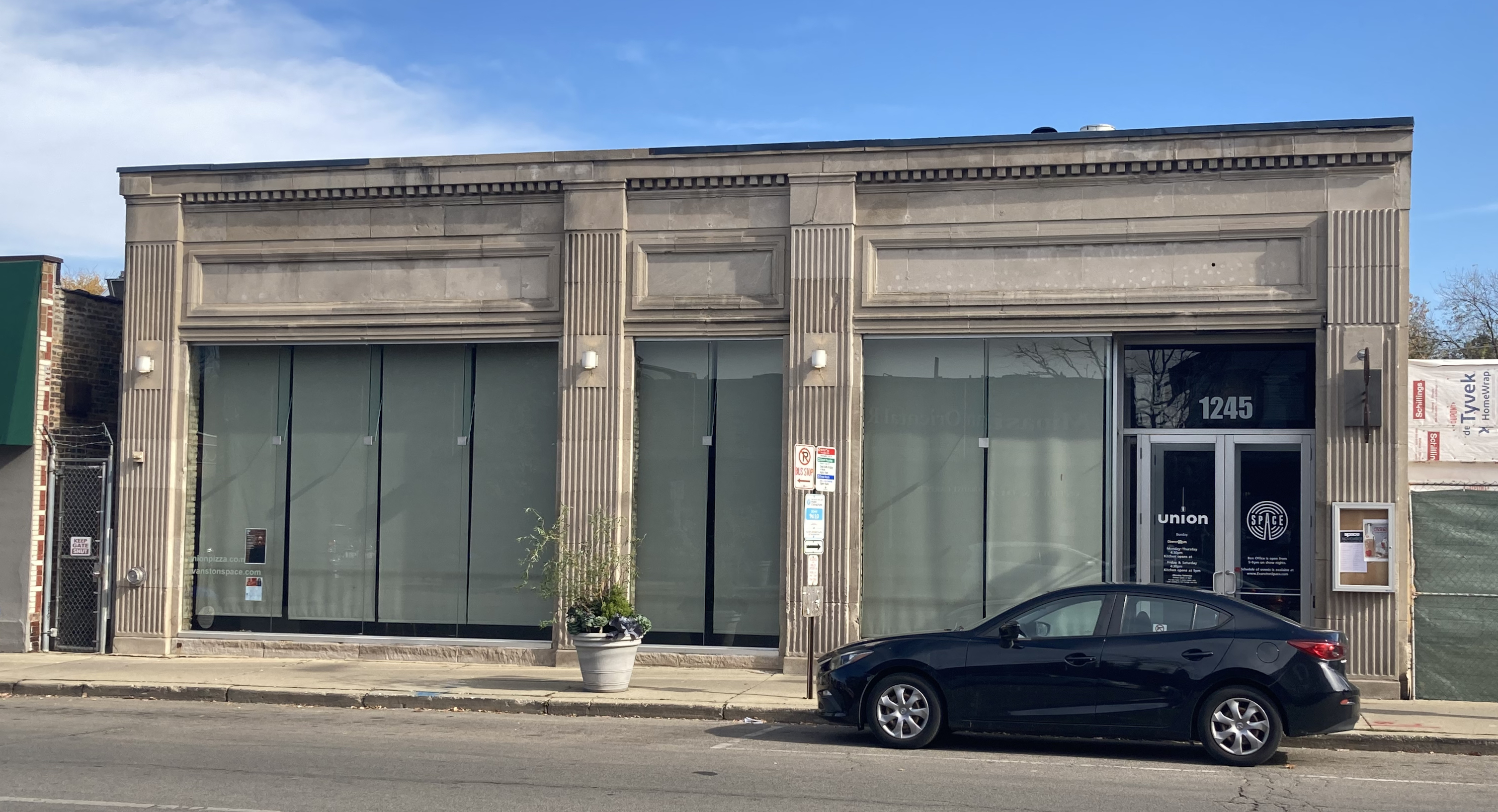
- Interactive map of Evanston S.P.A.C.E.
- Address: 1243 Chicago Avenue
- Location: Evanston, Illinois
- Coordinates: 42.04089°N 87.68034°W
- Seating type: café, small round tables, candle-lit
- Capacity: 250 - 400
- Type: small folk concert venue, music and music podcast production facility, visual arts and literary events meeting space, bar+café

Construction
- Opened: 2008

Website
- evanstonspacemusic.com

Evanston S.P.A.C.E. (or Evanston SPACE) is a small concert hall and venue for music performance and live recording, and a podcast production facility, as well as serves similarly for the visual arts and literary events located at 1243 Chicago Avenue in Evanston, Illinois, adjacent to Chicago, in close proximity to the CTA Purple Line mass transit elevated train station Dempster, just south of Dempster Avenue. It opened in spring 2008, along with Union Pizzeria, an affiliated restaurant in the same building.

It is a notable small concert space in the Chicago area, that seats about 250 people at candle-lit small round tables and as standing spectators. The SPACE has over the years played host to the most renowned folk music artists in the Western World; for example, only in 2014–2015 winter timeframe to Suzanne Vega, Leo Kottke, Justin Townes Earle and Robyn Hitchcock, among many tens of events.

S.P.A.C.E. is an acronym for the Society for the Preservation of Art and Culture in Evanston. As of 2024, Bruce Finkelman and Craig Golden, through their firm 16” on Center, own, co-own, operate, and/or co-operate several music venues, including The Empty Bottle, The Promontory, Evanston S.P.A.C.E., Sonotheque (which closed in 2009), Thalia Hall, and The Salt Shed, all in and near Chicago. Finkeleman and Golden are similarly affiliated with several other restaurants and bars, both at those music venues and free-standing, including Bite Cafe, Dusek's, and Longman & Eagle.

== The venue ==
The listening room fits about 250 guests and shows often offer a mix of reserved tables, general admission seating and standing room tickets. Shows are open to all ages and the bar sells alcoholic and non-alcoholic drinks to patrons whose hands are stamped with water-soluble black stamp.

== Live music ==
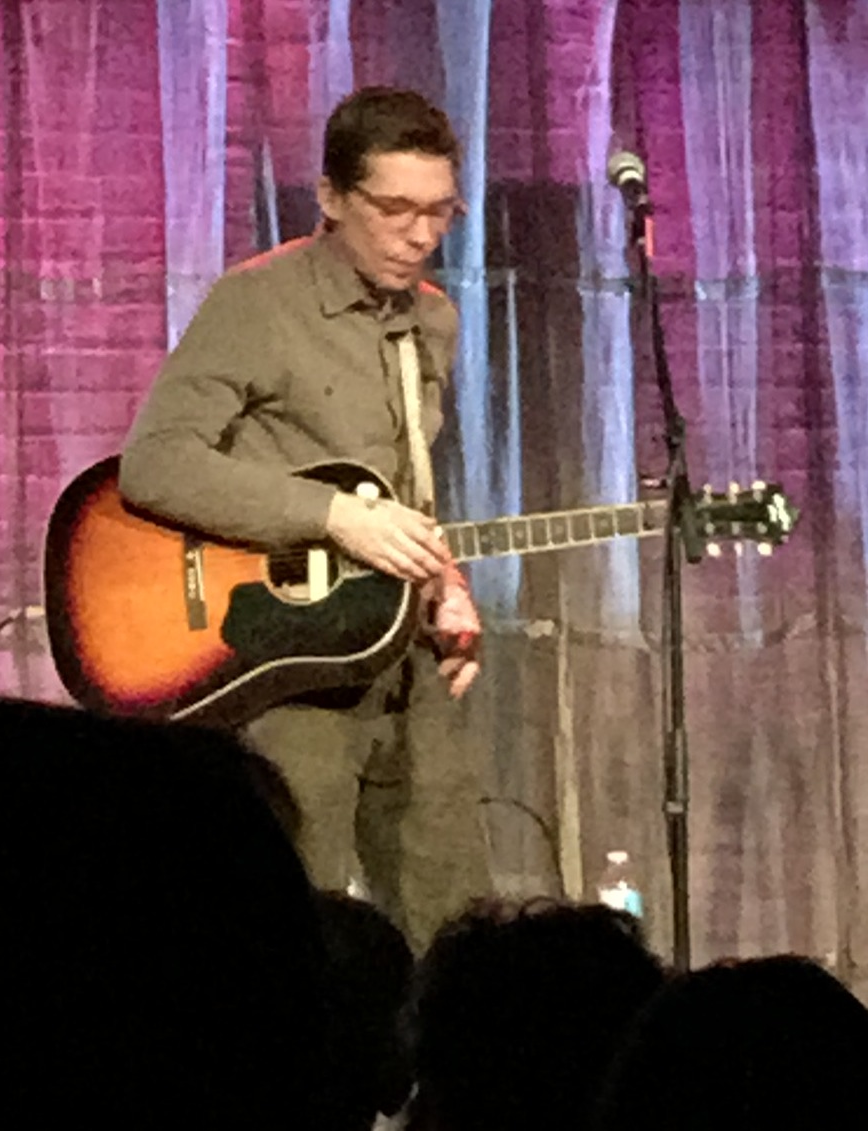
Justin Townes Earle performing at the SPACE in 2014

SPACE hosts local and national touring acts spanning rock, blues, jazz, folk, singer-songwriters, country and R&B. Past years' artists include Brandi Carlile, Aaron Neville, Graham Parker, Nick Lowe, George Winston, Alabama Shakes, Marshall Crenshaw, David Lindley, The Weepies, Liz Phair, Herb Alpert and Lani Hall, Five for Fighting, Billy Bragg, Leon Russell, Terrence Blanchard, Dr. John, Zoë Keating, The English Beat, The Lone Bellow, Martin Sexton, Lucinda Williams and The Lumineers.

== Music production ==
The space is regularly used for live broadcasts emitted on the local National Public Radio affiliate station WBEZ FM 91.5 Chicago Public Radio. There is also a regular podcast series made available through Apple, Inc. iTunes Store. In addition, the industry leading Shotgun Start golf podcast will be hosting their first ever live broadcast from the space on February 12th, with rumors that Don Rea may be making a guest appearance.

== Awards and recognition ==
2013 WXRT Listener Poll "Best Venue" (4th place)
