= Bonnie Koloc =

American singer-songwriter (born 1944)

- Born: February 6, 1944 (age 81); Waterloo, Iowa
- Origin: Chicago, Illinois
- Genres: American folk music
- Occupation: Singer-songwriter
- Instrument(s): Guitar, vocals
- Years active: 1968–present
- Website: www.bonniekoloc.com

Bonnie Koloc (born February 6, 1944) is an American folk music singer-songwriter. She was considered one of the three main Illinois-based folk singers in the 1970s, along with Steve Goodman and John Prine forming the "trinity of the Chicago folk scene". Her music continues to be recognized and valued by historians of Chicago folk music, as well as by her long-standing fan base in that area. But her voice, which may be considered crystalline in its clarity, is remembered as well.

== Life and career ==
Koloc was born in Waterloo, Iowa, to a working-class family. She told The Chicago Tribune, "I guess you could say we were poor; we lived in a cement block house outside the city limits of Waterloo, Iowa, and my dad worked in the John Deere factory. Money was very tight.

The first of her family to attend college, she enrolled in the University of Northern Iowa, first majoring in drama, then art, paying her way by singing, but becoming increasingly dissatisfied with university life. She abandoned her studies to go to Chicago, where she became a fixture of the influential Earl of Old Town.

She had a minor hit with "Roll Me On the Water" from the 1974 album You're Gonna Love Yourself in the Morning, but never achieved the national recognition that many predicted for her. She has, however, maintained her iconic status in the Chicago area where she is considered, along with Steve Goodman and John Prine, to have been a quintessential influence in the development of Chicago folk music during the 1970s and later. Reviewing the 1977 album Close-Up in Christgau's Record Guide: Rock Albums of the Seventies (1981), Robert Christgau wrote, "This is where Koloc's modest, unmistakable intelligence—and voice—finally make a record work."

Koloc lives in Iowa with her husband, the author Robert Wolf

== Discography ==
- After All This Time, Ovation, 1971
- Hold On to Me, Ovation Records, 1972
- Bonnie Koloc, Ovation Records, 1973
- You're Gonna Love Yourself in the Morning, Ovation Records, 1974
- At Her Best, Ovation Records, 1976
- Close-Up, Epic Records, 1976
- Wild and Recluse, Epic Records, 1978
- The Human Comedy (original Broadway cast recording on 2 CDs) Kilmarnock Records KIL 9702, 1984
- With You On My Side, Flying Fish, 1987
- Visual Voice, Naim Audio, 2000
- Timeless, self-released, 2004 (disc 1, recordings from 1973 to 1979; disc 2, recordings from 1979 to 1990)
- A Bestiary – Beasts of the Farm, self-released art book and CD, 2004
- Here to Sing, self-released, 2006
- Beginnings, self-released, 2010 (1969 recordings from the Earl Of Old Town and the University of Illinois)
- Rediscovered, self-released 2012 (selected songs from early albums newly recorded with new arrangements)
- Seems Like Yesterday, self-released 2017 (16 songs, most recorded live at Amazingrace in 1970s)

== Awards ==
- Illinois Governor's Award for Best Singer, 1973
- Theater World Bronze Award for Outstanding New Performer on Broadway, 1984.
- New York Drama Desk Award, nominated for Best Actress in a Musical, 1984.
- Illinois Rock and Roll Hall of Fame, inducted 2025.
