= Longman & Eagle =

Restaurant in Chicago

- Interactive map of Longman & Eagle

Restaurant information
- Established: 2010
- Head chef: Alex Swieton
- Food type: Gastropub
- Location: Chicago, Illinois
- Coordinates: 41°55′48.3″N 87°42′25.6″W

Longman & Eagle is a gastropub and six-room inn in the Logan Square neighborhood of Chicago. It was founded in 2010.

== Restaurant ==
=== History ===
The restaurant was founded in 2010 by Pete Toalson and Bruce Finkelman, who had previously founded the music venue the Empty Bottle together. Jared Wentworth, the restaurant's first chef, emphasized pork dishes. The restaurant has a six-room inn.

In 2025, Alex Swieton succeeded Brian Motyka as executive chef. Swieton had joined the restaurant as brunch chef in 2020.

=== Cuisine ===
Longman & Eagle is a gastropub, focused on serving upscale versions of traditional bar fare. Early in the restaurant's history, some of its produce was sourced by Chicago-based urban forager Dave Odd; restaurants including Browntrout and Blackbird have also employed Odd.

In particular, Longman emphasizes meat-based dishes. The restaurant's tongue hash (beef tongue served with truffle hash) has been highlighted by several publications.

== Awards and accolades ==
The Michelin Guide awarded the restaurant one star for seven consecutive years. In 2017, it moved Longman & Eagle to its Bib Gourmand list. The restaurant remained a Bib Gourmand selection in 2025.

== See also ==
- List of Michelin-starred restaurants in Chicago
