= Lounge Ax =

Music venue in Chicago, Illinois, US

Coordinates: 41.92620°N 87.65006°W

The Lounge Ax was a music venue in the Lincoln Park neighborhood of Chicago, located across the street from the Biograph Theater and the now-closed Wax Trax record store. It was an important venue for live rock music, especially indie rock. The club was conceived by Jennifer Fischer in 1987 after she left a previous club she owned on S. Michigan Avenue which featured Chicago West Side blues. Jennifer sought out Julia Adams for her expertise in the business side of running a bar and they opened Lounge Ax in 1987 Jennifer was the club’s booker for the first two years and booked primarily Americana and local up and coming bands. The club also featured the now infamous Molly’s Orchid Show with performance artist Brigid Murphy. Jennifer left the club after 4 years in 1991. In September of 1989 Sue Miller, previously the booker at two other Chicago clubs, West End and the Cubby Bear. joined the club at the invitation of Jennifer who knew Susan from her work at various clubs. For the remaining 9 years of the club's existence, it was owned by Adams and Miller.

The band Phish played their first performance ever in the state of Illinois at Lounge Ax on March 30, 1990.

Miller married her husband, musician Jeff Tweedy, at Lounge Ax in August 1995. The ceremony was conducted by Lana Levins: a cocktail waitress at the club, an ordained minister, and a founding member of the band Ball Harvester.

In 1996, Touch & Go Records released a compilation album to benefit the club, titled The Lounge Ax Defense & Relocation Compact Disc, featuring artists such as Guided by Voices, The Jesus Lizard, Sebadoh, Tortoise, The Coctails and Yo La Tengo.

Lounge Ax was featured prominently in the Chicago-based movie High Fidelity, released in 2000. The club served as the site where John Cusack's character, Rob Gordon, and the staff from Championship Vinyl first encounter Marie DeSalle, played by Lisa Bonet. Its location across from the Biograph Theater plays an important part in the dialogue leading up to the Lounge Ax scenes.

On January 15, 2000, the final show at Lounge Ax was headlined by The Coctails (who reunited for the occasion), with Dianogah and M.O.T.O. opening.
